= 2024 Geelong Football Club season =

The 2024 Geelong Football Club season was the club's 160th season playing Australian rules football, with the club competing in their 125th season in the Australian Football League (AFL). Geelong continued to field a women's team in the AFL Women's (AFLW) competition, and men's and women's reserves team in the Victorian Football League (VFL) and the VFL Women's (VFLW) respectively.

== Club news ==
Announced in April and May, followed by a gala dinner held in June; the club elevated 2011 premiership captain Cameron Ling to legend status in the Geelong Football Club Hall of Fame; also inducting two-time premiership players Harry Taylor and Travis Varcoe as members. Dual premiership and current coach Chris Scott was also added to the Hall of Fame.

In late May it was confirmed that Geelong Football Club president Craig Drummond will step down from the board at the annual general meeting to be held in December. Drummond had been president since taking over from Colin Carter in 2020, and had been a board member since 2011. Grant McCabe was nominated to replace Drummond as president, with fellow board member and vice president Diane Taylor stepping down from the board in early June after being overlooked to replace Drummond.

Renee Garing and Kate Darby were also made life members of the club at the dinner celebrating the Geelong Football Club Hall of Fame inductees, the first women's players to be afforded the honour. Additionally, Patrick Dangerfield, Tom Stewart, Zach Tuohy, Rhys Stanley, Jed Bews, Brandan Parfitt, Mark O'Connor, Jack Henry, Jake Kolodjashnij, Tom Atikins, and Gryan Miers were afforded life member status.

Former club president Colin Carter was awarded the RJ Hickey Award for his service to Australian football stretching back to 1985.

The club also signed up 90,798 members an increase of over 8,000 from last season's record tally.

Financially, the club posted a net profit of A$6.6m, with the completion of the Joel Selwood Stand assisting with increases to gross revenue.

== AFL team ==
Geelong Football Club
2024 AFL season
- President: Craig Drummond
- Coach: Chris Scott (14th season)
- Captains: Patrick Dangerfield (2nd season)
- Home ground: GMHBA Stadium
- AFL season: 15 wins, 8 losses (3rd)
- Finals series: Preliminary finalists
- Best and Fairest: Max Holmes
- Leading goalkicker: Jeremy Cameron (58)
- Highest home attendance: 87,775 vs. Carlton (Round 7)
- Lowest home attendance: 27,967 vs. Western Bulldogs (Round 20)
- Average home attendance: 38,861
- Club membership: 90,798

=== Season summary ===
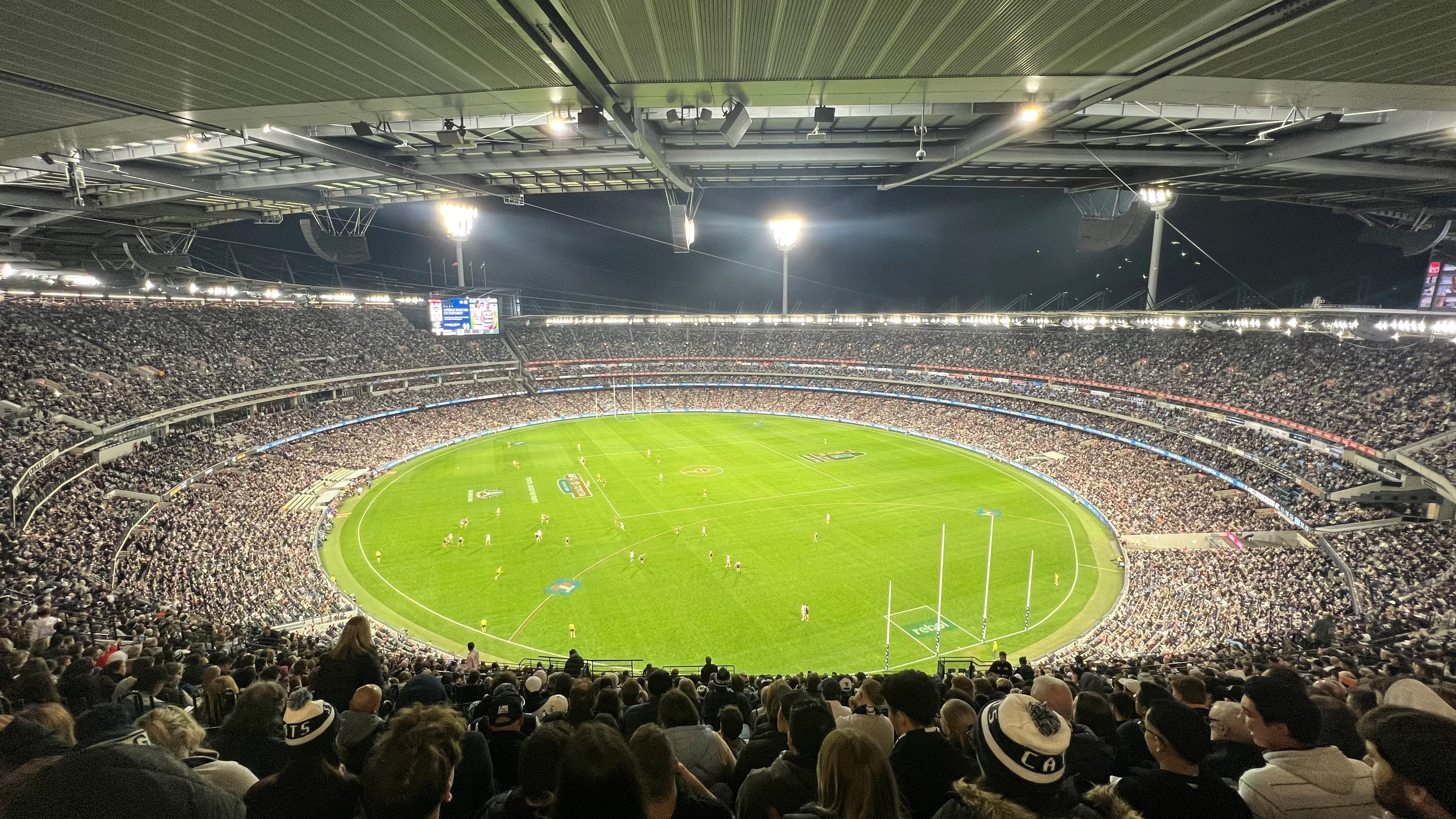
View of the MCG during the club's round 7 match against Carlton which set a new attendance record.

It was the club's 14th AFL season under senior coach Chris Scott, with Patrick Dangerfield continuing as club captain.

With the unveiling of the Joel Selwood Stand and the completion of stadium redevelopments, the crowd of 39,352 for the Geelong's home opener against St Kilda was the largest crowd for a VFL/AFL match at GMHBA Stadium since 1981.

In contrast to 2023, Geelong started the season with three straight wins, celebrating Tom Hawkins' 350th AFL match with a victory over Hawthorn at the MCG on Easter Monday. That match was interrupted by an approximately 40 minute delay before the start of the final quarter due to nearby lightning.

The winning streak extended to seven matches, the club's best start to the season since the 2013 season.

The attendance of 87,775 at the club's round 7 designated home match at the Melbourne Cricket Ground was the highest in club history.

The club's four match losing streak from rounds 8 to 11 was the first time the team had lost four straight matches during the tenure of Chris Scott.

In round 12, club stalwart Tom Hawkins broke former captain Joel Selwood's 355-game record for the most number of matches played for the club.

In the final round of the home and away season, the team climbed to third position on the ladder with a dominant 93-point win over West Coast, headlined by Jeremy Cameron's career high of nine goals for the match.

At the AFL Awards in late August, Oliver Dempsey won the Ron Evans Medal as the AFL Rising Star to become the second Geelong player to win that award after Joel Selwood in 2007. Jeremy Cameron was selected in the 2024 All-Australian team at centre-half forward after kicking 58 goals for the season to finish second in the Coleman Medal standings.

=== Pre-season ===
Geelong started the season with a match simulation game against Carlton at Ikon Park on 22 February, emerging as 17-point winners 10.13 (74) to 8.8 (56) in sweltering conditions. Cameron Guthrie suffered a quad injury in the opening minutes of the match, not returning to the field for the rest of the day.

Geelong played an official practice match as part of the AFL's Community Series against Essendon at GMHBA Stadium on 1 March 2024, scoring five goals in the last quarter to come from behind to win 11.17 (83) to 10.11 (71).

=== Coaching staff ===
Chris Scott continued as the club's men's senior coach for a fourteenth season, having signed a two-year contract extension until the end of the 2024 season.

Assistant coach Shaun Grigg departed the club following the 2023 season, having joined the Gold Coast. Development coach Josh Jenkins also departed the club, as well as fellow development coach Daisy Pearce who was appointed head coach of the West Coast Eagles (AFL Women's). Matthew Egan also left the club after being hired by the Western Bulldogs, with Nigel Lappin replacing him as the head of player development.

Former Geelong player and life member James Rahilly joined the coaching staff as an assistant coach, returning to the club after three seasons with Adelaide, and joining Rahilly in returning to Geelong, former Geelong captain and 2007 premiership ruckman Steven King joined the coaching staff as an assistant coach. King had been the interim head coach at the Gold Coast during the 2023 season.

2024 Geelong coaching staff
Role	Name
Senior coach	Chris Scott
Assistant coach	James Kelly
Assistant coach	Steven King
Assistant coach	James Rahilly
Head of player development	Nigel Lappin
Ruck coach	Brad Ottens
Development coach	Aaron Black
Development coach	Shaun Higgins

=== Playing list ===
==== Changes ====
Deletions from playing list
Player	Reason	Ref.
Esava Ratugolea	Traded to Port Adelaide	
Isaac Smith	Retired	
Jonathon Ceglar	Retired	
Sam Menegola	Delisted	
Sam Simpson	Delisted	
Cooper Whyte	Delisted	
Osca Riccardi	Delisted	
Flynn Kroeger	Delisted	

Additions to playing list
Player	Acquired	Ref.
Connor O'Sullivan	No. 11, 2023 national draft	
Mitchell Edwards	No. 32, 2023 national draft	
Shaun Mannagh	No. 36, 2023 national draft	
George Stevens	No. 58, 2023 national draft	
Oliver Wiltshire	No. 61, 2023 national draft	
Lawson Humphries	No. 63, 2023 national draft	
Emerson Jeka	No. 7, 2023 rookie draft	
Joe Furphy	Category B rookie	

==== Statistics ====
Updated to end of season

Key
^	Denotes player who was on the club's standard rookie list, and therefore eligible for senior selection.
#	Denotes Category B rookie where player needed to be elevated to club's senior list during this season to be eligible for senior selection.

Playing list and statistics
Player	No.	Games	Goals	Behinds	Kicks	Handballs	Disposals	Tackles	Marks	Hitouts	Milestone(s)
Tom Atkins	30	22	0	3	176	201	377	142	34	0	
Jed Bews	24	5	0	0	31	19	50	7	20	0	
Mark Blicavs	46	24	5	7	162	179	341	86	77	230	250th match (round 4)
Jack Bowes	12	22	12	8	254	150	404	104	69	0	
Tanner Bruhn	4	17	5	4	167	130	297	72	39	0	
Jeremy Cameron	5	24	64	41	278	114	392	40	144	1	600th AFL goal (round 7); 250th match (round 22)
Jhye Clark	13	15	2	1	105	78	183	43	26	0	
Ted Clohesy^	40	2	0	1	6	4	10	8	3	0	
Brad Close	45	25	25	12	159	159	318	58	69	0	100th match (qualifying final)
Toby Conway	6	5	1	0	24	44	68	18	12	122	
Patrick Dangerfield	35	16	8	6	195	127	322	63	54	1	
Sam De Koning	16	19	3	0	123	154	277	26	64	103	50th match (round 7)
Oliver Dempsey	28	25	22	13	231	205	436	61	109	0	
Mitch Duncan	22	22	3	7	278	133	411	42	124	0	
Mitchell Edwards	11	—N/a	—N/a	—N/a	—N/a	—N/a	—N/a	—N/a	—N/a	—N/a	
Phoenix Foster	19	—N/a	—N/a	—N/a	—N/a	—N/a	—N/a	—N/a	—N/a	—N/a	
Joe Furphy#	37	—N/a	—N/a	—N/a	—N/a	—N/a	—N/a	—N/a	—N/a	—N/a	
Cameron Guthrie	29	4	0	0	38	29	67	11	13	0	
Zach Guthrie	39	25	4	2	335	121	456	59	150	0	100th match (round 24)
Mitch Hardie^	41	—N/a	—N/a	—N/a	—N/a	—N/a	—N/a	—N/a	—N/a	—N/a	
Tom Hawkins	26	12	15	8	67	42	109	19	35	53	350th match (round 3)
Jack Henry	38	25	0	0	214	73	287	34	143	0	
Oliver Henry	36	23	37	18	132	72	204	31	70	0	50th match (round 3)
Max Holmes	9	25	13	6	374	231	605	74	140	0	
Lawson Humphries	17	11	1	1	137	50	187	19	65	0	AFL debut (round 16)
Emerson Jeka^	43	—N/a	—N/a	—N/a	—N/a	—N/a	—N/a	—N/a	—N/a	—N/a	
Mitch Knevitt	10	4	2	1	18	9	27	10	13	0	
Jake Kolodjashnij	8	24	1	1	203	124	327	47	123	0	
Shaun Mannagh	7	12	15	12	142	53	195	54	24	0	AFL debut (round 1)
Gryan Miers	32	25	21	12	315	190	505	106	101	0	
Oisín Mullin^	34	12	0	1	58	58	116	32	23	0	
Oscar Murdoch^	31	—N/a	—N/a	—N/a	—N/a	—N/a	—N/a	—N/a	—N/a	—N/a	
Shannon Neale	33	15	23	11	88	48	136	31	61	54	
Mark O'Connor	42	13	2	3	87	68	155	40	50	0	
Connor O'Sullivan	14	1	0	1	3	8	11	1	3	0	AFL debut (round 5)
Brandan Parfitt	3	9	1	2	77	76	153	57	13	0	
Gary Rohan	23	12	9	1	65	23	88	14	34	3	200th match (round 17)
Rhys Stanley	1	14	4	2	83	53	136	33	34	374	200th match (round 5)
Tyson Stengle	18	25	46	18	222	113	335	58	68	0	100th AFL goal (round 4)
George Stevens	15	—N/a	—N/a	—N/a	—N/a	—N/a	—N/a	—N/a	—N/a	—N/a	
Tom Stewart	44	23	1	3	358	137	495	68	140	0	150th match (round 2)
Zach Tuohy	2	17	8	4	188	88	276	23	53	0	100th AFL goal (round 15)
James Willis	20	—N/a	—N/a	—N/a	—N/a	—N/a	—N/a	—N/a	—N/a	—N/a	
Oliver Wiltshire	21	—N/a	—N/a	—N/a	—N/a	—N/a	—N/a	—N/a	—N/a	—N/a	

=== Results ===
Key
H	Home game
A	Away game
N	Neutral venue game
QF	Qualifying final
PF	Preliminary final

Table of 2024 AFL season results
Round	Date	Result	Score			Opponent	Score			Ground		Attendance	Ladder
Round	Date	Result	G	B	T	Opponent	G	B	T	Ground		Attendance	Ladder
OR	Bye												—N/a
1	16 March	Won	10	16	76	St Kilda	9	14	68	GMHBA Stadium	H	39,352	9th
2	22 March	Won	14	12	96	Adelaide	11	11	77	Adelaide Oval	A	44,758	6th ▲
3	1 April	Won	17	4	106	Hawthorn	10	10	70	Melbourne Cricket Ground	A	67,020	4th ▲
4	6 April	Won	14	11	95	Western Bulldogs	14	7	91	Adelaide Oval	N	45,970	5th ▼
5	14 April	Won	21	13	139	North Melbourne	10	4	64	GMHBA Stadium	H	31,194	2nd ▲
6	20 April	Won	9	9	63	Brisbane Lions	4	13	37	The Gabba	A	30,429	1st ▲
7	27 April	Won	18	10	118	Carlton	15	15	105	Melbourne Cricket Ground	H	87,775	1st
8	4 May	Lost	9	12	66	Melbourne	10	14	74	Melbourne Cricket Ground	A	51,795	2nd ▼
9	10 May	Lost	14	11	95	Port Adelaide	15	11	101	GMHBA Stadium	H	29,942	2nd
10	16 May	Lost	15	10	100	Gold Coast	26	8	164	TIO Stadium	A	12,112	3rd ▼
11	25 May	Lost	11	8	74	Greater Western Sydney	11	12	78	GMHBA Stadium	H	30,821	6th ▼
12	1 June	Won	15	9	99	Richmond	10	9	69	GMHBA Stadium	H	31,054	3rd ▲
13	9 June	Lost	12	10	82	Sydney	16	16	112	Sydney Cricket Ground	A	44,714	5th ▼
14	Bye												6th ▼
15	21 June	Lost	11	9	75	Carlton	21	12	138	Melbourne Cricket Ground	A	75,218	7th ▼
16	29 June	Won	16	9	105	Essendon	9	6	60	Melbourne Cricket Ground	H	54,698	5th ▲
17	6 July	Won	16	14	110	Hawthorn	9	5	59	GMHBA Stadium	H	33,188	5th
18	12 July	Won	13	13	91	Collingwood	10	11	71	Melbourne Cricket Ground	A	73,435	3rd ▲
19	20 July	Lost	7	6	48	Western Bulldogs	13	17	95	GMHBA Stadium	H	27,967	6th ▼
20	27 July	Won	16	10	106	North Melbourne	10	6	66	Blundstone Arena	A	10,045	6th
21	3 August	Won	13	12	90	Adelaide	13	7	85	GMHBA Stadium	H	28,939	5th ▲
22	10 August	Won	10	13	73	Fremantle	9	8	62	Optus Stadium	A	50,600	4th ▲
23	17 August	Lost	14	5	89	St Kilda	16	11	107	Marvel Stadium	A	31,945	4th
24	24 August	Won	26	12	168	West Coast	11	9	75	GMHBA Stadium	H	32,545	3rd ▲
QF	5 September	Won	20	18	138	Port Adelaide	7	12	54	Adelaide Oval	A	50,342	—
PF	21 September	Lost	12	13	85	Brisbane Lions	14	11	95	Melbourne Cricket Ground	N	93,066	—

=== Ladder ===
Pos	Team	Pld	W	L	D	PF	PA	PP	Pts	Qualification
1	Sydney	23	17	6	0	2242	1769	126.7	68	Finals series
2	Port Adelaide	23	16	7	0	2011	1752	114.8	64	Finals series
3	Geelong	23	15	8	0	2164	1928	112.2	60	Finals series
4	Greater Western Sydney	23	15	8	0	2034	1864	109.1	60	Finals series
5	Brisbane Lions (P)	23	14	8	1	2130	1747	121.9	58	Finals series
6	Western Bulldogs	23	14	9	0	2171	1736	125.1	56	Finals series
7	Hawthorn	23	14	9	0	2090	1763	118.5	56	Finals series
8	Carlton	23	13	10	0	2151	1952	110.2	52	Finals series
9	Collingwood	23	12	9	2	1991	1943	102.5	52	
10	Fremantle	23	12	10	1	1964	1755	111.9	50	
11	Essendon	23	11	11	1	1892	2024	93.5	46	
12	St Kilda	23	11	12	0	1748	1758	99.4	44	
13	Gold Coast	23	11	12	0	1925	1943	99.1	44	
14	Melbourne	23	11	12	0	1785	1812	98.5	44	
15	Adelaide	23	8	14	1	1906	1923	99.1	34	
16	West Coast	23	5	18	0	1594	2339	68.1	20	
17	North Melbourne	23	3	20	0	1619	2550	63.5	12	
18	Richmond	23	2	21	0	1505	2364	63.7	8	

Source: afl.com.au
Rules for classification: 1) points; 2) percentage; 3) number of points for
(P) Premiers

=== Awards ===
==== League awards ====
- Tom Wills Award:
  - Oliver Dempsey (Round 16 vs Essendon)
- All-Australian:
  - Jeremy Cameron (Forward) (Note: Max Holmes and Tyson Stengle were also selected in the initial squad.)
- Rising Star:
  - Winner: Oliver Dempsey (52 votes – nominated in Round 1)
  - Lawson Humphries (Nominated in Round 18)
- AFLPA 22 Under 22 team:
  - Oliver Dempsey (Forward)
  - Max Holmes (Defence)

==== Club Awards ====
- Carji Greeves Medal: Max Holmes (164 votes)
- Best Young Player Award: Oliver Dempsey
- Tom Harley Best Clubman: Tom Atkins & Tom Hawkins
- Carter Family Community Champion Award: Tom Hawkins

== VFL team ==
Geelong Football Club
2024 VFL season
- President: Craig Drummond
- Coach: Mark Corrigan (2nd season)
- Captains: Dan Capiron (1st season)
- Home ground: GMHBA Stadium
- VFL season: 12 wins, 1 draw, 5 losses (4th)
- Finals series: Semi finalists
- Best and Fairest: Mitch Hardie
- Leading goalkicker: Shaun Mannagh (23)

=== Season summary ===
Team stalwart Dan Capiron was appointed captain, with Brayden Ham as vice-captain. Ham would step away from VFL-level football in the first month of the season.

The club finished in fourth position on the ladder after the home-and-away season, with 12 wins and a draw from their 18 matches. The team would use 55 players across the season, with captain Capiron the only player to appear in every match.

In the first week of the finals, Geelong were defeated by minor premiers Werribee by 21 points in blustery conditions at Avalon Airport Oval. The following week the team was eliminated from the finals after losing by 29 points against the Southport Sharks. Club senior record games holder Tom Hawkins made his first appearance for the VFL team since the 2011 season, returning from injury to kick a goal in what was his final appearance at GMHBA Stadium.

Mitch Hardie was named to the VFL Team of the Year, earning a position on the half-forward flank. Hardie kicked 14 goals for the season and averaged 29 disposals per match. Ted Clohesy had been named to the initial squad in consideration for the VFL Team of the Year, but missed out on final selection. Hardie also finished fourth in voting for the VFL's J.J. Liston Trophy with 19 votes, while winning the club's VFL best and fairest award.

=== Results ===
Key
H	Home game
A	Away game
QF	Qualifying final
SF	Semi-final

Table of season results
Round	Date	Result	Score			Opponent	Score			Ground	
Round	Date	Result	G	B	T	Opponent	G	B	T	Ground	
1	23 March	Lost	7	8	50	Werribee	16	7	103	GMHBA Stadium	H
2	30 March	Lost	11	11	77	Box Hill	16	15	111	GMHBA Stadium	H
3	14 April	Won	12	17	89	Northern Bullants	5	6	36	Genis Steel Oval	A
4	20 April	Won	9	13	67	Brisbane	9	10	64	Brighton Homes Arena	A
5	27 April	Won	23	18	156	Carlton	8	7	55	Ikon Park	A
6	5 May	Won	18	5	113	Frankston	6	13	49	GMHBA Stadium	H
7	Bye										
8	18 May	Won	13	10	88	Coburg	10	6	66	Piranha Park	A
9	25 May	Won	16	14	100	Greater Western Sydney	7	7	49	GMHBA Stadium	H
10	1 June	Won	11	11	77	Richmond	8	12	60	GMHBA Stadium	H
11	9 June	Won	12	11	83	Sydney	10	14	74	Sydney Cricket Ground	A
12	Bye										
13	23 June	Lost	12	14	86	Port Melbourne	13	10	88	ETU Stadium	A
14	30 June	Won	13	10	88	Sandringham	11	7	73	GMHBA Stadium	H
15	7 July	Lost	10	11	71	Box Hill	10	12	72	Fenjiu Stadium	A
16	13 July	Won	15	13	103	Collingwood	11	8	74	Olympic Park Oval	A
17	20 July	Draw	8	9	57	Footscray	8	9	57	GMHBA Stadium	H
18	27 July	Won	10	12	72	North Melbourne	7	9	51	Arden Street Oval	A
19	Bye										
20	10 August	Lost	11	12	78	Carlton	16	5	101	GMHBA Stadium	H
21	18 August	Won	10	12	72	Sandringham	8	11	59	Trevor Barker Beach Oval	A
QF	31 August	Lost	5	6	36	Werribee	8	9	57	Avalon Airport Oval	A
SF	7 September	Lost	7	16	58	Southport	13	9	87	GMHBA Stadium	H

=== Ladder ===
Pos	Team	Pld	W	L	D	PF	PA	PP	Pts	Qualification
2	Footscray (R)	18	14	3	1	1654	1312	126.1	58	Finals series
3	Brisbane (R)	18	13	5	0	1754	1467	119.6	52	Finals series
4	Geelong (R)	18	12	5	1	1537	1242	123.8	50	Finals series
5	Southport	18	12	6	0	1515	1257	120.5	48	Finals series
6	Box Hill (R)	18	12	6	0	1465	1278	114.6	48	Finals series

Source: afl.com.au
Rules for classification: 1) points; 2) percentage; 3) number of points for
(R) Reserves

=== Awards ===
- VFL Team of the Year: Mitch Hardie (forward)

==== Club Awards ====
- Best and Fairest: Mitch Hardie (223 votes)
- Little Vic Award (Best first year player): Patrick Hughes

== AFL Women's team ==
Geelong Football Club
2024 AFL Women's season
- President: Craig Drummond
- Coach: Daniel Lowther (4th season)
- Captains: Meg McDonald (5th season)
- Home ground: GMHBA Stadium
- AFLW season: 4 wins, 6 losses, 1 draw (10th)
- Best and Fairest: Nina Morrison
- Leading goalkicker: Aishling Moloney (21)
- Highest home attendance: 3,838 vs Melbourne (Week 1)
- Lowest home attendance: 2,033 vs Fremantle (Week 6)
- Average home attendance: 2,745
- Club membership: 7,943

=== Season summary ===
Meg McDonald continued as captain, with Nina Morrison and Becky Webster as vice-captains. Three-time best and fairest winner Amy McDonald joined the leadership group for the first time, alongside Chantel Emonson and Mikayla Bowen.

After making the preliminary finals in 2023, Geelong were again expected to make the finals in 2024. However the team got off to a slow start, only winning one of their opening six matches, although they did earn two premiership points from a draw against 2023 grand finalists North Melbourne. Forward Chloe Scheer missed the entire season due to injury, while replacement player Lilly Pearce who was expected to fill the void from the retired Erin Hoare also didn't play a match due to injury.

Irish key forward Aishling Moloney had a standout season, kicking 21 goals to share the AFL Women's leading goalkicker award with Brisbane's Taylor Smith. Moloney and Morrison would also gain selection in the initial squad for the 2024 AFL Women's All-Australian team, with Moloney selected in the final squad at centre-half forward. Moloney would also receive nine votes in the 2024 AFL Women's best and fairest award count.

The team's best win came in week 8 when they defeated the reigning premiers Brisbane at GMHBA Stadium by 10 points. Disappointingly Geelong was held goalless for the first time in their loss to Carlton in week 3.

Nina Morrison won the club's best and fairest award with 138 votes, ahead of Aishling Moloney (98 votes) and 2023 winner Georgie Prespakis (74 votes). Playing a midfield role, Morrison averaged 20.8 disposals, 7.1 tackles and 3.9 clearances per match, also kicking five goals for the season.

Following the end of the season, Irish defender Anna-Rose Kennedy made the decision to return to Ireland for personal reasons.

=== Preseason ===
Before the start of the season in late August, the club participated in two preseason fixtures. The first a match simulation against Collingwood at Olympic Park Oval was played on 10 August, which Geelong won 4.5 (29) to 3.6 (24); that was followed on 17 August by an official practice match against Essendon at Windy Hill, where the club was defeated 3.5 (23) to 4.9 (33).

=== Coaching staff ===
Daniel Lowther continued as head coach of the AFLW program for a fourth season. Continuing as assistant coaches were Andrew Bruce (forwards), Josh Finch (midfield), and Geelong VFL Women's coach Elise Coventry (defence). Current men's team player Gary Rohan, former Geelong VFL player Will Sexton, continued as development coaches and were joined by Andrew Allthorpe.

2024 Geelong coaching staff
Role	Name
Senior coach	Daniel Lowther
Assistant coach (forwards)	Andrew Bruce
Assistant coach (midfield)	Josh Finch
Assistant coach (defence)	Elise Coventry
Development coach	Will Sexton
Development coach	Gary Rohan
Development coach	Andrew Allthorpe
Talls coach	Paul Chambers
Bench coach	David Morgan

=== Playing list ===
==== Changes ====
Deletions from playing list
Player	Reason	Ref.
Renee Garing	Retired	
Annabel Johnson	Traded to West Coast	
Sammy Gooden	Delisted	
Ingrid Houtsma	Delisted	
Mia Skinner	Delisted	
Erin Hoare	Retired	

Additions to playing list
Player	Acquired	Ref.
Bella Smith	Trade from Brisbane	
Chantal Mason	No. 18, 2023 national draft	
Bryde O'Rourke	No. 23, 2023 national draft	
Kate Kenny	International rookie selection from Offaly GAA	
Lilly Pearce	Replacement player signing from Collingwood (VFLW) (Note: Replacement player for Olivia Fuller who was placed on the club's inactive list.)	
Caitlin Thorne	Replacement player signing from Box Hill (VFLW) (Note: Replacement player for Erin Hoare following her retirement.)	

==== Statistics ====
Updated as at the end of the season

Key
#	Denotes player who was on the club's rookie list.
^	Denotes player who was on the club's inactive list.

Playing list and statistics
Player	No.	Games	Goals	Behinds	Kicks	Handballs	Disposals	Marks	Tackles	Hitouts	Milestone(s)
Mikayla Bowen	1	11	5	8	86	91	177	27	68	0	50th AFLW match (week 1)
Bella Smith	2	5	0	0	12	26	38	0	16	0	Club debut (week 6)
Amy McDonald	3	7	0	2	69	67	136	7	35	0	50th AFLW match (week 1)
Darcy Moloney	4	8	2	2	41	67	108	10	23	0	—N/a
Jacqueline Parry	5	11	12	6	72	38	110	38	35	11	50th AFL match (week 4)
Julia Crockett-Grills	6	10	2	1	103	36	136	32	31	0	—N/a
Kate Surman	7	9	3	3	45	36	81	15	37	0	50th AFLW match (week 1)
Kate Darby	8	11	1	0	62	21	83	17	45	143	50th AFLW match (week 6)
Nina Morrison	9	11	5	3	127	102	229	27	78	0	50th AFLW match (week 11)
Georgie Rankin	10	8	1	0	15	33	48	6	25	0	50th AFLW match (week 6)
Meg McDonald	11	11	0	0	29	47	76	14	8	0	—N/a
Kate Kenny#	12	7	2	2	24	24	48	6	8	0	AFLW debut (week 1)
Olivia Fuller^	13	—N/a	—N/a	—N/a	—N/a	—N/a	—N/a	—N/a	—N/a	—N/a	—N/a
Chloe Scheer	14	—N/a	—N/a	—N/a	—N/a	—N/a	—N/a	—N/a	—N/a	—N/a	—N/a
Shelley Scott	15	10	9	4	47	23	70	22	15	1	75th AFLW match (week 8)
Chantel Emonson	16	11	0	1	114	31	145	21	33	0	—N/a
Anna-Rose Kennedy#	18	11	0	0	75	19	94	18	10	0	—N/a
Brooke Plummer	19	3	0	0	7	3	10	5	1	0	—N/a
Zali Friswell	20	11	2	0	51	83	134	27	41	0	—N/a
Rebecca Webster	21	11	0	1	135	85	220	26	38	0	—N/a
Rachel Kearns	22	9	1	0	70	24	94	14	11	0	—N/a
Bryde O'Rourke	23	1	0	0	1	1	2	0	1	0	AFLW debut (week 6)
Chantal Mason	24	1	0	0	0	0	0	0	1	0	AFLW debut (week 8)
Caitlin Thorne	25	5	0	1	23	15	38	8	11	0	AFLW debut (week 4)
Claudia Gunjaca	26	11	0	0	59	26	85	22	33	0	—N/a
Lilly Pearce	29	—N/a	—N/a	—N/a	—N/a	—N/a	—N/a	—N/a	—N/a	—N/a	—N/a
Gabbie Featherston	32	8	0	2	28	28	56	10	16	33	—N/a
Abbey McDonald	39	4	0	0	8	11	19	7	7	0	—N/a
Georgie Prespakis	41	9	2	5	91	91	182	6	51	0	—N/a
Melissa Bragg	44	6	0	0	12	11	23	4	16	28	—N/a
Aishling Moloney#	45	11	21	11	104	52	156	32	31	5	—N/a

=== Results ===
Key
H	Home game
A	Away game

Table of season results
Round	Date	Result	Score			Opponent	Score			Ground		Attendance	Ladder
Round	Date	Result	G	B	T	Opponent	G	B	T	Ground		Attendance	Ladder
1	31 August	Lost	6	4	40	Melbourne	6	6	42	GMHBA Stadium	H	3,838	11th
2	8 September	Draw	5	6	36	North Melbourne	5	6	36	Arden Street Oval	A	3,019	15th ▼
3	14 September	Lost	0	5	5	Carlton	4	5	29	Ikon Park	A	2,417	15th
4	21 September	Won	15	6	96	Gold Coast	4	3	27	People First Stadium	A	1,612	12th ▲
5	26 September	Lost	9	7	61	Hawthorn	12	7	79	GMHBA Stadium	H	2,771	15th ▼
6	1 October	Lost	3	9	27	Fremantle	6	9	45	GMHBA Stadium	H	2,033	16th ▼
6	6 October	Won	5	14	44	Sydney	6	5	41	Henson Park	A	3,127	11th ▲
7	12 October	Lost	5	9	39	Richmond	6	10	46	Swinburne Centre	A	2,455	13th ▼
8	20 October	Won	7	5	47	Brisbane	5	7	37	GMHBA Stadium	H	2,850	12th ▲
9	26 October	Won	9	2	56	West Coast	3	5	23	Mineral Resources Park	A	2,015	10th ▲
10	1 November	Lost	4	4	28	Adelaide	4	8	32	GMHBA Stadium	H	2,233	10th

=== Ladder ===
Pos	Team	Pld	W	L	D	PF	PA	PP	Pts	Qualification
1	North Melbourne (P)	11	10	0	1	656	208	315.4	42	Finals series
2	Hawthorn	11	10	1	0	597	309	193.2	40	Finals series
3	Brisbane	11	9	2	0	611	335	182.4	36	Finals series
4	Adelaide	11	8	3	0	494	285	173.3	32	Finals series
5	Fremantle	11	8	3	0	404	297	136.0	32	Finals series
6	Port Adelaide	11	7	4	0	431	364	118.4	28	Finals series
7	Richmond	11	6	4	1	442	337	131.2	26	Finals series
8	Essendon	11	6	4	1	376	359	104.7	26	Finals series
9	Melbourne	11	6	5	0	369	420	87.9	24	
10	Geelong	11	4	6	1	479	437	109.6	18	
11	St Kilda	11	4	7	0	379	396	95.7	16	
12	Western Bulldogs	11	4	7	0	291	461	63.1	16	
13	West Coast	11	4	7	0	320	509	62.9	16	
14	Carlton	11	4	7	0	266	532	50.0	16	
15	Sydney	11	3	8	0	395	538	73.4	12	
16	Greater Western Sydney	11	1	9	1	374	531	70.4	6	
17	Gold Coast	11	1	9	1	311	569	54.7	6	
18	Collingwood	11	1	10	0	245	553	44.3	4	

Source: afl.com.au
Rules for classification: 1) points; 2) percentage; 3) number of points for
(P) Premiers

=== Awards ===
==== League awards ====
- AFL Women's Leading Goalkicker: Aishling Moloney
- 2024 AFL Women's All-Australian team: Aishling Moloney (forward)
- AFLPA 22 Under 22 team: Georgie Prespakis (midfield) (captain)

==== Club Awards ====
- Best and fairest: Nina Morrison
- The 'Hoops' Award: Mikayla Bowen
- Community Champion: Kate Darby

== VFLW team ==
Geelong Football Club
2024 VFL Women's season
- President: Craig Drummond
- Coach: Elise Coventry (2nd season)
- Captains: Abbey Favell; Liv Stewart; Poppy Schaap (1st season)
- Home grounds: GMHBA Stadium; Deakin University Elite Sports Precinct
- VFLW season: 3 wins, 11 losses (14th)
- Best and Fairest: Lily Jordan
- Leading goalkicker: Chantal Mason (7)

=== Season summary ===
Before the start of the 2024 VFL Women's season, Geelong nominated Abby Favell, Liv Stewart and Poppy Schaap as a three-person leadership group with no formal captain or vice-captain roles.

Geelong were held goalless for the third (round 2), fourth (round 8), and fifth (round 12) times in the club's history in the VFLW, registering their lowest score of 0.1 (1) against Collingwood at Deakin University Elite Sports Precinct.

It was a disappointing campaign for the club, with the team finishing last on the ladder with just three wins for the season. 49 players would play at least one match for the team, including 31 debutants.

Midfielder Lily Jordan won the best and fairest award with 57 votes, ahead of Breanna Pratt and Poppy Schaap. Molly Walton was awarded the Hoops Award which was presented in the VFLW program for the first time, while Mia Fuller won the player-voted Cats Value Award.

=== Results ===
Key
H	Home game
A	Away game

Table of season results
Round	Date	Result	Score			Opponent	Score			Ground	
Round	Date	Result	G	B	T	Opponent	G	B	T	Ground	
1	23 March	Lost	4	4	28	Carlton	9	5	59	GMHBA Stadium	H
2	30 March	Lost	0	2	2	Box Hill	14	14	98	GMHBA Stadium	H
3	6 April	Won	8	6	54	Southern Saints	5	6	36	Trevor Barker Beach Oval	A
4	13 April	Won	5	3	33	Darebin	4	2	26	Central Reserve, Colac	H
5	20 April	Lost	1	3	9	Greater Western Sydney	14	10	94	Tom Wills Oval, Sydney	A
6	27 April	Won	8	11	59	North Melbourne	5	5	35	Arden Street Oval	A
7	4 May	Lost	4	6	30	Carlton	5	3	33	Ikon Park	A
8	11 May	Lost	0	1	1	Collingwood	6	7	43	Deakin University Elite Sports Precinct	H
9	18 May	Lost	5	6	36	Casey	7	7	49	Casey Fields	A
10	26 May	Lost	0	3	3	Williamstown	13	11	89	DSV Stadium	A
11	1 June	Lost	1	2	8	Western Bulldogs	12	7	79	Avalon Airport Oval	H
12	9 June	Lost	0	2	2	Box Hill	14	8	92	Box Hill City Oval	A
13	15 June	Lost	1	1	7	Port Melbourne	7	12	54	Deakin University Elite Sports Precinct	H
14	22 June	Lost	2	3	15	Essendon	10	4	64	Windy Hill	A

=== Ladder ===
Pos	Team	Pld	W	L	D	PF	PA	PP	Pts
10	Carlton	14	5	9	0	447	502	89.0	20
11	Darebin	14	5	9	0	341	487	70.0	20
12	Sydney Swans (E)	5	4	1	0	418	121	345.5	16
13	Southern Saints	14	4	10	0	319	503	63.4	16
14	Geelong Cats	14	3	11	0	287	851	33.7	12

Source: AFL.com.au
Rules for classification: 1) points; 2) percentage; 3) number of points for.
(E) Club playing a limited number of exhibition matches, ineligible for progression to finals series

=== Awards ===
==== Club Awards ====
- Best and Fairest: Lily Jordan
- The Hoops Award: Molly Walton
- Cats Values Award: Mia Fuller
