= 2025 Geelong Football Club season =

The 2025 Geelong Football Club season was the club's 161st season playing Australian rules football, with the club competing in their 126th season in the Australian Football League (AFL). Geelong continued to field a women's team in the AFL Women's (AFLW) competition, and men's and women's reserves teams in the Victorian Football League (VFL) and the VFL Women's (VFLW) respectively.

After finishing second on the ladder, the AFL team progressed through to the club's 20th Grand Final, losing to the Brisbane Lions by 47 points in the 2025 AFL Grand Final.

== Club news ==
Grant McCabe was officially appointed as president of the club at the annual general meeting held in December 2024. Lyndsay Sharpe was elected as vice president.

Tyson Stengle and Lawson Humphries were selected in the Indigenous All-Stars squad for the preseason exhibition match against Fremantle. Stengle kicked a goal, while Humphries was named among the All-Stars best players in their 43-point win.

In March it was reported that Geelong and other clubs were being audited regarding third-party player payments. The audit coming after the club was investigated over the arrangement Chris Scott had with sponsor Morris Finance.

In early September, the club welcomed current Australia national cricket team coach Andrew McDonald to the board of directors. McDonald had been associated with the club since 2016.

The club increased their membership numbers, setting a new record of 92,379 members an increase of 1,581 from 2024.

Following the end of the AFL's audit, the club was fined A$77,500 (with A$40,000 suspended) for a "series of 'non-disclosures or late disclosures' of arrangements with club associates and third parties. Non-disclosures found in Geelong's AFLW program were found to be administrative errors, rather than 'material breaches.' The audit found Geelong did not breach the AFL salary cap or player movement rules.

== AFL team ==
Geelong Football Club
2025 AFL season
- President: Grant McCabe
- Coach: Chris Scott (15th season)
- Captains: Patrick Dangerfield (3rd season)
- Home ground: GMHBA Stadium
- AFL season: 17 wins, 6 losses (2nd)
- Finals series: Runners-up
- Best and Fairest: Max Holmes
- Leading goalkicker: Jeremy Cameron (83)
- Highest home attendance: 88,746 vs. Hawthorn (Round 6)
- Lowest home attendance: 25,372 vs. Fremantle (Round 1)
- Average home attendance: 35,439
- Club membership: 92,379

=== Season summary ===
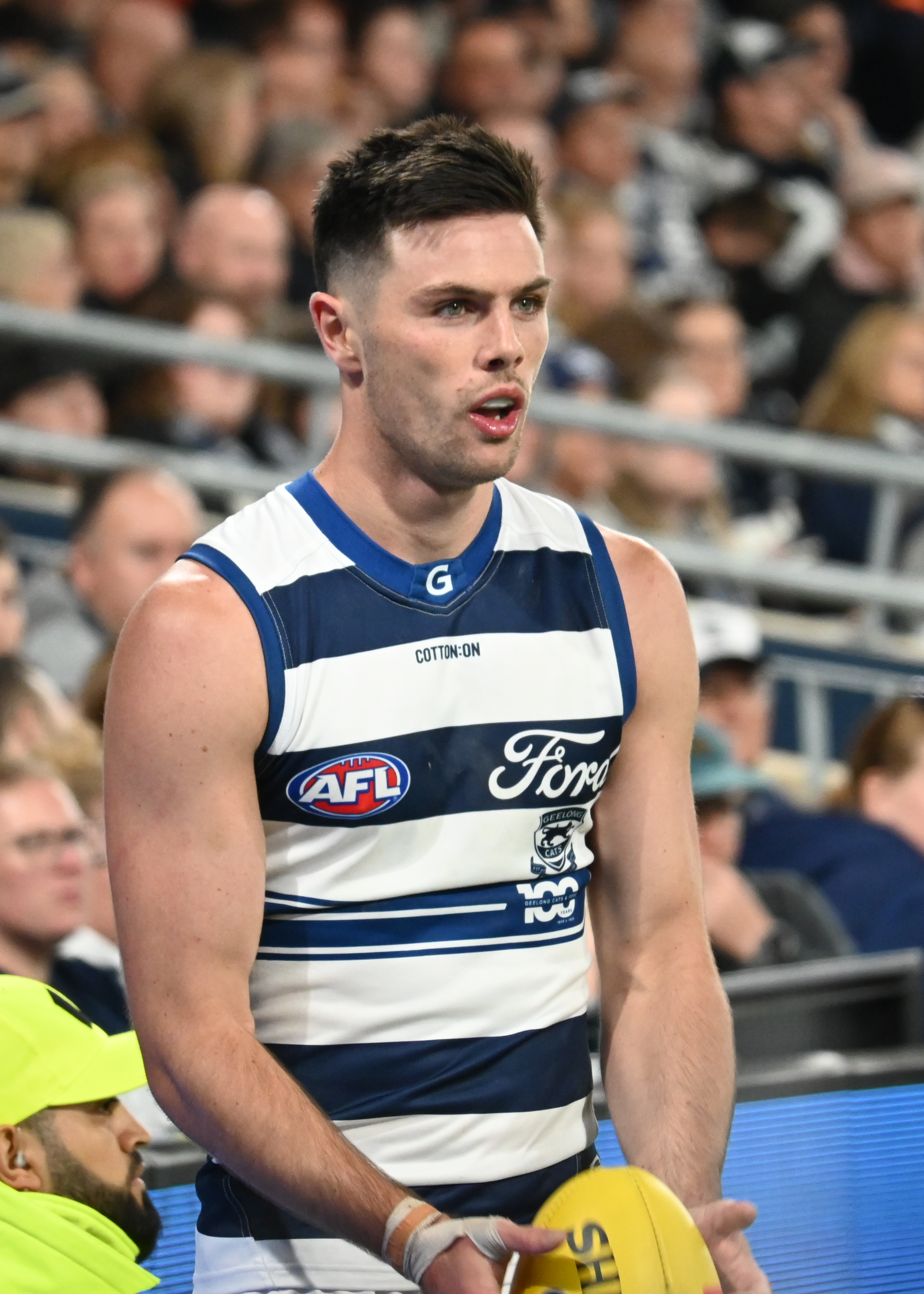
The club celebrated the 100th year of the sponsorship partnership with Ford Australia by wearing a one-off guernsey featuring the Ford blue and a modified club logo. The guernsey (seen here on Ollie Henry) was worn against Melbourne in round 4.

It was the club's 15th AFL season under senior coach Chris Scott, with Patrick Dangerfield continuing as club captain.

The club was due to play in the season opening match at The Gabba against reigning premiers Brisbane Lions, but the match was postponed on 4 March due to the impact of Severe Tropical Cyclone Alfred on the South East Queensland region. On 7 March, the AFL announced that the match would be played during round 3 of the season.

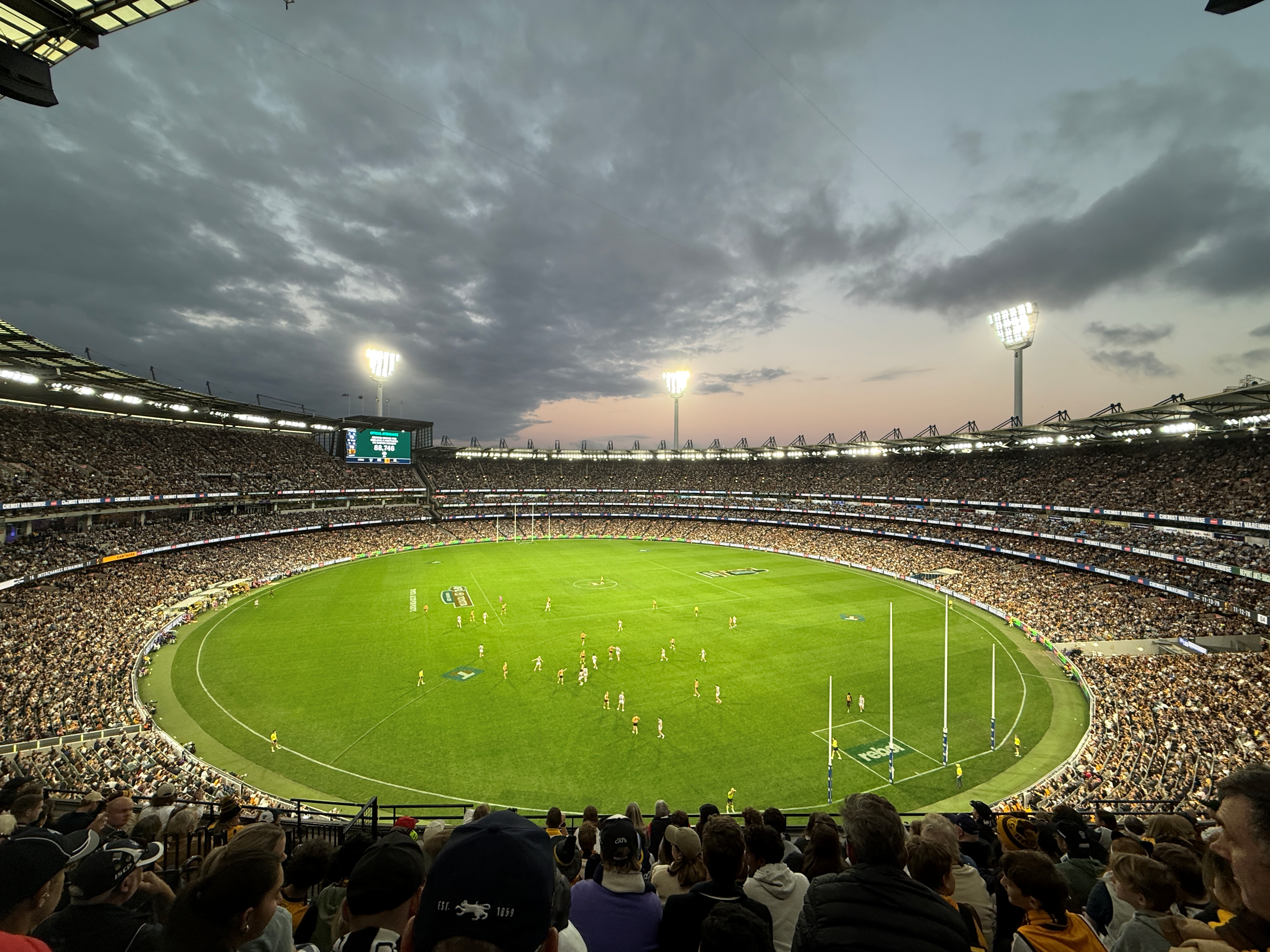
View of the MCG during the round 6 match against Hawthorn. The attendance of 88,746 set a new record as the highest attended home-and-away season match involving the club.

In the round 6 match against Hawthorn at the Melbourne Cricket Ground, the club's record for largest attendance at a home and away match was broken. 88,746 attended the match won by seven points by Geelong, eclipsing the previous mark set in 2010 against Collingwood.

In round 20 against North Melbourne, forward Jeremy Cameron kicked a career high 11 goals to become the first Geelong player since Gary Ablett Sr. in 1994 to score more than 10 goals in a match.

Geelong finished the home and away season with six straight victories to qualify for the 2025 AFL finals series in second position on the ladder behind minor premiers Adelaide. Following two dominate finals performances against the Brisbane Lions and Hawthorn, the team qualified for the 2025 AFL Grand Final, the 20th time the club would play in the premiership deciding match. The attendance of 99,567 for the 30-point preliminary final victory against Hawthorn was the highest non-Grand Final attended Geelong match since 1969. It was also the biggest non-Grand Final attendance at the MCG since 1971.

Club vice-captain Tom Stewart was forced to miss the Grand Final after suffering a concussion as a result of a heavy tackle by Mabior Chol during the first quarter of the preliminary final.

Midfielder Bailey Smith finished third in the Brownlow Medal count, polling a career-best 29 votes behind winner Matt Rowell. Smith earned votes in 13 matches including six best-on-ground performances. Geelong finished the night with the most votes among the clubs, with 13 players receiving 99 total votes. Young defender Connor O'Sullivan finished fifth in the 2025 AFL Rising Star Award following his strong season after appearing in 24 matches.

=== Pre-season ===
Geelong started the season with a match simulation game against Hawthorn at GMHBA Stadium on 17 February, winning 15.16 (106) to 13.8 (86), with Ollie Henry kicking four goals.

Geelong played an official practice match as part of the AFL's Community Series against Essendon at GMHBA Stadium on 25 February. After a tight first three quarters, Essendon kicked clear in the final quarter to win 17.2 (104) to Geelong 12.11 (83) in front of a crowd of 11,626.

=== Coaching staff ===
Chris Scott continued as the club's men's senior coach for a 15th season, having signed a contract extension until the end of the 2026 season. Scott coached his 350th match against Richmond in round 18.

Assistant coach Steven King was appointed as the 28th coach of the Melbourne Football Club in September, but continued with his role at Geelong until the end of the season.

2025 Geelong coaching staff
Role	Name
Senior coach	Chris Scott
Assistant coach	James Kelly
Assistant coach	Steven King
Assistant coach	James Rahilly
Head of player development	Nigel Lappin
Ruck coach	Brad Ottens
Development coach	Aaron Black
Development coach	Shaun Higgins

=== Playing list ===
==== Changes ====
Deletions from playing list
Player	Reason	Ref.
Tom Hawkins	Retired	
Zach Tuohy	Retired	
Gary Rohan	Delisted	
Brandan Parfitt	Delisted	
Emerson Jeka	Delisted	
Phoenix Foster	Delisted	
Oscar Murdoch	Delisted	
James Willis	Delisted	
Mitch Hardie	Delisted	
Joe Furphy	Delisted	

Additions to playing list
Player	Acquired	Ref.
Jack Martin	Delisted free agent	
Bailey Smith	Traded from Western Bulldogs	
Jay Polkinghorne	No. 44, 2024 national draft	
Jacob Molier	No. 52, 2024 national draft	
Lennox Hofmann	No. 66, 2024 national draft	
Keighton Matofai-Forbes	No. 69, 2024 national draft	
Xavier Ivisic	No. 12, 2025 rookie draft	
Patrick Retschko	No. 23, 2025 rookie draft	
Joe Pike	No. 31, 2025 rookie draft	
Cillian Burke	Category B rookie	

==== Statistics ====
Updated to end of season

Key
^	Denotes player who was on the club's standard rookie list, and therefore eligible for senior selection.
#	Denotes Category B rookie where player needed to be elevated to club's senior list during this season to be eligible for senior selection.
‡	Competition leader in statistic category

Playing list and statistics
Player	No.	Games	Goals	Behinds	Kicks	Handballs	Disposals	Tackles	Marks	Hitouts	Milestone(s)
Tom Atkins	30	26	5	4	223	288	511	232‡	52	0	150th match (round 24)
Jed Bews	24	4	0	0	38	18	56	7	24	0	
Mark Blicavs	46	25	11	9	157	198	355	80	96	341	
Jack Bowes	12	21	16	5	187	111	298	59	54	0	
Tanner Bruhn	4	—N/a	—N/a	—N/a	—N/a	—N/a	—N/a	—N/a	—N/a	—N/a	
Cillian Burke#	41	—N/a	—N/a	—N/a	—N/a	—N/a	—N/a	—N/a	—N/a	—N/a	
Jeremy Cameron	5	26	88‡	43‡	288	64	352	46	152	4	700th goal (round 17); 100th club match (round 18)
Jhye Clark	13	10	1	2	56	35	91	18	15	0	
Ted Clohesy^	40	9	2	3	48	23	71	22	16	0	
Brad Close	45	26	19	16	196	131	327	58	72	0	
Toby Conway	6	—N/a	—N/a	—N/a	—N/a	—N/a	—N/a	—N/a	—N/a	—N/a	
Patrick Dangerfield	35	23	30	22	180	170	350	57	77	3	350th match (round 15); 200th club match (round 20)
Sam De Koning	16	23	3	1	169	140	309	23	115	83	
Oliver Dempsey	28	26	35	20	248	193	441	73	100	0	50th match (round 19)
Mitch Duncan	22	9	1	1	76	40	116	13	38	0	300th match (round 11)
Mitchell Edwards	11	—N/a	—N/a	—N/a	—N/a	—N/a	—N/a	—N/a	—N/a	—N/a	
Cameron Guthrie	29	—N/a	—N/a	—N/a	—N/a	—N/a	—N/a	—N/a	—N/a	—N/a	
Zach Guthrie	39	26	1	2	325	129	454	54	169	0	
Jack Henry	38	21	0	2	208	50	258	20	136	0	150th match (round 12)
Oliver Henry	36	15	14	6	80	37	117	27	36	0	
Lennox Hofmann	23	—N/a	—N/a	—N/a	—N/a	—N/a	—N/a	—N/a	—N/a	—N/a	
Max Holmes	9	26	14	10	436	263	699	92	140	0	100th match (qualifying final)
Lawson Humphries	17	25	4	2	310	94	404	50	134	0	
Xavier Ivisic	25	—N/a	—N/a	—N/a	—N/a	—N/a	—N/a	—N/a	—N/a	—N/a	
Mitch Knevitt	10	7	1	3	37	44	81	26	17	0	
Jake Kolodjashnij	8	—N/a	—N/a	—N/a	—N/a	—N/a	—N/a	—N/a	—N/a	—N/a	
Shaun Mannagh	7	23	31	20	305	116	421	112	84	0	
Jack Martin	19	13	12	6	109	61	170	26	78	0	Club debut (round 13)
Keighton Matofai-Forbes	31	—N/a	—N/a	—N/a	—N/a	—N/a	—N/a	—N/a	—N/a	—N/a	
Gryan Miers	32	24	14	13	353	181	534	76	136	0	150th match (round 22)
Jacob Molier	20	—N/a	—N/a	—N/a	—N/a	—N/a	—N/a	—N/a	—N/a	—N/a	
Oisín Mullin^	34	25	2	5	135	111	246	75	75	0	
Shannon Neale	33	25	44	18	129	80	209	69	99	108	
Mark O'Connor	42	25	1	4	224	122	346	66	126	0	
Connor O'Sullivan	14	25	0	0	179	135	314	46	144	1	
Joe Pike	37	—N/a	—N/a	—N/a	—N/a	—N/a	—N/a	—N/a	—N/a	—N/a	
Jay Polkinghorne	2	—N/a	—N/a	—N/a	—N/a	—N/a	—N/a	—N/a	—N/a	—N/a	
Patrick Retschko	27	—N/a	—N/a	—N/a	—N/a	—N/a	—N/a	—N/a	—N/a	—N/a	
Bailey Smith	3	23	8	7	454	266	720	114	111	0	Club debut (round 1)
Rhys Stanley	1	19	6	5	105	81	186	36	39	473	
Tyson Stengle	18	24	34	32	195	102	297	73	73	0	100th match (round 15)
George Stevens	15	2	1	2	16	12	28	3	4	0	AFL debut (round 18)
Tom Stewart	44	20	1	0	296	75	371	29	147	0	
Oliver Wiltshire	21	2	1	1	10	3	13	3	4	0	AFL debut (round 7)

=== Results ===
Key
H	Home game
A	Away game
N	Neutral venue game
QF	Qualifying final
PF	Preliminary final
GF	Grand Final

Table of 2025 AFL season results
Round	Date	Result	Score			Opponent	Score			Ground		Attendance	Ladder
Round	Date	Result	G	B	T	Opponent	G	B	T	Ground		Attendance	Ladder
OR						~~Brisbane Lions~~				~~The Gabba~~	~~A~~		—N/a
1	15 March	Won	23	9	147	Fremantle	10	9	69	GMHBA Stadium	H	25,372	4th
2	22 March	Lost	13	13	91	St Kilda	15	8	98	Marvel Stadium	A	36,663	7th ▼
3	29 March	Lost	9	7	61	Brisbane Lions	10	10	70	The Gabba	A	27,966	9th ▼
4	4 April	Won	12	13	85	Melbourne	6	10	46	GMHBA Stadium	H	30,397	8th ▲
5	10 April	Won	18	11	119	Adelaide	15	10	100	Adelaide Oval	A	50,073	6th ▲
6	21 April	Won	12	14	86	Hawthorn	11	13	79	Melbourne Cricket Ground	H	88,746	6th
7	27 April	Lost	12	4	76	Carlton	14	10	94	Melbourne Cricket Ground	A	67,658	7th ▼
8	3 May	Won	13	12	90	Collingwood	12	15	87	Melbourne Cricket Ground	A	82,514	7th
9	11 May	Lost	14	17	101	Greater Western Sydney	16	9	105	GMHBA Stadium	H	28,407	7th
10	17 May	Won	17	13	115	Port Adelaide	5	9	39	Adelaide Oval	A	35,509	7th
11	22 May	Won	20	7	127	Western Bulldogs	16	17	113	GMHBA Stadium	H	32,641	5th ▲
12	1 June	Won	17	14	116	West Coast	11	7	73	Optus Stadium	A	42,501	5th
13	7 June	Won	9	7	61	Gold Coast	5	7	37	GMHBA Stadium	H	29,502	4th ▲
14	14 June	Won	23	13	151	Essendon	8	8	56	Melbourne Cricket Ground	A	61,643	2nd ▲
15	20 June	Lost	6	15	51	Brisbane Lions	14	8	92	GMHBA Stadium	H	35,367	3rd ▼
16	Bye												4th ▼
17	5 July	Won	18	16	124	Richmond	7	10	52	GMHBA Stadium	H	31,060	4th
18	12 July	Lost	13	7	85	Greater Western Sydney	17	9	111	Engie Stadium	A	13,349	4th
19	20 July	Won	17	11	113	St Kilda	12	10	82	GMHBA Stadium	H	29,985	4th
20	26 July	Won	22	18	150	North Melbourne	7	7	49	Marvel Stadium	A	25,445	4th
21	3 August	Won	23	15	153	Port Adelaide	9	11	65	GMHBA Stadium	H	28,064	4th
22	8 August	Won	15	19	109	Essendon	10	5	65	GMHBA Stadium	H	30,289	2nd ▲
23	17 August	Won	16	15	111	Sydney	10	8	68	Sydney Cricket Ground	A	37,656	2nd
24	23 August	Won	14	19	103	Richmond	9	10	64	Melbourne Cricket Ground	A	46,109	2nd
QF	5 September	Won	16	16	112	Brisbane Lions	11	8	74	Melbourne Cricket Ground	N	86,364	—
PF	19 September	Won	17	13	115	Hawthorn	13	7	85	Melbourne Cricket Ground	N	99,567	—
GF	27 September	Lost	11	9	75	Brisbane Lions	18	14	122	Melbourne Cricket Ground	N	100,022	—

=== Ladder ===
Pos	Team	Pld	W	L	D	PF	PA	PP	Pts	Qualification
1	Adelaide	23	18	5	0	2278	1635	139.3	72	Finals series
2	Geelong	23	17	6	0	2425	1714	141.5	68	Finals series
3	Brisbane Lions (P)	23	16	6	1	2061	1804	114.2	66	Finals series
4	Collingwood	23	16	7	0	1991	1627	122.4	64	Finals series
5	Greater Western Sydney	23	16	7	0	2114	1834	115.3	64	Finals series
6	Fremantle	23	16	7	0	1978	1815	109.0	64	Finals series
7	Gold Coast	23	15	8	0	2173	1740	124.9	60	Finals series
8	Hawthorn	23	15	8	0	2045	1691	120.9	60	Finals series
9	Western Bulldogs	23	14	9	0	2493	1820	137.0	56	
10	Sydney	23	12	11	0	1845	1902	97.0	48	
11	Carlton	23	9	14	0	1799	1861	96.7	36	
12	St Kilda	23	9	14	0	1839	2077	88.5	36	
13	Port Adelaide	23	9	14	0	1705	2136	79.8	36	
14	Melbourne	23	7	16	0	1902	2038	93.3	28	
15	Essendon	23	6	17	0	1535	2209	69.5	24	
16	North Melbourne	23	5	17	1	1805	2365	76.3	22	
17	Richmond	23	5	18	0	1449	2197	66.0	20	
18	West Coast	23	1	22	0	1466	2438	60.1	4	

Source: afl.com.au
Rules for classification: 1) points; 2) percentage; 3) number of points for
(P) Premiers

=== Awards ===
==== League awards ====
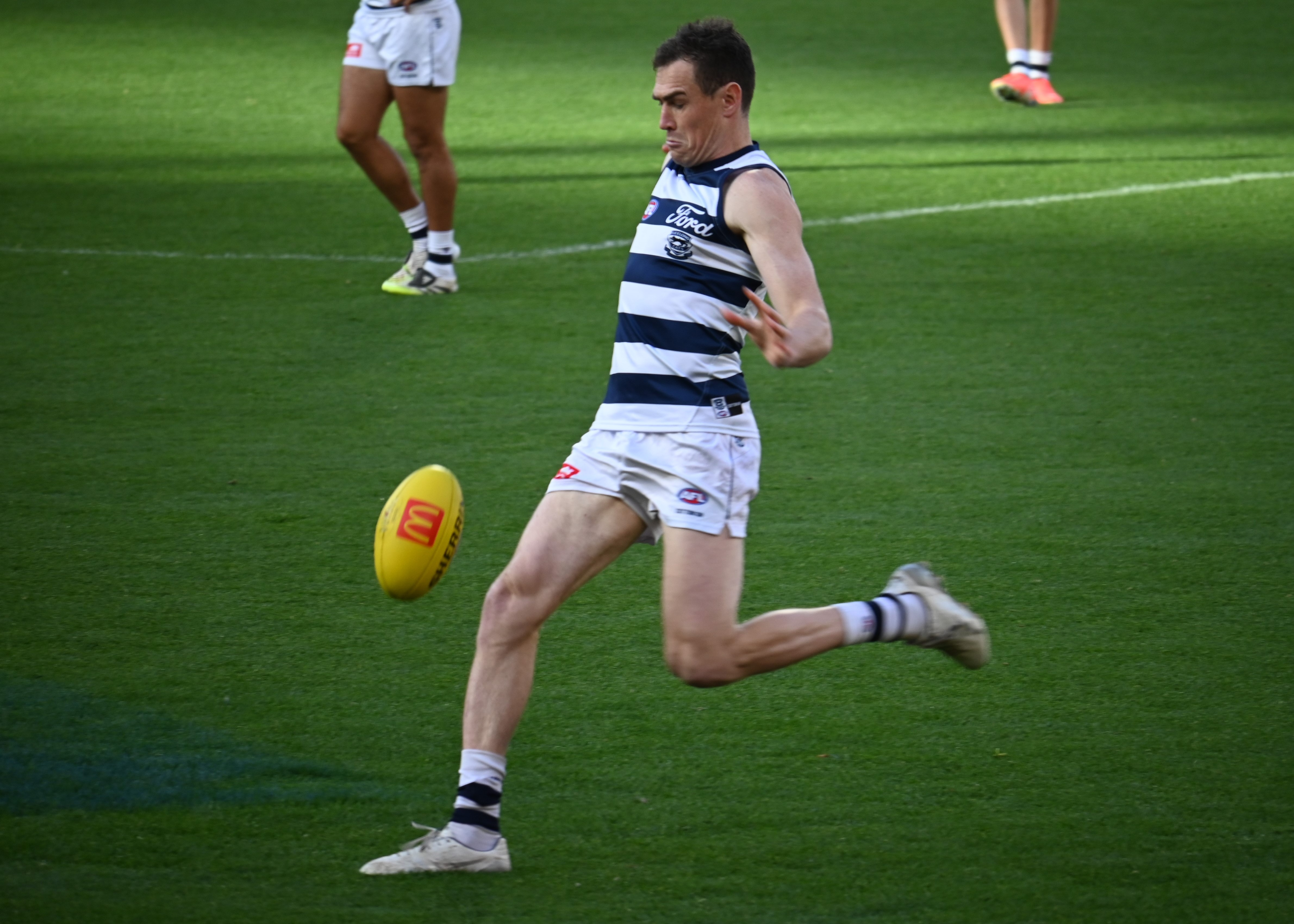
Jeremy Cameron won his second Coleman Medal after kicking a career high 83 goals during the home and away season.

- Coleman Medal: Jeremy Cameron (83 goals)
- All-Australian:
  - Jeremy Cameron (Forward — captain)
  - Bailey Smith (Midfield) (Note: Max Holmes was also selected in the initial squad.)
- AFL Coaches Association — Champion Player: Bailey Smith (103 votes) (Note: Joint winner with Gold Coast's Noah Anderson.)
- AFL Coaches Association — Best Young Player Award: Shaun Mannagh
- 2025 AFL Rising Star: Connor O'Sullivan (Nominee – Round 2)
- AFLPA 22 Under 22 team: Oliver Dempsey (Interchange)

==== Club Awards ====
- Carji Greeves Medal: Max Holmes (175 votes)
- Best Young Player Award: Connor O'Sullivan
- Tom Harley Best Clubman: Tom Atkins and Mark Blicavs
- Carter Family Community Champion Award: Shaun Mannagh

== VFL team ==
Geelong Football Club
2025 VFL season
- President: Grant McCabe
- Coach: Mark Corrigan (3rd season)
- Captains: Dan Capiron (2nd season)
- Home ground: GMHBA Stadium
- VFL season: 9 wins, 9 losses (12th)
- Best and Fairest: Marcus Herbert
- Leading goalkicker: Jay Polkinghorne (31)

=== Season summary ===
Mark Corrigan continued as coach of the club's VFL program for a third season, with Dan Capiron continuing as captain. Marcus Herbert was appointed as vice-captain.

In March, after returning to the club for the 2025 season, Nathan Kreuger was selected in the initial 43-player squad for the VFL State Team to play the SANFL State Team in April. He would be named at centre-halfback in the VFL's 11-point victory.

Capiron played his 100th VFL match for the club in the round 2 match against Northern Bullants.

The team's campaign was bookended by three-match winning streaks, but a six-match losing streak through the middle of the season proved costly. Geelong missed the VFL finals series by one win and percentage.

Ian Fuller was honoured at the VFL Awards night, taking out the Alex Gillon VFL Volunteer of the Year award. Fuller's late father Vic Fuller had previously won the same award in 2015.

=== Results ===
Key
H	Home game
A	Away game

Table of season results
Round	Date	Result	Score			Opponent	Score			Ground	
Round	Date	Result	G	B	T	Opponent	G	B	T	Ground	
1	23 March	Won	12	19	91	Sandringham	8	12	60	Trevor Barker Beach Oval	A
2	29 March	Won	13	12	90	Northern Bullants	9	6	60	GMHBA Stadium	H
3	4 April	Won	16	13	109	Casey	14	9	93	GMHBA Stadium	H
4	20 April	Lost	11	7	73	Box Hill	18	11	119	GMHBA Stadium	H
5	27 April	Lost	12	12	84	Carlton	13	10	88	Ikon Park	A
6	Bye										
7	11 May	Lost	11	9	75	Greater Western Sydney	16	11	107	GMHBA Stadium	H
8	17 May	Lost	6	11	47	Port Melbourne	6	15	51	ETU Stadium	A
9	23 May	Lost	11	5	71	Footscray	14	10	94	Mission Whitten Oval	A
10	1 June	Lost	6	12	48	Williamstown	10	14	74	DSV Stadium	A
11	8 June	Won	10	12	72	Gold Coast	11	3	69	GMHBA Stadium	H
12	14 June	Won	11	15	81	Werribee	12	7	79	Melbourne Avalon Airport Oval	A
13	21 June	Lost	12	13	85	Brisbane	16	21	117	GMHBA Stadium	H
14	Bye										
15	6 July	Lost	12	11	83	Richmond	14	4	88	GMHBA Stadium	H
16	12 July	Won	18	7	115	Greater Western Sydney	9	11	65	Engie Stadium	A
17	19 July	Lost	8	12	60	Collingwood	11	9	75	Mission Whitten Oval	N
18	27 July	Won	16	8	104	North Melbourne	15	12	102	Arden Street Oval	A
19	Bye										
20	9 August	Won	10	13	73	Essendon	9	5	59	GMHBA Stadium	H
21	17 August	Won	16	15	111	Sydney	10	6	66	Tramway Oval	A

=== Ladder ===
Pos	Team	Pld	W	L	D	PF	PA	PP	Pts	Qualification
10	Williamstown	18	10	8	0	1574	1504	104.7	40	Wildcard finals
11	Coburg	18	9	9	0	1525	1452	105.0	36	
12	Geelong (R)	18	9	9	0	1472	1466	100.4	36	
13	Carlton (R)	18	8	10	0	1387	1586	87.5	32	
14	Gold Coast (R)	18	7	10	1	1466	1493	98.2	30	

Source: AFL.com.au
Rules for classification: 1) points; 2) percentage; 3) number of points for
(R) Club is the reserves team of a senior club of the Australian Football League

=== Awards ===
==== Club Awards ====
- Best and Fairest: Marcus Herbert
- Little Vic Award (Best first year player): Patrick Kelly

== AFL Women's team ==
Geelong Football Club
2025 AFL Women's season
- President: Grant McCabe
- Coach: Daniel Lowther (5th season)
- Captains: Meg McDonald (6th season)
- Home ground: GMHBA Stadium
- AFLW season: 5 wins, 7 losses (13th)
- Best and Fairest: Georgie Prespakis
- Leading goalkicker: Aishling Moloney (17)
- Highest home attendance: 3,416 vs. Hawthorn (round 7)
- Lowest home attendance: 2,114 vs. Sydney (round 3)

=== Season summary ===
In February the head of the club's AFLW program Brett Johnson departed the club, with his replacement announced as Dominique Condo in April. Condo joined the club from Richmond having previously worked with Geelong from 2015 to 2021 in a number of roles.

The team played two preseason fixtures in July and August, defeating St Kilda at RSEA Stadium in a match simulation 8.11 (59) to 4.5 (29) on 26 July. Their official practice match was against Gold Coast at People First Stadium on 2 August, with the Cats tuning up for the season with a 10.7 (67) to 1.3 (9) victory.

Before the club's final round match against Melbourne, captain Meg McDonald announced that she would retired at the end of the season. McDonald had played over 70 matches for the club after joining the club ahead of Geelong's inaugural season in 2019.

Georgie Prespakis won her second club best and fairest award, polling 185 votes. Prespakis averaged over 25 disposals per match and led the league for total clearances. Finishing behind Prespakis in the votes was Nina Morrison (110 votes) and Mikayla Bowen (76 votes).

In the league's major awards, Prespakis would finish third in the AFL Coaches' Association AFLW Champion Player of the Year, and second in the 2025 AFL Women's best and fairest award behind North Melbourne's Ashleigh Riddell. Prespakis was named on the interchange bench in the 2025 AFL Women's All-Australian team, her second selection to the team of the year. Selected in the wider All Australian squad, but missing out on the final team selection were Mikayla Bowen and Aishling Moloney.

=== Coaching staff ===
Daniel Lowther continued as head coach of the AFLW program for a fifth season. It would be his final season in the role after he stepped down from the position at the end of the 2025 season.

Tennille Cuttiford was appointed as the program's High Performance Manager, while former player Renee Garing was appointed as Player Development Manager.

Continuing as assistant coaches were Andrew Bruce (forwards) and Elise Coventry (defence). Joining the club in 2025 as midfield coach is Nathan Brown who after retiring from the AFL has been involved in coaching and the football pathways program at Geelong College.

Current men's team player Tom Atkins joined the coaching staff as a development coach.

2025 Geelong coaching staff
Role	Name
Senior coach	Daniel Lowther
Assistant coach (forwards)	Andrew Bruce
Assistant coach (midfield)	Nathan Brown
Assistant coach (defence)	Elise Coventry
Development coach and bench coach	David Morgan
Development coach	Tom Atkins

=== Playing list ===
==== Changes ====
Deletions from playing list
Player	Reason	Ref.
Darcy Moloney	Traded to Sydney	
Abbey McDonald	Delisted	
Lilly Pearce	Delisted	
Brooke Plummer	Delisted	
Olivia Fuller	Delisted	

Additions to playing list
Player	Acquired	Ref.
Caitlin Tipping	Recruited from Volleyball Australia	
Lexi Gregor	No. 10, 2024 national draft	
Sienna Tallariti	No. 18, 2024 national draft	
Piper Dunlop	No. 37, 2024 national draft	
Emma Kilpatrick	Replacement player signing from West Adelaide (SANFLW) (Note: Replacement player for Chantel Emonson following her pregnancy announcement.)	
Erica Fowler	Replacement player signing from Sandringham (VFLW) (Note: Replacement player for Anna-Rose Kennedy who was inactive for the 2025 season.)	

==== Statistics ====
Updated as at the end of the 2025 season

Key
#	Denotes player who was on the club's rookie list.
^	Denotes player who was on the club's inactive list.

Playing list and statistics
Player	No.	Games	Goals	Behinds	Kicks	Handballs	Disposals	Marks	Tackles	Hitouts	Milestone(s)
Mikayla Bowen	1	12	6	6	114	145	259	40	80	0	—N/a
Bella Smith	2	6	0	0	19	24	43	6	17	0	—N/a
Amy McDonald	3	12	1	3	105	132	237	19	61	0	—N/a
Caitlin Tipping	4	5	0	0	15	6	21	4	7	54	AFLW debut (round 8)
Jacqueline Parry	5	12	11	14	104	52	156	60	34	13	—N/a
Julia Crockett-Grills	6	7	6	5	68	28	96	19	23	0	—N/a
Kate Surman	7	12	1	6	71	62	133	17	42	0	—N/a
Kate Darby	8	5	0	0	13	5	18	5	17	28	—N/a
Nina Morrison	9	12	6	2	164	79	243	21	92	0	—N/a
Georgie Rankin	10	12	0	0	85	63	148	26	33	0	—N/a
Meg McDonald	11	6	0	0	23	22	45	9	8	0	—N/a
Kate Kenny#	12	12	4	2	79	39	118	23	30	0	—N/a
Sienna Tallariti	13	7	0	0	44	33	77	13	5	0	AFLW debut (round 4)
Chloe Scheer	14	—N/a	—N/a	—N/a	—N/a	—N/a	—N/a	—N/a	—N/a	—N/a	—N/a
Shelley Scott	15	—N/a	—N/a	—N/a	—N/a	—N/a	—N/a	—N/a	—N/a	—N/a	—N/a
Chantel Emonson^	16	—N/a	—N/a	—N/a	—N/a	—N/a	—N/a	—N/a	—N/a	—N/a	—N/a
Erica Fowler	17	8	1	2	32	15	47	14	21	12	Club debut (round 2); 50th AFLW match (round 5)
Anna-Rose Kennedy^	18	—N/a	—N/a	—N/a	—N/a	—N/a	—N/a	—N/a	—N/a	—N/a	—N/a
Zali Friswell	20	11	1	0	56	83	139	17	26	0	50th match (round 10)
Rebecca Webster	21	12	1	0	109	80	189	35	32	0	—N/a
Rachel Kearns	22	12	2	0	91	46	137	28	31	0	—N/a
Bryde O'Rourke	23	5	0	0	16	14	30	6	8	0	—N/a
Chantal Mason	24	8	6	8	41	11	52	12	13	2	—N/a
Caitlin Thorne	25	6	1	2	26	15	41	10	28	0	—N/a
Claudia Gunjaca	26	11	0	0	75	51	126	37	28	0	50th match (round 12)
Emma Kilpatrick	27	11	1	2	78	33	111	19	29	0	AFLW debut (round 1)
Lexi Gregor	30	9	0	0	42	22	64	18	10	0	AFLW debut (round 4)
Gabbi Featherston	32	3	0	0	6	4	10	2	5	5	—N/a
Piper Dunlop	38	9	0	0	17	44	61	8	18	83	AFLW debut (round 1)
Georgie Prespakis	41	12	4	6	174	136	310	24	71	0	50th match (round 9)
Melissa Bragg	44	3	0	0	4	9	13	2	3	13	—N/a
Aishling Moloney#	45	12	17	14	123	48	171	37	27	4	—N/a

=== Results ===
Key
H	Home game
A	Away game

Table of season results
Round	Date	Result	Score			Opponent	Score			Ground		Attendance	Ladder
Round	Date	Result	G	B	T	Opponent	G	B	T	Ground		Attendance	Ladder
1	16 August	Lost	3	3	21	North Melbourne	8	3	51	GMHBA Stadium	H	2,764	16th
2	24 August	Lost	3	9	27	Adelaide	10	5	65	Unley Oval	A	3,088	16th
3	30 August	Lost	6	9	45	Sydney	7	8	50	GMHBA Stadium	H	2,114	16th
4	7 September	Won	8	10	58	Essendon	4	3	27	Windy Hill	A	2,359	11th ▲
5	14 September	Won	8	11	59	Richmond	4	5	29	Ikon Park	A	2,351	10th ▲
6	20 September	Won	6	9	45	Port Adelaide	6	4	40	Alberton Oval	A	2,736	8th ▲
7	25 September	Lost	5	5	35	Hawthorn	6	6	42	GMHBA Stadium	H	3,146	10th ▼
8	5 October	Lost	5	7	35	Carlton	7	13	55	GMHBA Stadium	H	2,907	10th
9	11 October	Won	11	6	72	Greater Western Sydney	6	9	45	GMHBA Stadium	H	2,509	10th
10	17 October	Lost	2	7	19	West Coast	7	8	50	Sullivan Logistics Stadium	A	2,428	13th ▼
11	26 October	Won	6	1	37	Western Bulldogs	3	8	26	Mars Stadium	A	1,332	12th ▲
12	1 November	Lost	6	9	45	Melbourne	9	5	59	GMHBA Stadium	H	2,214	13th ▼

=== Ladder ===
Pos	Team	Pld	W	L	D	PF	PA	PP	Pts	Qualification
1	North Melbourne (P)	12	12	0	0	868	270	321.5	48	Finals series
2	Melbourne	12	9	3	0	684	327	209.2	36	Finals series
3	Brisbane	12	9	3	0	652	403	161.8	36	Finals series
4	Hawthorn	12	9	3	0	451	433	104.2	36	Finals series
5	Carlton	12	8	4	0	554	474	116.9	32	Finals series
6	Adelaide	12	7	5	0	515	460	112.0	28	Finals series
7	St Kilda	12	7	5	0	392	407	96.3	28	Finals series
8	West Coast	12	6	6	0	472	423	111.6	24	Finals series
9	Sydney	12	6	6	0	542	504	107.5	24	
10	Port Adelaide	12	6	6	0	631	601	105.0	24	
11	Fremantle	12	6	6	0	414	512	80.9	24	
12	Western Bulldogs	12	5	7	0	415	358	115.9	20	
13	Geelong	12	5	7	0	500	539	92.8	20	
14	Essendon	12	4	8	0	331	552	60.0	16	
15	Collingwood	12	3	9	0	314	505	62.2	12	
16	Richmond	12	2	10	0	349	583	59.9	8	
17	Greater Western Sydney	12	2	10	0	401	681	58.9	8	
18	Gold Coast	12	2	10	0	319	772	41.3	8	

Source: afl.com.au
Rules for classification: 1) points; 2) percentage; 3) number of points for
(P) Premiers

=== Awards ===
==== League awards ====
- 2025 AFL Women's All-Australian team: Georgie Prespakis (interchange)
- AFLPA 22 Under 22 team: Georgie Prespakis (midfield) (vice captain)
- Jim Stynes Community Leadership Award: Kate Darby

==== Club Awards ====
- Best and fairest: Georgie Prespakis
- The 'Hoops' Award: Meg McDonald
- Community Champion: Kate Darby

== VFLW team ==
Geelong Football Club
2025 VFL Women's season
- President: Grant McCabe
- Coach: Taylah Hassett (1st season)
- Captains: Mel Staunton (1st season)
- Home grounds: GMHBA Stadium; Deakin University Elite Sports Precinct
- VFLW season: 3 wins, 11 losses (11th)
- Best and Fairest: Hayley Peck
- Leading goalkicker: Stephanie O'Kane (8)

=== Season summary ===
Following an unsuccessful 2024 season, the club appointed Taylah Hassett as the new head coach of the VFL Women's team. Hassett (aged 22 when hired) was previously an AFL Barwon Female Football premiership winning playing-coach with the Grovedale Football Club.

Melanie Staunton was appointed captain of the squad, with Abby Favell as vice-captain.

In March, Poppy Schaap was selected in the 50-player squad for the VFL Women's representative match against the SANFL Women's competition, but was not selected in the final team.

The team improved in the second half of the season to win three of their final six matches to avoid a second successive wooden spoon.

Both Abby Favell and Hayley Peck were included in the initial 30-player squad for the 2025 VFLW Team of the Year. Favell kicked five goals in her 14 matches for the season, averaging almost 22 disposals per game, while Peck scored two goals in her 14 matches, averaging 15 disposals per match and over 23 hitouts. Neither player would be selected for the final VFLW Team of the Year.

=== Results ===
Key
H	Home game
A	Away game

Table of season results
Round	Date	Result	Score			Opponent	Score			Ground	
Round	Date	Result	G	B	T	Opponent	G	B	T	Ground	
1	19 April	Lost	4	6	30	Box Hill	14	4	88	Deakin University Elite Sports Precinct	H
2	26 April	Lost	4	5	29	Carlton	7	6	48	Deakin University Elite Sports Precinct	H
3	3 May	Lost	2	5	17	Williamstown	10	4	64	DSV Stadium	A
4	10 May	Lost	2	5	17	Sandringham	10	6	66	Deakin University Elite Sports Precinct	H
5	17 May	Lost	0	4	4	Port Melbourne	9	7	61	ETU Stadium	A
6	24 May	Lost	3	6	24	Essendon	9	10	64	Deakin University Elite Sports Precinct	H
7	31 May	Lost	3	3	21	Darebin	7	4	46	RMIT University, Bundoora	A
8	14 June	Lost	3	4	22	North Melbourne	17	8	110	Melbourne Avalon Airport Oval	A
9	22 June	Won	8	8	56	Carlton	2	2	14	Ikon Park	A
10	28 June	Won	8	9	57	Western Bulldogs	5	4	34	Deakin University Elite Sports Precinct	H
11	6 July	Lost	4	5	29	Casey	8	7	55	Casey Fields	A
12	12 July	Lost	5	2	32	Sandringham	6	3	39	Trevor Barker Beach Oval	A
13	19 July	Lost	3	3	21	Collingwood	9	2	56	Deakin University Elite Sports Precinct	H
12	3 August	Won	3	10	28	Darebin	3	8	26	KFC Oval, Highton (Note: Match played at Queens Park, Highton the home of Geelong Amateur Football & Netball Club)	H

=== Ladder ===
Pos	Team	Pld	W	L	D	PF	PA	PP	Pts
8	Darebin	14	7	7	0	388	431	90.0	28
9	Western Bulldogs	14	5	9	0	386	541	71.3	20
10	Carlton	14	4	10	0	398	549	72.5	16
11	Geelong Cats	14	3	11	0	387	771	50.2	12
12	Casey	14	2	12	0	384	720	53.3	8

Rules for classification: 1) points; 2) percentage; 3) number of points for.

=== Awards ===
==== Club Awards ====
- Best and Fairest: Hayley Peck
