= 2023 Geelong Football Club season =

The 2023 Geelong Football Club season was the club's 159th season playing Australian rules football, with the club competing in their 124th season in the Australian Football League (AFL). Geelong also fielded a women's team in the 2023 AFL Women's season, and men's and women's reserves team in the Victorian Football League (VFL) and the VFL Women's (VFLW) respectively.

== AFL team ==
Geelong Football Club
2023 AFL season
- President: Craig Drummond
- Coach: Chris Scott (13th season)
- Captains: Patrick Dangerfield (1st season)
- Home ground: GMHBA Stadium
- AFL season: 10 wins, 12 losses, 1 draw (12th)
- Best and Fairest: Tom Stewart
- Leading goalkicker: Jeremy Cameron (53)
- Highest home attendance: 86,595 vs. Collingwood (Round 1)
- Lowest home attendance: 19,617 vs. Melbourne (Round 15)
- Average home attendance: 31,271
- Club membership: 82,115

=== Season summary ===
It was the club's thirteenth AFL season under senior coach Chris Scott, with Patrick Dangerfield appointed as club captain, replacing the retired Joel Selwood.

After a poor start to the season, Geelong would become the first reigning premiers to lose their opening three matches since 1976.

With the debut of Oisín Mullin in just his fourth game of Australian football, Geelong fielded three Irish players against Greater Western Sydney in round 11, becoming the first club in VFL/AFL history to field three in the same team.

After losing to St Kilda in the penultimate round of the season, Geelong were eliminated from finals contention, missing the finals for just the second time in Chris Scott's 13-year tenure. Geelong joining Richmond (2021), Western Bulldogs (2017) and Hawthorn (2009) as premiers in the last 20 years to miss finals the following season. A number of injuries to key players was one of the driving reasons behind the club's slide down the ladder.

Three consecutive losses to end the season saw the club equal its lowest ever finish, ending up in 12th place on the ladder.

Forward Jeremy Cameron would be the club's leading votegetter at the 2023 Brownlow Medal count, polling 13 votes including two best-on-ground matches.

=== Pre-season ===
Geelong defeated Hawthorn in a pre-season scratch match at GMHBA Stadium played over eight periods with both senior and reserves players. The final score was Geelong 31.34 (220) versus Hawthorn 18.25 (133). Geelong also played an official AFL practice match against Brisbane Lions on 2 March, and were defeated 13.13 (91) versus Geelong's 6.9 (45). Geelong's home-and-away season began on 17 March against Collingwood at the Melbourne Cricket Ground (MCG).

=== Coaching staff ===
Chris Scott continued as the club's men's senior coach for a thirteenth season, having signed a two-year contract extension until the end of the 2024 season. Scott would coach his 300th AFL game in round 15 against Melbourne, with Geelong winning by 15 points.

Scott would break Reg Hickey's long-standing record of 304 matches as coach of the club, coaching his 305th match in round 20 against Fremantle.

2023 Geelong coaching staff
Role	Name
Senior coach	Chris Scott
Assistant coach	Nigel Lappin
Assistant coach	Shaun Grigg
Assistant coach	James Kelly
Assistant coach	Shane O'Bree
Head of player development	Matthew Egan
Development coach	Daisy Pearce
Development coach	Josh Jenkins
Ruck coach	Brad Ottens

=== Playing list ===
==== Changes ====
Deletions from playing list
Player	Reason	Ref.
Cooper Stephens	Traded to Hawthorn	
Francis Evans	Delisted^{[a]}	
Shaun Higgins	Retired	
Joel Selwood	Retired	
Luke Dahlhaus	Retired	
Quinton Narkle	Delisted^{[b]}	
Nick Stevens	Delisted	
Paul Tsapatolis	Delisted	
Zane Williams	Delisted	

Additions to playing list
Player	Acquired	Ref.
Tanner Bruhn	Traded from Greater Western Sydney	
Jack Bowes	Traded from Gold Coast	
Oliver Henry	Traded from Collingwood	
Jhye Clark	No. 8, 2022 national draft	
Phoenix Foster	No. 52, 2022 national draft	
Oscar Murdoch	No. 18, 2023 rookie draft	
Osca Riccardi	No. 32, 2023 rookie draft	
Oisín Mullin	Category B rookie	
Ted Clohesy	Category B rookie	
Mitch Hardie	No. 7, 2023 mid-season rookie draft	

- ^{a} Francis Evans was subsequently signed by Port Adelaide during the 2022 free agency period.
- ^{b} Quinton Narkle was subsequently selected by Port Adelaide in the 2023 mid-season rookie draft after starting the season with Essendon in their VFL squad.

==== Statistics ====
Updated as at round 24

Key
^	Denotes player who was on the club's standard rookie list, and therefore eligible for senior selection.
#	Denotes Category B rookie where player needed to be elevated to club's senior list during this season to be eligible for senior selection.

Playing list and statistics
Player	No.	Games	Goals	Behinds	Kicks	Handballs	Disposals	Tackles	Marks	Hitouts	Milestone(s)
Tom Atkins	30	23	4	1	195	251	446	175	33	0	100th match (round 19)
Jed Bews	24	15	0	1	79	78	157	30	36	0	
Mark Blicavs	46	19	12	7	154	147	301	88	65	202	
Jack Bowes	12	17	4	6	156	105	261	88	65	0	Club debut (round 2); 100th match (round 24)
Tanner Bruhn	4	19	8	1	176	134	310	92	56	0	Club debut (round 1)
Jeremy Cameron	5	20	53	34	255	66	321	27	114	1	
Jonathon Ceglar	15	6	0	0	34	42	76	8	21	153	
Jhye Clark	13	1	0	0	4	2	6	5	0	0	AFL debut (round 9)
Ted Clohesy#	40	1	0	0	2	4	6	1	1	0	AFL debut (round 24)
Brad Close	45	21	21	6	124	153	277	56	53	0	
Toby Conway	6	1	0	0	2	4	6	3	1	24	AFL debut (round 24)
Patrick Dangerfield	35	18	11	8	213	156	369	67	59	0	
Sam De Koning	16	19	0	0	129	105	234	11	86	32	
Oliver Dempsey^	28	5	1	3	16	22	38	10	8	0	
Mitch Duncan	22	16	5	5	224	135	359	40	110	0	
Phoenix Foster	19	0	—N/a	—N/a	—N/a	—N/a	—N/a	—N/a	—N/a	—N/a	
Cameron Guthrie	29	6	0	0	77	57	134	31	25	0	
Zach Guthrie	39	23	3	2	251	120	371	59	128	0	
Tom Hawkins	26	20	49	26	146	68	214	18	91	63	
Jack Henry	38	11	4	0	81	37	118	15	47	6	
Oliver Henry	36	22	41	20	139	86	225	35	82	0	Club debut (round 1)
Max Holmes	9	21	7	5	228	172	400	88	69	0	50th match (round 23)
Mitch Knevitt	10	8	2	3	61	34	95	19	24	0	
Jake Kolodjashnij	8	19	0	3	136	82	218	29	89	0	
Flynn Kroeger	25	0	—N/a	—N/a	—N/a	—N/a	—N/a	—N/a	—N/a	—N/a	
Sam Menegola	27	1	0	1	17	10	27	3	6	0	
Gryan Miers	32	23	7	13	259	179	438	67	108	0	100th match (round 18)
Oisín Mullin#	34	6	0	1	22	27	49	9	12	0	AFL debut (round 11)
Oscar Murdoch^	19	0	—N/a	—N/a	—N/a	—N/a	—N/a	—N/a	—N/a	—N/a	
Shannon Neale	33	3	1	2	9	12	21	9	12	19	
Mark O'Connor	42	22	3	2	186	123	309	68	96	0	100th match (round 14)
Brandan Parfitt	3	9	1	1	58	56	114	50	6	0	
Esava Ratugolea	17	16	0	0	93	49	142	22	70	2	
Osca Riccardi^	21	0	—N/a	—N/a	—N/a	—N/a	—N/a	—N/a	—N/a	—N/a	
Gary Rohan	23	15	18	9	89	45	134	35	45	5	
Sam Simpson	37	6	7	3	26	29	55	7	12	0	
Isaac Smith	7	22	10	12	326	147	473	36	139	0	
Rhys Stanley	1	13	0	3	78	77	155	32	30	368	
Tyson Stengle	18	19	27	9	146	71	217	42	48	0	
Tom Stewart	44	22	1	0	408	99	507	43	182	0	Acting captain (rounds 9–12, 15)
Zach Tuohy	2	20	6	9	248	115	363	32	71	0	150th club match (round 23)
Cooper Whyte	11	1	0	0	1	0	1	1	0	0	AFL debut (round 2)
James Willis	20	0	—N/a	—N/a	—N/a	—N/a	—N/a	—N/a	—N/a	—N/a	

=== Results ===
Key
H	Home game
A	Away game
N	Neutral venue game

Table of 2023 AFL season results
Round	Date	Result	Score			Opponent	Score			Ground		Attendance	Ladder
Round	Date	Result	G	B	T	Opponent	G	B	T	Ground		Attendance	Ladder
1	17 March	Lost	16	7	103	Collingwood	19	11	125	Melbourne Cricket Ground	H	86,595	13th
2	23 March	Lost	12	10	82	Carlton	13	12	90	Melbourne Cricket Ground	A	55,861	14th
3	2 April	Lost	7	12	54	Gold Coast	10	13	73	Heritage Bank Stadium	A	13,122	18th
4	10 April	Won	19	13	127	Hawthorn	6	9	45	Melbourne Cricket Ground	H	65,355	13th
5	16 April	Won	21	10	136	West Coast	13	11	89	Adelaide Oval	N	30,120	10th
6	22 April	Won	20	10	130	Sydney	5	7	37	GMHBA Stadium	H	23,134	9th
7	30 April	Won	20	12	132	Essendon	16	8	104	Melbourne Cricket Ground	A	67,457	7th
8	6 May	Won	14	14	98	Adelaide	11	6	76	GMHBA Stadium	H	21,415	6th
9	12 May	Lost	11	12	78	Richmond	16	6	102	Melbourne Cricket Ground	A	58,141	7th
10	20 May	Lost	11	11	77	Fremantle	16	10	106	Optus Stadium	A	45,811	7th
11	27 May	Lost	10	14	74	Greater Western Sydney	12	9	81	GMHBA Stadium	H	21,349	10th
12	3 June	Won	15	7	97	Western Bulldogs	10	15	75	Marvel Stadium	A	41,944	8th
13	Bye												9th
14	15 June	Lost	11	6	72	Port Adelaide	16	14	110	Adelaide Oval	A	36,316	10th
15	22 June	Won	11	12	78	Melbourne	8	15	63	GMHBA Stadium	H	19,617	9th
16	30 June	Draw	7	12	54	Sydney	6	18	54	Sydney Cricket Ground	A	32,098	9th
17	9 July	Won	19	11	125	North Melbourne	9	9	63	GMHBA Stadium	H	21,066	8th
18	15 July	Won	18	14	122	Essendon	7	3	45	GMHBA Stadium	H	23,185	5th
19	22 July	Lost	7	11	53	Brisbane Lions	9	10	64	The Gabba	A	32,586	8th
20	29 July	Lost	9	10	64	Fremantle	10	11	71	GMHBA Stadium	H	21,619	9th
21	5 August	Won	14	13	97	Port Adelaide	12	13	85	GMHBA Stadium	H	21,279	9th
22	11 August	Lost	15	11	101	Collingwood	16	13	109	Melbourne Cricket Ground	A	78,749	11th
23	19 August	Lost	8	7	55	St Kilda	12	16	88	Marvel Stadium	A	40,103	11th
24	26 August	Lost	11	13	79	Western Bulldogs	16	8	104	GMHBA Stadium	H	20,533	12th

=== Ladder ===
Pos	Team	Pld	W	L	D	PF	PA	PP	Pts	Qualification
1	Collingwood (P)	23	18	5	0	2142	1687	127.0	72	Finals series
2	Brisbane Lions	23	17	6	0	2180	1771	123.1	68	Finals series
3	Port Adelaide	23	17	6	0	2149	1906	112.7	68	Finals series
4	Melbourne	23	16	7	0	2079	1660	125.2	64	Finals series
5	Carlton	23	13	9	1	1922	1697	113.3	54	Finals series
6	St Kilda	23	13	10	0	1775	1647	107.8	52	Finals series
7	Greater Western Sydney	23	13	10	0	2018	1885	107.1	52	Finals series
8	Sydney	23	12	10	1	2050	1863	110.0	50	Finals series
9	Western Bulldogs	23	12	11	0	1919	1766	108.7	48	
10	Adelaide	23	11	12	0	2193	1877	116.8	44	
11	Essendon	23	11	12	0	1838	2050	89.7	44	
12	Geelong	23	10	12	1	2088	1855	112.6	42	
13	Richmond	23	10	12	1	1856	1983	93.6	42	
14	Fremantle	23	10	13	0	1835	1898	96.7	40	
15	Gold Coast	23	9	14	0	1839	2006	91.7	36	
16	Hawthorn	23	7	16	0	1686	2101	80.2	28	
17	North Melbourne	23	3	20	0	1657	2318	71.5	12	
18	West Coast	23	3	20	0	1418	2674	53.0	12	

Source: afl.com.au
Rules for classification: 1) points; 2) percentage; 3) number of points for
(P) Premiers

=== Awards ===
==== League awards ====
- Tom Wills Award: Tom Hawkins (Round 7 vs Essendon)
- AFLPA 22 Under 22 team: Sam De Koning (Defence)
- All-Australian: Tom Stewart

==== Club Awards ====
- Carji Greeves Medal: Tom Stewart (135 votes)
- Best Young Player Award: Ollie Henry
- Tom Harley Best Clubman: Tom Atkins
- Carter Family Community Champion Award: Tom Stewart

== VFL team ==
Geelong Football Club
2023 VFL season
- President: Craig Drummond
- Coach: Mark Corrigan (1st season)
- Captains: Angus Byrne (1st season)
- Home ground: GMHBA Stadium
- VFL: 8 wins, 9 losses, 1 draw (13th)
- Best and Fairest: Jye Chalcraft

=== Season summary ===
Casey 2022 VFL premiers coach Mark Corrigan was appointed as coach of Geelong's VFL team in October 2022, replacing Shane O'Bree who had been promoted to the club's AFL program. Corrigan had previously played with the club from 2011 to 2014 and was a member of the club's 2012 VFL premiership team. Angus Byrne was appointed as captain, with Tom Feely and Daniel Capiron as vice-captains.

Jye Chalcraft would win his second successive Geelong VFL best and fairest award, polling 163 votes after appearing in all 18 matches. Vice-captain Daniel Capiron would finish in second place, with Ted Clohesy rounding out the top three placegetters.

=== Results ===
Key
H	Home game
A	Away game

Table of season results
Round	Date	Result	Score			Opponent	Score			Ground	
Round	Date	Result	G	B	T	Opponent	G	B	T	Ground	
1	24 March	Won	12	13	85	Carlton	10	9	69	Princes Park	A
2	2 April	Lost	11	9	75	Gold Coast	28	14	182	Heritage Bank Stadium	A
3	10 April	Lost	7	10	52	Box Hill	16	11	107	Melbourne Cricket Ground	H
4	15 April	Won	9	6	60	Werribee	5	17	47	Avalon Airport Oval	A
5	Bye										
6	30 April	Won	6	20	56	Coburg	7	6	48	Piranha Park	A
7	7 May	Lost	10	4	64	Southport	16	12	108	GMHBA Stadium	H
8	13 May	Draw	10	15	75	Richmond	11	6	75	Swinburne Centre	A
9	Bye										
10	28 May	Won	10	13	73	Port Melbourne	8	12	60	GMHBA Stadium	H
11	3 June	Lost	7	8	50	Footscray	15	18	108	Avalon Airport Oval	A
12	Bye										
13	16 June	Won	10	12	72	Frankston	11	4	70	GMHBA Stadium	H
14	23 June	Lost	5	10	40	Casey	11	14	80	GMHBA Stadium	H
15	30 June	Won	12	5	77	Sydney	10	6	69	SCG	A
16	9 July	Lost	9	4	58	North Melbourne	15	11	101	GMHBA Stadium	H
17	16 July	Lost	7	12	54	Essendon	9	10	64	GMHBA Stadium	H
18	22 July	Lost	12	5	77	Brisbane	17	10	112	Brighton Homes Arena	A
19	30 July	Won	19	18	132	Northern Bullants	6	6	42	GMHBA Stadium	H
20	Bye										
21	12 August	Lost	8	7	55	Collingwood	20	9	129	Victoria Park	A
22	19 August	Won	14	8	92	Greater Western Sydney	11	12	78	GMHBA Stadium	H

=== Ladder ===
Pos	Team	Pld	W	L	D	PF	PA	PP	Pts
11	Carlton (R)	18	10	8	0	1412	1326	106.5	40
12	Greater Western Sydney (R)	18	9	9	0	1454	1658	87.7	36
13	Geelong (R)	18	8	9	1	1247	1549	80.5	34
14	Southport	18	8	10	0	1494	1384	107.9	32
15	Port Melbourne	18	6	12	0	1270	1512	84.0	24

Source: afl.com.au
Rules for classification: 1) points; 2) percentage; 3) number of points for
(R) = Reserves

=== Awards ===
- VFL Team of the Year: Oliver Dempsey (forward)

==== Club Awards ====
- Best and Fairest: Jye Chalcraft (163 votes)
- Little Vic Award (Best first year player): Mace Cousins

== AFL Women's team ==
Geelong Football Club
2023 AFL Women's season
- President: Craig Drummond
- Coach: Daniel Lowther (3rd season)
- Captains: Meg McDonald (4th season)
- Home ground: GMHBA Stadium
- AFLW season: 6 wins, 4 losses (6th)
- Finals series: Lost Preliminary Final
- Best and Fairest: Georgie Prespakis
- Leading goalkicker: Chloe Scheer (20)
- Highest home attendance: 6,678 vs. Essendon (Elimination final)
- Lowest home attendance: 2,166 vs. Fremantle (Round 7)
- Average home attendance: 4,021
- Club membership: 7,190

=== Season summary ===
Meg McDonald was reappointed captain ahead of the season, as part of a five-woman leadership group. Nina Morrison was re-elected as vice-captain, with Chantel Emonson, Becky Webster and Mikayla Bowen the other members of the leadership group.

The team would have its best season in the competition, qualifying for the final series for the second consecutive season. In the finals, Geelong would win their first AFLW finals matches, defeating Essendon and reigning premiers Melbourne to progress to a preliminary final against Brisbane. In a controversially umpired match, Brisbane would eliminate Geelong one match short of the 2023 AFL Women's Grand Final, winning by four points.

Despite their high ladder position, Geelong would only have two players shortlisted for the 2023 AFL Women's All-Australian team, with both Georgie Prespakis and Amy McDonald both surprising omissions from the final squad announcement. Both players would feature in the top 10 in the count for the 2023 AFL Women's best and fairest medal behind eventual winner Monique Conti of Richmond. McDonald finishing in a tie for second place, with Prespakis finishing tied for seventh.

Irish import Aisling Moloney would be recognised at the 2023 AFL Players Association awards, winning the best first year player award after excelling in her first year playing the sport.

=== Preseason ===
In the club's first official action before the start of the new season, Geelong defeated Collingwood by 13 points in a four-quarter match simulation at Victoria Park on 12 August. The Cats then played Adelaide in their only official practice match, losing a tight contest 7.8 (50) to 8.8 (56) at the Adelaide Oval. Kate Darby kicked two goals in the match, with Irish recruit Aishling Moloney impressing.

=== Coaching staff ===
Daniel Lowther continued as head coach of the AFLW program for a third season. Former Geelong VFL Women's coach Andrew Bruce (forwards), Josh Finch (midfield), and 2023 Geelong VFL Women's coach Elise Coventry (defence) were appointed as assistant coaches. Current men's team player Gary Rohan, and former Geelong VFL player Will Sexton, joined the coaching staff as development coaches.

=== Playing list ===
==== Changes ====
Deletions from playing list
Player	Reason	Ref.
Maddy McMahon	Retired	
Georgia Clarke	Delisted^{[a]}	
Kalani Scoullar	Delisted	
Maddy Keryk	Traded to Port Adelaide	
Laura Gardiner	Traded to Sydney	

Additions to playing list
Player	Acquired	Ref.
Kate Surman	Traded from Port Adelaide	
Aishling Moloney	International rookie selection from Tipperary GAA	
Anna-Rose Kennedy	International rookie selection from Tipperary GAA	
Erin Hoare	No. 1, 2023 supplementary draft	

- ^{a} Georgia Clarke was subsequently signed by Essendon during the 2023 free agency period.

==== Statistics ====
Updated to end of season

Key
#	Denotes player who was on the club's rookie list.
^	Denotes player who was on the club's inactive list.

Playing list and statistics
Player	No.	Games	Goals	Behinds	Kicks	Handballs	Disposals	Marks	Tackles	Hitouts	Milestone(s)
Mikayla Bowen	1	13	2	1	92	71	163	35	56	0	—N/a
Annabel Johnson	2	1	0	0	10	1	11	3	1	0	—N/a
Amy McDonald	3	13	5	1	133	162	295	28	94	0	—N/a
Darcy Moloney	4	13	3	6	95	90	185	24	64	0	—N/a
Jacqueline Parry	5	13	16	11	101	43	144	56	23	20	—N/a
Julia Crockett-Grills	6	12	3	3	81	52	133	28	55	0	50th AFLW match (round 8)
Kate Surman	7	13	4	5	76	56	132	25	49	0	Club debut (round 1)
Kate Darby	8	12	2	2	53	23	76	28	36	137	—N/a
Nina Morrison	9	13	6	5	150	148	298	30	67	0	—N/a
Georgie Rankin	10	12	0	0	47	41	88	22	34	0	—N/a
Meg McDonald	11	13	0	0	80	45	125	42	21	0	50th AFLW match (round 4); 50th club match (round 8)
Renee Garing	12	10	1	0	34	55	89	9	69	0	—N/a
Olivia Fuller	13	2	0	0	3	6	9	2	3	21	—N/a
Chloe Scheer	14	12	20	7	49	25	74	24	21	0	50th AFLW goal (round 10)
Shelley Scott	15	7	3	3	30	19	49	17	21	1	—N/a
Chantel Emonson	16	13	0	0	147	44	191	31	43	0	50th AFLW match (round 7)
Anna-Rose Kennedy#	18	1	0	0	0	0	0	0	2	0	AFLW debut (preliminary final)
Brooke Plummer	19	1	0	0	7	3	10	1	1	0	—N/a
Zali Friswell	20	12	1	1	51	77	128	19	43	0	—N/a
Rebecca Webster	21	10	2	3	104	75	179	27	21	0	50th AFLW match (preliminary final)
Rachel Kearns	22	11	1	1	60	25	85	17	17	0	—N/a
Samantha Gooden^	23	0	—N/a	—N/a	—N/a	—N/a	—N/a	—N/a	—N/a	—N/a	—N/a
Mia Skinner	25	0	—N/a	—N/a	—N/a	—N/a	—N/a	—N/a	—N/a	—N/a	—N/a
Claudia Gunjaca	26	13	0	0	99	41	140	51	19	0	—N/a
Ingrid Houtsma	31	0	—N/a	—N/a	—N/a	—N/a	—N/a	—N/a	—N/a	—N/a	—N/a
Gabbie Featherston	32	4	0	0	7	8	15	3	6	0	—N/a
Abbey McDonald	39	4	0	0	16	5	21	6	8	0	AFLW debut (round 1)
Georgie Prespakis	41	13	4	7	183	132	315	17	93	0	—N/a
Melissa Bragg	44	7	0	1	11	19	30	2	8	5	—N/a
Aishling Moloney#	45	13	10	15	98	39	137	43	19	1	AFLW debut (round 1)
Erin Hoare	46	12	0	0	15	56	71	7	19	250	—N/a

=== Results ===
Key
H	Home game
A	Away game
EF	Elimination final
SF	Semi-final
PF	Preliminary final

Table of season results
Round	Date	Result	Score			Opponent	Score			Ground		Attendance	Ladder
Round	Date	Result	G	B	T	Opponent	G	B	T	Ground		Attendance	Ladder
1	2 September	Won	10	5	65	Western Bulldogs	2	5	17	GMHBA Stadium	H	4,404	1st
2	9 September	Won	10	8	68	Sydney	5	11	41	North Sydney Oval	A	2,878	4th
3	15 September	Lost	3	4	22	North Melbourne	4	7	31	GMHBA Stadium	H	2,907	6th
4	23 September	Won	11	4	72	Port Adelaide	5	12	42	Alberton Oval	A	2,132	5th
5	28 September	Lost	4	1	25	Melbourne	11	8	74	GMHBA Stadium	H	4,312	6th
6	8 October	Lost	2	7	19	Essendon	4	5	29	Reid Oval, Warrnambool	A	2,832	8th
7	14 October	Won	6	11	47	Fremantle	3	5	23	GMHBA Stadium	H	2,166	6th
8	22 October	Lost	3	6	24	Collingwood	4	6	30	Victoria Park	A	2,527	8th
9	28 October	Won	6	13	49	Richmond	1	5	11	Ikon Park	A	2,021	7th
10	4 November	Won	9	6	20	Hawthorn	3	2	20	GMHBA Stadium	H	3,658	6th
EF	12 November	Won	7	9	51	Essendon	5	3	33	GMHBA Stadium	H	6,678	—N/a
SF	19 November	Won	7	8	50	Melbourne	6	9	45	Ikon Park	N	5,057	—N/a
PF	25 November	Lost	5	4	34	Brisbane	6	2	38	Brighton Homes Arena	A	4,903	—N/a

=== Ladder ===
Pos	Team	Pld	W	L	D	PF	PA	PP	Pts	Qualification
1	Adelaide	10	9	1	0	599	314	190.8	36	Finals series
2	Melbourne	10	8	2	0	653	293	222.9	32	Finals series
3	North Melbourne	10	7	3	0	478	213	224.4	28	Finals series
4	Brisbane (P)	10	7	3	0	505	339	149.0	28	Finals series
5	Gold Coast	10	6	3	1	416	351	118.5	26	Finals series
6	Geelong	10	6	4	0	449	318	141.2	24	Finals series
7	Essendon	10	6	4	0	379	354	107.1	24	Finals series
8	Sydney	10	6	4	0	462	432	106.9	24	Finals series
9	St Kilda	10	6	4	0	408	399	102.3	24	
10	Richmond	10	5	5	0	382	379	100.8	20	
11	Collingwood	10	5	5	0	331	399	83.0	20	
12	Carlton	10	4	6	0	361	420	86.0	16	
13	Fremantle	10	4	6	0	289	402	71.9	16	
14	Hawthorn	10	3	7	0	307	456	67.3	12	
15	Port Adelaide	10	2	7	1	404	538	75.1	10	
16	Greater Western Sydney	10	2	8	0	316	596	53.0	8	
17	West Coast	10	2	8	0	269	530	50.8	8	
18	Western Bulldogs	10	1	9	0	320	595	53.8	4	

Source: afl.com.au
Rules for classification: 1) points; 2) percentage; 3) number of points for
(P) Premiers

=== Awards ===
==== League awards ====
- Rising Star: Zali Friswell (nominated, round 10)
- AFLPA 22under22 squad: Georgie Prespakis, Nina Morrison (midfield)
- AFLPA Best First Year Player: Aishling Moloney

==== Club Awards ====
- Best and fairest: Georgie Prespakis (188 votes)
- Geelong AFLW Fan MVP: Georgie Prespakis
- The 'Hoops' Award: Renee Garing
- Community Champion: Kate Darby

== VFLW team ==
Geelong Football Club
2023 VFL Women's season
- President: Craig Drummond
- Coach: Elise Coventry (1st season)
- Captains: Chloe Leonard (1st season)
- Home grounds: Deakin University Elite Sports Precinct, Waurn Ponds
- VFLW: 7 wins, 1 draw, 6 losses (8th)
- Best and Fairest: Charlotte Simpson
- Leading goalkicker: Olivia Cicolini (11)

=== Season summary ===
Former Geelong player Elise Coventry was appointed as the club's VFL Women's coach in December 2022, replacing Andrew Bruce. Coventry was joined by assistant coaches Anna Teague, Alf Della Monica and Aiden Yelland.

Chloe Leonard was appointed captain, after serving as vice-captain in 2022. Poppy Schaap, Abby Favell, Sachi DeGiacomi, and former captain Bree Beckley were the rest of the team's leadership group.

After losing to North Melbourne in round 1, Geelong went on a five game winning streak, including turning the tables on North Melbourne in round 6, with a last second goal to Olivia Cicolini to secure a 28–22 win.

Analea McKee and Charlotte Simpson were both selected in an invitational Under-23 All-Stars squad for a match against the AFLW Academy at Marvel Stadium during round 12 of the season.

The team would sit a game clear atop the competition ladder after round 9, but would endure a five-match winless streak to eventually miss the finals, finishing eighth.

=== Results ===
Key
H	Home game
A	Away game

Table of season results
Round	Date	Result	Score			Opponent	Score			Ground	
Round	Date	Result	G	B	T	Opponent	G	B	T	Ground	
1	25 March	Lost	3	2	20	North Melbourne	4	5	29	Deakin University Elite Sports Precinct	H
2	1 April	Won	3	4	22	Carlton	2	9	21	Ikon Park	A
3	8 April	Won	12	6	78	Darebin	0	2	2	Deakin University Elite Sports Precinct	H
4	16 April	Won	2	5	17	Southern Saints	1	1	7	Trevor Barker Beach Oval	A
5	22 April	Won	6	7	43	Western Bulldogs	2	3	15	Deakin University Elite Sports Precinct	H
6	29 April	Won	3	10	28	North Melbourne	3	4	22	Arden Street Oval	A
7	6 May	Lost	4	3	27	Collingwood	4	6	30	Deakin University Elite Sports Precinct	H
8	14 May	Won	4	9	33	Darebin	0	4	4	La Trobe University, Bundoora	A
9	20 May	Won	4	4	28	Essendon	4	2	26	NEC Hangar	A
10	27 May	Lost	3	7	25	Port Melbourne	5	2	32	Deakin University Elite Sports Precinct	H
11	3 June	Lost	2	2	14	Casey	4	11	35	Deakin University Elite Sports Precinct	H
12	17 June	Draw	4	3	27	Box Hill	3	9	27	Deakin University Elite Sports Precinct	H
13	25 June	Lost	0	3	3	Collingwood	5	13	43	Olympic Park Oval	A
14	1 July	Lost	5	7	37	Williamstown	8	3	51	DSV Stadium	A

=== Ladder ===
Pos	Team	Pld	W	L	D	PF	PA	PP	Pts	Qualification
6	Carlton	14	8	6	0	526	349	150.7	32	Finals series
7	Southern Saints	14	8	6	0	365	334	109.3	32	
8	Geelong Cats	14	7	6	1	402	344	116.9	30	
9	North Melbourne	14	7	7	0	410	427	96.0	28	
10	Casey	14	6	8	0	505	473	106.8	24	

Source: AFL.com.au
Rules for classification: 1) points; 2) percentage; 3) number of points for.

=== Awards ===
- Lambert–Pearce Medal: Charlotte Simpson (14 votes)
- Debbie Lee Medal (VFLW Rising Star): Charlotte Simpson
- VFL Women's Team of the Year: Charlotte Simpson (midfield)

==== Club Awards ====
- Best and Fairest: Charlotte Simpson (72 votes)
