= 2022 AFL Women's All-Australian team =

2022 AFL Women's All-Australian team may refer to:

- 2022 AFL Women's season 6 All-Australian team, for the season that took place from January to April
- 2022 AFL Women's season 7 All-Australian team, for the season that took place from August to November
