= 2022 AFL Women's season 7 All-Australian team =

- Date: 22 November 2022
- Venue: Crown Melbourne
- Hosted by: Sarah Jones

Television/radio coverage
- Network: Fox Footy

The 2022 AFL Women's season 7 All-Australian team represents the best-performed players of 2022 AFL Women's season 7. The team was announced on 22 November 2022 as a complete women's Australian rules football team of 21 players. The team is honorary and does not play any games.

== Selection panel ==
The selection panel for the AFL Women's season seven All-Australian team consisted of chairwoman Nicole Livingstone, Sarah Black, Sam Virgo, Andrew Dillon, Laura Kane, Kelli Underwood, Megan Waters, Narelle Smith and Tim Harrington.

== Initial squad ==
The initial 42-woman All-Australian squad was announced on 8 November 2022. Minor premiers Brisbane had the most players selected in the initial squad with six. Expansion teams Hawthorn, Port Adelaide and Sydney were the only clubs to not have any players named.

| **Bold** | Named in the final team |

| Club | Total | Player(s) |
|---|---|---|
| Adelaide | 4 | **Chelsea Biddell**, **Anne Hatchard**, **Ebony Marinoff**, **Chelsea Randall** |
| Brisbane | 6 | Ally Anderson, **Greta Bodey**, **Nat Grider**, Tahlia Hickie, **Breanna Koenen**, **Jesse Wardlaw** |
| Carlton | 2 | Vaomua Laloifi, **Breann Moody** |
| Collingwood | 3 | Jordyn Allen, Lauren Butler, Chloe Molloy |
| Essendon | 2 | **Maddy Prespakis**, Bonnie Toogood |
| Fremantle | 1 | Kiara Bowers |
| Geelong | 4 | **Amy McDonald**, Meg McDonald, **Georgie Prespakis**, **Chloe Scheer** |
| Gold Coast | 2 | Charlie Rowbottom, Vivien Saad |
| Greater Western Sydney | 1 | Alyce Parker |
| Hawthorn | 0 | |
| Melbourne | 4 | Tayla Harris, **Kate Hore**, Karen Paxman, **Olivia Purcell** |
| North Melbourne | 3 | Jenna Bruton, **Jasmine Garner**, **Emma Kearney** |
| Port Adelaide | 0 | |
| Richmond | 4 | **Monique Conti**, Ellie McKenzie, **Eilish Sheerin**, **Courtney Wakefield** |
| St Kilda | 2 | Bianca Jakobsson, Kate Shierlaw |
| Sydney | 0 | |
| West Coast | 1 | Emma Swanson |
| Western Bulldogs | 3 | Ellie Blackburn, Alice Edmonds, **Katie Lynch** |

== Final team ==
The final team was announced on 22 November 2022. Adelaide and Brisbane had the most selections with four each, with nine teams represented overall. Ten players achieved selection for the first time, while six players from the 2022 team were selected, with North Melbourne captain Emma Kearney achieving selection for the seventh consecutive year. North Melbourne midfielder Jasmine Garner was named as All-Australian captain, while Brisbane captain Breanna Koenen was named as vice-captain. Brisbane midfielder Ally Anderson, who won the 2022 AFL Women's season 7 best and fairest award, became the first AFLW player to win the league best and fairest award but miss All-Australian selection in the same season.

2022 AFL Women's season 7 All-Australian team
| B: | Chelsea Biddell (Adelaide) | Breanna Koenen (Brisbane) (vice-captain) | |
| HB: | Eilish Sheerin (Richmond) | Katie Lynch (Western Bulldogs) | Emma Kearney (North Melbourne) |
| C: | Anne Hatchard (Adelaide) | Monique Conti (Richmond) | Georgie Prespakis (Geelong) |
| HF: | Kate Hore (Melbourne) | Jesse Wardlaw (Brisbane) | Maddy Prespakis (Essendon) |
| F: | Courtney Wakefield (Richmond) | Chloe Scheer (Geelong) | |
| Foll: | Breann Moody (Carlton) | Jasmine Garner (North Melbourne) (captain) | Ebony Marinoff (Adelaide) |
| Int: | Olivia Purcell (Melbourne) | Nat Grider (Brisbane) | Amy McDonald (Geelong) |
| Int: | Chelsea Randall (Adelaide) | Greta Bodey (Brisbane) | |
| Coach: | Mick Stinear (Melbourne) | | |

Note: the position of coach in the AFL Women's All-Australian team is traditionally awarded to the coach of the premiership-winning team.
