= Jay Polkinghorne =

Australian rules football player with Geelong

Personal information
- Full name: Jay Polkinghorne
- Born: 2 June 2006 (age 20)
- Original team: Norwood Football Club (SANFL)
- Draft: No. 44, 2024 national draft
- Debut: Round 19, 2026, Geelong vs. St Kilda, at GHMBA Stadium
- Height: 191 cm (6 ft 3 in)
- Position: Key Forward

Club information
- Current club: Geelong
- Number: 2

Playing career^{1}
Years	Club	Games (Goals)
2025–	Geelong	8 (14)
- ^{1} Playing statistics correct to the end of 2026.

Jay Polkinghorne (born 2 June 2006) is an Australian rules footballer playing for Geelong in the Australian Football League (AFL). He was drafted with pick 44 in the 2024 national draft

== Junior career ==
Originally from a farm near Penong, on the edge of the Nullarbor Plain in western South Australia, Polkinghorne played for Western United in the West Eyre Football League. He then moved to Adelaide to play for Norwood. He was drafted by Geelong with the 44th selection in the 2024 AFL national draft.

== AFL career ==
After nearly two full seasons playing for Geelong's VFL side, Polkinghorne was picked to make his debut in Round 19 of the 2026 AFL season against St Kilda, following star forward Jeremy Cameron's absence from the team, having sustained a shoulder injury in the previous round. Polkinghorne accumulated 11 disposals and scored two goals and three behinds on debut, as well as scoring a goal with his first kick. Polkinghorne cemented his spot in Geelong's senior side until the end of their season, before going back to the VFL and playing in their VFL team's grand final loss against the Box Hill Hawks.

== Statistics ==
Updated to the end of the 2026 AFL season.

Legend
G	Goals	K	Kicks	D	Disposals	T	Tackles
B	Behinds	H	Handballs	M	Marks

Season	Team	No.	Games	Totals							Averages (per game)							Votes
Season	Team	No.	Games	G	B	K	H	D	M	T	G	B	K	H	D	M	T	Votes
2025	Geelong	2	0	—	—	—	—	—	—	—	—	—	—	—	—	—	—	0
2026	Geelong	2	8	14	8	42	20	62	31	9	1.75	1	5.25	2.50	7.75	3.88	1.13	0
Career			8	14	8	42	20	62	31	9	1.75	1	5.25	2.50	7.75	3.88	1.13	0
