= James Rahilly =

Australian rules footballer and coach

Personal information
- Full name: James Rahilly
- Born: 15 June 1979 (age 47)
- Original team: Geelong Falcons
- Draft: 38th, 1997 AFL draft
- Height: 187 cm (6 ft 2 in)
- Weight: 84 kg (185 lb)

Playing career^{1}
Years	Club	Games (Goals)
1998–2005	Geelong	90 (11)
- ^{1} Playing statistics correct to the end of 2005.

Career highlights
- AFL Rising Star nominee: 1998; Norm Goss Medal: 2002; VFL premiership player: 2002; AFLCA Assistant Coach of the Year: 2023

James Rahilly (born 15 June 1979) is a former Australian rules footballer who played with Geelong in the Australian Football League (AFL). He is currently serving as an assistant coach with the Geelong Football Club.

== Early life and junior football ==
Rahilly played his early football at South Warrnambool but was recruited from the Geelong Falcons in the TAC Cup.

== Playing career ==
A defender, he received a 1998 AFL Rising Star nomination in his sixth league game, against Carlton at the MCG, where he had 22 disposals. Although Geelong made it into the final in three of the seasons he was at the club, Rahilly was never selected for a finals game. Rahilly was, however, a member of the Geelong reserves team which won the 2002 Victorian Football League (VFL) premiership and was awarded the Norm Goss Memorial Medal for his efforts in the grand final. He also won Geelong's "Best Clubman" award, in 2003.

== Coaching career ==
He returned to the VFL in 2008 as an assistant coach and was then appointed to Chris Scott's senior coaching staff for the 2011 AFL season.

At the end of 2020 James was appointed as Adelaide's forward line coach, assistant coach to Matthew Nicks for season 2021.

At the end of 2023 Rahilly returned to Geelong as their forward line coach.
