= Georgie Prespakis =

Australian rules footballer

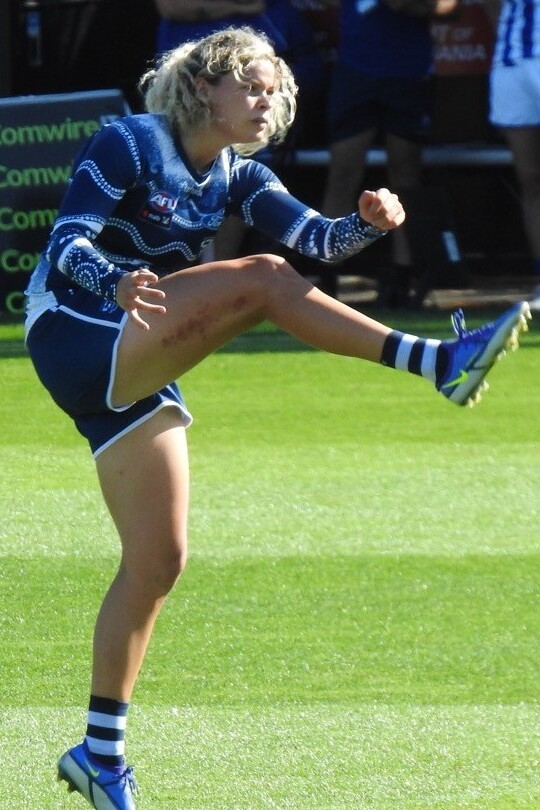
- Prespakis playing for Geelong in 2022

Personal information
- Full name: Georgie Prespakis
- Born: 13 March 2003 (age 23)
- Original team: Calder Cannons/Essendon (VFLW)
- Draft: No. 2, 2021 national draft
- Debut: Round 1, 2022 (S6), Geelong vs. North Melbourne, at Arden Street Oval
- Height: 168 cm (5 ft 6 in)
- Position: Midfielder

Club information
- Current club: Geelong
- Number: 41

Playing career^{1}
Years	Club	Games (Goals)
2022 (S6)–	Geelong	53 (12)
- ^{1} Playing statistics correct to the end of end 2025 season.

Career highlights
- 2× AFL Women's All-Australian team: 2022 (S7), 2025; 2× Geelong best and fairest: 2023, 2025

Georgie Prespakis (born 13 March 2003) is an Australian rules footballer playing for Geelong Football Club in the AFL Women's (AFLW). Prespakis was selected in the 2022 AFL Women's season 7 All-Australian team and has won the Geelong best and fairest award in 2023 and 2025.

== Early life ==
Prespakis is the daughter of Damien and Jody. Her mother is an Indigenous Australian from the Djadjawurrung tribe. Prespakis has three siblings: twins Annalea and Maddy, and Jimmy. Older sister Madison currently plays for Essendon.

She played junior football with the boys in Romsey, crossing to Sunbury to play in the under-18 girls' competition. Picked up by the Calder Cannons development program, she took out the competition's best and fairest in 2019. Prespakis won her second best and fairest award in 2021, scoring seven best-on-ground votes in just nine appearances for the Cannons.

Prespakis finished the 2021 season playing with Essendon in the VFL Women's competition, playing five matches (including three finals), her last game coming against Geelong Cats at Windy Hill.

== AFL Women's career ==
Geelong recruited Prespakis with their first selection and second overall in the 2021 AFL Women's draft. She made her AFL Women's debut in the opening round of 2022 season 6 against North Melbourne at Arden Street Oval, a game in which she was nominated for the 2022 AFL Women's season 6 Rising Star award. In March, Prespakis was included in the 40-player squad for the AFL Players Association 22under22 team, and was named on the wing in the final 22under22 team.

In round 1 of 2022 AFL Women's season 7, Prespakis kicked Geelong's only two goals, including one in the last minute to score a 15–11 victory over Richmond at GMHBA Stadium.

At the AFL Women's awards following the conclusion of 2022 AFL Women's season 7, Prespakis was again named to the wing in the AFL Players Association 22 Under 22 team, as well as receiving her first AFL Women's All-Australian team selection. Prespakis was also a top-10 finisher in the 2022 AFL Women's season 7 best and fairest, but she would have been ineligible to win the award after being suspended by the AFL Tribunal during the home-and-away season.

At the Geelong best and fairest awards for 2022 season 7, Prespakis finished runner-up behind three-time winner Amy McDonald, only four points behind in her second season. She was voted the Cats Fans MVP and won a new award named the Grit award, where "Cats players voted each week on who they believed showed the most 'grit' during games, throughout acts such as tackles, smothers, intercepts, gut running and pressure acts."

In the first game of the 2023 season, Prespakis kicked a goal that was wrongly adjudged by the goal umpire as a behind.

Prespakis won the 2023 Geelong Cats AFLW Best and Fairest award and followed up with a third place finish in 2024.

In 2025, Prespakis had a career-best season, averaging 25.8 disposals per game and scored 4 goals, leading to her winning her 2nd Geelong Cats AFLW Best and Fairest award. She was also included in the league All-Australian team for the 2nd time, while also finishing runner-up to winner Ash Riddell in the league Best and Fairest.

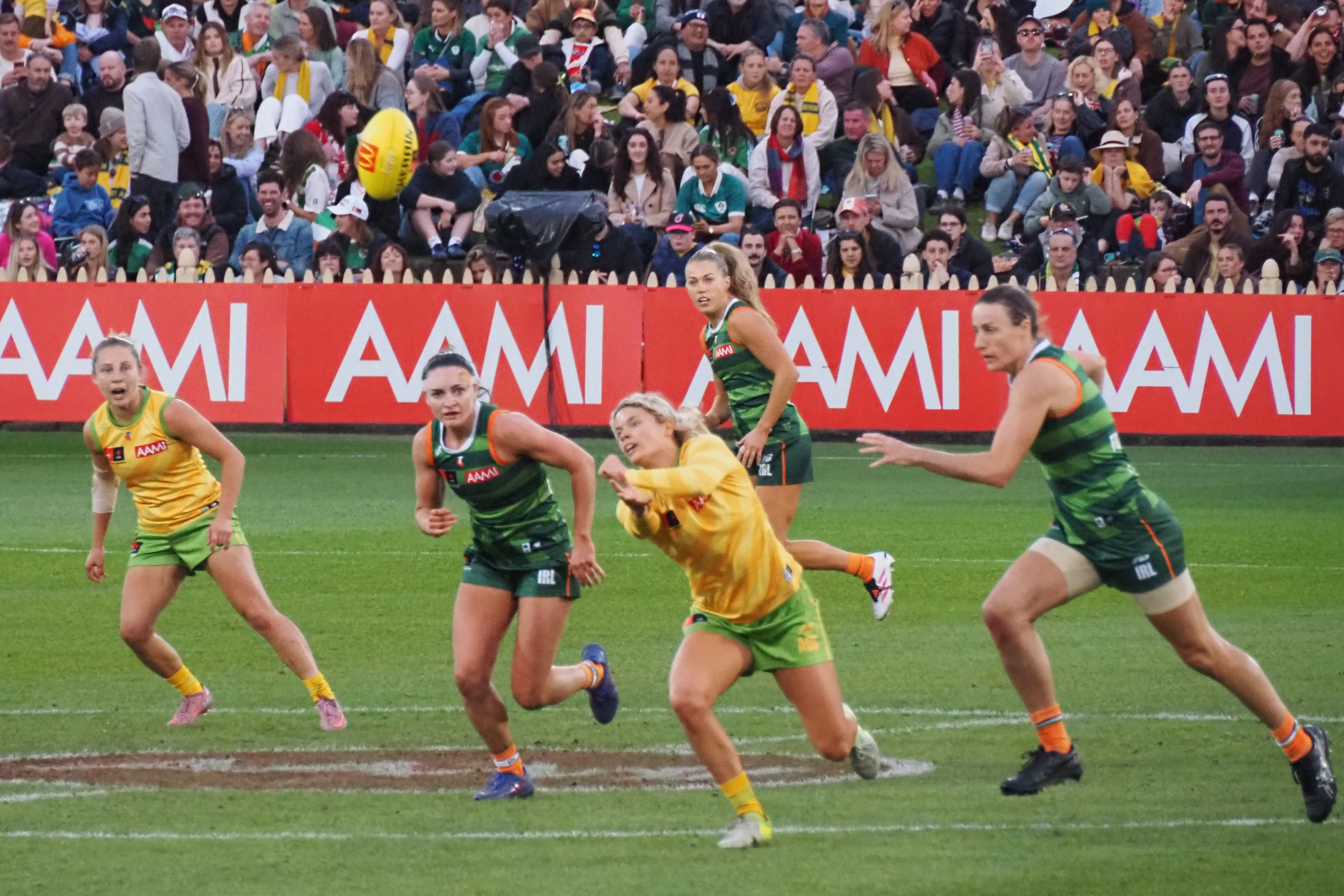
Prespakis represented Australia in 2026

== Statistics ==
Statistics are correct to the end of the 2025 AFL Women's season.

Season	Team	No.	Games	Totals							Averages (per game)							Votes
Season	Team	No.	Games	G	B	K	H	D	M	T	G	B	K	H	D	M	T	Votes
2022 (S6)	Geelong	41	10	0	2	70	63	133	6	68	0.0	0.2	7.0	6.3	13.3	0.6	6.8	1
2022 (S7)	Geelong	41	9	2	2	105	91	196	17	65	0.2	0.2	11.7	10.1	21.8	1.9	7.2	15
2023	Geelong	41	13	4	7	183	132	315	17	93	0.3	0.5	14.1	10.2	24.2	1.3	7.2	14
2024	Geelong	41	9	2	5	91	91	182	6	51	0.2	0.6	10.1	10.1	20.2	0.7	5.7	6
2025	Geelong	41	12	4	6	174	136	310	24	71	0.3	0.5	14.5	11.3	25.8	2.0	5.9	20
Career			53	12	22	623	513	1136	70	348	0.2	0.4	11.8	9.7	21.4	1.3	6.6	56
