= Julia Crockett-Grills =

Australian rules footballer

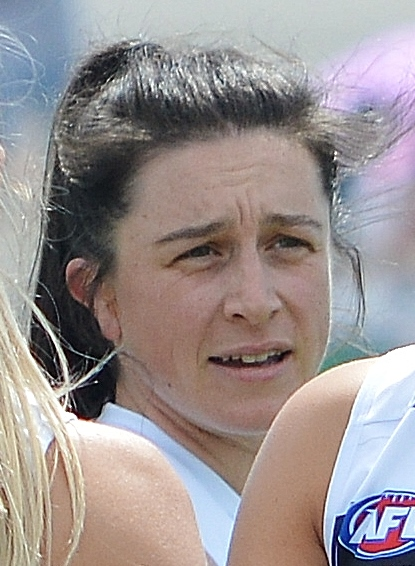
- Crockett-Grills with Geelong in February 2020

Personal information
- Born: 28 October 1994 (age 32)
- Debut: Round 1, 2019, Geelong vs. Collingwood, at GMHBA Stadium
- Height: 166 cm (5 ft 5 in)

Club information
- Current club: Geelong
- Number: 6

Playing career^{1}
Years	Club	Games (Goals)
2019–	Geelong	55 (10)
- ^{1} Playing statistics correct to the end of the 2023 season.

Julia Crockett-Grills (born 28 October 1994) is an Australian rules footballer with the Geelong Football Club in the AFL Women's (AFLW).

Crockett-Grills grew up in Kyabram, Victoria and played football as a child before leaving the sport due to the absence of women's teams. When she was older, and living in Melbourne, she returned to playing local football with Scoresby and Knox.

Crockett-Grills was recruited directly by Geelong from the VFL Women's league, where she played with the Box Hill Hawks, prior to the club's inaugural season in the AFLW. She made her AFLW debut during the first round of the 2019 season, against Collingwood at GMHBA Stadium.
