= Ted Clohesy =

Personal information
- Born: 6 September 2004 (age 22)
- Original team: St Josephs/Geelong Falcons
- Draft: Category B rookie signing, 2022 National draft, Geelong
- Debut: Round 24, 2023, Geelong vs. Western Bulldogs, at Kardinia Park
- Height: 184 cm (6 ft 0 in)
- Position: Midfielder

Playing career
Years	Club	Games (Goals)
2023–2025	Geelong	12 (2)

Ted Clohesy (born 6 September 2004) is a former professional Australian rules footballer who played for the Geelong Football Club in the Australian Football League (AFL).

== Junior career ==
Clohesy played for the Geelong Falcons in the Talent League. He averaged 23.5 disposals in his draft year.

== AFL career ==
Clohesy was selected by Geelong as a category B rookie through their Next Generation Academy, being of South African descent. He made his debut in round 24 of the 2023 AFL season.

Clohesy was delisted by Geelong following the end of the 2025 AFL season.

== Personal life ==
Clohesy's older brother, Sam, is a professional Australian rules footballer with the Gold Coast Suns.

== Statistics ==
Legend
G	Goals	K	Kicks	D	Disposals	T	Tackles
B	Behinds	H	Handballs	M	Marks

Season	Team	No.	Games	Totals							Averages (per game)							Votes
Season	Team	No.	Games	G	B	K	H	D	M	T	G	B	K	H	D	M	T	Votes
2023	Geelong	40	1	0	0	1	4	5	1	1	0.0	0.0	1.0	4.0	5.0	1.0	1.0	0
2024	Geelong	40	2	0	1	6	4	10	3	8	0.0	0.5	3.0	2.0	5.0	1.5	4.0	0
2025	Geelong	40	9	2	3	48	23	71	16	22	0.2	0.3	5.3	2.6	7.9	1.8	2.4	0
Career			12	2	4	55	31	86	20	31	0.2	0.3	4.6	2.6	7.2	1.7	2.6	0
