= Geelong best and fairest (AFL Women's) =

- Awarded for: The best and fairest player of the Geelong Football Club in the AFL Women's
- Country: Australia
- Presented by: Geelong Football Club
- First award: 2019
- Currently held by: Georgie Prespakis

In the AFL Women's (AFLW), the Geelong best and fairest award is awarded to the best and fairest player at the Geelong Football Club during the home-and-away season. The award has been awarded annually since the club's inaugural season in the competition in 2019, with Meg McDonald the inaugural winner of the award.

== Recipients ==
**Bold**	Denotes current player
	Player won AFL Women's best and fairest in same season

Season	Recipient(s)	Ref.
2019	Meg McDonald	
2020	Olivia Purcell	
2021	**Amy McDonald**	
2022 (S6)	**Amy McDonald** (2)	
2022 (S7)	**Amy McDonald** (3)	
2023	**Georgie Prespakis**	
2024	**Nina Morrison**	
2025	**Georgie Prespakis** (2)	

== See also ==
- Carji Greeves Medal (list of Geelong Football Club best and fairest winners in the Australian Football League)
