= Toby Conway =

Australian rules footballer (born 2003)

Personal information
- Full name: Toby Conway
- Born: 24 April 2003 (age 23)
- Original team: Geelong Falcons / Geelong College
- Draft: No. 24, 2021 national draft
- Debut: Round 24, 2023, Geelong vs. Western Bulldogs
- Height: 206 cm (6 ft 9 in)
- Weight: 85 kg (187 lb)
- Position: Ruck

Club information
- Current club: Geelong
- Number: 6

Playing career^{1}
Years	Club	Games (Goals)
2023–	Geelong	6 (1)
- ^{1} Playing statistics correct to the end of 2024.

Toby Conway (born 24 April 2003) is an Australian rules footballer who plays for Geelong in the Australian Football League (AFL).

Geelong selected Conway with pick 24 in the 2021 AFL draft. He made his AFL debut in round 24 of the 2023 AFL season against the Western Bulldogs.

== AFL career ==
Conway made his debut in Round 24 of the 2023 AFL season, Conway continued his rise throughout the 2024 AFL season, playing 5 games and kicking 1 goal.
