= Amy McDonald (Australian footballer) =

Australian rules footballer

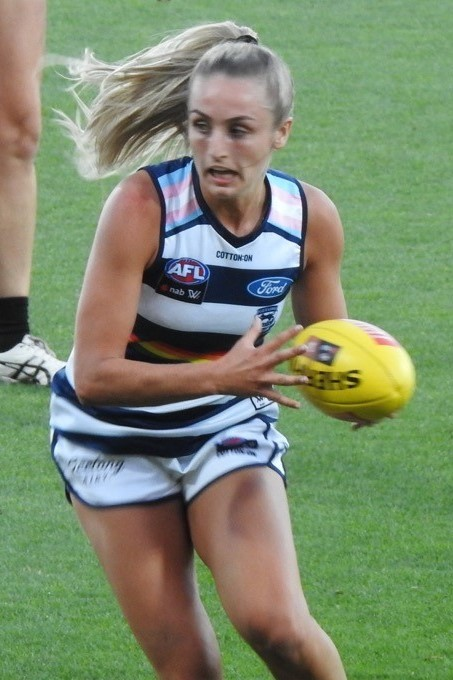
- McDonald playing for Geelong in 2022

Personal information
- Full name: Amy McDonald
- Born: 7 February 1998 (age 28)
- Original team: Geelong Cats (VFLW)
- Draft: No. 80, 2019 national draft
- Debut: Round 1, 2020, Geelong vs. Fremantle, at Fremantle Oval
- Height: 165 cm (5 ft 5 in)
- Position: Midfielder

Club information
- Current club: Geelong
- Number: 3

Playing career^{1}
Years	Club	Games (Goals)
2020–	Geelong	68 (9)
- ^{1} Playing statistics correct to the end of the 2025 season.

Career highlights
- AFL Women's All-Australian team: S7; 3× Geelong best and fairest: 2021, S6, S7

Amy McDonald (born 7 February 1998) is an Australian rules footballer playing for the Geelong Football Club in the AFL Women's (AFLW). McDonald is a three-time Geelong best and fairest winner and was named in the 2022 AFL Women's season 7 All-Australian team.

== Junior career ==
McDonald originally hails from Ballarat and played netball for Redan Football Netball Club, including an under 19s premiership in 2014 when she was just 15. A tap on the shoulder asking McDonald to fill a spot to ensure that the Youth Girls' team had enough numbers began her footballing career after taking a break from netball.

McDonald won her second Ballarat youth girls league best and fairest award in 2014. McDonald also spent time on the Greater Western Victoria Rebels list before playing with the Geelong Cats in the VFL Women's (VFLW) in 2019 where she managed 14 games and a team of the year selection after averaging just under 17 disposals and 5 tackles per game.

== AFL Women's career ==
McDonald was selected with pick 80 in the 2019 AFL Women's draft, Geelong's fifth pick of the draft. She was notified that she would be drafted after playing in a losing VFL Women's finals loss. McDonald made her AFL Women's debut in the opening round of the 2020 AFL Women's season against the Fremantle Dockers at Fremantle Oval in which the Geelong Cats lost. She had five disposals and two tackles on debut. Her side failed to make finals at the conclusion of the 2020 AFL Women's season and finished fifth on the conference A ladder.

McDonald was the winner of the Geelong best and fairest award in 2021, collecting 71 votes, almost double the vote tally of runner-up and inaugural winner Meg McDonald.

McDonald was Geelong's best player in its loss to North Melbourne in round 1 of the 2022 season, also polling six coaches' votes. She was Geelong's best player in its loss to Carlton in round 2 and among Geelong's best players in its losses to Collingwood in round 3 and Brisbane in round 4. McDonald was best afield in Geelong's first win of the season against West Coast in round 5; she polled seven coaches' votes and was selected in womens.afl's Team of the Week for that round. She was also among Geelong's best players in its losses to Gold Coast in round 6 and the Western Bulldogs in round 7, and was best afield in Geelong's win over Richmond in round 8; she polled the maximum ten coaches' votes and was selected in womens.afl's Team of the Week for round 8. McDonald was among Geelong's best players in its loss to St Kilda in round 9 and was Geelong's best player in its loss to Greater Western Sydney in round 10; she polled seven coaches' votes and was selected in womens.afl's Team of the Week for that round. She was named in Champion Data's 2022 AFLW All-Star stats team after leading the competition for groundballs with 10.9 a game and averaging the third-most contested possessions with 13.1 a game. McDonald won her second Geelong best and fairest award in 2022, collecting 116 votes, 13 ahead of runner-up Rebecca Webster.

Leading into the 2023 season, Sarah Black named McDonald at no. 8 on her annual list of the top 30 players in the AFLW.

In 2024, McDonald was named among Geelong's best players in losses to Melbourne in round 1 and Carlton in round 3, and was Geelong's best player in its draw against North Melbourne in round 2.

== Statistics ==
Updated to the end of the 2025 season.

Legend
G	Goals	K	Kicks	D	Disposals	T	Tackles
B	Behinds	H	Handballs	M	Marks
†	Led the league for the season

Season	Team	No.	Games	Totals							Averages (per game)							Votes
Season	Team	No.	Games	G	B	K	H	D	M	T	G	B	K	H	D	M	T	Votes
2020	Geelong	3	6	0	0	30	46	76	8	22	0.0	0.0	5.0	7.7	12.7	2.3	3.7	0
2021	Geelong	3	9	2	1	81	95	176	12	65	0.2	0.1	9.0	10.6	19.6	1.3	7.2	1
2022 (S6)	Geelong	3	10	0	2	85	125	210	5	81	0.0	0.2	8.5	12.5^{†}	21.0	0.5	8.1	8
2022 (S7)	Geelong	3	11	1	5	113	160^{†}	273	16	81	0.1	0.5	10.3	14.5^{†}	24.8^{†}	1.5	7.4	12
2023	Geelong	3	13	5	1	133	162	295	28	94	0.4	0.1	10.2	12.5	22.7	2.2	7.2	16
2024	Geelong	3	7	0	2	69	67	136	7	35	0.0	0.3	9.9	9.6	19.4	1.0	5.0	4
2025	Geelong	3	12	1	3	105	132	237	19	61	0.1	0.3	8.8	11.0	19.8	1.6	5.1	2
Career			68	9	13	616	787	1403	95	439	0.1	0.2	9.1	11.6	20.6	1.4	6.5	43

== Honours and achievements ==
- AFL Women's All-Australian team: S7
- 3× Geelong best and fairest: 2021, S6, S7
