= Meg McDonald (footballer) =

Australian rules footballer

Meghan McDonald
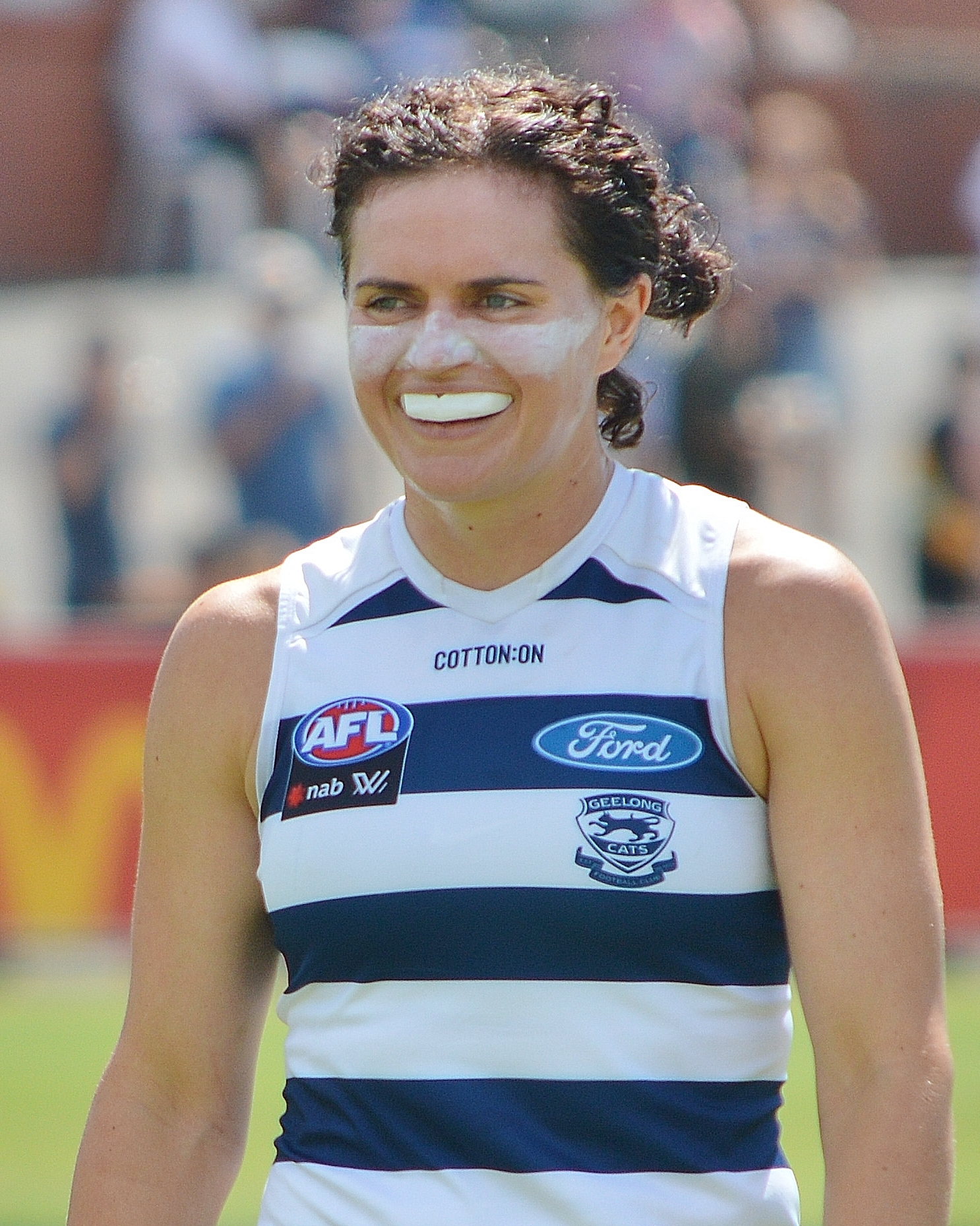
- McDonald with Geelong in February 2020

Personal information
- Full name: Meghan McDonald
- Born: 19 June 1991 (age 35)
- Original team: Darebin Falcons (VFL Women's)
- Draft: 2016 free agent: Western Bulldogs
- Debut: Round 4, 2017, Western Bulldogs vs. Collingwood, at VU Whitten Oval
- Height: 177 cm (5 ft 10 in)
- Position: Defender

Club information
- Current club: Geelong
- Number: 11

Playing career^{1}
Years	Club	Games (Goals)
2017	Western Bulldogs	4 (1)
2019–	Geelong	72 (1)
Total		76 (2)
- ^{1} Playing statistics correct to the end of the 2025 season.

Career highlights
- Geelong captain: 2021–; Geelong best and fairest: 2019

Meghan McDonald (born 29 June 1991) is an Australian rules footballer with the Geelong Football Club in the AFL Women's competition (AFLW). She previously played with the Western Bulldogs in the 2017 season. McDonald was recruited by the Western Bulldogs as a free agent in November 2016. She made her debut in the seven point loss to Collingwood at VU Whitten Oval in round four of the 2017 season. She played four matches in her debut season and kicked one goal. She was delisted at the conclusion of the 2017 season. In September 2018 she accepted a contract with Geelong to play in the club's inaugural season in the AFLW in 2019. She was awarded Geelong's best and fairest medal in her debut season at the club. In December 2020, McDonald was announced as Geelong's captain, replacing Melissa Hickey who retired at the end of the 2020 season. In the 2021 AFL Women's season, McDonald was awarded with her second All-Australian blazer, named on the full back position. McDonald achieved selection in Champion Data's 2021 AFLW All-Star stats team, after leading the league for average intercept possessions in the 2021 AFL Women's season, totalling 8.3 a game.

== Statistics ==
Statistics are correct to the end of 2022 season 7.

Legend
G	Goals	K	Kicks	D	Disposals	T	Tackles
B	Behinds	H	Handballs	M	Marks

Season	Team	No.	Games	Totals							Averages (per game)							Votes
Season	Team	No.	Games	G	B	K	H	D	M	T	G	B	K	H	D	M	T	Votes
2017	Western Bulldogs	15	4	1	2	9	7	16	9	3	0.3	0.5	2.3	1.8	4.0	2.3	0.8	0
2019	Geelong	11	8	0	0	80	46	126	21	10	0.0	0.0	10.0	5.8	15.8	2.6	1.3	0
2020	Geelong	11	6	1	0	43	14	57	16	8	0.3	0.0	10.8	3.5	14.3	4.0	2.0	1
2021	Geelong	11	7	0	0	92	39	131	28	14	0.0	0.0	10.2	4.3	14.6	3.1	1.6	2
2022 (S6)	Geelong	11	10	0	0	45	35	80	20	20	0.0	0.0	4.5	3.5	8.0	2.0	2.0	0
2022 (S7)	Geelong	11	11	0	0	92	43	135	41	17	0.0	0.0	8.3	3.9	12.2	3.7	1.5	1
Career			46	2	2	361	184	545	135	72	0.1	0.1	7.5	3.8	11.3	2.8	1.5	4
