= Sarah Dargan =

Australian rules footballer

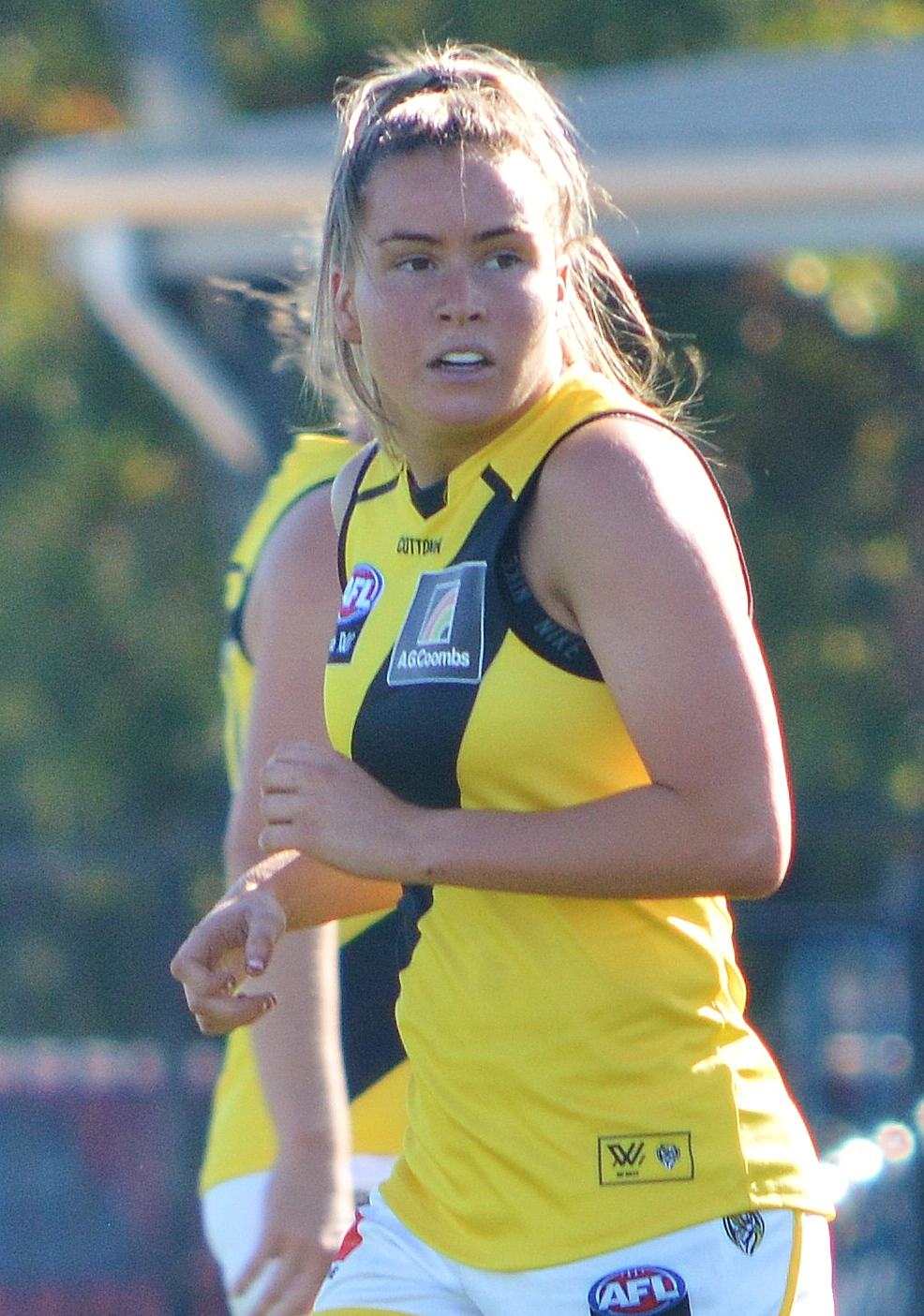
- Dargan with Richmond in February 2021

Personal information
- Born: 3 February 1999 (age 27); Melbourne
- Original team: Calder Cannons (TAC Cup)
- Draft: No. 20, 2017 AFL Women's draft
- Debut: Round 1, 2018, Collingwood vs. Carlton, at Ikon Park
- Height: 165 cm (5 ft 5 in)
- Position: Forward / Midfielder

Playing career^{1}
Years	Club	Games (Goals)
2018–2020	Collingwood	14 (2)
2021–2022 (S6)	Richmond	11 (2)
2022 (S7)	Sydney	9 (3)
Total		34 (7)
- ^{1} Playing statistics correct to the end of 2022 season 7.

Career highlights
- AFLW Rising Star nominee: 2019

Sarah Dargan (born 3 February 1999) is an Australian rules footballer who last played with Sydney in the AFL Women's competition (AFLW). She previously played three seasons with Collingwood, after being drafted to the club in the 2017 draft, and two seasons with Richmond after being traded to the club ahead of the 2021 season.

== Early life and state football ==
Dargan grew up in Melbourne with a family who love Australian rules football, kicking a ball around the backyard with her older brother, Matt. Dargan started out as a basketballer, before playing junior football for Pascoe Vale in division one of the Northern Football League, excelling as a mid-sized forward. Ahead of 2015, she joined Calder Cannons in the TAC Cup and played senior football with them for three years, being touted as a superstar. While playing with Calder Cannons, she also represented Vic Metro for 3 years. In 2015, she helped Vic Metro win the 2015 AFL Youth Girls National Championships title, scoring a goal in the Grand Final at Bendigo Bank Stadium, where they beat Queensland by seven points. This followed her two goals against Queensland in their opening match preceding it. In 2016 she was part of the Vic Metro team that won the 2016 AFL Youth Girls National Championships title. In 2017, Dargan was named one of Vic Metro's best in their opening loss to Vic Country, but due to this loss they lost the 2017 AFL Women's Under 18 Championships title to Vic Country despite winning their remaining games. In April 2018, Calder Cannon's coach, Alicia Eva, labelled Dargan as a "special kind of player" and predicted her being drafted to an AFLW club.

== AFL Women's career ==
Dargan was drafted by Collingwood with their third selection and twentieth overall in the 2017 AFL Women's draft. Collingwood's coach, Wayne Siekman, said "she is clean off the ground, has a good change of pace and knows where the goals are." Her selection defined her as a bolter, having not being invited to the combine or the draft itself. She made her debut in the eight point loss to Carlton at Ikon Park in the opening round of the 2018 season. In the winter of 2018, she played three games for Collingwood's VFL Women's (VFLW) team, before rupturing her Lisfranc ligament in her left foot, which required a long period of rest and rehabilitation. At the beginning she was upset not being able to play, but looking back she appreciated being able to see the coaches' box angle of the game which helped develop her knowledge. In round 2 of the 2019 season, Dargan kicked her first professional goal against Melbourne, which was Collingwood's first AFLW goal at the club's spiritual home, Victoria Park. In round 4 of the season, she was nominated for the AFL Women's Rising Star award, following her move to the midfield and her performance in Collingwood's nine point loss to Greater Western Sydney. She finished the game with a career-high 16 disposals, as well as laying six tackles and kicking a goal. She was surprised by the nomination, but honoured and happy to see her hard work pay off. Dargan played a key role for Collingwood in the 2019 season. In April 2019, she re-committed to Collingwood, alongside Brittany Bonnici, Ruby Schleicher, Erica Fowler, Sophie Alexander, Eliza Hynes, and captain Steph Chiocci. In August 2020, Dargan was traded together with Sarah D'Arcy to Richmond in a deal which saw Collingwood receive Aliesha Newman. In May 2022, Dargan joined expansion club Sydney for their inaugural season. In March 2023, Dargan was delisted by Sydney, having played a key role in their forward line.

== Statistics ==
Statistics are correct to round 3, 2022 season 6

Legend
G	Goals	K	Kicks	D	Disposals	T	Tackles
B	Behinds	H	Handballs	M	Marks

Season	Team	No.	Games	Totals							Averages (per game)						
Season	Team	No.	Games	G	B	K	H	D	M	T	G	B	K	H	D	M	T
2018	Collingwood	46	3	0	0	3	6	9	1	3	0.0	0.0	1.0	2.0	3.0	0.3	1.0
2019	Collingwood	46	7	2	2	51	21	72	10	28	0.3	0.3	7.3	3.0	10.3	1.4	4.0
2020	Collingwood	46	4	0	1	8	20	28	2	10	0.0	0.3	2.0	5.0	7.0	0.5	2.5
2021	Richmond	17	8	0	1	19	21	40	3	20	0.0	0.1	2.4	2.6	5.0	0.4	2.5
2022 (S6)	Richmond	17	1	1	0	5	4	9	2	1	1.0	0.0	5.0	4.0	9.0	2.0	1.0
Career			23	3	4	86	72	158	18	62	0.1	0.2	3.7	3.1	6.9	0.8	2.7
