= Jordyn Allen =

Australian rules footballer (born 2000)

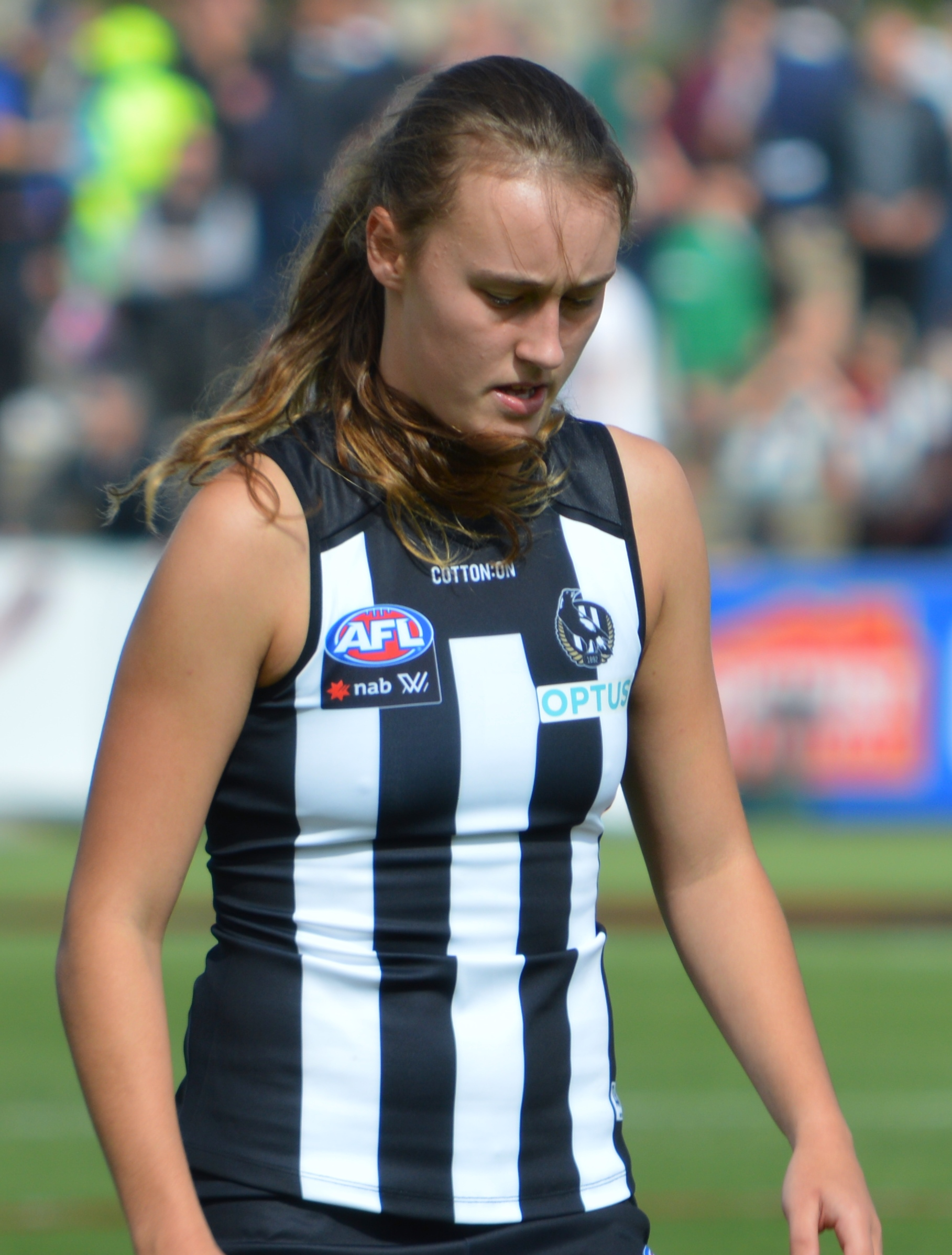
- Allen with Collingwood in February 2019

Personal information
- Full name: Jordyn Allen
- Nickname: Jordy
- Born: 6 July 2000 (age 26); Rye, Victoria
- Original team: Dandenong Stingrays (TAC Cup)
- Draft: No. 5, 2018 national draft
- Debut: Round 1, 2019, Collingwood vs. Geelong, at GMHBA Stadium
- Height: 174 cm (5 ft 9 in)
- Position: Defender / Midfielder

Club information
- Current club: Collingwood
- Number: 6

Playing career^{1}
Years	Club	Games (Goals)
2019–	Collingwood	79 (6)
- ^{1} Playing statistics correct to the end of round 9, 2026.

Career highlights
- Junior: 2× U18 All-Australian: 2017, 2018; Dandenong Stingrays captain: 2017–2018; Vic Country captain: 2018; Dandenong Stingrays best and fairest: 2018; Senior: Rising Star nomination: 2019; 22under22 team: 2021, 2022 (S6), 2022 (S7); Collingwood best and fairest (AFLW): 2022 (S7)

Jordyn Allen (born 6 July 2000) is an Australian rules footballer playing for the Collingwood Football Club in the AFL Women's competition (AFLW).

== State football ==
Allen played junior football with boys at Rye Demons in the Mornington Peninsula Junior Football League.

In 2016, Allen started playing with Dandenong Stingrays Youth Girls Academy. She also played as vice-captain for Vic Metro and helped them win the 2016 AFL Youth Girls National Championships as the team beat Western Australia by 95 points at the MCG under the coaching of Wayne Siekman. She was named Vic Metro's Most Valuable Player for her defensive efforts and leadership.

Allen was selected for the 2017 AFL Women's Under 18 All-Australian team.

Allen started the 2018 season as a top AFLW draft prospect. For a second consecutive season, she played for and captained Dandenong Stingrays in the TAC Cup. At the end of the season, she won the club's best and fairest award and was selected for the 2018 TAC Cup Team of the Year. In July, Allen captained Vic Country in the 2018 AFL Women's Under 18 Championships. At the end of the series, she was selected for the season's All-Australian team. Allen also played five games in 2018 for Casey Demons in the VFL Women's (VFLW), twice being named in the club's best players. Despite all the accolades, Allen thought she plateaued in 2018 as she felt she had to take a step back to focus on playing with passion and enjoyment.

== AFL Women's career ==
Allen was drafted by Collingwood with the club's first selection and the fifth pick overall in the 2018 AFL Women's draft. She made her debut in the club's loss against Geelong at GMHBA Stadium in the opening round of the 2019 season. In her debut season, Allen played as a defender. For the 2019 season she moved forward into the midfield and scored her first professional goal against Carlton in round 5. Allen was awarded a Rising Star nomination following her performance in Collingwood's six-point victory over Brisbane at Victoria Park in round 7, their only win of the season. In the match she collected 10 disposals, took six marks, and laid three tackles. Following the season in which she played all seven matches, in April 2019, she signed a new deal with Collingwood ahead of the 2020 season. Following AFL Women's season seven, Allen won Collingwood's AFLW best and fairest award.

== Personal life ==
Allen grew up in Rye on the Mornington Peninsula. In her junior years, she was a motocross rider for seven years, but after countless injuries and hospital stays as well as due to the financial burden, she focused on playing Australian rules football from the age of 12. She finished her VCE exams the day before her first professional pre-season campaign.

== Statistics ==
Statistics are correct the end of the 2025 season.

Legend
G	Goals	K	Kicks	D	Disposals	T	Tackles
B	Behinds	H	Handballs	M	Marks

Season	Team	No.	Games	Totals							Averages (per game)							Votes
Season	Team	No.	Games	G	B	K	H	D	M	T	G	B	K	H	D	M	T	Votes
2019	Collingwood	6	7	1	2	43	18	61	22	9	0.1	0.3	6.1	2.6	8.7	3.1	1.3	0
2020	Collingwood	6	7	1	2	34	25	59	20	3	0.1	0.3	4.9	3.6	8.4	2.9	0.4	0
2021	Collingwood	6	6	0	0	31	23	54	15	10	0.0	0.0	5.2	3.8	9.0	2.5	1.7	0
2022 (S6)	Collingwood	6	10	1	0	66	48	114	38	13	0.1	0.0	6.6	4.8	11.4	3.8	1.3	0
2022 (S7)	Collingwood	6	12	2	0	114	56	170	46	24	0.2	0.0	9.5	4.7	14.2	3.8	2.0	3
2023	Collingwood	6	10	0	1	87	37	124	42	20	0.0	0.1	8.7	3.7	12.4	3.2	2.0	0
2024	Collingwood	6	11	1	0	87	33	120	38	27	0.1	0.0	7.9	3.0	10.9	3.5	2.5	0
2025	Collingwood	6	8	0	0	73	36	109	30	14	0.0	0.0	9.1	4.5	13.6	3.8	1.8	0
Career			71	6	5	535	276	811	251	120	0.1	0.1	7.5	3.9	11.4	3.5	1.7	3
