= 2017 AFL Women's Under-18 Championships =

AFL Women's Under-18 Championships
- 2017

Tournament information
- Sport: Australian rules football
- Dates: 12 May–14 July
- Tournament format: Round-robin
- Venue(s): Adelaide Oval; Blacktown International Sportspark; Bond University; Broadbeach Sports Club; Simonds Stadium; West Adelaide
- Teams: 6 (div. 1); 3 (div. 2)

Final positions
- Champions: Vic Country (de facto)

Tournament statistics
- Matches played: 16
- MVP: Maddy Prespakis (Vic Metro)
- Most goals: Eden Zanker (Vic Country)

The 2017 NAB AFL Women's Under-18 Championships was played between May and July 2017, with six teams competing and with a further three playing in a two-match round-robin series as a de facto Division 2.

An Allies side (made up of players from the division two competition) was introduced as a division one team. This was designed to give the best prospects from those regions the opportunity to play at a national level in the division one carnival. Thus, division one was made up of six teams—Allies, NSW/ACT, Queensland, Vic Country, Vic Metro and Western Australia—playing each other across five rounds.

Vic Country was the only division one team to play four matches that went undefeated, making them the de facto tournament winners. Vic Metro's Maddy Prespakis was named the tournament's best player, while Vic Country's Eden Zanker was the competition's leading goalkicker.

== Fixture ==
=== Division 1 ===
	Round 1
Friday, 19 May	NSW/ACT 3.3 (21)	def. by	Queensland 3.6 (24)	Blacktown International Sportspark	Results
Saturday, 20 May	Western Australia 15.9 (99)	def.	NSW/ACT 2.0 (12)	Blacktown International Sportspark	Results
Sunday, 21 May	Queensland 6.8 (44)	def.	Western Australia 5.4 (34)	Blacktown International Sportspark	Results
Saturday. 17 June	Vic Country 8.6 (54)	def.	Vic Metro 4.3 (27)	Simonds Stadium	Results

	Round 2
Monday, 10 July	Queensland 3.4 (22)	def. by	Vic Country 4.8 (32)	Bond University	Results
Monday, 10 July	Allies 4.2 (26)	def.	NSW/ACT 3.5 (23)	Bond University	Results
Monday, 10 July	Vic Metro 3.2 (20)	def. by	Western Australia 6.11 (47)	Bond University	Results
Wednesday, 12 July	Queensland 3.5 (23)	def. by	Vic Metro 7.3 (45)	Broadbeach Sports Club	Results
Wednesday, 12 July	Vic Country 6.6 (42)	def.	NSW/ACT 2.3 (15)	Broadbeach Sports Club	Results
Wednesday, 12 July	Western Australia 3.2 (20)	def. by	Allies 3.7 (25)	Broadbeach Sports Club	Results
Friday, 14 July	Vic Metro 6.8 (44)	def.	NSW/ACT 5.7 (37)	Broadbeach Sports Club	Results
Friday, 14 July	Vic Country 8.8 (56)	def.	Western Australia 5.4 (34)	Broadbeach Sports Club	Results
Friday, 14 July	Allies 5.3 (33)	def.	Queensland 3.8 (26)	Broadbeach Sports Club	Results

=== Division 2 ===
	Round 1
Friday, 12 May	Tasmania 1.3 (9)	def. by	South Australia 9.4 (58)	West Adelaide	Results
Saturday, 13 May	South Australia 15.9 (99)	def.	Northern Territory 1.3 (9)	Adelaide Oval	Results
Sunday, 14 May	Northern Territory 4.5 (29)	def.	Tasmania 6.5 (41)	West Adelaide	Results

== All-Australian team ==
The 2017 Women's All-Australian team

2017 Under 18 Women's All-Australian team
B:	Lucy McEvoy (VC)	Rebecca Webster (VC)	Bridie Kennedy (VC)
HB:	Jordyn Allen (VC)	McKenzie Dowrick (WA)	Darcy Guttridge (VC)
C:	Tarni White (Qld)	Maddy Prespakis (VM)	Georgia Gee (VC)
HF:	Kalinda Howarth (Qld)	Rosie Deegan (WA)	Eloise Jones (SA/All)
F:	Tyla Hanks (VC)	Eden Zanker (VC)	Jordyn Jolliffe (NSW/ACT)
Foll:	Jessica Allan (SA/All)	Alyce Parker (NSW/ACT)	Courtney Hodder (WA)
Int:	Olivia Purcell (VC)	Arianna Clarke (Qld)	Sophie Conway (Qld)
Int:	Lauren Bella (Qld)		
Coach:	Not named		

=== Initial squad ===
- NSW/ACT: Alyce Parker, Georgia Breward, Haneen Zreika, Ellie Delgano-Fixture, Jordyn Jolliffe
- Northern Territory: Danielle Ponter
- Queensland: Kitara Farrar, Ruby Blair, Arianna Clarke, Courtney Bromage, Gabby Collingwood, Tarni White, Lauren Bella, Sophie Conway, Kalinda Howarth, Jemma Abott
- South Australia: Nikki Gore, Eloise Jones, Chloe Scheer, Jess Allen
- Tasmania: Mia King, Daria Bannister
- Vic Country: Rebecca Webster, Courtney Jones, Iilish Ross, Bridie Kennedy, Lucy McEvoy, Georgia Clarke, Darcy Guttridge, Tyla Hanks, Jordyn Allen, Aisling Tupper, Olivia Purcell, Georgia Gee, Rene Caris, Denby Taylor, Eden Zanker
- Vic Metro: Olivia Vesley, Georgia Ricardo, Georgia McPherson, Molly Warburton, Maddy Prespakis, Maddy Guerin, Olivia Flanagan, Georgia Patrikios, Emerson Woods
- Western Australia: Sabreena Duffy, McKenzie Dowrick, Courtney Hodder, Sonia Dorizzi, Tayla McAuliffe, Emily McGuire, Kate Bartlett, Rosie Deegan
