= Nina Morrison =

Australian rules footballer

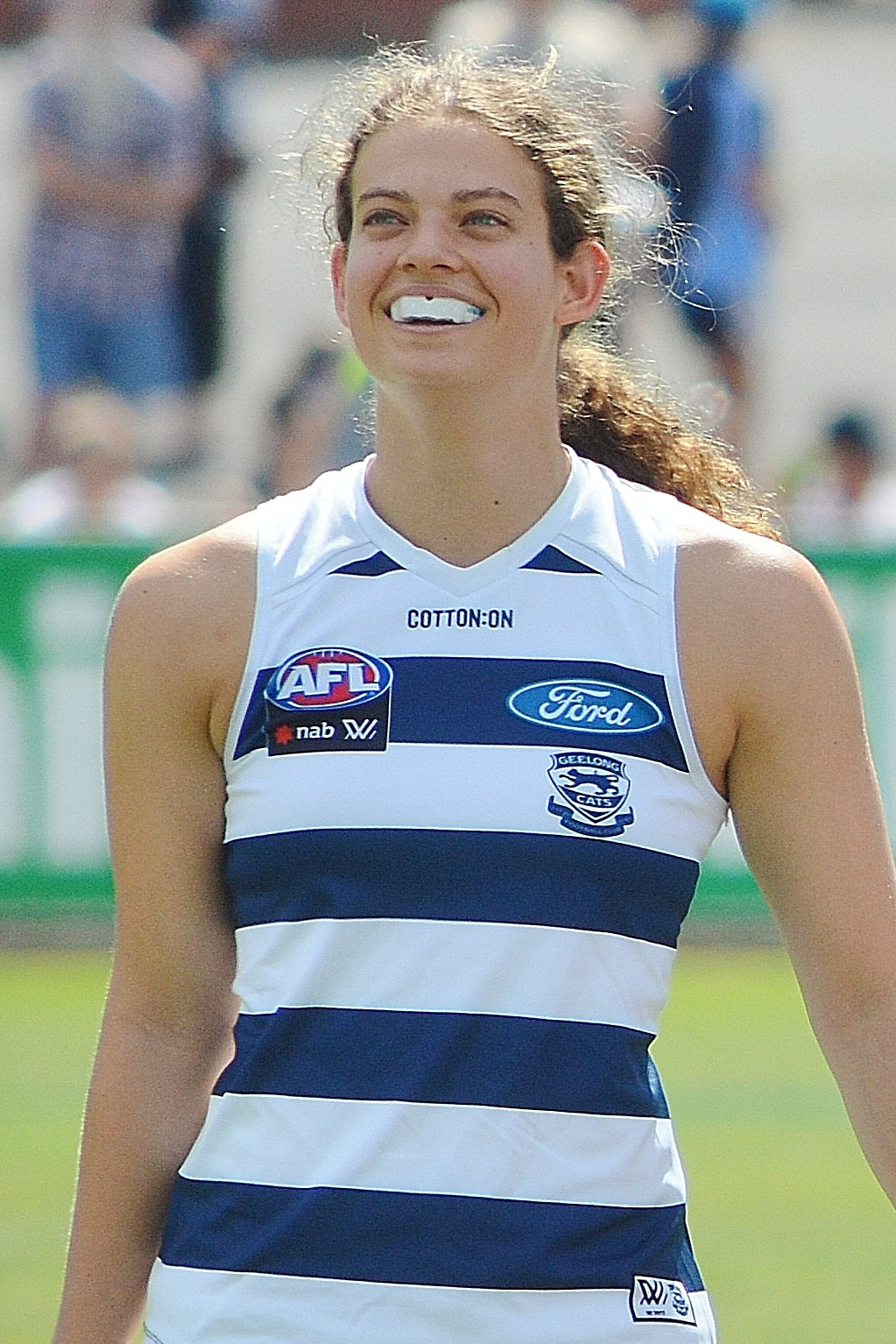
- Morrison playing for Geelong in 2020

Personal information
- Full name: Nina Morrison
- Born: 13 December 2000 (age 25)
- Original team: Geelong Cats (VFLW)
- Draft: No. 1, 2018 national draft
- Debut: Round 1, 2019, Geelong vs. Collingwood, at GMHBA Stadium
- Height: 167 cm (5 ft 6 in)
- Position: Midfielder

Club information
- Current club: Geelong
- Number: 9

Playing career^{1}
Years	Club	Games (Goals)
2019–	Geelong	39 (11)
- ^{1} Playing statistics correct to the end of the 2023 season.

Career highlights
- AFL Women's Rising Star nominee: 2019; Geelong Best & Fairest: 2024

Nina Morrison (born 13 December 2000) is an Australian rules footballer playing for the Geelong Football Club in the AFL Women's (AFLW). A midfielder who won multiple accolades at junior level and played in the VFL Women's (VFLW) as a teenager, Morrison was the first selection in the 2018 AFL Women's draft. She received a nomination for the 2019 AFL Women's Rising Star award in round 1 of the 2019 season, her debut match.

== Early life ==
Morrison attended Geelong Grammar School and grew up a Geelong supporter, citing Joel Selwood and Patrick Dangerfield as players she enjoyed watching. A long-distance runner in her youth who also played tennis and soccer at school, Morrison did not take up football until her father encouraged her to attend a Geelong trial in late 2016. Although she was unavailable for the under-18 trials as they conflicted with tennis commitments, she instead attended the senior trials, where she impressed Geelong representatives by outplaying the older women. Morrison joined the Geelong Falcons, playing in the TAC Cup Girls, and represented Vic Country in the 2017 AFL Women's Under 18 Championships. Additionally, she played for local club St Mary's, kicking thirty-five goals in eight games playing as a midfielder in the under-19 AFL Barwon league.

"She's a good runner with strong endurance. She's hard at the contest and just a really good decision-maker."

— Sam Ahmet, Vic Country coach

In 2018, Morrison won the TAC Cup Girls premiership with the Falcons and tied with Maddy Prespakis for the league best and fairest with 16 votes. She again played for Vic Country in the 2018 AFL Women's Under 18 Championships and won their most valuable player award. Morrison was named in the All-Australian side on the wing, and shared the competition's most valuable player award with Prespakis. She played four VFL Women's (VFLW) matches for the Geelong Cats, including a best-on-ground performance against Northern Territory in the elimination final and the losing grand final against Hawthorn, where she was again among the best.

Morrison tested at the AFL Women's draft combine, breaking records in the two-kilometre time trial and the yo-yo endurance test. She reached level 18.1 in the yo-yo test and ran the time trial in seven minutes and fourteen seconds, fifteen seconds faster than the previous record. Morrison additionally placed in the top five for the standing vertical jump, agility test and running vertical jump (on both the left and right sides). In the lead-up to the draft, Morrison was widely predicted to be taken by Geelong with the first selection. Draft prospects selected a state or region they wished to play in prior to the draft; options for Victorian players included Geelong, the Melbourne metropolitan area or the entire state. Morrison opted for Geelong while Prespakis, another top prospect, nominated the metropolitan area; this improved Morrison's chances of being taken with the first selection in the draft, as Geelong held the first two selections.

Morrison currently studies a Bachelor of Exercise and Sport Science at Deakin University.

== AFL Women's career ==
Morrison was drafted by Geelong with the first selection in the 2018 AFL Women's draft. Ahead of the 2019 AFL Women's season, she polled the most votes by the AFLW captains as their predicted winner of the 2019 AFL Women's Rising Star award. Morrison made her debut in the opening round of the season against Collingwood at GMHBA Stadium, where she was nominated for the AFL Women's Rising Star award after accumulating 22 disposals and eight tackles and kicking the winning behind in a best-on-ground performance. Morrison also polled the maximum ten votes in the AFLW Champion Player of the Year Award and was named in women's.afl's Team of the Week. However, she ruptured the anterior cruciate ligament in her right knee at training the following week, which required a reconstruction.

After missing the rest of the 2019 season, Morrison made a successful return to football in round 1 of the 2020 season against Fremantle at Fremantle Oval, kicking a goal. She went on to play the rest of the season; however, she ruptured the ACL in her right knee for the second time in the final-round loss to North Melbourne.

Morrison eventually returned to football in the opening round of 2022 season 6 and was named among Geelong's best players in its loss to North Melbourne. She missed round 2 due to the AFL's health and safety protocols, before returning the following round against Collingwood. Morrison then missed round 4 due to calf soreness, before returning against West Coast in round 5, where she was named among Geelong's best players. She was also among Geelong's best players in its loss to Gold Coast in round 6.

== Statistics ==
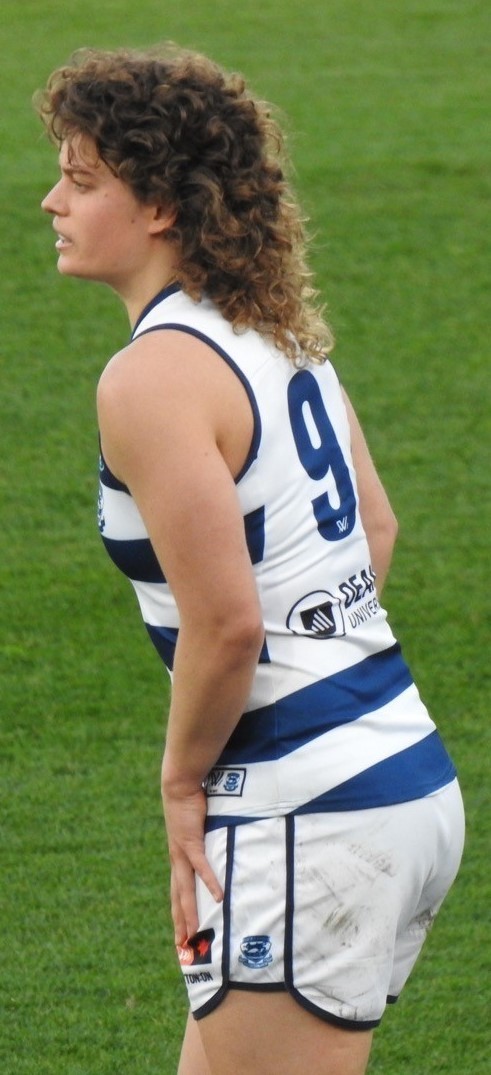
Nina Morrison playing for Geelong in 2022

Statistics are correct to the end of the 2023 AFL Women's season.

Legend
G	Goals	K	Kicks	D	Disposals	T	Tackles
B	Behinds	H	Handballs	M	Marks

Season	Team	No.	Games	Totals							Averages (per game)							Votes
Season	Team	No.	Games	G	B	K	H	D	M	T	G	B	K	H	D	M	T	Votes
2019	Geelong	9	1	0	1	13	9	22	2	8	0.0	1.0	13.0	9.0	22.0	2.0	8.0	3
2020	Geelong	9	6	1	2	52	28	80	8	25	0.2	0.3	8.7	4.7	13.3	1.3	4.2	3
2021	Geelong	9	0	—	—	—	—	—	—	—	—	—	—	—	—	—	—	0
2022 (S6)	Geelong	9	8	0	3	53	57	110	7	47	0.0	0.4	6.6	7.1	13.8	0.9	5.9	2
2022 (S7)	Geelong	9	11	4	2	99	78	177	24	63	0.4	0.2	9.0	7.1	16.1	2.2	5.7	3
2023	Geelong	9	13	6	5	150	148	298	30	67	0.5	0.4	11.5	11.4	22.9	2.3	5.2	6
Career			39	11	13	367	320	687	71	210	0.3	0.3	9.4	8.2	17.6	1.8	5.4	17

== Honours and achievements ==
Individual

- AFL Women's Rising Star nominee: 2019
- Geelong Best and fairest: 2024
