= Courteney Munn =

Australian rules football player

Personal information
- Born: 10 December 1998 (age 27)
- Original team: Southern Saints (VFLW)
- Draft: No. 36, 2018 AFL Women's draft
- Debut: Round 3, 2019, North Melbourne vs. Western Bulldogs, at University of Tasmania Stadium
- Height: 182 cm (6 ft 0 in)
- Position: Forward

Playing career^{1}
Years	Club	Games (Goals)
2019	North Melbourne	2 (4)
2020	St Kilda	3 (0)
Total		5 (4)
- ^{1} Playing statistics correct to the end of the 2020 season.

Career highlights
- AFLW Rising Star nominee: 2019

Courteney Munn (born 10 December 1998) is a retired Australian rules footballer who played for North Melbourne and for St Kilda in the AFL Women's (AFLW).

== AFLW career ==
=== North Melbourne ===
Munn was selected by North Melbourne at number 36 at the 2018 draft, and made her debut in round 3 of the 2019 season. She kicked 4 goals in her debut against the Western Bulldogs and for that performance she received a rising star nomination.

=== St Kilda ===
In April 2019, Munn joined expansion club St Kilda. In August 2020, she retired from football.
