= Haneen Zreika =

Australian rules footballer

Personal information
- Born: 15 April 1999 (age 27); Western Sydney
- Original team: Auburn-Penrith Giants (AFL Sydney)
- Draft: No. 1, 2017 rookie draft No. 69, 2018 national draft
- Debut: Round 1, 2019, Greater Western Sydney vs. Brisbane, at Moreton Bay Central Sports Complex
- Height: 157 cm (5 ft 2 in)
- Position: Inside midfielder
- Other occupation: Teacher's aide

Club information
- Current club: Greater Western Sydney
- Number: 24

Playing career^{1}
Years	Club	Games (Goals)
2018–	Greater Western Sydney	58 (10)
- ^{1} Playing statistics correct to the end of the 2025 season.

Career highlights
- AFL Women's Rising Star nominee: 2019

Haneen Zreika (born 15 April 1999) is an Australian rules footballer playing for the Greater Western Sydney Giants in the AFL Women's (AFLW). She is the first person of Lebanese descent, and the first Muslim, to play in the AFL Women's. Initially a rugby league player, Zreika switched to Australian rules football when she was 15 years old. Zreika played in the AFL Sydney competition before she was drafted by Greater Western Sydney in the 2017 rookie draft. She was delisted by the Giants at the end of the 2018 season, but was later re-selected in the 2018 draft after a strong season in the AFL Sydney. Zreika made her AFLW debut in the opening round of the 2019 season and was nominated for the 2019 AFL Women's Rising Star award in round 7.

== Early life ==
Zreika grew up in western Sydney, the youngest of five siblings. She played rugby league with her two older brothers and supported the Canterbury Bulldogs. Her mother had migrated to Australia from Lebanon when she was 16. Zreika competed in a mixed-gender rugby competition from the age of six, but was forced to stop playing when she was 12 because there were no competitions for girls of her age. She first encountered Australian rules football when she was 15; her sports teacher at Strathfield South High School invited her to a clinic scouting multicultural players. Zreika was introduced to the Auburn-Penrith Giants and began playing for them a year later in the top women's division of the AFL Sydney. She competed in the 2016 AFL Youth Girls National Championships for a combined New South Wales and Australian Capital Territory side.

In 2017, Zreika was named in the inaugural AFLW Academy, one of 33 prospective female players. As part of this squad she took part in various training camps and activities. She made a brief return to rugby league in the under-18 division of the Tarsha Gale Cup, playing as a hooker for Canterbury in the final. Zreika was named as a midfielder among 54 players in 2017 AFL Women's Under 18 Championships All-Australian squad after her performance at the competition, but did not make the final team. She tested at the AFLW draft combine in the lead-up to the 2017 draft, finishing third in the two-kilometre time trial and seventh in the yo-yo endurance test. Zreika was anticipated to be drafted by Greater Western Sydney as they were the only AFLW club in New South Wales.

== AFLW career ==
The Giants overlooked Zreika in the national draft, but later selected her with the first pick in the rookie draft. She did not play a game in 2018 and was delisted at the end of the season. Zreika returned to the Auburn-Penrith Giants and won 17 votes in the 2018 Mostyn Medal (AFL Sydney's women's best and fairest). This equalled the tally of the overall winner Pippa Smythe; however, Zreika was ineligible because of an earlier suspension.

Zreika was relisted by the Giants with pick 69 in the 2018 AFLW draft. She debuted in the opening round of the 2019 season against Brisbane. In round 7, on the day of the Christchurch mosque shootings, Zreika kicked her first AFLW goal against Geelong. Players observed a minute of silence prior to the match and wore black armbands. Zreika received the final nomination for the 2019 AFL Women's Rising Star award after collecting 17 disposals – a personal best – seven tackles and four clearances. She played five matches for the season.

In January 2022, Zreika decided to opt out of playing in the AFLW Pride Round after "deciding the jumper does not align with her religious beliefs." She repeated this in 2023 and 2024.
