= Scott Gowans =

Australian rules football coach

Personal information
- Full name: Scott Gowans

Coaching career
Years	Club	Games (W–L–D)
2019–2020	North Melbourne (W)	14 (11–3–0)
2022 (S7)–2025	Sydney (W)	45 (16–29–0)
Total		59 (27–32–0)

Scott Gowans is a former Australian rules football coach who coached in the AFL Women's (AFLW). Gowans served as senior coach of the North Melbourne Football Club from 2019 to 2020 and the Sydney Swans from season 7 to 2025.

== Coaching career ==
Gowans coached senior local men's football in West Gippsland as an assistant with Longwarry in the Ellinbank & District Football League in 2013 and 2014, before becoming senior coach during the 2015 and 2016 seasons.

In 2015 and 2016 he also served as the inaugural head coach of the Dandenong Stingrays women's academy side, including in the Stingrays 2016 Youth Girls Academy Challenge premiership win.

Gowans coached the Victoria Country side at the 2016 AFL Youth Girls National Championships before winning the national title with the same side at the 2017 Championships.

Gowans coached Diamond Creek to a grand final appearance in the VFL Women's competition in 2017.

Gowans served as an assistant coach for Carlton during the inaugural 2017 AFL Women's season.

In October 2017, Gowans was appointed as the inaugural coach of North Melbourne's new AFL Women's team, to enter the competition during the 2019 season. In 2018 Gowan crossed to become the head coach of Melbourne University in the VFL Women's competition, as part of the club's partnership with AFLW club, North Melbourne.

On 4 June 2020, Gowans' contract with the North Melbourne Football Club was not renewed.

In October 2020, Gowans joined Collingwood as a senior assistant coach in charge of the midfield.

In February 2022, Gowans was announced as the inaugural senior coach of the Sydney Swans in the AFL Women's competition.

In November 2025, Gowans resigned from his role as the Head Coach of the Sydney Swans, after a ninth-place finish in AFLW Season 10.
