= Carlton best and fairest (AFL Women's) =

- Awarded for: The best and fairest player of the Carlton Football Club in the AFL Women's
- Country: Australia
- Presented by: Carlton Football Club
- First award: 2017
- Currently held by: Dayna Finn

In the AFL Women's (AFLW), the Carlton best and fairest award is awarded to the best and fairest player at the Carlton Football Club during the home-and-away season. The award has been awarded annually since the competition's inaugural season in 2017, and Brianna Davey was the inaugural winner of the award.

== Recipients ==
**Bold**	Denotes current player
	Player won AFL Women's best and fairest in same season

Season	Recipient(s)	Ref.
2017	Brianna Davey	
2018	Katie Loynes	
2018	**Breann Moody**	
2019	Brianna Davey (2)	
2019	Maddy Prespakis	
2020	Maddy Prespakis (2)	
2021	**Darcy Vescio**	
2022 (S6)	Maddy Prespakis (3)	
2022 (S7)	**Mimi Hill**	
2023	**Breann Moody** (2)	
2024	**Keeley Sherar**	
2025	**Dayna Finn**	

=== Multiple winners ===
Player	Awards	Seasons
Maddy Prespakis	3	2019, 2020, 2022 (S6)
Brianna Davey	2	2017, 2019
**Breann Moody**	2	2018, 2023

== See also ==
- John Nicholls Medal (list of Carlton Football Club best and fairest winners in the Australian Football League)
