= 2019 AFL Women's Rising Star =

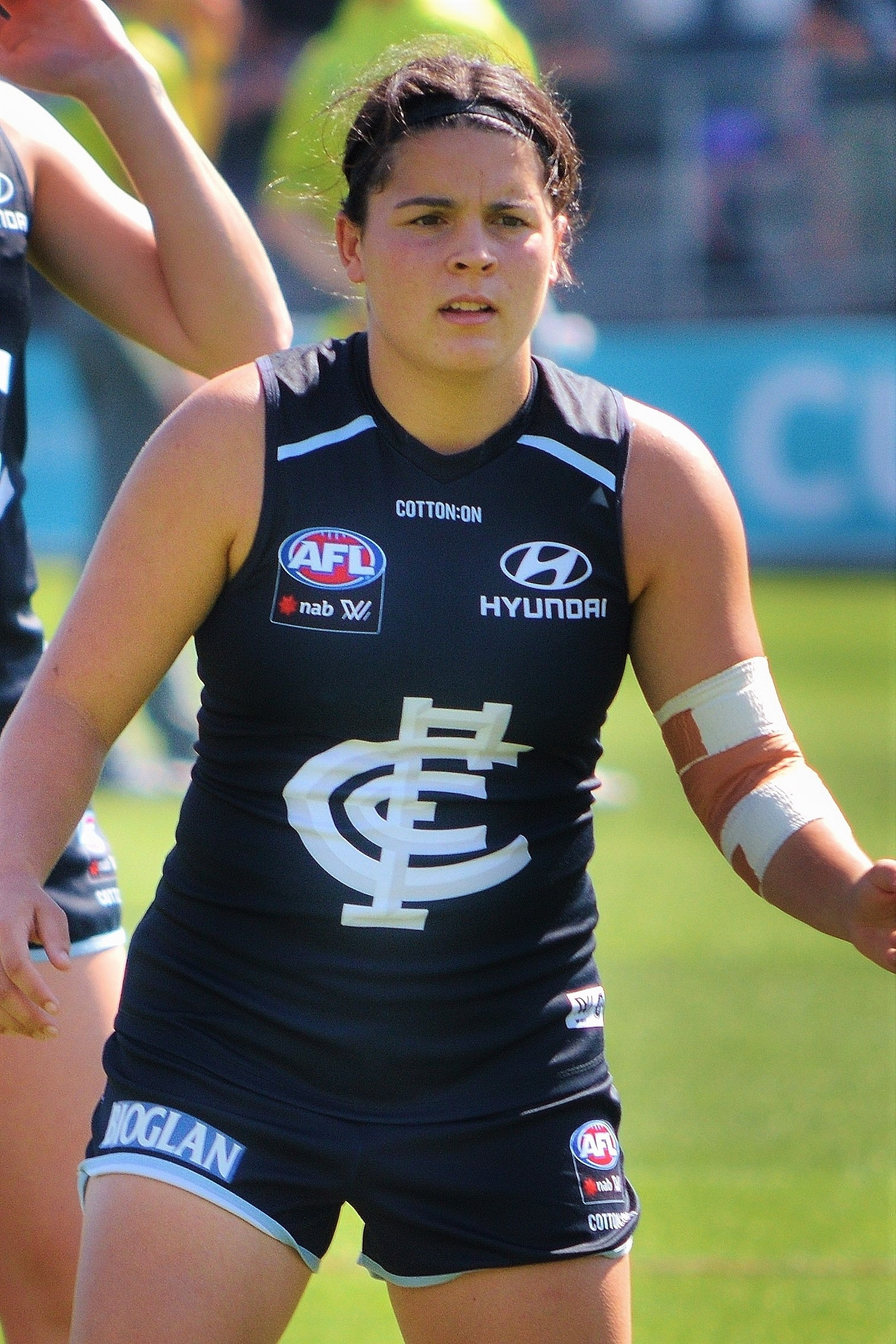
- Maddy Prespakis, 2019 winner
- Sponsored by: National Australia Bank
- Date: 2 April 2019
- Location: Docklands Stadium
- Country: Australia

The 2019 NAB AFL Women's Rising Star award was presented to the player adjudged the best young player during the 2019 AFL Women's season. Maddy Prespakis of the Carlton Football Club won the award with 49 votes.

== Eligibility ==
Every round, two nominations were given to standout young players who performed well during that particular round. To be eligible for nomination, players must have been under 21 years of age on 1 January 2019, not have been suspended during the season and never previously been nominated.

== Nominations ==
Table of nominees
Round	Player	Club	Ref.
1	Nina Morrison	Geelong	
1	Alyce Parker	Greater Western Sydney	
2	Maddy Prespakis	Carlton	
2	Sabreena Duffy	Fremantle	
3	Courteney Munn	North Melbourne	
3	Eden Zanker	Melbourne	
4	Danielle Ponter	Adelaide	
4	Sarah Dargan	Collingwood	
5	Olivia Purcell	Geelong	
5	Chloe Scheer	Adelaide	
6	Georgia Gee	Carlton	
6	Jacqui Yorston	Brisbane	
7	Jordyn Allen	Collingwood	
7	Haneen Zreika	Greater Western Sydney	

Table of nominations by club
Number	Club	Player	Nom.
2	Adelaide	Danielle Ponter	4
2	Adelaide	Chloe Scheer	5
2	Carlton	Maddy Prespakis	2
2	Carlton	Georgia Gee	6
2	Collingwood	Sarah Dargan	4
2	Collingwood	Jordyn Allen	7
2	Geelong	Nina Morrison	1
2	Geelong	Olivia Purcell	5
2	Greater Western Sydney	Alyce Parker	1
2	Greater Western Sydney	Haneen Zreika	7
1	Brisbane	Jacqui Yorston	6
1	Fremantle	Sabreena Duffy	2
1	Melbourne	Eden Zanker	3
1	North Melbourne	Courteney Munn	3

== Final voting ==
Table of votes
Placing	Player	Club	Nom.	Votes
1	Maddy Prespakis	Carlton	2	49
2	Alyce Parker	Greater Western Sydney	1	39
3	Olivia Purcell	Geelong	5	20
4	Sabreena Duffy	Fremantle	2	17
5	Danielle Ponter	Adelaide	4	13
6	Eden Zanker	Melbourne	3	7
7	Jordyn Allen	Collingwood	7	3
8	Jacqui Yorston	Brisbane	6	2
