= Maddy Prespakis =

Australian rules footballer

- Prespakis playing for Essendon in 2026

Personal information
- Full name: Madison Prespakis
- Born: 2 November 2000 (age 26)
- Original team: Melbourne University (VFLW)
- Draft: No. 3, 2018 national draft
- Debut: Round 1, 2019, Carlton vs. North Melbourne, at North Hobart Oval
- Height: 164 cm (5 ft 5 in)
- Position: Midfielder

Club information
- Current club: Essendon
- Number: 4

Playing career^{1}
Years	Club	Games (Goals)
2019–2022 (S6)	Carlton	34 (15)
2022 (S7)–	Essendon	51 (18)
Total		85 (33)
- ^{1} Playing statistics correct to the end of round 7, 2026.

Career highlights
- AFL Women's best and fairest: 2020; Essendon games record holder; 3× AFL Women's All-Australian team: 2019, 2020, S7; 3× Carlton best and fairest: 2019, 2020, S6; Essendon best and fairest: S7; AFL Women's Rising Star: 2019; AFLPA AFLW best first-year player: 2019

Madison Prespakis (born 2 November 2000) is an Australian rules footballer playing for the Essendon Football Club in the AFL Women's (AFLW). She previously played for the Carlton Football Club from 2019 to season 6. Prespakis won the 2019 AFL Women's Rising Star award in her debut season and the 2020 AFL Women's best and fairest award in her second season. She is a three-time AFL Women's All-Australian, three-time Carlton best and fairest winner and was the inaugural Essendon best and fairest winner in season 7. Prespakis is Essendon's games record holder with 51 games.

== Early life ==
Prespakis is the daughter of Damien and Jody. Her mother is an Indigenous Australian from the Djadjawurrung tribe. Prespakis has three siblings: twin sister Annalea, Georgie and Jimmy; She attended Gisborne Secondary College and supported Essendon growing up. Prespakis began playing football at four years old through the Auskick program in Romsey, north-west of Melbourne. She played in boys' teams at first, before representing the under-15 Sunbury girls side.

In 2017, Prespakis played in the premiership-winning Calder Cannons side in the TAC Cup Girls. She was named in the league's team of the year and placed second in the league's best and fairest with 20 votes. She competed at the 2017 AFL Women's Under 18 Championships for Vic Metro and was named in the All-Australian squad. In October, Prespakis was named in the 2018 AFLW Academy squad as one of twenty-nine seventeen-year-old prospects. As part of this squad, she trained with the Western Bulldogs and Collingwood over the following months.

In 2018, Prespakis became captain of the Calder Cannons and won their best and fairest award with 113 out of a possible 120 votes. She was again named in the TAC Cup Girls Team of the Year and tied with Nina Morrison for the league best and fairest. She again competed at the 2018 AFL Women's Under 18 Championships; she shared the competition's most valuable player award with Morrison on 16 votes apiece, won Vic Metro's most valuable player award and was named in the All-Australian side. She played in an exhibition game for Victoria, acting as a curtain raiser for the E. J. Whitten Legends Game. Prespakis amassed 21 disposals in Victoria's win, the most of any player. Aside from under-18 competitions, she also played six matches for Melbourne University in the VFL Women's (VFLW).

Ahead of the 2018 AFL Women's draft, Prespakis was widely predicted to be taken with one of the first selections. Prospective draftees were required to nominate a state or region they wished to play in; Prespakis selected the Melbourne metropolitan area, citing a wish to remain home with her family. This prevented Geelong from recruiting her with pick one or two and allowed Carlton the opportunity to select her with pick three.

== AFL Women's career ==
=== Carlton (2019–2022) ===
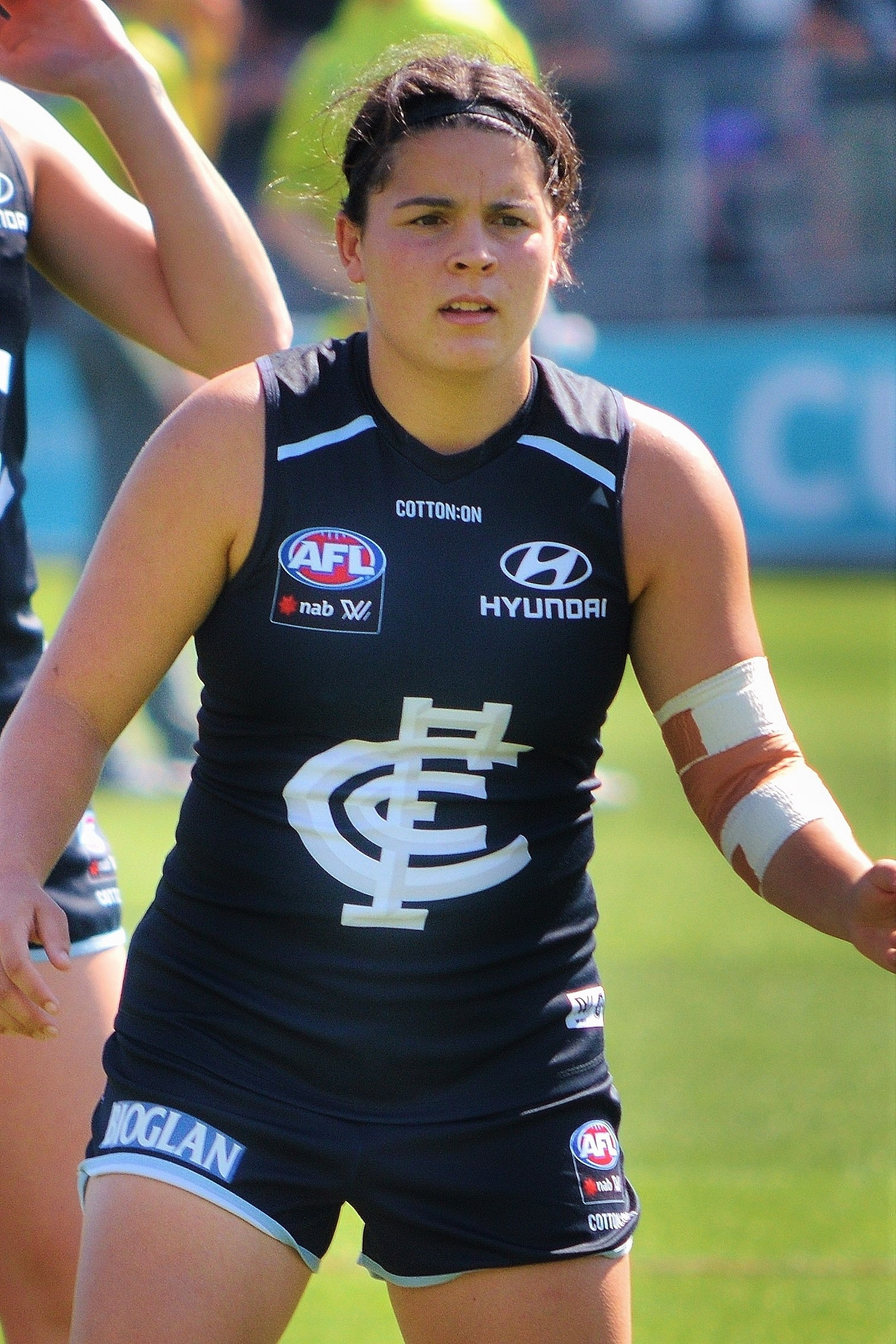
Prespakis playing for Carlton in 2019

Carlton recruited Prespakis with their first selection and third overall in the 2018 AFL Women's draft. She made her AFL Women's debut in the opening round of the 2019 season against North Melbourne at North Hobart Oval. The following round, she was nominated for the 2019 AFL Women's Rising Star award after kicking one goal and amassing 20 disposals, seven clearances and nine contested possessions against Adelaide. Prespakis went on to play in the 2019 AFL Women's Grand Final loss to Adelaide in front of a record AFL Women's crowd, and was among Carlton's best players. Following a debut season in which she averaged 19 disposals and kicked seven goals across nine games, Prespakis won the 2019 AFL Women's Rising Star award with 49 votes and was named in the 2019 AFL Women's All-Australian team. She also won the AFLW Players' best first-year player award and tied for the Carlton best and fairest award with captain Brianna Davey, capping off a memorable first season.

Leading into the 2020 season, womens.afl journalist Sarah Black named Prespakis at no. 23 on her list of the top 30 players in the AFLW. She was selected in womens.afl's Team of the Week in rounds 1, 3 and 6, and tied with North Melbourne's Jasmine Garner and Melbourne's Karen Paxman as womens.afl's player of the year. Prespakis was selected in the 2020 AFL Women's All-Australian team, and was also selected as vice-captain in the AFL Players Association's inaugural AFL Women's 22under22 team, having earlier been selected in the retrospective 2017–2019 team. She went on to win her second Carlton best and fairest award, after coming second in voting for the AFLW Players' most valuable player award for that season, and capped off her season by winning the 2020 AFL Women's best and fairest award with 15 votes, at just 19 years of age; in doing so, she became the first indigenous player to win the award. She later said that she had turned to Carlton AFL co-captain Patrick Cripps at times during the season for advice on how to deal with taggers.

Leading into the 2021 season, Sarah Black named Prespakis at no. 1 on her annual list of the top 30 players in the AFLW. Prespakis was best afield in Carlton's win against St Kilda in round 3, recording 24 disposals and a goal, and was selected in womens.afl's Team of the Week for that round. She was again among the best afield the following week against Richmond with 19 disposals and two goals, and was again selected in womens.afl's Team of the Week, but was cited for a dangerous tackle on former teammate Sarah Hosking, which eventuated in a one-match suspension. Prespakis attempted to overturn the suspension at the AFL Tribunal but was unsuccessful, ruling her out of the competition's inaugural indigenous round and meaning she would be ineligible for that year's AFL Women's best and fairest award. She was best afield upon her return against Geelong in round 6 with 27 disposals and a goal, despite injuring her left elbow in the first quarter, and again won selection in womens.afl's Team of the Week.

Prespakis was named at no. 17 in Sarah Black's 2022 list of the top 30 players in the AFLW. She was named Carlton's best player in its opening round loss to Collingwood and was best afield with a career-high 29 disposals in Carlton's win over Geelong in round 2, which saw Prespakis play against her sister Georgie for the first time; she also polled six coaches' votes and was selected in womens.afl's Team of the Week for that round. Prespakis was named Carlton's best player with 27 disposals in its loss to Brisbane in round 3 and was also selected in womens.afl's Team of the Week for that round. She was among Carlton's best players every other match for the season, polling eight coaches' votes in Carlton's win over Greater Western Sydney in round 8.

=== Essendon (2022–present) ===
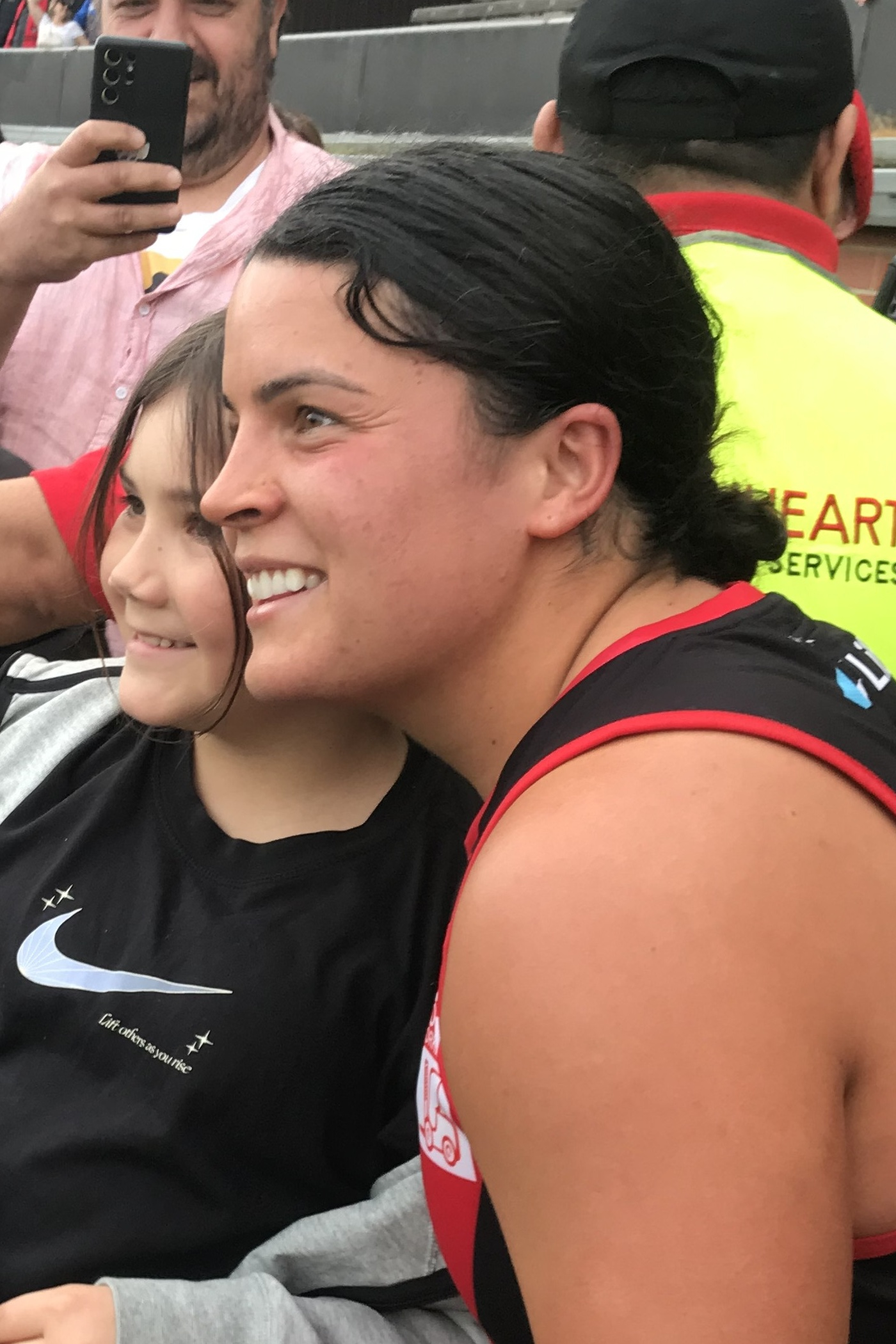
Prespakis post-match with Essendon in 2023

In April 2022, Prespakis and teammate Georgia Gee accepted deals to join Essendon's inaugural AFLW team, with both signing on the opening day of the expansion signing period in May.

Leading into the 2023 season, Sarah Black named Prespakis at no. 11 on her annual list of the top 30 players in the AFLW.

In 2024, Prespakis was named among Essendon's best players in losses to Fremantle in week 1 and St Kilda in week 3, and was Essendon's best player in its win over West Coast in week 2 with 27 disposals.

== Statistics ==
Updated to the end of round 7, 2026.

Legend
G	Goals	K	Kicks	D	Disposals	T	Tackles
B	Behinds	H	Handballs	M	Marks
±	Won that season's AFLW B&F

Season	Team	No.	Games	Totals							Averages (per game)							Votes
Season	Team	No.	Games	G	B	K	H	D	M	T	G	B	K	H	D	M	T	Votes
2019	Carlton	4	9	7	3	113	59	172	17	28	0.8	0.3	12.6	6.6	19.1	1.9	3.1	5
2020	Carlton	4	7	3	3	88	61	149	19	21	0.4	0.4	12.6	8.7	21.3	2.7	3.0	15^{±}
2021	Carlton	4	8	4	4	79	90	169	13	33	0.5	0.5	9.9	11.3	21.1	1.6	4.1	10
2022 (S6)	Carlton	4	10	1	2	90	115	205	24	35	0.1	0.2	9.0	11.5	20.5	2.4	3.5	7
2022 (S7)	Essendon	4	10	6	3	119	118	237	22	49	0.6	0.3	11.9	11.8	23.7	2.2	4.9	17
2023	Essendon	4	11	5	2	146	142	288	32	56	0.5	0.2	13.3	12.9	26.2	2.9	5.1	10
2024	Essendon	4	12	3	7	176	105	281	32	37	0.3	0.6	14.7	8.8	23.4	2.7	3.1	18
2025	Essendon	4	11	2	3	141	117	258	32	46	0.2	0.3	12.8	10.6	23.5	2.9	4.2	3
2026	Essendon	4	7	2	1	146	73	219	13	27	0.3	0.1	20.9	10.4	31.3	1.9	3.9	
Career			85	33	28	1098	880	1978	204	332	0.4	0.3	12.9	10.4	23.3	2.4	3.9	85

== Personal life ==
Prespakis' younger sister Georgie currently plays for Geelong, having been selected with the second selection in the 2021 AFL Women's draft. Early in their careers, Prespakis dated then-Gold Coast player Serene Watson. In 2024, Prespakis began dating entrepreneur and longtime friend Sophie Cachia, ex-wife of former Carlton AFL player Jaryd Cachia and daughter of former Essendon player and Fitzroy and Adelaide coach Robert Shaw. In 2026, Prespakis and Cachia became engaged.

== Honours and achievements ==
- AFL Women's best and fairest: 2020
- Essendon games record holder
- 3× AFL Women's All-Australian team: 2019, 2020, S7
- 3× Carlton best and fairest: 2019, 2020, S6
- Essendon best and fairest: S7
- AFL Women's Rising Star: 2019
- AFLPA AFLW best first-year player: 2019
