= Emerson Woods =

Australian rules footballer

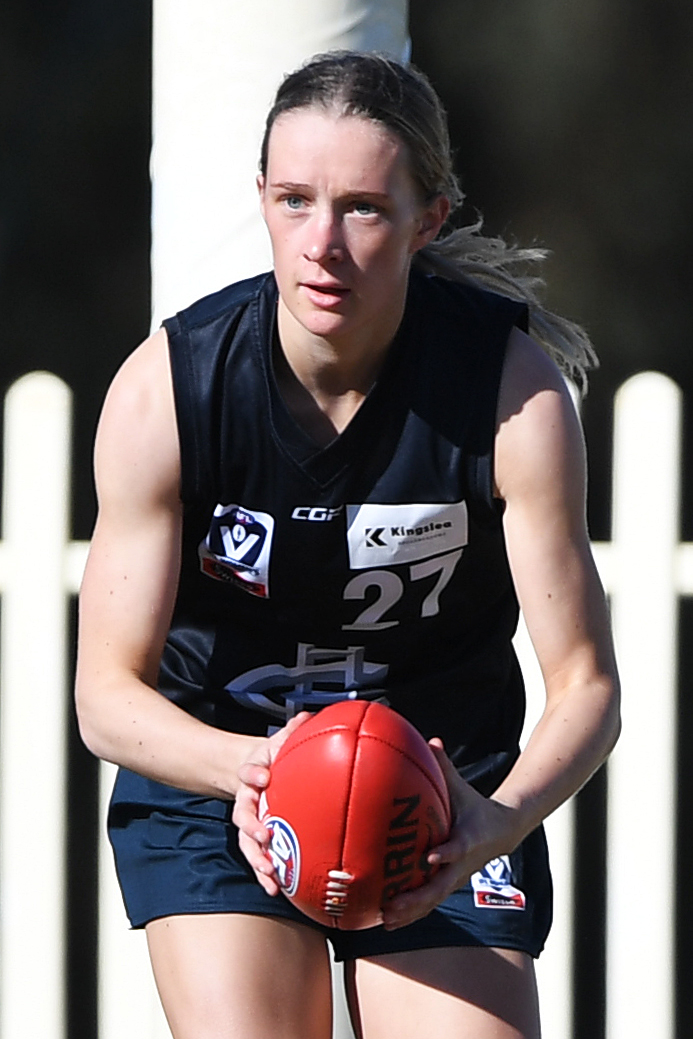
- Woods in June 2019

Personal information
- Born: 12 July 2000 (age 26)
- Original team: Eastern Ranges (TAC Cup)
- Draft: No. 38, 2018 national draft
- Debut: Round 5, 2019, Carlton vs. Collingwood, at Ikon Park
- Height: 171 cm (5 ft 7 in)
- Position: Midfielder

Playing career^{1}
Years	Club	Games (Goals)
2019–2020	Carlton	1 (0)
- ^{1} Playing statistics correct to the end of the 2020 season.

Emerson Woods (born 12 July 2000) is an Australian rules footballer playing for Carlton in the AFL Women's (AFLW). She played junior football in the TAC Cup Girls and the VFL Women's before she was selected with pick 38 in the 2018 AFLW national draft. Woods debuted in round 5 of the 2019 season.

== Junior career ==
Woods attended Mount Lilydale Mercy College in Melbourne. Originally a basketballer, she first played football in 2016 for Mount Evelyn in the Eastern Region Women's League after playing several matches at her school. In 2017, Woods played for the Eastern Ranges in the first season of the TAC Cup Girls, and was named in the league's team of the year. She also represented Vic Metro at the AFL Women's Under 18 Championships. Woods was named in the AFLW Academy, one of 29 seventeen-year-old prospects. As part of the squad she could train with AFL clubs and attend development camps.

In early 2018, Woods was cited alongside Eastern Ranges teammate Georgia Macpherson as the club's likely inaugural draftees. She co-captained the Ranges for the 2018 season and was again named in the competition's team of the year. In June, Woods played seven matches for Hawthorn in the VFL Women's, including their premiership victory over Geelong. She was still in secondary school at the time, completing Year 12. Woods again attended the AFL Women's Under 18 Championships but was limited by a heavy cold. Ahead of the 2018 AFLW national draft, she attended the draft combine, completing the 20-metre (66 ft) sprint in a record time of 3.129 seconds. Woods also placed second in the endurance yo-yo test, third in the agility test and the 2-kilometre (1.2 mi) time trial, and fifth in the standing vertical jump.

== AFLW career ==
Woods was selected by Carlton with pick 38 in the 2018 AFLW national draft. She debuted in round 5 against Collingwood at Ikon Park.

== Personal life ==
Outside of football, Woods studies criminology and psychology at La Trobe University.

Woods has been a Carlton supporter since her childhood.
