= 2020 AFL Women's best and fairest =

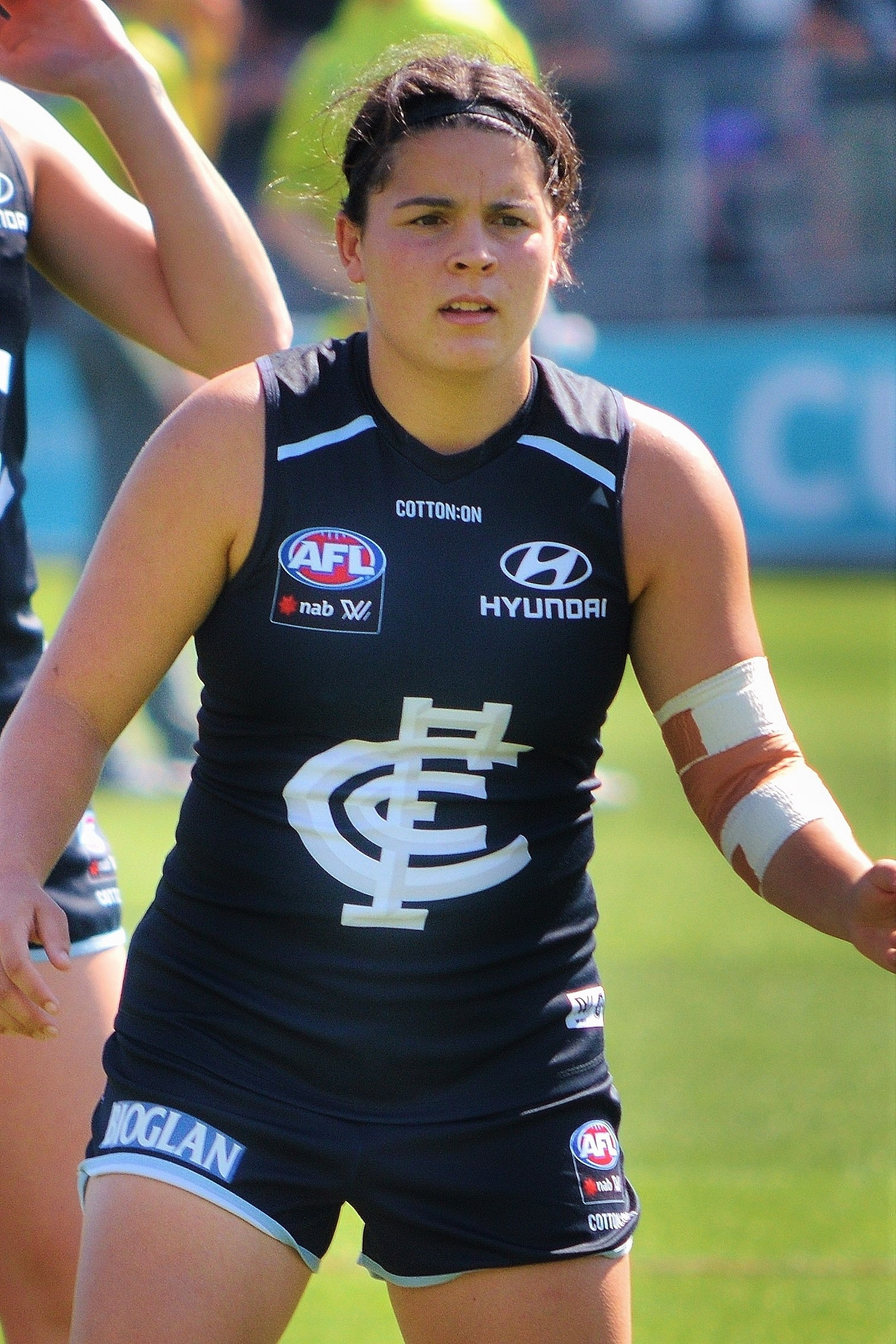
- 2020 AFL Women's best and fairest winner Maddy Prespakis
- Date: 28 April
- Hosted by: Sarah Jones
- Winner(s): Maddy Prespakis; Carlton (15 votes)

Television/radio coverage
- Network: Fox Footy

The 2020 AFL Women's best and fairest was the award presented to the player adjudged the best and fairest player during the cancelled 2020 AFL Women's season. Maddy Prespakis of the Carlton Football Club won the award with 15 votes.

== Leading votegetters ==
Placing	Player	Votes
1st	Maddy Prespakis (Carlton)	15
2nd	Kiara Bowers (Fremantle)	12
3rd	Emma Kearney (North Melbourne)	11
=4th	Jenna Bruton (North Melbourne)	10
=4th	Anne Hatchard (Adelaide)	10
6th	Karen Paxman (Melbourne)	9
=7th	Brittany Bonnici (Collingwood)	7
=7th	Monique Conti (Richmond)	7
=7th	Jaimee Lambert (Collingwood)	7
=7th	Georgia Patrikios (St Kilda)	7

== Voting procedure ==
The three field umpires (the umpires who control the flow of the game, as opposed to goal or boundary umpires) confer after each match and award three votes, two votes and one vote to the players they regard as the best, second-best and third-best in the match, respectively. The votes are kept secret until the awards night, and are read and tallied on the evening.
