= Olivia Purcell =

Australian rules footballer

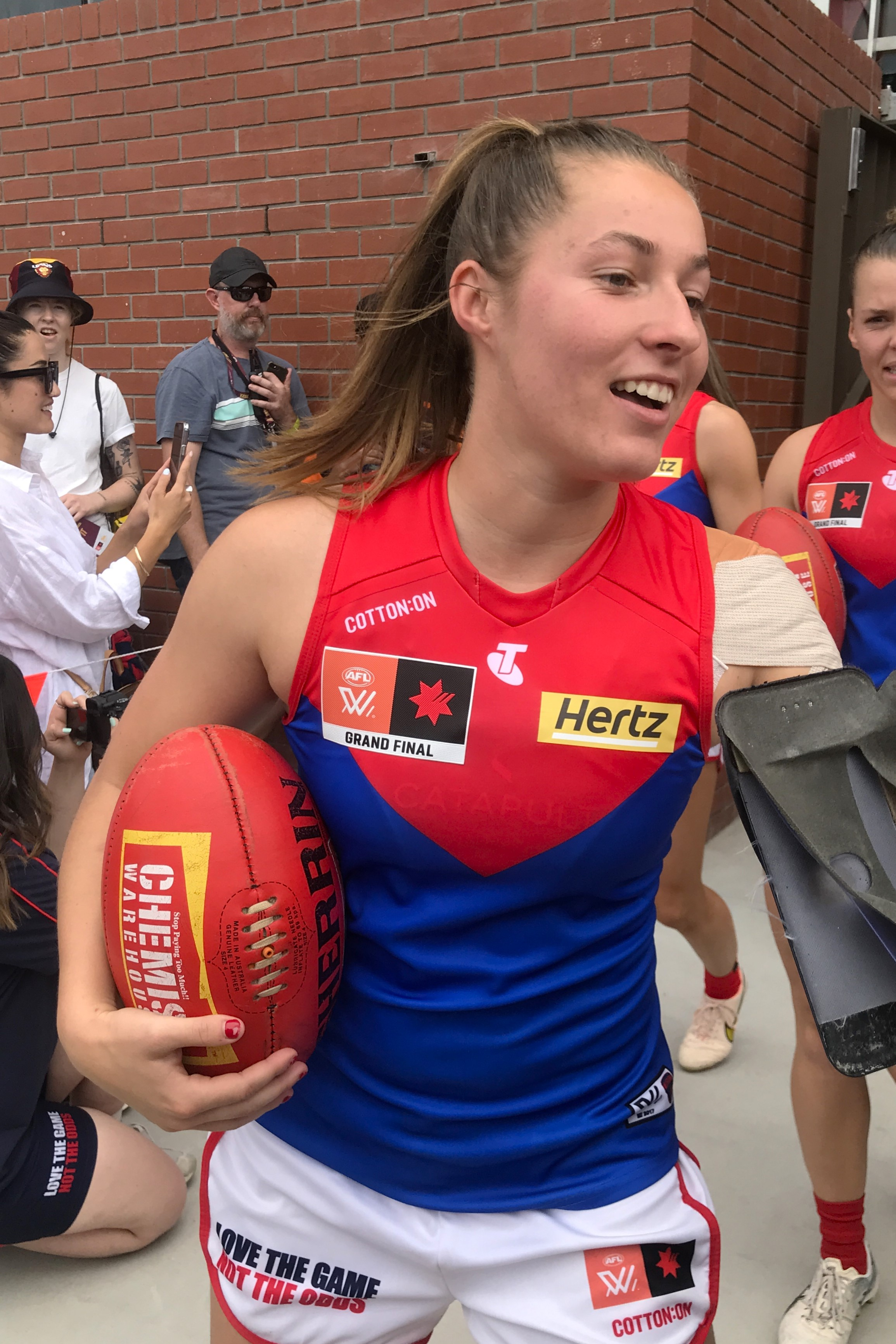
- Purcell with Melbourne in 2022

Personal information
- Born: 5 September 2000 (age 26); Geelong, Victoria
- Original team: Geelong U18
- Draft: No. 14, 2018 national draft
- Debut: Round 1, 2019, Geelong vs. Collingwood, at GMHBA Stadium
- Height: 164 cm (5 ft 5 in)
- Position: Midfielder

Club information
- Current club: Melbourne

Playing career^{1}
Years	Club	Games (Goals)
2019–2021	Geelong	19 (6)
2022–	Melbourne	31 (5)
Total		50 (11)
- ^{1} Playing statistics correct to the end of the 2023 season.

Career highlights
- AFLW premiership player: Season 7 (2022); Geelong best and fairest: 2020; 2× AFL Women's All-Australian team: 2020, S7 (2022)

Olivia Purcell (born 5 September 2000) is an Australian rules footballer with the Melbourne Football Club in the AFL Women's (AFLW).

== Early life ==
Purcell was born in Geelong, Victoria and is the second-youngest of five sisters. The family moved to the Sunshine Coast in Queensland when she was a young child before returning to Geelong where Purcell attended Sacred Heart College for school. As well as playing school football, Purcell played in local leagues with clubs such as St Mary's, before playing with the Geelong Falcons in 2018 and helping the team win the premiership in the TAC Cup.

As a result of her success at junior level, Purcell received multiple selections in the TAC Cup's "Team of the Year" and was named in the 2018 AFLW Under-18 All-Australian representative team. In the same year she also helped Geelong's VFL Women's team reach the grand final, and was subsequently drafted with selection number fourteen in the 2018 AFL Women's draft by the club.

== AFL Women's career ==
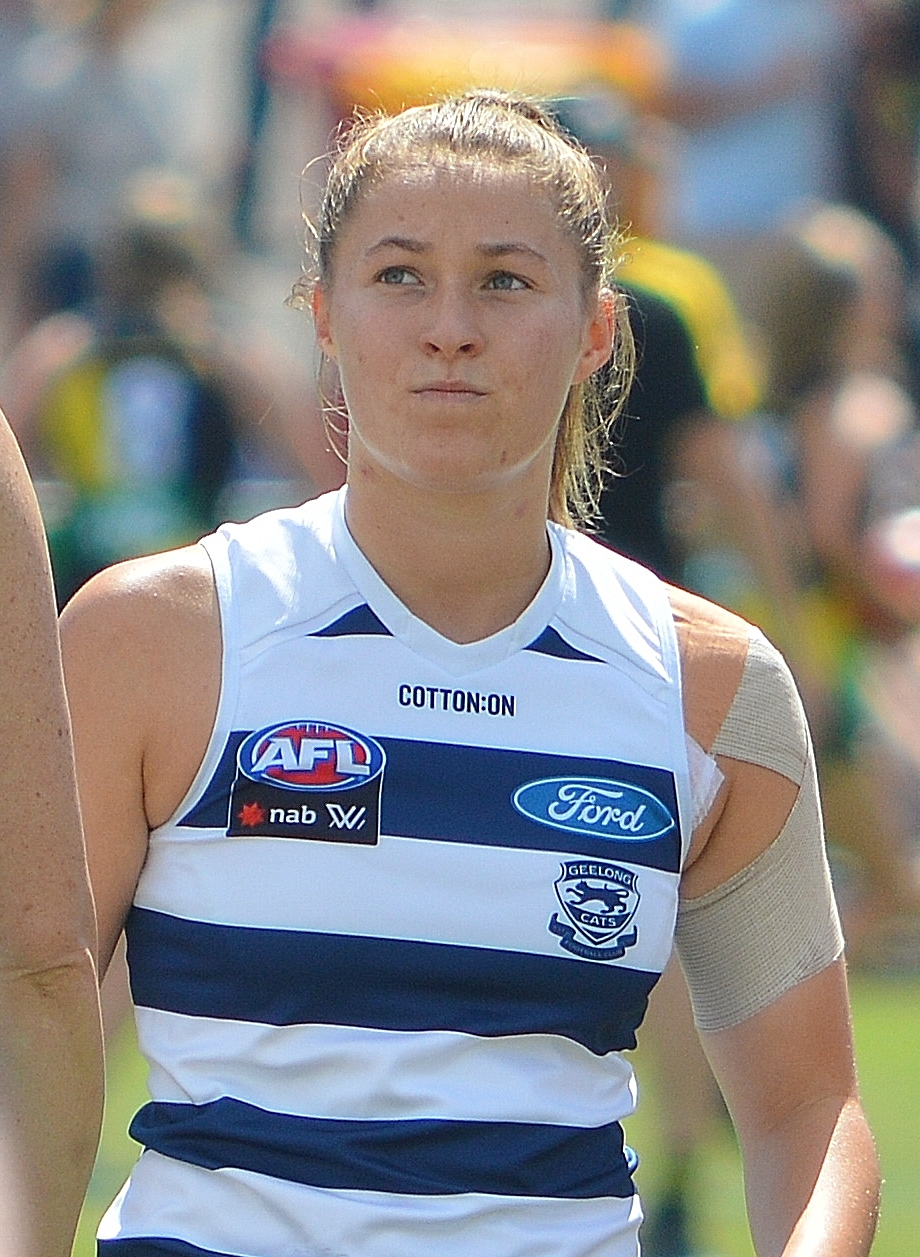
Purcell with Geelong in 2020

Purcell made her AFLW debut during the first round of the 2019 season, against Collingwood at GMHBA Stadium. The 2020 AFL Women's season saw Purcell obtain her first AFL Women's All-Australian team selection, named in the half forward position.

It was revealed that Purcell was likely to request a trade to Melbourne in May 2021 in order to play with a team contending for a flag. Purcell was traded to Melbourne on 8 June.

== Honours ==
Individual

- 2018 Under-18 All Australian team
- 2019 AFL Women's Rising Star Nominee: Round 5
- Geelong Football Club AFLW Best & Fairest: 2020
- AFL Women's All-Australian team: 2020 (Half forward)

AFL Women’s All-Australian Team:2022

- 2018 TAC Cup Girls Premiers: 2018
