= Brian Shinners =

Australian rules footballer

Personal information
- Full name: Brian Patrick Shinners
- Born: 6 August 1949 (age 77)
- Original team: St Mary's
- Height: 183 cm (6 ft 0 in)
- Weight: 83 kg (183 lb)

Playing career^{1}
Years	Club	Games (Goals)
1969	Richmond	2 (0)
1970–72	Hawthorn	16 (2)
1973–79	Dandenong (VFA)	
Total		18 (2)
- ^{1} Playing statistics correct to the end of 1972.

Brian Patrick Shinners (born 6 August 1949) is a former Australian rules footballer who played with Richmond and Hawthorn in the Victorian Football League (VFL) and with Dandenong in the Victorian Football Association (VFA).

His brother Kevin Shinners also played for Richmond and his granddaughter, Georgia Gee played in the AFL Women's competition with Carlton.
