= Alyce Parker =

Australian rules football player

Alyce Elizabeth Parker

Personal information
- Born: 15 August 2000 (age 26); Holbrook, New South Wales
- Original team: Thurgoona Bulldogs (TDFL)
- Draft: No. 12, 2018 AFL Women's draft
- Debut: Round 1, 2019, Greater Western Sydney vs. Brisbane, at Moreton Bay Sports Complex
- Height: 167 cm (5 ft 6 in)
- Position: Midfielder

Club information
- Current club: Greater Western Sydney
- Number: 3

Playing career^{1}
| Years | Club | Games (Goals) |
| 2019– | Greater Western Sydney | 73 (16) |
- ^{1} Playing statistics correct to the end of the 2026 season.

Career highlights
- Senior: 4× Gabrielle Trainor Medal: 2020–2022 (S7), 2026; 2× All-Australian: 2020, 2021; 2× 22under22 team: 2017–2019, 2020; Junior: 2× Under 18 All-Australian: 2017, 2018

Alyce Parker (born 15 August 2000) is an Australian rules footballer playing for the Greater Western Sydney Giants in the AFL Women's competition (AFLW).

== Early life and junior football ==
Parker was born and raised in Holbrook, New South Wales An active participant in numerous sports, she first tried Australian Rules in year seven and became a standout women's player at the Holbrook Football Netball Club and later the Thurgoona Football Club in nearby Albury, New South Wales.

Parker was recruited by Greater Western Sydney Giants with pick 12 in the 2018 draft.

== AFL Women's career ==
Parker made her AFLW debut in round one of the 2019 season. She was a two-time Under-18 All Australian as a junior and received a nomination for the rising star award for her debut game against Brisbane. The 2020 AFL Women's season saw Parker obtain her first AFL Women's All-Australian team selection, named on the interchange bench. In the 2021 AFL Women's season, Parker was awarded with her second consecutive All-Australian blazer, named in the rover position. Parker achieved selection in Champion Data's 2021 AFLW All-Star stats team, after leading the league for average contested possessions in the 2021 AFL Women's season, totalling 14.9 a game, the highest number ever recorded in the AFLW to that point.

== Statistics ==
Statistics are correct to the end of the 2021 season.

Legend
| G | Goals | K | Kicks | D | Disposals | T | Tackles |
| B | Behinds | H | Handballs | M | Marks |
| † | Led the league for the season |

| Season | Team | No. | Games | Totals | | | | | | | Averages (per game) | | | | | | | Votes |
| Season | Team | No. | Games | G | B | K | H | D | M | T | G | B | K | H | D | M | T | Votes |
|---|---|---|---|---|---|---|---|---|---|---|---|---|---|---|---|---|---|---|
| 2019 | Greater Western Sydney | 3 | 7 | 0 | 3 | 67 | 47 | 114 | 13 | 29 | 0.0 | 0.4 | 9.6 | 6.7 | 16.3 | 1.9 | 4.1 | 0 |
| 2020 | Greater Western Sydney | 3 | 7 | 0 | 2 | 100 | 48 | 148 | 19 | 20 | 0.0 | 0.3 | 14.3 | 6.9 | 21.1 | 2.7 | 2.9 | 6 |
| 2021 | Greater Western Sydney | 3 | 9 | 1 | 2 | 141 | 74 | 215 | 27 | 46 | 0.1 | 0.2 | 15.7 | 8.2 | 23.9^{‡} | 3.0 | 5.1 | 14 |
| Career | | | 23 | 1 | 7 | 308 | 169 | 477 | 59 | 95 | 0.1 | 0.3 | 13.4 | 7.3 | 20.7 | 2.6 | 4.1 | 6 |
