= Danielle Ponter =

Australian rules footballer (born 2000)

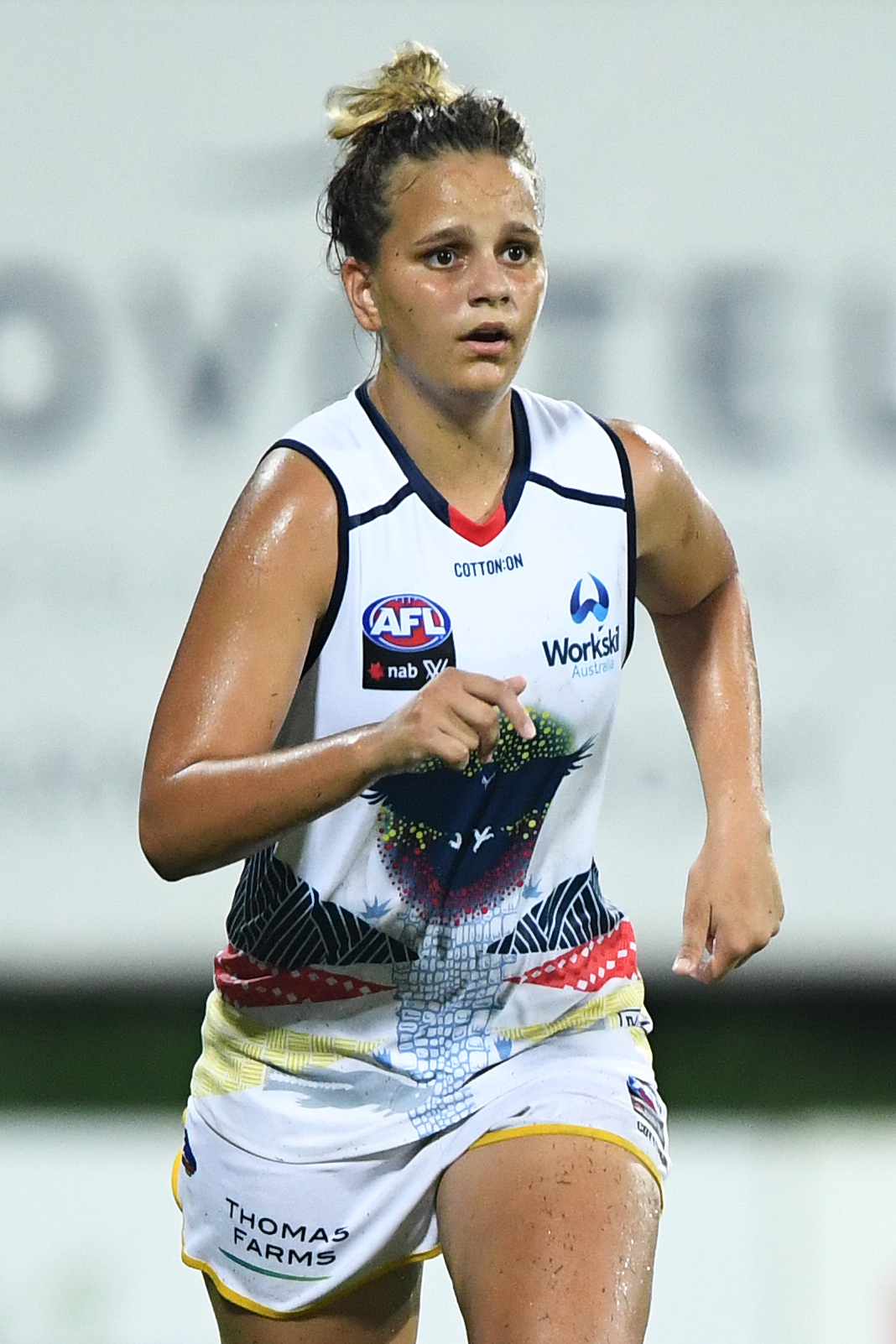
- Ponter playing for Adelaide in January 2019

Personal information
- Full name: Danielle Ann Ponter
- Born: 8 January 2000 (age 26); Darwin, Northern Territory
- Original teams: St Mary's (NTFL); Essendon (VFLW)
- Draft: No. 48, 2018 AFLW draft
- Debut: Round 2, 2019, Adelaide vs. Carlton, at Ikon Park
- Height: 161 cm (5 ft 3 in)
- Position: Forward

Club information
- Current club: Adelaide
- Number: 15

Playing career^{1}
Years	Club	Games (Goals)
2019–	Adelaide	86 (91)
- ^{1} Playing statistics correct to the end of 2023.

Career highlights
- 2× AFL Women's premiership player: 2019, 2022 (S6); AFL Women's All-Australian team: 2023; 2× Adelaide leading goalkicker: 2020, 2023; Mark of the Year: 2021; AFLW Rising Star nominee: 2019

Danielle Ann Ponter (born 8 January 2000) is an Australian rules footballer playing for Adelaide Football Club in the AFL Women's (AFLW). She played for St Mary's and Essendon in her junior career, typically as a forward. Ponter was selected with pick 48 in the 2018 AFL Women's draft and made her debut in round 2 of the 2019 season. She was nominated for the 2019 AFL Women's Rising Star award in round 4.

She is sometimes referred to as Danielle Paredes, which would have been her married name had she chosen to adopt the name of her spouse.

== Early life and education ==
Danielle Ann Ponter was born on 8 January 2000 in Darwin, Northern Territory. She had a strong footballing background as part of the noted Rioli–Long family; she is the niece of former Essendon player Michael Long and the cousin of former Hawthorn footballer Cyril Rioli.

== Early football ==
Ponter began playing for St Mary's at 11 in the under-16 female division of Northern Territory Football League (NTFL), in the 2011–12 season.

Ponter competed at the 2014 AFL Women's Under 18 Championships for the Thunder Devils (a combined Northern Territory–Tasmania team) at 14. She competed at the next three championships and additionally played for the Central Allies in a state of origin match in 2017 and 2018. Ponter attended the 2018 AFLW draft combine and was a member of the 2018 AFLW Academy, one of 29 seventeen-year-old prospects.

She played for Essendon's VFL Women's side in 2018, kicking six goals in six matches. Ahead of the 2018 AFLW draft, prospects nominated a state or region they wished to play in; Ponter chose South Australia, meaning Adelaide, as the only South Australian club, was the only team with an opportunity to select her.

== AFLW career ==
"The things she can do with a footy are phenomenal. I don't know if I've seen any other young player like her."

— Aasta O'Connor, AFLW talent manager

Ponter was drafted by Adelaide with pick 48 in the 2018 AFLW draft, their fifth selection. She continued to play in the NTFL prior to the 2019 AFL Women's season. She was not selected for the opening round of the 2019 season; coach Matthew Clarke acknowledged she was "pretty stiff to miss out". Ponter made her debut the next round, playing as a defender in contrast to her usual position of forward in her junior career. This made her the first member of the Rioli–Long family to play top-level women's Australian rules football. She returned to the forward line in round 4 and received a nomination for the 2019 AFL Women's Rising Star award after kicking two goals.

Ponter became a premiership player in 2019 and again in 2022 (season 6). She kicked two of Adelaide's four goals in the 13-point victory over Melbourne in the 2022 season 6 Grand Final.

In 2023 AFL Women's season, Ponter kicked 20 goals including the finals series, the most memorable of which was a goal from the centre square against Richmond. This tally allowed her to overtake Erin Phillips as the Crows' all-time leading goalscorer. In the same year, Ponter earned her first All-Australian selection. She kicked a career-best five goals in 2024 against Hawthorn at Unley Oval.

Ponter was placed on Adelaide's inactive list ahead of the 2026 season due to her pregnancy.

== Personal life ==
Ponter was married to her partner Nate on 14 April 2026. Ponter chose to keep her maiden name, rather than taking on the name Paredes. The couple announced their pregnancy in June of 2026, with their first child expected in December of that year.

== Recognition and awards ==
While playing for St Mary's, Ponter won the Sharyn Smith Medal, the division best and fairest, in four consecutive seasons.

She was nominated for the 2019 AFL Women's Rising Star award. In 2021, Ponter won the Mark of the Year, and in 2023, she was selected in the All-Australian team.

At the 2025 NAIDOC Awards Ponter was presented with the Sportsperson Award.
