= Kate Bartlett =

Australian rules footballer (born 1999)

Personal information
- Born: 6 November 1999 (age 26)
- Original team: Peel Thunderbirds (WAWFL)
- Draft: No. 26, 2018 national draft
- Debut: Round 7, 2019, Western Bulldogs vs. Carlton, at Whitten Oval
- Height: 173 cm (5 ft 8 in)
- Position: Key forward

Playing career^{1}
Years	Club	Games (Goals)
2019	Western Bulldogs	1 (0)
2020; 2022 (S7)–2024	West Coast	16 (6)
Total		17 (6)
- ^{1} Playing statistics correct to the end of the 2023 season.

Kate Bartlett (born 6 November 1999) is an Australian rules footballer playing for West Coast in the AFL Women's (AFLW). She played for the Peel Thunderbirds before she was drafted by the Western Bulldogs in the 2018 national draft. After a season at the club, including a final-round senior debut, Bartlett was traded to West Coast.

== Junior career ==
From Western Australia, Bartlett attributed her first experience of football to her older brother's influence. She played Auskick for the Safety Bay Stingers, a boys team. Bartlett paused her football in year 6 then restarted when she began high school at Kolbe Catholic College, Rockingham.

Bartlett also began to play for the Peel Thunderbirds in the West Australian Women's Football League (WAWFL), notching four matches in the 2016 season. She represented her state at the 2016 AFL Youth Girls National Championships and was named in the all-Australian side in the forward pocket. In 2017, she was among 33 players named in the inaugural AFLW Academy, which allowed her to attend various development camps. She made the all-Australian squad at the national under-18 competition in both 2017 and 2018. Ahead of the 2018 draft, Bartlett nominated to be recruited by Victorian clubs.

== AFLW career ==
Bartlett was drafted by the Western Bulldogs with pick 26 in the 2018 national draft, their third selection. While at the club, she wore number 20. She debuted in the final round of the 2019 season against Carlton at Whitten Oval. At the end of the season, Bartlett was traded to West Coast for pick 90 in the 2019 draft. At the end of the 2020 season, Bartlett was delisted by West Coast. In June 2022, Bartlett was promoted back to the senior list. In December 2023, Bartlett was delisted a second time by West Coast.
