= 2016 AFL Youth Girls National Championships =

AFL Youth Girls National Championships
- 2016

Tournament information
- Sport: Australian rules football
- Location: Melbourne
- Dates: 2 May–6 May
- Tournament format: Round-robin
- Venue(s): MCG; Olympic Park Oval; Punt Road Oval; Shepley Oval; Trevor Barker Oval
- Teams: 4 (pool A); 5 (pool B)

Final positions
- Champions: Vic Metro (pool A); NSW/ACT (pool B)

Tournament statistics
- Matches played: 16

The 2016 edition of the AFL Youth Girls National Championships was held from 2 to 6 May in Melbourne, Victoria. Nine teams competed in the round-robin tournament, divided into pool A: Queensland, Western Australia, Vic Country and Vic Metro; and pool B: the Northern Territory, South Australia, Tasmania, a combined New South Wales and Australian Capital Territory side (NSW/ACT) and the Indigenous Australian Woomeras.

A professional women's Australian rules football competition (AFL Women's (AFLW)) was to be inaugurated in 2017, creating a new incentive for performance in the championships. Several clubs who had received AFLW licences used the competition to scout potential players.

Vic Metro won pool A, completing an unbeaten tournament by holding Western Australia scoreless in the final played at the Melbourne Cricket Ground. NSW/ACT prevailed in pool B and was also undefeated in their group. Commenting on the pool A final, Herald Sun reporter Sam Edmund said "This is football as we remember it. No flooding, no pressing and players holding position. As good as the AFL has been this year, this was refreshing."

== Fixtures ==
	Pool A
Monday, 2 May 10:30am	Vic Metro 10.10 (70)	def.	Queensland 3.2 (20)	Olympic Park Oval	Report
Monday, 2 May 1:50pm	Western Australia 6.6 (42)	def.	Vic Country 5.3 (33)	Olympic Park Oval	Report
Tuesday, 3 May 10:40am	Western Australia 3.5 (23)	def. by	Vic Metro 10.7 (67)	Trevor Barker Oval	Report
Tuesday, 3 May 2:00pm	Queensland 5.4 (34)	def. by	Vic Country 6.7 (43)	Trevor Barker Oval	Report
Thursday, 5 May 10:40am	Queensland 7.6 (48)	def. by	Western Australia 7.7 (49)	Shepley Oval	Report
Thursday, 5 May 12:20pm	Vic Country 2.4 (16)	def. by	Vic Metro 6.9 (45)	Shepley Oval	Report
Friday, 6 May 12:10pm	Vic Country 6.6 (42)	def.	Queensland 5.4 (34)	Punt Road Oval	Report
Friday, 6 May 5:20pm	Vic Metro 14.11 (95)	def.	Western Australia 0.0 (0)	Melbourne Cricket Ground	Report

	Pool B
Monday, 2 May 12:10pm	South Australia 7.4 (46)	def.	Tasmania 2.4 (16)	Olympic Park Oval	Report
Monday, 2 May 3:30pm	Woomeras 0.0 (0)	def. by	NSW/ACT 17.5 (107)	Olympic Park Oval	Report
Tuesday, 3 May 9:00am	Tasmania 3.7 (25)	def. by	Northern Territory 3.11 (29)	Trevor Barker Oval	Report
Tuesday, 3 May 12:20pm	Woomeras 3.7 (25)	def. by	South Australia 8.6 (54)	Trevor Barker Oval	Report
Thursday, 5 May 9:00am	Woomeras 1.2 (8)	def. by	Tasmania 7.10 (52)	Shepley Oval	Report
Thursday, 5 May 2:00pm	NSW/ACT 8.12 (60)	def.	Northern Territory 0.6 (6)	Shepley Oval	Report
Friday, 6 May 10.30am	Woomeras 2.5 (17)	def. by	Northern Territory 9.10 (64)	Punt Road Oval	Report
Friday, 6 May 1:50pm	South Australia 1.1 (7)	def. by	NSW/ACT 10.12 (72)	Punt Road Oval	Report

== All-Australian team ==
An initial All-Australian squad was named in May. Most of the squad appeared in an all-star game in September that acted as a curtain-raiser for the Western Bulldogs–Melbourne Hampson-Hardeman Cup match. The final team was announced after the match. The selectors were Darren Flanigan, AFL Victoria female football manager and the chairman of the panel; Julia Price, former AFL Queensland female development manager; and footballers Lauren Arnell, Alicia Eva, Aasta O'Connor and Daisy Pearce.

2016 AFL Youth Girls' All-Australian team
B:	Rachel Ashley (WA)	Anne Hatchard (SA)	Arianna Clarke (Qld)
HB:	Georgia Walker (VC)	Tahlia Randall (Qld)	Ruby Blair (Qld)
C:	Lizzie Stokely (Tas)	Lily Mithen (VC)	Alyce Parker (NSW/ACT)
HF:	Jasmin Stewart (WA)	Isabel Huntington (VM)	Deanna Berry (VM)
F:	Brooke Struylaart (VM)	Isabella Ayre (VC)	Kate Bartlett (WA)
Foll:	Erin McKinnon (NSW/ACT)	Maddy Prespakis (VM)	Courtney Hodder (WA)
Int:	Reni Hicks (VC)	Sabreena Duffy (WA)	Charis Ulu Peniata (VM)
Int:	Shaleise Law (Qld)		
Coach:	Not named		
