= Georgia Gee =

Australian rules footballer

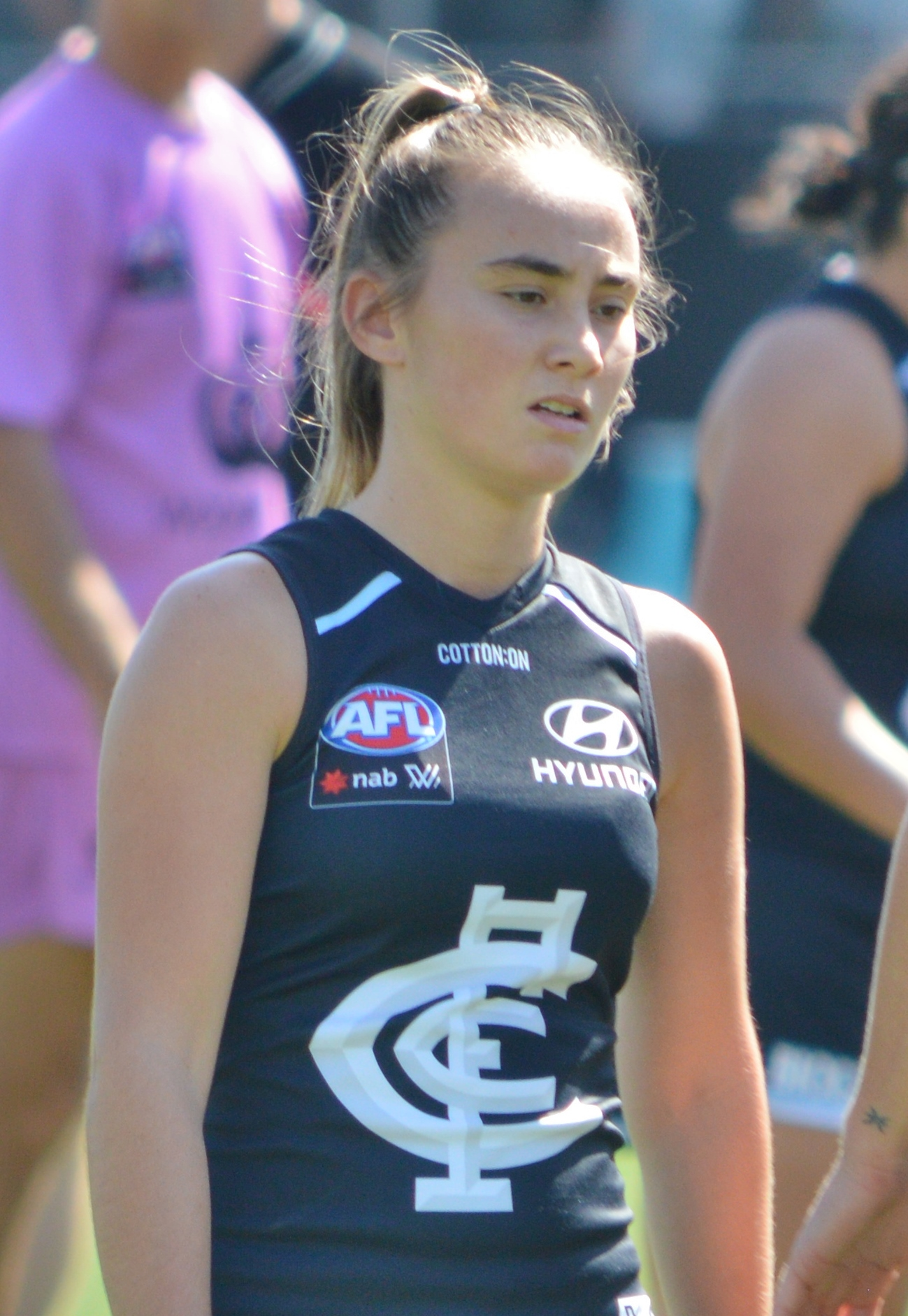
- Gee with Carlton in March 2019

Personal information
- Born: 28 October 1999 (age 27)
- Original team: Dandenong Stingrays (TAC Cup)
- Draft: No. 12, 2017 AFL Women's draft
- Debut: Round 1, 2018, Carlton vs. Collingwood, at Ikon Park
- Height: 160 cm (5 ft 3 in)
- Position: Midfielder

Club information
- Current club: Essendon
- Number: 2

Playing career^{1}
Years	Club	Games (Goals)
2018–2022	Carlton	40 (19)
S7 (2022)–	Essendon	17 (2)
Total		57 (21)
- ^{1} Playing statistics correct to the end of the 2023 season.

Career highlights
- AFL Women's Rising Star nominee: 2019; 22under22 team: 2020

Georgia Gee (born 28 October 1999) is an Australian rules footballer playing for the Essendon Football Club in the AFL Women's (AFLW). Gee was drafted by Carlton with their first selection and twelfth overall in the 2017 AFL Women's draft. She made her debut in the eight-point win against Collingwood at Ikon Park in the opening round of the 2018 season. In April 2022, it was confirmed Gee had committed to Essendon Football Club, commencing in AFL Women's season seven. Her grandfather, Brian Shinners, played VFL/AFL football with Richmond and Hawthorn in the 1960s and '70s.

== AFLW career ==
Carlton selected Gee with their first pick, number twelve overall, in the 2017 AFL Women's draft. She made her debut against Collingwood in round 1 and kicked her first career goal against Melbourne in round 6. She played eleven games for the club in 2018 — six in the AFLW and five in the VFLW.

In 2019, Gee nearly doubled her output from her first season and averaged more than 10 disposals per game. She put in a career-best performance in round 3 against Greater Western Sydney, recording 14 disposals, 6 tackles and a goal. After a 16-point win over Brisbane in round 6 in which she collected 12 disposals, she was the round nominee for the AFL Women's Rising Star award. In April 2019, she signed a two-year contract extension with the club. She played eleven games for Carlton in 2019 — eight in the AFLW and three in the VFLW.

In 2020, Gee finished the AFLW season with eight goals (converting at 100 per cent) in seven games, averaging 10 disposals a game. Her best performance came in round 3 against the Western Bulldogs, a game in which she kicked three goals and laid six tackles. She was voted as the final MVP of the Week for 2020 after kicking three goals, laying two tackles and collecting 12 touches and three inside 50s in a 29-point win over Brisbane. She was also voted into the inaugural AFLW 22under22 team and included in the 2020 AFL Women's All-Australian team of 40. In August 2020, she signed a one-year contract extension, committing to the club until at least the end of 2022.

== Statistics ==
Statistics are correct to the end of Round 3 of the 2021 season.

Legend
G	Goals	K	Kicks	D	Disposals	T	Tackles
B	Behinds	H	Handballs	M	Marks

Season	Team	No.	Games	Totals							Averages (per game)							Votes
Season	Team	No.	Games	G	B	K	H	D	M	T	G	B	K	H	D	M	T	Votes
2018	Carlton	19	6	1	2	28	6	34	3	15	0.2	0.3	4.7	1.0	5.7	0.5	2.5	0
2019	Carlton	19	8	1	0	60	26	86	12	27	0.1	0.0	7.5	3.3	10.8	1.5	3.4	0
2020	Carlton	19	7	8	0	38	33	71	8	25	1.1	0.0	5.4	4.7	10.1	1.1	3.6	0
2021	Carlton	19	3	1	2	21	13	34	5	12	0.3	0.5	7.0	4.3	11.3	1.7	4.0	
Career			24	11	4	147	78	225	28	79	0.5	0.2	6.1	3.3	9.4	1.2	3.3	0

== Honours ==
- AFL Women's Rising Star nominee: 2019
- 22under22 team: 2020
