= Sabreena McKinnon =

Australian rules footballer

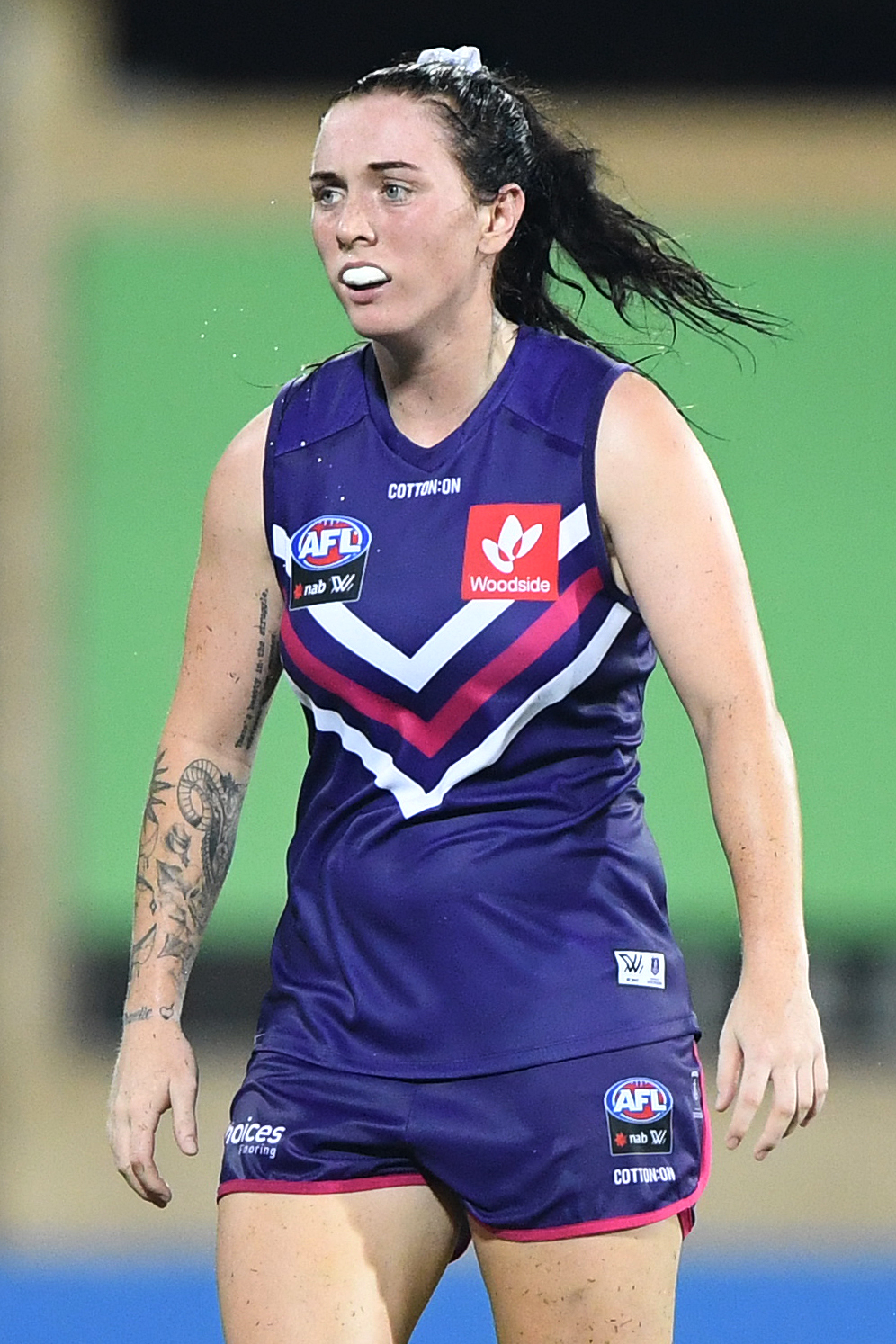
- McKinnon playing for Fremantle in January 2019

Personal information
- Born: 26 March 2000 (age 26)
- Original team: Peel Thunder (WAWFL)
- Draft: No. 17, 2018 AFL Women's draft
- Debut: Round 1, 2019, Fremantle vs. Melbourne, at Casey Fields
- Height: 165 cm (5 ft 5 in)
- Position: Utility

Playing career^{1}
Years	Club	Games (Goals)
2019–2022 (S6)	Fremantle	25 (30)
2022 (S7)	Melbourne	4 (4)
Total		29 (34)
- ^{1} Playing statistics correct to the end of 2022 season 7.

Career highlights
- 2019 AFL Women's Rising Star nomination, Round 2; Fremantle leading goalkicker: 2020 (12 goals); 22under22 team: 2020, 2021

Sabreena McKinnon (née Duffy, born 26 March 2000) is an Australian rules footballer who played for Fremantle and Melbourne in the AFL Women's (AFLW). She was known as Sabreena Duffy during her playing career, but legally changed her family name to her foster parents name in December 2022.

McKinnon was drafted by Fremantle with their second selection and seventeenth overall in the 2018 AFL Women's draft. She made her debut in the four point win against Melbourne at Casey Fields in the opening round of the 2019 season.

After kicking two goals in her second game, McKinnon was rewarded with a nomination in the AFL Women's Rising Star award.

In 2020 McKinnon played in every game of Fremantle's undefeated season, kicking a team record 12 goals and was named in the 40-person AFL Women's All-Australian team squad.

McKinnon withdrew from 2022 season 6 due to wanting to focus on her career with the Department of Justice. At the end of the season, Fremantle delisted her. A few weeks later, she was signed by Melbourne as a free agent. She made only four appearances in 2022 season 7 due to a foot injury and was delisted by Melbourne in December 2022.
