= Wayne Siekman =

Australian rules football coach (born 1983)

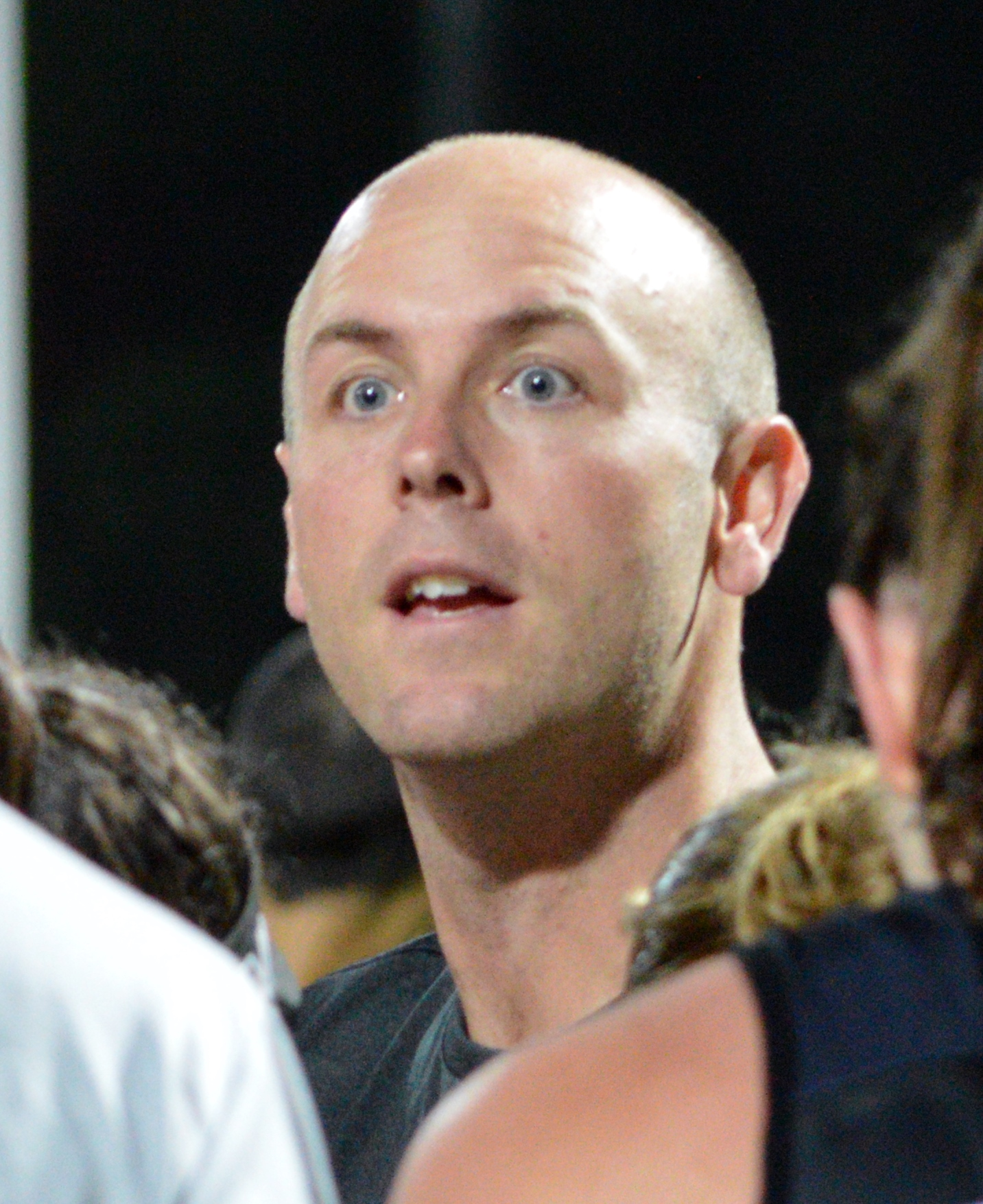
- Siekman in January 2018

Personal information
- Born: 1983 (age 42–43)

Coaching career^{3}
Years	Club	Games (W–L–D)
2017–2019	Collingwood (W)	21 (7–14–0)
Total		21 (7–14–0)
- ^{3} Coaching statistics correct as of 2019.

Wayne Siekman is an Australian rules football coach who was the head coach of the Collingwood Football Club in the AFL Women's competition (AFLW) between 2017 and 2019.

== Coaching career ==
=== Beginnings ===
Siekman's coaching career began in earnest with two years as the Chelsea Football Club's Under 18 coach.

His first major coaching appointment came when he joined the Dandenong Stingrays as a development coach in 2006. He served at the TAC Cup side in multiple roles over the next decade including later as a senior assistant coach.

In addition to his role at the Stingrays, Siekman served as head coach of the Victorian Metro side at Youth Girls Championships between 2014 and 2016. He coached the side to national titles in both 2015 and 2016.

He also briefly worked as an assistant development coach for Collingwood's VFL team in 2008.

=== AFL Women's ===
Siekman was appointed as the inaugural head coach of Collingwood's AFL Women's side in July 2016.

He coached the side to three wins from seven matches in the league's inaugural season in 2017, followed by three wins in 2018, and only one win in 2019. Siekman was sacked by Collingwood after coaching the side to a wooden spoon and just one win in the 2019 season.

== Coaching statistics ==
Statistics are correct to the end of the 2019 season

Legend
W	Wins	L	Losses	D	Draws	W%	Winning percentage	LP	Ladder position	LT	League teams

Season	Team	Games	W	L	D	W %	LP	LT
2017	Collingwood	7	3	4	0	42.9%	5	8
2018	Collingwood	7	3	4	0	42.9%	5	8
2019	Collingwood	7	1	6	0	14.2%	5 (Conf. B)	10 (5 each conf.)
Career totals		21	7	14	0	33.3%		
