= 2019 AFL Women's season =

Third season of the AFL Women's (AFLW) competition

Overview
- Date: 2 February – 31 March 2019
- Teams: 10
- Premiers: Adelaide; 2nd premiership
- Runners-up: Carlton; 1st runners-up result
- Best and fairest: Erin Phillips (Adelaide); 19 votes
- Leading goalkicker: Stevie-Lee Thompson (Adelaide); 13 goals

Attendance
- Matches played: 38
- Total attendance: 251,792 (6,626 per match)
- Highest (H&A): 18,429 (round 1, Geelong v Collingwood)
- Highest (finals): 53,034 (grand final, Adelaide v Carlton)

The 2019 AFL Women's season was the third season of the AFL Women's (AFLW) competition, the highest-level senior women's Australian rules football competition in Australia. The season featured ten clubs and ran from 2 February to 31 March, comprising a seven-round home-and-away season followed by a two-week finals series featuring the top two clubs from each conference. Australian Football League (AFL) clubs Geelong and North Melbourne featured for the first time in 2019.

Adelaide won the premiership, defeating Carlton by 45 points in the 2019 AFL Women's Grand Final; it was Adelaide's second AFL Women's premiership. Adelaide's Erin Phillips won her second AFL Women's best and fairest award as the league's best and fairest player, and teammate Stevie-Lee Thompson won the AFL Women's leading goalkicker award as the league's leading goalkicker.

== Reforms ==
=== New teams ===
Two new teams, Geelong and North Melbourne, joined the competition, bringing the total number of teams to ten. The North Melbourne team has a strong Tasmanian focus; some players were based in Tasmania and some home games were held in the state. The introduction of the new teams was the first stage of a two-year expansion that took the league to fourteen teams for the 2020 season.

Expansion of AFL Women's
| Club | Entry in 2017 | | Entry in 2019/20 | | | Entry in 2022 (S7) | |
| Club | Placed bid | Granted entry | Placed bid | Granted entry | | Placed bid | Granted entry |
| Club | Placed bid | Granted entry | Placed bid | 2019 | 2020 | Placed bid | Granted entry |
|---|---|---|---|---|---|---|---|
| Adelaide | Yes | Yes | —N/a | | | | |
| Brisbane | Yes | Yes | —N/a | | | | |
| Carlton | Yes | Yes | —N/a | | | | |
| Collingwood | Yes | Yes | —N/a | | | | |
| Essendon | No | —N/a | Yes | No | No | Yes | Yes |
| Fremantle | Yes | Yes | —N/a | | | | |
| Geelong | Yes | No | Yes | Yes | —N/a | | |
| Gold Coast | No | —N/a | Yes | No | Yes | —N/a | |
| Greater Western Sydney | Yes | Yes | —N/a | | | | |
| Hawthorn | No | —N/a | Yes | No | No | Yes | Yes |
| Melbourne | Yes | Yes | —N/a | | | | |
| North Melbourne | Yes | No | Yes | Yes | —N/a | | |
| Port Adelaide | No | —N/a | No | —N/a | —N/a | Yes | Yes |
| Richmond | Yes | No | Yes | No | Yes | —N/a | |
| St Kilda | Yes | No | Yes | No | Yes | —N/a | |
| Sydney | No | —N/a | No | —N/a | —N/a | Yes | Yes |
| West Coast | Yes | No | Yes | No | Yes | —N/a | |
| Western Bulldogs | Yes | Yes | —N/a | | | | |

=== Conferences ===
Despite the introduction of new teams, the league retained a seven-round home-and-away season. This was achieved by splitting the competition into two conferences. Each team play four games against their fellow conference members and three "cross-over" matches against teams from the other conference. Conference membership was based on the final ladder positions of the 2018 season.

The finals series was expanded to include preliminary finals for the first time; the two teams who finish the highest in each conference at the end of the home-and-away season qualified for the preliminary finals. The winners of these games played in the AFL Women's Grand Final. The make-up of the conferences, along with the fixture, was released in October 2018.

The conference system proved controversial as the teams in Conference A consistently outplayed the teams on Conference B, resulting in the first, second, fifth and sixth best overall teams making the finals. Due to the conference system, as of 2024, this remains the only season where North Melbourne did not make the finals (despite a 5–2 record).

Pool A
| Team | Stadium(s) | Capacity |
|---|---|---|
| Western Bulldogs | Whitten Oval; Marvel Stadium | 12,000; 56,347 |
| Melbourne | Casey Fields | 12,000 |
| Adelaide | Norwood Oval; TIO Stadium; Unley Oval | 22,000; 12,500; 10,000 |
| Fremantle | Fremantle Oval | 17,500 |
| North Melbourne | North Hobart Oval; UTAS Stadium; Avalon Airport Oval | 18,000; 21,000; 10,000 |

Pool B
| Team | Stadium(s) | Capacity |
|---|---|---|
| Brisbane | MBC Sports Complex; Hickey Park | 8,000; 4,000 |
| Greater Western Sydney | Drummoyne Oval; Blacktown ISP Oval; UNSW Canberra Oval | 6,000; 10,000; 16,000 |
| Collingwood | Victoria Park; Morwell Reserve; Marvel Stadium | 15,000; 12,000; 56,347 |
| Carlton | Ikon Park | 24,568 |
| Geelong | GMHBA Stadium | 36,000 |

=== Rule changes ===
There were 11 rule changes brought in for the 2019 AFLW season (three AFLW specific).

- Boundary throw ins brought in by 10m (AFLW only)
- Last touch rule only applies outside of the 50s (AFLW only)
- Runners allowed on the field during live play (AFLW only)
- 5-6-5 formation mandated at centre bounces
- The woman on the mark must stand further back after kick ins after a behind (from 5m to 10m), and the player doesn't need to kick to herself before playing on
- After defenders have a free kick within nine metres of their goal, the woman on the mark stands in line with the top of the goal square
- Players can't set up behind the umpire at centre bounces
- Play on is allowed for 50m penalties
- Players can kick across their body after taking a mark after the siren.
- A player can place her hands on the back of her opponent to protect marking space (see Push in the back)
- A ruck who takes direct possession of the ball from a bounce, throw-up or boundary throw-in will no longer be regarded as having had prior opportunity.

== Home-and-away season ==
The full fixture and make-up of the conferences was released on 26 October 2018.

- All starting times are local.

=== Round 1 ===
| | Round 1 |
| Saturday, 2 February (6:40 pm) | Geelong 3.6 (24) | def. | Collingwood 3.5 (23) | GMHBA Stadium (crowd: 18,429) | Report |
| Saturday, 2 February (8:10 pm) | Adelaide 1.11 (17) | def. by | Western Bulldogs 2.6 (18) | Norwood Oval (crowd: 7,830) | Report |
| Sunday, 3 February (1:05 pm) | North Melbourne 7.10 (52) | def. | Carlton 2.4 (16) | North Hobart Oval (crowd: 4,896) | Report |
| Sunday, 3 February (3:05 pm) | Melbourne 8.7 (55) | def. by | Fremantle 9.5 (59) | Casey Fields (crowd: 1,800) | Report |
| Sunday, 3 February (4:05 pm) | Brisbane 4.5 (29) | def. | Greater Western Sydney 4.3 (27) | Moreton Bay Sports Complex (crowd: 2,850) | Report |

=== Round 2 ===
| | Round 2 |
| Friday, 8 February (7:15 pm) | Greater Western Sydney 2.11 (23) | def. by | North Melbourne 7.6 (48) | Drummoyne Oval (crowd: 1,365) | Report |
| Saturday, 9 February (4:45 pm) | Collingwood 1.3 (9) | def. by | Melbourne 3.8 (26) | Victoria Park (crowd: 7,228) | Report |
| Saturday, 9 February (7:15 pm) | Western Bulldogs 5.4 (34) | def. | Geelong 2.4 (16) | VU Whitten Oval (crowd: 8,612) | Report |
| Sunday, 10 February (4:05 pm) | Carlton 7.2 (44) | def. by | Adelaide 9.3 (57) | Ikon Park (crowd: 3,150) | Report |
| Sunday, 10 February (3:05 pm) | Fremantle 10.7 (67) | def. | Brisbane 6.4 (40) | Fremantle Oval (crowd: 6,007) | Report |

=== Round 3 ===
| | Round 3 |
| Friday, 15 February (7:15 pm) | North Melbourne 8.5 (53) | def. | Western Bulldogs 3.4 (22) | University of Tasmania Stadium (crowd: 3,123) | Report |
| Saturday, 16 February (4:45 pm) | Greater Western Sydney 5.6 (36) | def. by | Carlton 10.5 (65) | Blacktown ISP Oval (crowd: 3,823) | Report |
| Saturday, 16 February (4:15 pm) | Fremantle 7.9 (51) | def. | Collingwood 2.6 (18) | Fremantle Oval (crowd: 5,443) | Report |
| Sunday, 17 February (2:05 pm) | Adelaide 10.6 (66) | def. | Geelong 6.1 (37) | Norwood Oval (crowd: 4,433) | Report |
| Sunday, 17 February (3:35 pm) | Brisbane 3.3 (21) | def. by | Melbourne 9.6 (60) | Hickey Park (crowd: 5,453) | Report |

=== Round 4 ===
| | Round 4 |
| Saturday, 23 February (4:45 pm) | Geelong 2.7 (19) | def. | Carlton 1.8 (14) | GMHBA Stadium (crowd: 7,060) | Report |
| Saturday, 23 February (7:15 pm) | Western Bulldogs 2.5 (17) | def. by | Brisbane 7.7 (49) | VU Whitten Oval (crowd: 6,541) | Report |
| Saturday, 23 February (8:05 pm) | Adelaide 9.11 (65) | def. | Fremantle 3.5 (23) | TIO Stadium (crowd: 1,734) | Report |
| Sunday, 24 February (2:05 pm) | Collingwood 4.3 (27) | def. by | Greater Western Sydney 5.6 (36) | Morwell Recreation Reserve (crowd: 1,743) | Report |
| Sunday, 24 February (4:05 pm) | Melbourne 5.4 (34) | def. by | North Melbourne 6.2 (38) | Casey Fields (crowd: 4,227) | Report |

=== Round 5 ===
| | Round 5 |
| Saturday, 2 March (3:45 pm) | Brisbane 1.2 (8) | def. by | Geelong 5.5 (35) | Moreton Bay Central Sports Complex (crowd: 2,800) | Report |
| Saturday, 2 March (7:15 pm) | Carlton 4.10 (34) | def. | Collingwood 4.5 (29) | Ikon Park (crowd: 3,215) | Report |
| Sunday, 3 March (2:05 pm) | Greater Western Sydney 2.6 (18) | def. by | Melbourne 8.9 (57) | Blacktown ISP Oval (crowd: 1,576) | Report |
| Sunday, 3 March (4:05 pm) | North Melbourne 4.5 (29) | def. by | Adelaide 10.4 (64) | Avalon Airport Oval (crowd: 2,107) | Report |
| Sunday, 3 March (3:05 pm) | Fremantle 8.4 (52) | def. | Western Bulldogs 5.4 (34) | Fremantle Oval (crowd: 4,785) | Report |

=== Round 6 ===
| | Round 6 |
| Saturday, 9 March (2:35 pm) | Geelong 2.1 (13) | def. by | Fremantle 6.13 (49) | GMHBA Stadium (crowd: 4,125) | Report |
| Saturday, 9 March (4:45 pm) | Collingwood 5.1 (31) | def. by | North Melbourne 7.11 (53) | Marvel Stadium (crowd: 10,612) | Report |
| Saturday, 9 March (7:15 pm) | Western Bulldogs 6.2 (38) | def. by | Melbourne 5.9 (39) | Marvel Stadium (crowd: 10,612) | Report |
| Sunday, 10 March (1:35 pm) | Adelaide 9.5 (59) | def. | Greater Western Sydney 4.3 (27) | Unley Oval (crowd: 7,725) | Report |
| Sunday, 10 March (4:05 pm) | Carlton 6.7 (43) | def. | Brisbane 4.3 (27) | Ikon Park (crowd: 2,900) | Report |

=== Round 7 ===
| | Round 7 |
| Friday, 15 March (7:15 pm) | Greater Western Sydney 6.5 (41) | def. | Geelong 1.4 (10) | UNSW Canberra Oval (crowd: 4,524) | Report |
| Saturday, 16 March (4:45 pm) | Melbourne 1.2 (8) | def. by | Adelaide 10.8 (68) | Casey Fields (crowd: 2,239) | Report |
| Saturday, 16 March (4:15 pm) | Fremantle 7.10 (52) | def. | North Melbourne 4.1 (25) | Fremantle Oval (crowd: 6,386) | Report |
| Sunday, 17 March (2:05 pm) | Collingwood 3.7 (25) | def. | Brisbane 2.7 (19) | Victoria Park (crowd: 2,030) | Report |
| Sunday, 17 March (4:05 pm) | Western Bulldogs 5.8 (38) | def. by | Carlton 6.5 (41) | VU Whitten Oval (crowd: 9,609) | Report |

== Ladders ==
Conference A
| Pos | Team | Pld | W | L | D | PF | PA | PP | Pts | Qualification |
|---|---|---|---|---|---|---|---|---|---|---|
| 1 | Adelaide | 7 | 6 | 1 | 0 | 396 | 186 | 212.9 | 24 | Preliminary finals |
| 2 | Fremantle | 7 | 6 | 1 | 0 | 353 | 250 | 141.2 | 24 | Preliminary finals |
| 3 | North Melbourne | 7 | 5 | 2 | 0 | 298 | 242 | 123.1 | 20 | |
| 4 | Melbourne | 7 | 4 | 3 | 0 | 279 | 251 | 111.2 | 16 | |
| 5 | Western Bulldogs | 7 | 2 | 5 | 0 | 201 | 267 | 75.3 | 8 | |

Source: womens.afl
Rules for classification: 1) points; 2) percentage; 3) number of points for.

Conference B
| Pos | Team | Pld | W | L | D | PF | PA | PP | Pts | Qualification |
|---|---|---|---|---|---|---|---|---|---|---|
| 1 | Carlton | 7 | 4 | 3 | 0 | 257 | 258 | 99.6 | 16 | Preliminary finals |
| 2 | Geelong | 7 | 3 | 4 | 0 | 154 | 235 | 65.5 | 12 | Preliminary finals |
| 3 | Greater Western Sydney | 7 | 2 | 5 | 0 | 208 | 295 | 70.5 | 8 | |
| 4 | Brisbane | 7 | 2 | 5 | 0 | 193 | 274 | 70.4 | 8 | |
| 5 | Collingwood | 7 | 1 | 6 | 0 | 162 | 243 | 66.7 | 4 | |

Source: womens.afl
Rules for classification: 1) points; 2) percentage; 3) number of points for.

== Progression by round ==
- Numbers highlighted in green indicates the team finished the round inside the top 2.

=== Conference A ===
| | Team | 1 | 2 | 3 | 4 | 5 | 6 | 7 |
|---|---|---|---|---|---|---|---|---|
| 1 | Adelaide | 0 | 4 | 8 | 12 | 16 | 20 | 24 |
| 2 | Fremantle | 4 | 8 | 12 | 12 | 16 | 20 | 24 |
| 3 | North Melbourne | 4 | 8 | 12 | 16 | 16 | 20 | 20 |
| 4 | Melbourne | 0 | 4 | 8 | 8 | 12 | 16 | 16 |
| 5 | Western Bulldogs | 4 | 8 | 8 | 8 | 8 | 8 | 8 |

=== Conference B ===
| | Team | 1 | 2 | 3 | 4 | 5 | 6 | 7 |
|---|---|---|---|---|---|---|---|---|
| 1 | Carlton | 0 | 0 | 4 | 4 | 8 | 12 | 16 |
| 2 | Geelong | 4 | 4 | 4 | 8 | 12 | 12 | 12 |
| 3 | Greater Western Sydney | 0 | 0 | 0 | 4 | 4 | 4 | 8 |
| 4 | Brisbane | 4 | 4 | 4 | 8 | 8 | 8 | 8 |
| 5 | Collingwood | 0 | 0 | 0 | 0 | 0 | 0 | 4 |

== Finals series ==
Preliminary finals
March 24, Adelaide Oval
Adelaide | 11.7 (73)
Geelong | 1.1 (7)
March 23, Ikon Park
Carlton | 9.10 (64)
Fremantle | 4.4 (28)

Grand final
March 31, Adelaide Oval
Adelaide | 10.3 (63)
Carlton | 2.6 (18)

=== Preliminary finals ===
| | Preliminary finals |
| Saturday, 23 March (2.45 pm) | Carlton 9.10 (64) | def. | Fremantle 4.4 (28) | Ikon Park (crowd: 7,146) | Report |
| Sunday, 24 March (12.40 pm) | Adelaide 11.7 (73) | def. | Geelong 1.1 (7) | Adelaide Oval (crowd: 13,429) | Report |

=== Grand final ===
| | Grand final |
| Sunday, 31 March (12:30 pm) | Adelaide 10.3 (63) | def. | Carlton 2.6 (18) | Adelaide Oval (crowd: 53,034) | Report |

== Win–loss table ==
| + | Win | Qualified for finals |
| − | Loss | Eliminated |

| Team | 1 | 2 | 3 | 4 | 5 | 6 | 7 | PF | GF | Ladder |
|---|---|---|---|---|---|---|---|---|---|---|
| Adelaide | WB; 1 | Car; 13 | Gee; 29 | Fre; 42 | NM; 35 | GWS; 32 | Melb; 60 | Gee; 66 | Car; 45 | A1 |
| Brisbane | GWS; 2 | Fre; 27 | Melb; 39 | WB; 32 | Gee; 27 | Carl; 16 | Coll; 6 | X | X | B4 |
| Carlton | NM; 36 | Adel; 13 | GWS; 29 | Geel; 5 | Coll; 5 | BL; 16 | WB; 3 | Fre; 36 | Ade; 45 | B1 |
| Collingwood | Geel; 1 | Melb; 17 | Fre; 33 | GWS; 9 | Carl; 5 | NM; 22 | BL; 6 | X | X | B5 |
| Fremantle | Melb; 4 | BL; 27 | Coll; 33 | Adel; 42 | WB; 18 | Gee; 36 | NM; 27 | Carl; 36 | X | A2 |
| Geelong | Coll; 1 | WB; 18 | Adel; 29 | Carl; 5 | BL; 27 | Fre; 36 | GWS; 31 | Adel; 66 | X | B2 |
| Greater Western Sydney | BL; 2 | NM; 25 | Carl; 29 | Coll; 9 | Melb; 39 | Adel; 32 | Geel; 31 | X | X | B3 |
| Melbourne | Fre; 4 | Col; 17 | BL; 39 | NM; 4 | GWS; 39 | WB; 1 | Adel; 60 | X | X | A4 |
| North Melbourne | Carl; 36 | GWS; 25 | WB; 31 | Melb; 4 | Adel; 35 | Coll; 22 | Fre; 27 | X | X | A3 |
| Western Bulldogs | Adel; 1 | Geel; 18 | NM; 31 | BL; 32 | Fre; 18 | Melb; 1 | Carl; 3 | X | X | A5 |

== Attendances ==
=== By club ===
2019 AFL Women's attendances
| Club | Total | Games | Avg. per game | Home total | Home games | Home avg. |
|---|---|---|---|---|---|---|
| Adelaide | 29,218 | 7 | 4,174 | 21,722 | 4 | 5,431 |
| Brisbane | 24,555 | 6 | 4,093 | 7,077 | 2 | 3,539 |
| Carlton | 34,653 | 7 | 4,950 | 9,265 | 3 | 3,088 |
| Collingwood | 48,700 | 7 | 6,957 | 21,613 | 4 | 5,403 |
| Fremantle | 30,280 | 7 | 4,326 | 22,621 | 4 | 5,655 |
| Geelong | 47,183 | 6 | 7,864 | 29,614 | 3 | 9,871 |
| Greater Western Sydney | 23,147 | 7 | 3,307 | 11,279 | 4 | 2,820 |
| Melbourne | 31,900 | 7 | 4,557 | 8,266 | 3 | 2,755 |
| North Melbourne | 32,716 | 7 | 4,674 | 10,126 | 3 | 3,375 |
| Western Bulldogs | 51,112 | 7 | 7,302 | 35,374 | 4 | 8,844 |

=== By ground ===
2019 ground attendances
| Ground | Total | Games | Avg. per game |
|---|---|---|---|
| Avalon Airport Stadium | 2,107 | 1 | 2,107 |
| Blacktown ISP Oval | 5,390 | 2 | 2,695 |
| Casey Fields | 8,266 | 3 | 2,755 |
| Drummoyne Oval | 1,365 | 1 | 1,365 |
| Fremantle Oval | 22,621 | 4 | 5,655 |
| Hickey Park | 4,227 | 1 | 4,227 |
| GMHBA Stadium | 29,614 | 3 | 9,871 |
| Ikon Park | 9,265 | 3 | 3,088 |
| Marvel Stadium | 10,612 | 1 | 10,612 |
| Moreton Bay Sports Complex | 2,850 | 1 | 2,850 |
| Morwell Recreation Reserve | 1,743 | 1 | 1,743 |
| North Hobart Oval | 4,896 | 1 | 4,896 |
| Norwood Oval | 12,263 | 2 | 6,132 |
| TIO Stadium | 1,734 | 1 | 1,734 |
| Unley Oval | 7,725 | 1 | 7,725 |
| UNSW Canberra Oval | 4,524 | 1 | 4,524 |
| University of Tasmania Stadium | 3,123 | 1 | 3,123 |
| Victoria Park | 9,258 | 2 | 4,629 |
| VU Whitten Oval | 27,762 | 3 | 8,254 |

== Awards ==
- The league best and fairest was awarded to Erin Phillips.
- The leading goalkicker was awarded to Stevie-Lee Thompson of Adelaide, who kicked thirteen goals during the home and away season.
- The Rising Star was awarded to Maddy Prespakis.
- The best on ground in the AFL Women's Grand Final was awarded to Erin Phillips.
- The goal of the year was awarded to Ashley Sharp.
- The mark of the year was awarded to Tayla Harris.
- AFLW Players Association awards
  - The most valuable player was awarded to Erin Phillips.
  - The most courageous player was awarded to Chelsea Randall.
  - The best captain was awarded to Brianna Davey.
  - The best first year player was awarded to Maddy Prespakis.
- The AFLW Coaches Association champion player of the year was awarded to Erin Phillips.
- Erin Phillips was named the captain of the 2019 AFL Women's All-Australian team. The premiers Adelaide had five players selected, with nine of the league's 10 clubs represented in the final team by at least one player.
- Collingwood were the lowest ranked team overall, and thus could be said to have "won" the wooden spoon, though this is a contestable claim given the use of conferences.

=== Best and fairest ===
| Club | Award name | Player | Ref. |
|---|---|---|---|
| Adelaide | Club Champion | Erin Phillips | |
| Brisbane | Best and fairest | Ally Anderson | |
| Carlton | Best and fairest | Brianna Davey | |
| Carlton | Best and fairest | Maddy Prespakis | |
| Collingwood | Best and fairest | Jaimee Lambert | |
| Fremantle | Fairest and best | Kiara Bowers | |
| Geelong | Best and fairest | Meg McDonald | |
| Greater Western Sydney | Gabrielle Trainor Medal | Rebecca Beeson | |
| Melbourne | Best and fairest | Karen Paxman | |
| North Melbourne | Best and fairest | Jenna Bruton | |
| Western Bulldogs | Best and fairest | Monique Conti | |

=== AFLW leading goalkicker ===
- Numbers highlighted in blue indicates the player led the season's goal kicking tally at the end of that round.

| | Player | 1 | 2 | 3 | 4 | 5 | 6 | 7 | Total |
| 1 | Stevie-Lee Thompson | 0 | 4_{4} | 1_{5} | 2_{7} | 2_{9} | 3_{12} | 1_{13} | 13 |
| 2 | Erin Phillips | 0 | 1_{1} | 3_{4} | 2_{6} | 2_{8} | 1_{9} | 0_{9} | 9 |
| 3 | Emma King | 2 | 2_{4} | 0_{4} | 3_{7} | 1_{8} | 0_{8} | 0_{8} | 8 |
| 3 | Mo Hope | 1 | 0_{1} | 1_{2} | 2_{4} | 1_{5} | 1_{6} | 2_{8} | 8 |
| 3 | Ashley Sharp | 2 | 2_{4} | 0_{4} | 0_{4} | 0_{4} | 2_{6} | 2_{8} | 8 |
| 3 | Tegan Cunningham | 1 | 0_{1} | 1_{2} | 1_{3} | 3_{6} | 2_{8} | 0_{8} | 8 |
| 3 | Gemma Houghton | 2 | 1_{3} | 0_{3} | 0_{3} | 2_{5} | 2_{7} | 1_{7} | 8 |
| 3 | Jess Wuetschner | 3 | 2_{5} | 0_{5} | 1_{6} | 0_{6} | 1_{7} | 1_{8} | 8 |
| 9 | Eloise Jones | 0 | 2_{2} | 1_{3} | 2_{5} | 1_{6} | 1_{7} | 0_{7} | 7 |
| 9 | Kellie Gibson | 0 | 0_{0} | 2_{2} | 1_{3} | 3_{6} | 0_{6} | 1_{7} | 7 |
| 9 | Danielle Ponter | 0 | 0_{0} | 0_{0} | 2_{2} | 2_{4} | 2_{6} | 1_{6} | 7 |
| 9 | Sabreena Duffy | 1 | 2_{3} | 0_{3} | 0_{3} | 2_{5} | 0_{5} | 2_{7} | 7 |
| 9 | Christina Bernardi | 1 | 0_{1} | 2_{3} | 0_{3} | 1_{4} | 1_{5} | 2_{7} | 7 |
| 9 | Tayla Harris | 0 | 0_{0} | 3_{3} | 0_{3} | 1_{4} | 2_{6} | 1_{7} | 7 |

Source: https://www.afl.com.au/womens/matches/stats

== Coach changes ==
| Club | Outgoing coach | Manner of departure | Date of vacancy | Incoming coach | Date of appointment |
|---|---|---|---|---|---|
| North Melbourne | Inaugural coach | | | Scott Gowans | 24 October 2017 |
| Geelong | Inaugural coach | | | Paul Hood | 23 February 2018 |
| Collingwood | Wayne Siekman | Sacked | 4 April 2019 | Stephen Symonds | 4 June 2019 |
| Western Bulldogs | Paul Groves | Resigned | 17 June 2019 | Nathan Burke | 19 September 2019 |

== Club leadership ==
| Club | Coach | Captain(s) | Vice-captain(s) | Leadership group | Ref |
|---|---|---|---|---|---|
| Adelaide | Matthew Clarke | Erin Phillips, Chelsea Randall | Courtney Cramey, Ange Foley | | |
| Brisbane | Craig Starcevich | Leah Kaslar | Kate Lutkins, Sam Virgo, Emma Zielke | | |
| Carlton | Daniel Harford | Brianna Davey | Katie Loynes | Shae Audley, Kerryn Harrington, Sarah Hosking, Darcy Vescio | |
| Collingwood | Wayne Siekman | Steph Chiocci | Ashleigh Brazill, Emma Grant | Brittany Bonnici, Sarah D'Arcy, Chloe Molloy | |
| Fremantle | Trent Cooper | Kara Donnellan | | Ebony Antonio, Kiara Bowers, Evangeline Gooch, Gabby O'Sullivan | |
| Geelong | Paul Hood | Melissa Hickey | Rebecca Goring | Richelle Cranston, Renee Garing, Aasta O'Connor, Anna Teague | |
| Greater Western Sydney | Alan McConnell | Amanda Farrugia | Alicia Eva | Christina Bernardi, Jessica Dal Pos, Tanya Hetherington, Emma Swanson | |
| Melbourne | Mick Stinear | Elise O'Dea; Shelley Scott | Sarah Lampard, Karen Paxman | | |
| North Melbourne | Scott Gowans | Emma Kearney | Brittany Gibson, Jess Duffin | Kaitlyn Ashmore, Emma King | |
| Western Bulldogs | Paul Groves | Ellie Blackburn, Katie Brennan | | Nicole Callinan, Isabel Huntington, Kirsty Lamb, Hannah Scott | |

== See also ==
- 2018 AFL Women's draft
