= 2019 Geelong Football Club women's season =

Football club women's season

Geelong Football Club
2019 season
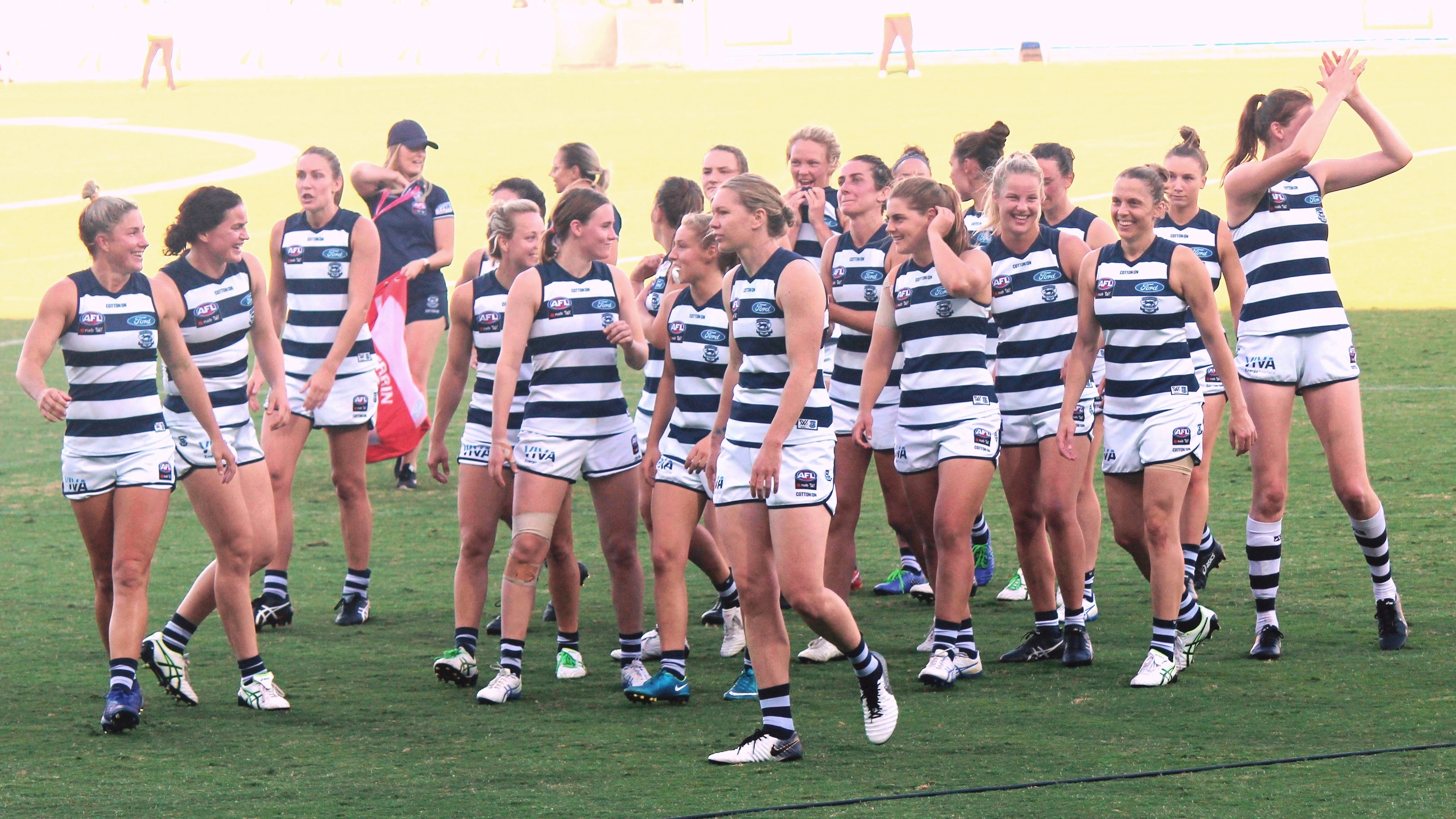
- Geelong players after a win in round four
- President: Colin Carter
- Coach: Paul Hood (1st season)
- Captain(s): Melissa Hickey (1st season)
- Home ground: GMHBA Stadium
- AFLW: 2nd (Conference B)
- Finals series: Preliminary finals
- Best and fairest: Meg McDonald
- Leading goalkicker: Mia-Rae Clifford (6)
- Highest home attendance: 18,429 vs. Collingwood (round 1)
- Lowest home attendance: 4,125 vs. Fremantle (round 6)

The 2019 season was Geelong Football Club's first in the AFL Women's (AFLW) competition. Geelong (known as the Cats) joined the league as an expansion club alongside North Melbourne, having initially been denied entry into the competition's first season in 2017. Paul Hood was the club's inaugural senior coach, and Melissa Hickey was appointed club captain.

In preparation for the club's entry into the league, Geelong were provided with a range of recruitment concessions, including early access to existing clubs' players prior to the league's signing period, and additional selections in the 2018 AFL Women's draft. Nina Morrison was selected by the Cats with the first overall selection in the draft.

Geelong began the regular season against Collingwood at GMHBA Stadium on 2 February, wearing the founding members guernsey that had all the members names on it, they finished the regular season with a 3–4 win–loss record, and qualified for the 2019 finals series. Geelong was subsequently defeated in a preliminary final against Adelaide by 66 points, eliminating them before the 2019 AFL Women's Grand Final.

Meg McDonald won Geelong's best and fairest award with 182 votes, finishing ahead of Olivia Purcell, who came in second place with 168 votes. McDonald was also the Cats' sole selection in the 2019 AFL Women's All-Australian team. Mia-Rae Clifford was the club's leading goalkicker, scoring six goals.

== Background ==
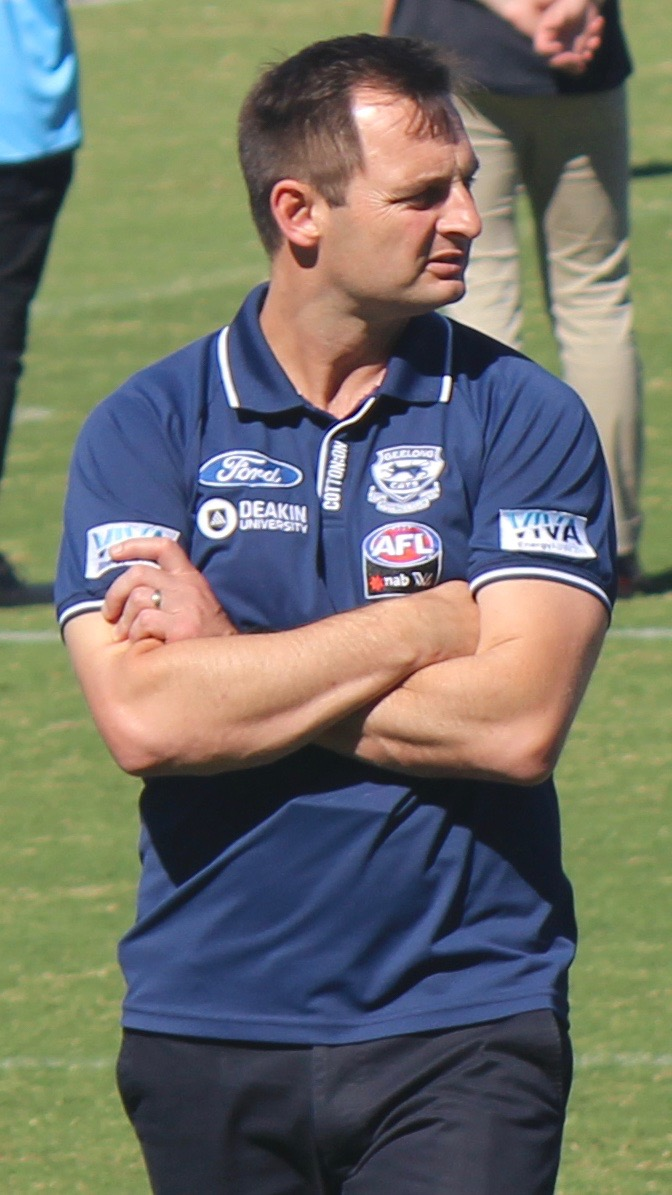
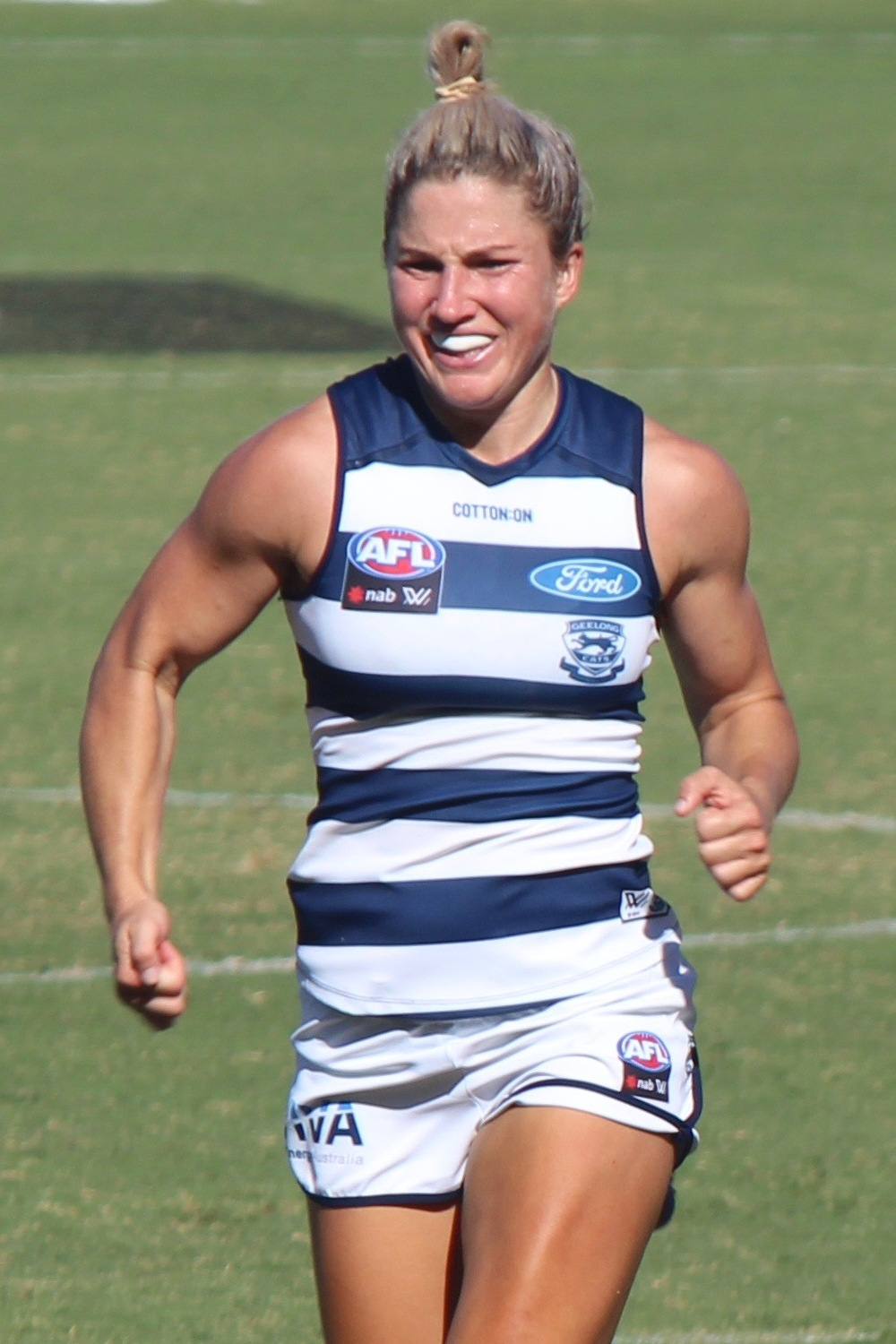
Paul Hood (coach) and Melissa Hickey (captain)

The first season of the AFL Women's (AFLW) league was held in 2017, and consisted of eight teams operated by associated clubs from the Australian Football League (AFL). Although Geelong Football Club's application to join the AFLW's inaugural season was unsuccessful, it was later confirmed in September 2017 that it would join the league as an expansion club from the 2019 season, alongside North Melbourne.

Paul Hood was appointed the club's inaugural AFLW coach in February 2018, having previously coached Geelong's VFL Women's (VFLW) team since its inception in 2016. Natalie Wood replaced Hood as the VFLW coach, and also secured a role as an assistant coach for the AFLW team. The coaching team was finalised in November 2018, with Geelong AFL players Tom Stewart and Aaron Black joining Wood as assistant coaches, and Oscar Owens and David Morgan named as development coaches.

Melissa Hickey was announced as the Cats' inaugural AFLW captain in December 2018. Rebecca Goring, who had captained the VFLW side since 2017, was awarded the role of vice-captain. The player leadership group for the 2019 season also consisted of Richelle Cranston, Renee Garing, Aasta O'Connor and Anna Teague.

Ford Australia and Deakin University were the major sponsors of the AFLW team for the 2019 season. Ford's partnership extended a long-running sponsorship deal that had existed since 1925 with the Geelong Football Club.

== Playing list ==
=== Recruitment ===
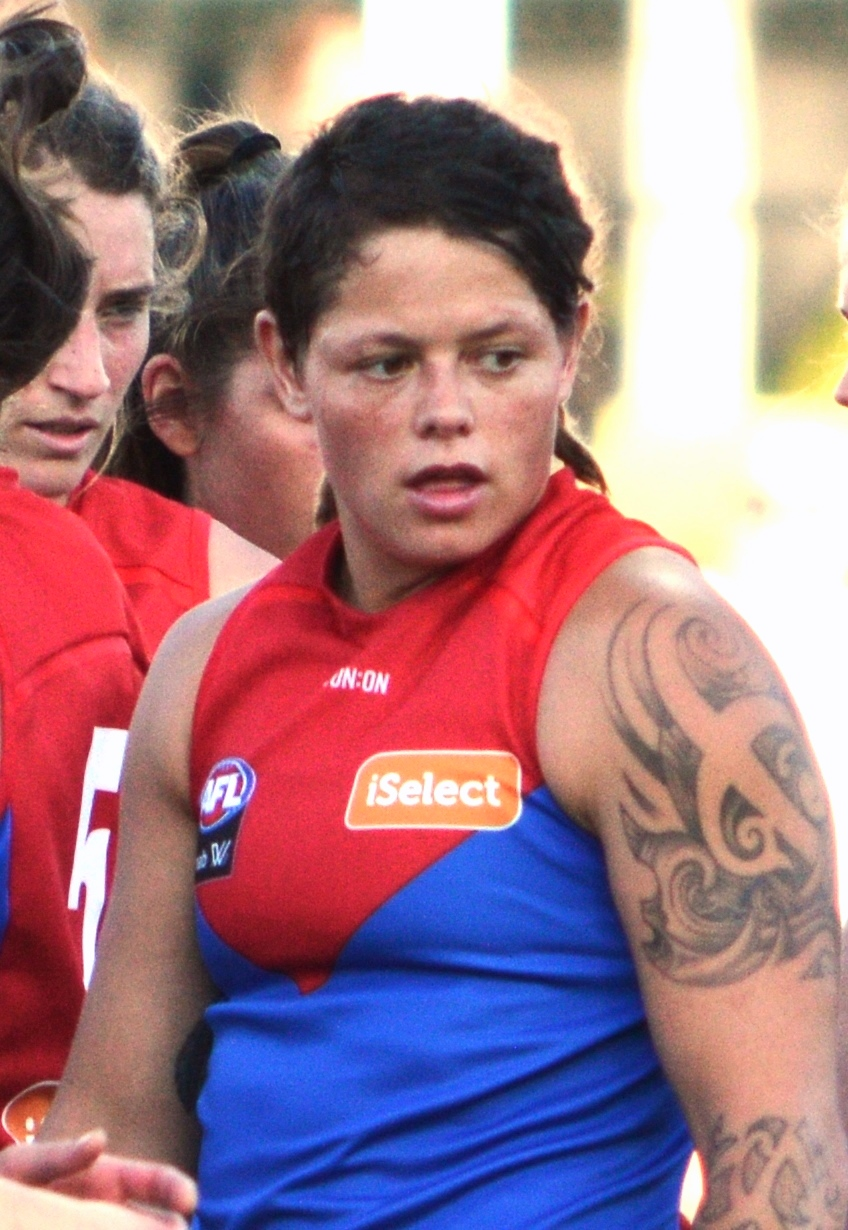
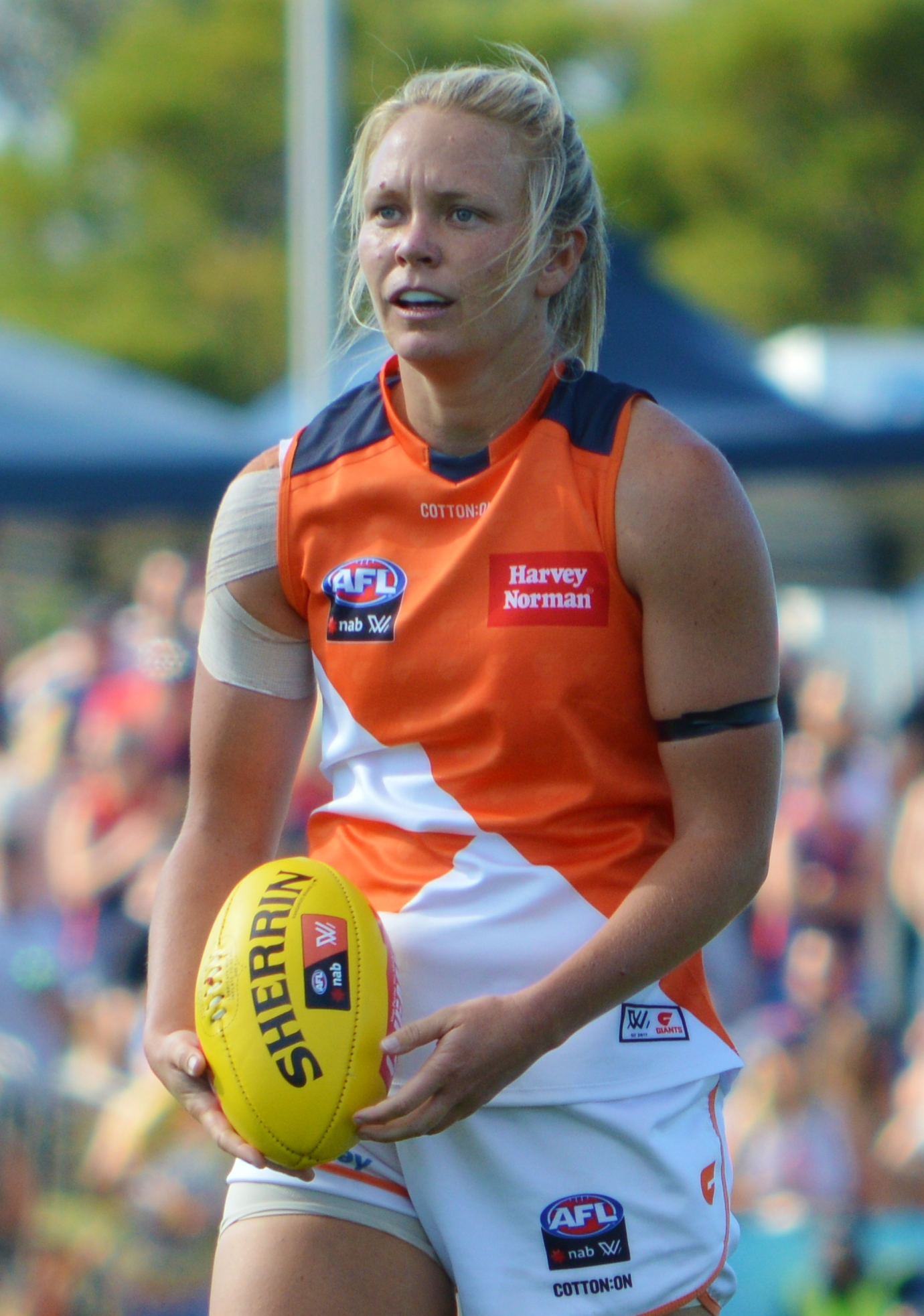
Richelle Cranston (Melbourne) and Phoebe McWilliams (Greater Western Sydney) were recruited by Geelong in the off–season.

The playing list size of each AFLW team was set at 30 players for the 2019 season, with two of these players signed as "cross-code" rookies that had not participated in any Australian rules football competition during the previous three years.

In preparation for the clubs' entry into the league, both Geelong and North Melbourne were provided with a range of recruitment concessions. This included an exclusive ten-day signing period held in May 2018 where the two expansion clubs could recruit players from existing AFLW clubs. During this period Geelong signed: Richelle Cranston, Melissa Hickey, Erin Hoare and Anna Teague (from Melbourne); Aasta O'Connor (Western Bulldogs); Maddie Boyd and Phoebe McWilliams (Greater Western Sydney). There was also the potential to sign players over the age of 18 who did not play in the AFLW in 2018, with the Cats recruiting six players from their VFLW team: Cassie Blakeway, Kate Darby, Renee Garing, Rebecca Goring, Jordan Ivey and Danielle Orr.

Due to the club only signing thirteen players during the expansion club signing period (compared to North Melbourne's seventeen players), Geelong was awarded four compensation selections in the upcoming draft—including the first two picks.

Following the expansion club signing period, all clubs could participate in a signing and trading period that ran from 23 May to 4 June 2018. Geelong were not heavily involved in trading with clubs, preferring to focus on building their list through their VFLW player signings.

The AFLW draft was held in October 2018, with the Cats selecting the final ten players of their inaugural list: Nina Morrison (pick 1), Sophie Van De Heuvel (2), Rebecca Webster (7), Olivia Purcell (14), Denby Taylor (20), Georgia Clarke (24), Rene Caris (35), Maighan Fogas (47), Elise Coventry (57) and Madeline Keryk (62).

=== Statistics ===
Geelong utilised the majority of their playing list for this season, with only Elise Coventry and Hayley Trevean not appearing in an AFLW game. There were ten players who played in all eight of the club's games. Mia-Rae Clifford was the club's leading goalkicker, scoring six goals.

Playing list and statistics
Player	No.	Games	Goals	Behinds	Kicks	Handballs	Disposals	Marks	Tackles
Rene Caris	1	2	0	1	4	8	12	0	1
Danielle Orr	2	8	1	1	35	32	67	13	23
Hannah Burchell	3	1	0	0	6	2	8	2	1
Cassie Blakeway	4	7	0	0	34	18	52	9	11
Jordan Ivey	5	8	0	4	36	22	58	17	33
Julia Crockett-Grills	6	8	0	1	45	20	65	10	27
Mia-Rae Clifford	7	8	6	2	30	8	38	12	18
Kate Darby	8	7	5	4	40	13	53	12	18
Nina Morrison	9	1	0	1	13	9	22	2	8
Georgie Rankin	10	2	0	0	3	7	10	1	6
Meg McDonald	11	8	0	0	80	46	126	21	10
Renee Garing	12	8	0	1	43	61	104	9	64
Maighan Fogas	13	1	0	0	4	2	6	2	2
Aasta O'Connor	14	5	0	1	22	10	32	7	14
Olivia Purcell	16	8	2	0	58	66	124	9	41
Georgia Clarke	17	6	1	0	31	9	40	10	6
Melissa Hickey	18	6	0	0	33	26	59	18	23
Rebecca Webster	21	4	0	1	11	15	26	4	4
Phoebe McWilliams	23	6	3	4	27	9	36	19	13
Maddy McMahon	24	7	0	0	54	29	83	21	16
Elise Coventry	25	—	—	—	—	—	—	—	—
Maddie Boyd	26	7	2	2	24	23	47	20	12
Sophie Van De Heuvel	27	7	1	0	25	18	43	7	14
Denby Taylor	28	8	0	0	37	23	60	5	16
Richelle Cranston	30	6	1	3	62	32	94	13	27
Hayley Trevean	33	—	—	—	—	—	—	—	—
Anna Teague	40	6	0	0	25	11	36	7	10
Rebecca Goring	44	8	0	0	17	19	46	10	18
Madeline Keryk	45	8	0	0	62	32	94	15	38
Erin Hoare	46	7	0	0	15	20	35	6	18

== Season summary ==
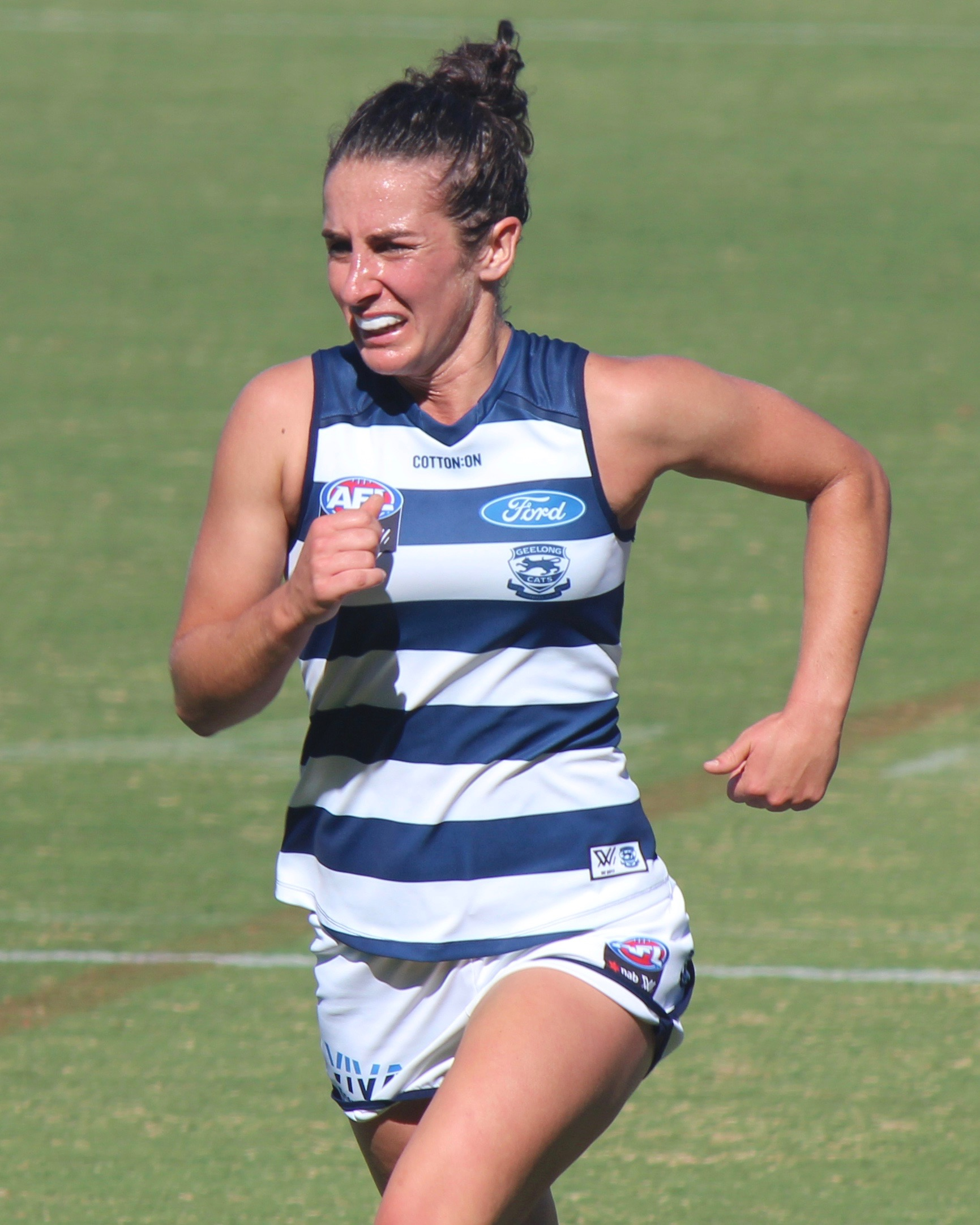
Rebecca Goring was acting captain for Geelong's first two games of the season.

Due to the expansion in the number of teams participating in the AFLW competition, a conference system was introduced for the 2019 season. This involved two conferences ("Conference A" and "Conference B") consisting of five teams, with each team playing the other teams in their conference once—as well as three games against teams from the alternate conference. This equated to each team playing a total of seven matches in the regular season, with the two top teams in each conference qualifying for the finals series. Geelong were placed in Conference B with Brisbane, Carlton, Collingwood and Greater Western Sydney.

Geelong began the regular season against Collingwood at GMHBA Stadium, narrowly winning their first AFLW match by one point. Nina Morrison was nominated for the league's Rising Star award after accumulating 22 disposals and eight tackles and kicking the winning behind in a best-on-ground performance. This was to be Morrison's only game for the season, as she ruptured the anterior cruciate ligament (ACL) in her right knee at training the following week, which required a reconstruction. Geelong were defeated by reigning premiers Western Bulldogs in round two, recording an 18-point margin.

Captain Melissa Hickey missed the first two matches of the season due to injury, with vice-captain Rebecca Goring assuming the captain's role in Hickey's absence. Hickey played her first game for the Cats in round three, captaining a loss against Adelaide. Geelong won their next two matches, defeating Carlton and Brisbane to move to first position on the Conference B ladder after round five. Brisbane's score of 1.2 (8) was the lowest overall score in AFLW history at the time. Geelong played Fremantle in round six and despite leading after the first quarter, were defeated by 36 points after not scoring in the second half of the match. In the final round of the season, the Cats suffered a 31-point defeat by Greater Western Sydney, with a score of just 1.4 (10).

The club finished the regular season with a 3–4 win–loss record and placed second on the Conference B ladder, qualifying for the 2019 finals series. Geelong were subsequently defeated in a preliminary final against Adelaide by 66 points, and therefore did not progress to the 2019 AFL Women's Grand Final. Geelong's score of 1.1 (7) was the lowest overall score in AFLW history.

=== Results ===
Key
H	Home game
A	Away game
PF	Preliminary finals

Table of season results
Round	Date	Result	Score			Opponent	Score			Ground		Attendance
Round	Date	Result	G	B	T	Opponent	G	B	T	Ground		Attendance
1	2 February	Won	3	6	24	Collingwood	3	5	23	GMHBA Stadium	H	18,429
2	9 February	Lost	2	4	16	Western Bulldogs	5	4	34	VU Whitten Oval	A	8,612
3	17 February	Lost	6	1	37	Adelaide	10	6	66	Norwood Oval	A	4,433
4	23 February	Won	2	7	19	Carlton	1	8	14	GMHBA Stadium	H	7,060
5	2 March	Won	5	5	35	Brisbane	1	2	8	Moreton Bay Central Sports Complex	A	Unknown
6	9 March	Lost	2	1	13	Fremantle	6	13	49	GMHBA Stadium	H	4,125
7	15 March	Lost	1	4	10	Greater Western Sydney	6	5	41	UNSW Canberra Oval	A	4,524
PF	24 March	Lost (Note: Geelong were eliminated from the finals series as a result of their preliminary final loss to Adelaide)	1	1	7	Adelaide	11	7	73	Adelaide Oval	A	13,429

=== Ladder ===
Conference B
Pos	Team	Pld	W	L	D	PF	PA	PP	Pts	Qualification
1	Carlton	7	4	3	0	257	258	99.6	16	Preliminary finals
2	Geelong	7	3	4	0	154	235	65.5	12	Preliminary finals
3	Greater Western Sydney	7	2	5	0	208	295	70.5	8	
4	Brisbane	7	2	5	0	193	274	70.4	8	
5	Collingwood	7	1	6	0	162	243	66.7	4	

Source: womens.afl
Rules for classification: 1) points; 2) percentage; 3) number of points for.

== Awards ==
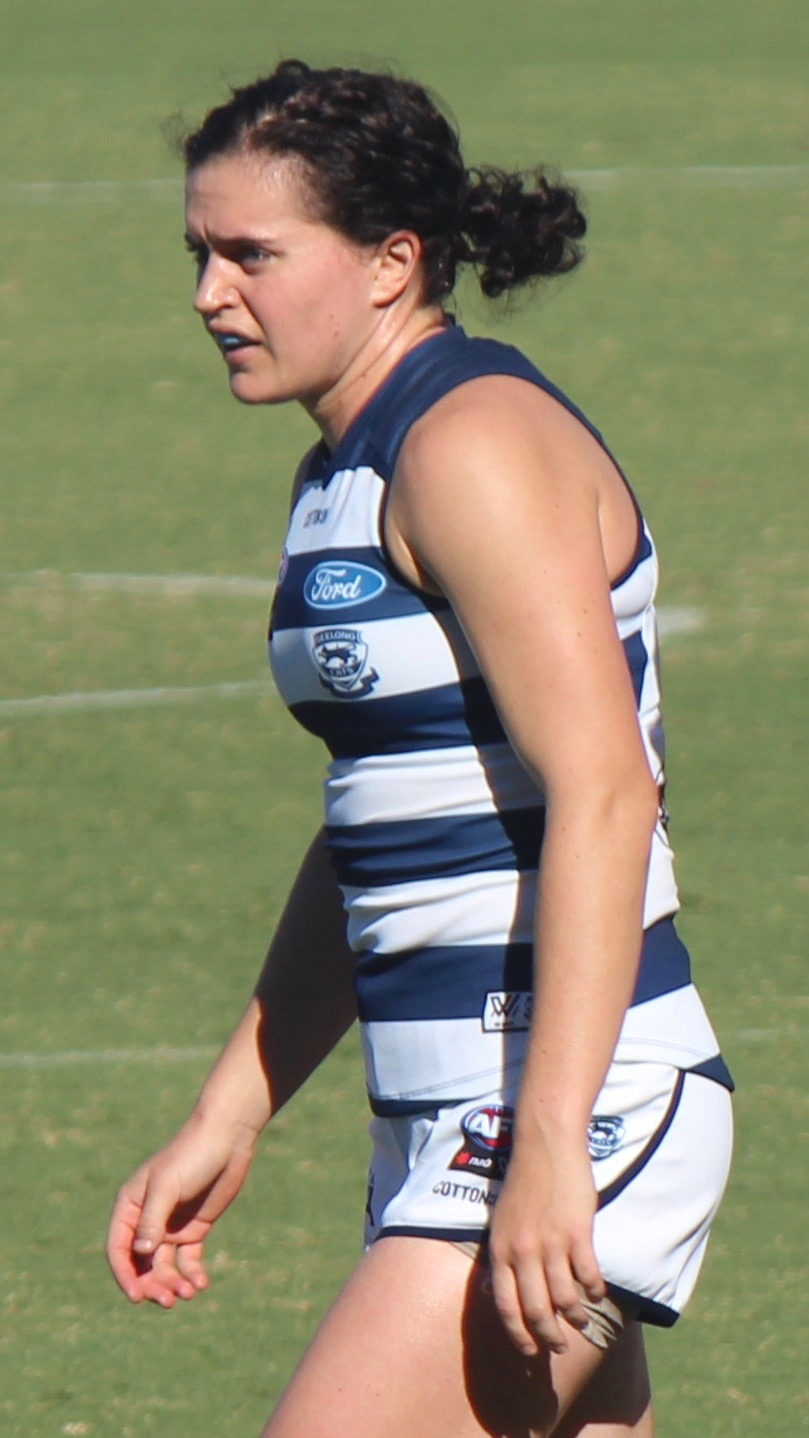
Meg McDonald won the club's best and fairest award for the season.

Geelong's inaugural AFL Women's best and fairest was announced in a ceremony held at GMHBA Stadium on 5 April. The award was won by Meg McDonald, who received 182 votes; runner-up Olivia Purcell received 168 votes, with Renee Garing and Maddy McMahon in joint third place on 157 votes. Additionally, captain Melissa Hickey received the ‘Hoops’ award, for best representing the club's values, and Kate Darby was presented with the 'Community Champion' award.

McDonald and McMahon were both shortlisted for the honorary 2019 AFL Women's All-Australian team, however only McDonald was selected in the final team. Geelong also had two players, Nina Morrison (round one) and Purcell (round five), who were nominated for the season's Rising Star award.

Table of awards received by Geelong players
Award	Awarded by	Player	Result	Ref.
All-Australian team	AFL Women's	Meg McDonald	Selected	
All-Australian team	AFL Women's	Maddy McMahon	Shortlisted	
AFL Rising Star	AFL Women's	Nina Morrison	Nominated	
AFL Rising Star	AFL Women's	Olivia Purcell	Nominated	
Best and fairest	Geelong Football Club	Meg McDonald	Won	
The ‘Hoops’ Award	Geelong Football Club	Melissa Hickey	Won	
Community Champion	Geelong Football Club	Kate Darby	Won	

== VFLW Season ==
In their third season in the second-tier VFL Women’s competition, AFLW coach Paul Hood stepped aside as Natalie Wood became the first female head coach in club history. Geelong appointed five players to a leadership group: Maddy Keryk, Amy McDonald, Danielle Higgins, Kate Darby, and Jordan Ivey sharing and rotating the captaincy responsibilities.

Making the finals from sixth position, the team was eliminated by Melbourne University in the first elimination final.

=== Results ===
Key
H	Home game
A	Away game
EF	Elimination Final

Table of season results
Round	Date	Result	Score			Opponent	Score			Ground	
Round	Date	Result	G	B	T	Opponent	G	B	T	Ground	
1	12 May	Lost	5	3	33	Melbourne University	12	5	77	University Oval, Parkville	A
2	18 May	Won	7	2	44	Essendon	5	9	39	Central Reserve, Colac	H
3	25 May	Lost	2	3	15	Collingwood	3	4	22	GMHBA Stadium	H
4	2 June	Lost	1	6	12	Western Bulldogs	3	1	19	Whitten Oval	A
5	8 June	Lost	5	3	33	Richmond	8	7	55	Punt Road Oval	A
6	Bye										
7	22 June	Won	8	8	56	Casey	4	3	27	GMHBA Stadium	H
8	29 June	Won	5	3	33	Carlton	4	2	26	IKON Park	A
9	6 July	Won	4	7	31	Hawthorn	3	6	24	Box Hill City Oval	A
10	13 July	Won	3	7	25	Southern Saints	2	4	16	Deakin University, Waurn Ponds	H
11	Bye										
12	27 July	Lost	4	1	25	Darebin	6	5	41	Preston City Oval	A
13	4 August	Won	9	8	62	NT Thunder	3	1	19	GMHBA Stadium	H
14	10 August	Lost	4	6	30	Melbourne University	7	2	44	Deakin University, Waurn Ponds	H
15	18 August	Won	8	4	52	Williamstown	1	0	6	La Trobe University, Bundoora	A
16	24 August	Won	7	6	48	Carlton	2	3	15	GMHBA Stadium	H
EF	31 August	Lost	6	7	43	Melbourne University	9	2	56	North Port Oval	N

=== Ladder ===
Pos	Team	Pld	W	L	D	PF	PA	PP	Pts	Qualification
1	Collingwood (P)	14	12	2	0	587	351	167.2	48	Finals series
2	Southern Saints	14	11	3	0	523	299	174.9	44	Finals series
3	Western Bulldogs	14	10	4	0	478	320	149.4	40	Finals series
4	Richmond	14	9	5	0	617	494	124.9	36	Finals series
5	Melbourne University	14	8	6	0	662	502	131.9	32	Finals series
6	Geelong Cats	14	8	6	0	499	430	116.0	32	Finals series
7	Hawthorn	14	7	6	1	507	457	110.9	30	
8	Casey Demons	14	6	8	0	497	435	114.3	24	
9	Essendon	14	6	8	0	473	501	94.4	24	
10	NT Thunder	14	5	9	0	442	664	66.6	20	
11	Darebin	14	4	10	0	366	553	66.2	16	
12	Carlton	14	3	10	1	398	563	70.7	14	
13	Williamstown	14	1	13	0	211	691	30.5	4	

Source: SportsTG
Rules for classification: 1) points; 2) percentage; 3) number of points for.
(P) Premiers

=== Awards ===
- Best & Fairest: Rebecca Webster
- VFL Women’s Team of the Year: Rebecca Webster (Half back); Amy McDonald (Interchange)

== See also ==
- 2019 Geelong Football Club season
