= List of Geelong Football Club women's players =

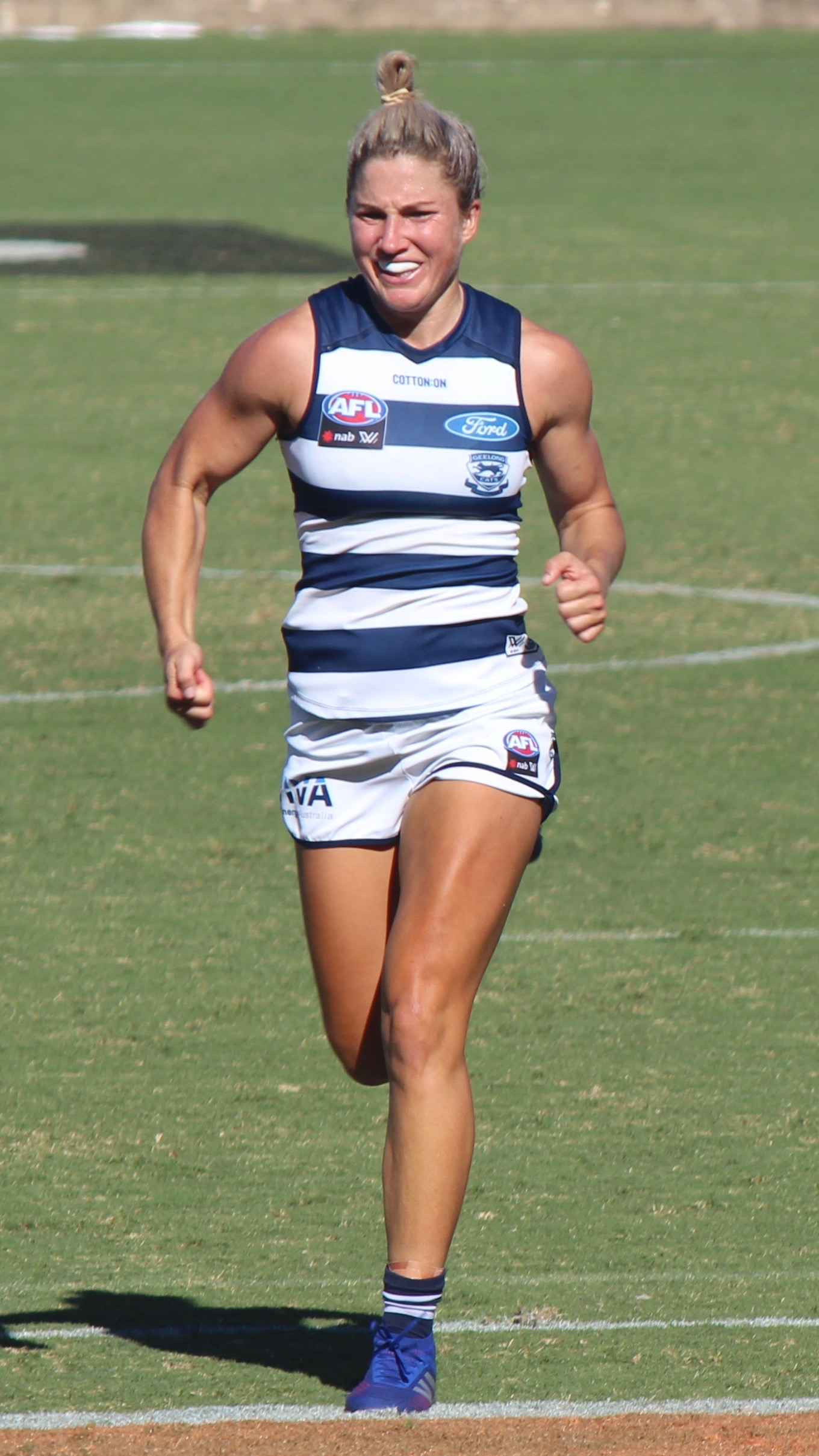
Melissa Hickey was Geelong's inaugural AFL Women's captain.

Geelong Football Club is a professional Australian rules football club based in Geelong, Victoria. The club itself was established in 1859, and has participated in the Australian Football League (AFL), the top-level men's competition, since its formation in 1897. (Note: The Australian Football League was known as the Victorian Football League (VFL) prior to 1990.) Following the inaugural season of the related AFL Women's (AFLW) league in 2017, Geelong was granted a licence to join the AFLW as an expansion club, and played its first match in this league during the opening round of the 2019 season.

In preparation for the club's entry into the league, Geelong were provided with a range of recruitment concessions, including early access to existing clubs' players prior to the league's signing period, and additional selections in the 2018 national draft.

The playing list size for each AFLW club in the upcoming 2020 season will be set at 30 players, with up to three of these players listed as rookies. Rookie players must not have played with any Australian rules football club within the prior three years. As every club is required to make a minimum number of changes to its list at the end of each season, not every player necessarily makes a senior appearance for the club before being removed from the playing list.

Since its first competitive appearance, 62 players have represented the club in an AFLW premiership match.

== Players ==
Table headers and key
Order	Players are listed according to the date of their AFLW debut for the club.
Seasons	The yearspan of the player's AFLW appearances for Geelong.
Debut	Players' first AFLW match for Geelong.
Games	The number of games played.
Goals	The number of goals scored.
^{^}	Player is currently on Geelong's AFLW playing list.
Statistics are updated as of end of the 2025 AFL Women's season.

Table of Geelong Football Club players, with appearance details
Name	Jumper No.	Order	Season(s)	Debut	Games	Goals	Ref.
Cassie Blakeway	4	1	2019–2020	round 1, 2019	8	0	
Maddie Boyd	26	2	2019–2021	round 1, 2019	13	4	
Mia-Rae Clifford	7	3	2019	round 1, 2019	8	6	
Julia Crockett-Grills^	6	4	2019–present	round 1, 2019	72	18	
Kate Darby	8	5	2019–2020, 2022 (S6)–2025	round 1, 2019	57	17	
Maighan Fogas	13	6	2019	round 1, 2019	1	0	
Renee Garing	12	7	2019–2023	round 1, 2019	33	2	
Rebecca Goring	44	8	2019–2021	round 1, 2019	17	0	
Jordan Ivey	5	9	2019–2022 (S6)	round 1, 2019	31	1	
Madeline Keryk	45	10	2019–2022 (S7)	round 1, 2019	39	0	
Meg McDonald	11	11	2019–2025	round 1, 2019	72	1	
Maddy McMahon	24	12	2019–2022 (S6) (Note: Inactive for 2022 (S7) AFL Women's season)	round 1, 2019	32	0	
Nina Morrison^	9	13	2019–present	round 1, 2019	62	22	
Aasta O'Connor	14	14	2019–2021	round 1, 2019	20	1	
Danielle Higgins	2	15	2019–2022 (S6)	round 1, 2019	24	6	
Olivia Purcell	16	16	2019–2021	round 1, 2019	19	6	
Georgie Rankin^	10	17	2019–present	round 1, 2019	66	2	
Denby Taylor	28	18	2019–2021 (Note: Inactive for 2022 (S6) AFL Women's season)	round 1, 2019	18	0	
Anna Teague	40	19	2019–2020	round 1, 2019	9	0	
Sophie Van De Heuvel	27	20	2019–2022 (S6)	round 1, 2019	31	1	
Rebecca Webster^	21	21	2019–present	round 1, 2019	73	10	
Georgia Clarke	17	22	2019–2022 (S7)	round 2, 2019	19	8	
Erin Hoare	46	23	2019, 2023	round 2, 2019	19	0	
Phoebe McWilliams	23	24	2019–2022 (S6)	round 2, 2019	31	21	
Richelle Cranston	30	25	2019–2021	round 3, 2019	21	11	
Melissa Hickey	18	26	2019–20	round 3, 2019	12	0	
Rene Caris	1	27	2019–2022 (S6)	round 5, 2019	12	1	
Hannah Burchell	3	28	2019	round 7, 2019	1	0	
Millie Brown	19	29	2020–2021 (Note: Inactive for 2022 (S6) AFL Women's season)	round 1, 2020	9	0	
Madisen Maguire	7	30	2020–2022 (S6)	round 1, 2020	10	2	
Amy McDonald^	3	31	2020–present	round 1, 2020	68	9	
Darcy Moloney	4	32	2021–2024	round 1, 2021	46	11	
Olivia Barber	15	33	2021–2022 (S6)	round 2, 2021	10	3	
Stephanie Williams	25	34	2021–2022 (S6)	round 2, 2021	4	0	
Nicole Garner	22	35	2021	round 3, 2021	7	0	
Laura Gardiner	18	36	2021–2022 (S7)	round 4, 2021	18	2	
Carly Remmos	29	37	2021–2022 (S6)	round 8, 2021	2	0	
Chantel Emonson^	16	38	2022 (S6)–present (Note: Inactive for 2025 AFL Women's season)	round 1, 2022 (S6)	45	1	
Zali Friswell^	8 (Note: Friswell played 52 matches wearing guernsey number #20 from 2022 AFL Women's season 6 through 2025, changing to guernsey number #8 from the 2026 AFL Women's season.)	39	2022 (S6)–present	round 1, 2022 (S6)	52	6	
Olivia Fuller	13	40	2022 (S6)–2024 (Note: Inactive for 2024 AFL Women's season)	round 1, 2022 (S6)	20	1	
Claudia Gunjaca^	26	41	2022 (S6)–present	round 1, 2022 (S6)	50	0	
Annabel Johnson	2 (Note: Johnson played four matches wearing guernsey number #30 during 2022 AFL Women's season 6, changing to guernsey number #2 from the 2022 AFL Women's season 7.)	42	2022 (S6)–2023	round 1, 2022 (S6)	16	0	
Rachel Kearns^	22	43	2022 (S6)–present	round 1, 2022 (S6)	46	6	
Georgie Prespakis^	41	44	2022 (S6)–present	round 1, 2022 (S6)	53	12	
Chloe Scheer^	14	45	2022 (S6)–present (Note: Did not make any appearances during the 2024 or 2025 AFL Women's seasons)	round 1, 2022 (S6)	32	41	
Gabbi Featherston	32	46	2022 (S6)–2025	round 2, 2022 (S6)	22	0	
Mikayla Bowen^	1	47	2022 (S7)–present	round 1, 2022 (S7)	47	13	
Jacqueline Parry^	5	48	2022 (S7)–present	round 1, 2022 (S7)	47	42	
Shelley Scott	15	49	2022 (S7)–2025 (Note: Did not make any appearances during the 2025 AFL Women's season)	round 1, 2022 (S7)	28	21	
Mia Skinner	25	50	2022 (S7)–2023 (Note: Did not make any appearances during the 2023 AFL Women's season)	round 1, 2022 (S7)	5	1	
Kalani Scoullar	29	51	2022 (S7)	round 3, 2022 (S7)	2	0	
Brooke Plummer	19	52	2022 (S7)–2024	round 5, 2022 (S7)	8	0	
Melissa Bragg	44	53	2022 (S7)–2025	round 6, 2022 (S7)	18	0	
Abbey McDonald	39	54	2023–2024	round 1, 2023	8	0	
Aishling Moloney^	45	55	2023–present	round 1, 2023	36	48	
Kate Surman^	7	56	2023–present	round 1, 2023	34	8	
Anna-Rose Kennedy	18	57	2023–2024	preliminary final, 2023	12	0	
Kate Kenny^	12	58	2024–present	week 1, 2024	19	6	
Caitlin Thorne	25	59	2024–2025	week 4, 2024	11	1	
Bryde O'Rourke^	23	60	2024–present	week 6, 2024	6	0	
Bella Smith	2	61	2024–2025	week 6, 2024	11	0	
Chantal Mason^	24	62	2024–present	week 8, 2024	9	6	
Piper Dunlop^	18 (Note: Dunlop played nine matches wearing guernsey number #38 during the 2025 AFL Women's season, changing to guernsey number #18 from the 2026 AFL Women's season.)	63	2025–present	round 1, 2025	9	0	
Emma Kilpatrick^	27	64	2025–present	round 1, 2025	11	1	
Erica Fowler	17	65	2025	round 2, 2025	8	1	
Lexi Gregor^	30	66	2025–present	round 4, 2025	9	0	
Sienna Tallariti^	13	67	2025–present	round 4, 2025	7	0	
Caitlin Tipping^	4	68	2025–present	round 8, 2025	5	0	
Priya Bowering^	15	69	2026–present	round 1, 2026	1	0	
Evie Cowcher^	11	70	2026–present	round 1, 2026	1	0	
Emma Murray^	28	71	2026–present	round 1, 2026	1	0	
Nicola Stevens^	2	72	2026–present	round 3, 2026	1	0	
Annie Lee^	19	73	2026–present	round 4, 2026	1	0	
Renee Morgan^	25	74	2026–present	round 4, 2026	1	0	
Jasmin Stewart^	17	75	2026–present	round 4, 2026	1	0	

=== Other listed players ===
Table of listed players with no senior appearances for Geelong
Player	Date of birth	Acquired via	Listed		Ref.
Player	Date of birth	Acquired via	Rookie	Senior	Ref.
Elise Coventry	20 June 1984	No. 57, 2018 national draft	—	2019	
Hayley Trevean	10 August 1988	Off-season signing	—	2019	
Gemma Wright	5 June 1994	No. 34, 2019 national draft	—	2020	
Samantha Gooden	19 September 1996	Rookie signing	2022 (S7)–2023	—	
Ingrid Houtsma	20 November 2003	Traded from Richmond	—	2022 (S7)–2023	
Lily Pearce	31 December 2002	Replacement player signing	—	2024	
Alissa Brook	23 May 2005	Delisted free agent signing from Port Adelaide	—	2026	

== See also ==
- List of Geelong Football Club players
