= List of AFL Women's debuts in 2019 =

The 2019 AFL Women's (AFLW) season was the third season of the AFLW. The season saw 92 Australian rules footballers make their senior AFLW debut and a further 38 players transfer to new clubs having previously played in the AFLW.

== Summary ==
Summary of debuts in 2019
Club	Debut		Total
Club	AFLW	New club	Total
Adelaide	7	2	9
Brisbane	9	1	10
Carlton	9	2	11
Collingwood	11	2	13
Fremantle	9	1	10
Geelong	16	12	28
Greater Western Sydney	9	1	10
Melbourne	5	1	6
North Melbourne	12	15	27
Western Bulldogs	5	1	6
Total	92	38	130

== AFL Women's debuts ==
Name	Club	Age at debut	Debut round	Games	Goals	Notes
Danielle Ponter	Adelaide	18 years, 193 days	2	86	91	Niece of Michael Long and cousin of Cyril Rioli.
Hannah Martin	Adelaide	22 years, 67 days	1	39	3	Sister of Rachelle Martin.
Ailish Considine	Adelaide	26 years, 208 days	1	26	9	
Nikki Gore	Adelaide	18 years, 89 days	6	21	2	
Chloe Scheer	Adelaide	19 years, 148 days	1	17	13	
Renee Forth	Adelaide	32 years, 5 days	1	17	2	Previously played for Greater Western Sydney.
Sophie Li	Adelaide	30 years, 308 days	1	14	1	Previously played for Carlton.
Jessica Foley	Adelaide	35 years, 288 days	1	13	4	
Maisie Nankivell	Adelaide	19 years, 126 days	1	2	0	
Nat Grider	Brisbane	18 years, 136 days	4	85	0	
Jade Ellenger	Brisbane	19 years, 6 days	6	79	10	
Jesse Wardlaw	Brisbane	19 years, 21 days	1	49	47	
Lauren Arnell	Brisbane	31 years, 325 days	1	25	5	Previously played for Carlton.
Jessy Keeffe	Brisbane	22 years, 222 days	4	11	0	Sister of Lachlan Keefe.
McKenzie Dowrick	Brisbane	18 years, 333 days	1	7	0	
Paige Parker	Brisbane	23 years, 272 days	1	4	0	
Jacqui Yorston	Brisbane	18 years, 121 days	4	4	0	Partner of Danah Boyd.
Lauren Bella	Brisbane	18 years, 144 days	1	3	0	Daughter of Anthony Bella.
Tori Groves-Little	Brisbane	18 years, 120 days	2	2	0	
Abbie McKay	Carlton	18 years, 100 days	4	62	9	Daughter of Andrew Mckay and sister of Sophie McKay.
Maddy Prespakis	Carlton	18 years, 93 days	1	34	15	2020 AFL Women's best and fairest. Sister of Georgie Prespakis.
Brooke Walker	Carlton	23 years, 305 days	3	26	14	Represented Australia in Rugby 7s and Touch Football.
Charlotte Wilson	Carlton	18 years, 63 days	5	22	0	
Chloe Dalton	Carlton	25 years, 207 days	1	16	5	Gold medallist in Rugby 7s at the 2016 Summer Olympics.
Jessica Edwards	Carlton	29 years, 136 days	1	14	1	
Jayde Van Dyk	Carlton	22 years, 312 days	1	10	0	
Amelia Mullane	Carlton	25 years, 292 days	1	9	0	Previously played for Collingwood.
Kirby Bentley	Carlton	32 years, 270 days	1	3	0	Previously played for Fremantle.
Rhiannon Watt	Carlton	31 years, 64 days	2	2	0	
Emerson Woods	Carlton	18 years, 233 days	5	1	0	
Mikala Cann	Collingwood	18 years, 90 days	1	76	15	
Sarah Rowe	Collingwood	23 years, 192 days	1	75	13	
Jordyn Allen	Collingwood	18 years, 211 days	1	71	6	
Lauren Butler	Collingwood	18 years, 74 days	1	61	5	
Erica Fowler	Collingwood	26 years, 209 days	1	46	2	
Sophie Alexander	Collingwood	25 years, 253 days	1	31	16	
Sharni Layton	Collingwood	31 years, 27 days	1	23	6	2014 Commonwealth Games netball gold medallist.
Jordan Membrey	Collingwood	23 years, 54 days	4	23	13	Previously played for Carlton.
Matilda Sergeant	Fremantle	19 years, 355 days	5	19	0	
Maddie Shevlin	Collingwood	21 years, 148 days	3	13	1	
Katie Lynch	Collingwood	18 years, 309 days	2	7	1	
Georgia Gourlay	Collingwood	19 years, 316 days	1	5	0	
Darcy Guttridge	Collingwood	19 years, 123 days	5	3	3	
Nicole Hildebrand	Collingwood	25 years, 86 days	3	2	0	Previously played for Brisbane.
Laura Pugh	Fremantle	25 years, 94 days	1	77	3	
Angelique Stannett	Fremantle	21 years, 294 days	1	69	11	
Kiara Bowers	Fremantle	27 years, 79 days	1	61	10	
Philipa Seth	Fremantle	24 years, 349 days	1	58	3	
Sabreena Duffy	Fremantle	18 years, 314 days	1	25	30	
Katie-Jayne Grieve	Fremantle	21 years, 332 days	1	14	3	Previously played for Carlton.
Parris Laurie	Fremantle	24 years, 56 days	1	8	0	
Brianna Moyes	Fremantle	27 years, 336 days	3	1	0	
Courtney Stubbs	Fremantle	22 years, 150 days	4	1	0	
Rebecca Webster	Geelong	18 years, 103 days	1	73	10	
Julia Crockett-Grills	Geelong	24 years, 97 days	1	72	18	
Meg McDonald	Geelong	27 years, 218 days	1	72	1	Previously played for Western Bulldogs.
Kate Darby	Geelong	28 years, 76 days	1	57	17	Previously played for Carlton.
Georgie Rankin	Geelong	21 years, 5 days	1	66	2	Great-great-granddaughter of Teddy Rankin and great-niece of Cliff, Doug and Bert Rankin.
Nina Morrison	Geelong	18 years, 51 days	1	62	22	
Madeline Keryk	Geelong	23 years, 330 days	1	39	0	Previously played for Carlton.
Renee Garing	Geelong	30 years, 151 days	1	33	2	
Maddy McMahon	Geelong	29 years, 298 days	1	32	0	
Sophie Van De Heuvel	Geelong	18 years, 54 days	1	31	1	
Jordan Ivey	Geelong	26 years, 96 days	1	31	1	Previously played for Carlton.
Phoebe McWilliams	Geelong	33 years, 162 days	2	31	21	Previously played for Greater Western Sydney.
Danielle Orr	Geelong	28 years, 141 days	1	24	6	
Richelle Cranston	Geelong	29 years, 145 days	3	21	11	Previously played for Melbourne.
Aasta O'Connor	Geelong	31 years, 226 days	1	20	1	Previously played for Western Bulldogs.
Olivia Purcell	Geelong	18 years, 150 days	1	19	6	
Georgia Clarke	Geelong	18 years, 231 days	2	19	8	
Erin Hoare	Geelong	29 years, 237 days	2	19	0	Previously played for Melbourne.
Denby Taylor	Geelong	18 years, 351 days	1	18	0	
Rebecca Goring	Geelong	24 years, 238 days	1	17	0	
Maddie Boyd	Geelong	25 years, 319 days	1	13	4	Previously played for Melbourne and Greater Western Sydney.
Mia-Rae Clifford	Geelong	32 years, 145 days	1	8	6	Previously played for Melbourne.
Rene Caris	Geelong	19 years, 349 days	5	12	1	
Melissa Hickey	Geelong	34 years, 61 days	3	12	0	Previously played for Melbourne.
Anna Teague	Geelong	31 years, 56 days	1	9	2	Previously played for Melbourne.
Cassie Blakeway	Geelong	25 years, 290 days	1	8	0	
Maighan Fogas	Geelong	23 years, 115 days	1	1	0	
Hannah Burchell	Geelong	24 years, 18 days	7	1	0	
Alyce Parker	Greater Western Sydney	18 years, 172 days	1	61	9	
Haneen Zreika	Greater Western Sydney	19 years, 294 days	1	58	10	
Tait Mackrill	Greater Western Sydney	19 years, 166 days	3	22	5	
Yvonne Bonner	Greater Western Sydney	31 years, 295 days	1	11	7	
Taylah Davies	Greater Western Sydney	24 years, 144 days	4	9	2	
Ingrid Nielsen	Greater Western Sydney	27 years, 89 days	4	7	0	
Christina Bernardi	Greater Western Sydney	28 years, 241 days	1	7	7	Previously played for Collingwood.
Brittany Perry	Greater Western Sydney	24 years, 336 days	2	4	0	
Lisa Whiteley	Greater Western Sydney	26 years, 52 days	6	2	0	
Delma Gisu	Greater Western Sydney	22 years, 256 days	7	1	0	
Tyla Hanks	Melbourne	18 years, 353 days	1	87	23	
Shelley Heath	Melbourne	18 years, 276 days	6	78	6	
Maddi Gay	Melbourne	22 years, 128 days	1	47	12	Previously played for Carlton.
Chantel Emonson	Melbourne	25 years, 271 days	1	22	3	
Ashleigh Woodland	Melbourne	20 years, 147 days	1	4	0	AFLW Leading Goalkicker 2022 (S6).
Shae Sloane	Melbourne	26 years, 278 days	1	1	0	Sister of Rory Sloane.
Tahlia Randall	North Melbourne	20 years, 250 days	1	90	82	Previously played for Brisbane.
Jasmine Garner	North Melbourne	24 years, 210 days	1	89	89	Previously played for Collingwood.
Ashleigh Riddell	North Melbourne	22 years, 333 days	1	85	19	2025 AFL Women's best and fairest winner.
Emma King	North Melbourne	24 years, 220 days	1	83	53	Previously played for Collingwood.
Jenna Bruton	North Melbourne	23 years, 87 days	1	81	13	Previously played for Western Bulldogs.
Emma Kearney	North Melbourne	29 years, 132 days	1	79	10	Previously played for Western Bulldogs.
Nicole Bresnehan	North Melbourne	21 years, 315 days	1	64	0	
Sophie Abbatangelo	North Melbourne	28 years, 221 days	1	42	29	
Daisy Bateman	North Melbourne	18 years, 348 days	1	34	22	
Kaitlyn Ashmore	North Melbourne	27 years, 87 days	1	33	17	Previously played for Brisbane.
Danielle Hardiman	North Melbourne	24 years, 58 days	1	30	0	Previously played for Carlton.
Kate Gillespie-Jones	North Melbourne	27 years, 283 days	1	24	5	Previously played for Carlton.
Daria Bannister	North Melbourne	19 years, 323 days	6	24	14	Previously played for Western Bulldogs.
Jasmine Grierson	North Melbourne	20 years, 263 days	1	19	0	Previously played for Melbourne.
Jess Duffin	North Melbourne	29 years, 221 days	1	19	1	Represented Australia in cricket. Previously played for Collingwood.
Jess Trend	North Melbourne	27 years, 217 days	1	14	1	
Brittany Gibson	North Melbourne	26 years, 291 days	1	14	3	Previously played for Brisbane.
Elisha King	North Melbourne	19 years, 238 days	2	10	3	
Beth Lynch	North Melbourne	21 years, 281 days	4	8	2	Sister of Tom Lynch.
Alison Drennan	North Melbourne	28 years, 4 days	1	7	1	
Moana Hope	North Melbourne	30 years, 354 days	1	7	8	Previously played for Collingwood.
Jamie Stanton	North Melbourne	23 years, 88 days	1	7	0	Previously played for Brisbane.
Emma Humphries	North Melbourne	24 years, 191 days	1	6	0	Previously played for Melbourne
Georgia Nanscawen	North Melbourne	26 years, 252 days	1	2	0	Represented Australia in field hockey at the 2012 Summer Olympics.
Courteney Munn	North Melbourne	20 years, 67 days	3	2	4	
Taylor Mesiti	North Melbourne	20 years, 352 days	6	2	0	
Chloe Haines	North Melbourne	18 years, 351 days	3	1	0	
Celine Moody	Western Bulldogs	21 years, 335 days	1	42	7	Sister of Breann Moody.
Eleanor Brown	Western Bulldogs	19 years, 13 days	1	39	1	
Aisling McCarthy	Western Bulldogs	22 years, 350 days	2	12	7	
Selena Karlson	Western Bulldogs	20 years, 194 days	4	3	0	
Belinda Smith	Western Bulldogs	23 years, 246 days	1	3	0	Previously played for Fremantle.
Kate Bartlett	Western Bulldogs	19 years, 279 days	7	1	0	
