= List of Geelong Football Club women's seasons =

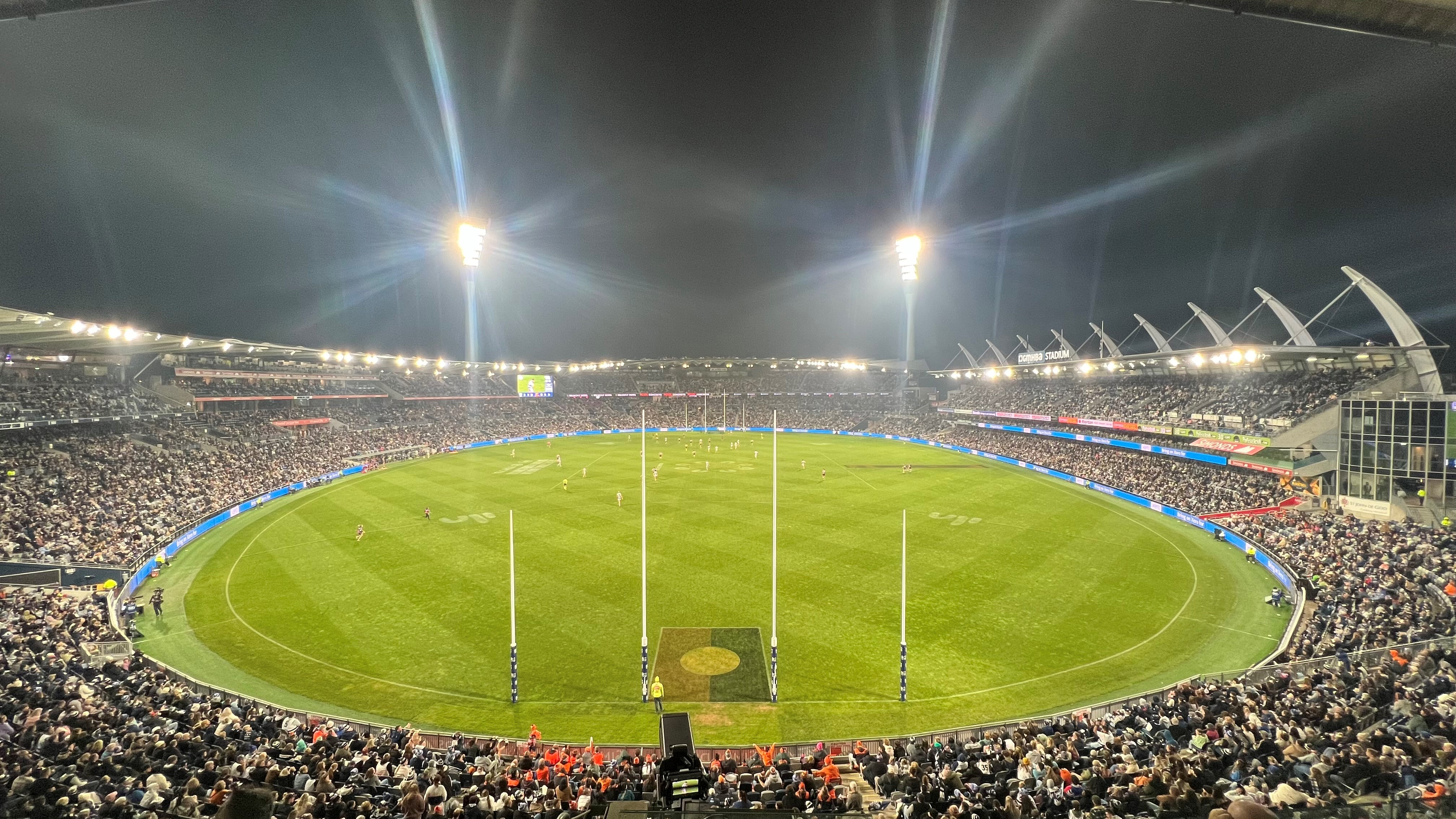
GMHBA Stadium, the current home stadium of the Geelong Football Club.

The Geelong Football Club is an Australian rules football club based in Geelong, Victoria. Formed in 1859, and a founding member of the Australian Football League (then known as the Victorian Football League) in 1897, the club introduced a women's team first entering the VFL Women's competition in 2017 ahead of their entry into the AFL Women's competition in 2019.

In September 2017, the club was announced as one of two clubs, along with North Melbourne, to receive a license to join the competition in 2019.

== Key ==
Table key
| ‡ | Club finished regular season in first position (minor premiers) |
| † | Club finished regular season in last position (wooden spoon) |
| DNQ | Club did not qualify for finals |
| — | Field not applicable for that season |

== AFL Women's ==
Geelong's AFL Women's record by season
| Season | League | Home and away results | | | | Finals results | Coach | Captain | Best and fairest | Leading goalkicker | Ref. |
| Season | League | Ladder | W | L | D | Finals results | Coach | Captain | Best and fairest | Leading goalkicker | Ref. |
|---|---|---|---|---|---|---|---|---|---|---|---|
| 2019 | AFLW (1) | 6th (Note: The ladder was split into two conferences. Figure refers to the club's overall finishing position in the home-and-away season.) | 3 | 4 | 0 | Lost Preliminary Final | Paul Hood | Melissa Hickey | Meg McDonald | Mia-Rae Clifford | |
| 2020 | AFLW (2) | 10th | 2 | 4 | 0 | DNQ | Paul Hood | Melissa Hickey | Olivia Purcell | Richelle Cranston | |
| 2021 | AFLW (3) | 13th | 1 | 8 | 0 | DNQ | Paul Hood | Meg McDonald | Amy McDonald | Richelle Cranston (2) | |
| 2022 (S6) | AFLW (4) | 12th | 2 | 8 | 0 | DNQ | Daniel Lowther | Meg McDonald | Amy McDonald (2) | Phoebe McWilliams | |
| 2022 (S7) | AFLW (5) | 5th | 7 | 3 | 0 | Lost Elimination Final | Daniel Lowther | Meg McDonald | Amy McDonald (3) | Chloe Scheer | |
| 2023 | AFLW (6) | 6th | 6 | 4 | 0 | Lost Preliminary Final | Daniel Lowther | Meg McDonald | Georgie Prespakis | Chloe Scheer (2) | |
| 2024 | AFLW (7) | 10th | 4 | 6 | 1 | DNQ | Daniel Lowther | Meg McDonald | Nina Morrison | Aishling Moloney | |
| 2025 | AFLW (8) | 13th | 5 | 7 | 0 | DNQ | Daniel Lowther | Meg McDonald | Georgie Prespakis (2) | Aishling Moloney (2) | |
| 2026 | AFLW (9) | 2nd | 11 | 1 | 0 | Lost Semi final | Mick Stinear | Nina Morrison; Rebecca Webster | | | |

== VFL Women's ==
Geelong's VFL Women's record by season
| Season | League | Home and away results | | | | Finals results | Coach | Captain | Best and fairest | Leading goalkicker | Ref. |
| Season | League | Ladder | W | L | D | Finals results | Coach | Captain | Best and fairest | Leading goalkicker | Ref. |
|---|---|---|---|---|---|---|---|---|---|---|---|
| 2017 | VFLW (1) | 5th | 8 | 6 | 0 | DNQ | Paul Hood | Rebecca Goring | Lily Mithen | Kate Darby | |
| 2018 | VFLW (2) | 4th | 10 | 3 | 1 | Runners-up | Paul Hood | Rebecca Goring | Richelle Cranston | Kate Darby (2) | |
| 2019 | VFLW (3) | 6th | 8 | 6 | 0 | Lost Elimination Final | Natalie Wood | Rotating (Note: Captaincy rotated through the following five players: Kate Darby, Danielle Higgins, Jordan Ivey, Maddy Keryk, Amy McDonald.) | Rebecca Webster | Madisen Maguire | |
| 2020 | VFLW season cancelled due to the COVID-19 pandemic | | | | | | | | | | |
| 2021 | VFLW (4) | 2nd | 10 | 4 | 0 | Grand Finalist (Note: After qualifying for the 2021 VFLW Grand Final, the match was postponed and later cancelled due to the COVID-19 pandemic in Victoria.) | Andrew Bruce | Michelle Fedele | Claudia Gunjaca | Olivia Barber | |
| 2022 | VFLW (5) | 4th | 10 | 4 | 0 | Lost Elimination Final | Andrew Bruce | Breanna Beckley | Paige Sheppard | Mia Skinner | |
| 2023 | VFLW (6) | 8th | 7 | 6 | 1 | DNQ | Elise Coventry | Chloe Leonard | Poppy Schaap | Olivia Cicolini | |
| 2024 | VFLW (7) | 14th^{†} | 3 | 11 | 0 | DNQ | Elise Coventry | Group (Note: the team nominated Abby Favell, Liv Stewart and Poppy Schaap as a three-person leadership group with no formal captain or vice-captain roles.) | Lily Jordan | Chantal Mason | |
| 2025 | VFLW (8) | 11th | 3 | 11 | 0 | DNQ | Taylah Hassett | Mel Staunton | Hayley Peck | Stephanie O'Kane | |
| 2026 | VFLW (9) | 7th | 8 | 6 | 0 | DNQ | Taylah Hassett | Mel Staunton | Lucy Marescuk | Nikita Harris | |

Additional references:Club historical data and VFLW stats

== See also ==
- List of Geelong Football Club women's players
