= 2019 VFL Women's season =

- Teams: 13
- Premiers: Collingwood; 1st premiership
- Minor premiers: Collingwood; 2nd minor premiership
- Best and fairest: Lauren Pearce; Darebin (18 votes)
- Leading goalkicker: Jaimee Lambert; Collingwood (21 goals)

The 2019 VFL Women's season was the fourth season of the VFL Women's (VFLW). The season commenced on 5 May and concluded with the Grand Final on 22 September 2019. The competition was contested by thirteen clubs. This was to be the last VFLW season until 2021, with no competition held in 2020 due to the impact of the COVID-19 pandemic.

Collingwood won the minor premiership, finishing the home-and-away season with 12 wins. They would go on to win the Grand Final by 37 points against the Western Bulldogs at ETU Stadium.

== Clubs ==
- Darebin, Williamstown, Casey, Collingwood, Hawthorn, Essendon, Geelong Cats, Richmond
- Western Bulldogs, Northern Territory, Carlton, Melbourne University, Southern Saints

== Ladder ==
Pos	Team	Pld	W	L	D	PF	PA	PP	Pts	Qualification
1	Collingwood (P)	14	12	2	0	587	351	167.2	48	Finals series
2	Southern Saints	14	11	3	0	523	299	174.9	44	Finals series
3	Western Bulldogs	14	10	4	0	478	320	149.4	40	Finals series
4	Richmond	14	9	5	0	617	494	124.9	36	Finals series
5	Melbourne University	14	8	6	0	662	502	131.9	32	Finals series
6	Geelong Cats	14	8	6	0	499	430	116.0	32	Finals series
7	Hawthorn	14	7	6	1	507	457	110.9	30	
8	Casey	14	6	8	0	497	435	114.3	24	
9	Essendon	14	6	8	0	473	501	94.4	24	
10	Northern Territory	14	5	9	0	442	664	66.6	20	
11	Darebin	14	4	10	0	366	553	66.2	16	
12	Carlton	14	3	10	1	398	563	70.7	14	
13	Williamstown	14	1	13	0	211	691	30.5	4	

Source: SportsTG
Rules for classification: 1) points; 2) percentage; 3) number of points for.
(P) Premiers

== Finals series ==
=== Qualifying and Elimination finals ===
	Qualifying Final
Saturday 31 August (12:00 pm)	Collingwood 3.3 (21)	def.	Southern Saints 1.0 (6)	Victoria Park

	First Elimination Final
Saturday 31 August (11:45 am)	Melbourne University 9.2 (56)	def.	Geelong Cats 6.7 (43)	ETU Stadium

	Second Elimination Final
Sunday 1 September (11:45 am)	Western Bulldogs 6.0 (36)	def.	Richmond 4.7 (31)	ETU Stadium

=== Semi-finals ===
	First Semi-Final
Saturday 7 September (2:40 pm)	Collingwood 1.8 (14)	def. by	Western Bulldogs 4.2 (26)	ETU Stadium

	Second Semi-Final
Sunday 8 September (11:45 am)	Southern Saints 10.5 (65)	def.	Melbourne University 7.6 (48)	ETU Stadium

=== Preliminary final ===
	Preliminary Final
Sunday 15 September (11:45 am)	Collingwood 7.5 (47)	def.	Southern Saints 5.3 (33)	ETU Stadium

=== Grand Final ===
2019 VFLW Grand Final
Sunday 22 September (11:35 am)	Western Bulldogs	def. by	Collingwood	Ikon Park
0.1 (1); 2.1 (13); 2.1 (13); 2.3 (15)	Q1; Q2; Q3; Final	2.6 (18); 2.6 (18); 5.9 (39); 7.10 (52)	Lisa Hardeman Medal: Stacey Livingstone (Collingwood); Television broadcast: Seven Network
E. Mackay, S. Molan 1	Goals	J. Lambert, S. Alexander 2 M. Cann, G. Lagioia, C. Molloy 1
B. Lochland, E. Gavalas, K. Lamb, N. Ferres, S. Ruedin, A. Guest	Best	S. Livingstone, J. Lambert, G. Lagioia, S. Layton, N. Xenos, B. Davey

== Awards ==
- Lambert-Pearce Medal (Best and Fairest): Lauren Pearce (Darebin)
- Rohenna Young Medal (Leading Goal kicker): Jaimee Lambert (Collingwood) – 21 goals
- Debbie Lee Medal (Rising Star): Olivia Vesely (Southern Saints)
- Coach of the Year: Tom Hunter (Richmond)
- Lisa Hardeman Medal (Best on ground VFL Women's Grand Final): Stacey Livingstone (Collingwood)

2019 VFL Women's Team of the Year
B:	Jayde Van Dyk (Hawthorn)	Stacey Livingstone (Collingwood)	Tilly Lucas-Rodd (Southern Saints)
HB:	Libby Birch (Casey)	Rebecca Miller (Richmond)	Rebecca Webster (Geelong)
C:	Jenna Bruton (Melbourne Uni)	Jasmine Garner (Williamstown)	Bianca Jakobsson (Casey)
HF:	Jaimee Lambert (Collingwood)	Kate Gillespie-Jones (Melbourne Uni)	Phoebe McWilliams (Hawthorn)
F:	Tayla Stahl (Richmond)	Caitlin Greiser (Southern Saints)	Ash Riddell (Melbourne Uni)
Foll:	Lauren Pearce (c) (Darebin)	Rebecca Beeson (Hawthorn)	Georgia Nanscawen (Essendon)
Int:	Monique Conti (Richmond)	Amy McDonald (Geelong)	Olivia Vesely (Southern Saints)
Int:	Danica Pedersen (Richmond)	Rosie Dillon (Hawthorn)	Ellie Gavalas (Western Bulldogs)
Coach:	Tom Hunter (Richmond)		
