= Hayley Trevean =

Australian rules footballer (born 1988)

Personal information
- Born: bendigo
- Original team: Bendigo (VFL Women's)
- Draft: 2016 AFL Women's draft#2016 free agent: Carlton
- Debut: Round 7, 2017, Carlton vs. Brisbane, at Ikon Park
- Height: 167 cm (5 ft 6 in)
- Position: Midfielder

Playing career^{1}
Years	Club	Games (Goals)
2017	Carlton	1 (0)
2019	Geelong	5 (0)
Total		6(0)
- ^{1} Playing statistics correct to the end of the 2019 season.

Hayley Trevean (born 10 August 1988) is an Australian rules footballer who played for Geelong in the AFL Women's competition (AFLW). She was recruited by Carlton as a free agent following the 2016 AFL Women's draft. She made her debut in Carlton's final match of 2017, in round 7 against Brisbane at Ikon Park. She was subsequently delisted at season's end. Hayley played the 2018 season with the Geelong Cats VFLW team, and was listed in their inaugural AFLW team for 2019.
