= Paul Hood (coach) =

Australian rules footballer and coach

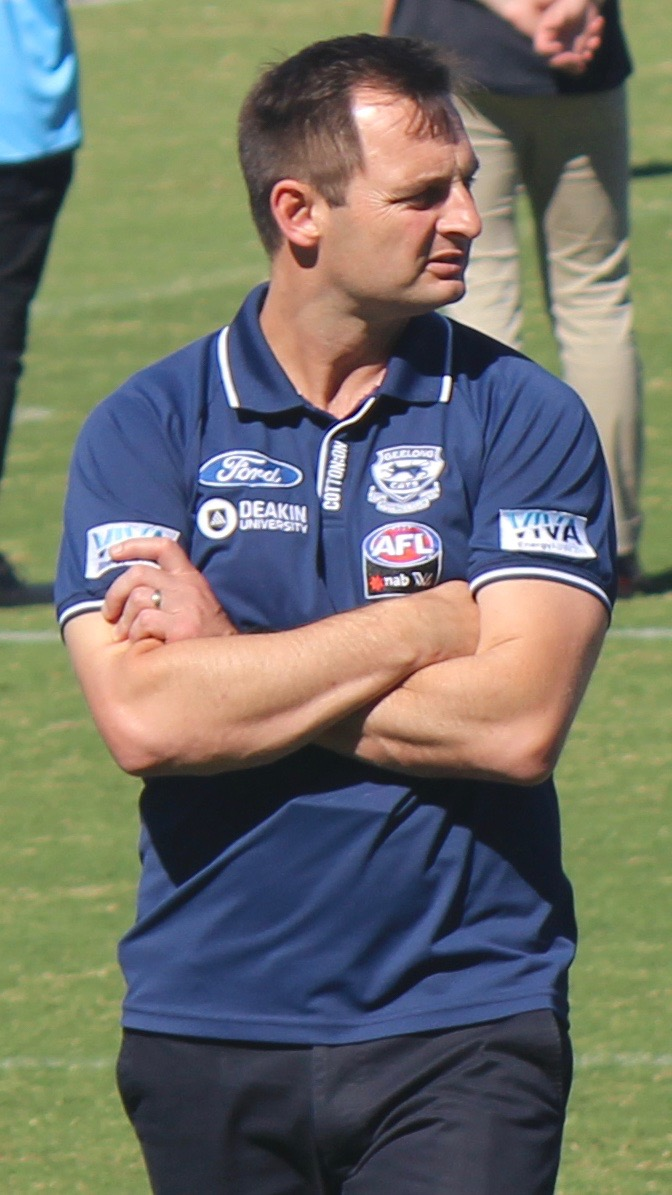
- Hood in 2019

Personal information
- Original team: Geelong Falcons (TAC Cup)

Coaching career^{3}
Years	Club	Games (W–L–D)
2019–2021	Geelong (W)	23 (6–17–0)
- ^{3} Coaching statistics correct as of the 2021 season.

Career highlights
- Morrish Medal: 1995

Paul Hood is a former Australian rules footballer and coach. He was the inaugural senior coach of the Geelong Football Club in the AFL Women's (AFLW).

Hood played for the Geelong Falcons in the TAC Cup as a junior. He won the 1995 Morrish Medal as the best and fairest player in the competition, receiving 26 votes. Hood went on to represent North Ballarat Football Club and Geelong in the Victorian Football League (VFL), and St Joseph's Football Club in the Geelong Football League.

He returned to the Falcons in 2010 as their coach and became Geelong's VFL coach for 2015. In 2016, he became the club's player development manager and visited Elcho Island to scout potential players. Hood was named coach of Geelong's new VFL Women's side for 2017 and oversaw the team through their transfer to the AFLW competition in 2019. In May 2021, after winning only one match in the 2021 AFL Women's season, Hood resigned from his position as head coach of Geelong.
