= Anna Teague =

Australian rules footballer

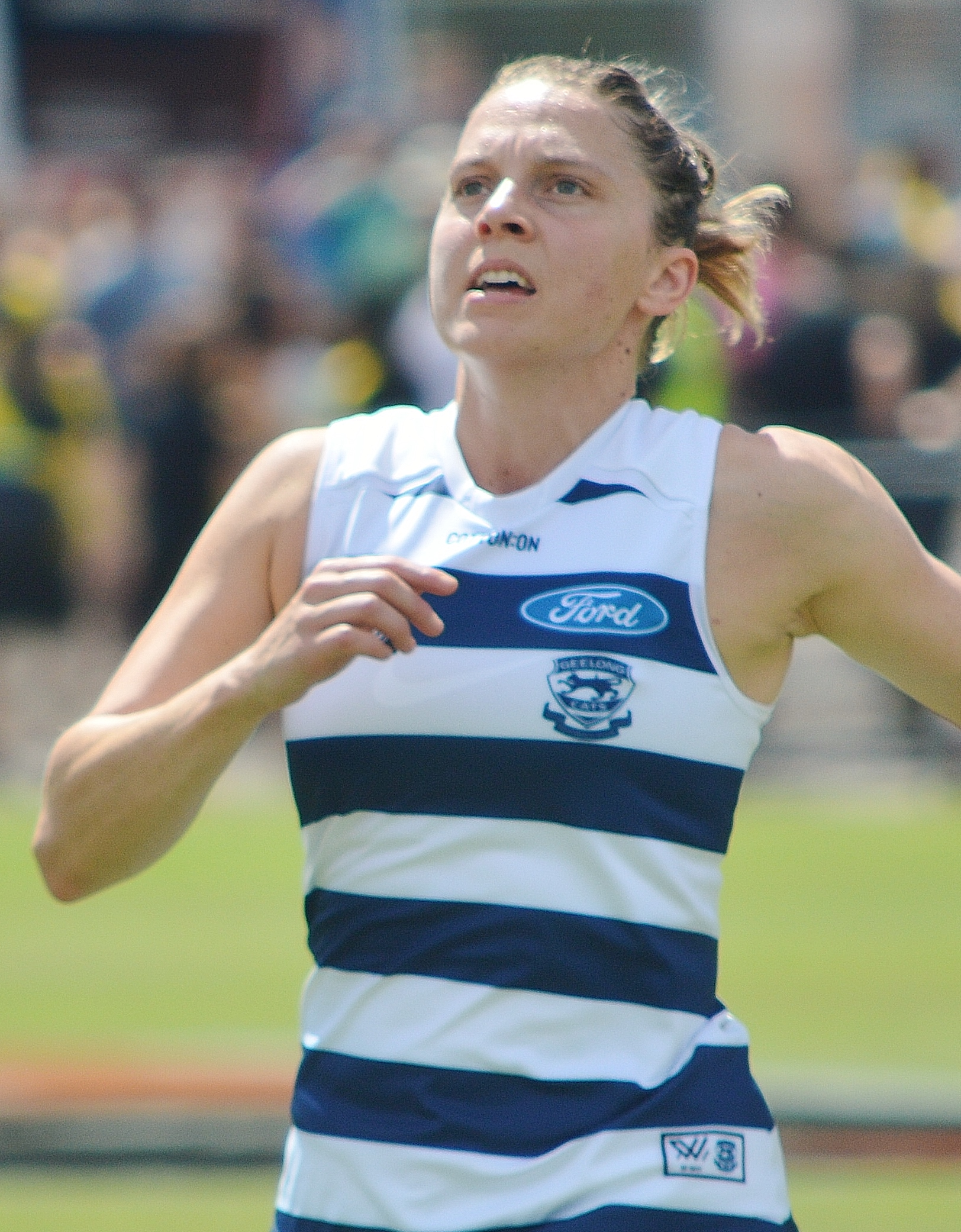
- Teague with Geelong in February 2020

Personal information
- Born: 8 December 1987 (age 38)
- Draft: No. 6, 2017 AFL Women's rookie draft
- Debut: Round 4, 2018, Melbourne vs. Collingwood, at TIO Traeger Park
- Height: 173 cm (5 ft 8 in)
- Position: Defender

Playing career^{1}
| Years | Club | Games (Goals) |
| 2018 | Melbourne | 4 (0) |
| 2019–2020 | Geelong | 9 (2) |
| Total | | 13 (2) |
- ^{1} Playing statistics correct to the end of the 2020 season.

Anna Teague (born 8 December 1987) is a retired Australian rules footballer who played for Melbourne and Geelong in the AFL Women's (AFLW).

== AFLW career ==
=== Melbourne ===
Teague was drafted by Melbourne with the club's first selection and the sixth pick overall in the 2017 AFL Women's rookie draft. She made her debut in a 34-point loss to Collingwood at TIO Traeger Park in round 4 of the 2018 season.

=== Geelong ===
In May 2018, Teague accepted an offer from expansion club Geelong to play with the club in the 2019 season. In August 2020, Teague announced her retirement from football.
