= Maddie Boyd =

Australian rules footballer

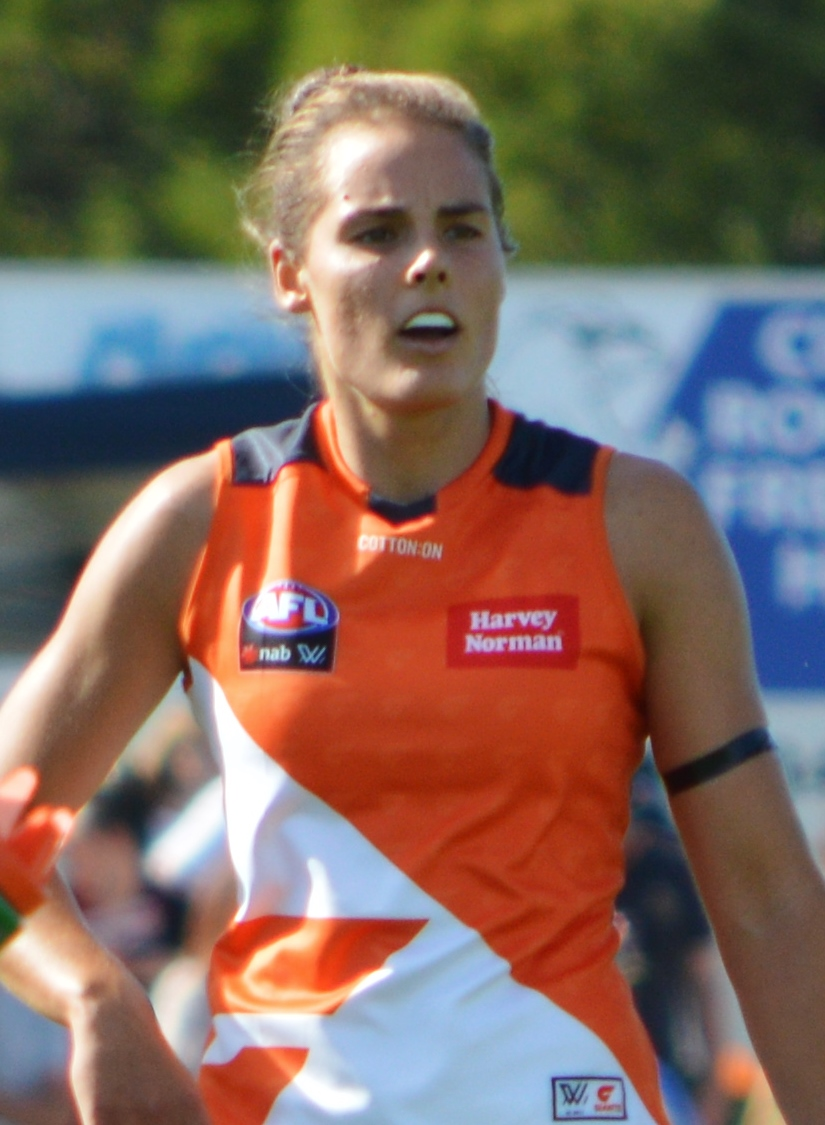
- Boyd with Greater Western Sydney in February 2018

Personal information
- Born: 20 March 1993 (age 33)
- Original team: North Geelong Football Club (GDFL)
- Draft: No. 120, 2016 AFL Women's draft
- Debut: Round 1, 2017, Melbourne vs. Brisbane, at Casey Fields
- Height: 178 cm (5 ft 10 in)
- Position: Ruck / forward

Club information
- Current club: St Kilda
- Number: 29

Playing career^{1}
Years	Club	Games (Goals)
2017	Melbourne	7 (0)
2018	Greater Western Sydney	2 (0)
2019–2021	Geelong	13 (4)
2023–	St Kilda	8 (1)
Total		30 (5)
- ^{1} Playing statistics correct to the end of the 2023 season.

Madeleine Boyd (born 20 March 1993) is an Australian rules footballer who played for St Kilda in the AFL Women's (AFLW). She has previously played for Melbourne, Greater Western Sydney and Geelong.

Boyd was drafted by Melbourne with their fifteenth selection and 120th overall in the 2016 AFL Women's draft. She made her debut in the fifteen point loss to Brisbane at Casey Fields in the opening round of the 2017 season. She played every match in her debut season to finish with seven games.

After one season with Melbourne, Boyd was traded to Greater Western Sydney during the 2017 trade period.

In May 2018 Boyd accepted an offer from expansion club Geelong to play with the club in the 2019 AFLW season, becoming the first player to play for three AFLW clubs. She kicked Geelong's first ever goal in their inaugural game. She was delisted by Geelong at the conclusion of the 2021 AFL Women's season.

Ahead of the 2023 season, Boyd joined St Kilda as a replacement player.

Boyd has studied a Bachelor of Exercise Sport Science at Deakin University.
