= Georgia Clarke =

Australian rules footballer

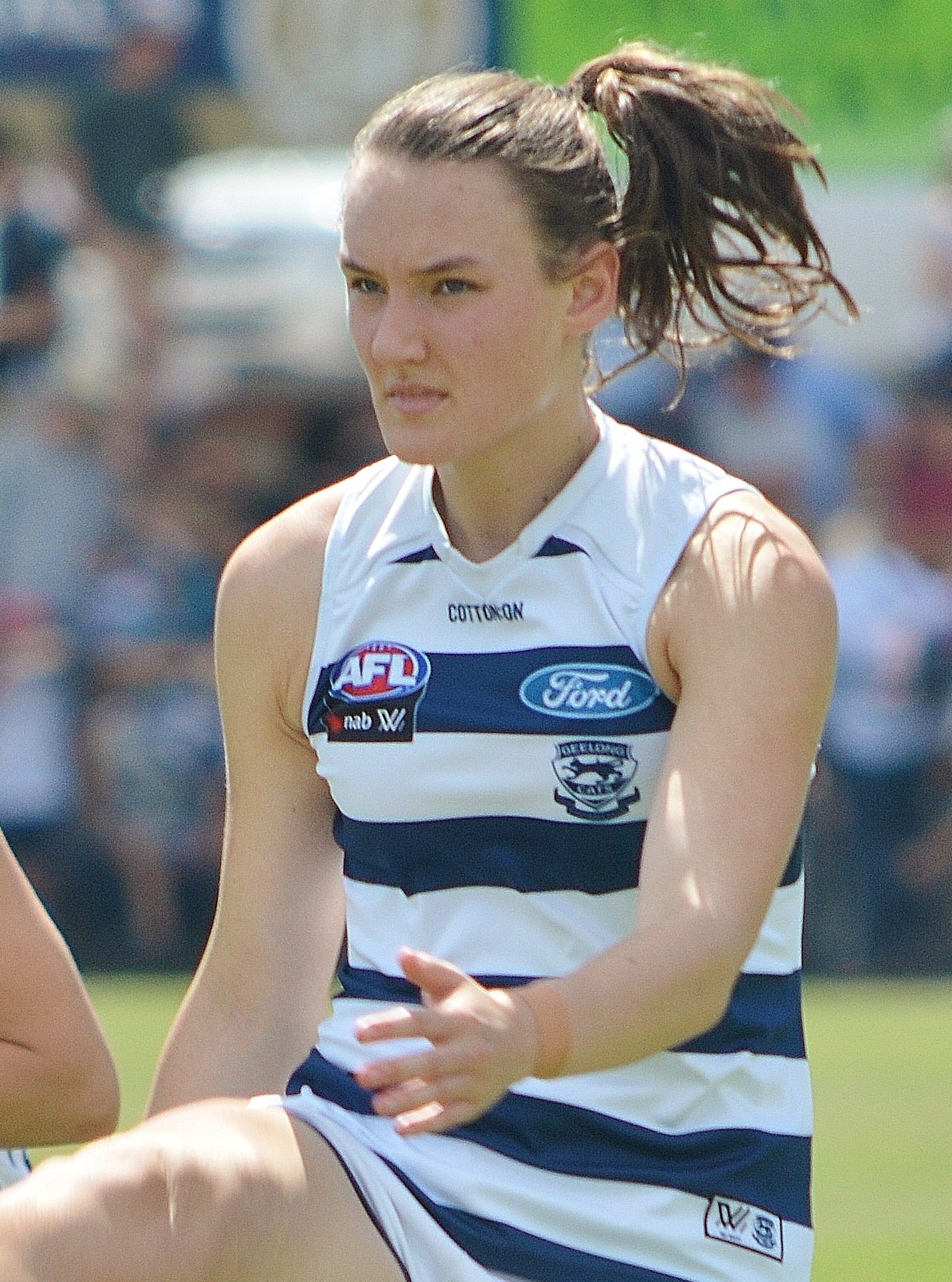
- Clarke with Geelong in February 2020

Personal information
- Born: 23 June 2000 (age 26)
- Original team: Greater Western Victoria U18
- Draft: No. 24, 2018 national draft
- Debut: Round 2, 2019, Geelong vs. Western Bulldogs, at Whitten Oval
- Height: 177 cm (5 ft 10 in)
- Position: Defender

Club information
- Current club: Essendon

Playing career^{1}
Years	Club	Games (Goals)
2019–S7 (2022)	Geelong	19 (8)
2023–	Essendon	11 (1)
Total		30 (9)
- ^{1} Playing statistics correct to the end of the 2023 season.

Georgia Clarke (born 23 June 2000) is an Australian rules footballer who plays for Essendon in the AFL Women's (AFLW). She has previously played for Geelong.

== AFLW career ==
Clarke was drafted by Geelong with selection number 24 in the 2018 AFL Women's draft, and made her AFLW debut during the second round of the 2019 season, kicking a goal also while playing in the backline, against Western Bulldogs at Whitten Oval.

In March 2023, Clarke was delisted by Geelong. The following week she was signed by Essendon as a delisted free agent.

In the Dreamtime game in Darwin, Clarke kicked her first goal for Bombers from a tight angle in the forward pocket.

== Personal life ==
Clarke currently studies a Bachelor of Occupational Therapy at Deakin University.

Has a younger sister Lucy who pursued a life outside of AFLW.
