= Maddy McMahon =

Australian rules footballer

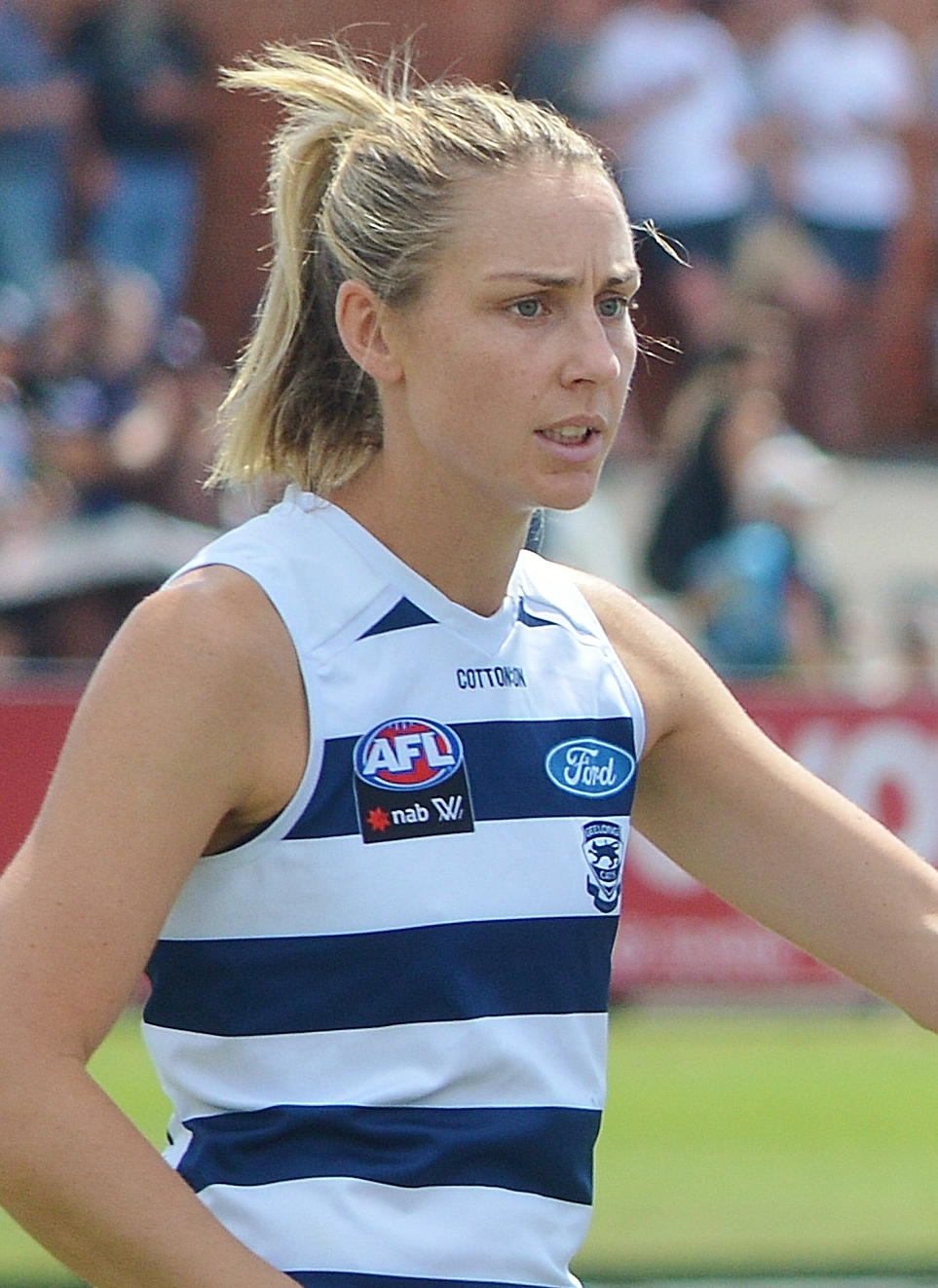
- McMahon with Geelong in February 2020

Personal information
- Full name: Madaleine McMahon
- Born: 10 April 1989 (age 37)
- Debut: Round 1, 2019, Geelong vs. Collingwood, at GMHBA Stadium
- Height: 175 cm (5 ft 9 in)

Playing career^{1}
Years	Club	Games (Goals)
2019–S7 (2022)	Geelong	32 (0)
- ^{1} Playing statistics correct to the end of the S7 (2022) season.

Madaleine McMahon (born 10 April 1989) is a retired Australian rules footballer who played for the Geelong Football Club in the AFL Women's (AFLW).

McMahon was recruited by Geelong as a cross-code rookie prior to the club's inaugural season in the AFLW, having previously played basketball with the Australian Institute of Sport in the Women's National Basketball League (WNBL), and also the Geelong Supercats. McMahon also played netball in local leagues prior to joining Geelong's VFL Women's football team in 2018, and has three children. McMahon made her AFLW debut during the first round of the 2019 season, against Collingwood at GMHBA Stadium.

In March 2023, McMahon retired, after four seasons playing and one spent on the inactive list.

McMahon is currently studying a Master of Teaching (Primary) at Deakin University.
