= Maighan Fogas =

Australian rules footballer

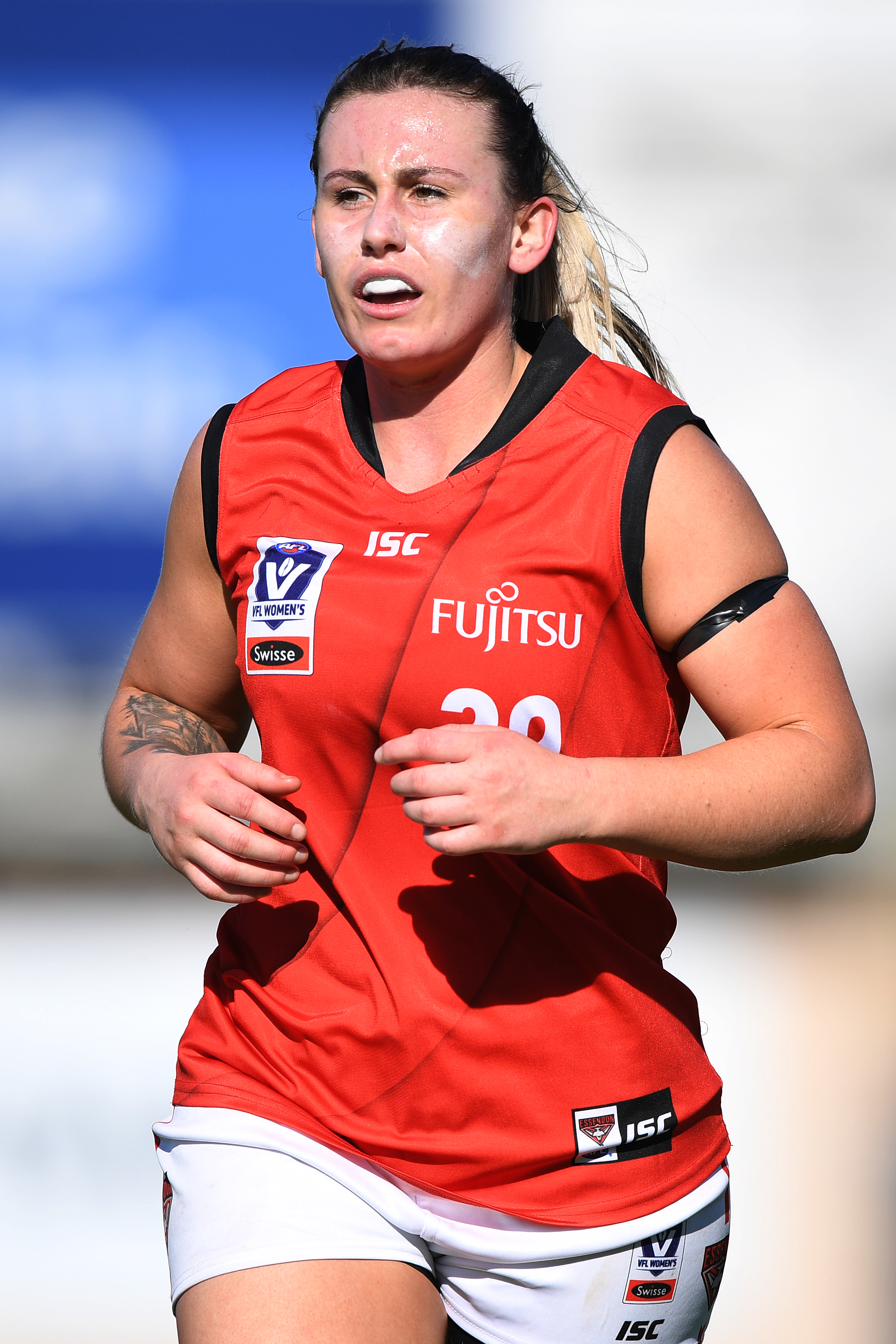
- Fogas in June 2019

Personal information
- Born: 10 October 1995 (age 31); Clunes Vic
- Original team: Geelong (VFLW)
- Draft: No. 47, 2018 national draft
- Debut: Round 1, 2019, Geelong vs. Collingwood, at GMHBA Stadium
- Height: 162 cm (5 ft 4 in)
- Position: Midfield

Playing career^{1}
Years	Club	Games (Goals)
2019	Geelong	1 (0)
- ^{1} Playing statistics correct to the end of the 2019 season.

Maighan Fogas (born 10 October 1995) is an Australian rules footballer who played with the Geelong Football Club in the AFL Women's (AFLW).

Fogas lives in Clunes, Victoria and is one of five siblings. Despite being listed with Geelong in the VFL Women's (VFLW) competition in 2017, Fogas was not selected for a single game and instead played with Redan Football Club in a local league. The following season, however, Fogas played 17 games in the VFLW and finished second in Geelong's best and fairest award.

Fogas was subsequently drafted with selection number 47 by Geelong in the 2018 AFL Women's draft, and made her AFLW debut during the first round of the 2019 season, against Collingwood at GMHBA Stadium. She was delisted at the end of the 2019 season, after only playing a single game.

Fogas is currently studying a Diploma of Health Sciences at Deakin University.
