= Kate Darby =

Australian rules footballer

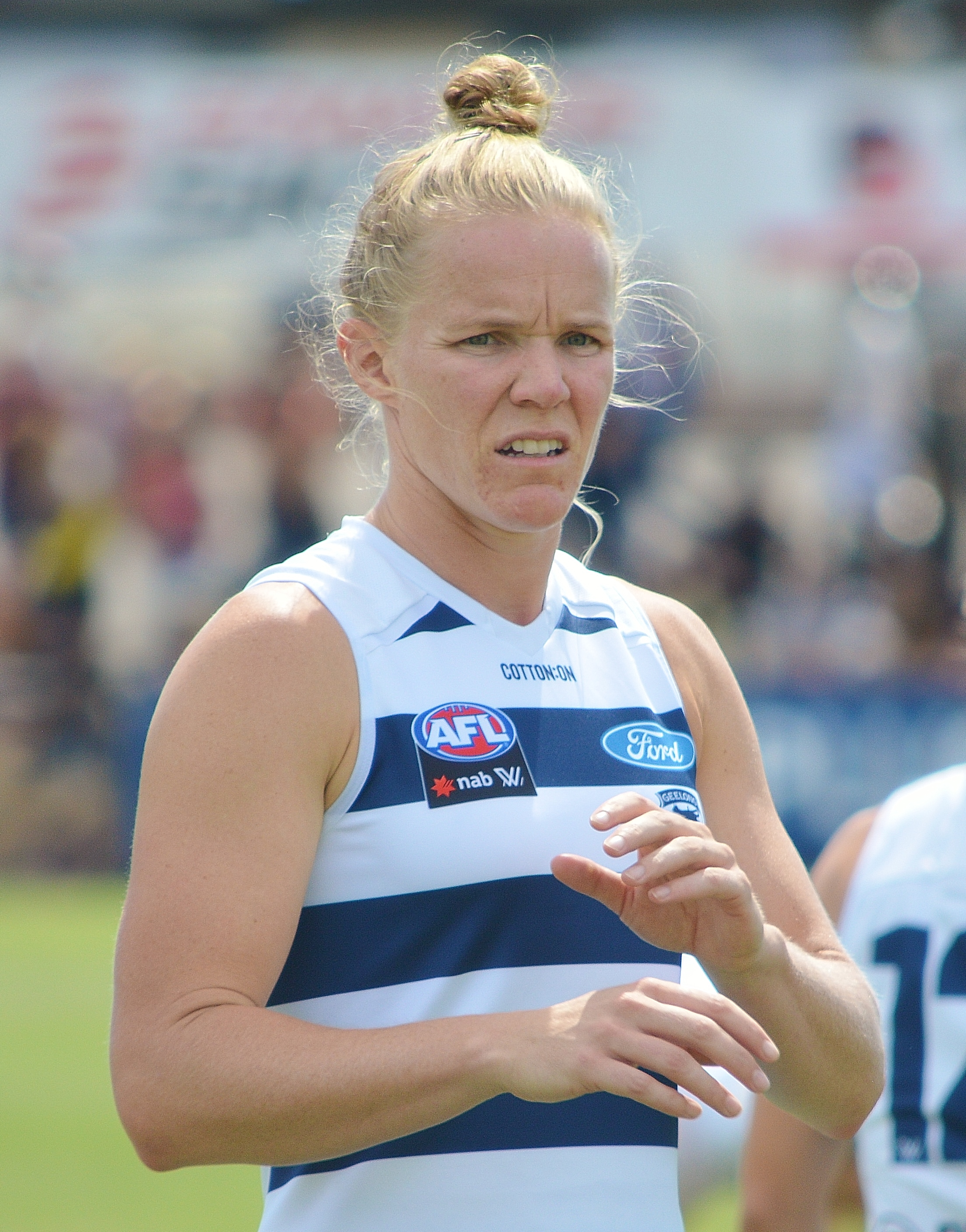
- Darby with Geelong in February 2020

Personal information
- Born: 18 November 1990 (age 35)
- Draft: No. 126, 2016 AFL Women's draft
- Debut: Round 2, 2017, Carlton vs. Greater Western Sydney, at Ikon Park
- Height: 180 cm (5 ft 11 in)
- Position: Defender / Forward

Playing career^{1}
Years	Club	Games (Goals)
2017	Carlton	2 (0)
2019–	Geelong	57 (17)
Total		59 (17)
- ^{1} Playing statistics correct to the end of the 2025 season.

Kate Darby (born 18 November 1990) is an Australian rules footballer who played for the Carlton Football Club in the AFL Women's competition (AFLW). She was drafted by Carlton with the club's sixteenth selection and the one hundred and twenty sixth overall in the 2016 AFL Women's draft. She made her debut in round 2, 2017, in a match against Greater Western Sydney at Ikon Park. She was dropped from the team the following week, however, and would not return until the final match of the season in round 7. She was subsequently delisted at season's end.

In May 2018 Darby accepted an offer from expansion club Geelong to play with the club in the 2019 AFLW season. In June 2021, she was delisted by Geelong.

In December 2021, Darby returned to the Geelong AFLW squad as a replacement player for Renee Garing. Darby was awarded the Hoops Award at the 2022 Geelong AFLW awards. The Hoops Award is awarded to the player making the best values based contribution to the club, and voted on by players, AFLW staff and coaches.
