= Denby Taylor =

Australian rules footballer

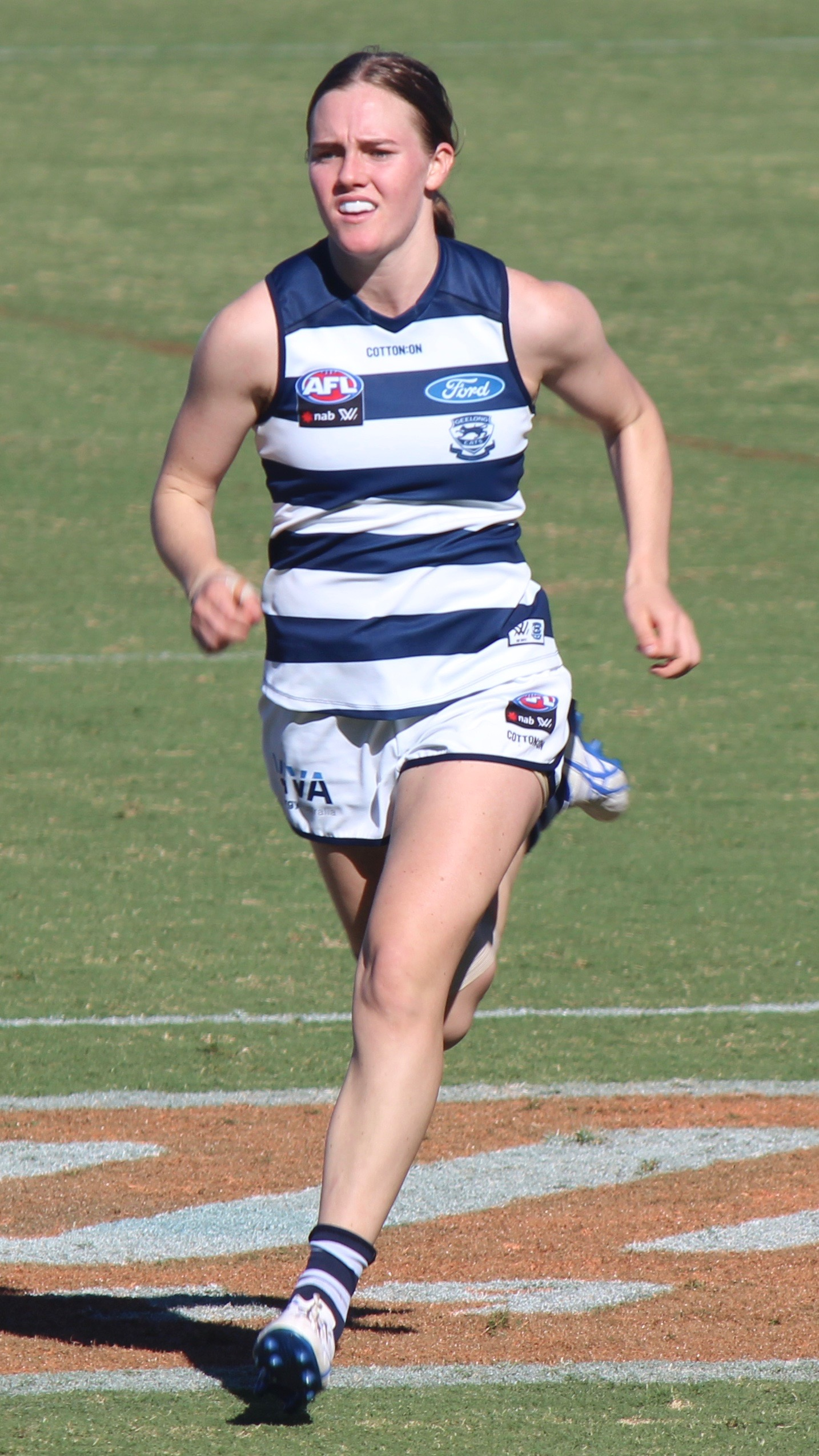
- Taylor in 2019

Personal information
- Born: 16 February 2000 (age 26)
- Original team: Geelong U18
- Draft: No. 20, 2018 national draft
- Debut: Round 1, 2019, Geelong vs. Collingwood, at GMHBA Stadium
- Height: 170 cm (5 ft 7 in)
- Position: Defender

Playing career^{1}
Years	Club	Games (Goals)
2019–2022	Geelong	18 (0)
2024–2025	Melbourne	11 (0)
- ^{1} Playing statistics correct to the end of the 2025 season.

Denby Taylor (born 19 February 2000) is an Australian rules footballer who last played with Melbourne in the AFL Women's (AFLW). She previously played with Geelong.

Taylor grew up in Geelong, Victoria with her parents, Pete and Pauline, and three older sisters, Casey, Dom, and Jordan. She attended Sacred Heart College, and played football at the junior level with Newtown & Chilwell Football Club. Taylor played with the Geelong Falcons in the TAC Cup in 2017 and 2018, winning the premiership in the latter year, and was named in the league's "Team of the Year" in both seasons.

Taylor was subsequently drafted with selection number 20 in the 2018 AFL Women's draft by Geelong, and made her AFLW debut during the first round of the 2019 season, against Collingwood at GMHBA Stadium.

In June 2022, Taylor retired from football, following a season on the inactive list.

Taylor returned to football during the 2024 season, playing with Geelong in the VFL Women's competition. She was then signed by Melbourne as an injury replacement player on the eve of the 2024 AFL Women's season.

In two seasons with the Demons, Taylor made a further 11 AFLW appearances before she was delisted at the end of the 2025 AFL Women's season.
