= Cassie Blakeway =

Australian rules footballer

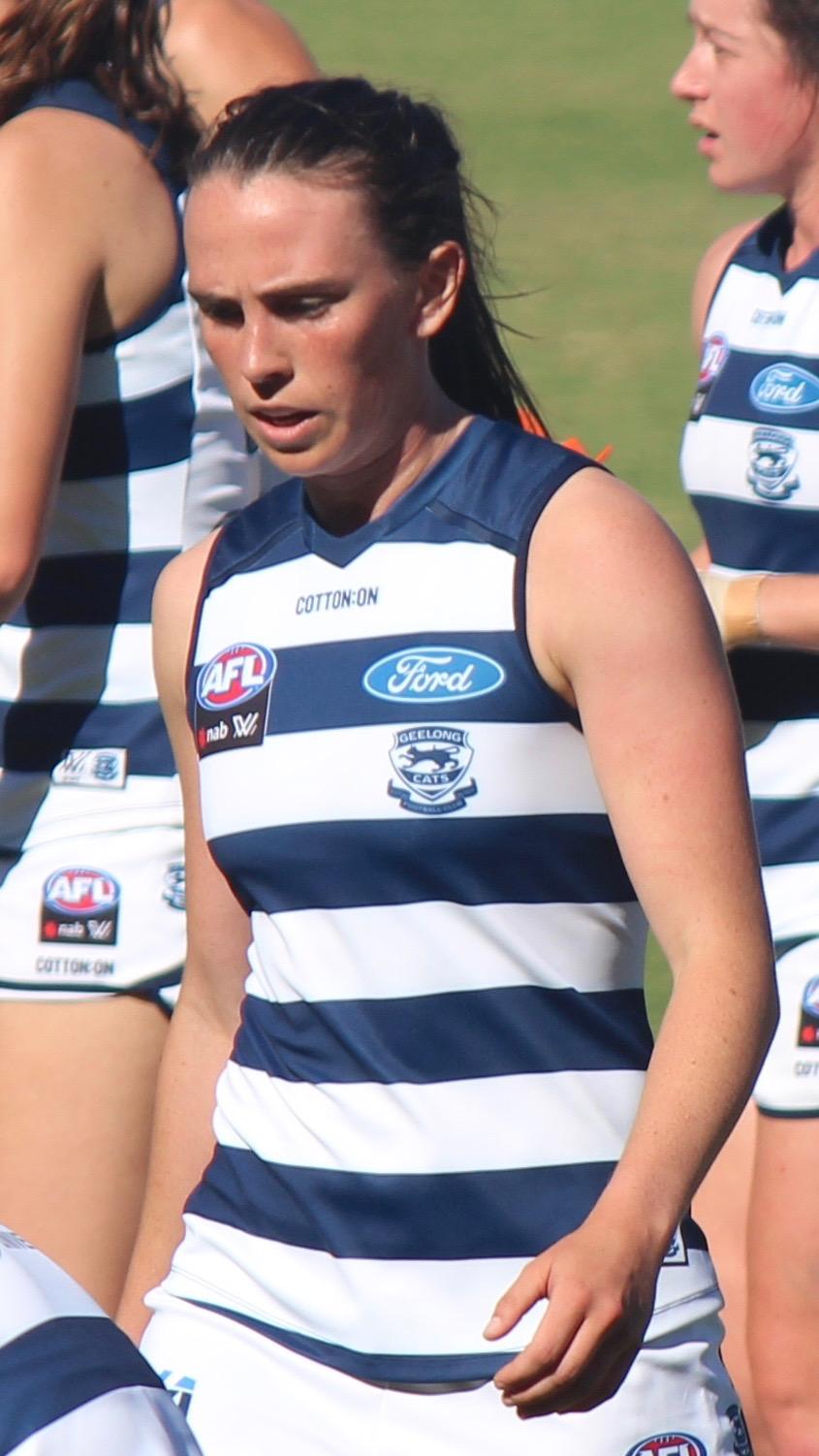
- Blakeway in 2019

Personal information
- Born: 18 April 1993 (age 33)
- Original team: Geelong (VFLW)
- Debut: Round 1, 2019, Geelong vs. Collingwood, at GMHBA Stadium
- Height: 174 cm (5 ft 9 in)

Playing career^{1}
Years	Club	Games (Goals)
2019–2020	Geelong	8 (0)
- ^{1} Playing statistics correct to the end of the 2020 season.

Cassie Blakeway (born 18 April 1993) is an Australian rules footballer who played for the Geelong Football Club in the AFL Women's (AFLW).

== AFLW career ==
Blakeway was recruited directly from Geelong's VFL Women's team prior to the club's inaugural season in the AFLW. Blakeway made her AFLW debut during the first round of the 2019 season, against Collingwood at GMHBA Stadium. In August 2020, Geelong delisted Blakeway.

== Personal life ==
Blakeway was a junior Victorian softball representative, and studied a master's degree in teaching at Deakin University.
