= Jordan Ivey =

Australian rules footballer

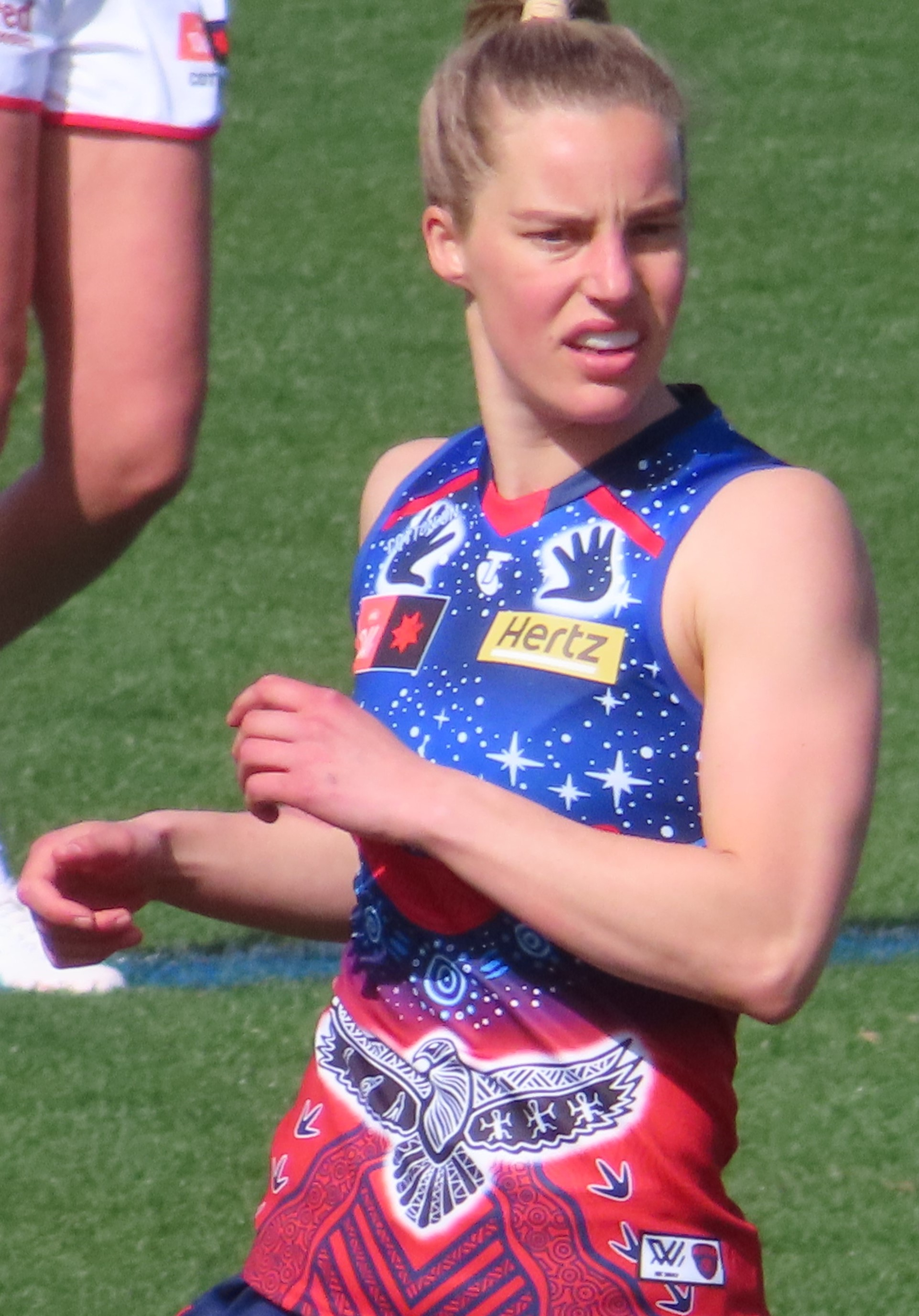
- Jordan Ivey in 2022

Personal information
- Born: 29 October 1992 (age 34)
- Debut: Round 6, 2017, Carlton vs. Fremantle, at Domain Stadium
- Position: Forward

Playing career^{1}
Years	Club	Games (Goals)
2017	Carlton	2 (1)
2019–2022	Geelong	31 (1)
S7 (2022)–2023	Melbourne	6 (0)
2024	Collingwood	6 (0)
Total		45 (2)
- ^{1} Playing statistics correct to the end of the 2024 season.

Jordan Ivey (born 29 October 1992) is an Australian rules footballer who plays for Collingwood in the VFL Women's competition (VFLW). She previously played in the AFL Women's (AFLW) for Carlton, Geelong, Melbourne, and Collingwood.

== AFL Women's career ==
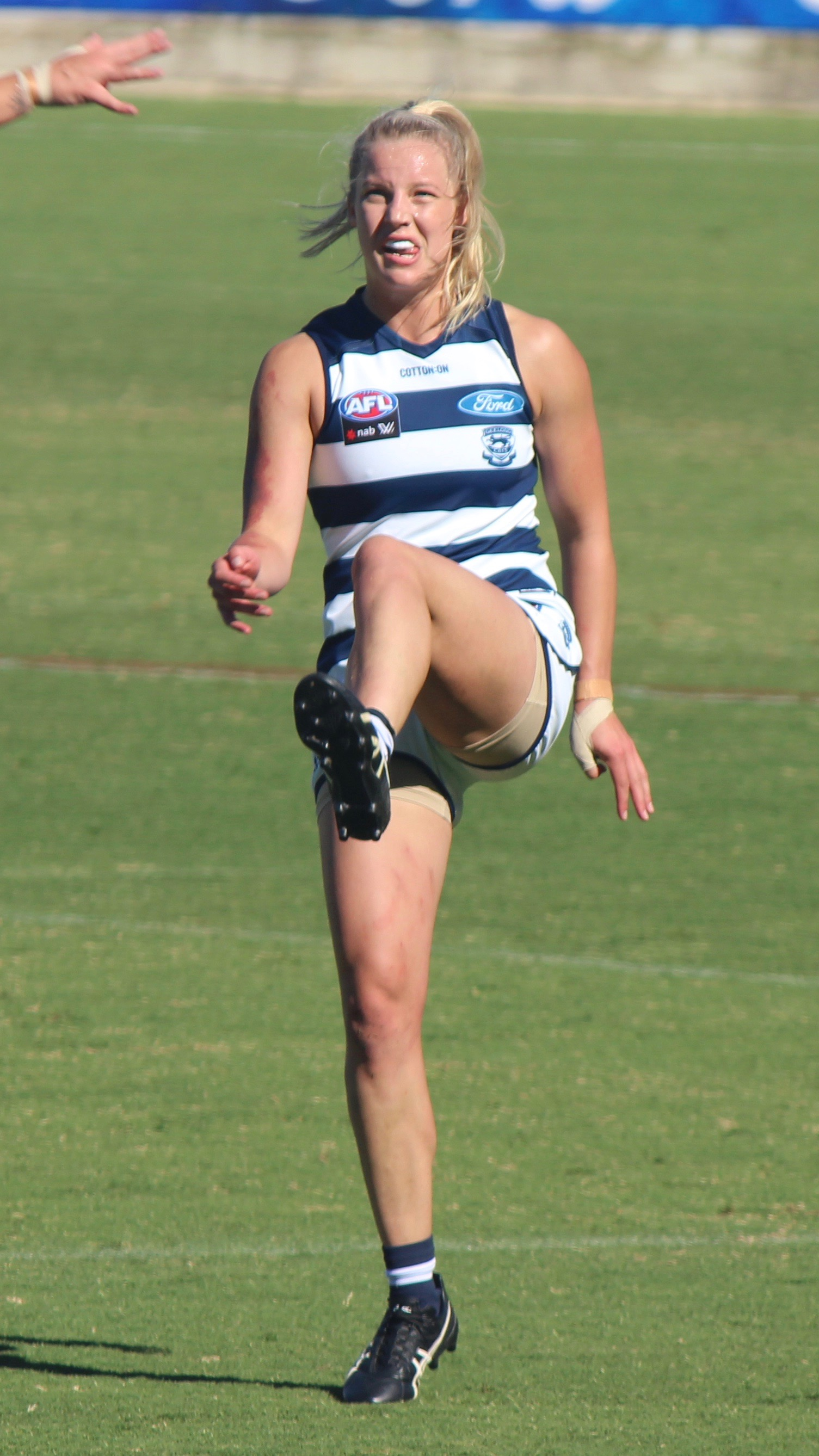
Jordan Ivey in 2019

She was recruited by Carlton Football Club as an injury replacement player mid-way through the 2017 season. She made her debut in Carlton's round 6, 2017 match against Fremantle at Domain Stadium. She was delisted at season's end after having played two matches.

In May 2018 Ivey accepted an offer from expansion club Geelong to play with the club in the 2019 AFLW season. She has since played 31 games for the club and was vice-captain in 2021. On 2 June 2022, Ivey was traded to Melbourne. Despite a positive season by Ivey, she was delisted by Melbourne.

In September 2024, after spending time with their VFLW squad, Ivey was signed to an AFLW contract for Collingwood, following injuries to Annie Lee and Imogen Evans. Following her time in the AFLW, Ivey returned to Collingwood's VFLW side.

== Statistics ==
Statistics are correct the end of the 2024 season.

Legend
G	Goals	K	Kicks	D	Disposals	T	Tackles
B	Behinds	H	Handballs	M	Marks

Season	Team	No.	Games	Totals							Averages (per game)						
Season	Team	No.	Games	G	B	K	H	D	M	T	G	B	K	H	D	M	T
2017	Carlton	28	2	1	0	10	3	13	4	6	0.5	0.0	5.0	1.5	6.5	2.0	3.0
2019	Geelong	5	8	0	4	36	22	58	17	33	0.0	0.5	4.5	2.8	7.3	2.1	4.1
2020	Geelong	5	5	0	0	30	17	47	6	24	0.0	0.0	6.0	3.4	9.4	1.2	4.8
2021	Geelong	5	8	0	1	57	13	70	14	25	0.0	0.1	7.1	1.6	8.8	1.8	3.1
2022 (S6)	Geelong	5	10	1	3	41	21	62	15	15	0.1	0.3	4.1	2.1	6.2	1.5	1.5
2022 (S7)	Melbourne	19	3	0	0	8	6	14	3	4	0.0	0.0	2.7	2.0	4.7	1.0	1.3
2023	Melbourne	19	3	0	0	11	4	15	3	4	0.0	0.0	3.7	1.3	5.0	1.0	1.3
2024	Collingwood	37	6	0	1	38	12	50	12	10	0.0	0.2	6.3	2.0	8.3	2.0	1.7
Career			45	2	9	231	98	329	74	121	0.04	0.2	5.1	2.2	7.3	1.6	2.7
