= Danielle Higgins =

Australian rules footballer

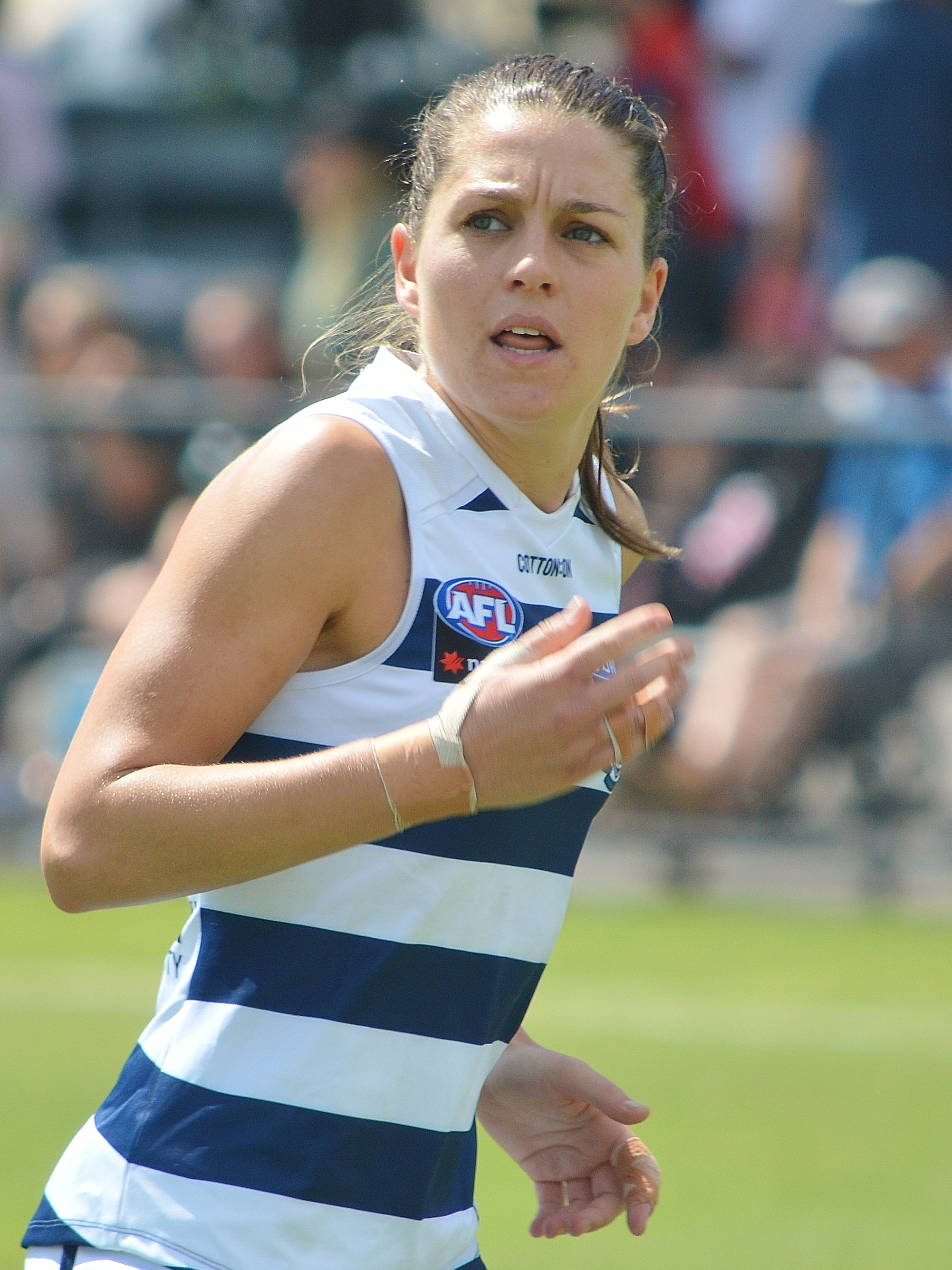
- Higgins with Geelong in February 2020

Personal information
- Born: 14 March 1990 (age 36)
- Original team: Geelong (VFLW)
- Debut: Round 1, 2019, Geelong vs. Collingwood, at GMHBA Stadium
- Height: 169 cm (5 ft 7 in)
- Other occupation: Teacher

Playing career^{1}
Years	Club	Games (Goals)
2019–2022 (S6)	Geelong	24 (6)
- ^{1} Playing statistics correct to the end of 2022 season 6.

Danielle Higgins (born 14 March 1990, previously known as Danielle Orr) is a retired Australian rules footballer who played for the Geelong Football Club in the AFL Women's (AFLW).

Higgins was recruited directly from Geelong's VFL Women's team prior to the club's inaugural season in the AFLW. She is the younger sister of Shaun Higgins, a footballer in the Australian Football League, and grew up in Hamlyn Heights, Victoria.

On 11 March 2022, Higgins announced her retirement from playing in the AFLW, and will finish her playing career at the end of the 2022 VFLW season.
