= Renee Garing =

Australian rules footballer

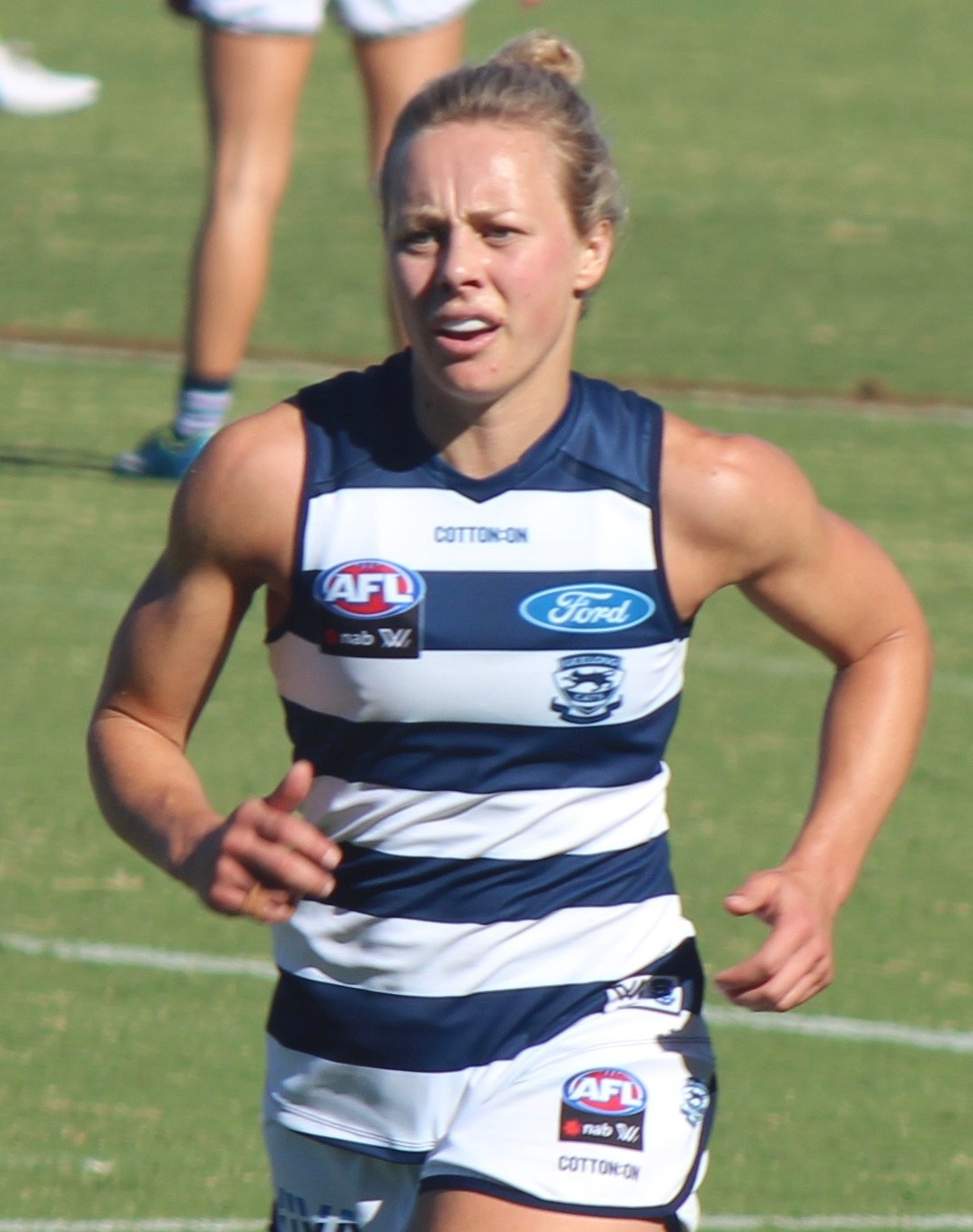
- Garing with Geelong in 2019

Personal information
- Born: 4 September 1988 (age 38)
- Original team: Geelong (VFL Women's)
- Debut: Round 1, 2019, Geelong vs. Collingwood, at GMHBA Stadium
- Height: 164 cm (5 ft 5 in)
- Position: Midfielder

Club information
- Current club: Geelong
- Number: 12

Playing career^{1}
Years	Club	Games (Goals)
2019–2021 & 2023	Geelong	33 (2)
- ^{1} Playing statistics correct to the end of the (2023) season.

Renee Garing (born 4 September 1988) is an Australian rules footballer with the Geelong Football Club in the AFL Women's (AFLW).

Garing was recruited directly from Geelong's VFL Women's team before the club's inaugural season in the AFLW. Before playing Australian rules football, she played netball with St Mary's–winning the league's best and fairest award three times. Garing made her AFLW debut during the first round of the 2019 season, against Collingwood at GMHBA Stadium. As well as playing football, Garing is a physical education teacher and is married to her husband, Tony.
