= Rebecca Webster =

Australian rules footballer

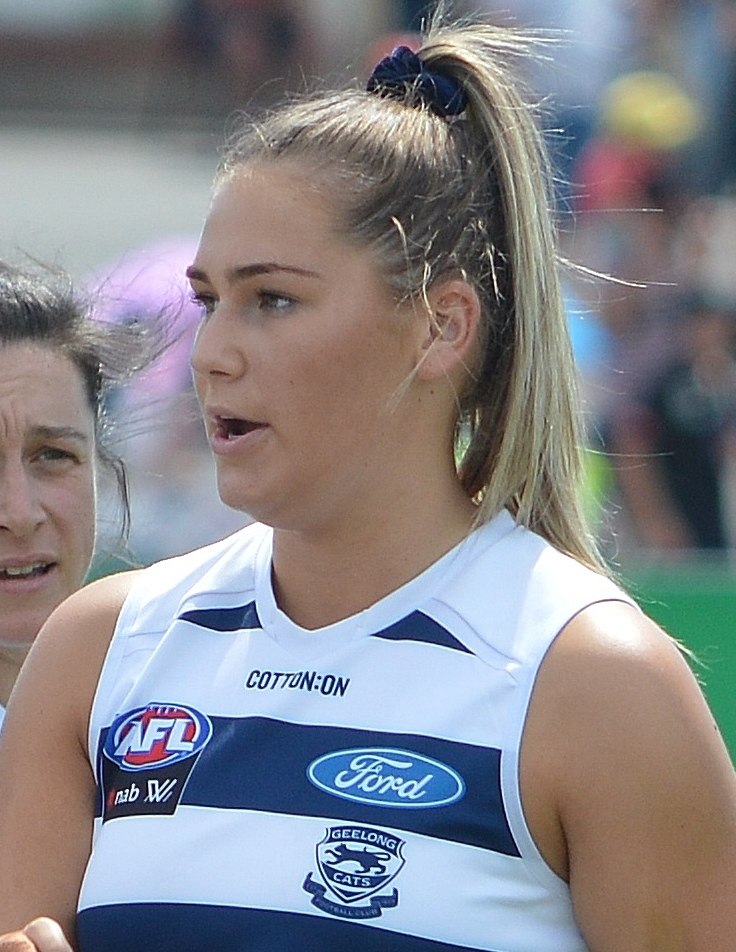
- Webster with Geelong in February 2020

Personal information
- Born: 22 October 2000 (age 26)
- Original team: Murray Bushrangers (NAB League Girls)
- Draft: No. 7, 2018 national draft
- Debut: Round 1, 2019, Geelong vs. Collingwood, at GMHBA Stadium
- Height: 172 cm (5 ft 8 in)
- Position: Defender

Club information
- Current club: Geelong
- Number: 21

Playing career^{1}
Years	Club	Games (Goals)
2019–	Geelong	73 (10)
- ^{1} Playing statistics correct to the end of the 2025 season.

Rebecca Webster (born 22 October 2000) is an Australian rules footballer with the Geelong Football Club in the AFL Women's (AFLW).

Webster played with Murray Bushrangers in the TAC Cup and Melbourne University in the VFL Women's (VFLW) competition. She was subsequently drafted with selection number seven by Geelong in the 2018 AFL Women's draft, and made her AFLW debut during the first round of the 2019 season, against Collingwood at GMHBA Stadium. She played only four games for Geelong in the 2019 AFLW season, though later that year won the club's VFL Women's best and fairest award.

Webster currently studies a Bachelor of Exercise and Sport Science/Bachelor of Business – Sport Management at Deakin University.

== Statistics ==
Updated to the end of 2022 season 7.

Legend
G	Goals	K	Kicks	D	Disposals	T	Tackles
B	Behinds	H	Handballs	M	Marks

Season	Team	No.	Games	Totals							Averages (per game)							Votes
Season	Team	No.	Games	G	B	K	H	D	M	T	G	B	K	H	D	M	T	Votes
2019	Geelong	21	4	0	1	11	15	26	4	4	0.0	0.0	5.0	7.7	12.7	1.0	1.0	0
2020	Geelong	21	6	0	0	40	37	77	21	16	0.0	0.0	6.7	6.2	12.9	3.5	2.7	0
2021	Geelong	21	9	2	3	88	48	136	22	25	0.2	0.3	9.8	5.3	15.1	2.4	2.8	0
2022 (S6)	Geelong	21	10	3	2	81	87	168	14	63	0.3	0.2	8.7	8.7	16.8	1.4	6.3	2
2022 (S7)	Geelong	21	11	2	4	113	81	194	26	40	0.2	0.4	10.3	7.4	17.6	2.4	3.6	5
Career			40	7	10	333	268	601	87	148	0.2	0.3	8.3	6.7	15.0	2.2	3.7	7
