= QFA (Northern Rivers) =

Defunct Australian rules football competition

Queensland Football Association - Northern Rivers Division
- Most recent season or competition: 2020
- First season: 2012
- Folded: 2021
- No. of teams: 4
- Last champion: Byron (2023)
- Most titles: Byron (5)

The Queensland Football Association Northern Rivers was an Australian rules football competition containing four clubs based in the Northern Rivers region of New South Wales and the southern area of the Gold Coast in Queensland. The league was initially known as the Summerland Australian Football League and was established in 1984 as a New South Wales-only competition involving clubs from Ballina, Byron Bay, Goonellabah and Lismore. The competition saw several clubs from the regions of the Northern Rivers, New England and the Mid North Coast come and go between the 1990s and early 2000s. In 2010 the league allowed entry to its first Queensland-based team, Coolangatta-Tweed Heads. In 2012 the remaining clubs joined the AFL Queensland umbrella and rebranded to the QAFA (B) South.

In 2016 the name of the division was changed to Northern Rivers.

During the seasons of 2016 and 2017 the clubs also played a series of matches against clubs from the AFL North Coast for premiership points.

== Clubs ==
Final

Club	Colours	Nickname	Home Ground	Former League	Est.	Years in QFANR	QFANR Senior Premierships		Fate
Club	Colours	Nickname	Home Ground	Former League	Est.	Years in QFANR	Flags	Years	Fate
Byron		Magpies	Cavanbah Centre, Byron Bay	SAFL	1984	2012-2020	16	2016, 2017, 2018, 2019, 2020	Moved to QFA Division 2 South following 2020 season
Ballina		Bombers	Fripp Oval, Ballina	SAFL	1984	2012-2020	0	-	Moved to QFA Division 2 South following 2020 season
Lismore		Swans	Gloria Mortimer Oval, Lismore	SAFL	1984	2012-2020	0	-	Moved to AFL North Coast following 2020 season
Tweed Coast		Tigers	Seabreeze Oval, Pottsville	SAFL	2009	2012-2020	3	2012, 2013, 2015	Moved to QFA Division 2 South following 2020 season

=== Former ===
Club	Colours	Nickname	Home Ground	Former League	Est.	Years in QFANR	QFANR Senior Premierships		Fate
Club	Colours	Nickname	Home Ground	Former League	Est.	Years in QFANR	Flags	Years	Fate
Bond University		Bullsharks	Bond University Oval, Robina	–	2011	2012-2014	1	2014	Moved to QFA A division following 2014 season
Carrara		Saints	Alan Nielsen Oval, Carrara	–	1998	2012-2013	0	-	Moved to QFA A division following 2013 season
Robina		Roos	Scottsdale Reserve, Robina	QAFL	1996	2013-2015	0	-	Moved to QFA South division following 2015 season

== Grand Final Results ==
Year	Premier	Score	Runner up	Score	Bob Hill Medal
2012	Tweed Coast Tigers	17.12. (114)	Bond University	9.16. (70)	
2013	Tweed Coast Tigers	9.5. (59)	Byron Magpies	6.6. (42)	Ash Gemmill
2014	Bond University	15.8. (98)	Tweed Coast Tigers	7.16. (58)	John Blackburn
2015	Tweed Coast Tigers	10.8. (68)	Byron Magpies	10.7. (67)	James Walle
2016	Byron Magpies	11.11. (77)	Ballina Bombers	6.5. (41)	
2017	Byron Magpies	12.18. (90)	Tweed Coast Tigers	6.3. (39)	Matthew Caris
2018	Byron Magpies	21.9. (135)	Ballina Bombers	4.6. (30)	
2019	Byron Magpies	12.10. (82)	Ballina Bombers	8.5. (53)	William McBride
2020	Byron Magpies	18.15. (123)	Tweed Coast Tigers	12.8. (80)	Gus Staley

== 2018 Ladder ==
QFA Northern Rivers	Wins	Byes	Losses	Draws	For	Against	%	Pts	Final	Team	G	B	Pts	Team	G	B	Pts
Byron Bay	12	0	4	0	1242	814	152.58%	48	1st Semi	Tweed Coast	10	8	68	Lismore	8	10	58
Ballina	10	0	6	0	1119	830	134.82%	40	2nd Semi	Byron Bay	14	16	100	Ballina	10	9	69
Tweed Coast	10	0	6	0	1204	923	130.44%	40	Preliminary	Ballina	11	8	74	Tweed Coast	10	12	72
Lismore	0	0	16	0	526	1524	34.51%	0	Grand	Byron Bay	21	9	135	Ballina	4	6	30

== 2019 Ladder ==
QFA Northern Rivers	Wins	Byes	Losses	Draws	For	Against	%	Pts	Final	Team	G	B	Pts	Team	G	B	Pts
Byron Bay	16	0	0	0	1305	606	215.35%	64	1st Semi	Lismore	11	12	78	Tweed Coast	10	15	75
Ballina	7	0	8	1	785	841	93.34%	30	2nd Semi	Byron Bay	13	14	92	Ballina	11	4	70
Tweed Coast	7	0	8	1	927	1049	88.37%	30	Preliminary	Ballina	14	11	95	Lismore	4	6	30
Lismore	0	0	14	2	631	1152	54.77%	4	Grand	Byron Bay	12	10	82	Ballina	8	5	53

== See also ==
- Australian rules football in New South Wales
- Australian Rules football in Queensland
- Summerland Australian Football League
