= 2018 AFL Women's draft =

Sixth women's draft organised by the Australian Football League

General information
- Date: 23 October 2018
- Time: 12:00 pm AEDT
- Location: Marvel Stadium
- Network: afl.com.au
- Sponsored by: National Australia Bank

Overview
- League: AFL Women's
- First selection: Nina Morrison (Geelong)

The 2018 AFL Women's (AFLW) draft consisted of the various periods when the ten clubs in the Australian rules football women's competition could recruit players prior to the competition's 2019 season.

As in the previous season, all player contracts are all capped at one-year deals, and all existing AFLW players must be re-signed prior to the 2019 season.

== Salary ==
AFLW players salaries are managed and paid in full by the AFL on behalf of the clubs. For the 2019 season, the league and the AFLPA agreed to the AFLW's first collective bargaining agreement (CBA). The four-tiered system salary provided for two players per team in tier one, six in each of tier two and tier three, and the remaining players in tier four:

AFLW salary tiers
Tier	Salary	Players
1	$24,600	2
2	$19,000	6
3	$16,200	6
4	$13,400	16

== Expansion club signing period ==
From 11 May expansion clubs Geelong and North Melbourne were given a ten-day window to sign existing players from 2018 AFLW lists. These clubs could sign a maximum of four players between them from any existing club. No compensation was offered to those clubs losing players under this process, but the each player's existing club could make a counter-offer to the player. A number of deals were agreed to in principle and acknowledged by clubs prior to the opening of this window.

Table of expansion club signings
Date	Player	Former club	New club	Ref
11 May	Richelle Cranston	Melbourne	Geelong	
11 May	Melissa Hickey	Melbourne	Geelong	
11 May	Erin Hoare	Melbourne	Geelong	
11 May	Anna Teague	Melbourne	Geelong	
11 May	Jenna Bruton	Western Bulldogs	North Melbourne	
11 May	Jess Duffin	Collingwood	North Melbourne	
11 May	Jasmine Garner	Collingwood	North Melbourne	
11 May	Kate Gillespie-Jones	Carlton	North Melbourne	
11 May	Emma Kearney	Western Bulldogs	North Melbourne	
11 May	Danielle Hardiman	Carlton	North Melbourne	
11 May	Tahlia Randall	Brisbane	North Melbourne	
11 May	Madison Smith	—N/a	North Melbourne	
11 May	Jamie Stanton	Brisbane	North Melbourne	
12 May	Daria Bannister	Western Bulldogs	North Melbourne	
14 May	Brittany Gibson	Brisbane	North Melbourne	
16 May	Cassie Blakeway	—N/a	Geelong	
16 May	Kate Darby	—N/a	Geelong	
16 May	Renee Garing	—N/a	Geelong	
16 May	Rebecca Goring	—N/a	Geelong	
16 May	Jordan Ivey	—N/a	Geelong	
16 May	Danielle Orr	—N/a	Geelong	
16 May	Elisha King	—N/a	North Melbourne	
16 May	Georgia Nanscawen	—N/a	North Melbourne	
16 May	Ashleigh Riddell	—N/a	North Melbourne	
18 May	Aasta O'Connor	Western Bulldogs	Geelong	
21 May	Maddie Boyd	Greater Western Sydney	Geelong	
21 May	Phoebe McWilliams	Greater Western Sydney	Geelong	
21 May	Kaitlyn Ashmore	Brisbane	North Melbourne	
21 May	Moana Hope	Collingwood	North Melbourne	
21 May	Emma King	Collingwood	North Melbourne	

== Signing and trading period ==
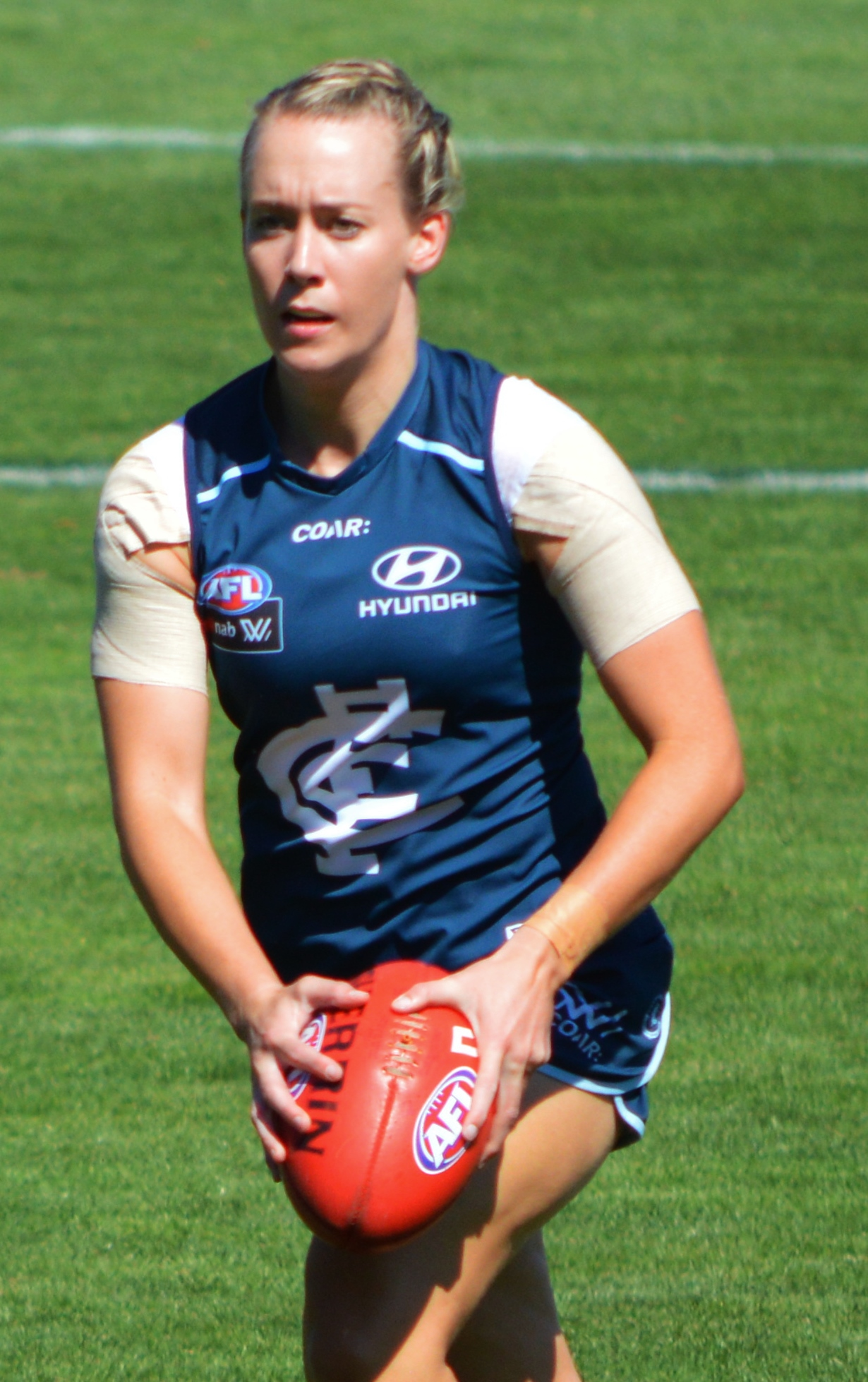
Lauren Arnell, captain of Carlton from 2017 to 2018, was traded to Brisbane.

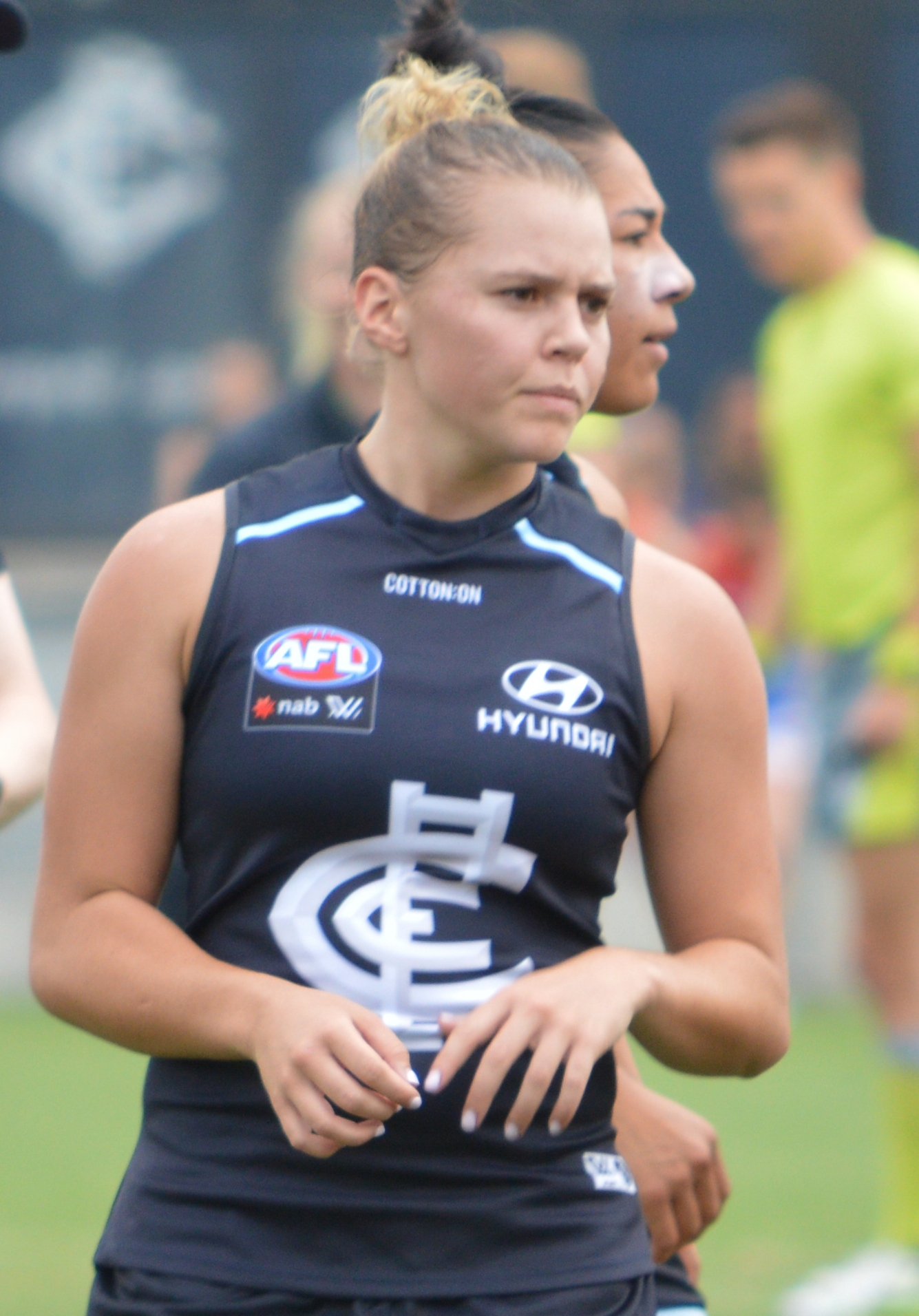
Maddi Gay was traded to Melbourne from Carlton.

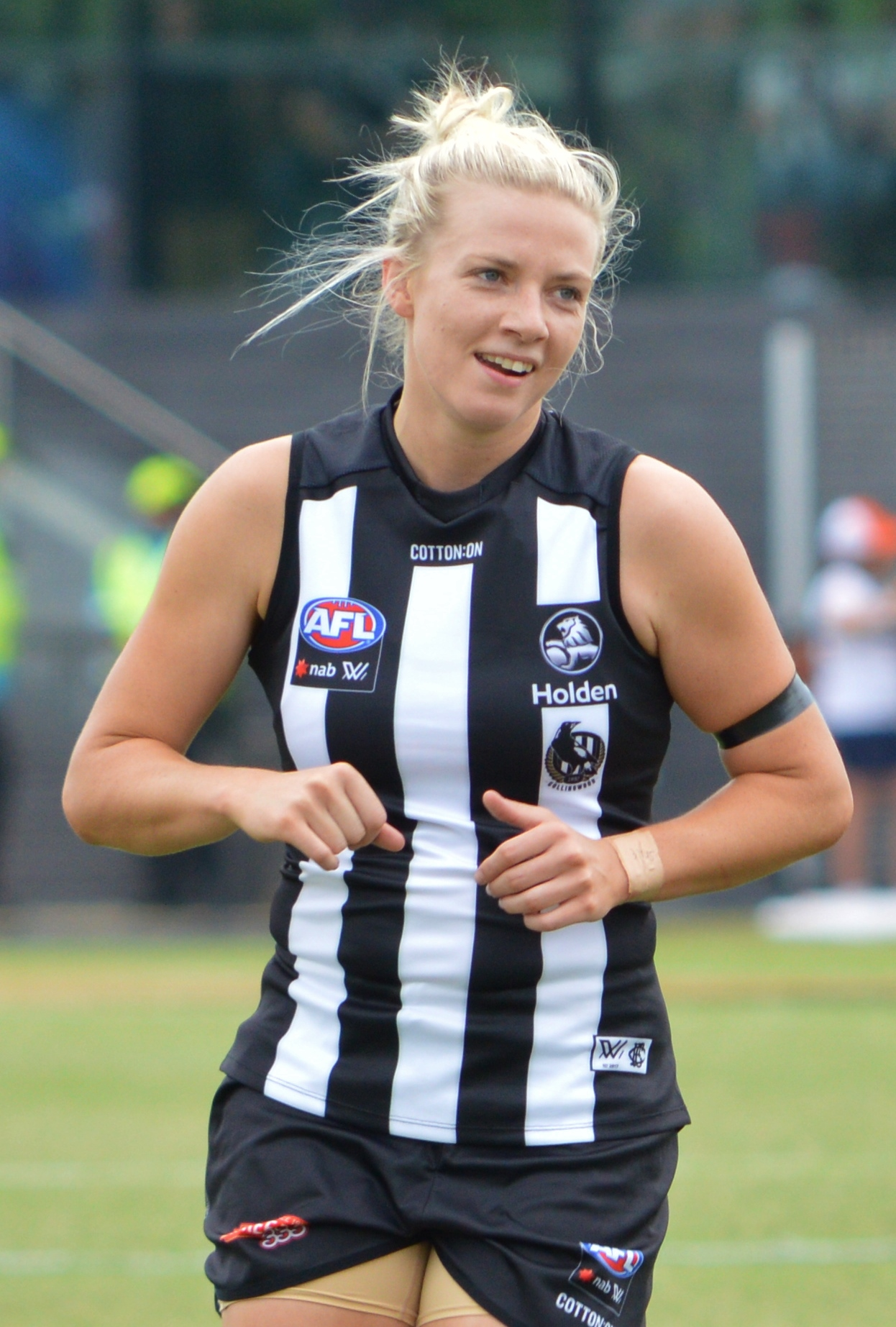
Collingwood's leading goalkicker in 2018, Christina Bernardi, was traded to Greater Western Sydney.

Beginning 23 May, clubs were given a 13-day window to re-sign players on their lists from the previous season During this time clubs were also permitted to arrange player and pick trades with other clubs.

Players who do not receive offers from their 2017 club will be free to sign with any club during the four-day free agency period starting 4 June or to nominate for the 2018 draft.

=== Trades ===
Table of trades
Clubs involved	Trade		Ref
Brisbane Carlton Collingwood	to Brisbane (from Collingwood): pick #40	to Collingwood (from Brisbane): Nicole Hildebrand	
Brisbane Carlton Collingwood	to Brisbane (from Carlton): Lauren Arnell	to Carlton (from Brisbane): pick #40	
Melbourne North Melbourne	to Melbourne (from North Melbourne): pick #12; pick #47	to North Melbourne (from Melbourne): Jasmine Grierson; Emma Humphries; pick #54	
Adelaide Greater Western Sydney	to Adelaide (from Greater Western Sydney): Renee Forth; pick #31	to Greater Western Sydney (from Adelaide): pick #19	
Carlton Collingwood Melbourne	to Carlton (from Melbourne): pick #21; pick #32	to Melbourne (from Carlton): Maddi Gay	
Carlton Collingwood Melbourne	to Carlton (from Collingwood): Amelia Barden	to Collingwood (from Carlton): pick #32	
Adelaide Collingwood Geelong Greater Western Sydney Melbourne	to Geelong (from Greater Western Sydney): pick #7; pick #20	to Greater Western Sydney (from Geelong): pick #11; pick #15	
Adelaide Collingwood Geelong Greater Western Sydney Melbourne	to Collingwood (from Greater Western Sydney): pick #11; pick #19	to Greater Western Sydney (from Collingwood): Christina Bernardi	
Adelaide Collingwood Geelong Greater Western Sydney Melbourne	to Adelaide (from Melbourne): pick #8; pick #37; pick #47	to Melbourne (from Adelaide): Talia Radan; pick #6; pick #31; pick #52	
Adelaide Collingwood Geelong Greater Western Sydney Melbourne	to Greater Western Sydney (from Melbourne): pick #12	to Melbourne (from Greater Western Sydney): pick #15	

=== Retirements and delistings ===
Table key
R	Rookie listed player

Table of player retirements and delistings
Date	Name	Club	Status	Ref
16 March	Amy Lavell	Fremantle	Retired	
21 March	Bree White	Collingwood	Retired	
4 June	Sophie Armitstead	Adelaide	Delisted	
4 June	Georgia Bevan	Adelaide	Delisted	
4 June	Abbey Holmes	Adelaide	Delisted	
4 June	Rachael Killian	Adelaide	Delisted	
4 June	Calista Boyd	Adelaide	Delisted R	
4 June	Becchara Palmer	Adelaide	Delisted R	
4 June	Brianna Walling	Adelaide	Delisted R	
4 June	Ruby Blair	Brisbane	Delisted	
4 June	Renee Cowan	Brisbane	Delisted	
4 June	Kalinda Howarth	Brisbane	Delisted	
4 June	Jessy Keeffe	Brisbane	Delisted	
4 June	Molly Ritson	Brisbane	Delisted R	
4 June	Laura Attard	Carlton	Delisted	
4 June	Madeline Keryk	Carlton	Delisted	
4 June	Sarah Last	Carlton	Delisted	
4 June	Kate Shierlaw	Carlton	Delisted	
4 June	Tiahna Cochrane	Carlton	Delisted R	
4 June	Katie-Jayne Grieve	Carlton	Delisted R	
4 June	Caitlyn Edwards	Collingwood	Retired	
4 June	Meg Hutchins	Collingwood	Delisted	
4 June	Tara Morgan	Collingwood	Delisted	
4 June	Lauren Tesoriero	Collingwood	Delisted	
4 June	Stacey Barr	Fremantle	Delisted	
4 June	Kirby Bentley	Fremantle	Delisted	
4 June	Lara Filocamo	Fremantle	Delisted	
4 June	Tiah Haynes	Fremantle	Delisted	
4 June	Emily McGuire	Fremantle	Delisted	
4 June	Belinda Smith	Fremantle	Delisted	
4 June	Jodie White	Fremantle	Delisted	
4 June	Jade de Melo	Fremantle	Delisted R	
4 June	Beatrice Devlyn	Fremantle	Delisted R	
4 June	Lisa Webb	Fremantle	Delisted R	
4 June	Melissa Freckleton	Greater Western Sydney	Delisted	
4 June	Rebecca Privitelli	Greater Western Sydney	Delisted	
4 June	Alex Saundry	Greater Western Sydney	Delisted	
4 June	Philippa Smyth	Greater Western Sydney	Delisted	
4 June	Renee Tomkins	Greater Western Sydney	Delisted	
4 June	Haneen Zreika	Greater Western Sydney	Delisted R	
4 June	Laura Duryea	Melbourne	Delisted	
4 June	Alyssa Mifsud	Melbourne	Delisted	
4 June	Maddie Shevlin	Melbourne	Delisted R	
4 June	Jessica Anderson	Western Bulldogs	Delisted	
4 June	Laura Bailey	Western Bulldogs	Delisted	
4 June	Kimberley Ebb	Western Bulldogs	Delisted	
4 June	Rachel Ashley	Western Bulldogs	Delisted	

=== Free agency ===
A four-day free agency period was held from 4 June for clubs to secure non-signed players from other clubs.

Table of free agency period signings
Date	Player	Free agent type	Former club	New club	Ref
7 June	Sophie Abbatangelo	Unlisted	—N/a	North Melbourne	
7 June	Ruby Blair	Delisted	Brisbane	Brisbane	
7 June	Jessy Keeffe	Delisted	Brisbane	Brisbane	
7 June	Belinda Smith	Delisted	Fremantle	Western Bulldogs	

A second free agency period is expected to be opened at the conclusion of the draft, allowing un-drafted players to be signed.

=== Rookie signings ===
In the absence of a rookie draft, each club was required to sign two rookie players during a rookie signing period between 11 June and 28 September 2018; these rookie players must not have played Australian rules football within the previous three years or been involved in an AFLW high-performance program.

Table of rookie signings
Club	Player	Other/former sport	Ref
Adelaide	Ailish Considine	Gaelic football	
Adelaide	Maisie Nankivell	Netball	
Brisbane	Bri McFarlane	Association football	
Brisbane	Krystal Scott	Tennis	
Carlton	Chloe Dalton	Rugby sevens	
Carlton	Brooke Walker	Rugby sevens	
Collingwood	Sharni Layton	Netball	
Collingwood	Sarah Rowe	Association football/Gaelic football	
Fremantle	Brianna Moyes	Basketball	
Fremantle	Angelique Stannett	Association football	
Geelong	Maddy McMahon	Basketball	
Geelong	Georgie Rankin	Basketball	
Greater Western Sydney	Yvonne Bonner	Gaelic football	
Greater Western Sydney	Taylah Davies	Netball	
Melbourne	Chantel Emonson	Cricket	
Melbourne	Shae Sloane	Volleyball	
North Melbourne (Note: North Melbourne also originally signed Tayla Roberts as a rookie, however Roberts made the decision to pursue her basketball career instead.)	Jessie Williams	Association football	
Western Bulldogs	Tessa Boyd	Basketball	
Western Bulldogs	Celine Moody	—N/a	

=== Inactive players ===
Following final list lodgements, a number of players experienced changing circumstances that made them unable to participate in the 2019 season. Clubs were granted permission to place these players on an inactive list, retaining rights to their services at a assigned cost in the 2019 draft while replacing them for the one season. In some cases, compensation was awarded in pre-draft listing at the cost of a discounted draft selection. Players on each club's inactive list ahead of the 2018 draft are listed below:

Table of inactive players
Club	Player	Reason	Ref
Adelaide	Jessica Allan	Work	
Adelaide	Ruth Wallace	Personal	
Brisbane	Sophie Conway	Injury (ACL)	
Collingwood	Melissa Kuys	Injury (achilles)	
Collingwood	Chloe Molloy	Injury (foot)	
Fremantle	Brianna Green	Injury (knee)	
Greater Western Sydney	Britt Tully	Personal	
Melbourne	Daisy Pearce	Pregnancy	

== Draft ==
A draft was held at Melbourne's Marvel Stadium on 23 October 2018. As in previous drafts, players nominated a single state's draft pool, and players are eligible to be drafted only by clubs operating in their nominated state. In addition, Victorian players could nominate for one of three Victorian zones: Geelong, Melbourne metro, or the entire state. An order for the draft was announced on 22 May that allocated Geelong and North Melbourne picks at the end of each of each round, and a number of compensation picks to Geelong and clubs that lost players to reflect the relative weakness of their recruiting period and their loss of talent respectively.

Table key
^	Player selected under father–daughter rule
^{+}	Recruiting compensation pick
^{†}	Inactive player compensation pick
^{‡}	Inactive player compensation pre-listing
^{#}	Compensation pick
—	The field is not applicable for this selection
Pass	The relevant club did not utilise their pick in the draft
←	Selection was traded from another club; e.g. ←Greater Western Sydney ←Geelong (selection originally held by Geelong, which traded it to Greater Western Sydney, which on-traded it to the club that used selection)

Table of draft selections
Rd.	Pick	Player	Club	Recruited from		Notes
Rd.	Pick	Player	Club	Club	League	Notes
1	1^{+}	Nina Morrison	Geelong	Geelong Falcons	TAC Cup	
1	2^{+}	Sophie Van De Heuvel	Geelong	GWV Rebels	TAC Cup	
1	3	Maddy Prespakis	Carlton	Calder Cannons	TAC Cup	
1	4	Jasmin Stewart	Fremantle	Claremont	WAWFL	
1	5	Jordyn Allen	Collingwood	Dandenong Stingrays	TAC Cup	
1	6 ii	Tyla Hanks	Melbourne	Gippsland Power	TAC Cup	←Adelaide
1	7	Rebecca Webster	Geelong	Murray Bushrangers	TAC Cup	←Greater Western Sydney
1	8	Nikki Gore	Adelaide	South Adelaide	SANFLW	←Melbourne
1	9	Paige Parker	Brisbane	Coorparoo	QAFLW	
1	10	Eleanor Brown	Western Bulldogs	Sandringham Dragons	TAC Cup	
1	11	Katie Lynch	Collingwood	Oakleigh Chargers	TAC Cup	←Greater Western Sydney ←Geelong
1	12	Alyce Parker	Greater Western Sydney	Thurgoona Bulldogs	TDFL	←Melbourne ←North Melbourne
2	13^{+}	Mikala Cann	Collingwood	Eastern Ranges	TAC Cup	
2	14^{+}	Olivia Purcell	Geelong	Geelong Falcons	TAC Cup	
2	15^{+}	Maddy Brancatisano	Melbourne	Northern Knights	TAC Cup	←Greater Western Sydney ←Geelong
2	16	Abbie McKay^	Carlton	Sandringham Dragons	TAC Cup	Daughter of Andrew McKay
2	17	Sabreena Duffy	Fremantle	Peel Thunderbirds	WAWFL	
2	18	Lauren Butler	Collingwood	GWV Rebels	TAC Cup	
2	19	Maddie Shevlin	Collingwood	Gungahlin Jets	AFL Canberra	←Greater Western Sydney ←Adelaide
2	20	Denby Taylor	Geelong	Geelong Falcons	TAC Cup	←Greater Western Sydney
2	21	Jayde van Dyk	Carlton	Eastern Ranges	TAC Cup	←Melbourne
2	22	Nat Grider	Brisbane	University of Queensland	QAFLW	
2	23	Aisling McCarthy	Western Bulldogs	Tipperary GAA	LGAA	
2	24	Georgia Clarke	Geelong	GWV Rebels	TAC Cup	
2	25	Daisy Bateman	North Melbourne	Oakleigh Chargers	TAC Cup	
3	26^{+}	Kate Bartlett	Western Bulldogs	Peel Thunderbirds	WAWFL	
3	27	Charlotte Wilson	Carlton	Eastern Ranges	TAC Cup	
3	28	Philipa Seth	Fremantle	East Fremantle	WAWFL	
3	29	Sophie Alexander^{‡}	Collingwood	Collingwood	VFL Women's	
3	30	Jess Foley	Adelaide	Sturt	SANFLW	
3	31	Jordann Hickey	Melbourne	NT Thunder	VFL Women's	←Adelaide ←Greater Western Sydney
3	32	Georgia Gourlay	Collingwood	Casey Demons	VFL Women's	←Melbourne
3	33	McKenzie Dowrick	Brisbane	Subiaco	WAWFL	
3	34	Selena Karlson	Western Bulldogs	Southern Saints	VFL Women's	
3	35	Rene Caris	Geelong	GWV Rebels	TAC Cup	
3	36	Courteney Munn	North Melbourne	Southern Saints	VFL Women's	
4	37^{+}	Chloe Scheer	Adelaide	Central District	SANFLW	←Melbourne
4	38	Emerson Woods	Carlton	Eastern Ranges	TAC Cup	
4	39	Courtney Stubbs	Fremantle	Subiaco	WAWFL	
4	40	Rhiannon Watt	Carlton	Southern Saints	VFL Women's	←Brisbane ←Collingwood
4	41	Katelyn Rosenzweig	Adelaide	North Adelaide	SANFLW	
4	42^{#}	Jessica Edwards	Carlton	Collingwood	VFL Women's	Sophie Li compensation pick
4	43	Brittany Perry	Greater Western Sydney	North Adelaide	SANFLW	
4	44	Shelley Heath	Melbourne	Southern Saints	VFL Women's	
4	45	Lauren Bella	Brisbane	Bond University	QAFLW	
4	46	Jessie Davies	Western Bulldogs	Western Bulldogs	VFL Women's	
4	47	Maighan Fogas	Geelong	Geelong	VFL Women's	
4	48	Danielle Ponter	Adelaide	Essendon	VFL Women's	←Melbourne ←North Melbourne
5	49	Pass	Carlton	—	—	
5	50	Parris Laurie	Fremantle	Claremont	WAWFL	
5	51	Jordan Membrey	Collingwood	Wilston Grange	QAFLW	
5	52	Pass	Melbourne	—	—	←Adelaide
5	53^{†}	Hannah Martin	Adelaide	West Adelaide	SANFLW	
5	54	Lisa Whiteley	Greater Western Sydney	South Adelaide	SANFLW	
5	55	Chloe Haines	North Melbourne	Burnie	TSL Women's	←Melbourne
5	56	Tori Groves-Little	Brisbane	Coorparoo	QAFLW	
5	57	Elisha Coventry	Geelong	Geelong	VFL Women's	
5	58	Libby Haines	North Melbourne	Burnie	TSL Women's	
6	59	Laura Pugh	Fremantle	West Perth	WAWFL	
6	60	Ingrid Nielsen	Greater Western Sydney	UNSW-Eastern Suburbs	Sydney Women's AFL	
6	61	Jesse Wardlaw	Brisbane	Coorparoo	QAFLW	
6	62	Madeline Keryk	Geelong	Geelong	VFL Women's	
6	63	Nicole Bresnehan	North Melbourne	Clarence	TSL Women's	
7	64	Matilda Sergeant	Fremantle	Claremont	WAWFL	
7	65	Renee Tomkins	Greater Western Sydney	Auburn-Penrith Giants	Sydney Women's AFL	
8	66	Ebony Dowson	Fremantle	Peel Thunderbirds	WAWFL	
8	67	Delma Gisu	Greater Western Sydney	Wilston Grange	QAFLW	
9	68	Pass	Fremantle	—	—	
9	69	Haneen Zreika	Greater Western Sydney	Auburn-Penrith Giants	Sydney Women's AFL	
9	70	Erica Fowler^{‡}	Collingwood	Collingwood	VFL Women's	
9	71	Ebony O'Dea	Greater Western Sydney	Norwood	SANFLW	

=== Undrafted free agency ===
A final free agency period opened after the conclusion of the draft, allowing clubs that passed on a draft selection to recruit from outside their state-based zone.

Table of undrafted free agency period signings
Date	Player	Free agent type	Former club	New club	Ref
24 October	Kirby Bentley	Undrafted	Fremantle	Carlton	
24 October	Jade Ellenger	Compensation (rookie)	Coorparoo (QAFLW)	Brisbane	
24 October	Ashleigh Woodland	Undrafted	North Adelaide (SANFLW)	Melbourne	
24 October	Jacqui Yorston	Compensation (rookie)	Wilston Grange (QAFLW)	Brisbane	
25 October	Katie-Jayne Grieve	Undrafted	Peel Thunderbirds (WAWFL)	Fremantle	
25 October	Beth Lynch	Compensation (rookie)	Richmond (VFLW)	North Melbourne	

== See also ==
- 2018 AFL draft
