= Tweed Coast Football Club =

Tweed Coast

Names
- Full name: Tweed Coast Football Club
- Nickname: Tigers

Club details
- Founded: 2009; 17 years ago
- Colours
- Competition: QFA Division 2 South
- President: Andrew Ryan
- Coach: Dean Solomon
- Captain: Glen Phelps Conor McDowell
- Ground: Seabreeze Sports Field & Barry Sheppard Oval

Uniforms
Home

Other information
- Official website: tweedcoasttigers.com

Tweed Coast Football Club, nicknamed Tigers, is an Australian rules football club based on the Tweed Coast in northern New South Wales. The team currently competes in the Queensland Football Association Division 2 South.

Formed in 2009 the Tigers played in the Summerland AFL until it was merged into the Queensland State League in 2011. The Club experienced success early in its 2nd year under Coach Shane Shallue. Shallue Coached the club to Premierships in 2010, 2012, 2013 and 2015 before stepping aside in at the end of 2016.

In 2017, under the guidance of Coach Katie Pattison, the Club added a women's team to the playing group. The inaugural team, Co-Captained by Eleanor Crawley and Rachel Kelly, finished 3rd in 2017 and followed up with Grand Final appearances in 2018 and 2019 under Coach Shane Art..

== Premierships (4) ==
| No. | Year | Competition | Opponent | Score | Venue |
|---|---|---|---|---|---|
| 1 | 2010 | Summerland AFL | Lismore Swans | 11.6 (82) - 8.6 (54) | Fripp Oval |
| 2 | 2012 | SEQAFL Div 4 South | Bond University Bullsharks | 17.12 (114) - 9.16 (70) | Fripp Oval |
| 3 | 2013 | SEQAFL Div 4 South | Byron Bay Magpies | 9.5 (59) - 6.6 (42) | Fripp Oval |
| 4 | 2015 | QAFA (B) South | Byron Bay Magpies | 10.8 (68) - 19.7 (67) | Byron Recreational Ground |

== See also ==
- AFL NSW/ACT
- Australian rules football in New South Wales
