= Sophie Alexander (footballer) =

Australian rules footballer

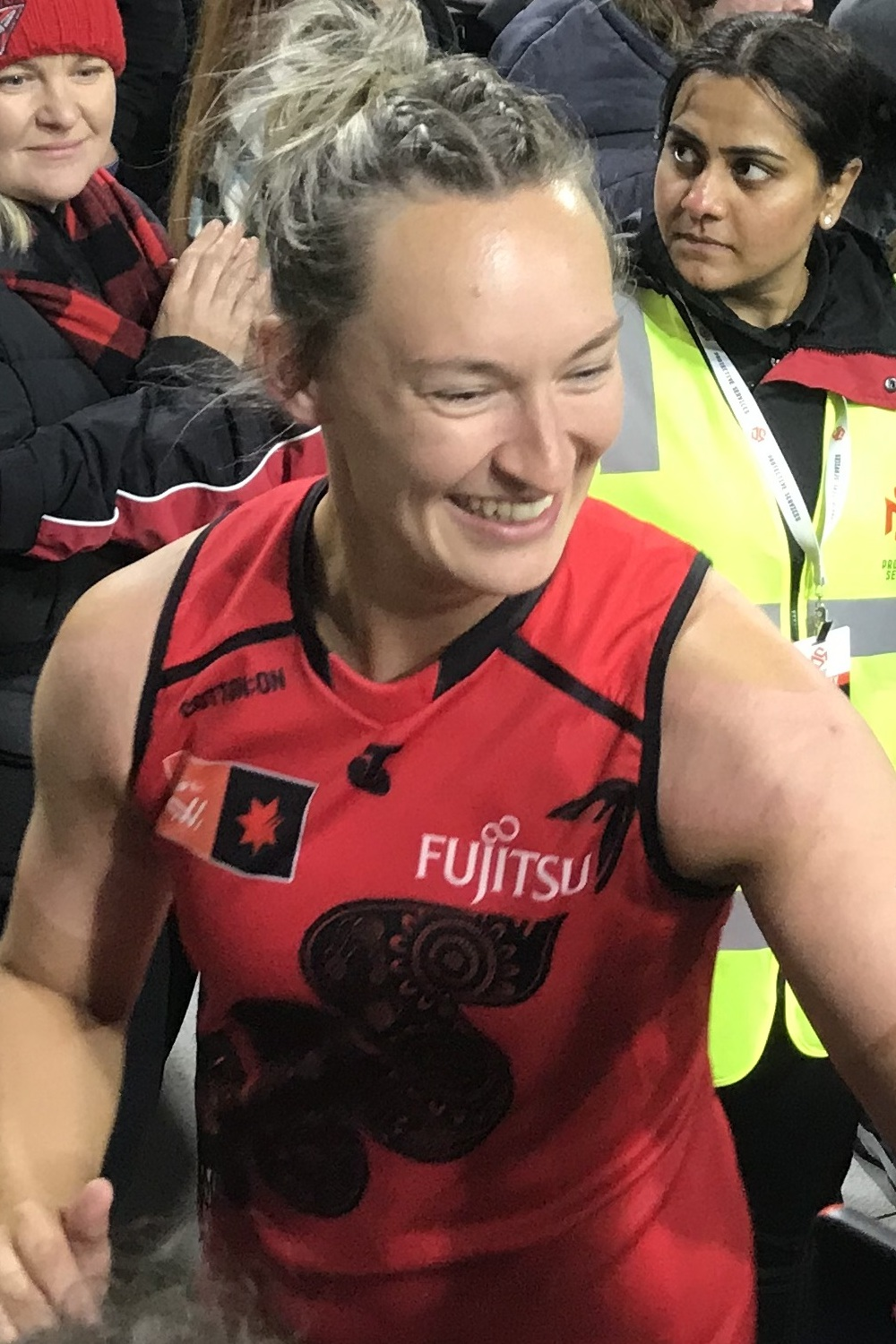
- Alexander post-match with Essendon in 2023

Personal information
- Born: 25 May 1993 (age 33)
- Original team: Redan (VWFL)
- Draft: No. 29, 2018 AFLW draft
- Debut: Round 1, 2019, Collingwood vs. Geelong, at GMHBA Stadium
- Height: 178 cm (5 ft 10 in)
- Position: Forward

Club information
- Current club: Essendon
- Number: 24

Playing career^{1}
Years	Club	Games (Goals)
2019–2022 (S6)	Collingwood	31 (16)
2022 (S7)–2026	Essendon	53 (27)
Total		84 (43)
- ^{1} Playing statistics correct to the end of the 2023 season.

Sophie Alexander (born 25 May 1993) is an Australian rules footballer playing for Essendon in the AFL Women's (AFLW). She was a South East Australian Basketball League basketballer before taking up football in the Victorian Women's Football League. Alexander spent a year in Collingwood's VFL Women's (VFLW) team before ascending to the senior list through the 2018 AFLW draft, where she played until the end of 2022 AFL Women's season 6.

== Early sporting career ==
Alexander played basketball for the Ballarat Rush in the South East Australian Basketball League. After five years with the Rush, she took up football in 2016 with Redan Football Club in the Victorian Women's Football League, playing six matches. Alexander also started playing for the Horsham Lady Hornets in the Country Basketball League. In 2017, she played 13 games with the Eastern Devils in the VFL Women's, playing in the forward line and midfield. Coach Brendan Major noted her ability to score from outside the 50-metre arc, a rarity in women's football. Alexander was invited to the 2017 AFLW draft combine but was not selected in the 2017 draft. She joined Collingwood's VFLW side in 2018 and was named in the VFLW Team of the Year on the interchange bench. Alexander was also the club's leading goalkicker.

== AFL Women's career ==
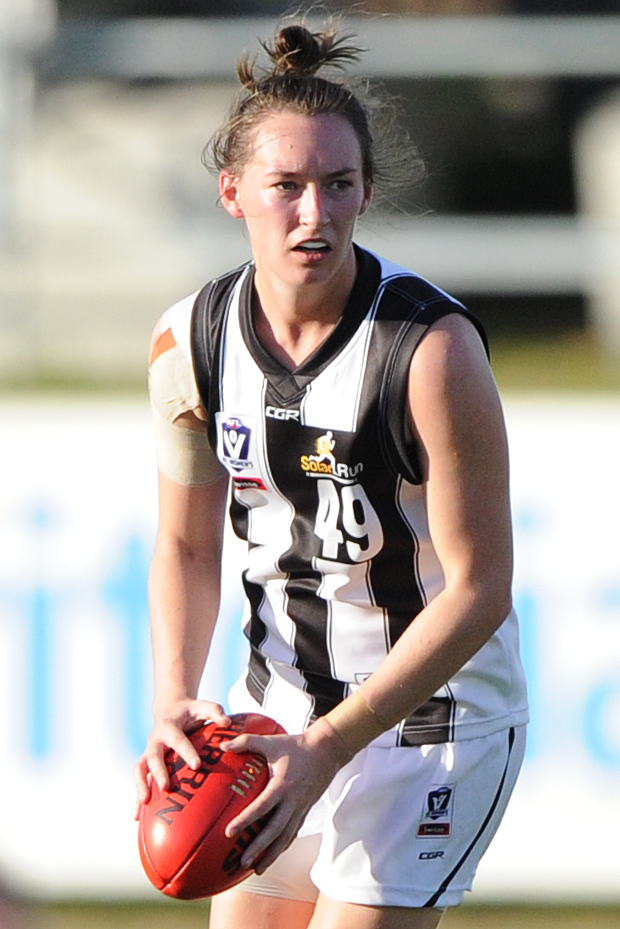
Alexander playing for Collingwood's VFLW team in 2018

=== Collingwood (2019–2022) ===
For the 2018 AFLW draft, Collingwood was granted two chances to pre-select recruits to compensate for losing players to injury and rival clubs, using a similar bidding mechanism to the father–daughter rule. Collingwood chose Alexander and Erica Fowler; an unspecified club bid on Alexander, requiring Collingwood to match the bid with its following available selection: pick 29. Alexander kicked the first goal of the 2019 AFLW season in her opening round debut; however, she was concussed in the third quarter after a marking contest.

=== Essendon (2022–present) ===
In May 2022, Alexander left Collingwood to join expansion club Essendon.

== Statistics ==
Statistics are correct as of the end of the 2022 (S6) season.

Legend
G	Goals	K	Kicks	D	Disposals	T	Tackles
B	Behinds	H	Handballs	M	Marks

Season	Team	No.	Games	Totals							Averages (per game)						
Season	Team	No.	Games	G	B	K	H	D	M	T	G	B	K	H	D	M	T
2019	Collingwood	24	4	1	2	17	5	22	7	5	0.3	0.5	4.3	1.3	5.5	1.8	1.3
2020	Collingwood	24	5	3	2	12	8	20	8	5	0.6	0.4	2.4	1.6	4.0	1.6	1.0
2021	Collingwood	24	11	6	10	40	38	78	22	11	0.5	0.9	3.6	3.5	7.1	2.0	1.0
2022 (S6)	Collingwood	24	11	6	5	37	25	62	20	10	0.5	0.5	3.4	2.3	5.6	1.8	0.9
Career			31	16	19	106	76	182	57	31	0.5	0.6	3.4	2.5	5.9	1.8	1.0

== Personal life ==
Alexander is from Ballarat, Victoria, and studied paramedicine and nursing at university.
