= Sam Naismith =

Australian rules footballer (born 1992)

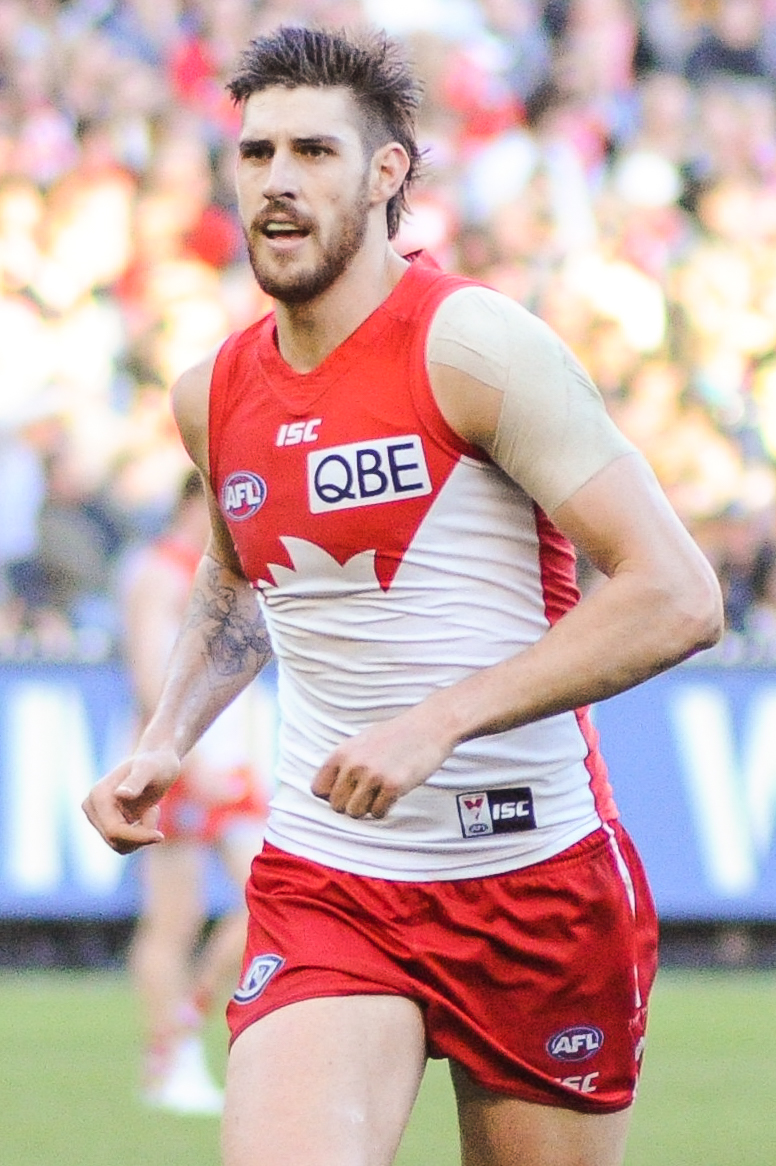
- Naismith playing for Sydney in June 2017

Personal information
- Full name: Sam Naismith
- Nickname: Cray
- Born: 16 July 1992 (age 34); Narrabri, New South Wales
- Original teams: North Shore (Sydney AFL); Gunnedah (TAFL)
- Draft: 59th pick, 2013 Rookie Draft
- Height: 206 cm (6 ft 9 in)
- Weight: 108 kg (238 lb)
- Position: Ruckman

Playing career
Years	Club	Games (Goals)
2014–2022	Sydney	30 (3)
2024	Richmond	3 (0)
Total		33 (3)

Sam Naismith (born 16 July 1992) is a former Australian rules footballer who played for Sydney and Richmond in the Australian Football League (AFL).

== Early life and junior football ==
Naismith was born in Narrabri, New South Wales but moved to Gunnedah with his family at a young age. He grew up playing rugby league and supported the Parramatta Eels in the National Rugby League. He first played Australian rules football at the age of 16 when a school friend convinced him to take part in a few training sessions with the Gunnedah Bulldogs. A year later, as a 17-year-old, he was named joint best and fairest winner of the Tamworth Australian Football League in 2009. By 2011 Naismith was ready to quit Aussie rules and move to Sydney to play rugby union until then-Sydney Swans coach Paul Roos called him and invited him to join the Swans' talent academy. Naismith accepted the invitation and began playing for the North Shore Bombers in the Sydney AFL competition in 2012. By the end of the season he was rookie drafted by the Swans.

== AFL & VFL career ==
Naismith made his debut for the Swans in the final round of 2014 season against Richmond. Naismith assumed the ruck duties alone that day as Mike Pyke and Tom Derickx, alternative ruck options, were both injured.

In December 2022, Naismith was delisted by the Swans and signed by VFL side Port Melbourne Football Club. He played for Port Melbourne during the 2023 season. In November 2023, Naismith signed with Richmond as a delisted free agent after the club traded their back-up ruckman Ivan Soldo to Port Adelaide during the trade period.

Naismith announced his retirement from football on 21 August 2024.

== Coaching career ==
On 18 October 2024, it was announced that Naismith had joined Fremantle Football Club as a ruck & development coach.

== Statistics ==
Legend
G	Goals	K	Kicks	D	Disposals	T	Tackles
B	Behinds	H	Handballs	M	Marks	H/O	Hit-outs

Season	Team	No.	Games	Totals								Averages (per game)								Votes
Season	Team	No.	Games	G	B	K	H	D	M	T	H/O	G	B	K	H	D	M	T	H/O	Votes
2014	Sydney	35	1	0	0	0	6	6	1	3	16	0.0	0.0	0.0	6.0	6.0	1.0	3.0	16.0	0
2015	Sydney	35	0	—	—	—	—	—	—	—	—	—	—	—	—	—	—	—	—	0
2016	Sydney	35	12	3	1	42	68	110	25	39	277	0.3	0.1	3.5	5.7	9.2	2.1	3.3	23.1	0
2017	Sydney	35	15	0	3	52	81	133	25	40	419	0.0	0.2	3.5	5.4	8.9	1.7	2.7	27.9	0
2018	Sydney	35	0	—	—	—	—	—	—	—	—	—	—	—	—	—	—	—	—	0
2019	Sydney	35	0	—	—	—	—	—	—	—	—	—	—	—	—	—	—	—	—	0
2020 (Note: The 2020 season was played with 17 home-and-away matches per team (down from 22) and 16-minute quarters with time on (down from 20-minute quarters with time on) due to the impact of the COVID-19 pandemic.)	Sydney	10	2	0	0	15	4	19	5	9	53	0.0	0.0	7.5	2.0	9.5	2.5	4.5	26.5	0
2021	Sydney	10	0	—	—	—	—	—	—	—	—	—	—	—	—	—	—	—	—	0
2022	Sydney	10	0	—	—	—	—	—	—	—	—	—	—	—	—	—	—	—	—	0
2024	Richmond	24	3	0	0	9	17	26	8	6	38	0.0	0.0	3.0	5.7	8.7	2.7	2.0	12.7	0
Career			33	3	4	118	176	294	64	97	803	0.1	0.1	3.6	5.3	8.9	1.9	2.9	24.3	0

== Honours and achievements ==
Team

- McClelland Trophy (Sydney): 2016
