= Shelley Heath =

Australian rules footballer

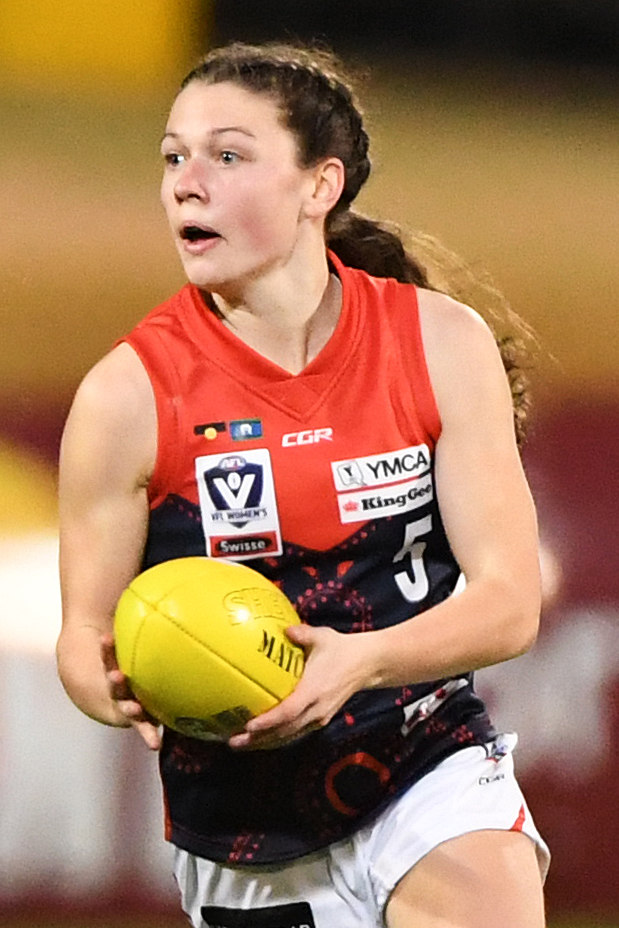
- Heath playing for Casey Demons in July 2019

Personal information
- Born: 6 June 2000 (age 26)
- Original team: Dandenong Stingrays (TAC Cup)
- Draft: No. 44, 2018 AFL Women's draft
- Debut: Round 6, 2019, Melbourne vs. Western Bulldogs, at Marvel Stadium
- Height: 160 cm (5 ft 3 in)
- Position: Utility

Club information
- Current club: Melbourne
- Number: 30

Playing career^{1}
Years	Club	Games (Goals)
2019–	Melbourne	78 (6)
- ^{1} Playing statistics correct to the end of the 2025 season.

Career highlights
- AFLW premiership player: Season 7 (2022)

Shelley Heath (born 6 June 2000) is an Australian rules footballer playing for the Melbourne Football Club in the AFL Women's competition (AFLW). Heath was drafted by Melbourne with the club's fourth selection and the 44th pick overall in the 2018 AFL Women's draft. She made her debut against the Western Bulldogs at Marvel Stadium in round 6 of the 2019 season.
