= Brianna Moyes =

Australian rules footballer and basketball player

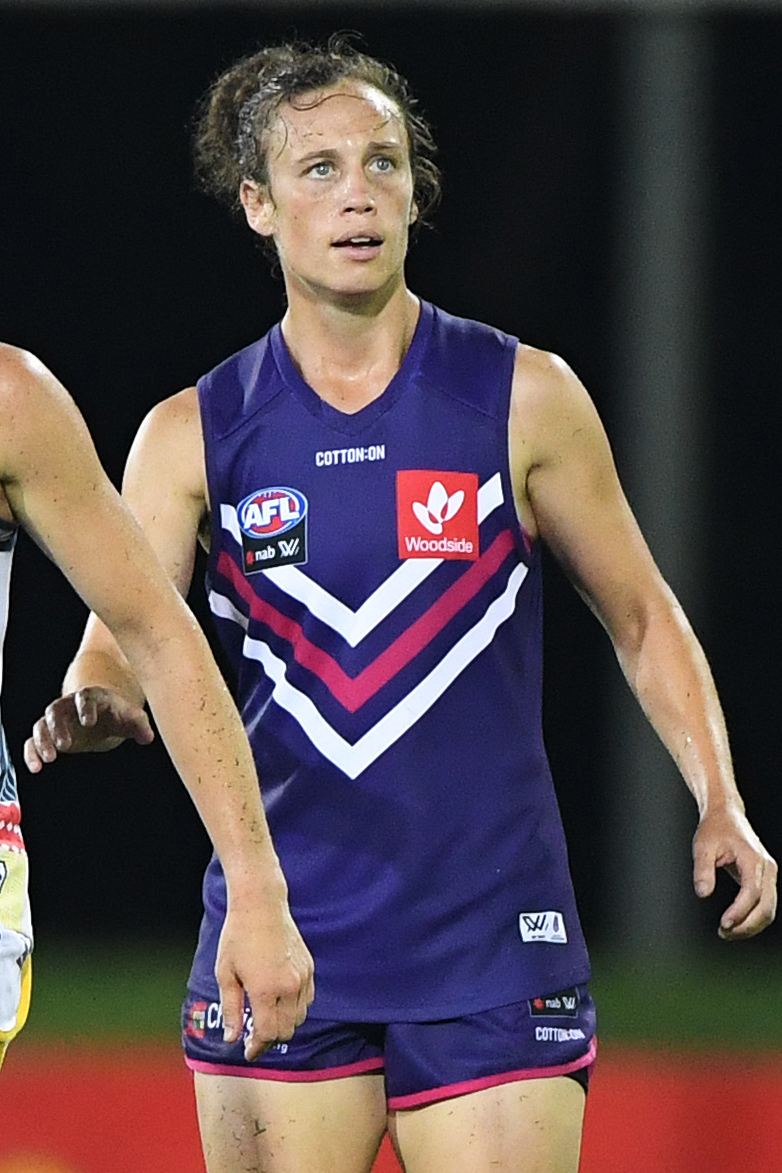
- Moyes with Fremantle in January 2019

Personal information
- Born: 17 March 1991 (age 35)
- Draft: Rookie signing, 2018
- Debut: Round 3, 2019, Fremantle vs. Collingwood, at Fremantle Oval
- Height: 166 cm (5 ft 5 in)

Playing career^{1}
Years	Club	Games (Goals)
2019	Fremantle	1 (0)
- ^{1} Playing statistics correct to the end of the 2019 season.

Brianna Moyes (born 17 March 1991) is an Australian rules footballer and basketball who played for the Fremantle Football Club in the AFL Women's (AFLW) and South Mandurah in the Peel Football League Women's competition. Originally from Sydney, she has previously played basketball for Perth Lynx, Gold Coast Rollers and two US colleges, University of Akron and Colorado Christian University.

In the first quarter of her debut match against Collingwood at Fremantle Oval in Round 3 of the 2019 AFLW season, Moyes ruptured her anterior cruciate ligament in her knee, causing her to be out for the remainder of the season.
