= New England Australian Football League =

The New England Australian Football League was an Australian rules football league based around the University of New England in Armidale, Australia. It was created by UNE students in 1962 and ran until 1984, when its remaining clubs moved to the North West AFL.

One former NEAFL club, the New England Nomads, still plays today in the Tamworth AFL. The Coffs Harbour Swans also played in the NEAFL before creating their own local competition, the North Coast AFL.

== History ==
The first match was played in 1962 between University of New England and Moree in Armidale in 1962 with the university split into two teams based on the colleges Wright and Robb. In 1963 it was named the Northern Districts Australian Football League and 3 teams competed up to 1964. When Moree withdrew, the league continued for many years as a 3 college university competition between Wright, Robb and Earle Page colleges.

Until the mid-1970s, the league was essentially an internal competition run by and for the students of the University of New England. Four teams representing the student houses at the university competed. In 1975, a club was formed in Tamworth. The following seasons saw the creation of further clubs in Gunnedah, Wee Waa and Coonabarabran. The non-Armidale based clubs soon broke away to form their own league, the North West AFL.

The league changed completely in 1975 when clubs from Armidale City team until Tamworth entered. Other new clubs including the Gunnedah Bulldogs and the Wanderers formed in the nearby town of Uralla, although they folded by the early 1980s. In 1978, Tamworth and Gunnedah left to form the North West Australian Football Association.

A club from Coffs Harbour formed for the 1979 league, and won the NEAFL premiership in 1980. They formed a second team for the 1981 season, giving Coffs two teams, Norths and Souths. A team from further down the coast, at Port Macquarie also joined the competition. These three clubs and Port form the North Coast AFL in 1982 with new clubs from Grafton, Woolgoolga and Urunga.

Having seeded two new regional league over the preceding decade, the NEAFL folded after the 1984 season, its clubs moving to the North West AFL. The NWAFL in turn disbanded in 1993, seeing Aussie Rules revert to being an intramural sport at the university until the formation of the Tamworth AFL in 1997.
