= Chloe Haines =

Australian rules footballer

Personal information
- Born: 29 February 2000 (age 26)
- Original team: Burnie Dockers (TSLW)
- Draft: No. 55, 2018 national draft
- Debut: Round 3, 2019, North Melbourne vs. Western Bulldogs, at University of Tasmania Stadium
- Height: 173 cm (5 ft 8 in)
- Position: Midfielder/forward

Club information
- Current club: North Melbourne
- Number: 29

Playing career^{1}
Years	Club	Games (Goals)
2019–2020	North Melbourne	1 (0)
- ^{1} Playing statistics correct to the end of the 2020 season.

Chloe Haines (born 29 February 2000) is an Australian rules footballer who last played for North Melbourne in the AFL Women's (AFLW).

== Early life ==
From Wynyard, Tasmania, Haines grew up playing basketball with her identical twin sister Libby. They were both introduced to football through a clinic administered by the Burnie Dockers at their school Hellyer College when they were in year 10. Both sisters were included in the 2018 AFLW Academy, which allowed them to train with AFLW clubs and attend development camps. They played for their state at the 2018 AFL Women's Under 18 Championships and later competed in the Eastern Allies team. Both sisters played in a VFL Women's match for Melbourne University – Chloe amassed 12 disposals, five marks and five tackles.

== AFLW career ==
Haines was drafted by North Melbourne with pick 55 in the 2018 national draft, together with her sister, Libby. She made her debut against the Western Bulldogs in round 3 of the 2019 season. Haines was re-signed for the 2020 season. In June 2020, Haines was delisted by North Melbourne, along with her sister, Libby.
