= Sophie Abbatangelo =

Australian rules footballer (born 1990)

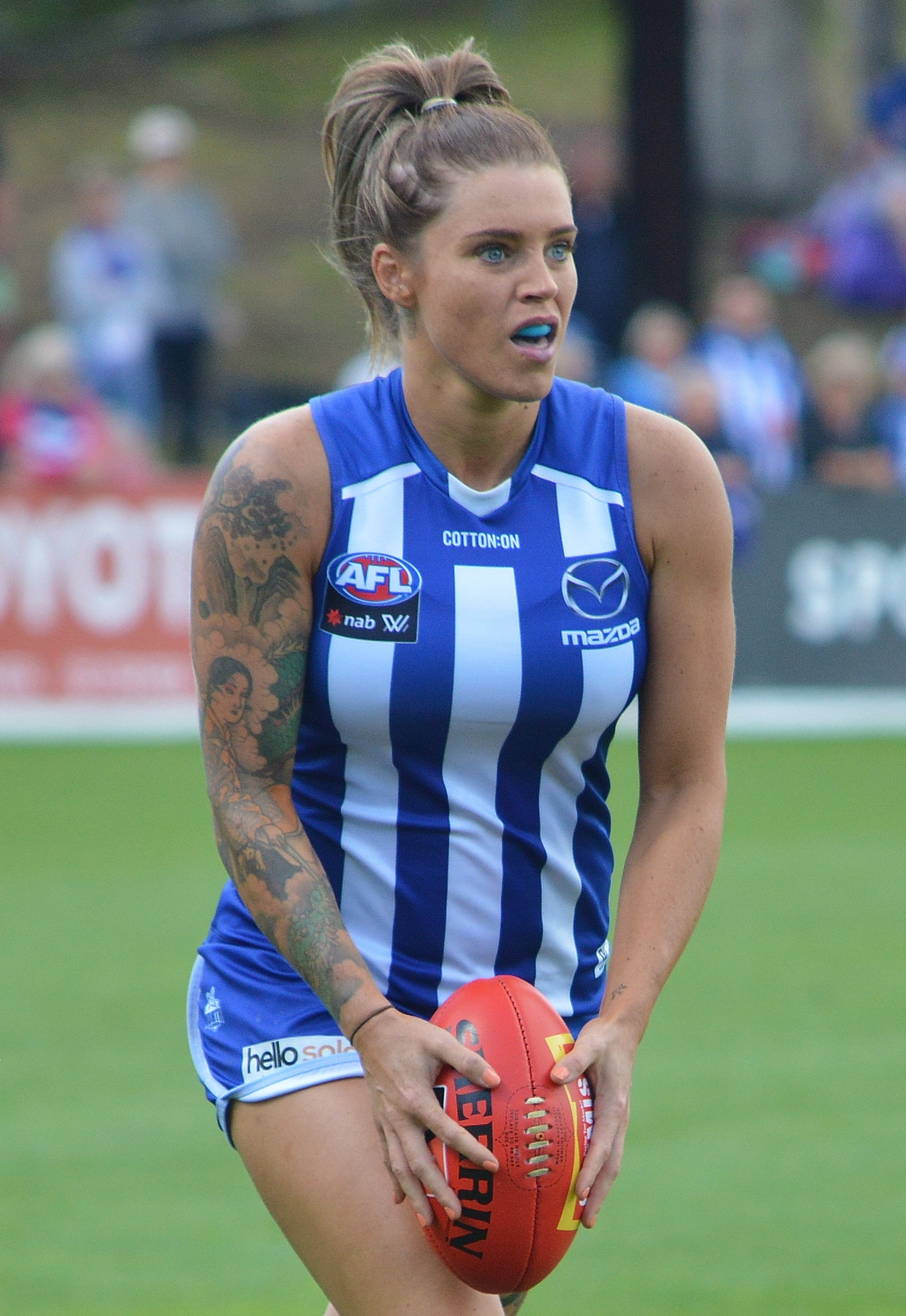
- Abbatangelo with North Melbourne in March 2021

Personal information
- Born: 27 June 1990 (age 36)
- Original team: Melbourne University (VFLW)
- Debut: Round 1, 2019, North Melbourne vs. Carlton, at North Hobart Oval
- Height: 167 cm (5 ft 6 in)
- Position: Forward

Playing career^{1}
Years	Club	Games (Goals)
2019–S7 (2022)	North Melbourne	42 (29)
- ^{1} Playing statistics correct to the end of the S7 (2022) season.

Sophie Abbatangelo (born 27 June 1990) is an Australian rules footballer who last played for the North Melbourne Football Club in the AFL Women's competition (AFLW). Abbatangelo was signed by North Melbourne as a free agent during the expansion club signing period in 2018. She made her debut in the club's inaugural match, a 36-point victory over Carlton at North Hobart Oval in the opening round of the 2019 season. It was revealed Abbatangelo was likely to explore the option of a trade in the wake of the 2021 AFL Women's season. However, she ended up honouring her contract with the club, which had her at the club until 2022. In March 2023, Abbatangelo was delisted by North Melbourne.
