= Wallis Randell =

Australian rules football player

Personal information
- Full name: Wallis Randell
- Born: 14 July 2001 (age 25)
- Original team: Bond University (QAFLW)
- Draft: No. 61, 2020 AFL Women's draft
- Height: 170 cm (5 ft 7 in)
- Position: Defender

Club information
- Current club: Gold Coast
- Number: 15

Playing career^{1}
Years	Club	Games (Goals)
2021–	Gold Coast	26 (0)
- ^{1} Playing statistics correct to the end of the 2023 season.

Wallis Randell (born 14 July 2001) is an Australian rules footballer playing for the Gold Coast Suns in the AFL Women's (AFLW).

== Early life ==
Randell grew up on a cane farm in Carmila, Queensland, located 108km south of Mackay. She was a talented basketballer in her younger years and represented Queensland in national competitions before switching her attention to Australian rules football and joining the Gold Coast Suns Academy.

== AFL Women's career ==
Randell made her AFLW debut for the Gold Coast Suns in 2021.
