= North West Australian Football League =

The North West Australian Football League was an Australian rules football league in north-western New South Wales, featuring teams from towns such as Tamworth, Narrabri, Moree, Gunnedah, Wee Waa, Inverell and Coonabarabran.

The league disbanded after the 1993 season, although Australian rules football was restarted in the area in the late 90s in the form of the Tamworth Australian Football League.

== History ==
The North West AFL was formed as the North West Australian Football Association in 1978 by clubs from the New England Australian Football League - Tamworth, Moree and Gunnedah. In 1985, the New England AFL, based around the University of New England in Armidale, folded. The remaining NEAFL clubs joined the North West Association.

Due to declines in the local economy, coupled with the large distances between clubs, the league folded in 1993. The resumption of a 12-a-side league in Tamworth, the forerunner of today's Tamworth Australian Football League, saw Australian rules restart in the region two years later in 1995.
