= Krystal Scott =

Australian rules football player

Personal information
- Full name: Krystal Scott
- Born: 17 October 1994 (age 32)
- Original team: Bond University (QAFLW)
- Height: 170 cm (5 ft 7 in)
- Position: Midfielder

Playing career
Years	Club	Games (Goals)
2018–2019	Brisbane	0 (0)
2022 (S7)	Gold Coast	1 (0)
Total		1 (0)

Krystal Scott (born 17 October 1994) is a former Australian rules footballer who played for the Gold Coast Suns in the AFL Women's (AFLW). She was also listed for two years with Brisbane, but didn't make an appearance.

== Early life ==
Scott was born in Adelaide and moved to the Gold Coast at seven years of age where she began pursuing a career in tennis as a teenager. She attended King's Christian College throughout her upbringing and relocated to Virginia in the United States in 2014 when she accepted a tennis scholarship to attend Norfolk State University. Following her two seasons with NSU, she returned to the Gold Coast and was inspired to try Australian rules football for the first time at 22 years of age after seeing the success of the inaugural AFLW season. She signed up to play for Bond University in the QWFA Division 1 and helped lead Bond to the first women's premiership in club history, which would lead to her and teammate Molly Ritson being rookie drafted by the Brisbane Lions at the 2017 AFLW draft.

== AFL Women's career ==
=== Brisbane ===
Scott spent two years on Brisbane's list before being delisted in 2019 without making her AFLW debut.

=== Gold Coast ===
Scott was drafted by her hometown team, the Gold Coast Suns, as a mature-age signing in the 2022 AFLW draft. She made her AFLW debut in round 10 of 2022 AFL Women's season 7. In December 2022, Scott announced her retirement from football after making a single appearance.

== Statistics ==
Legend
G	Goals	K	Kicks	D	Disposals	T	Tackles
B	Behinds	H	Handballs	M	Marks

Season	Team	No.	Games	Totals							Averages (per game)							Votes
Season	Team	No.	Games	G	B	K	H	D	M	T	G	B	K	H	D	M	T	Votes
2018	Brisbane	31	0	—	—	—	—	—	—	—	—	—	—	—	—	—	—	0
2019	Brisbane	31	0	—	—	—	—	—	—	—	—	—	—	—	—	—	—	0
2022 (S7)	Gold Coast	21	1	0	0	1	2	3	0	2	0.0	0.0	1.0	2.0	3.0	0.0	2.0	0
Career			1	0	0	1	2	3	0	2	0.0	0.0	1.0	2.0	3.0	0.0	2.0	0
