= Bond University Football Club =

Names
- Full name: Bond University Australian Football Club
- Nickname: Bull Sharks

Club details
- Founded: 2011; 15 years ago
- Colours: Blue and Gold
- Competition: QFA Div 2: Senior men QAFLW: Senior women
- Ground: Bond University (capacity: 500)

Uniforms
Home

The Bond University Football Club, nicknamed the Bull Sharks, is an Australian rules football club based on the Gold Coast in Queensland, operating out of Bond University. The club currently competes in the Queensland Football Association and the QAFL Women's competitions.

The club is currently one of two universities that supply teams to AFL Queensland, the other being University of Queensland.

== History ==
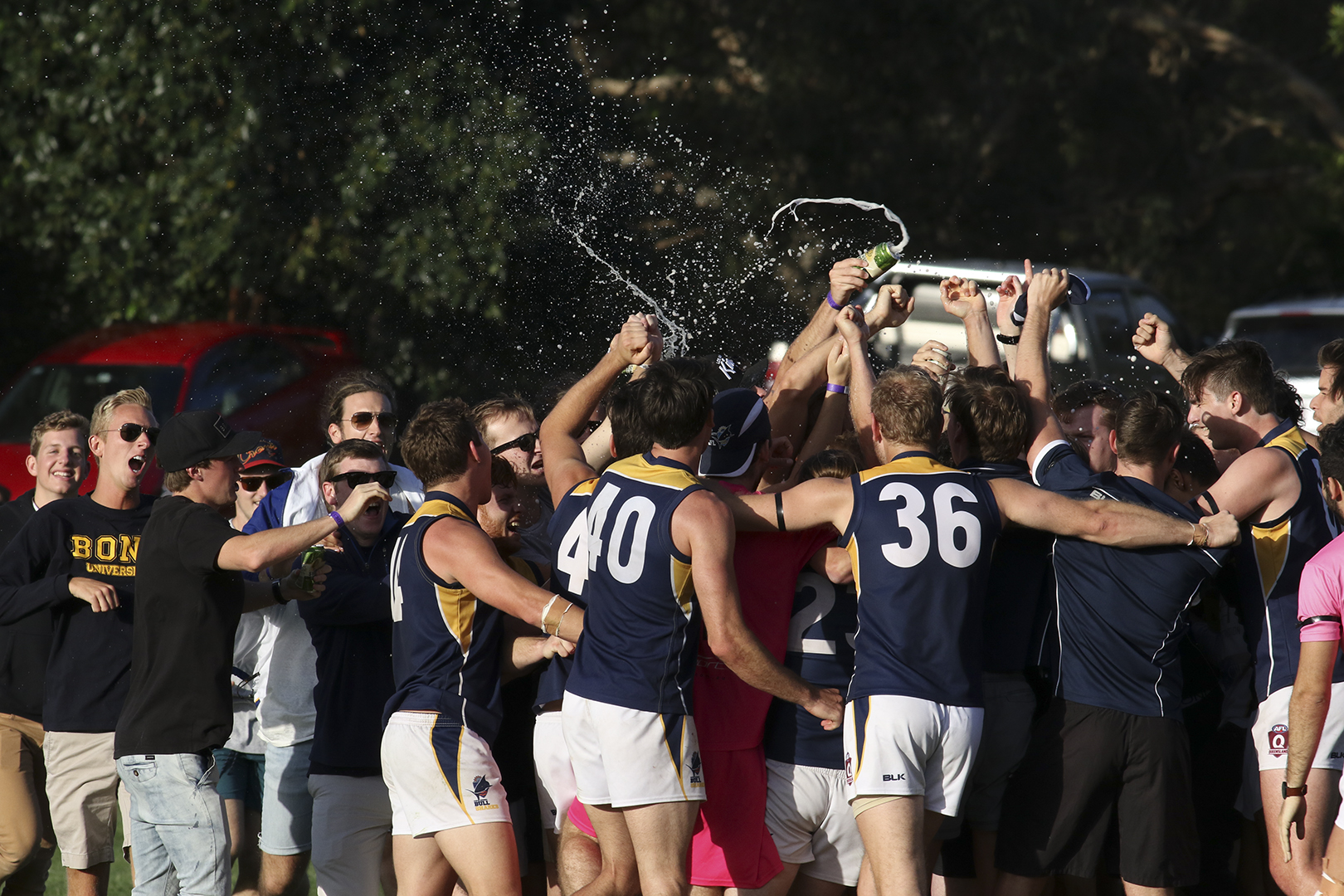
Players celebrate after winning the 2015 QAFA (A) Grand Final

The Bond University Football Club was formed in 2011 and entered the AFLQ Division 3 Central league for their inaugural season. Bond would play home games at the Robina Roos' ground on Scottsdale Drive due to unsuitable facilities existing at the university. Nicknamed the Bull Sharks, the club surprised many by compiling a 14–1 record through the home and away season to claim the minor premiership. Bond would suffer a 31-point loss to Jimboomba in the 2011 Grand Final. The club was then transferred to the newly created SEQAFL Division 4 South league which was a combination of former Summerland Australian Football League teams mixed with Gold Coast clubs.

Bond would again reach the Grand Final in 2012 but lightning would strike twice as the Bull Sharks fell to Tweed Coast by 44 points. After a disappointing 2013 season in which the club was eliminated in the first round of the finals, the Bull Sharks moved their home games to the newly created Australian rules football field at the university campus. Affectionately known as the "Canal", the new grounds would prove a successful move for Bond as the club claimed a second minor premiership in 2014. The club went on to win the 2014 QAFA (B) South premiership, defeating Tweed Coast to claim the first premiership in the club's short history.

As a result of their 2014 successes, the Bullsharks were promoted to the QAFA (A) division and impressively claimed another minor premiership in 2015, going undefeated in the home and away season. The club went on to win the 2015 QAFA (A) Grand Final against the South East Suns and in doing so made it back-to-back premierships in separate divisions. This success saw them promoted again to the QFA South competition for season 2016. 2015 also saw the launch of the women's team competing in the QWAFA competition. They compiled a 9–6 record in their inaugural season and made it to the preliminary final where they were defeated by the eventual premiers Zillmere.

In September 2017, the Bond University women's team defeated Yeronga 50–29 in the Grand Final to claim the QWFA Division 1 premiership. 2017 also saw Molly Ritson and Krystal Scott drafted to the Brisbane Lions Women's team as rookies in the 2017 AFLW Draft as well as the team promoted to the QWAFL. The Men however, would suffer a rough season after sustaining mass injuries. Leading to only one win for the Seniors and subsequent relegation to QFA Division 2 for 2018.

== Premierships (6) ==
No.	Year	Competition	Opponent	Score	Venue
1	2014	QAFA (B) South	Tweed Coast Tigers	15.8 (98) – 7.16 (58)	Scottsdale Drive Oval
2	2015	QAFA (A)	South East Suns	12.21 (93) – 9.8 (62)	Tidbold Park
3	2017	QWFA Division 1	Yeronga South Brisbane	8.2 (50) – 4.5 (29)	Leyshon Park
4	2019	QAFLW Development	Coorparoo	3.8 (26) – 3.3 (21)	Leyshon Park
5	2019	QFA Division 2	Beenleigh	13.12 (90) – 7.10 (52)	Leyshon Park
6	2023	QAFLW	Aspley	10.6 (66) – 2.5 (17)	Brighton Homes Arena
7	2023	QFA Division 2 South Reserves	Coolangatta	7.5 (47) – 5.10 (40)	Fankhauser Reserve

== Drafted players in the AFLW ==
Year	Name	Team	Draft No.
2017	Molly Ritson	Brisbane	14th (rookie)
2017	Krystal Scott	Brisbane	18th (rookie)
2018	Lauren Bella	Brisbane	45th
2019	Charlotte Hammans	Gold Coast	Pre-list signing
2019	Kalinda Howarth	Gold Coast	Pre-list signing
2019	Taylor Smith	Gold Coast	Pre-list signing
2019	Molly Ritson	Gold Coast	Pre-list signing
2019	Serene Watson	Gold Coast	18th
2020	Annise Bradfield	Gold Coast	7th
2020	Maddison Levi	Gold Coast	50th
2020	Lucy Single	Gold Coast	57th
2020	Wallis Randell	Gold Coast	61st
2021	Teagan Levi	Gold Coast	6th
2021	Giselle Davies	Gold Coast	30th
2021	Mikayla Pauga	Brisbane	46th
2021	Lulu Pullar	Brisbane	58th
2021	Shannon Danckert	Gold Coast	Injury replacement
2022	Ruby Sargent-Wilson	Sydney	Pre-list signing
2022	Laquoiya Cockatoo-Motlap	Port Adelaide	Pre-list signing
2022	Litonya Cockatoo-Motlap	Port Adelaide	Pre-list signing
2022	Krystal Scott	Gold Coast	Pre-list signing
2022	Jasmyn Smith	Gold Coast	52nd
2022	Imogen Evans	Collingwood	Free agent signing
2023 sup.	Meara Girvan	Gold Coast	10th
2023	Lily Tarlinton	Adelaide	34th
2023	Kiara Bischer	Gold Coast	50th
2023	Sienna McMullen	Gold Coast	51st
2023	Imogen Evans	Collingwood	Injury replacement
