= AFL North Coast =

Australian rules football competition

- Current season, competition or edition: 2024
- Sport: Australian rules football
- Founded: 1982; 44 years ago
- No. of teams: 7 (5 in seniors)
- Country: Australia
- Most recent champion: Coffs Harbour (2025)
- Website: aflnorthcoast.com.au

The AFL North Coast is a park Australian rules football competition in the Mid North Coast region of New South Wales. Founded in 1982 as The North Coast Australian Football League it merged with the junior league in its area in 2008 and was renamed AFL North Coast.

== History ==
Australian rules was first played at Lismore in June 1903 between two local teams and initially proved popular.

=== The very beginning ===
A meeting to form an Australian Football club in Coffs Harbour was held in the Coffs Hotel on 6 December 1976. The meeting to form the Coffs Harbour club was attended by 12 enthusiastic people – all of whom were elected to the committee. Fred Miller, who had led the charge to establish the code in the district, was elected as president. The first secretary-treasurer was Brian Saville. The club did not have enough players for a team, nor a coach, nor a ground to play on yet they commenced training at 5pm on Tuesdays in December at the St Augustine's school oval such was their enthusiasm for the game. The new club chose to adopt the colours of North Melbourne Football Club, at that time enjoying great success in the then VFL, while the Dehnert brothers, Noel and Phil volunteered to provide timber saplings for the goal posts.

=== Early Days ===
The first-ever Australian football match played in Coffs Harbour was in 1977 between a University of New England team and Coffs Harbour 12 March at the Coffs Harbour Racecourse – the university side won the match 13.12 (80) to 4.13 (37). The Coffs Coast Advocate reported that the match attracted about 50 spectators and "despite the heavy conditions was enjoyed by everyone there". Some club scratch matches were played that year but the match at Coffs Harbour racecourse was the only official match played in Coffs in 1977. A North Coast team made of players from Coffs Harbour and Port Macquarie played in the Northern NSW Country Championships at Gunnedah in May 1977 but lost both matches to New England and a North-West team. It was decided at these championships to play the 1978 series at Coffs Harbour to promote the game on the North Coast.

=== Playing in New England ===
The Coffs Harbour club joined the New England AFL for the 1978 season. The competition had four teams based around the New England university and Uralla who had also entered the New England competition that year. There were two major challenges for the Coffs Harbour club now that it had a competition to play in. The first hurdle to overcome was to secure a ground to train and play on. The second issue was to travel for away games across to Armidale almost 180 kilometres away via Dorrigo Mountain with a large unsealed section of road at Ebor. The club was very fortunate to have Mike Cain as a committee member as he was working at the time as a town planner with the Coffs Harbour Shire Council. It was largely through his efforts that the club secured England's Park as a home ground. Coffs Harbour enjoyed almost immediate success in this league finishing third in its initial season in the New England league then taking out the premiership in 1979.

=== Two teams in Coffs Harbour ===
Even in its infancy the Coffs club administrators knew that the future for Australian Rules on the Coffs Coast was on the coast. Therefore, it entered two teams in the New England AFL in 1980 – Souths and Norths, but under the one administration with a view to eventually forming a North Coast league. Brian Saville said in the Coffs Coast Advocate on 5 October 1979: "Having a strong side for a long time will not benefit the sport in this area". He added that the aim of the Coffs Harbour club was to have its own North Coast League. As the original Coffs club had worn blue and white vertical stripes the same as VFL club North Melbourne (Kangaroos) it was agreed to call one team "Norths" and the other "Souths" based on the-then VFL club South Melbourne (now the Sydney Swans) and have it wear white with a red V. The first ever local derby between the North Coffs and South Coffs was played in 1980 on 18 May "in fine spirit before a large, enthusiastic crowd at England's Park". The final score saw North Coffs 10.5 (65) defeat South Coffs 9.10 (64). North Coffs defeated Armidale City 13.8 (86) to 4.5 (29) for the 1980 New England AFL premiership after the Armidale team defeated South Coffs in the preliminary final. The next year North Coffs and South Coffs met in the 1981 grand final which South Coffs won.

=== 1982 – North Coast league begins ===
The New England AFL had provided a competition for the Coffs Harbour teams but it was time to move on and develop a coastal league. With the formation of the North Coast AFL in 1982 the two Coffs Harbour teams became clubs in their own right. The other clubs to form the North Coast Australian Football League were Grafton, Urunga, Woolgoolga and Port Macquarie. The Port club had been formed in 1981 and played its first season in the New England AFL. The inaugural president was Brian Saville, who had been instrumental in the establishment of the game in Coffs Harbour. Woolgoolga won the first of its nine premierships in the North Coast AFL when it beat Port Macquarie in the first-ever grand final.

In 1985 Port Macquarie left to form a new league to the south of the town. They formed the Mid North AFL with Forster (from the Newcastle FL) and 3 new teams that had formed in Taree, Kempsey and Walchope. This league lasted until 1992 before folding. Port Macquarie, Taree and Kempsey then joined the NCAFL.

Meanwhile, Woolgoolga was the team to beat, early trendsetters they managed to play in the first thirteen grand finals for the league winning seven of them.

Grafton decided in 1996 to play in the Summerland AFL and wouldn't return for 6 seasons.

=== The 2000s, merger and renaming of league ===
Taree folded in 2002, the same year that Grafton returned to the competition.

After nine premierships the Woolgoolga Club ran out of steam and went into recess after the 2005 season.

Up until 2008 the North Coast Junior and Senior Competitions had operated as separate legal entities. In late 2008 the two competitions merged to form AFL North Coast. In 2014 AFL North Coast further merged with the Mid North Coast Juniors that had comprised clubs from Port Macquarie, Camden Haven, Macleay Valley, and Wauchope. For the first time AFL on the North Coast was serviced by one entity covering both Seniors and Juniors, stretching from Taree to Yamba.

The two Coffs Harbour base clubs merged and formed the Coffs Harbour Breakers in 2015.

In 2017 the Board of AFL North Coast determined to name the Senior Best and Fairest award the Brian Saville Medal in recognition of the enormous contribution Brian had made to the early years of the code in the region. Luke Matthews won his second Best and Fairest award to be the first recipient of the Brain Saville Medal.

That same year AFL North Coast made its first foray into female footy with the introduction of a four team Youth Girls (Under 17) competition. Earlier that year former Sawtell/Toormina local junior Nikki Wallace had become the first North Coast player to be play at AFL level, and the Youth Girls Best and Fairest award was named the Nikki Wallace Medal. Cassidy Ronalds was the first winner of the medal.

In 2018 an open age Women's competition commenced with teams from the Port Macquarie Magpies, Sawtell/Toormina Saints, and Coffs Breakers competing. Also in 2018 the Under 18 age group changed to become Under 17 to better align with the junior pathway.

2019 and 2020 saw a period of significant local growth, with the Northern Beaches Blues club forming in Woolgoolga in 2019, followed by the Nambucca Valley Lions in 2020. In each case the club fielded a Reserve Grade team in its first season and went on to win the competition at the first attempt. Northern Beaches Blues had a joint venture Women's team with the Grafton Tigers in 2019 which then became a stand alone Northern Beaches team the following season.

Further expansion was achieved in 2021, with Lismore Swans moving south from the former AFL Northern Rivers League, together with the Casino Lions that reformed after many years in recess. These latest additions, together with both Northern Beaches Blues and Nambucca Valley Lions stepping up to the Senior Grade saw the competition operate with eight Senior men's teams and six Women's teams. Unfortunately, the state-wide lockdown enacted by the state government on 14 August meant that the season had to be abandoned after the first week of Finals, with the Minor Premiers acknowledged in each grade.

The damage to the town of Lismore caused by the floods in early 2022, has caused hardship for the football club to play in 2022. The club was forced to take the position that football was not the priority for the townsfolk so they withdrew all teams for the season.

At the end of 2022 the Byron Magpies voted to join the league.

== Clubs ==
=== Current clubs ===
Locations of the NCAFL clubs. Red clubs field open age sides, yellow clubs only field juniors

Club	Colours	Nickname	Home ground	Senior teams			Former League	Est.	Years in NCAFL	NCAFL Senior Premierships	
Club	Colours	Nickname	Home ground	Men	Res.	Women	Former League	Est.	Years in NCAFL	Total	Years
Senior Level
Coffs Harbour		Breakers	Fitzroy Oval, Coffs Harbour	Yes	Yes	Yes	–	2014	2015-	3	2017, 2019, 2025
Northern Beaches (Woolgoolga 1982-2005)		Blues	Wiigulga Sports Complex,Woolgoolga	Yes	Yes	Yes	–	1982	1982-2005, 2019-	9	1982, 1983, 1985, 1987, 1988, 1992, 1993, 1996, 1998
Port Macquarie		Magpies	Wayne Richards Park, Port Macquarie	Yes	Yes	Yes	NEAFL, MNAFL	1981	1982-1984, 1993-	5	2000, 2007, 2013, 2022, 2024
Sawtell–Toormina		Saints	Richardson Park, Sawtell	Yes	Yes	Yes	–	1987	1987, 1991-2001, 2003-	10	1997, 2005, 2006, 2008, 2009, 2010, 2014, 2015, 2016, 2018
Reserve Level
Grafton		Tigers	Ellem Oval, Grafton	No	Yes	No	SAFL	1982	1982-1995, 2002-	3	2011, 2012, 2020

=== Junior clubs ===
Club	Colours	Nickname	Home Ground	Est.	Years in NCAFL
Bellingen		Bulldogs	Burdett Park, Fernmount		?-present
Lower Clarence		Suns	Raymond Laurie Sports Centre, Yamba	2023	2023-
Nambucca Valley (Urunga 1982-85)		Lions	E.J. Biffin Playing Fields, Nambucca Heads	1982	1986-1989, 2005-2011, 2020-
North Coffs		Kangaroos	Bruce Barnier Oval, Coffs Harbour	1982	1982-
South West Rocks		Dockers	South West Rocks Sporting Fields, South West Rocks	2018	2018-

All senior clubs also field junior sides.

=== Former clubs ===
Club	Colours	Nickname	Home Ground	Former League	Est.	Years in NCAFL	NCAFL Senior Premierships		Fate
Club	Colours	Nickname	Home Ground	Former League	Est.	Years in NCAFL	Total	Years	Fate
Byron		Magpies	Cavanbah Centre, Byron Bay	QFA	1984	2023	1	2023	Merged with Ballina to form Southern Stingrays in Queensland FA following 2023 season. Re-formed in Northern Rivers Cup in 2025
Camden Haven		Bombers	Laurieton Oval, Laurieton	–	2013	2013-2014	0	-	Folded after 2014 season
Casino		Lions	Queen Elizabeth Park, Casino	SAFL	2003	2017, 2021-2022	0	-	Entered recess after 2017 and 2022 seasons. Re-formed in Northern Rivers Cup in 2025
Lismore		Swans	Gloria Mortimer Oval, Lismore	QFA	2002	2021-2022	0	-	Folded after 2022 season. Re-formed in Northern Rivers Cup in 2025
Macleay Valley		Eagles	South Kempsey Oval, Kempsey	MNAFL	1985	1993, 2015-2016, 2025	0	–	Entered recess after 1993 and 2016 seasons. Folded during 2025 season.
Manning Valley		Mustangs	Johnny Martin Oval, Taree	–		?-2023	0	-	Juniors only. Folded after 2023 season
North Coffs		Kangaroos	Bruce Barnier Oval, Coffs Harbour	–	1982	1982-2014	6	1990, 1994, 2001, 2002, 2003, 2004	Merged with South Coffs to form Coffs Harbour following 2014 season
South Coffs		Swans	Fitzroy Oval, Coffs Harbour	NEAFL	1976	1982-1991, 1993-2014	6	1984, 1986, 1989, 1991, 1995, 1999	Merged with North Coffs to form Coffs Harbour following 2014 season
Taree		Hornets	Taree	MNAFL	1985	1998-2002	0	-	Folded after 2002 season

== Premierships ==
Club	1st Grade	Reserve Grade	Under 18/17 (from 2018)	Women
Sawtell-Toormina Saints	10	6	5	2
Woolgoolga	9	3	2	0
Coffs Swans	6	9	8	0
North Coffs Kangaroos	6	0	5	0
Port Macquarie Magpies	5	10	3	1
Grafton Tigers	3	0	1	0
Coffs Breakers	3	1	4	3
Nambucca Valley Lions	0	1	2	0
Northern Beaches Blues	0	1	0	1
Camden Haven Bombers	0	1	1	0
Casino Lions	0	1	0	0
Taree Hornets	0	0	1	0
Lismore Swans	0	0	0	0
Byron Magpies	1	0	0	0

== List of AFL North Coast Senior grand finals ==
Year	Premiers	Runners up
1982	Woolgoolga 14.16 (100)	Port Macquarie 6.17 (53)
1983	Woolgoolga 18.18 (126)	South Coffs 6.10 (46)
1984	South Coffs 14.14 (98)	Woolgoolga 13.4 (82)
1985	Woolgoolga 11.8 (74)	North Coffs 7.7 (49)
1986	South Coffs 12.12 (84)	Woolgoolga 11.12 (78)
1987	Woolgoolga 18.8 (116)	South Coffs 10.18 (78)
1988	Woolgoolga 16.15 (111)	South Coffs 16.9 (105)
1989	South Coffs 13.8 (86)	Woolgoolga 8.6 (54)
1990	North Coffs 13.10 (88)	Woolgoolga 6.13 (49)
1991	South Coffs 12.10 (82)	Woolgoolga 10.10 (70)
1992	Woolgoolga 10.16 (76)	Sawtell-Toormina 8.9 (57)
1993	Woolgoolga 15.2 (92)	Sawtell-Toormina 7.9 (51)
1994	North Coffs 12.17 (89)	Woolgoolga 7.8 (50)
1995	South Coffs 14.12 (96)	Port Macquarie 9.5 (59)
1996	Woolgoolga 14.9 (93)	Port Macquarie 8.6 (54)
1997	Sawtell-Toormina 11.11 (77)	Woolgoolga 10.7 (67)
1998	Woolgoolga 15.11 (101)	Sawtell-Toormina 4.9 (33)
1999	Coffs Swans 11.14 (80)	North Coffs 11.6 (72)
2000	Port Macquarie 18.4 (112)	North Coffs 9.6 (60)
2001	North Coffs 13.11 (89)	Coffs Swans 9.10 (64)
2002	North Coffs 11.10 (76)	Port Macquarie 7.6 (48)
2003	North Coffs 12.11 (83)	Port Macquarie 10.9 (69)
2004	North Coffs 4.6 (30)	Port Macquarie 3.5 (23)
2005	Sawtell-Toormina 7.11 (53)	North Coffs 6.4 (40)
2006	Sawtell-Toormina 11.14 (80)	Coffs Swans 11.2 (68)
2007	Port Macquarie 11.11 (77)	Sawtell-Toormina 10.9 (69)
2008	Sawtell-Toormina 22.14 (146)	North Coffs 7.6 (48)
2009	Sawtell-Toormina 18.14 (122)	North Coffs 8.4 (52)
2010	Sawtell-Toormina 19.16 (130)	Port Macquarie 5.9 (39)
2011	Grafton 10.10 (70)	Port Macquarie 8.7 (55)
2012	Grafton 16.8 (104)	Sawtell-Toormina 7.14 (56)
2013	Port Macquarie 13.14 (92)	Sawtell-Toormina 11.6 (72)
2014	Sawtell/Toormina 14.7 (91)	Coffs Swans 8.10 (58)
2015	Sawtell/Toormina 10.16 (76)	Port Macquarie 9.13 (67)
2016	Sawtell/Toormina 9.9 (63)	Coffs Breakers 6.10 (46)
2017	Coffs Breakers 15.10 (100)	Sawtell/Toormina 8.11 (59)
2018	Sawtell/Toormina 12.11 (83)	Coffs Breakers 9.6 (60)
2019	Coffs Breakers 16.8 (104)	Port Macquarie 11.10 (66)
2020	Grafton 8.10 (58)	Sawtell/Toormina 2.8 (20)
2021	Not contested	COVID restrictions
2022	Port Macquarie 4.7 (31)	Coffs Breakers 4.4 (28)
2023	Byron Bay 14.12 (96)	Port Macquarie 5.9 (39)
2024	Port Macquarie 8.10 (58)	Coffs Breakers 6.11 (47)
2025	Coffs Breakers 10.6 (66)	Sawtell/Toormina 9.8 (62)

The grand finals of 1982–1986 were played at Englands Park, Coffs Harbour.

The grand finals of 1987–1988 were played at Centennial Oval, Woolgoolga.

The grand finals of 1989–1993 were played at Fitzroy Oval, Coffs Harbour.

Every grand final since 1994 has been played at the Coffs Harbour International Stadium, Coffs Harbour.

In the uncompleted 2021 season, Coffs Harbour Breakers were acknowledged as winners of the Minor Premiership.

== List of AFL North Coast Women's grand finals ==
Year	Premiers	Runners up
2018	Sawtell/Toormina 6.6 (42)	Port Macquarie 0.4 (4)
2019	Port Macquarie 2.9 (21)	Sawtell/Toormina 3.2 (20)
2020	Coffs Breakers 6.4 (40)	Northern Beaches 3.0 (18)
2021	Not contested	COVID restrictions
2022	Northern Beaches 5.5 (35)	Coffs Breakers 1.2 (8)
2023	Coffs Breakers 3.3 (21)	Northern Beaches 0.5 (5)
2024	Sawtell/Toormina 3.7 (25)	Coffs Breakers 2.3 (15)
2025	Coffs Breakers 5.1 (31)	Sawtell/Toormina 1.3 (9)
2026	Sawtell/Toormina 8.9 (57)	Port Macquarie 2.0 (12)

In the uncompleted 2021 season, Coffs Harbour Breakers were acknowledged as winners of the Minor Premiership.

== General statistics ==
General Information
Founded	1982
Records
Highest Score	North Coffs 51.18.324 (v Woolgoolga 2.0.12) – 2003
Most premierships	10 – Sawtell-Toormina
Most flags in a row	4 – North Coffs – 2001–2004
Most wins in a row	20 – North Coffs – 2003–2004
Most losses in a row	39 – Grafton – 2017–2019

== Woodlock Medal ==
In 2004 a medal was struck to honour the many years of service Jim and Jill Woodlock each gave to the league as administrators and Life Members. The Woodlock Medal is awarded to the player judged as the best on ground in a senior grand final. The first year the medal was awarded, North Coffs midfielder Greg Jarman edged out teammate Brad Giri for the award. Teenager Jack Gillingham became the first player to be awarded two Woodlock Medals when he won the coveted award in 2009 and 2010 when Sawtell-Toormina comfortably won the grand final. In the history of the award, only one player from a losing grand final team has been the recipient (Jai Langenberg).

Year	Woodlock medallist	Club
2004	Greg Jarman	North Coffs
2005	Alex Pearson	Sawtell-Toormina
2006	Luke Matthews	Sawtell-Toormina
2007	Dean Nankervill	Port Macquarie
2008	Mark Couzens	Sawtell-Toormina
2009	Jack Gillingham	Sawtell-Toormina
2010	Jack Gillingham	Sawtell-Toormina
2011	Evan Duryea	Grafton
2012	Lee Anderson	Grafton
2013	Jesse Schmidt	Port Macquarie
2014	Aaron Clarke	Sawtell/Toormina
2015	Danniel Johnson	Sawtell/Toormina
2016	Brandt Lee	Sawtell/Toormina
2017	Harry Parker	Coffs Breakers
2018	Hamish Bird	Sawtell/Toormina
2019	Shaydan Close	Coffs Breakers
2020	Aaron Ashby	Grafton Tigers
2021	No GF played	COVID restrictions
2022	James Read	Port Macquarie
2023	Oliver Rojo	Byron Bay
2024	Jesse Schmidt	Port Macquarie
2025	Jai Langenberg	Sawtell/Toormina

== League Best & Fairest ==
The League Best & Fairest is given for the best and fairest player in the AFL North Coast during the home and away season, similar to the AFL's Brownlow Medal. The players who have won the most League Best & Fairest awards are former Sawtell-Toormina ruckman Brian Rava in 1991, 1992 and 1998, fellow Saint Mark Couzens who claimed the prize in 2007, 2009 and 2014, Port Macquarie forward Jesse Schmidt in 2012, 2013 and 2015 and Fraser Duryea in 2016, 2021 and 2022. Jeff Reed, Troy Mirkin, Brad Giri and Luke Matthews have all won the award twice. Mirkin and Duryea are the only players to win the award at two different clubs. The list of League Best & Fairest winners follows:

Year	League Best & Fairest winner
1982	Doug Musgrave (Urunga) and Ian Johnstone (North Coffs)
1983	John Timmons (South Coffs)
1984	Steve Smith (Grafton)
1985	Anthony Cummings (Grafton)
1986	Mark O’Malley (South Coffs)
1987	Darryl Isaacs (Grafton)
1988	Not awarded
1989	Troy Mirkin (Grafton)
1990	Barry Smith (Woolgoolga)
1991	Brian Rava (Sawtell/Toormina)
1992	Brian Rava (Sawtell/Toormina)
1993	Chris Mills (Sawtell/Toormina)
1994	Jeff Reed (Coffs Swans)
1995	Jeff Reed (Coffs Swans)
1996	Darren White (Woolgoolga)
1997	Brad Payne (Port Macquarie)
1998	Brian Rava (Sawtell/Toormina)
1999	Sean Beasley (Coffs Swans)
2000	Neville Stephens (Port Macquarie)
2001	Troy Mirkin (North Coffs) and Matt Lane (Coffs Swans)
2002	Brad Giri (North Coffs)
2003	Greg Jarman (North Coffs)
2004	Mark Blundell (Grafton)
2005	Chris Martens (Port Macquarie)
2006	Matthew Newton (Port Macquarie)
2007	Brad Giri (North Coffs) and Mark Couzens (Sawtell/Toormina)
2008	Sam Dawes (North Coffs)
2009	Mark Couzens (Sawtell/Toormina)
2010	Luke Matthews (Sawtell/Toormina)
2011	Daniel Zacek (Grafton)
2012	Jesse Schmidt (Port Macquarie)
2013	Jesse Schmidt (Port Macquarie)
2014	Mark Couzens (Sawtell/Toormina)
2015	Jesse Schmidt (Port Macquarie)
2016	Fraser Duryea (Coffs Breakers)
2017	Luke Matthews (Sawtell/Toormina)
2018	Danniel Johnson (Sawtell/Toormina)
2019	Kyle Bray (Port Macquarie)
2020	Luke Stanford (Grafton)
2021	Fraser Duryea (Northern Beaches)
2022	Fraser Duryea (Northern Beaches)
2023	Blayne Hull (Byron Bay)
2024	Luke Hodoniczky (Port Macquarie)
2025	Jai Langenberg (Sawtell/Toormina) & Alex Pyke (Coffs Breakers)
2026	Jai Langenberg

== Grand Final Best on Ground – Women ==
The Women's Best on Ground in the Grand Final was introduced in the inaugural season of the competition. The list of Best on Ground winners follows:

Year	League Best & Fairest winner	Club
2018	Cambridge McCormick	Port Macquarie
2019	Cambridge McCormick	Port Macquarie
2020	Emily Conlan	Coffs Breakers
2021	No GF played	COVID restrictions
2022	Gina Cardillo	Northern Beaches
2023	Gina Cardillo	Northern Beaches
2024	Amaia Wain	Sawtell-Toormina
2026	Asha Lloyd	Sawtell-Toormina

Prior to the introduction of the Women's Competition a series of demonstration matches were played during the 2017 season. From these six matches a Players' Player Award was presented based on votes collated from each player in each match. The winner of the 2017 Players' Player Award was Maggie Mills.

== League Best & Fairest – Women ==
A Women's Best and Fairest award was introduced in 2018 to coincide with the introduction of a Women's competition. Just like the awards for their male counterparts, the award is voted on by the Umpires during the home and away season on a 3, 2, 1 basis. The list of League Best & Fairest winners follows:

Year	League Best & Fairest winner
2018	Cambridge McCormick (Port Macquarie)
2019	Cambridge McCormick (Port Macquarie)
2020	Cassidy Ronalds (Coffs Breakers)
2021	Gina Cardillo (Northern Beaches)
2022	Lilli-yana Moody (Sawtell/Toormina) & Gina Cardillo (Northern Beaches)
2023	Lilli Hutchings (Byron Magpies)
2024	Amaia Wain (Sawtell/Toormina)

== Teams of the decade ==
On the same night AFL North Coast held the 2010 league best & fairest count, it also announced a Team of the Decade for 2000–2009. To be eligible for selection a player needed to have played in at least three of the 10 years that were being judged.

Line			
B:	Brad Greenshields (NC)	Dean Nankervill (PM)	James Angel (NV)
HB:	Tony Waterfall (CS)	Mark Blundell (Gr)	Darren Funston (NC)
C:	Troy Mirkin (NC)	Mark Couzens (NC-S/T-CS)	Greg Jarman (NC)
HF:	Daniel Zacek (Gr)	Peter Chadwick (NC-CS)	Luke Matthews (NC-S/T)
F:	Jesse Schmidt (PM)	Damon Munt (PM)	Tristan Snow (W-CS)
Foll:	Nev Stephens (PM)	Matt Newton (PM)	Brad Giri (NC)
I/C	Jai Hardy (S/T)	Matt Lane (CS)	Jason Mayer (NC)
	Scott Payne (PM)	Shannon Skreja (PM)	Jon Stephens (PM)
Coach:	Russ Matthews (S/T)		
Capt:	Brad Giri (NC)		
V-Capt:	Tony Waterfall (CS)		

On Sunday 15 March 2020 AFL North Coast announced its second Team of the Decade covering the period 2010 to 2019. Selection criteria for this team was retained from the original process.

Line			
B:	Dylan Beasley (PM)	Craig Dicker (PM)	Matthew Flynn (S/T)
HB:	Rod Sonogan (PM)	Nathan Johnson (CB-S/T)	Will Darby (Gr)
C:	Chris Frangos (CB)	Luke Matthews (S/T)	Danniel Johnson (S/T)
HF:	Jesse Schmidt (PM)	Dan Zacek (Gr)	Fraser Duryea (CS-CB)
F:	Nick Stanlan-Velt (CB)	Aaron Clarke (S/T)	Evan Duryea (Gr)
Foll:	Leif Stuart (S/T)	Mark Couzens (S/T)	Luke Stanford (Gr)
I/C	Pat Curtain (CS-Gr)	Lee Anderson (Gr)	Jim Angel (S/T)
	Jacob Sincock (CB)		
Coach:	Jim Angel (S/T)		
Capt:	Luke Stanford (Gr)		
V-Capt:	Luke Matthews (S/T)		

== Female Pioneers ==
In conjunction with the announcement of the Team of the Decade (2010 to 2019) AFL North Coast also celebrated those that were the champions of the commencement of Women's footy in the region. The Female Pioneers are those players that were involved in the demonstration matches in 2017 before the competition was born, who then went on to play club footy in 2018 and/or 2019.

Alana Hanson (S/T-NB)	Allissa Tate (CB)	Anishah Burnes (PM)	Ash West (NB)
Bec Minichilli (S/T)	Bella Crawley (CB)	Bree Pinnell (CB)	Britt Hargreaves (PM-Gr-NB)
Cambridge McCormick (PM)	Casey Miosge (CB-PM)	Cassidy Ronalds (CB)	Emily Bennett (CB-NB)
Fiona Bagley (PM)	Hannah McDonald (CB)	Jenni Cooper (PM-S/T)	Jess Ronalds (CB)
Keely Owen (CB)	Kimberley Hamnett (PM)	Laura Connell (NB)	Laura Young (CB)
Lauren Beasley (PM)	Lauren French (S/T)	Maggie Mills (S/T)	Rachel Bennett (CB-NB)
Remi Banuelos (CB)	Renee Markham (S/T)	Ricky Pomroy (PM)	Sara Smith-Lester (S/T)
Sarah Crotty (CB)	Tania Slack-Smith (PM)	Tiarne Saunders (S/T)	

== Legends of Local Footy ==
In 2021, AFL North Coast celebrated its 40th season of the local League since its formation in 1982. At a function on 17 April, 38 individuals were named as "Legends of Local Footy" by their clubs for their contribution throughout the 40 years of the League's history.

Club	Legends of Local Footy
North Coffs Kangaroos	Brian Saville, Ralph Hall, Mark Kelly
South Coffs/Coffs Swans	Steve Lavis, Ken McGrath, Steve Shelley
Nambucca Valley Lions	Trent Baade, Jimmy Angel, Andy Johnston, Steve Schmidt, Greg Boatfield, Barry Toohey, Dave McCormack
Port Macquarie Magpies	Paul Wilson, John Stangherlin, Paul Sheldon, Anthony Beasley
Grafton Tigers	Warren Bagnall, James Hourigan, Gail Timmons, Kevin Dixon
Woolgoolga Blues	EJ Merrick, Ivan McDonald, John Muggridge
Coffs Harbour Breakers	Jay Guthrie, Alan Clayton, Jason Sincock, Trevor Windmill, Ben Watson, Kirsten Burow
Sawtell Toormina Saints	Bob Crutchfield, Dave Rava, Alex Pearson, Mick Britton, John Arnold
Casino Lions	David Heath
Lismore Swans	Philip Tsourlinis, Daniel Bruce

== See also ==
- AFL NSW/ACT
- Australian rules football in New South Wales
