= AFL North West NSW =

Australian rules football competition

AFL North West
- Current season, competition or edition: 2025
- Sport: Australian rules football
- Founded: 1997; 29 years ago
- No. of teams: 6
- Country: Australia
- Most recent champion: Tamworth Swans (2025)
- Website: aflnorthwestnsw.com.au

AFL North West NSW is an Australian rules football competition in the Tamworth and New England region of New South Wales, Australia. The league began as a "pub competition" in Tamworth in 1997, with four 12-a-side teams, but has since slightly grown to a local league. There are four open teams in both men's and women's competitions based in three towns. AFL North West also runs junior competitions across several age groups.

Previously known as the Tamworth Australian Football League, the name was changed for the 2017 season.

Prior to the establishment of the Tamworth AFL, there had been two other leagues in the area, the New England AFL, which folded after the 1984 season - and the North West AFL, which folded after the 1993 season.

== Clubs ==
Locations of the AFL North West NSW clubs. Yellow = juniors only

=== Current ===
==== Senior ====
Club	Colours	Nickname	Home Ground	Est	Years in NWAFL	Senior Premierships			
Club	Colours	Nickname	Home Ground	Est	Years in NWAFL	Men		Women	
Club	Colours	Nickname	Home Ground	Est	Years in NWAFL	Total	Years	Total	Years
Gunnedah & District		Bulldogs, Poochettes	Wolseley Park, Gunnedah	1977	2002–	3	2017, 2019, 2020	2	2020, 2023
Inverell		Saints	Varley Oval, Inverell	2004	2005–	5	2007, 2010, 2018, 2023, 2024	4	2019, 2022, 2024, 2025
New England		Nomads	Bellevue Oval, Armidale	1999	1999–2023, 2025-	9	2000, 2001, 2004, 2012, 2013, 2014, 2015, 2016, 2023	0	-
Tamworth (Note: Known as Nuttsy's Bulldogs 1997-1998; Cargill Kangaroos 1999-2001; and, Tamworth Kangaroos 2002-)		Kangaroos	Bicentennial Park, Tamworth	1997	1997–	4	2002, 2003, 2008, 2011	0	-
Tamworth (Note: Known as David Mitchell Swans 1997-2001)		Swans	Bicentennial Park, Tamworth	1997	2002–	5	1997, 1999 2006, 2009, 2025	0	-

==== Junior ====
Club	Colours	Nickname	Home Ground	Founded
Glen Innes		Celts	King George V Oval, Glen Innes	2019
Tamworth		Roosters	Bicentennial Park, Tamworth	

=== Former ===
Club	Colours	Nickname	Home Ground	Est.	Years in competition	Senior Premierships		Fate
Club	Colours	Nickname	Home Ground	Est.	Years in competition	Total	Years	Fate
Armidale Wanderers		Wanderers	Bellevue Oval, Armidale	2000	2000-2001	0	-	Folded after 2001 season
Courthouse		Eagles	Bicentennial Park, Tamworth	1997	1997-1999	0	-	Folded after 1999 season
Muswellbrook		Cats	Weeraman Fields, Muswellbrook	1983	2003-2013	1	2005	Moved to Black Diamond AFL following 2013 season
Moree		Suns	Moree Showgrounds, Moree	2015	2015-2022	0	-	Merged with Narrabri for 2022 season, folded before 2023 season
Narrabri		Eagles	Leitch Oval, Narrabri	2004	2004-11; 2014-2018, 2022	0	-	Merged with Moree for 2022 season, folded before 2023 season
Prime Magpies		Magpies	Bicentennial Park, Tamworth	1997	1997-2000	1	1998	Folded after 2000 season

== Premiers ==
Year	Premiers	Runners-up
1997	David Mitchell Swans	Courthouse Eagles
1998	Prime Magpies	David Mitchell Swans
1999	David Mitchell Swans	New England Nomads
2000	New England Nomads	Prime Magpies
2001	New England Nomads	David Mitchell Swans
2002	Tamworth Kangaroos	Tamworth Swans
2003	Tamworth Kangaroos	New England Nomads
2004	New England Nomads	Tamworth Kangaroos
2005	Muswellbrook	Tamworth Swans
2006	Tamworth Swans	New England Nomads
2007	Inverell	Tamworth Kangaroos
2008	Tamworth Kangaroos	Inverell
2009	Tamworth Swans	Inverell
2010	Inverell	Tamworth Kangaroos
2011	Tamworth Kangaroos	Inverell
2012	New England Nomads	Inverell
2013	New England Nomads	Inverell
2014*	New England Nomads*	Inverell
2015	New England Nomads	Tamworth Kangaroos
2016	New England Nomads	Tamworth Kangaroos
2017	Gunnedah & District	New England Nomads
2018	Inverell	Gunnedah & District
2019	Gunnedah & District	New England Nomads
2020	Gunnedah & District	Tamworth Swans
2021	No finals due to COVID-19 pandemic	
2022	New England Nomads	Tamworth Swans
2023	Inverell	Tamworth Swans
2024	Inverell	Tamworth Swans
2025	Tamworth Swans	Inverell

- *(match abandoned at end 3rd quarter)

== 2010 Ladder ==
Tamworth AFL	Wins	Byes	Losses	Draws	For	Against	%	Pts	Final	Team	G	B	Pts	Team	G	B	Pts
Inverell Saints	11	3	3	1	0	0	#DIV/0!	58	1st Semi	New England Nomads	16	14	110	Tamworth Swans	12	14	86
Tamworth Kangaroos	10	3	3	2	0	0	#DIV/0!	56	2nd Semi	Inverell Saints	16	9	105	Tamworth Kangaroos	14	9	93
New England Nomads	10	3	5	0	0	0	#DIV/0!	52	Preliminary	Tamworth Kangaroos	7	16	58	New England Nomads	6	10	46
Tamworth Swans	7	3	6	2	0	0	#DIV/0!	44	Grand	Inverell Saints	12	16	88	Tamworth Kangaroos	10	6	66
Gunnedah & District	6	2	8	2	0	0	#DIV/0!	36									
Narrabri Eagles	5	2	10	1	0	0	#DIV/0!	30									
Muswellbrook Cats	0	2	14	2	0	0	#DIV/0!	12									

== 2011 Ladder ==
Tamworth AFL	Wins	Byes	Losses	Draws	For	Against	%	Pts	Final	Team	G	B	Pts	Team	G	B	Pts
Tamworth Kangaroos	11	0	1	0	1442	883	163.31%	44	1st Semi	Inverell Saints	16	14	110	Narrabri Eagles	10	10	70
New England Nomads	8	0	4	0	1258	957	131.45%	32	2nd Semi	Tamworth Kangaroos	18	20	128	New England Nomads	11	4	70
Inverell Saints	8	0	4	0	1332	1135	117.36%	32	Preliminary	Inverell Saints	11	14	80	New England Nomads	7	10	52
Narrabri Eagles	5	0	7	0	1156	1233	93.76%	20	Grand	Tamworth Kangaroos	17	16	118	Inverell Saints	11	14	80
Gunnedah & District	5	0	7	0	1021	1095	93.24%	20									
Muswellbrook Cats	3	0	9	0	915	1426	64.17%	12									
Tamworth Swans	2	0	10	0	925	1320	70.08%	8									

== 2012 Ladder ==
Tamworth AFL	Wins	Byes	Losses	Draws	For	Against	%	Pts	Final	Team	G	B	Pts	Team	G	B	Pts
New England Nomads	13	0	2	0	1590	861	184.67%	52	1st Semi	Tamworth Kangaroos	19	15	129	Gunnedah & District	12	4	76
Inverell Saints	11	0	4	0	2038	1079	188.88%	44	2nd Semi	Inverell Saints	13	11	89	New England Nomads	10	9	69
Tamworth Kangaroos	11	0	4	0	1679	1250	134.32%	44	Preliminary	New England Nomads	14	13	97	Tamworth Kangaroos	12	11	83
Gunnedah & District	4	0	11	0	1270	1697	74.84%	16	Grand	New England Nomads	15	11	101	Inverell Saints	11	9	75
Tamworth Swans	3	0	12	0	1013	1594	63.55%	12									
Muswellbrook Cats	3	0	12	0	789	1898	41.57%	12									

== 2013 Ladder ==
Tamworth AFL	Wins	Byes	Losses	Draws	For	Against	%	Pts	Final	Team	G	B	Pts	Team	G	B	Pts
New England Nomads	14	0	1	0	1787	647	276.20%	56	1st Semi	Tamworth Kangaroos	15	18	108	Muswellbrook Cats	10	14	74
Inverell Saints	11	0	4	0	1671	874	191.19%	44	2nd Semi	New England Nomads	15	18	108	Inverell Saints	2	4	16
Tamworth Kangaroos	11	0	4	0	1582	1157	136.73%	44	Preliminary	Inverell Saints	20	18	138	Tamworth Kangaroos	12	7	79
Muswellbrook Cats	4	0	11	0	876	1808	48.45%	16	Grand	New England Nomads	27	14	176	Inverell Saints	5	6	36
Tamworth Swans	2	0	12	0	862	1541	55.94%	8									
Gunnedah & District	2	0	12	0	934	1685	55.43%	8									

== 2014 Ladder ==
Tamworth AFL	Wins	Byes	Losses	Draws	For	Against	%	Pts	Final	Team	G	B	Pts	Team	G	B	Pts
New England Nomads	14	0	1	0	1853	813	227.92%	56	1st Semi	Tamworth Kangaroos	25	27	177	Narrabri Eagles	5	4	34
Inverell Saints	12	0	3	0	1670	877	190.42%	48	2nd Semi	New England Nomads	16	11	107	Inverell Saints	5	9	39
Tamworth Kangaroos	9	0	6	0	1399	1102	126.95%	36	Preliminary	Inverell Saints	12	15	87	Tamworth Kangaroos	10	9	69
Narrabri Eagles	6	0	9	0	1070	1648	64.93%	24	Grand	New England Nomads	13	7	85	Inverell Saints	6	9	45
Tamworth Swans	3	0	12	0	819	1481	55.30%	12									
Gunnedah & District	1	0	14	0	862	1752	49.20%	4									

== 2015 Ladder ==
Tamworth AFL	Wins	Byes	Losses	Draws	For	Against	%	Pts	Final	Team	G	B	Pts	Team	G	B	Pts
New England Nomads	14	0	1	0	2162	736	293.75%	56	1st Semi	Inverell Saints	12	22	94	Narrabri Eagles	7	9	51
Tamworth Kangaroos	12	0	2	1	1810	878	206.15%	50	2nd Semi	New England Nomads	17	16	118	Tamworth Kangaroos	10	10	70
Inverell Saints	9	0	6	0	1631	1172	139.16%	36	Preliminary	Tamworth Kangaroos	17	11	113	Inverell Saints	12	4	76
Narrabri Eagles	8	0	7	0	1461	1424	102.60%	32	Grand	New England Nomads	10	12	72	Tamworth Kangaroos	9	7	61
Gunnedah & District	7	0	9	0	1355	1694	79.99%	28									
Tamworth Swans	1	0	13	1	624	1853	33.68%	6									
Moree Suns	1	0	14	0	759	2045	37.11%	4									

== 2016 Ladder ==
Tamworth AFL	Wins	Byes	Losses	Draws	For	Against	%	Pts	Final	Team	G	B	Pts	Team	G	B	Pts
New England Nomads	15	0	0	0	2296	474	484.39%	60	1st Semi	Gunnedah	14	11	95	Inverell Saints	13	6	84
Tamworth Kangaroos	11	0	4	0	1872	804	232.84%	44	2nd Semi	New England Nomads	15	19	109	Tamworth Kangaroos	3	4	22
Inverell Saints	10	0	5	0	1598	974	164.07%	40	Preliminary	Tamworth Kangaroos	12	12	84	Gunnedah	10	9	69
Gunnedah & District	9	0	6	0	1525	1144	133.30%	36	Grand	New England Nomads	19	18	132	Tamworth Kangaroos	6	4	40
Tamworth Swans	4	0	11	0	871	1599	54.47%	16									
Moree Suns	2	0	13	0	653	2314	28.22%	8									
Narrabri Eagles	2	0	14	0	525	2031	25.85%	8									

== 2017 Ladder ==
AFL North West	Wins	Byes	Losses	Draws	For	Against	%	Pts	Final	Team	G	B	Pts	Team	G	B	Pts
Gunnedah & District	12	0	2	0	1897	799	237.42%	48	1st Semi	Inverell Saints	0	0	0	Tamworth Kangaroos	0	0	0
New England Nomads	10	0	4	0	1844	869	212.20%	40	2nd Semi	Gunnedah	15	18	108	New England Nomads	6	9	45
Inverell Saints	9	0	5	0	1469	1042	140.98%	36	Preliminary	New England Nomads	18	4	112	Inverell Saints	10	12	72
Tamworth Kangaroos	6	0	8	0	1465	1239	118.24%	24	Grand	Gunnedah	15	16	106	New England Nomads	13	8	86
Moree Suns	3	0	10	0	809	1992	40.61%	12									
Tamworth Swans	0	0	13	0	481	2275	21.14%	0									

== 2018 Ladder ==
AFL North West	Wins	Byes	Losses	Draws	For	Against	%	Pts	Final	Team	G	B	Pts	Team	G	B	Pts
Inverell Saints	13	0	2	0	2128	600	354.67%	52	1st Semi	New England Nomads	22	12	144	Tamworth Kangaroos	9	5	59
Gunnedah & District	11	0	4	0	1978	836	236.60%	44	2nd Semi	Inverell Saints	8	10	58	Gunnedah	4	6	30
New England Nomads	11	0	5	0	1693	1191	142.15%	44	Preliminary	Gunnedah	10	11	71	New England Nomads	9	13	67
Tamworth Kangaroos	6	0	9	0	1128	1295	87.10%	24	Grand	Inverell Saints	11	12	78	Gunnedah	10	2	62
Tamworth Swans	5	0	10	0	1113	1552	71.71%	20									
Narrabri Eagles	5	0	11	0	957	1940	49.33%	20									
Moree Suns	3	0	13	0	704	2287	30.78%	12									

== 2019 Ladder ==
AFL North West	Wins	Byes	Losses	Draws	For	Against	%	Pts	Final	Team	G	B	Pts	Team	G	B	Pts
Inverell Saints	9	0	1	0	1327	511	259.69%	36	1st Semi	New England Nomads	9	11	65	Tamworth Kangaroos	2	7	19
Gunnedah & District	9	0	1	0	1242	633	196.21%	36	2nd Semi	Gunnedah	12	8	80	Inverell Saints	4	11	35
New England Nomads	5	0	5	0	994	869	114.38%	20	Preliminary	New England Nomads	11	10	76	Inverell Saints	9	11	65
Tamworth Swans	5	0	5	0	793	939	84.45%	20	Grand	Gunnedah	13	12	90	New England Nomads	11	13	79
Tamworth Kangaroos	2	0	8	0	725	1102	65.79%	8									
Moree Suns	0	0	10	0	430	1457	29.51%	0									

== See also ==
- AFL NSW/ACT
- Australian rules football in New South Wales
- Group 4 Rugby League
- Group 19 Rugby League
