= Summerland Australian Football League =

The Summerland Australian Football League or SAFL was an Australian rules football competition in the Northern Rivers and New England region of New South Wales, Australia, in existence from 1984 to 2011. It now is reformed under the AFL Queensland banner under various QFA divisions, currently QFA Division 2 South/Northern Rivers.

== History ==
The Northern Rivers region is a competitive area for sports including football, rugby league and rugby union. This has caused a continual struggle for strong numbers at all the clubs and therefore has caused several teams to fold over its history.

The Summerland AFL was formed in 1984, with Ballina, Byron, the Goonellabah Swans and Lismore Kangaroos as foundation clubs. Ballina and Byron are the only clubs to have continued in the same form for the entire history of the league, and the two clubs have dominated the competition for most of its history, being premiers 17 out of 27 seasons and winning every flag between 1999 and 2009.

The Murwillumbah Hawks joined in 1985, and the league continued in this form until 1994.

In 1995 the Grafton Tigers joined from the North Coast AFL, temporarily bringing the number of clubs to six, until Murwillumbah folded after the 1999 season.

The Nimbin Demons first joined in 1988 making it to the preliminary final the first two years but after disbanding in the mid 90's re-joined in 2001, bringing the number of clubs back up to six. However, at the end of this season, Grafton returned to the North Coast AFL, and the Lismore Kangaroos went bankrupt and merged with Goonellabah to form the Lismore Swans.

The Casino Lions formed in 2003 and competed for the next five seasons. Murwillumbah also rejoined for the seasons 2004–06.

In 2009, the Tweed Coast Tigers joined the league. Byron won the premiership for the third year running, but not until after Lismore lodged an appeal against the umpires' decision that disallowed a goal after the game concluded. The appeal was dismissed.

In 2010, the league featured six senior clubs, after the admission of Coolangatta-Tweed Heads. Coolangatta field two senior teams in the AFL Queensland, and their third senior side, based around under 23 and developing players, in the Summerland AFL. The Tweed Coast Tigers won the premiership in that season, the first team to break the Byron-Ballina stranglehold on the cup since 1998.

In 2011, the league started with six teams again but midway through the season Coolangatta and Nimbin withdrew from the competition. This forced a re draw for the rest of the season. After the Home and Away season Tweed Coast finished first, followed by Ballina, Lismore and Byron Bay. The grand final was played between Tweed Coast and Lismore and Lismore won their first premiership as a merged club.

In 2012, all four clubs joined AFL South East Queensland and commenced the season in Division 4 South.

== Clubs ==
=== Final clubs ===
Club	Colours	Nickname	Home Ground	Former League	Est.	Years in SAFL	SAFL Senior Premierships		Fate
Club	Colours	Nickname	Home Ground	Former League	Est.	Years in SAFL	Total	Years	Fate
Ballina		Bombers	Fripp Oval, Ballina	–	1984	1984–2011	5	1995, 1996, 2002, 2005, 2006	Formed Queensland FA Northern Rivers division in 2011
Byron		Magpies	Cavanbah Centre, Byron Bay	–	1984	1984–2011	12	1985, 1992, 1993, 1994, 1999, 2000, 2001, 2003, 2004, 2007, 2008, 2009	Formed Queensland FA Northern Rivers division in 2011
Coolangatta Tweed Heads thirds		Blues	Len Peak Oval, Coolangatta	–	1962	2010–2011	0	–	Disbanded midway through 2011 season
Lismore (Goonellabah-Alstonville 1984–2002)		Swans	Gloria Mortimer Oval, Lismore	–	1984	2002–2011	2	1984, 2011	Formed Queensland FA Northern Rivers division in 2011
Nimbin		Demons	Nimbin Showgrounds, Nimbin	–	1988	1988–1992, 2001–2005, 2007–2011	0	–	Recesses in 1993–2000 and 2006. Folded midway through 2011 season. Re-formed in Northern Rivers Cup in 2025
Tweed Coast		Tigers	Barry Sheppard Oval, Bogangar	–	2009	2009–2011	1	2010	Formed Queensland FA Northern Rivers division in 2011

=== Former clubs ===
Club	Colours	Nickname	Home Ground	Former league	Est.	Years in SAFL	SAFL Senior Premierships		Fate
Club	Colours	Nickname	Home Ground	Former league	Est.	Years in SAFL	Total	Years	Fate
Casino		Lions	Queen Elizabeth Park, Casino	–	2003	2003–2007	0	–	Entered recess after 2007 season, re-formed in AFL North Coast in 2021
Grafton		Tigers	Ellem Oval, Grafton	NCAFL	1982	1996–2001	0	–	Returned to North Coast AFL in 2002
Lismore Kangaroos		Kangaroos	Gloria Mortimer Oval, Lismore	–	1984	1984–1999	5	1986, 1987, 1988, 1989, 1990	Folded due to financial issues following 1999 season
Murwillumbah		Hawks	John Rabjones Oval, Murwillumbah	–	1985	1985–1999, 2004–2006	3	1991, 1997, 1998	Recess between 2000 and 2003, folded after 2006 season

== Grand Finals ==
Year	Premier	Score	Runner up	Score	Bob Hill Medal
1984	Goonellabah Swans		Lismore Kangaroos		
1985	Byron Magpies		Lismore Kangaroos		
1986	Lismore Kangaroos				
1987	Lismore Kangaroos (2)				
1988	Lismore Kangaroos (3)	17.16. (118)	Murwillumbah Hawks	17.14. (1116)	
1989	Lismore Kangaroos (4)		Murwillumbah Hawks		
1990	Lismore Kangaroos (5)	12.21. (93)	Murwillumbah Hawks	6.14. (50)	
1991	Murwillumbah Hawks	18.13. (121)	Byron Magpies	7.11. (53)	Ben Sloan
1992	Byron Magpies (2)	19.14. (128)	Lismore Kangaroos	13.10. (88)	
1993	Byron Magpies (3)		Ballina Bombers		
1994	Byron Magpies (4)				
1995	Ballina Bombers	13.15. (93)	Byron Magpies	12.18. (90)	
1996	Ballina Bombers (2)	6.16. (52)	Lismore Kangaroos	5.19. (49)	
1997	Murwillumbah Hawks (2)	20.8. (128)	Ballina Bombers	13.6. (84)	
1998	Murwillumbah Hawks (3)				
1999	Byron Magpies (5)				
2000	Byron Magpies (6)	8.8. (56)	Ballina Bombers	7.2. (44)	
2001	Byron Magpies (7)	18.8. (116)	Ballina Bombers	8.7. (55)	
2002	Ballina Bombers (3)	11.3. (69)	Byron Magpies	7.6. (48)	
2003	Byron Magpies (8)	15.12. (102)	Nimbin Demons	12.11. (83)	
2004	Byron Magpies (9)	21.8. (134)	Ballina Bombers	6.6. (42)	
2005	Ballina Bombers (4)	12.6. (78)	Lismore Swans	7.17. (59)	
2006	Ballina Bombers (5)	13.16. (94)	Lismore Swans	13.11. (89)	Brian Walsh
2007	Byron Magpies (10)	8.8. (56)	Ballina Bombers	5.7. (37)	
2008	Byron Magpies (11)	13.16. (94)	Ballina Bombers	9.11. (65)	
2009	Byron Magpies (12)	12.9. (81)	Lismore Swans	12.4. (76)	George Massa
2010	Tweed Coast Tigers	11.16. (82)	Lismore Swans	8.6. (54)	Ash Gemmill
2011	Lismore Swans (2)	17.10. (112)	Tweed Coast Tigers	16.8. (104)	Ben Hughes

== See also ==
- AFL NSW/ACT
- Australian rules football in New South Wales
