= Erica Fowler =

Australian rules footballer

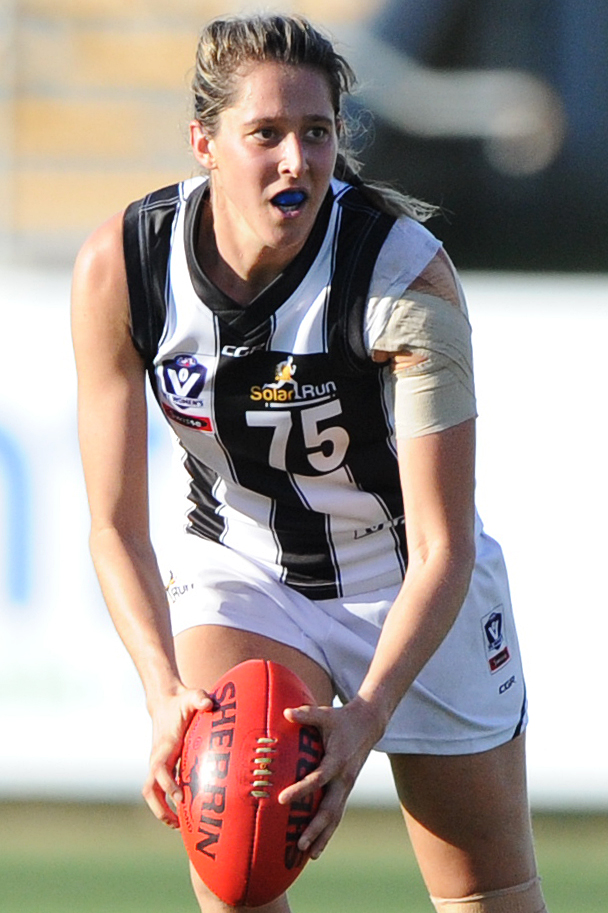
- Fowler playing for Collingwood's VFLW team in June 2018

Personal information
- Born: 8 July 1992 (age 34)
- Original team: Yeronga (QWAFL)
- Draft: No. 70, 2018 AFLW draft
- Debut: Round 1, 2019, Collingwood vs. Geelong, at GMHBA Stadium
- Height: 180 cm (5 ft 11 in)
- Position: Forward / Ruck

Club information
- Current club: Geelong
- Number: 17

Playing career^{1}
Years	Club	Games (Goals)
2019–2024	Collingwood	46 (2)
2025–	Geelong	1 (0)
Total		47 (2)
- ^{1} Playing statistics correct to the end of round 2, 2025.

Erica Fowler (born 8 July 1992) is an Australian rules footballer who plays for Geelong in the AFL Women's (AFLW). She has previously played for Collingwood. Originally a rugby sevens player, Fowler joined Collingwood's VFL Women's team and became a senior player after she was selected with the club's ninth selection and the 70th pick overall in the 2018 AFLW draft. She made her debut in a loss to Geelong at GMHBA Stadium in round 1 of the 2019 season.

== Early life ==
Fowler originally played rugby sevens, representing the University of Queensland nationally. She also played 33 games for Yeronga in the Queensland Women's Australian Football League (QWAFL) and its lower division, the Queensland Women's Football Association. Fowler suffered injury and illness in 2016, causing her to miss the Australian University Games and leaving her with a choice between her sporting and paramedicine careers. She was part of the Yeronga team victorious over Coorparoo in the 2017 QWAFL grand final. Fowler accepted an offer to join Collingwood's VFL Women's side in 2018 and split her time between sport and work, travelling from Brisbane to Melbourne every few weeks to play.

== AFLW career ==
For the 2018 AFLW draft, Collingwood was granted two chances to pre-select recruits to compensate for losing players to injury and rival clubs, using a similar bidding mechanism to the father–daughter rule. The club selected Fowler with pick 70; she was expected to play as a key forward and ruckwoman assisting Eliza Hynes, because of her 180-centimetre stature. She hoped her rugby sevens experience would bring "a different physicality and athleticism to the game". In November 2024, Fowler was delisted by Collingwood.

In May 2025, after standing out for Sandringham during six VFL Women's matches, Fowler was signed by AFLW club Geelong.

== Statistics ==
Statistics are correct the end of the 2024 season.

Legend
G	Goals	K	Kicks	D	Disposals	T	Tackles
B	Behinds	H	Handballs	M	Marks	H/O	Hit-outs

Season	Team	No.	Games	Totals								Averages (per game)							
Season	Team	No.	Games	G	B	K	H	D	M	T	H/O	G	B	K	H	D	M	T	H/O
2019	Collingwood	15	2	0	0	6	3	9	3	14	23	0.0	0.0	3.0	1.5	4.5	1.5	7.0	11.5
2020	Collingwood	15	7	0	2	26	18	44	16	19	9	0.0	0.3	3.7	2.6	6.3	2.3	2.7	1.3
2021	Collingwood	15	10	0	1	37	20	57	12	25	17	0.0	0.1	3.7	2.0	5.7	1.2	2.5	1.7
2022 (S6)	Collingwood	15	9	0	1	29	15	44	9	11	15	0.0	0.1	3.2	1.7	4.9	1.0	1.2	1.7
2022 (S7)	Collingwood	15	2	0	0	5	4	9	4	1	4	0.0	0.0	2.5	2.0	4.5	2.0	1.0	2.0
2023	Collingwood	15	9	2	0	31	9	40	11	22	63	0.2	0.0	3.4	1.0	4.4	1.2	2.4	7.0
2024	Collingwood	15	7	0	3	19	13	32	10	14	3	0.0	0.4	2.7	1.9	4.6	1.4	2.0	0.4
Career			46	2	7	153	82	235	65	106	134	0.04	0.2	3.3	1.8	5.1	1.4	2.3	2.9
