= Byron AFL Football Club =

Byron Bay Magpies

Names
- Full name: Byron Bay AFL Football Club
- Nickname: Magpies
- Club song: "Good old Byron Bay Forever"
- After finals: 1st

Club details
- Founded: 1984; 42 years ago
- Colours: White and Black
- Competition: QAFA Northern Rivers
- President: Michael Young
- Coach: Brett Porter
- Captain: David Smith
- Ground: Ewingsdale AFL sports complex

Uniforms
Home

Other information
- Official website: byronbayafl.com.au

Byron Bay AFL Football Club, also known as the Byron Bay Magpies, is a Byron Bay, New South Wales based club competing in the QAFA Northern Rivers competition. It was founded in 1984.

Formed in 1984 the Magpies played in the Summerland AFL until it was merged into the Queensland State League in 2011.

From 2012 the club played in the SEQAFL Division 4 South/Northern Rivers league.

In 2014 the club joined and played in the QAFA (Northern Rivers) league where it remains.

== Premierships ==
Summerland Australian Football League and QAFA (Northern Rivers):

- 1985, 1992, 1993, 1994, 1999, 2000, 2001, 2003, 2004, 2007, 2008, 2009, 2016

2016 Premiership side:

B. Shane Morritt. Daniel Tiffin. Andrew Fyffe.

HB. Jackson Coppin. Sam Mitchell. Sam Dennis.

C. Zac Sullivan. Rhys Lavery. Gus Staley.

HF. Will McBride. Zeke Hower. Alex Margan.

F. Ryan McMillan. Kieran Atkin. Brett Porter.

R. Sam Buultjens. Nathan Moon. David Smith.

Int. Ian Dock. Crispin Myres. Kalani Fallon. Heath Griggs.

== See also ==
- AFL NSW/ACT
- Australian rules football in New South Wales
- https://www.australianrulesfootball.com.au/pages/ByronFC
- http://websites.sportstg.com/team_info.cgi?id=20492544&client=1-109-124608-407179-20492544&compID=407179
