= Molly Ritson =

Australian rules footballer

Personal information
- Born: 12 August 1999 (age 27)
- Original team: Bond University (QAFLW)
- Draft: No. 14, 2017 AFL Women's draft
- Height: 170 cm (5 ft 7 in)
- Position: 69

Playing career^{1}
Years	Club	Games (Goals)
2018	Brisbane	0 (0)
2020–2021	Gold Coast	9 (0)
Total		9 (0)
- ^{1} Playing statistics correct to the end of the 2021 season.

Molly Ritson (born 12 August 1999) is an Australian rules footballer who played for Brisbane and Gold Coast in the AFL Women's competition (AFLW).

== Early life ==
Ritson grew up on the Gold Coast and attended Aquinas College throughout her upbringing. She began playing junior football with Surfers Paradise at a young age before switching to Southport and ultimately Bond University in an attempt to be drafted. Her decision paid off when the Brisbane Lions drafted her with the 14th pick in the 2017 AFL Women's rookie draft.

== AFLW career ==
Ritson was not given the opportunity to debut for Brisbane due to an injury while contracted in 2018 and was subsequently delisted at the end of the season. She returned to Bond University for the 2019 season where she impressed enough to be selected by her hometown team, the Gold Coast Suns, to be a part of their inaugural 2020 season list. Ritson made her AFLW debut against Greater Western Sydney in round 1 of the 2020 season. At the end of the 2021 season, Ritson was delisted by Gold Coast after playing nine matches across two seasons.

== Statistics ==
Legend
G	Goals	K	Kicks	D	Disposals	T	Tackles
B	Behinds	H	Handballs	M	Marks

Season	Team	No.	Games	Totals							Averages (per game)							Votes
Season	Team	No.	Games	G	B	K	H	D	M	T	G	B	K	H	D	M	T	Votes
2018	Brisbane	30	0	—	—	—	—	—	—	—	—	—	—	—	—	—	—	0
2020	Gold Coast	12	7	0	0	37	11	48	7	4	0.0	0.0	5.3	1.6	6.9	1.0	0.6	0
2021	Gold Coast	12	2	0	0	6	2	8	2	3	0.0	0.0	3.0	1.0	4.0	1.0	1.5	0
Career			9	0	0	43	13	56	9	7	0.0	0.0	4.8	1.4	6.2	1.0	0.8	0
