= 2026 AFL Women's season =

Eleventh season of the AFL Women's (AFLW) competition

- Carlton and Richmond players contest the football in round 7

Overview
- Date: 9 August – 27 November 2026
- Teams: 18
- Minor premiers: North Melbourne; 3rd minor premiership
- Leading goalkicker: Chloe Molloy (Sydney)

Attendance
- Matches played: 59
- Total attendance: 198,434 (3,363 per match)
- Highest: 20,455 (round 1, St Kilda v Carlton)
- Updated to Melbourne v North Melbourne (round 7).

The 2026 AFL Women's season is the eleventh season of the AFL Women's (AFLW) competition, the highest-level senior women's Australian rules football competition in Australia. The season features 18 clubs and will run from 9 August until the final weekend of November, comprising a twelve-round home-and-away season.

== Background ==
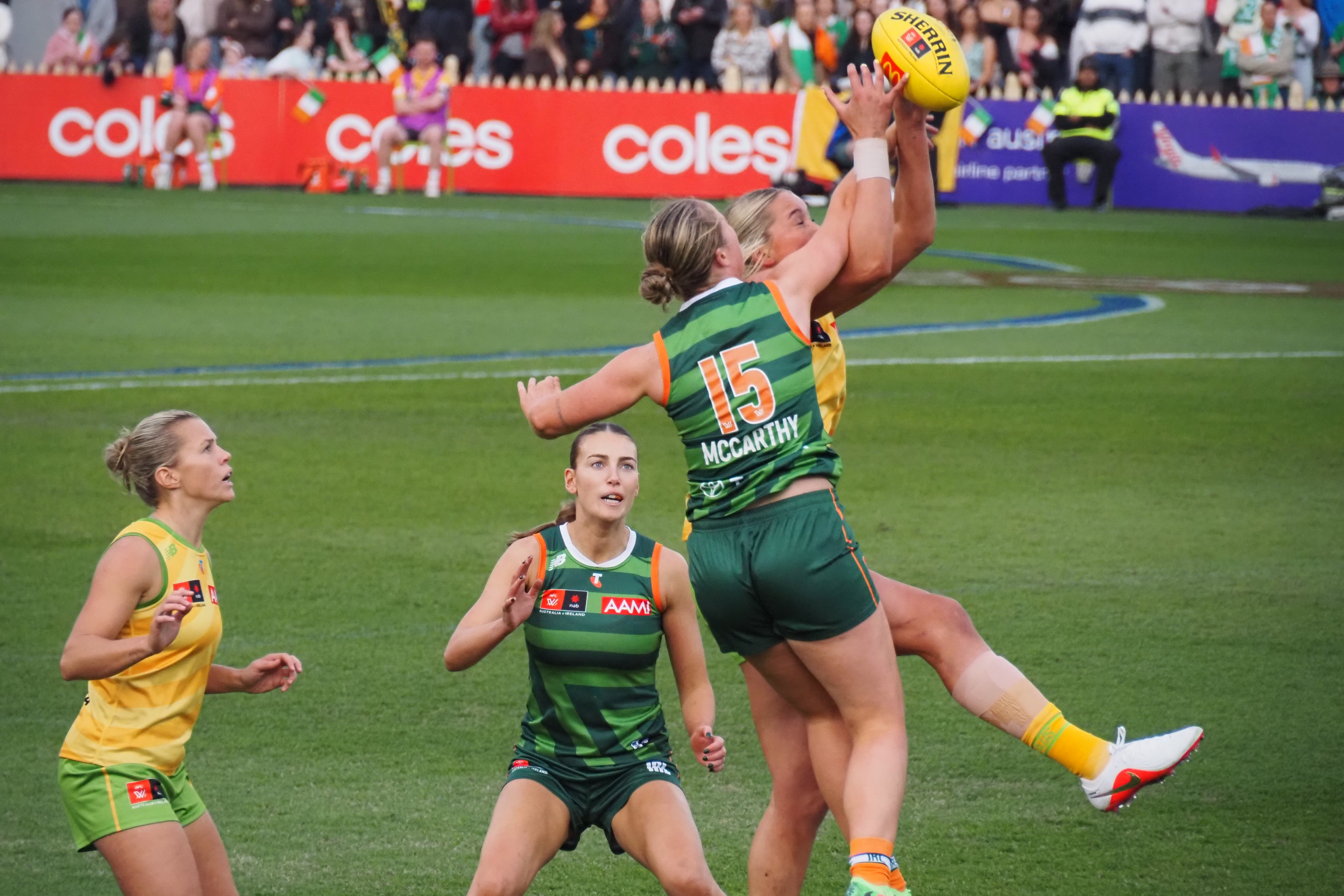
Matilda Scholz (Australia) flies for a mark during the Australia v Ireland match

The 2025 season marked the end of a ten-season, league-wide partnership between the AFL Women's and Cotton On, which had supplied apparel for all 18 clubs since the competition's inception, meaning that clubs could partner with their existing Australian Football League (AFL) suppliers for the first time; by October 2025, midway through the season, North Melbourne was the first club to announce such a partnership, with its new deal with Kookaburra covering all four of its teams. Hawthorn was the only club to partner with a separate supplier for its AFLW team, opting for Jaggad, owned by former AFL players Steve Greene and Chris Judd.

In April 2026, AFLW executive general manager Laura Kane announced that the 2026 season would feature four double-headers with AFL matches, including at least one at the AFL-owned Marvel Stadium, after several clubs asked for double-headers as part of their fixture requests; only six AFL/AFLW double-headers had been held previously, with the league prioritising smaller venues in recent seasons. Kane later elaborated that opinions of double-headers in the competition had changed over the years; clubs had previously wanted to avoid AFLW matches being seen as curtain-raisers to AFL matches, but there had been growing interest from players to play in double-headers and at larger venues, and clubs had started to take a "one-club approach". This approach was further reinforced by a growing number of AFLW players assuming roles as game day hosts for their clubs during the AFL season, both to upskill their public speaking and off-field development and cross-promote the AFLW season at men's matches.

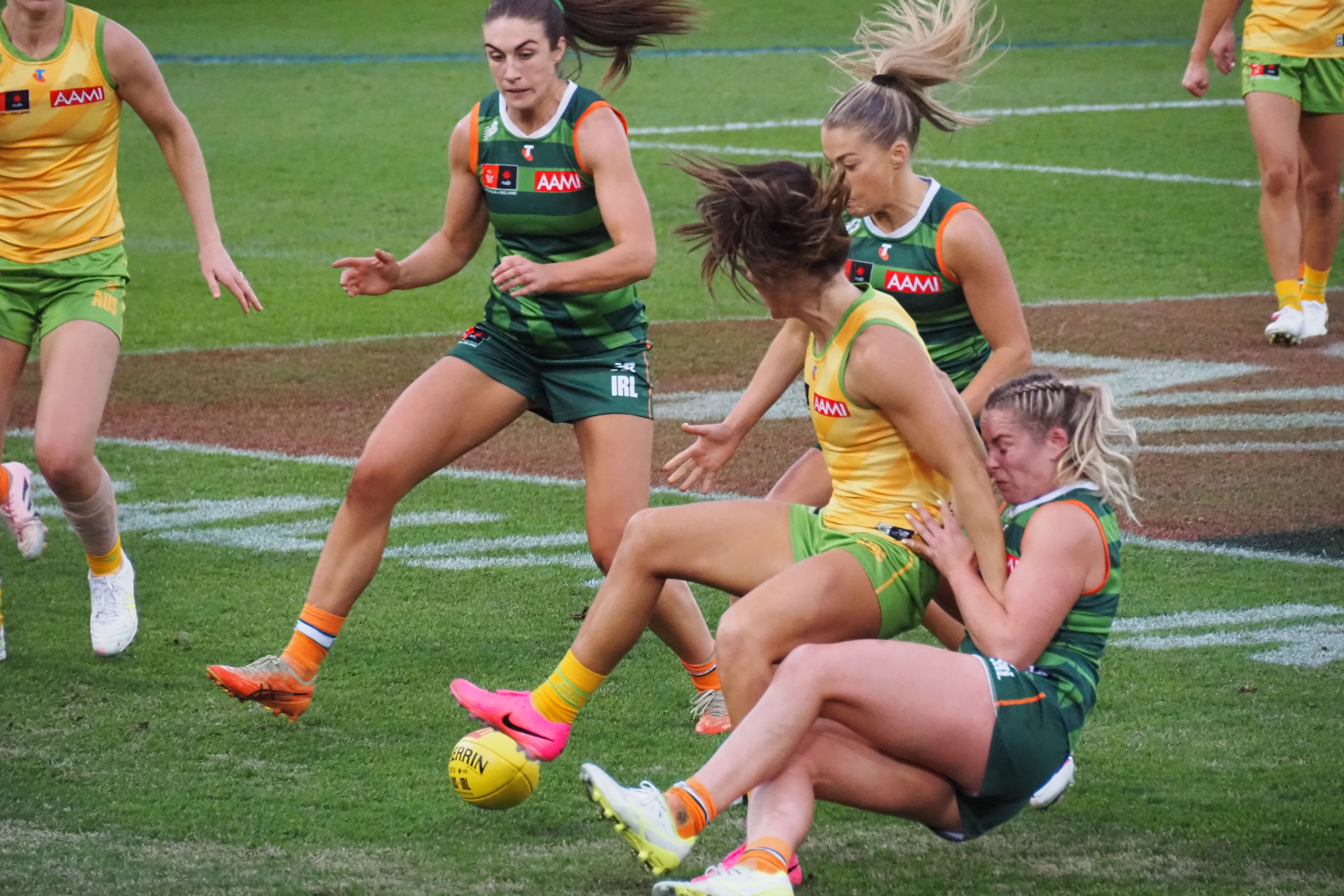
Aisling McCarthy (Ireland) tackles an opponent during the Australia v Ireland match

The competition's first pre-season draft was held on 4 May, with players returning to their clubs for pre-season training a week later. Earlier in the year, the AFL pitched the concept of an expanded pre-season schedule to clubs to further assist in the development of younger and inexperienced players, giving clubs the option of playing up to five unofficial match simulations and an official practice match; clubs had previously only played one of each, with some also utilising state leagues to varying degrees. Clubs eventually agreed to a schedule of three match simulations and a practice match beginning in early July. A vision-based score review system was introduced for the season, replacing the seldom-used ball-tracking technology introduced in 2024, with four goal post cameras installed at each AFLW venue; the new review system was similar to the one used in the AFL, where an official would review every score based on Hawk-Eye vision, but did not give the option for goal umpires to call for a score review.

A representative Australian rules football match between the competition's best Australian and Irish players was held at North Sydney Oval on 1 August, the first AFLW representative match since the 2017 State of Origin match; the league chose not to schedule a twilight match in the AFL on that day to avoid an overlap with the representative match, which was broadcast live on Fox Footy, Kayo Sports, Kayo Freebies and Binge. The match sold out weeks in advance, but the AFL resisted calls from players to move it to the larger Sydney Cricket Ground, preferring to keep the match at a sold-out smaller venue rather than a partially-filled larger venue; the league instead set up a ticket waitlist for tickets that became available closer to the match and partnered with several venues in Sydney and Melbourne to host watch parties. Australia won the encounter by 50 points, in a match described by afl.com.au as "a thrilling exhibition of international football" and by Fox Sports as "an entertaining clash full of highlights" that showcased the competition's evolution.

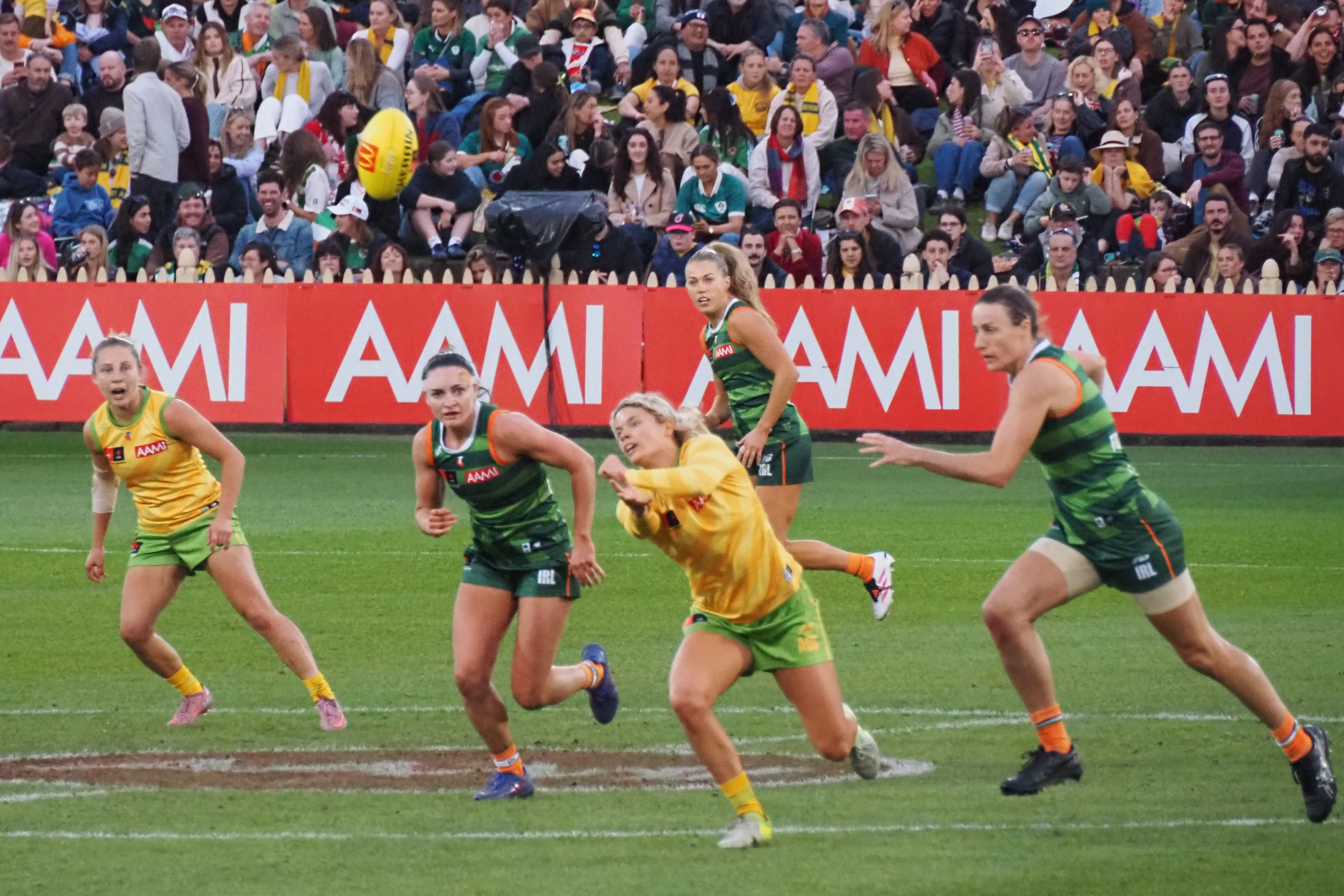
Georgie Prespakis (Australia) handballs to a teammate during the Australia v Ireland match

Leading into the season, North Melbourne, which had not lost a match since the 2023 AFL Women's Grand Final, was predicted unanimously by experts from Fox Sports and ESPN, and by all but one expert from the Herald Sun, to win a third consecutive premiership; 15 club captains tipped North Melbourne as the club most likely outside their own to reach the grand final, with Melbourne and Brisbane the other clubs tipped to feature. North Melbourne's Jasmine Garner and West Coast's Ella Roberts were the two pre-season favourites to win the AFL Women's best and fairest award.

== Coach appointments ==
New coach	Club	Date of appointment	Previous coach	Ref.
Ryan Davis	Adelaide	2 December 2025	Matthew Clarke	
Mick Stinear	Geelong	10 December 2025	Dan Lowther	
Colin O'Riordan	Sydney	17 December 2025	Scott Gowans	
Jarrad Donders	Richmond	24 February 2026	Ryan Ferguson	
Glenn Strachan	Port Adelaide	11 March 2026	Lauren Arnell	
Tom Wilson	Melbourne	7 April 2026	Mick Stinear	

== Club leadership ==
Club	Coach	Leadership group			
Club	Coach	Captain(s)	Vice-captain(s)	Other leader(s)	Ref.
Adelaide	Ryan Davis	Ebony Marinoff	Eloise Jones	Jess Allan, Chelsea Biddell, Grace Egan, Grace Kelly, Niamh Kelly	
Brisbane	Craig Starcevich	Breanna Koenen	Belle Dawes, Nat Grider	Ally Anderson, Sophie Conway, Jennifer Dunne, Jade Ellenger, Cathy Svarc, Ruby Svarc	
Carlton	Mathew Buck	Abbie McKay	Mimi Hill	Tara Bohanna, Harriet Cordner, Erone Fitzpatrick	
Collingwood	Sam Wright	Ruby Schleicher	Jordyn Allen	Lucy Cronin	
Essendon	Natalie Wood	Bonnie Toogood	Maddi Gay	Steph Cain, Amy Gaylor, Steph Wales	
Fremantle	Lisa Webb	Ange Stannett	Gabby Newton	Emma O'Driscoll (dvc), Megan Kauffman, Jessica Low, Hayley Miller, Mim Strom	
Geelong	Mick Stinear	Nina Morrison, Rebecca Webster			
Gold Coast	Rhyce Shaw	Niamh McLaughlin, Lucy Single	Maddy Brancatisano, Meara Girvan, Charlie Rowbottom		
Greater Western Sydney	Cam Bernasconi	Rebecca Beeson		Tarni Evans, Georgia Garnett, Tilly Lucas-Rodd, Cambridge McCormick, Alyce Parker	
Hawthorn	Daniel Webster	Emily Bates	Eliza West	Jasmine Fleming, Áine McDonagh, Tamara Smith, Lucy Wales	
Melbourne	Tom Wilson	Kate Hore	Tyla Hanks	Maeve Chaplin, Tahlia Gillard, Eliza McNamara	
North Melbourne	Darren Crocker	Jasmine Garner	Ash Riddell	Libby Birch, Nicole Bresnehan, Jasmine Ferguson	
Port Adelaide	Glenn Strachan	Justine Mules-Robinson	Amelie Borg, Sachi Syme	Ella Heads, Maria Moloney, Julia Teakle	
Richmond	Jarrad Donders	Ellie McKenzie, Gabby Seymour	Monique Conti	Sarah Hosking, Beth Lynch, Rebecca Miller	
St Kilda	Nick Dal Santo	Serene Watson	Tyanna Smith	Molly McDonald, Georgia Patrikios, Paige Trudgeon	
Sydney	Colin O'Riordan	Lucy McEvoy	Cynthia Hamilton, Sofia Hurley		
West Coast	Daisy Pearce	Bella Lewis, Charlie Thomas	Mikayla Western	Jaide Britton, Emma Swanson, Lauren Wakfer	
Western Bulldogs	Tamara Hyett	Deanna Berry, Isabelle Pritchard		Alice Edmonds, Jess Fitzgerald, Isabella Grant	

== Pre-season ==
=== Practice matches ===
All starting times are local time. Source: afl.com.au (results, reports)

	Official practice matches
Friday, 24 July (12:00 pm)	West Coast 6.12 (48)	def. by	Collingwood 8.4 (52)	Mineral Resources Park
Friday, 24 July (2:00 pm)	Sydney 5.4 (34)	def. by	Hawthorn 8.11 (59)	Sydney Cricket Ground
Saturday, 25 July (10:30 am)	North Melbourne 11.5 (71)	def.	Essendon 3.7 (25)	Avalon Airport Oval
Saturday, 25 July (11:30 am)	Port Adelaide 6.7 (43)	def. by	Melbourne 7.6 (48)	Alberton Oval
Saturday, 25 July (12:00 pm)	Gold Coast 3.5 (23)	def. by	Carlton 5.3 (33)	People First Stadium
Saturday, 25 July (10:30 am)	Fremantle 4.6 (30)	def. by	Richmond 6.10 (46)	The Good Grocer Park
Saturday, 25 July (1:00 pm)	Adelaide 10.11 (71)	def.	St Kilda 4.2 (26)	Thomas Farms Oval
Saturday, 25 July (2:15 pm)	Brisbane 8.9 (57)	def.	Geelong 8.6 (54)	Brighton Homes Arena
Sunday, 26 July (2:35 pm)	Greater Western Sydney 3.4 (22)	def. by	Western Bulldogs 9.11 (65)	Henson Park

=== Australia v Ireland ===
Starting time is local time. Source: afl.com.au

AFLW Australia v Ireland
Saturday, 1 August (4:15 pm)	Australia 13.13 (91)	def.	Ireland 6.5 (41)	North Sydney Oval (crowd: 9,017)	Report
3.6 (24); 9.7 (61); 11.9 (75); 13.13 (91)	Q1; Q2; Q3; Q4	2.0 (12); 5.1 (31); 5.4 (34); 6.5 (41)	Best on ground: Jasmine Garner (Australia)
Randall 4, Molloy 2, Conti, Conway, Fish, Garner, Hodder, Hore, Morrison	Goals	Bogue 3, Dooley, McLaughlin, O'Dwyer
Garner, Randall, Riddell, Marinoff, Strom, Conti	Best	Bogue, A. McCarthy, Rowe, O'Shea, O'Dwyer, Dunne

== Overview ==
Essendon and West Coast players contest the football in round 7

The season will feature a twelve-round home-and-away season and conclude with the 2026 AFL Women's Grand Final on the final weekend of November. The season began on 9 August with a double-header at Marvel Stadium, with St Kilda hosting Carlton before the same clubs' AFL teams played in the sixth annual Spud's Game, held to honour former St Kilda AFL captain Danny Frawley and raise funds for mental health; the remaining round 1 matches will take place the following weekend, including two more AFL/AFLW double-headers, while Sydney will host Essendon in round 2 at the Sydney Cricket Ground before its AFL match against North Melbourne. For the third consecutive season, the Dreamtime match between Essendon and Richmond will be held in Darwin and Sydney will host a match in Coffs Harbour, this time against St Kilda, with both matches to take place in round 3. The season will also three AFLW double-headers, in rounds 4, 7 and 10. Two clubs shifted their primary home venues to their training facilities, with Fremantle moving its home matches to Cockburn ARC and Hawthorn moving most of its home matches to the newly-built Kennedy Community Centre, while Adelaide moved all of its home matches to Thomas Farms Oval, having previously played some of its home matches at Norwood Oval.

== Home-and-away season ==
All starting times are local time. Source: afl.com.au

=== Round 1 ===
	Round 1
Sunday, 9 August (4:35 pm)	St Kilda 6.4 (40)	def. by	Carlton 9.12 (66)	Marvel Stadium (crowd: 20,455)	Report; Stats
Thursday, 13 August (7:15 pm)	Hawthorn 6.5 (41)	def. by	Melbourne 9.6 (60)	Ikon Park (crowd: 2,879)	Report; Stats
Saturday, 15 August (1:00 pm)	North Melbourne 15.10 (100)	def.	Geelong 3.9 (27)	Marvel Stadium (crowd: 14,573)	Report; Stats
Saturday, 15 August (5:05 pm)	Richmond 6.10 (46)	def.	Collingwood 4.4 (28)	Ikon Park (crowd: 2,146)	Report; Stats
Saturday, 15 August (7:15 pm)	Gold Coast 1.8 (14)	def. by	Western Bulldogs 6.4 (40)	People First Stadium (crowd: 1,170)	Report; Stats
Sunday, 16 August (12:35 pm)	Essendon 6.1 (37)	def. by	Brisbane 12.13 (85)	Windy Hill (crowd: 2,040)	Report; Stats
Sunday, 16 August (12:05 pm)	Adelaide 7.11 (53)	def. by	Sydney 9.7 (61)	Unley Oval (crowd: 3,640)	Report; Stats
Sunday, 16 August (12:35 pm)	Fremantle 2.8 (20)	def. by	Port Adelaide 6.5 (41)	Cockburn ARC (crowd: 2,514)	Report; Stats
Sunday, 16 August (4:45 pm)	Greater Western Sydney 8.6 (54)	def.	West Coast 6.6 (42)	Engie Stadium (crowd: 2,112)	Report; Stats
Geelong's 73-point loss to North Melbourne was the biggest in its history.

=== Round 2 ===
	Round 2
Saturday, 22 August (2:05 pm)	Western Bulldogs 7.6 (48)	def.	Richmond 5.7 (37)	Mission Whitten Oval (crowd: 2,211)	Report; Stats
Saturday, 22 August (12:35 pm)	West Coast 5.4 (34)	def. by	Gold Coast 10.9 (69)	Mineral Resources Park (crowd: 1,332)	Report; Stats
Saturday, 22 August (5:00 pm)	Geelong 16.4 (100)	def.	St Kilda 2.3 (15)	GMHBA Stadium (crowd: 15,266)	Report; Stats
Saturday, 22 August (7:15 pm)	Brisbane 5.3 (33)	def. by	North Melbourne 6.8 (44)	Brighton Homes Arena (crowd: 2,983)	Report; Stats
Sunday, 23 August (12:30 pm)	Sydney 9.12 (66)	def.	Essendon 6.6 (42)	Sydney Cricket Ground (crowd: 16,672)	Report; Stats
Sunday, 23 August (12:35 pm)	Collingwood 4.6 (30)	def. by	Fremantle 8.2 (50)	Victoria Park (crowd: 1,616)	Report; Stats
Sunday, 23 August (2:35 pm)	Melbourne 9.6 (60)	def.	Greater Western Sydney 1.6 (12)	Casey Fields (crowd: 1,505)	Report; Stats
Sunday, 23 August (3:20 pm)	Carlton 7.8 (50)	def.	Adelaide 3.5 (23)	Ikon Park (crowd: 2,012)	Report; Stats
Sunday, 23 August (4:50 pm)	Port Adelaide 5.3 (33)	def. by	Hawthorn 10.5 (65)	Alberton Oval (crowd: 2,706)	Report; Stats
Geelong's 85-point win over St Kilda was the biggest in its history.; The crowd of 16,672 for the Sydney v Essendon match was the largest crowd for a match involving Sydney, more than doubling the previous record.

=== Round 3 ===
	Round 3 (Indigenous Round week 1)
Saturday, 29 August (12:35 pm)	North Melbourne 11.4 (70)	def.	Western Bulldogs 3.5 (23)	University of Tasmania Stadium (crowd: 1,014)	Report; Stats
Saturday, 29 August (2:05 pm)	Adelaide 9.6 (60)	def.	West Coast 6.7 (43)	Thomas Farms Oval (crowd: 2,764)	Report; Stats
Saturday, 29 August (4:35 pm)	Sydney 5.8 (38)	def.	St Kilda 1.9 (15)	C.ex Coffs International Stadium (crowd: 2,709)	Report; Stats
Sunday, 30 August (12:35 pm)	Greater Western Sydney 8.0 (48)	def. by	Port Adelaide 7.10 (52)	Corroboree Group Oval (crowd: 1,902)	Report; Stats
Sunday, 30 August (1:05 pm)	Melbourne 14.5 (89)	def.	Brisbane 4.9 (33)	Casey Fields (crowd: 1,694)	Report; Stats
Sunday, 30 August (3:05 pm)	Gold Coast 8.9 (57)	def. by	Geelong 10.4 (64)	People First Stadium (crowd: 1,838)	Report; Stats
Sunday, 30 August (3:05 pm)	Collingwood 3.8 (26)	def. by	Hawthorn 8.6 (54)	Victoria Park (crowd: 2,604)	Report; Stats
Sunday, 30 August (3:05 pm)	Fremantle 6.6 (42)	def. by	Carlton 7.6 (48)	Cockburn ARC (crowd: 2,752)	Report; Stats
Sunday, 30 August (6:50 pm)	Essendon 4.9 (33)	def. by	Richmond 5.8 (38)	TIO Stadium (crowd: 4,017)	Report; Stats
Brisbane's 56-point loss to Melbourne was the biggest in its history.

=== Round 4 ===
	Round 4 (Indigenous Round week 2)
Saturday, 5 September (12:35 pm)	Western Bulldogs 9.6 (60)	def.	Sydney 5.3 (33)	Mission Whitten Oval (crowd: 2,142)	Report; Stats
Saturday, 5 September (1:05 pm)	St Kilda 1.1 (7)	def. by	North Melbourne 14.15 (99)	RSEA Park (crowd: 1,832)	Report; Stats
Saturday, 5 September (2:05 pm)	Port Adelaide 1.8 (14)	def. by	Gold Coast 2.5 (17)	Alberton Oval (crowd: 2,281)	Report; Stats
Saturday, 5 September (6:35 pm)	Brisbane 7.13 (55)	def.	Greater Western Sydney 3.6 (24)	Brighton Homes Arena (crowd: 2,655)	Report; Stats
Sunday, 6 September (12:30 pm)	Richmond 5.5 (35)	def. by	Fremantle 9.6 (60)	Ikon Park (crowd: 1,931)	Report; Stats
Sunday, 6 September (1:05 pm)	Hawthorn 5.9 (39)	def. by	Adelaide 10.7 (67)	Kennedy Community Centre (crowd: 3,424)	Report; Stats
Sunday, 6 September (2:35 pm)	Geelong 13.5 (83)	def.	Essendon 7.9 (51)	GMHBA Stadium (crowd: 2,862)	Report; Stats
Sunday, 6 September (3:05 pm)	Carlton 10.8 (68)	def.	Collingwood 4.5 (29)	Ikon Park (crowd: 1.979)	Report; Stats
Sunday, 6 September (3:05 pm)	West Coast 6.8 (44)	def. by	Melbourne 12.9 (81)	Mineral Resources Park (crowd: 1,497)	Report; Stats
St Kilda's 92-point loss to North Melbourne was the biggest in its history.

=== Round 5 ===
	Round 5
Saturday, 12 September (1:05 pm)	Hawthorn 6.5 (41)	def.	Western Bulldogs 4.6 (30)	Kennedy Community Centre (crowd: 2,363)	Report; Stats
Saturday, 12 September (2:35 pm)	Gold Coast 9.8 (62)	def.	Collingwood 4.8 (32)	People First Stadium (crowd: 1,472)	Report; Stats
Saturday, 12 September (2:35 pm)	Adelaide 6.10 (46)	def. by	Geelong 8.9 (57)	Thomas Farms Oval (crowd: 2,560)	Report; Stats
Saturday, 12 September (2:35 pm)	West Coast 6.10 (46)	def.	Brisbane 6.5 (41)	Mineral Resources Park (crowd: 1,511)	Report; Stats
Sunday, 13 September (12:35 pm)	Melbourne 11.8 (74)	def.	Port Adelaide 2.11 (23)	Casey Fields (crowd: 1,762)	Report; Stats
Sunday, 13 September (1:05 pm)	Richmond 9.4 (58)	def.	St Kilda 6.7 (43)	Windy Hill (crowd: 1,423)	Report; Stats
Sunday, 13 September (2:35 pm)	Sydney 13.9 (87)	def.	Greater Western Sydney 8.8 (56)	Henson Park (crowd: 7,340)	Report; Stats
Sunday, 13 September (3:05 pm)	North Melbourne 4.9 (33)	def.	Carlton 3.5 (23)	Arden Street Oval (crowd: 4,048)	Report; Stats
Sunday, 13 September (3:05 pm)	Fremantle 5.7 (37)	def.	Essendon 3.4 (22)	Cockburn ARC (crowd: 1,858)	Report; Stats
The crowd of 7,340 for the Sydney v Greater Western Sydney match was the largest crowd for an AFLW match at Henson Park.; The crowd of 4,048 for the North Melbourne v Carlton match was the largest crowd for an AFLW match at Arden Street Oval.

=== Round 6 ===
	Round 6
Friday, 18 September (5:45 pm)	Hawthorn 4.8 (32)	def.	North Melbourne 3.7 (25)	Cazalys Stadium (crowd: 2,118)	Report; Stats
Saturday, 19 September (12:35 pm)	Collingwood 7.7 (49)	def. by	Geelong 14.6 (90)	Victoria Park (crowd: 2,041)	Report; Stats
Saturday, 19 September (1:05 pm)	Melbourne 8.10 (58)	def.	Carlton 3.6 24	Casey Fields (crowd: 1,852)	Report; Stats
Saturday, 19 September (2:05 pm)	Port Adelaide 3.9 (27)	def. by	Sydney 5.11 (41)	Alberton Oval (crowd: 3,247)	Report; Stats
Saturday, 19 September (1:05 pm)	Fremantle 4.6 (30)	def. by	Western Bulldogs 6.4 (40)	Cockburn ARC (crowd: 1,628)	Report; Stats
Sunday, 20 September (12:35 pm)	Greater Western Sydney 10.1 (61)	def. by	Richmond 9.14 (68)	Corroboree Group Oval (crowd: 2,299)	Report; Stats
Sunday, 20 September (1:05 pm)	Essendon 1.4 (10)	def. by	Gold Coast 7.9 (51)	Windy Hill (crowd: 1,781)	Report; Stats
Sunday, 20 September (3:05 pm)	St Kilda 3.7 (25)	def. by	West Coast 5.6 (36)	RSEA Park (crowd: 1,594)	Report; Stats
Sunday, 20 September (5:05 pm)	Brisbane 4.6 (30)	def. by	Adelaide 5.9 (39)	Brighton Homes Arena (crowd: 2,936)	Report; Stats
North Melbourne's loss to Hawthorn was its first since the 2023 AFL Women's Grand Final, ending an AFLW-record 32-match winning streak and 34-match unbeaten streak.

=== Round 7 ===
	Round 7
Thursday, 24 September (7:15 pm)	Geelong 12.10 (82)	def.	Hawthorn 7.4 (46)	GMHBA Stadium (crowd: 3,430)	Report; Stats
Friday, 25 September (12:05 pm)	Essendon 4.11 (35)	def. by	West Coast 6.9 (45)	Windy Hill (crowd: 1,874)	Report; Stats
Friday, 25 September (2:05 pm)	Western Bulldogs 10.2 (62)	def.	Port Adelaide 8.1 (49)	Mission Whitten Oval (crowd: 2,431)	Report; Stats
Friday, 25 September (4:00 pm)	Carlton 11.10 (76)	def.	Richmond 3.3 (21)	Ikon Park (crowd: 4,032)	Report; Stats
Friday, 25 September (7:15 pm)	Melbourne 5.4 (34)	def. by	North Melbourne 10.5 (65)	Ikon Park (crowd: 3,105)	Report; Stats
Sunday, 27 September (1:05 pm)	Collingwood 4.10 (34)	def.	Greater Western Sydney 3.7 (25)	Victoria Park (crowd: 1,571)	Report; Stats
Sunday, 27 September (12:35 pm)	Adelaide 5.5 (35)	def. by	Fremantle 9.6 (60)	Thomas Farms Oval (crowd: 2,312)	Report; Stats
Sunday, 27 September (3:05 pm)	Sydney 5.7 (37)	def.	Brisbane 3.5 (23)	Henson Park (crowd: 2,009)	Report; Stats
Sunday, 27 September (5:05 pm)	Gold Coast 10.9 (69)	def.	St Kilda 6.3 (39)	People First Stadium (crowd: 1,603)	Report; Stats

=== Round 8 ===
	Round 8
Thursday, 1 October (7:15 pm)	Carlton 5.6 (36)	def.	Hawthorn 3.6 (24)	Ikon Park (crowd: 2,037)	Report; Stats
Friday, 2 October (7:15 pm)	Richmond 3.2 (20)	def. by	Geelong 7.12 (54)	Ikon Park (crowd: 1,482)	Report; Stats
Saturday, 3 October (1:05 pm)	Greater Western Sydney 5.5 (35)	def. by	Essendon 6.7 (43)	Henson Park (crowd: 1,044)	Report; Stats
Saturday, 3 October (3:05 pm)	Western Bulldogs 3.13 (31)	def.	St Kilda 0.1 (1)	Mars Stadium (crowd: 1,602)	Report; Stats
Saturday, 3 October (5:05 pm)	Brisbane 3.2 (20)	def. by	Gold Coast 5.10 (40)	Brighton Homes Arena (crowd: 3,968)	Report; Stats
Saturday, 3 October (6:45 pm)	Port Adelaide 5.6 (36)	def.	Adelaide 2.10 (22)	Alberton Oval (crowd: 5,441)	Report; Stats
Sunday, 4 October (1:05 pm)	North Melbourne 10.11 (71)	def.	Sydney 2.4 (16)	Arden Street Oval (crowd: 3,460)	Report; Stats
Sunday, 4 October (3:05 pm)	Collingwood 2.9 (21)	def. by	Melbourne 6.6 (42)	Victoria Park (crowd: 3,316)	Report; Stats
Sunday, 4 October (3:05 pm)	West Coast 5.9 (39)	def.	Fremantle 4.3 (27)	Sullivan Logistics Stadium (crowd: 5,711)	Report; Stats
St Kilda's final score of 0.1 (1) against the Western Bulldogs was the lowest in its history and the equal-lowest in AFLW history; the score was kicked with less than a minute remaining in the match.; Gold Coast's win over Brisbane was its first AFLW QClash win in eight attempts.; The crowd of 5,441 for the Port Adelaide v Adelaide match was the largest crowd for an AFLW match at Alberton Oval.; West Coast's win over Fremantle was its first AFLW Western Derby win in nine attempts.

=== Round 9 ===
	Round 9 (Pride Round week 1)
Friday, 9 October (7:15 pm)	Western Bulldogs 10.5 (65)	def.	Essendon 2.10 (22)	Mission Whitten Oval (crowd: 4,327)	Report
Saturday, 10 October (1:05 pm)	St Kilda 5.9 (39)	def.	Collingwood 5.7 (37)	RSEA Park (crowd: 2,180)	Report
Saturday, 10 October (2:35 pm)	Port Adelaide 3.8 (26)	def.	West Coast 3.4 (22)	Alberton Oval (crowd: 2,626)	Report
Saturday, 10 October (5:05 pm)	Geelong 14.12 (96)	def.	Greater Western Sydney 5.3 (33)	GMHBA Stadium (crowd: 2,924)	Report
Saturday, 10 October (7:15 pm)	Richmond 4.6 (30)	def. by	Adelaide 9.8 (62)	Ikon Park	Report
Saturday, 10 October (7:15 pm)	Gold Coast 9.7 (61)	def.	Melbourne 5.9 (39)	Great Barrier Reef Arena	Report
Sunday, 11 October (12:35 pm)	North Melbourne 9.4 (58)	def.	Fremantle 4.6 (30)	Arden Street Oval (crowd: 2,861)	Report
Sunday, 11 October (1:05 pm)	Hawthorn 9.11 (65)	def.	Brisbane 6.4 (40)	Kennedy Community Centre	Report
Sunday, 11 October (3:05 pm)	Sydney 4.8 (32)	def. by	Carlton 8.11 (59)	Henson Park (crowd: 5,114)	Report

=== Round 10 ===
	Round 10 (Pride Round week 2)
Friday, 16 October (7:15 pm)	Melbourne 14.10 (94)	def.	Richmond 5.2 (32)	Ikon Park (crowd: 1,867)	Report
Saturday, 17 October (12:35 pm)	Adelaide 10.3 (63)	def.	Gold Coast 7.11 (53)	Thomas Farms Oval	Report
Saturday, 17 October (3:05 pm)	Carlton 3.8 (26)	def. by	Western Bulldogs 8.8 (56)	Ikon Park	Report
Saturday, 17 October (4:05 pm)	Brisbane 5.4 (34)	def.	Port Adelaide 2.6 (18)	Brighton Homes Arena (crowd: 2,725)	Report
Saturday, 17 October (4:15 pm)	West Coast 1.7 (13)	def. by	Geelong 8.18 (66)	Sullivan Logistics Stadium (crowd: 2,234)	Report
Sunday, 18 October (12:30 pm)	Collingwood 4.5 (29)	def. by	Sydney 12.8 (80)	Windy Hill (crowd: 2,305)	Report
Sunday, 18 October (2:35 pm)	Greater Western Sydney 7.13 (55)	def.	Hawthorn 7.12 (54)	Henson Park (crowd: 1,875)	Report
Sunday, 18 October (3:05 pm)	Essendon 5.3 (33)	def. by	North Melbourne 12.13 (85)	Windy Hill	Report
Sunday, 18 October (2:05 pm)	Fremantle 7.9 (51)	def.	St Kilda 6.4 (40)	Cockburn ARC	Report

=== Round 11 ===
	Round 11
Friday, 23 October (6:45 pm)	Port Adelaide 8.4 (52)	def.	Collingwood 0.4 (4)	Alberton Oval (crowd: 3,112)	Report
Saturday, 24 October (1:05 pm)	St Kilda 3.5 (23)	def. by	Brisbane 11.9 (75)	RSEA Park (crowd: 1,308)	Report
Saturday, 24 October (3:05 pm)	Geelong 9.10 (64)	def.	Fremantle 5.4 (34)	GMHBA Stadium	Report
Saturday, 24 October (4:05 pm)	Gold Coast 8.6 (54)	def.	Richmond 7.8 (50)	People First Stadium (crowd: 1,954)	Report
Saturday, 24 October (7:15 pm)	Western Bulldogs 2.8 (20)	def. by	Melbourne 5.7 (37)	Mission Whitten Oval (crowd: 2,247)	Report
Sunday, 25 October (12:35 pm)	Sydney 12.6 (78)	def.	West Coast 8.8 (56)	Henson Park (crowd: 3,587)	Report
Sunday, 25 October (1:05 pm)	North Melbourne 5.8 (38)	def.	Adelaide 4.5 (29)	North Hobart Oval	Report
Sunday, 25 October (3:05 pm)	Hawthorn 3.7 (25)	def.	Essendon 3.2 (20)	Kennedy Community Centre (crowd: 1,513)	Report
Sunday, 25 October (5:05 pm)	Carlton 5.8 (38)	def.	Greater Western Sydney 3.5 (23)	Ikon Park	Report

=== Round 12 ===
	Round 12
Friday, 30 October (7:15 pm)	Geelong 13.10 (88)	def.	Western Bulldogs 3.2 (20)	GMHBA Stadium (crowd: 3,126)	Report
Saturday, 31 October (1:05 pm)	St Kilda 7.3 (45)	def. by	Port Adelaide 7.9 (51)	RSEA Park	Report
Saturday, 31 October (3:05 pm)	Richmond 5.3 (33)	def. by	North Melbourne 15.11 (101)	Windy Hill	Report
Saturday, 31 October (4:05 pm)	Brisbane 5.5 (35)	def. by	Carlton 6.4 (40)	Brighton Homes Arena	Report
Saturday, 31 October (4:15 pm)	West Coast 6.3 (39)	def. by	Hawthorn 14.10 (94)	Sullivan Logistics Stadium (crowd: 1,284)	Report
Sunday, 1 November (12:35 pm)	Greater Western Sydney 7.11 (53)	def. by	Gold Coast 9.8 (62)	Henson Park (crowd: 1,632)	Report
Sunday, 1 November (1:05 pm)	Essendon 4.14 (38)	def.	Collingwood 4.7 (31)	Windy Hill (crowd: 2,668)	Report
Sunday, 1 November (2:35 pm)	Adelaide 3.11 (29)	def. by	Melbourne 6.11 (47)	Thomas Farms Oval	Report
Sunday, 1 November (2:05 pm)	Fremantle 5.6 (36)	def. by	Sydney 5.7 (37)	Cockburn ARC (crowd: 2,944)	Report
North Melbourne's win over Richmond meant they became the first club in the league to record three successive minor premierships.

== Ladder ==
Pos	Team	Pld	W	L	D	PF	PA	PP	Pts	Qualification
1	North Melbourne	12	11	1	0	789	320	246.6	44	Finals series
2	Geelong	12	11	1	0	871	484	180.0	44	Finals series
3	Melbourne	12	10	2	0	715	405	176.5	40	Finals series
4	Carlton	12	9	3	0	554	416	133.2	36	Finals series
5	Gold Coast	12	9	3	0	609	458	133.0	36	Finals series
6	Sydney	12	9	3	0	606	527	115.0	36	Finals series
7	Western Bulldogs	12	8	4	0	495	448	110.5	32	Finals series
8	Hawthorn	12	7	5	0	580	513	113.1	28	Finals series
9	Port Adelaide	12	6	6	0	422	454	93.0	24	
10	Fremantle	12	5	7	0	477	489	97.5	20	
11	Adelaide	12	5	7	0	528	544	97.1	20	
12	Brisbane	12	4	8	0	504	502	100.4	16	
13	West Coast	12	4	8	0	459	656	70.0	16	
14	Richmond	12	4	8	0	468	714	65.5	16	
15	Greater Western Sydney	12	2	10	0	479	691	69.3	8	
16	Essendon	12	2	10	0	386	646	59.8	8	
17	Collingwood	12	1	11	0	350	646	54.2	4	
18	St Kilda	12	1	11	0	332	711	46.7	4	

Source: afl.com.au
Rules for classification: 1) points; 2) percentage; 3) number of points for

== Progression by round ==
Updated to the end of round 8.

4	Finished the round in first place	0	Finished the round in last place
4	Finished the round inside the top eight		
4_{1}	Subscript indicates the ladder position at the end of the round		

Team	1	2	3	4	5	6	7	8	9	10	11	12
North Melbourne	4_{1}	8_{1}	12_{1}	16_{1}	20_{1}	20_{2}	24_{1}	28_{1}	32_{1}	36_{1}	40_{1}	44_{1}
Geelong	0_{18}	4_{9}	8_{6}	12_{4}	16_{5}	20_{3}	24_{3}	28_{3}	32_{2}	36_{2}	40 _{2}	44_{2}
Melbourne	4_{7}	8_{2}	12_{2}	16_{2}	20_{2}	24_{1}	24_{2}	28_{2}	28_{3}	32_{3}	36_{3}	40_{3}
Carlton	4_{5}	8_{3}	12_{3}	16_{3}	16_{3}	16_{6}	20_{6}	24_{5}	28_{5}	28_{6}	32_{5}	36_{4}
Gold Coast	0_{17}	4_{8}	4_{10}	8_{11}	12_{6}	16_{5}	20_{5}	24_{4}	28_{4}	28_{5}	32_{4}	36_{5}
Sydney	4_{9}	8_{5}	12_{4}	12_{5}	16_{4}	20_{4}	24_{4}	24_{7}	24_{7}	28_{7}	32_{7}	36_{6}
Western Bulldogs	4_{2}	8_{4}	8_{9}	12_{6}	12_{9}	16_{8}	20_{7}	24_{6}	28_{6}	32_{4}	32_{6}	32_{7}
Hawthorn	0_{12}	4_{7}	8_{5}	8_{8}	12_{8}	16_{7}	16_{9}	16_{9}	20_{8}	20_{10}	24_{8}	28_{8}
Port Adelaide	4_{4}	4_{12}	8_{8}	8_{12}	8_{13}	8_{14}	8_{14}	12_{13}	16_{12}	16_{11}	20_{11}	24_{9}
Fremantle	0_{15}	4_{11}	4_{11}	8_{7}	12_{7}	12_{10}	16_{8}	16_{8}	16_{9}	20_{8}	20_{10}	20_{10}
Adelaide	0_{10}	0_{14}	4_{13}	8_{10}	8_{12}	12_{11}	12_{11}	12_{12}	16_{10}	20_{9}	20_{9}	20_{11}
Brisbane	4_{3}	4_{6}	4_{12}	8_{9}	8_{11}	8_{12}	8_{13}	8_{14}	8_{14}	12_{14}	16_{12}	16_{12}
West Coast	0_{11}	0_{15}	0_{15}	0_{15}	4_{14}	8_{13}	12_{12}	16_{10}	16_{11}	16_{12}	16_{13}	16_{13}
Richmond	4_{6}	4_{10}	8_{7}	8_{13}	12_{10}	16_{9}	16_{10}	16_{11}	16_{13}	16_{13}	16_{14}	16_{14}
Greater Western Sydney	4_{8}	4_{13}	4_{14}	4_{14}	4_{15}	4_{15}	4_{15}	4_{15}	4_{15}	8_{15}	8_{15}	8_{15}
Essendon	0_{16}	0_{17}	0_{16}	0_{16}	0_{16}	0_{16}	0_{17}	4_{16}	4_{17}	4_{17}	4_{16}	8_{16}
Collingwood	0_{13}	0_{16}	0_{17}	0_{17}	0_{17}	0_{17}	4_{16}	4_{17}	4_{16}	4_{16}	4_{17}	4_{17}
St Kilda	0_{14}	0_{18}	0_{18}	0_{18}	0_{18}	0_{18}	0_{18}	0_{18}	4_{18}	4_{18}	4_{18}	4_{18}

Source: Australian Football

== Home match attendance ==
Updated to Melbourne v North Melbourne (round 7).

The following table includes all home match attendance figures from the home-and-away season.

Team	Hosted	Total	Highest	Lowest	Average		
Team	Hosted	Total	Highest	Lowest	2025	2026	Change
Adelaide	3	8,964	3,640	2,560	2,805	2,988	
Brisbane	3	8,574	2,983	2,655	3,629	2,858	
Carlton	3	8,023	4,032	1,979	3,144	2,674	
Collingwood	3	6,261	2,604	1,616	2,530	2,087	
Essendon	4	9,712	4,017	1,781	2,545	2,428	
Fremantle	4	8,752	2,752	1,628	2,239	2,188	
Geelong	3	21,558	15,266	2,862	2,609	7,186	
Gold Coast	3	4,480	1,838	1,170	1,281	1,493	
Greater Western Sydney	3	4,014	2,299	1,902	1,624	2,104	
Hawthorn	4	10,784	3,424	2,118	2,163	2,696	
Melbourne	5	9,918	3,105	1,505	2,037	1,984	
North Melbourne	3	19,635	14,573	1,014	2,081	6,545	
Port Adelaide	3	8,234	3,247	2,281	2,584	2,745	
Richmond	3	5,500	2,146	1,423	2,492	1,833	
St Kilda	3	23,881	20,455	1,594	2,101	7,960	
Sydney	3	26,721	16,672	2,709	4,498	8,907	
West Coast	3	4,340	1,511	1,332	1,919	1,447	
Western Bulldogs	3	6,784	2,431	2,142	2,400	2,261	
Total/overall	59	198,434	20,455	1,014	2,482	3,363	

Source: Australian Football

== Finals series ==
All starting times are local time. Source: afl.com.au

=== Finals week 1 ===
Second qualifying final
Saturday, 7 November (1:05 pm)	Geelong 8.4 (52)	def. by	Melbourne 8.8 (56)	Ikon Park (crowd: 4,743)	Report
1.1 (7); 5.2 (32); 8.2 (50); 8.4 (52)	Q1; Q2; Q3; Q4	0.4 (4); 1.4 (10); 5.8 (38); 8.8 (56)
Parry 2, Moloney 2 Webster, Scheer, McDonald, Bowen 1	Goals	Bannan 2 McNamara, O'Hehir, Heath-Barker, Hanks, Hore, Paxman 1
Prespakis, Webster, Morrison, McDonald, Bowen, Gunjaca	Best	Purcell, Hanks, McNamara, Chaplin, Hore, Harris

First qualifying final
Saturday, 7 November (4:05 pm)	North Melbourne 7.7 (49)	def.	Carlton 1.7 (13)	Ikon Park (crowd: 5,028)	Report
0.0 (0); 4.2 (26); 5.5 (35); 7.7 (49)	Q1; Q2; Q3; Q4	0.2 (2); 0.3 (3); 0.5 (5); 1.8 (14)
Shierlaw, Wall, Garner, Sheerin, Bruton, Gatt 1	Goals	S.McKay 1
Garner, Riddell, Sheerin, O’Shea, Eddey	Best	Cordner, Hendrie, Hill, A.McKay, Fitzpatrick

Second elimination final
Sunday, 8 November (1:05 pm)	Sydney 7.4 (46)	def.	Western Bulldogs 2.5 (17)	Henson Park (crowd: 4,325)	Report
4.1 (25); 4.1 (25); 6.4 (40); 7.4 (46)	Q1; Q2; Q3; Q4	0.1 (1); 1.2 (8); 2.3 (15); 2.5 (17)
Martin 2 McEvoy, Kennedy, C.Hamilton, Molloy, Smith 1	Goals	Blackburn, Hartwig 1
Kennedy, Molloy, Quinn, McEvoy, Gardiner, Martin	Best	Edmonds, Blackburn, Woodley, Cann, Hartwig, Wilcox

First elimination final
Sunday, 8 November (2:05 pm)	Gold Coast 6.3 (39)	def. by	Hawthorn 8.9 (57)	People First Stadium (crowd: 3,675)	Report
1.1 (7); 4.1 (25); 4.2 (26); 6.3 (39)	Q1; Q2; Q3; Q4	2.1 (13); 3.4 (22); 6.5 (41); 8.9 (57)
D.Davies 2 Harris, Usher, Nurse, Hatchard 1	Goals	Stone 2 Stockwell, Dupuy, McDonagh, West, Antony, Williamson 1
D.Davies, McLaughlin, G.Davies, Nurse, Parker	Best	Stone, Richardson, Sherriff, West, McLaughlin, Wales

=== Finals week 2 ===
Second semi-final
Saturday, 14 November (4:05 pm)	Geelong 7.5 (47)	def. by	Sydney 8.2 (50)	GMHBA Stadium (crowd: 5,656)	Report
1.0 (6); 3.2 (20); 5.4 (34); 7.5 (47)	Q1; Q2; Q3; Q4	2.1 (13); 4.1 (25); 7.2 (44); 8.2 (50)
Scheer 3 Parry, Moloney, Mason, Bowen 1	Goals	Molloy 3 C.Hamilton 2 Cooper, Pullar, Quinn 1
Bowen, Prespakis, Morrison, Emonson, Webster, Parry	Best	Molloy, Fish, Quinn, Kennedy, Ham, Gardiner

First semi-final
Saturday, 14 November (7:15 pm)	Carlton 6.7 (43)	def.	Hawthorn 6.2 (38)	Ikon Park (crowd: 4,701)	Report
1.2 (8); 3.3 (21); 4.6 (30); 6.7 (43)	Q1; Q2; Q3; Q4	3.1 (19); 4.1 (25); 4.2 (26); 6.2 (38)
Vescio 2 Bohanna, Keck, Goss, S.McKay 1	Goals	Dupuy 2, Eardley 2 McDonagh, Antony 1
Cordner, A.McKay, Vescio, Hill, Fitzpatrick	Best	West, Wales, Dupuy, Coyne

=== Finals week 3 ===
First preliminary final
Saturday, 21 November (1:05 pm)	North Melbourne 13.5 (83)	def.	Sydney 8.3 (51)	Ikon Park (crowd: 7,241)	Report
4.2 (26); 9.2 (56); 10.2 (62); 13.5 (83)	Q1; Q2; Q3; Q4	2.1 (13); 6.2 (38); 7.2 (44); 8.3 (51)

Second preliminary final
Saturday, 21 November (4:05 pm)	Melbourne 10.15 (75)	def.	Carlton 6.9 (45)	Ikon Park (crowd: 8,037)	Report
1.3 (9); 4.6 (30); 8.9 (57); 10.15 (75)	Q1; Q2; Q3; Q4	0.3 (3); 3.4 (22); 4.7 (31); 6.9 (45)

=== Grand Final ===
Grand Final
Friday, 27 November (7:45 pm)	North Melbourne	v	Melbourne	Ikon Park
Q1; Q2; Q3; Q4	Best on ground:

== Win–loss table ==
Updated to the end of Semi Finals.

The following table can be sorted from biggest winning margin to biggest losing margin for each round. If two or more matches in a round are decided by the same margin, these margins are sorted by percentage (i.e. the lowest-scoring winning team is ranked highest and the lowest-scoring losing team is ranked lowest). Home matches are in bold, and opponents are listed above the margins.

+	Win	Qualified for finals
−	Loss	Eliminated

Team	Home-and-away season												Ladder	Finals series			
Team	1	2	3	4	5	6	7	8	9	10	11	12	Ladder	F1	F2	F3	GF
Adelaide	**SYD** **–8**	CAR –27	**WC** **+17**	HAW +28	**GEE** **–11**	BRI +9	**FRE** **–25**	PA –14	RIC +32	**GC** **+10**	NM -9	**MEL** **-18**	11 (5–7–0)				
Brisbane	ESS +48	**NM** **–11**	MEL –56	**GWS** **+31**	WC –5	**ADE** **–9**	SYD –14	**GC** **–20**	HAW -27	**PA** **+16**	STK +52	**CAR** **-5**	12 (4–8–0)				
Carlton	STK +26	**ADE** **+27**	FRE +6	**COL** **+39**	NM –10	MEL –34	**RIC** **+55**	**HAW** **+12**	SYD +27	**WB** **-30**	**GWS** **+15**	BRI +5	4 (9–3–0)	NM -36	**HAW** **+5**	MEL	
Collingwood	RIC –18	**FRE** **–20**	**HAW** **–28**	CAR –39	GC –30	**GEE** **–41**	**GWS** **+9**	**MEL** **–21**	STK -2	**SYD** **-51**	PA -48	ESS -7	17 (1–11–0)				
Essendon	**BRI** **–48**	SYD –24	**RIC** **–5**	GEE –32	FRE –15	**GC** **–41**	**WC** **–10**	GWS +8	WB -43	**NM** **-52**	HAW -5	**COL** **+7**	16 (2–10–0)				
Fremantle	**PA** **–21**	COL +20	**CAR** **–6**	RIC +25	**ESS** **+15**	**WB** **–10**	**ADE** **+25**	WC –12	NM -28	**STK** **+11**	GEE -30	**SYD** **-1**	10 (5–7–0)				
Geelong	NM –73	**STK** **+85**	GC +7	**ESS** **+32**	ADE +11	COL +41	**HAW** **+36**	RIC +34	**GWS** **+63**	WC +53	**FRE** **+30**	**WB** **+68**	2 (11–1–0)	**MEL** **-4**	**SYD** **-3**		
Gold Coast	**WB** **–26**	WC +35	**GEE** **–7**	PA +3	**COL** **+30**	ESS +41	**STK** **+30**	BRI +20	**MEL** **+22**	ADE -10	**RIC** **+4**	GWS +9	5 (9–3–0)	**HAW** **-18**			
Greater Western Sydney	**WC** **+12**	MEL –48	**PA** **–4**	BRI –31	SYD –31	**RIC** **–7**	COL –9	**ESS** **–8**	GEE -63	**HAW** **+1**	CAR -15	**GC** **-9**	15 (2–10–0)				
Hawthorn	**MEL** **–19**	PA +32	COL +28	**ADE** **–28**	**WB** **+11**	**NM** **+7**	GEE –36	CAR –12	**BRI** **+25**	GWS -1	**ESS** **+5**	WC +55	8 (7–5–0)	GC +18	CAR -5		
Melbourne	HAW +19	**GWS** **+48**	**BRI** **+56**	WC +37	**PA** **+51**	**CAR** **+34**	**NM** **–31**	COL +21	GC -22	**RIC** **+62**	WB +17	ADE +18	3 (10–2–0)	Gee +4	X	**CAR**	
North Melbourne	**GEE** **+73**	BRI +11	**WB** **+47**	STK +92	**CAR** **+10**	HAW –7	MEL +31	**SYD** **+55**	**FRE** **+28**	ESS +52	**ADE** **+9**	RIC +68	1 (11–1–0)	**CAR** **+36**	X	**SYD**	
Port Adelaide	FRE +21	**HAW** **–32**	GWS +4	**GC** **–3**	MEL –51	**SYD** **–14**	WB –13	**ADE** **+14**	**WC** **+4**	BRI -16	**COL** **+48**	STK +6	9 (6–6–0)				
Richmond	**COL** **+18**	WB –11	ESS +5	**FRE** **–25**	**STK** **+15**	GWS +7	CAR –55	**GEE** **–34**	**ADE** **-32**	MEL -62	GC -4	**NM** **--68**	14 (4–8–0)				
St Kilda	**CAR** **–26**	GEE –85	SYD –23	**NM** **–92**	RIC –15	**WC** **–11**	GC –30	WB –30	**COL** **+2**	FRE -11	**BRI** **-52**	**PA** **-6**	18 (1–11–0)				
Sydney	ADE +8	**ESS** **+24**	**STK** **+23**	WB –27	**GWS** **+31**	PA +14	**BRI** **+14**	NM –55	**CAR** **-27**	COL +51	**WC** **+22**	FRE +1	6 (9–3–0)	**WB** **+29**	GEE +3	NM	
West Coast	GWS –12	**GC** **–35**	ADE –17	**MEL** **–37**	**BRI** **+5**	STK +11	ESS +10	**FRE** **+12**	PA -4	**GEE** **-53**	SYD -22	**HAW** **-55**	13 (4–8–0)				
Western Bulldogs	GC +26	**RIC** **+11**	NM –47	**SYD** **+27**	HAW –11	FRE +10	**PA** **+13**	**STK** **+30**	**ESS** **+43**	CAR +30	**MEL** **-17**	GEE -68	7 (8–4–0)	SYD -29			

Source: Australian Football

== Coach departures ==
Outgoing coach	Club	Manner of departure	Date of departure	Caretaker coach	Incoming coach	Date of appointment
Nick Dal Santo	St Kilda	Resigned mid-season	9 October 2026	Matt Brewer		
Natalie Wood	Essendon	Dismissed mid-season, coached out season	25 October 2026	—		

== Leading goalkickers ==
Updated to the end of round 8.

1	Led the goalkicking at the end of the round
1_{1}	Subscript indicates the player's goal tally to that point of the season
–	Did not play during that round

#	Player	Team	Home-and-away season (AFL Women's leading goalkicker)												Finals series				Total	Games	Average
#	Player	Team	1	2	3	4	5	6	7	8	9	10	11	12	F1	F2	F3	GF	Total	Games	Average
1	Áine McDonagh	Hawthorn	3_{3}	3_{6}	3_{9}	3_{12}	4_{16}	0_{16}	2_{18}	0_{18}									18	8	2.25
1	Chloe Scheer	Geelong	0_{0}	2_{2}	3_{5}	2_{7}	2_{9}	4_{13}	2_{15}	3_{18}									18	8	2.25
3	Mia Austin	Melbourne	4_{4}	1_{5}	2_{7}	–_{7}	2_{9}	1_{10}	3_{13}	3_{16}									16	7	2.29
3	Jackie Parry	Geelong	1_{1}	6_{7}	0_{7}	2_{9}	2_{11}	1_{12}	3_{15}	1_{16}									16	8	2.00
3	Tahlia Randall	North Melbourne	3_{3}	2_{5}	1_{6}	5_{11}	1_{12}	0_{12}	1_{13}	3_{16}									16	8	2.00
6	Chloe Molloy	Sydney	1_{1}	1_{2}	1_{3}	3_{6}	4_{10}	3_{13}	0_{13}	0_{13}									13	8	1.63
6	Olivia Wolmarans	Richmond	1_{1}	3_{4}	0_{4}	2_{6}	1_{7}	3_{10}	2_{12}	1_{13}									13	8	1.63
8	Erone Fitzpatrick	Carlton	0_{0}	0_{0}	2_{2}	2_{4}	1_{5}	1_{6}	1_{9}	2_{11}									11	8	1.38
8	Amy Franklin	West Coast	1_{1}	3_{4}	1_{5}	0_{5}	2_{7}	2_{9}	1_{10}	1_{11}									11	8	1.38
8	Aishling Moloney	Geelong	0_{0}	1_{1}	1_{2}	4_{6}	1_{7}	3_{10}	1_{11}	0_{11}									11	8	1.38

Source: Australian Football

== Season notes ==
- For the first time in AFL Women's history, neither Adelaide or Brisbane will feature in the Grand Final, after both sides finished outside of the top eight. It is also the third time Brisbane will not feature in the Grand Final.

== See also ==
- 2026 AFL season
