= 2025 AFL Women's best and fairest =

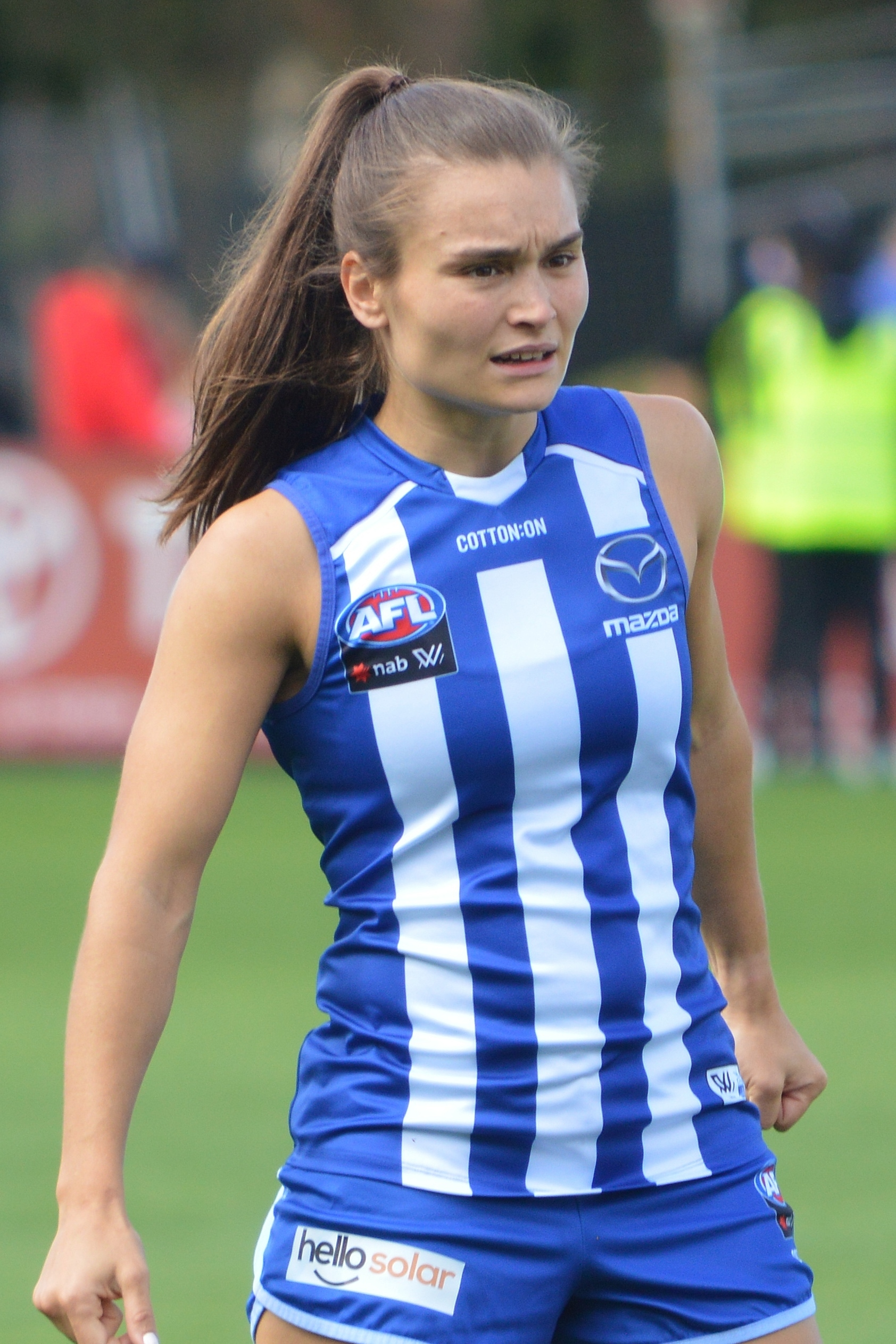
- Ash Riddell, 2025 winner
- Date: 24 November 2025
- Venue: Crown Melbourne
- Hosted by: Brihony Dawson; Lauren Wood
- Winner: Ash Riddell (North Melbourne)

Television/radio coverage
- Network: Fox Footy

The 2025 AFL Women's best and fairest award was presented to the player adjudged the best and fairest player during the 2025 AFL Women's season. North Melbourne's Ash Riddell won the award with 23 votes.

== Voting procedure ==
The three field umpires confer after each match and award three votes, two votes and one vote to the players they regard as the best, second-best and third-best in the match, respectively; the votes are kept secret until the awards night, and are read and tallied on the evening.

== Leading votegetters ==
2025 AFL Women's best and fairest top 10
Placing	Player	Votes
1	Ash Riddell (North Melbourne)	23
2	Georgie Prespakis (Geelong)	20
3	Tyla Hanks (Melbourne)	18
4	Ella Roberts (West Coast)	17
5	Laura Gardiner (Sydney)	15
5	Jasmine Garner (North Melbourne)	15
7	Kiara Bowers (Fremantle)	13
7	Georgia Nanscawen (Essendon)	13
9	Matilda Scholz (Port Adelaide)	12
10	Abbey Dowrick (Port Adelaide)	11
10	Kate Hore (Melbourne)	11
10	Isabelle Pritchard (Western Bulldogs)	11
10	Mim Strom (Fremantle)	11

== Votes by club ==
2025 AFL Women's best and fairest breakdown of votes by club
Adelaide	Brisbane	Carlton	Collingwood	Essendon	Fremantle
Anne Hatchard – 8 Maddi Newman – 8 Ebony Marinoff – 6 Chelsea Randall – 6 Sarah Goodwin – 3 Jess Allan – 1 Caitlin Gould – 1 Niamh Kelly – 1	Belle Dawes – 10; Sophie Conway – 8 Courtney Hodder – 8 Jade Ellenger – 7 Cathy Svarc – 6 Ally Anderson – 3 Orla O'Dwyer – 3 Ruby Svarc – 3 Ellie Hampson – 2 Charlotte Mullins – 1 Taylor Smith – 1	Mimi Hill – 9 Breann Harrington – 7 Abbie McKay – 6 Erone Fitzpatrick – 4 Tara Bohanna – 3 Harriet Cordner – 3 Dayna Finn – 2 Amelia Velardo – 2 Jess Good – 1 Sophie McKay – 1 Keeley Sherar – 1	Brittany Bonnici – 10; Ash Centra – 4 Ruby Schleicher – 4 Imogen Barnett – 3 Sarah Rowe – 3 Lucy Cronin – 1 Nell Morris-Dalton – 1	Georgia Nanscawen – 13; Steph Cain – 3 Maddy Prespakis – 3 Amy Gaylor – 2 Maggie MacLachlan – 2 Georgia Gee – 1	Kiara Bowers – 13; Mim Strom – 11; Aisling McCarthy – 5 Gabby Newton – 3 Emma O'Driscoll – 3 Ange Stannett – 3
Total – 34	Total – 52	Total – 39	Total – 26	Total – 24	Total – 38
Geelong	Gold Coast	Greater Western Sydney	Hawthorn	Melbourne	North Melbourne
Georgie Prespakis – 20; Nina Morrison – 7 Aishling Moloney – 6 Mikayla Bowen – 3 Julia Crockett-Grills – 2 Amy McDonald – 2 Chantal Mason – 1	Niamh McLaughlin – 10; Charlie Rowbottom – 10; Lucy Single – 2	Georgia Garnett – 3 Zarlie Goldsworthy – 3 Rebecca Beeson – 2 Tarni Evans – 2 Taylah Levy – 2 Eilish O'Dowd – 2 Brodee Mowbray – 1 Emily Pease – 1 Kaitlyn Srhoj – 1	Emily Bates – 10; Eliza West – 9 Jasmine Fleming – 8 Áine McDonagh – 7 Tilly Lucas-Rodd – 3 Casey Sherriff – 2 Emily Everist – 1 Jenna Richardson – 1	Tyla Hanks – 18; Kate Hore – 11; Tayla Harris – 8 Eden Zanker – 6 Maeve Chaplin – 3 Eliza McNamara – 2 Paxy Paxman – 2 Lauren Pearce – 2 Shelley Heath – 1 Alyssia Pisano – 1	Ash Riddell – 23; Jasmine Garner – 15; Ruby Tripodi – 6 Blaithin Bogue – 4 Tess Craven – 4 Emma Kearney – 4 Erika O'Shea – 4 Bella Eddey – 2 Tahlia Randall – 2 Libby Birch – 1 Emma King – 1 Kate Shierlaw – 1
Total – 41	Total – 22	Total – 17	Total – 41	Total – 54	Total – 67
Port Adelaide	Richmond	St Kilda	Sydney	West Coast	Western Bulldogs
Matilda Scholz – 12; Abbey Dowrick – 11; Indy Tahau – 6 Shineah Goody – 3 Gemma Houghton – 3 Ella Boag – 2 Maria Moloney – 1	Monique Conti – 9 Ellie McKenzie – 7 Katie Brennan – 3 Sarah Hosking – 1	Tyanna Smith – 7 Jesse Wardlaw – 6 Amber Clarke – 5 Jaimee Lambert – 4 Georgia Patrikios – 2 Paige Trudgeon – 2 Serene Watson – 2	Laura Gardiner – 15; Ally Morphett – 8 Montana Ham – 7 Chloe Molloy – 6 Zippy Fish – 4 Sofia Hurley – 3	Ella Roberts – 17; Bella Lewis – 8 Lucia Painter – 2 Courtney Rowley – 2 Lauren Wakfer – 2 Kellie Gibson – 1	Isabelle Pritchard – 11; Ellie Blackburn – 5 Jess Fitzgerald – 4 Deanna Berry – 3 Alice Edmonds – 3 Dominique Carruthers – 2 Isabella Grant – 2 Rylie Wilcox – 2 Sarah Hartwig – 1
Total – 38	Total – 20	Total – 28	Total – 42	Total – 32	Total – 33
