= 2021 AFL Women's Rising Star =

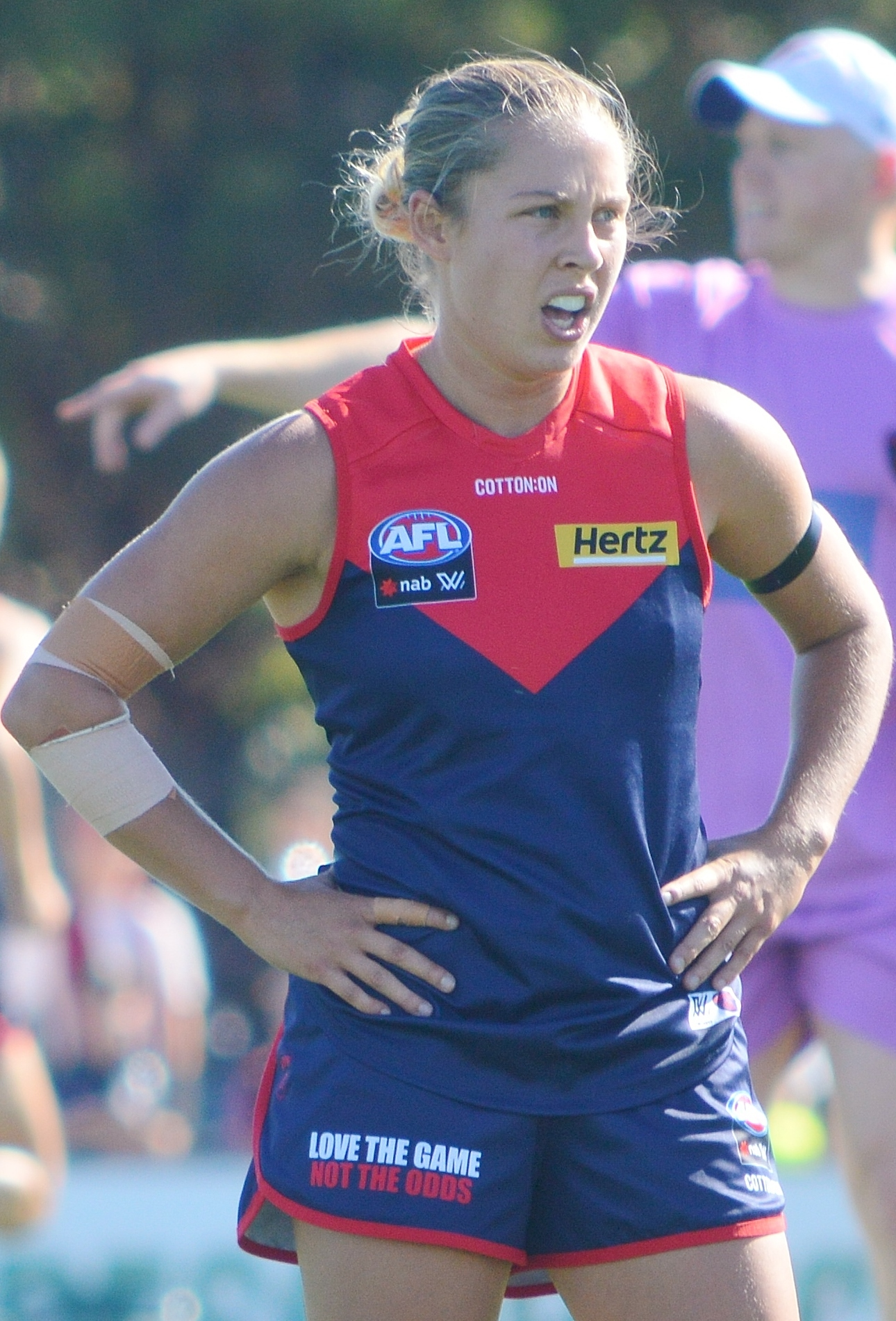
- Tyla Hanks, 2021 winner
- Sponsored by: National Australia Bank
- Date: 20 April 2021
- Venue: 2021 W Awards venues: Adelaide Oval; Crown Melbourne; The Gabba; Perth Stadium; Sydney Cricket Ground
- Hosted by: Sarah Jones
- Winner: Tyla Hanks (Melbourne)

Television/radio coverage
- Network: Fox Footy

The 2021 NAB AFL Women's Rising Star award was presented to the player adjudged the best young player during the 2021 AFL Women's season. Tyla Hanks of the Melbourne Football Club won the award with 48 votes.

== Eligibility ==
Every round, two nominations will be given to standout young players who performed well during that particular round. To be eligible for nomination, players must have been under 21 years of age on 1 January 2021 and not suspended during the season.

== Nominations ==
Table of nominees
Round	Player	Club	Ref.
1	Belle Dawes	Brisbane	
1	Tarni White	St Kilda	
2	Jess Fitzgerald	Western Bulldogs	
2	Tyla Hanks	Melbourne	
3	Nat Grider	Brisbane	
3	Abbie McKay	Carlton	
4	Tyanna Smith	St Kilda	
4	Rebecca Webster	Geelong	
5	Mikayla Bowen	West Coast	
5	Ellie McKenzie	Richmond	
6	Daisy Bateman	North Melbourne	
6	Tarni Brown	Collingwood	
7	Lauren Bella	Gold Coast	
7	Eliza McNamara	Melbourne	
8	Courtney Hodder	Brisbane	
8	Isabella Lewis	West Coast	
9	Eleanor Brown	Western Bulldogs	
9	Tahlia Hickie	Brisbane	

Table of nominations by club
Number	Club	Player	Nom.
4	Brisbane	Belle Dawes	1
4	Brisbane	Nat Grider	3
4	Brisbane	Courtney Hodder	8
4	Brisbane	Tahlia Hickie	9
2	Melbourne	Tyla Hanks	2
2	Melbourne	Eliza McNamara	7
2	St Kilda	Tarni White	1
2	St Kilda	Tyanna Smith	4
2	West Coast	Mikayla Bowen	5
2	West Coast	Isabella Lewis	8
2	Western Bulldogs	Jess Fitzgerald	2
2	Western Bulldogs	Eleanor Brown	9
1	Carlton	Abbie McKay	3
1	Collingwood	Tarni Brown	6
1	Geelong	Rebecca Webster	4
1	Gold Coast	Lauren Bella	7
1	North Melbourne	Daisy Bateman	6
1	Richmond	Ellie McKenzie	5

== Final voting ==
Table of votes
Placing	Player	Club	Nom.	Votes
1	Tyla Hanks	Melbourne	2	48
2	Ellie McKenzie	Richmond	5	32
3	Mikayla Bowen	West Coast	5	22
4	Tyanna Smith	St Kilda	4	19
5	Nat Grider	Brisbane	3	10
