= North Melbourne Club Champion (AFL Women's) =

North Melbourne best and fairest
- Awarded for: The best and fairest player of the North Melbourne Football Club in the AFL Women's
- Country: Australia
- Presented by: North Melbourne Football Club
- First award: 2019
- Currently held by: Ash Riddell

In the AFL Women's (AFLW), the North Melbourne best and fairest award is awarded to the best and fairest player at the North Melbourne Football Club during the home-and-away season. The award has been awarded annually since the club's inaugural season in the competition in 2019, and Jenna Bruton was the inaugural winner of the award.

== Recipients ==
**Bold**	Denotes current player
	Player won AFL Women's best and fairest in same season

Season	Recipient(s)	Ref.
2019	**Jenna Bruton**	
2020	**Jasmine Garner**	
2021	**Jasmine Garner** (2)	
2022 (S6)	**Ash Riddell**	
2022 (S7)	**Jasmine Garner** (3)	
2023	**Jasmine Garner** (4)	
2024	**Jasmine Garner** (5)	
2025	**Ash Riddell** (2)	

== See also ==
- Syd Barker Medal (list of North Melbourne Football Club best and fairest winners in the Australian Football League)
