= Tahlia Hickie =

Australian rules footballer

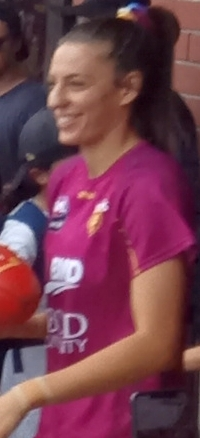

Personal information
- Born: 22 July 2000 (age 26)
- Original team: Coorparoo (QAFLW)
- Draft: No. 28, 2019 AFL Women's draft
- Debut: Semi-final, 2020, Brisbane vs. Carlton, at Princes Park
- Height: 182 cm (6 ft 0 in)
- Position: Ruck/forward

Club information
- Current club: Brisbane
- Number: 2

Playing career^{1}
Years	Club	Games (Goals)
2020–	Brisbane	50 (2)
- ^{1} Playing statistics correct to the end of the 2023 season.

Career highlights
- AFL Women's Rising Star nominee: 2021; AFLW premiership player: 2021, 2023

Tahlia Hickie (born 22 July 2000) is an Australian rules footballer playing for Brisbane in the AFL Women's competition (AFLW). She was playing for Coorparoo in the AFL Queensland Women's League when she was drafted by Brisbane with the 28th pick in the 2019 AFL Women's draft, having missed the 2018 draft due to injury.

Hickie made her debut in the Lions' semi-final against Carlton at Princes Park on 22 March 2020. Hickie signed on with Brisbane for one more year on 15 June 2021.

== Honours and achievements ==
Team

- McClelland Trophy/Club Championship: 2025

Individual

- AFL Women's Rising Star nominee: 2021
