= Tarni White =

Australian rules footballer

Personal information
- Full name: Tarni White
- Born: 31 January 2001 (age 25)
- Original team: Coorparoo (QAFLW)
- Draft: No. 30, 2019 national draft
- Debut: Round 1, 2020, St Kilda vs. Western Bulldogs, at RSEA Park
- Height: 166 cm (5 ft 5 in)
- Position: Utility

Club information
- Current club: Collingwood
- Number: 29

Playing career^{1}
Years	Club	Games (Goals)
2020–2022 (S7)	St Kilda	32 (3)
2023–	Collingwood	42 (6)
Total		74 (9)
- ^{1} Playing statistics correct to the end of the 2026 season.

Tarni White (born 31 January 2001) is an Australian rules footballer who plays for Collingwood in the AFL Women's (AFLW). She has previously played for St Kilda in the AFLW.

== State football ==
Originally from Brisbane's bayside suburb of Capalaba, White began her football journey after switching from rugby to Australian rules football at the age of nine. She joined the Wynnum Football Club, where she stood out as the only female player at the club for six consecutive seasons, often playing above her age group. She played more than 100 games for Wynnum and her impact has been recognized by the club, which established the Tarni White Rising Star Award to honour the best first-year player at Wynnum, regardless of age or gender. Through word of mouth, she joined the Coorparoo Football Club, where she continued her development in women's football, frequently playing two matches per weekend, one for Wynnum and one for Coorparoo. White played for Queensland as a 17-year-old with standout performances, but tore her anterior cruciate ligament and missed 16 months of footy.

== AFLW career ==
=== St Kilda ===
White moved to Melbourne when selected by St Kilda in the 2019 national draft, after opting for the Victorian draft pool over her native Queensland. She made her AFLW debut in round 1 of the 2020 AFL Women's season. In February 2021, White was nominated for the 2021 AFL Women's Rising Star award. In March 2022, she was selected for the 22under22 squad.

In June 2021, it was revealed White had signed on with St Kilda for two more seasons. In each of her four seasons at St Kilda, White finished placed in the top 10 of the club's best and fairest count.

=== Collingwood ===
In March 2023, White was traded to Collingwood. In her debut season at the club, she played all 10 games and was a significant contributor, leading to her signing a three-year contract extension in November 2023.

== Statistics ==
Statistics are correct to the end of the 2025 season.

Legend
G	Goals	K	Kicks	D	Disposals	T	Tackles
B	Behinds	H	Handballs	M	Marks

Season	Team	No.	Games	Totals							Averages (per game)							Votes
Season	Team	No.	Games	G	B	K	H	D	M	T	G	B	K	H	D	M	T	Votes
2020	St Kilda	29	4	0	0	28	5	33	13	7	0.0	0.0	7.0	1.3	8.3	3.3	1.8	0
2021	St Kilda	29	9	0	0	63	35	98	29	28	0.0	0.0	7.0	3.9	10.9	3.2	3.1	1
2022 (S6)	St Kilda	29	9	2	4	76	38	114	27	59	0.2	0.4	8.4	4.2	12.7	3.0	6.6	0
2022 (S7)	St Kilda	9	10	1	3	88	30	118	17	66	0.1	0.3	8.8	3.0	11.8	1.7	6.6	2
2023	Collingwood	29	10	2	2	66	29	95	25	45	0.2	0.2	6.6	2.9	9.5	2.5	4.5	0
2024	Collingwood	29	8	2	0	58	26	84	19	52	0.3	0.0	7.3	3.3	10.5	2.4	6.5	0
2025	Collingwood	29	12	0	1	161	62	223	61	46	0.0	0.1	13.4	5.2	18.6	5.1	3.8	0
Career			62	7	10	540	225	765	191	303	0.1	0.2	8.7	3.6	12.3	3.1	4.9	3
