= Ash Riddell =

Australian rules footballer

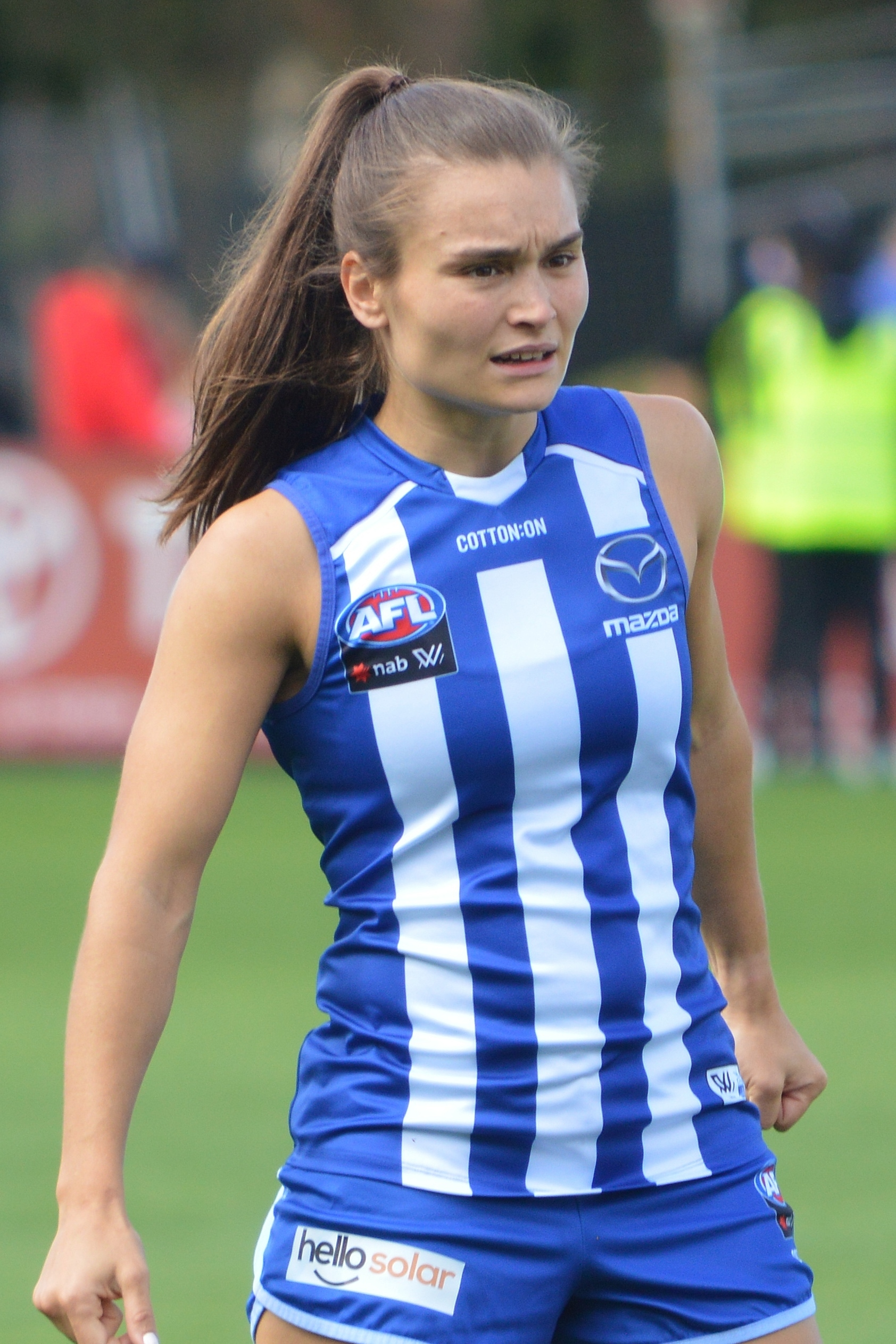
- Riddell playing for North Melbourne in 2021

Personal information
- Full name: Ashleigh Riddell
- Born: 7 March 1996 (age 30)
- Original team: Melbourne University (VFLW)
- Draft: 2018 free agent signing
- Debut: Round 1, 2019, North Melbourne vs. Carlton, at North Hobart Oval
- Height: 158 cm (5 ft 2 in)
- Position: Midfielder

Club information
- Current club: North Melbourne
- Number: 7

Playing career^{1}
Years	Club	Games (Goals)
2019–	North Melbourne	85 (19)
- ^{1} Playing statistics correct to the end of the 2025 season.

Career highlights
- 2× AFL Women's premiership player: 2024, 2025; AFL Women's best and fairest: 2025; AFLCA AFLW champion player of the year: 2025; 5× AFL Women's All-Australian team: 2020, S6, 2023, 2024, 2025; 2× North Melbourne Club Champion: S6, 2025

Ashleigh Riddell (born 7 March 1996) is an Australian rules footballer playing for the North Melbourne Football Club in the AFL Women's (AFLW). Riddell won the AFL Women's best and fairest and AFLCA AFLW champion player of the year awards in 2025. She is a dual AFL Women's premiership player, five-time AFL Women's All-Australian and dual North Melbourne Club Champion.

== Early life ==
Riddell played junior football in Melbourne's north-east for the Eltham Panthers, crossing to basketball as a teenager due to "a greater long-term pathway". Following the AFL's decision to launch a new women's competition, she returned to football in 2016, playing for Fitzroy in the third division of the now-defunct Victorian Women's Football League (VWFL). Riddell then joined Diamond Creek in 2017 and was selected in the VFL Women's (VFLW) Team of the Year. She was invited to the first AFLW Draft Combine, but her rapid rise in the sport stalled when she was passed over at the 2017 AFL Women's draft.

With Diamond Creek not holding a VFLW licence for 2018, Riddell was persuaded by coach Scott Gowans to move to North Melbourne's affiliate women's team, Melbourne University. She was appointed captain in her first season at the club and was again named in the VFLW Team of the Year.

== AFL Women's career ==
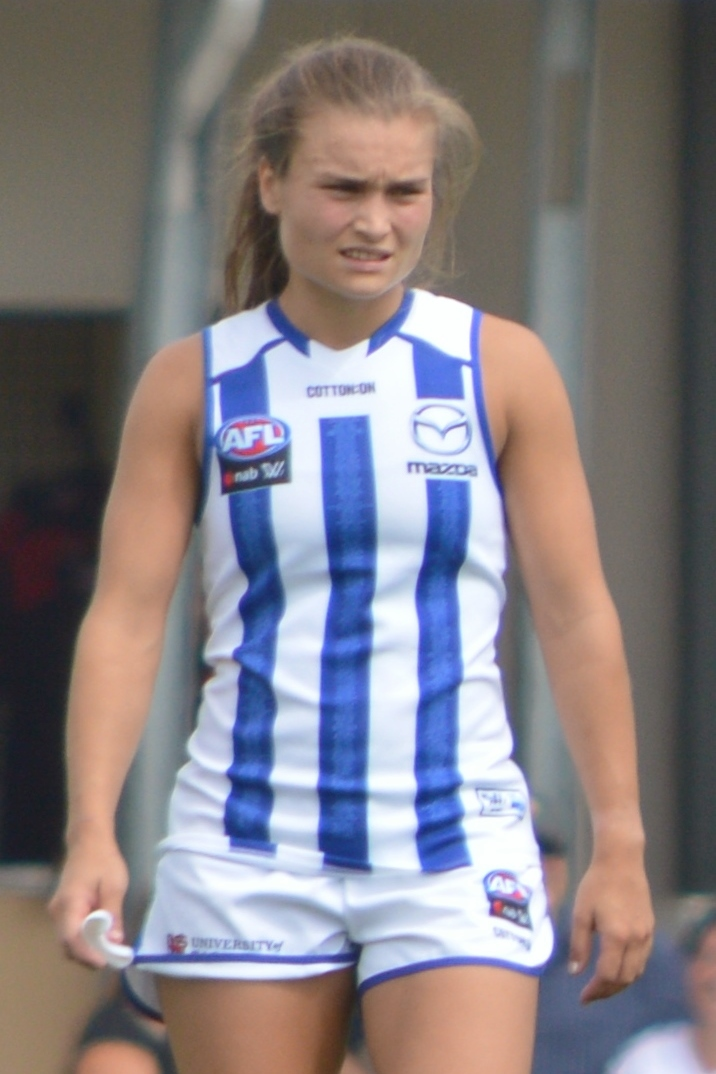
Riddell during a pre-season practice match for North Melbourne in 2019

Riddell was signed by North Melbourne as a free agent during the expansion club signing period of the 2018 AFL Women's draft. She made her debut in the club's inaugural match, a 36-point victory over Carlton at North Hobart Oval in the opening round of the 2019 season. Her season was cut short due to an ankle injury sustained the following week in North Melbourne's win over Greater Western Sydney when opponent Nicola Barr made an illegal shepherd behind play; Barr received a one-match suspension as a result.

Riddell was named in the 2020 AFL Women's All-Australian team after a standout season in which she led the competition for kicks. Leading into the 2021 season, womens.afl journalist Sarah Black named Riddell at no. 17 on her list of the top 30 players in the AFLW. She had another strong season in 2021, finishing third in her club's best and fairest count for the second consecutive year. At the end of the season, she re-signed with North Melbourne for two more seasons.

Riddell was named at no. 14 in Sarah Black's 2022 season 6 list of the top 30 players in the AFLW. She was best afield in North Melbourne's round 1 win over Geelong, equalling the AFLW record for most disposals in a match with 35; she also won the maximum ten coaches' votes and was named in womens.afl's Team of the Week for round 1. Riddell was North Melbourne's best player in its loss to Adelaide in round 2 and was best afield in North Melbourne's win over Greater Western Sydney in round 3; she again polled the maximum ten coaches' votes to top the leaderboard after round 3 and was selected in womens.afl's Team of the Week for that round. She was best afield in North Melbourne's win over Carlton in round 4, polling seven coaches' votes and again achieving selection in womens.afl's Team of the Week, and was among North Melbourne's best players in its win over Fremantle in round 5. At the halfway point of the season, Riddell led the competition for disposals with 139, at an average of 27.9 a game. She was among North Melbourne's best players in its win over Richmond in round 6, polling six coaches' votes, and was selected in womens.afl's Team of the Week for that round. Riddell was again among North Melbourne's best players in its round 7 win over Collingwood, polling six coaches' votes and was selected in womens.afl's Team of the Week for round 7. She was North Melbourne's best player in its losses to Melbourne in round 8 and Brisbane in round 9; she polled nine coaches' votes in the round 8 match, the equal-most for the match, and was selected in womens.afl's Team of the Week for that round. Riddell was best afield in North Melbourne's win over West Coast in round 10, breaking the record for most disposals in an AFLW match with 42; she polled the maximum ten coaches' votes to finish equal-second behind Emily Bates in that year's AFLW champion player of the year award, and was selected in womens.afl's Team of the Week for round 10. She was named in Champion Data's 2022 season 6 AFLW All-Star stats team after leading the competition for disposals with 29.9 a game, recording at least 30 disposals in six games. Riddell was North Melbourne's best player in its qualifying final loss to Fremantle. Despite reports of a "big offer" to join expansion club Sydney, Riddell re-signed with North Melbourne in June 2022 for a further two seasons.

In 2024, Riddell was named among North Melbourne's best players in its win over Brisbane in week 1 and draw against Geelong in week 2. She was named North Melbourne's best player in wins over Melbourne in week 3 and Port Adelaide in week 4.

== Statistics ==
Updated to the end of the 2025 season.

Legend
G	Goals	K	Kicks	D	Disposals	T	Tackles
B	Behinds	H	Handballs	M	Marks
#	Played in that season's premiership team	†	Led the league for the season	±	Won that season's AFLW B&F

Season	Team	No.	Games	Totals							Averages (per game)							Votes
Season	Team	No.	Games	G	B	K	H	D	M	T	G	B	K	H	D	M	T	Votes
2019	North Melbourne	7	2	1	1	20	6	26	3	9	0.5	0.5	10.0	3.0	13.0	1.5	4.5	2
2020	North Melbourne	7	7	1	4	112^{†}	37	149	23	32	0.1	0.6	16.0^{†}	5.3	21.3	3.3	4.6	1
2021	North Melbourne	7	10	3	5	141	77	218	32	45	0.3	0.5	14.1	7.7	21.8	3.2	4.5	10
2022 (S6)	North Melbourne	7	11	0	4	191	131^{†}	322^{†}	41	44	0.0	0.4	17.4^{†}	11.9	29.3^{†}	3.7	4.0	17
2022 (S7)	North Melbourne	7	13	1	4	199	90	289	37	53	0.1	0.3	15.3	6.9	22.2	2.8	4.1	7
2023	North Melbourne	7	13	2	5	226	162	388^{†}	48	69	0.2	0.4	17.4	12.5	29.8^{†}	3.7	5.3	16
2024^{#}	North Melbourne	7	14	5	2	227	183^{†}	410	42	93	0.4	0.1	16.2	13.1	29.3	3.0	6.6	20
2025^{#}	North Melbourne	7	15	6	5	271^{†}	261^{†}	532^{†}	46	61	0.3	0.4	18.1	17.4^{†}	35.5^{†}	3.1	4.1	23^{±}
Career			85	19	30	1387	947	2334	272	405	0.2	0.4	16.3	11.1	27.5	3.2	4.8	73

== Honours and achievements ==
Team

- 2× AFL Women's premiership player (North Melbourne): 2024, 2025
- 2× AFL Women's minor premiership (North Melbourne): 2024, 2025

Individual

- AFL Women's best and fairest: 2025
- AFLCA AFLW champion player of the year: 2025
- 5× AFL Women's All-Australian team: 2020, S6, 2023, 2024, 2025
- 2× North Melbourne Club Champion: S6, 2025
