= Jarrad Donders =

Australian rules football coach

Personal information
- Born: 1992/1993 (age 33–34)

Club information
- Current club: Richmond (AFLW)

Coaching career^{3}
Years	Club	Games (W–L–D)
2026–	Richmond (AFLW)	7(4–3–0)
- ^{3} Coaching statistics correct as of round 7, 2026.

Jarrad Donders (born 1992 or 1993) is the head coach of the Richmond Football Club in the AFL Women's (AFLW).

== Pre-Coaching career ==
Donders played Australian rules football with the Emerald Football Netball Club in the Yarra Ranges Football & Netball League. He was a physical education teacher at Emerald Secondary College, as well as acting as assistant principal. During his role as assistant principal, Donders established an extra curricular AFL program.

== Coaching career ==
Donders first coached with the Emerald Football Club at junior level. In 2018/2019 he became an assistant coach with Hawthorn's NGA program.

In 2022, Donders joined the Eastern Ranges Boys in the Talent League as a forward coach. In 2024, Donders was appointed as head coach of Eastern Ranges Girls. In 2024, they lost the grand final, however won it the year after. Donders also coached Vic Metro in the Under 18 Championships in 2025.

In February 2026 Donders was appointed the new coach of Richmond Football Club's AFL Women's team.
