= Isabelle Pritchard =

Australian rules footballer

Personal information
- Born: 8 March 2002 (age 24)
- Original team: Western Jets (NAB League Girls)
- Draft: No. 11, 2020 national draft
- Debut: 7 March 2021, Western Bulldogs vs. Collingwood, at Victoria Park
- Height: 178 cm (5 ft 10 in)
- Position: Defender

Club information
- Current club: Western Bulldogs
- Number: 4

Playing career^{1}
Years	Club	Games (Goals)
2021–	Western Bulldogs	34 (4)
- ^{1} Playing statistics correct to the end of the 2023 season.

Isabelle Pritchard is an Australian rules footballer playing for the Western Bulldogs in the AFL Women's league. Pritchard was recruited by the Western Bulldogs with the 16th pick in the 2020 AFL Women's draft. Pritchard debuted for Western Bulldogs in the 6th round of the 2021 AFL Women's season, where they suffered a loss to Collingwood. On debut, Pritchard collected 6 disposals, 1 mark and 3 tackles. It was revealed that Pritchard had signed a contract extension with the club on 16 June 2021, after playing 4 games for the club that season.

== Statistics ==
Statistics are correct to the end of the 2021 season.

Legend
G	Goals	K	Kicks	D	Disposals	T	Tackles
B	Behinds	H	Handballs	M	Marks

Season	Team	No.	Games	Totals							Averages (per game)							Votes
Season	Team	No.	Games	G	B	K	H	D	M	T	G	B	K	H	D	M	T	Votes
2021	Western Bulldogs	20	4	0	1	14	20	34	6	9	0.0	0.3	3.5	5.0	8.5	1.5	2.3	0
Career			4	0	1	14	20	34	6	9	0.0	0.3	3.5	5.0	8.5	1.5	2.3	0

== Personal life ==
Pritchard supported the Western Bulldogs growing up, and cited her brother as having an influence on her experience with football as he introduced her to the game.

She was educated at Melbourne Girls College.
