= Ellie McKenzie =

Australian rules footballer

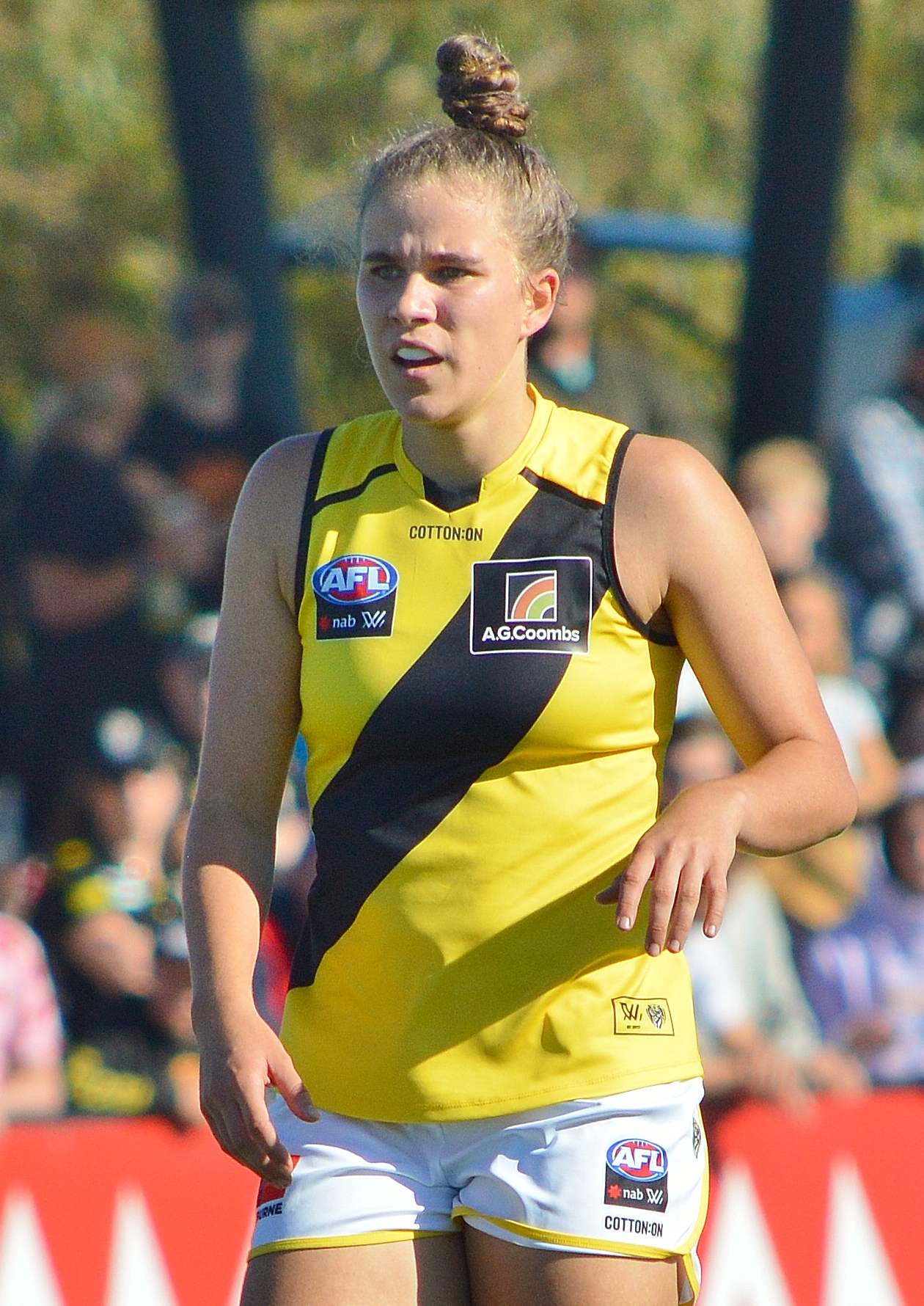
- McKenzie in February 2021

Personal information
- Full name: Elaine Anne McKenzie
- Born: 17 October 2002 (age 24)
- Original team: Northern Knights (NAB League Girls)
- Draft: No. 1, 2020 national draft
- Debut: Round 1, 2021, Richmond vs. Brisbane, at Punt Road Oval
- Height: 176 cm (5 ft 9 in)
- Position: Inside midfielder

Club information
- Current club: Richmond
- Number: 22

Playing career^{1}
Years	Club	Games (Goals)
2021–	Richmond	27 (8)
- ^{1} Playing statistics correct to the end of the 2023 season.

Career highlights
- Junior: Under-18 All-Australian: 2019; Senior: AFLW Best First Year Player (2021)

Elaine Anne McKenzie (born 17 October 2002) is an Australian rules footballer playing for the Richmond Football Club in the AFL Women's (AFLW).

== Early life and junior football ==
McKenzie grew up in the northern Melbourne suburb of Northcote. She first played junior football in 2010 in an under 10s boys team at the Fitzroy Junior Football Club before a representative stint with the Northern Knights in the NAB League Girls competition.

She earned All-Australian honours as a bottom age player at the 2019 AFL Women's Under 18 Championships but was unable to challenge for a consecutive honour after the 2020 series was cancelled due to the COVID-19 pandemic.

== AFL Women's career ==
McKenzie was drafted by Richmond with the first overall pick in the 2020 AFL Women's draft.

She made her debut against Brisbane at Punt Road Oval in the opening round of the 2021 season. She recorded 12 disposals in the loss, and was named among her side's best by AFL Media.

McKenzie won a 2021 AFL Women's Rising Star nomination for her role in Richmond's first ever AFLW win, recorded against Geelong. In that game, she had 16 disposals, 5 marks, a goal and 4 inside 50s. McKenzie won the league's best first year player award in 2021, following in the footsteps of Rising Star winner Chloe Molloy, Brownlow medallist Maddy Prespakis and St Kilda gun Georgia Patrikios. She received 137 votes to win the award, the closest to her being Bulldog Jess Fitzgerald on 63 votes. She also finished runner up in the team's best and fairest for 2021, finishing with 15 vote which was 1 behind winner Monique Conti, and won the team's best first year player award.

== Statistics ==
Statistics are correct to the end of the 2021 season.

Legend
G	Goals	K	Kicks	D	Disposals	T	Tackles
B	Behinds	H	Handballs	M	Marks

Season	Team	No.	Games	Totals							Averages (per game)							Votes
Season	Team	No.	Games	G	B	K	H	D	M	T	G	B	K	H	D	M	T	Votes
2021	Richmond	22	9	4	4	70	70	140	27	26	0.4	0.4	7.8	7.8	15.6	3.0	2.9	6
Career			9	4	4	70	70	140	27	26	0.4	0.4	7.8	7.8	15.6	3.0	2.9	6

== Personal life ==
McKenzie is the younger sister of former North Melbourne men's rookie Tom McKenzie.
