= Jess Fitzgerald =

AFLW (Women's) footballer

Jessica Fitzgerald

Personal information
- Born: 8 March 2002 (age 24)
- Original team: Northern Knights (NAB League Girls)
- Draft: No. 2, 2020 national draft
- Debut: 29 January 2021, Western Bulldogs vs. St Kilda, at Moorabbin Oval
- Height: 176 cm (5 ft 9 in)
- Position: Inside midfielder / Wing

Club information
- Current club: Western Bulldogs
- Number: 23

Playing career^{1}
Years	Club	Games (Goals)
2021–	Western Bulldogs	40 (8)
- ^{1} Playing statistics correct to the end of the 2023 season.

Jess Fitzgerald (born 8 March 2002) is an Australian rules footballer playing for Western Bulldogs in the AFL Women's (AFLW). She was drafted with the second selection in the 2020 AFL Women's draft by the Western Bulldogs.

== Early football ==
Growing up in Bundoora, Victoria, Fitzgerald played with the St Mary's Greensborough Kookaburras in the Yarra Junior Football League (YJFL) for four years from 2015 to 2018, amassing a total of 55 games with the team. She won the league best and fairest in the Under 15 Girls division in 2017. Fitzgerald attended school at Maribyrnong College, a specialist sports school. She began playing for the Northern Knights in 2018, as part of a development pathway from the YJFL to senior football. She played 11 games for the Knights in 2019, kicking 3 goals and averaging 14.1 disposals a game. Fitzgerald was awarded the best on ground award for the Grand Final, after she collected 16 disposals, four marks, five tackles and a behind. After the team's win, she stated "I'm not too much about the individual achievements, more about the team, I'll take it I guess, but really happy with the win." She also played for Vic Metro in the 2019 AFL Women's Under 18 Championships, playing two games, kicking a goal and averaging 14 disposals. She also played for the Northern Knights in 2020 but their season was cut short due to the impact of the COVID-19 pandemic. Despite the short season, she played 3 games and kicked 2 goals, both coming in the same match against the Dandenong Stingrays, while also averaging 18.7 disposals. She was named the co-captain of the team alongside future No.1 pick Ellie McKenzie.

== AFLW career ==
Fitzgerald debuted for the Western Bulldogs in the 1st round of the 2021 AFL Women's season, in the team's 9 point loss to St Kilda. On her debut, she collected 10 disposals, 1 mark and 3 tackles. The very next game in Round 2, in the team's thrilling one-goal win over Carlton, she was one of the Bulldogs' best on ground. In that game, she kicked her first goal, a running goal from 20 metres out, and also tallied up 15 disposals, 4 marks and a tackle. She won a rising star nomination for her performance in that game, alongside Melbourne player Tyla Hanks. Her very next game saw her pick up arguably the best goal of the Western Bulldogs' round 3 15 point win over Geelong, where she booted a 50m long bomb goal. A 2 goal performance in the Western Bulldogs' upset win over Melbourne saw her named as one of the team's best, also collecting 12 disposals, a game-high 7 tackles and a behind. After having a relatively quiet end to the season, Fitzgerald won team's the Best Young Player Award. It was revealed that Fitzgerald had signed a contract extension with the club on 16 June 2021, after playing every game possible for the club that season.

=== Statistics ===
Statistics are correct to round 6 end of the 2023 season.

Legend
G	Goals	K	Kicks	D	Disposals	T	Tackles
B	Behinds	H	Handballs	M	Marks

Season	Team	No.	Games	Totals							Averages (per game)							Votes
Season	Team	No.	Games	G	B	K	H	D	M	T	G	B	K	H	D	M	T	Votes
2021	Western Bulldogs	23	9	5	6	47	44	91	13	37	0.6	0.7	5.2	4.9	10.1	1.4	4.1	1
2022 (S6)	Western Bulldogs	23	10	2	1	56	58	114	15	39	0.2	0.1	5.6	5.8	11.4	1.5	3.9	0
2022 (S7)	Western Bulldogs	23	11	0	0	88	71	159	18	47	0.0	0.0	8.0	6.5	14.5	1.6	4.3	1
2023	Western Bulldogs	23	6	1	3	62	28	90	14	21	0.2	0.5	10.3	4.7	15.0	2.3	3.5	
Career			36	8	10	253	201	454	60	144	0.2	0.3	7.0	5.6	12.6	1.7	4.0	2

== Personal life ==
Fitzgerald supported the Collingwood Football Club in her youth. She cited her favourite AFL player to watch as Western Bulldogs forward Cody Weightman, and her favourite AFLW player to watch as either Kirsty Lamb or Jaimee Lambert.
