= Abbie McKay =

Australian rules football player (born 2000)

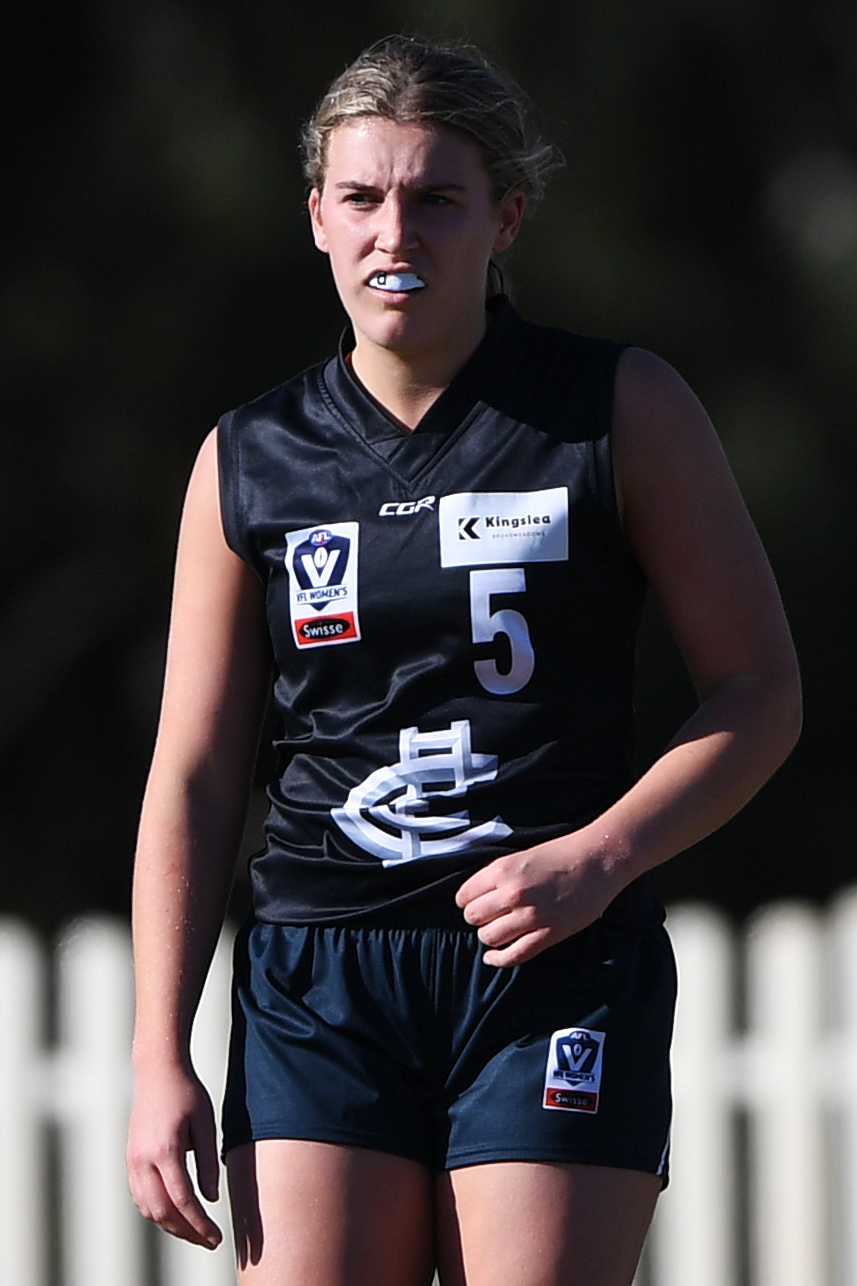
- McKay playing for Carlton's VFLW team in 2019

Personal information
- Full name: Abbie McKay
- Born: 15 November 2000 (age 25)
- Original team: Sandringham Dragons (TAC Cup Girls)
- Draft: No. 16 (F/D), 2018 national draft
- Debut: Round 4, 2019, Carlton vs. Geelong, at GMHBA Stadium
- Height: 171 cm (5 ft 7 in)
- Position: Midfielder

Club information
- Current club: Carlton
- Number: 5

Playing career^{1}
Years	Club	Games (Goals)
2019–	Carlton	63 (9)
- ^{1} Playing statistics correct to the end of the 2025 season.

Career highlights
- Carlton captain: 2025–; AFL Women's Rising Star nomination: 2021

Abbie McKay (born 15 November 2000) is an Australian rules footballer playing for the Carlton Football Club in the AFL Women's (AFLW). The daughter of Carlton premiership player Andrew, McKay was the first AFLW player drafted under the father–daughter rule, and has served as Carlton captain since 2025, following in the footsteps of her father. She was nominated for the AFL Women's Rising Star award in round 3 of the 2021 season.

== Early life ==
McKay's father Andrew was a premiership player for Carlton in 1995. Her younger sister Sophie McKay is a teammate at Carlton.

== AFL Women's career ==
McKay was selected by Carlton with the 16th pick in the 2018 draft as the first woman selected under the father–daughter rule. She made her debut against Geelong in round 4. After managing 4 games in her debut AFLW season, she played 12 games in the VFLW in 2019, kicking 3 goals and averaging 15 disposals, 10 contested possessions and 3.5 clearances. McKay struggled to break into the senior team in 2020, not playing any games at the highest level. McKay won a 2021 AFL Women's Rising Star nomination in the third round of the 2021 AFL Women's season after her 17 disposal, 7 tackle game against St Kilda. This game saw her break her disposals record and equal her tackles record.

She signed a 2-year contract with Carlton on 10 June 2021, after it was revealed the team had conducted a mass re-signing of 13 players.

Abbie McKay became the Carlton's sole AFLW captain in 2025. Her progression as a player has mirrored McKay’s exceptional development as a leader – 12 months on from stepping up as a vice captain of the side alongside Mimi Hill, who will retain the title for a third consecutive season.

== Statistics ==
Updated to the end of the 2025 season.

Legend
G	Goals	K	Kicks	D	Disposals	T	Tackles
B	Behinds	H	Handballs	M	Marks

Season	Team	No.	Games	Totals							Averages (per game)							Votes
Season	Team	No.	Games	G	B	K	H	D	M	T	G	B	K	H	D	M	T	Votes
2019	Carlton	5	4	0	1	9	21	30	3	6	0.0	0.3	2.3	5.3	7.5	0.8	1.5	0
2020	Carlton	5	0	—	—	—	—	—	—	—	—	—	—	—	—	—	—	0
2021	Carlton	5	3	0	1	7	36	43	1	20	0.0	0.3	2.3	12.0	14.3	0.3	6.7	0
2022 (S6)	Carlton	5	10	3	3	51	87	138	13	33	0.3	0.3	5.1	8.7	13.8	1.3	3.3	0
2022 (S7)	Carlton	5	10	0	3	90	117	207	12	74	0.0	0.3	9.0	11.7	20.7	1.2	7.4	8
2023	Carlton	5	10	3	2	104	119	223	13	58	0.3	0.2	10.4	11.9	22.3	1.3	5.8	2
2024	Carlton	5	9	1	1	75	113	188	2	51	0.1	0.1	8.3	12.6	20.9	0.2	5.7	0
2025	Carlton	5	11	2	1	130	114	244	18	50	0.2	0.1	11.8	10.4	22.2	1.6	4.5	6
Career			63	9	12	488	650	1138	65	311	0.1	0.2	7.7	10.3	18.1	1.0	4.9	16

== Honours and achievements ==
- Carlton captain: 2025–present
- AFL Women's Rising Star nomination: 2021
