= Courtney Hodder =

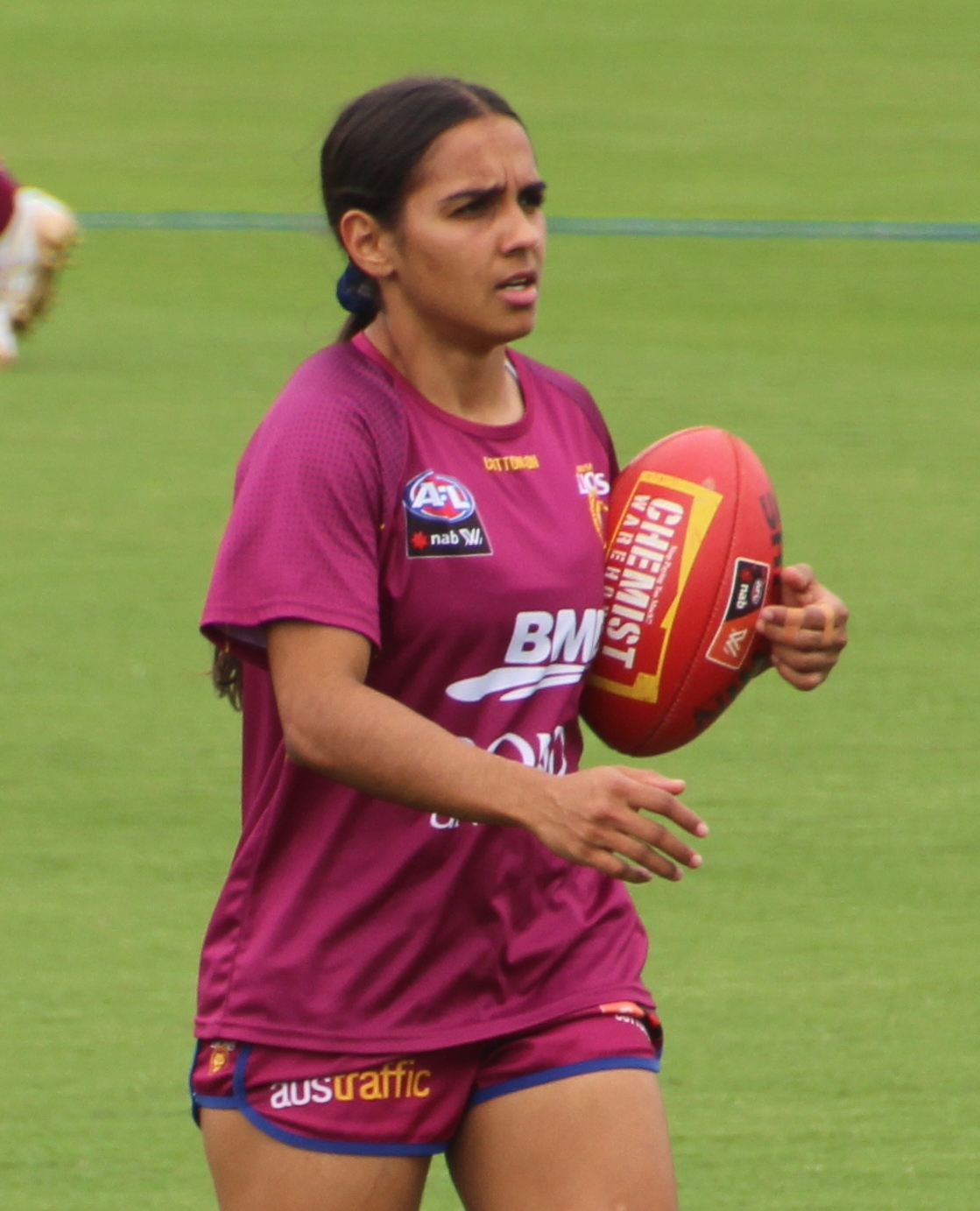
- Hodder warming up before the 2022 (S7) AFL Women's Grand Final
- Born: Courtney Mariah Rose Hodder; 8 July 2000 (age 26)
- Height: 155 cm (5 ft 1 in)
Australian rules football career
Personal information
- Original team: Queensland Reds (Super W)
- Draft: Rookie signing, 2020
- Debut: Round 1, 2021, Brisbane vs. Richmond, at Punt Road Oval
- Position: Midfielder / forward
Club information
- Current club: Brisbane
- Number: 21
Playing career^{1}
Years	Club	Games (Goals)
2021–	Brisbane	77 (52)
- ^{1} Playing statistics correct to the end of the 2025 season.
Career highlights
- AFL Women's Rising Star nominee: 2021; AFLW premiership player: 2021, 2023; AFLW Goal of the Year: 2021; AFLW Mark of the Year: 2023

Rugby union career
- Position: Full-back
Senior career
Years	Team	Apps	(Points)
2018	Force	4	(35)
2020	Reds	4	(25)
Total		8	(60)
- Correct as of the end of the 2020 season
International career
Years	Team	Apps	(Points)
2019	Australia A	2	(0)
- Correct as of the end of 2019

Courtney Mariah Rose Hodder (born 8 July 2000) is an Australian rules footballer and former rugby union player currently playing for Brisbane in the AFL Women's (AFLW). She previously played rugby for the Western Force and the Queensland Reds in the Super W, finishing as the competition's top try-scorer in 2018.

== Early life ==
Hodder is a Noongar–Yamatji woman. She grew up in suburban Perth and played junior football with Peel Thunder, earning selection in three under-18 All-Australian teams.

== Rugby union ==
Hodder played for the Western Force in the inaugural season of the Super W in 2018. She scored six tries in the Force's round 1 match against the Melbourne Rebels, and finished the season as the competition's top try-scorer.

She missed the 2019 Super W season due to a broken leg. Following her recovery, she was selected late in the year to represent Australia A in the Oceania Rugby Women's Championship, making two appearances.

She returned to Super W in 2020 to play for the Queensland Reds, scoring five tries across the shortened season.

== Australian rules football ==
On 28 August 2020, Brisbane signed Hodder for the 2021 AFL Women's season as an other-sport rookie. She made her debut in round 1 against Richmond, kicking a goal with her first kick in the competition. She is a two-time premiership player, having been part of Brisbane's grand final victories in 2021 and 2023.

She won the AFLW Goal of the Year in 2021. She later won the AFLW Mark of the Year in 2023 with a Riewoldt-like mark running back with the flight of the ball against Adelaide.

== Statistics ==
Statistics are correct to the end of the 2025 season.

Legend
G	Goals	K	Kicks	D	Disposals	T	Tackles
B	Behinds	H	Handballs	M	Marks

Season	Team	No.	Games	Totals							Averages (per game)							Votes
Season	Team	No.	Games	G	B	K	H	D	M	T	G	B	K	H	D	M	T	Votes
2021	Brisbane	21	11	9	8	55	30	85	7	59	0.8	0.7	5.0	2.7	7.7	0.6	5.4	0
2022 (S6)	Brisbane	21	11	9	5	63	43	106	8	50	0.8	0.5	5.7	3.9	9.6	0.7	4.5	0
2022 (S7)	Brisbane	21	13	8	8	74	44	118	15	57	0.6	0.6	5.7	3.4	9.1	1.2	4.4	0
2023	Brisbane	21	13	6	10	71	50	121	13	108	0.5	0.8	5.5	3.8	9.3	1.0	8.3	0
2024	Brisbane	21	11	4	8	55	66	121	10	73	0.4	0.7	5.0	6.0	11.0	0.9	6.6	0
2025	Brisbane	21	18	16	13	148	130	278	34	112	0.9	0.7	8.2	7.2	15.4	1.9	6.2	0
Career			77	52	52	466	363	829	87	459	0.7	0.7	6.1	4.7	10.8	1.1	6.0	0

== Honours and achievements ==
Team

- 2× AFLW premiership player: 2021, 2023
- AFLW minor premiership: 2022 (S7)
- McClelland Trophy / Club Championship: 2025

Individual

- AFL Women's Rising Star nominee: 2021
- AFLW Goal of the Year: 2021
- AFLW Mark of the Year: 2023

== See also ==
- List of players who have converted from one football code to another
