= Eliza McNamara =

Australian rules footballer

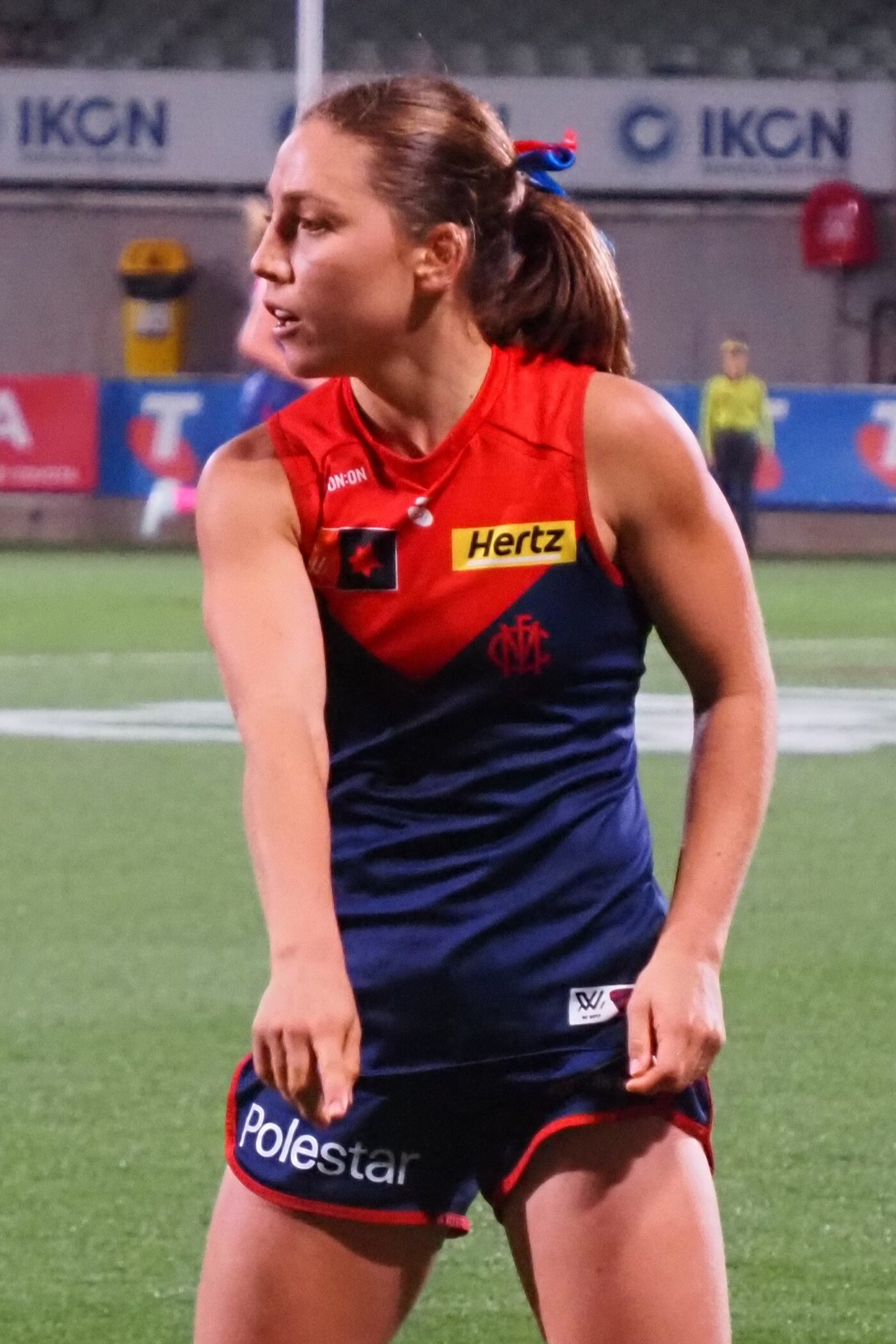
- McNamara playing for Melbourne in 2025

Personal information
- Full name: Elizabeth Mary McNamara
- Born: 19 April 2002 (age 24)
- Original team: Sandringham Dragons (NAB League Girls)
- Draft: No. 15, 2020 national draft
- Debut: Round 1, 2021, Melbourne vs. Gold Coast, at Metricon Stadium
- Height: 166 cm (5 ft 5 in)
- Position: Midfielder

Club information
- Current club: Melbourne
- Number: 22

Playing career^{1}
Years	Club	Games (Goals)
2021–	Melbourne	59 (9)
- ^{1} Playing statistics correct to the end of the 2025 season.

Career highlights
- AFL Women's Rising Star nominee: 2021

Elizabeth Mary McNamara (born 19 April 2002) is an Australian rules footballer playing for the Melbourne Football Club in the AFL Women's (AFLW). She was nominated for the 2021 AFL Women's Rising Star award in round 7 of the 2021 season.

== Early life ==
She'll get hit, knocked over and bounces straight back up and does not flinch at anything so, yeah, she's a little weapon who's worked so, so hard.

— Daisy Pearce, Melbourne captain

McNamara initially grew up playing basketball before picking up football at the age of twelve, playing for the Ashburton United Junior Football Club and the East Malvern Football Club. She grew up idolising Melbourne captain Daisy Pearce and Western Bulldogs premiership player Bonnie Toogood, as well as Australian Olympic gold medallist Cathy Freeman.

McNamara played under-18s football for the Sandringham Dragons in the NAB League Girls, averaging 17 disposals and six tackles in three matches before the season was shut down due to the COVID-19 pandemic. Originally an inside midfielder, she made the switch to become an outside midfielder after suffering a serious concussion playing for Sandringham in 2019. When the Victorian draft combine was cancelled due to COVID-19 restrictions and players were forced to run their own two-kilometre time trials, McNamara recorded an unofficial time of 6:59, which would have beaten the record set by Geelong midfielder Nina Morrison (7:14) if run under combine conditions.

== AFL Women's career ==
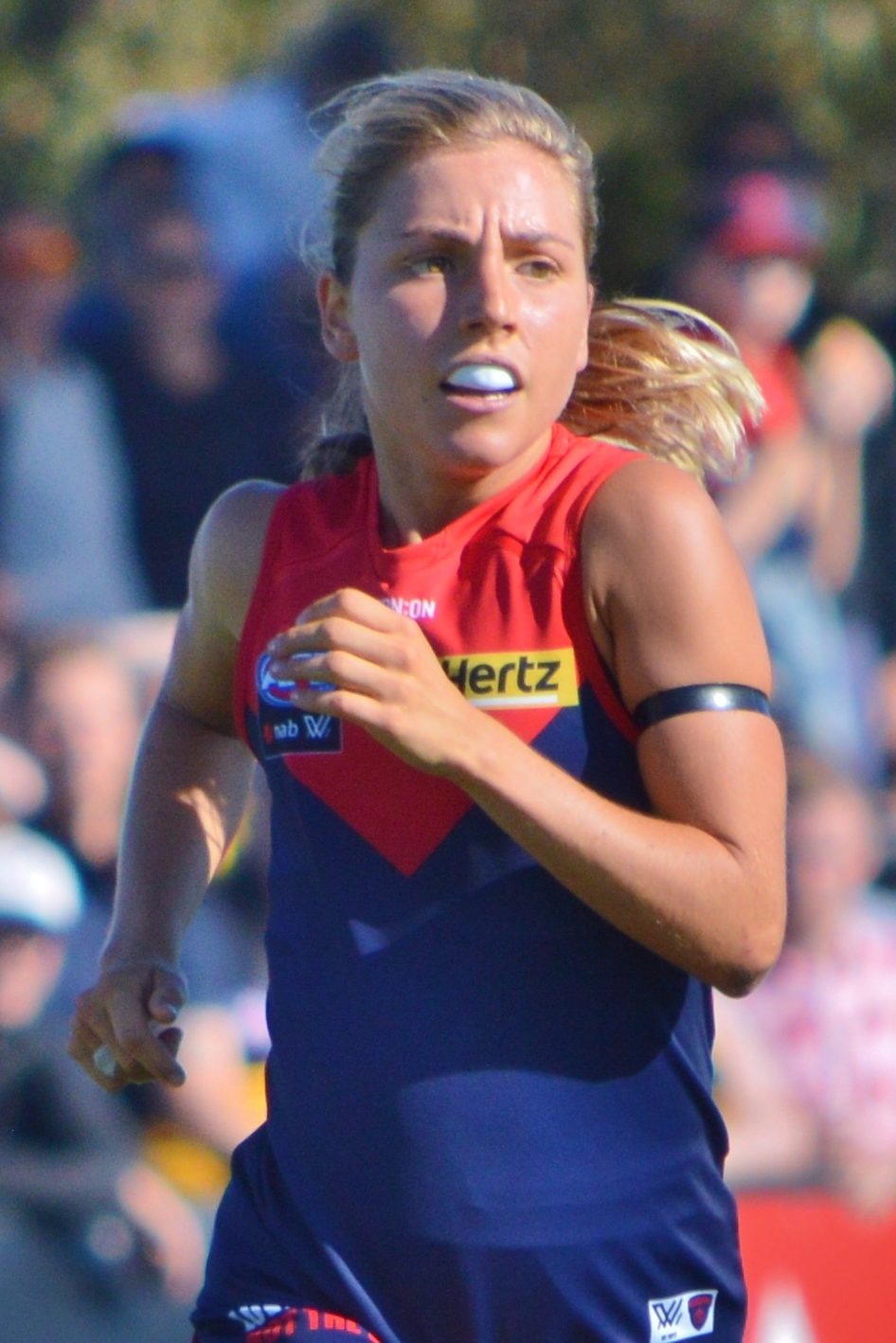
McNamara playing for Melbourne in 2021

McNamara was drafted by Melbourne with its second selection and fifteenth overall in the 2020 AFL Women's draft. On her first day of pre-season, she won the club's two-kilometre time trial ahead of regular winner Karen Paxman, again running in under seven minutes. Melbourne captain Daisy Pearce described McNamara as "one of the toughest people I've ever played with" in the lead-up to her first game. McNamara made her AFL Women's debut in Melbourne's 21-point win over Gold Coast at Metricon Stadium in round 1 of the 2021 season, and was named among the Demons' best players with 18 disposals. She received a nomination for the 2021 AFL Women's Rising Star award in round 7 after recording 16 disposals and five tackles in Melbourne's win over Adelaide. McNamara suffered a concussion after colliding with Adelaide captain Chelsea Randall in the first quarter of Melbourne's preliminary final loss to Adelaide, which would have ruled her out of playing in the grand final the following week had Melbourne progressed.

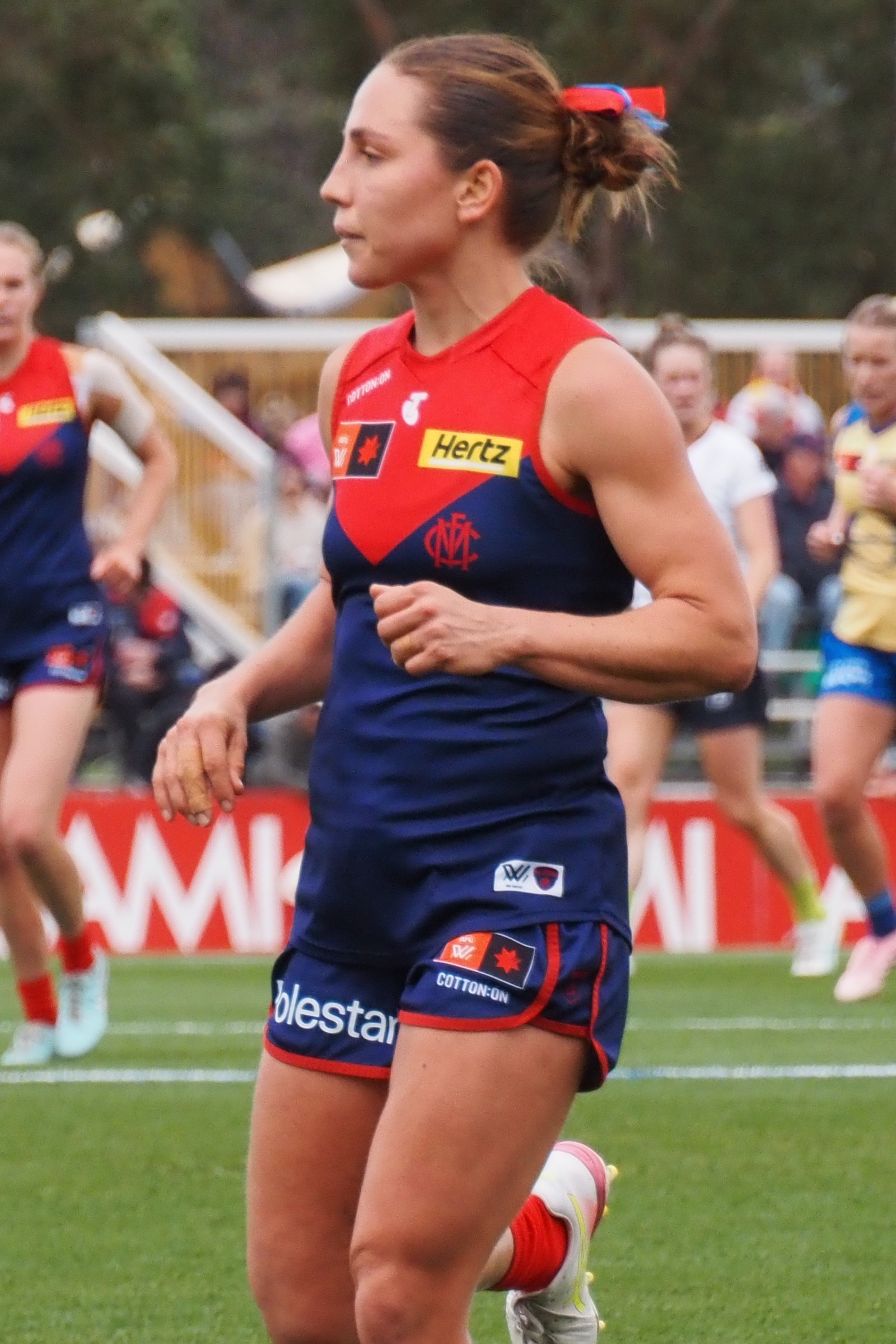
McNamara playing for Melbourne in 2025

On the opening day of the season 6 pre-season, McNamara again finished first in Melbourne's two-kilometre time trial. She was forced to miss Melbourne's round 1 match against the Western Bulldogs due to the AFL's health and safety protocols, playing her first match of the year the following week against Richmond. She was named Melbourne's best player in its loss to Adelaide in round 4, leading Melbourne for disposals with a career-high 22, and was among Melbourne's best players in its win over Brisbane in round 7. McNarama was one of four Melbourne players named in the initial 40-woman squad for that season's AFL Women's 22under22 team. She kicked a goal and was among Melbourne's best players in its preliminary final win over Brisbane, as Melbourne progressed to the 2022 AFL Women's season 6 Grand Final, its first grand final appearance.

In July, McNamara was ruled out of season seven after fracturing the lumbar region of her spine in a training accident, which would require a "serious, year-long (rehabilitation)", and caused her to miss Melbourne's season 7 premiership win.

McNamara played her first game since her spine injury in Melbourne's win over Collingwood in round 1 of the 2023 season.

In 2024, McNamara was named among Melbourne's best players in its win over Geelong in round 1.

== Statistics ==
Updated to the end of the 2025 season.

Legend
G	Goals	K	Kicks	D	Disposals	T	Tackles
B	Behinds	H	Handballs	M	Marks

Season	Team	No.	Games	Totals							Averages (per game)							Votes
Season	Team	No.	Games	G	B	K	H	D	M	T	G	B	K	H	D	M	T	Votes
2021	Melbourne	22	11	2	2	90	28	118	16	30	0.2	0.2	8.2	2.5	10.7	1.5	2.7	0
2022 (S6)	Melbourne	22	11	2	1	102	55	157	32	39	0.2	0.1	9.3	5.0	14.3	2.9	3.5	0
2022 (S7)	Melbourne	22	0	—	—	—	—	—	—	—	—	—	—	—	—	—	—	0
2023	Melbourne	22	12	3	4	130	54	184	32	42	0.3	0.3	10.8	4.5	15.3	2.7	3.5	0
2024	Melbourne	22	10	1	0	148	74	222	36	55	0.1	0.0	14.8	7.4	22.2	3.6	5.5	1
2025	Melbourne	22	15	1	4	213	118	331	51	65	0.1	0.3	14.2	7.9	22.1	3.4	4.3	2
Career			59	9	11	683	329	1012	167	231	0.2	0.2	11.6	5.6	17.2	2.8	3.9	3

== Honours and achievements ==
Team

- McClelland Trophy (Melbourne): 2023

Individual

- AFL Women's Rising Star nominee: 2021
