= Tyla Hanks =

Australian rules footballer

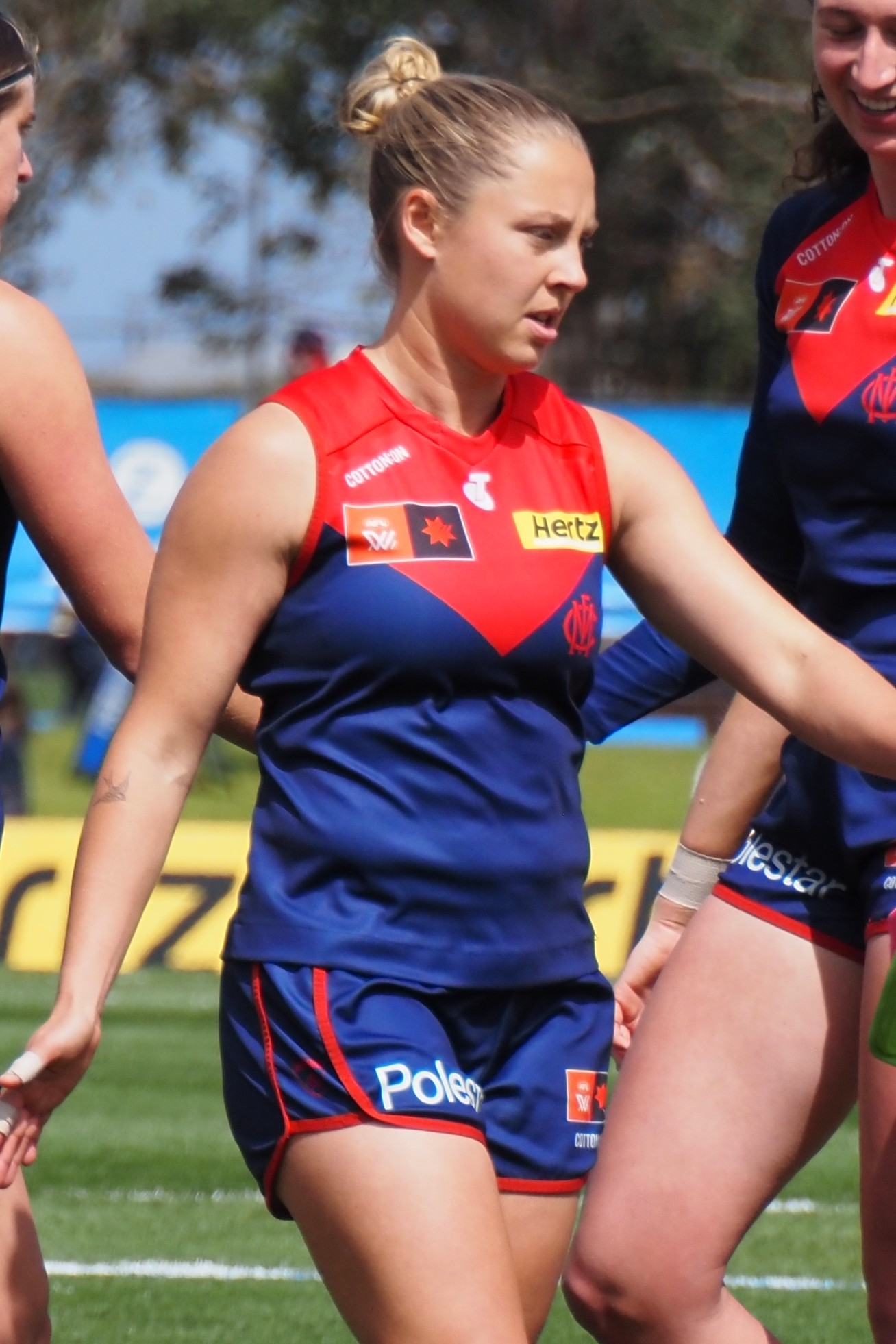
- Hanks pre-match with Melbourne in 2025

Personal information
- Born: 15 February 2000 (age 26)
- Original teams: Gippsland Power (TAC Cup Girls); Carlton (VFLW)
- Draft: No. 6, 2018 AFLW draft
- Debut: Round 1, 2019, Melbourne vs. Fremantle, at Casey Fields
- Height: 157 cm (5 ft 2 in)
- Position: Inside midfielder

Club information
- Current club: Melbourne
- Number: 5

Playing career^{1}
| Years | Club | Games (Goals) |
| 2019– | Melbourne | 87 (23) |
- ^{1} Playing statistics correct to the end of the 2025 season.

Career highlights
- AFLW premiership player: 2022 (S7); AFL Women's Rising Star: 2021

Tyla Hanks (born 15 February 2000) is an Australian rules footballer playing for Melbourne in the AFL Women's (AFLW). An inside midfielder, she played junior football in the TAC Cup Girls and VFL Women's, and competed at four AFL Women's Under 18 Championships. Hanks was recruited by Melbourne with pick 6 in the 2018 AFLW draft and debuted in the opening round of the 2019 season.

== Early life ==
Hanks's junior football began when she was four or five years old; attending the Nar Nar Goon Auskick program. She also played basketball as a junior. Hanks played in boys football competitions in Cora Lynn, Victoria, but moved to Beaconsfield after finishing under-13s to continue with a girls team. She attended St Francis Xavier College and graduated into 2016.Hanks represented Vic Metro in the 2015 and 2016 AFL Women's Under 18 Championships, but switched to Vic Country after selection zones changed for the 2017 competition. She was named in the 2017 All-Australian side in the forward pocket. After the championships Hanks was named in the 2018 AFLW Academy squad as one of twenty-nine seventeen-year-old prospects. As part of this squad she could attend development camps and train with Australian Football League clubs.

In 2018, Hanks began studying exercise science at the Australian Catholic University. She co-captained the Gippsland Power in the TAC Cup Girls and was named in the league's Team of the Year. Hanks placed third in the league's best and fairest with 15 votes, one vote behind joint winners Nina Morrison and Maddy Prespakis. Hanks attended the AFL Women's Under 18 Championships and was again named in the All-Australian team, this time as a follower. She played for Carlton in the VFL Women's (VFLW); on debut against Geelong at GMHBA Stadium in round 4, she amassed 19 contested possessions and 11 clearances – besting all players – and a team-high 20 disposals. Aasta O'Connor, who oversaw the AFLW Academy program, believed Hanks would eventually captain an AFLW club. She tested at the 2018 AFLW draft combine and set a record in the agility component with a time of 8.788 seconds, also finishing fifth in the yo-yo test. For the 2018 AFLW draft, prospects were required to nominate a state or region they wished to play in; Hanks was to nominate the Melbourne metropolitan area, preventing Geelong from recruiting her.

== AFLW career ==
Hanks was recruited by Melbourne with pick 6 in the 2018 AFLW draft, their first selection. She injured her knee in a practice match against Melbourne's VFLW affiliate Casey Demons, resulting in bone bruising but no muscle or ligament damage. The injury interrupted Hanks's pre-season but did not prevent her from making her AFLW debut in the opening round of the 2019 season; a loss to Fremantle at Casey Fields. She played all seven matches in her first season.

== Statistics ==
Statistics are correct to the end of the 2021 season.

Legend
| G | Goals | K | Kicks | D | Disposals | T | Tackles |
| B | Behinds | H | Handballs | M | Marks |

| Season | Team | No. | Games | Totals | | | | | | | Averages (per game) | | | | | | | Votes |
| Season | Team | No. | Games | G | B | K | H | D | M | T | G | B | K | H | D | M | T | Votes |
|---|---|---|---|---|---|---|---|---|---|---|---|---|---|---|---|---|---|---|
| 2019 | Melbourne | 28 | 7 | 3 | 1 | 37 | 21 | 58 | 9 | 15 | 0.4 | 0.1 | 5.3 | 3.0 | 8.3 | 1.3 | 2.1 | 0 |
| 2020 | Melbourne | 28 | 7 | 0 | 3 | 44 | 29 | 73 | 9 | 33 | 0.0 | 0.4 | 6.3 | 4.1 | 10.4 | 1.3 | 4.7 | 0 |
| 2021 | Melbourne | 5 | 11 | 2 | 5 | 109 | 97 | 206 | 28 | 52 | 0.2 | 0.5 | 9.9 | 8.8 | 18.7 | 2.5 | 4.7 | 8 |
| Career | | | 25 | 5 | 9 | 190 | 147 | 337 | 46 | 100 | 0.2 | 0.4 | 7.6 | 5.9 | 13.5 | 1.8 | 4.0 | 8 |
