= 2026 AFL Women's Australia v Ireland match =

2026 AFLW Australia v Ireland
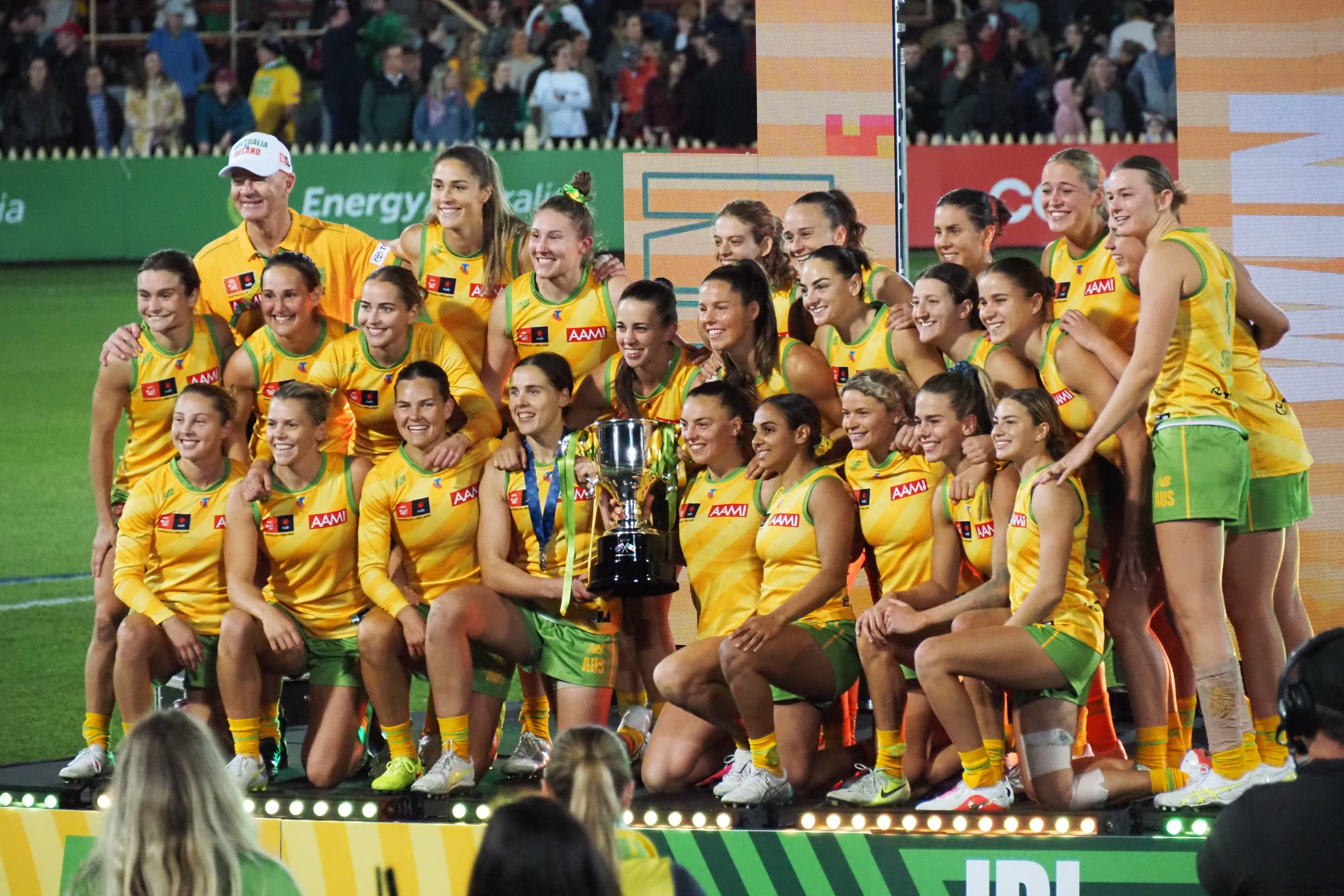
- Australian players pose with the trophy after the match

Australia	Ireland
13.13 (91)	6.5 (41)
	1	2	3	4
AUS	3.6 (24)	9.7 (61)	11.9 (75)	13.13 (91)
IRL	2.0 (12)	5.1 (31)	5.4 (34)	6.5 (41)
- Date: 1 August 2026
- Stadium: North Sydney Oval
- Attendance: 9,017

Broadcast in Australia
- Network: Fox Footy

The 2026 AFL Women's Australia v Ireland match, known for sponsorship reasons as NAB AFLW Australia v Ireland, was a women's Australian rules football match organised by the AFL Women's (AFLW).

The match was played on 1 August 2026 and was contested by Australia and Ireland, the two countries with the highest number of players from the respective countries in the AFLW. The great majority of the Irish players had been trained to play Gaelic football before being recruited by Australian professional AFL clubs. It was the first international representative match of Australian rules football to be staged at the professional level for either men's or women's football. Australia won the match by 50 points.

== Background ==
The growth of women's Australian rules football that followed the inception of the AFLW competition in 2017 quickly provided an outlet for a significant amount of Irish female Gaelic footballers to develop a professional Australian rules football career in the AFLW. Over time this led to calls from several players for a match pitting Australia and Ireland against one another to be played, with media reports differing over whether such a contest would be an Australian rules football or International rules football match; the latter being a hybrid code combining elements of Gaelic football and Australian football. The International Rules Series between the Australia and Ireland men's teams had last been held in 2017, and a women's series unsanctioned by the AFL was contested in 2006.

In April 2026 the league's official website reported the proposed match, to be played under the laws of Australian rules football, would be formalised in the coming weeks. The fixture was announced on 14 May 2026, making it the first professional-level Australian rules football match to be played between Australia and another country. The match was held two weeks prior to the start of the 2026 AFL Women's season, following the previous season which featured a record 40 Irish players playing on AFLW lists, three of which won club best-and-fairest awards, and five who were named in the All-Australian team. It was also the first representative match of any kind in the AFLW since 2017, when Victoria defeated the Allies.

The coaches were confirmed on 27 May, with two-time North Melbourne premiership coach Darren Crocker appointed coach of the Australia team, and newly appointed Sydney coach Colin O'Riordan named coach of the Irish team. O'Riordan had been a recent retiree from the AFL and the first Irish-born person to be appointed coach of an AFLW team. Eight players for each side were announced on 21 June, including the first Irish player to be named in an All-Australian team Orla O'Dwyer and Melbourne captain Kate Hore. The full 25-player Irish team was unveiled on 23 June, at which point the league revealed that the usual complement of 16 on-field players would be supplemented by an extended interchange of nine players, up from five in the regular season. The full Australian team was announced the following day, with five North Melbourne players named in the squad, the highest of any club. In total 13 of the clubs were represented in the Australian team.

The team captains were unveiled on 26 July, with North Melbourne's Jasmine Garner and Brisbane's Orla O'Dwyer named captains of the Australia and Ireland sides respectively. A trophy, named the Australia v Ireland Cup was unveiled shortly thereafter, as well as each player's number, which was accompanied by their surnames on the backs of their uniforms. As with the 2026 AFL Origin men's match held in February, the league instituted a rule decreeing that numbers were to be allocated based on player preference, followed by total games played.

=== Venue selection ===
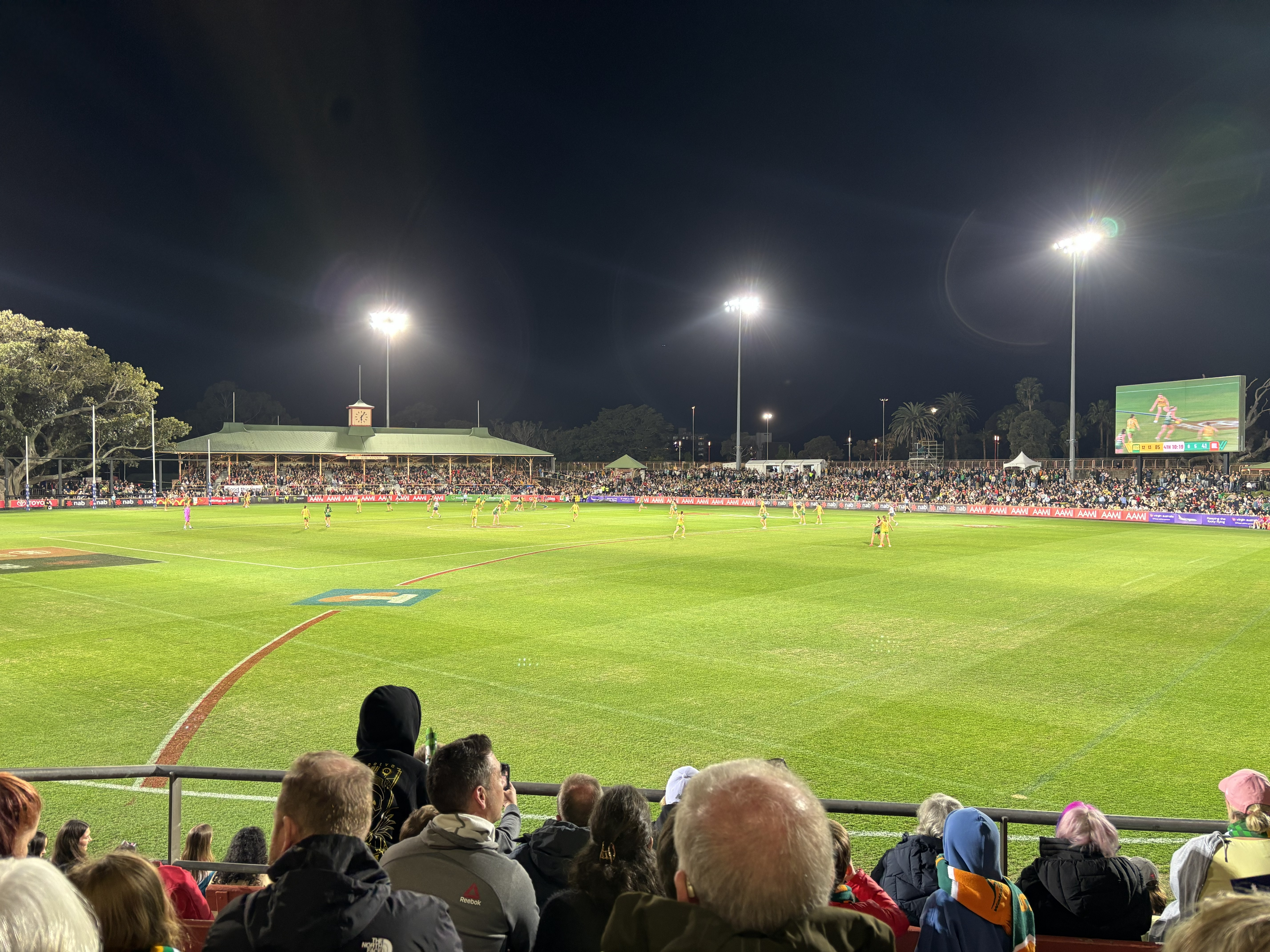
A view of North Sydney Oval during the match.

The selection of North Sydney Oval, a 10,000-capacity boutique ground in Sydney's inner North with the smallest dimensions of any AFLW ground, attracted significant controversy owing to tickets selling out several weeks in advance of the match. This led to several calls for the game to be moved to the 48,000-capacity Sydney Cricket Ground, the home ground of the Sydney Swans men's team, an option which had been initially floated by the AFL when the fixture was announced. The league opted to keep the match at North Sydney Oval and worked with Sydney-based pubs to set up "fan zones" for the city's large Irish ex-patriate community and other fans who missed out securing tickets to the game. League executive Laura Kane stated "our priority is making sure that we have a packed-out stadium, and we are going to get that with North Sydney Oval".

== Teams ==
Australia

Coach: Darren Crocker

No.	Player	Club
1	Mim Strom	Fremantle
2	Libby Birch	North Melbourne
3	Charlie Thomas	West Coast
4	Monique Conti	Richmond
5	Tyla Hanks	Melbourne
6	Maddi Gay	Essendon
7	Ash Riddell	North Melbourne
8	Kate Hore	Melbourne
9	Breanna Koenen	Brisbane
10	Ebony Marinoff	Adelaide
11	Tyanna Smith	St Kilda
12	Sophie Conway	Brisbane
13	Nina Morrison	Geelong
14	Ella Roberts	West Coast
15	Chloe Molloy	Sydney
16	Tahlia Randall	North Melbourne
17	Tahlia Gillard	Melbourne
20	Harriet Cordner	Carlton
21	Courtney Hodder	Brisbane
22	Ellie McKenzie	Richmond
23	Zippy Fish	Sydney
25	Jasmine Garner (c)	North Melbourne
29	Matilda Scholz	Port Adelaide
32	Chelsea Biddell	Adelaide
41	Georgie Prespakis	Geelong
~~–~~	~~Maeve Chaplin~~	~~Melbourne~~
~~–~~	~~Emma Kearney~~	~~North Melbourne~~

Ireland

Coach: Colin O'Riordan

No.	Player	Club
1	Aisling McCarthy	Fremantle
2	Orlagh Lally	Sydney
3	Kayleigh Cronin	Adelaide
4	Niamh Martin	Hawthorn
5	Grace Kos	Greater Western Sydney
6	Eilish O'Dowd	Greater Western Sydney
7	Sarah Rowe	Collingwood
8	Aine McDonagh	Hawthorn
9	Orla O'Dwyer (c)	Brisbane
10	Blaithin Bogue	North Melbourne
11	Clara Fitzpatrick	Gold Coast
12	Jennifer Dunne	Brisbane
13	Vikki Wall	North Melbourne
14	Erika O'Shea	North Melbourne
15	Paris McCarthy	Sydney
17	Dayna Finn	Carlton
19	Erone Fitzpatrick	Carlton
20	Niamh McLaughlin	Gold Coast
21	Amy Gavin Mangan	North Melbourne
22	Rachel Kearns	Geelong
23	Niamh Kelly	Adelaide
24	Amy Boyle-Carr	Adelaide
25	Aisling Reidy	Carlton
26	Neasa Dooley	Brisbane
45	Aishling Moloney	Geelong
~~–~~	~~Sinead Goldrick~~	~~Melbourne~~
~~–~~	~~Grace Kelly~~	~~Adelaide~~
~~–~~	~~Tanya Kennedy~~	~~Sydney~~

Note: Maeve Chaplin and Emma Kearney withdrew from the Australian side due to sustaining injuries in the lead-up to the game. They were replaced by Breanna Koenen and Nina Morrison. Sinead Goldrick, Grace Kelly and Tanya Kennedy withdrew from the Irish side due to injuries, and they were replaced by Grace Kos, Aisling Reidy and Clara Fitzpatrick.

== Scorecard ==
2026 AFLW Australia v Ireland
Saturday, 1 August; 4:15 pm (AEST)	Australia	def.	(Republic of Ireland) Ireland	North Sydney Oval (crowd: 9,017)
3.6 (24); 9.7 (61); 11.9 (75); 13.13 (91)	Q1; Q2; Q3; Final	2.0 (12); 5.1 (31); 5.4 (34); 6.4 (41)	Best on ground: Jasmine Garner (Australia)
Randall 4 Molloy 2 Fish, Hore, Garner, Conway, Conti, Hodder, Morrison 1	Goals	Bogue 3 Dooley, O'Dwyer, McLaughlin 1
Garner, Randall, Riddell, Marinoff, Strom, Conti	Best	Bogue, A.McCarthy, Rowe, O'Shea, O'Dwyer, Dunne
Prespakis (throat), McKenzie (arm)	Injuries	Nil

== Match summary ==
External videos
- Match highlights on the AFL Women's official YouTube channel

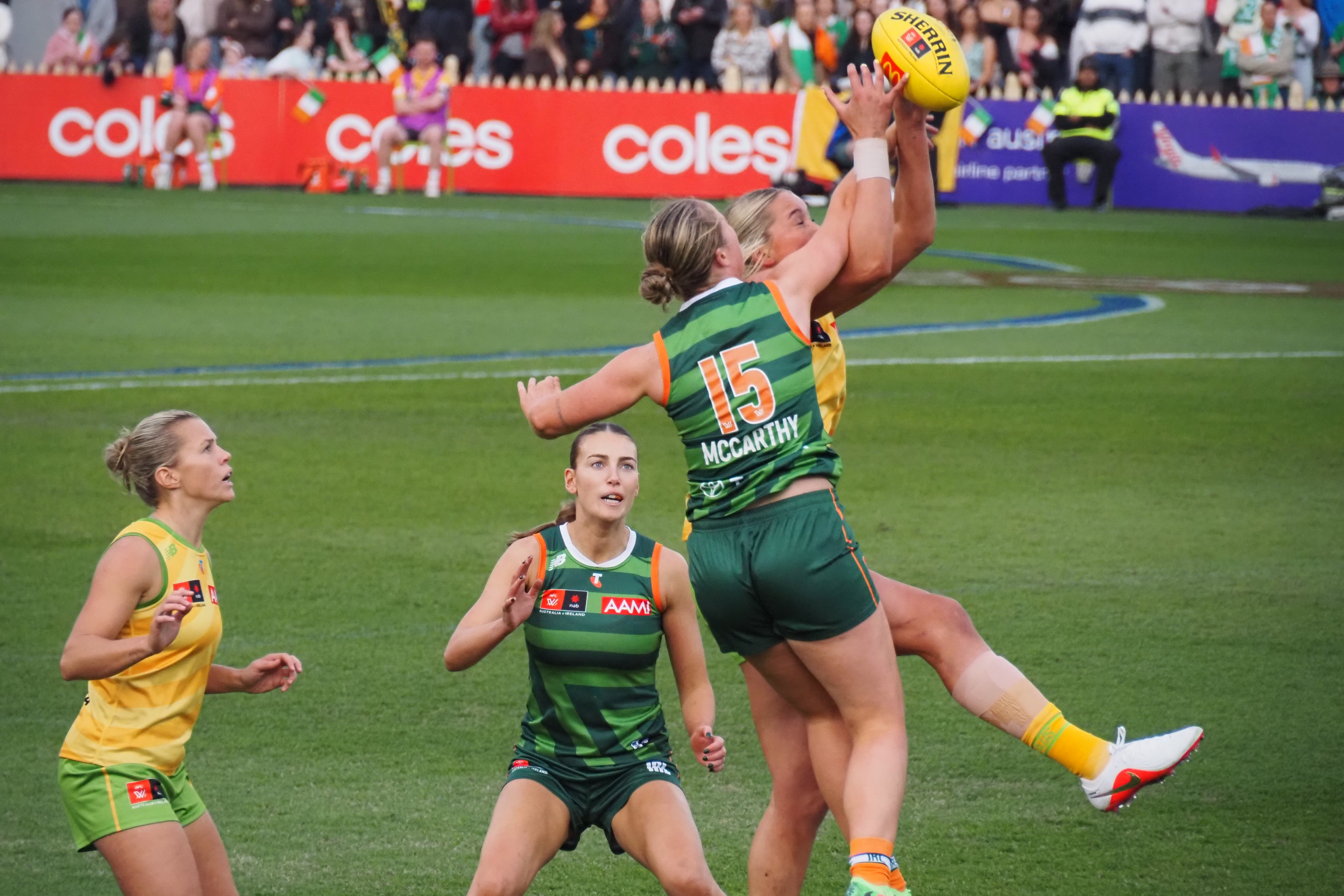
Matilda Scholz (Australia) outmarks Paris McCarthy (Ireland)

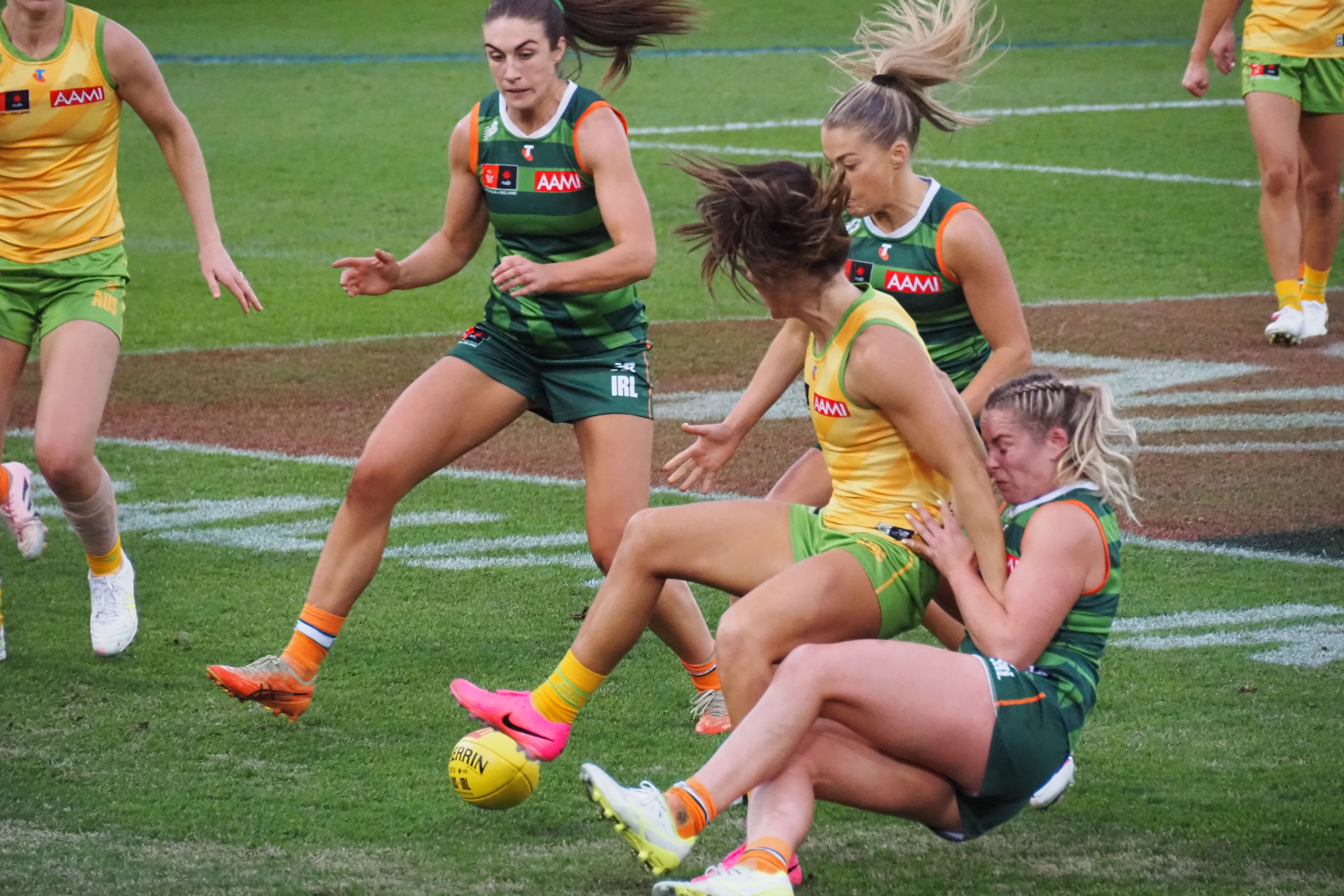
Aisling McCarthy (Ireland) tackles Kate Hore (Australia)

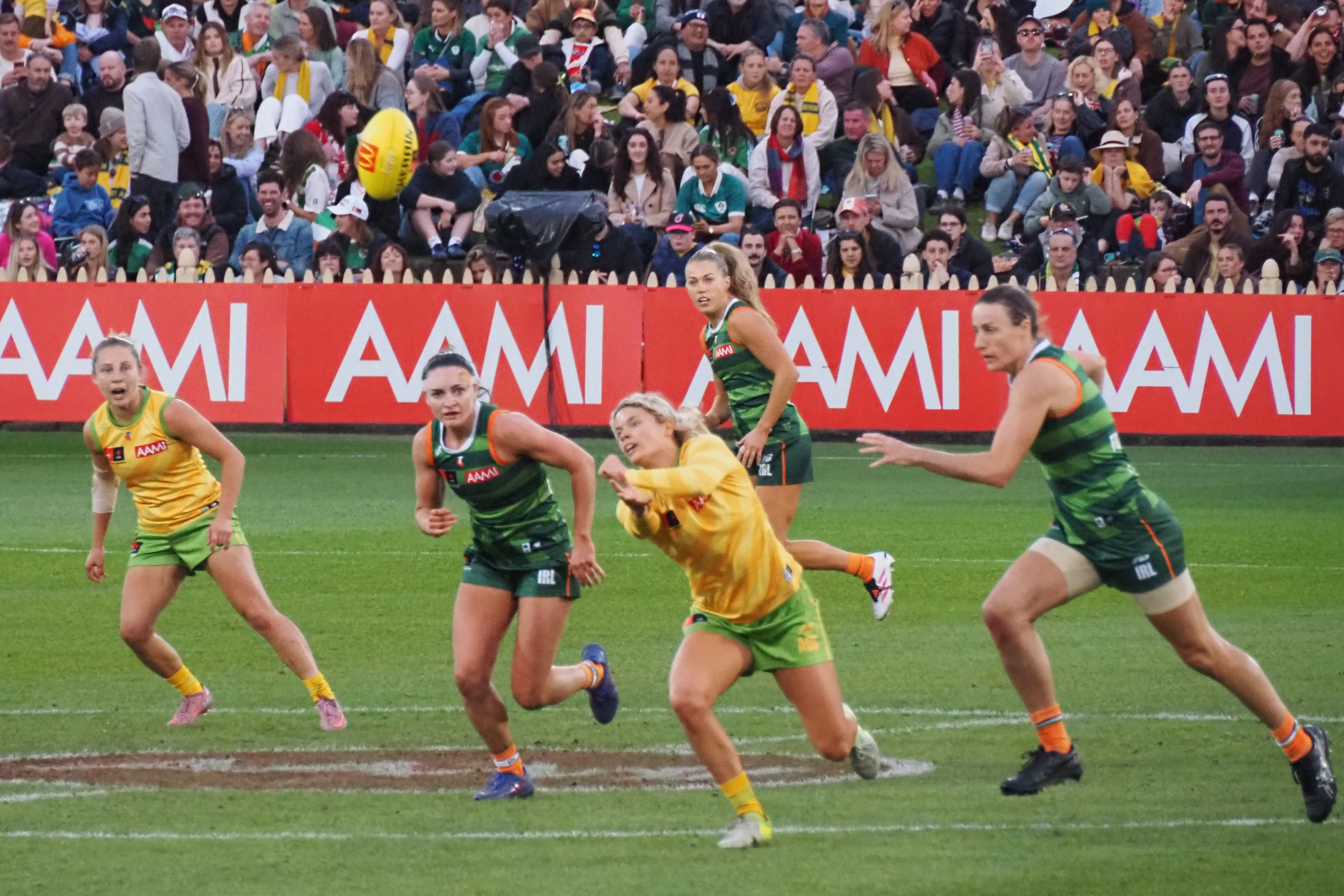
Georgie Prespakis handballs to a teammate

In front of a sell-out crowd of 9,017, Australia established an early lead following goals to Zippy Fish, Tahlia Randall, and Kate Hore. Down 19–0 on the scoreboard, Ireland responded with goals to Blaithin Bogue and Neasa Dooley, cutting the margin to 12 points at the quarter time break. Bogue's second goal at the start of the second quarter brought the Irish to within a goal, but Australia steadied scoring set-shot goals through Randall and Chloe Molloy after both marked strongly in the forward line. Midway through the second quarter, Bogue kicked her third goal of the match, and when Ireland captain Orla O'Dwyer snapped through a goal, Australia's lead was again at little as six points. Without an injured Georgie Prespakis who had left the field with an injury to her throat after a heavy blow, Australia were able to steady and then kick clear either side of half time. Randall kicked two goals to take her individual tally to four goals, while Australian captain Jasmine Garner kicked a goal and a behind. Forward Sophie Conway snapped a goal from the pocket late in the second quarter to extend Australia's lead to a match-high 31-points. Áine McDonagh left the field during the quarter with an arm injury, but would return later in the match.

Five minutes into the third quarter, Monique Conti kicked a goal, with Courtney Hodder extending Australia's lead as Ireland were restricted to just three behinds for the quarter. Australia were in control, taking a 31-point lead into the final quarter. Niamh McLaughlin kicked a spectacular goal four minutes into the final quarter of the match, finishing a move that saw Bogue cross the ball towards the goalsquare from deep in the forward pocket under pressure, McLaughlin able to get her boot to the ball to lift it over multiple Australian defenders. Commentator Kelli Underwood saying on the television broadcast that "this is Gaelic footy with a Sherrin." Further goals in the final quarter to Nina Morrison and Molloy with her second for the match, took Australia to a final score of 13.13 (91) to Ireland 6.5 (41).

With 18 disposals (nine kicks, nine handballs), three clearances and a goal, Australian captain Jasmine Garner was awarded the medal for best-on-ground. Ebony Marinoff was the leading possession player on the field with 25 (17 kicks, nine handballs), also effecting a match-high 11 tackles, while late callup Nina Morrison had 22 possessions (11 kicks, 11 handballs) and a goal. Orla O'Dwyer was Ireland's leading possession winner with 21 (13 kicks, 8 handballs). Australia's dominance through stoppages was exemplified with Mim Strom and Matilda Scholz combining for 50 hitouts, for a total of 53 compared to Ireland's 14, leading to a stoppage differential of 25 to 13 in Australia's favour.

== See also ==
- 2026 AFL Women's season
