= 2025 AFL Women's All-Australian team =

- Date: 24 November 2025

The 2025 AFL Women's All-Australian team represents the best-performed players of the 2025 AFL Women's season. The team was announced on 24 November 2025 as a complete women's Australian rules football team of 21 players.

== Selection panel ==
The selection panel for the 2025 AFL Women's All-Australian team consists of chairman Andrew Dillon, Gemma Bastiani, Jason Bennett, Laura Kane, Katie Loynes, Kate McCarthy, Erin Phillips, Eliza Reilly, Michael Whiting and Megan Waters.

== Initial squad ==
The initial 42-woman All-Australian squad was announced on 6 November 2025.

| **Bold** | Named in the final team |

| Club | Total | Player(s) |
|---|---|---|
| Adelaide | 2 | Niamh Kelly, Ebony Marinoff |
| Brisbane | 4 | Belle Dawes, **Jennifer Dunne**, Jade Ellenger, **Courtney Hodder** |
| Carlton | 3 | **Harriet Cordner**, **Dayna Finn**, Erone Fitzpatrick |
| Collingwood | 1 | Tarni White |
| Essendon | 1 | Amy Gaylor |
| Fremantle | 3 | **Gabby Newton**, Emma O'Driscoll, **Mim Strom** |
| Geelong | 3 | Mikayla Bowen, Aishling Moloney, **Georgie Prespakis** |
| Gold Coast | 1 | **Niamh McLaughlin** |
| Greater Western Sydney | 2 | Zarlie Goldsworthy, **Cambridge McCormick** |
| Hawthorn | 2 | Tilly Lucas-Rodd, **Áine McDonagh** |
| Melbourne | 3 | **Maeve Chaplin**, **Tyla Hanks**, **Kate Hore** |
| North Melbourne | 6 | Libby Birch, **Blaithin Bogue**, **Jasmine Garner**, Emma Kearney, **Tahlia Randall**, **Ash Riddell** |
| Port Adelaide | 3 | Gemma Houghton, **Matilda Scholz**, **Indy Tahau** |
| Richmond | 1 | Monique Conti |
| St Kilda | 2 | Tyanna Smith, **Serene Watson** |
| Sydney | 3 | Zippy Fish, Laura Gardiner, Montana Ham |
| West Coast | 1 | **Ella Roberts** |
| Western Bulldogs | 1 | Isabelle Pritchard |

== Final team ==
The final team was announced on 24 November 2025.

2025 AFL Women's All-Australian team
| B: | Maeve Chaplin (Melbourne) | Jennifer Dunne (Brisbane) | |
| HB: | Serene Watson (St Kilda) | Harriet Cordner (Carlton) | Cambridge McCormick (Greater Western Sydney) |
| C: | Dayna Finn (Carlton) | Tyla Hanks (Melbourne) | Ella Roberts (West Coast) |
| HF: | Kate Hore (Melbourne) (vice-captain) | Tahlia Randall (North Melbourne) | Áine McDonagh (Hawthorn) |
| F: | Courtney Hodder (Brisbane) | Indy Tahau (Port Adelaide) | |
| Foll: | Mim Strom (Fremantle) | Jasmine Garner (North Melbourne) (captain) | Ash Riddell (North Melbourne) |
| Int: | Georgie Prespakis (Geelong) | Gabby Newton (Fremantle) | Matilda Scholz (Port Adelaide) |
| Int: | Blaithin Bogue (North Melbourne) | Niamh McLaughlin (Gold Coast) | |
| Coach: | Darren Crocker (North Melbourne) | | |

Note: the position of coach in the AFL Women's All-Australian team is traditionally awarded to the coach of the premiership-winning team.
