= AFL Women's All-Australian team =

All-star team of women's Australian rules footballers

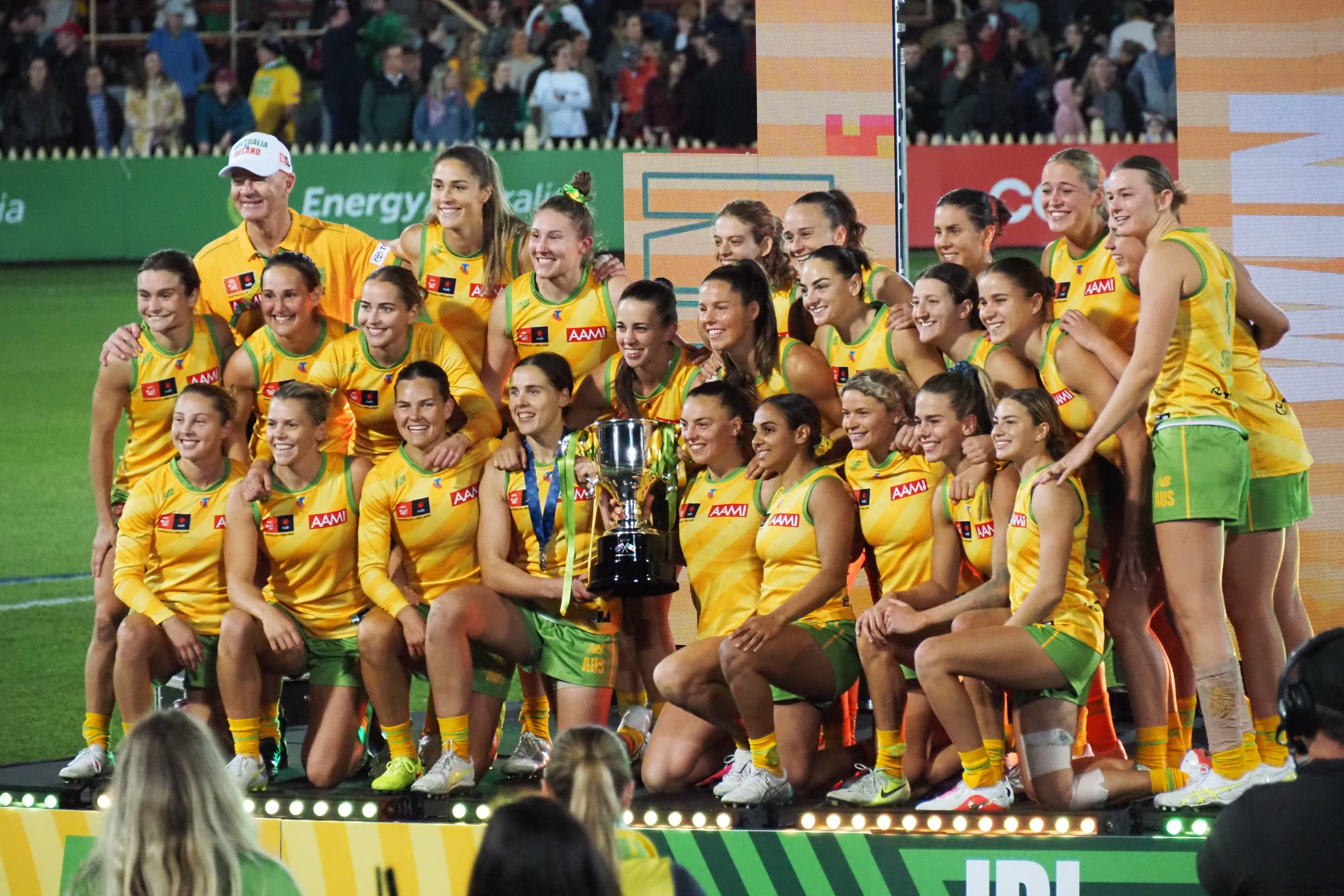
The Australian women's team won the inaugural 2026 AFL Women's Australia v Ireland match

The AFL Women's All-Australian team is an all-star team of women's Australian rules footballers playing in the AFL Women's (AFLW), selected by a panel at the end of each season. It represents a complete team, including interchange players and a coach, of the best-performed players during the home-and-away season. The team also follows the AFL's tradition of the All-Australian coach being the coach of that season's premiership-winning side, with no coach being selected in 2020 when no premiership was awarded.

Before the establishment of the AFLW, All-Australian sides were selected based on performances at AFL Women's National Championships, where players represented their states or territories. The first All-Australian team for the AFLW competition was selected in 2017 following the inaugural season.

Despite its nature, the AFL Women's All-Australian team has historically been only ceremonial in nature; as of 2025 the AFL Women's has not staged any representative matches featuring the All-Australian team. In 2026 the first representative match to feature an Australian team will be held against Ireland; players from the latter have previously been selected in the All-Australian team.

Like in the Australian Football League (AFL) with their All-Australian team since 1991 (following the Victorian Football League's conversion to a national competition), the panel chooses a complete AFLW team consisting of sixteen players and five interchange players (as opposed to eighteen players and four interchange players in the AFL), based on performances during the home-and-away season.

The 2017 team was the only AFLW team to contain 22 players, as match-day teams in the AFLW were reduced to 21 players from 2018. The AFL Women's All-Australian team was sponsored by Virgin Australia from 2017 to 2019 and by Toyota in 2020.

== Teams ==
=== AFL Women's era: 2017–present ===
==== 2017 ====
2017 AFL Women's All-Australian team
B:	Nicola Stevens (Collingwood)	Courtney Cramey (Adelaide)	
HB:	Chelsea Randall (Adelaide)	Brianna Davey (Carlton)	Karen Paxman (Melbourne)
C:	Elise O'Dea (Melbourne)	Daisy Pearce (Melbourne) (captain)	Emma Kearney (Western Bulldogs)
HF:	Erin Phillips (Adelaide) (vice-captain)	Sabrina Frederick-Traub (Brisbane)	Ellie Blackburn (Western Bulldogs)
F:	Sarah Perkins (Adelaide)	Darcy Vescio (Carlton)	
Foll:	Emma King (Collingwood)	Kara Donnellan (Fremantle)	Emily Bates (Brisbane)
Int:	Jessica Dal Pos (Greater Western Sydney)	Kate McCarthy (Brisbane)	Ebony Marinoff (Adelaide)
Int:	Tayla Harris (Brisbane)	Melissa Hickey (Melbourne)	Sam Virgo (Brisbane)
Coach:	Bec Goddard (Adelaide)		

Notes:

- Adelaide and Brisbane had five players selected in the team each, which is an equal record for most players from a club in one All-Australian team.

==== 2018 ====
2018 AFL Women's All-Australian team
B:	Chloe Molloy (Collingwood)	Kate Lutkins (Brisbane)	
HB:	Hannah Scott (Western Bulldogs)	Chelsea Randall (Adelaide) (captain)	Ebony Antonio (Fremantle)
C:	Dana Hooker (Fremantle)	Emma Kearney (Western Bulldogs)	Alicia Eva (Greater Western Sydney)
HF:	Elise O'Dea (Melbourne)	Sabrina Frederick-Traub (Brisbane)	Brooke Lochland (Western Bulldogs)
F:	Jess Wuetschner (Brisbane)	Christina Bernardi (Collingwood)	
Foll:	Erin McKinnon (Greater Western Sydney)	Courtney Gum (Greater Western Sydney)	Daisy Pearce (Melbourne) (vice-captain)
Int:	Emily Bates (Brisbane)	Tayla Harris (Carlton)	Karen Paxman (Melbourne)
Int:	Ellie Blackburn (Western Bulldogs)	Meg Downie (Melbourne)	
Coach:	Paul Groves (Western Bulldogs)		

==== 2019 ====
2019 AFL Women's All-Australian team
B:	Meg McDonald (Geelong)	Ashleigh Brazill (Collingwood)	
HB:	Jess Duffin (North Melbourne)	Chelsea Randall (Adelaide) (vice-captain)	Kerryn Harrington (Carlton)
C:	Emma Kearney (North Melbourne)	Kiara Bowers (Fremantle)	Karen Paxman (Melbourne)
HF:	Erin Phillips (Adelaide) (captain)	Jasmine Garner (North Melbourne)	Monique Conti (Western Bulldogs)
F:	Gemma Houghton (Fremantle)	Stevie-Lee Thompson (Adelaide)	
Foll:	Lauren Pearce (Melbourne)	Ebony Marinoff (Adelaide)	Maddy Prespakis (Carlton)
Int:	Emma King (North Melbourne)	Gab Pound (Carlton)	Ally Anderson (Brisbane)
Int:	Anne Hatchard (Adelaide)	Dana Hooker (Fremantle)	
Coach:	Matthew Clarke (Adelaide)		

Notes:

- Adelaide had five players selected in the team, which is an equal record for single most players from a club in one All-Australian team.

==== 2020 ====
2020 AFL Women's All-Australian team
B:	Sarah Allan (Adelaide)	Kate Lutkins (Brisbane)	
HB:	Kerryn Harrington (Carlton)	Libby Birch (Melbourne)	Isabel Huntington (Western Bulldogs)
C:	Emma Kearney (North Melbourne) (vice-captain)	Kiara Bowers (Fremantle)	Jaimee Lambert (Collingwood)
HF:	Olivia Purcell (Geelong)	Gemma Houghton (Fremantle)	Jasmine Garner (North Melbourne)
F:	Caitlin Greiser (St Kilda)	Kate Hore (Melbourne)	
Foll:	Sharni Layton (Collingwood)	Karen Paxman (Melbourne) (captain)	Maddy Prespakis (Carlton)
Int:	Kalinda Howarth (Gold Coast)	Alyce Parker (Greater Western Sydney)	Tayla Harris (Carlton)
Int:	Ash Riddell (North Melbourne)	Anne Hatchard (Adelaide)	

Notes:

- The team have no coach because no AFLW premiership was awarded in 2020.

==== 2021 ====
2021 AFL Women's All-Australian team
B:	Sarah Allan (Adelaide)	Meg McDonald (Geelong)	
HB:	Ruby Schleicher (Collingwood)	Kate Lutkins (Brisbane)	Janelle Cuthbertson (Fremantle)
C:	Monique Conti (Richmond)	Kiara Bowers (Fremantle) (vice-captain)	Georgia Patrikios (St Kilda)
HF:	Jasmine Garner (North Melbourne)	Katie Brennan (Richmond)	Ellie Blackburn (Western Bulldogs)
F:	Erin Phillips (Adelaide)	Chloe Molloy (Collingwood)	
Foll:	Breann Moody (Carlton)	Brianna Davey (Collingwood) (captain)	Alyce Parker (Greater Western Sydney)
Int:	Ebony Marinoff (Adelaide)	Darcy Vescio (Carlton)	Brittany Bonnici (Collingwood)
Int:	Karen Paxman (Melbourne)	Emma Kearney (North Melbourne)	
Coach:	Craig Starcevich (Brisbane)		

==== 2022 (S6) ====
2022 AFL Women's season 6 All-Australian team
B:	Ruby Schleicher (Collingwood)	Libby Birch (Melbourne)	
HB:	Sarah Allan (Adelaide)	Nat Grider (Brisbane)	Emma Kearney (North Melbourne) (captain)
C:	Orla O'Dwyer (Brisbane)	Emily Bates (Brisbane)	Anne Hatchard (Adelaide)
HF:	Hayley Miller (Fremantle) (vice-captain)	Katie Brennan (Richmond)	Daisy Pearce (Melbourne)
F:	Ashleigh Woodland (Adelaide)	Tayla Harris (Melbourne)	
Foll:	Lauren Pearce (Melbourne)	Ebony Marinoff (Adelaide)	Ash Riddell (North Melbourne)
Int:	Jasmine Garner (North Melbourne)	Jaimee Lambert (Collingwood)	Monique Conti (Richmond)
Int:	Kirsty Lamb (Western Bulldogs)	Kerryn Harrington (Carlton)	
Coach:	Matthew Clarke (Adelaide)		

==== 2022 (S7) ====
2022 AFL Women's season 7 All-Australian team
B:	Chelsea Biddell (Adelaide)	Breanna Koenen (Brisbane) (vice-captain)	
HB:	Eilish Sheerin (Richmond)	Katie Lynch (Western Bulldogs)	Emma Kearney (North Melbourne)
C:	Anne Hatchard (Adelaide)	Monique Conti (Richmond)	Georgie Prespakis (Geelong)
HF:	Kate Hore (Melbourne)	Jesse Wardlaw (Brisbane)	Maddy Prespakis (Essendon)
F:	Courtney Wakefield (Richmond)	Chloe Scheer (Geelong)	
Foll:	Breann Moody (Carlton)	Jasmine Garner (North Melbourne) (captain)	Ebony Marinoff (Adelaide)
Int:	Olivia Purcell (Melbourne)	Nat Grider (Brisbane)	Amy McDonald (Geelong)
Int:	Chelsea Randall (Adelaide)	Greta Bodey (Brisbane)	
Coach:	Mick Stinear (Melbourne)		

Notes:

- Despite winning the 2022 AFL Women's season 7 best and fairest award, Brisbane's Ally Anderson was not named in the team, in the only instance where this has happened to the season's best and fairest winner.

==== 2023 ====
2023 AFL Women's All-Australian team
B:	Charlotte Thomas (West Coast)	Chelsea Biddell (Adelaide)	
HB:	Emma Kearney (North Melbourne)	Emma O'Driscoll (Fremantle)	Eilish Sheerin (Richmond)
C:	Niamh Kelly (Adelaide)	Monique Conti (Richmond)	Sophie Conway (Brisbane)
HF:	Chloe Molloy (Sydney)	Bonnie Toogood (Essendon) (vice-captain)	Kate Hore (Melbourne) (captain)
F:	Dakota Davidson (Brisbane)	Danielle Ponter (Adelaide)	
Foll:	Ally Morphett (Sydney)	Jasmine Garner (North Melbourne)	Ebony Marinoff (Adelaide)
Int:	Charlie Rowbottom (Gold Coast)	Eden Zanker (Melbourne)	Ally Anderson (Brisbane)
Int:	Ash Riddell (North Melbourne)	Laura Gardiner (Sydney)	
Coach:	Craig Starcevich (Brisbane)		

Notes:

- This was the last of Emma Kearney's eight consecutive selections, a record which remains unbroken for both consecutive and total selections.

==== 2024 ====
2024 AFL Women's All-Australian team
B:	Chelsea Biddell (Adelaide)	Brenna Tarrant (Sydney)	
HB:	Tilly Lucas-Rodd (Hawthorn)	Emma O'Driscoll (Fremantle)	Maddi Gay (Essendon)
C:	Sophie Conway (Brisbane)	Ash Riddell (North Melbourne)	Ella Roberts (West Coast)
HF:	Aisling McCarthy (Fremantle)	Aishling Moloney (Geelong)	Aileen Gilroy (Hawthorn)
F:	Caitlin Gould (Adelaide)	Taylor Smith (Brisbane)	
Foll:	Mim Strom (Fremantle)	Jasmine Garner (North Melbourne) (captain)	Ebony Marinoff (Adelaide) (vice-captain)
Int:	Chelsea Randall (Adelaide)	Charlie Rowbottom (Gold Coast)	Alice O'Loughlin (North Melbourne)
Int:	Ally Anderson (Brisbane)	Belle Dawes (Brisbane)	
Coach:	Darren Crocker (North Melbourne)		

==== 2025 ====
2025 AFL Women's All-Australian team
B:	Maeve Chaplin (Melbourne)	Jennifer Dunne (Brisbane)	
HB:	Serene Watson (St Kilda)	Harriet Cordner (Carlton)	Cambridge McCormick (Greater Western Sydney)
C:	Dayna Finn (Carlton)	Tyla Hanks (Melbourne)	Ella Roberts (West Coast)
HF:	Kate Hore (Melbourne) (vice-captain)	Tahlia Randall (North Melbourne)	Áine McDonagh (Hawthorn)
F:	Courtney Hodder (Brisbane)	Indy Tahau (Port Adelaide)	
Foll:	Mim Strom (Fremantle)	Jasmine Garner (North Melbourne) (captain)	Ash Riddell (North Melbourne)
Int:	Georgie Prespakis (Geelong)	Gabby Newton (Fremantle)	Matilda Scholz (Port Adelaide)
Int:	Blaithin Bogue (North Melbourne)	Niamh McLaughlin (Gold Coast)	
Coach:	Darren Crocker (North Melbourne)		

==== Most selections ====
===== Players =====
The following players have achieved selection in at least three AFL Women's All-Australian teams.

No.	Player	Seasons
8	Jasmine Garner	2019, 2020, 2021, S6, S7 (c), 2023, 2024 (c), 2025 (c)
8	Emma Kearney	2017, 2018, 2019, 2020 (vc), 2021, S6 (c), S7, 2023
7	Ebony Marinoff	2017, 2019, 2021, S6, S7, 2023, 2024 (vc)
5	Monique Conti	2019, 2021, S6, S7, 2023
5	Paxy Paxman	2017, 2018, 2019, 2020 (c), 2021
5	Chelsea Randall	2017, 2018 (c), 2019 (vc), S7, 2024
5	Ash Riddell	2020, S6, 2023, 2024, 2025
4	Tayla Harris	2017, 2018, 2020, S6
4	Anne Hatchard	2019, 2020, S6, S7
4	Kate Hore	2020, S7, 2023 (c), 2025 (vc)
3	Sarah Allan	2020, 2021, S6
3	Ally Anderson	2019, 2023, 2024
3	Emily Bates	2017, 2018, S6
3	Chelsea Biddell	S7, 2023, 2024
3	Ellie Blackburn	2017, 2018, 2021
3	Kiara Bowers	2019, 2020, 2021 (vc)
3	Kate Lutkins	2018, 2020, 2021
3	Chloe Molloy	2018, 2021, 2023
3	Daisy Pearce	2017 (c), 2018 (vc), S6
3	Kerryn Peterson	2019, 2020, S6
3	Erin Phillips	2017 (vc), 2019 (c), 2021
3	Maddy Prespakis	2019, 2020, S7

===== Coaches =====
The following coaches have achieved selection in multiple AFL Women's All-Australian teams.

No.	Coach	Seasons
2	Matthew Clarke	2019, S6
2	Darren Crocker	2024, 2025
2	Craig Starcevich	2021, 2023

=== AFL Women's National Championship era: 1992–2013 ===
==== 2004 ====
Toni Alexandrow (ACT), Lauren Bazeley (Vic senior), Kris Britt (SA), Shannon Byrne (NT), Emily Diprose (ACT), Lauren Ebsary (SA), Sheron Ford (SA), Stephanie Foster (NSW), Emma Hender (ADF), Moana Hope (Vic senior), Meg Hutchins (Vic senior), Debbie Lee (Vic senior), Alana Lowes (ACT), Kelly McFarlane (ADF), Shannon McFerran (Vic senior), Lesley Ann McGannon (Vic senior), Natasha Medbury (NT), Elizabeth Skinner (Vic senior), Alison Smith (ACT), Jemma Still (NSW), Kerry Taylor (NSW), Megan Webster (NSW)
Coach: Greg Seton-Lonsdale (ACT)

==== 2005 ====
Mel Backhouse (ACT), Kate Burke (NT), Joanne Butland (Qld), Penny Cula-Reid (Vic under-19), Michelle Dench (Vic senior), Stephanie Foster (NSW), Moana Hope (Vic under-19), Meg Hutchins (Vic senior), Lilian Keung (Vic senior), Louise Knitter (WA), Debbie Lee (Vic senior), Alana Lowes (ACT), Shannon McFerran (Vic senior), Talei Owen (NSW), Karen Paxman (Vic under-19), Daisy Pearce (Vic under-19), Katherine Pender (Qld), Lisa Roberts (NT), Mary Ryan (SA), Elizabeth Skinner (Vic senior), Alison Smith (ACT), Natalie Wood (NT)
Coach: Rickie Dolliver (ACT)

==== 2006 ====
Lauren Arnell (Vic under-19), Michaeline Brown (NT), Joanne Butland (Qld), Penny Cula-Reid (Vic under-19), Michelle Dench (Vic senior), Nikki Harwood (WA), Emma Hender (ADF), Moana Hope (Vic under-19), Meg Hutchins (Vic senior), Kirsten Ireland (ACT), Louise Knitter (WA), Shannon McFerran (Vic senior), Janine Milne (Vic senior), Aasta O'Connor (Qld), Talei Owen (NSW), Karen Paxman (Vic under-19), Daisy Pearce (Vic under-19), Katherine Pender (Qld), Michele Reid (SA), Krystle Rivers (WA), Lauren Tesoriero (Vic senior), Jodie White (WA)
Coach: Rod Gibbsen (WA)

==== 2007 ====
Cassie Bell (NSW), Alice Broughton (ACT), Joanne Butland (Qld) (captain), Steph Chiocci (Vic under-19), Penny Cula-Reid (Vic under-19), Angela Doyle (WA), Loren Fricker (WA), Kate Goggins (ADF), Nikki Harwood (WA), Moana Hope (Vic under-19), Meg Hutchins (Vic senior), Shelley Matcham (WA), Shannon McFerran (Vic senior) (vice-captain), Anna McIlroy (Vic senior), Aasta O'Connor (Qld), Jess Openshaw (SA), Karen Paxman (Vic under-19), Daisy Pearce (Vic under-19), Jade Pregelj (Qld), Kerryn Stephens (Vic senior), Jodie White (WA), Lou Wotton (Vic senior)
Coach: Mark Muscat (Vic under-19), assistant coach: Nicole Graves (WA)

==== 2009 ====
Tess Baxter (SA), Lauren Bazeley (Vic senior), Kirby Bentley (WA), Katie Brennan (Qld), Steph Chiocci (Vic senior), Stacey Cross (Vic senior), Rebecca Hall (ACT), Nikki Harwood (WA) (vice-captain), Kristy Irvine (NT), Shelley Matcham (WA), Shannon McFerran (Vic senior) (captain), Cecilia McIntosh (Vic senior), Phoebe McWilliams (Vic senior), Aasta O'Connor (Qld), Daisy Pearce (Vic senior), Chelsea Randall (WA), Natalie Redford (NSW), Lauren Stammers (WA), Natalie Thomas (Qld), Stephanie Walding (WA), Natalie Wood (Vic senior), Lou Wotton (Vic senior)
Coach: Leeann Gill (Vic senior), assistant coach: Nicole Graves (WA)

==== 2011 ====
Lauren Arnell (Vic senior), Kirby Bentley (WA), Katie Brennan (Qld), Joanne Butland (Qld), Melissa Caulfield (WA), Steph Chiocci (Vic senior), Courtney Cramey (SA), Kara Donnellan (Vic senior), Rebecca Hall (ACT), Melissa Hickey (Vic senior), Kristy Irvine (NT), Marie Keating (NSW), Shannon McFerran (Vic senior) (captain), Roxy McGee (NSW), Aasta O'Connor (Vic senior), Elise O'Dea (ACT), Karen Paxman (Vic senior), Daisy Pearce (Vic senior), Chelsea Randall (WA), Libby Sadler (NSW), Maddison Smith (Tas), Bree White (Vic senior)
Coach: Peta Searle (Vic senior), assistant coach: Nicole Graves (WA)

==== 2013 ====
2013 women's All-Australian team
B:	Fiona Boucher (WA)	Meg Hutchins (Vic senior)	Heather Anderson (ACT)
HB:	Kara Donnellan (WA)	Kirby Bentley (WA)	Karen Paxman (Vic senior)
C:	Rheanne Lugg (WA)	Daisy Pearce (Vic senior)	Steph Chiocci (Vic senior)
HF:	Shelley Matcham (WA)	Katie Brennan (Vic senior)	Karina Demant (ACT)
F:	Aasta O'Connor (Vic senior)	Chelsea Randall (WA)	Ellie Blackburn (Vic senior)
Foll:	Lou Wotton (Vic senior)	Emma Kearney (Vic senior)	Dana Hooker (WA)
Int:	Courtney Gum (NSW)	Kate Lutkins (Qld)	Michelle Reid (SA)
Int:	Jasmine Garner (Vic senior)		

== See also ==
- All-Australian team
