= Eden Zanker =

Australian rules footballer

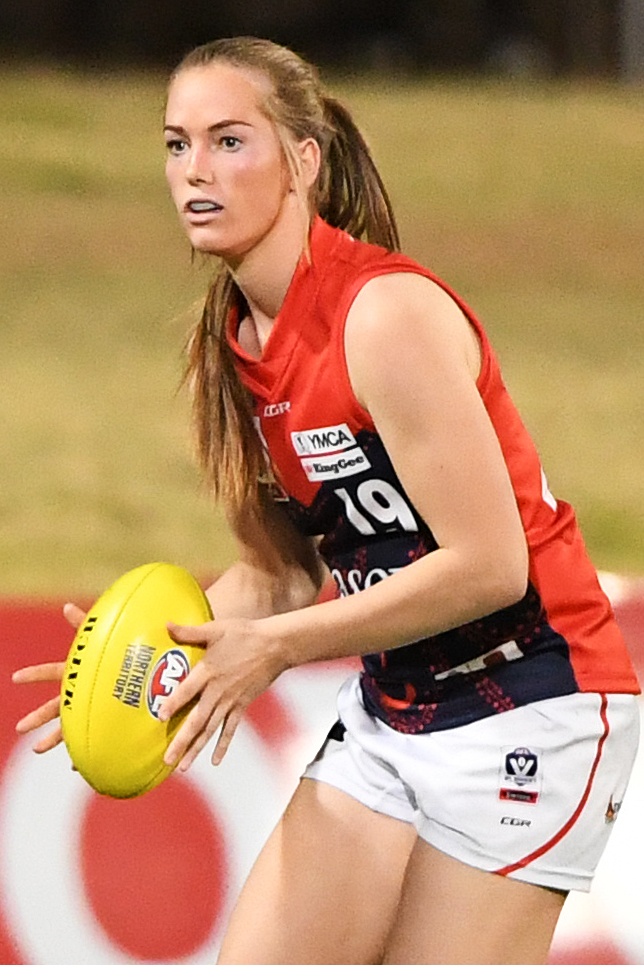
- Zanker playing for the Casey Demons in July 2019

Personal information
- Born: 11 November 1999 (age 26)
- Original team: Bendigo Pioneers (TAC Cup Girls)
- Draft: No. 6, 2017 AFL Women's draft
- Debut: Round 5, 2018, Melbourne vs. Brisbane, at Casey Fields
- Height: 183 cm (6 ft 0 in)
- Position: Forward

Club information
- Current club: Fremantle
- Number: 35

Playing career^{1}
Years	Club	Games (Goals)
2018–2025	Melbourne	86 (77)
2026–	Fremantle	12 (9)
Total		98 (86)
- ^{1} Playing statistics correct to the end of the 2026 season.

Career highlights
- AFLW premiership player: 2022 (S7); AFL Women's All-Australian team: 2023; AFL Women's leading goalkicker: 2023; Melbourne leading goalkicker: 2023

Eden Zanker (born 11 November 1999) is an Australian rules footballer playing for Fremantle in the AFL Women's competition (AFLW).

== AFLW career ==
=== Melbourne (2018–2025) ===
Zanker was drafted by Melbourne with the club's first selection and sixth pick overall in the 2017 AFL Women's draft. She made her debut in a six-point win against Brisbane at Casey Fields in round 5 of the 2018 season.

Zanker became an AFLW premiership player with the Demons during AFLW season seven in 2022. The following year she won the leading goalkicker award, finishing the home and away season with 20 goals, equal with her teammate and captain, Kate Hore. Her performances earned her a maiden selection in the All-Australian team, named on the interchange bench at the W Awards. In her final season with the Demons in 2025, she kicked 22 goals, including a five-goal, nine-mark performance against the West Coast Eagles in round 6. She completed her time at Melbourne having played 86 games and kicked 77 goals.

=== Fremantle (2026–present) ===
On 7 December 2025, Zanker was traded to the Fremantle alongside teammate Lily Johnson in a major multi-pick deal. Fremantle parted with draft picks 9, 27, 81, and a future second-round selection to secure Zanker on a four-year contract.

== Personal life ==
Zanker grew up in a farm in Natya, Victoria, near the Victoria - New South Wales border. She has worked as a plumber and groundskeeper. She now lives with her partner Nikita.
