= 2023 AFL Women's All-Australian team =

- Date: 27 November 2023
- Venue: Crown Melbourne
- Hosted by: Sarah Jones

Television/radio coverage
- Network: Fox Footy

The 2023 AFL Women's All-Australian team represents the best-performed players of the 2023 AFL Women's season. The team was announced on 27 November 2023 as a complete women's Australian rules football team of 21 players.

== Selection panel ==
The selection panel for the AFL Women's season seven All-Australian team consisted of chairwoman Nicole Livingstone, Andrew Dillon, Laura Kane, Jason Bennett, Kelli Underwood, Sarah Black, Katie Loynes, Narelle Smith and Megan Waters.

== Initial squad ==
The initial 42-woman All-Australian squad was announced on 14 November 2023. Minor premiers Adelaide had the most players selected in the initial squad with six. All 18 teams had at least one player named in the squad, the first time this has occurred.

**Bold**	Named in the final team

Club	Total	Player(s)
Adelaide	6	**Chelsea Biddell**, Caitlin Gould, Anne Hatchard, **Niamh Kelly**, **Ebony Marinoff**, **Danielle Ponter**
Brisbane	4	**Ally Anderson**, **Sophie Conway**, **Dakota Davidson**, Nat Grider
Carlton	1	Keeley Sherar
Collingwood	1	Brianna Davey
Essendon	2	Maddy Prespakis**, Bonnie Toogood**
Fremantle	2	**Emma O'Driscoll**, Mim Strom
Geelong	2	Nina Morrison, Georgie Prespakis
Gold Coast	3	Daisy D'Arcy, **Charlie Rowbottom**, Claudia Whitfort
Greater Western Sydney	2	Tarni Evans, Zarlie Goldsworthy
Hawthorn	1	Emily Bates
Melbourne	4	Tahlia Gillard, Tyla Hanks, **Kate Hore**, **Eden Zanker**
North Melbourne	4	Jasmine Ferguson, **Jasmine Garner**, **Emma Kearney**, **Ash Riddell**
Port Adelaide	2	Abbey Dowrick, Gemma Houghton
Richmond	2	**Monique Conti, Eilish Sheerin**
St Kilda	1	Jaimee Lambert
Sydney	3	**Laura Gardiner, Chloe Molloy, Ally Morphett**
West Coast	1	**Charlotte Thomas**
Western Bulldogs	1	Ellie Blackburn

== Final team ==
The final team was announced on 27 November 2023. Adelaide had the most selections with four, followed by Brisbane, North Melbourne and Sydney with three each. Ten teams were represented overall. Eleven players achieved selection for the first time, while seven players from the 2022 season 7 team were selected, with North Melbourne captain Emma Kearney achieving selection for the eighth consecutive season. Melbourne captain Kate Hore was named as All-Australian captain, while Essendon co-captain Bonnie Toogood was named as vice-captain. The three 2023 AFLW All Australian umpires were also announced, with Joel Clamp (Field Umpire), Adrian Pretorius (Boundary Umpire) and Emilie Hill (Goal Umpire) selected.

2023 AFL Women's All-Australian team
B:	Charlotte Thomas (West Coast)	Chelsea Biddell (Adelaide)	
HB:	Emma Kearney (North Melbourne)	Emma O'Driscoll (Fremantle)	Eilish Sheerin (Richmond)
C:	Niamh Kelly (Adelaide)	Monique Conti (Richmond)	Sophie Conway (Brisbane)
HF:	Chloe Molloy (Sydney)	Bonnie Toogood (Essendon) (vice-captain)	Kate Hore (Melbourne) (captain)
F:	Dakota Davidson (Brisbane)	Danielle Ponter (Adelaide)	
Foll:	Ally Morphett (Sydney)	Jasmine Garner (North Melbourne)	Ebony Marinoff (Adelaide)
Int:	Charlie Rowbottom (Gold Coast)	Eden Zanker (Melbourne)	Ally Anderson (Brisbane)
Int:	Ash Riddell (North Melbourne)	Laura Gardiner (Sydney)	
Coach:	Craig Starcevich (Brisbane)		

Note: the position of coach in the AFL Women's All-Australian team is traditionally awarded to the coach of the premiership-winning team.
