= Dakota Davidson =

Australian rules footballer

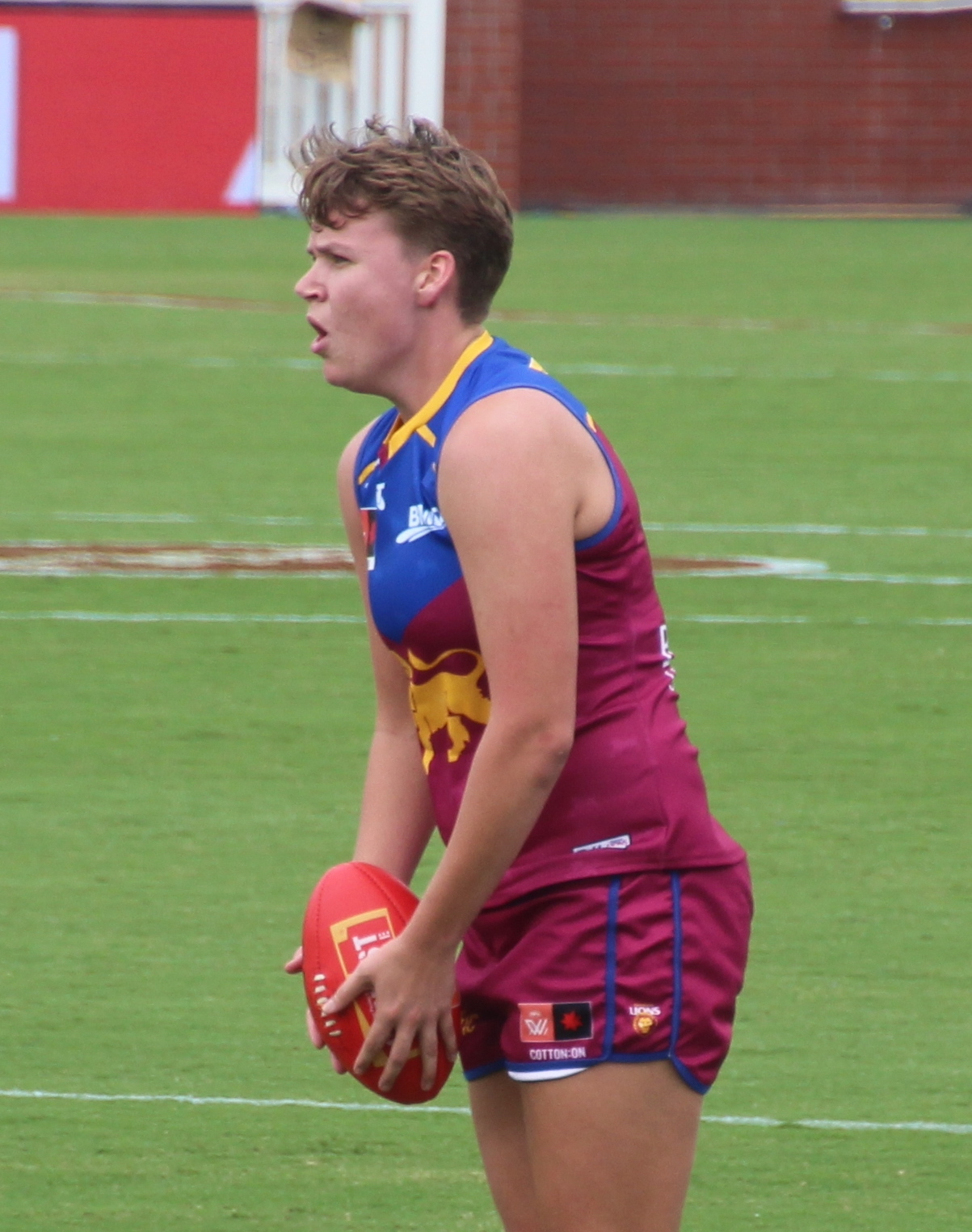
- Davidson lining up to kick the first goal of the 2022 season 7 Grand Final

Personal information
- Full name: Dakota Ann-Marie Davidson
- Born: 31 December 1998 (age 27); Ipswich, Queensland
- Original team: University of Queensland (QAFLW)
- Draft: No. 60, 2019 AFL Women's draft
- Debut: Round 1, 2020, Brisbane vs. Adelaide, at Hickey Park
- Height: 180 cm (5 ft 11 in)
- Position: Forward/Ruck

Club information
- Current club: Brisbane
- Number: 14

Playing career^{1}
Years	Club	Games (Goals)
2020–	Brisbane	51 (55)
- ^{1} Playing statistics correct to the end of 2023.

Career highlights
- 2× AFLW premiership player: 2021, 2023; AFL Women's All-Australian team: 2023; 2× Brisbane leading goalkicker: 2021, 2023

Dakota Ann-Marie Davidson (born 31 December 1998) is an Australian rules footballer playing for Brisbane in the AFL Women's competition (AFLW).

== Early life ==
Davidson was born in Ipswich, Queensland to a family of Indigenous Australian descent (Gunditjmara). Dakota was raised near Limestone Park in central Ipswich and spent much of her youth playing sport on the local fields there. Dakota attended Ipswich Girls' Grammar School throughout her upbringing. She began playing Australian rules at the age of 18 encouraged by her father who was familiar with the sport having moved from western Victoria at a young age. The club Dakota first played for was University of Queensland in the AFL Queensland Women's League. After 3 season in the league Dakota was identified as a talented forward/ruck by the Brisbane Lions having kicked 11 goals in 11 games and was selected to play in 2 games in the AFL Queensland QW Winter Series in the run up to the national draft.

Dakota was drafted by Brisbane with the 60th pick in the 2019 AFL Women's draft.

== AFLW career ==
Davidson made her debut in the Lions' round 1 game against Adelaide at Hickey Park on 8 February 2020. She had her best game for the 2021 AFL Women's season in the Lions' round two 63 point victory over Gold Coast, where she kicked 4 goals. She starred in the Lions' 2021 preliminary final win over Collingwood with a three-goal performance to help her team qualify for the 2021 AFL Women's Grand Final. Davidson signed on with Brisbane for two more years on 15 June 2021.

=== Statistics ===
Statistics are correct to the end of the 2021 season.

Legend
G	Goals	K	Kicks	D	Disposals	T	Tackles
B	Behinds	H	Handballs	M	Marks

Season	Team	No.	Games	Totals							Averages (per game)							Votes
Season	Team	No.	Games	G	B	K	H	D	M	T	G	B	K	H	D	M	T	Votes
2020	Brisbane	14	6	2	3	27	7	34	11	13	0.3	0.5	4.5	1.2	5.7	1.8	2.2	0
2021^{#}	Brisbane	14	11	16^{‡}	5	69	14	83	32	27	1.5	0.5	6.3	1.3	7.5	2.9	2.5	
Career			17	18	8	96	21	117	43	40	1.1	0.5	5.6	1.2	6.9	2.5	2.4	0
