= Erone Fitzpatrick =

Personal information
- Full name: Erone Fitzpatrick
- Born: 17 August 2000 (age 26)
- Height: 165 cm (5 ft 5 in)
- Position: Midfielder

Playing career^{1}
Years	Club	Games (Goals)
2023–	Carlton	25 (19)

International team honours^{2}
Years	Team	Games (Goals)
2026	Ireland	1 (0)
- ^{1} Playing statistics correct to the end of the 2025 season.^{2} Representative statistics correct as of 2026.

Career highlights
- Ireland AFLW team: 2026; Carlton rookie of the year: 2023

Erone Fitzpatrick (born 17 August 2000) is an Irish Australian rules footballer playing for the Carlton Football Club in the AFL Women's (AFLW). She is a dual-code sportsperson, having played Gaelic football at senior level for her home county team Laois.

== Gaelic football career ==
Before joining the AFLW, Fitzpatrick was a Gaelic footballer in Ireland. She played her club-level football for Park–Ratheniska GAA and was named Intermediate player of the year in Laois after being part of the team that promoted the club to the senior grade of Laois football. She played for the Laois county team and was regarded as one of the county's leading players, earning selection in the Ladies Football Team of the League in 2017 and 2021 and being named Leinster Player of the Year in 2018.

Fitzpatrick was a member of the Laois team that won the 2022 All-Ireland Intermediate Ladies' Football Championship, scoring three points in the final against Wexford. In addition to Gaelic football, she also played basketball, soccer and camogie before being recruited by Carlton ahead of the 2023 AFLW season.

== Australian rules football career ==
Fitzpatrick was recruited by Carlton as an Irish rookie ahead of the 2023 AFLW season. She made her AFLW debut in the opening round of the season and went on to play all 10 matches for Carlton, averaging 12.1 disposals and 4.2 tackles per game. Her debut season ended prematurely when she ruptured her anterior cruciate ligament in Carlton's final-round match against St Kilda.

As a result of the injury, Fitzpatrick was placed on Carlton's inactive list for the 2024 AFLW season while she completed her rehabilitation. She returned to football in 2025, earning selection in the preliminary squad for the All-Australian team and establishing herself as one of Carlton's leading midfielders. She was named in the club's leadership group ahead of the 2026 season and was also named in the Ireland representative team that competed in the 2026 Australia v Ireland match.
