= Niamh McLaughlin =

Irish footballer (born 1993)

Personal information
- Born: 31 August 1993 (age 33)
- Original teams: County Donegal (LGFA); Moville (Donegal GAA)
- Debut: Round 1, 2023, Gold Coast vs. Carlton, at Princes Park
- Height: 157 cm (5 ft 2 in)
- Position: Medium defender

Club information
- Current club: Gold Coast
- Number: 11

Playing career^{1}
Years	Club	Games (Goals)
2023–	Gold Coast	33 (6)

International team honours^{2}
Years	Team	Games (Goals)
2026	Ireland	1 (1)
- ^{1} Playing statistics correct to the end of 2025.^{2} Representative statistics correct as of 2026.

Career highlights
- All-Australian: 2025; Gold Coast co-captain: 2025–

Niamh McLaughlin (born 31 August 1993) is an Australian rules footballer who plays for the Gold Coast Suns in the AFL Women's (AFLW). A tri-code athlete, she has previously played Gaelic football for County Donegal in the Ladies' Gaelic Football Association as well as association football in her younger years.

== LGFA career ==
McLaughlin captained County Donegal. In 2022, she helped Donegal to the semi finals of the 2022 All-Ireland Senior Ladies' Football Championship and runners-up of the 2022 Ladies' National Football League.

In 2022, she received her first Ladies' All Star Award. She is also a three-time Irish News Ulster GAA All-Star, and in 2022 won the LGFA Footballer of the Year.

== AFL Women's career ==
McLaughlin was signed by the Gold Coast Suns in the AFL Women's in March 2023. She made her debut for the club in round one of the 2023 AFL Women's season against Carlton, and helped the club qualify for an elimination final. In 2024, she was the runner-up in Gold Coast's Club Champion award.

Ahead of the 2025 season, she made history as the first Irish captain of a professional Australian rules football club, being named co-captain alongside Lucy Single. In 2025, the Suns finished last to win the wooden spoon, but McLaughlin was named in the All-Australian team for the first time. She was also named in the Irish representative squad to take on Australia in the 2026 AFL Women's Australia v Ireland match prior to the 2026 season.
