= Lou Wotton =

Australian rules footballer (born 1983)

Personal information
- Full name: Louise Wotton
- Born: 8 November 1983 (age 42)
- Original team: Eastern Devils (VFLW)
- Draft: 2016 free agent: Collingwood
- Debut: Round 2, 2017, Collingwood vs. Melbourne, at IKON Park
- Height: 178 cm (5 ft 10 in)
- Position: Ruck

Playing career^{1}
Years	Club	Games (Goals)
2017	Collingwood	3 (0)
- ^{1} Playing statistics correct to the end of the 2017 season.

Louise Wotton (born 8 November 1983) is an Australian rules footballer who played for the Collingwood Football Club in the AFL Women's (AFLW).

== Early life and state football ==
Wotton played 13 seasons with the VWFL. She won four best and fairest awards at the Eastern Devils, the Helen Lambert medal twice, represented Victoria, was selected twice for the All-Australian team and played for Melbourne in the 2013 and 2014 exhibition matches. In 2014, she announced her retirement from football and took up triathlon training, wanting to compete in the Ironman Triathlon.

In September 2016, Wotton came out of retirement to nominate for the inaugural AFLW draft.

== AFL Women's career ==
After not being selected in the draft, Wotton was signed by Collingwood as a free agent. She made her debut in round 2, 2017, in a match at IKON Park against Melbourne.

Wotton was delisted by Collingwood ahead of the 2018 season.

== Personal life ==
Apart from her sports career, Wotton works as a physical education and health teacher at Rowville Secondary College.

== Statistics ==
Statistics are correct to the end of the 2017 season.

Legend
G	Goals	K	Kicks	D	Disposals	T	Tackles
B	Behinds	H	Handballs	M	Marks

Season	Team	No.	Games	Totals							Averages (per game)						
Season	Team	No.	Games	G	B	K	H	D	M	T	G	B	K	H	D	M	T
2017	Collingwood	19	3	0	0	2	2	4	1	5	0.0	0.0	0.7	0.7	1.3	0.3	1.7
Career			3	0	0	2	2	4	1	5	0.0	0.0	0.7	0.7	1.3	0.3	1.7
