= Ella Roberts =

Australian rules footballer

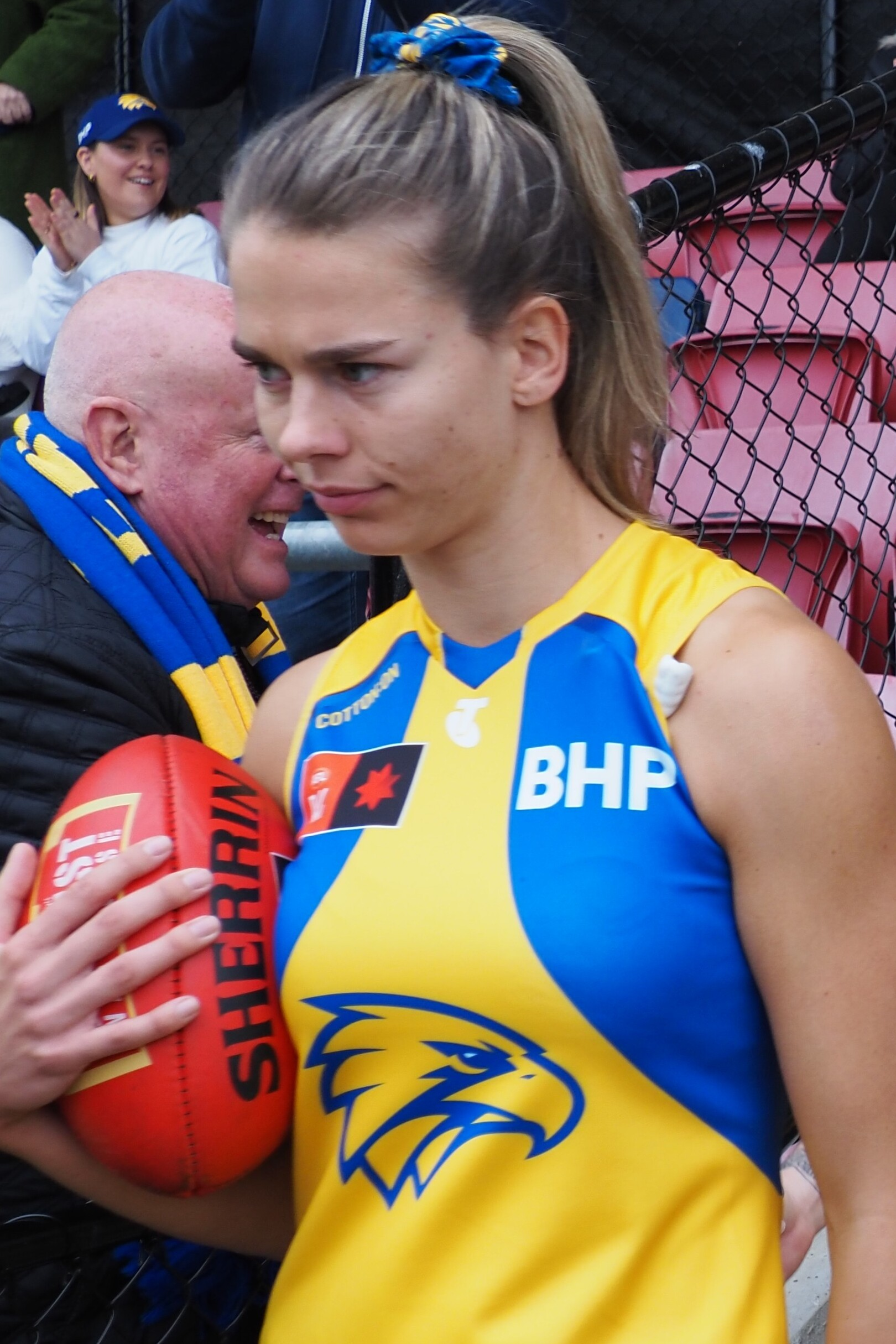
- Roberts pre-match with West Coast in 2025

Personal information
- Full name: Ella Roberts
- Born: 17 December 2004 (age 21)
- Original team: Peel Thunder (WAFLW)
- Draft: No. 14, 2022 national draft
- Debut: Round 1, S7, West Coast vs. Port Adelaide, at Mineral Resources Park
- Height: 176 cm (5 ft 9 in)
- Position: Midfielder

Club information
- Current club: West Coast
- Number: 4

Playing career^{1}
Years	Club	Games (Goals)
2022 (S7)–	West Coast	51 (20)
- ^{1} Playing statistics correct to the end of round 8, 2026.

Career highlights
- 2× AFL Women's All-Australian team: 2024, 2025; 3× West Coast Club Champion: 2024, 2025, 2026; 2× Derby Medal: 2023, 2026; AFL Women's Rising Star nominee: S7

Ella Roberts is an Australian rules footballer playing for the West Coast Eagles in the AFL Women's (AFLW). She was nominated for the AFL Women's Rising Star award in round 6 of season 7 and is a dual Derby Medallist, the first and only West Coast player to win the award. Roberts is a dual AFL Women's All-Australian and dual West Coast Club Champion.

== Early life ==
Roberts grew up supporting the Fremantle Football Club. She is a cousin of Greater Western Sydney AFL player Joe Fonti.

Roberts played in a premiership with WAFL Women's (WAFLW) club Peel Thunder, kicking two goals in the grand final, and was named the most valuable player at the 2021 AFL Women's Under-19 Championships.

== AFL Women's career ==
Roberts was recruited by the Eagles with the 14th pick in the 2022 AFL Women's draft. Despite being drafted for her key forward prowess, Roberts was played primarily as a midfielder in her debut season, debuting for the Eagles in the opening round of season seven. Roberts earned a rising star nomination in round 6 after she collected 15 disposals, a goal and 4 marks in a narrow loss to Hawthorn.

== Statistics ==
Updated to the end of the 2025 season.

Legend
G	Goals	K	Kicks	D	Disposals	T	Tackles
B	Behinds	H	Handballs	M	Marks

Season	Team	No.	Games	Totals							Averages (per game)							Votes
Season	Team	No.	Games	G	B	K	H	D	M	T	G	B	K	H	D	M	T	Votes
2022 (S7)	West Coast	4	10	2	2	74	60	134	35	29	0.2	0.2	7.4	6.0	13.4	3.5	2.9	1
2023	West Coast	4	10	2	9	113	96	209	47	39	0.2	0.9	11.3	9.6	20.9	4.7	3.9	8
2024	West Coast	4	11	6	9	136	99	235	49	61	0.5	0.8	12.4	9.0	21.4	4.5	5.5	12
2025	West Coast	4	12	8	13	146	140	286	46	88	0.7	1.1	12.2	11.7	23.8	3.8	7.3	17
Career			43	18	33	469	385	864	177	217	0.4	0.8	10.9	9.2	20.1	4.1	5.0	38

== Honours and achievements ==
- 2× AFL Women's All-Australian team: 2024, 2025
- 3× West Coast Club Champion: 2024, 2025, 2026
- 2× Derby Medal: 2023, 2026
- AFL Women's Rising Star nominee: S7
