= Bláithín Bogue =

Irish footballer (born 2000)

Personal information
- Born: 26 July 2000 (age 26); County Fermanagh, Northern Ireland
- Original team: Fermanagh (LGFA)
- Debut: Round 1, 2025, North Melbourne vs. Geelong, at Kardinia Park
- Height: 176 cm (5 ft 9 in)
- Position: Forward

Club information
- Current club: North Melbourne
- Number: 10

Playing career^{1}
Years	Club	Games (Goals)
2025–	North Melbourne	15 (25)

International team honours^{2}
Years	Team	Games (Goals)
2026	Ireland	1 (3)
- ^{1} Playing statistics correct to the end of 2025.^{2} Representative statistics correct as of 2026.

Career highlights
- AFL Women's premiership player: 2025; AFL Women's All-Australian team: 2025; North Melbourne leading goalkicker: 2025

Bláithín Bogue (born 26 July 2000) is an Irish Australian rules footballer who plays for North Melbourne in the AFL Women's (AFLW) and a gaelic footballer for Fermanagh GAA in the Ladies Gaelic Football Association (LGFA).

== Gaelic football career ==
Bogue is originally a Fermanagh GAA player, who was a member of the team that won the 2020 All-Ireland Junior Ladies' Football Championship. She continues to represent her home county during the AFL Women's off-seasons.

== Australian football career ==
Recruited to North Melbourne in 2023, she played her first match North Melbourne in round one against Geelong in the 2025 AFL Women's season, and was selected in the All-Australian team for that year. She also led the eventual premiers in goalkicking, finding such form that teammate Emma King was kept out of the undefeated North Melbourne team for a portion of the 2026 season. Following a three-goal performance in the preliminary final against Melbourne, Bogue became a premiership player in her debut season when the Kangaroos defeated Brisbane in the 2025 Grand Final.
