= Dayna Finn =

Personal information
- Full name: Dayna Finn
- Born: 2 September 2000 (age 26)
- Height: 176 cm (5 ft 9 in)
- Position: Midfielder

Playing career^{1}
Years	Club	Games (Goals)
2023–	Carlton	30 (11)

International team honours^{2}
Years	Team	Games (Goals)
2026	Ireland	1 (0)
- ^{1} Playing statistics correct to the end of the 2025 season.^{2} Representative statistics correct as of 2026.

Career highlights
- AFL Women's All-Australian Team: 2025; Carlton best and fairest (AFL Women's): 2025

Dayna Finn (born 2 September 2000) is an Irish Australian rules footballer playing for the Carlton Football Club in the AFL Women's (AFLW). She is also a former basketballer and Gaelic footballer.

== Early career ==
Finn played Gaelic football for Mayo. She also represented Ireland in basketball, playing for the senior team in the 2021 FIBA Women's European Championship for Small Countries and the EuroBasket Women 2023 qualification. In 2023, she was named the Women's Standout Irish Player of the Year at the BIW Fan Awards 2023.

== AFL Women's career ==
Finn joined the Carlton Football Club during 2023. She made her debut in round 5 of the 2023 AFLW season.

At the end of the 2025 AFLW season, Finn was named in the 2025 AFL Women's All-Australian team. She also won Carlton's best and fairest for 2025.

== Personal life ==
Finn is originally from Kiltimagh. Her parents both played Gaelic football with Mayo, her sister, Hazel, also plays basketball for Ireland and played Gaelic football for the Mayo minors. Her brother, Cillian, plays Gaelic football for Kiltimagh GAA club.
