= Chelsea Biddell =

Australian rules footballer

Personal information
- Born: 15 July 1998 (age 28)
- Original team: West Adelaide (SANFLW)
- Draft: No. 102, 2019 national draft
- Debut: Round 1, 2020, Adelaide vs. Brisbane, at Hickey Park
- Height: 178 cm (5 ft 10 in)
- Position: Forward

Club information
- Current club: Adelaide
- Number: 12

Playing career^{1}
Years	Club	Games (Goals)
2020–	Adelaide	48 (4)
- ^{1} Playing statistics correct to the end of 2023.

Career highlights
- AFL Women's premiership player: 2022 (S6); 3× AFL Women's All-Australian team: 2022 (S7), 2023, 2024

Chelsea Biddell (born 15 July 1998) is an Australian rules footballer who plays for Adelaide in the AFL Women's (AFLW).

== Early life ==
Biddell grew up in Adelaide, Australia and was schoolmates with future Crows teammate Rachelle Martin. She didn't play football until the age of 18 when she had a trial session at West Adelaide.

== AFL Women's career ==
Drafted from West Adelaide in the 2019 draft, Biddell was a key forward in her youth. She was moved from the forward line into defence in 2022 and became a part of Adelaide's premiership-winning backline that year. The following season, Biddell earned her first All-Australian selection.

Biddell played her 50th game in the round two win against Fremantle in 2024. Following a third consecutive preliminary-final exit for Adelaide, Biddell was named in her third All-Australian team alongside three teammates.
