= Orla O'Dwyer =

Irish Australian rules footballer (born 1998)

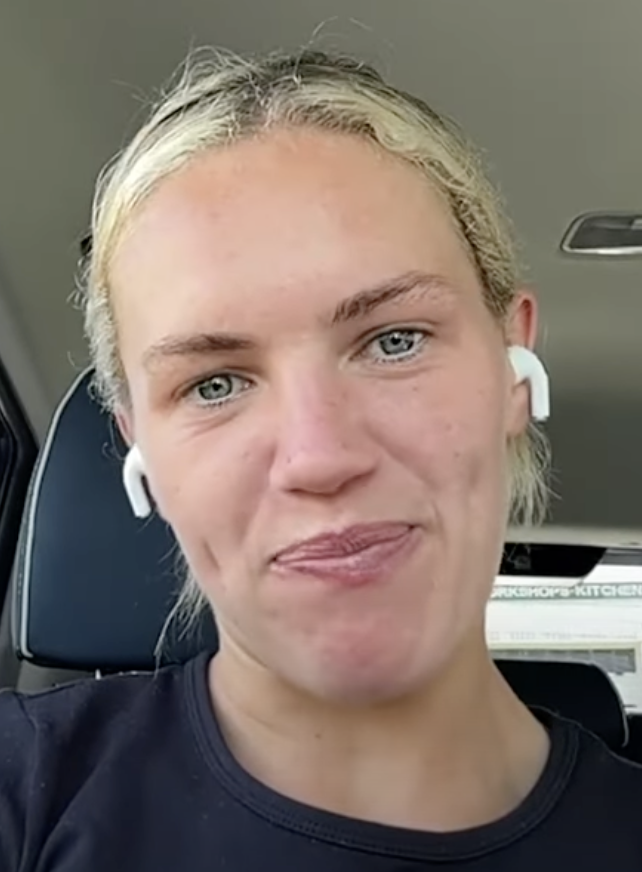
- O'Dwyer in 2024

Personal information
- Born: 15 July 1998 (age 28); Sydney, Australia
- Original team: Tipperary (Camogie/ladies' Gaelic football)
- Draft: 2019 rookie signing
- Debut: Round 1, 2020, Brisbane vs. Adelaide, at Hickey Park
- Height: 175 cm (5 ft 9 in)
- Position: Forward

Club information
- Current club: Brisbane
- Number: 9

Playing career^{1}
Years	Club	Games (Goals)
2020–	Brisbane	94 (40)

International team honours^{2}
Years	Team	Games (Goals)
2026	Ireland	1 (1)
- ^{1} Playing statistics correct to the end of 2026.^{2} Representative statistics correct as of 2026.

Career highlights
- AFLW premiership player: 2021, 2023; AFL Women's All-Australian team: 2022 (S6); Brisbane best and fairest: 2026

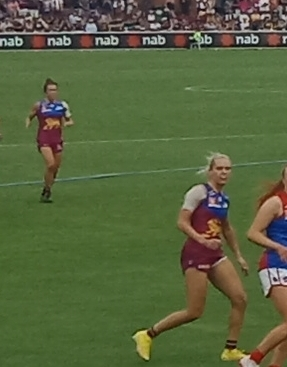
Orla O'Dwyer

Orla O'Dwyer (born 15 July 1998) is an Irish Australian rules footballer who plays for the Brisbane in the AFL Women's competition (AFLW).

== Early life ==
O'Dwyer was born in Sydney, Australia where her parents stayed for 4 years until they moved Orla to Ireland at the age of 1 and raised in Killenaule in County Tipperary. At school she participated in soccer, basketball and cross country running.

As a junior between under 8 and under 12 she played in the boys Gaelic Football competition before switching to women's football at the age of 12. Orla played open age camogie and ladies' Gaelic football, representing Tipperary GAA in both and captaining in the former.

Intending to use her Australian citizenship as a means to return to her country of birth, O'Dwyer signed up for the Crosscoders program which identified talented athletes to try out for professional clubs in Australia and signed by the Brisbane Lions as an other sport rookie 2019.

== AFL Women's career ==
O'Dwyer made her AFLW debut in the Lions' round 1 game against Adelaide at Hickey Park on 8 February 2020. She was named as the Irish Times/Sport Ireland Sportswoman for April 2021. O'Dwyer had a breakout 2022 season 6 and was named in the All-Australian honorary team at the end of the season, the first Irishwoman in the competition's history to achieve the feat.
