= Emma O'Driscoll (footballer) =

Australian rules footballer

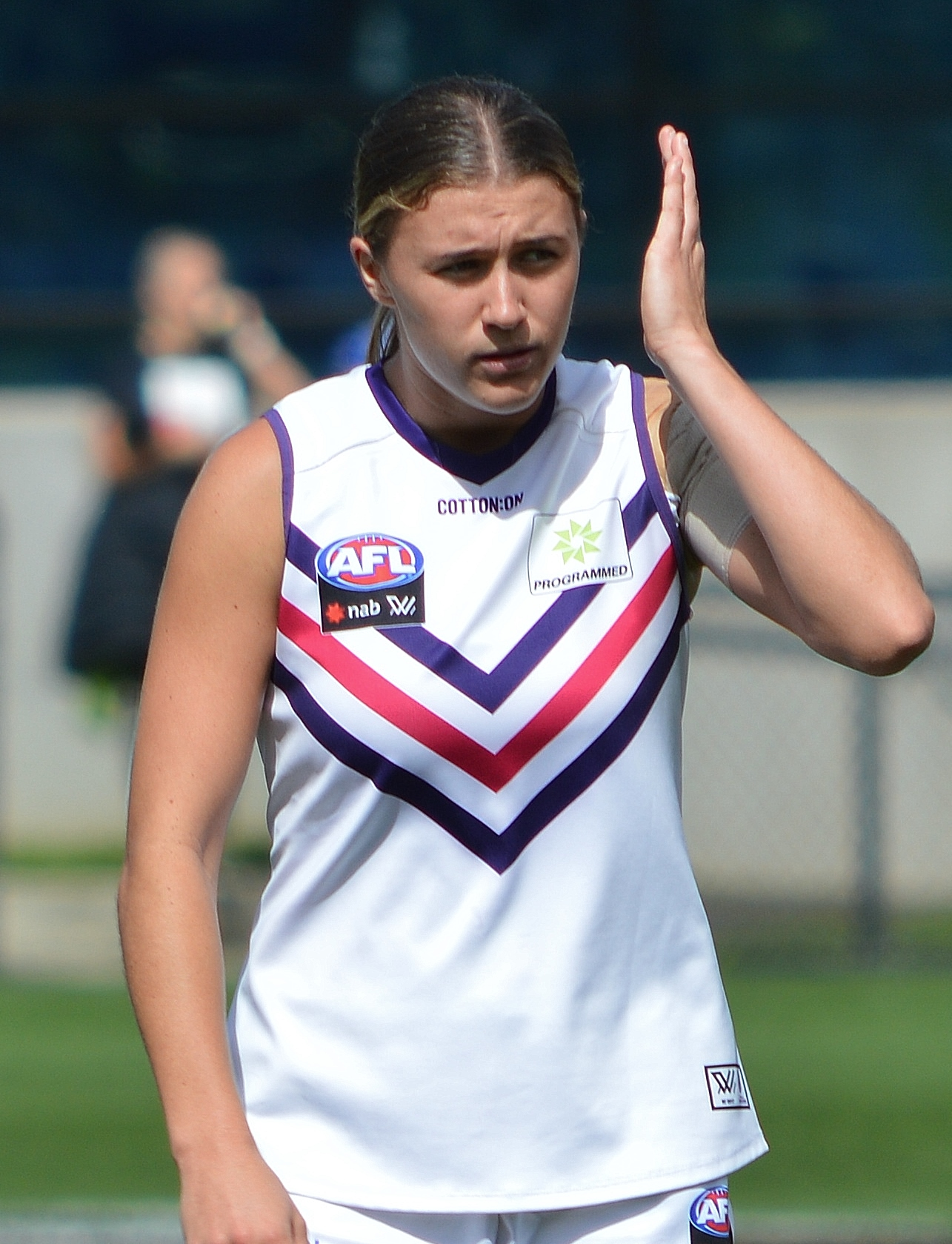
- O'Driscoll with Fremantle in March 2021

Personal information
- Full name: Emma Katelyn O'Driscoll
- Born: 22 April 2000 (age 26)
- Original team: Swan Districts (WAWFL)
- Draft: No. 51, 2019 AFL Women's draft
- Debut: Round 4, 2020, Fremantle vs. St Kilda, at RSEA Safety Park
- Height: 172 cm (5 ft 8 in)
- Position: Key defender

Club information
- Current club: Fremantle
- Number: 3

Playing career^{1}
Years	Club	Games (Goals)
2020–	Fremantle	75 (1)
- ^{1} Playing statistics correct to the end of the 2026 season.

Career highlights
- 3× 22under22 team: 2021, 2022 (S6), 2022 (S7); 2× AFL Women's All-Australian team: 2023, 2024

Emma Katelyn O'Driscoll (born 22 April 2000) is an Australian rules footballer playing for the Fremantle Football Club in the AFL Women's (AFLW).

== AFLW career ==
O'Driscoll was drafted by Fremantle with their fourth selection, 51st overall, in the 2019 AFL Women's draft after playing for Swan Districts in the West Australian Women's Football League (WAWFL).

O'Driscoll was named in the 22under22 team during both the 2021 season and 2022 season 6. O'Driscoll was again named in the 22under22 team for her third consecutive season, following 2022 season 7.

O'Driscoll had a career-best performance in Round 6 of the 2023 AFL Women's season against North Melbourne, collecting 28 disposals, 14 contested possessions and 15 intercept possessions. She was named at centre half-back of the 2023 AFL Women's All-Australian team at the season's end, and finished runner-up in Fremantle's fairest and best award. O'Driscoll was also the league leader in intercept possessions, totaling 85 across 10 rounds.

O'Driscoll was elevated to Fremantle's leadership group ahead of the 2024 AFL Women's season. She was named at centre half-back of the 2024 AFL Women's All-Australian team at the season's end. O'Driscoll once again led the competition for intercept possessions, with 94 across 11 games. In June 2026, O'Driscoll was appointed deputy vice-captain of Fremantle.

== Personal life ==
O'Driscoll grew up in Northam, Western Australia. Both her brothers are Australian rules footballers; her younger brother Nathan was also drafted by Fremantle with the 27th selection in the 2020 AFL draft, and her youngest brother, Aiden, was drafted to the Western Bulldogs for the 2024 AFL season, but medically retired on 14 May 2024 without playing a game after suffering a head injury during the pre-season.

== Statistics ==
Updated to the end of the 2025 season.

Legend
G	Goals	K	Kicks	D	Disposals	T	Tackles
B	Behinds	H	Handballs	M	Marks

Season	Team	No.	Games	Totals							Averages (per game)							Votes
Season	Team	No.	Games	G	B	K	H	D	M	T	G	B	K	H	D	M	T	Votes
2020	Fremantle	3	4	0	0	21	8	29	10	5	0.0	0.0	5.3	2.0	7.3	2.5	1.3	0
2021	Fremantle	3	10	0	2	42	28	70	8	18	0.0	0.2	4.2	2.8	7.0	0.8	1.8	0
2022 (S6)	Fremantle	3	11	1	1	74	25	99	33	27	0.1	0.1	6.7	2.3	9.0	3.0	2.5	0
2022 (S7)	Fremantle	3	10	0	2	75	37	112	22	30	0.0	0.2	7.5	3.7	11.2	2.2	3.0	0
2023	Fremantle	3	10	0	0	110	61	171	31	31	0.0	0.0	11.0	6.1	17.1	3.1	3.1	2
2024	Fremantle	3	13	0	0	133	75	208	49	30	0.0	0.0	10.2	5.8	16.0	3.8	2.3	3
2025	Fremantle	3	11	0	0	104	64	168	40	38	0.0	0.0	9.5	5.8	15.3	3.6	3.5	3
Career			69	1	5	559	298	857	193	179	0.0	0.1	8.1	4.3	12.4	2.8	2.6	8
