= Jasmine Garner =

Australian rules footballer (born 1994)

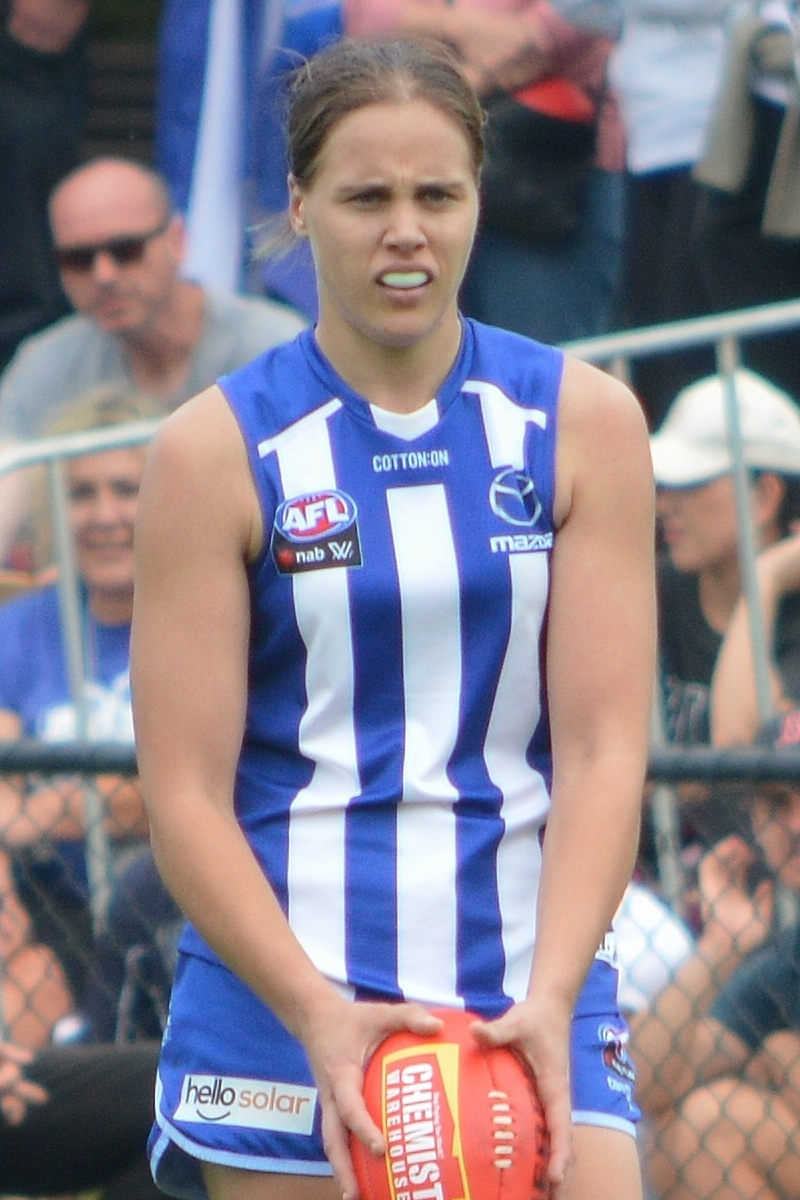
- Garner with North Melbourne in March 2021

Personal information
- Full name: Jasmine Garner
- Born: 8 July 1994 (age 32)
- Original team: St Kilda Sharks (VFLW)
- Draft: No. 86, 2016 national draft
- Debut: Round 1, 2017, Collingwood vs. Carlton, at IKON Park
- Height: 175 cm (5 ft 9 in)
- Weight: 75 kg (165 lb)
- Positions: Key forward, ruck rover

Club information
- Current club: North Melbourne
- Number: 25

Playing career^{1}
Years	Club	Games (Goals)
2017–2018	Collingwood	14 (10)
2019–	North Melbourne	89 (89)
Total		103 (99)

Representative team honours^{2}
Years	Team	Games (Goals)
2017	Victoria	1 (5)
2026	Australia	1 (1)
- ^{1} Playing statistics correct to the end of 2025 season.^{2} Representative statistics correct as of 2026.

Career highlights
- 2x AFLW premiership player: 2024, 2025 (c); North Melbourne captain: 2025-; 8× AFLW All-Australian team: 2019, 2020, 2021, 2022 (S6), 2022 (S7), 2023, 2024 (c), 2025 (c); 3× AFLPA Most Valuable Player: 2020, 2023, 2025; 3× AFLCA Champion Player of the Year: 2020, 2022 (S7), 2023; 4× North Melbourne best and fairest: 2020, 2021, 2022 (S7), 2023; 2× North Melbourne leading goalkicker: 2021, 2022 (S6)

Jasmine Garner (born 8 July 1994) is an Australian rules footballer with North Melbourne in the AFL Women's (AFLW) competition. Garner scored the AFLW's first-ever goal while playing for Collingwood in the league's inaugural match in 2017.

== Early life ==
Garner grew up supporting the Carlton Football Club, and Anthony Koutoufides was her favourite player. She started playing local football at the Yarraville Football Club at the age of eight, but later went through a stage of "not really enjoying playing footy anymore".

Inspired by the women's exhibition games that took place in the years prior to the conception of the AFL Women's competition, Garner juggled local football with her day job as an apprentice landscaper. After kicking 41 goals during the 2016 VFL Women's (VFLW) season for the St Kilda Sharks, she was drafted by Collingwood with the club's eleventh selection (eighty-sixth overall) in the 2016 AFL Women's draft.

== AFL Women's career ==
Garner made her AFLW debut in round 1 of 2017, playing for Collingwood in the competition's inaugural match at IKON Park against Carlton. During the opening quarter, she kicked the league's first-ever goal (her team's only goal in the 35-point loss).

Collingwood re-signed Garner for the 2018 season during the trade period in May 2017. On 2 September, she played for Victoria in the inaugural AFL Women's State of Origin match, and was named among her team's best players with a game-high (and career-best) five goals.

In May 2018, Garner accepted an offer to join expansion club North Melbourne. Her first season with the club led to selection in the All-Australian team as a half-forward. She received greater acclaim for her performances during the 2020 season, winning the AFLPA Most Valuable Player and AFLCA Champion Player of the Year awards. Garner also claimed her first club best and fairest award, as well as earning her second All-Australian selection. However, she was "stunningly overlooked" in the league best and fairest count, polling just four votes.

In 2021, during an 11-point round seven victory against the Western Bulldogs at North Hobart Oval, Garner broke the record for most clearances in an AFLW match with 13. She capped off the season by winning her second club best and fairest award. Garner had another strong season in 2022 season 6, leading the goalkicking for North Melbourne for the second year in a row while also earning her fourth consecutive All-Australian selection and being named captain of the All-Australian side. She re-signed with the club in June 2022 for a further two seasons. Garner came 11th overall in the AFLW's best and fairest award in 2022, polling 12 votes across ten games.

In 2024, Garner had 35 possessions in the AFLW Grand Final which saw her team North Melbourne Kangaroos win their first AFLW Premiership.

Garner was named North Melbourne's captain for the 2025 season, replacing premiership captain Emma Kearney.

Garner's partner is fellow North Melbourne player Jenna Bruton.

== Statistics ==
Statistics are correct to the end of home and away, 2024.

Legend
G	Goals	K	Kicks	D	Disposals	T	Tackles
B	Behinds	H	Handballs	M	Marks

Season	Team	No.	Games	Totals							Averages (per game)							Votes
Season	Team	No.	Games	G	B	K	H	D	M	T	G	B	K	H	D	M	T	Votes
2017	Collingwood	43	7	5	3	52	10	62	23	17	0.7	0.4	7.4	1.4	8.9	3.3	2.4	1
2018	Collingwood	43	7	5	3	67	20	87	29	32	0.7	0.4	9.6	2.9	12.4	4.1	4.6	3
2019	North Melbourne	25	7	5	4	68	24	92	25	15	0.7	0.6	9.7	3.4	13.1	3.6	2.1	0
2020	North Melbourne	25	7	8	3	99	42	141	32	33	1.1	0.4	14.1	6.0	20.1	4.6	4.6	4
2021	North Melbourne	25	10	9	6	133	73	206	45	54	0.9	0.6	13.3	7.3	20.6	4.5	5.4	9
2022 (S6)	North Melbourne	25	11	11	5	144	86	230	45	42	1.0	0.5	13.1	7.8	20.9	4.1	3.8	11
2022 (S7)	North Melbourne	25	13	8	2	198	98	296	55	67	0.6	0.2	15.2	7.5	22.8	4.2	5.2	12
2023	North Melbourne	25	13	13	13	250	122	372	46	94	1.0	1.0	19.2	9.4	28.6	3.5	7.2	14
2024	North Melbourne	25	11	13	10	187	97	284	26	81	1.2	0.9	17	8.8	25.8	2.4	7.4	
Career			86	77	49	1198	572	1770	326	435	0.9	0.6	13.9	6.7	20.6	3.8	5.1	42
