= Mim Strom =

Australian rules footballer

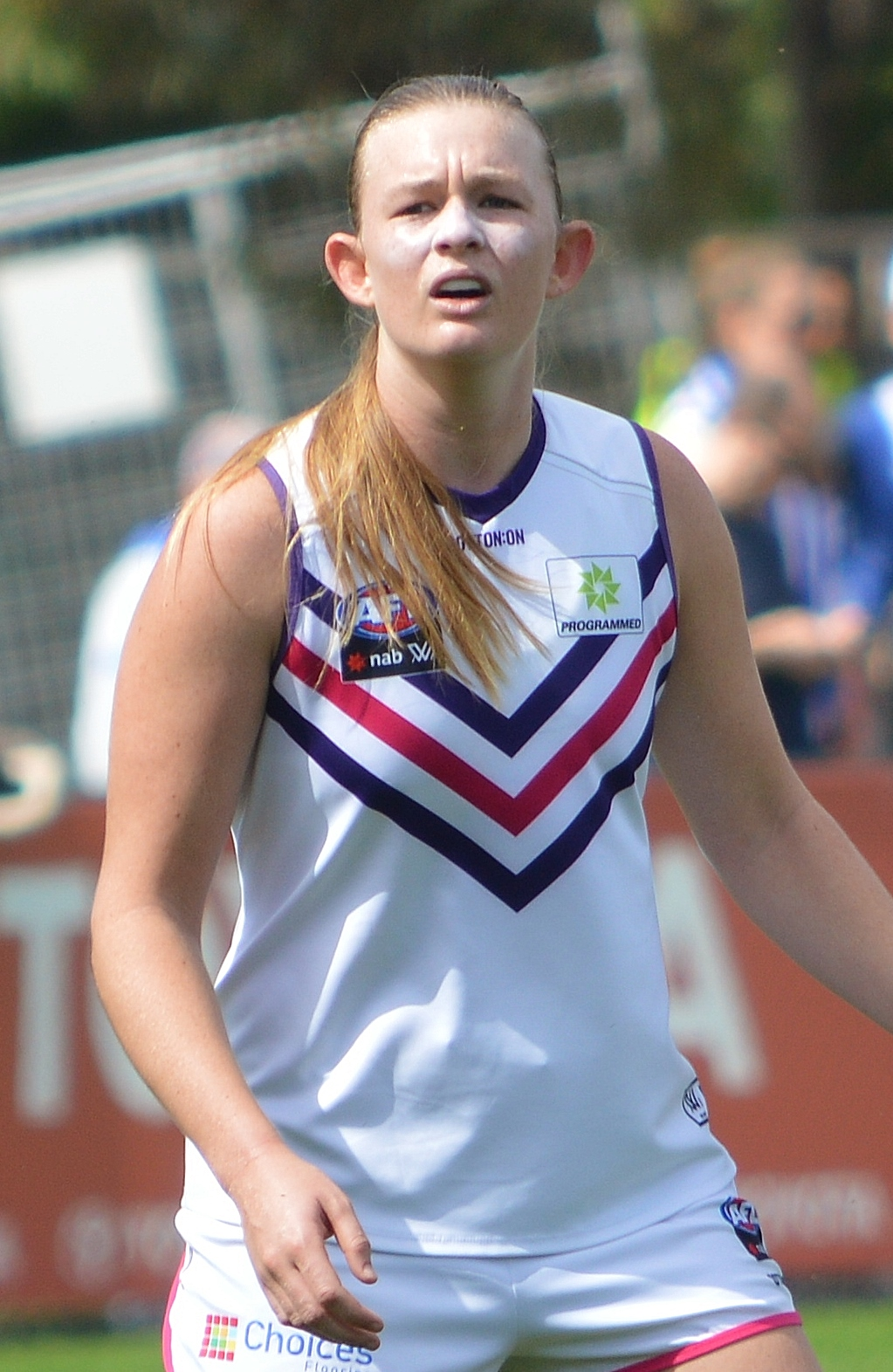
- Strom with Fremantle in March 2021

Personal information
- Born: 7 November 2001 (age 24)
- Original team: Swan Districts (WAWFL)
- Draft: No. 21, 2019 AFL Women's draft
- Debut: Round 1, 2020, Fremantle vs. Geelong, at Fremantle Oval
- Height: 184 cm (6 ft 0 in)
- Position: Ruck

Club information
- Current club: Fremantle
- Number: 21

Playing career^{1}
Years	Club	Games (Goals)
2020–	Fremantle	85 (4)
- ^{1} Playing statistics correct to the end of the 2026 season.

Career highlights
- 2× AFL Women's All Australian Team: 2024, 2025; Fremantle fairest and best: 2024; Western Derby Medal: 2024

Mim Strom (born 7 November 2001) is an Australian rules footballer playing for the Fremantle Football Club in the AFL Women's (AFLW).

== Early life ==
Originally from the small coastal town of Exmouth, Western Australia, Strom played a variety of sports growing up, including netball, basketball and Australian rules football, and playing junior football for the Exmouth Eagles in the Gascoyne Football Association.

In 2019, Strom started playing for South Fremantle in the Rogers Cup, a developmental league for female footballers under the age of 18 in Western Australia, before transferring to the Swan Districts' league side in the WAFL Women's later that year. She played in the inaugural grand final for Swan Districts, and was named as one of the best players in the match. Strom also represented Western Australia in the 2019 AFL Women's Under-18 Championships, being named in their All-Australian team.

== AFLW career ==
Strom was drafted by Fremantle with their second selection, 21st overall, in the 2019 AFL Women's draft.

=== 2020: Debut season ===
After fellow ruckwoman Aine Tighe suffered an ACL injury during the pre-season, Strom was tasked with playing as the sole ruck for the Fremantle Dockers. She was named to make her debut in round one of the 2020 AFL Women's season against Geelong at Fremantle Oval, with former Fremantle ruckman and great Aaron Sandilands presenting her match guernsey. Strom said of the experience:

"I was presented with my playing jumper for round one by Aaron Sandilands! I don’t think you could ask for a better legend of the game to present your jumper"

She had fourteen hit-outs and collected seven disposals during the match, and was named as one of the Dockers best players in the afl.com match report following the 16-point win. Strom finished her debut year having played all six games of the home and away season, as Fremantle went undefeated to sit atop the AFLW ladder. She gathered 14 hit-outs and 9 disposals in the semi-finals as Fremantle dominated a first-year Suns team to run out 70-point winners at Fremantle Oval. Unfortunately for Strom and her teammates, the season was ultimately cancelled without a winner, due to fears of a potential pandemic stemming from the newly discovered COVID-19 respiratory virus.

=== 2023 ===
In 2023, she finished third place in Fremantle's fairest and best award count, polling 123 votes. She was also named in the initial 42-woman All-Australian squad, but was overlooked in favor of Sydney's Ally Morphett for the ruck position in the final team.

=== 2024: Breakout season and breaking records ===
Strom's breakout 2024 season was recognised with selection as the first ruck in the 2024 AFL Women's All Australian Team, and winning the Fremantle fairest and best award.

Strom currently holds the record for most hit-outs in a single game, a record she broke twice during the 2024 AFL Women's season:

- 55 hit-outs in the elimination finals
- 48 hit-outs in weeks one and eight (tied with Jess Allan)
- 47 hit-outs in week seven (tied with Jess Allan and Erin McKinnon)

She set a new league record for hit-outs in round one, amassing 48 hit-outs in her 50th game. She would equal this record in week eight, before setting a new league record in the elimination finals with 55 hit-outs, making her the first player to record more than 50 hit-outs in a match. Mim also holds the record for most hit-outs in a home-and-away season, with 390.

=== 2025-2026 ===
Following the 2025 AFL Women's season, Strom was once again named as ruck in the All-Australian team. She also played every game for the seventh consecutive season.

In Round 5 of the 2026 AFL women's season against Essendon, Strom was a late withdrawal due to soreness after hurting her shoulder the week prior, ending her run of 78 consecutive games dating back to 2020.

== Personal life ==
Strom's two older brothers, Zach and Noah, both play in the West Australian Football League (WAFL) for South Fremantle and her younger sister, Indi, also plays for Fremantle in the AFLW, having been drafted in 2024.

== Statistics ==
Updated to the end of 2025.

Legend
G	Goals	K	Kicks	D	Disposals	T	Tackles
B	Behinds	H	Handballs	M	Marks	H/O	Hit-outs
†	Led the league for the season

Season	Team	No.	Games	Totals								Averages (per game)								Votes
Season	Team	No.	Games	G	B	K	H	D	M	T	H/O	G	B	K	H	D	M	T	H/O	Votes
2020	Fremantle	21	7	0	0	19	31	50	10	21	114	0.0	0.0	2.7	4.4	7.1	1.4	3.0	16.3	0
2021	Fremantle	21	10	0	0	26	43	69	12	32	112	0.0	0.0	2.6	4.3	6.9	1.2	3.2	11.2	0
2022 (S6)	Fremantle	21	12	0	0	43	59	102	25	50	162	0.0	0.0	3.6	4.9	8.5	2.1	4.2	13.5	0
2022 (S7)	Fremantle	21	10	1	1	57	60	117	18	41	169	0.1	0.1	5.7	6.0	11.7	1.8	4.1	16.9	0
2023	Fremantle	21	10	0	0	51	68	119	22	49	257	0.0	0.0	5.1	6.8	11.9	2.2	4.9	25.7	3
2024	Fremantle	21	13	1	3	115	100	215	48	81	479^{†}	0.1	0.2	8.8	7.7	16.5	3.7	6.2	36.8^{†}	11
2025	Fremantle	21	12	0	2	129	102	231	28	81	237	0.0	0.2	10.8	8.5	19.3	2.3	6.8	19.8	11
Career			74	2	6	440	463	903	163	355	1530	0.0	0.1	5.9	6.3	12.2	2.2	4.8	20.7	25
