= Maeve Chaplin =

Australian rules footballer

Personal information
- Born: 22 August 2002 (age 24)
- Original teams: Carlton (VFLW); Darebin Falcons (VFLW); Northern Knights (Talent League); West Preston Lakeside (NFNL)
- Draft: Replacement signing in 2021; No. 44, 2022 draft
- Debut: Round 1, 2022 (S7), Melbourne vs. Adelaide, at Glenelg Oval
- Height: 167 cm (5 ft 6 in)

Club information
- Current club: Melbourne
- Number: 13

Playing career^{1}
| Years | Club | Games (Goals) |
| 2022 (S6)– | Melbourne | 45 (1) |
- ^{1} Playing statistics correct to the end of the 2025 season.

Career highlights
- AFLW premiership player: 2022 (S7); All-Australian: 2025

Maeve Chaplin (born 22 August 2002) is a professional Australian rules footballer who plays for the Melbourne Football Club in the AFL Women's (AFLW).

== Early career ==
Growing up in Melbourne's northern suburbs, Chaplin originally played her junior football for West Preston Lakeside Football Club in the Northern Football League.

She then represented the Northern Knights in the Talent League Girls competition, where she won a premiership. She later represented Vic Metro in the 2021 AFL Women's Under-19 Championships in her draft year, but was overlooked in the 2019 and 2020 drafts.

== AFL Women's career ==
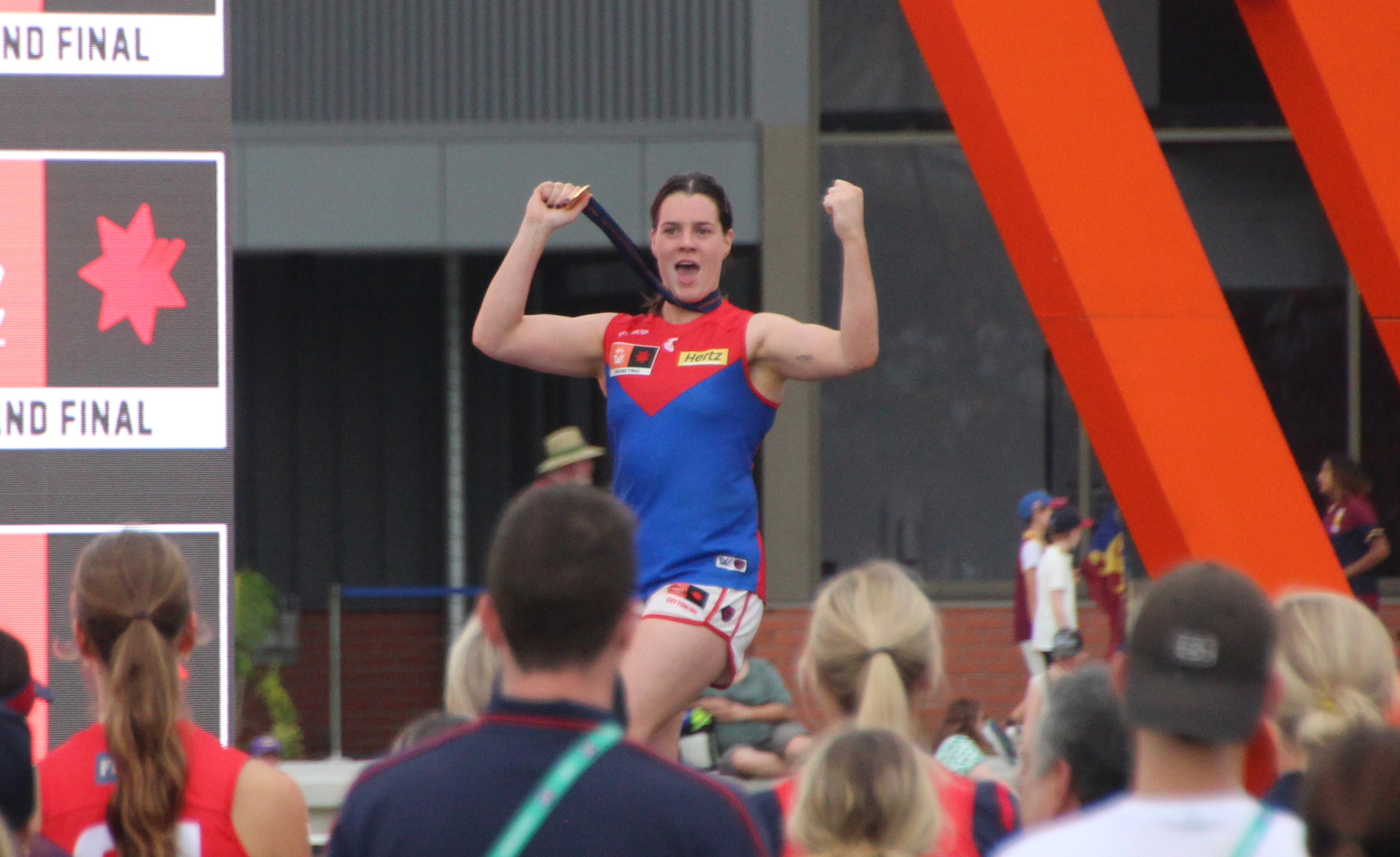
Chaplin celebrates with her premiership medal following the 2022 S7 Grand Final

Chaplin was added to Melbourne's rookie list as a replacement signing after Isabella Simmons's foot injury ruled her out for the 2022 season 6.

After a year on Melbourne's rookie list without a senior appearance, she was delisted by the club with a commitment to a senior list position through the 2022 draft. She returned to the Demons with the 44th overall pick in the draft. The next season, Chaplin made her AFLW debut in round one against Adelaide at Glenelg Oval. She would go on to make 12 senior appearances in season 7 and become a premiership player when Melbourne defeated Brisbane in the Grand Final.

Following a career-best 2025 season in which she played every home-and-away game for the Demons, Chaplin was named in the All-Australian team. However, on the eve of Melbourne's finals series, Chaplin injured her hamstring and missed both the qualifying final and the semi-final. She returned for the preliminary final, but the Demons went down to eventual premiers North Melbourne.

== Statistics ==
Updated to the end of the 2025 season.

Legend
| G | Goals | K | Kicks | D | Disposals | T | Tackles |
| B | Behinds | H | Handballs | M | Marks |
| # | Played in that season's premiership team |

| Season | Team | No. | Games | Totals | | | | | | | Averages (per game) | | | | | | |
| Season | Team | No. | Games | G | B | K | H | D | M | T | G | B | K | H | D | M | T |
|---|---|---|---|---|---|---|---|---|---|---|---|---|---|---|---|---|---|
| 2022 (S6) | Melbourne | – | 0 | – | – | – | – | – | – | – | – | – | – | – | – | – | – |
| 2022 (S7)^{#} | Melbourne | 13 | 12 | 0 | 1 | 56 | 32 | 88 | 11 | 23 | 0.0 | 0.1 | 4.7 | 2.7 | 7.3 | 0.9 | 1.9 |
| 2023 | Melbourne | 13 | 9 | 0 | 1 | 43 | 30 | 73 | 11 | 21 | 0.0 | 0.1 | 4.8 | 3.3 | 8.1 | 1.2 | 2.3 |
| 2024 | Melbourne | 13 | 11 | 0 | 0 | 100 | 50 | 150 | 29 | 31 | 0.0 | 0.0 | 9.1 | 4.5 | 13.6 | 2.6 | 2.8 |
| 2025 | Melbourne | 13 | 13 | 1 | 0 | 169 | 68 | 237 | 45 | 52 | 0.1 | 0.0 | 13.0 | 5.2 | 18.2 | 3.5 | 4.0 |
| Career | | | 45 | 1 | 2 | 368 | 180 | 548 | 96 | 127 | 0.0 | 0.0 | 8.2 | 4.0 | 12.2 | 2.1 | 2.8 |
