= Laura Gardiner =

Australian rules footballer (born 2002)

Personal information
- Full name: Laura Gardiner
- Born: 21 November 2002 (age 23)
- Original team: Geelong Falcons (NAB League Girls)
- Draft: No. 20, 2020 national draft
- Debut: Round 4, 2021, Geelong vs. St Kilda, at RSEA Park
- Height: 165 cm (5 ft 5 in)
- Position: Midfielder

Club information
- Current club: Sydney
- Number: 31

Playing career^{1}
| Years | Club | Games (Goals) |
| 2021–2022 (S7) | Geelong | 18 (2) |
| 2023– | Sydney | 33 (4) |
| Total | | 51 (6) |
- ^{1} Playing statistics correct to the end of the 2025 season.

Career highlights
- AFL Women's All-Australian team: 2023; 2× Sydney Club Champion: 2023, 2025

Laura Gardiner (born 21 November 2002) is an Australian rules footballer playing for the Sydney Swans in the AFL Women's (AFLW). She previously played for the Geelong Football Club from 2021 to season 7. Gardiner was selected in the 2023 AFL Women's All-Australian team and is a dual Sydney Club Champion.

== AFL Women's career ==
=== Geelong (2021–2022) ===
Gardiner was drafted by Geelong with pick no. 20 in the 2020 AFL Women's draft from local club the Geelong Falcons. Gardiner made her AFLW debut in the Cats' 29-point loss to St Kilda in round 4, 2021, going on to play 3 senior games in her first season. She played another 15 games for Geelong across the two seasons in 2022, but struggled to cement her position in the senior side and the midfield. Despite this, Gardiner performed strongly at VFLW level, winning Geelong's best and fairest in 2021 and being named in the team of the year in 2022. She was traded to Sydney in exchange for pick no. 1 in the 2023 AFL Women's supplementary draft on the final day of the corresponding trade period.

=== Sydney (2023–present) ===
Gardiner played all 12 games for Sydney in 2023 as the side reached its first ever finals series. She ranked third in the competition for both disposals and tackles as her consistent standout performances led to a runner-up finish in the AFL Coaches Association (AFLCA) Champion Player of the Year award. This was the only known case of an AFLW player polling votes from each coach in each game of a season. Gardiner also earned her first All-Australian selection on the interchange bench, and was voted into the AFL Players' Association 22under22 team.

In 2024, Gardiner was named Sydney's best player in its win over Collingwood in round 1, and was among its best players in losses to St Kilda in round 2 and Richmond in round 3.

== Statistics ==
Updated to the end of the 2025 season.

Legend
| G | Goals | K | Kicks | D | Disposals | T | Tackles |
| B | Behinds | H | Handballs | M | Marks |

| Season | Team | No. | Games | Totals | | | | | | | Averages (per game) | | | | | | | Votes |
| Season | Team | No. | Games | G | B | K | H | D | M | T | G | B | K | H | D | M | T | Votes |
|---|---|---|---|---|---|---|---|---|---|---|---|---|---|---|---|---|---|---|
| 2021 | Geelong | 18 | 3 | 0 | 0 | 18 | 20 | 38 | 3 | 19 | 0.0 | 0.0 | 6.0 | 6.7 | 12.7 | 1.0 | 6.3 | 2 |
| 2022 (S6) | Geelong | 18 | 5 | 0 | 1 | 28 | 39 | 67 | 5 | 22 | 0.0 | 0.2 | 5.6 | 7.8 | 13.4 | 1.0 | 4.4 | 0 |
| 2022 (S7) | Geelong | 18 | 10 | 2 | 4 | 48 | 54 | 102 | 24 | 33 | 0.2 | 0.4 | 4.8 | 5.4 | 10.2 | 2.4 | 3.3 | 0 |
| 2023 | Sydney | 31 | 12 | 2 | 2 | 169 | 180 | 349 | 32 | 109 | 0.2 | 0.2 | 14.1 | 15.0 | 29.1 | 2.7 | 9.1 | 7 |
| 2024 | Sydney | 31 | 9 | 0 | 0 | 138 | 122 | 260 | 23 | 53 | 0.0 | 0.0 | 15.3 | 13.6 | 28.9 | 2.6 | 5.9 | 8 |
| 2025 | Sydney | 31 | 12 | 2 | 3 | 204 | 176 | 380 | 40 | 115 | 0.2 | 0.3 | 17.0 | 14.7 | 31.7 | 3.3 | 9.6 | 15 |
| Career | | | 51 | 6 | 10 | 605 | 591 | 1196 | 127 | 351 | 0.1 | 0.2 | 11.9 | 11.6 | 23.5 | 2.5 | 6.9 | 32 |

== Honours and achievements ==
Team

- McClelland Trophy: (Sydney) 2026

Individual

- AFL Women's All-Australian team: 2023
- 2× Sydney Club Champion: 2023, 2025
