= Elizabeth Skinner =

Elizabeth Skinner (a.k.a. Liz Skinner) is a former women's Australian rules football player who played for the Melbourne University Mugars in the Victorian Women's Football League. Skinner started her football career with the Mugars in 1998 and won the club's best and fairest in her first season. Skinner also received the Scorpions VWFL Best New Player of the Year in 1998 and was a multiple premiership player with the Mugars (2002, 2003 and 2005). Skinner represented Victoria in the AFL Women's National Championships on three occasions (2003 – Darwin; 2004 – Melbourne; 2005 – Adelaide) and was selected in the All-Australian team at all three Championships.

Skinner starred in the first VWFL match played at the MCG, which was held on Mother's Day, Sunday May 9, 2004. In a best-on-ground performance, playing across the half-forward and full-forward lines, Skinner kicked eight goals in a match-winning performance. The match was played between the Melbourne University Mugars and the St Albans Spurs, in a rematch of the 2003 VWFL Grand Final, as a curtain-raiser before the AFL match between Melbourne Demons and the West Coast Eagles. The final score was 11.11 (77) to 7.8 (50).

Skinner was named in the VWFL team of the 2000s and on the half-forward flank in the Silver Jubilee team at the VWFL 25th Anniversary Gala Dinner. Skinner retired from the VWFL at the end of the 2005 season.

== Health services career ==
Dr Skinner became the Director of Allied Health Research at Western Health in the inner west of Melbourne, Victoria, Australia. Skinner is an Honorary Research Fellow at both Monash University and the University of Melbourne. Skinner received over $2.9 million in grant funding and has over 50 publications, most of which are peer-reviewed publications, with one book chapter and one government report. In addition, Skinner was a senior clinical physiotherapist specialising in the provision of early rehabilitation and respiratory care within the intensive care unit. Skinner was awarded her PhD from the University of Melbourne in 2011, and her thesis was titled "Health-related quality of life and physical function in Australian survivors of critical illness." Skinner's thesis is available both on Researchgate and the digital repository in the University of Melbourne Library.

Skinner's areas of research include economic evaluation, translation of research into practice, the delivery of rehabilitation within the intensive care unit, outcome measurement, and health services delivery and policy.

Dr Skinner has a h-index of 41 and an i-10 index of 67. Dr Skinner's work has been cited over 6,700 times. Key research findings and contributions include:

- Moving people who are in intensive care and who have kidney failure, on continuous dialysis, is safe and able to be implemented. This is important because these people have frequently been restricted from moving, which can contribute to significant complications if they are in intensive care, including skin ulcers, pressure sores, pneumonia, blood clots and other complications. In fact, moving people (like sitting them on the edge of the bed, allowing them to stand and also to move their hip) might even make the dialysis last longer, which could be more effective.
- The Physical Function in ICU Test (or PFIT) which can be used to test the physical capacity and ability of people to move after they have been admitted to intensive care. Loss of strength and ability to look after themselves, including difficulty walking, can be common in people admitted to intensive care, particularly if they are in ICU more than two days. The PFIT can test how much people have been affected and also help work out which exercises and activities, and what intensity, are most important for the person to do as part of their physiotherapy, to regain their strength and ability to walk.
- Involvement in the development of a novel method of testing the efficacy of health services of uncertain effectiveness, using disinvestment from existing health services. This methodology is currently being used in a large stepped-wedge randomised controlled trial to test the benefit of weekend allied health services in acute hospitals in Victoria, Australia.

Full details of Dr Elizabeth Skinner's research career can be found on Google Scholar or on Researchgate.

In 2016, Dr Lizzie Skinner enrolled to study medicine at Monash University.

She has since become an Advanced Trainee in Cardiology at Alfred Health, and is soon to be a practising cardiologist.
