= Kate Hore =

Australian rules footballer

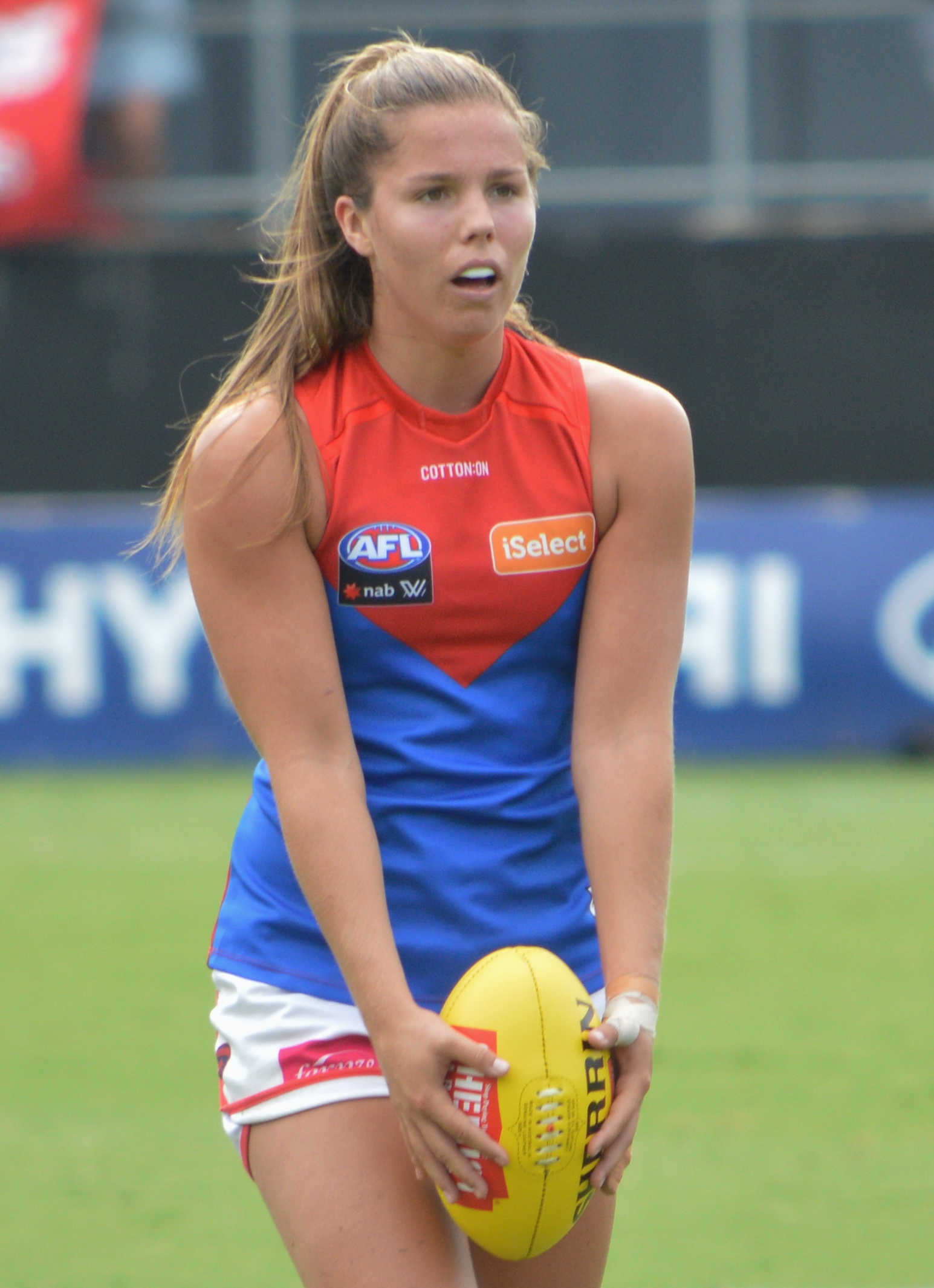
- Hore with Melbourne in March 2018

Personal information
- Born: 26 March 1995 (age 31)
- Original team: St Kilda Sharks (VFLW)
- Debut: Round 1, 2018, Melbourne vs. Greater Western Sydney, at Casey Fields
- Height: 170 cm (5 ft 7 in)
- Position: Forward

Club information
- Current club: Melbourne
- Number: 10

Playing career^{1}
Years	Club	Games (Goals)
2018–	Melbourne	93 (105)
- ^{1} Playing statistics correct to the end of the 2025 season.

Career highlights
- AFLW premiership player: 2022 (S7); 3× Melbourne leading goalkicker: 2020, 2021, 2022 (S7); AFL Women's leading goalkicker: 2023; 4× AFL Women's All-Australian team: 2020, 2022 (S7), 2023, 2025; Melbourne captain: 2023–

Kate Hore (born 25 March 1995) is an Australian rules footballer playing for the Melbourne Football Club in the AFL Women's (AFLW). Hore was recruited by Melbourne as a rookie signing in May 2017. She made her debut in the six-point win against Greater Western Sydney at Casey Fields in the opening round of the 2018 season. The 2020 AFL Women's season saw Hore obtain her first AFL Women's All-Australian team selection, named at full-forward. Further All-Australian honours followed in 2022 (S7), and again in 2023 and 2025 nominated as Captain and Vice-Captain respectively.
