= Harriet Cordner =

Australian rules footballer

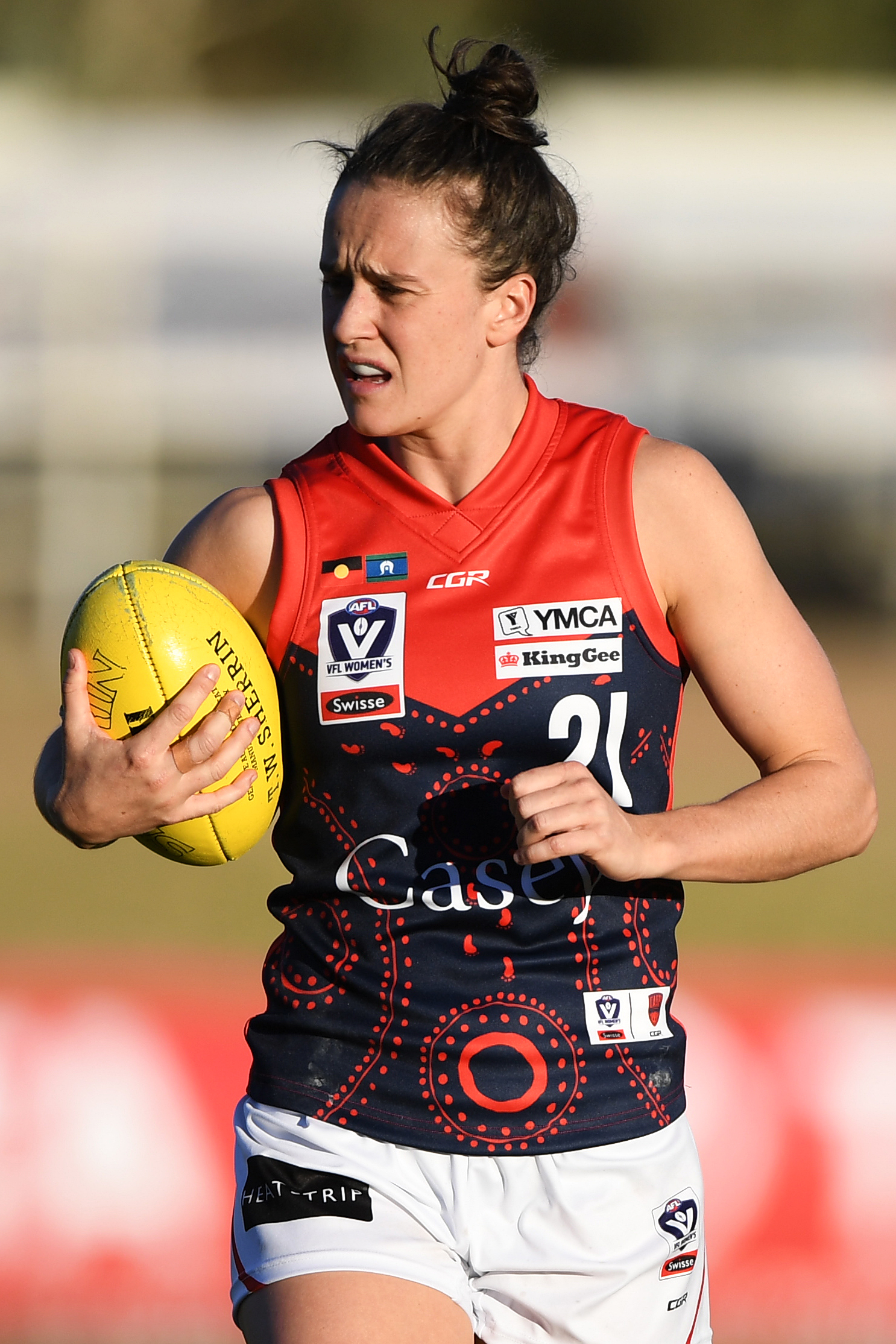
- Cordner playing for Casey Demons in July 2019

Personal information
- Born: 22 July 1992 (age 34)
- Debut: Round 1, 2017, Melbourne vs. Brisbane, at Casey Fields
- Height: 177 cm (5 ft 10 in)
- Position: Tall defender

Club information
- Current club: Carlton

Playing career^{1}
Years	Club	Games (Goals)
2017–2020	Melbourne	25 (1)
2021–S7 (2022)	Richmond	12 (0)
2023–	Carlton	21 (3)
Total		58 (4)
- ^{1} Playing statistics correct to the end of the S7 (2022) season.

Harriet Cordner (born 22 July 1992) is an Australian rules footballer with the Carlton Football Club in the AFL Women's competition. She previously played four seasons with Melbourne after being recruited to the club as a category B rookie in October 2016. She made her debut in the fifteen point loss to Brisbane at Casey Fields in the opening round of the 2017 season. She played every match in her debut season to finish with seven games. She was delisted in May 2017 but was quickly re-signed by Melbourne as a free agent.

She is the granddaughter of the former Melbourne player, Brownlow Medallist, and two-time VFL premiership player Don Cordner.

At the conclusion of the 2020 season, she was traded to Richmond in exchange for an early second round pick in the 2020 draft. Cordner achieved selection in Champion Data's 2021 AFLW All-Star stats team, after leading the league for average intercept marks in the 2021 AFL Women's season, totalling 2.6 a game.

In March 2023, Cordner was traded to Carlton.

== Statistics ==
Statistics are correct to the end of the 2024 season.

Legend
G	Goals	K	Kicks	D	Disposals	T	Tackles
B	Behinds	H	Handballs	M	Marks

Season	Team	No.	Games	Totals							Averages (per game)						
Season	Team	No.	Games	G	B	K	H	D	M	T	G	B	K	H	D	M	T
2017	Melbourne	21	7	1	1	18	11	29	4	23	0.1	0.1	2.6	1.6	4.1	0.6	3.3
2018	Melbourne	21	4	0	0	21	12	33	7	13	0.0	0.0	5.3	3.0	8.3	1.8	3.3
2019	Melbourne	21	7	0	0	45	28	73	16	10	0.0	0.0	6.4	4.0	10.4	2.3	1.4
2020	Melbourne	21	7	0	1	32	27	59	8	20	0.0	0.1	4.6	3.9	8.4	1.1	2.9
2021	Richmond	21	9	0	0	69	42	111	36	26	0.0	0.0	7.7	4.7	12.3	4.0	2.9
2022	Richmond	21	3	0	0	13	7	21	3	5	0.0	0.0	4.3	2.3	6.7	1.0	1.7
2023	Carlton	21	10	3	1	68	50	118	31	32	0.3	0.1	6.8	5.0	11.8	3.1	3.2
2024	Carlton	21	11	0	0	76	66	142	34	37	0.0	0.0	6.9	6.0	12.9	3.1	3.4
Career			58	4	3	342	242	584	139	166	0.1	0.1	5.9	4.2	10.1	2.4	2.9
