= Laura Kane =

Australian sports administrator

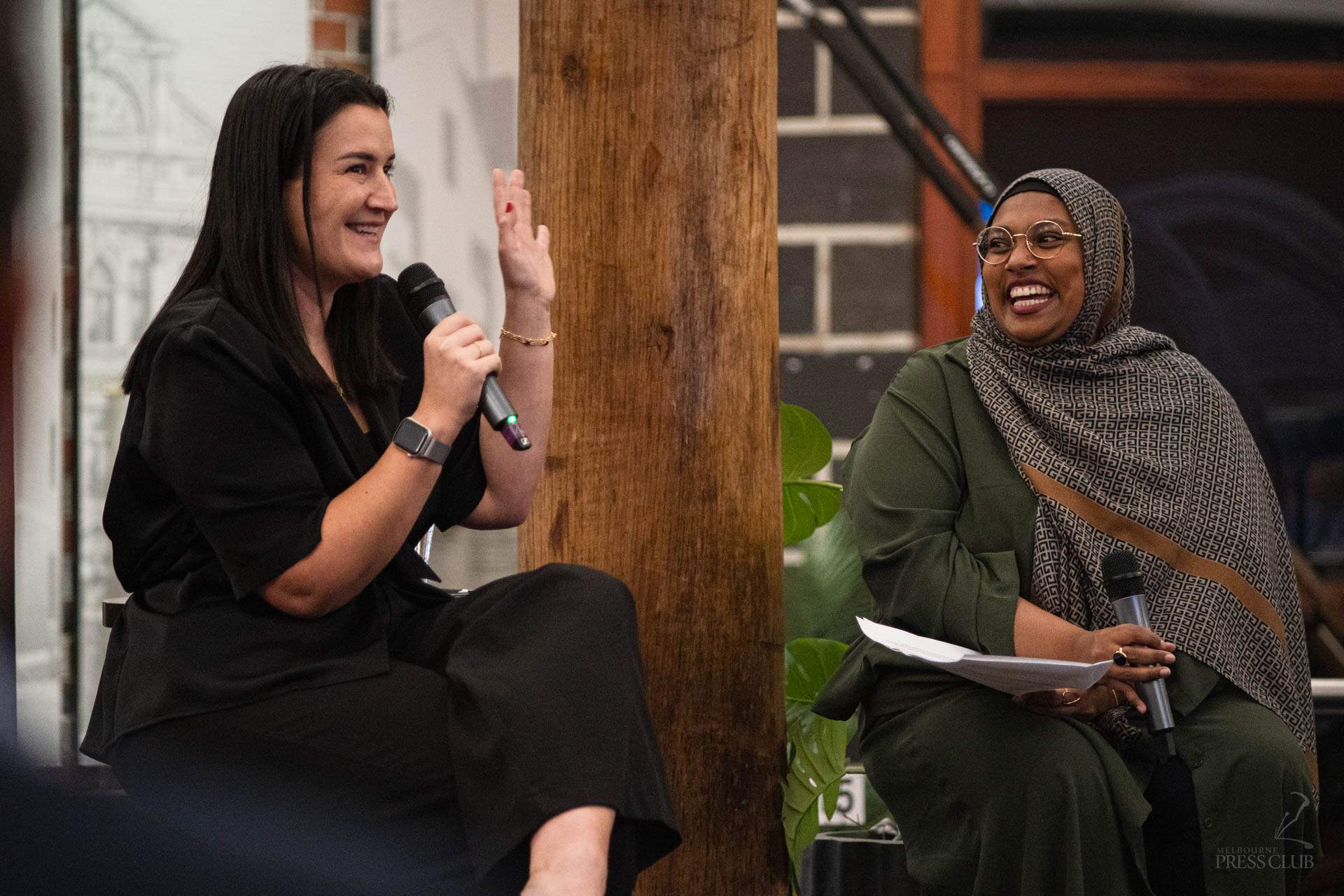
- Kane (left) speaks with journalist Rana Hussain at a Melbourne Press Club event, August 2024.
- Born: 23 June 1990 (age 36)
- Occupation: Sports administrator
- Known for: Executive General Manager of Football Operations at the AFL
- Predecessor: Brad Scott

Laura Kane (born 1989 or 1990) is an Australian sports administrator currently serving as the executive general manager of football at the Australian Football League (AFL).

Kane was appointed to the position in August 2023, having acted in the role since May, and is the first woman to hold that place. In her role, which is the most senior football position in the AFL, Kane is responsible for a wide range of football operations including umpiring, the laws of the game, the AFL Tribunal, and the AFL Women's competition.

== Early life and schooling ==
Kane grew up loving the sport of Australian rules football and participated in Auskick as a pre-teen. While still in high school as a 16-year-old, Kane completed work experience with Victoria Legal Aid at the Supreme Court of Victoria. Following high school, Kane attended university at Victoria University, Melbourne from 2009 to 2012, achieving a Bachelor of Laws (Honours). During this time, she also studied abroad at the Humboldt University of Berlin.

== Sporting career ==
Kane joined the Melbourne University Women's Football Club while in year seven at high school. Her first three years at the club were limited to training only, as the club did not yet have a youth girls team. Once old enough to represent the senior women's team, Kane became a powerful centre half-forward and played into her early 20s before eventually coaching the club.

== Business career ==
In July 2014, Kane began work as a qualified junior solicitor at Waller Legal, at one point representing victims in the Royal Commission into Institutional Responses to Child Sexual Abuse. By October of that year, Kane had risen to the position of president at Melbourne University Women's Football Club (MUWFC), and in 2015 approached fellow female football administrator Sonja Hood about a role at the North Melbourne Football Club, who had established a partnership with MUWFC dating back to 2010. Kane eventually joined the football operations team at North Melbourne in April 2016 while remaining as MUFWC president and holding a position on their board.

In 2017, Kane led North Melbourne's application process for an AFL Women's (AFLW) competition license, and in September that year, was nominated for the Football Woman of the Year award as recognition of her dual roles in senior football. Much of Kane's time developing the application was spent educating staff and the male playing group on the differences between men's and women's football, and she established a player integration committee to further the growth of the female game. North Melbourne was eventually admitted to the AFLW ahead of the 2019 season as part of a joint venture with AFL Tasmania.

Kane moved to the Australian Football League in November 2021 as general manager of competition management, subsequently resigning from the MUWFC board.
