= 2023 AFL Women's season =

Eighth season of the AFL Women's (AFLW) competition

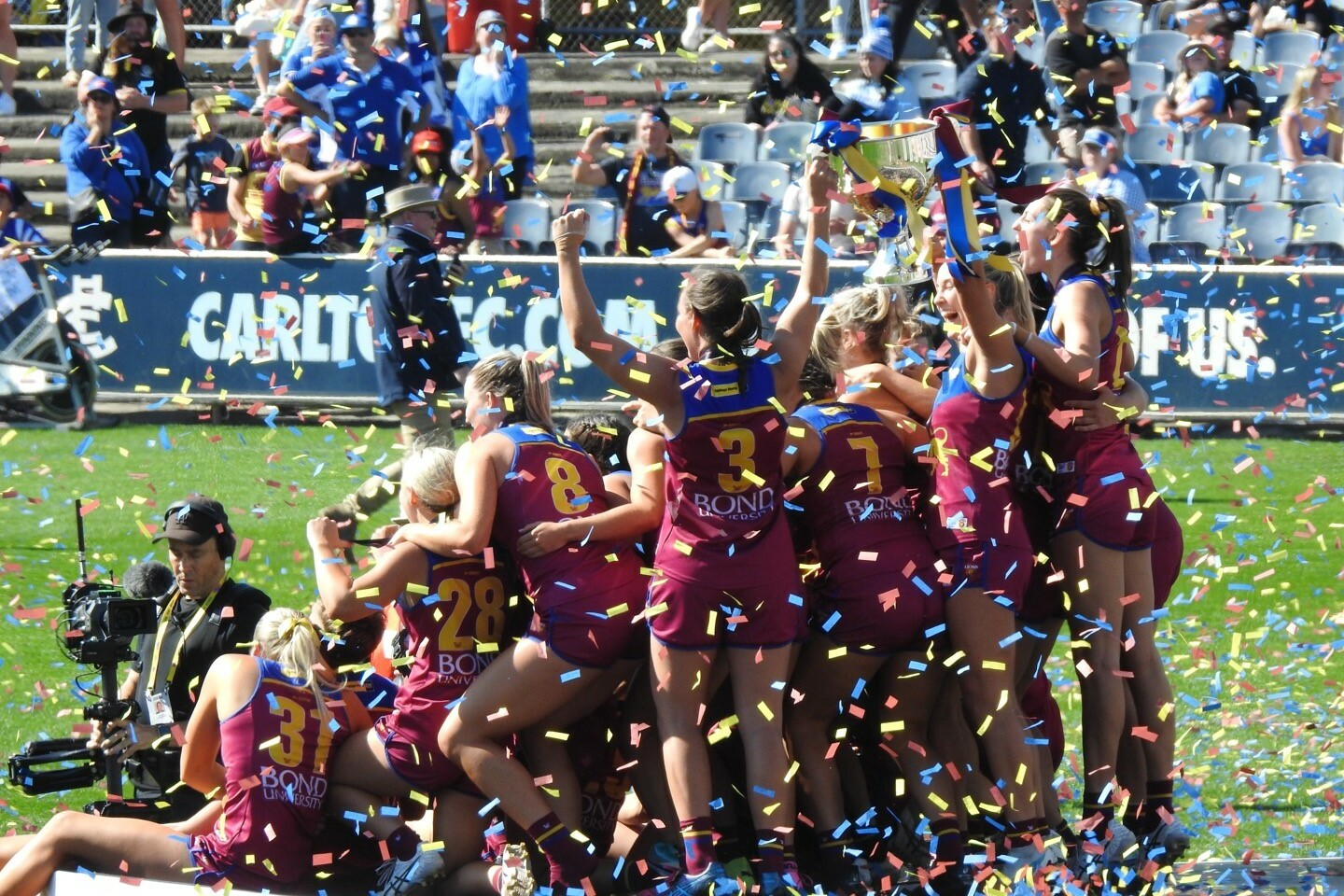
- Brisbane players celebrate after winning the 2023 AFL Women's Grand Final

Overview
- Date: 1 September – 3 December 2023
- Teams: 18
- Premiers: Brisbane; 2nd premiership
- Runners-up: North Melbourne; 1st runners-up result
- Minor premiers: Adelaide; 3rd minor premiership
- Best and fairest: Monique Conti (Richmond); 23 votes
- Leading goalkicker: Kate Hore (Melbourne); Eden Zanker (Melbourne); 20 goals

Attendance
- Matches played: 99
- Total attendance: 284,122 (2,870 per match)
- Highest (H&A): 8,722 (round 1, Adelaide v Port Adelaide)
- Highest (finals): 12,616 (grand final, North Melbourne v Brisbane)

The 2023 AFL Women's season was the eighth season of the AFL Women's (AFLW) competition, the highest-level senior women's Australian rules football competition in Australia. The season featured 18 clubs and ran from 1 September to 3 December, comprising a ten-round home-and-away season followed by a four-week finals series featuring the top eight clubs.

Brisbane won the premiership, defeating North Melbourne by 17 points in the 2023 AFL Women's Grand Final. Adelaide won the minor premiership by finishing atop the home-and-away ladder with a 9–1 win–loss record, but was eliminated by North Melbourne in the preliminary finals. Richmond's Monique Conti won the AFL Women's best and fairest award as the league's best and fairest player, and Melbourne teammates Kate Hore and Eden Zanker tied for the AFL Women's leading goalkicker award as the league's leading goalkickers.

== Background ==
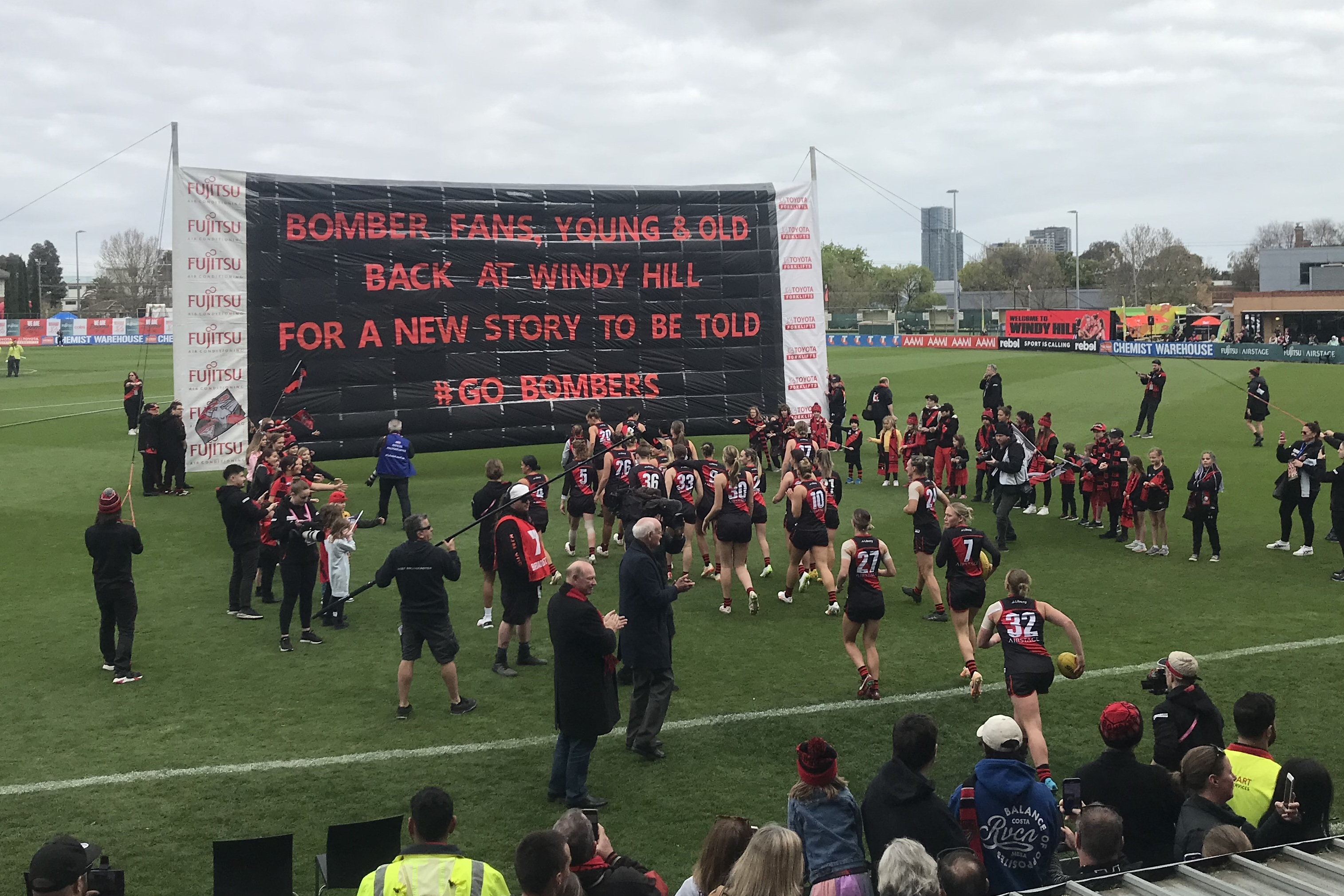
Essendon players take the field prior to the club's match against St Kilda at Windy Hill; the match marked Essendon's first top-level match at its spiritual home since 1991.

In March 2023, Australian Football League (AFL) general manager of football operations Andrew Dillon announced that the season would begin on the first weekend of September, coinciding with the AFL's pre-finals bye weekend, though neither the season length nor a specific start date was confirmed. A pre-season start date of 29 May was announced, though AFL Players Association (AFLPA) chief executive officer Paul Marsh stated that AFLW players and the AFL were "a long way apart" on agreeing to the 2023 season's length and structure as part of a joint AFL-AFLW collective bargaining agreement.

Following the end of season 7, the AFL announced that female players would be exempt from wearing white shorts as part of their away uniforms in the AFL Women's, VFL Women's and other AFL-managed female talent pathways from 2023 onwards to ease anxiety and reduce barriers for players who are menstruating. For away matches, teams would instead wear home shorts or an AFL-approved alternate coloured set for clash uniforms. In June, several other rules and rule adjustments were announced for the upcoming season:

- Quarter lengths were increased to 15 minutes plus time-on for goals or major injuries only, with time-on in the final two minutes also allowed for stoppages.
- The quarter-time and three-quarter-time intervals were reduced in length from six minutes and 30 seconds to six minutes, and the half-time interval was reduced in length from 16 minutes to 14 minutes.
- Boundary throw-ins between the 50-metre arcs were moved ten metres inwards from the boundary line.
- An interchange cap of 60 player rotations per team per match was introduced, with clubs permitted to use interchange boards to convey messages, as was commonplace in the AFL.
- Runners were only permitted to enter the field three times per quarter, for a maximum of 90 seconds on each occasion, until the last three minutes of each quarter.
- A two-year rollover period was introduced for reportable and fixed-financial offences committed by players, resulting in fine amounts increasing if a player commits the same offence more than once in the previous two years, rather than only within the current season.

The 2023 season fixture was released in July. Leading into the season, reigning premier Melbourne was the favourite to win the premiership, with publications such as Fox Sports and ESPN predicting that Melbourne would win its second consecutive premiership, and 14 of the 18 club captains tipping Melbourne as the team most likely to reach the grand final outside of their own. In August, the AFL announced that the AFLW's prize money would rise from $623,922 to $1.1 million for the upcoming season, matching the prize money for the men's competition, however the money would be split across the season's top eight teams, while the AFL's would be split between its top four teams. The league had announced earlier in the year that the McClelland Trophy, which was first awarded in 1951 and had been awarded to the AFL's minor premiers since 1991, would be revamped to incorporate both AFL and AFLW results, (Note: AFL wins would be worth four premiership points and draws worth two points, while AFLW wins would be worth eight premiership points and draws worth four points to reflect the shorter season, with the formula to later be reviewed based on potential future changes to AFLW season length.) with an additional $1 million prize money awarded to the winning club.

== Overview ==
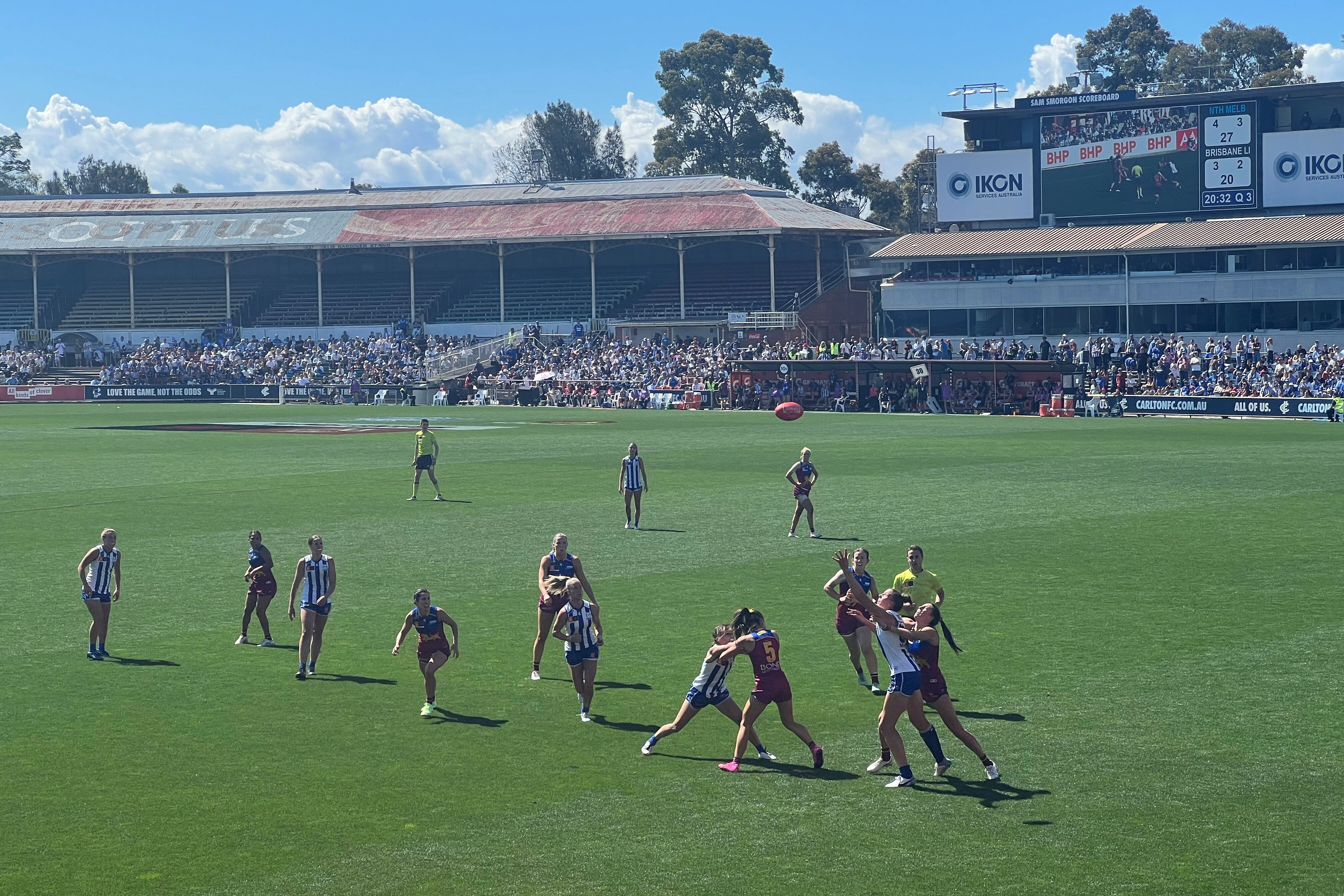
North Melbourne and Brisbane players contest the football during the 2023 AFL Women's Grand Final

The season began on 1 September with a match between Melbourne and Collingwood, where Melbourne unveiled its season 7 premiership flag, and concluded on 3 December with the 2023 AFL Women's Grand Final. All matches throughout the season were broadcast live on the Seven Network and Fox Footy, and could be streamed via Kayo and the official AFLW website and app. The season featured ten home-and-away rounds and four weeks of finals, as was the case in season 7, with the final round released as a floating fixture to be determined later in the season. Adelaide won the minor premiership, while Melbourne won the McClelland Trophy as the best-performed club across the AFL and AFLW seasons despite neither of its teams reaching a grand final.

With several larger-capacity venues unavailable in December due to cricket, (Note: Several Test, One Day International and Twenty20 cricket matches were scheduled to be played across eleven venues around Australia between October 2023 and February 2024.) potential grand final venues were finalised for all 18 clubs at the time of the fixture release in July, unlike in season 7 when potential venues were only finalised nine days before the grand final. North Melbourne went on to win hosting rights for the grand final as the highest-seeded (Note: During the finals series, amid confusion among the remaining teams regarding finals rankings after the home-and-away season's top two teams, Adelaide and Melbourne, lost their respective qualifying finals, the AFL clarified that rankings would change depending on finals results; in this case, as the highest-placed team to reach a preliminary final, North Melbourne was the top seed. The AFL Commission codified this system into the laws of the game in February 2024.) preliminary final winner, meaning that the grand final would be held in Victoria for the first time since 2018; the grand final was held at Ikon Park, with tickets selling out within three hours. Marvel Stadium, which could accommodate an additional 40,000 spectators, was overlooked after its turf was deemed unsuitable for matches. (Note: While the venue had technically become available after concerts scheduled for that weekend were postponed, the AFL ruled that its turf was "not suitable for any games" after hosting several concerts and a 2023 FIM Supercross World Championship event.) Brisbane defeated North Melbourne by 17 points in the grand final to win its second AFL Women's premiership.

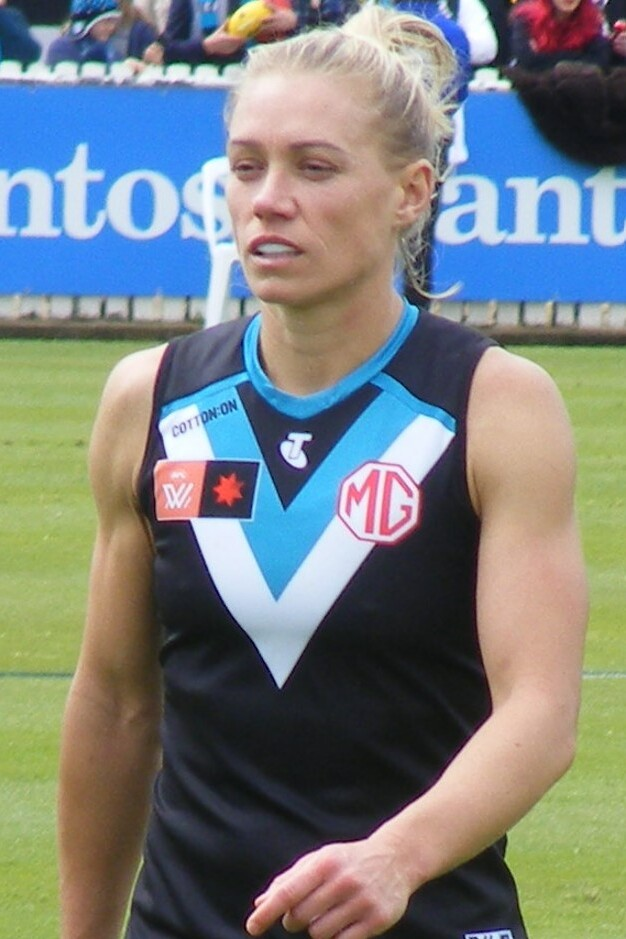
Port Adelaide captain Erin Phillips announced her playing retirement towards the end of the season.

During the season, the AFL and AFLPA agreed to a five-year, $2.26 billion collective bargaining agreement through to the end of 2027, marking the first joint agreement between AFL and AFLW players; 99.7% of AFLW players agreed to the deal, which included the following changes:

- AFLW player payments would increase by 29% for the current season (to an average wage of $60,000), with the average wage to increase to $82,000 by 2027.
- Clubs would play eleven home-and-away matches in 2024, with further increases (to as many as 14 matches in 2027) dependent on the competition reaching certain performance metrics (average match attendance of 6,000 and average TV audience of 100,000).
- A twelve-month pregnancy policy which would commence from six weeks before a player's due date.
- A $60 million investment into injury hardship allowances and concussion funds over the length of the agreement.

The season's Indigenous Round was held during rounds 7 and 8, with all 18 teams wearing specially designed guernseys across the two weeks. The round is held to acknowledge the contributions of Aboriginal and Torres Strait Islander women and girls to Australian football and the wider community. Former player, umpire and Northern Territory women's football pioneer Ebony Abbott-McCormack was the 2023 edition's honoree. Three clubs rebranded themselves as Indigenous names across the two weeks of Indigenous Round: Fremantle as Walyalup, the traditional name for the Noongar country around Fremantle; Melbourne as Narrm, the traditional name for Melbourne in the Woiwurrung language; and Port Adelaide as Yartapuulti, the traditional name the Kaurna people gave the land around the Port River.

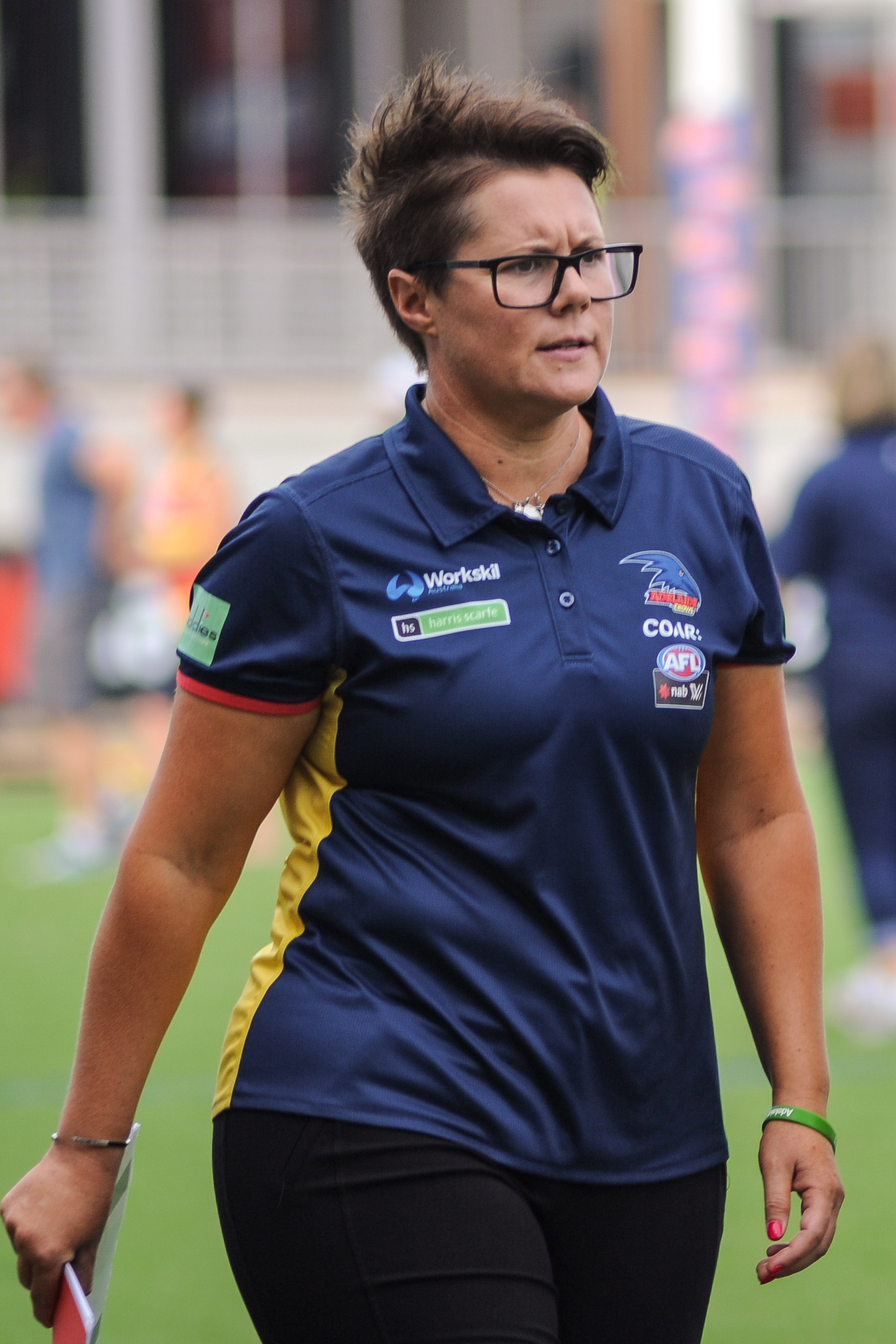
Hawthorn coach Bec Goddard, pictured during her time as Adelaide coach, retired from coaching at the end of the season.

Leading into the season, the AFL announced its intention to focus on "heartland venues", preferring to fill smaller venues rather than struggle to fill larger ones, despite recording a decline of 60% in attendance figures from the inaugural season in 2017 to season 7. The league recorded a cumulative attendance of 43,431 in round 1 at an average audience of 4,781 per match, a record for a single round since matches became ticketed in 2021, with the attendance of 8,412 for the match between Melbourne and Collingwood the highest for a season-opening match since 2020. However, the average attendance dropped to 2,589 per match by the end of the season, falling short of the minimum attendance required (average of 3,500 per match) to increase to twelve home-and-away rounds for the 2024 season. Sydney recorded the highest average attendance of any club for the season with 4,637, with its biggest crowd of 5,722 coming in its final home match against Collingwood. After going winless in season 7, the club's first season in the competition, Sydney would go on to make finals in 2023 and win its first AFLW final in an elimination final against Gold Coast, before being eliminated by Adelaide in the semi-finals.

Among the playing retirements in 2023 was three-time premiership player and two-time AFL Women's best and fairest winner Erin Phillips, who played 66 matches for Adelaide and Port Adelaide, captaining both clubs, and was a three-time AFL Women's All-Australian and two-time grand final best-on-ground winner. Phillips' first coach at Adelaide, Bec Goddard, who coached Adelaide to the inaugural AFL Women's premiership in 2017 and had more recently coached Hawthorn for its first two seasons, announced her retirement from coaching in November. Goddard was one of four coaches to depart their respective coaching roles in 2023, with West Coast coach Michael Prior ending his tenure mid-season, Western Bulldogs coach Nathan Burke leaving after a one-win season and Collingwood coach Stephen Symonds parting ways after failing to lead his club to the finals. During the season, Burke questioned the fitness and professionalism of his players after his team lost its first five matches and criticised AFLW list sizes as too small, while Prior criticised the AFLW fixturing process after West Coast was fixtured to play against reigning premier Melbourne despite the former's 16th-place finish the previous season and lost by 70 points, before later acknowledging his comments as "unacceptable". Later in November, AFL general manager of women's football Nicole Livingstone announced her departure from the league following that weekend's grand final after seven seasons in the position; her achievements included the competition's expansion from eight clubs in 2017 to 18 clubs, and the growth of the competition to become the largest employer of female athletes in Australia, with 540 AFLW players on club lists in 2023.

== Coach appointments ==
New coach	Club	Date of appointment	Previous coach	Ref.
Lisa Webb	Fremantle	10 February 2023	Trent Cooper	
Mathew Buck	Carlton	4 April 2023	Daniel Harford	

== Club leadership ==
Club	Coach	Leadership group		
Club	Coach	Captain(s)	Vice-captain(s)	Other leader(s)
Adelaide	Matthew Clarke	Chelsea Randall	Sarah Allan	Eloise Jones, Ebony Marinoff, Stevie-Lee Thompson
Brisbane	Craig Starcevich	Breanna Koenen	Nat Grider	Ally Anderson, Sophie Conway, Belle Dawes, Cathy Svarc
Carlton	Mathew Buck	Kerryn Peterson	Jess Dal Pos, Mimi Hill	Abbie McKay, Breann Moody, Darcy Vescio
Collingwood	Stephen Symonds	Brianna Davey	Brittany Bonnici, Ruby Schleicher	Jordyn Allen, Lauren Butler, Mikala Cann
Essendon	Natalie Wood	Steph Cain, Bonnie Toogood		Georgia Nanscawen, Maddy Prespakis, Jacqui Vogt
Fremantle	Lisa Webb	Hayley Miller	Angelique Stannett	Gabby O'Sullivan, Laura Pugh, Aine Tighe
Geelong	Daniel Lowther	Meg McDonald	Nina Morrison	Mikayla Bowen, Chantel Emonson, Becky Webster
Gold Coast	Cameron Joyce	Tara Bohanna	Jacqui Dupuy, Bess Keaney	Claudia Whitfort
Greater Western Sydney	Cameron Bernasconi	Alicia Eva		Rebecca Beeson, Tarni Evans, Georgia Garnett, Alyce Parker, Pepa Randall, Katherine Smith
Hawthorn	Bec Goddard	Tilly Lucas-Rodd	Emily Bates, Jasmine Fleming	Catherine Brown, Tamara Luke, Louise Stephenson
Melbourne	Mick Stinear	Kate Hore	Tyla Hanks	Libby Birch, Rhiannon Watt
North Melbourne	Darren Crocker	Emma Kearney	Nicole Bresnehan, Jasmine Garner	Bella Eddey, Emma King, Ash Riddell, Kate Shierlaw
Port Adelaide	Lauren Arnell	Erin Phillips	Janelle Cuthbertson, Ange Foley	Hannah Dunn, Justine Mules
Richmond	Ryan Ferguson	Katie Brennan	Gabby Seymour	Monique Conti, Sarah Hosking, Tessa Lavey, Rebecca Miller
St Kilda	Nick Dal Santo	Hannah Priest	Bianca Jakobsson	Steph Chiocci, Molly McDonald, Natalie Plane, Nicola Stevens, Hannah Stuart
Sydney	Scott Gowans	Lucy McEvoy, Chloe Molloy		
West Coast	Michael Prior	Emma Swanson	Bella Lewis	Dana Hooker, Aisling McCarthy, Jess Sedunary
Western Bulldogs	Nathan Burke	Ellie Blackburn	Bailey Hunt, Kirsty Lamb	Deanna Berry, Gabby Newton

== Pre-season ==
All starting times are local time. Source: afl.com.au (fixture; results/report)

	Official practice matches
Friday, 18 August (4:05 pm)	Greater Western Sydney 6.7 (43)	def.	Richmond 4.3 (27)	Blacktown ISP Oval
Friday, 18 August (7:10 pm)	Port Adelaide 9.4 (58)	def.	St Kilda 2.10 (22)	Alberton Oval
Saturday, 19 August (10:35 am)	Brisbane 7.8 (50)	def.	Gold Coast 0.2 (2)	Brighton Homes Arena
Saturday, 19 August (12:05 pm)	Western Bulldogs 2.2 (14)	def. by	North Melbourne 11.11 (77)	Arden Street Oval
Saturday, 19 August (11:05 am)	Fremantle 4.7 (31)	def.	Collingwood 4.6 (30)	Victor George Kailis Oval
Saturday, 19 August (1:05 pm)	Sydney 5.8 (38)	def.	Carlton 4.5 (29)	Sydney Cricket Ground
Saturday, 19 August (2:05 pm)	Melbourne 8.16 (64)	def.	Hawthorn 0.6 (6)	Casey Fields
Saturday, 19 August (4:10 pm)	Adelaide 8.8 (56)	def.	Geelong 7.8 (50)	Adelaide Oval
Sunday, 20 August (12:35 pm)	West Coast 6.7 (43)	def.	Essendon 5.4 (34)	Mineral Resources Park

== Home-and-away season ==
All starting times are local time. Source: afl.com.au

=== Round 1 ===
	Round 1
Friday, 1 September (7:20 pm)	Melbourne 10.13 (73)	def.	Collingwood 4.7 (31)	Ikon Park (crowd: 8,412)	Report; Stats
Saturday, 2 September (1:05 pm)	Carlton 5.4 (34)	def.	Gold Coast 4.8 (32)	Ikon Park (crowd: 3,244)	Report; Stats
Saturday, 2 September (2:35 pm)	Adelaide 8.10 (58)	def.	Port Adelaide 4.4 (28)	Norwood Oval (crowd: 8,722)	Report; Stats
Saturday, 2 September (5:05 pm)	Geelong 10.5 (65)	def.	Western Bulldogs 2.5 (17)	GMHBA Stadium (crowd: 4,404)	Report; Stats
Saturday, 2 September (7:15 pm)	Hawthorn 4.6 (30)	def. by	Essendon 7.7 (49)	Kinetic Stadium (crowd: 3,722)	Report; Stats
Sunday, 3 September (1:05 pm)	North Melbourne 8.8 (56)	def.	St Kilda 2.4 (16)	Blundstone Arena (crowd: 2,454)	Report; Stats
Sunday, 3 September (3:05 pm)	Brisbane 5.4 (34)	def. by	Richmond 6.4 (40)	Brighton Homes Arena (crowd: 3,153)	Report; Stats
Sunday, 3 September (3:05 pm)	Sydney 7.9 (51)	def.	Greater Western Sydney 7.4 (46)	North Sydney Oval (crowd: 5,474)	Report; Stats
Sunday, 3 September (3:05 pm)	Fremantle 4.3 (27)	def.	West Coast 2.7 (19)	Fremantle Community Bank Oval (crowd: 3,790)	Report; Stats
Sydney's win over Greater Western Sydney was its first AFLW win, after going winless in its inaugural season.

=== Round 2 ===
	Round 2
Friday, 8 September (5:05 pm)	Richmond 2.0 (12)	def. by	Adelaide 6.5 (41)	Ikon Park (crowd: 1,083)	Report; Stats
Saturday, 9 September (11:05 am)	Gold Coast 15.9 (99)	def.	West Coast 4.2 (26)	Heritage Bank Stadium (crowd: 1,071)	Report; Stats
Saturday, 9 September (12:35 pm)	Port Adelaide 4.2 (26)	def. by	Brisbane 11.10 (76)	Alberton Oval (crowd: 1,928)	Report; Stats
Saturday, 9 September (1:05 pm)	Sydney 5.11 (41)	def. by	Geelong 10.8 (68)	North Sydney Oval (crowd: 2,878)	Report; Stats
Sunday, 10 September (1:05 pm)	Western Bulldogs 5.9 (39)	def. by	Hawthorn 6.10 (46)	Mars Stadium (crowd: 1,564)	Report; Stats
Sunday, 10 September (1:05 pm)	Collingwood 7.4 (46)	def.	Fremantle 3.7 (25)	Victoria Park (crowd: 1,914)	Report; Stats
Sunday, 10 September (3:05 pm)	North Melbourne 10.6 (66)	def.	Carlton 1.0 (6)	Arden Street Oval (crowd: 2,788)	Report; Stats
Sunday, 10 September (3:05 pm)	Essendon 6.4 (40)	def.	St Kilda 4.4 (28)	Windy Hill (crowd: 3,195)	Report; Stats
Sunday, 10 September (5:05 pm)	Greater Western Sydney 3.4 (22)	def. by	Melbourne 15.9 (99)	Manuka Oval (crowd: 2,028)	Report; Stats
Gold Coast's score of 15.9 (99) against West Coast was its highest ever, more than doubling its previous highest score (49), which was surpassed before half-time; Jamie Stanton (Gold Coast) kicked a career-high six goals, in what was also her 50th AFLW match.; Gold Coast's winning margin of 73 points over West Coast was its biggest ever, more than doubling its previous biggest win (34 points).

=== Round 3 ===
	Round 3
Friday, 15 September (5:05 pm)	Geelong 3.4 (22)	def. by	North Melbourne 4.7 (31)	GMHBA Stadium (crowd: 2,907)	Report; Stats
Saturday, 16 September (1:35 pm)	Greater Western Sydney 5.4 (34)	def. by	Richmond 7.11 (53)	Blacktown ISP Oval (crowd: 1,051)	Report; Stats
Saturday, 16 September (2:35 pm)	Adelaide 12.9 (81)	def.	Essendon 5.4 (34)	Unley Oval (crowd: 2,238)	Report; Stats
Saturday, 16 September (3:05 pm)	Melbourne 12.11 (83)	def.	Western Bulldogs 6.5 (41)	Casey Fields (crowd: 1,457)	Report; Stats
Saturday, 16 September (3:05 pm)	Fremantle 5.5 (35)	def.	Hawthorn 3.4 (22)	Fremantle Community Bank Oval (crowd: 2,092)	Report; Stats
Sunday, 17 September (1:05 pm)	St Kilda 7.6 (48)	def. by	Port Adelaide 8.8 (56)	RSEA Park (crowd: 2,016)	Report; Stats
Sunday, 17 September (1:05 pm)	West Coast 3.6 (24)	def. by	Carlton 12.5 (77)	Mineral Resources Park (crowd: 1,208)	Report; Stats
Sunday, 17 September (3:05 pm)	Collingwood 2.9 (21)	def. by	Gold Coast 5.3 (33)	Victoria Park (crowd: 2,537)	Report; Stats
Sunday, 17 September (5:05 pm)	Brisbane 14.3 (87)	def.	Sydney 4.8 (32)	Brighton Homes Arena (crowd: 2,582)	Report; Stats
The start of the Greater Western Sydney v Richmond match was delayed by 30 minutes after a red-bellied black snake was found on the field leading into the match.; Melbourne's win over the Western Bulldogs was its twelfth consecutive win, a new AFLW record; it would win a further two consecutive matches to extend the record to 14, until it was surpassed by North Melbourne in 2025.

=== Round 4 ===
	Round 4
Friday, 22 September (5:05 pm)	Hawthorn 1.5 (11)	def. by	Melbourne 10.10 (70)	Kinetic Stadium (crowd: 2,817)	Report; Stats
Saturday, 23 September (11:05 am)	Greater Western Sydney 5.7 (37)	def. by	Adelaide 16.10 (106)	Manuka Oval (crowd: 1,809)	Report; Stats
Saturday, 23 September (1:05 pm)	Carlton 6.4 (40)	def. by	Richmond 7.5 (47)	Ikon Park (crowd: 2,304)	Report; Stats
Saturday, 23 September (12:35 pm)	Port Adelaide 5.12 (42)	def. by	Geelong 11.4 (70)	Alberton Oval (crowd: 2,132)	Report; Stats
Sunday, 24 September (1:05 pm)	Sydney 5.4 (34)	def.	West Coast 2.9 (21)	Henson Park (crowd: 4,595)	Report; Stats
Sunday, 24 September (1:05 pm)	North Melbourne 5.3 (33)	def. by	Brisbane 5.5 (35)	University of Tasmania Stadium (crowd: 1,093)	Report; Stats
Sunday, 24 September (3:05 pm)	Essendon 7.8 (50)	def.	Fremantle 4.6 (30)	Windy Hill (crowd: 2,822)	Report; Stats
Sunday, 24 September (3:05 pm)	St Kilda 7.5 (47)	def.	Collingwood 5.5 (35)	RSEA Park (crowd: 3,230)	Report; Stats
Sunday, 24 September (5:05 pm)	Gold Coast 7.6 (48)	def.	Western Bulldogs 7.2 (44)	Heritage Bank Stadium (crowd: 1,181)	Report; Stats
Adelaide's score of 16.10 (106) against Greater Western Sydney was its highest ever.

=== Round 5 ===
	Round 5
Thursday, 28 September (6:15 pm)	Geelong 4.1 (25)	def. by	Melbourne 11.8 (74)	GMHBA Stadium (crowd: 4,312)	Report; Stats
Friday, 29 September (1:05 pm)	Richmond 4.6 (30)	def. by	Fremantle 5.7 (37)	Ikon Park (crowd: 2,406)	Report; Stats
Friday, 29 September (4:05 pm)	Carlton 6.8 (44)	def.	Sydney 6.3 (39)	Ikon Park (crowd: 2,079)	Report; Stats
Friday, 29 September (7:15 pm)	Western Bulldogs 6.0 (36)	def. by	St Kilda 8.6 (54)	Whitten Oval (crowd: 2,807)	Report; Stats
Friday, 29 September (7:15 pm)	West Coast 6.3 (39)	def.	Port Adelaide 4.9 (33)	Mineral Resources Park (crowd: 1,134)	Report; Stats
Saturday, 30 September (11:05 am)	Collingwood 6.8 (44)	def.	Essendon 3.6 (24)	Punt Road Oval (crowd: 1,422)	Report; Stats
Sunday, 1 October (1:05 pm)	North Melbourne 4.8 (32)	def.	Greater Western Sydney 0.2 (2)	Arden Street Oval (crowd: 1,833)	Report; Stats
Sunday, 1 October (3:05 pm)	Hawthorn 5.2 (32)	def. by	Brisbane 8.11 (59)	Kinetic Stadium (crowd: 1,755)	Report; Stats
Sunday, 1 October (4:35 pm)	Adelaide 7.5 (47)	def.	Gold Coast 2.3 (15)	Unley Oval (crowd: 3,300)	Report; Stats
The Collingwood v Essendon match was originally scheduled to be played at AIA Centre, but was moved to Punt Road Oval so that AIA Centre could become a live site for the AFL Grand Final played later that day (in which Collingwood's AFL team was playing), where both the AFLW match and grand final could be streamed on big screens at the venue for fans to watch.; West Coast's win over Port Adelaide ended a ten-match losing streak.

=== Round 6 ===
	Round 6
Friday, 6 October (7:15 pm)	Western Bulldogs 4.10 (34)	def. by	Carlton 8.5 (53)	Whitten Oval (crowd: 2,163)	Report; Stats
Saturday, 7 October (1:05 pm)	Greater Western Sydney 6.8 (44)	def.	West Coast 3.6 (24)	Blacktown ISP Oval (crowd: 927)	Report; Stats
Saturday, 7 October (3:05 pm)	Melbourne 7.4 (46)	def. by	Adelaide 8.8 (56)	Casey Fields (crowd: 1,975)	Report; Stats
Saturday, 7 October (3:05 pm)	St Kilda 7.3 (45)	def.	Hawthorn 5.6 (36)	RSEA Park (crowd: 2,812)	Report; Stats
Saturday, 7 October (4:35 pm)	Port Adelaide 3.12 (30)	def. by	Sydney 6.9 (45)	Alberton Oval (crowd: 2,597)	Report; Stats
Saturday, 7 October (6:15 pm)	Brisbane 3.10 (28)	def. by	Collingwood 5.3 (33)	Brighton Homes Arena (crowd: 3,276)	Report; Stats
Sunday, 8 October (1:05 pm)	Essendon 4.5 (29)	def.	Geelong 2.7 (19)	Reid Oval (crowd: 2,832)	Report; Stats
Sunday, 8 October (3:05 pm)	Richmond 5.5 (35)	def. by	Gold Coast 5.6 (36)	Ikon Park (crowd: 1,848)	Report; Stats
Sunday, 8 October (2:05 pm)	Fremantle 3.3 (21)	def. by	North Melbourne 10.6 (66)	Fremantle Community Bank Oval (crowd: 2,022)	Report; Stats
Melbourne's loss to Adelaide ended a 14-match winning streak.

=== Round 7 ===
	Round 7 (Indigenous Round week 1)
Friday, 13 October (6:45 pm)	Adelaide 9.5 (59)	def.	Western Bulldogs 2.5 (17)	Norwood Oval (crowd: 2,745)	Report; Stats
Saturday, 14 October (1:05 pm)	St Kilda 7.6 (48)	def.	Greater Western Sydney 5.5 (35)	RSEA Park (crowd: 1,402)	Report; Stats
Saturday, 14 October (3:05 pm)	Geelong 6.11 (47)	def.	Fremantle 3.5 (23)	GMHBA Stadium (crowd: 2,166)	Report; Stats
Saturday, 14 October (3:05 pm)	Sydney 3.8 (26)	def. by	Hawthorn 5.10 (40)	Henson Park (crowd: 4,514)	Report; Stats
Saturday, 14 October (4:05 pm)	Gold Coast 3.3 (21)	def. by	Brisbane 8.9 (57)	Heritage Bank Stadium (crowd: 1,873)	Report; Stats
Saturday, 14 October (7:20 pm)	Richmond 5.6 (36)	def. by	Essendon 8.5 (53)	Ikon Park (crowd: 2,847)	Report; Stats
Sunday, 15 October (1:05 pm)	North Melbourne 13.9 (87)	def.	Port Adelaide 3.6 (24)	Arden Street Oval (crowd: 1,912)	Report; Stats
Sunday, 15 October (3:05 pm)	Carlton 1.4 (10)	def. by	Collingwood 4.3 (27)	Ikon Park (crowd: 3,111)	Report; Stats
Sunday, 15 October (2:05 pm)	West Coast 2.0 (12)	def. by	Melbourne 11.16 (82)	Mineral Resources Park (crowd: 1,232)	Report; Stats
North Melbourne's score of 13.9 (87) against Port Adelaide was its highest ever.

=== Round 8 ===
	Round 8 (Indigenous Round week 2)
Friday, 20 October (6:45 pm)	Hawthorn 4.6 (30)	def. by	Richmond 6.5 (41)	Cazalys Stadium (crowd: 1,933)	Report; Stats
Saturday, 21 October (1:05 pm)	Western Bulldogs 6.3 (39)	def. by	Sydney 14.12 (96)	Whitten Oval (crowd: 2,982)	Report; Stats
Saturday, 21 October (2:05 pm)	Brisbane 5.12 (42)	def.	Adelaide 6.3 (39)	Brighton Homes Arena (crowd: 2,544)	Report; Stats
Saturday, 21 October (3:05 pm)	Greater Western Sydney 8.1 (49)	def.	Carlton 7.5 (47)	Henson Park (crowd: 1,574)	Report; Stats
Saturday, 21 October (4:35 pm)	Port Adelaide 7.3 (45)	drew with	Gold Coast 7.3 (45)	Alberton Oval (crowd: 1,853)	Report; Stats
Saturday, 21 October (7:15 pm)	Melbourne 5.7 (37)	def.	North Melbourne 2.2 (14)	Ikon Park (crowd: 2,704)	Report; Stats
Sunday, 22 October (1:05 pm)	Collingwood 4.6 (30)	def.	Geelong 3.6 (24)	Victoria Park (crowd: 2,527)	Report; Stats
Sunday, 22 October (12:05 pm)	Fremantle 6.9 (45)	def.	St Kilda 3.3 (21)	Fremantle Community Bank Oval (crowd: 1,850)	Report; Stats
Sunday, 22 October (5:05 pm)	Essendon 2.7 (19)	def. by	West Coast 3.5 (23)	Windy Hill (crowd: 2,108)	Report; Stats
Sydney's score of 14.12 (96) against the Western Bulldogs was its highest ever, surpassing its previous highest score (51) before half-time; it was also the highest score ever conceded by the Western Bulldogs.; 208 tackles were recorded in the Essendon v West Coast match, an AFLW record.

=== Round 9 ===
	Round 9
Friday, 27 October (6:45 pm)	Gold Coast 7.6 (48)	def.	Greater Western Sydney 2.5 (17)	Heritage Bank Stadium (crowd: 1,045)	Report; Stats
Saturday, 28 October (1:05 pm)	Melbourne 8.13 (61)	def.	Fremantle 4.4 (28)	Casey Fields (crowd: 1,650)	Report; Stats
Saturday, 28 October (3:05 pm)	St Kilda 8.7 (55)	def.	Brisbane 5.4 (34)	RSEA Park (crowd: 2,005)	Report; Stats
Saturday, 28 October (3:05 pm)	Essendon 8.8 (56)	def.	Carlton 3.6 (24)	Windy Hill (crowd: 3,812)	Report; Stats
Saturday, 28 October (2:05 pm)	West Coast 5.6 (36)	def. by	Western Bulldogs 6.8 (44)	Mineral Resources Park (crowd: 1,447)	Report; Stats
Saturday, 28 October (7:15 pm)	Richmond 1.5 (11)	def. by	Geelong 6.13 (49)	Ikon Park (crowd: 2,021)	Report; Stats
Sunday, 29 October (1:05 pm)	Sydney 9.4 (58)	def.	Collingwood 5.9 (39)	Henson Park (crowd: 5,722)	Report; Stats
Sunday, 29 October (2:35 pm)	Adelaide 6.5 (41)	def.	North Melbourne 5.8 (38)	Norwood Oval (crowd: 3,362)	Report; Stats
Sunday, 29 October (5:05 pm)	Hawthorn 6.4 (40)	def.	Port Adelaide 5.2 (32)	Kinetic Stadium (crowd: 1,771)	Report; Stats
The Adelaide v North Melbourne match was originally scheduled to be played at Unley Oval, but was moved to Norwood Oval after the former was closed by Unley Council to allow for a complete redevelopment of its playing surface.

=== Round 10 ===
	Round 10 (Pride Round)
Friday, 3 November (6:45 pm)	Gold Coast 6.3 (39)	def.	Essendon 3.7 (25)	Great Barrier Reef Arena (crowd: 2,131)	Report; Stats
Saturday, 4 November (1:05 pm)	Western Bulldogs 1.3 (9)	def. by	North Melbourne 7.13 (55)	Whitten Oval (crowd: 2,608)	Report; Stats
Saturday, 4 November (2:35 pm)	Port Adelaide 13.10 (88)	def.	Greater Western Sydney 4.6 (30)	Alberton Oval (crowd: 3,353)	Report; Stats
Saturday, 4 November (5:05 pm)	Geelong 9.6 (60)	def.	Hawthorn 3.2 (20)	GMHBA Stadium (crowd: 3,658)	Report; Stats
Saturday, 4 November (2:05 pm)	West Coast 6.9 (45)	def. by	Adelaide 11.5 (71)	Mineral Resources Park (crowd: 938)	Report; Stats
Saturday, 4 November (6:05 pm)	Brisbane 8.5 (53)	def.	Melbourne 4.4 (28)	Brighton Homes Arena (crowd: 3,004)	Report; Stats
Sunday, 5 November (1:05 pm)	Carlton 3.8 (26)	def. by	St Kilda 7.4 (46)	Ikon Park (crowd: 2,649)	Report; Stats
Sunday, 5 November (3:05 pm)	Collingwood 4.1 (25)	def. by	Richmond 11.11 (77)	Victoria Park (crowd: 3,948)	Report; Stats
Sunday, 5 November (2:05 pm)	Fremantle 2.6 (18)	def. by	Sydney 5.10 (40)	Fremantle Community Bank Oval (crowd: 2,271)	Report; Stats
Port Adelaide's score of 13.10 (88) against Greater Western Sydney was its highest ever.; Richmond's score of 11.11 (77) against Collingwood was its highest ever, and its winning margin of 52 points was its biggest ever.

== Ladder ==
Pos	Team	Pld	W	L	D	PF	PA	PP	Pts	Qualification
1	Adelaide	10	9	1	0	599	314	190.8	36	Finals series
2	Melbourne	10	8	2	0	653	293	222.9	32	Finals series
3	North Melbourne	10	7	3	0	478	213	224.4	28	Finals series
4	Brisbane (P)	10	7	3	0	505	339	149.0	28	Finals series
5	Gold Coast	10	6	3	1	416	351	118.5	26	Finals series
6	Geelong	10	6	4	0	449	318	141.2	24	Finals series
7	Essendon	10	6	4	0	379	354	107.1	24	Finals series
8	Sydney	10	6	4	0	462	432	106.9	24	Finals series
9	St Kilda	10	6	4	0	408	399	102.3	24	
10	Richmond	10	5	5	0	382	379	100.8	20	
11	Collingwood	10	5	5	0	331	399	83.0	20	
12	Carlton	10	4	6	0	361	420	86.0	16	
13	Fremantle	10	4	6	0	289	402	71.9	16	
14	Hawthorn	10	3	7	0	307	456	67.3	12	
15	Port Adelaide	10	2	7	1	404	538	75.1	10	
16	Greater Western Sydney	10	2	8	0	316	596	53.0	8	
17	West Coast	10	2	8	0	269	530	50.8	8	
18	Western Bulldogs	10	1	9	0	320	595	53.8	4	

Source: afl.com.au
Rules for classification: 1) points; 2) percentage; 3) number of points for
(P) Premiers

== Progression by round ==
4	Finished the round in first place	0	Finished the round in last place
4	Won the minor premiership	0	Finished the season in last place
4	Finished the round inside the top eight		
4_{1}	Subscript indicates the ladder position at the end of the round		

Team	1	2	3	4	5	6	7	8	9	10
Adelaide	4_{4}	8_{3}	12_{3}	16_{2}	20_{2}	24_{1}	28_{1}	28_{2}	32_{2}	36_{1}
Melbourne	4_{3}	8_{2}	12_{2}	16_{1}	20_{1}	20_{3}	24_{3}	28_{1}	32_{1}	32_{2}
North Melbourne	4_{2}	8_{1}	12_{1}	12_{3}	16_{3}	20_{2}	24_{2}	24_{3}	24_{3}	28_{3}
Brisbane	0_{12}	4_{7}	8_{5}	12_{4}	16_{4}	16_{4}	20_{4}	24_{4}	24_{4}	28_{4}
Gold Coast	0_{10}	4_{6}	8_{4}	12_{6}	12_{5}	16_{5}	16_{7}	18_{7}	22_{6}	26_{5}
Geelong	4_{1}	8_{4}	8_{6}	12_{5}	12_{6}	12_{8}	16_{6}	16_{8}	20_{7}	24_{6}
Essendon	4_{5}	8_{5}	8_{10}	12_{7}	12_{9}	16_{7}	20_{5}	20_{5}	24_{5}	24_{7}
Sydney	4_{8}	4_{9}	4_{13}	8_{11}	8_{13}	12_{12}	12_{12}	16_{10}	20_{8}	24_{8}
St Kilda	0_{17}	0_{15}	0_{15}	4_{13}	8_{12}	12_{10}	16_{10}	16_{12}	20_{9}	24_{9}
Richmond	4_{7}	4_{12}	8_{8}	12_{8}	12_{7}	12_{9}	12_{11}	16_{11}	16_{12}	20_{10}
Collingwood	0_{16}	4_{11}	4_{12}	4_{12}	8_{11}	12_{11}	16_{8}	20_{6}	20_{10}	20_{11}
Carlton	4_{9}	4_{13}	8_{9}	8_{9}	12_{8}	16_{6}	16_{9}	16_{9}	16_{11}	16_{12}
Fremantle	4_{6}	4_{10}	8_{7}	8_{10}	12_{10}	12_{13}	12_{13}	16_{13}	16_{13}	16_{13}
Hawthorn	0_{14}	4_{8}	4_{11}	4_{15}	4_{15}	4_{15}	8_{14}	8_{14}	12_{14}	12_{14}
Port Adelaide	0_{15}	0_{17}	4_{14}	4_{14}	4_{14}	4_{14}	4_{15}	6_{17}	6_{17}	10_{15}
Greater Western Sydney	0_{11}	0_{16}	0_{16}	0_{17}	0_{18}	4_{16}	4_{16}	8_{15}	8_{15}	8_{16}
West Coast	0_{13}	0_{18}	0_{18}	0_{18}	4_{16}	4_{17}	4_{17}	8_{16}	8_{16}	8_{17}
Western Bulldogs	0_{18}	0_{14}	0_{17}	0_{16}	0_{17}	0_{18}	0_{18}	0_{18}	4_{18}	4_{18}

Source: Australian Football

== Home match attendance ==
The following table includes all home match attendance figures from the home-and-away season.

Team	Hosted	Total	Highest	Lowest	Average		
Team	Hosted	Total	Highest	Lowest	2022 (S7)	2023	Change
Adelaide	5	20,367	8,722	2,238	2,540	4,073	▲1,533
Brisbane	5	14,559	3,276	2,544	1,888	2,912	▲1,024
Carlton	5	13,387	3,244	2,079	2,097	2,677	▲580
Collingwood	5	12,348	3,948	1,422	1,954	2,470	▲516
Essendon	5	14,769	3,812	2,108	4,868	2,954	▼1,914
Fremantle	5	12,025	3,790	1,850	1,415	2,405	▲990
Geelong	5	17,447	4,404	2,166	2,548	3,489	▲941
Gold Coast	5	7,301	2,131	1,045	1,017	1,460	▲443
Greater Western Sydney	5	7,389	2,028	927	1,546	1,478	▼68
Hawthorn	5	11,998	3,722	1,755	1,826	2,400	▲574
Melbourne	5	16,198	8,412	1,457	4,601	3,240	▼1,361
North Melbourne	5	10,080	2,788	1,093	1,829	2,016	▲187
Port Adelaide	5	11,863	3,353	1,853	6,735	2,373	▼4,362
Richmond	5	10,205	2,847	1,083	1,707	2,041	▲334
St Kilda	5	11,465	3,230	1,402	1,850	2,293	▲443
Sydney	5	23,183	5,722	2,878	3,773	4,637	▲864
West Coast	5	5,959	1,447	938	2,483	1,192	▼1,291
Western Bulldogs	5	12,124	2,982	1,564	1,690	2,425	▲735
Total/overall	90	232,667	8,722	927	2,748	2,585	▼163

Source: Australian Football

== Finals series ==
Qualifying and elimination finals
11 November, Norwood Oval
1	Adelaide	5.7 (37)
4	Brisbane	6.3 (39)
11 November, Heritage Bank Stadium
5	Gold Coast	6.5 (41)
8	Sydney	9.4 (58)
12 November, GMHBA Stadium
6	Geelong	7.9 (51)
7	Essendon	5.3 (33)
12 November, Ikon Park
2	Melbourne	1.3 (9)
3	North Melbourne	7.8 (50)

Semi-finals
18 November, Norwood Oval
Adelaide	12.10 (82)
Sydney	2.3 (15)
19 November, Ikon Park
Melbourne	6.9 (45)
Geelong	7.8 (50)

Preliminary finals
25 November, Brighton Homes Arena
Brisbane	6.2 (38)
Geelong	5.4 (34)
26 November, Ikon Park
North Melbourne	4.8 (32)
Adelaide	4.7 (31)

Grand final
3 December, Ikon Park
North Melbourne	4.3 (27)
Brisbane	7.2 (44)

All starting times are local time. Source: afl.com.au

=== Finals week 1 ===
First qualifying final
Saturday, 11 November (2:35 pm)	Adelaide 5.7 (37)	def. by	Brisbane 6.3 (39)	Norwood Oval (crowd: 4,209)	Report; Stats
1.0 (6); 4.0 (24); 5.3 (33); 5.7 (37)	Q1; Q2; Q3; Q4	2.3 (15); 3.3 (21); 5.3 (33); 6.3 (39)
Jones 4, Kelly	Goals	Davidson 2, O'Dwyer 2, Anderson, Smith
Jones, Marinoff, Hatchard, Randall, Biddell	Best	O'Dwyer, Anderson, Hodder, Dawes, Davidson, Ellenger

First elimination final
Saturday, 11 November (6:15 pm)	Gold Coast 6.5 (41)	def. by	Sydney 9.4 (58)	Heritage Bank Stadium (crowd: 2,710)	Report; Stats
1.0 (6); 3.0 (18); 5.3 (33); 6.5 (41)	Q1; Q2; Q3; Q4	4.2 (26); 7.2 (44); 9.3 (57); 9.4 (58)
Bohanna 4, Dupuy, Girvan	Goals	Molloy 3, McEvoy 2, C. Hamilton, Newman, Privitelli, Whelan
Bohanna, Drennan, Keaney, Single	Best	Molloy, Hurley, Kennedy, Gardiner, Ham, C. Hamilton

Second elimination final
Sunday, 12 November (1:05 pm)	Geelong 7.9 (51)	def.	Essendon 5.3 (33)	GMHBA Stadium (crowd: 6,678)	Report; Stats
3.4 (22); 7.7 (49); 7.9 (51); 7.9 (51)	Q1; Q2; Q3; Q4	0.1 (1); 2.1 (13); 2.1 (13); 5.3 (33)
A. Moloney 2, Crockett-Grills, A. McDonald, Parry, G. Prespakis, Scheer	Goals	M. Prespakis 2, Alexander, Gamble, Toogood
G. Prespakis, A. McDonald, A. Moloney, Webster, Morrison, Parry	Best	M. Prespakis, Nanscawen, Toogood, Alexander

Second qualifying final
Sunday, 12 November (3:05 pm)	Melbourne 1.3 (9)	def. by	North Melbourne 7.8 (50)	Ikon Park (crowd: 5,431)	Report; Stats
0.1 (1); 0.1 (1); 0.2 (2); 1.3 (9)	Q1; Q2; Q3; Q4	1.4 (10); 2.4 (16); 5.6 (36); 7.8 (50)
Bannan	Goals	Randall 3, Eddey 2, E. King, O'Loughlin
Hanks, Purcell, Hore, Goldrick, Gay	Best	Garner, Riddell, Kearney, Randall, Wright, Pullar

=== Finals week 2 ===
First semi-final
Saturday, 18 November (7:15 pm)	Adelaide 12.10 (82)	def.	Sydney 2.3 (15)	Norwood Oval (crowd: 4,688)	Report; Stats
2.2 (14); 5.5 (35); 8.5 (53); 12.10 (82)	Q1; Q2; Q3; Q4	1.0 (6); 2.0 (12); 2.3 (15); 2.3 (15)
Bonner 2, Hatchard 2, Randall 2, Waterhouse 2, Gould, Jones, M. Newman, Ponter	Goals	Molloy, A. Newman
Hatchard, Marinoff, Randall, J. Allan, Ponter, Kelly	Best	Gardiner, Molloy, Heads, Tarrant

Second semi-final
Sunday, 19 November (3:05 pm)	Melbourne 6.9 (45)	def. by	Geelong 7.8 (50)	Ikon Park (crowd: 5,057)	Report; Stats
0.2 (2); 1.4 (10); 1.7 (13); 6.9 (45)	Q1; Q2; Q3; Q4	2.4 (16); 4.5 (29); 6.7 (43); 7.8 (50)
Zanker 3, Gay, Hanks, A. Mackin	Goals	A. McDonald 2, Crockett-Grills, Darby, A. Moloney, Parry, Scott
Hanks, West, Zanker, Pearce, Paxman, Gay	Best	Morrison, Webster, A. McDonald, M. McDonald, Parry, Darby

=== Finals week 3 ===
First preliminary final
Saturday, 25 November (6:45 pm)	Brisbane 6.2 (38)	def.	Geelong 5.4 (34)	Brighton Homes Arena (crowd: 4,903)	Report; Stats
2.1 (13); 4.2 (26); 5.2 (32); 6.2 (38)	Q1; Q2; Q3; Q4	0.1 (1); 3.3 (21); 4.4 (28); 5.4 (34)
Davidson 2, Campbell, Hodder, Mullins, O'Dwyer	Goals	Parry 2, A. Moloney, Scheer, Scott
Anderson, O'Dwyer, Ellenger, Dawes, C. Svarc, Koenen	Best	Prespakis, D. Moloney, Morrison, Kearns, Gunjaca

Second preliminary final
Sunday, 26 November (3:05 pm)	North Melbourne 4.8 (32)	def.	Adelaide 4.7 (31)	Ikon Park (crowd: 5,163)	Report; Stats
2.1 (13); 3.2 (20); 4.4 (28); 4.8 (32)	Q1; Q2; Q3; Q4	1.2 (8); 1.5 (11); 3.7 (25); 4.7 (31)
Randall 2, Garner, Shierlaw	Goals	Ponter 3, Hatchard
Bruton, Garner, Riddell, Pullar, Wright	Best	Marinoff, Ponter, Thompson, Biddell, Hatchard

=== Grand final ===
Grand final
Sunday, 3 December (2:30 pm)	North Melbourne 4.3 (27)	def. by	Brisbane 7.2 (44)	Ikon Park (crowd: 12,616)	Report; Stats
1.0 (6); 2.2 (14); 4.3 (27); 4.3 (27)	Q1; Q2; Q3; Q4	0.0 (0); 2.1 (13); 3.2 (20); 7.2 (44)	Best on ground: Breanna Koenen (Brisbane); Field umpires: Matt Adams, Joel Clamp, Samuel Nippress; National anthem: Vera Blue
Garner 2, O'Loughlin, Shierlaw	Goals	Davidson 2, Hampson 2, Koenen, Mullins, O'Dwyer
Garner, M. King, Riddell, Rennie, Kearney	Best	Koenen, Dawes, Anderson, Grider, Hodder
Three female umpires (goal umpires Georgia Henderson and Emilie Hill and boundary umpire Greta Miller) officiated an AFL Women's Grand Final for the first time.; Brisbane recorded 109 tackles in the grand final against North Melbourne, an AFLW record.

== Win–loss table ==
The following table can be sorted from biggest winning margin to biggest losing margin for each round. If two or more matches in a round are decided by the same margin, these margins are sorted by percentage (i.e. the lowest-scoring winning team is ranked highest and the lowest-scoring losing team is ranked lowest). Home matches are in bold, and opponents are listed above the margins.

+	Win		Qualified for finals
−	Loss		Eliminated
	Draw	X	Bye

Team	Home-and-away season										Ladder	Finals series			
Team	1	2	3	4	5	6	7	8	9	10	Ladder	F1	F2	F3	GF
Adelaide	**PA** **+30**	RIC +29	**ESS** **+47**	GWS +69	**GC** **+32**	MEL +10	**WB** **+42**	BRI −3	**NM** **+3**	WC +26	1 (9–1–0)	**BRI** **−2**	**SYD** **+67**	NM −1	
Brisbane	**RIC** **−6**	PA +50	**SYD** **+55**	NM +2	HAW +27	**COL** **−5**	GC +36	**ADE** **+3**	STK −21	**MEL** **+25**	4 (7–3–0)	ADE +2	X	**GEE** **+4**	NM +17
Carlton	**GC** **+2**	NM −60	WC +53	**RIC** **−7**	**SYD** **+5**	WB +19	**COL** **−17**	GWS −2	ESS −32	**STK** **−20**	12 (4–6–0)				
Collingwood	MEL −42	**FRE** **+21**	**GC** **−12**	STK −12	**ESS** **+20**	BRI +5	CAR +17	**GEE** **+6**	SYD −19	**RIC** **−52**	11 (5–5–0)				
Essendon	HAW +19	**STK** **+12**	ADE −47	**FRE** **+20**	COL −20	**GEE** **+10**	RIC +17	**WC** **−4**	**CAR** **+32**	GC −14	7 (6–4–0)	GEE −18			
Fremantle	**WC** **+8**	COL −21	**HAW** **+13**	ESS −20	RIC +7	**NM** **−45**	GEE −24	**STK** **+24**	MEL −33	**SYD** **−22**	13 (4–6–0)				
Geelong	**WB** **+48**	SYD +27	**NM** **−9**	PA +28	**MEL** **−49**	ESS −10	**FRE** **+24**	COL −6	RIC +38	**HAW** **+40**	6 (6–4–0)	**ESS** **+18**	MEL +5	BRI −4	
Gold Coast	CAR −2	**WC** **+73**	COL +12	**WB** **+4**	ADE −32	RIC +1	**BRI** **−36**	PA; 0	**GWS** **+31**	**ESS** **+14**	5 (6–3–1)	**SYD** **−17**			
Greater Western Sydney	SYD −5	**MEL** **−77**	**RIC** **−19**	**ADE** **−69**	NM −30	**WC** **+20**	STK −13	**CAR** **+2**	GC −31	PA −58	16 (2–8–0)				
Hawthorn	**ESS** **−19**	WB +7	FRE −13	**MEL** **−59**	**BRI** **−27**	STK −9	SYD +14	**RIC** **−11**	**PA** **+8**	GEE −40	14 (3–7–0)				
Melbourne	**COL** **+42**	GWS +77	**WB** **+42**	HAW +59	GEE +49	**ADE** **−10**	WC +70	**NM** **+23**	**FRE** **+33**	BRI −25	2 (8–2–0)	**NM** **−41**	**GEE** **−5**		
North Melbourne	**STK** **+40**	**CAR** **+60**	GEE +9	**BRI** **−2**	**GWS** **+30**	FRE +45	**PA** **+63**	MEL −23	ADE −3	WB +46	3 (7–3–0)	MEL +41	X	**ADE** **+1**	**BRI** **−17**
Port Adelaide	ADE −30	**BRI** **−50**	STK +8	**GEE** **−28**	WC −6	**SYD** **−15**	NM −63	**GC**; **0**	HAW −8	**GWS** **+58**	15 (2–7–1)				
Richmond	BRI +6	**ADE** **−29**	GWS +19	CAR +7	**FRE** **−7**	**GC** **−1**	**ESS** **−17**	HAW +14	**GEE** **−38**	COL +52	10 (5–5–0)				
St Kilda	NM −40	ESS −12	**PA** **−8**	**COL** **+12**	WB +18	**HAW** **+9**	**GWS** **+13**	FRE −24	**BRI** **+21**	CAR +20	9 (6–4–0)				
Sydney	**GWS** **+5**	**GEE** **−27**	BRI −55	**WC** **+13**	CAR −5	PA +15	**HAW** **−14**	WB +57	**COL** **+19**	FRE +22	8 (6–4–0)	GC +17	ADE −67		
West Coast	FRE −8	GC −73	**CAR** **−53**	SYD −13	**PA** **+6**	GWS −20	**MEL** **−70**	ESS +4	**WB** **−8**	**ADE** **−26**	17 (2–8–0)				
Western Bulldogs	GEE −48	**HAW** **−7**	MEL −42	GC −4	**STK** **−18**	**CAR** **−19**	ADE −42	**SYD** **−57**	WC +8	**NM** **−46**	18 (1–9–0)				

Source: Australian Football

== Season notes ==
- Round 3 was the highest-scoring round in AFLW history.
- Greater Western Sydney and the Western Bulldogs recorded their worst ever starts to an AFLW season, losing their first five and eight matches, respectively.
- Melbourne teammates Eden Zanker (round 9) and Kate Hore (round 10) became the first players to kick 20 goals in an AFLW home-and-away season; both players finished with 20 goals to lead the league goalkicking for the home-and-away season, becoming the first shared winners of the award.
- Despite averaging the highest score in AFLW history during the season, Melbourne was eliminated from the finals in straight sets, losing three consecutive matches for the first time in its history in the process.

== Milestones ==
Round	Player	Club	Milestone	Ref.
1	Tyla Hanks	Melbourne	50th AFLW game	
1	Elle Bennetts	Western Bulldogs	50th AFLW game	
1	Georgia Gee	Essendon	50th AFLW game	
1	Jesse Wardlaw	St Kilda	50th AFLW game	
2	Chelsea Randall	Adelaide	50th AFLW game	
2	Jamie Stanton	Gold Coast	50th AFLW game	
2	Dana Hooker	West Coast	50th AFLW game	
2	Sophie Conway	Brisbane	50th AFLW game	
2	Aliesha Newman	Sydney	50th AFLW game	
2	Phoebe McWilliams	Carlton	50th AFLW game	
2	Nicola Barr	Greater Western Sydney	50th AFLW game	
3	Danielle Ponter	Adelaide	50th AFLW goal	
3	Bonnie Toogood	Essendon	50th AFLW game	
3	Jess Wuetschner	Essendon	50th AFLW game	
3	Angelique Stannett	Fremantle	50th AFLW game	
3	Bianca Jakobsson	St Kilda	50th AFLW game	
3	Brittany Bonnici	Collingwood	50th AFLW game	
3	Phoebe Monahan	Brisbane	50th AFLW game	
3	Chloe Molloy	Sydney	50th AFLW game	
4	Ashleigh Saint	Port Adelaide	50th AFLW goal	
4	Meg McDonald	Geelong	50th AFLW game	
4	Kim Rennie	North Melbourne	50th AFLW game	
5	Maddi Gay	Melbourne	50th AFLW game	
5	Brooke Lochland	Sydney	50th AFLW game	
5	Jesse Wardlaw	St Kilda	50th AFLW goal	
5	Emma Swanson	West Coast	50th AFLW game	
5	Gemma Houghton	Port Adelaide	50th AFLW goal	
5	Katherine Smith	Greater Western Sydney	50th AFLW game	
5	Danielle Ponter	Adelaide	50th AFLW game	
6	Madeline Keryk	Port Adelaide	50th AFLW game	
6	Nat Grider	Brisbane	50th AFLW game	
6	Mikala Cann	Collingwood	50th AFLW game	
6	Maddy Prespakis	Essendon	50th AFLW game	
7	Chantel Emonson	Geelong	50th AFLW game	
7	Belle Dawes	Brisbane	50th AFLW game	
7	Cathy Svarc	Brisbane	50th AFLW game	
7	Ash Riddell	North Melbourne	50th AFLW game	
7	Kate Shierlaw	North Melbourne	50th AFLW game	
7	Sarah Rowe	Collingwood	50th AFLW game	
8	Greta Bodey	Hawthorn	50th AFLW game	
8	Katie Brennan	Richmond	50th AFLW game	
8	Orla O'Dwyer	Brisbane	50th AFLW game	
8	Jordyn Allen	Collingwood	50th AFLW game	
8	Julia Crockett-Grills	Geelong	50th AFLW game	
8	Laura Pugh	Fremantle	50th AFLW game	
9	Alison Drennan	Gold Coast	50th AFLW game	
9	Pepa Randall	Greater Western Sydney	50th AFLW game	
9	Shelley Heath	Melbourne	50th AFLW game	
9	Ally Anderson	Brisbane	75th AFLW game	
9	Sophie Alexander	Essendon	50th AFLW game	
9	Bonnie Toogood	Essendon	50th AFLW goal	
9	Stephen Symonds	Collingwood	50th AFLW game coached	
9	Ebony Marinoff	Adelaide	75th AFLW game	
9	Emily Bates	Hawthorn	75th AFLW game	
10	Sophie Van De Heuvel	Essendon	50th AFLW game	
10	Bailey Hunt	Western Bulldogs	50th AFLW game	
10	Rebecca Beeson	Greater Western Sydney	50th AFLW game	
10	Jasmine Grierson	Greater Western Sydney	50th AFLW game	
10	Chloe Scheer	Geelong	50th AFLW goal	
10	Kellie Gibson	West Coast	50th AFLW game	
10	Craig Starcevich	Brisbane	75th AFLW game coached	
10	Libby Birch	Melbourne	75th AFLW game	
10	Chloe Molloy	Sydney	50th AFLW goal	
F1	Breanna Koenen	Brisbane	75th AFLW game	
F1	Dakota Davidson	Brisbane	50th AFLW goal	
F1	Lauren Bella	Gold Coast	50th AFLW game	
F2	Mick Stinear	Melbourne	75th AFLW game coached	
F2	Olivia Purcell	Melbourne	50th AFLW game	
F3	Dakota Davidson	Brisbane	50th AFLW game	
F3	Rebecca Webster	Geelong	50th AFLW game	
F3	Tahlia Randall	North Melbourne	75th AFLW game	
GF	Jasmine Garner	North Melbourne	75th AFLW game	
GF	Shannon Campbell	Brisbane	75th AFLW game	
GF	Jade Ellenger	Brisbane	50th AFLW game	
GF	Tahlia Hickie	Brisbane	50th AFLW game	

== Coach departures ==
Outgoing coach	Club	Manner of departure	Date of departure	Caretaker coach	Incoming coach	Date of appointment
Michael Prior	West Coast	Stepped down mid-season	25 October 2023	Rohan McHugh	Daisy Pearce	11 December 2023
Stephen Symonds	Collingwood	Mutually parted ways	8 November 2023	—	Sam Wright	22 December 2023
Nathan Burke	Western Bulldogs	Dismissed with one year remaining on contract	15 November 2023	—	Tamara Hyett	16 February 2024
Bec Goddard	Hawthorn	Retired from coaching	17 November 2023	—	Daniel Webster	5 February 2024

== Awards ==
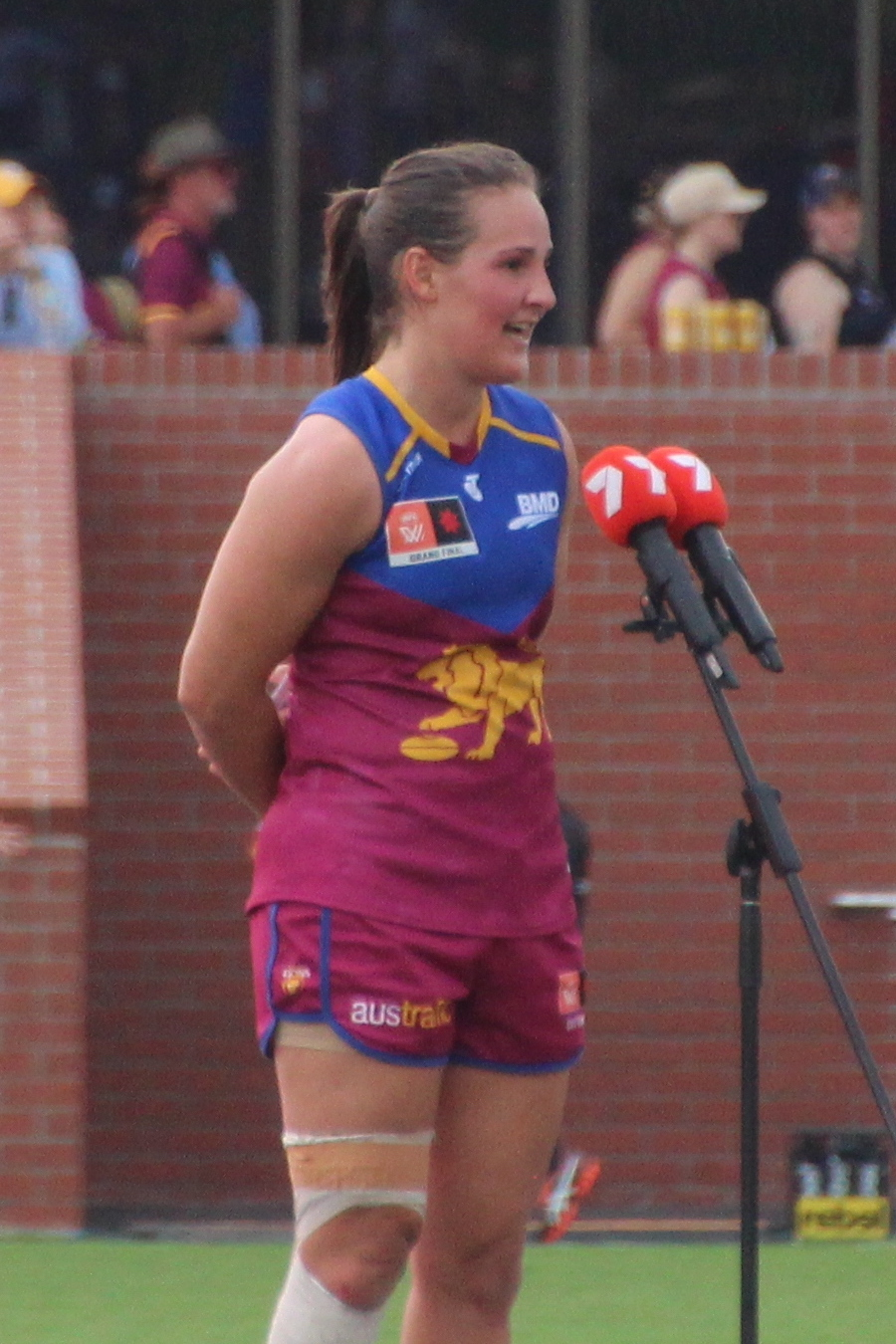
Brisbane captain Breanna Koenen, grand final best-on-ground

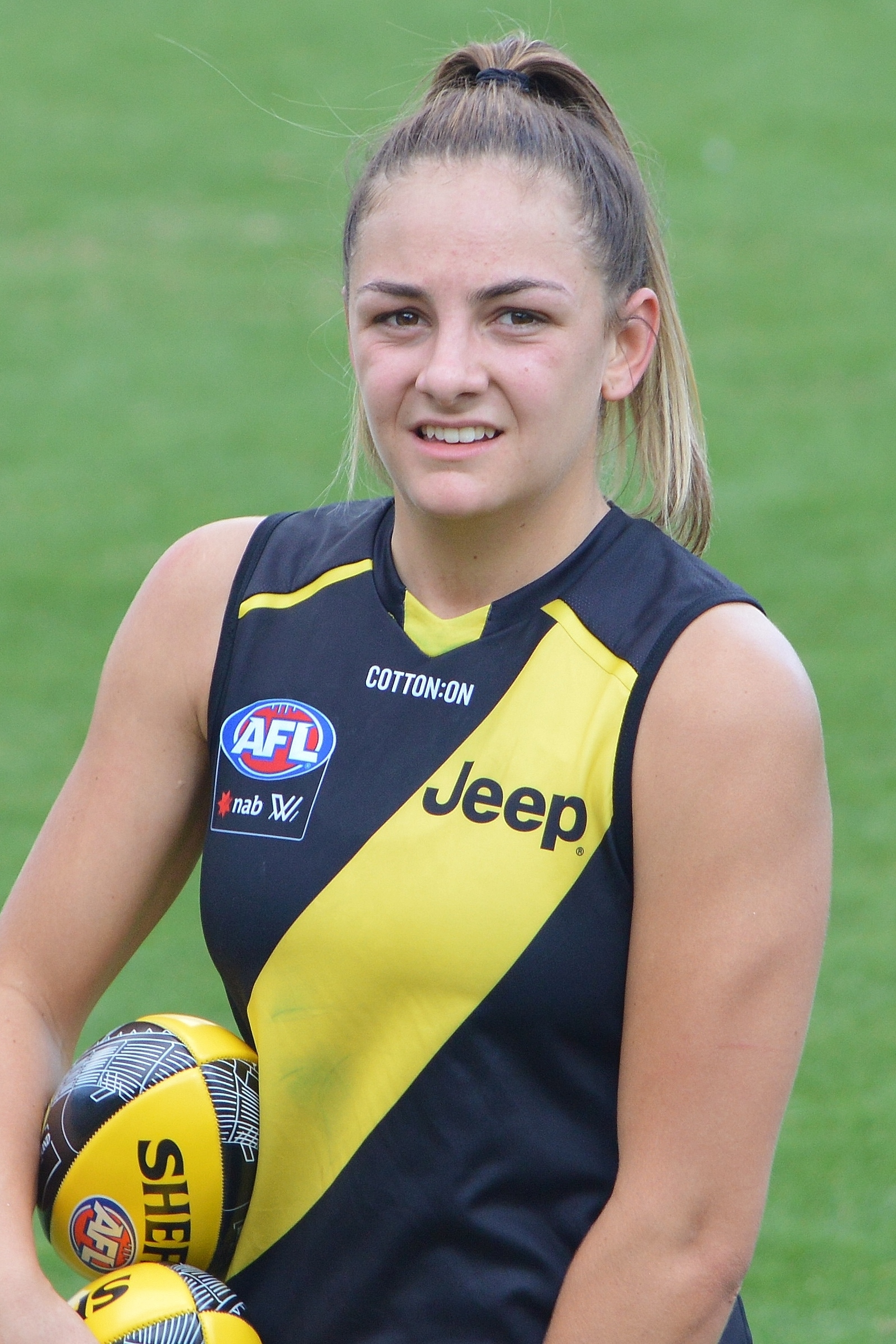
Richmond's Monique Conti, league best and fairest winner

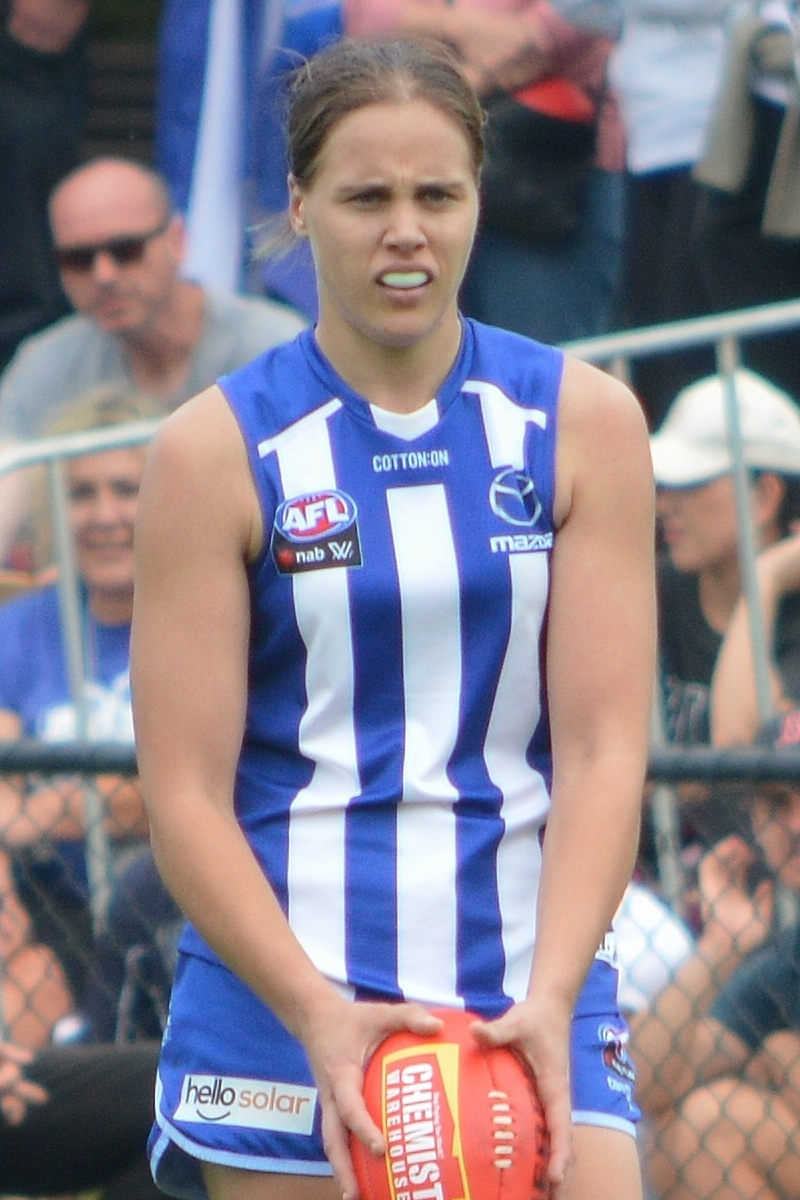
North Melbourne's Jasmine Garner, AFLPA most valuable player and AFLCA champion player of the year

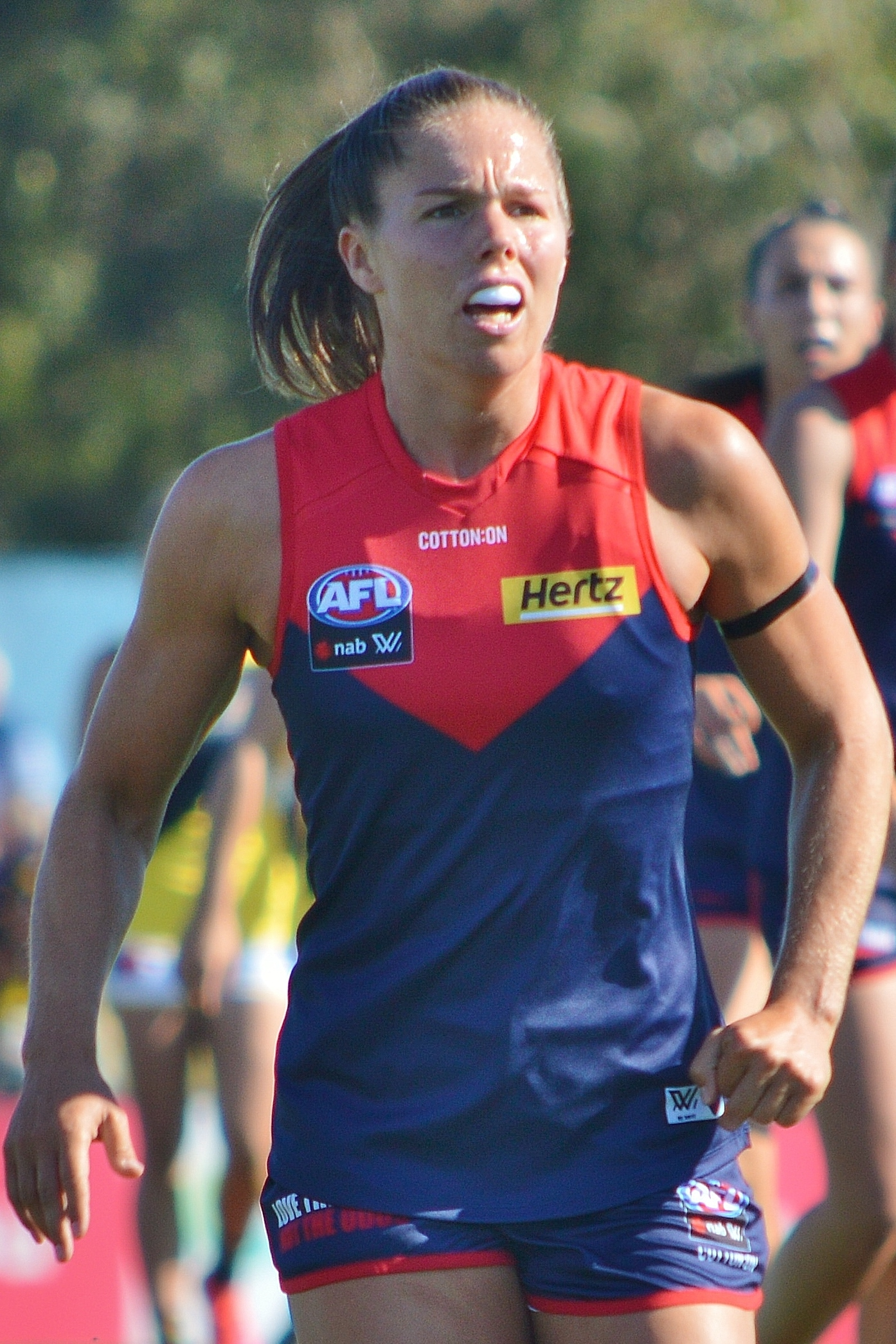
Melbourne captain Kate Hore, AFLPA best captain, All-Australian captain and equal leading goalkicker

=== Major awards ===
- The AFL Women's best and fairest was awarded to Richmond's Monique Conti.
- The AFLPA AFLW most valuable player was awarded to North Melbourne's Jasmine Garner; Melbourne captain Kate Hore was voted as best captain, Brisbane's Courtney Hodder was voted as most courageous player, and Geelong's Aishling Moloney was voted as best first-year player.
- The AFLCA AFLW champion player of the year was awarded to North Melbourne's Jasmine Garner; Brisbane coach Craig Starcevich and Sydney coach Scott Gowans tied for coach of the year.
- The AFL Women's Grand Final best-on-ground medal was awarded to Brisbane captain Breanna Koenen.
- The AFL Women's All-Australian team was announced on 27 November; Melbourne captain Kate Hore was named captain and Essendon co-captain Bonnie Toogood was named vice-captain, while North Melbourne captain Emma Kearney was selected for the eighth consecutive season.
- The AFL Women's leading goalkicker was awarded to Melbourne's Kate Hore and Eden Zanker.
- The AFL Women's Rising Star was awarded to Greater Western Sydney's Zarlie Goldsworthy.
- The Goal of the Year was awarded to Richmond's Caitlin Greiser.
- The Mark of the Year was awarded to Brisbane's Courtney Hodder.

=== Leading goalkickers ===
1	Led the goalkicking at the end of the round
1	Led the goalkicking at the end of the home-and-away season
1_{1}	Subscript indicates the player's goal tally to that point of the season
–	Did not play during that round
X	Had a bye during that round

#	Player	Team	Home-and-away season (AFL Women's leading goalkicker)										Finals series				Total	Games	Average
#	Player	Team	1	2	3	4	5	6	7	8	9	10	F1	F2	F3	GF	Total	Games	Average
1	Dakota Davidson	Brisbane	2_{2}	4_{6}	2_{8}	–_{8}	3_{11}	0_{11}	1_{12}	1_{13}	2_{15}	2_{17}	2_{19}	X_{19}	2_{21}	2_{23}	23	12	1.92
1	Eden Zanker	Melbourne	2_{2}	1_{3}	2_{5}	3_{8}	2_{10}	5_{15}	2_{17}	1_{18}	2_{20}	0_{20}	0_{20}	3_{23}			23	12	1.92
3	Tahlia Randall	North Melbourne	2_{2}	4_{6}	1_{7}	0_{7}	0_{7}	5_{12}	2_{14}	0_{14}	1_{15}	1_{16}	3_{19}	X_{19}	2_{21}	0_{21}	21	13	1.62
4	Kate Hore	Melbourne	1_{1}	5_{6}	2_{8}	2_{10}	4_{14}	0_{14}	2_{16}	1_{17}	2_{19}	1_{20}	0_{20}	0_{20}			20	12	1.67
4	Danielle Ponter	Adelaide	0_{0}	1_{1}	3_{4}	2_{6}	2_{8}	2_{10}	1_{11}	3_{14}	1_{15}	1_{16}	0_{16}	1_{17}	3_{20}		20	13	1.54
4	Chloe Scheer	Geelong	1_{1}	5_{6}	0_{6}	4_{10}	0_{10}	2_{12}	2_{14}	0_{14}	1_{15}	3_{18}	1_{19}	–_{19}	1_{20}		20	12	1.67
7	Caitlin Gould	Adelaide	1_{1}	3_{4}	2_{6}	1_{7}	2_{9}	1_{10}	3_{13}	1_{14}	2_{16}	2_{18}	0_{18}	1_{19}	0_{19}		19	13	1.46
8	Eloise Jones	Adelaide	1_{1}	1_{2}	0_{2}	4_{6}	2_{8}	1_{9}	1_{10}	2_{12}	1_{13}	0_{13}	4_{17}	1_{18}	0_{18}		18	13	1.38
8	Chloe Molloy	Sydney	2_{2}	1_{3}	0_{3}	2_{5}	0_{5}	1_{6}	0_{6}	3_{9}	3_{12}	2_{14}	3_{17}	1_{18}			18	12	1.50
10	Gemma Houghton	Port Adelaide	1_{1}	1_{2}	0_{2}	3_{5}	2_{7}	1_{8}	1_{9}	2_{11}	2_{13}	3_{16}					16	10	1.60
10	Jackie Parry	Geelong	3_{3}	3_{6}	0_{6}	2_{8}	0_{8}	0_{8}	1_{9}	1_{10}	1_{11}	1_{12}	1_{13}	1_{14}	2_{16}		16	13	1.23
10	Jamie Stanton	Gold Coast	1_{1}	6_{7}	3_{10}	2_{12}	0_{12}	1_{13}	0_{13}	1_{14}	1_{15}	1_{16}	0_{16}				16	11	1.45
10	Bonnie Toogood	Essendon	2_{2}	1_{3}	2_{5}	2_{7}	3_{10}	1_{11}	1_{12}	1_{13}	2_{15}	0_{15}	1_{16}				16	11	1.45
Other end-of-round leaders
	Alyssa Bannan	Melbourne	3_{3}	3_{6}	0_{6}	1_{7}	0_{7}	0_{7}	5_{12}	0_{12}	0_{12}	0_{12}	1_{13}	0_{13}			13	12	1.08
	Darcy Vescio	Carlton	3_{3}	0_{3}	2_{5}	0_{5}	0_{5}	1_{6}	0_{6}	1_{7}	0_{7}	0_{7}					7	10	0.70

Source: Australian Football

=== Club best and fairest ===
Player(s)	Club	Award	Ref.
Ebony Marinoff	Adelaide	Club Champion	
Ally Anderson	Brisbane	Best and fairest	
Breann Moody	Carlton	Best and fairest	
Brittany Bonnici	Collingwood	Best and fairest	
Bonnie Toogood	Essendon	Best and fairest	
Angelique Stannett	Fremantle	Fairest and best	
Georgie Prespakis	Geelong	Best and fairest	
Claudia Whitfort	Gold Coast	Club Champion	
Zarlie Goldsworthy	Greater Western Sydney	Gabrielle Trainor Medal	
Emily Bates	Hawthorn	Best and fairest	
Tyla Hanks, Kate Hore	Melbourne	Daisy Pearce Trophy	
Jasmine Garner	North Melbourne	Best and fairest	
Abbey Dowrick	Port Adelaide	Best and fairest	
Monique Conti	Richmond	Best and fairest	
Jaimee Lambert	St Kilda	Best and fairest	
Laura Gardiner	Sydney	Club Champion	
Charlie Thomas	West Coast	Club Champion	
Ellie Blackburn	Western Bulldogs	Best and fairest	

== Player movement and draft ==
The player movement period ran from November 2023 to March 2024. Among the mechanisms used were an expansion under-18 talent pathway pre-signing period, allowing the four newest teams (Essendon, Hawthorn, Port Adelaide and Sydney) to sign players from their women's academies, (Note: Upon their entry into the competition, the four clubs were each given the option of signing three academy players over a two-year period, however this was extended to three years given the supplementary draft held earlier in the year was for overage players only.) and the supplemental selection period, during which clubs could recruit players who nominated for and were overlooked in the national draft, which was held on 18 December 2023.

== See also ==
- 2023 AFL season

== Sources ==
- 2023 AFL Women's season at afl.com.au
- 2023 AFL Women's season at Australian Football
- 2023 AFL Women's season at Austadiums
