= Charlotte Thomas =

Charlotte Thomas may refer to:

- Charlie Thomas (Australian footballer) (born 2003), Australian footballer
- Charlotte Thomas (golfer) (born 1993), English professional golfer
