= West Coast Club Champion (AFL Women's) =

- Description: The best and fairest player of the West Coast Eagles in the AFL Women's
- Country: Australia
- Presented by: West Coast Eagles
- First award: 2020
- Currently held by: Ella Roberts

In the AFL Women's (AFLW), the West Coast Club Champion award is awarded to the best and fairest player at the West Coast Eagles during the home-and-away season. The award has been awarded annually since the club's inaugural season in the competition in 2020, and Dana Hooker was the inaugural winner of the award.

== Recipients ==
**Bold**	Denotes current player

Season	Recipient(s)	Ref.
2020	Dana Hooker	
2021	Isabella Lewis	
2022 (S6)	Emma Swanson	
2022 (S7)	Emma Swanson	
2023	Charlotte Thomas	
2024	Ella Roberts	
2025	Ella Roberts	

== See also ==
- John Worsfold Medal (list of West Coast Eagles best and fairest winners in the Australian Football League)
