= Shelley Scott =

Australian rules footballer

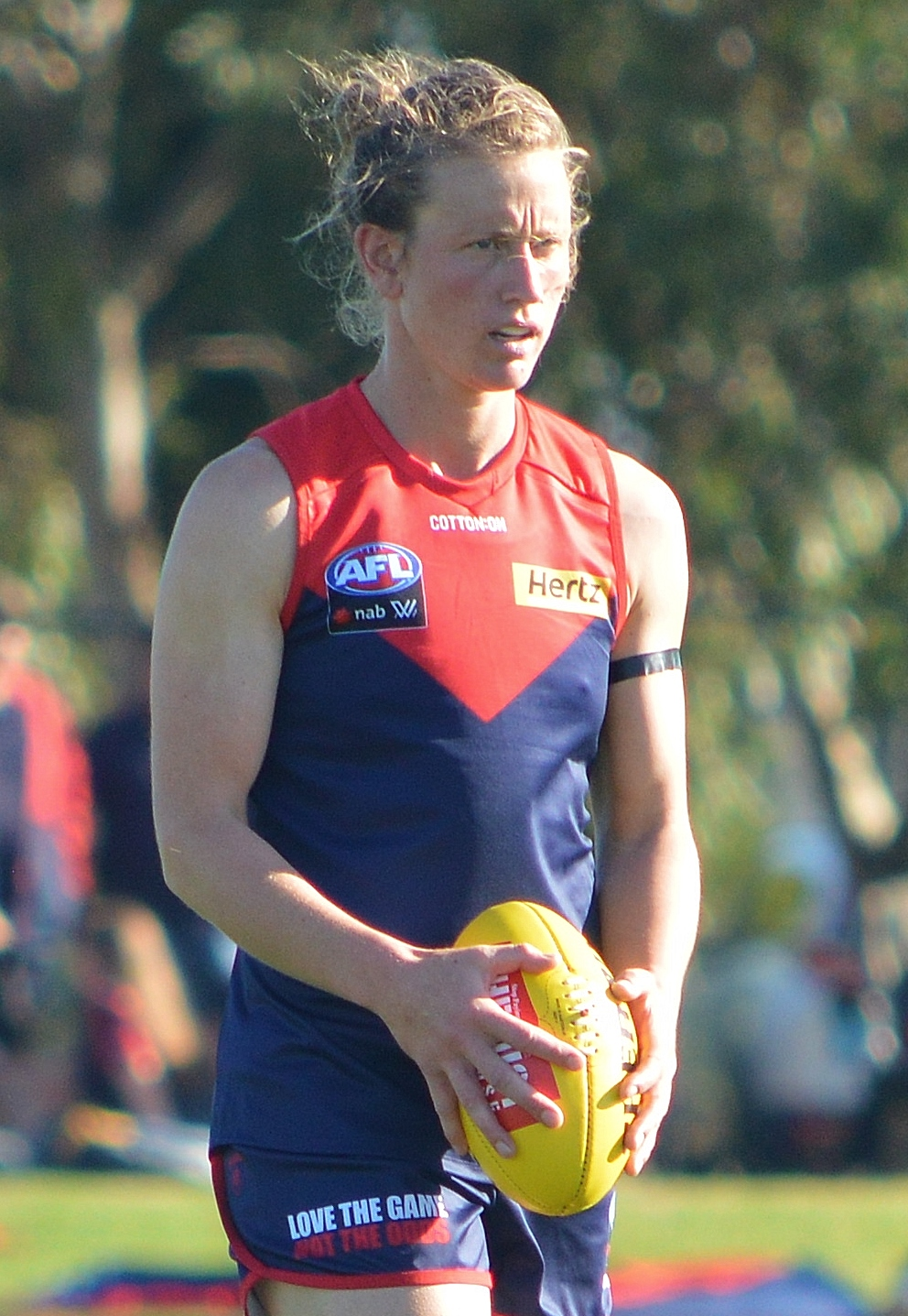
- Scott with Melbourne in February 2021

Personal information
- Born: 16 March 1988 (age 38)
- Original team: VU Western Spurs (VFL Women's)
- Draft: No. 41, 2016 AFL Women's draft
- Debut: Round 1, 2017, Melbourne vs. Brisbane, at Casey Fields
- Height: 170 cm (5 ft 7 in)
- Position: Utility

Playing career^{1}
Years	Club	Games (Goals)
2017–2022 (S6)	Melbourne	49 (26)
2022 (S7)–2025	Geelong	28 (21)
Total		77 (47)
- ^{1} Playing statistics correct to the end of the 2025 season.

Career highlights
- Melbourne co-captain: 2019

Shelley Scott (born 16 March 1988) is a former Australian rules footballer who played for Melbourne and Geelong in the AFL Women's.

Scott was drafted by Melbourne with their sixth selection and forty-first overall in the 2016 AFL Women's draft. She made her debut in the fifteen point loss to Brisbane at Casey Fields in the opening round of the 2017 season. She missed one match during the season, the round five match against Greater Western Sydney due to a shoulder injury.

Melbourne signed Scott for the 2018 season during the trade period in May 2017.

In December 2018, Scott and Elise O'Dea were announced as Melbourne co-captains, while previous captain Daisy Pearce took maternity leave.

In June 2022, Scott was traded alongside Jacqueline Parry to Geelong in exchange for Jordan Ivey and pick 51.

After 28 games for Geelong, Scott retired at the end of the 2025 season.

== Statistics ==
Legend
G	Goals	K	Kicks	D	Disposals	T	Tackles
B	Behinds	H	Handballs	M	Marks

Season	Team	No.	Games	Totals							Averages (per game)							Votes
Season	Team	No.	Games	G	B	K	H	D	M	T	G	B	K	H	D	M	T	Votes
2017	Melbourne	12	6	5	2	41	24	65	24	13	0.8	0.3	6.8	4.0	10.8	2.7	2.2	0
2018	Melbourne	12	7	3	4	46	33	79	21	32	0.4	0.6	6.6	4.7	11.3	3.0	4.6	0
2019	Melbourne	12	7	1	2	33	27	60	23	19	0.1	0.3	4.7	3.9	8.6	3.3	2.7	0
2020	Melbourne	12	7	5	3	52	26	78	28	26	0.7	0.7	7.4	3.7	11.1	4.0	3.7	3
2021	Melbourne	12	11	10	10	84	47	131	32	40	0.9	0.9	7.6	4.3	11.9	2.9	3.6	2
2022 (S6)	Melbourne	12	11	2	2	32	38	70	22	16	0.2	0.2	2.9	3.5	6.4	2.0	1.5	0
2022 (S7)	Geelong	15	11	9	6	51	46	97	29	27	0.8	0.5	4.6	4.2	8.8	2.6	2.5	2
2023	Geelong	15	7	3	3	30	19	49	17	21	0.4	0.4	4.3	2.7	7.0	2.4	3.0	0
2024	Geelong	15	10	9	4	47	23	70	22	15	0.9	0.4	4.7	2.3	7.0	2.2	1.5	0
2025	Geelong	15	0	—	—	—	—	—	—	—	—	—	—	—	—	—	—	0
Career			77	47	38	416	283	699	210	209	0.6	0.5	5.4	3.7	9.1	2.7	2.7	7
