= Jaxon Prior =

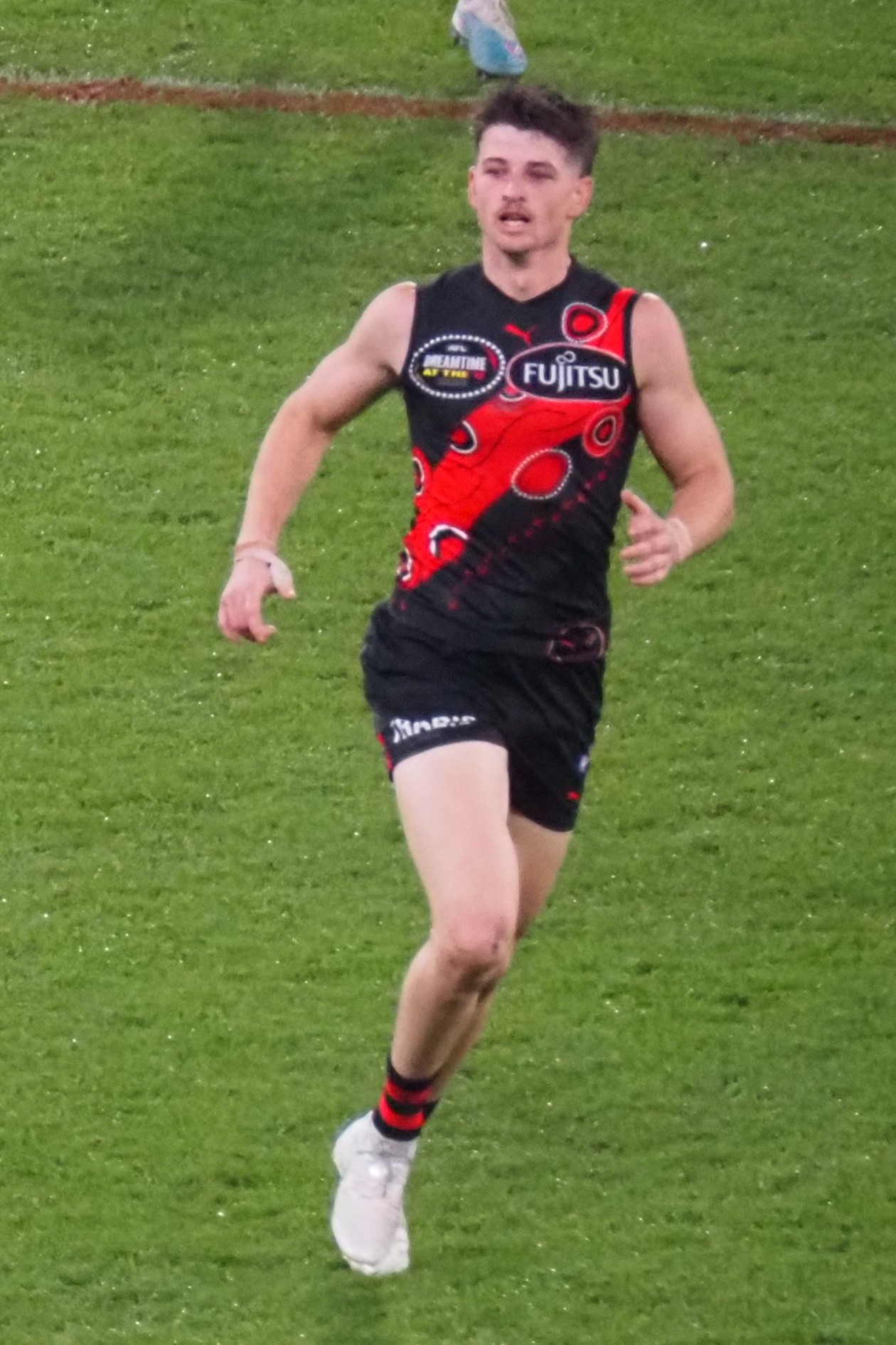
- Prior playing for Essendon in 2025

Personal information
- Born: 4 June 2001 (age 25)
- Original teams: West Perth (WAFL); Sorrento-Duncraig JFC
- Draft: No. 59, 2019 national draft
- Debut: Round 2, 2021, Brisbane Lions vs. Geelong, at Kardinia Park
- Height: 188 cm (6 ft 2 in)
- Weight: 79 kg (174 lb)
- Position: Defender

Club information
- Current club: Essendon
- Number: 25

Playing career^{1}
Years	Club	Games (Goals)
2020–2024	Brisbane Lions	39 (11)
2025–	Essendon	43 (0)
Total		80 (11)
- ^{1} Playing statistics correct to the end of round 22, 2026.

Jaxon Prior (born 4 June 2001) is a professional Australian rules footballer who currently plays for the Essendon Football Club in the Australian Football League (AFL), having previously played for the Brisbane Lions.

== AFL career ==
Prior, a half back, is the son of former Essendon and West Coast footballer Michael Prior. He played his junior football with Sorrento-Duncraig and was recruited out of West Perth, having been named in the 2019 WAFL Colts team of the year.

=== Brisbane Lions ===
Prior was selected by the Brisbane Lions with the 59th pick of the 2019 national draft. Prior made 18 appearances in his debut season in 2021. His 12 games in 2022 included the Lions' two-point elimination final win over Richmond. He was re-signed at the end of the 2022 season for another two years.

Prior was delisted by the Lions at the end of the 2024 AFL season

=== Essendon ===
Following his delisting from Brisbane, Prior was picked up by Essendon on the first day of the Supplemental Selection Period for the 2025 season. This linked him up with the club in which his father, Michael, played 81 matches for between 1994 and 2000.

Prior made his club debut for the Bombers in round 1 against Hawthorn at the Melbourne Cricket Ground. Prior was one of only four Essendon players to play every game for the season.

== Statistics ==
Updated to the end of round 22, 2026.

Legend
G	Goals	K	Kicks	D	Disposals	T	Tackles
B	Behinds	H	Handballs	M	Marks

Season	Team	No.	Games	Totals							Averages (per game)							Votes
Season	Team	No.	Games	G	B	K	H	D	M	T	G	B	K	H	D	M	T	Votes
2020 (Note: The 2020 season was played with 17 home-and-away matches per team (down from 22) and 16-minute quarters with time on (down from 20-minute quarters with time on) due to the impact of the COVID-19 pandemic.)	Brisbane Lions	45	0	—	—	—	—	—	—	—	—	—	—	—	—	—	—	0
2021	Brisbane Lions	20	18	6	4	116	44	160	45	24	0.3	0.2	6.4	2.4	8.9	2.5	1.3	0
2022	Brisbane Lions	20	12	4	3	104	34	138	38	23	0.3	0.3	8.7	2.8	11.5	3.2	1.9	0
2023	Brisbane Lions	20	5	1	1	36	7	43	14	11	0.2	0.2	7.2	1.4	8.6	2.8	2.2	0
2024	Brisbane Lions	20	4	0	0	30	7	37	18	5	0.0	0.0	7.5	1.8	9.3	4.5	1.3	0
2025	Essendon	25	23	0	1	254	108	362	113	35	0.0	0.0	11.0	4.7	15.7	4.9	1.5	0
2026	Essendon	25	20	0	4	237	91	328	91	37	0.0	0.2	11.9	4.6	16.4	4.6	1.9	0
Career			82	11	13	777	291	1068	319	135	0.1	0.2	9.5	3.5	13.0	3.9	1.6	0
