= List of West Coast Eagles captains =

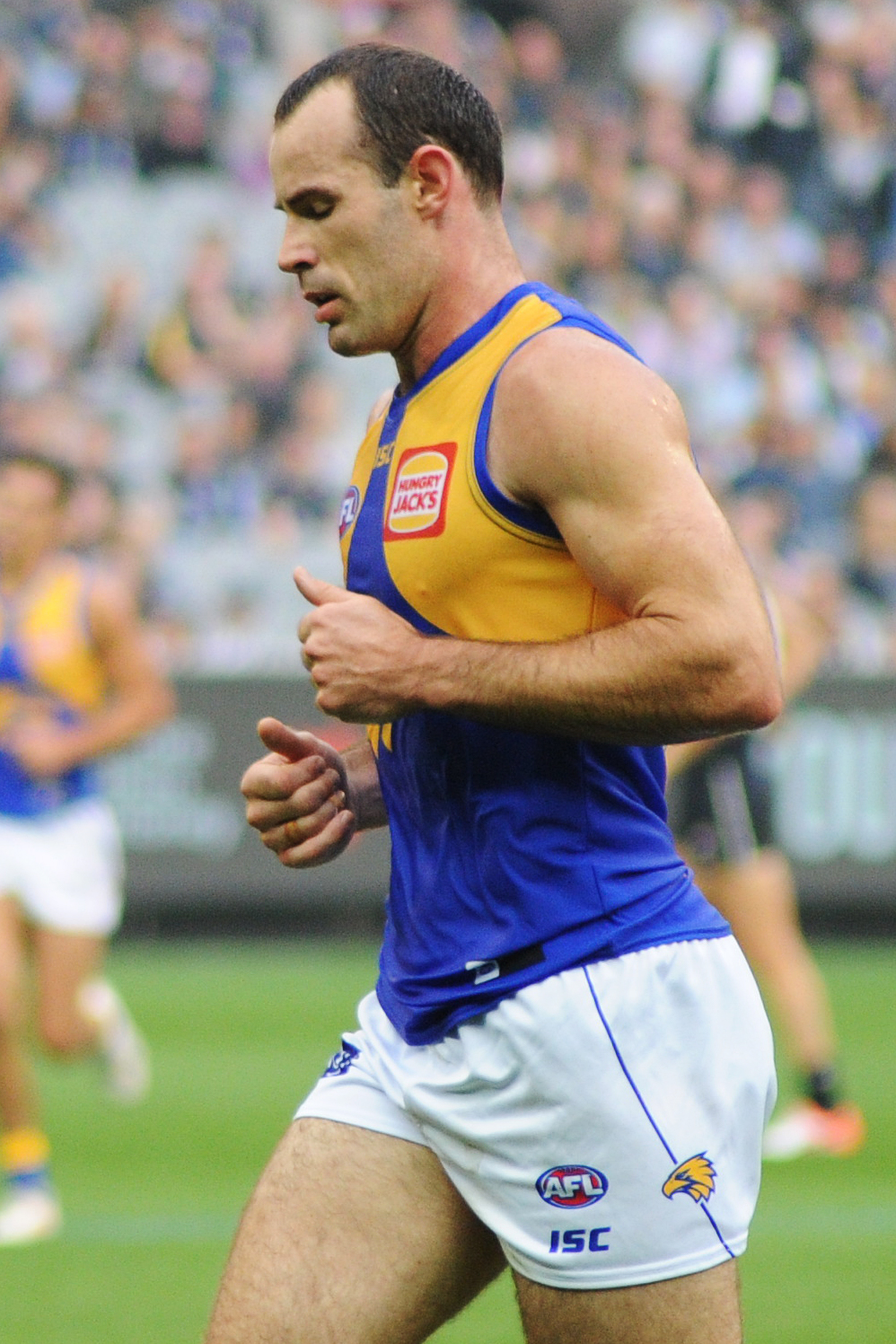
Shannon Hurn was West Coast's captain from 2014 to 2019

The West Coast Eagles are a football club in the Australian Football League and AFL Women's. The club is based in Western Australia and has won the AFL premiership four times, in 1992, 1994, 2006 and 2018.

== VFL/AFL ==
There have been thirteen players to hold the men's captaincy since the club commenced competition in 1987:^{[note1]}

| Captain | Period of captaincy | Games as Captain |
|---|---|---|
| Ross Glendinning | 1987–1988 | 40 |
| Murray Rance | 1989 | 17 |
| Steve Malaxos | 1990 | 22 |
| John Worsfold | 1991–1998 | 138 |
| Guy McKenna | 1998–2000 | 31 |
| Dean Kemp | 2001^{[note2]} | 8 |
| Ben Cousins | 2001–2005^{[note2]} | 109 |
| Chris Judd | 2006–2007 | 42 |
| Darren Glass | 2008–2014 | 129 |
| Shannon Hurn | 2014–2019^{[note3]} | 123 |
| Luke Shuey | 2020–2023 | 56 |
| Oscar Allen | 2024–2025^{[note4]} | 23 |
| Liam Duggan | 2024–^{[note4]} ^{[note5]} | 42 |
| Liam Baker | 2026–^{[note5]} | 0 |

== AFL Women's ==
The club entered the AFL Women's competition in 2020.

| Captain | Period of captaincy | Games as Captain |
|---|---|---|
| Emma Swanson | 2020–2024 | 52 |
| Bella Lewis & Charlie Thomas | 2025– | 5 |
