= Michael Prior (footballer) =

Australian rules footballer (born 1973)

Personal information
- Full name: Michael Prior
- Born: 6 September 1973 (age 53)
- Original team: East Perth (WAFL)
- Debut: Round 20, 5 August 1994, Essendon vs. Collingwood, at MCG
- Height: 182 cm (6 ft 0 in)
- Weight: 79 kg (174 lb)

Playing career^{1}
Years	Club	Games (Goals)
1994–2000	Essendon	81 (19)
2001–2002	West Coast	9 (1)
Total		90 (20)

Coaching career^{3}
Years	Club	Games (W–L–D)
2022 (S6)–2023	West Coast (W)	28 (5–23–0)
- ^{1} Playing statistics correct to the end of 2002.^{3} Coaching statistics correct as of round 8, 2023.

Career highlights
- WAFL premiership player: 2002

Michael Prior (born 6 September 1973) is a former Australian rules footballer who played for the Essendon Football Club and the West Coast Eagles in the Australian Football League (AFL). He is the former senior coach of West Coast in the AFL Women's (AFLW) competition.

Drafted third overall in the 1992 AFL draft, he made the unusual choice at the time to remain with his original club, East Perth, for the 1993 AFL season, Essendon's famous 'Baby Bombers' premiership-winning year, as he felt that playing regular league football in the WAFL would be better for his development. Essendon coach Kevin Sheedy disagreed with this theory but allowed him to do so.

He played 81 games for the Bombers between 1994 and 2000. After the 2000 season, he was dropped by the Bombers and then picked up by West Coast. He spent two seasons with the Eagles and played just nine games for them due to a devastating knee injury suffered in round 7, 2001; he recovered and continued his tally of games with East Perth in the WAFL when not required and was a member of their 2002 premiership side.

After retiring from the AFL, he continued to play with East Perth until the end of the 2003 season. In total he played 69 games for the Royals.

He was colorfully referred to by 3AW commentator Rex Hunt as "prior conviction".

His son Jaxon has played for the Brisbane Lions since 2020 but was delisted in 2024 and signed by Essendon for 2025.

Prior coached the West Coast Eagles in the AFL Women’s competition from season six (2022) until season eight (2023).

On 25 October 2023, Prior announced his departure from the Eagles after round 8 of the 2023 season (season 8). He was later replaced by Daisy Pearce as senior coach.
