= Stephen Symonds =

Australian rules football coach

Coaching career^{3}
Years	Club	Games (W–L–D)
2017–2019	Norwood (W)	31 (20–11–0)
2020–2023	Collingwood (W)	51 (31–20–0)
Total		82 (51–31–0)
- ^{3} Coaching statistics correct as of the 2023 season.

Career highlights
- SANFL Women's premiership coach: 2017; SANFL Women's coach of the year: 2017

Stephen Symonds is an Australian rules football coach who is the former head coach of the Collingwood Football Club in the AFL Women's competition (AFLW).

== Coaching career ==
=== Norwood ===
Symonds was recruited by Norwood in October 2016 to establish its inaugural women’s program. He oversaw one of the leading female football programs in South Australia, leading the team to two grand finals and a premiership in 2017. He received South Australia’s Team Coach of the Year award in 2017.

=== AFL Women's ===
Symonds was appointed coach by Collingwood in the AFLW in June 2019. Symonds was chosen from a strong field of candidates that was believed to include former Adelaide AFLW coach Bec Goddard and former Richmond AFL coach Danny Frawley.

Symonds coached the team for 51 games over 5 seasons, and mutually parted ways with the club in November 2023.

== Coaching statistics ==
Statistics are correct to the end of the 2023 season

Legend
W	Wins	L	Losses	D	Draws	W%	Winning percentage	LP	Ladder position	LT	League teams

Season	Team	Games	W	L	D	W %	LP	LT
2020	Collingwood	7	4	3	0	57.14%	4th (conf. B)	14 (7 per conf.)
2021	Collingwood	11	8	3	0	72.73%	3rd	14
2022 (S6)	Collingwood	11	6	5	0	54.55%	6th	14
2022 (S7)	Collingwood	12	8	4	0	66.67%	6th	18
2023	Collingwood	10	5	5	0	50.00%	11th	18
Career totals		51	31	20	0	60.78%		
