= Bella Lewis =

Australian rules footballer

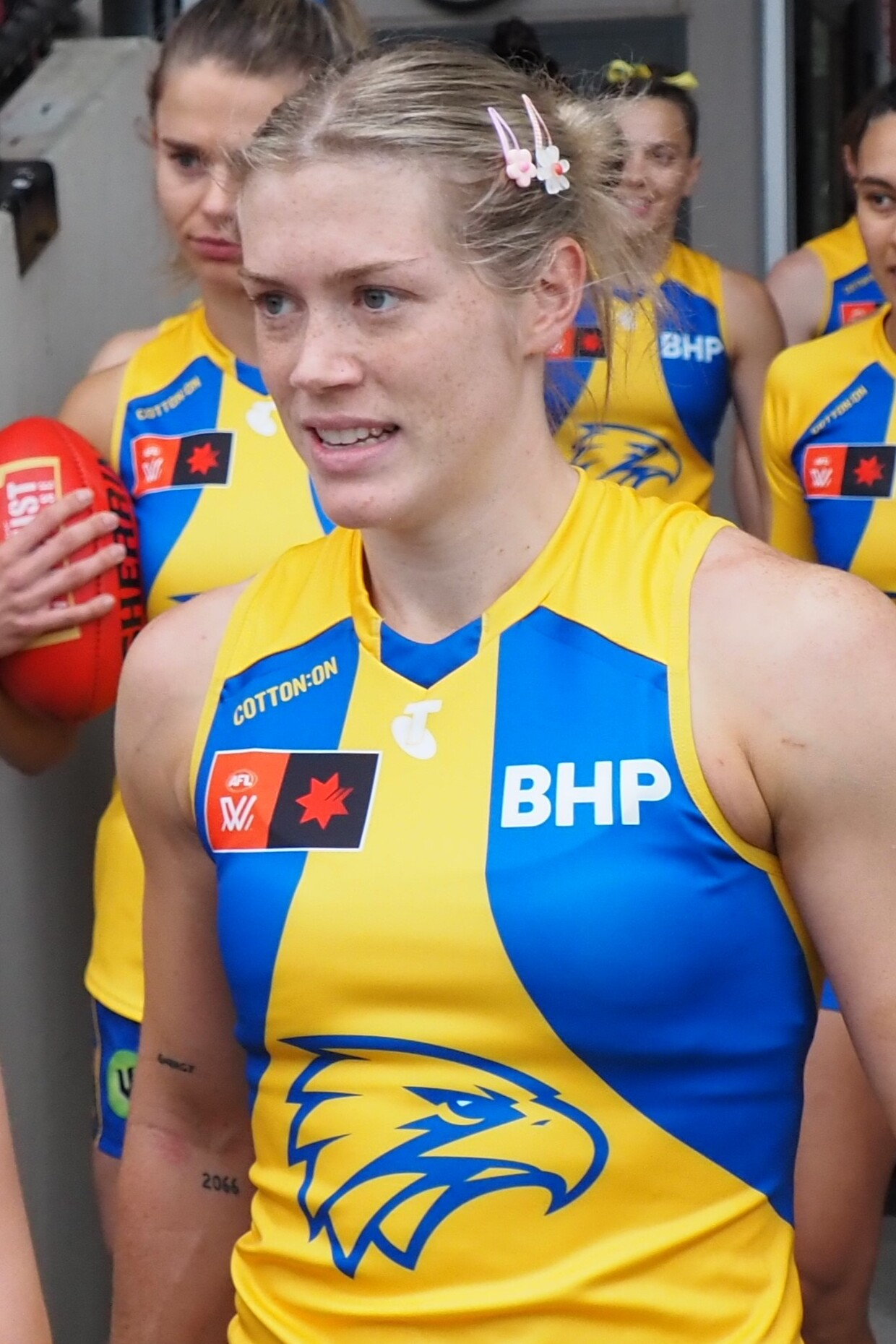
- Lewis pre-match with West Coast in 2025

Personal information
- Full name: Isabella Judith Lewis
- Born: 16 November 2002 (age 23)
- Original team: Claremont Football Club (WAFL Women's)
- Draft: No. 3, 2020 national draft
- Debut: Round 1, 2021, West Coast vs. Adelaide, at Lathlain Park
- Height: 165 cm (5 ft 5 in)
- Position: Midfielder

Club information
- Current club: West Coast
- Number: 6

Playing career^{1}
Years	Club	Games (Goals)
2021–	West Coast	70 (18)
- ^{1} Playing statistics correct to the end of the 2026 season.

Career highlights
- West Coast Club Champion: 2021; West Coast co-captain: 2025–

Isabella Judith Lewis (born Isabella Judith Waltho Lewis, 16 November 2002) is an Australian rules footballer and the co-captain of the West Coast Eagles in the AFL Women's (AFLW). She was drafted with the third selection in the 2020 AFL Women's draft by the West Coast.

== Early life ==
Lewis did professional Trampolining at national level for Australia until 2018. She played for Claremont Football Club in the WAFL Women's. She represented Western Australia at the 2019 AFL Women's Under 18 Championships, where she played 3 games and kicked 1 goal, and averaged 12 disposals.

== AFLW career ==
Lewis debuted for West Coast in the opening round of the 2021 AFL Women's season, where they had a 38 point defeat to Adelaide. On debut, she collected 11 disposals, 1 behind, 2 marks and 3 tackles. Lewis had an outstanding first season, and won the club's best first year player and best and fairest awards. It was revealed Lewis had signed on with West Coast for two more years on 22 June 2021.

Lewis is in a relationship with fellow AFLW player Isabella Grant.

Lewis was appointed co-captain of West Coast ahead of the 2025 AFL Women's season, alongside Charlotte Thomas.

== Statistics ==
Statistics are correct to the end of round 3, 2021.

Legend
G	Goals	K	Kicks	D	Disposals	T	Tackles
B	Behinds	H	Handballs	M	Marks

Season	Team	No.	Games	Totals							Averages (per game)							Votes
Season	Team	No.	Games	G	B	K	H	D	M	T	G	B	K	H	D	M	T	Votes
2021	West Coast	6	3	0	1	18	14	32	3	9	0.0	0.3	6.0	4.7	10.7	1.0	3.0	
Career			3	0	1	18	14	32	3	9	0.0	0.3	6.0	4.7	10.7	1.0	3.0	0

== Honours and achievements ==
Individual

- AFL Women's Rising Star nominee: 2021
