= Laura Pugh =

Australian rules footballer

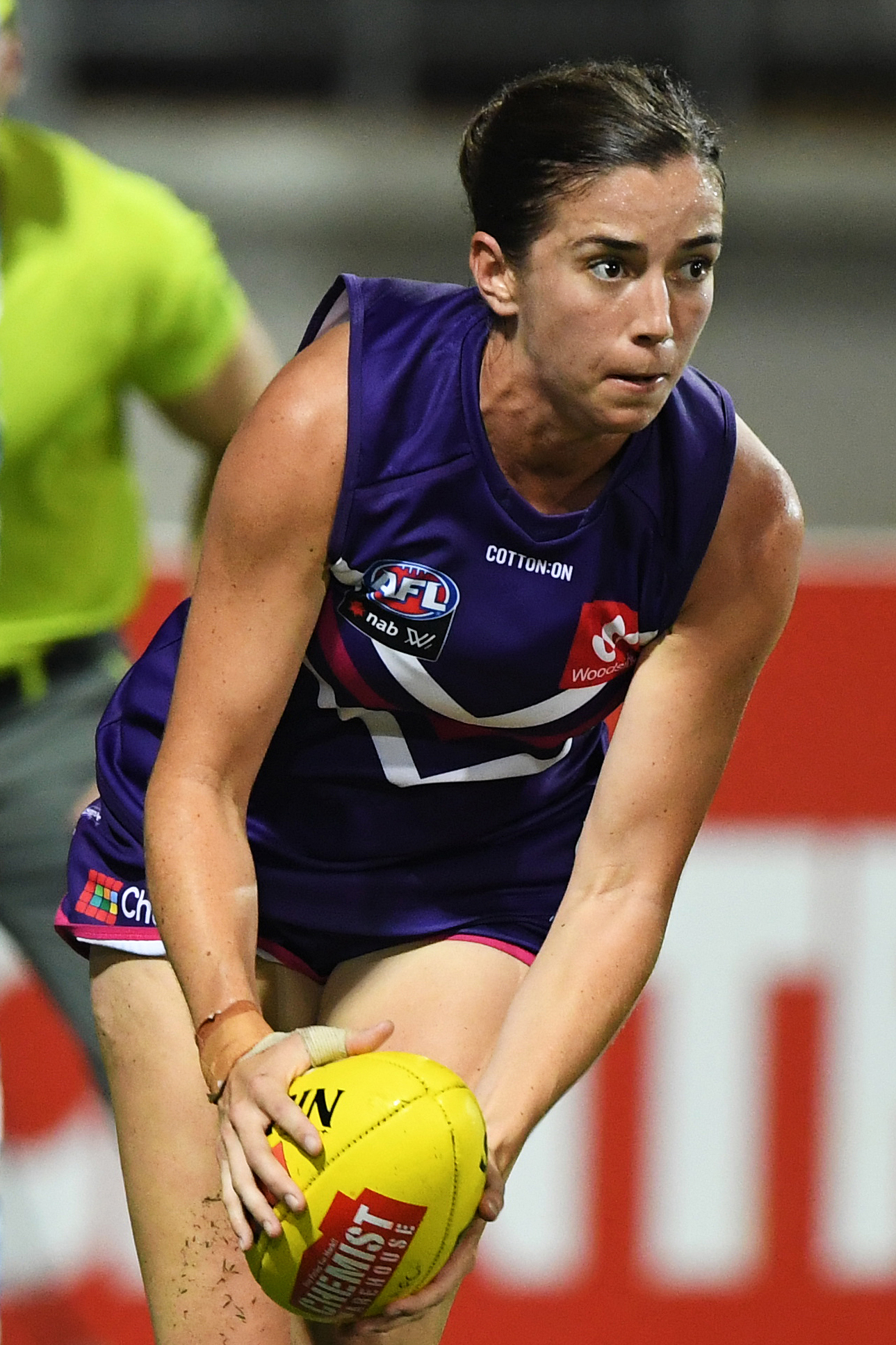
- Pugh playing for Fremantle in January 2019

Personal information
- Born: 1 November 1993 (age 33)
- Original team: West Perth (WAWFL)
- Draft: No. 59, 2018 AFL Women's draft
- Debut: Round 1, 2019, Fremantle vs. Melbourne, at Casey Fields
- Height: 174 cm (5 ft 9 in)
- Position: Utility

Club information
- Current club: Fremantle
- Number: 32

Playing career^{1}
Years	Club	Games (Goals)
2019–	Fremantle	80 (3)
- ^{1} Playing statistics correct to the end of the 2026 season.

Laura Pugh (born 1 November 1993) is an Australian rules footballer playing for the Fremantle Football Club in the AFL Women's (AFLW). Pugh was drafted by Fremantle with their sixth selection and fifty-ninth overall in the 2018 AFL Women's draft. She made her debut in the four point win against Melbourne at Casey Fields in the opening round of the 2019 season.
