= Jackie Parry =

Australian rules footballer

Personal information
- Full name: Jacqueline Parry
- Born: 12 July 1996 (age 30); Melbourne
- Original team: Canberra (AFL Canberra)
- Draft: No. 54, 2019 national draft
- Debut: Round 4, 2020, Melbourne vs. Collingwood, at Marvel Stadium
- Height: 176 cm (5 ft 9 in)
- Position: Forward

Club information
- Current club: Geelong
- Number: 5

Playing career^{1}
Years	Club	Games (Goals)
2020–2022	Melbourne	22 (6)
S7 (2022)–	Geelong	24 (19)
Total		46 (25)
- ^{1} Playing statistics correct to the end of Round 3, 2026.

Jacqueline Parry (born 12 July 1996) is an Australian rules footballer who plays for Geelong in the AFL Women's (AFLW). She has previously played for Melbourne.

== AFLW career ==
Parry previously played Auskick with Prahan as a child until she reached the age where she was not permitted to play with the boys.

Parry then took up Football, playing in the NPL in Melbourne before moving to Canberra to study finance at the Australian National University. It is in Canberra where she picked Football back up, playing with the ANU Griffins in the second division AFL Canberra league.

She was then picked up by the Queanbeyan Tigers in the AFL Canberra Women's First Grade division where she was the league's leading goal scorer with 53 goals. In the Grand Final of that year, Parry kicked 5 goals to seal the premiership for Queanbeyan against the Belconnen Magpies.

In October 2019, Parry was drafted by Melbourne from the Queanbeyan Tigers Football Club. Parry played 22 games for the Demons.

In June 2022, Parry was traded alongside Shelley Scott to Geelong in exchange for Jordan Ivey and pick 51.

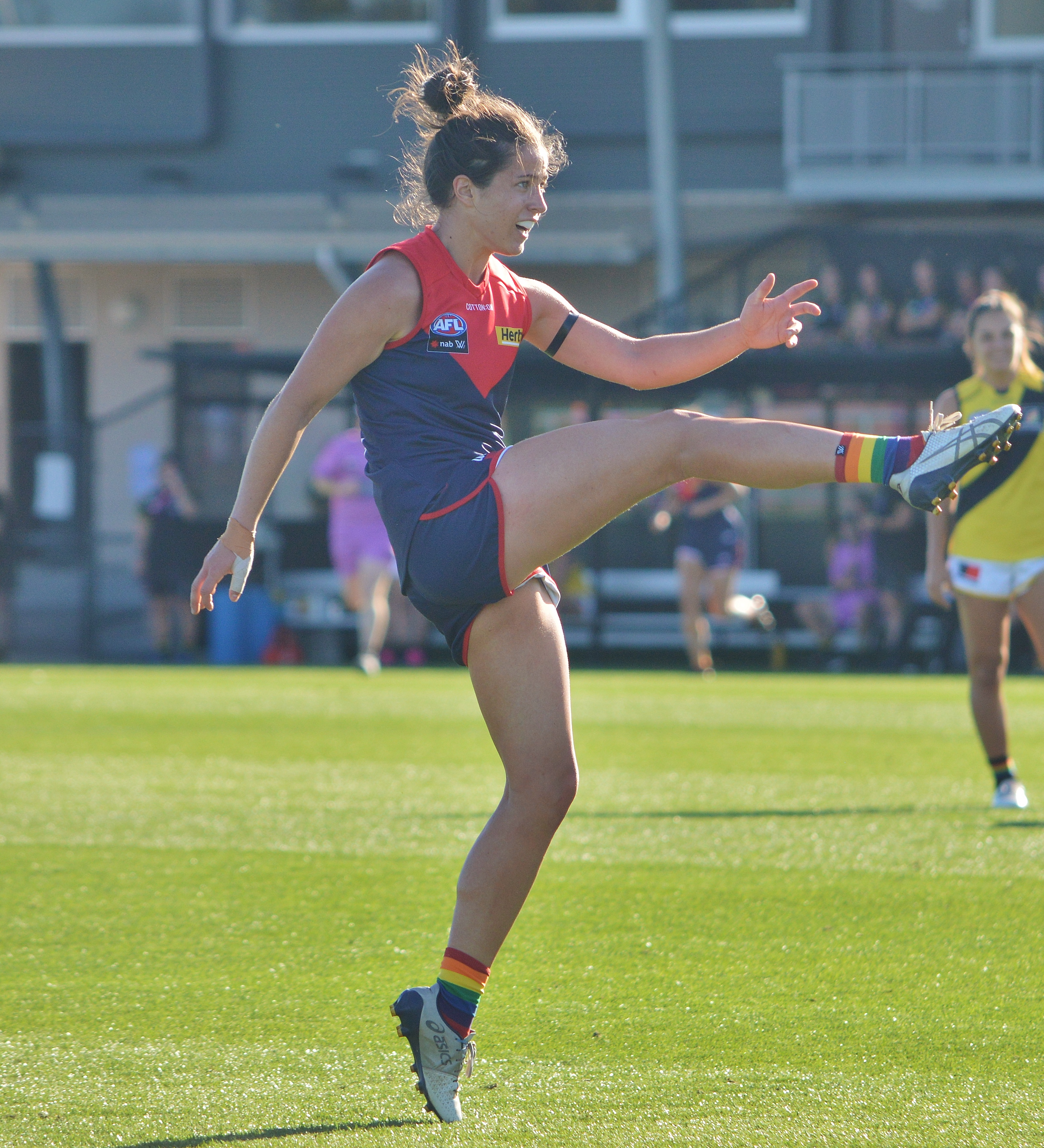
Parry kicks for goal
