= Emma Swanson =

Australian rules footballer

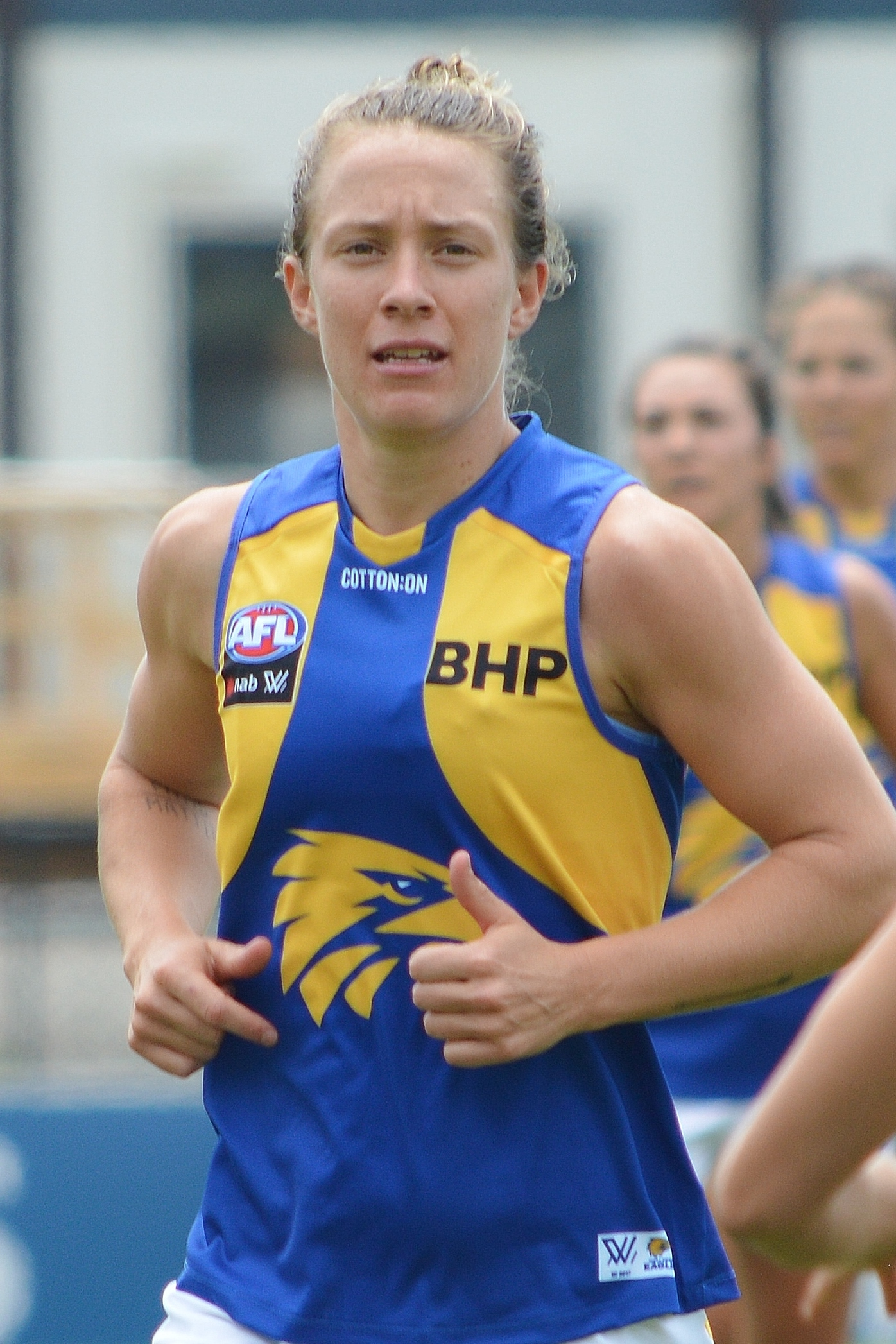
- Swanson with West Coast in January 2020

Personal information
- Born: 27 February 1995 (age 31)
- Original team: East Fremantle (WAWFL)
- Draft: Marquee player 2016: Greater Western Sydney
- Debut: Round 3, 2017, Greater Western Sydney vs. Fremantle, at Blacktown ISP Oval
- Height: 173 cm (5 ft 8 in)
- Position: Midfielder

Club information
- Current club: West Coast
- Number: 13

Playing career^{1}
Years	Club	Games (Goals)
2017–2019	Greater Western Sydney	13 (0)
2020–	West Coast	42 (8)
Total		55 (8)

Representative team honours^{2}
Years	Team	Games (Goals)
2017	The Allies	1 (0)
- ^{1} Playing statistics correct to the end of the 2023 season.^{2} Representative statistics correct as of 2017.

Career highlights
- West Coast captain: 2020–2024

Emma Swanson (born 27 February 1995) is an Australian rules footballer who plays for the West Coast Eagles in the AFL Women's competition.

== Amateur career ==
Swanson is originally from Mandurah, Western Australia. She has played state league football for the Peel Thunderbirds and East Fremantle in the West Australian Women's Football League (WAWFL).

From 2013 to 2015, Swanson represented Melbourne in AFL sanctioned women's exhibition matches. In the 2016 series, she played for the West Coast representative side. She returned to play for Melbourne in the 2016 women's all-star exhibition match.

== AFL Women's career ==
Swanson was signed as a marquee player by Greater Western Sydney in July 2016, ahead of the league's inaugural 2017 season. She injured her hamstring in the week leading up to round one, and consequently did not make her debut until round three. Nonetheless, Swanson was listed in the 2017 All-Australian squad.

Greater Western Sydney signed Swanson for the 2018 season during the trade period in May 2017.

Expansion club West Coast signed Swanson as their inaugural captain ahead of the 2020 AFL Women's season. It was revealed Swanson had signed on with the club for two more years on 28 June 2021, tying her to the Eagles until the end of the 2022/2023 season.

Swanson relinquished captaincy ahead of the 2025 AFL Women's season.

== Statistics ==
Statistics are correct to the end of the 2017 season

Legend
G	Goals	K	Kicks	D	Disposals	T	Tackles
B	Behinds	H	Handballs	M	Marks

Season	Team	No.	Games	Totals							Averages (per game)						
Season	Team	No.	Games	G	B	K	H	D	M	T	G	B	K	H	D	M	T
2017	Greater Western Sydney	17	5	0	1	52	28	80	13	14	0.2	0.0	10.4	5.6	16.0	2.6	2.8
Career			5	0	1	52	28	80	13	14	0.0	0.2	10.4	5.6	16.0	2.6	2.8

== Other work ==
Outside of football, Swanson works as a Firefighter in WA. She completed her training in December 2020 and was recognised as Dux of her graduating class.

Swanson has maintains a hobby farm, extended hospitality decking and lawn.

Emma Swanson was kicked off her own AFLW podcast, the Inside Swoop, by former co-host and teammate Parris Laurie. Laurie welcomed Swanson back to the studio with a peace offering, sharing their biggest episode of the year with AFLW superstar and mother of the year, Dana Hooker.
