= Charlie Thomas (Australian footballer) =

Australian rules football player

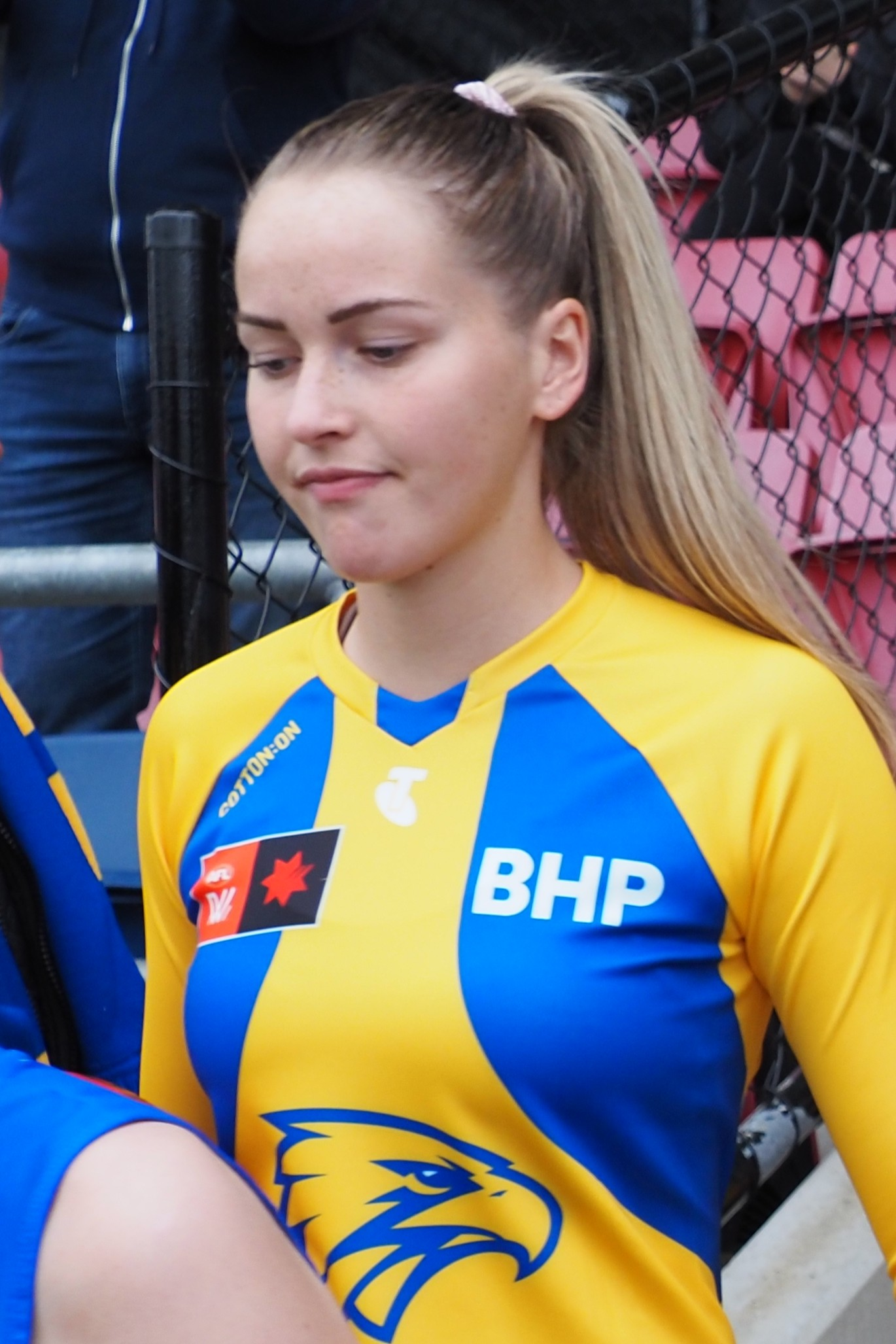
- Thomas pre-match with West Coast in 2025

Personal information
- Full name: Charlotte Thomas
- Born: 5 September 2003 (age 23)
- Original teams: Subiaco, (WAFLW)
- Draft: No. 3, 2021 national draft
- Debut: Round 1, 2022 (S6), West Coast vs. Fremantle, at Fremantle Oval
- Height: 175 cm (5 ft 9 in)
- Position: Tall utility

Club information
- Current club: West Coast
- Number: 3

Playing career^{1}
Years	Club	Games (Goals)
2022 (S6)–	West Coast	54 (2)
- ^{1} Playing statistics correct to the end of 2025.

Career highlights
- West Coast Club Champion: 2023; AFL Women's All-Australian team: 2023; West Coast co-captain: 2025–; 2× 22under22 team: 2024, 2025

Charlotte Thomas (born 5 September 2003) is an Australian rules footballer and the co-captain of the West Coast Eagles in the AFL Women's (AFLW).

== AFL Women's career ==
Thomas played 6 games for Subiaco Football Club in the WAFL Women's in 2020, and 1 game in 2021, being injured for most of that season with a fractured arm.

In the 2021 AFL Women's draft, Thomas was picked by the West Coast Eagles with pick number 3. The guernsey number assigned to her was number 3, which was presented to her at West Coast's 2022 AFLW season launch by Andrew Gaff, who had the number 3 guernsey on the men's team.

Thomas played her first AFLW game on 8 January 2022, against Fremantle in round 1 of 2022 season 6. The role she plays is as a tall utility.

Thomas was appointed co-captain of West Coast ahead of the 2025 AFL Women's season, alongside Bella Lewis. Aged just 21 at the time of appointment, she is the youngest captain in AFLW history.
