= 2024 AFL Women's All-Australian team =

- Date: 25 November 2024
- Venue: Crown Melbourne
- Hosted by: Brihony Dawson; Lauren Wood

Television/radio coverage
- Network: Fox Footy

The 2024 AFL Women's All-Australian team represents the best-performed players of the 2024 AFL Women's season. The team was announced on 25 November 2024 as a complete women's Australian rules football team of 21 players.

== Selection panel ==
The selection panel for the 2024 AFL Women's All-Australian team consists of chairman Andrew Dillon, Gemma Bastiani, Jason Bennett, Sarah Black, Laura Kane, Katie Loynes, Josh Mahoney, Emma Moore, Erin Phillips, Eliza Reilly, Narelle Smith, Kelli Underwood and Megan Waters.

== Initial squad ==
The initial 42-woman All-Australian squad was announced on 12 November 2024; Hawthorn had the most players selected in the initial squad with six, while Collingwood, Greater Western Sydney and the Western Bulldogs were the only clubs to not have any players named. North Melbourne captain Emma Kearney, who had earned selection in all eight teams to that point, missed out on selection for the first time after being injured for most of the season.

**Bold**	Named in the final team

Club	Total	Player(s)
Adelaide	5	**Chelsea Biddell**, **Caitlin Gould**, **Ebony Marinoff**, Danielle Ponter, **Chelsea Randall**
Brisbane	5	**Ally Anderson**, **Sophie Conway**, **Belle Dawes**, Breanna Koenen, **Taylor Smith**
Carlton	1	Harriet Cordner
Collingwood	0	
Essendon	2	**Maddi Gay**, Georgia Nanscawen
Fremantle	3	**Aisling McCarthy**, **Emma O'Driscoll**, **Mim Strom**
Geelong	2	**Aishling Moloney**, Nina Morrison
Gold Coast	1	**Charlie Rowbottom**
Greater Western Sydney	0	
Hawthorn	6	**Aileen Gilroy**, **Tilly Lucas-Rodd**, Aine McDonagh, Jenna Richardson, Lucy Wales, Eliza West
Melbourne	1	Maeve Chaplin
North Melbourne	5	**Jasmine Garner**, **Alice O'Loughlin**, **Ash Riddell**, Kate Shierlaw, Sarah Wright
Port Adelaide	3	Amelie Borg, Shineah Goody, Matilda Scholz
Richmond	2	Monique Conti, Eilish Sheerin
St Kilda	2	Jesse Wardlaw, Serene Watson
Sydney	2	Sofia Hurley, **Brenna Tarrant**
West Coast	2	**Ella Roberts**, Charlie Thomas
Western Bulldogs	0	

== Final team ==
The final team was announced on 25 November 2024. Adelaide and Brisbane had the most selections with four each, with ten teams represented overall. Twelve players achieved selection for the first time, while eight players from the 2022 team were selected. North Melbourne midfielder Jasmine Garner and Adelaide midfielder Ebony Marinoff, who both achieved selection for the seventh time, were named as captain and vice-captain, respectively.

2024 AFL Women's All-Australian team
B:	Chelsea Biddell (Adelaide)	Brenna Tarrant (Sydney)	
HB:	Tilly Lucas-Rodd (Hawthorn)	Emma O'Driscoll (Fremantle)	Maddi Gay (Essendon)
C:	Sophie Conway (Brisbane)	Ash Riddell (North Melbourne)	Ella Roberts (West Coast)
HF:	Aisling McCarthy (Fremantle)	Aishling Moloney (Geelong)	Aileen Gilroy (Hawthorn)
F:	Caitlin Gould (Adelaide)	Taylor Smith (Brisbane)	
Foll:	Mim Strom (Fremantle)	Jasmine Garner (North Melbourne) (captain)	Ebony Marinoff (Adelaide) (vice-captain)
Int:	Chelsea Randall (Adelaide)	Charlie Rowbottom (Gold Coast)	Alice O'Loughlin (North Melbourne)
Int:	Ally Anderson (Brisbane)	Belle Dawes (Brisbane)	
Coach:	Darren Crocker (North Melbourne)		

Note: the position of coach in the AFL Women's All-Australian team is traditionally awarded to the coach of the premiership-winning team.
