= 2024 AFL Women's season =

Ninth season of the AFL Women's competition

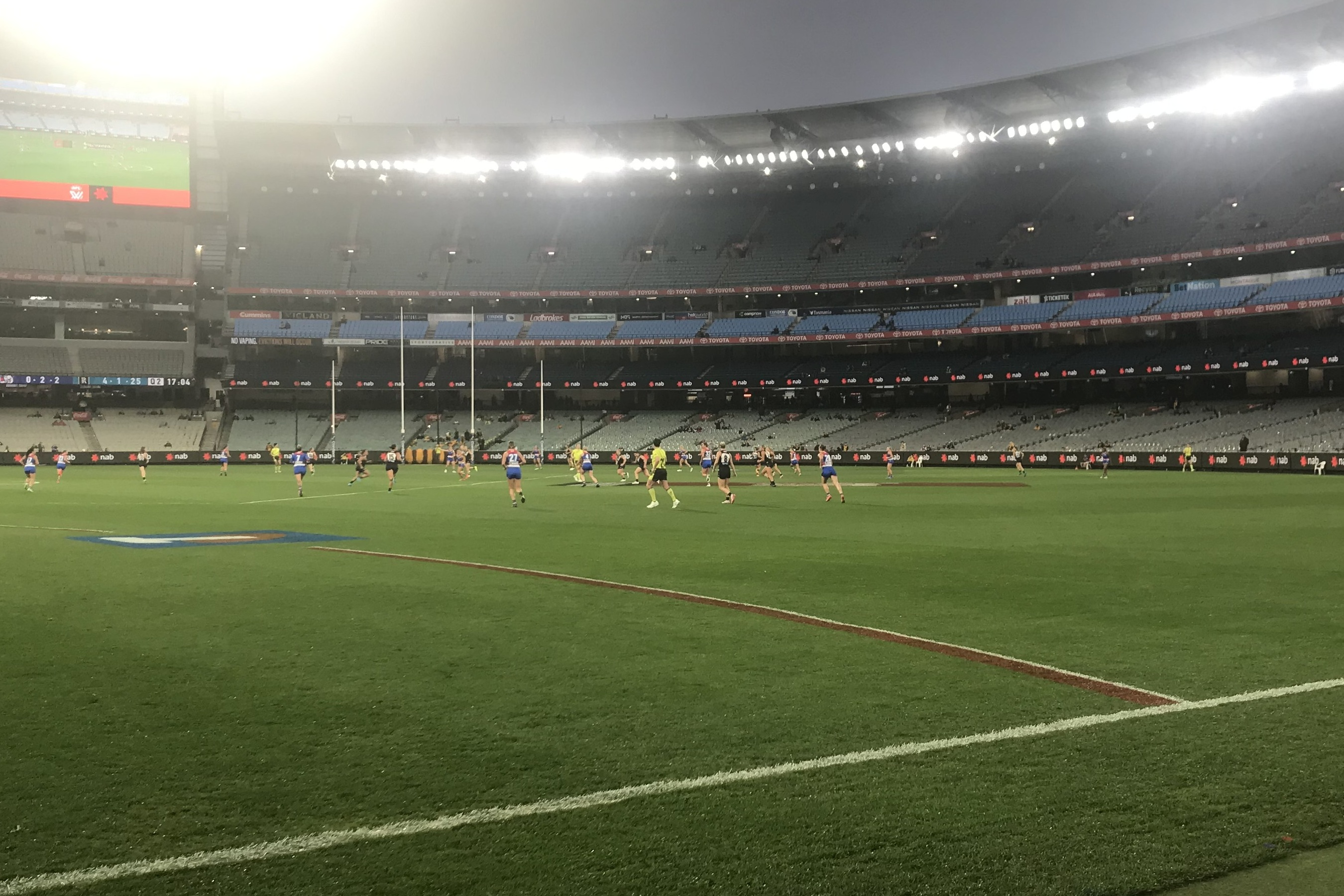
- Western Bulldogs and Port Adelaide players contest the football in week 2

Overview
- Date: 30 August – 30 November 2024
- Teams: 18
- Premiers: North Melbourne; 1st premiership
- Runners-up: Brisbane; 4th runners-up result
- Minor premiers: North Melbourne; 1st minor premiership
- Best and fairest: Ebony Marinoff (Adelaide); 23 votes
- Leading goalkicker: Aishling Moloney (Geelong); Taylor Smith (Brisbane); 21 goals

Attendance
- Matches played: 108
- Total attendance: 308,661 (2,858 per match)
- Highest (H&A): 23,085 (week 2, Western Bulldogs v Port Adelaide)
- Highest (finals): 12,122 (grand final, North Melbourne v Brisbane)

The 2024 AFL Women's season was the ninth season of the AFL Women's (AFLW) competition, the highest-level senior women's Australian rules football competition in Australia. The season featured 18 clubs and ran from 30 August to 30 November, comprising an eleven-match home-and-away season over ten weeks, followed by a four-week finals series featuring the top eight clubs.

North Melbourne won the premiership, defeating Brisbane by 30 points in the 2024 AFL Women's Grand Final. North Melbourne won the minor premiership by finishing atop the home-and-away ladder with a 10–0–1 win–loss–draw record and, by winning its three finals, recorded an undefeated season for the first time in the competition's history. Adelaide's Ebony Marinoff won the AFL Women's best and fairest award as the league's best and fairest player, while Geelong's Aishling Moloney and Brisbane's Taylor Smith tied for the AFL Women's leading goalkicker award as the league's leading goalkickers.

== Background ==
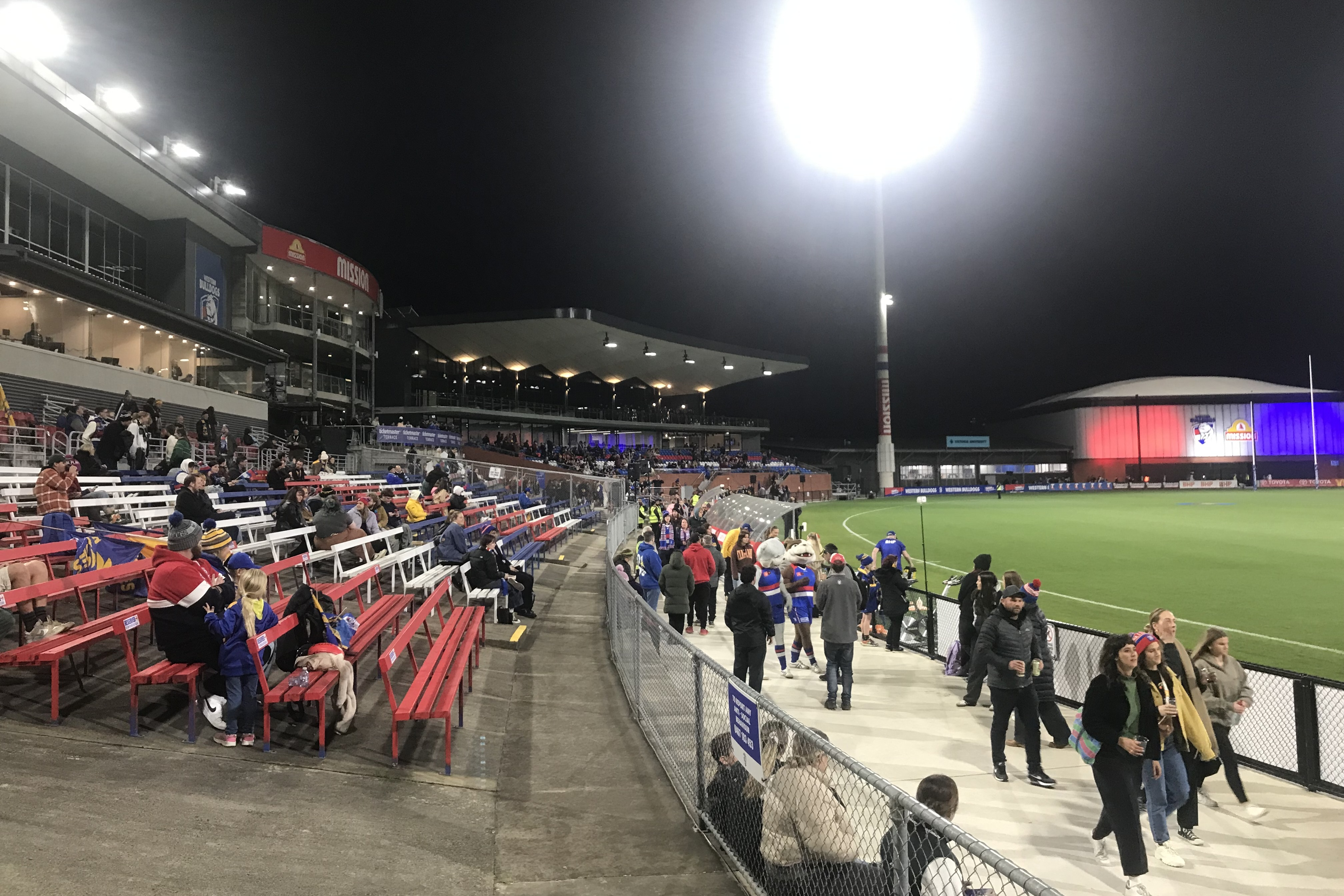
A view of Mission Whitten Oval prior to its first match since completion of venue redevelopments in week 3

In February 2024, Australian Football League (AFL) executive general manager Laura Kane announced that pre-season training for the 2024 season would commence on 3 June, and that the season would begin during the last weekend of August, coinciding with the AFL's pre-finals bye weekend, as had been the case the previous two seasons. In February, an eleven-match home-and-away season was confirmed, an increase from ten matches in 2023, along with four weeks of finals. Although players were on twelve-month contracts for the first time, the announcement came earlier than in previous seasons following requests from players to allow sufficient notice to plan living and work arrangements. Clubs had offered voluntary training during the off-season, with some allowing select players to play in state league competitions for additional exposure.

The 2024 season fixture was released in May, with the eleven-match home-and-away season scheduled over ten weeks. The compressed period of the season took place during weeks 4 to 7, with each club playing two matches in one of the four weeks; consequently, the fixture was divided by weeks rather than rounds, and matches were played on Tuesdays, Wednesdays and Thursdays during the compressed period to align with school holidays across Australia and focus on increased attendance and television viewership. Leading into the season, reigning grand finalists North Melbourne and Brisbane were heavily favoured to at least make the grand final again in 2024, with experts from Code Sports and ESPN predicting that one of the two clubs would win the premiership and 17 of the 18 club captains tipping either North Melbourne or Brisbane as the club most likely to reach the grand final outside of their own.

== Coach appointments ==
New coach	Club	Date of appointment	Previous coach	Ref.
Daisy Pearce	West Coast	11 December 2023	Michael Prior	
Sam Wright	Collingwood	22 December 2023	Stephen Symonds	
Daniel Webster	Hawthorn	5 February 2024	Bec Goddard	
Tamara Hyett	Western Bulldogs	16 February 2024	Nathan Burke	

== Club leadership ==
Club	Coach	Leadership group		
Club	Coach	Captain(s)	Vice-captain(s)	Other leader(s)
Adelaide	Matthew Clarke	Sarah Allan, Ebony Marinoff		Jessica Allan, Najwa Allen, Anne Hatchard, Eloise Jones
Brisbane	Craig Starcevich	Breanna Koenen	Nat Grider	Ally Anderson, Sophie Conway, Belle Dawes, Cathy Svarc
Carlton	Mathew Buck	Kerryn Peterson	Mimi Hill, Abbie McKay	
Collingwood	Sam Wright	Brianna Davey	Jordyn Allen, Brittany Bonnici, Ruby Schleicher	Lauren Butler, Mikala Cann, Sabrina Frederick
Essendon	Natalie Wood	Steph Cain, Bonnie Toogood		Sophie Alexander, Maddi Gay, Bess Keaney
Fremantle	Lisa Webb	Angelique Stannett	Hayley Miller, Laura Pugh, Aine Tighe	Ashleigh Brazill, Emma O'Driscoll
Geelong	Daniel Lowther	Meg McDonald	Nina Morrison, Becky Webster	Mikayla Bowen, Chantel Emonson, Amy McDonald
Gold Coast	Cameron Joyce	Tara Bohanna	Jacqui Dupuy	Georgia Clayden, Charlie Rowbottom, Claudia Whitfort
Greater Western Sydney	Cameron Bernasconi	Rebecca Beeson	Katherine Smith	Tarni Evans, Alyce Parker
Hawthorn	Daniel Webster	Emily Bates	Eliza West	Jasmine Fleming, Tilly Lucas-Rodd, Jenna Richardson
Melbourne	Mick Stinear	Kate Hore	Tyla Hanks	Sarah Lampard, Paxy Paxman
North Melbourne	Darren Crocker	Emma Kearney	Jasmine Garner	Libby Birch, Bella Eddey, Jasmine Ferguson, Ash Riddell, Kate Shierlaw
Port Adelaide	Lauren Arnell	Janelle Cuthbertson	Justine Mules-Robinson	Ange Foley, Ashleigh Saint
Richmond	Ryan Ferguson	Katie Brennan	Tessa Lavey, Gabby Seymour	Monique Conti, Sarah Hosking
St Kilda	Nick Dal Santo	Hannah Priest	Bianca Jakobsson	Georgia Patrikios, Tyanna Smith, Serene Watson
Sydney	Scott Gowans	Lucy McEvoy, Chloe Molloy		
West Coast	Daisy Pearce	Emma Swanson	Bella Lewis, Charlie Thomas	Jess Hosking, Matilda Sergeant
Western Bulldogs	Tamara Hyett	Deanna Berry		Elle Bennetts, Ellie Blackburn, Jess Fitzgerald, Isabella Grant, Isabelle Pritchard

== Pre-season ==
All starting times are local time. Source: afl.com.au

	Official practice matches
Friday, 16 August (1:30 pm)	West Coast 3.5 (23)	def. by	St Kilda 8.7 (55)	Mineral Resources Park
Friday, 16 August (7:15 pm)	Brisbane 5.7 (37)	def.	Richmond 5.5 (35)	Brighton Homes Arena
Saturday, 17 August (11:00 am)	Greater Western Sydney 3.2 (20)	def. by	North Melbourne 11.11 (77)	Blacktown ISP Oval
Saturday, 17 August (10:00 am)	Fremantle 6.9 (45)	def.	Collingwood 2.3 (15)	Fremantle Community Bank Oval
Saturday, 17 August (1:00 pm)	Essendon 4.9 (33)	def.	Geelong 3.5 (23)	Windy Hill
Saturday, 17 August (2:00 pm)	Sydney 4.4 (28)	def. by	Hawthorn 11.11 (77)	Sydney Cricket Ground
Saturday, 17 August (5:15 pm)	Gold Coast 10.8 (68)	def.	Western Bulldogs 3.2 (20)	People First Stadium
Sunday, 18 August (11:00 am)	Port Adelaide 9.8 (62)	def.	Melbourne 8.4 (52)	Alberton Oval
Sunday, 18 August (1:00 pm)	Adelaide 7.8 (50)	def.	Carlton 5.2 (32)	Thomas Farms Oval

== Overview ==
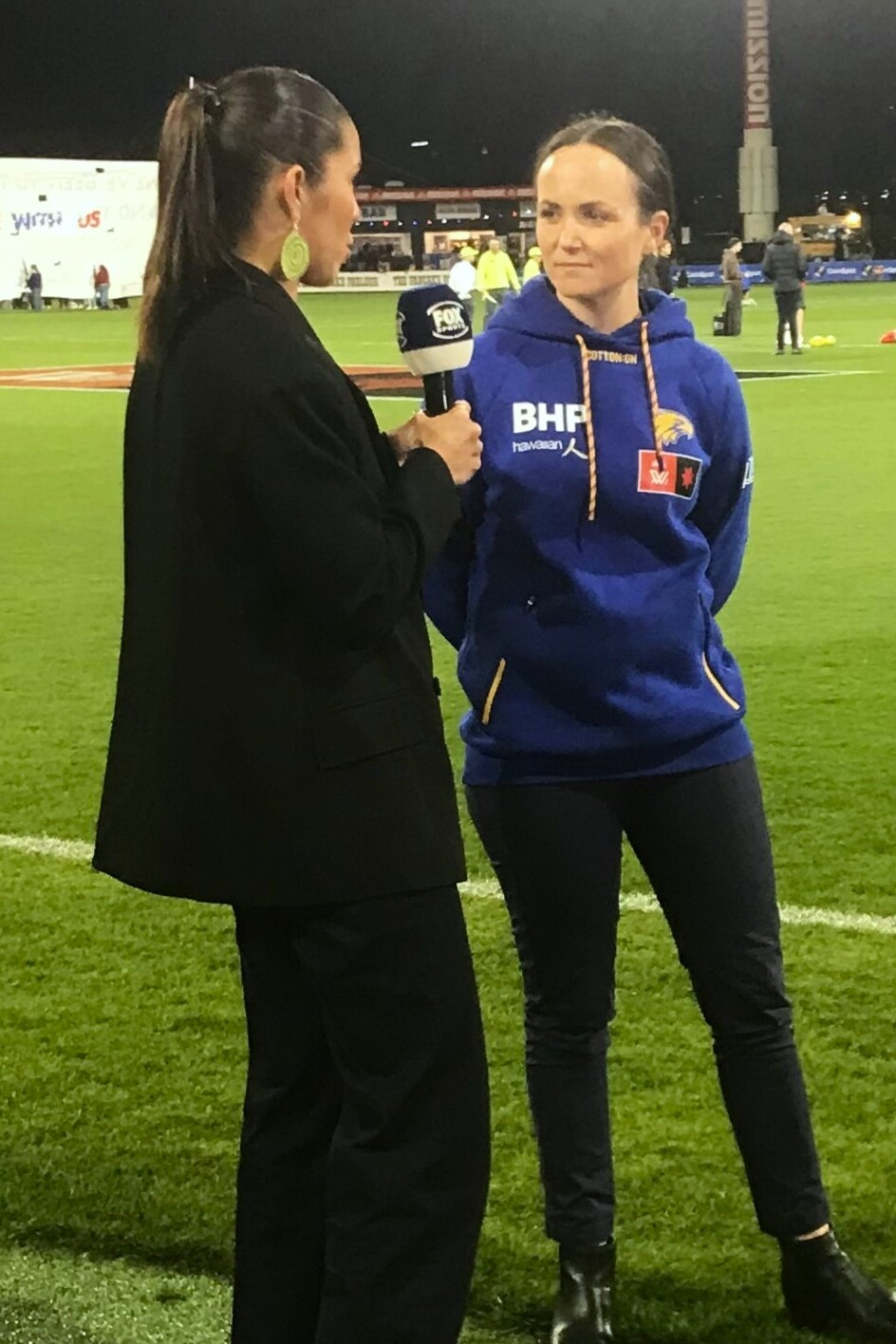
New West Coast coach Daisy Pearce (right) coached the club to its best AFLW season in 2024.

The season began on 30 August with a match between Sydney and Collingwood, and concluded on 30 November with the 2024 AFL Women's Grand Final. All matches throughout the season were broadcast live on the Seven Network, Fox Footy and Kayo. Sydney was awarded the right to host the opening match of the season after averaging the highest home crowds during the 2023 home-and-away season with 4,637, more than 2,000 over the league average; the match marked the first time the season opener was held outside of Victoria. The Dreamtime match between Essendon and Richmond, to take place during Indigenous Round in week 9, will be played in Darwin for the first time, while Sydney hosted Richmond in the competition's first match in Coffs Harbour in week 3; the season was the first to not feature a Hampson–Hardeman Cup between Melbourne and the Western Bulldogs. The season marked an AFLW record for female senior coaches with five, including new coaches Tamara Hyett (Western Bulldogs) and Daisy Pearce (West Coast).

In August, the AFL announced that a new "smart footy" ball-tracking technology would be introduced for the upcoming season at all venues, in which a chip is embedded in the football and tracked by sensors around the field; the system, which had been trialled for 18 months (including at Victorian Football League (VFL) and VFL Women's (VFLW) level), would be used to assist with reviewing scores, including alerting officials when the football crosses the goal line, hits the goal post or is touched mid-shot. After the technology was successfully used twice in week 1, marking the first use of a score review system in the AFLW, AFL general manager of footy operations Josh Mahoney said that the league would work towards implementing graphics in television broadcasts and at venues to give fans an insight into the review process, similar to the replays used for score reviews in the AFL.

== Home-and-away season ==
All starting times are local time. Source: afl.com.au

=== Week 1 ===
	Week 1
Friday, 30 August (7:15 pm)	Sydney 8.2 (50)	def.	Collingwood 4.11 (35)	North Sydney Oval (crowd: 5,489)	Report; Stats
Friday, 30 August (7:15 pm)	West Coast 6.4 (40)	def.	Richmond 5.9 (39)	Mineral Resources Park (crowd: 2,166)	Report; Stats
Saturday, 31 August (1:05 pm)	Greater Western Sydney 10.12 (72)	def.	Western Bulldogs 1.3 (9)	Manuka Oval (crowd: 2,003)	Report; Stats
Saturday, 31 August (3:05 pm)	Essendon 3.3 (21)	def. by	Fremantle 10.4 (64)	Windy Hill (crowd: 2,820)	Report; Stats
Saturday, 31 August (5:05 pm)	Gold Coast 2.8 (20)	def. by	St Kilda 11.8 (74)	People First Stadium (crowd: 1,749)	Report; Stats
Saturday, 31 August (7:15 pm)	Geelong 6.4 (40)	def. by	Melbourne 6.6 (42)	GMHBA Stadium (crowd: 3,838)	Report; Stats
Saturday, 31 August (7:15 pm)	Port Adelaide 5.5 (35)	def. by	Adelaide 7.7 (49)	Alberton Oval (crowd: 5,194)	Report; Stats
Sunday, 1 September (1:05 pm)	Hawthorn 9.12 (66)	def.	Carlton 4.4 (28)	Kinetic Stadium (crowd: 2,794)	Report; Stats
Sunday, 1 September (3:05 pm)	Brisbane 5.4 (34)	def. by	North Melbourne 12.6 (78)	Brighton Homes Arena (crowd: 3,395)	Report; Stats
Greater Western Sydney's score of 10.12 (72) against the Western Bulldogs was its highest ever.; North Melbourne's score of 12.6 (78) was the highest ever conceded by Brisbane.

=== Week 2 ===
	Week 2
Friday, 6 September (4:30 pm)	Western Bulldogs 0.6 (6)	def. by	Port Adelaide 7.4 (46)	Melbourne Cricket Ground (crowd: 23,085)	Report; Stats
Saturday, 7 September (11:05 am)	Melbourne 2.3 (15)	def. by	Brisbane 5.3 (33)	Casey Fields (crowd: 1,534)	Report; Stats
Saturday, 7 September (11:05 am)	West Coast 3.7 (25)	def. by	Essendon 6.5 (41)	Mineral Resources Park (crowd: 2,079)	Report; Stats
Saturday, 7 September (1:05 pm)	Collingwood 3.8 (26)	def. by	Hawthorn 11.7 (73)	Victoria Park (crowd: 3,283)	Report; Stats
Sunday, 8 September (1:05 pm)	Richmond 5.8 (38)	def.	Greater Western Sydney 4.3 (27)	Swinburne Centre (crowd: 997)	Report; Stats
Sunday, 8 September (1:05 pm)	Gold Coast 5.8 (38)	def. by	Carlton 5.9 (39)	Great Barrier Reef Arena (crowd: 1,319)	Report; Stats
Sunday, 8 September (3:05 pm)	North Melbourne 5.6 (36)	drew with	Geelong 5.6 (36)	Arden Street Oval (crowd: 3,019)	Report; Stats
Sunday, 8 September (3:05 pm)	St Kilda 6.6 (42)	def.	Sydney 4.2 (26)	RSEA Park (crowd: 2,694)	Report; Stats
Sunday, 8 September (3:05 pm)	Fremantle 0.6 (6)	def. by	Adelaide 5.9 (39)	Fremantle Community Bank Oval (crowd: 2,669)	Report; Stats
The Western Bulldogs v Port Adelaide match was originally scheduled to be played at 5:05 pm at Mission Whitten Oval, but was moved to the Melbourne Cricket Ground and rescheduled to 4:30 pm to act as a curtain raiser to the AFL elimination final between the Western Bulldogs and Hawthorn; fans already holding tickets for either match would be able to access both matches.

=== Week 3 ===
	Week 3
Thursday, 12 September (7:15 pm)	Western Bulldogs 3.3 (21)	def. by	West Coast 5.2 (32)	Mission Whitten Oval (crowd: 1,545)	Report; Stats
Friday, 13 September (5:05 pm)	Brisbane 10.12 (72)	def.	Collingwood 3.2 (20)	Brighton Homes Arena (crowd: 2,168)	Report; Stats
Saturday, 14 September (12:35 pm)	Sydney 3.4 (22)	def. by	Richmond 10.8 (68)	C.ex Coffs International Stadium (crowd: 2,279)	Report; Stats
Saturday, 14 September (2:35 pm)	Carlton 4.5 (29)	def.	Geelong 0.5 (5)	Ikon Park (crowd: 2,417)	Report; Stats
Saturday, 14 September (4:05 pm)	Port Adelaide 4.5 (29)	def. by	Fremantle 5.7 (37)	Alberton Oval (crowd: 2,016)	Report; Stats
Sunday, 15 September (12:35 pm)	Adelaide 9.4 (58)	def.	Hawthorn 4.8 (32)	Thomas Farms Oval (crowd: 3,142)	Report; Stats
Sunday, 15 September (1:05 pm)	Melbourne 3.3 (21)	def. by	North Melbourne 11.5 (71)	Casey Fields (crowd: 2,023)	Report; Stats
Sunday, 15 September (3:05 pm)	Essendon 2.3 (15)	def. by	St Kilda 3.5 (23)	Windy Hill (crowd: 3,009)	Report; Stats
Sunday, 15 September (5:05 pm)	Greater Western Sydney 5.6 (36)	drew with	Gold Coast 5.6 (36)	Manuka Oval (crowd: 1,507)	Report; Stats
Jamie Stanton (Gold Coast) kicked a goal after the final siren to draw the match against Greater Western Sydney.

=== Week 4 ===
	Week 4
Tuesday, 17 September (7:15 pm)	Collingwood 3.1 (19)	def. by	West Coast 5.6 (36)	Ikon Park (crowd: 1,325)	Report; Stats
Wednesday, 18 September (7:15 pm)	Brisbane 11.15 (81)	def.	Western Bulldogs 5.4 (34)	Brighton Homes Arena (crowd: 2,712)	Report; Stats
Thursday, 19 September (7:15 pm)	Richmond 6.3 (39)	def.	Carlton 0.6 (6)	Ikon Park (crowd: 1,855)	Report; Stats
Friday, 20 September (5:05 pm)	North Melbourne 6.6 (42)	def.	Port Adelaide 1.0 (6)	Mission Whitten Oval (crowd: 943)	Report; Stats
Saturday, 21 September (12:05 pm)	Gold Coast 4.3 (27)	def. by	Geelong 15.6 (96)	People First Stadium (crowd: 1,612)	Report; Stats
Saturday, 21 September (2:05 pm)	St Kilda 2.5 (17)	def. by	Hawthorn 11.8 (74)	RSEA Park (crowd: 2,822)	Report; Stats
Saturday, 21 September (12:05 pm)	Fremantle 7.5 (47)	def.	Melbourne 6.5 (41)	Fremantle Community Bank Oval (crowd: 1,633)	Report; Stats
Sunday, 22 September (12:35 pm)	Adelaide 9.8 (62)	def.	Essendon 4.5 (29)	Thomas Farms Oval (crowd: 2,311)	Report; Stats
Sunday, 22 September (3:05 pm)	Collingwood 2.3 (15)	def. by	Western Bulldogs 9.3 (57)	Victoria Park (crowd: 2,430)	Report; Stats
Sunday, 22 September (3:05 pm)	Sydney 6.7 (43)	def.	Greater Western Sydney 6.4 (40)	Henson Park (crowd: 5,530)	Report; Stats
Sunday, 22 September (3:05 pm)	West Coast 2.4 (16)	def. by	Brisbane 8.13 (61)	Mineral Resources Park (crowd: 1,765)	Report; Stats
West Coast's win over Collingwood marked the first time the club won consecutive matches and the first time it won three matches in a season.; North Melbourne recorded 122 tackles against Port Adelaide, an AFLW record.; St Kilda's 57-point loss to Hawthorn was its biggest ever.; Aisling McCarthy (Fremantle) kicked a goal after the final siren to win the match against Melbourne.

=== Week 5 ===
	Week 5
Tuesday, 24 September (7:15 pm)	Richmond 6.12 (48)	def.	Port Adelaide 3.9 (27)	Ikon Park (crowd: 1,493)	Report; Stats
Wednesday, 25 September (7:15 pm)	Carlton 1.4 (10)	def. by	North Melbourne 12.7 (79)	Ikon Park (crowd: 2,027)	Report; Stats
Thursday, 26 September (7:15 pm)	Geelong 9.7 (61)	def. by	Hawthorn 12.7 (79)	GMHBA Stadium (crowd: 2,771)	Report; Stats
Friday, 27 September (12:05 pm)	Collingwood 4.3 (27)	def.	Gold Coast 3.6 (24)	Swinburne Centre (crowd: 1,492)	Report; Stats
Friday, 27 September (2:05 pm)	Essendon 11.6 (72)	def.	Melbourne 1.1 (7)	Windy Hill (crowd: 3,325)	Report; Stats
Friday, 27 September (4:05 pm)	St Kilda 2.2 (14)	def. by	Fremantle 3.7 (25)	RSEA Park (crowd: 2,176)	Report; Stats
Friday, 27 September (7:15 pm)	Western Bulldogs 5.9 (39)	def.	Sydney 5.2 (32)	Mission Whitten Oval (crowd: 2,856)	Report; Stats
Sunday, 29 September (1:05 pm)	North Melbourne 3.9 (27)	def.	Richmond 2.3 (15)	University of Tasmania Stadium (crowd: 753)	Report; Stats
Sunday, 29 September (3:05 pm)	Greater Western Sydney 6.4 (40)	def. by	West Coast 10.4 (64)	Henson Park (crowd: 938)	Report; Stats
Sunday, 29 September (3:05 pm)	Brisbane 5.5 (35)	def.	Adelaide 5.3 (33)	Brighton Homes Arena (crowd: 6,102)	Report; Stats
Sunday, 29 September (4:35 pm)	Port Adelaide 8.10 (58)	def.	Carlton 3.5 (23)	Alberton Oval (crowd: 1,706)	Report; Stats
North Melbourne's 69-point win over Carlton was its biggest ever.; The margin of 65 points in the Essendon v Melbourne match was Essendon's biggest ever win and Melbourne's biggest ever loss.; Melbourne's score of 1.1 (7) against Essendon was its lowest ever.; West Coast's score of 10.4 (64) against Greater Western Sydney was its highest ever.

=== Week 6 ===
	Week 6
Tuesday, 1 October (7:15 pm)	Geelong 3.9 (27)	def. by	Fremantle 6.9 (45)	GMHBA Stadium (crowd: 2,033)	Report; Stats
Wednesday, 2 October (5:15 pm)	Hawthorn 4.11 (35)	def.	Gold Coast 3.4 (22)	Kinetic Stadium (crowd: 2,291)	Report; Stats
Wednesday, 2 October (7:15 pm)	Essendon 4.3 (27)	def.	Sydney 3.6 (24)	Mission Whitten Oval (crowd: 1,460)	Report; Stats
Thursday, 3 October (7:15 pm)	Melbourne 6.5 (41)	def.	Greater Western Sydney 3.7 (25)	Ikon Park (crowd: 1,264)	Report; Stats
Friday, 4 October (7:15 pm)	Adelaide 3.8 (26)	def.	St Kilda 3.4 (22)	Norwood Oval (crowd: 2,994)	Report; Stats
Saturday, 5 October (1:05 pm)	North Melbourne 8.11 (59)	def.	Western Bulldogs 0.4 (4)	Arden Street Oval (crowd: 2,457)	Report; Stats
Saturday, 5 October (3:05 pm)	Richmond 7.4 (46)	def.	Collingwood 1.4 (10)	Swinburne Centre (crowd: 1,742)	Report; Stats
Saturday, 5 October (3:05 pm)	West Coast 5.6 (36)	def. by	Port Adelaide 7.7 (49)	Mineral Resources Park (crowd: 2,470)	Report; Stats
Saturday, 5 October (7:15 pm)	Carlton 1.7 (13)	def. by	Brisbane 9.14 (68)	Ikon Park (crowd: 1,452)	Report; Stats
Sunday, 6 October (12:05 pm)	Gold Coast 4.3 (27)	def. by	Essendon 5.6 (36)	People First Stadium (crowd: 1,329)	Report; Stats
Sunday, 6 October (3:05 pm)	Sydney 6.5 (41)	def. by	Geelong 5.14 (44)	Henson Park (crowd: 3,127)	Report; Stats
Sunday, 6 October (2:05 pm)	Fremantle 3.7 (25)	def. by	Hawthorn 5.4 (34)	Fremantle Community Bank Oval (crowd: 2,259)	Report; Stats

=== Week 7 ===
	Week 7 (Pride Round)
Tuesday, 8 October (7:15 pm)	St Kilda 7.7 (49)	def.	Greater Western Sydney 2.3 (15)	Kinetic Stadium (crowd: 1,427)	Report; Stats
Wednesday, 9 October (7:15 pm)	Adelaide 1.8 (14)	def. by	Melbourne 2.4 (16)	Norwood Oval (crowd: 2,586)	Report; Stats
Thursday, 10 October (7:15 pm)	Port Adelaide 4.9 (33)	def.	Collingwood 3.7 (25)	Alberton Oval (crowd: 2,526)	Report; Stats
Friday, 11 October (7:15 pm)	Western Bulldogs 0.3 (3)	def. by	Essendon 3.8 (26)	Mission Whitten Oval (crowd: 4,011)	Report; Stats
Saturday, 12 October (1:05 pm)	Hawthorn 11.8 (74)	def.	West Coast 1.2 (8)	Kinetic Stadium (crowd: 2,357)	Report; Stats
Saturday, 12 October (3:05 pm)	Richmond 6.10 (46)	def.	Geelong 5.9 (39)	Swinburne Centre (crowd: 2,455)	Report; Stats
Saturday, 12 October (4:05 pm)	Brisbane 6.8 (44)	def.	Gold Coast 4.4 (28)	Brighton Homes Arena (crowd: 3,142)	Report; Stats
Saturday, 12 October (4:15 pm)	Fremantle 4.6 (30)	def. by	Carlton 5.4 (34)	Fremantle Community Bank Oval (crowd: 2,051)	Report; Stats
Sunday, 13 October (1:05 pm)	North Melbourne 14.3 (87)	def.	Sydney 4.3 (27)	North Hobart Oval (crowd: 1,515)	Report; Stats
Sunday, 13 October (3:05 pm)	St Kilda 5.0 (30)	def. by	Melbourne 6.8 (44)	RSEA Park (crowd: 3,073)	Report; Stats
Sunday, 13 October (5:05 pm)	Greater Western Sydney 4.4 (28)	def. by	Adelaide 14.8 (92)	Henson Park (crowd: 1,061)	Report; Stats
Ebony Marinoff (Adelaide) recorded her 2,000th career disposal during the match against Melbourne, becoming the first AFLW player to do so.; Hawthorn's 66-point win over West Coast was its biggest ever.; The Western Bulldogs' score of 0.3 (3) against Essendon was its lowest ever.

=== Week 8 ===
	Week 8
Thursday, 17 October (7:15 pm)	Carlton 4.4 (28)	def. by	Western Bulldogs 9.7 (61)	Ikon Park (crowd: 1,320)	Report; Stats
Friday, 18 October (7:15 pm)	Port Adelaide 7.5 (47)	def.	St Kilda 5.2 (32)	Alberton Oval (crowd: 2,486)	Report; Stats
Saturday, 19 October (1:05 pm)	Hawthorn 9.7 (61)	def.	Greater Western Sydney 3.6 (24)	Kinetic Stadium (crowd: 2,106)	Report; Stats
Saturday, 19 October (3:05 pm)	Sydney 6.10 (46)	def. by	Gold Coast 7.8 (50)	Henson Park (crowd: 2,570)	Report; Stats
Saturday, 19 October (5:05 pm)	Melbourne 8.3 (51)	def.	Richmond 5.8 (38)	Casey Fields (crowd: 2,026)	Report; Stats
Saturday, 19 October (4:05 pm)	West Coast 1.6 (12)	def. by	Fremantle 5.5 (35)	Sullivan Logistics Stadium (crowd: 6,047)	Report; Stats
Sunday, 20 October (1:05 pm)	Geelong 7.5 (47)	def.	Brisbane 5.7 (37)	GMHBA Stadium (crowd: 2,850)	Report; Stats
Sunday, 20 October (3:05 pm)	Essendon 1.1 (7)	def. by	North Melbourne 8.10 (58)	Windy Hill (crowd: 4,336)	Report; Stats
Sunday, 20 October (5:05 pm)	Collingwood 2.1 (13)	def. by	Adelaide 8.8 (56)	Victoria Park (crowd: 1,775)	Report; Stats
The West Coast v Fremantle match was originally scheduled to be played at Optus Stadium, but was moved to Sullivan Logistics Stadium so that the former could undergo turf redevelopment prior to the Test cricket match between Australia and India in November.; Essendon's score of 1.1 (7) against North Melbourne was its lowest ever.; Essendon's 51-point loss to North Melbourne was its biggest ever.

=== Week 9 ===
	Week 9 (Indigenous Round week 1)
Thursday, 24 October (6:45 pm)	Hawthorn 3.5 (23)	def.	Melbourne 2.5 (17)	Cazalys Stadium (crowd: 2,602)	Report; Stats
Friday, 25 October (7:15 pm)	Adelaide 4.9 (33)	def. by	North Melbourne 6.5 (41)	Norwood Oval (crowd: 3,275)	Report; Stats
Saturday, 26 October (2:05 pm)	Greater Western Sydney 4.1 (25)	def. by	Fremantle 7.13 (55)	Henson Park (crowd: 1,335)	Report; Stats
Saturday, 26 October (3:05 pm)	Gold Coast 3.6 (24)	def. by	Port Adelaide 8.10 (58)	People First Stadium (crowd: 2,160)	Report; Stats
Saturday, 26 October (3:05 pm)	West Coast 3.5 (23)	def. by	Geelong 9.2 (56)	Mineral Resources Park (crowd: 2,015)	Report; Stats
Saturday, 26 October (7:15 pm)	Essendon 6.6 (42)	drew with	Richmond 6.6 (42)	TIO Stadium (crowd: 4,407)	Report; Stats
Sunday, 27 October (1:05 pm)	Western Bulldogs 5.6 (36)	def.	St Kilda 5.5 (35)	Mars Stadium (crowd: 1,918)	Report; Stats
Sunday, 27 October (3:05 pm)	Collingwood 4.4 (28)	def. by	Carlton 5.2 (32)	Victoria Park (crowd: 2,873)	Report; Stats
Sunday, 27 October (4:05 pm)	Brisbane 11.12 (78)	def.	Sydney 1.4 (10)	Brighton Homes Arena (crowd: 3,117)	Report; Stats

=== Week 10 ===
	Week 10 (Indigenous Round week 2)
Friday, 1 November (7:15 pm)	Geelong 4.4 (28)	def. by	Adelaide 4.8 (32)	GMHBA Stadium (crowd: 2,233)	Report; Stats
Saturday, 2 November (1:05 pm)	Melbourne 11.8 (74)	def.	Collingwood 4.3 (27)	Ikon Park (crowd: 1,854)	Report; Stats
Saturday, 2 November (3:05 pm)	Sydney 10.14 (74)	def.	West Coast 4.4 (28)	Henson Park (crowd: 2,685)	Report; Stats
Saturday, 2 November (5:05 pm)	North Melbourne 11.12 (78)	def.	Gold Coast 2.3 (15)	Arden Street Oval (crowd: 2,162)	Report; Stats
Saturday, 2 November (7:15 pm)	Carlton 3.6 (24)	def. by	Essendon 9.6 (60)	Ikon Park (crowd: 2,655)	Report; Stats
Sunday, 3 November (1:05 pm)	St Kilda 6.5 (41)	def. by	Brisbane 10.8 (68)	RSEA Park (crowd: 1,678)	Report; Stats
Sunday, 3 November (3:05 pm)	Richmond 3.5 (23)	def. by	Hawthorn 6.10 (46)	Swinburne Centre (crowd: 2,087)	Report; Stats
Sunday, 3 November (4:35 pm)	Port Adelaide 7.1 (43)	def.	Greater Western Sydney 6.6 (42)	Alberton Oval (crowd: 4,148)	Report; Stats
Sunday, 3 November (4:05 pm)	Fremantle 4.11 (35)	def.	Western Bulldogs 3.3 (21)	Fremantle Community Bank Oval (crowd: 2,520)	Report; Stats

== Ladder ==
Pos	Team	Pld	W	L	D	PF	PA	PP	Pts	Qualification
1	North Melbourne (P)	11	10	0	1	656	208	315.4	42	Finals series
2	Hawthorn	11	10	1	0	597	309	193.2	40	Finals series
3	Brisbane	11	9	2	0	611	335	182.4	36	Finals series
4	Adelaide	11	8	3	0	494	285	173.3	32	Finals series
5	Fremantle	11	8	3	0	404	297	136.0	32	Finals series
6	Port Adelaide	11	7	4	0	431	364	118.4	28	Finals series
7	Richmond	11	6	4	1	442	337	131.2	26	Finals series
8	Essendon	11	6	4	1	376	359	104.7	26	Finals series
9	Melbourne	11	6	5	0	369	420	87.9	24	
10	Geelong	11	4	6	1	479	437	109.6	18	
11	St Kilda	11	4	7	0	379	396	95.7	16	
12	Western Bulldogs	11	4	7	0	291	461	63.1	16	
13	West Coast	11	4	7	0	320	509	62.9	16	
14	Carlton	11	4	7	0	266	532	50.0	16	
15	Sydney	11	3	8	0	395	538	73.4	12	
16	Greater Western Sydney	11	1	9	1	374	531	70.4	6	
17	Gold Coast	11	1	9	1	311	569	54.7	6	
18	Collingwood	11	1	10	0	245	553	44.3	4	

Source: afl.com.au
Rules for classification: 1) points; 2) percentage; 3) number of points for
(P) Premiers

== Progression by round ==
For readability purposes, weeks 4 to 7 are split into each club's five matches, with no fixed ladder positions being given for the first four matches of this period due to the spread of matches.

4	Finished the round in first place	0	Finished the round in last place
4	Won the minor premiership	0	Finished the season in last place
4	Finished the round inside the top eight		
4_{1}	Subscript indicates the ladder position at the end of the round		

Team	W1	W2	W3	Weeks 4–7					W8	W9	W10
Team	W1	W2	W3	1	2	3	4	5	W8	W9	W10
North Melbourne	4_{5}	6_{4}	10_{3}	14	18	22	26	30_{1}	34_{1}	38_{1}	42_{1}
Hawthorn	4_{4}	8_{1}	8_{5}	12	16	20	24	28_{2}	32_{2}	36_{2}	40_{2}
Brisbane	0_{14}	4_{12}	8_{6}	12	16	20	24	28_{3}	28_{4}	32_{3}	36_{3}
Adelaide	4_{7}	8_{3}	12_{2}	16	16	20	20	24_{4}	28_{3}	28_{4}	32_{4}
Fremantle	4_{3}	4_{7}	8_{7}	12	16	20	20	20_{6}	24_{6}	28_{5}	32_{5}
Port Adelaide	0_{12}	4_{6}	4_{11}	4	4	8	12	16_{9}	20_{7}	24_{7}	28_{6}
Richmond	0_{10}	4_{8}	8_{4}	12	16	16	20	24_{5}	24_{5}	26_{6}	26_{7}
Essendon	0_{16}	4_{13}	4_{12}	4	8	12	16	20_{7}	20_{8}	22_{8}	26_{8}
Melbourne	4_{8}	4_{11}	4_{14}	4	4	8	12	16_{11}	20_{9}	20_{9}	24_{9}
Geelong	0_{11}	2_{15}	2_{15}	6	6	6	10	10_{13}	14_{12}	18_{10}	18_{10}
St Kilda	4_{2}	8_{2}	12_{1}	12	12	12	16	16_{8}	16_{10}	16_{11}	16_{11}
Western Bulldogs	0_{18}	0_{18}	0_{18}	0	4	8	8	8_{15}	12_{13}	16_{13}	16_{12}
West Coast	4_{9}	4_{10}	8_{8}	12	12	16	16	16_{10}	16_{11}	16_{12}	16_{13}
Carlton	0_{15}	4_{14}	8_{9}	8	8	8	8	12_{12}	12_{14}	16_{14}	16_{14}
Sydney	4_{6}	4_{9}	4_{13}	8	8	8	8	8_{14}	8_{15}	8_{15}	12_{15}
Greater Western Sydney	4_{1}	4_{5}	6_{10}	6	6	6	6	6_{16}	6_{16}	6_{16}	6_{16}
Gold Coast	0_{17}	0_{16}	2_{16}	2	2	2	2	2_{18}	6_{17}	6_{17}	6_{17}
Collingwood	0_{13}	0_{17}	0_{17}	0	0	4	4	4_{17}	4_{18}	4_{18}	4_{18}

Source: Australian Football

== Home match attendance ==
The following table includes all home match attendance figures from the home-and-away season.

Team	Hosted	Total	Highest	Lowest	Average		
Team	Hosted	Total	Highest	Lowest	2023	2024	Change
Adelaide	5	14,308	3,275	2,311	4,073	2,862	▼1,211
Brisbane	6	20,636	6,102	2,168	2,912	3,439	▲527
Carlton	5	9,871	2,655	1,320	2,677	1,974	▼703
Collingwood	6	13,178	3,283	1,325	2,470	2,196	▼274
Essendon	6	19,357	4,407	1,460	2,954	3,226	▲272
Fremantle	5	11,132	2,669	1,633	2,405	2,226	▼179
Geelong	5	13,665	3,838	2,033	3,489	2,733	▼756
Gold Coast	5	8,169	2,160	1,319	1,460	1,634	▲174
Greater Western Sydney	5	6,844	2,003	938	1,478	1,369	▼109
Hawthorn	5	12.150	2,794	2,106	2,400	2,430	▲30
Melbourne	5	8,701	2,026	1,264	3,240	1,740	▼1,500
North Melbourne	6	10,923	3,019	753	2,016	1,821	▼195
Port Adelaide	6	18,076	5,194	1,706	2,373	3,013	▲640
Richmond	6	10,629	2,455	997	2,041	1,772	▼269
St Kilda	5	8,621	3,073	1,427	2,293	1,724	▼569
Sydney	6	21,680	5,530	2,279	4,637	3,613	▼1,024
West Coast	6	16,542	6,047	1,765	1,192	2,757	▲1,565
Western Bulldogs	5	33,415	23,085	1,545	2,425	6,683	▲4,258
Total/overall	99	263,162	23,085	753	2,585	2,658	▲73

Source: Australian Football

== Finals series ==
Qualifying and elimination finals
8 November, Ikon Park
1	North Melbourne	5.8 (38)
4	Adelaide	5.1 (31)
9 November, Fremantle Community Bank Oval
5	Fremantle	5.6 (36)
8	Essendon	4.2 (26)
10 November, Alberton Oval
6	Port Adelaide	11.6 (72)
7	Richmond	7.6 (48)
10 November, Ikon Park
2	Hawthorn	4.8 (32)
3	Brisbane	6.2 (38)

Semi-finals
16 November, Norwood Oval
Adelaide	7.7 (49)
Fremantle	1.6 (12)
16 November, Ikon Park
Hawthorn	6.13 (49)
Port Adelaide	7.8 (50)

Preliminary finals
23 November, Ikon Park
North Melbourne	12.6 (78)
Port Adelaide	2.9 (21)
23 November, Brighton Homes Arena
Brisbane	7.8 (50)
Adelaide	4.8 (32)

Grand final
30 November, Ikon Park
North Melbourne	6.3 (39)
Brisbane	1.3 (9)

All starting times are local time. Source: afl.com.au

=== Finals week 1 ===
First qualifying final
Friday, 8 November (7:15 pm)	North Melbourne 5.8 (38)	def.	Adelaide 5.1 (31)	Ikon Park (crowd: 3,689)	Report; Stats
2.1 (13); 2.1 (13); 5.4 (34); 5.8 (38)	Q1; Q2; Q3; Q4	2.0 (12); 3.0 (18); 4.0 (24); 5.1 (31)
Eddey 2, T. Randall, Shierlaw, Smith	Goals	Gould 2, C. Randall 2, Ponter
Garner, Riddell, Eddey, Shierlaw, M. King	Best	C. Randall, Marinoff, Gould, J. Allan, Ponter

First elimination final
Saturday, 9 November (4:00 pm)	Fremantle 5.6 (36)	def.	Essendon 4.2 (26)	Fremantle Community Bank Oval (crowd: 4,934)	Report; Stats
0.2 (2); 2.3 (15); 3.4 (22); 5.6 (36)	Q1; Q2; Q3; Q4	2.0 (12); 2.0 (12); 4.2 (26); 4.2 (26)
Lally, Miller, O'Sullivan, Runnalls, Strom	Goals	Bannister, A. Clarke, Gough, Walker
Strom, O'Driscoll, O'Sullivan, Newton, McCarthy, Runnalls	Best	Nanscawen, Morcom, Keaney, Cain, Gay

Second qualifying final
Sunday, 10 November (1:05 pm)	Hawthorn 4.8 (32)	def. by	Brisbane 6.2 (38)	Ikon Park (crowd: 4,985)	Report; Stats
2.5 (17); 3.6 (24); 3.7 (25); 4.8 (32)	Q1; Q2; Q3; Q4	2.1 (13); 2.1 (13); 5.1 (31); 6.2 (38)
Ashmore, Eardley, McDonagh, Stephenson	Goals	Davidson 2, C. Svarc 2, Hartill, Smith
Bates, Fleming, West, Richardson	Best	Koenen, Grider, R. Svarc, C. Svarc, Dunne

Second elimination final
Sunday, 10 November (2:35 pm)	Port Adelaide 11.6 (72)	def.	Richmond 7.6 (48)	Alberton Oval (crowd: 5,172)	Report; Stats
3.2 (20); 5.4 (34); 8.6 (54); 11.6 (72)	Q1; Q2; Q3; Q4	1.0 (6); 3.3 (21); 5.5 (35); 7.6 (48)
Saint 3, Houghton 2, Teakle 2, Boag, Lamb, Levicki, Wendland	Goals	Greiser 3, Brennan 2, Yassir 2
Dowrick, Scholz, Houghton, Saint, Lamb, Teakle	Best	Sheerin, Conti, Yassir, Greiser, Miller

=== Finals week 2 ===
First semi-final
Saturday, 16 November (3:05 pm)	Adelaide 7.7 (49)	def.	Fremantle 1.6 (12)	Norwood Oval (crowd: 2,011)	Report; Stats
1.1 (7); 5.3 (33); 7.5 (47); 7.7 (49)	Q1; Q2; Q3; Q4	0.3 (3); 0.4 (4); 1.5 (11); 1.6 (12)
Ballard, Levy, Marinoff, Martin, Munyard, Ponter, Randall	Goals	Seth
Marinoff, J. Allan, Newman, Prowse, Randall, Hatchard	Best	Newton, O'Sullivan, McCarthy, O'Driscoll, Strom

Second semi-final
Saturday, 16 November (7:30 pm)	Hawthorn 6.13 (49)	def. by	Port Adelaide 7.8 (50)	Ikon Park (crowd: 3,680)	Report; Stats
2.3 (15); 3.8 (26); 5.12 (42); 6.13 (49)	Q1; Q2; Q3; Q4	1.0 (6); 3.2 (20); 3.2 (20); 7.8 (50)
Bodey 2, Ashmore, Fleming, McDonagh, Stephenson	Goals	Dowrick 2, Houghton 2, Boag, O'Dea, Scholz
West, Fleming, Bodey, Bates, Gilroy	Best	Brooksby, Goody, Houghton, Dowrick, Scholz
Port Adelaide trailed by 22 points at three-quarter time of the semi-final against Hawthorn and went on to win, recording the biggest comeback from a three-quarter time deficit in AFLW history.

=== Finals week 3 ===
First preliminary final
Saturday, 23 November (3:05 pm)	North Melbourne 12.6 (78)	def.	Port Adelaide 2.9 (21)	Ikon Park (crowd: 4,387)	Report; Stats
4.2 (26); 8.4 (52); 11.5 (71); 12.6 (78)	Q1; Q2; Q3; Q4	0.0 (0); 0.2 (2); 0.6 (6); 2.9 (21)
Wall 3, Gatt 2, O'Loughlin 2, Randall 2, Shierlaw 2, Garner	Goals	Houghton, Pope
Garner, Riddell, Gatt, Wall, Tripodi, Wright	Best	Window, Dowrick, Goody, Moloney

Second preliminary final
Saturday, 23 November (6:30 pm)	Brisbane 7.8 (50)	def.	Adelaide 4.8 (32)	Brighton Homes Arena (crowd: 4,519)	Report; Stats
0.3 (3); 2.4 (16); 6.5 (41); 7.8 (50)	Q1; Q2; Q3; Q4	1.3 (9); 3.5 (23); 3.7 (25); 4.8 (32)
Davidson 2, Dawes, Ellenger, Hampson, Hodder, C. Svarc	Goals	Randall 2, Gould, Kustermann
Grider, O'Dwyer, Anderson, C. Svarc, Hodder, Davidson, Koenen	Best	Marinoff, Randall, Biddell, Hatchard, Ponter

=== Grand final ===
Grand final
Saturday, 30 November (7:45 pm)	North Melbourne 6.3 (39)	def.	Brisbane 1.3 (9)	Ikon Park (crowd: 12,122)	Report; Stats
3.0 (18); 4.1 (25); 4.1 (25); 6.3 (39)	Q1; Q2; Q3; Q4	1.1 (7); 1.2 (8); 1.3 (9); 1.3 (9)	Best on ground: Jasmine Garner (North Melbourne); Field umpires: Matt Adams, Gabby Simmonds, Sam Whetton; National anthem: Bobby Fox
O'Loughlin 3, Wall 2, Craven	Goals	Hampson
Garner, Riddell, Kearney, Craven, Wright	Best	Dawes, Anderson, O'Dwyer, Dunne

== Win–loss table ==
For readability purposes, weeks 4 to 7 are split into each club's five matches. Home matches are in bold and opponents are listed above the margins.

+	Win		Qualified for finals
−	Loss		Eliminated
	Draw	X	Bye

Team	Home-and-away season											Ladder	Finals series			
Team	W1	W2	W3	Weeks 4–7					W8	W9	W10	Ladder	F1	F2	F3	GF
Team	W1	W2	W3	1	2	3	4	5	W8	W9	W10	Ladder	F1	F2	F3	GF
Adelaide	PA +14	FRE +33	**HAW** **+26**	**ESS** **+33**	BRI −2	**STK** **+4**	**MEL** **−2**	GWS +64	COL +43	**NM** **−8**	GEE +4	4 (8–3–0)	NM −7	**FRE** **+37**	BRI −18	
Brisbane	**NM** **−44**	MEL +18	**COL** **+52**	**WB** **+47**	WC +45	**ADE** **+2**	CAR +55	**GC** **+16**	GEE −10	**SYD** **+68**	STK +27	3 (9–2–0)	HAW +6	X	**ADE** **+18**	NM −30
Carlton	HAW −38	GC +1	**GEE** **+24**	RIC −33	**NM** **−69**	PA −35	**BRI** **−55**	FRE +4	**WB** **−33**	COL +4	**ESS** **−36**	14 (4–7–0)				
Collingwood	SYD −15	**HAW** **−47**	BRI −52	**WC** **−17**	**WB** **−42**	**GC** **+3**	RIC −36	PA −8	**ADE** **−43**	**CAR** **−4**	MEL −47	18 (1–10–0)				
Essendon	**FRE** **−43**	WC +16	**STK** **−8**	ADE −33	**MEL** **+65**	**SYD** **+3**	GC +9	WB +23	**NM** **−51**	**RIC**; **0**	CAR +36	8 (6–4–1)	FRE −10			
Fremantle	ESS +43	**ADE** **−33**	PA +8	**MEL** **+6**	STK +11	GEE +18	**HAW** **−9**	**CAR** **−4**	WC +23	GWS +30	**WB** **+14**	5 (8–3–0)	**ESS** **+10**	ADE −37		
Geelong	**MEL** **−2**	NM; 0	CAR −24	GC +69	**HAW** **−18**	**FRE** **−18**	SYD +3	RIC −7	**BRI** **+10**	WC +33	**ADE** **−4**	10 (4–6–1)				
Gold Coast	**STK** **−54**	**CAR** **−1**	GWS; 0	**GEE** **−69**	COL −3	HAW −13	**ESS** **−9**	BRI −16	SYD +4	**PA** **−34**	NM −63	17 (1–9–1)				
Greater Western Sydney	**WB** **+63**	RIC −11	**GC**; **0**	SYD −3	**WC** **−24**	MEL −16	STK −34	**ADE** **−64**	HAW −37	**FRE** **−30**	PA −1	16 (1–9–1)				
Hawthorn	**CAR** **+38**	COL +47	ADE −26	STK +57	GEE +18	**GC** **+13**	FRE +9	**WC** **+66**	**GWS** **+37**	**MEL** **+6**	RIC +23	2 (10–1–0)	**BRI** **−6**	**PA** **−1**		
Melbourne	GEE +2	**BRI** **−18**	**NM** **−50**	FRE −6	ESS −65	**GWS** **+16**	ADE +2	STK +14	**RIC** **+13**	HAW −6	**COL** **+47**	9 (6–5–0)				
North Melbourne	BRI +44	**GEE**; **0**	MEL +50	**PA** **+36**	CAR +69	**RIC** **+12**	**WB** **+55**	**SYD** **+60**	ESS +51	ADE +8	**GC** **+63**	1 (10–0–1)	**ADE** **+7**	X	**PA** **+57**	**BRI** **+30**
Port Adelaide	**ADE** **−14**	WB +40	**FRE** **−8**	NM −36	RIC −21	**CAR** **+35**	WC +13	**COL** **+8**	**STK** **+15**	GC +34	**GWS** **+1**	6 (7–4–0)	**RIC** **+24**	HAW +1	NM −57	
Richmond	WC −1	**GWS** **+11**	SYD +46	**CAR** **+33**	**PA** **+21**	NM −12	**COL** **+36**	**GEE** **+7**	MEL −13	ESS; 0	**HAW** **−23**	7 (6–4–1)	PA −24			
St Kilda	GC +54	**SYD** **+16**	ESS +8	**HAW** **−57**	**FRE** **−11**	ADE −4	**GWS** **+34**	**MEL** **−14**	PA −15	WB −1	**BRI** **−27**	11 (4–7–0)				
Sydney	**COL** **+15**	STK −16	**RIC** **−46**	**GWS** **+3**	WB −7	ESS −3	**GEE** **−3**	NM −60	**GC** **−4**	BRI −68	**WC** **+46**	15 (3–8–0)				
West Coast	**RIC** **+1**	**ESS** **−16**	WB +11	COL +17	**BRI** **−45**	GWS +24	**PA** **−13**	HAW −66	**FRE** **−23**	**GEE** **−33**	SYD −46	13 (4–7–0)				
Western Bulldogs	GWS −63	**PA** **−40**	**WC** **−11**	BRI −47	COL +42	**SYD** **+7**	NM −55	**ESS** **−23**	CAR +33	**STK** **+1**	FRE −14	12 (4–7–0)				

Source: Australian Football

== Season notes ==
- The Western Bulldogs became the first team to be held goalless three times in an AFLW season.
- North Melbourne became the first team to go through an AFLW season undefeated. They had a record score differential of 315.4% and conceded an average of just 19 points per game.

== Coach departures ==
Outgoing coach	Club	Manner of departure	Date of departure	Caretaker coach	Incoming coach	Date of appointment
Cameron Joyce	Gold Coast	Dismissed with two years remaining on contract	2 December 2024	—	Rhyce Shaw	21 January 2025

== Awards ==
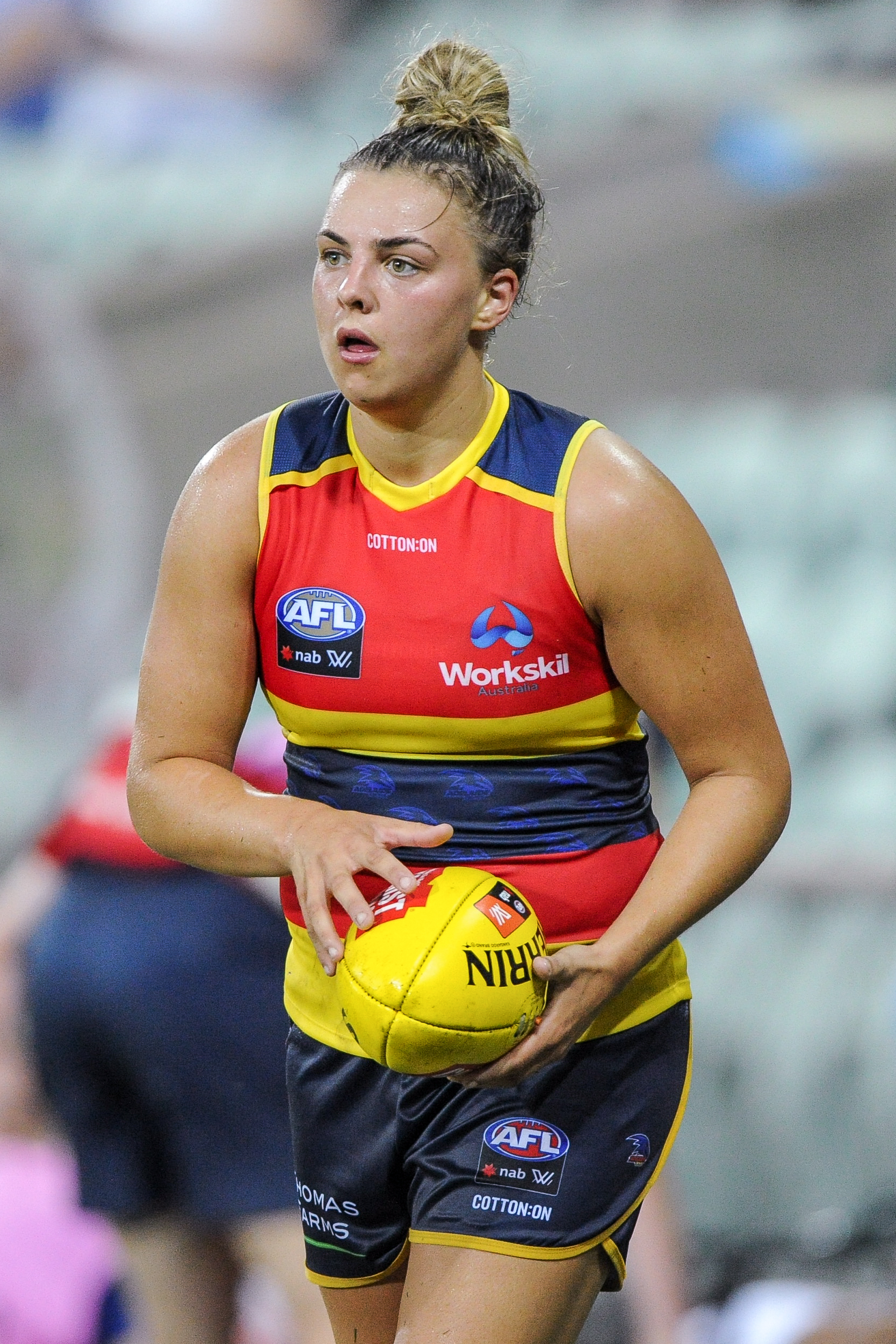
Adelaide co-captain Ebony Marinoff, league best and fairest winner, AFLPA most valuable player and best captain, and AFLCA champion player of the year

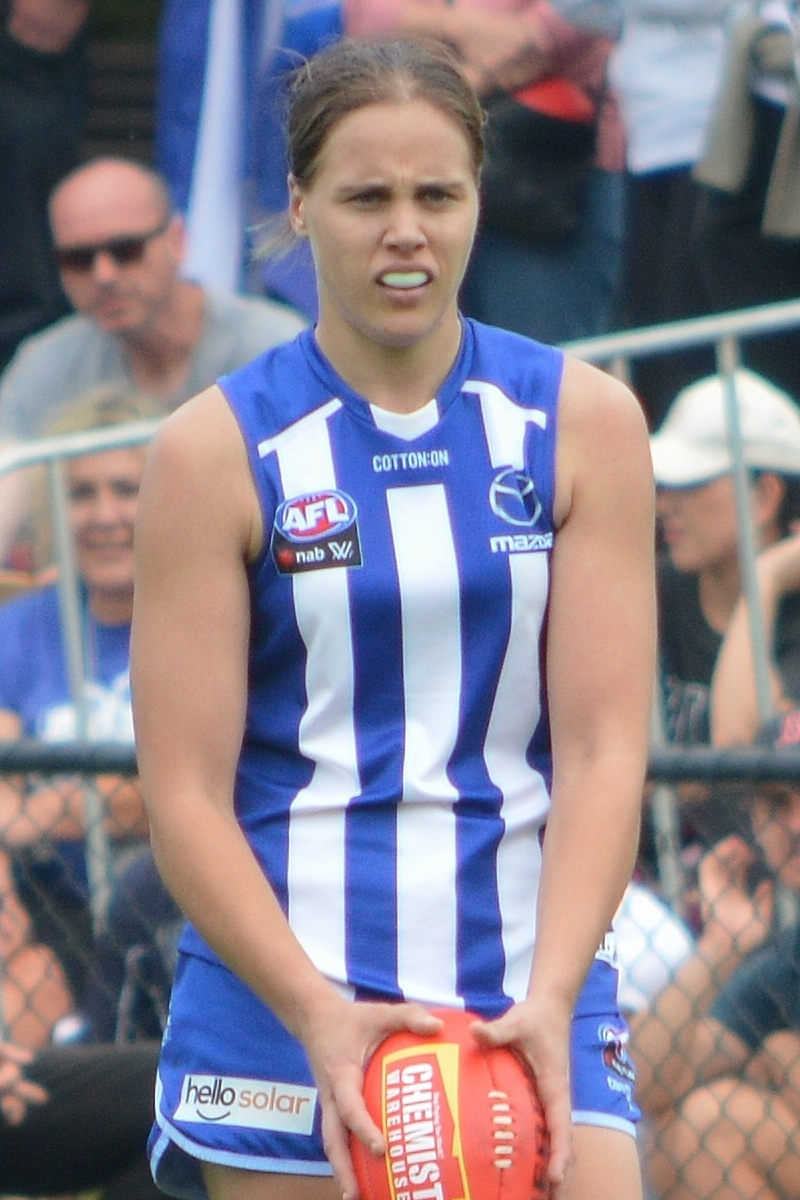
North Melbourne's Jasmine Garner, grand final best-on-ground and All-Australian captain

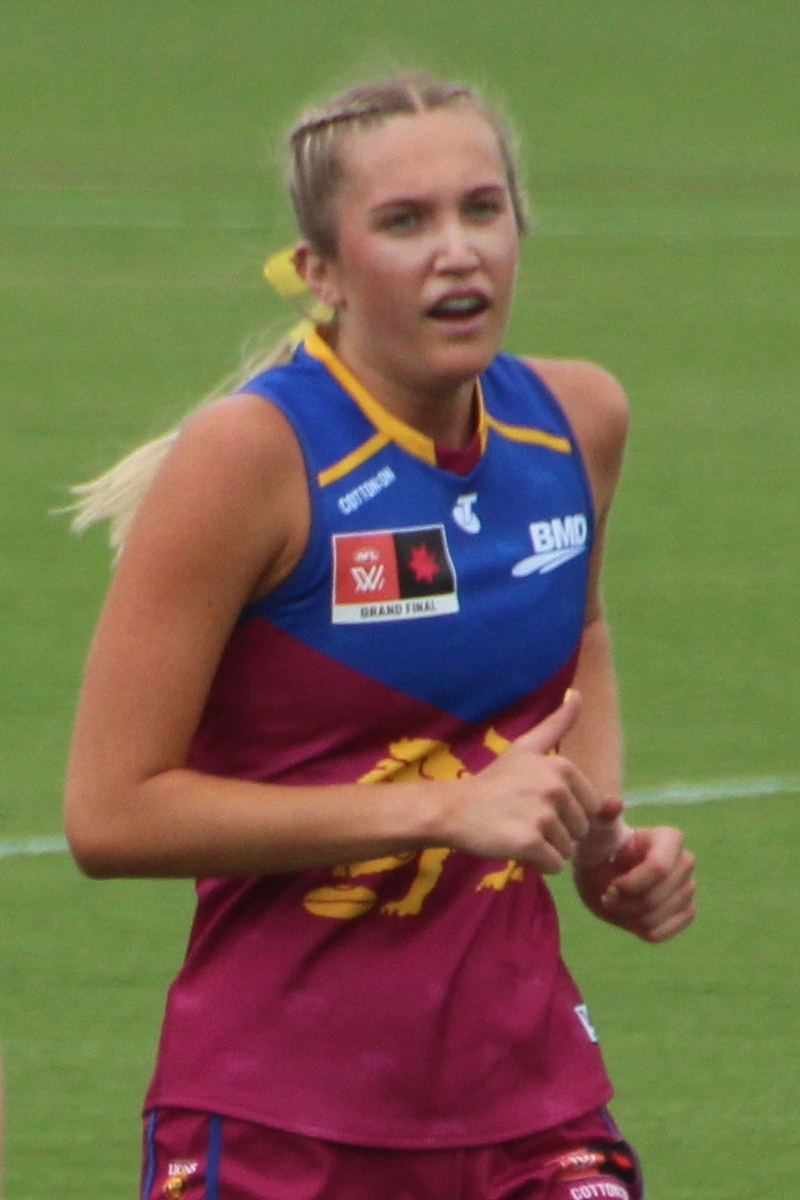
Brisbane's Taylor Smith, equal leading goalkicker

=== Major awards ===
- The AFL Women's best and fairest was awarded to Adelaide co-captain Ebony Marinoff.
- The AFLPA AFLW most valuable player was awarded to Adelaide co-captain Ebony Marinoff; Marinoff was also voted as best captain, while teammate Chelsea Randall was voted as most courageous player and Port Adelaide's Shineah Goody was voted as best first-year player.
- The AFLCA AFLW champion player of the year was awarded to Adelaide co-captain Ebony Marinoff; North Melbourne coach Darren Crocker was voted as coach of the year.
- The AFL Women's Grand Final best-on-ground medal was awarded to North Melbourne's Jasmine Garner.
- The AFL Women's All-Australian team was announced on 25 November; North Melbourne's Jasmine Garner was named captain and Adelaide co-captain Ebony Marinoff was named vice-captain.
- The AFL Women's leading goalkicker was awarded to Geelong's Aishling Moloney and Brisbane's Taylor Smith.
- The AFL Women's Rising Star was awarded to Port Adelaide's Matilda Scholz.
- The Goal of the Year was awarded to Adelaide's Hannah Munyard.
- The Mark of the Year was awarded to Port Adelaide's Matilda Scholz.

=== Leading goalkickers ===
For readability purposes, weeks 4 to 7 are split into each club's five matches.

1	Led the goalkicking at the end of the round
1	Led the goalkicking at the end of the home-and-away season
1_{1}	Subscript indicates the player's goal tally to that point of the season
–	Did not play during that round
X	Had a bye during that round

#	Player	Team	Home-and-away season (AFL Women's leading goalkicker)											Finals series				Total	Games	Average
#	Player	Team	W1	W2	W3	Weeks 4–7					W8	W9	W10	F1	F2	F3	GF	Total	Games	Average
#	Player	Team	W1	W2	W3	1	2	3	4	5	W8	W9	W10	F1	F2	F3	GF	Total	Games	Average
1	Taylor Smith	Brisbane	1_{1}	1_{2}	3_{5}	4_{9}	2_{11}	2_{13}	1_{14}	2_{16}	0_{16}	3_{19}	2_{21}	1_{22}	X_{22}	0_{22}	0_{22}	22	14	1.57
2	Aishling Moloney	Geelong	0_{0}	2_{2}	0_{2}	4_{6}	3_{9}	1_{10}	2_{12}	1_{13}	2_{15}	6_{21}	0_{21}					21	11	1.91
3	Caitlin Gould	Adelaide	–_{0}	0_{0}	2_{2}	2_{4}	2_{6}	1_{7}	0_{7}	3_{10}	3_{13}	1_{14}	3_{17}	2_{19}	0_{19}	1_{20}		20	13	1.54
4	Alice O'Loughlin	North Melbourne	2_{2}	–_{2}	2_{4}	2_{6}	0_{6}	1_{7}	0_{7}	3_{10}	0_{10}	0_{10}	4_{14}	0_{14}	X_{14}	2_{16}	3_{19}	19	13	1.46
5	Kate Shierlaw	North Melbourne	1_{1}	1_{2}	5_{7}	1_{8}	–_{8}	0_{8}	–_{8}	1_{9}	3_{12}	2_{14}	1_{15}	1_{16}	X_{16}	2_{18}	0_{18}	18	12	1.50
6	Gemma Houghton	Port Adelaide	1_{1}	1_{2}	0_{2}	0_{2}	2_{4}	2_{6}	2_{8}	1_{9}	0_{9}	2_{11}	1_{12}	2_{14}	2_{16}	1_{17}		17	14	1.21
7	Aine McDonagh	Hawthorn	2_{2}	2_{4}	1_{5}	2_{7}	2_{9}	1_{10}	0_{10}	1_{11}	0_{11}	1_{12}	2_{14}	1_{15}	1_{16}			16	13	1.23
7	Danielle Ponter	Adelaide	0_{0}	1_{1}	5_{6}	2_{8}	0_{8}	0_{8}	0_{8}	3_{11}	0_{11}	3_{14}	0_{14}	1_{15}	1_{16}	0_{16}		16	14	1.14
9	Tahlia Randall	North Melbourne	1_{1}	1_{2}	0_{2}	0_{2}	3_{5}	0_{5}	1_{6}	2_{8}	2_{10}	0_{10}	2_{12}	1_{13}	X_{13}	2_{15}	0_{15}	15	14	1.07
Other end-of-week leaders
	Zarlie Goldsworthy	Greater Western Sydney	4_{4}	1_{5}	1_{6}	2_{8}	1_{9}	1_{10}	0_{10}	2_{12}	0_{12}	0_{12}	1_{13}					13	11	1.18
	Julia Teakle	Port Adelaide	1_{1}	4_{5}	2_{7}	1_{8}	0_{8}	1_{9}	0_{9}	0_{9}	–_{9}	–_{9}	–_{9}	2_{11}	0_{11}	0_{11}		11	11	1.00

Source: Australian Football

=== Club best and fairest ===
Player(s)	Club	Award	Ref.
Ebony Marinoff	Adelaide	Club Champion	
Ally Anderson	Brisbane	Best and fairest	
Keeley Sherar	Carlton	Best and fairest	
Ruby Schleicher	Collingwood	Best and fairest	
Maddi Gay	Essendon	Best and fairest	
Mim Strom	Fremantle	Fairest and best	
Nina Morrison	Geelong	Best and fairest	
Charlie Rowbottom	Gold Coast	Club Champion	
Rebecca Beeson	Greater Western Sydney	Gabrielle Trainor Medal	
Eliza West	Hawthorn	Best and fairest	
Kate Hore	Melbourne	Daisy Pearce Trophy	
Jasmine Garner	North Melbourne	Best and fairest	
Matilda Scholz	Port Adelaide	Best and fairest	
Monique Conti	Richmond	Best and fairest	
Jaimee Lambert	St Kilda	Best and fairest	
Sofia Hurley	Sydney	Club Champion	
Ella Roberts	West Coast	Club Champion	
Isabelle Pritchard	Western Bulldogs	Best and fairest	

== Player movement and draft ==
The player movement period ran from November 2024 to March 2025, including the 2024 AFL Women's draft, the competition's first fully national draft, which was held on 16 December 2024.

== See also ==
- 2024 AFL season

== Sources ==
- 2024 AFL Women's season at afl.com.au
- 2024 AFL Women's season at Australian Football
- 2024 AFL Women's season at Austadiums
