= AFL Women's leading goalkicker =

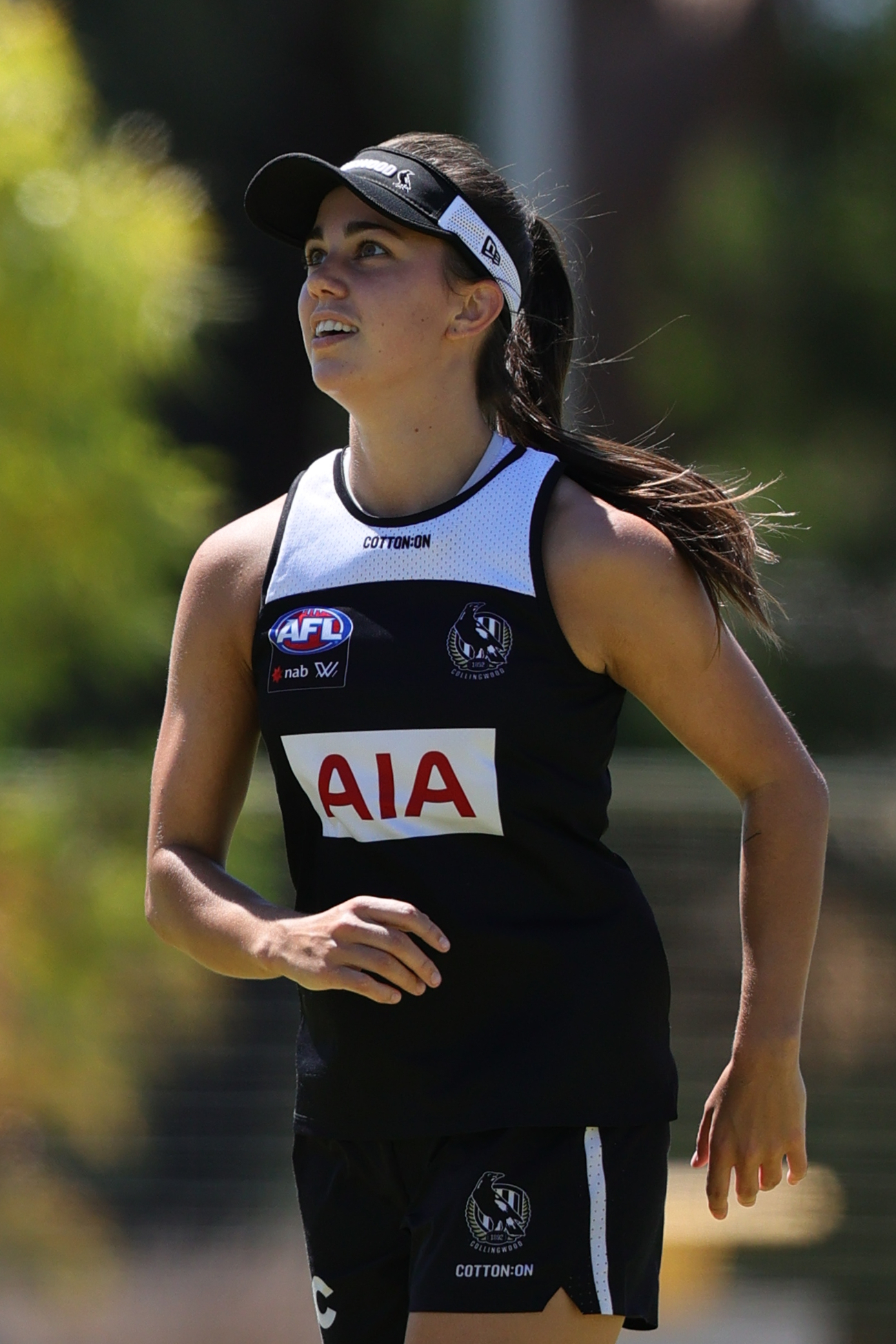
- Chloe Molloy, 2026 winner
- Awarded for: Player with most goals during the AFL Women's home-and-away season
- Country: Australia
- Presented by: AFL Women's
- First award: 2017
- Currently held by: Chloe Molloy

Highlights
- Most awards: Darcy Vescio (2)

The AFL Women's leading goalkicker award is presented annually to the AFL Women's (AFLW) player who kicks the most goals during the home-and-away season.

== Winners ==
Table of recipients
| Season | Recipient(s) | Club | Goals | | | Games | Ref. |
| Season | Recipient(s) | Club | H&A | Finals | Total | Games | Ref. |
|---|---|---|---|---|---|---|---|
| 2017 | Darcy Vescio | Carlton | 14 | — | 14 | 7 | |
| 2018 | Brooke Lochland | Western Bulldogs | 12 | 0 | 12 | 8 | |
| 2019 | Stevie-Lee Thompson | Adelaide | 13 | 1 | 14 | 9 | |
| 2020 | Caitlin Greiser | St Kilda | 10 | — | 10 | 6 | |
| 2021 | Darcy Vescio (2) | Carlton | 16 | — | 16 | 9 | |
| 2022 (S6) | Ashleigh Woodland | Adelaide | 19 | 2 | 21 | 12 | |
| 2022 (S7) | Jesse Tawhiao-Wardlaw | Brisbane | 19 | 3 | 22 | 12 | |
| 2023 | Kate Hore | Melbourne | 20 | 0 | 20 | 12 | |
| 2023 | Eden Zanker | Melbourne | 20 | 3 | 23 | 12 | |
| 2024 | Aishling Moloney | Geelong | 21 | — | 21 | 11 | |
| 2024 | Taylor Smith | Brisbane | 21 | 1 | 22 | 14 | |
| 2025 | Indy Tahau | Port Adelaide | 25 | — | 25 | 12 | |
| 2026 | Chloe Molloy | Sydney | 28* | TBD | | | |

* Tally holds all-time goal kicking record

Table of clubs' totals
| Club | Total | Seasons |
|---|---|---|
| Adelaide | 2 | 2019, S6 |
| Brisbane | 2 | S7, 2024 |
| Carlton | 2 | 2017, 2021 |
| Melbourne | 2 | 2023 (Note: Two Melbourne players won the award in 2023.) |
| Geelong | 1 | 2024 |
| Port Adelaide | 1 | 2025 |
| St Kilda | 1 | 2020 |
| Sydney | 1 | 2026 |
| Western Bulldogs | 1 | 2018 |
| Collingwood | 0 | — |
| Essendon | 0 | — |
| Fremantle | 0 | — |
| Gold Coast | 0 | — |
| Greater Western Sydney | 0 | — |
| Hawthorn | 0 | — |
| North Melbourne | 0 | — |
| Richmond | 0 | — |
| West Coast | 0 | — |

== See also ==
- Coleman Medal
