= Aisling McCarthy =

Personal information
- Born: 24 February 1996 (age 30)
- Draft: No. 23, 2018 national draft
- Debut: Round 2, 2019, Western Bulldogs vs. Geelong, at Whitten Oval
- Height: 172 cm (5 ft 8 in)
- Position: Forward/midfielder

Club information
- Current club: Fremantle
- Number: 7

Playing career^{1}
Years	Club	Games (Goals)
2019–2020	Western Bulldogs	12 (7)
2021–2023	West Coast	31 (10)
2024–	Fremantle	34 (19)
Total		77 (36)

International team honours^{2}
Years	Team	Games (Goals)
2026	Ireland	1 (0)
- ^{1} Playing statistics correct to the end of the 2026 season.^{2} Representative statistics correct as of 2026.

Career highlights
- AFL Women's All-Australian Team: 2024; Fremantle leading goalkicker: 2024; Fremantle fairest and best: 2025

Aisling Louise McCarthy (born 24 February 1996) is an Irish Australian rules footballer playing for Fremantle in the AFL Women's (AFLW), having previously played for the Western Bulldogs and the West Coast Eagles. She became an Australian citizen in July 2022.

== Early life ==
From Cahir, County Tipperary in Ireland, McCarthy began playing Gaelic football from the age of seven. She also played camogie, captaining her club Cahir to victory in the 2016 All-Ireland intermediate finals. In 2017, she was the player of the match in Tipperary's victory in the All-Ireland Intermediate Ladies' Football Championship, scoring one goal and four points. She was also named the TG4 Intermediate Player's Player of the Year.

McCarthy's interest in Australian football began in 2015 when Colin O'Riordan, a Tipperary footballer, moved to the Sydney Swans. In September 2018, she was among 18 international prospects to attend the CrossCoders program, a week-long Australian football camp held in Melbourne.

== AFLW career ==
McCarthy was drafted by the Western Bulldogs with pick 23 in the 2018 AFLW national draft. She debuted in round 2 of the 2019 season against Geelong at Whitten Oval, kicking her first goal in the third quarter. At the season's conclusion, she re-signed with the Bulldogs for the 2020 season; she played six matches and kicked five goals in her first year. After a second year with the Bulldogs playing more as a midfielder and kicking two goals from six games, she finished 4th in the Bulldogs Best and Fairest. She and the Bulldogs' 3rd pick in the 2020 AFL Women's draft were traded to West Coast in exchange for picks 2 and 16. She came second in the West Coast best and fairest voting in 2021, with 37 votes, three behind first-placed Isabella Lewis. She signed a two-year contract with the Eagles on 26 June 2021, keeping her with the team until the end of the 2023 season.

Following the 2023 AFL Women's season, McCarthy was traded to the Fremantle Football Club. Round four of the 2024 AFL Women's season saw McCarthy kick a goal after the siren to win the match against the Melbourne Demons at Fremantle Oval. She finished her first season at the Dockers as their leading goalkicker, having kicked eight goals across twelve games. She was selected for a spot in the 2024 AFL Women's All-Australian team and also finished runner-up in Fremantle's fairest and best award.

The 2025 AFL Women's season saw McCarthy play all 12 games as a midfielder/forward. She kicked 8 goals for the season, the same return as her previous year, to finish second in the club leading goalkicker award only behind Hayley Miller. After previously finishing runner-up club champion on three separate occasions across two different clubs, McCarthy was awarded the Fremantle fairest and best award in November at their annual awards night, polling 221 votes, 6 ahead of Gabby Newton in second place.

== Statistics ==
Updated to the end of the 2025 season.

Legend
G	Goals	K	Kicks	D	Disposals	T	Tackles
B	Behinds	H	Handballs	M	Marks

Season	Team	No.	Games	Totals							Averages (per game)							Votes
Season	Team	No.	Games	G	B	K	H	D	M	T	G	B	K	H	D	M	T	Votes
2019	Western Bulldogs	15	6	5	1	41	20	61	11	15	0.8	0.2	6.8	3.3	10.2	1.8	2.5	0
2020	Western Bulldogs	15	6	2	3	57	24	81	20	24	0.3	0.5	9.5	4.0	13.5	3.3	4.0	0
2021	West Coast	11	7	2	2	69	30	99	10	32	0.3	0.3	9.9	4.3	14.1	1.4	4.6	3
2022(S6)	West Coast	11	4	1	0	21	20	41	5	10	0.2	0.0	11.8	3.2	15	1.9	5.3	1
2022(S7)	West Coast	11	10	3	4	118	32	150	19	53	0.3	0.4	5.3	5.0	10.3	1.3	2.5	3
2023	West Coast	11	10	4	6	112	46	158	16	53	0.4	0.6	11.2	4.6	15.8	1.6	5.3	1
2024	Fremantle	7	12	8	6	184	77	261	31	98	0.7	0.5	15.3	6.4	21.8	2.6	8.2	10
2025	Fremantle	7	12	8	7	191	101	292	33	57	0.7	0.6	15.9	8.4	24.3	8.4	4.8	5
Career			67	33	29	793	350	1143	145	342	0.5	0.4	11.8	5.2	17.1	2.2	5.1	23
