= Taylor Smith (Australian footballer) =

Australian rules footballer

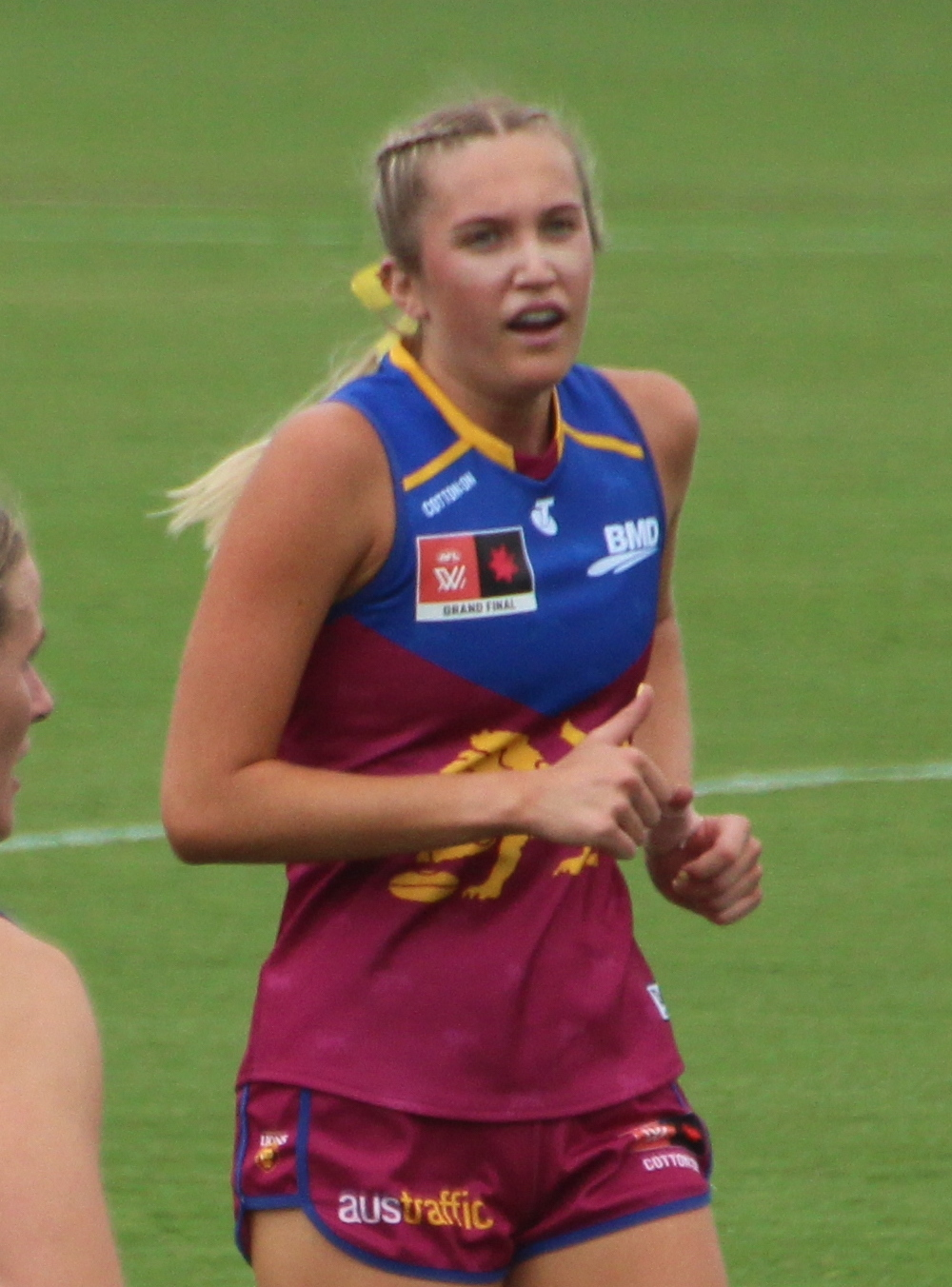
- Smith playing for Brisbane in the 2022 season 7 Grand Final

Personal information
- Born: 13 February 2000 (age 26)
- Original team: Bond University (QAFLW)
- Draft: 2019 Priority Signing, Gold Coast
- Height: 180 cm (5 ft 11 in)
- Position: Forward / Ruck

Club information
- Current club: Sydney

Playing career^{1}
Years	Club	Games (Goals)
2020	Gold Coast	1 (0)
2021–2025	Brisbane	76 (67)
2026–	Sydney	0 (0)
Total		77 (67)
- ^{1} Playing statistics correct to the end of the 2025 season.

Career highlights
- AFL Women's leading goalkicker: 2024; AFL Women's All-Australian Team: 2024; AFLW premiership player: 2021, 2023

Taylor Smith (born 13 February 2000) is an Australian rules footballer who plays for Sydney in the AFL Women's competition (AFLW). She previously played for Gold Coast and Brisbane. She won two premierships with the Lions in 2021 and 2023, and was the AFL Women's leading goalkicker in 2024.

== Early life ==
Smith grew up on the Gold Coast and attended Coomera Anglican College throughout her upbringing. Her first sporting interest came at the age of 10 in the form of athletics where she predominantly focused on high jump and hurdles. She transitioned to heptathlon at the age of 16 and began competing at the national level in just her fourth ever event in the sport. Towards the end of Year 12, she played Australian rules football for the first time in the local APS inter-school competition and was spotted by an AFL Queensland scout who organised a trial with the Gold Coast Suns Academy. She began playing club football for the first time in 2018 for Bond University in the QAFLW.

Less than two years after playing football for the first time, Smith was announced as a priority signing for the Gold Coast Suns' inaugural AFLW list.

== AFLW career ==
=== Gold Coast ===
Smith made her AFLW debut for Gold Coast in round 6 of the 2020 AFL Women's season.

=== Brisbane ===
In August 2020, Smith was traded to Brisbane, along with a couple of picks, for the 24th pick of the 2020 AFL Women's draft.

Smith had a strong first season with the Lions in which she played every game. She had her best game for the season in round 3, in the Lions' 45 point win over West Coast. in that game, she tallied a career-high 3 goals, 11 disposals and 8 hitouts, securing her 2 best and fairest votes. Smith became a premiership player in the club's 2021 AFL Women's Grand Final winning side. Smith signed on with Brisbane for one more year on 15 June 2021.

She won a second premiership in 2023, before kicking 21 goals to share the AFL Women's leading goalkicker award with Aishling Moloney in 2024.

=== Sydney ===
At the end of the 2025 season, Smith was traded to Sydney in a three-club deal that also included Hawthorn.

=== Statistics ===
Statistics are correct to the end of the 2025 season.

Legend
G	Goals	K	Kicks	D	Disposals	T	Tackles
B	Behinds	H	Handballs	M	Marks	H/O	Hit-outs
#	Played in that season's premiership team	†	Led the league for the season

Season	Team	No.	Games	Totals								Averages (per game)								Votes
Season	Team	No.	Games	G	B	K	H	D	M	T	H/O	G	B	K	H	D	M	T	H/O	Votes
2020	Gold Coast	13	1	0	0	3	7	10	1	1	4	0.0	0.0	3.0	7.0	10.0	1.0	1.0	4.0	0
2021^{#}	Brisbane	31	11	5	5	37	18	55	17	18	57	0.5	0.5	3.4	1.6	5.0	1.5	1.6	5.2	2
2022 (S6)	Brisbane	31	11	7	2	52	22	74	26	21	37	0.6	0.2	4.7	2.0	6.7	2.4	1.9	3.4	0
2022 (S7)	Brisbane	31	13	6	4	43	18	61	18	21	65	0.5	0.3	3.3	1.4	4.7	1.4	1.6	5.0	0
2023^{#}	Brisbane	31	12	9	4	56	20	76	26	24	57	0.8	0.3	4.7	1.7	6.3	2.2	2.0	4.8	0
2024	Brisbane	31	14	22^{†}	11	75	25	100	26	25	36	1.6	0.8	5.4	1.8	7.1	1.9	1.8	2.6	9
2025	Brisbane	31	15	18	11	87	39	126	37	29	33	1.2	0.7	5.8	2.6	8.4	2.5	1.9	2.2	1
Career			77	67	37	353	149	502	151	139	289	0.9	0.5	4.6	1.9	6.5	2.0	1.8	3.8	12
