= Brenna Tarrant =

Female Australian rules footballer

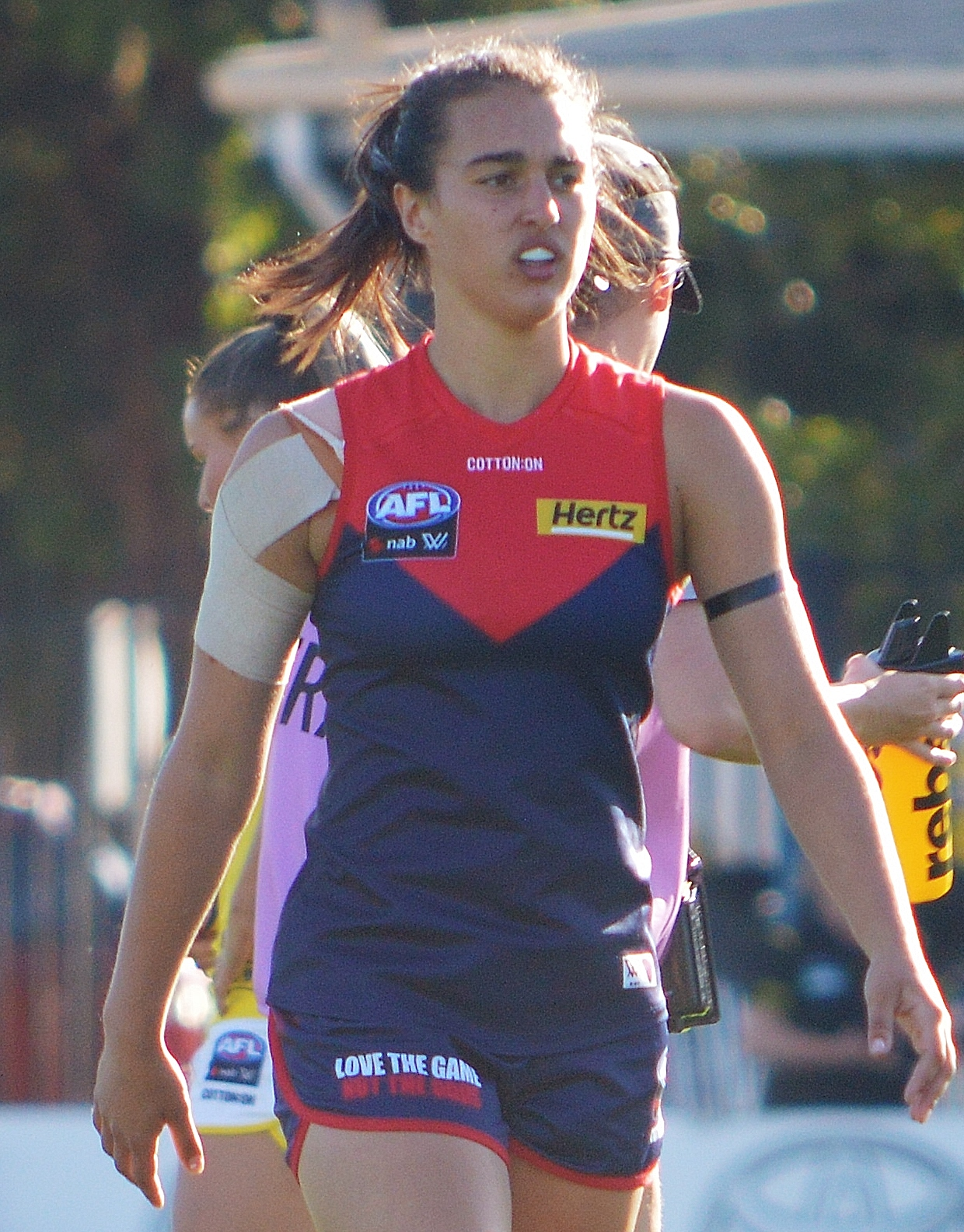
- Tarrant in February 2021

Personal information
- Full name: Brenna Tarrant
- Born: 3 November 2001 (age 25)
- Original team: East Coast Eagles (Sydney AFL)
- Draft: No. 72, 2019 national draft
- Debut: Round 5, 2020, Melbourne vs. West Coast, at Casey Fields
- Height: 174 cm (5 ft 9 in)
- Position: Utility

Club information
- Current club: Sydney
- Number: 20

Playing career^{1}
Years	Club	Games (Goals)
2020–2022	Melbourne	15 (1)
S7 (2022)–	Sydney	22 (0)
Total		37 (1)
- ^{1} Playing statistics correct to the end of the 2023 season.

Career highlights
- AFL Women's All-Australian Team: 2024

Brenna Tarrant (born 3 November 2001) is an Australian rules footballer who plays for Sydney in the AFL Women's (AFLW). She has previously played for Melbourne.

== Early life ==
Tarrant was raised in Blaxland, New South Wales in the Blue Mountains west of Sydney. Tarrant grew up supporting the Sydney Swans from a very young age and was schooled at St Columba's Catholic College.

Tarrant's junior football began at the Emu Plains/Glenmore Lions and Kellyville/Rouse Hill Magpies she joined the East Coast Eagles Premier Division senior side in 2018 contesting a Grand Final in 2019. She was still at school when she was recruited to the AFLW, moving to Melbourne following her graduation.

== AFLW career ==
In October 2019, Tarrant joined Melbourne.

She made her AFLW debut in Round 5, 2020 against the West Coast Eagles at Casey Fields playing 3 games before the COVID-19 pandemic ended competition for the year.

In May 2022, Tarrant joined expansion club Sydney.
