= Caitlin Gould =

Australian rules footballer

Personal information
- Full name: Caitlin Jean Gould
- Born: 19 July 1999 (age 27)
- Original team: Glenelg (SANFLW)
- Draft: No. 68, 2019 national draft
- Debut: Round 2, 2020, Adelaide vs. St Kilda, at Richmond Oval
- Height: 181 cm (5 ft 11 in)
- Position: Forward

Club information
- Current club: Adelaide
- Number: 1

Playing career^{1}
Years	Club	Games (Goals)
2020–	Adelaide	82 (74)
- ^{1} Playing statistics correct to the end of 2026.

Career highlights
- AFL Women's premiership player: 2022 (S6); AFL Women's All-Australian team: 2024; 2× Adelaide leading goalkicker: 2024, 2026

Caitlin Jean Gould (born 19 July 1999) is an Australian rules footballer who plays for Adelaide in the AFL Women's (AFLW).

== Early career ==
Gould attended Brighton Secondary School in Adelaide, South Australia. She played state-level volleyball in her youth, playing both beach and indoor volleyball. She was offered a scholarship to play volleyball in the United States, but rejected it, because she was still in high school. During her first game of Australian rules football at school, she broke her coccyx bone.

After just one season in the SANFL Women's with the Glenelg Football Club, she earned a selection in the SANFLW Team of the Year, and was drafted to the AFL Women's later that year with the 68th overall pick at the age of 20.

== AFL Women's career ==
Gould made her debut for Adelaide in 2020. In 2022 season 6, Gould became a premiership player with the Crows. She was their primary ruck in the 13-point victory over Melbourne.

Gould started 2024 on the sidelines, missing the round one Showdown against the Power. Gould would return in round two, and in round three against Hawthorn played her 50th career game. Gould took 39 marks inside 50 across thirteen games in 2024. This was the most that any player had taken in a single season. She led the Crows for goals in 2024, with 20 in total, and her break-out season was rewarded with her first All-Australian selection.

In 2026, Gould played her 75th game in the round five loss to Geelong. She became her club's leading goalkicker for the second time after kicking 10 goals for the season.
