= Maddi Gay =

Australian rules footballer

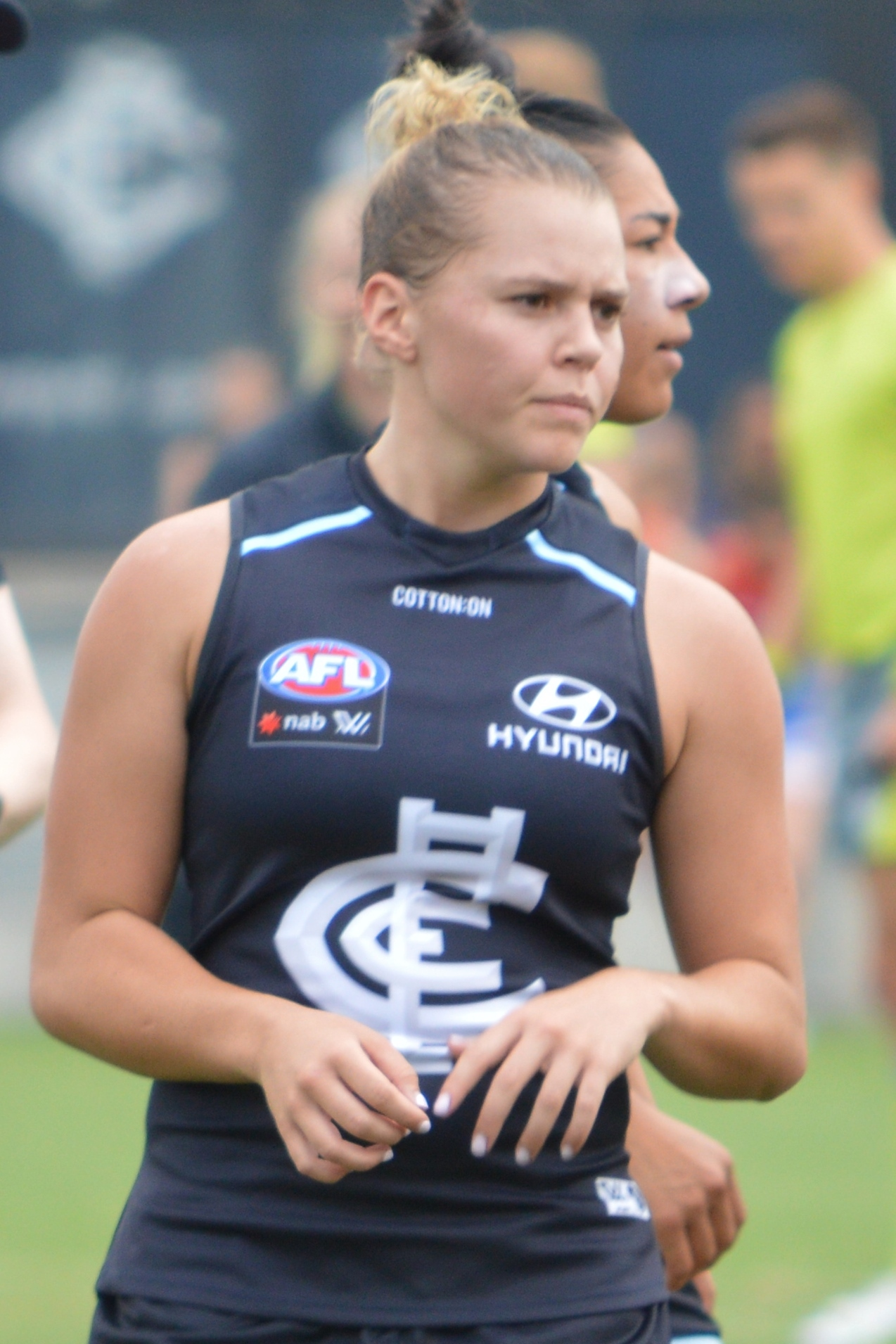
- Gay playing for Carlton in 2018

Personal information
- Full name: Maddison Gay
- Born: 28 September 1996 (age 30)
- Original team: St Kilda Sharks (VFLW)
- Draft: 2017 rookie signing
- Debut: Round 1, 2018, Carlton vs. Collingwood, at Ikon Park
- Height: 168 cm (5 ft 6 in)
- Position: Midfielder

Club information
- Current club: Essendon
- Number: 6

Playing career^{1}
Years	Club	Games (Goals)
2018	Carlton	7 (1)
2019–2023	Melbourne	47 (12)
2024–	Essendon	20 (1)
Total		74 (14)
- ^{1} Playing statistics correct to the end of the 2024 season.

Career highlights
- AFL Women's premiership player: S7; AFL Women's All-Australian team: 2024; Essendon best and fairest: 2024

Maddison Gay (born 28 September 1996) is an Australian rules footballer playing for the Essendon Football Club in the AFL Women's (AFLW). She previously played for the Carlton Football Club in 2018 and the Melbourne Football Club from 2019 to 2023. Gay won an AFL Women's premiership with Melbourne in season 7, and was named in the 2024 AFL Women's All-Australian team and won the Essendon best and fairest award in 2024.

== Early life ==
Gay grew up supporting the Essendon Football Club. Gay attended Salesian College in Sunbury and was inducted into the school's Hall of Fame in November 2025.

== AFL Women's career ==
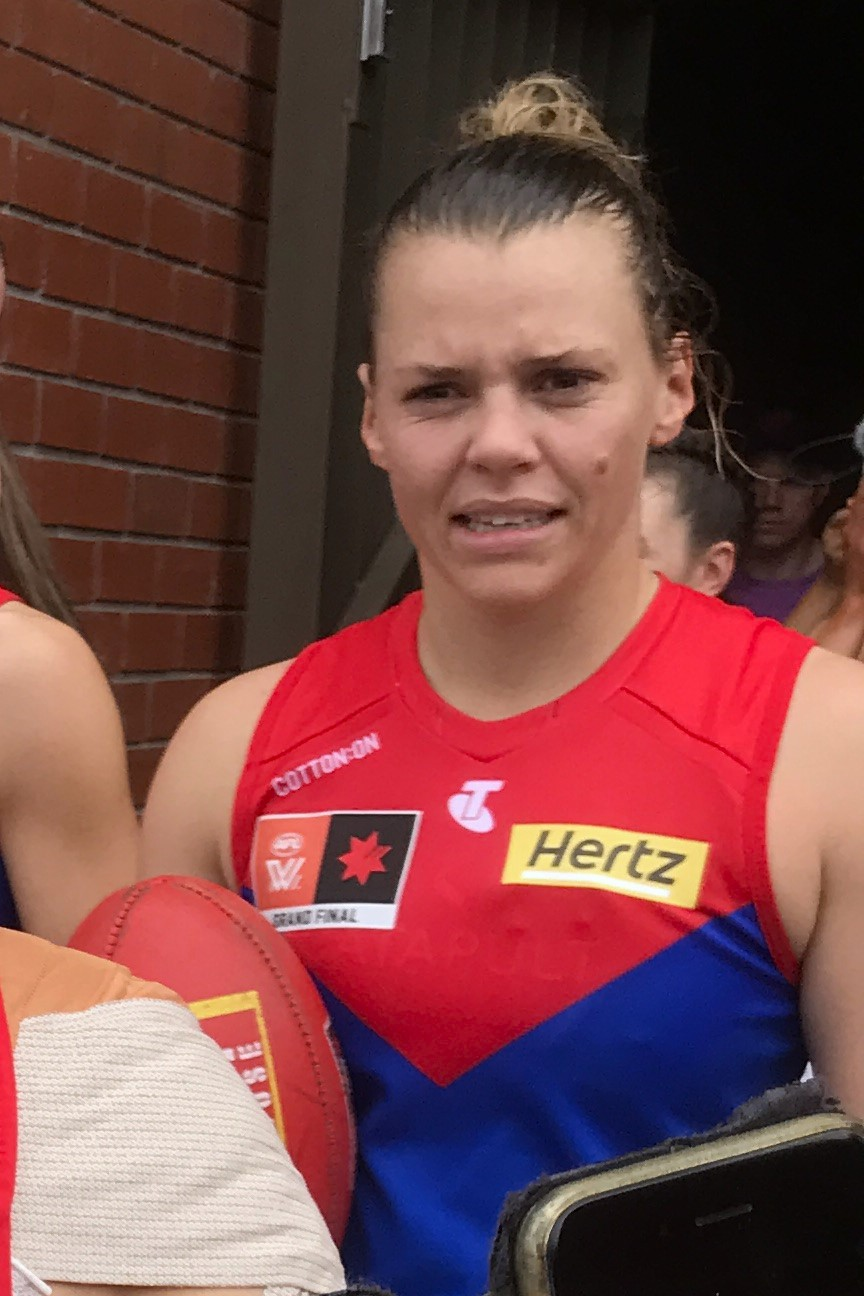
Gay entering the field prior to the 2022 AFL Women's season 7 Grand Final

=== Carlton (2018) ===
In May 2017, Gay was recruited by Carlton as a rookie signing after previously playing netball. She made her debut in the eight point win against Collingwood at Ikon Park in the opening round of the 2018 season.

=== Melbourne (2019–2023) ===
Ahead of the 2019 season, Gay was traded to Melbourne as part of a three-club deal also involving Collingwood.

=== Essendon (2024–present) ===
In December 2023, Gay was traded to Essendon as part of an unprecedented eleven-club trade.

== Statistics ==
Updated to the end of the 2024 season.

Legend
G	Goals	K	Kicks	D	Disposals	T	Tackles
B	Behinds	H	Handballs	M	Marks
#	Played in that season's premiership team

Season	Team	No.	Games	Totals							Averages (per game)							Votes
Season	Team	No.	Games	G	B	K	H	D	M	T	G	B	K	H	D	M	T	Votes
2018	Carlton	8	7	1	2	44	22	66	9	23	0.1	0.3	6.3	3.1	9.4	1.3	3.3	0
2019	Melbourne	3	7	3	6	47	41	88	10	24	0.4	0.9	6.7	5.9	12.6	1.4	3.4	1
2020	Melbourne	3	7	2	0	52	38	90	12	32	0.3	0.0	7.4	5.4	12.9	1.7	4.6	0
2021	Melbourne	3	9	2	5	95	55	150	20	45	0.2	0.6	10.6	6.1	16.7	2.2	5.0	0
2022 (S6)	Melbourne	3	7	1	2	66	15	81	20	30	0.1	0.3	9.4	2.1	11.6	2.9	4.3	0
2022 (S7)^{#}	Melbourne	3	9	0	0	92	33	125	24	25	0.0	0.0	10.2	3.7	13.9	2.7	2.8	0
2023	Melbourne	3	8	4	0	74	25	99	17	24	0.5	0.0	9.3	3.1	12.4	2.1	3.0	0
2024	Essendon	6	12	0	2	183	56	239	57	37	0.0	0.2	15.3	4.7	19.9	4.8	3.1	0
Career			66	13	17	653	285	938	169	240	0.2	0.3	9.9	4.3	14.2	2.6	3.6	1

== Honours and achievements ==
Team

- AFL Women's premiership player (Melbourne): S7
- McClelland Trophy (Melbourne): 2023

Individual

- AFL Women's All-Australian team: 2024
- Essendon best and fairest: 2024
