= Aishling Moloney =

Personal information
- Nickname: Lingy
- Born: 28 January 1998 (age 28); Cahir, Ireland
- Original team: Tipperary Ladies (GAA)
- Draft: International rookie selection
- Debut: Round 1, 2023, Geelong vs. Western Bulldogs, at GMHBA Stadium
- Height: 183 cm (6 ft 0 in)
- Position: Forward

Club information
- Current club: Geelong
- Number: 45

Playing career^{1}
Years	Club	Games (Goals)
2023–	Geelong	37 (48)

International team honours^{2}
Years	Team	Games (Goals)
2026	Ireland	1 (0)
- ^{1} Playing statistics correct to the end of Round 1, 2026.^{2} Representative statistics correct as of 2026.

Career highlights
- AFLW Leading Goalkicker: 2024; AFL Women's All-Australian team: 2024; AFLPA Best First Year Player: 2023

Aishling Moloney (born 28 January 1998) is an Irish Australian rules footballer playing for the Geelong Football Club in the AFL Women's (AFLW).

== Career ==
Originating from Cahir, County Tipperary as a gaelic footballer for Tipperary Ladies, Moloney was recruited by Geelong prior to the 2023 AFLW season.

Moloney had been previously scouted by the Brisbane Lions, but her departure to Australia was delayed due to work commitments and injury. Moloney had a knee injury in 2021 and was bitten by a spider in 2022.

Making an instant impact for Geelong, Moloney was awarded the 2023 AFL Players' Best First Year Player Award in her debut season.

During the AFL Women's offseason, Moloney returned to Ireland to play for County Tipperary.

Moloney would kick 21 goals during the 2024 AFL Women's season, to tie for the AFL Women's leading goalkicker award with Brisbane's Taylor Smith. Her season included a career-high six goals against West Coast. She would finish second in Geelong's Best and Fairest count polling 98 votes behind winner Nina Morrison.

At the 2024 AFL Women's Awards, she was selected to the 2024 AFL Women's All-Australian team in the forward line in recognition of her 2024 season, and would sign a contract extension with Geelong until the end of the 2027 season.

== Statistics ==
Updated to the end of Round 1, 2026

Legend
G	Goals	K	Kicks	D	Disposals	T	Tackles
B	Behinds	H	Handballs	M	Marks
†	Led the league for the season

Season	Team	No.	Games	Totals								Averages (per game)								Votes
Season	Team	No.	Games	G	B	K	H	D	M	T	H/O	G	B	K	H	D	M	T	H/O	Votes
2023	Geelong	45	13	10	15	98	39	137	43	19	1	0.8	1.2	7.5	3.0	10.5	3.3	1.5	0.1	3
2024	Geelong	45	11	21^{†}	11	104	52	156	32	31	5	1.9	1.0	9.5	4.7	14.2	2.9	2.8	0.5	9
2025	Geelong	45	12	17	14	123	48	171	37	27	4	1.4	1.2	10.3	4.0	14.3	3.1	2.3	0.3	6
2026	Geelong	45	1	0	2	9	2	11	0	0	1	0	2	9	2	11	0	0	1	
Career			37	48	42	334	141	475	112	77	11	1.3	1.1	9.0	3.8	12.8	3.0	2.1	0.3	12

== Honours and achievements ==
- AFLPA Best First Year Player: 2023
- AFLW Leading Goalkicker: 2024 (tied with Taylor Smith)
- AFL Women's All-Australian team: 2024
