= Gabby O'Sullivan =

Australian rules footballer (born 1994)

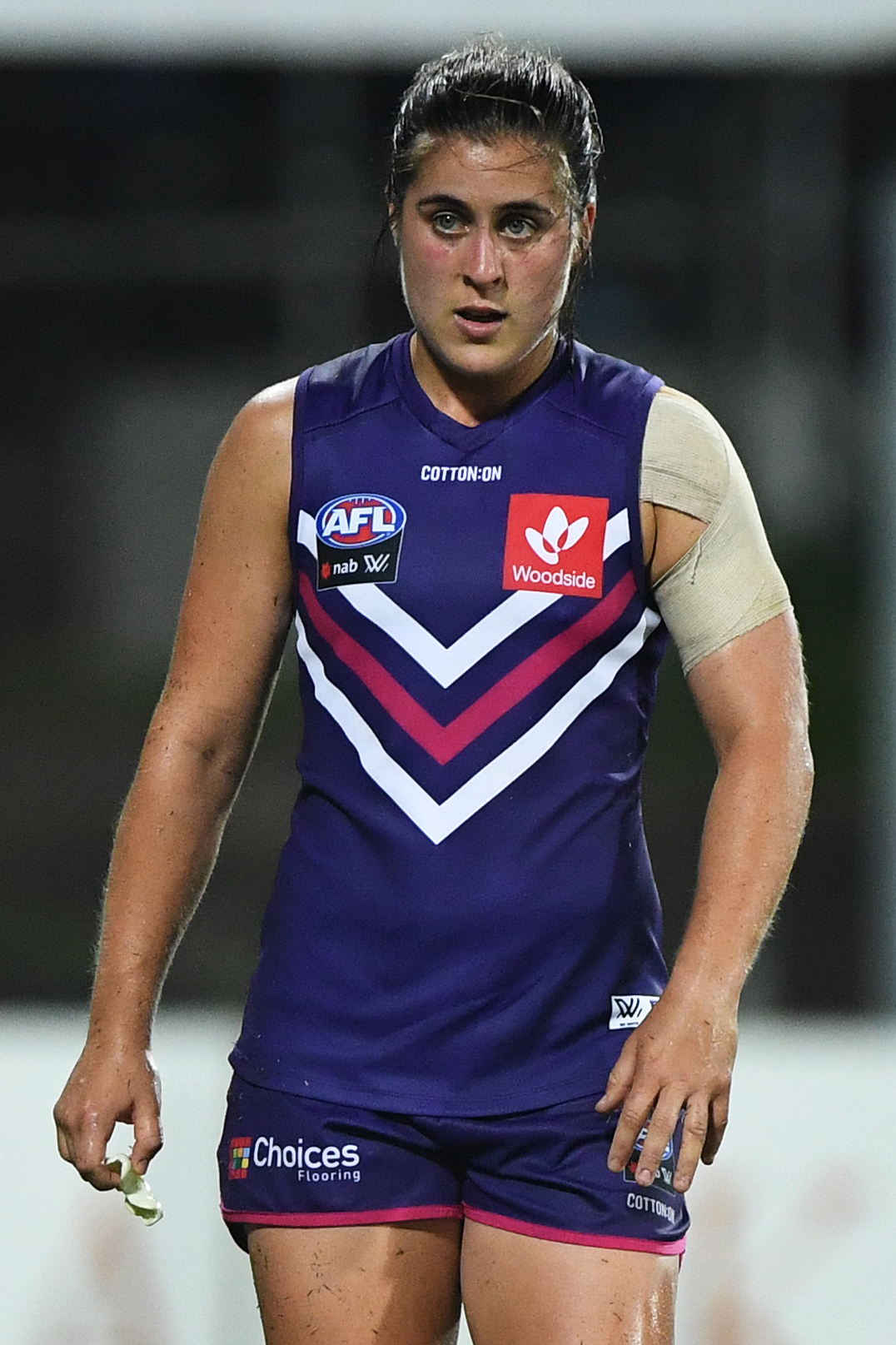
- O'Sullivan playing for Fremantle in January 2019

Personal information
- Full name: Gabrielle O'Sullivan
- Born: 21 March 1994 (age 32)
- Debut: Round 1, 2017, Fremantle vs. Western Bulldogs, at VU Whitten Oval
- Height: 167 cm (5 ft 6 in)
- Position: Forward / midfielder

Club information
- Current club: Fremantle
- Number: 9

Playing career^{1}
| Years | Club | Games (Goals) |
| 2017– | Fremantle | 97 (39) |
- ^{1} Playing statistics correct to the end of the 2026 season.

Gabrielle O'Sullivan (born 21 March 1994) is an Australian rules footballer playing for the Fremantle Football Club in the AFL Women's. She is also a former basketball player.

== Basketball career ==
O'Sullivan made her debut in the State Basketball League (SBL) in 2011 for the Perth Redbacks. In 2013, she moved to the United States to play college basketball for the College of Coastal Georgia (CCGA). She spent three seasons at CCGA, graduating in 2016. During this time, she continued to play in the SBL for the Redbacks. In 2017, she joined the Perry Lakes Hawks and won an SBL championship. Her final season in the SBL with the Hawks came in 2019.

== Football career ==
Upon returning to Australia after graduating from CCGA, O'Sullivan was intrigued by the hype surrounding women's football and was convinced by her father John to play for East Fremantle – the club he represented in league football on 133 occasions. She impressed for the Sharks, and as a result, her name made its way to Fremantle women's head coach Michelle Cowan. O'Sullivan was recruited by Fremantle as a pre-draft rookie selection, and made her debut in a thirty-two point loss to the Western Bulldogs at VU Whitten Oval in the opening round of the 2017 season. She played every match in her debut season to finish with seven matches.

In August 2022, to open the AFL Women's season seven, O'Sullivan played her 50th game for Fremantle.

== Personal life ==
O'Sullivan has an identical twin sister.
