= Sarah Wright (footballer) =

Australian rules footballer

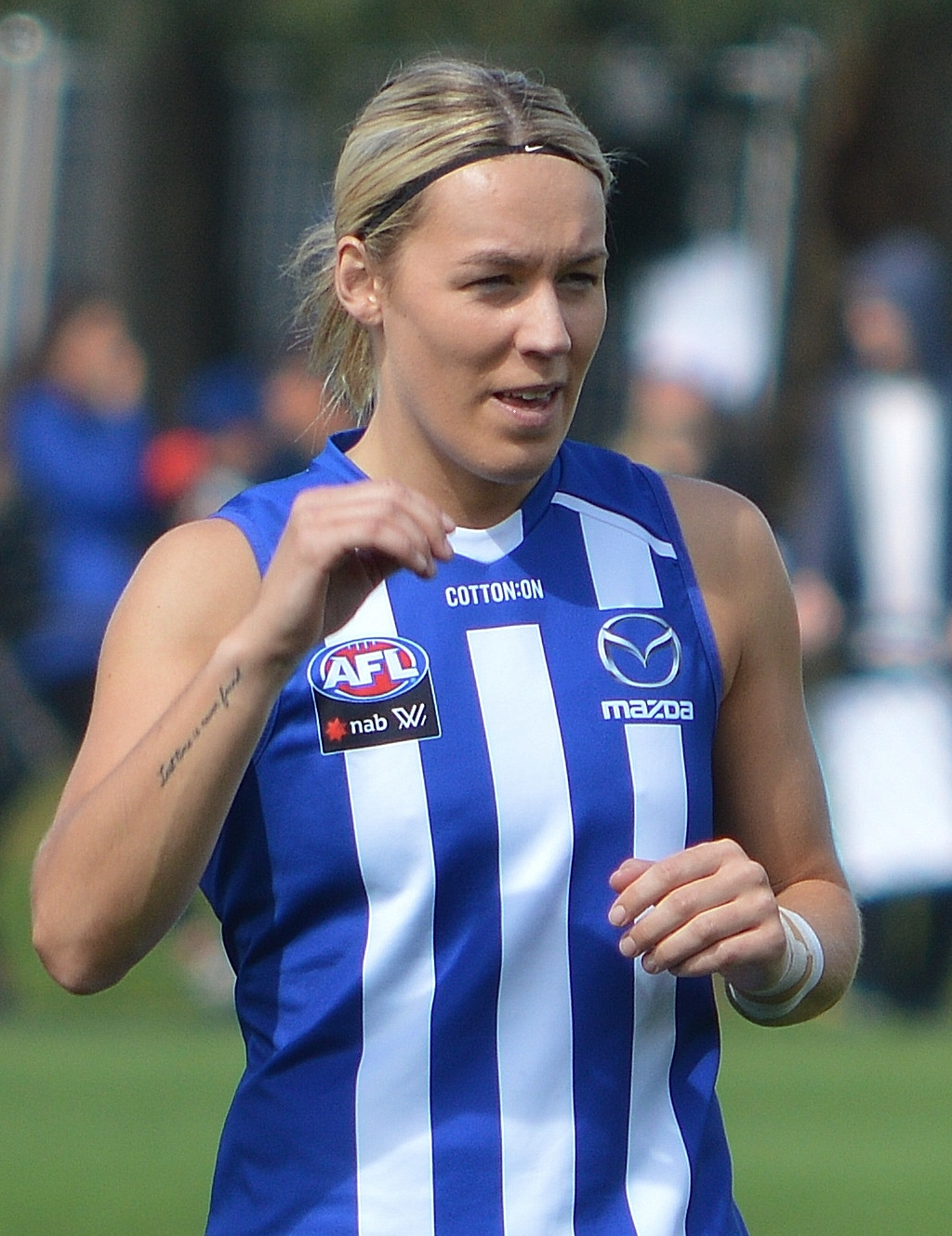
- Wright with North Melbourne in March 2021

Personal information
- Born: 6 May 1994 (age 32)
- Original team: Carlton (VFLW)
- Draft: No. 32, 2019 national draft
- Debut: Round 1, 2020, North Melbourne vs. Melbourne, at Casey Fields
- Height: 170 cm (5 ft 7 in)

Club information
- Current club: North Melbourne
- Number: 17

Playing career^{1}
Years	Club	Games (Goals)
2020–	North Melbourne	61 (1)
- ^{1} Playing statistics correct to the end of the 2024 season.

Career highlights
- AFLW premiership player: 2024

Sarah Wright (born 6 May 1994) is an Australian rules footballer playing for the North Melbourne Football Club in the AFL Women's (AFLW). Wright was drafted by North Melbourne with their second selection and thirty-second overall in the 2019 AFL Women's draft. She made her debut against Melbourne at Casey Fields in the opening round of the 2020 season.

== Statistics ==
Updated to the end of the 2024 season.

Legend
G	Goals	K	Kicks	D	Disposals	T	Tackles
B	Behinds	H	Handballs	M	Marks
#	Played in that season's premiership team

Season	Team	No.	Games	Totals							Averages (per game)							Votes
Season	Team	No.	Games	G	B	K	H	D	M	T	G	B	K	H	D	M	T	Votes
2020	North Melbourne	17	7	1	0	27	33	60	16	10	0.1	0.0	3.9	4.7	8.6	2.3	1.4	
2021	North Melbourne	17	5	0	0	25	15	40	13	7	0.0	0.0	5.0	3.0	8.0	2.6	1.4	
2022 (S6)	North Melbourne	17	9	0	0	44	39	83	29	11	0.0	0.0	4.9	4.3	9.2	3.2	1.2	
2022 (S7)	North Melbourne	17	13	0	0	55	44	99	30	23	0.0	0.0	4.2	3.6	7.6	2.3	1.8	
2023	North Melbourne	17	13	0	0	75	52	127	48	19	0.0	0.0	5.8	4.0	9.8	3.7	1.5	
2024^{#}	North Melbourne	17	14	0	0	87	52	139	47	34	0.0	0.0	5.8	4.0	9.8	3.7	1.5	
Career			61	1	0	312	235	548	183	104	0.0	0.0	5.1	3.9	9.0	3.0	1.7	
