= Breanna Koenen =

Australian rules footballer (born 1994)

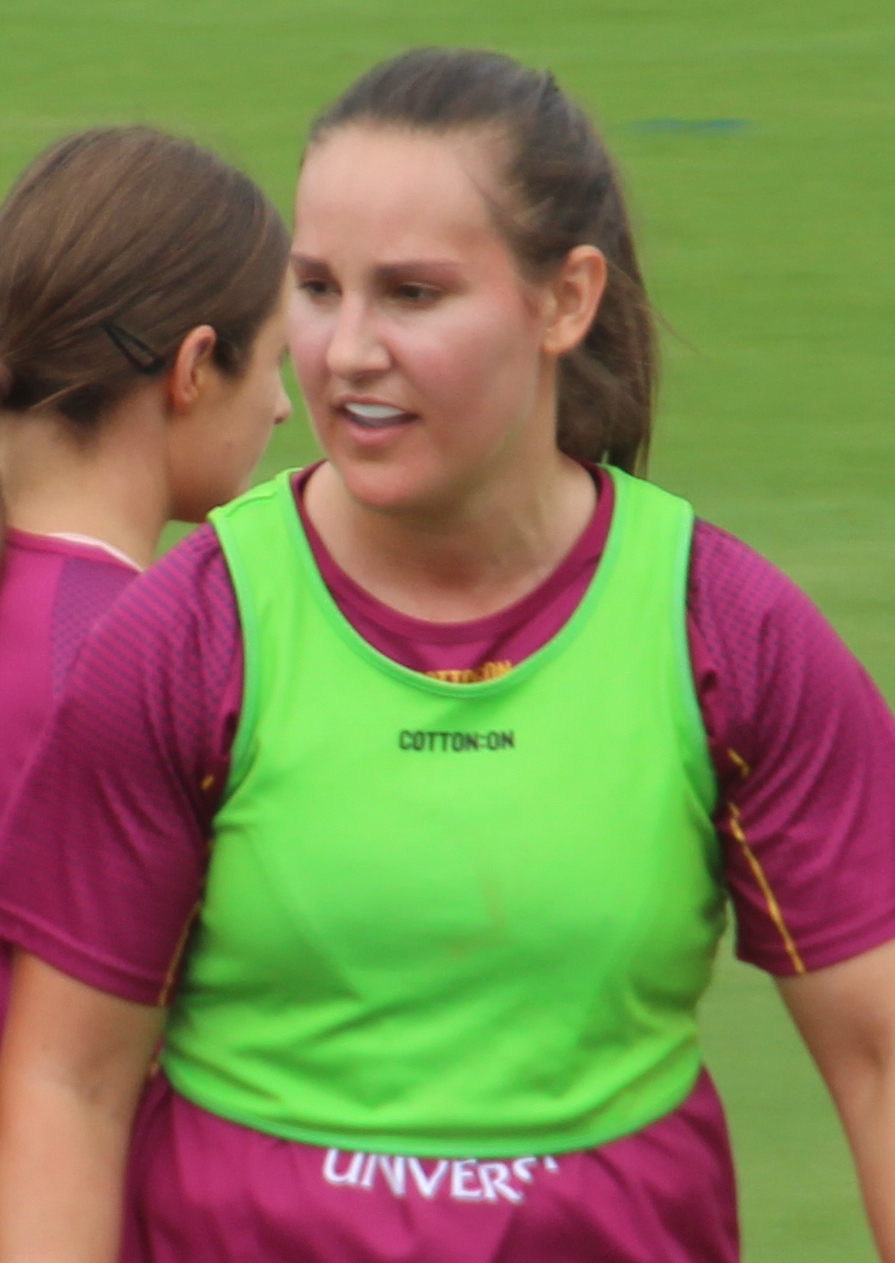
- Koenen warming up before the 2022 season 7 Grand Final

Personal information
- Full name: Breanna Koenen
- Nickname: Bre
- Born: 31 December 1994 (age 31); Magnetic Island, Queensland
- Original team: University of Queensland (QWAFL)
- Draft: No. 50, 2016 AFL Women's draft
- Debut: Round 1, 2017, Brisbane vs. Melbourne, at Casey Fields
- Height: 170 cm (5 ft 7 in)
- Position: Defender

Club information
- Current club: Brisbane
- Number: 3

Playing career^{1}
Years	Club	Games (Goals)
2017–	Brisbane	91 (3)
- ^{1} Playing statistics correct to the end of the 2023 season.

Career highlights
- Brisbane Lions captain: 2022 (S6)–; AFLW premiership player: 2021, 2023; AFL Women's Grand Final best-on-ground: 2023; AFL Women's All-Australian team: 2022 (S7)

Breanna L. Koenen (born 31 December 1994) is an Australian rules footballer and captain of the Brisbane Lions in the AFL Women's (AFLW).

== Early life and state football ==
She started playing for her home team, the Magnetic Island Magpies an AFL Townsville junior club based at Horseshoe Bay Magnetic Island, together with her siblings. She later played for the North Cairns Tigers during the summers, and was selected for Queensland at State level several times, including captaining the under-18 team in 2012. In 2014, Koenen was awarded a Clem Jones Scholarship to study exercise science at the University of Queensland and to play for the University of Queensland Red Lions. In her first two seasons at University of Queensland, she won the best and fairest award twice consecutively. The following season, in 2016, she was named in the QWAFL Team of the Year. In 2017, she was selected for a second time for the QWAFL Team of the Year and was awarded a UQ Blue award by the University of Queensland for enhancing the reputation of university sport. Following Koenen's rise to the highest level of playing, the Youth Girls' best on ground award at the SeaLink AFL Carnival was named the Breanna L. Koenen Medal after her.

== AFLW career ==
Koenen was recruited by Brisbane with the number 50 pick in the 2016 AFL Women's draft. She made her debut in Brisbane's inaugural game against Melbourne at Casey Fields on 5 February 2017. Brisbane signed Koenen for the 2018 season during the trade period in May 2017. In April 2019, Koenen re-signed with Brisbane for the 2020 season, and was then selected for the club's leadership group. During this season, she shifted forward from a back line defending role to the half-back line and the midfield. Koenen signed on with Brisbane for 2 more years on 15 June 2021, and was named the Lions' captain ahead of 2022 season 6.

== Statistics ==
Statistics are correct to the end of 2024.

Legend
G	Goals	K	Kicks	D	Disposals	T	Tackles
B	Behinds	H	Handballs	M	Marks

Season	Team	No.	Games	Totals							Averages (per game)							Votes
Season	Team	No.	Games	G	B	K	H	D	M	T	G	B	K	H	D	M	T	Votes
2017	Brisbane	3	8	0	0	34	17	51	13	19	0.0	0.0	4.3	2.1	6.4	1.6	2.4	0
2018	Brisbane	3	8	0	0	57	32	89	26	14	0.0	0.0	7.1	4.0	11.1	3.3	1.8	0
2019	Brisbane	3	5	1	0	38	15	53	12	14	0.2	0.0	7.6	3.0	10.6	2.4	2.8	0
2020	Brisbane	3	7	0	0	60	13	73	22	33	0.0	0.0	8.6	1.9	10.4	3.1	4.7	0
2021^{#}	Brisbane	3	11	0	0	100	29	129	30	21	0.0	0.0	9.1	2.6	11.7	2.7	1.9	0
2022 (S6)	Brisbane	3	12	0	0	92	26	118	19	28	0.0	0.0	7.6	2.1	9.8	1.5	2.3	0
2022 (S7)	Brisbane	3	13	0	0	109	27	136	52	28	0.0	0.0	8.4	2.1	10.5	4.0	2.2	0
2023^{#}	Brisbane	3	13	2	1	119	51	170	43	59	0.2	0.1	9.2	3.9	13.1	3.3	4.5	0
2024	Brisbane	3	14	0	1	153	35	188	57	29	0.0	0.1	10.9	2.5	13.4	4.1	2.1	1
Career			91	3	2	762	274	1007	274	245	0.0	0.0	8.4	2.7	11.1	3.0	2.7	1

== Personal life ==
Koenen was born on the last day of 1994 in Magnetic Island. Her siblings are all talented athletes too, with her brother, Dirk, playing football with the Gold Coast Academy, her sister, Cara, playing netball with the Sunshine Coast Lightning in the National Netball League, and her younger sister Alyssa was an Australian representative in surfing. She studied exercise science at the University of Queensland. Apart from playing football, she works as a physiotherapist. She attended school at The Cathedral School.
