= Julia Teakle =

Australian rules footballer

Personal information
- Full name: Julia Teakle
- Born: 12 August 2003 (age 23)
- Original team: East Fremantle (WAFLW)
- Height: 178 cm (5 ft 10 in)
- Position: Forward

Playing career
Years	Club	Games (Goals)
2022–	Port Adelaide	25 (19)

Julia Teakle (born 12 August 2003) is an Australian rules footballer who plays for the Port Adelaide Football Club in the AFL Women's (AFLW) competition. Originally from Northampton she played for East Fremantle in the WAFL Women's competition.

Teakle made her AFLW debut for Port Adelaide in 2022. She received Port Adelaide's Coaches' Award in 2023 and was selected in the AFL Players' Association's 22under22 team in 2024.

Teakle was appointed a co-vice-captain of Port Adelaide in 2025 and became a member of the club's leadership group from 2026.

== Personal life ==
Teakle's sister Tiani has also played with East Fremantle in the WAFLW, while her brother Bohan has played with Swan Districts. Her cousin, Brynn Teakle, played AFL football for Port Adelaide and North Melbourne.
