= 2024 AFL Women's best and fairest =

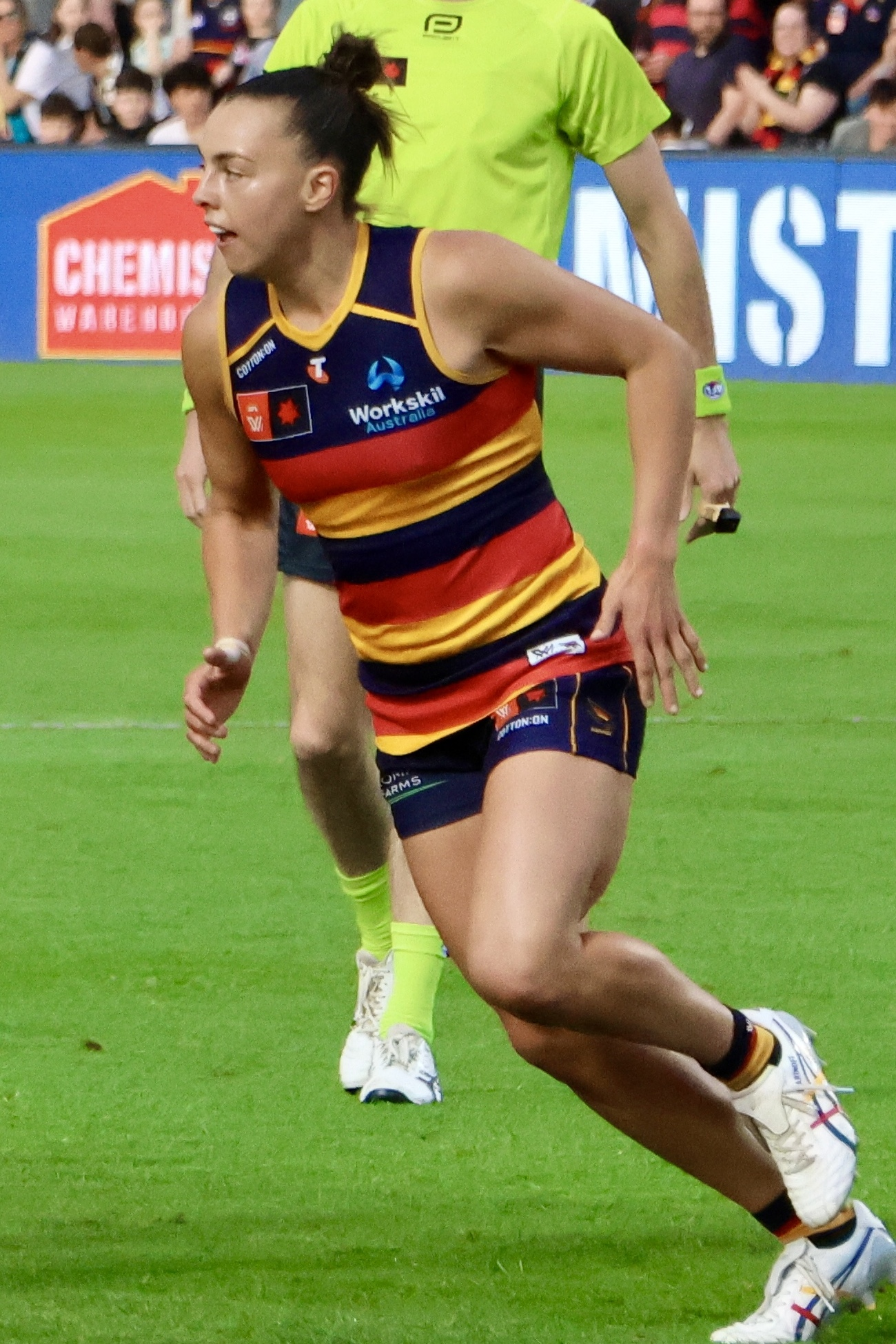
- Ebony Marinoff, 2024 winner
- Date: 25 November 2024
- Venue: Crown Melbourne
- Hosted by: Brihony Dawson; Lauren Wood
- Winner: Ebony Marinoff (Adelaide)

Television/radio coverage
- Network: Fox Footy

The 2024 AFL Women's best and fairest award was presented to the player adjudged the best and fairest player during the 2024 AFL Women's season. Adelaide's Ebony Marinoff won the award with 23 votes, equalling the league record tally set by Richmond's Monique Conti the previous season.

== Voting procedure ==
The three field umpires confer after each match and award three votes, two votes and one vote to the players they regard as the best, second-best and third-best in the match, respectively; the votes are kept secret until the awards night, and are read and tallied on the evening.

== Leading votegetters ==
2024 AFL Women's best and fairest top 12
Placing	Player	Votes
1	Ebony Marinoff (Adelaide)	23
2	Ash Riddell (North Melbourne)	20
3	Maddy Prespakis (Essendon)	18
4	Emily Bates (Hawthorn)	17
4	Monique Conti (Richmond)	17
4	Georgia Nanscawen (Essendon)	17
7	Sophie Conway (Brisbane)	14
8	Abbey Dowrick (Port Adelaide)	13
9	Jasmine Garner (North Melbourne)	12
9	Kate Hore (Melbourne)	12
9	Ella Roberts (West Coast)	12
9	Eliza West (Hawthorn)	12

== Votes by club ==
2024 AFL Women's best and fairest breakdown of votes by club
Adelaide	Brisbane	Carlton	Collingwood	Essendon	Fremantle
Ebony Marinoff – 23; Anne Hatchard – 6 Jess Allan – 4 Niamh Kelly – 4 Danielle Ponter – 4 Chelsea Biddell – 3 Caitlin Gould – 2 Maddi Newman – 2 Chelsea Randall – 1	Sophie Conway – 14; Taylor Smith – 9 Ally Anderson – 8 Belle Dawes – 8 Cathy Svarc – 7 Dakota Davidson – 2 Jade Ellenger – 2 Tahlia Hickie – 1 Breanna Koenen – 1	Keeley Sherar – 7 Breann Moody – 3 Darcy Vescio – 3 Maddy Guerin – 2 Mimi Hill – 1	Brittany Bonnici – 8 Sabrina Frederick – 3 Ruby Schleicher – 1	Maddy Prespakis – 18; Georgia Nanscawen – 17; Steph Cain – 3 Sophie Alexander – 1 Daria Bannister – 1 Kodi Jacques – 1	Mim Strom – 11; Aisling McCarthy – 10; Gabby O'Sullivan – 8 Hayley Miller – 7 Emma O'Driscoll – 3 Áine Tighe – 3 Gabby Newton – 1
Total – 49	Total – 52	Total – 16	Total – 12	Total – 41	Total – 43
Geelong	Gold Coast	Greater Western Sydney	Hawthorn	Melbourne	North Melbourne
Aishling Moloney – 9 Nina Morrison – 6 Georgie Prespakis – 6 Amy McDonald – 4 Gabbi Featherston – 1 Jackie Parry – 1	Charlie Rowbottom – 9 Lucy Single – 5 Niamh McLaughlin – 4 Claudia Whitfort – 2	Zarlie Goldsworthy – 6 Alyce Parker – 6 Rebecca Beeson – 4 Eilish O'Dowd – 4 Tarni Evans – 1 Haneen Zreika – 1	Emily Bates – 17; Eliza West – 12; Aileen Gilroy – 7 Jasmine Fleming – 6 Greta Bodey – 4 Mattea Breed – 3 Tilly Lucas-Rodd – 3 Áine McDonagh – 2 Lucy Wales – 2	Kate Hore – 12; Tyla Hanks – 8 Blaithin Mackin – 4 Alyssa Bannan – 3 Olivia Purcell – 2 Eliza McNamara – 1 Paxy Paxman – 1 Eden Zanker – 1	Ash Riddell – 20; Jasmine Garner – 12; Emma Kearney – 6 Alice O'Loughlin – 6 Kate Shierlaw – 6 Mia King – 4 Jenna Bruton – 2 Bella Eddey – 1 Taylah Gatt – 1
Total – 27	Total – 20	Total – 22	Total – 56	Total – 32	Total – 58
Port Adelaide	Richmond	St Kilda	Sydney	West Coast	Western Bulldogs
Abbey Dowrick – 13; Maria Moloney – 7 Gemma Houghton – 6 Matilda Scholz – 3 Julia Teakle – 3 Kirsty Lamb – 1 Justine Mules-Robinson – 1	Monique Conti – 17; Ellie McKenzie – 10; Grace Egan – 5 Katie Brennan – 2 Emelia Yassir – 2 Libby Graham – 1 Caitlin Greiser – 1 Poppy Kelly – 1	Jaimee Lambert – 11; Jesse Wardlaw – 7 Ashleigh Richards – 3 Tyanna Smith – 3 Paige Trudgeon – 2 Nicola Xenos – 1	Laura Gardiner – 8 Tanya Kennedy – 3 Bella Smith – 3 Cynthia Hamilton – 2 Ally Morphett – 2 Sofia Hurley – 1 Lucy McEvoy – 1 Rebecca Privitelli – 1	Ella Roberts – 12; Jess Hosking – 4 Alison Drennan – 2 Bella Lewis – 2 Kellie Gibson – 1	Isabelle Pritchard – 10; Rylie Wilcox – 5 Deanna Berry – 3 Jess Fitzgerald – 3 Ellie Blackburn – 1 Alice Edmonds – 1 Analea McKee – 1
Total – 34	Total – 39	Total – 27	Total – 21	Total – 21	Total – 24
