= AFL Coaches Association awards =

AFL awards voted by coaches

The AFL Coaches Association awards are a group of awards that have been presented annually since 2003, mainly to players and coaches in the Australian Football League (AFL), voted for by all AFL coaches.

== Awards ==
=== Champion player of the year ===
Awarded annually since 2003. Each week, the coaching panel of each AFL club give five votes to the player they consider to have been best on ground in the game in which their team plays, four to the second-best, and so on to one to the fifth-best. The player with the most votes at the end of the year wins. The award has different rules to many "best and fairest" awards, as player suspensions are disregarded.

Year	Winner	Club
2003	Nathan Buckley	Collingwood
2004	Warren Tredrea	Port Adelaide
2005	Barry Hall	Sydney
2006	Simon Goodwin	Adelaide
2006	Adam Goodes	Sydney
2007	Gary Ablett Jr.	Geelong
2008	Gary Ablett Jr. (2)	Geelong
2009	Gary Ablett Jr. (3)	Geelong
2010	Dane Swan	Collingwood
2011	Marc Murphy	Carlton
2012	Trent Cotchin	Richmond
2013	Scott Pendlebury	Collingwood
2014	Robbie Gray	Port Adelaide
2015	Dan Hannebery	Sydney
2016	Patrick Dangerfield	Geelong
2017	Dustin Martin	Richmond
2018	Max Gawn	Melbourne
2019	Marcus Bontempelli	Western Bulldogs
2020	Lachie Neale	Brisbane Lions
2021	Clayton Oliver	Melbourne
2022	Touk Miller	Gold Coast
2022	Clayton Oliver (2)	Melbourne
2023	Zak Butters	Port Adelaide
2024	Nick Daicos	Collingwood
2025	Noah Anderson	Gold Coast
2025	Bailey Smith	Geelong
2026	Nick Daicos (2)	Collingwood

=== Gary Ayres Award ===
Awarded since 2016. Each week during the finals series, the senior coach of each competing AFL club gives five votes to the player they consider to be best on ground in the game their team plays in, four to the second-best, and so on to one for the fifth-best. The votes given in the Grand Final are counted as worth 150% compared to the other finals. The player with the most votes at the end of the finals series wins. The award is named after Gary Ayres, a five-time VFL/AFL premiership player and Australian Football Hall of Fame inductee.

Year	Winner	Club
2016	Josh Kennedy	Sydney
2017	Dustin Martin	Richmond
2018	Steele Sidebottom	Collingwood
2019	Dustin Martin (2)	Richmond
2020	Dustin Martin (3)	Richmond
2021	Jackson Macrae	Western Bulldogs
2022	Patrick Dangerfield	Geelong
2023	Sam Walsh	Carlton
2024	Lachie Neale	Brisbane Lions
2025	Will Ashcroft	Brisbane Lions
2026	Will Ashcroft (2)	Brisbane Lions

=== Best emerging player ===
Awarded annually since 2003 (as "best young player" from 2003 to 2025). There is no age or game limit. Awarded to the best player inside the first two seasons of their AFL careers based on the weekly AFLCA Player of the Year votes.

Year	Winner	Club
2003	Chris Judd	West Coast
2004	Daniel Wells	Kangaroos
2005	Adam Cooney	Western Bulldogs
2006	Ryan Griffen	Western Bulldogs
2007	Scott Pendlebury	Collingwood
2008	Joel Selwood	Geelong
2009	Cyril Rioli	Hawthorn
2010	Stephen Hill	Fremantle
2011	Nat Fyfe	Fremantle
2012	Dyson Heppell	Essendon
2013	Jeremy Cameron	Greater Western Sydney
2014	Jaeger O'Meara	Gold Coast
2015	Marcus Bontempelli	Western Bulldogs
2016	Isaac Heeney	Sydney
2017	Clayton Oliver	Melbourne
2018	Tom Stewart	Geelong
2019	Tim Kelly	Geelong
2020	Sam Walsh	Carlton
2021	Noah Anderson	Gold Coast
2021	Caleb Serong	Fremantle
2022	Jai Newcombe	Hawthorn
2023	Nick Daicos	Collingwood
2024	Harry Sheezel	North Melbourne
2025	Shaun Mannagh	Geelong
2026	Max Hall	St Kilda
2026	Murphy Reid	Fremantle

=== Defensive player of the year ===
Awarded annually since 2026. Each week, the coaching panel of each AFL club give two votes to the player they consider to have had the best defensive performance in the game their team plays and one to the second-best. The player with the most votes at the end of the year wins.

Year	Winner	Club
2026	Callum Wilkie	St Kilda

=== Allan Jeans Senior Coach of the Year Award ===
Awarded annually since 2003. At the end of the season, all AFL coaches give three votes to the senior coach they adjudge to have performed the best over that season, two to the second-best, and one to the third-best. The coach with the most votes wins. Chris Fagan is the only coach who has won the award three times. Ken Hinkley, Luke Beveridge, John Longmire, John Worsfold and Mark Thompson have won the award more than once, with two each.

(†) indicates that the recipient was a premiership coach in the same year.

Year	Winner	Club
2003	Paul Roos	Sydney
2004	Mark Williams†	Port Adelaide
2005	Neil Craig	Adelaide
2006	John Worsfold†	West Coast
2007	Mark Thompson†	Geelong
2008	Mark Thompson (2)	Geelong
2009	Ross Lyon	St Kilda
2010	Mick Malthouse†	Collingwood
2011	John Worsfold (2)	West Coast
2012	John Longmire†	Sydney
2013	Ken Hinkley	Port Adelaide
2014	John Longmire (2)	Sydney
2015	Luke Beveridge	Western Bulldogs
2016	Luke Beveridge† (2)	Western Bulldogs
2017	Damien Hardwick†	Richmond
2018	Nathan Buckley	Collingwood
2019	Chris Fagan	Brisbane Lions
2020	Ken Hinkley (2)	Port Adelaide
2021	Simon Goodwin†	Melbourne
2022	Craig McRae	Collingwood
2023	Adam Kingsley	Greater Western Sydney
2024	Chris Fagan† (2)	Brisbane Lions
2025	Chris Fagan† (3)	Brisbane Lions
2026	Justin Longmuir	Fremantle

=== Assistant coach of the year ===
Awarded annually since 2003. At the end of the season, all AFL coaches and players rate their club's assistant coaches out of ten, with ten being the highest score. Assistant coaches' scores are then averaged, and the coach with the highest score wins.

Year	Winner	Club
2003	Neil Craig	Adelaide
2004	Phil Walsh	Port Adelaide
2005	Robert Wiley	West Coast
2006	John Longmire	Sydney
2007	Tony Micale	West Coast
2008	Tony Elshaug	St Kilda
2009	Mark Riley	Carlton
2010	Brendan McCartney	Geelong
2011	Darren Crocker	North Melbourne
2012	Peter Sumich	Fremantle
2013	Robert Harvey	Collingwood
2014	Brett Montgomery	Western Bulldogs
2015	Adam Kingsley	St Kilda
2016	Stuart Dew	Sydney
2017	Rhyce Shaw	Sydney
2018	Rhyce Shaw (2)	Sydney
2019	Craig McRae	Richmond
2020	Daniel Giansiracusa	Western Bulldogs
2021	Luke Power	Carlton
2022	Troy Chaplin	Melbourne
2023	James Rahilly	Adelaide
2024	Daniel Pratt	Western Bulldogs
2025	Cameron Bruce	Brisbane Lions
2026	Jordan Roughead	Collingwood

=== Development coach of the year ===
Awarded in 2012 and 2013 and then reintroduced annually from 2022. Based on 50–50 input from both players and coaches, it is awarded to the highest-ranked AFL development coach based on "their overall performance [that] year".

Year	Winner	Club
2012	Craig McRae	Collingwood
2013	Chris Maple	Western Bulldogs
2022	Michael Godden	Adelaide
2023	Michael Godden (2)	Adelaide
2023	Mark Williams	Melbourne
2024	Michael Barlow	North Melbourne
2025	David Mackay	Hawthorn
2026	Nigel Lappin	Geelong

=== Phil Walsh Memorial Scholarship ===
Awarded annually since 2016. Awarded to an AFL coach who is "committed to developing themselves via study and travel".

Year	Winner	Club
2016	Ben Rutten	Richmond
2017	Adrian Hickmott	West Coast
2018	Aaron Greaves	Port Adelaide
2019	Damian Truslove	Greater Western Sydney
2020	Luke Kelly	Greater Western Sydney
2021	Scott Selwood	Collingwood
2022	Neville Jetta	Collingwood
2023	Tim Clarke	Carlton
2024	Brad Ebert	Carlton
2025	Matt Spangher	Western Bulldogs
2026	Troy Chaplin	Melbourne

=== Career & Education Award ===
Awarded annually since 2014. Awarded to an AFL coach who has "shown exceptional commitment to their professional development".

Year	Winner	Club
2014	Steven King	Western Bulldogs
2015	Paul Hudson	St Kilda
2016	Andrew McQualter	Richmond
2016	Danny Sexton	St Kilda
2017	Mitch Hahn	Brisbane Lions
2018	Jordan Russell	Western Bulldogs
2019	Dan Jordan	Essendon
2020	not awarded	
2021	Jaymie Graham	West Coast
2022	Daniel Pratt	West Coast
2023	Adrian Hickmott	Hawthorn
2024	Dale Tapping	Essendon
2025	Murray Davis	Adelaide
2026	James Kelly	Geelong

=== Neale Daniher Lifetime Achievement Award ===
Awarded annually since 2003. In recognition of "an individual who has made an outstanding contribution" to Australian rules football. Renamed from Lifetime Achievement Award to Neale Daniher Lifetime Achievement Award in 2019.

Year	Winner
2003	Haydn Bunton Jr.
2004	Neil Kerley
2005	John Todd
2006	John Grant
2007	Wally Miller
2008	Ian Ridley
2009	Bruce Reid
2009	Ian Reynolds
2010	Barrie Downs
2011	Russell Ebert
2011	Geoff Walsh
2012	John Beveridge
2013	George Stone
2014	Neale Daniher
2015	David Wheadon
2016	Mark Williams
2017	John Dimmer
2018	Alan Stewart
2019	Stephen Wells
2020	Neil Balme
2021	Ian Miller
2022	Alan McConnell
2023	Neil Craig
2024	John Worsfold
2025	Chris Fagan
2026	Shane O'Sullivan

=== Coaching Legend Award ===
Awarded annually from 2009 to 2018. Awarded to a former VFL/AFL coach who has achieved "significant achievement and success".

Year	Winner	VFL/AFL club/s
2009	John Kennedy Sr.	Hawthorn
2009	John Kennedy Sr.	North Melbourne
2010	Ron Barrassi	Carlton
2010	Ron Barrassi	North Melbourne
2010	Ron Barrassi	Melbourne
2010	Ron Barrassi	Sydney
2011	Tom Hafey	Richmond
2011	Tom Hafey	Collingwood
2011	Tom Hafey	Geelong
2011	Tom Hafey	Sydney
2012	David Parkin	Hawthorn
2012	David Parkin	Carlton
2012	David Parkin	Fitzroy
2013	Jock McHale	Collingwood
2013	Leigh Matthews	Collingwood
2013	Leigh Matthews	Brisbane Lions
2014	Kevin Sheedy	Essendon
2014	Kevin Sheedy	Greater Western Sydney
2015	Allan Jeans	St Kilda
2015	Allan Jeans	Hawthorn
2015	Allan Jeans	Richmond
2016	Mick Malthouse	Footscray
2016	Mick Malthouse	West Coast
2016	Mick Malthouse	Collingwood
2016	Mick Malthouse	Carlton
2017	Malcolm Blight	North Melbourne
2017	Malcolm Blight	Geelong
2017	Malcolm Blight	Adelaide
2017	Malcolm Blight	St Kilda
2018	Denis Pagan	North Melbourne
2018	Denis Pagan	Carlton

=== Media Award ===
Awarded annually since 2009. Awarded to an individual who displays "respected and insightful coverage of AFL football at the professional level". All AFL coaches can nominate an individual.

Year	Winner
2009	Greg Baum
2010	Daniel Harford
2011	Samantha Lane
2012	Jake Niall
2013	Daryl Timms
2014	Gerard Whateley
2015	Gerard Whateley (2)
2016	Gerard Whateley (3)
2017	Gerard Whateley (4)
2018	Gerard Whateley (5)
2019	Gerard Whateley (6)
2020	Gerard Whateley (7)
2021	Gerard Whateley (8)
2022	Gerard Whateley (9)
2023	Gerard Whateley (10)
2024	Gerard Whateley (11)
2025	Gerard Whateley (12)

=== Support Staff Leadership Award ===
Awarded annually from 2003 to 2014. Awarded to an Australian rules support staff member who shows "outstanding contribution, innovation, [or] initiative in carrying out [their] duties".

Year	Winner	VFL/AFL club/s
2003	Barry Gavin	Hawthorn
2004	Bill Sutherland	West Coast
2005	Eddie Walsh	Western Bulldogs
2006	Ted Soderblom	Richmond
2007	Noel Judkins	Richmond
2007	Noel Judkins	Essendon
2007	Noel Judkins	Collingwood
2008	Shane O'Sullivan	Carlton
2008	Shane O'Sullivan	Footscray
2008	Shane O'Sullivan	Brisbane Bears
2008	Shane O'Sullivan	North Melbourne
2009	Ken Whiffen	St Kilda
2010	Ilmar Tiltins	Richmond
2011	Arthur Wilkinson	Melbourne
2012	John Kilpatrick	Hawthorn
2013	Stephen Wells	Geelong
2014	John Kilby	Essendon

=== All-Australian team ===
A representative team was selected by the AFLCA in 2015 and 2016. In its first year, in what was described as "ditching traditional positions in favour of modern tactics," in each position on the field (decided by analysts), the highest-scoring player from the Champion Player of the Year Award voting was chosen. In its final year, a more traditional team line-up was selected.

==== 2015 team ====
2015 AFL Coaches Association All-Australian team
Name	Position	Club
Easton Wood	Tall/medium defender	Western Bulldogs
Alex Rance	Tall defender	Richmond
Zach Tuohy	Small defender	Carlton
Robert Murphy	Medium defender	Western Bulldogs
Cale Hooker	Tall defender	Essendon
Jarrad McVeigh	Medium defender	Sydney
Todd Goldstein	Ruckman	North Melbourne
Dan Hannebery	Inside/outside midfielder	Sydney
Nat Fyfe	Inside midfielder	Fremantle
Josh P. Kennedy	Inside midfielder	Sydney
Matt Priddis	Inside midfielder	West Coast
Andrew Gaff	Inside/outside midfielder	West Coast
Patrick Dangerfield	Inside/outside midfielder	Adelaide
Jake Stringer	Key forward	Western Bulldogs
Brett Deledio	High half-forward	Richmond
Chad Wingard	Small forward	Port Adelaide
Josh J. Kennedy	Key forward	West Coast
Jack Gunston	Tall/medium forward	Hawthorn
David Mundy	Interchange inside midfielder	Fremantle
Scott Pendlebury (captain)	Interchange inside/outside midfielder	Collingwood
Bernie Vince	Interchange inside/outside midfielder	Melbourne
Nic Naitanui	Interchange ruckman	West Coast

==== 2016 team ====
2016 AFL Coaches Association All-Australian team
B:	Josh Gibson (Hawthorn)	Alex Rance (Richmond)	Rory Laird (Adelaide)
HB:	Callan Ward (Greater Western Sydney)	Robbie Tarrant (North Melbourne)	Corey Enright (Geelong)
C:	Marcus Bontempelli (Western Bulldogs)	Joel Selwood (Geelong, captain)	Patrick Dangerfield (Geelong)
HF:	Dan Hannebery (Sydney)	Tom Lynch (Gold Coast)	Robbie Gray (Port Adelaide)
F:	Eddie Betts (Adelaide)	Josh Kennedy (West Coast)	Nick Riewoldt (St Kilda)
Foll:	Max Gawn (Melbourne)	Rory Sloane (Adelaide)	Dustin Martin (Richmond)
Int:	Luke Parker (Sydney)	Scott Pendlebury (Collingwood)	Luke Shuey (West Coast)
	Todd Goldstein (North Melbourne)		

=== AFLW champion player of the year ===
Awarded each season since 2018. Each week, the senior coach of each AFL Women's club gives five votes to the player they consider to be best on ground in the game in which their team plays, four to the second-best, and so on to one for the fifth-best. The player with the most votes at the end of the season wins. The award has different rules to many "best and fairest" awards, as player suspensions are disregarded.

Season	Winner	Club
2018	Emma Kearney	Western Bulldogs
2018	Chelsea Randall	Adelaide
2019	Erin Phillips	Adelaide
2020	Jasmine Garner	North Melbourne
2021	Kiara Bowers	Fremantle
2022 (S6)	Emily Bates	Brisbane
2022 (S7)	Jasmine Garner (2)	North Melbourne
2023	Jasmine Garner (3)	North Melbourne
2024	Ebony Marinoff	Adelaide
2025	Ash Riddell	North Melbourne

=== AFLW senior coach of the year ===
Awarded each season since 2019. After the preliminary finals, the senior coach of each AFL Women's club gives three votes to the other coach they consider to have performed best throughout the season, two to the second-best, and one to the third-best. The coach with the most votes from this process wins.

Season	Winner	Club
2019	Daniel Harford	Carlton
2020	Trent Cooper	Fremantle
2021	Craig Starcevich	Brisbane
2022 (S6)	Mick Stinear	Melbourne
2022 (S7)	Craig Starcevich (2)	Brisbane
2023	Scott Gowans	Sydney
2023	Craig Starcevich (3)	Brisbane
2024	Darren Crocker	North Melbourne
