= Ebony Marinoff =

Australian rules footballer

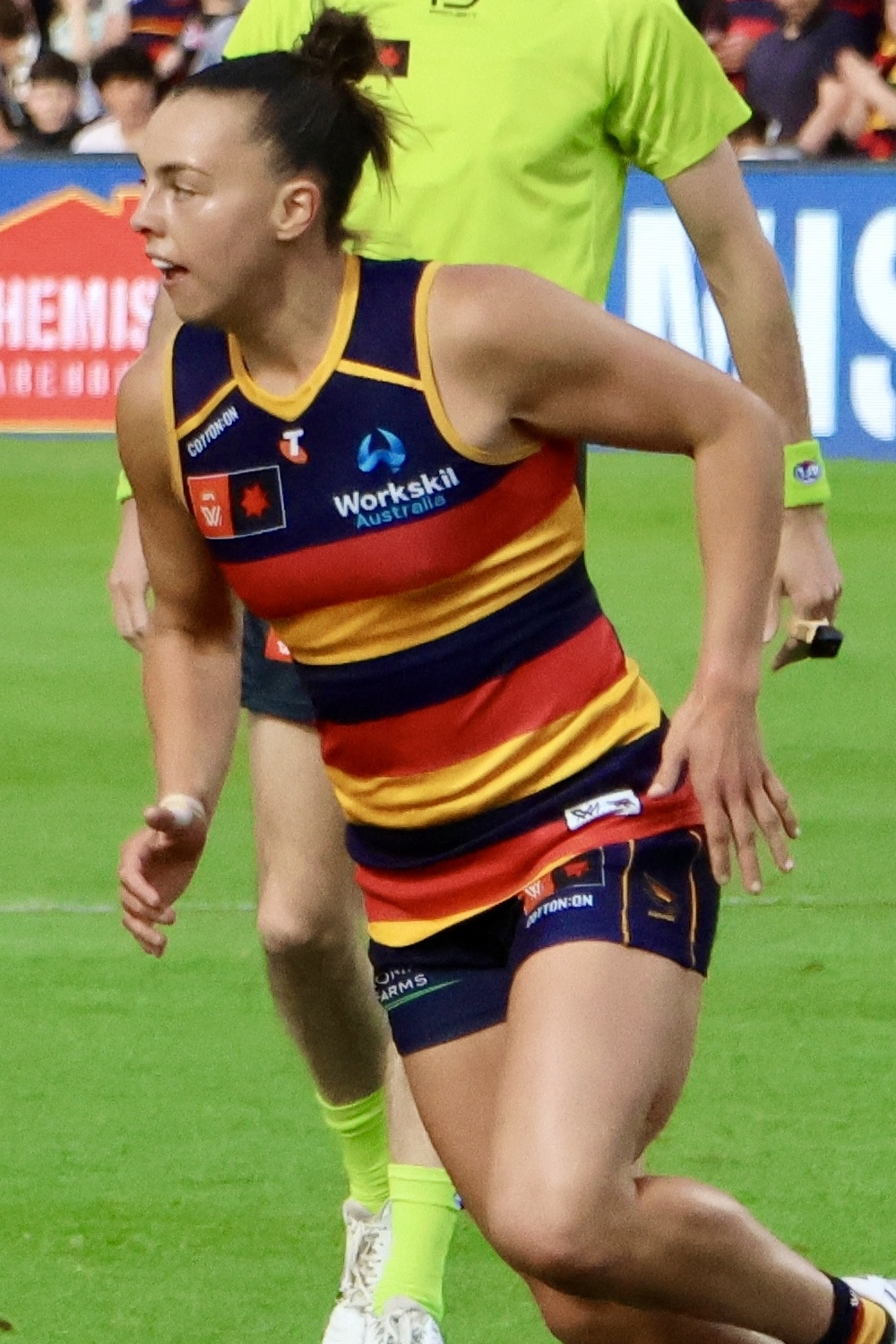
- Marinoff playing for Adelaide in 2025

Personal information
- Full name: Ebony Valerie Marinoff
- Born: 15 November 1997 (age 28); Adelaide
- Original team: Morphettville Park (SAWFL)
- Draft: No. 7, 2016 national draft
- Debut: Round 1, 2017, Adelaide vs. Greater Western Sydney, at Thebarton Oval
- Height: 169 cm (5 ft 7 in)
- Position: Midfielder

Club information
- Current club: Adelaide
- Number: 10

Playing career^{1}
Years	Club	Games (Goals)
2017–	Adelaide	107 (17)

Representative team honours^{2}
Years	Team	Games (Goals)
2017	The Allies	1 (0)
2026	Australia	1 (0)
- ^{1} Playing statistics correct to the end of the 2025 season.^{2} Representative statistics correct as of 2026.

Career highlights
- 3× AFL Women's premiership player: 2017, 2019, S6; Adelaide co-captain: 2024–; AFL Women's best and fairest: 2024; AFLPA AFLW most valuable player: 2024; AFLCA AFLW champion player of the year: 2024; Adelaide games record holder; 7× AFL Women's All-Australian team: 2017, 2019, 2021, S6, S7, 2023, 2024; 4× Adelaide Club Champion: 2021, 2023, 2024, 2025; AFLPA AFLW best captain: 2024; Showdown Medal: 2024; AFL Women's Rising Star: 2017

Ebony Valerie Marinoff (born 15 November 1997) is an Australian rules footballer playing for the Adelaide Football Club in the AFL Women's (AFLW). She is a three-time AFL Women's premiership player, seven-time AFL Women's All-Australian and four-time Adelaide Club Champion. In 2017, Marinoff won the inaugural AFL Women's Rising Star award and represented The Allies in the inaugural AFL Women's State of Origin match, and in 2024, she won the AFL Women's best and fairest, AFLPA AFLW most valuable player, AFLPA AFLW best captain and AFLCA AFLW champion player of the year awards. Marinoff has served as Adelaide co-captain since 2024, and is the club's games record holder with 107 games.

== Early life ==
Marinoff's first introduction to the sport was through the Auskick program. She first played competitive football at the age of five in the boys team at Lockleys Football Club in the Adelaide suburb of Lockleys. She remained at the club through to the age of twelve. She later moved on to play with an all-girls team at Morphettville Park. In 2014, at sixteen years of age, she played in her first premiership with the senior side at Morphettville Park, and played in two more premierships in 2015 and 2016. Marinoff represented South Australia in under-16, under-18 and open age teams. In 2015, she was named in the youth girls All-Australian team.

Marinoff played for South Australia in the 2016 women's exhibition series. She was named best-on-ground for a 37-disposal performance in a South Australia intra-club match at Adelaide Oval in April and kicked the match-winning goal in the late stages of the final quarter against NSW/ACT at Adelaide Oval in June. In September, she played for Melbourne in the women's all-star exhibition match at VU Whitten Oval.

== AFL Women's career ==
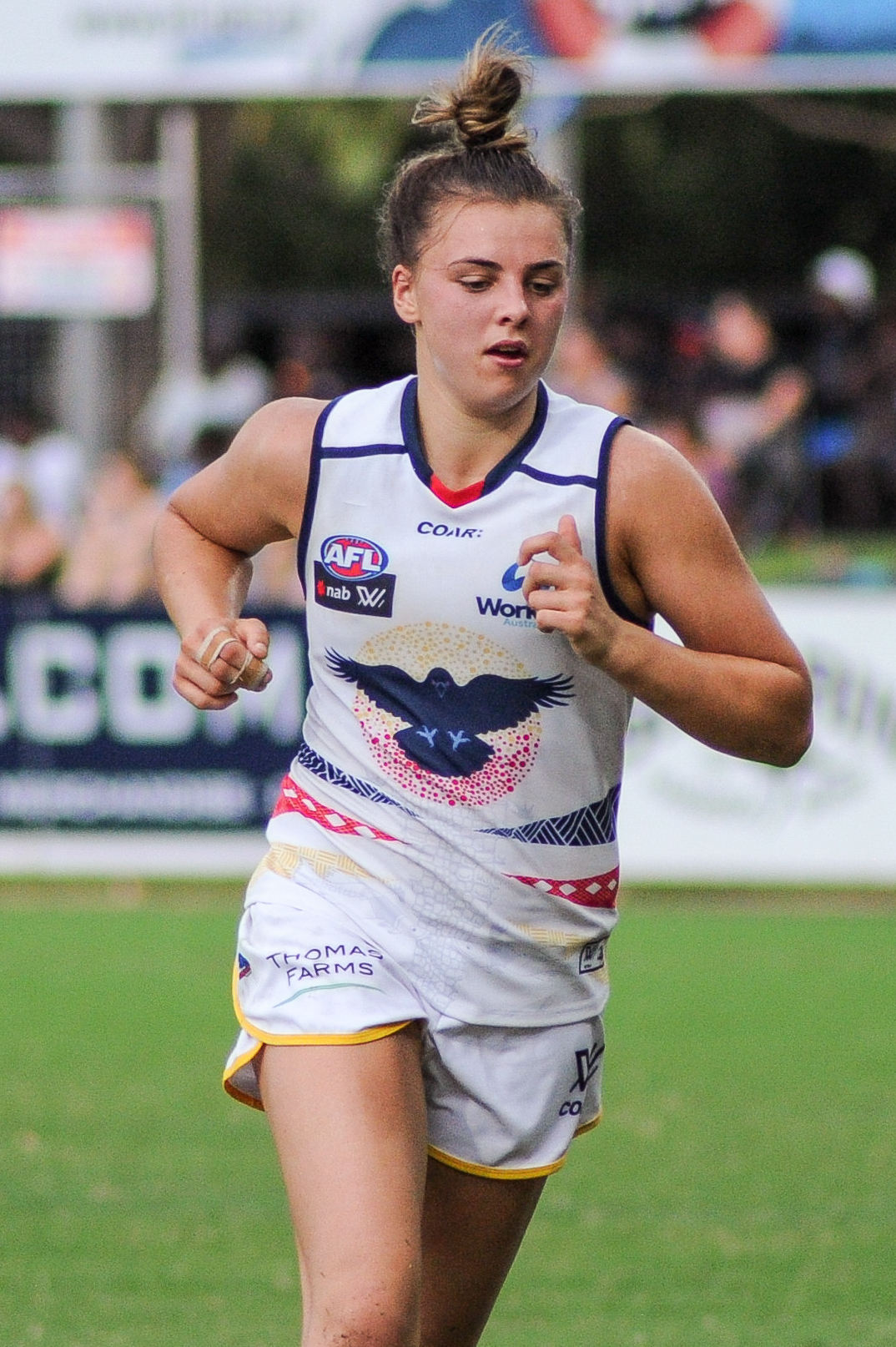
Marinoff playing for Adelaide in 2017

=== 2017 ===
Marinoff was drafted by Adelaide with the club's first selection and seventh overall in the 2016 AFL Women's draft. Marinoff made her debut in the club's inaugural match in round 1, 2017 against Greater Western Sydney at Thebarton Oval, where she gathered a game-high twenty disposals and six tackles in the 36-point win. Her performance earned her a nomination for the 2017 AFL Women's Rising Star award. Marinoff was a member of the Adelaide team that won the inaugural AFL Women's premiership in 2017, defeating Brisbane by six points at Metricon Stadium. A few days later, Marinoff was named in the 2017 AFL Women's All-Australian team and announced as the 2017 AFL Women's Rising Star. She also led the competition in tackles (76) and average tackles per game (9.5) in its inaugural season. Adelaide signed Marinoff for the 2018 season during the trade period in May 2017. Following the AFL Women's season, Marinoff played for Darebin in the VFL Women's (VFLW), also winning a premiership. She later played for The Allies in the inaugural AFL Women's State of Origin match on 2 September, where she was named among the Allies' best players with 13 disposals and five tackles.

=== 2018 ===
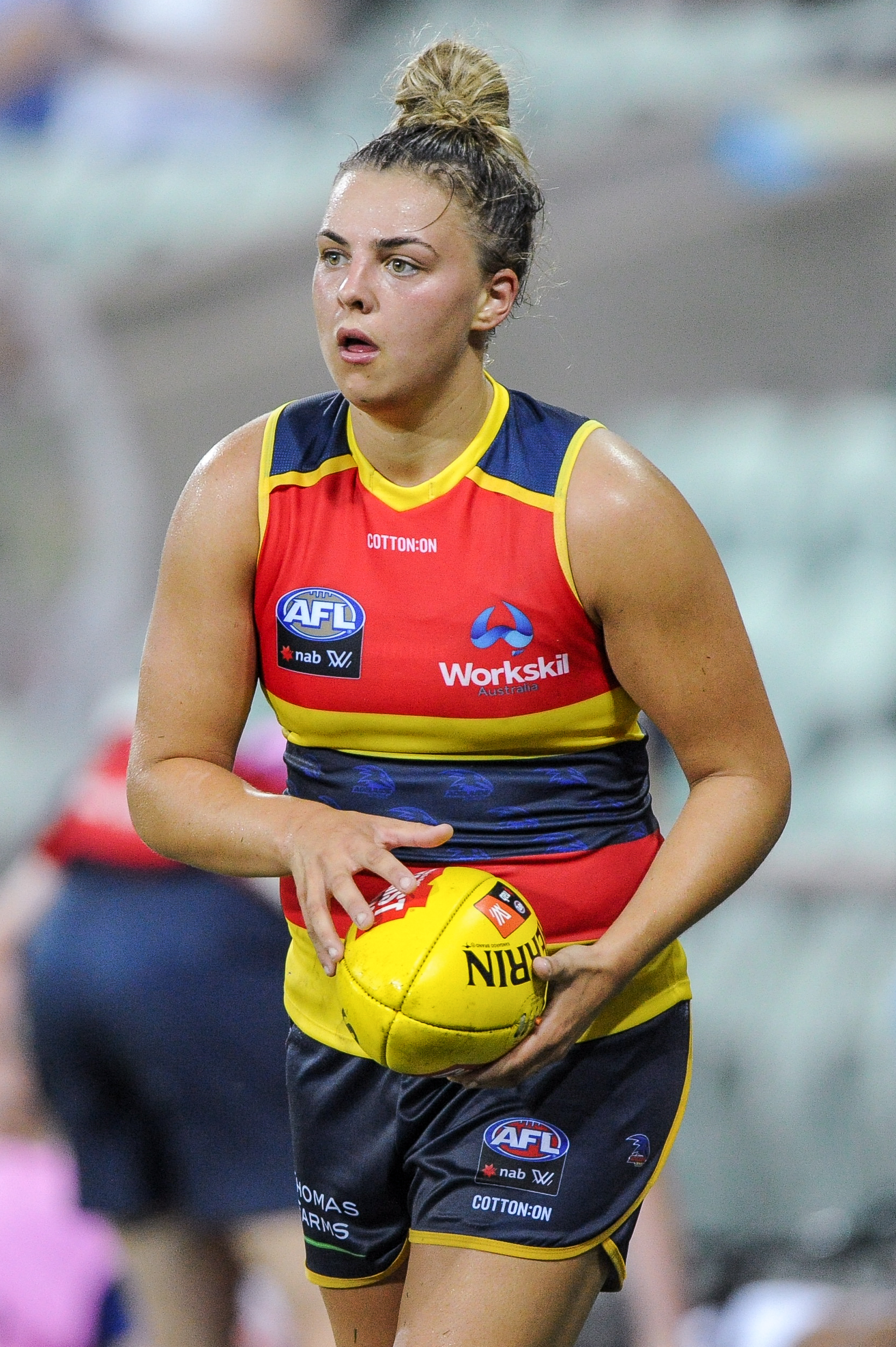
Marinoff during a pre-season practice match with Adelaide in 2018

After an impressive start to the 2018 season, in round 4, Marinoff set a new record for tackles with 21 in her side's draw against Greater Western Sydney in heavy rain at Blacktown ISP Oval, breaking the record of 16 set by Carlton midfielder Sarah Hosking two weeks earlier. The effort also bested the existing men's league record of 19, thus setting the national senior-level record across men's and women's competitions for tackles. Marinoff was selected in afl.com.au's Team of the Week in rounds 3, 4, 5 and 7, and finished equal-fifth in the 2018 AFL Women's best and fairest count with six votes. She was also named in the initial 2018 AFL Women's All-Australian 40-woman squad. Marinoff again finished the season leading the competition in tackles (82) and average tackles per game (11.7); both statistics were better than her previous season and in less games (Marinoff played eight of eight possible games in 2017 and seven of seven possible games in 2018). Adelaide signed Marinoff for the 2019 season prior to the trading and signing period in May 2018 after she chose not to accept an offer from one of Geelong or North Melbourne.

=== 2019 ===
In round 3 of the 2019 season, Marinoff broke the league disposal record of 30 set by Emma Kearney in round 6 of the 2017 season, recording 33 disposals in Adelaide's win against Geelong at Norwood Oval (a record which was later broken by teammate Anne Hatchard in 2020), and was selected in womens.afl's Team of the Week in rounds 1, 3 and 6. Marinoff went on to play in Adelaide's second premiership, when they defeated Carlton by 45 points in front of a record AFL Women's crowd at Adelaide Oval, and was named among their best players. She was also named in the 2019 AFL Women's All-Australian team, her second All-Australian selection, and finished equal-fourth in the 2019 AFL Women's best and fairest count with seven votes. Marinoff finished the season leading the competition in kicks (130), disposals (205) and average disposals per game (22.8), along with finishing second in handballs (75), average handballs per game (8.3), tackles (74) and average tackles per game (8.2), in a career-best season. She also kicked her first AFL Women's goal in round 7 and followed up with two in the preliminary final, and finished the season as one of only three players (along with teammates Deni Varnhagen and Stevie-Lee Thompson) to have played the most AFL Women's matches to that point with 24. Adelaide signed Marinoff for the 2020 season during the trade and signing period in April 2019.

=== 2020 ===
Leading into the 2020 season, womens.afl journalist Sarah Black named Marinoff at no. 15 on her list of the top 30 players in the AFLW. She was selected in womens.afl's Team of the Week in rounds 2 and 3. Marinoff finished the home-and-away season equal with North Melbourne's Ashleigh Riddell in first for kicks (94) and average kicks per game (15.7), also improving her career-best average in disposals per game (23.2), and was one of fourteen players to have played the most AFL Women's matches to that point with 30. She was selected in the initial 40-woman squad for the 2020 AFL Women's All-Australian team, and was also selected in the AFL Players Association's inaugural AFL Women's 22under22 team, having earlier been selected in the retrospective 2017–2019 team.

=== 2021 ===
During a practice match in the 2021 pre-season, Marinoff made front-on contact with Greater Western Sydney player Bríd Stack in an incident that saw Stack suffer a fractured vertebra and was given a three-match suspension, the longest suspension in the competition's history to that point. Commentators such as Kane Cornes and his father, inaugural Crows AFL coach Graham Cornes, suggested that the incident was unavoidable and the club should appeal the decision. Adelaide eventually announced that it would appeal the decision, with the club calling it "grossly disproportionate" and coach Matthew Clarke calling the incident an "unavoidable footy collision". After the appeal was initially delayed due to new video evidence found by Marinoff herself, her suspension was successfully overturned by the appeals board after a hearing that lasted more than three hours, allowing Marinoff to play in the opening round of the season. Melbourne captain Daisy Pearce voluntarily provided a character reference. After leading the competition in total and average kicks during the 2021 season, Marinoff was named in the 2021 AFL Women's All-Australian team and won her first Adelaide Club Champion award. In June, she declined a large offer from St Kilda to re-sign with Adelaide. Marinoff was also selected in Champion Data's 2021 AFLW All-Star stats team, after placing in the top ten for every midfield statistical category.

=== 2022 ===
==== Season 6 ====
Marinoff was named at no. 6 in Sarah Black's 2022 season 6 list of the top 30 players in the AFLW, which was Marinoff's first appearance in the top ten. She was among Adelaide's best players in its opening round win against Brisbane and was best afield in Adelaide's win over West Coast in round 3 with a game-high 23 disposals and six tackles; she polled eight coaches' votes and was selected in womens.afl's Team of the Week for that round. Marinoff was named among Adelaide's best players with 26 disposals in its win over Melbourne in round 4 and was selected in womens.afl's Team of the Week for that round. She was best afield in Adelaide's win over Carlton in round 5 with 31 disposals, eight marks and ten tackles; she polled the maximum ten coaches' votes and was selected in womens.afl's Team of the Week for that round. Marinoff was Adelaide's best player in its loss to the Western Bulldogs in round 6 and was selected in womens.afl's Team of the Week for that round. She was best afield with 24 disposals, 16 tackles and a goal in Adelaide's win over Greater Western Sydney in round 7; during the match, she became the first player in AFLW history to record 1,000 career disposals. Marinoff also received seven coaches' votes and was selected in womens.afl's Team of the Week for round 7. Marinoff was among Adelaide's best players in its round 8 win over Fremantle, polling the maximum ten coaches' votes, and was selected in womens.afl's Team of the Week for round 8. She was best afield in Adelaide's win over Collingwood in round 9, which was her 50th AFLW match; she also won eight coaches' votes and was selected in womens.afl's Team of the Week for that round. Marinoff was among Adelaide's best players in its win over St Kilda in round 10; she polled eight coaches' votes to finish fourth in that year's AFLW champion player of the year award, and was selected in womens.afl's Team of the Week for round 10. She was named in Champion Data's 2022 season 6 AFLW All-Star stats team after leading the competition for metres gained with 395.7 a game.

==== Season 7 ====
Marinoff had another strong season in 2022 season 7, finishing second in Adelaide's best and fairest and again being named in the All-Australian team.

=== 2023 ===
Leading into the 2023 season, Sarah Black named Marinoff at no. 3 on her annual list of the top 30 players in the AFLW. Marinoff was selected for her sixth All-Australian team at the conclusion of the 2023 season, tying her in second place for the most selections in the team. Despite Adelaide finishing first on the home-and-away ladder, they exited the premiership race in the preliminary finals for the second consecutive year. Marinoff collected her second Club Champion award following the season. She also signed a contract extension, keeping her at Adelaide until the end of 2027.

=== 2024 ===
Leading into the 2024 season, Marinoff and Sarah Allan were announced as Adelaide's new co-captains, replacing Chelsea Randall. In week 1, Marinoff won the Showdown Medal for best afield in the Showdown against Port Adelaide with 29 disposals and nine tackles, polling nine coaches' votes, and was among Adelaide's best players in its win over Fremantle in week 2, polling nine coaches' votes. She was named Adelaide's best player in its win over Hawthorn in week 3, its win over Essendon in week 4, its loss to Brisbane in week 5 and its win over St Kilda in week 6, polling six, nine, nine and a perfect ten coaches' votes respectively. Marinoff was again Adelaide's best player in its week 7 loss to Melbourne with 29 disposals and 17 tackles, becoming the first AFLW player to record 2,000 career disposals, and was best afield in its week 7 win over Greater Western Sydney with a career-high 41 disposals and 17 tackles; Marinoff's 19 votes across Adelaide's week 7 matches saw her lead the voting for the AFLCA AFLW champion player of the year award after the compressed period of the season, having averaged career-highs in disposals (31), clearances (6.8) and tackles (12.9) to that point, and she would go on to win the award with 91 votes, ahead of three-time winner Jasmine Garner on 79 votes.

== Statistics ==
Updated to the end of the 2025 season.

Legend
G	Goals	K	Kicks	D	Disposals	T	Tackles
B	Behinds	H	Handballs	M	Marks
#	Played in that season's premiership team	†	Led the league for the season	±	Won that season's AFLW B&F

Season	Team	No.	Games	Totals							Averages (per game)							Votes
Season	Team	No.	Games	G	B	K	H	D	M	T	G	B	K	H	D	M	T	Votes
2017^{#}	Adelaide	10	8	0	2	96	31	127	19	76^{†}	0.0	0.3	12.0	3.9	15.9	2.4	9.5^{†}	2
2018	Adelaide	10	7	0	2	81	28	109	14	82^{†}	0.0	0.3	11.6	4.0	15.6	2.0	11.7^{†}	6
2019^{#}	Adelaide	10	9	3	2	130^{†}	75	205^{†}	15	75	0.3	0.2	14.4	8.3	22.8^{†}	1.7	8.3	7
2020	Adelaide	10	6	0	0	94	45	139	31	47	0.0	0.0	15.7	7.5	23.2	5.2	7.8	2
2021	Adelaide	10	11	1	2	189^{†}	69	258	20	74	0.1	0.2	17.2^{†}	6.3	23.5	1.8	6.7	11
2022 (S6)^{#}	Adelaide	10	12	1	1	195^{†}	96	291	48	87	0.1	0.1	16.3	8.0	24.3	4.0	7.3	18
2022 (S7)	Adelaide	10	13	2	1	214^{†}	98	312^{†}	26	126	0.2	0.1	16.5^{†}	7.5	24.0	2.0	9.7	18
2023	Adelaide	10	13	4	2	268^{†}	90	358	51	135^{†}	0.3	0.2	20.6^{†}	6.9	27.5	3.9	10.4	11
2024	Adelaide	10	14	4	4	321^{†}	106	427^{†}	51	171^{†}	0.3	0.3	22.9^{†}	7.6	30.5^{†}	3.6	12.2^{†}	23^{±}
2025	Adelaide	10	14	2	2	263	125	388	50	153^{†}	0.1	0.1	18.8^{†}	8.9	27.7	3.6	10.9	6
Career			107	17	18	1852	763	2615	325	1026	0.2	0.2	17.3	7.1	24.4	3.0	9.6	104

== Honours and achievements ==
Team

- 3× AFL Women's premiership player (Adelaide): 2017, 2019, S6
- 3× AFL Women's minor premiership (Adelaide): 2021, S6, 2023

Representative

- Allies representative honours in AFL Women's State of Origin: 2017

Individual

- Adelaide co-captain: 2024–present
- AFL Women's best and fairest: 2024
- AFLPA AFLW most valuable player: 2024
- AFLCA AFLW champion player of the year: 2024
- Adelaide games record holder
- 7× AFL Women's All-Australian team: 2017, 2019, 2021, S6, S7, 2023, 2024
- 4× Adelaide Club Champion: 2021, 2023, 2024, 2025
- AFLPA AFLW best captain: 2024
- Showdown Medal: 2024
- AFL Women's Rising Star: 2017
