= 2022 AFL Women's season 6 All-Australian team =

- Date: 5 April 2022
- Venue: Crown Melbourne
- Hosted by: Sarah Jones

Television/radio coverage
- Network: Fox Footy

The 2022 AFL Women's season 6 All-Australian team represents the best-performed players of 2022 AFL Women's season 6. The team was announced on 5 April 2022 as a complete women's Australian rules football team of 21 players. The team is honorary and does not play any games.

== Selection panel ==
The selection panel for the 2022 AFL Women's season 6 All-Australian team consisted of chairwoman Nicole Livingstone, Andrew Dillon, Laura Kane, Brad Scott, Sam Virgo, Narelle Smith, Kelli Underwood, Sarah Black, Megan Waters and Tim Harrington.

== Initial squad ==
The initial 40-woman All-Australian squad was announced on 30 March. Melbourne had the most players selected in the initial squad with seven, with players from grand finalists Adelaide and Melbourne making up one-third of the squad, and every team had at least one representative. Eleven players from the 2021 team were among those selected.

Club	Total	Player(s)
Adelaide	6	Sarah Allan, Anne Hatchard, Eloise Jones, Ebony Marinoff, Erin Phillips, Ashleigh Woodland
Brisbane	4	Emily Bates, Greta Bodey, Nat Grider, Orla O'Dwyer
Carlton	3	Kerryn Harrington, Mimi Hill, Breann Moody
Collingwood	2	Jaimee Lambert, Ruby Schleicher
Fremantle	3	Ebony Antonio, Kiara Bowers, Hayley Miller
Geelong	2	Amy McDonald, Maddy McMahon
Gold Coast	1	Tara Bohanna
Greater Western Sydney	1	Cora Staunton
Melbourne	7	Libby Birch, Tyla Hanks, Tayla Harris, Shelley Heath, Kate Hore, Daisy Pearce, Lauren Pearce
North Melbourne	3	Jasmine Garner, Emma Kearney, Ash Riddell
Richmond	3	Katie Brennan, Monique Conti, Rebecca Miller
St Kilda	1	Tilly Lucas-Rodd
West Coast	1	Emma Swanson
Western Bulldogs	3	Ellie Blackburn, Kirsty Lamb, Bonnie Toogood

== Final team ==
The final team was announced on 5 April. Grand finalists Adelaide and Melbourne had the most selections with four, with nine teams represented overall. Five players achieved selection for the first time, while seven players from the 2021 team were selected, with North Melbourne captain Emma Kearney achieving selection for the sixth consecutive year. Kearney was announced as the All-Australian captain and Fremantle captain Hayley Miller was announced as the vice-captain.

2022 AFL Women's season 6 All-Australian team
B:	Ruby Schleicher (Collingwood)	Libby Birch (Melbourne)	
HB:	Sarah Allan (Adelaide)	Nat Grider (Brisbane)	Emma Kearney (North Melbourne) (captain)
C:	Orla O'Dwyer (Brisbane)	Emily Bates (Brisbane)	Anne Hatchard (Adelaide)
HF:	Hayley Miller (Fremantle) (vice-captain)	Katie Brennan (Richmond)	Daisy Pearce (Melbourne)
F:	Ashleigh Woodland (Adelaide)	Tayla Harris (Melbourne)	
Foll:	Lauren Pearce (Melbourne)	Ebony Marinoff (Adelaide)	Ash Riddell (North Melbourne)
Int:	Jasmine Garner (North Melbourne)	Jaimee Lambert (Collingwood)	Monique Conti (Richmond)
Int:	Kirsty Lamb (Western Bulldogs)	Kerryn Harrington (Carlton)	
Coach:	Matthew Clarke (Adelaide)		

Note: the position of coach in the AFL Women's All-Australian team is traditionally awarded to the coach of the premiership-winning team.
