= Adelaide Club Champion (AFL Women's) =

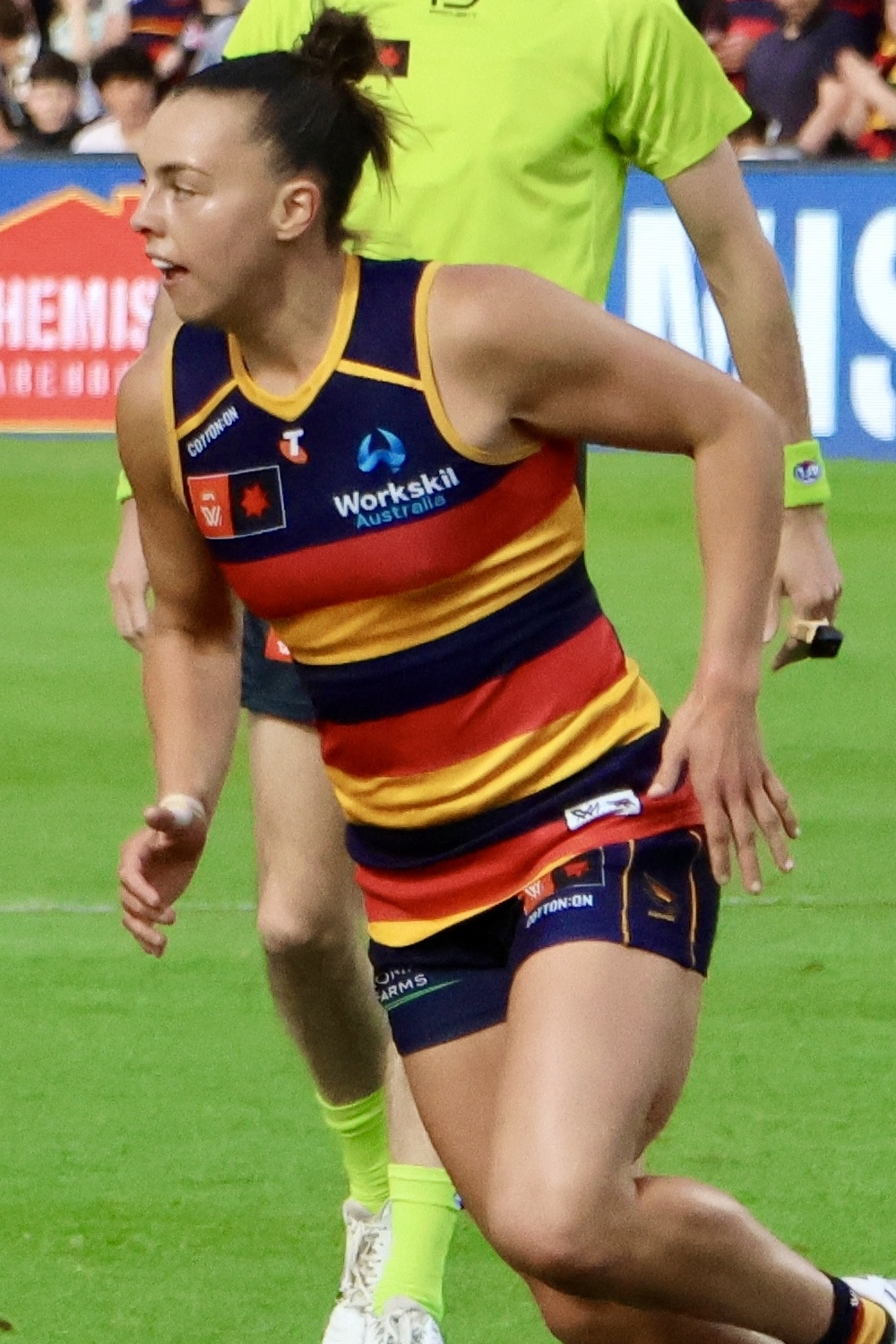
- Marinoff has won the award four times.
- Awarded for: The best and fairest player of the Adelaide Football Club in the AFL Women's
- Country: Australia
- Presented by: Adelaide Football Club

History
- First award: 2017
- First winner: Erin Phillips
- Most wins: Ebony Marinoff (4 times)
- Most recent: Ebony Marinoff (2025)

In the AFL Women's (AFLW), the Adelaide Club Champion award is awarded to the best and fairest player at the Adelaide Football Club during the home-and-away season. The award has been awarded annually since the competition's inaugural season in 2017, and Erin Phillips was the inaugural winner of the award.

Ebony Marinoff has received the award a record four times, also being the most recent recipient of the award, while Phillips has won twice and Anne Hatchard three times.

== Recipients ==
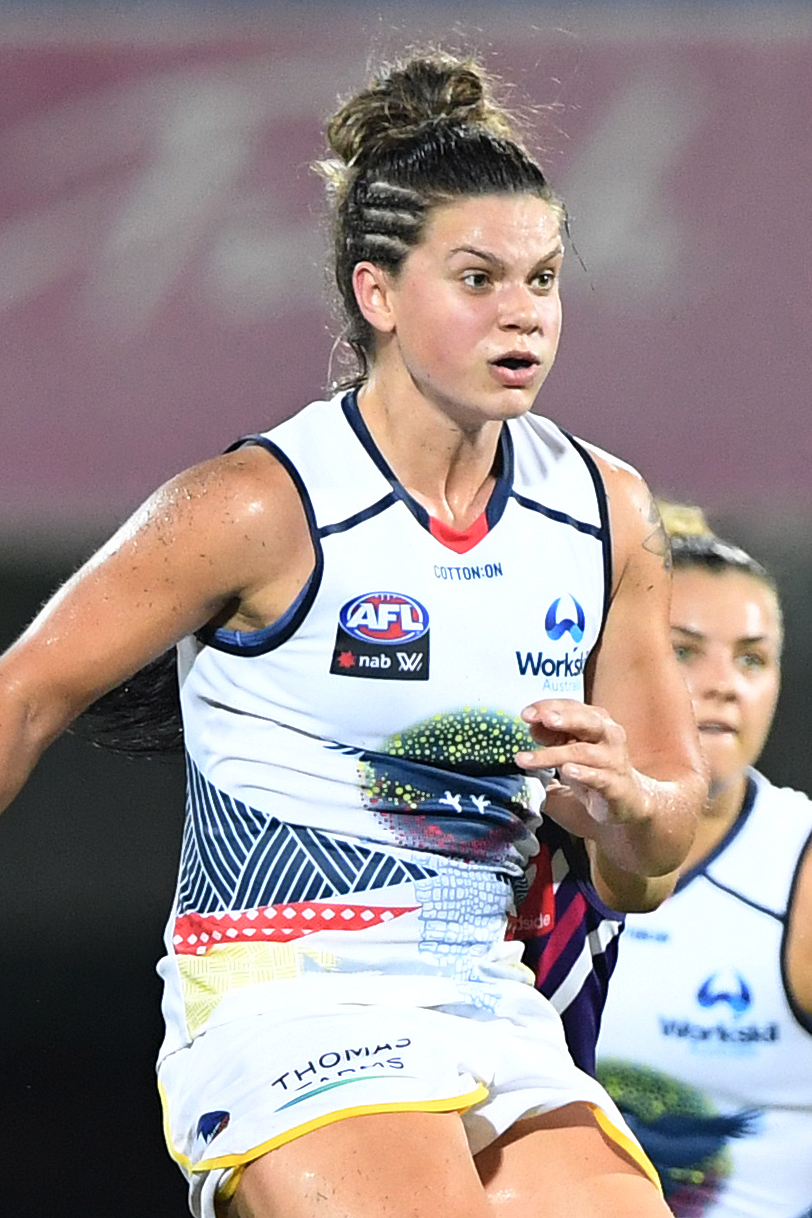
Anne Hatchard won the award on three occasions, including in a premiership year.

^	Denotes current player
+	Player won AFL Women's best and fairest in same season
#	Played in that season's premiership team

Season	Recipient(s)	Runner up	Second runner up	Ref.
2017#	Erin Phillips+	Chelsea Randall	Ebony Marinoff^	
2018	Chelsea Randall	Sarah Allan^	Ebony Marinoff^	
2019#	Erin Phillips+ (2)	Ange Foley	Anne Hatchard	
2020	Anne Hatchard	Ebony Marinoff^	Justine Mules	
2021	Ebony Marinoff^	Anne Hatchard	Erin Phillips	
2022^{(S6)}#	Anne Hatchard (2)	Ebony Marinoff^	Sarah Allan^	
2022^{(S7)}	Anne Hatchard (3)	Ebony Marinoff^	Chelsea Biddell^	
2023	Ebony Marinoff^ (2)	Anne Hatchard	Niamh Kelly^	
2024	Ebony Marinoff+^ (3)	Chelsea Randall	Anne Hatchard	
2025	Ebony Marinoff^ (4)	Chelsea Biddell^	Anne Hatchard	

== Multiple winners ==
^	Denotes current player

Player	Awards	Seasons
Ebony Marinoff^	4	2021, 2023, 2024, 2025
Anne Hatchard	3	2020, 2022^{(S6)}, 2022^{(S7)}
Erin Phillips	2	2017, 2019

== See also ==
- Malcolm Blight Medal (list of Adelaide Football Club best and fairest winners in the Australian Football League)
