= 2021 AFL Women's All-Australian team =

Award for the best-performed players of Australian rules football

- Date: 20 April 2021
- Venue: 2021 W Awards venues: Adelaide Oval; Crown Melbourne; The Gabba; Perth Stadium; Sydney Cricket Ground
- Hosted by: Sarah Jones

Television/radio coverage
- Network: Fox Footy

The 2021 AFL Women's All-Australian team represents the best-performed players of the 2021 AFL Women's season. The team was announced on 20 April 2021 as a complete women's Australian rules football team of 21 players. The team is honorary and does not play any games.

== Selection panel ==
The selection panel for the 2021 AFL Women's All-Australian team consisted of chairwoman Nicole Livingstone, Steve Hocking, Josh Vanderloo, Kelli Underwood, Sarah Black, Tim Harrington, Shelley Ware, Sharelle McMahon, Courtney Cramey and Melissa Hickey.

== Initial squad ==
The initial 40-woman All-Australian squad was announced on 31 March. Collingwood had the most players selected in the initial squad with six, and every team had at least one representative. Fifteen players from the 2020 team were among those selected.

Club	Total	Player(s)
Adelaide	4	Sarah Allan, Anne Hatchard, Ebony Marinoff, Erin Phillips
Brisbane	4	Sophie Conway, Dakota Davidson, Kate Lutkins, Cathy Svarc
Carlton	4	Kerryn Harrington, Breann Moody, Maddy Prespakis, Darcy Vescio
Collingwood	6	Brittany Bonnici, Brianna Davey, Jaimee Lambert, Stacey Livingstone, Chloe Molloy, Ruby Schleicher
Fremantle	3	Kiara Bowers, Janelle Cuthbertson, Gemma Houghton
Geelong	1	Meg McDonald
Gold Coast	1	Lauren Ahrens
Greater Western Sydney	1	Alyce Parker
Melbourne	4	Tyla Hanks, Kate Hore, Karen Paxman, Lauren Pearce
North Melbourne	4	Jasmine Garner, Emma Kearney, Emma King, Ash Riddell
Richmond	4	Katie Brennan, Monique Conti, Harriet Cordner, Ellie McKenzie
St Kilda	1	Georgia Patrikios
West Coast	1	Mikayla Bowen
Western Bulldogs	2	Ellie Blackburn, Isabel Huntington

== Final team ==
The final team was announced on 20 April. Collingwood had the most selections with four, and every team except Gold Coast and West Coast had at least one representative. Six players achieved selection for the first time, while seven players from the 2020 team were selected, two of whom – Melbourne vice-captain Karen Paxman and North Melbourne captain Emma Kearney – achieved selection for the fifth consecutive year. Collingwood co-captain Brianna Davey was announced as the All-Australian captain and Fremantle midfielder Kiara Bowers was announced as the vice-captain.

2021 AFL Women's All-Australian team
B:	Sarah Allan (Adelaide)	Meg McDonald (Geelong)	
HB:	Ruby Schleicher (Collingwood)	Kate Lutkins (Brisbane)	Janelle Cuthbertson (Fremantle)
C:	Monique Conti (Richmond)	Kiara Bowers (Fremantle) (vice-captain)	Georgia Patrikios (St Kilda)
HF:	Jasmine Garner (North Melbourne)	Katie Brennan (Richmond)	Ellie Blackburn (Western Bulldogs)
F:	Erin Phillips (Adelaide)	Chloe Molloy (Collingwood)	
Foll:	Breann Moody (Carlton)	Brianna Davey (Collingwood) (captain)	Alyce Parker (Greater Western Sydney)
Int:	Ebony Marinoff (Adelaide)	Darcy Vescio (Carlton)	Brittany Bonnici (Collingwood)
Int:	Karen Paxman (Melbourne)	Emma Kearney (North Melbourne)	
Coach:	Craig Starcevich (Brisbane)		

Note: the position of coach in the AFL Women's All-Australian team is traditionally awarded to the coach of the premiership-winning team.
