= Sarah Allan (footballer) =

Australian rules footballer

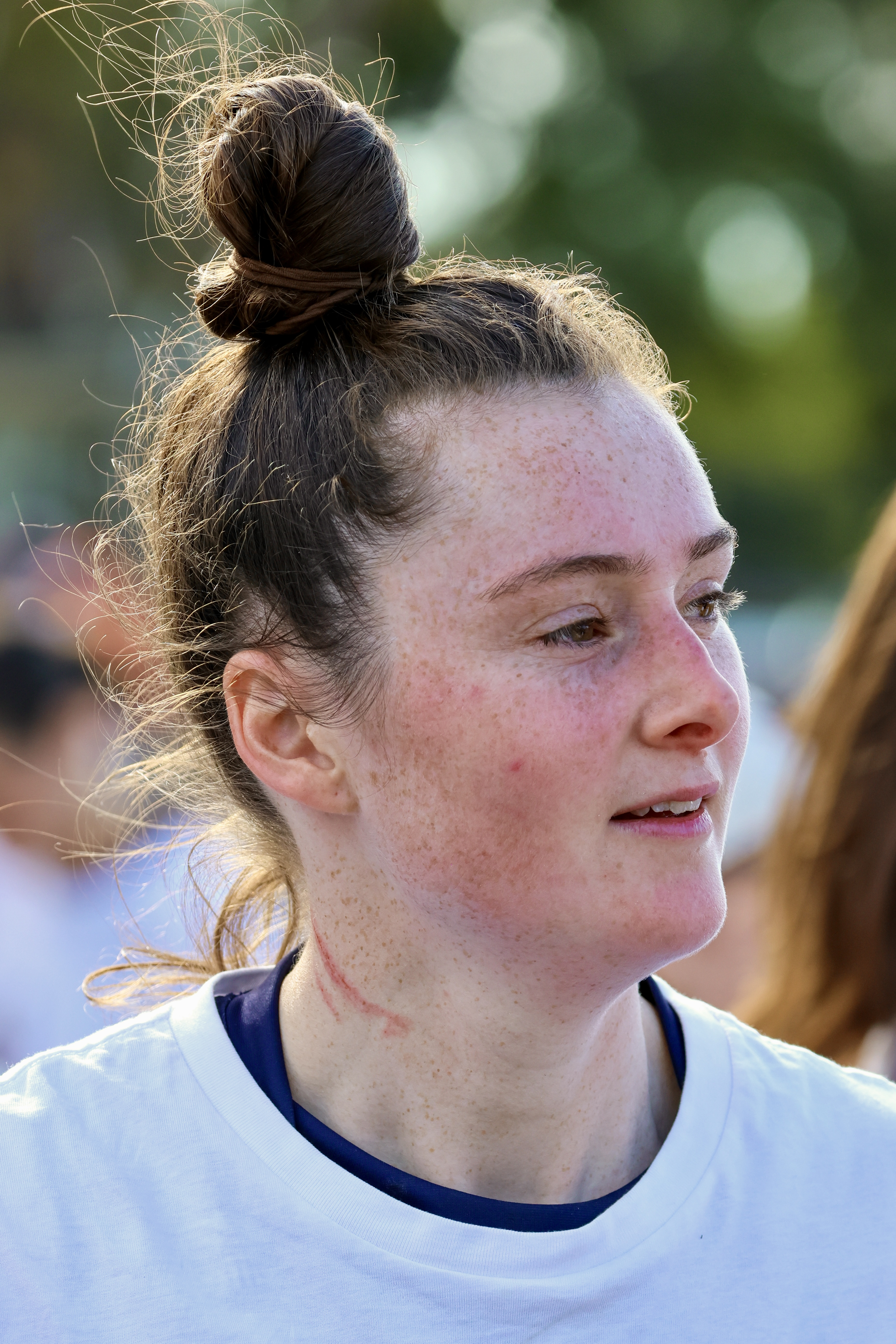
- Allan in 2026

Personal information
- Born: 19 November 1997 (age 28)
- Original team: Salisbury (SAWFL)
- Draft: No. 122, 2016 AFL Women's draft
- Debut: Round 1, 2017, Adelaide vs. Greater Western Sydney, at Thebarton Oval
- Height: 178 cm (5 ft 10 in)
- Position: Defender

Club information
- Current club: Adelaide
- Number: 39

Playing career^{1}
Years	Club	Games (Goals)
2017–	Adelaide	107 (0)
- ^{1} Playing statistics correct to the end of 2026.

Career highlights
- Adelaide co-captain: 2024–2025; 3× AFL Women's premiership player: 2017, 2019, 2022 (S6); 3× AFL Women's All-Australian team: 2020, 2021, 2022 (S6); AFL Women's Rising Star nominee: 2018

Sarah Allan (born 19 November 1997) is an Australian rules footballer playing for the Adelaide Football Club in the AFL Women's competition.

== Early life and career ==
Allan's father was Keith Allan, who played in the South Australian National Football League for Central District Football Club. She grew up in the south east of South Australia on the Limestone Coast, originally from Beachport but later moving to Millicent.

As a junior player, Allan was twice named in the Youth Girls All-Australian team. In 2016, when playing in the South Australian Women's Football League for Salisbury, she chose to wear the same number as her father, the number 39.

== AFLW career (2017–present) ==
Allan was drafted by Adelaide with their sixteenth selection and 122nd overall in the 2016 AFL Women's draft, and she kept her playing number 39 upon joining the club. She made her debut in the thirty-six point win against Greater Western Sydney at Thebarton Oval in the opening round of the 2017 season. She was omitted for the round two match against the Western Bulldogs at VU Whitten Oval, before returning for the round four match against Fremantle at Fremantle Oval. She was a part of Adelaide's premiership side after the club defeated Brisbane by six points at Metricon Stadium in the AFL Women's Grand Final. She missed two matches for the season to finish with six matches in her debut season.

Adelaide signed Allan for the 2018 season during the trade period in May 2017. During the 2017 draft, Allan's younger sister Jessica Allan joined the team, and the Allans became the second pair of sisters in the AFLW (after Sarah and Jess Hosking from Carlton).

After floating around the ground in 2017, Allan began to settle in her position as a key defender in 2018, regularly tagging opposition teams' best tall forward in matches, and she received a nomination for the 2018 AFL Women's Rising Star award after recording eleven disposals and four rebound 50s in Adelaide's round 6 win against Fremantle. Playing all seven matches for the season she was also nominated for the All-Australian team, as well as being second in the Crows' Club Champion award, was one of only four players in the team to receive maximum votes in a single game and was named the team's best defensive player.

The 2020 AFL Women's season saw Allan obtain her first AFL Women's All-Australian team selection, named in the full back position. In the 2021 AFL Women's season, Allan was awarded with her second All-Australian blazer, again named on the full back position. In her sixth season, Allan won her third All-Australian honour and her third premiership when Adelaide defeated Melbourne in the Grand Final. She also finished third in Adelaide's Club Champion award.

In 2024 and 2025, Allan took on the club captaincy, sharing the position with Ebony Marinoff. After two seasons, Allan stepped down from the role, allowing Marinoff to be the sole captain of the Crows. As of September 2026, Allan is yet to kick a goal in the AFLW from her 107 appearances, making her the most experienced player not to kick a goal.

At the conclusion of the 2026 AFL Women's season, Allan requested a trade to the Gold Coast Suns.

== Player profile ==
Allan is a versatile key-position player capable of playing in the forward line, in defence or in the ruck.

== Statistics ==
Statistics are correct to round 4, 2026

Legend
G	Goals	K	Kicks	D	Disposals	T	Tackles
B	Behinds	H	Handballs	M	Marks
#	Played in that season's premiership team

Season	Team	No.	Games	Totals							Averages (per game)							Votes
Season	Team	No.	Games	G	B	K	H	D	M	T	G	B	K	H	D	M	T	Votes
2017^{#}	Adelaide	39	6	0	1	19	20	39	9	9	0.0	0.1	3.2	3.3	6.5	1.5	1.5	0
2018	Adelaide	39	7	0	0	51	12	63	8	14	0.0	0.0	7.3	1.7	9.0	1.1	2.0	0
2019^{#}	Adelaide	39	9	0	0	54	29	83	20	13	0.0	0.0	6.0	3.2	9.2	2.2	1.4	1
2020	Adelaide	39	6	0	0	51	24	75	21	11	0.0	0.0	8.5	4.0	12.5	3.5	1.8	0
2021	Adelaide	39	11	0	0	85	53	138	23	13	0.0	0.0	7.7	4.8	12.5	2.1	1.2	0
2022 (S6)^{#}	Adelaide	39	12	0	1	84	50	134	24	24	0.0	0.1	7.0	4.2	11.2	2.0	2.0	0
2022 (S7)	Adelaide	39	13	0	0	64	45	109	23	32	0.0	0.0	4.9	3.5	8.4	1.8	2.5	0
2023	Adelaide	39	5	0	0	20	17	37	9	12	0.0	0.0	4.0	3.4	7.4	1.8	2.4	0
2024	Adelaide	39	14	0	0	57	63	120	25	53	0.0	0.0	4.1	4.5	8.6	1.8	3.8	0
2025	Adelaide	39	12	0	1	71	67	138	33	31	0.0	0.1	5.9	5.6	11.5	2.8	2.6	0
2026	Adelaide	39	4	0	0	29	12	41	8	15	0.0	0.0	7.3	3.0	10.3	2.0	3.8	0
Career			99	0	3	585	392	977	203	227	0.0	0.0	5.9	4.0	9.9	2.1	2.3	1

== Honours and achievements ==
Team

- 3× AFL Women's premiership player (Adelaide): 2017, 2019, S6
- 3× AFL Women's minor premiership (Adelaide): 2021, S6, 2023

Individual

- Adelaide co-captain: 2024–2025
- 3× AFL Women's All-Australian team: 2020, 2021, S6
- AFL Women's Rising Star nominee: 2018
