= Richmond best and fairest (AFL Women's) =

- Awarded for: The best and fairest player of the Richmond Football Club in the AFL Women's
- Country: Australia
- Presented by: Richmond Football Club
- First award: 2020
- Currently held by: Monique Conti

In the AFL Women's (AFLW), the Richmond best and fairest award is awarded to the best and fairest player at the Richmond Football Club during the home-and-away season. The award has been awarded annually since the club's inaugural season in the competition in 2020, and Monique Conti was the inaugural winner of the award.

== Recipients ==
**Bold**	Denotes current player
	Player won AFL Women's best and fairest in same season

Season	Recipient(s)	Ref.
2020	**Monique Conti**	
2021	**Monique Conti** (2)	
2022 (S6)	**Monique Conti** (3)	
2022 (S7)	**Monique Conti** (4)	
2023	**Monique Conti** (5)	
2024	**Monique Conti** (6)	
2025	**Monique Conti** (7)	

== See also ==
- Jack Dyer Medal (list of Richmond Football Club best and fairest winners in the Australian Football League)
