= 2019 AFL Women's best and fairest =

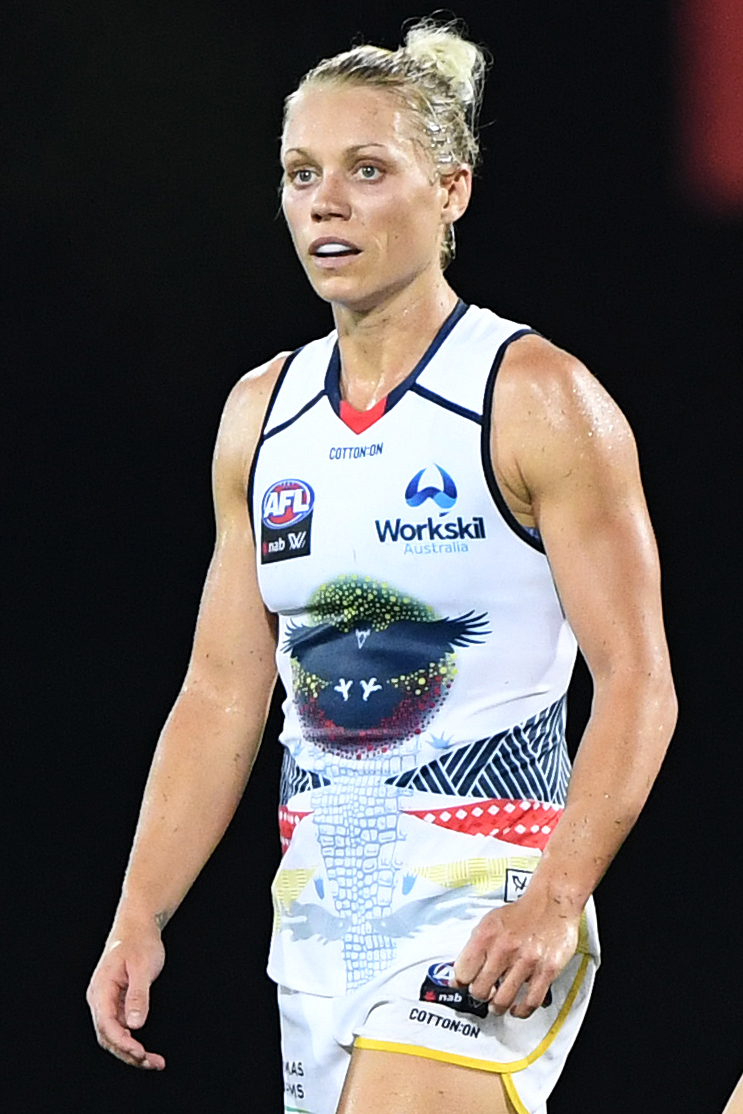
- 2019 AFL Women's best and fairest winner Erin Phillips
- Date: 2 April
- Location: Docklands Stadium
- Hosted by: Neroli Meadows
- Winner(s): Erin Phillips; Adelaide (19 votes)

Television/radio coverage
- Network: Fox Footy

The 2019 AFL Women's best and fairest was the award presented to the player adjudged the best and fairest player during the 2019 AFL Women's season. Erin Phillips of the Adelaide Football Club won the award for the second time, winning with 19 votes.

== Leading votegetters ==
Placing	Player	Votes
1st	Erin Phillips (Adelaide)	19
2nd	Dana Hooker (Fremantle)	11
3rd	Karen Paxman (Melbourne)	10
=4th	Kiara Bowers (Fremantle)	7
=4th	Monique Conti (Western Bulldogs)	7
=4th	Emma King (North Melbourne)	7
=4th	Ebony Marinoff (Adelaide)	7
=8th	Ellie Blackburn (Western Bulldogs)	6
=8th	Jenna Bruton (North Melbourne)	6
=8th	Cora Staunton (Greater Western Sydney)	6

== Voting procedure ==
The three field umpires (the umpires who control the flow of the game, as opposed to goal or boundary umpires) confer after each match and award three votes, two votes and one vote to the players they regard as the best, second-best and third-best in the match, respectively. The votes are kept secret until the awards night, and are read and tallied on the evening.
