= John Kilpatrick (footballer) =

Australian rules footballer (1938–2025)

Personal information
- Full name: John Thomas Kilpatrick
- Born: 20 November 1938
- Died: 14 September 2025 (aged 86)
- Original team: Irymple
- Height: 183 cm (6 ft 0 in)
- Weight: 80 kg (176 lb)

Playing career
Years	Club	Games (Goals)
1960	St Kilda	2 (0)

John Thomas Kilpatrick (20 November 1938 – 14 September 2025) was an Australian rules footballer who played with St Kilda in the Victorian Football League (VFL).

Kilpatrick was later the Team Trainer for the VFL club, Hawthorn and was pictured in the famous 1989 VFL Grand Final between Hawthorn and Geelong with Dermott Brereton. He died on 14 September 2025, at the age of 86.
