= Greg Baum =

Australian sportswriter

Gregory Martin Baum (born 14 December 1959) is a former Australian sports journalist.

== Early years and education ==
Baum was born in Melbourne, Victoria, the first of six children to Martin and Joan Baum. He attended Boronia State Primary school, then St Josephs Primary School Boronia. He then attended St Joseph's Regional College, Ferntree Gully, graduating in 1976. He enrolled in the Royal Melbourne Institute of Technology (RMIT) journalism course and began work as a cadet with Leader Newspapers on the local paper, the Knox-Sherbrooke News, in 1977.

== Journalism career ==
After a number of his articles on the local football competition were republished in The Sun, a major newspaper in Melbourne, Baum was offered a job by that newspaper, becoming a sub-editor at the age of 20. He ultimately became a full-time sportswriter for the paper, including ghosting a column for former footballer Lou Richards.

In May 1989 he was offered a job by Fairfax Publications at The Age, the Sun's main rival. Baum has continued to write for The Age until his retiring in January 2025. He was a Senior Sports Writer, and an Associate Editor as well as writing for The Guardian of London. He also edited the last Australian edition of Wisden. In the course of his work, Baum travelled to many countries including America, Canada, India, Pakistan Italy, Germany, Brazil, South Africa and England whilst covering Olympics, soccer and cricket. He has received a number of awards for his work, from the Melbourne Cricket Ground Trust, the Victorian Boxing Association and the Australian Press Association. He also received a 2008 Walkley Award in the "Commentary, analysis, opinion, and critique" category. He is the author of several books on sporting personalities including Paul Reiffel and Steve Waugh, and was the ghost writer of Dangerous Days, an account of the wartime adventures of Private Laurie Brough. He has three children and three grandchildren. He lives in Skene's Creek and Melbourne.
