= Barry Gavin =

Australian rules footballer

Personal information
- Full name: Barry Gavin
- Born: 20 August 1944 (age 82)
- Died: 8 May 2017
- Original team: Hamilton Imperials
- Height: 188 cm (6 ft 2 in)
- Weight: 86 kg (190 lb)

Playing career^{1}
| Years | Club | Games (Goals) |
| 1965–1966 | North Melbourne | 6 (2) |
- ^{1} Playing statistics correct to the end of 1966.

Barry Gavin (20 August 1944 – 8 May 2017) was an Australian rules footballer who played for the North Melbourne Football Club in the Victorian Football League (VFL).

== Playing career ==
Barry Gavin debuted for North Melbourne at age 20 and he played six games from 1965-1966. He was the 578th player to represent North Melbourne where he kicked two goals wearing the numbers 42 and 54.

== Post career ==
Barry Gavin worked as a physiotherapist at the Hawthorn Football Club and was instrumental during their golden era during the 70s and 80s. Barry was associated with the Hawthorn Football Club for over 30 years after joining the club as assistant physio in 1972 under Harry Miller. Barry was appointed chief physio in 1975 and played an integral part in the performance and rehabilitation of players during his time at the club. He was recognised for his efforts in 1990 when he was rewarded with life membership at the Hawthorn Football Club. Barry Gavin also worked as chief physio at the Melbourne Storm Rugby League Club.

== Personal life ==
Barry Gavin married Di Gavin and they had three children; Sam, Eliza and Amy. He developed his own successful physio business called 'Total Physio Care' with three clinics throughout Melbourne. He died in 2017.
