= Kirsty Lamb =

Australian rules footballer

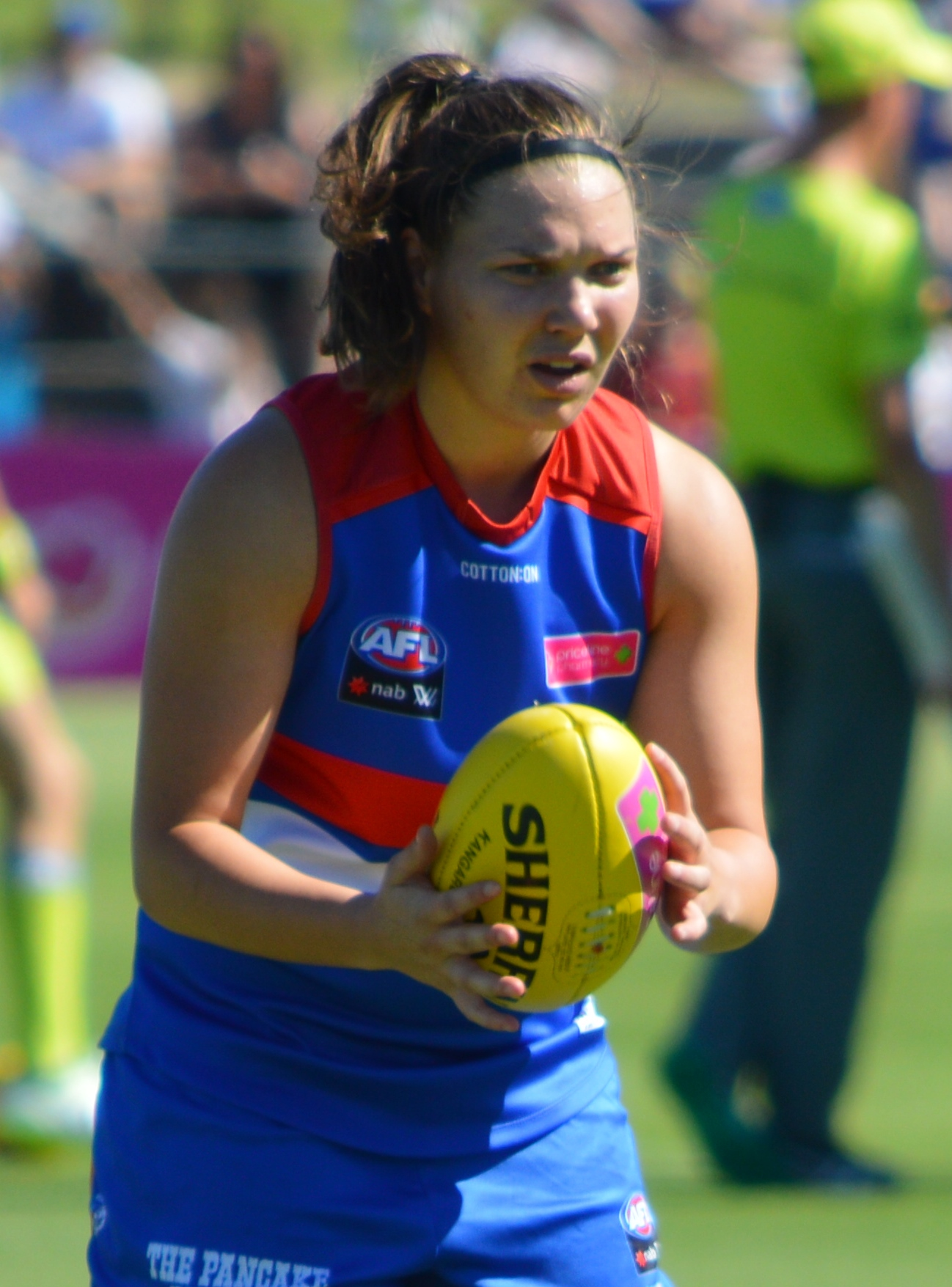
- Lamb playing Australian rules football for the Western Bulldogs in February 2018
- Born: 27 June 1994 (age 32)
- Height: 162 cm (5 ft 4 in)
Australian rules football career
Personal information
- Original team: Diamond Creek (VFL Women's)
- Draft: No. 138, 2016 AFL Women's draft
- Debut: Round 1, 2017, Western Bulldogs vs. Fremantle, at VU Whitten Oval
- Position: Midfielder
Club information
- Current club: Port Adelaide
Playing career^{1}
Years	Club	Games (Goals)
2017–2023	Western Bulldogs	67 (25)
2024–	Port Adelaide	0 (0)
Total		67 (25)
- ^{1} Playing statistics correct to the end of the 2023 season.
Career highlights
- AFLW premiership player: 2018; AFL Women's All-Australian team: 2022 (S6); Western Bulldogs best and fairest: 2022 (S6); AFLPA Most Courageous Player: 2022 (S6); VWFL premiership player: 2012; Lisa Hardeman Medal: 2012
- Cricket career

Cricket information
- Batting: Right-handed
- Bowling: Left-arm medium

Domestic team information
- Years: Team
- 2012/13–2015/16: Victorian Spirit
- 2015/16: Melbourne Renegades
- 2016: Staffordshire

Career statistics
Competition	List A	Twenty20
Matches	17	20
Runs scored	74	72
Batting average	9.25	14.40
100s/50s	0/0	0/0
Top score	24*	29*
Balls bowled	425	205
Wickets	7	6
Bowling average	59.00	40.66
5 wickets in innings	0	0
10 wickets in match	0	0
Best bowling	2/33	3/20
Catches/stumpings	1/–	3/–
- Source: CricketArchive, 7 February 2018

Kirsty Maree Lamb (born 27 June 1994) is an Australian rules footballer playing for Port Adelaide in the AFL Women's (AFLW) competition. She has previously played for the Western Bulldogs Lamb previously played cricket for Victoria in the Women's National Cricket League (WNCL) and for the Melbourne Renegades in the Women's Big Bash League (WBBL).

== Cricket ==
An all-rounder bowling left-arm medium pace and batting right-handed, Lamb was appointed captain of Victorian Premier Cricket club Plenty Valley at age 19. She began playing for Victoria in 2012–13, appearing in six Women's National Cricket League (WNCL) matches that season and winning the team's Rookie of the Year Award. Lamb signed with the Melbourne Renegades for the inaugural Women's Big Bash League season, playing a total of eight matches.

Despite not having played for Victoria and the Renegades since the 2015–16 season, Lamb has remained involved in the administrative side of the sport through her position as an events coordinator at the Australian Cricketers' Association.

== Australian rules football ==
=== VWFL/VFLW ===
After moving from Yarrambat Junior Football Club in 2009, Lamb played over 150 games for Diamond Creek Women's Football Club. In 2012, she was a major contributor to Diamond Creek's maiden Victorian Women's Football League (VWFL) premiership, winning the Lisa Hardeman Medal (awarded to the player adjudged best afield) in a five-point Grand Final defeat of Darebin at Box Hill City Oval.

Lamb went on to appear in the 2014 VWFL Grand Final with Diamond Creek at Coburg City Oval, kicking two goals in a 30-point loss to Darebin. In the VFL Women's (VFLW) competition, the successor league to the VWFL, Lamb and Diamond Creek reached the 2017 Grand Final at Docklands Stadium, though her team would again suffer defeat at the hands of Darebin.

=== AFLW ===
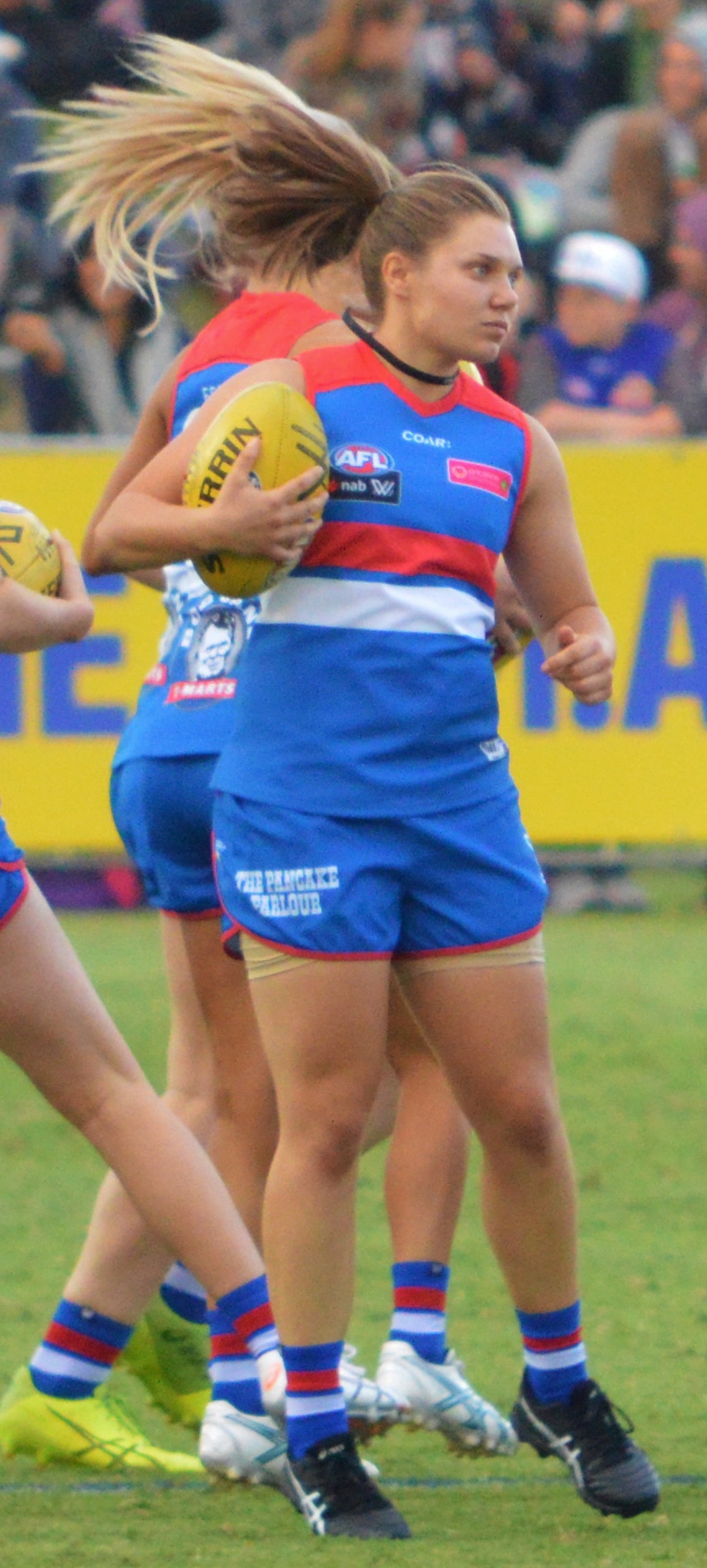
Lamb with the Western Bulldogs during the 2017 AFLW season

Lamb was drafted by the Western Bulldogs with their 18th selection and 138th overall in the 2016 AFL Women's draft. She made her debut in the 32-point win against Fremantle at VU Whitten Oval in the opening round of the 2017 season. Following the match, she accepted a one-game suspension by pleading guilty to engaging in rough conduct against Akec Makur Chuot.

In 2018, Lamb was an integral member of the Western Bulldogs' premiership team, playing every game of the season and finishing third in the club's best and fairest count. She collected 12 disposals and laid eight tackles in the six-point Grand Final victory against Brisbane at Ikon Park.

Lamb had a strong 2021 season, finishing as runner-up in the Western Bulldogs' best and fairest count. In a six-point round two victory against Carlton at VU Whitten Oval, she recorded 16 disposals, eight tackles and a career-first vote in the league's best and fairest count. On 16 June 2021, it was revealed that Lamb had signed a contract extension with the club after playing every game possible for the club that season.

2022 season 6 proved to be a breakout season for Lamb, with the "tough midfielder" earning selection in the All-Australian team and winning the AFLPA Most Courageous Player award. She also tied for first place with Ellie Blackburn in the Western Bulldogs' best and fairest count, finished fifth in the AFL Coaches' Champion Player award, and ended the league's best and fairest count in equal-13th position with nine votes. Despite reports of "significant interest" from St Kilda in April 2022, Lamb rejected offers to switch clubs and ultimately re-committed with the Western Bulldogs for another season.

Ahead of the 2024 AFL Women's season, Lamb was traded to Port Adelaide as part of an 11-club trade.

=== Statistics ===
Statistics are correct to the end of 2022 season 6.

Legend
G	Goals	K	Kicks	D	Disposals	T	Tackles
B	Behinds	H	Handballs	M	Marks
#	Played in that season's premiership team

Season	Team	No.	Games	Totals							Averages (per game)							Votes
Season	Team	No.	Games	G	B	K	H	D	M	T	G	B	K	H	D	M	T	Votes
2017	Western Bulldogs	27	6	4	0	47	15	62	6	20	0.7	0.0	7.8	2.5	10.3	1.0	3.3	0
2018^{#}	Western Bulldogs	27	8	0	2	75	27	102	16	43	0.0	0.3	9.4	3.4	12.8	2.0	5.4	0
2019	Western Bulldogs	27	7	0	2	73	25	98	24	43	0.0	0.3	10.4	3.6	14.0	3.4	6.1	0
2020	Western Bulldogs	27	6	3	3	56	26	82	19	26	0.5	0.5	9.3	4.3	13.6	3.2	4.3	0
2021	Western Bulldogs	27	9	2	3	103	59	162	37	54	0.2	0.3	11.4	6.6	18.0	4.1	6.0	5
2022 (S6)	Western Bulldogs	27	10	6	3	119	68	187	27	34	0.6	0.3	11.9	6.8	18.7	2.7	3.4	9
Career			46	15	13	473	220	693	129	220	0.3	0.3	10.3	4.8	15.1	2.8	4.8	14
