= Monique Conti =

Australian rules footballer and basketball player

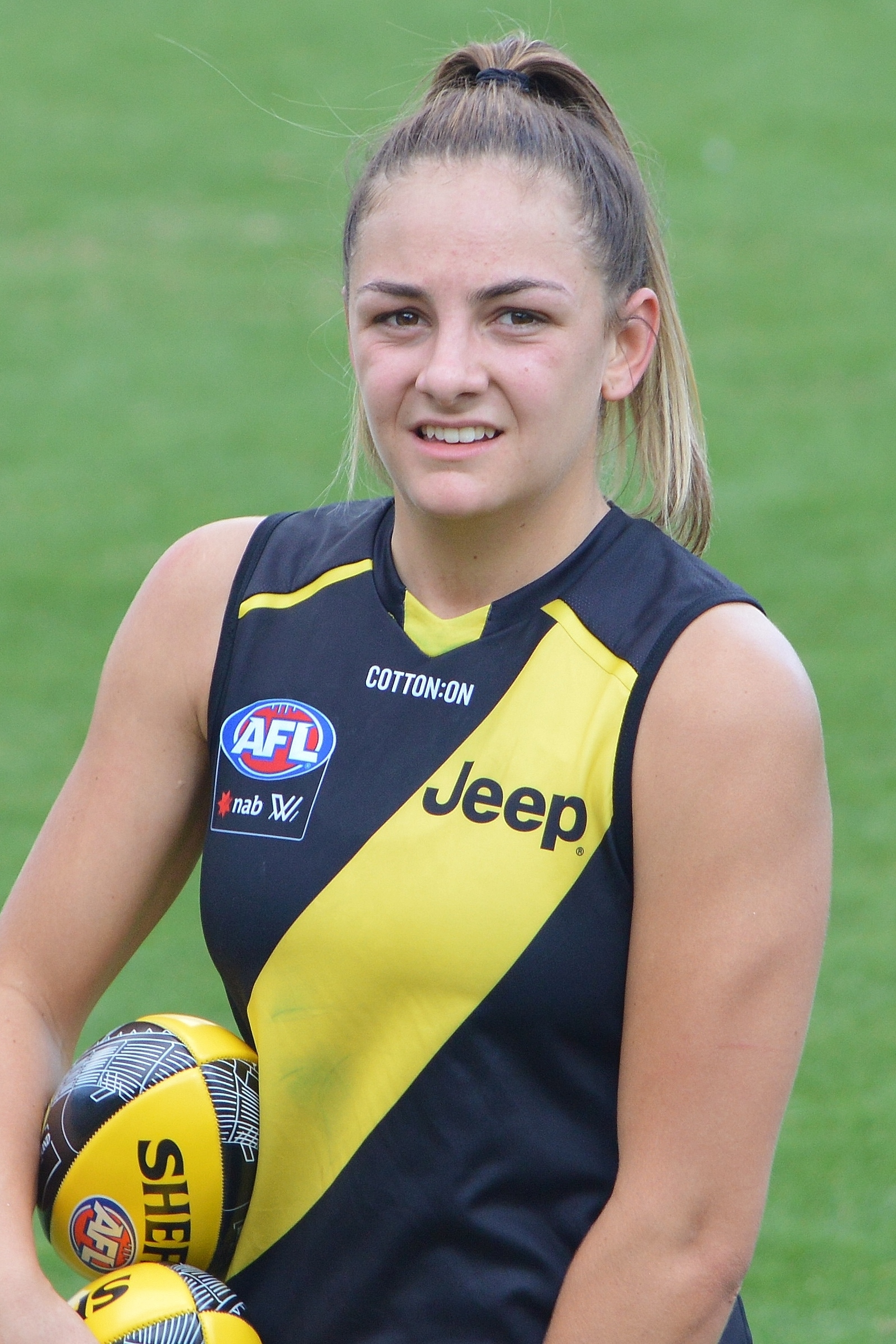
- Conti post-match with Richmond in 2020

Personal information
- Full name: Monique Conti
- Born: 9 December 1999 (age 26); Fitzroy, Victoria
- Original team: Melbourne University (VFLW)
- Draft: No. 4, 2017 national draft
- Debut: Round 1, 2018, Western Bulldogs vs. Fremantle, at VU Whitten Oval
- Height: 165 cm (5 ft 5 in)
- Position: Midfielder

Club information
- Current club: Richmond
- Number: 4

Playing career^{1}
Years	Club	Games (Goals)
2018–2019	Western Bulldogs	15 (4)
2020–	Richmond	70 (19)
Total		85 (23)
- ^{1} Playing statistics correct to the end of the 2025 season.

Career highlights
- AFL Women's premiership player: 2018; AFL Women's grand final best-on-ground: 2018; AFL Women's best and fairest: 2023; AFLPA AFLW most valuable player: S7; Richmond games record holder; 5× AFL Women's All-Australian team: 2019, 2021, S6, S7, 2023; Western Bulldogs best and fairest: 2019; 7× Richmond best and fairest: 2020–2025; AFL Women's Rising Star nominee: 2018

Monique Pauline Conti (born 9 December 1999) is an Australian sportswoman who plays Australian rules football and basketball. Conti currently plays for the Richmond Football Club in the AFL Women's (AFLW), having previously played for the Western Bulldogs from 2018 to 2019. She also played in the Women's National Basketball League (WNBL) between 2016 and 2025.

As an Australian rules footballer, Conti received a nomination for the 2018 AFL Women's Rising Star award in round 4 of the 2018 season and went on to win an AFL Women's premiership with the Bulldogs that season, and was adjudged best afield in the grand final. She was also selected in the 2019 AFL Women's All-Australian team and won the Western Bulldogs best and fairest award in 2019 before moving to Richmond at the end of the season. At Richmond, Conti won the AFL Women's best and fairest award in 2023 and the AFLPA AFLW most valuable player award in season 7, along with the inaugural seven Richmond best and fairest awards in her first six seasons at the club and four consecutive AFL Women's All-Australian selections from 2021 to 2023. She is also Richmond's games record holder with 70 games.

As a basketballer, Conti was a member of the Australian team that won the gold medal at the 2016 FIBA Under-17 World Championship for Women and was named in that year's All-Tournament Team. She also won the WNBL Rookie of the Year Award in her first WNBL season with the Melbourne Boomers in 2017, before moving to the Southside Flyers in 2020 and winning a WNBL championship. After a second season with the Flyers in 2022–23, she returned to the Boomers in 2023.

== Early life ==
Conti was born in Fitzroy, Victoria. She studied at Maribyrnong College in her secondary school years, and looked up to other Australian dual-sport athletes such as Ellyse Perry and fellow footballer/basketballer and AFL Women's player Erin Phillips.

Conti started playing football from the age of ten, playing with boys at the Essendon Doutta Stars Football Club until the age of 14 and then in the Melbourne University under-18 youth girls team until the age of 17, making the Vic Metro and All-Australian teams in all three years playing at that level. In September 2016, Conti was one of 15 players from around Australia selected in level 2 of the inaugural AFL Women's academy. Conti played for the Calder Cannons in the TAC Cup Girls in 2017 alongside current AFL Women's players such as AFL Women's Rising Star winners Chloe Molloy and Maddy Prespakis, and was coached by current player Alicia Eva. Earlier in the year, at a testing day prior to the five-round season, she ranked first among TAC Cup Girls players in both the 20-metre sprint and agility test. Conti also played for Melbourne University in the VFL Women's (VFLW) in 2017 before being drafted.

Conti started playing basketball from the age of five, playing with the Melbourne Tigers for the entirety of her junior basketball years and in the South East Australian Basketball League (SEABL) in 2017 and 2018. Prior to the creation of the AFL Women's, Conti had aspirations to play college basketball in the United States from a young age, and received offers from over thirty schools to play there at the age of 16, but instead committed to studying at Deakin University, which was aligned with the Melbourne Boomers, allowing her to continue her studies and to continue playing basketball at national level, along with football. She began studying a business degree there in 2018 while also part of its Elite Athlete program.

== Basketball career ==
Monique Conti
Career information
- Playing career: 2015–present
- Position: Guard

Career history
- 2015–2019: Melbourne Tigers
- 2016–2020: Melbourne Boomers
- 2020: Southside Flyers
- 2021: Melbourne Tigers
- 2022: Casey Cavaliers
- 2022–2023: Southside Flyers
- 2023–2024: Melbourne Boomers
- 2024–2025: Geelong United

Career highlights
- WNBL champion (2020); WNBL Rookie of the Year (2017)
Medals
Representing Australia
Basketball
FIBA Under-17 World Championship for Women
Gold medal – first place	2016 Spain	Team

=== National team ===
Conti made her junior international debut at the 2016 U17 World Championship in Spain with the Australian Sapphires, helping the team win the gold medal. Alongside two of her teammates, Conti was named to the All-Tournament Team. She went on to compete at the 2016 FIBA Oceania U18 Championship, where she won another gold medal, and then at the 2017 FIBA U19 World Cup.

=== WNBL ===
==== Melbourne Boomers ====
Conti began her professional career with the Melbourne Boomers in the Women's National Basketball League (WNBL) in the 2016–17 season, where she remained through 2019–20 season. Prior to the 2019–20 finals, Conti sought a release from her contract over conflicts between her basketball and football commitments. The release allowed her to play from the opening round of the AFLW season, but saw her give up the final year of her Boomers contract.

In June 2023, Conti re-joined the Boomers for the 2023–24 WNBL season.

==== Southside Flyers ====
Conti joined the Southside Flyers for the 2020 WNBL Hub season in Queensland, with the condensed fixture in place as a result of the COVID-19 pandemic allowing Conti to complete the full commitments of both the WNBL and AFL Women's seasons. She helped the Flyers win the championship. She did not return for the 2021–22 season after choosing to focus solely on her AFL Women's career.

Conti returned to the Flyers for the 2022–23 season.

==== Geelong United ====
In August 2024, Conti signed with Geelong United for the 2024–25 WNBL season.

=== State Leagues ===
Conti played for the Melbourne Tigers in the Big V in 2015 and 2016. She continued with the Tigers in the South East Australian Basketball League (SEABL) in 2017 and 2018 and also in 2019 in the first season of the NBL1. She returned to the Tigers for the 2021 NBL1 South season.

In 2022, Conti played for the Casey Cavaliers in the NBL1 South, but was unable to finish the club's inaugural season in the competition after again choosing to prioritise football, with AFL Women's season seven beginning in August.

== AFL Women's career ==
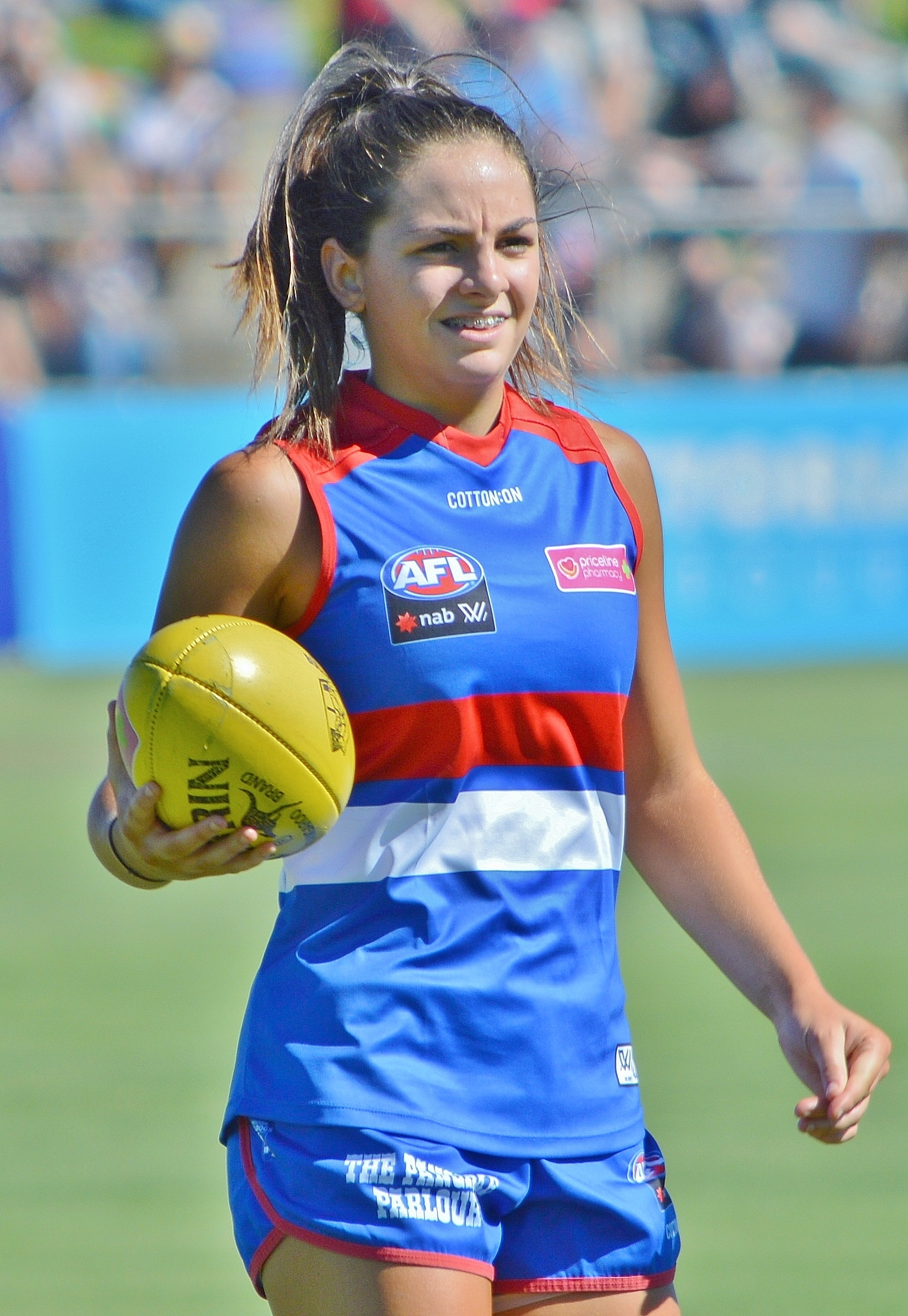
Conti playing for the Western Bulldogs in 2018

=== Western Bulldogs (2018–2019) ===
Conti was drafted by the Western Bulldogs with the club's second selection and fourth overall in the 2017 AFL Women's draft. She made her debut in the twenty-six point win against Fremantle in round 1, 2018 at VU Whitten Oval. In round 4, Conti received a nomination for the 2018 AFL Women's Rising Star award after recording 16 disposals in her side's win over Carlton, and went on to finish second in the voting for the award with 39 votes, 11 behind winner Chloe Molloy. She was also selected in afl.com.au's Team of the Week in rounds 3 and 5. Conti was a member of the Western Bulldogs team that won the AFL Women's premiership in 2018, defeating Brisbane by six points at Ikon Park, and won the medal for best-on-ground in the grand final. She was also named in the initial 2018 AFL Women's All-Australian 40-woman squad. The Western Bulldogs signed Conti for the 2019 season during the trade and signing period in May 2018.

Conti improved on her debut season in 2019, achieving selection in womens.afl's Team of the Week in round 7 after recording a then-career-high 25 disposals in the Bulldogs' loss to Carlton at VU Whitten Oval and finishing equal-fourth in the 2019 AFL Women's best and fairest count with seven votes. She was also named in the 2019 AFL Women's All-Australian team and won the Western Bulldogs best and fairest award.

=== Richmond (2020–present) ===
In April 2019, Conti was traded to Richmond for the first selection in the 2019 AFL Women's draft and began playing for the club's VFL Women's team the following month. Conti went on to win the club's VFLW best and fairest award and finish second in voting for the Lambert–Pearce Medal, despite only playing seven games. By December, Conti was expected to miss up to the first five games of Richmond's inaugural season in the AFLW due to the 2020 WNBL Finals clashing with the opening rounds of the 2020 AFL Women's season; however, in January 2020, Conti announced that she had requested to be released from her Melbourne Boomers contract to focus on playing in Richmond's inaugural AFLW season.

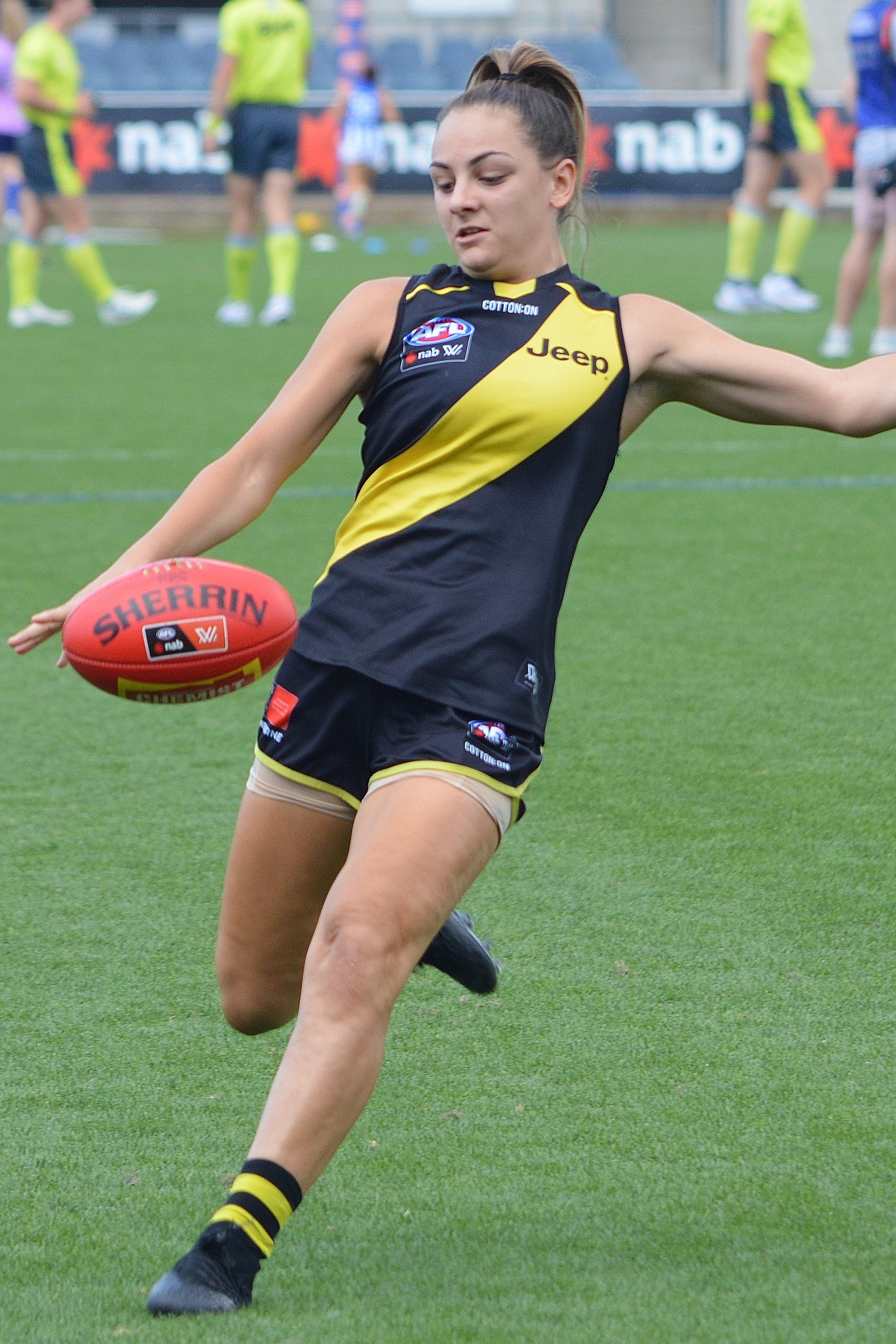
Conti playing for Richmond in 2020

Leading into the 2020 season, womens.afl journalist Sarah Black named Conti at no. 13 on her list of the top 30 players in the AFLW. She made her Richmond debut in the club's inaugural game against Carlton at Ikon Park, and was named among Richmond's best players. Conti was named among Richmond's best players in all six matches, averaging a career-high 19.8 disposals per game, and was selected in womens.afl's Team of the Week in round 4; in the round 4 match, Conti recorded five tackles and a career-high 28 disposals in the loss to Geelong. She went on to be selected in the initial 40-woman squad for the 2020 AFL Women's All-Australian team. Conti was also selected in the AFL Players Association's inaugural AFL Women's 22under22 team, having earlier been selected in the retrospective 2017–2019 team, and won the inaugural Richmond best and fairest award.

Leading into the 2021 season, Sarah Black again named Conti at no. 13 on her annual list of the top 30 players in the AFLW. Conti was among the club's best players in round 1 and was named Richmond's best player in the following four matches. She best afield in the round 4 loss to Carlton and Richmond's inaugural AFLW win against Geelong in round 5, and was selected in womens.afl's Team of the Week for those same rounds. Conti pulled up sore from the round 5 match, and was a late withdrawal the following week with hamstring soreness; she was among the best afield with 25 disposals and seven tackles upon her return in Richmond's round 7 win against Gold Coast. At the conclusion of the season, Conti was selected in the 2021 AFL Women's All-Australian team. Conti also achieved selection in Champion Data's 2021 AFLW All-Star stats team after leading the league for average ground-ball gets in the 2021 season, totalling 10.6 a game, a league record to that point.

Conti focused solely on the upcoming AFL Women's season leading into 2022, completing a full pre-season for the first time after her WNBL commitments prevented her from doing so in previous years. She was named at no. 10 in Sarah Black's 2022 season 6 list of the top 30 players in the AFLW, which was Conti's first appearance in the top ten. Conti was best afield with a career-high 29 disposals and nine clearances in Richmond's round 1 win against St Kilda, with Geelong AFL midfielder and Brownlow Medallist Patrick Dangerfield tweeting during the match that she could win that season's AFL Women's best and fairest award playing at that level if Richmond won enough games; she also won the maximum ten coaches' votes and was named in womens.afl's Team of the Week. Conti was named among Richmond's best players in round 2 with 25 disposals and her first goal for Richmond in its loss to Melbourne; she polled eight coaches' votes, the equal-most for the match and was also selected in womens.afl's Team of the Week for that round. She was named Richmond's best player in its loss to Fremantle in round 3 and was the only Richmond player to poll coaches' votes, with six. Despite being heavily tagged, Conti was named among Richmond's best players in its loss to Gold Coast in round 4 with a team-high 21 disposals and game-high ten tackles, and was Richmond's best player in its loss to the Western Bulldogs in round 5, polling five coaches' votes. She was also Richmond's best player in its loss to North Melbourne in round 6 and was best afield with 24 disposals, nine tackles and a goal in Richmond's win over West Coast in round 7. Conti also received the maximum ten coaches' votes and was selected in womens.afl's Team of the Week for round 7. Conti was Richmond's best player in its last three matches of the season, polling the maximum ten coaches' votes in round 9. Conti was named in Champion Data's 2022 season 6 AFLW All-Star stats team after leading the competition for contested possessions with 15.2 a game.

Leading into the 2023 season, Sarah Black named Conti at no. 1 on her annual list of the top 30 players in the AFLW.

In 2024, Conti was named Richmond's best player in its loss to West Coast in round 1 and was among Richmond's best players in wins over Greater Western Sydney in round 2 and Sydney in round 3. She was best afield in Richmond's win over Carlton in week 4, which was her 50th game for Richmond, with a game-high 32 disposals and ten clearances.

== Statistics ==
Updated to the end of the 2025 season.

Legend
G	Goals	K	Kicks	D	Disposals	T	Tackles
B	Behinds	H	Handballs	M	Marks
#	Played in that season's premiership team	†	Led the league for the season	±	Won that season's AFLW B&F

Season	Team	No.	Games	Totals							Averages (per game)							Votes
Season	Team	No.	Games	G	B	K	H	D	M	T	G	B	K	H	D	M	T	Votes
2018^{#}	Western Bulldogs	8	8	3	3	71	39	110	23	14	0.4	0.4	8.9	4.9	13.8	2.9	1.8	0
2019	Western Bulldogs	8	7	1	3	73	53	126	20	31	0.1	0.4	10.4	7.6	18.0	2.9	4.4	7
2020	Richmond	4	6	0	2	61	58	119	16	29	0.0	0.3	10.2	9.7	19.8	2.7	4.8	7
2021	Richmond	4	8	0	2	86	92	178	14	25	0.0	0.3	10.8	11.5^{†}	22.3	1.8	3.1	12
2022 (S6)	Richmond	4	10	2	3	117	122	239	16	59	0.2	0.3	11.7	12.2	23.9	1.6	5.9	11
2022 (S7)	Richmond	4	12	9	8	123	130	253	22	73	0.8	0.7	10.3	10.8	21.1	1.8	6.1	19
2023	Richmond	4	10	4	5	159	126	285	29	58	0.4	0.5	15.9	12.6	28.5	2.9	5.8	23^{±}
2024	Richmond	4	12	2	9	156	150	306	24	78	0.2	0.8	13.0	12.5	25.5	2.0	6.5	17
2025	Richmond	4	12	2	4	172	144	316	23	86	0.2	0.3	14.3	12.0	26.3	1.9	7.2	9
Career			85	23	39	1018	914	1932	187	453	0.3	0.5	12.0	10.8	22.7	2.2	5.3	105

== Honours and achievements ==
Team

- AFL Women's premiership player (Western Bulldogs): 2018
- AFL Women's minor premiership (Western Bulldogs): 2018

Individual

- AFL Women's grand final best-on-ground: 2018
- AFL Women's best and fairest: 2023
- AFLPA AFLW most valuable player: S7
- Richmond games record holder
- 5× AFL Women's All-Australian team: 2019, 2021, S6, S7, 2023
- Western Bulldogs best and fairest: 2019
- 7× Richmond best and fairest: 2020, 2021, S6, S7, 2023, 2024, 2025
- AFL Women's Rising Star nominee: 2018

== Personal life ==
As of September 2025, Conti is currently in a relationship with Rhyan Mansell who plays for Richmond's AFL Men's team. She previously dated Sydney Stack, another former Tigers player. In March 2026, Conti starred in the reality TV show Rivals: Sport vs. Sport representing "Team Aussie Rules".
