= Chelsea Randall =

Australian rules footballer

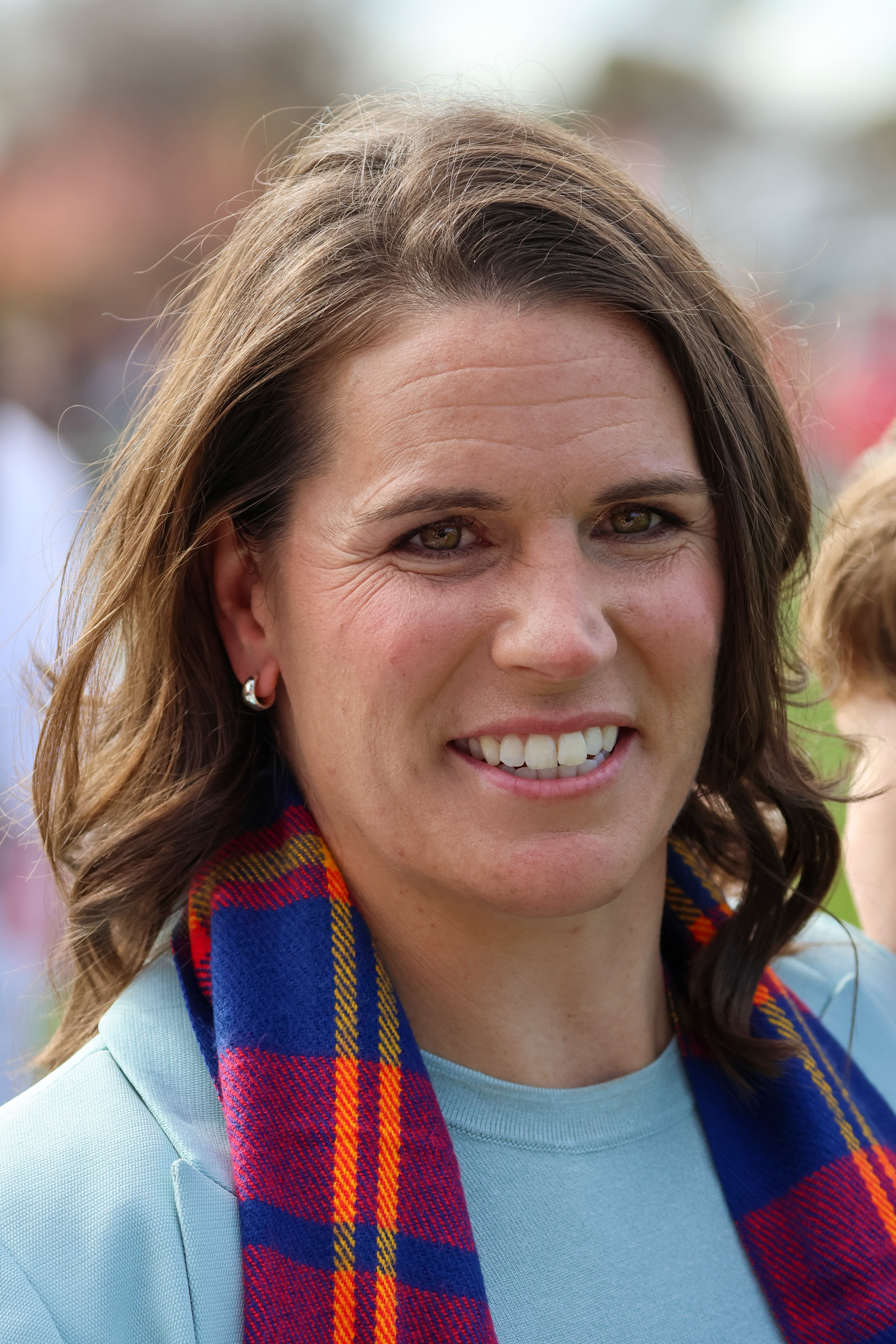
- Randall in 2026

Personal information
- Full name: Chelsea Rose Elizabeth Randall
- Born: 14 June 1991 (age 35)
- Original team: Swan Districts (WAWFL)
- Draft: 2016 marquee signing
- Debut: Round 1, 2017, Adelaide vs. Greater Western Sydney, at Thebarton Oval
- Height: 173 cm (5 ft 8 in)
- Position: Midfielder

Playing career
Years	Club	Games (Goals)
2017–2025	Adelaide	80 (38)

Representative team honours
Years	Team	Games (Goals)
2017	The Allies	1 (0)

Career highlights
- 3× AFL Women's premiership player: 2017 (c), 2019 (c), S6 (c); AFLCA AFLW champion player of the year: 2018; Adelaide co-captain: 2017–2020; captain 2021–2023; 5× AFL Women's All-Australian team: 2017, 2018 (c), 2019, S7, 2024; Adelaide Club Champion: 2018; 6× AFLPA AFLW most courageous player: 2017, 2018, 2019, 2021, S7, 2024; Showdown Medal: S7

Chelsea Rose Elizabeth Randall (born 14 June 1991) is a former Australian rules footballer who played for the Adelaide Football Club in the AFL Women's (AFLW). Randall was an inaugural Adelaide co-captain, sharing the role with Erin Phillips for four seasons before serving as sole captain for another four seasons, and captained Adelaide to three AFL Women's premierships in that time.

Randall had a career-best season in 2018, sharing the inaugural AFLCA AFLW champion player of the year award with Emma Kearney and winning the Adelaide Club Champion award. She was selected in five AFL Women's All-Australian teams (including as captain in 2018), captained the Allies in the inaugural AFL Women's State of Origin match in 2017 and won the inaugural Showdown Medal in season 7.

Noted as a courageous player, Randall won six AFLPA AFLW most courageous player awards between 2017 and 2024; however, as a result, she suffered from several concussions throughout her career, including in a preliminary final in 2021, which ruled her out of playing in the 2021 AFL Women's Grand Final. She ultimately retired due to concussion-related issues prior to the 2026 season.

== Early life and state league football ==
Randall began playing football in the boys under-11 side at the Safety Bay Stingers.

Randall has played state league football with Swan Districts in the West Australian Women's Football League (WAFL) since 2008. She is a two-time winner of the WAWFL best and fairest award.

Randall is a three-time All-Australian and has represented Western Australia at four national championships. Her first selection came at the age of 15. In 2013, she captained the state's side at that year's championships.

In 2011, she was selected as one of eight players to participate the AIS/AFL women's academy.

Randall was drafted to the Melbourne side for the 2013 women's AFL exhibition series with the third overall pick. In 2014, she was returned to Melbourne's side and was named best on ground in the series' second exhibition match of that year. She recorded fourteen marks and two goals in the match. Randall continued to play for the side through to the end of the 2016 exhibition series. In 2016, she also played matches for West Coast in the same exhibition series.

== AFL Women's career ==
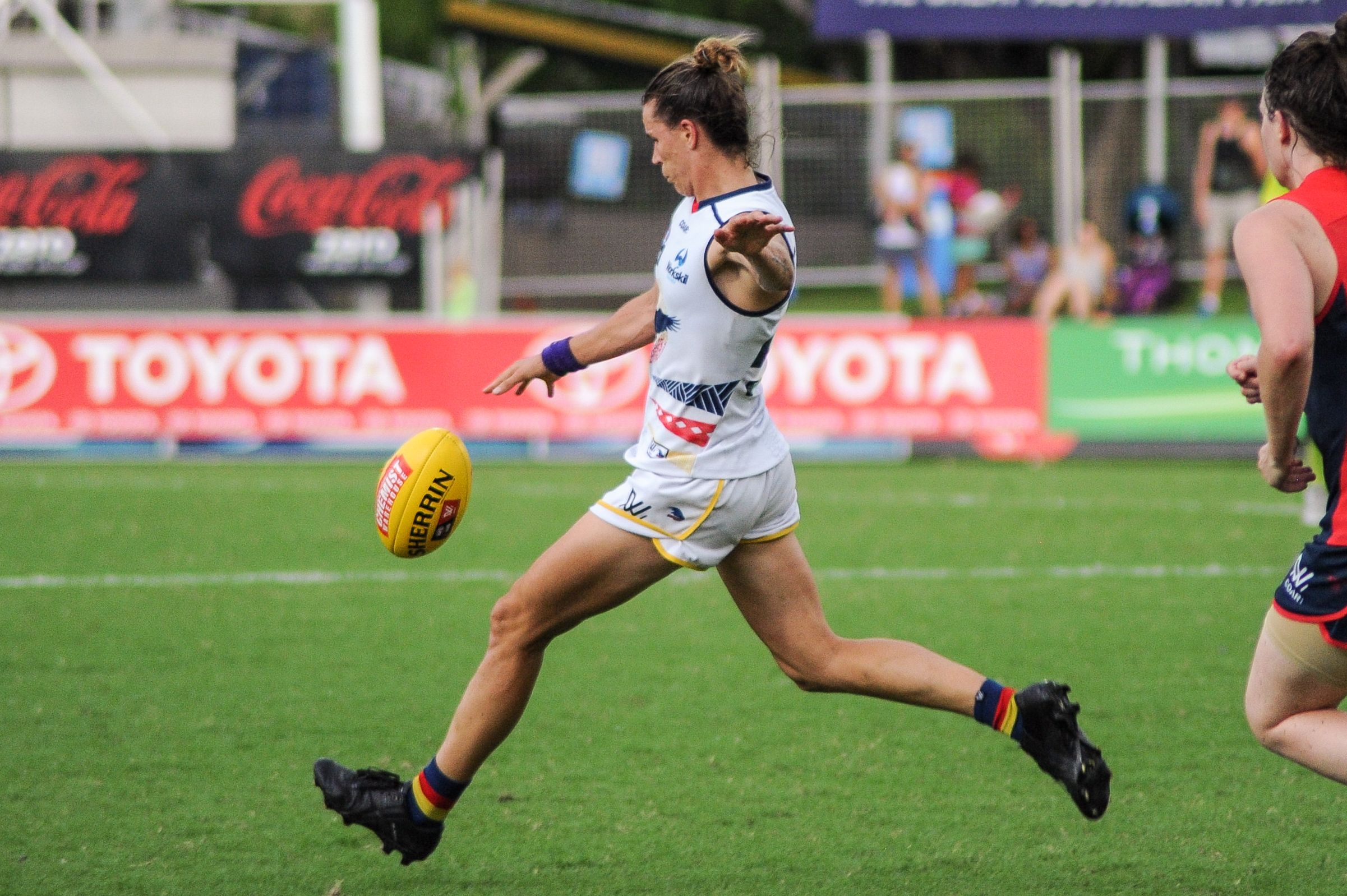
Randall kicking during the round 6, 2017 match against Melbourne.

Randall was one of two marquee player signings announced by Adelaide in anticipation of the league's first season in 2017. She was named the club's inaugural AFL Women's captain in January 2017. Randall was nominated by her teammates for the AFLW Players’ Most Valuable Player Award, and was listed in the All-Australian team.

Randall won the 2017 AFLW Players' Most Courageous Award.

On 18 May 2017, Adelaide signed Randall for the 2018 AFLW season.

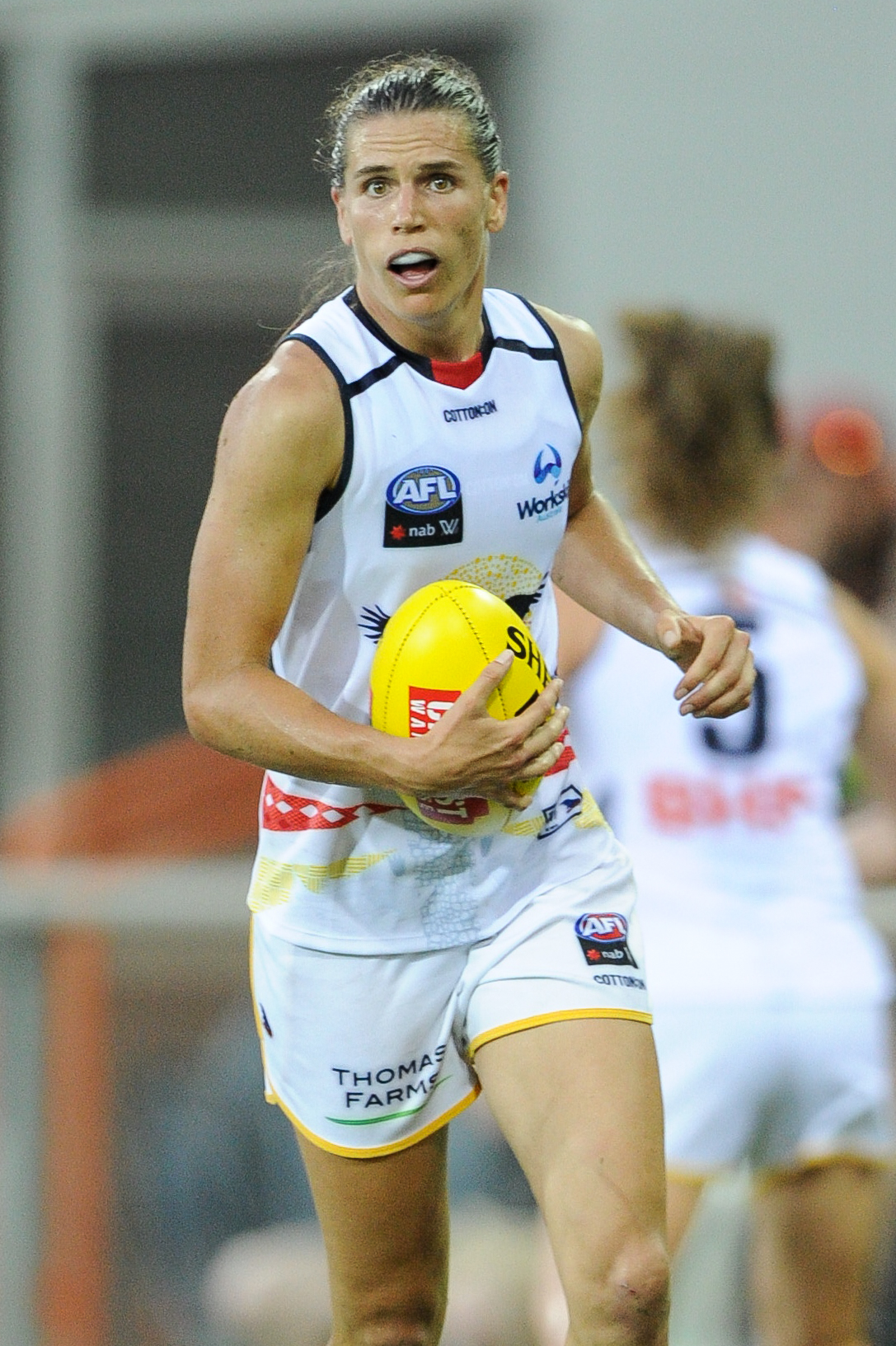
Randall during a pre-season practice match for Adelaide in 2018

Randall had another successful season in 2018, and was named the Crows' club champion, receiving 162 of a possible 168 votes over the season and scoring a maximum 24 votes in four of seven matches. She also won the AFLW Players' Most Courageous Award again, and was named captain of the 2018 AFL Women's All-Australian team. Randall again co-captained the side in the 2019 season, where she had another superb year, winning a second premiership and also being named for the third year running in the AFLW All-Australian team.

Randall suffered a serious injury to her knee at the start of the 2020 pre-season, ruling her out of the entire 2020 AFLW season. After her co-captain Erin Phillips relinquished her share of the captaincy, Randall was appointed sole captain of the Crows ahead of the 2021 season. It was revealed Randall had re-signed with Adelaide for two more years on 8 June 2021. She missed the 2021 Grand Final due to AFL concussion protocols.

Randall retired from AFLW in June 2026 for concussion-related reasons.

== Statistics ==
Statistics are correct to the end of 2024.

Legend
G	Goals	K	Kicks	D	Disposals	T	Tackles
B	Behinds	H	Handballs	M	Marks
#	Played in that season's premiership team

Chelsea Randall AFLW statistics
Season	Team	No.	Games	Totals							Averages (per game)							Votes
Season	Team	No.	Games	G	B	K	H	D	M	T	G	B	K	H	D	M	T	Votes
2017^{#}	Adelaide	26	8	2	2	85	28	113	24	39	0.3	0.3	10.6	3.5	14.1	3.0	4.9	4
2018	Adelaide	26	7	1	0	85	29	114	22	34	0.1	0.0	12.1	4.1	16.3	3.1	4.9	6
2019^{#}	Adelaide	26	8	1	1	72	51	123	28	17	0.1	0.1	9.0	6.4	15.4	3.5	2.1	4
2020	Adelaide	26	0	–	–	–	–	–	–	–	–	–	–	–	–	–	–	0
2021	Adelaide	26	9	6	2	68	43	111	25	22	0.7	0.2	7.6	4.8	12.3	2.8	2.4	3
2022 (S6)^{#}	Adelaide	26	6	0	0	43	10	53	16	8	0	0	7.2	1.7	8.8	2.7	1.3	0
2022 (S7)	Adelaide	26	10	8	6	112	63	175	34	44	0.8	0.6	11.2	6.3	17.5	3.4	4.4	5
2023	Adelaide	26	12	4	7	88	69	157	37	45	0.3	0.6	7.3	5.8	13.1	3.1	3.8	2
2024	Adelaide	26	14	10	6	138	84	222	56	60	0.7	0.6	9.9	6.0	15.6	4.0	4.3	1
Career			74	32	24	692	377	1069	243	270	0.4	0.3	9.4	5.1	14.1	3.3	3.6	25

== Personal life ==
Off the field, Randall works at the Adelaide Football Club as a community programs officer. In addition to her work, Randall is studying to become a physical education teacher.

In 2015 and 2016, Randall lived and worked in the remote mining town of Newman in the Pilbara region of Western Australia. She regularly completed a thirteen-hour drive in order to play for Swan Districts in the WAWFL.

In 2020, Randall competed on The Amazing Race Australia 5 with Marijana Rajčić as a "stowaway team". In post-show interviews, the two revealed that they had started dating before filming began. The pair announced their engagement on 5 March 2023 and the birth of their son on 29 October 2023.
