= Anne Hatchard =

Australian rules footballer

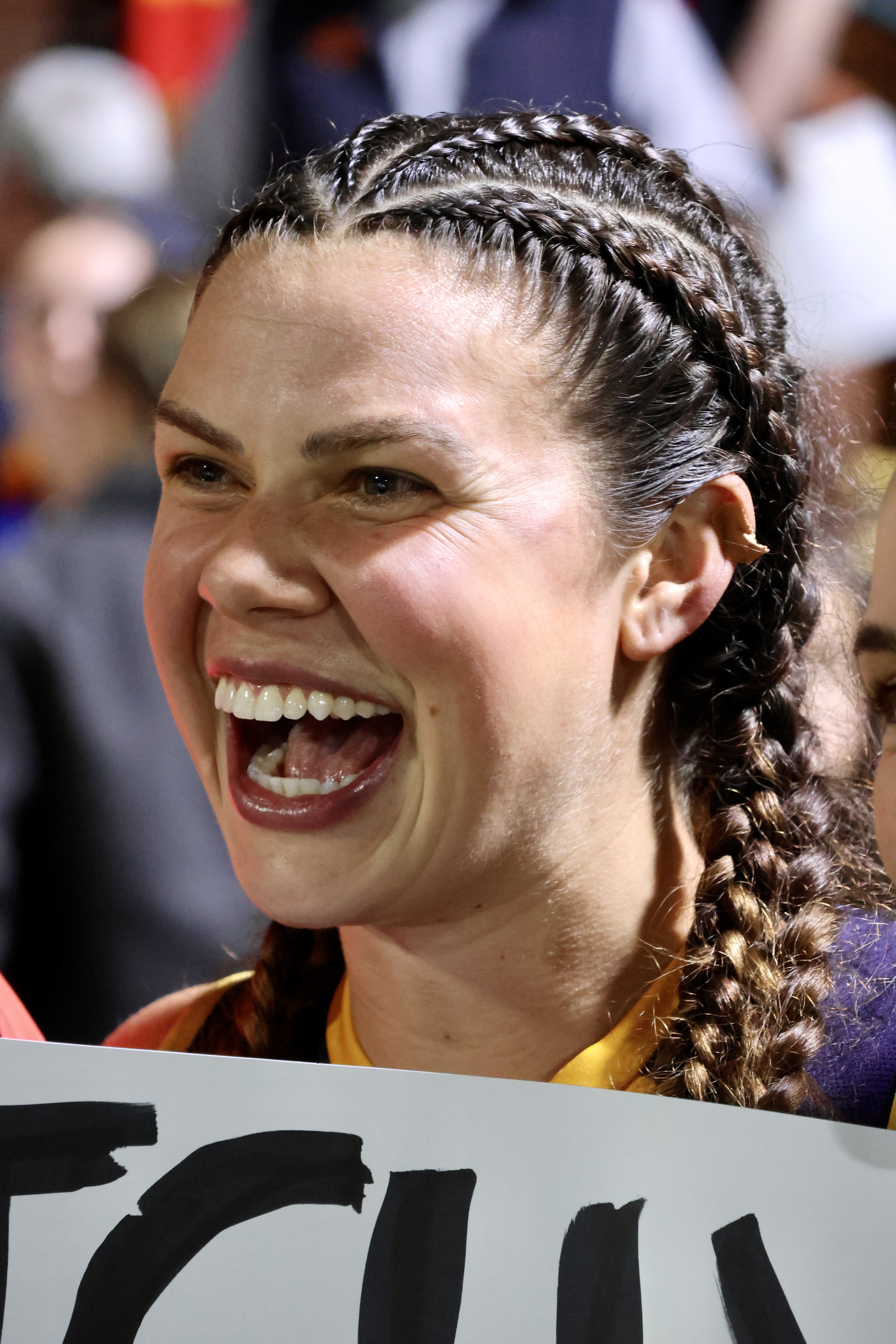
- Hatchard playing for Adelaide in 2025

Personal information
- Full name: Anne Claire Hatchard
- Born: March 7, 1998 (age 28); Australia
- Original team: Morphettville Park (SAWFL)
- Draft: No. 87, 2016 AFL Women's draft
- Debut: Round 1, 2017, Adelaide vs. Greater Western Sydney, at Thebarton Oval
- Height: 175 cm (5 ft 9 in)
- Position: Midfielder

Club information
- Current club: Gold Coast
- Number: 34

Playing career^{1}
Years	Club	Games (Goals)
2017–2025	Adelaide	102 (40)
2026–	Gold Coast	0 (0)
- ^{1} Playing statistics correct to the end of the 2023 season.

Career highlights
- 3× AFL Women's premiership player: 2017, 2019, 2022 (S6); AFL Women's Grand Final Best on Ground: 2022 (S6); AFL Women's Rising Star nominee: 2018; 4× AFL Women's All-Australian team: 2019, 2020, 2022 (S6), 2022 (S7); 3× Adelaide Crows AFLW Club Champion: 2020, 2022 (S6), 2022 (S7)

Anne Claire Hatchard (born March 7, 1998) is an Australian rules footballer playing for the Gold Coast Suns in the AFL Women's competition. She has previously played for Adelaide.

== AFL Women's career ==
Hatchard was drafted by Adelaide with their eleventh selection and eighty-seventh overall in the 2016 AFL Women's draft. She made her debut in the thirty-six point win against Greater Western Sydney at Thebarton Oval in the opening round of the 2017 season. She missed the round four match against Fremantle at Fremantle Oval when she was omitted from the side. She returned the next week for the three point loss to Brisbane at Norwood Oval. She was a part of Adelaide's premiership side which defeated Brisbane by six points at Metricon Stadium in the AFL Women's Grand Final. She missed one match during the season to finish with seven matches in her debut season.

Adelaide signed Hatchard for the 2018 season during the trade period in May 2017. She received a nomination for the Rising Star award in Adelaide's round 7 loss to Collingwood.

Hatchard enjoyed a breakout year in 2019, showing an increased ability to compete in the midfield largely as a result of improved fitness. She attributed this development to a change in diet, specifically cutting down on fast food. Overcoming concussion concerns ahead of a thumping 66-point preliminary final victory against Geelong, she went on to play all nine games culminating in a second premiership with the Crows in three years. Gathering 24 disposals and kicking one goal on the day, Hatchard was recognised as a key performer in her club's 45-point grand final triumph over Carlton, placing second with just one vote less than team mate Erin Phillips in the award for best on ground. Her season was punctuated with a maiden All-Australian selection and a re-commitment to Adelaide by signing a two-year contract during the trade period.

The 2020 AFL Women's season saw Hatchard obtain her second AFL Women's All-Australian team selection, named on the interchange bench.

== AFLW statistics ==
Statistics are correct to the end of the 2024 season

Legend
G	Goals	K	Kicks	D	Disposals	T	Tackles
B	Behinds	H	Handballs	M	Marks
†	Led the league for the season

Season	Team	No.	Games	Totals							Averages (per game)							Votes
Season	Team	No.	Games	G	B	K	H	D	M	T	G	B	K	H	D	M	T	Votes
2017	Adelaide	33	7	0	0	20	22	42	9	9	0.0	0.0	2.9	3.1	6.0	1.3	1.3	0
2018	Adelaide	33	4	1	0	14	16	30	4	9	0.3	0.0	3.5	4.0	7.5	1.0	2.3	0
2019	Adelaide	33	9	3	1	60	110^{†}	170	24	33	0.3	0.1	6.7	12.2^{†}	18.9	2.7	3.7	0
2020	Adelaide	33	6	1	2	67	85^{†}	152	28	34	0.2	0.3	11.2	14.2^{†}	25.3^{†}	4.7	5.7	10
2021	Adelaide	33	11	4	3	129	97	226	47	48	0.4	0.3	11.7	8.8	20.8	4.3	4.4	13
2022 (S6)	Adelaide	33	12	2	5	194	97	291	82^{†}	49	0.2	0.4	16.2	8.1	24.3	6.8^{†}	4.1	20
2022 (S7)	Adelaide	33	13	5	6	174	133	307	58^{†}	68	0.4	0.5	13.4	10.2	23.6	4.5	5.2	12
2023	Adelaide	33	12	8	7	135	182^{†}	317	65	68	0.7	0.6	11.3	15.2^{†}	26.4	5.4	5.7	13
2024	Adelaide	33	14	6	5	168	164	332	66	71	0.4	0.4	12.0	11.7	23.7	4.7	5.1	6
2025	Adelaide	33	14	10	5	114	137	251	72	62	0.7	0.6	8.1	9.8	17.9	5.1	4.4	8
Career			102	40	34	1075	1043	2118	455	452	0.4	0.3	10.5	10.2	20.8	4.5	4.4	82

== Personal life ==
In 2023, Hatchard married her wife Georgie in Las Vegas. The couple welcomed their first child, a daughter named Dallas, in February 2026.
