= 2021 Western Bulldogs Women's season =

Western Bulldogs
2021 season
- Coach: Nathan Burke (2nd season)
- Captains: Ellie Blackburn (3rd season)
- Home ground: Whitten Oval
- AFLW season: 8th
- Western Bulldogs Best and Fairest: Ellie Blackburn
- Leading goalkicker: Isabel Huntington (12)
- Highest home attendance: 3,479 vs. Carlton (Round 2)
- Lowest home attendance: 1,034 vs. North Melbourne (Round 7)
- Club membership: 2,177

The 2021 season was the Western Bulldogs's fifth season in the AFL Women's (AFLW) competition. Nathan Burke was the team's coach for the second consecutive season, and Ellie Blackburn was the team's captain for the third consecutive season. The Western Bulldogs finished the home-and-away season eighth on the ladder and with a win–loss record of 5–4, meaning they missed out on qualifying for finals.

Ellie Blackburn was the Western Bulldogs' best and fairest player, winning the Western Bulldogs best and fairest award for the second time in her career. Isabel Huntington, who kicked 12 goals, was the club's leading goal-kicker for the first time in her career. Blackburn was also selected in the all-Australian team. Eleanor Brown and Kirsty Lamb were other standout players for the Bulldogs that season.

== Background ==
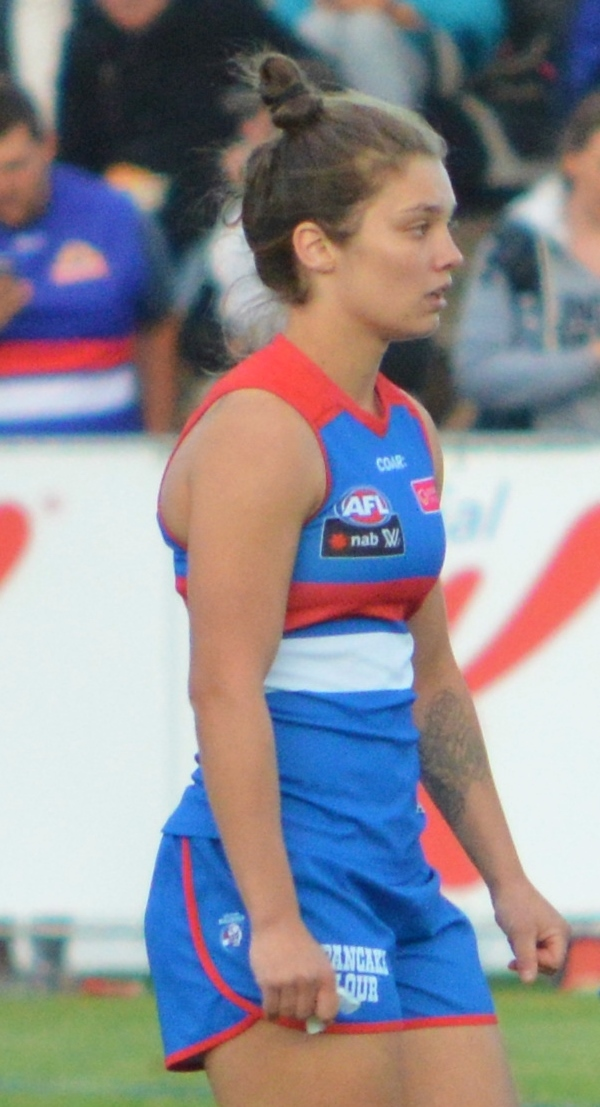
Ellie Blackburn captained the team in 2021.

The Western Bulldogs are an Australian rules football team based in Melbourne, Victoria, that competes in the AFL Women's. They ended the 2020 home-and-away season seventh in conference B, with a win-loss record of just 1–5. Their previous season ended after they failed to qualify for the finals series.

In the off season, Ellie Blackburn was named captain of the Western Bulldogs for the third year in a row. Brooke Lochland was named as the vice-captain. The leadership group was composed of Isabel Huntington, Ashleigh Guest, Kirsty Lamb, Bailey Hunt and Bonnie Toogood. Nathan Burke was named as head coach for a second season, Marcus Abney-Hastings joined the coaching panel as an assistant coach. They also retained line coaches Jack Fitzpatrick and Natalie Wood, and brought in Andrew Shakespeare as a skill acquisition coach. The team broke their AFLW membership record for the 2021 season, gaining a total of 2,177 members.

== Playing list ==
Western Bulldogs (AFL Women's)
Senior list		Rookie list	Coaching staff
1 Brooke Lochland (vc); 2 Ellie Blackburn (c); 3 Isabella Grant; 4 Isabel Huntington; 5 Gabby Newton; 6 Kirsten McLeod; 7 Deanna Berry; 8 Bonnie Toogood; 9 Eleanor Brown; 10 Katie Lynch; 11 Lauren Spark; 12 Gemma Lagioia; 13 Celine Moody; 14 Ellyse Gamble; 15 Sarah Hartwig	16 Naomi Ferres; 17 Elisabeth Georgostathis; 18 Britney Gutknecht; 19 Ashleigh Guest; 20 Isabelle Pritchard; 21 Bailey Hunt; 22 Hannah Scott; 23 Jess Fitzgerald; 24 Kim Rennie; 25 Nell Morris-Dalton; 26 Danielle Marshall; 27 Kirsty Lamb; 28 Amelia van Oosterwijck; 35 Annabel Strahan; 36 Angelica Gogos	31 Katy Herron (i)	Head coach: Nathan Burke; Assistant coaches: Jamie Shanahan (assistant); Dave Bartlett (assistant); Jack Fitzpatrick (assistant); Bob Murphy (leadership & culture); Andrew Shakespeare (skill acquisition); Jaryd Cachia (development); Claire Heffernan (development); Legend: (c) Captain(s); (vc) Vice-captain(s); Updated: Source(s): Players, Coaches

=== 2020 off-season list changes ===
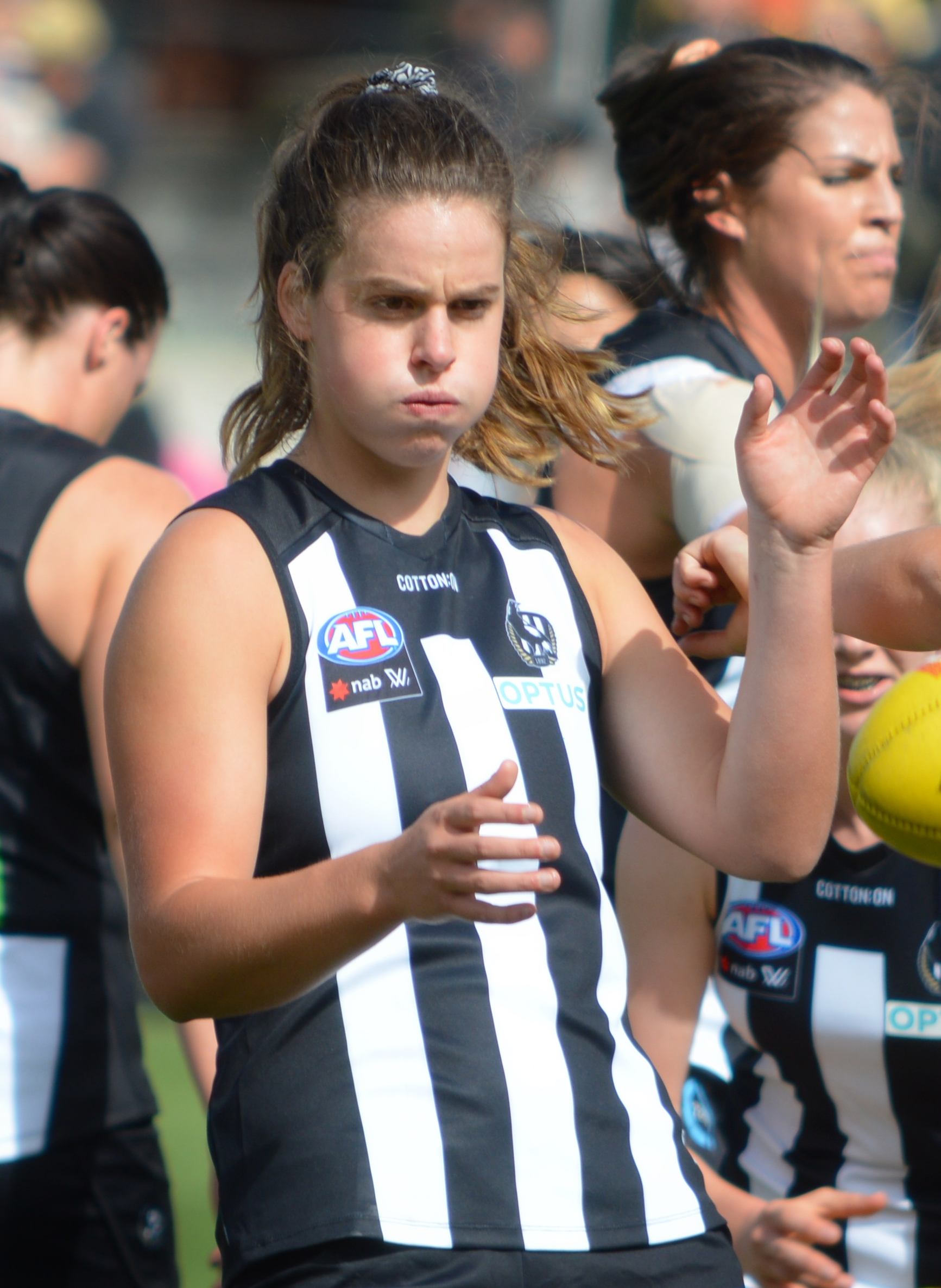
The Western Bulldogs brought in Collingwood player Katie Lynch over the trade period.

After the conclusion of the 2020 AFL Women's season, the Western Bulldogs did not delist any players. However, 2018 premiership player Nicole Callinan retired, and 2018 draftee Aisling McCarthy, alongside pick 3, was traded to West Coast in exchange for picks 2 and 16, while 2019 draftee Hannah Munyard was traded to Adelaide in a three way deal with Collingwood and Adelaide. That three-way deal also brought in forward-turned-defender Katie Lynch from Collingwood. The club also heavily hit the draft after a rather unsuccessful season, drafting Northern Knights midfielder Jess Fitzgerald at pick 2, Sandringham Dragons defender Sarah Hartwig at pick 11, and Western Jets utility Isabelle Pritchard at pick 16. Annabelle Strahan was brought in as a replacement player for Katy Herron, who was placed on the inactive list.

Removals from playing list
Player	Reason	Games played	Ref.
Nicole Callinan	Retired	24	
Aisling McCarthy	Traded	12	
Hannah Munyard	Traded	3	

Additions to playing list
Player	Acquired	Former club	Former league	Ref.
Katie Lynch	Traded from Collingwood	Collingwood	AFLW	
Jess Fitzgerald	No. 2, 2020 AFL Women's national draft	Northern Knights	NAB League Girls	
Sarah Hartwig	No. 11, 2020 AFL Women's national draft	Sandringham Dragons	NAB League Girls	
Isabelle Pritchard	No. 16, 2020 AFL Women's national draft	Western Jets	NAB League Girls	
Annabel Strahan	Injury replacement	Bendigo Pioneers	NAB League Girls	

== Season summary ==
Before the beginning of the 2021 AFLW season, it was decided that the conference ladder system would be scrapped in favour of all teams being placed on the same ladder. While an initial fixture was released in December 2020, the effects of the COVID-19 pandemic meant that the fixture was reshuffled multiple times in order to meet the restrictions of individual states.

The Western Bulldogs began their season with a 9-point loss to second-year expansion club St Kilda, playing in a prime time fixture slot on a Friday night. Inaccurate kicking saw them down 13 point at half time, despite having more scoring shots. After being down just tw points late in the final quarter, the Saints kicked the final goal of the match to win the game by 9 points. Although she was on the losing team, captain Ellie Blackburn secured the three Best and fairest votes for that game after kicking 2 goals and collecting 21 disposals. Isabel Huntington and Bonnie Toogood also kicked 2 goals apiece.

Round 2 saw the Bulldogs secure their first win of the season, triumphing over Carlton in the first game of the league's inaugural Pride Round. A crowd of 3,479 people attended the game, a season high. The game was very close throughout all four quarters, the margin never being more than 15 points. The first term kept the Bulldogs goalless, after a shocking missed shot by Kirsten McLeod from inside the goalsquare kept them from scoring more than 4 points. However, things improved from there, with Isabel Huntington and Jess Fitzgerald goalling each to keep the Bulldogs in the game. After being down 10 points at 3 quarter time, Ellie Blackburn and Kirsten McLeod kicked 3 goals between them to give the team an 8-point lead. Carlton had the chance to win the game but missed two crucial set shots, giving the Bulldogs victory. Blackburn once again secured the three best and fairest votes after kicking 2 final quarter goals and collecting 22 disposals.

The Bulldogs managed to secure their second win in a row after coming up against the low-placed Geelong in a low scoring affair, with the combined total of both teams' scores only reaching 33 points. The Bulldogs suffered from inaccuracy woes, at one point totalling a score of 1.6 (12) before kicking 2 final quarter goals through Fitzgerald and McLeod to win the game. Fitzgerald's goal was nominated

=== Results ===
Regular season results
Round	Date	Result	Score			Opponent	Score			Ground		Attendance	Ladder
Round	Date	Result	G	B	T	Opponent	G	B	T	Ground		Attendance	Ladder
1	29 January	Lost	6	6	42	St Kilda	8	3	51	Moorabbin Oval	A	2,523	8th
2	5 February	Won	6	6	42	Carlton	5	6	36	Whitten Oval	H	3,479	7th
3	12 February	Won	3	6	24	Geelong	1	3	9	Kardinia Park	A	1,980	7th
4	21 February	Won	6	1	39	Melbourne	2	12	24	Whitten Oval	H	3,180	6th
5	27 February	Won	7	5	47	Greater Western Sydney	3	4	22	Whitten Oval	H	2,461	5th
6	7 March	Lost	2	3	15	Collingwood	7	9	51	Victoria Park	A	3,017	7th
7	13 March	Lost	3	8	26	North Melbourne	5	7	37	Arden Street Oval	A	1,034	7th
8	21 March	Lost	3	4	22	Adelaide	12	6	78	Norwood Oval	A	1,749	8th
9	26 March	Won	7	3	45	Richmond	5	2	32	Whitten Oval	H	1,985	8th

Key
H	Home game
A	Away game

=== Statistics ===
The team used 28 players from the 31 on the playing list, of which four were debutants. Those debutants were Jess Fitzgerald and Sarah Hartwig (round 1), Isabella Grant (round 3) and Isabelle Pritchard (round 6). Katie Lynch made her club debut in round 1, after coming over from Collingwood.

Playing list and statistics
Player	No.	Games	Goals	Behinds	Kicks	Handballs	Disposals	Marks	Tackles	Notes/Milestone(s)
Brooke Lochland	1	9	1	1	87	40	127	28	27	
Ellie Blackburn	2	9	5	4	124	52	176	35	48	
Isabella Grant	3	2	0	0	9	4	13	1	3	AFLW debut (round 3)
Isabel Huntington	4	9	12	9	52	27	79	40	6	
Gabby Newton	5	9	0	0	45	34	79	17	34	
Kirsten McLeod	6	8	7	2	43	6	49	12	17	
Deanna Berry	7	5	0	1	27	17	44	9	19	
Bonnie Toogood	8	9	9	5	54	28	82	26	23	
Eleanor Brown	9	9	0	0	71	28	99	28	41	
Katie Lynch	10	9	0	0	63	20	83	28	22	Club debut (round 1)
Lauren Spark	11	1	0	0	5	0	5	2	0	
Gemma Lagioia	12	4	0	0	18	9	27	8	2	
Celine Moody	13	9	0	0	38	8	46	11	13	
Ellyse Gamble	14	8	0	0	20	21	41	6	15	
Sarah Hartwig	15	9	0	0	44	30	74	13	17	AFLW debut (round 1)
Naomi Ferres	16	8	0	0	44	44	88	14	17	
Elisabeth Georgostathis	17	9	1	0	47	39	86	14	40	
Britney Gutknecht	18	4	0	0	11	18	29	2	13	
Ashleigh Guest	19	9	0	0	70	22	92	23	15	
Isabelle Pritchard	20	4	0	1	14	20	34	6	9	AFLW debut (round 6)
Bailey Hunt	21	4	0	0	23	4	27	9	10	
Hannah Scott	22	5	0	0	32	7	39	7	11	
Jess Fitzgerald	23	9	5	6	47	44	91	13	37	AFLW debut (round 1)
Kim Rennie	24	6	0	0	13	21	34	8	9	
Nell Morris-Dalton	25	5	1	1	27	8	35	13	10	
Danielle Marshall	26	5	0	2	13	9	22	5	14	
Kirsty Lamb	27	9	2	3	103	59	162	37	54	
Amelia van Oosterwijck	28	0	—N/a	—N/a	—N/a	—N/a	—N/a	—N/a	—N/a	
Katy Herron	35	0	—N/a	—N/a	—N/a	—N/a	—N/a	—N/a	—N/a	Placed on inactive list
Annabelle Strahan	35	0	—N/a	—N/a	—N/a	—N/a	—N/a	—N/a	—N/a	
Angelica Gogos	30	3	0	0	23	0	23	7	9	

== Ladder ==
Pos	Team	Pld	W	L	D	PF	PA	PP	Pts	Qualification
1	Adelaide	9	7	2	0	446	214	208.4	28	Finals series
2	Brisbane (P)	9	7	2	0	390	200	195.0	28	Finals series
3	Collingwood	9	7	2	0	362	190	190.5	28	Finals series
4	Melbourne	9	7	2	0	382	293	130.4	28	Finals series
5	Fremantle	9	6	3	0	374	202	185.1	24	Finals series
6	North Melbourne	9	6	3	0	379	266	142.5	24	Finals series
7	Carlton	9	5	4	0	415	330	125.8	20	
8	Western Bulldogs	9	5	4	0	300	340	88.2	20	
9	Greater Western Sydney	9	4	5	0	240	324	74.1	16	
10	Richmond	9	3	6	0	312	369	84.6	12	
11	St Kilda	9	3	6	0	272	391	69.6	12	
12	West Coast	9	2	7	0	229	432	53.0	8	
13	Geelong	9	1	8	0	164	408	40.2	4	
14	Gold Coast	9	0	9	0	176	482	36.5	0	

Updated to match(es) played on 17 March 2021. Source: Womens.AFL
Rules for classification: 1) points; 2) percentage; 3) number of points for.
(P) Premiers

== Awards ==
The Western Bulldogs held their AFLW awards night on 24 April 2021. Captain Ellie Blackburn won the Best and Fairest award with 72 votes. Kirsty Lamb polled 63 votes to finish in second place, while Isabel Huntington, Eleanor Brown and Bonnie Toogood rounded out the top 5 with 51, 42 and 39 votes respectively. Jess Fitzgerald, the second pick overall in the 2020 AFL Women's draft, and Katie Lynch, a recruit from Collingwood, shared the title of Best Young Player.

Best and Fairest Ellie Blackburn and 2020 Rising Star winner Isabel Huntington were selected in the initial All-Australian squad of 40. While Huntington was not selected in the final squad, Blackburn achieved selection on the half forward flank. Blackburn was also awarded the Best Captain Award by the AFL Players Association, overcoming Melbourne captain Daisy Pearce and eventual league best and fairest Brianna Davey. Kirsty Lamb was nominated for the Most Courageous Player Award, but lost out to four-time winner Chelsea Randall. First-year player Jess Fitzgerald was also one of the three final nominees for the Goal of the Year award, but lost to Brisbane young gun Courtney Hodder.

Awards received by Western Bulldogs players
Award	Awarded by	Player	Result	Ref.
All-Australian team	AFL Women's	Ellie Blackburn	Won	
All-Australian team	AFL Women's	Isabel Huntington	Shortlisted	
Goal of the Year	AFL Women's	Jess Fitzgerald	Shortlisted	
Best Captain Award	AFL Players Association	Ellie Blackburn	Won	
Most Courageous Player Award	AFL Players Association	Kirsty Lamb	Shortlisted	
Best and Fairest	Western Bulldogs	Ellie Blackburn	Won	
Best Young Player	Western Bulldogs	Jess Fitzgerald	Won	
Best Young Player	Western Bulldogs	Katie Lynch	Won	
Most Improved	Western Bulldogs	Eleanor Brown	Won	
Coaches' Award	Western Bulldogs	Deanna Berry	Won	
Community Award	Western Bulldogs	Bonnie Toogood	Won	
Players' Player	Western Bulldogs	Bonnie Toogood	Won	
Players' Player	Western Bulldogs	Bailey Hunt	Won	
Trainers' Award	Western Bulldogs	Celine Moody	Won	

== See also ==
- 2021 Western Bulldogs season
