= Lagioia =

Lagioia is an Italian surname. Notable people with the surname include:

- Gemma Lagioia (born 2001), Australian rules footballer
- Nicola Lagioia (born 1973), Italian writer
