= AFL Women's goalkicking records =

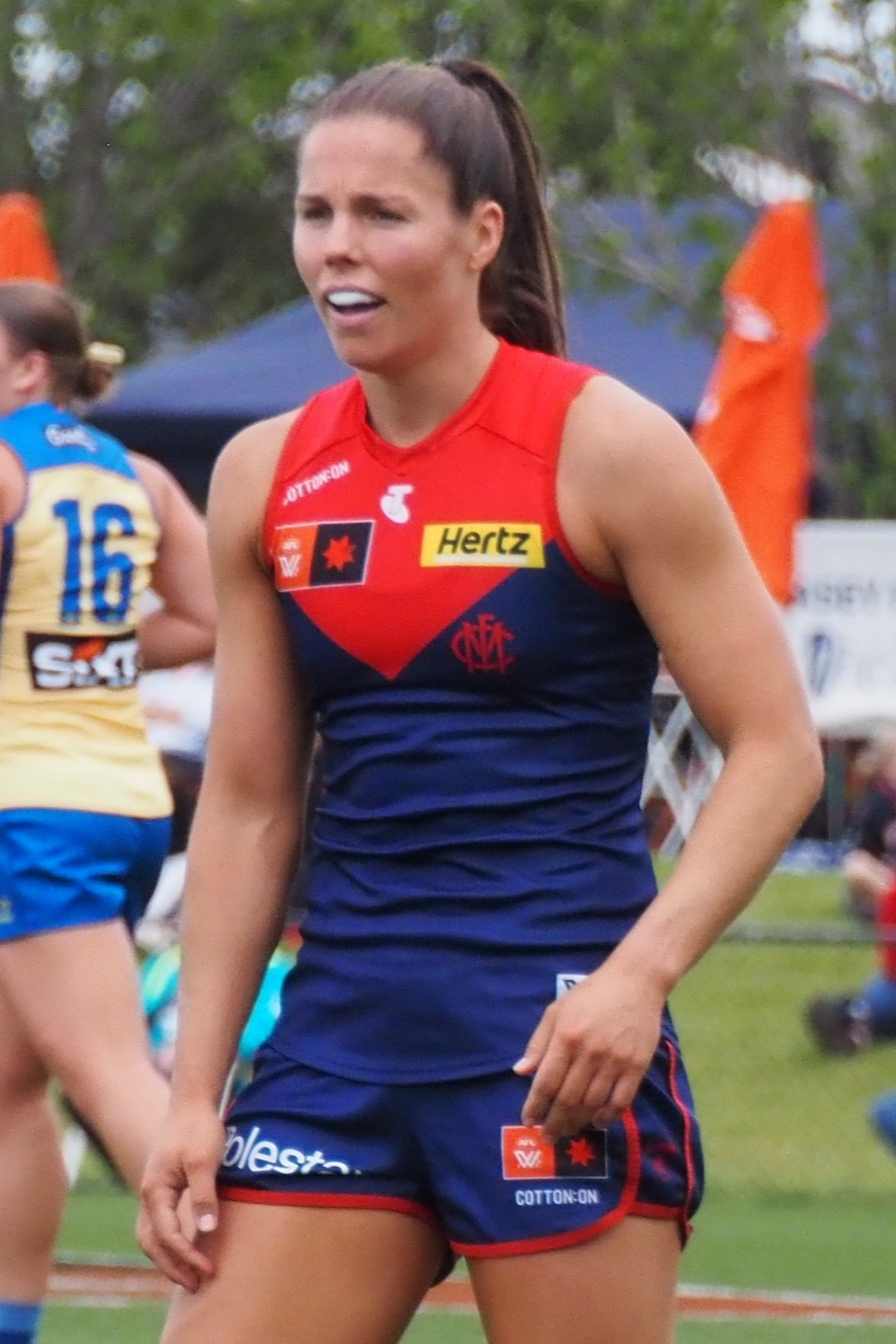
Melbourne premiership player Kate Hore is the AFL Women's all-time leading goalkicker with 105 goals

This page is a collection of AFL Women's goalkicking records. The AFL Women's (AFLW) is Australia's national semi-professional women's Australian rules football competition. The following tables only include goals kicked in home-and-away matches and finals; goals kicked in practice matches are excluded from the totals.

== Most AFL Women's goals ==
Below are the players who have kicked at least 50 goals at AFLW level.

^{‡}	Most AFL Women's goals for that club
**Bold**	Current player

Updated to the end of the 2025 season.

#	Player	Goals	Club(s)	Games	Average per game	Average per season	Career span	Ref.
1	**Kate Hore**	**105**^{‡}	**Melbourne**^{‡}	**93**	**1.13**	**11.67**	**2018–present**	
2	**Gemma Houghton**	**100**	Fremantle (2017–2022 (S6); 40 goals, 46 games)^{‡}	**86**	**1.16**	**10.00**	**2017–present**	
2	**Gemma Houghton**	**100**	**Port Adelaide (2022 (S7)–present; 60 goals, 40 games)**^{‡}	**86**	**1.16**	**10.00**	**2017–present**	
3	**Jasmine Garner**	**99**	Collingwood (2017–2018; 10 goals, 14 games)	**103**	**0.96**	**9.90**	**2017–present**	
3	**Jasmine Garner**	**99**	**North Melbourne (2019–present; 89 goals, 89 games)**^{‡}	**103**	**0.96**	**9.90**	**2017–present**	
4	**Danielle Ponter**	**91**^{‡}	**Adelaide**^{‡}	**86**	**1.07**	**11.38**	**2019–present**	
5	**Katie Brennan**	**84**	Western Bulldogs (2017–2019; 15 goals, 13 games)	**74**	**1.14**	**8.40**	**2017–present**	
5	**Katie Brennan**	**84**	**Richmond (2020–present; 69 goals, 61 games)**^{‡}	**74**	**1.14**	**8.40**	**2017–present**	
6	**Jesse Wardlaw**	**83**	Brisbane (2019–2022 (S7); 47 goals, 49 games)	**83**	**1.00**	**10.38**	**2019–present**	
6	**Jesse Wardlaw**	**83**	**St Kilda (2023–present; 36 goals, 34 games)**^{‡}	**83**	**1.00**	**10.38**	**2019–present**	
6	**Dakota Davidson**	**83**^{‡}	**Brisbane**^{‡}	**78**	**1.06**	**11.86**	**2020–present**	
8	**Tahlia Randall**	**82**	Brisbane (2017–2018; 0 goals, 15 games)	**105**	**0.78**	**8.20**	**2017–present**	
8	**Tahlia Randall**	**82**	**North Melbourne (2019–present; 82 goals, 90 games)**	**105**	**0.78**	**8.20**	**2017–present**	
9	**Tayla Harris**	**77**	Brisbane (2017; 4 goals, 8 games)	**85**	**0.91**	**7.70**	**2017–present**	
9	**Tayla Harris**	**77**	Carlton (2018–2021; 25 goals, 29 games)	**85**	**0.91**	**7.70**	**2017–present**	
9	**Tayla Harris**	**77**	**Melbourne (2022 (S6)–present; 48 goals, 48 games)**	**85**	**0.91**	**7.70**	**2017–present**	
9	**Eden Zanker**	**77**	Melbourne (2018–2025; 77 goals, 86 games)	**86**	**0.90**	**8.56**	**2018–present**	
9	**Eden Zanker**	**77**	**Fremantle (2026–present; 0 goals, 0 games)**	**86**	**0.90**	**8.56**	**2018–present**	
11	**Chloe Molloy**	**76**	Collingwood (2018–2022 (S7); 37 goals, 47 games)^{‡}	**69**	**1.10**	**8.44**	**2018–present**	
11	**Chloe Molloy**	**76**	**Sydney (2023–present; 39 goals, 22 games)**^{‡}	**69**	**1.10**	**8.44**	**2018–present**	
12	**Ashleigh Woodland**	**71**	Melbourne (2019; 0 goals, 4 games)	**75**	**0.95**	**10.14**	**2019, 2021–present**	
12	**Ashleigh Woodland**	**71**	Adelaide (2021–2022 (S7); 44 goals, 36 games)	**75**	**0.95**	**10.14**	**2019, 2021–present**	
12	**Ashleigh Woodland**	**71**	**Port Adelaide (2023–present; 27 goals, 35 games)**	**75**	**0.95**	**10.14**	**2019, 2021–present**	
13	**Kate Shierlaw**	**67**	Carlton (2017–2018; 3 goals, 10 games)	**82**	**0.82**	**7.44**	**2017–2018, 2020–present**	
13	**Kate Shierlaw**	**67**	St Kilda (2020–2022 (S7); 24 goals, 34 games)	**82**	**0.82**	**7.44**	**2017–2018, 2020–present**	
13	**Kate Shierlaw**	**67**	**North Melbourne (2023–present; 40 goals, 38 games)**	**82**	**0.82**	**7.44**	**2017–2018, 2020–present**	
13	**Greta Bodey**	**67**	Brisbane (2020–2022 (S7); 35 goals, 42 games)	**77**	**0.87**	**9.57**	**2020–present**	
13	**Greta Bodey**	**67**	**Hawthorn (2023–present; 32 goals, 35 games)**	**77**	**0.87**	**9.57**	**2020–present**	
13	**Taylor Smith**	**67**	Gold Coast (2020; 0 goals, 1 game)	**77**	**0.87**	**9.57**	**2020–present**	
13	**Taylor Smith**	**67**	Brisbane (2021–2025; 67 goals, 76 games)	**77**	**0.87**	**9.57**	**2020–present**	
13	**Taylor Smith**	**67**	**Sydney (2026–present; 0 goals, 0 games)**	**77**	**0.87**	**9.57**	**2020–present**	
16	**Darcy Vescio**	**66**^{‡}	**Carlton**^{‡}	**92**	**0.72**	**6.60**	**2017–present**	
17	**Caitlin Gould**	**64**	**Adelaide**	**70**	**0.91**	**9.14**	**2020–present**	
18	**Alyssa Bannan**	**62**	**Melbourne**	**74**	**0.84**	**10.33**	**2021–present**	
19	**Bonnie Toogood**	**60**	Western Bulldogs (2018–2022 (S6); 29 goals, 37 games)	**74**	**0.81**	**6.67**	**2018–present**	
19	**Bonnie Toogood**	**60**	**Essendon (2022 (S7)–present; 31 goals, 37 games)**^{‡}	**74**	**0.81**	**6.67**	**2018–present**	
19	**Caitlin Greiser**	**60**	St Kilda (2020–2022 (S7); 29 goals, 34 games)	**67**	**0.90**	**8.57**	**2020–present**	
19	**Caitlin Greiser**	**60**	**Richmond (2023–present; 31 goals, 33 games)**	**67**	**0.90**	**8.57**	**2020–present**	
19	**Tara Bohanna**	**60**	Gold Coast (2022 (S6)–2024; 45 goals, 42 games)^{‡}	**55**	**1.09**	**12.00**	**2022 (S6)–present**	
19	**Tara Bohanna**	**60**	**Carlton (2025–present; 15 goals, 13 games)**	**55**	**1.09**	**12.00**	**2022 (S6)–present**	
22	**Eloise Jones**	**58**	**Adelaide**	**83**	**0.70**	**6.44**	**2018–present**	
23	Cora Staunton	55^{‡}	Greater Western Sydney^{‡}	50	1.10	9.17	2018–2022 (S7)	
24	**Emma King**	**54**	Collingwood (2017–2018; 1 goal, 14 games)	**97**	**0.56**	**5.40**	**2017–present**	
24	**Emma King**	**54**	**North Melbourne (2019–present; 53 goals, 83 games)**	**97**	**0.56**	**5.40**	**2017–present**	
24	**Sophie Conway**	**54**	**Brisbane**	**89**	**0.61**	**6.00**	**2018–present**	
24	**Chloe Scheer**	**54**	Adelaide (2019–2021; 13 goals, 17 games)	**49**	**1.10**	**6.75**	**2019–present**	
24	**Chloe Scheer**	**54**	**Geelong (2022 (S6)–present; 41 goals, 32 games)**	**49**	**1.10**	**6.75**	**2019–present**	
27	Erin Phillips	53	Adelaide (2017–2022 (S6); 50 goals, 46 games)	66	0.80	6.63	2017–2023	
27	Erin Phillips	53	Port Adelaide (2022 (S7)–2023; 3 goals, 20 games)	66	0.80	6.63	2017–2023	
28	Rebecca Privitelli	52	Carlton (2017; 1 goal, 5 games)	64	0.81	5.78	2017–2018, 2020–2025	
28	Rebecca Privitelli	52	Greater Western Sydney (2018, 2020–2022 (S6); 14 goals, 23 games)	64	0.81	5.78	2017–2018, 2020–2025	
28	Rebecca Privitelli	52	Sydney (2022 (S7)–2025; 37 goals, 36 games)	64	0.81	5.78	2017–2018, 2020–2025	
28	**Courtney Hodder**	**52**	**Brisbane**	**77**	**0.68**	**8.67**	**2021–present**	
28	**Áine McDonagh**	**52**^{‡}	**Hawthorn**^{‡}	**44**	**1.18**	**13.00**	**2022 (S7)–present**	

== Club goalkicking record holders ==
Below are the players who hold the record for most goals kicked at their respective clubs.

^{§}	AFL Women's goalkicking record holder
**Bold**	Current player

Updated to the end of the 2025 season.

Club	Player	Goals	Games	Seasons	Ref.
Adelaide	**Danielle Ponter**	**91**	**86**	**2019–present**	
Brisbane	**Dakota Davidson**	**83**	**78**	**2020–present**	
Carlton	**Darcy Vescio**	**66**	**92**	**2017–present**	
Collingwood	Chloe Molloy	37	47	2018–2022 (S7)	
Essendon	**Bonnie Toogood**	**31**	**37**	**2022 (S7)–present**	
Fremantle	Gemma Houghton	40	46	2017–2022 (S6)	
Geelong	**Aishling Moloney**	**48**	**36**	**2023–present**	
Gold Coast	Tara Bohanna	45	42	2022 (S6)–2024	
Greater Western Sydney	Cora Staunton	55	50	2018–2022 (S7)	
Hawthorn	**Áine McDonagh**	**52**	**44**	**2022 (S7)–present**	
Melbourne	**Kate Hore**^{§}	**105**^{§}	**93**^{§}	**2018–present**^{§}	
North Melbourne	**Jasmine Garner**	**89**	**89**	**2019–present**	
Port Adelaide	**Gemma Houghton**	**60**	**40**	**2022 (S7)–present**	
Richmond	**Katie Brennan**	**69**	**61**	**2020–present**	
St Kilda	**Jesse Wardlaw**	**36**	**34**	**2023–present**	
Sydney	**Chloe Molloy**	**39**	**22**	**2023–present**	
West Coast	**Kellie Gibson**	**30**	**56**	**2020–present**	
Western Bulldogs	**Ellie Blackburn**	**37**	**83**	**2017–present**	

== AFL Women's goalkicking record holder ==
**Bold**	Current player

Updated to the end of the 2025 season.

Player	Total	Record broken/equalled	Career goals	Club(s)	Career span
**Gemma Houghton**	First to reach 100 goals (round 12, 2025)		**100**	Fremantle (2017–2022 (S6); 46 games, 40 goals)	**2017–present**
**Gemma Houghton**	First to reach 100 goals (round 12, 2025)		**100**	**Port Adelaide (2017–2022 (S6); 40 games, 60 goals)**	**2017–present**
**Kate Hore**	**100**	Finals week 1, 2025	**105**	**Melbourne**	**2018–present**

== See also ==
- AFL Women's games records
- VFL/AFL goalkicking records

== Sources ==
- Every AFLW goalkicker at AustralianFootball.com
