= Emma Stark (umpire) =

Australian field umpire

Emma Stark is an Australian field umpire for the AFLW, the strongest female league for Australian rules football in the world. She made her professional debut at age 16 in an Essendon–Hawthorn AFLW game in August 2022 (in AFL Women's season seven), the youngest field umpire to ever officiate at AFL or AFLW level. Stark started umpiring when she was 13 in the Northern Territory Football League, rapidly rising through the ranks.

Stark is also a talented player of the game, and she says she is unsure if she wants to try for a career as a player or an umpire. She entered the women’s league with many accolades already to her name, taking out the NTFL under-15s best and fairest in 2021 and the leading goalkicker award after kicking 54 goals for the competition. While playing for St Mary's, Stark was selected to represent The Allies in the under-18 AFLW National Championships in 2022.

After making her senior football debut during the 2021–22 NTFL season, Stark would win the under-18s best and fairest award.

In 2022, Stark was named the Northern Territory's junior sportsperson of the year.
