= Cam Bernasconi =

Personal information
- Full name: Cameron Bernasconi

Coaching career^{3}
Years	Club	Games (W–L–D)
2022 (S7)–	Greater Western Sydney (W)	43 (9–34–1)
- ^{3} Coaching statistics correct as of the 2025 season.

Cameron Bernasconi is a former Australian rules footballer and current senior coach. Bernasconi is the head coach of Greater Western Sydney in the AFL Women's competition (AFLW).

== Playing career ==
Bernasconi played his junior football at Tuggeranong Football Club. He was then a member of Greater Western Sydney's inaugural TAC Cup side in 2010. Bernasconi played senior football at North East Australian Football League clubs Ainslie and the Canberra Demons before returning to Ainslie to finish his playing career in the AFL Canberra competition.

== Coaching career ==
Bernasconi was appointed by the Australian Football League as talent and coaching manager for the Australian Capital Territory and southern New South Wales regions in 2014. During this time, he studied his level-three coaching accreditation and became involved with the Giants' AFLW program in their inaugural 2017 season.

In 2020, Bernasconi was appointed head coach of the Giants Academy, which competed on an invitational basis in the NAB League. In April 2022, Bernasconi was appointed head coach of the Giants' AFLW team ahead of the competition's seventh season.
