= 2022 AFL Women's season 7 =

Seventh season of the AFL Women's (AFLW) competition

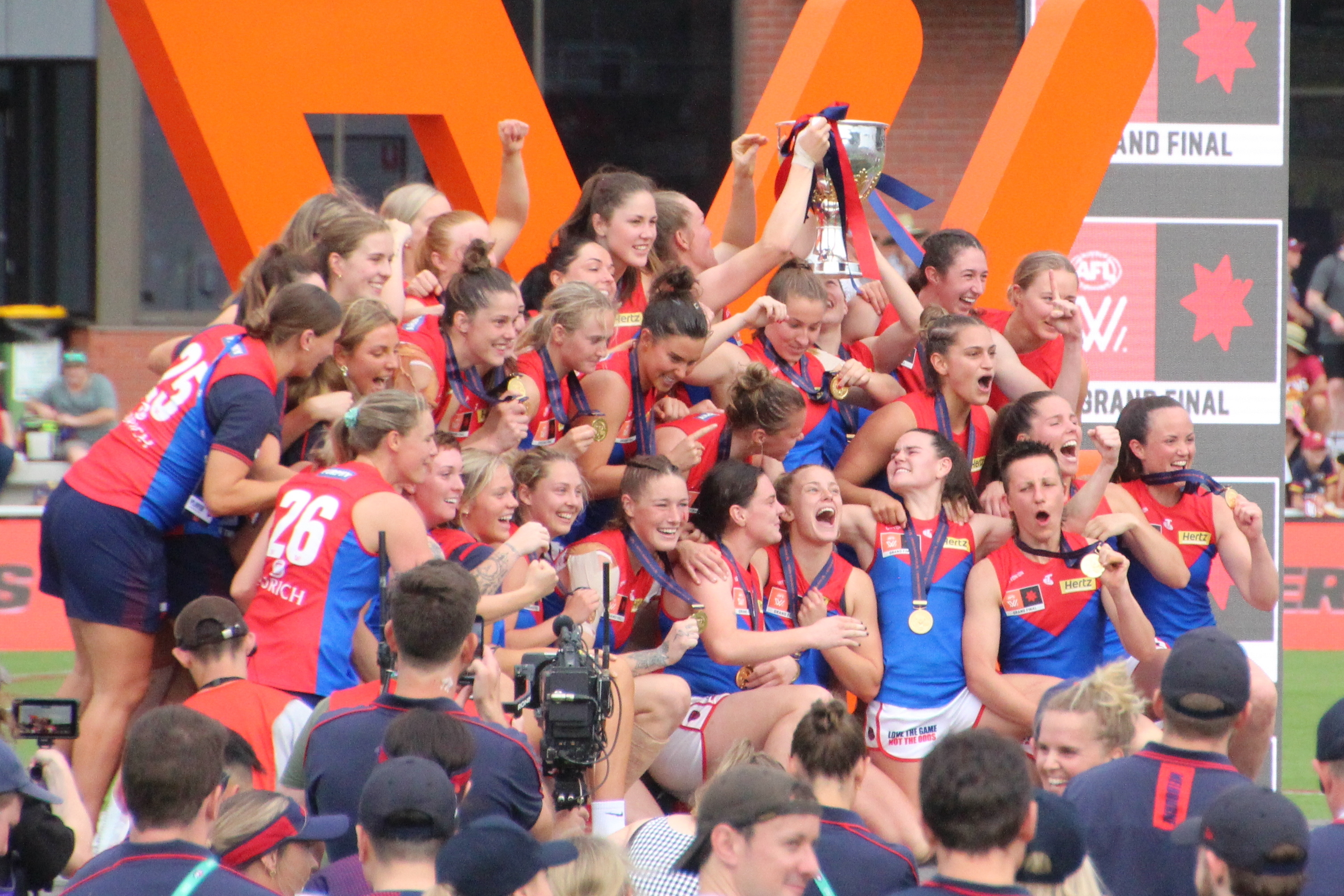
- Melbourne players celebrate after winning the 2022 AFL Women's season 7 Grand Final

Overview
- Date: 25 August – 27 November 2022
- Teams: 18
- Premiers: Melbourne; 1st premiership
- Runners-up: Brisbane; 3rd runners-up result
- Minor premiers: Brisbane; 2nd minor premiership
- Best and fairest: Ally Anderson (Brisbane); 21 votes
- Leading goalkicker: Jesse Wardlaw (Brisbane); 19 goals

Attendance
- Matches played: 99
- Total attendance: 265,950 (2,686 per match)
- Highest (H&A): 20,652 (round 6, Port Adelaide v Adelaide)
- Highest (finals): 7,412 (grand final, Brisbane v Melbourne)

2022 AFL Women's season 7 was the seventh season of the AFL Women's (AFLW) competition, the highest-level senior women's Australian rules football competition in Australia. The season featured 18 clubs, marking the first time all Australian Football League (AFL) clubs participated in the competition, and ran from 25 August to 27 November, comprising a ten-round home-and-away season followed by a four-week finals series featuring the top eight clubs. It was the second AFL Women's season to take place in the 2022 calendar year and the first to have an August start date. AFL clubs Essendon, Hawthorn, Port Adelaide and Sydney featured for the first time in season 7.

Melbourne won the premiership, defeating Brisbane by four points in the 2022 AFL Women's season 7 Grand Final. Brisbane won the minor premiership by finishing atop the home-and-away ladder with a 9–1 win–loss record. Brisbane's Ally Anderson won the AFL Women's best and fairest award as the league's best and fairest player, and teammate Jesse Wardlaw won the AFL Women's leading goalkicker award as the league's leading goalkicker.

== Background ==
Payment tiers in season 7
Tier	Wage (AU$)
1	$71,935
2	$55,559
3	$47,372
4	$39,184

In August 2021, Essendon, Hawthorn, Port Adelaide and Sydney – the four Australian Football League (AFL) clubs yet to receive an AFLW licence at the time – were granted licences to join the AFL Women's competition in what was then slated to be a 2022–23 season, meaning all 18 clubs would have an AFLW team for the first time. In May 2022, a one-year bridging collective bargaining agreement (CBA) was announced which would see the competition's seventh season begin during the AFL pre-finals bye in the last weekend of August and conclude with the grand final in the last weekend of November. The CBA also saw player payments rise by 94% across all four payment tiers, with eight players per club occupying the top two tiers and the minimum (tier 4) wage increasing from $20,239 to $39,184. Later in May, AFL head of women's football Nicole Livingstone revealed that the season would be named AFLW season 7, in a deviation from previous seasons.

The season 7 fixture was announced in early July. Match times on Saturdays in September (except 24 September, the date of the AFL Grand Final) were floating to maximise doubleheader opportunities, and the final round was released as a floating fixture to be determined later in the season. In August, after the round 1 match between Essendon and Hawthorn was moved from ETU Stadium to Marvel Stadium following a sell-out, Livingstone said that the AFL would consider moving more matches to larger venues depending on ticket sales; the round 2 match between Melbourne and North Melbourne was moved to the Melbourne Cricket Ground to act as a curtain raiser to the AFL qualifying final between Melbourne and Sydney.

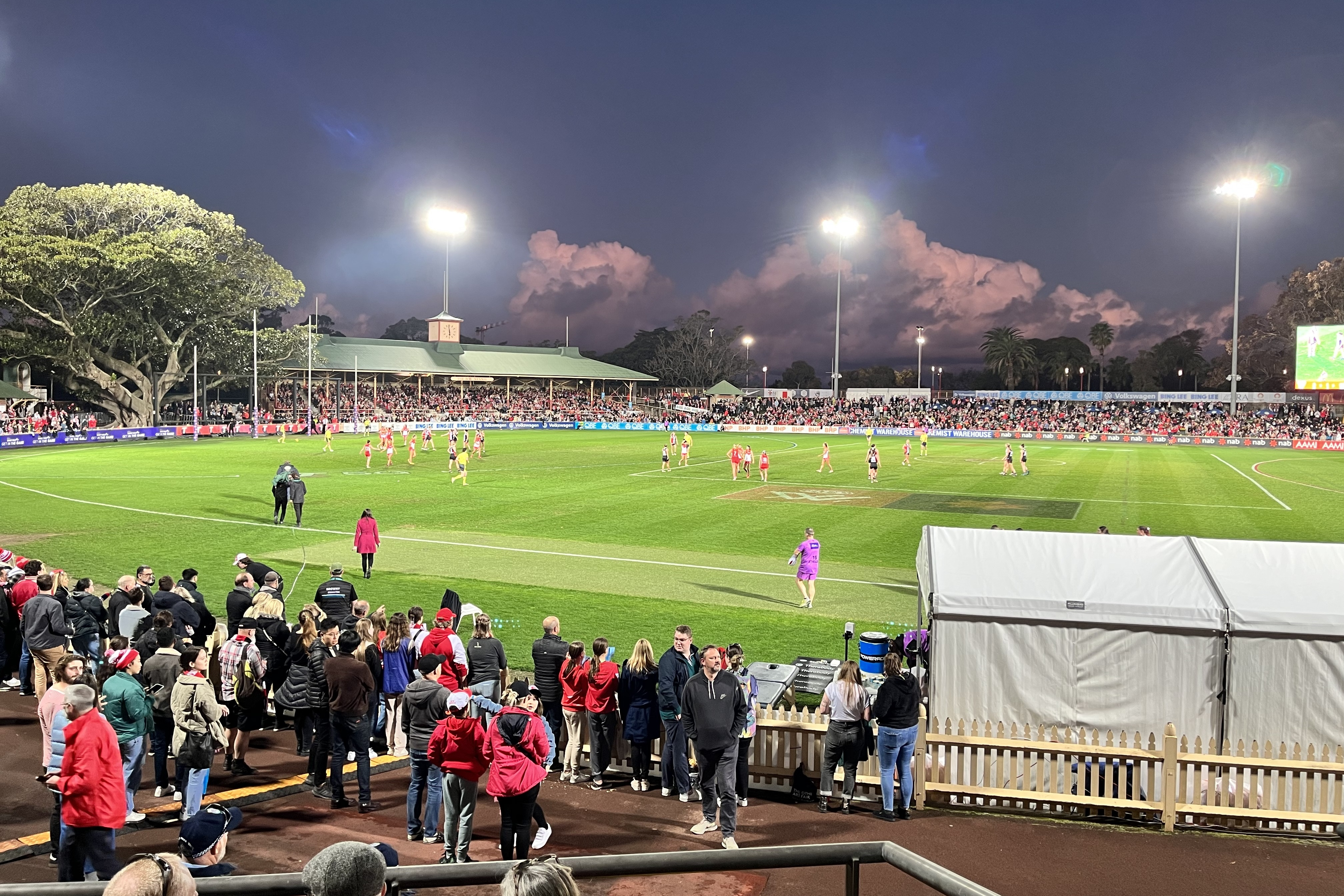
Sydney and St Kilda playing in Sydney's inaugural AFLW match

Season 7's Indigenous Round was launched in early September, and was played across rounds 3 and 4. The round is held to acknowledge the significant contribution of Aboriginal and Torres Strait Islander women and girls to Australian football and the broader community. Aunty Pam Pederson, the youngest daughter of Sir Douglas Nicholls, was announced as the round's honouree, and all 18 teams wore specially designed guernseys across the two weeks. Melbourne rebranded itself as the Narrm Football Club for Indigenous Round, as it did during the corresponding round of the AFL season; Narrm is the traditional name for Melbourne in the Woiwurrung language. Pride Round, which was played in round 8, was launched in early October. The round is held "to promote and support diversity and inclusion of LGBTQI+ communities and families, and acknowledges the AFL's journey to being a more inclusive sport"; this season's iteration also celebrated allies of LGBTQI+ people within the sport. Like with Indigenous Round, all 18 teams wore specially designed guernseys for the occasion.

The season began on 25 August with a match between Carlton and Collingwood and concluded on 27 November with the 2022 AFL Women's season 7 Grand Final, contested by Brisbane and Melbourne. The season featured ten home-and-away rounds, the same as the previous season, and a four-week finals series, up from three weeks the previous season; the finals were contested by the top eight teams, up from six the previous season, and the finals system was the same as the AFL's. Melbourne won its first AFL Women's premiership, defeating Brisbane by four points in the grand final, played at Brighton Homes Arena. All matches throughout season 7 were broadcast live on the Seven Network and Fox Footy, and could be streamed via Kayo, womens.afl and the official AFL and AFLW apps.

== Coach appointments ==
New coach	Club	Date of appointment	Previous coach	Ref.
Bec Goddard	Hawthorn	12 August 2021	Inaugural	
Scott Gowans	Sydney	4 February 2022	Inaugural	
Natalie Wood	Essendon	18 March 2022	Inaugural	
Lauren Arnell	Port Adelaide	12 April 2022	Inaugural	
Cameron Bernasconi	Greater Western Sydney	12 April 2022	Alan McConnell	

== Club leadership ==
Club	Coach	Leadership group		
Club	Coach	Captain(s)	Vice-captain(s)	Other leader(s)
Adelaide	Matthew Clarke	Chelsea Randall	Sarah Allan	Eloise Jones, Ebony Marinoff, Stevie-Lee Thompson
Brisbane	Craig Starcevich	Breanna Koenen	Nat Grider	Ally Anderson, Emily Bates
Carlton	Daniel Harford	Kerryn Peterson	Jessica Dal Pos, Darcy Vescio	Mimi Hill, Lucy McEvoy, Breann Moody
Collingwood	Stephen Symonds	Steph Chiocci, Brianna Davey	Brittany Bonnici, Ruby Schleicher	Lauren Butler, Chloe Molloy
Essendon	Natalie Wood	Steph Cain, Bonnie Toogood		Georgia Nanscawen, Jacqui Vogt
Fremantle	Trent Cooper	Hayley Miller	Angelique Stannett	Janelle Cuthbertson, Gabby O'Sullivan, Laura Pugh
Geelong	Daniel Lowther	Meg McDonald	Nina Morrison	Julia Crockett-Grills, Chantel Emonson, Georgie Rankin, Rebecca Webster
Gold Coast	Cameron Joyce	Tara Bohanna	Elizabeth Keaney, Jamie Stanton	Ellie Hampson
Greater Western Sydney	Cameron Bernasconi	Alicia Eva	Alyce Parker	Nicola Barr, Chloe Dalton, Pepa Randall
Hawthorn	Bec Goddard	Tilly Lucas-Rodd	Jess Duffin	Tamara Luke, Louise Stephenson
Melbourne	Mick Stinear	Daisy Pearce	Kate Hore	Libby Birch, Tyla Hanks
North Melbourne	Darren Crocker	Emma Kearney	Jasmine Garner, Emma King	Nicole Bresnehan, Ellie Gavalas, Ashleigh Riddell, Sarah Wright
Port Adelaide	Lauren Arnell	Erin Phillips	Ange Foley	Hannah Dunn, Gemma Houghton, Justine Mules
Richmond	Ryan Ferguson	Katie Brennan	Sarah Hosking	Monique Conti, Rebecca Miller, Gabby Seymour
St Kilda	Nick Dal Santo	Hannah Priest	Bianca Jakobsson, Kate Shierlaw	Nicola Stevens
Sydney	Scott Gowans	Maddy Collier, Brooke Lochland, Lauren Szigeti		Rebecca Privitelli, Lisa Steane, Alana Woodward
West Coast	Michael Prior	Emma Swanson	Dana Hooker	Aisling McCarthy
Western Bulldogs	Nathan Burke	Ellie Blackburn		Bailey Hunt, Kirsty Lamb, Katie Lynch

== Home-and-away season ==
All starting times are local time. Sources: womens.afl (fixture and results), Australian Football (crowd figures)

=== Round 1 ===
	Round 1
Thursday, 25 August (7:10 pm)	Carlton 3.0 (18)	def. by	Collingwood 5.6 (36)	Ikon Park (crowd: 4,128)	Report; Stats
Friday, 26 August (7:10 pm)	Adelaide 4.2 (26)	def. by	Melbourne 6.8 (44)	ACH Group Stadium (crowd: 3,417)	Report; Stats
Saturday, 27 August (1:10 pm)	North Melbourne 6.4 (40)	def.	Gold Coast 2.2 (14)	Blundstone Arena (crowd: 2,459)	Report; Stats
Saturday, 27 August (1:10 pm)	West Coast 6.4 (40)	def.	Port Adelaide 4.4 (28)	Mineral Resources Park (crowd: 1,846)	Report; Stats
Saturday, 27 August (5:10 pm)	Sydney 4.3 (27)	def. by	St Kilda 8.8 (56)	North Sydney Oval (crowd: 8,264)	Report; Stats
Saturday, 27 August (7:10 pm)	Essendon 7.11 (53)	def.	Hawthorn 4.3 (27)	Marvel Stadium (crowd: 12,092)	Report; Stats
Sunday, 28 August (12:10 pm)	Western Bulldogs 6.5 (41)	def.	Greater Western Sydney 5.4 (34)	Ikon Park (crowd: 1,890)	Report; Stats
Sunday, 28 August (2:10 pm)	Brisbane 11.10 (76)	def.	Fremantle 4.3 (27)	The Gabba (crowd: 3,421)	Report; Stats
Sunday, 28 August (4:10 pm)	Geelong 2.3 (15)	def.	Richmond 1.5 (11)	GMHBA Stadium (crowd: 4,252)	Report; Stats
The Adelaide v Melbourne match was originally scheduled to be played at Norwood Oval, however after a heavy workload of matches at the time and heavy rainfall, the AFL moved the match to ACH Group Stadium due to the condition of Norwood Oval's playing surface.; The crowd of 8,264 at the Sydney v St Kilda match is the largest attendance for an AFLW match in New South Wales.; The Essendon v Hawthorn match was originally scheduled to be played at ETU Stadium, however after tickets for the match sold out in less than two hours and following pushes from coaches and fans, the AFL moved the match to Marvel Stadium to allow more fans to attend.; Umpire Emma Stark made her AFLW umpiring debut in the Essendon v Hawthorn match at the age of 16, becoming the youngest field umpire to officiate at AFL or AFLW level.

=== Round 2 ===
	Round 2
Friday, 2 September (5:00 pm)	Melbourne 3.8 (26)	def.	North Melbourne 4.0 (24)	Melbourne Cricket Ground (crowd: 17,851)	Report; Stats
Saturday, 3 September (11:40 am)	Richmond 4.3 (27)	def. by	Adelaide 5.6 (36)	Swinburne Centre (crowd: 1,075)	Report; Stats
Saturday, 3 September (1:10 pm)	Port Adelaide 1.3 (9)	def. by	Western Bulldogs 3.10 (28)	Alberton Oval (crowd: 5,367)	Report; Stats
Saturday, 3 September (11:40 am)	Fremantle 0.1 (1)	def. by	Geelong 3.9 (27)	Fremantle Community Bank Oval (crowd: 1,086)	Report; Stats
Sunday, 4 September (11:10 am)	Essendon 4.7 (31)	def. by	Carlton 5.2 (32)	ETU Stadium (crowd: 2,738)	Report; Stats
Sunday, 4 September (1:10 pm)	Collingwood 6.9 (45)	def.	Sydney 2.2 (14)	Victoria Park (crowd: 1,976)	Report; Stats
Sunday, 4 September (3:10 pm)	Greater Western Sydney 3.2 (20)	def. by	Brisbane 10.7 (67)	Manuka Oval (crowd: 2,342)	Report; Stats
Sunday, 4 September (4:10 pm)	Hawthorn 1.4 (10)	def. by	St Kilda 9.9 (63)	Box Hill City Oval (crowd: 2,262)	Report; Stats
Sunday, 4 September (5:10 pm)	Gold Coast 7.5 (47)	def.	West Coast 2.2 (14)	Metricon Stadium (crowd: 860)	Report; Stats
The Melbourne v North Melbourne match was originally scheduled to be played at ETU Stadium, but was moved to the Melbourne Cricket Ground to act as a curtain raiser to the AFL qualifying final between Melbourne and Sydney. Tickets needed to be purchased for the AFL final to access the AFLW match.; Greater Western Sydney's losing margin of 47 points against Brisbane was its equal-biggest loss in the AFLW until its 96-point loss in round 5.; Gold Coast's winning margin of 33 points against West Coast was its biggest win in the AFLW until its 34-point win in round 7.

=== Round 3 ===
	Round 3 (Indigenous Round week 1)
Friday, 9 September (5:10 pm)	Western Bulldogs 3.5 (23)	def.	Fremantle 3.2 (20)	Ikon Park (crowd: 1,058)	Report; Stats
Saturday, 10 September (12:10 pm)	Adelaide 4.6 (30)	def.	North Melbourne 2.4 (16)	Wigan Oval (crowd: 2,034)	Report; Stats
Saturday, 10 September (2:40 pm)	Sydney 2.6 (18)	def. by	Greater Western Sydney 9.11 (65)	Sydney Cricket Ground (crowd: 4,233)	Report; Stats
Saturday, 10 September (4:10 pm)	Geelong 1.5 (11)	def. by	Collingwood 2.3 (15)	GMHBA Stadium (crowd: 1,957)	Report; Stats
Saturday, 10 September (4:40 pm)	Brisbane 12.10 (82)	def.	Gold Coast 1.3 (9)	The Gabba (crowd: 2,582)	Report; Stats
Sunday, 11 September (12:10 pm)	Carlton 4.3 (27)	drew with	Port Adelaide 4.3 (27)	Ikon Park (crowd: 1,664)	Report; Stats
Sunday, 11 September (2:10 pm)	St Kilda 3.2 (20)	def. by	Melbourne 6.10 (46)	RSEA Park (crowd: 2,758)	Report; Stats
Sunday, 11 September (4:10 pm)	Richmond 7.2 (44)	def.	Hawthorn 1.3 (9)	Swinburne Centre (crowd: 2,031)	Report; Stats
Sunday, 11 September (4:10 pm)	West Coast 4.8 (32)	def. by	Essendon 13.6 (84)	Mineral Resources Park (crowd: 1,501)	Report; Stats
Melbourne across the two rounds of the Indigenous Round rebranded itself as Narrm, becoming the first club to adopt an Indigenous club name for the annual round. The club's men's team had done likewise in the 2022 AFL season.; Greater Western Sydney's score of 9.11 (65) and winning margin of 47 points against Sydney is its highest score and biggest win in the AFLW.; Gold Coast's losing margin of 73 points against Brisbane is its biggest loss in the AFLW.; Essendon's score of 13.6 (84) against West Coast is the highest score of any team in its debut season in AFLW history. Its first-half score of 9.4 (58) was also the highest first-half score in AFLW history until it was surpassed in round 10.

=== Round 4 ===
	Round 4 (Indigenous Round week 2)
Friday, 16 September (5:10 pm)	North Melbourne 4.4 (28)	def.	Geelong 2.4 (16)	University of Tasmania Stadium (crowd: 540)	Report; Stats
Saturday, 17 September (11:10 am)	Greater Western Sydney 1.3 (9)	def. by	West Coast 2.4 (16)	Giants Stadium (crowd: 727)	Report; Stats
Saturday, 17 September (12:05 pm)	Gold Coast 5.12 (42)	def.	St Kilda 4.4 (28)	Great Barrier Reef Arena (crowd: 1,117)	Report; Stats
Saturday, 17 September (12:40 pm)	Port Adelaide 10.8 (68)	def.	Sydney 0.2 (2)	Alberton Oval (crowd: 2,741)	Report; Stats
Saturday, 17 September (12:05 pm)	Fremantle 5.2 (32)	drew with	Carlton 5.2 (32)	Fremantle Community Bank Oval (crowd: 1,023)	Report; Stats
Saturday, 17 September (3:10 pm)	Hawthorn 1.1 (7)	def. by	Western Bulldogs 6.1 (37)	Box Hill City Oval (crowd: 1,108)	Report; Stats
Sunday, 18 September (12:10 pm)	Collingwood 2.4 (16)	def. by	Adelaide 2.9 (21)	Victoria Park (crowd: 876)	Report; Stats
Sunday, 18 September (2:10 pm)	Essendon 3.6 (24)	def. by	Richmond 3.8 (26)	ETU Stadium (crowd: 3,044)	Report; Stats
Sunday, 18 September (4:10 pm)	Melbourne 4.3 (27)	def. by	Brisbane 6.6 (42)	Casey Fields (crowd: 757)	Report; Stats
Carlton became the first team in AFLW history to play in consecutive draws.; The Collingwood v Adelaide match marked the first time an AFLW match was officiated by three female field umpires.

=== Round 5 ===
	Round 5
Thursday, 22 September (1:10 pm)	West Coast 3.5 (23)	def. by	Fremantle 3.8 (26)	Optus Stadium (crowd: 6,552)	Report; Stats
Thursday, 22 September (5:10 pm)	Geelong 11.5 (71)	def.	St Kilda 3.3 (21)	GMHBA Stadium (crowd: 2,898)	Report; Stats
Friday, 23 September (12:40 pm)	Western Bulldogs 4.4 (28)	def. by	North Melbourne 6.7 (43)	Swinburne Centre (crowd: 2,121)	Report; Stats
Friday, 23 September (3:10 pm)	Collingwood 4.4 (28)	def.	Essendon 2.5 (17)	AIA Vitality Centre (crowd: 3,412)	Report; Stats
Friday, 23 September (5:10 pm)	Sydney 4.7 (31)	def. by	Hawthorn 5.5 (35)	Swinburne Centre (crowd: 2,055)	Report; Stats
Friday, 23 September (7:30 pm)	Carlton 1.2 (8)	def. by	Melbourne 7.8 (50)	Ikon Park (crowd: 1,580)	Report; Stats
Saturday, 24 September (11:10 am)	Richmond 2.6 (18)	def.	Brisbane 1.8 (14)	Swinburne Centre (crowd: 1,426)	Report; Stats
Sunday, 25 September (1:10 pm)	Gold Coast 7.4 (46)	def.	Port Adelaide 5.2 (32)	Bond University (crowd: 1,419)	Report; Stats
Sunday, 25 September (2:40 pm)	Adelaide 15.7 (97)	def.	Greater Western Sydney 0.1 (1)	Wigan Oval (crowd: 1,991)	Report; Stats
The Gold Coast v Port Adelaide match was originally scheduled to be played at Kombumerri Park, however the AFL moved the match to Bond University due to the condition of Kombumerri Park's playing surface.; Adelaide's score of 15.7 (97) and winning margin of 96 points against Greater Western Sydney is its highest score in the AFLW and the biggest win in AFLW history.

=== Round 6 ===
	Round 6 (Good for Footy Round)
Friday, 30 September (6:10 pm)	Hawthorn 6.8 (44)	def.	West Coast 6.5 (41)	SkyBus Stadium (crowd: 1,560)	Report; Stats
Friday, 30 September (7:30 pm)	Port Adelaide 0.3 (3)	def. by	Adelaide 8.15 (63)	Adelaide Oval (crowd: 20,652)	Report; Stats
Saturday, 1 October (12:10 pm)	Greater Western Sydney 4.5 (29)	def.	Carlton 1.6 (12)	Henson Park (crowd: 1,162)	Report; Stats
Saturday, 1 October (2:10 pm)	Western Bulldogs 5.6 (36)	def. by	Geelong 5.7 (37)	Mars Stadium (crowd: 1,731)	Report; Stats
Saturday, 1 October (4:10 pm)	St Kilda 5.4 (34)	def. by	Collingwood 4.12 (36)	RSEA Park (crowd: 2,578)	Report; Stats
Saturday, 1 October (6:10 pm)	Richmond 3.5 (23)	def.	Gold Coast 3.1 (19)	Swinburne Centre (crowd: 1,644)	Report; Stats
Sunday, 2 October (12:10 pm)	Brisbane 8.14 (62)	def.	Essendon 3.0 (18)	Moreton Bay Central Sports Complex (crowd: 1,477)	Report; Stats
Sunday, 2 October (12:10 pm)	Fremantle 5.6 (36)	def. by	Melbourne 10.6 (66)	Fremantle Community Bank Oval (crowd: 1,548)	Report; Stats
Sunday, 2 October (5:10 pm)	North Melbourne 9.13 (67)	def.	Sydney 0.1 (1)	Swinburne Centre (crowd: 1,356)	Report; Stats
The North Melbourne v Sydney match was originally scheduled to be played at Arden Street Oval, however after heavy use and bad weather, the AFL moved the match to Swinburne Centre due to the condition of Arden Street Oval's playing surface.; North Melbourne's winning margin of 66 points against Sydney is its biggest win in the AFLW.

=== Round 7 ===
	Round 7
Friday, 7 October (6:10 pm)	St Kilda 2.5 (17)	def. by	Carlton 6.8 (44)	RSEA Park (crowd: 1,234)	Report; Stats
Friday, 7 October (5:10 pm)	West Coast 3.6 (24)	def. by	Richmond 6.7 (43)	Mineral Resources Park (crowd: 1,259)	Report; Stats
Saturday, 8 October (1:10 pm)	Sydney 2.3 (15)	def. by	Gold Coast 7.7 (49)	Henson Park (crowd: 1,619)	Report; Stats
Saturday, 8 October (2:40 pm)	Adelaide 7.7 (49)	def.	Fremantle 5.1 (31)	Wigan Oval (crowd: 2,800)	Report; Stats
Saturday, 8 October (5:10 pm)	North Melbourne 3.8 (26)	def. by	Brisbane 5.3 (33)	Arden Street Oval (crowd: 1,644)	Report; Stats
Saturday, 8 October (7:10 pm)	Hawthorn 4.5 (29)	def.	Port Adelaide 1.10 (16)	SkyBus Stadium (crowd: 2,029)	Report; Stats
Sunday, 9 October (1:10 pm)	Essendon 4.4 (28)	def. by	Geelong 6.7 (43)	Reid Oval (crowd: 4,560)	Report; Stats
Sunday, 9 October (3:10 pm)	Melbourne 10.13 (73)	def.	Western Bulldogs 1.3 (9)	Casey Fields (crowd: 2,154)	Report; Stats
Sunday, 9 October (5:10 pm)	Collingwood 6.10 (46)	def.	Greater Western Sydney 2.2 (14)	Victoria Park (crowd: 1,663)	Report; Stats
Gold Coast's winning margin of 34 points against Sydney is its biggest win in the AFLW.

=== Round 8 ===
	Round 8 (Pride Round)
Friday, 14 October (6:30 pm)	Carlton 5.4 (34)	def. by	Richmond 6.8 (44)	Ikon Park (crowd: 1,919)	Report; Stats
Friday, 14 October (7:30 pm)	Brisbane 8.5 (53)	def.	Adelaide 4.7 (31)	Metricon Stadium (crowd: 1,233)	Report; Stats
Saturday, 15 October (12:40 pm)	Port Adelaide 4.5 (29)	def. by	North Melbourne 7.12 (54)	Alberton Oval (crowd: 2,818)	Report; Stats
Saturday, 15 October (3:10 pm)	Essendon 7.6 (48)	def.	Sydney 7.2 (44)	Ikon Park (crowd: 2,658)	Report; Stats
Saturday, 15 October (5:40 pm)	Geelong 4.10 (34)	def.	West Coast 4.1 (25)	Ikon Park (crowd: 1,085)	Report; Stats
Saturday, 15 October (6:40 pm)	Gold Coast 1.3 (9)	def. by	Melbourne 9.4 (58)	Metricon Stadium (crowd: 1,004)	Report; Stats
Sunday, 16 October (1:10 pm)	Western Bulldogs 4.11 (35)	def.	St Kilda 3.2 (20)	Mars Stadium (crowd: 1,714)	Report; Stats
Sunday, 16 October (3:10 pm)	Greater Western Sydney 4.10 (34)	def.	Hawthorn 5.3 (33)	Henson Park (crowd: 2,006)	Report; Stats
Sunday, 16 October (2:10 pm)	Fremantle 0.3 (3)	def. by	Collingwood 4.8 (32)	Fremantle Community Bank Oval (crowd: 2,117)	Report; Stats

=== Round 9 ===
	Round 9
Friday, 21 October (5:10 pm)	Adelaide 4.6 (30)	def.	Geelong 4.4 (28)	Wigan Oval (crowd: 2,573)	Report; Stats
Friday, 21 October (6:40 pm)	Gold Coast 6.6 (42)	def.	Carlton 2.3 (15)	Metricon Stadium (crowd: 683)	Report; Stats
Saturday, 22 October (1:10 pm)	Collingwood 4.1 (25)	def. by	North Melbourne 9.3 (57)	Victoria Park (crowd: 1,504)	Report; Stats
Saturday, 22 October (3:10 pm)	Sydney 4.4 (28)	def. by	Fremantle 6.6 (42)	Henson Park (crowd: 2,577)	Report; Stats
Saturday, 22 October (2:10 pm)	West Coast 3.5 (23)	def. by	Western Bulldogs 8.7 (55)	Mineral Resources Park (crowd: 1,102)	Report; Stats
Saturday, 22 October (7:10 pm)	Hawthorn 1.1 (7)	def. by	Brisbane 9.7 (61)	SkyBus Stadium (crowd: 2,164)	Report; Stats
Sunday, 23 October (1:10 pm)	St Kilda 4.11 (35)	def.	Port Adelaide 5.3 (33)	RSEA Park (crowd: 1,514)	Report; Stats
Sunday, 23 October (3:10 pm)	Richmond 9.4 (58)	def.	Greater Western Sydney 2.3 (15)	Mildura Sporting Precinct (crowd: 2,359)	Report; Stats
Sunday, 23 October (5:10 pm)	Melbourne 7.8 (50)	def.	Essendon 1.3 (9)	Casey Fields (crowd: 1,518)	Report; Stats

=== Round 10 ===
	Round 10
Friday, 28 October (6:10 pm)	Carlton 4.7 (31)	def. by	Western Bulldogs 5.4 (34)	Ikon Park (crowd: 1,193)	Report; Stats
Friday, 28 October (7:10 pm)	Brisbane 8.7 (55)	def.	Collingwood 1.4 (10)	Metricon Stadium (crowd: 1,180)	Report; Stats
Saturday, 29 October (1:10 pm)	Melbourne 11.13 (79)	def.	West Coast 0.1 (1)	Casey Fields (crowd: 726)	Report; Stats
Saturday, 29 October (3:10 pm)	St Kilda 2.1 (13)	def. by	Adelaide 4.5 (29)	RSEA Park (crowd: 1,167)	Report; Stats
Saturday, 29 October (5:10 pm)	Geelong 15.12 (102)	def.	Sydney 4.3 (27)	GMHBA Stadium (crowd: 2,084)	Report; Stats
Saturday, 29 October (4:10 pm)	Fremantle 7.7 (49)	def.	Hawthorn 7.2 (44)	Fremantle Community Bank Oval (crowd: 1,302)	Report; Stats
Sunday, 30 October (12:40 pm)	Port Adelaide 1.4 (10)	def. by	Essendon 5.7 (37)	Alberton Oval (crowd: 2,096)	Report; Stats
Sunday, 30 October (3:10 pm)	North Melbourne 3.9 (27)	drew with	Richmond 4.3 (27)	Arden Street Oval (crowd: 3,147)	Report; Stats
Sunday, 30 October (5:10 pm)	Greater Western Sydney 7.2 (44)	def.	Gold Coast 4.8 (32)	Henson Park (crowd: 1,491)	Report; Stats
West Coast's losing margin of 78 points against Melbourne is its biggest loss in the AFLW.; Geelong's score of 15.12 (102) and winning margin of 75 points is its highest score and biggest win in the AFLW; its first-half score of 9.6 (60) is the highest first-half score in AFLW history.

== Ladder ==
Pos	Team	Pld	W	L	D	PF	PA	PP	Pts	Qualification
1	Brisbane	10	9	1	0	545	193	282.4	36	Finals series
2	Melbourne (P)	10	9	1	0	519	184	282.1	36	Finals series
3	Adelaide	10	8	2	0	412	232	177.6	32	Finals series
4	Richmond	10	7	2	1	321	217	147.9	30	Finals series
5	Geelong	10	7	3	0	384	222	173.0	28	Finals series
6	Collingwood	10	7	3	0	289	244	118.4	28	Finals series
7	Western Bulldogs	10	7	3	0	326	297	109.8	28	Finals series
8	North Melbourne	10	6	3	1	382	229	166.8	26	Finals series
9	Gold Coast	10	5	5	0	309	351	88.0	20	
10	Essendon	10	4	6	0	349	354	98.6	16	
11	Greater Western Sydney	10	4	6	0	265	420	63.1	16	
12	Fremantle	10	3	6	1	267	400	66.8	14	
13	St Kilda	10	3	7	0	307	373	82.3	12	
14	Carlton	10	2	6	2	253	342	74.0	12	
15	Hawthorn	10	3	7	0	245	429	57.1	12	
16	West Coast	10	2	8	0	239	449	53.2	8	
17	Port Adelaide	10	1	8	1	255	361	70.6	6	
18	Sydney	10	0	10	0	207	577	35.9	0	

Source: afl.com.au
Rules for classification: 1) points; 2) percentage; 3) number of points for
(P) Premiers

== Progression by round ==
4	Finished the round in first place	0	Finished the round in last place
4	Won the minor premiership	0	Finished the season in last place
4	Finished the round inside the top eight		
4_{1}	Subscript indicates the ladder position at the end of the round		

Team	1	2	3	4	5	6	7	8	9	10
Brisbane	4_{2}	8_{3}	12_{1}	16_{1}	16_{1}	20_{1}	24_{1}	28_{1}	32_{1}	36_{1}
Melbourne	4_{6}	8_{6}	12_{4}	12_{4}	16_{4}	20_{3}	24_{3}	28_{2}	32_{2}	36_{2}
Adelaide	0_{13}	4_{10}	8_{8}	12_{5}	16_{2}	20_{2}	24_{2}	24_{4}	28_{3}	32_{3}
Richmond	0_{11}	0_{13}	4_{10}	8_{8}	12_{8}	16_{8}	20_{6}	24_{6}	28_{4}	30_{4}
Geelong	4_{8}	8_{1}	8_{5}	8_{10}	12_{6}	16_{6}	20_{5}	24_{5}	24_{7}	28_{5}
Collingwood	4_{4}	8_{4}	12_{2}	12_{3}	16_{3}	20_{4}	24_{4}	28_{3}	28_{5}	28_{6}
Western Bulldogs	4_{9}	8_{5}	12_{3}	16_{2}	16_{5}	16_{7}	16_{9}	20_{8}	24_{8}	28_{7}
North Melbourne	4_{1}	4_{7}	4_{11}	8_{9}	12_{7}	16_{5}	16_{7}	20_{7}	24_{6}	26_{8}
Gold Coast	0_{18}	4_{9}	4_{14}	8_{12}	12_{9}	12_{9}	16_{8}	16_{9}	20_{9}	20_{9}
Essendon	4_{5}	4_{8}	8_{6}	8_{6}	8_{10}	8_{10}	8_{12}	12_{10}	12_{10}	16_{10}
Greater Western Sydney	0_{10}	0_{15}	4_{12}	4_{15}	4_{16}	8_{13}	8_{15}	12_{12}	12_{13}	16_{11}
Fremantle	0_{17}	0_{18}	0_{16}	2_{16}	6_{15}	6_{17}	6_{17}	6_{17}	10_{15}	14_{12}
St Kilda	4_{3}	8_{2}	8_{7}	8_{7}	8_{11}	8_{11}	8_{13}	8_{14}	12_{11}	12_{13}
Carlton	0_{15}	4_{11}	6_{9}	8_{11}	8_{12}	8_{14}	12_{10}	12_{11}	12_{12}	12_{14}
Hawthorn	0_{14}	0_{17}	0_{18}	0_{17}	4_{17}	8_{15}	12_{11}	12_{13}	12_{14}	12_{15}
West Coast	4_{7}	4_{12}	4_{13}	8_{13}	8_{13}	8_{12}	8_{14}	8_{15}	8_{16}	8_{16}
Port Adelaide	0_{12}	0_{14}	2_{15}	6_{14}	6_{14}	6_{16}	6_{16}	6_{16}	6_{17}	6_{17}
Sydney	0_{16}	0_{16}	0_{17}	0_{18}	0_{18}	0_{18}	0_{18}	0_{18}	0_{18}	0_{18}

Source: Australian Football

== Home matches and membership ==
The following table includes all home match attendance figures from the home-and-away season.

Team	Home match attendance					Members
Team	Hosted	Total	Highest	Lowest	Average	Members
Adelaide	5	12,699	3,417	1,891	2,540	6,706
Brisbane	5	9,442	3,421	1,026	1,888	2,323
Carlton	5	10,484	4,128	1,580	2,097	3,882
Collingwood	5	9,771	3,412	1,076	1,954	5,621
Essendon	5	24,340	12,092	2,658	4,868	4,245
Fremantle	5	7,076	2,117	1,023	1,415	2,552
Geelong	5	12,276	4,252	1,085	2,548	5,938
Gold Coast	5	5,083	1,419	683	1,017	1,194
Greater Western Sydney	5	7,728	2,342	727	1,546	2,984
Hawthorn	5	9,128	2,262	1,108	1,826	5,427
Melbourne	5	23,006	17,851	726	4,601	3,362
North Melbourne	5	9,146	3,147	540	1,829	3,349
Port Adelaide	5	33,674	20,652	2,096	6,735	4,782
Richmond	5	8,535	2,359	1,075	1,707	2,662
St Kilda	5	9,251	2,758	1,167	1,850	5,114
Sydney	5	18,866	8,264	1,619	3,773	7,757
West Coast	5	12,415	6,552	1,257	2,483	3,538
Western Bulldogs	5	8,450	2,057	1,058	1,690	4,132
Total/overall	90	231,370	20,652	540	2,571	75,568

Source: Australian Football

== Finals series ==
Qualifying and elimination finals
5 November, Metricon Stadium
1	Brisbane	5.9 (39)
4	Richmond	3.4 (22)
5 November, GMHBA Stadium
5	Geelong	1.8 (14)
8	North Melbourne	2.4 (16)
6 November, Victoria Park
6	Collingwood	5.10 (40)
7	Western Bulldogs	5.5 (35)
4 November, Ikon Park
2	Melbourne	7.6 (48)
3	Adelaide	4.3 (27)

Semi-finals
12 November, Swinburne Centre
Richmond	6.2 (38)
North Melbourne	11.8 (74)
12 November, Wigan Oval
Adelaide	3.5 (23)
Collingwood	1.5 (11)

Preliminary finals
18 November, Metricon Stadium
Brisbane	7.4 (46)
Adelaide	3.5 (23)
19 November, Ikon Park
Melbourne	5.3 (33)
North Melbourne	2.4 (16)

Grand final
27 November, Brighton Homes Arena
Brisbane	2.3 (15)
Melbourne	2.7 (19)

All starting times are local time. Sources: womens.afl (fixture and results), Australian Football (crowd figures)

=== Finals week 1 ===
	Second qualifying final
Friday, 4 November (7:10 pm)	Melbourne 7.6 (48)	def.	Adelaide 4.3 (27)	Ikon Park (crowd: 2,555)	Report; Stats

	First qualifying final
Saturday, 5 November (3:10 pm)	Brisbane 5.9 (39)	def.	Richmond 3.4 (22)	Metricon Stadium (crowd: 2,392)	Report; Stats

	First elimination final
Saturday, 5 November (7:10 pm)	Geelong 1.8 (14)	def. by	North Melbourne 2.4 (16)	GMHBA Stadium (crowd: 4,338)	Report; Stats

	Second elimination final
Sunday, 6 November (3:10 pm)	Collingwood 5.10 (40)	def.	Western Bulldogs 5.5 (35)	Victoria Park (crowd: 4,823)	Report; Stats
Collingwood forward Eliza James became the first player to kick four goals in a final.

=== Finals week 2 ===
	First semi-final
Saturday, 12 November (1:40 pm)	Richmond 6.2 (38)	def. by	North Melbourne 11.8 (74)	Swinburne Centre (crowd: 2,439)	Report; Stats

	Second semi-final
Saturday, 12 November (3:40 pm)	Adelaide 3.5 (23)	def.	Collingwood 1.5 (11)	Wigan Oval (crowd: 2,476)	Report; Stats
The semi-final between Adelaide and Collingwood was delayed by 30 minutes due to lightning, and by a further 20 minutes during the quarter-time break.

=== Finals week 3 ===
	First preliminary final
Friday, 18 November (6:40 pm)	Brisbane 7.4 (46)	def.	Adelaide 3.5 (23)	Metricon Stadium (crowd: 2,553)	Report; Stats

	Second preliminary final
Saturday, 19 November (3:10 pm)	Melbourne 5.3 (33)	def.	North Melbourne 2.4 (16)	Ikon Park (crowd: 5,592)	Report; Stats

=== Grand final ===
	Grand final
Sunday, 27 November (1:40 pm)	Brisbane 2.3 (15)	def. by	Melbourne 2.7 (19)	Brighton Homes Arena (crowd: 7,412)	Report; Stats

== Win–loss table ==
The following table can be sorted from biggest winning margin to biggest losing margin for each round. If two or more matches in a round are decided by the same margin, these margins are sorted by percentage (i.e. the lowest-scoring winning team is ranked highest and the lowest-scoring losing team is ranked lowest). Home matches are in bold, and opponents are listed above the margins.

+	Win		Qualified for finals
−	Loss		Eliminated
	Draw	X	Bye

Team	Home-and-away season										Ladder	Finals series			
Team	1	2	3	4	5	6	7	8	9	10	Ladder	F1	F2	F3	GF
Adelaide	**MEL** **−18**	RIC +9	**NM** **+14**	COL +5	**GWS** **+96**	PA +60	**FRE** **+18**	BRI −22	**GEE** **+2**	STK +15	3 (8–2–0)	MEL −21	**COL** **+12**	BRI −23	
Brisbane	**FRE** **+49**	GWS +47	**GC** **+73**	MEL +15	RIC −4	**ESS** **+44**	NM +7	**ADE** **+22**	HAW +54	**COL** **+45**	1 (9–1–0)	**RIC** **+17**	X	**ADE** **+23**	**MEL** **−4**
Carlton	**COL** **−18**	ESS +1	**PA**; **0**	FRE; 0	**MEL** **−42**	GWS −17	STK +27	**RIC** **−10**	GC −27	**WB** **−3**	14 (2–6–2)				
Collingwood	CAR +18	**SYD** **+31**	GEE +4	**ADE** **−5**	**ESS** **+11**	STK +2	**GWS** **+32**	FRE +29	**NM** **−32**	BRI −45	6 (7–3–0)	**WB** **+5**	ADE −12		
Essendon	**HAW** **+26**	**CAR** **−1**	WC +52	**RIC** **−2**	COL −11	BRI −44	**GEE** **−15**	**SYD** **+4**	MEL −41	PA +27	10 (4–6–0)				
Fremantle	BRI −49	**GEE** **−26**	WB −3	**CAR**; **0**	WC +3	**MEL** **−30**	ADE −18	**COL** **−29**	SYD +14	**HAW** **+5**	12 (3–6–1)				
Geelong	**RIC** **+4**	FRE +26	**COL** **−4**	NM −12	**STK** **+50**	WB +1	ESS +15	**WC** **+9**	ADE −2	**SYD** **+75**	5 (7–3–0)	**NM** **−2**			
Gold Coast	NM −26	**WC** **+33**	BRI −73	**STK** **+14**	**PA** **+14**	RIC −4	SYD +34	**MEL** **−49**	**CAR** **+27**	GWS −12	9 (5–5–0)				
Greater Western Sydney	WB −7	**BRI** **−47**	SYD +47	**WC** **−7**	ADE −96	**CAR** **+17**	COL −32	**HAW** **+1**	RIC −43	**GC** **+12**	11 (4–6–0)				
Hawthorn	ESS −26	**STK** **−53**	RIC −35	**WB** **−30**	SYD +4	**WC** **+3**	**PA** **+13**	GWS −1	**BRI** **−54**	FRE −5	15 (3–7–0)				
Melbourne	ADE +18	**NM** **+2**	STK +26	**BRI** **−15**	CAR +42	FRE +30	**WB** **+64**	GC +49	**ESS** **+41**	**WC** **+78**	2 (9–1–0)	**ADE** **+21**	X	**NM** **+17**	BRI +4
North Melbourne	**GC** **+26**	MEL −2	ADE −14	**GEE** **+12**	WB +15	**SYD** **+66**	**BRI** **−7**	PA +25	COL +32	**RIC**; **0**	8 (6–3–1)	GEE +2	RIC +36	MEL −17	
Port Adelaide	WC −12	**WB** **−19**	CAR; 0	**SYD** **+66**	GC −14	**ADE** **−60**	HAW −13	**NM** **−25**	STK −2	**ESS** **−27**	17 (1–8–1)				
Richmond	GEE −4	**ADE** **−9**	**HAW** **+35**	ESS +2	**BRI** **+4**	**GC** **+4**	WC +19	CAR +10	**GWS** **+43**	NM; 0	4 (7–2–1)	BRI −17	**NM** **−36**		
St Kilda	SYD +29	HAW +53	**MEL** **−26**	GC −14	GEE −50	**COL** **−2**	**CAR** **−27**	WB −15	**PA** **+2**	**ADE** **−15**	13 (3–7–0)				
Sydney	**STK** **−29**	COL −31	**GWS** **−47**	PA −66	**HAW** **−4**	NM −66	**GC** **−34**	ESS −4	**FRE** **−14**	GEE −75	18 (0–10–0)				
West Coast	**PA** **+12**	GC −33	**ESS** **−52**	GWS +7	**FRE** **−3**	HAW −3	**RIC** **−19**	GEE −9	**WB** **−32**	MEL −78	16 (2–8–0)				
Western Bulldogs	**GWS** **+7**	PA +19	**FRE** **+3**	HAW +30	**NM** **−15**	**GEE** **−1**	MEL −64	**STK** **+15**	WC +32	CAR +3	7 (7–3–0)	COL −5			

Source: Australian Football

== Season notes ==
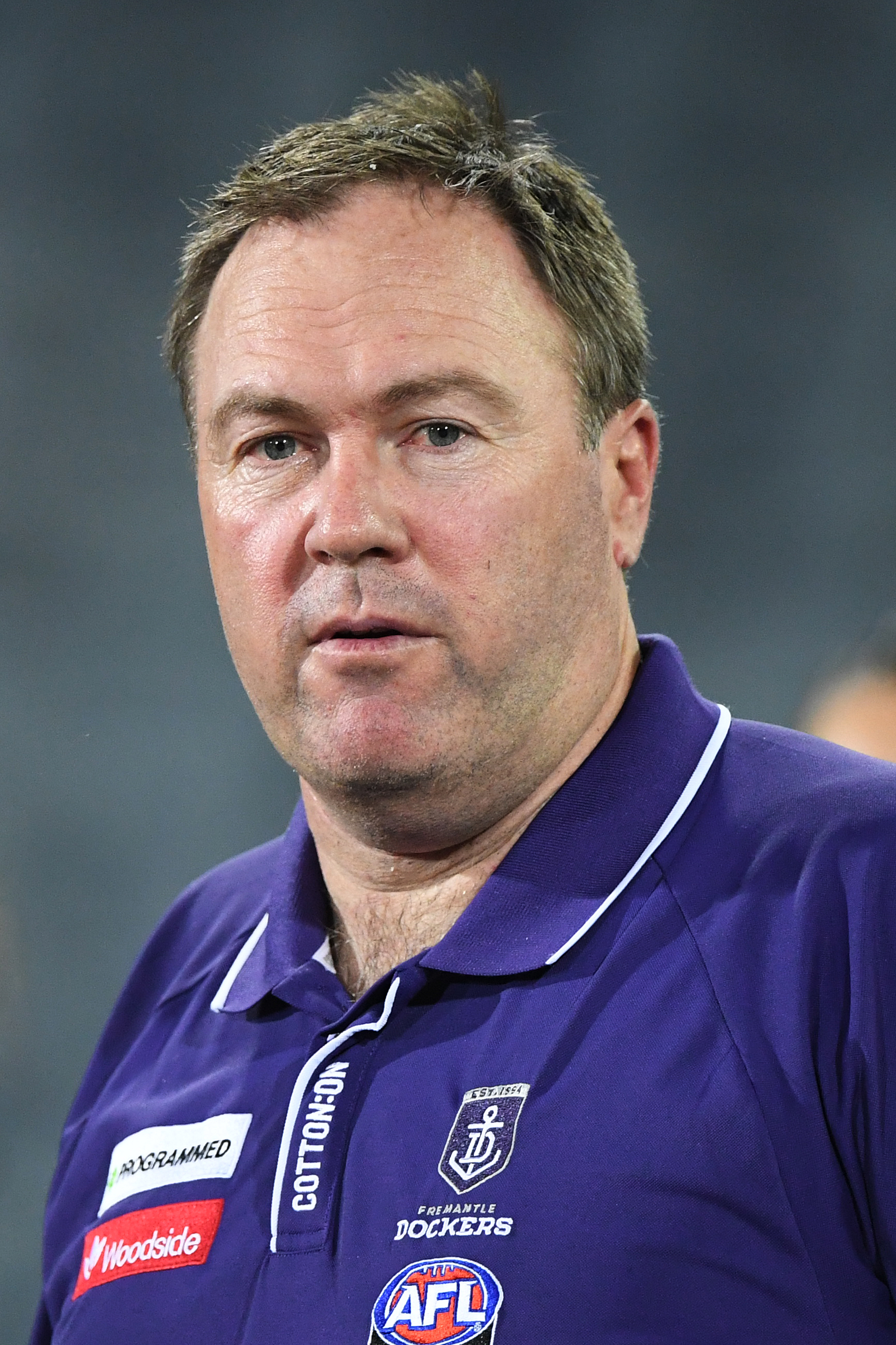
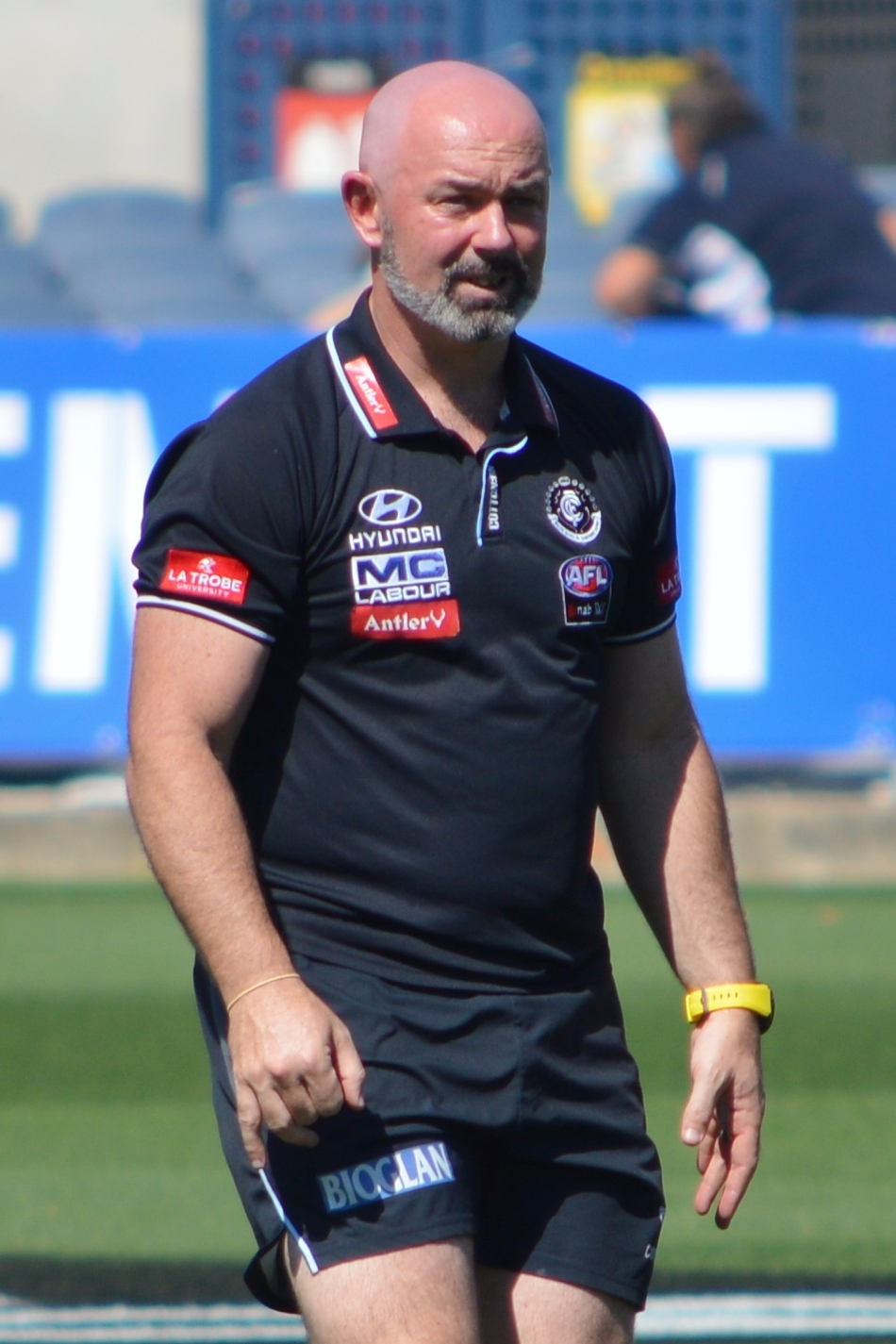
Fremantle chose to not renew the contract of senior coach Trent Cooper (left) at the end of the season, while Carlton and senior coach Daniel Harford (right) parted ways following a club review
- Brisbane kicked 33 goals across the first three rounds of the season, an AFLW record, and became the first AFLW team to score more than 200 points across the first three rounds of a season.
- Four teams recorded scores of 0.1 (1), the lowest score in AFLW history, during the season: Fremantle in round 2 against Geelong, Greater Western Sydney in round 5 against Adelaide, Sydney in round 6 against North Melbourne and West Coast in round 10 against Melbourne.
- Brisbane won the minor premiership by the closest practical margin, finishing above Melbourne on the ladder by 0.3 percentage points; had Melbourne scored just one more point during the season, it would have won the minor premiership.

== Coach departures ==
Outgoing coach	Club	Manner of departure	Date of departure	Incoming coach	Date of appointment
Trent Cooper	Fremantle	Contract not renewed	7 November 2022	Lisa Webb	10 February 2023
Daniel Harford	Carlton	Parted ways following club review	31 January 2023	Mathew Buck	4 April 2023

== Awards ==
=== Major awards ===
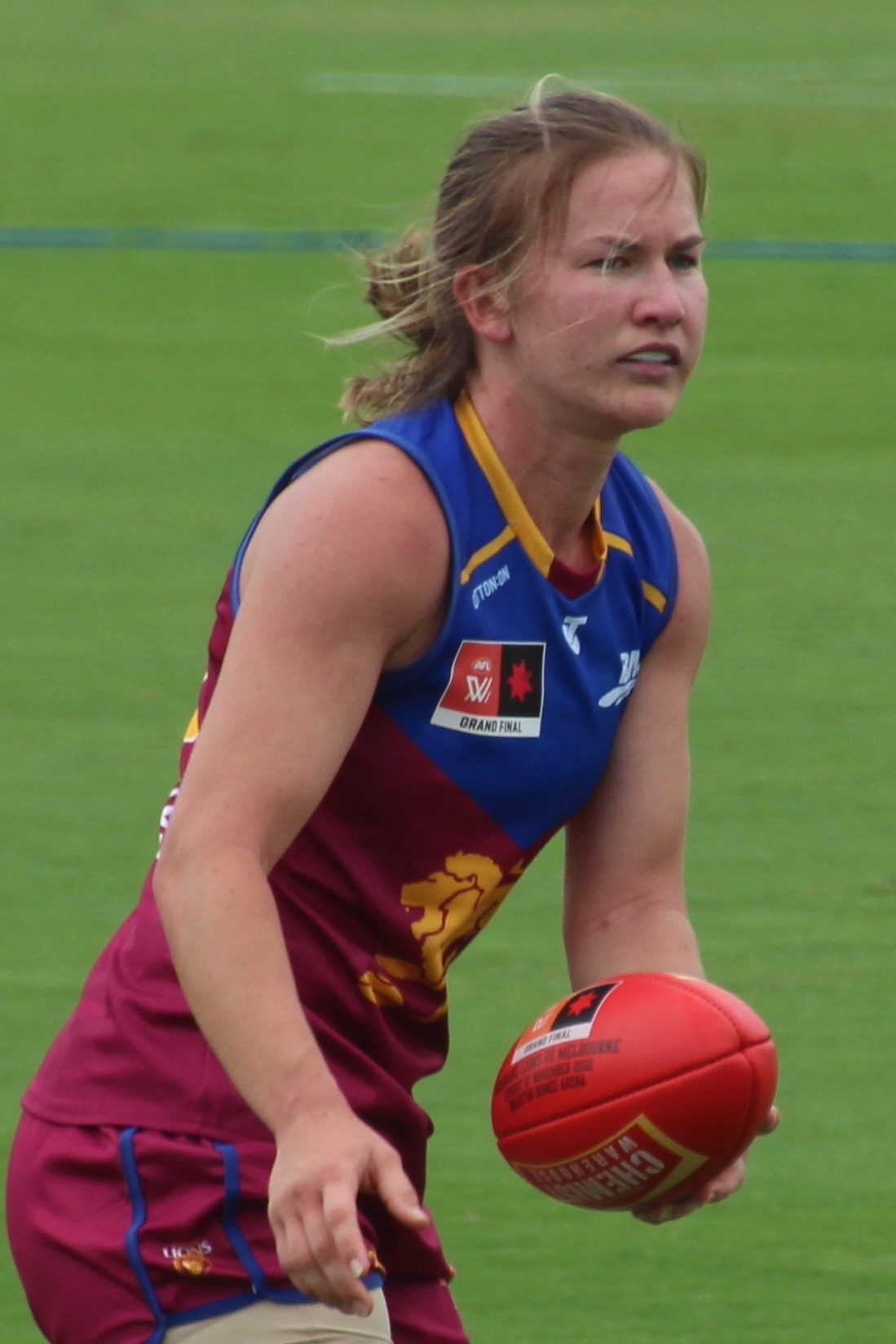
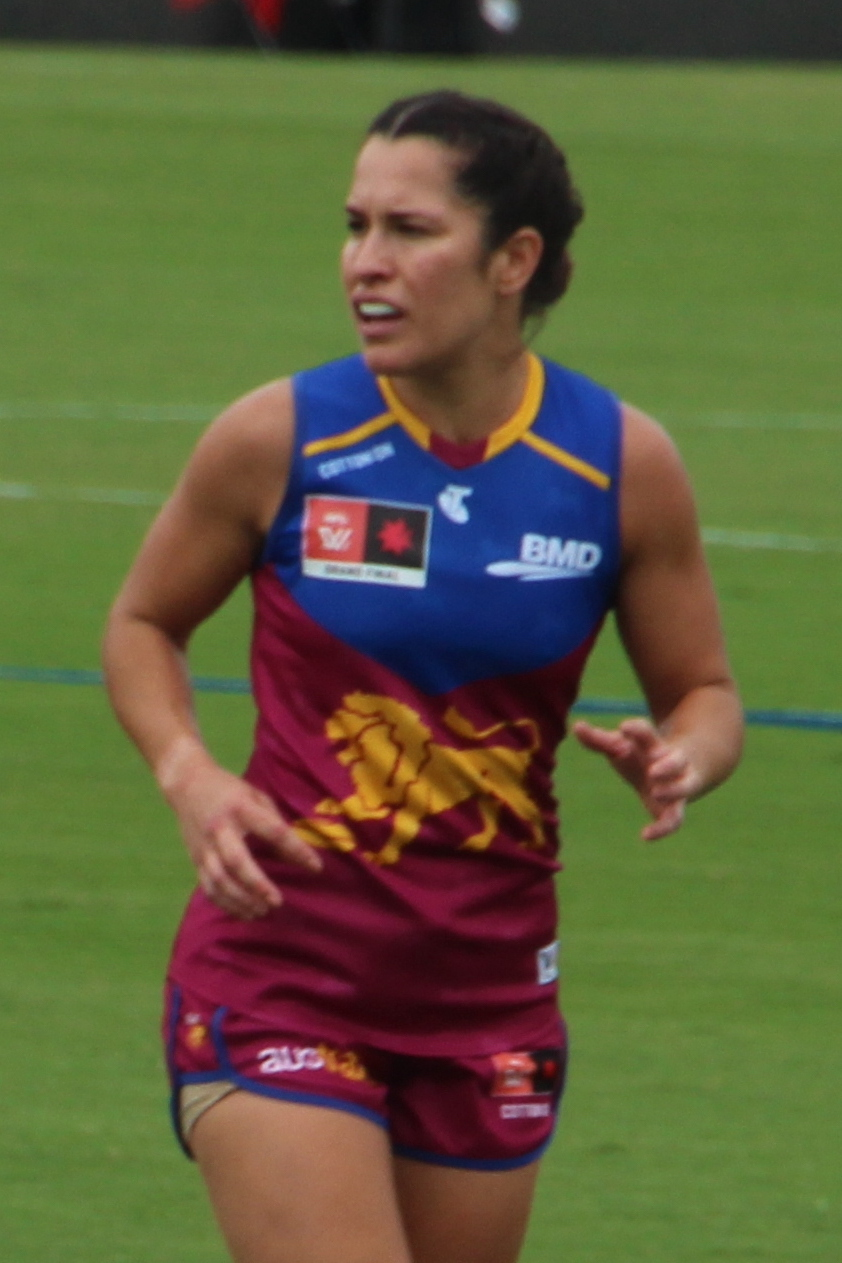
Brisbane players Shannon Campbell (left) and Ally Anderson (right) won the grand final best-on-ground and league best and fairest awards, respectively
- The AFL Women's Grand Final best-on-ground medal was awarded to Brisbane's Shannon Campbell, who became the first player to win the award in a losing team.
- The AFL Women's best and fairest was awarded to Brisbane's Ally Anderson.
- The AFLPA most valuable player was awarded to Richmond's Monique Conti; Adelaide captain Chelsea Randall was voted as best captain and most courageous player, while Richmond's Eilish Sheerin was voted as best first-year player.
- The AFLCA AFLW champion player of the year was awarded to North Melbourne's Jasmine Garner; Brisbane coach Craig Starcevich was voted as coach of the year.
- The AFL Women's All-Australian team was announced on 22 November; Garner was named captain, while Brisbane captain Breanna Koenen was named vice-captain. North Melbourne captain Emma Kearney was selected for the seventh consecutive season. Anderson was not selected, becoming the first AFLW player to win the league best and fairest award but miss All-Australian selection in the same season.
- The AFL Women's leading goalkicker was awarded to Brisbane's Jesse Wardlaw.
- The AFL Women's Rising Star was awarded to Port Adelaide's Hannah Ewings.
- The Goal of the Year was awarded to Gold Coast's Ashanti Bush.
- The Mark of the Year was awarded to Geelong's Chloe Scheer.

=== Leading goalkickers ===
1	Led the goalkicking at the end of the round
1	Led the goalkicking at the end of the home-and-away season
1_{1}	Subscript indicates the player's goal tally to that point of the season
–	Did not play during that round
X	Had a bye during that round

#	Player	Team	Home-and-away season (AFL Women's leading goalkicker)										Finals series				Total	Games	Average
#	Player	Team	1	2	3	4	5	6	7	8	9	10	F1	F2	F3	GF	Total	Games	Average
1	Jesse Wardlaw	Brisbane	2_{2}	1_{3}	4_{7}	2_{9}	–_{9}	2_{11}	1_{12}	2_{14}	3_{17}	2_{19}	1_{20}	X_{20}	2_{22}	0_{22}	22	12	1.83
2	Kate Hore	Melbourne	1_{1}	0_{1}	1_{2}	2_{4}	1_{5}	3_{8}	1_{9}	2_{11}	3_{14}	2_{16}	0_{16}	X_{16}	1_{17}	0_{17}	17	13	1.31
3	Courtney Wakefield	Richmond	0_{0}	2_{2}	1_{3}	2_{5}	2_{7}	0_{7}	0_{7}	4_{11}	1_{12}	1_{13}	0_{13}	1_{14}			14	12	1.17
3	Ashleigh Woodland	Adelaide	3_{3}	1_{4}	0_{4}	1_{5}	0_{5}	4_{9}	2_{11}	0_{11}	0_{11}	2_{13}	1_{14}	0_{14}	0_{14}		14	13	1.08
3	Eden Zanker	Melbourne	1_{1}	0_{1}	2_{3}	1_{4}	0_{4}	2_{6}	2_{8}	2_{10}	1_{11}	2_{13}	1_{14}	X_{14}	0_{14}	0_{14}	14	13	1.08
6	Chloe Scheer	Geelong	0_{0}	0_{0}	0_{0}	0_{0}	3_{3}	1_{4}	3_{7}	1_{8}	1_{9}	4_{13}	0_{13}				13	11	1.18
6	Kate Shierlaw	St Kilda	4_{4}	2_{6}	2_{8}	1_{9}	1_{10}	1_{11}	0_{11}	0_{11}	1_{12}	1_{13}					13	10	1.30
8	Tahlia Randall	North Melbourne	3_{3}	0_{3}	0_{3}	0_{3}	1_{4}	3_{7}	0_{7}	1_{8}	2_{10}	0_{10}	0_{10}	1_{11}	1_{12}		12	13	0.92
9	Greta Bodey	Brisbane	2_{2}	2_{4}	3_{7}	0_{7}	0_{7}	1_{8}	1_{9}	1_{10}	1_{11}	0_{11}	0_{11}	X_{11}	0_{11}	0_{11}	11	13	0.85
9	Tayla Harris	Melbourne	1_{1}	0_{1}	0_{1}	–_{1}	3_{4}	1_{5}	2_{7}	3_{10}	0_{10}	0_{10}	0_{10}	X_{10}	0_{10}	1_{11}	11	12	0.92
9	Courtney Hodder	Brisbane	2_{2}	1_{3}	0_{3}	1_{4}	0_{4}	1_{5}	1_{6}	1_{7}	0_{7}	2_{9}	0_{9}	X_{9}	2_{11}	0_{11}	11	13	0.85
9	Danielle Ponter	Adelaide	1_{1}	0_{1}	2_{3}	–_{3}	–_{3}	–_{3}	1_{4}	1_{5}	2_{7}	2_{9}	1_{10}	0_{10}	1_{11}		11	10	1.10
9	Aine Tighe	Fremantle	1_{1}	0_{1}	1_{2}	2_{4}	2_{6}	1_{7}	0_{7}	0_{7}	0_{7}	4_{11}					11	10	1.10

Source: Australian Football

=== Club best and fairest ===
Player	Club	Award	Ref.
Anne Hatchard	Adelaide	Club Champion	
Emily Bates	Brisbane	Best and fairest	
Mimi Hill	Carlton	Best and fairest	
Jordyn Allen	Collingwood	Best and fairest	
Maddy Prespakis	Essendon	Best and fairest	
Kiara Bowers	Fremantle	Fairest and best	
Amy McDonald	Geelong	Best and fairest	
Charlie Rowbottom	Gold Coast	Club Champion	
Alyce Parker	Greater Western Sydney	Gabrielle Trainor Medal	
Tilly Lucas-Rodd	Hawthorn	Best and fairest	
Kate Hore	Melbourne	Best and fairest	
Jasmine Garner	North Melbourne	Best and fairest	
Hannah Ewings	Port Adelaide	Best and fairest	
Monique Conti	Richmond	Best and fairest	
Kate Shierlaw	St Kilda	Best and fairest	
Cynthia Hamilton	Sydney	Club Champion	
Emma Swanson	West Coast	Club Champion	
Ellie Blackburn	Western Bulldogs	Best and fairest	

== See also ==
- 2022 AFL Women's season 6
- 2022 AFL season

== Sources ==
- 2022 AFL Women's season 7 at afl.com.au
- 2022 AFL Women's season 7 at Australian Football
- 2022 AFL Women's season 7 at Austadiums
