= Isabella Grant =

Australian rules footballer (born 2001)

Personal information
- Born: 21 September 2001 (age 25)
- Original team: Western Jets (NAB League Girls)
- Draft: No. 47, 2019 national draft
- Debut: 12 February 2021, Western Bulldogs vs. Geelong, at Kardinia Park
- Height: 175 cm (5 ft 9 in)
- Positions: Midfielder, Forward

Club information
- Current club: Western Bulldogs
- Number: 3

Playing career^{1}
Years	Club	Games (Goals)
2020–	Western Bulldogs	33 (1)
- ^{1} Playing statistics correct to the end of the 2023 season.

Isabella Grant (born 21 September 2001) is an Australian rules footballer playing for Western Bulldogs in the AFL Women's (AFLW). She was drafted with the forty-seventh selection in the 2020 AFL Women's draft by the Western Bulldogs under the father–daughter rule. She was educated at Caulfield Grammar School.

== Early football ==
Grant began her junior career at Spotswood Football Club in the Western Region Football League in 2016. She played in the Under 15 girls division, and then continued playing for the next four years, where she won three premierships and a best and fairest medal, won while playing in the Under 15s division. She kicked 12 goals for her club in 2017, the highest out of anyone playing in the team. She was also nominated for the U18 best and fairest award in 2017. Grant began playing for the Western Jets in the NAB League in 2019. She played 6 games and kicked 1 goal, while averaging 17.2 disposals a game. Grant was named on the half-forward flank in the NAB League girls team of the year for 2019. She represented Vic Metro in the 2019 AFL Women's Under 18 Championships, having a standout game against Vic Country where she kicked 3 goals.

== AFLW career ==
Grant missed out on the 2020 AFL Women's season due to an ongoing foot injury. She debuted in the 3rd round of the 2021 AFL Women's season, where she collected 8 disposals and 1 mark. She only had one more game for the season, before being omitted. It was revealed that Grant had signed a contract extension with the club on 16 June 2021, after playing 2 games with the club that season.

== Personal life ==
She is the daughter of former Western Bulldogs captain Chris Grant. Grant is in a relationship with fellow AFLW player Bella Lewis.

=== Statistics ===
Statistics are correct to the end of the 2021 season.

Legend
G	Goals	K	Kicks	D	Disposals	T	Tackles
B	Behinds	H	Handballs	M	Marks

Season	Team	No.	Games	Totals							Averages (per game)							Votes
Season	Team	No.	Games	G	B	K	H	D	M	T	G	B	K	H	D	M	T	Votes
2020	Western Bulldogs	3	0	—	—	—	—	—	—	—	—	—	—	—	—	—	—	0
2021	Western Bulldogs	3	2	0	0	9	4	13	1	3	0.0	0.0	4.5	2.0	6.5	0.5	1.5	
Career			1	0	0	9	4	13	1	3	0.0	0.0	4.5	2.0	6.5	0.5	1.5	0
