= Western Bulldogs best and fairest (AFL Women's) =

- Awarded for: The best and fairest player of the Western Bulldogs in the AFL Women's
- Country: Australia
- Presented by: Western Bulldogs
- First award: 2017
- Currently held by: Ellie Blackburn

In the AFL Women's (AFLW), the Western Bulldogs best and fairest award is awarded to the best and fairest player at the Western Bulldogs during the home-and-away season. The award has been awarded annually since the competition's inaugural season in 2017, and Ellie Blackburn and Emma Kearney were the joint inaugural winners of the award.

== Recipients ==
**Bold**	Denotes current player
	Player won AFL Women's best and fairest in same season

Season	Recipient(s)	Ref.
2017	**Ellie Blackburn**	
2017	Emma Kearney	
2018	Emma Kearney (2)	
2019	Monique Conti	
2020	Isabel Huntington	
2021	**Ellie Blackburn** (2)	
2022 (S6)	**Ellie Blackburn** (3)	
2022 (S6)	Kirsty Lamb	
2022 (S7)	**Ellie Blackburn** (4)	
2023	**Ellie Blackburn** (5)	
2024	**Isabelle Pritchard**	
2025	**Ellie Blackburn** (6)	

== See also ==
- Charles Sutton Medal (list of Western Bulldogs best and fairest winners in the Australian Football League)
