= Sarah Hartwig =

Australian rules footballer (born 2002)

Personal information
- Full name: Sarah Megan Hartwig
- Born: 12 April 2002 (age 24)
- Original team: Sandringham Dragons (NAB League Girls)
- Draft: No. 11, 2020 national draft
- Debut: 29 January 2021, Western Bulldogs vs. St Kilda, at Moorabbin Oval
- Height: 174 cm (5 ft 9 in)
- Position: Defender / Wing

Club information
- Current club: Western Bulldogs
- Number: 15

Playing career^{1}
Years	Club	Games (Goals)
2021–	Western Bulldogs	38 (11)
- ^{1} Playing statistics correct to the end of the 2023 season.

Sarah Megan Hartwig (born 12 April 2002) is an Australian rules footballer playing for Western Bulldogs in the AFL Women's (AFLW). She was drafted with the eleventh selection in the 2020 AFL Women's draft by the Western Bulldogs.

== Early football ==
Hartwig was eight when she first began playing Australian rules football in the South Metro Junior Football League (SMJFL), where she played with St Peters Junior Football Club, tallying up a total of 86 games over her 9 years at the club. Hartwig would end up becoming one of 7 SMJFL players drafted into the AFL Women's in the 2020 AFL Women's draft. She played in the School Sports Victoria (SSV) National Championships in the Under 15s division. Hartwig came fifth in the SMJFL's best and fairest voting for the Under 18 Girls 1 Division, behind future players Eliza McNamara, Alana Porter and Winnie Laing. She played 2 seasons with the Sandringham Dragons, wearing the 25 guernsey. Hartwig also played 12 games with the Dragons in 2019 and 2020, with 9 of those coming in her junior year due to the impact of the COVID-19 pandemic on her senior playing year. She averaged 13.1 disposals in her junior year, and 15.0 in her senior year. Hartwig represented Vic Metro in the 2019 AFL Women's Under 18 Championships, playing 2 games and averaging 5 disposals a game.

== AFL career ==
When Hartwig was drafted by the Western Bulldogs at pick 11, she was lauded by Bulldogs list manager Mick Sundry, who stated "Sarah's ability to read the ball in the air and intercept mark is elite, she is an athletic defender who likes to run and break the lines, not only proving to be strong in her defensive actions but also in her ability to turn defence into attack." Hartwig debuted in the opening round of the 2021 AFL Women's season, where the Western Bulldogs conceded a nine point defeat to St Kilda. In her first game, she collected 5 disposals and a mark. Hartwig had her best game for the season in the team's upset round 4 win over Melbourne, where she collected 13 disposals, 2 marks and 3 tackles to form a crucial part of the team's backline. It was revealed that Hartwig had signed a contract extension with the club on 16 June 2021, after playing every game possible for the club that season.

== Statistics ==
Statistics are correct to the end of the 2021 season.

Legend
G	Goals	K	Kicks	D	Disposals	T	Tackles
B	Behinds	H	Handballs	M	Marks

Season	Team	No.	Games	Totals							Averages (per game)							Votes
Season	Team	No.	Games	G	B	K	H	D	M	T	G	B	K	H	D	M	T	Votes
2021	Western Bulldogs	15	9	0	0	44	30	74	13	17	0.0	0.0	4.9	3.3	8.2	1.4	1.9	
Career			9	0	0	44	30	74	13	17	0.0	0.0	4.9	3.3	8.2	1.4	1.9	0
