= Elisabeth Georgostathis =

Female Australian rules footballer

Personal information
- Full name: Elisabeth Georgostathis
- Born: 17 October 2001 (age 25)
- Original team: Western Jets (NAB League)
- Draft: No. 9, 2019 national draft
- Debut: Round 1, 2020, Western Bulldogs vs. St Kilda, at RSEA Park
- Height: 162 cm (5 ft 4 in)
- Position: Forward

Club information
- Current club: Western Bulldogs
- Number: 17

Playing career^{1}
Years	Club	Games (Goals)
2020–	Western Bulldogs	44 (4)
- ^{1} Playing statistics correct to the end of the 2023 season.

Elisabeth Georgostathis (born 17 October 2001) is an Australian rules footballer who plays for Western Bulldogs in the AFL Women's (AFLW). It was revealed that Georgostathis had signed a contract extension with the club on 16 June 2021, after playing every game possible for the club that season.

== Statistics ==
Statistics are correct to the end of the 2021 season.

Legend
G	Goals	K	Kicks	D	Disposals	T	Tackles
B	Behinds	H	Handballs	M	Marks

Season	Team	No.	Games	Totals							Averages (per game)							Votes
Season	Team	No.	Games	G	B	K	H	D	M	T	G	B	K	H	D	M	T	Votes
2020	Western Bulldogs	17	6	1	1	35	12	47	5	21	0.2	0.2	5.8	2.0	7.8	0.8	3.5	0
2021	Western Bulldogs	17	3	1	0	47	39	86	14	40	0.1	0.0	5.2	4.3	9.6	1.6	4.4	0
Career			15	2	1	82	51	133	19	61	0.1	0.1	5.5	3.4	8.9	1.3	4.1	0
