= Ashleigh Guest =

Australian rules footballer (born 1990)

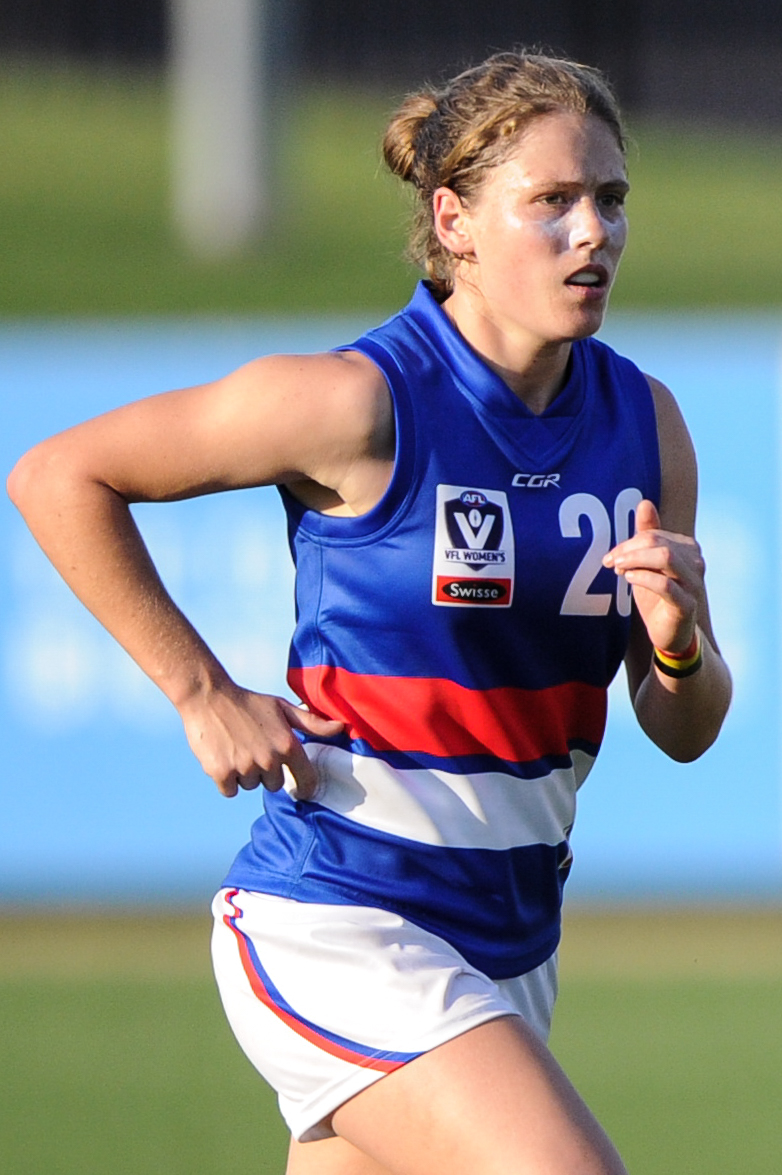
- Guest in June 2018

Personal information
- Born: 10 April 1990 (age 36)
- Original team: VU Western Spurs (VFL Women's)
- Draft: No. 16, 2016 AFL Women's draft
- Debut: Round 1, 2017, Greater Western Sydney vs. Adelaide, at Thebarton Oval
- Height: 168 cm (5 ft 6 in)
- Position: Utility

Playing career^{1}
Years	Club	Games (Goals)
2017	Greater Western Sydney	7 (0)
2018–2019	Melbourne	11 (0)
2020–2022 (S6)	Western Bulldogs	22 (0)
Total		40 (0)
- ^{1} Playing statistics correct to the end of 2022 season 6.

Ashleigh Guest (born 10 April 1990) is a retired Australian rules footballer who played for Greater Western Sydney, Melbourne, and the Western Bulldogs in the AFL Women's (AFLW). Guest was drafted by the Greater Western Sydney Giants with their second selection and sixteenth overall in the 2016 AFL Women's draft. She made her debut in the thirty-six point loss to Adelaide at Thebarton Oval in the opening round of the 2017 season. She played every match in her debut season to finish with seven games. She was traded to the Melbourne Football Club at the conclusion of the 2017 season.

In April 2019, Guest was traded to the Western Bulldogs while Libby Birch joined Melbourne. It was revealed that Guest had signed a contract extension with the club on 16 June 2021, after playing every game possible for the club that season.

In May 2022, Guest retired from football after playing 40 games with three clubs.

== Statistics ==
Legend
G	Goals	K	Kicks	D	Disposals	T	Tackles
B	Behinds	H	Handballs	M	Marks

Season	Team	No.	Games	Totals							Averages (per game)							Votes
Season	Team	No.	Games	G	B	K	H	D	M	T	G	B	K	H	D	M	T	Votes
2017	Greater Western Sydney	19	7	1	0	46	22	68	13	29	0.0	0.0	6.6	3.1	9.7	1.9	4.1	0
2018	Melbourne	17	7	0	0	29	20	49	7	20	0.0	0.0	4.1	2.9	7.0	1.0	2.9	0
2019	Melbourne	17	4	0	0	10	12	22	3	8	0.0	0.0	2.5	3.0	5.5	0.8	2.0	0
2020	Western Bulldogs	19	3	0	0	13	10	23	6	6	0.0	0.0	4.3	3.3	7.7	2.0	2.0	0
2021	Western Bulldogs	19	9	0	0	70	22	92	23	15	0.0	0.0	7.8	2.4	10.2	2.6	1.7	0
2022 (S6)	Western Bulldogs	19	10	0	0	65	42	107	24	14	0.0	0.0	6.5	4.2	10.7	2.4	1.4	0
Career			40	0	0	233	128	361	76	92	0.0	0.0	5.8	3.2	9.0	1.9	2.3	0
