= Ellie Blackburn =

Australian rules footballer

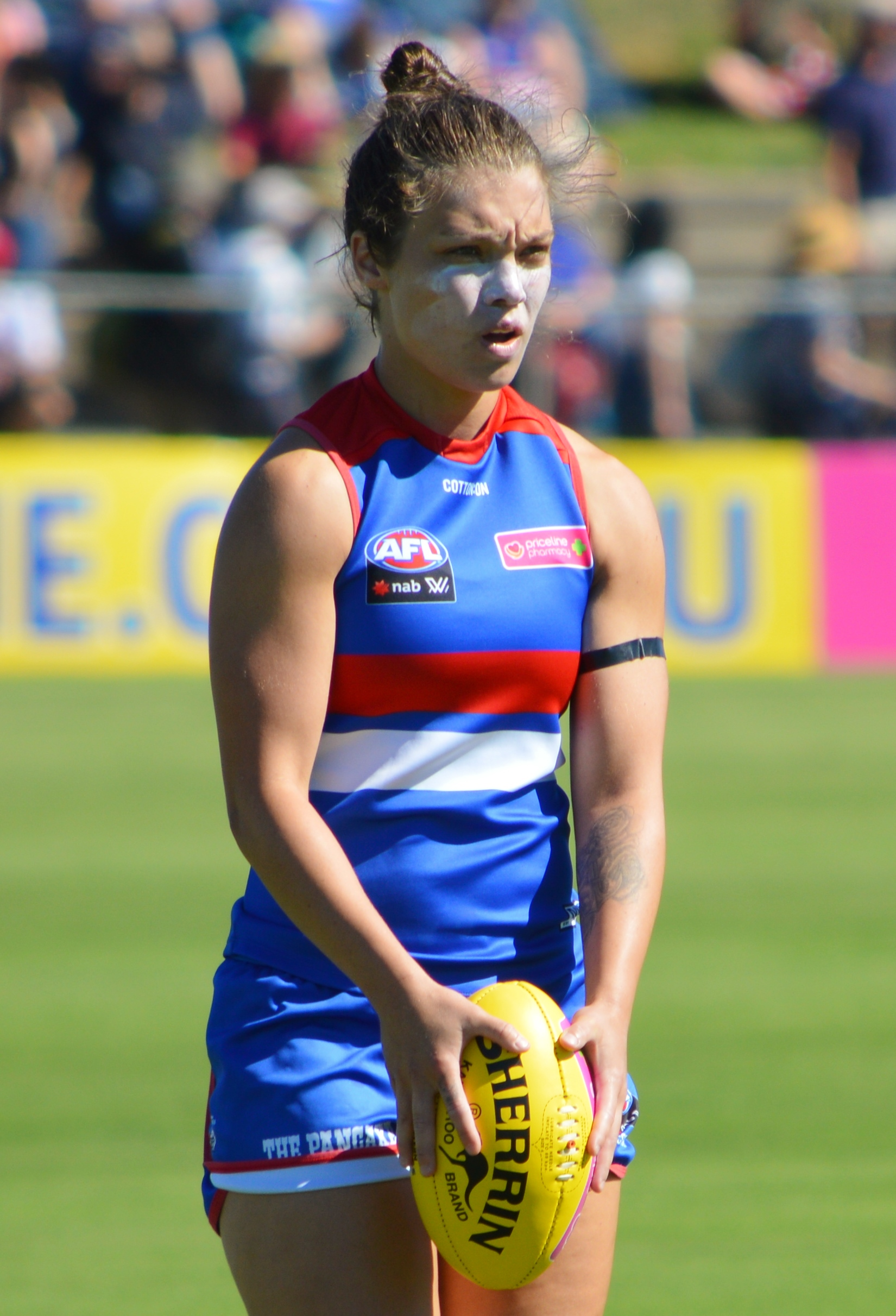
- Blackburn playing for the Western Bulldogs in 2018

Personal information
- Full name: Ellie Blackburn
- Born: 25 March 1995 (age 31)
- Original team: Melbourne University (VFLW)
- Draft: 2016 marquee signing
- Debut: Round 1, 2017, Western Bulldogs vs. Fremantle, at VU Whitten Oval
- Height: 169 cm (5 ft 7 in)
- Position: Midfielder / forward

Club information
- Current club: Western Bulldogs
- Number: 2

Playing career^{1}
Years	Club	Games (Goals)
2017–	Western Bulldogs	83 (37)

Representative team honours
Years	Team	Games (Goals)
2017	Victoria	1 (3)
- ^{1} Playing statistics correct to the end of the 2025 season.

Career highlights
- AFL Women's premiership player: 2018 (c); Western Bulldogs co-captain: 2019; captain: 2020–2023; Western Bulldogs games record holder; Western Bulldogs goalkicking record holder; 3× AFL Women's All-Australian team: 2017, 2018, 2021; 6× Western Bulldogs best and fairest: 2017, 2021, S6, S7, 2023, 2025; Western Bulldogs leading goalkicker: 2017; AFLPA AFLW best captain: 2021

Ellie Blackburn (born 25 March 1995) is an Australian rules footballer playing for the Western Bulldogs in the AFL Women's (AFLW). She served as Western Bulldogs co-captain in 2019, and as their sole captain from 2020 to 2023. Blackburn is the Bulldogs' games record holder with 83 games and goalkicking record holder with 37 goals.

Blackburn was drafted by the Bulldogs in 2016 as a marquee signing prior to the inaugural AFL Women's season, and is a three-time AFL Women's All-Australian and six-time Western Bulldogs best and fairest. In 2017, she was the inaugural Western Bulldogs leading goalkicker, and in 2018, she captained the Bulldogs to their first AFL Women's premiership in the absence of suspended captain Katie Brennan. Blackburn was also voted as the AFL Players Association (AFLPA) AFLW best captain in 2021.

== Early life ==
Blackburn began playing competitive football in the under-9s division for the Beaconsfield Junior Football Club. 2011 saw her named player of the carnival at the national under-18 championships. In 2013, she was the captain of the Victorian side at the under 18 championships, where she was named the competition's best-and-fairest player. She was awarded under 18 All-Australian selection in 2011, 2012, and her final year of eligibility in 2013.

She attended high school at Hallam Senior College in Melbourne's outer east. Blackburn played state football for Melbourne University in the VFL Women's (VFLW). She was drafted by Melbourne with the thirteenth pick in the inaugural women's draft in 2013 and represented the club in the women's exhibition games between 2013 and 2016. Over this time she averaged 20 disposals per match for the club. In July 2016, Blackburn was signed by the Western Bulldogs – the team that she played against in all of the exhibition matches – as one of two marquee players ahead of the inaugural AFL Women's season.

== AFL Women's career ==
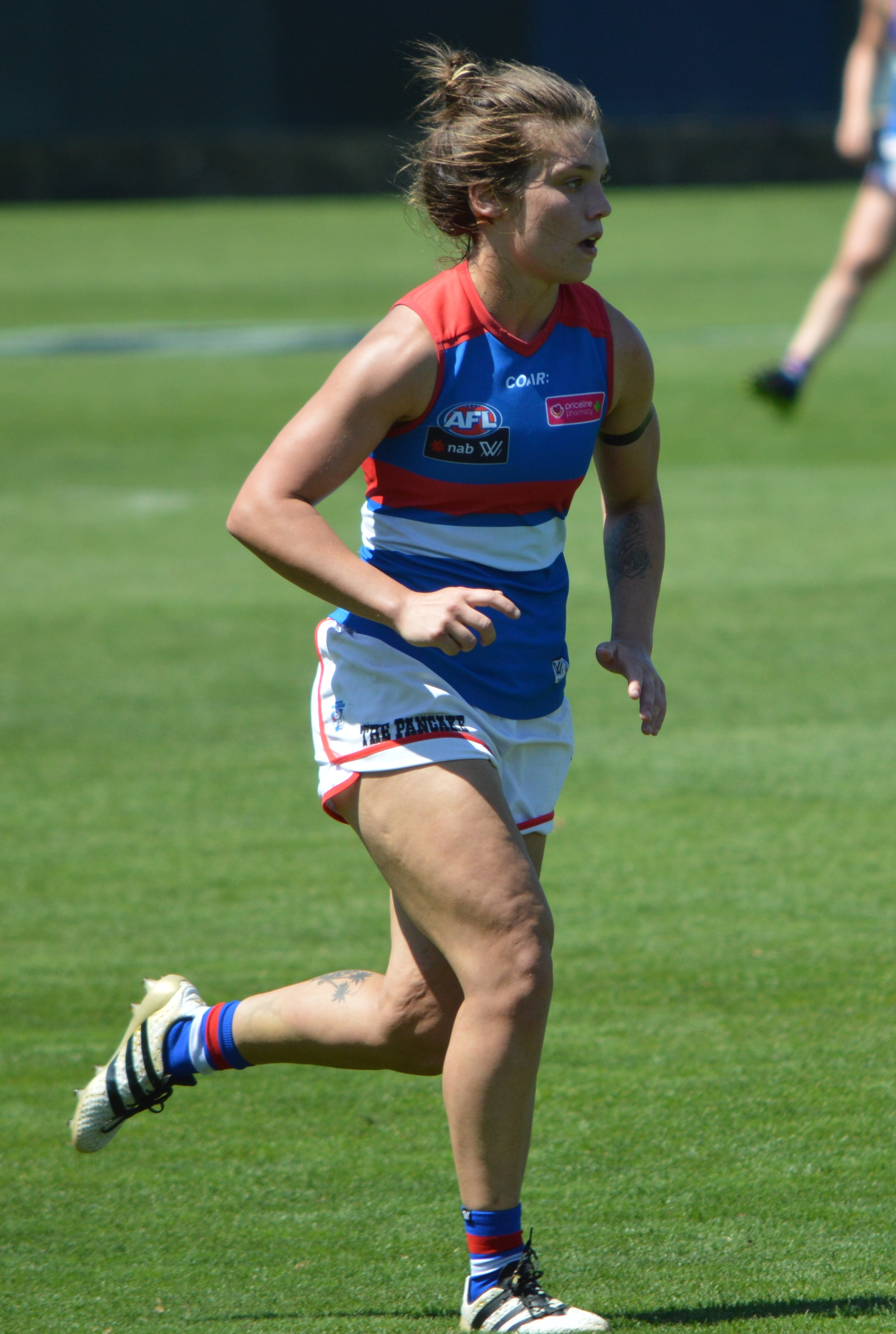
Blackburn playing for the Western Bulldogs in 2017

Blackburn was announced as a member of the Bulldogs' inaugural four-woman leadership group in late January 2017. Blackburn made her debut in round 1, 2017, against Fremantle at Whitten Oval. She was named among the Bulldogs' best, recording twelve disposals and kicking her first league goal in the match. In round 3, Blackburn was named the Bulldogs' best, recording a team high twenty-six disposals and six tackles for the match. Blackburn was highlighted as "Player of the Week" by the AFL Players Association for her round 5 performance in the 2017 AFL Women's season. At the end of the season, Blackburn was second in the competition for kicks, one behind Melbourne's Karen Paxman. Teammates also spoke highly of her leadership after she captained the team for majority of the season, with captain Katie Brennan injured. At the end of the 2017 season, Blackburn was nominated by her teammates for the AFL Players' Most Valuable Player Award and was listed in the 2017 AFL Women's All-Australian team. In May 2017, she was announced as the co-winner of the inaugural Western Bulldogs best and fairest award alongside Emma Kearney. The Western Bulldogs signed Blackburn for the 2018 season during the trade period in May 2017. On 2 September, Blackburn played for Victoria in the inaugural AFL Women's State of Origin match, where she was named among Victoria's best players with three goals.

In round 4 of the 2019 season, Blackburn was knocked out in a collision and stretchered off the ground in a neck brace.

Leading into the 2020 season, womens.afl journalist Sarah Black named Blackburn at no. 10 on her list of the top 30 players in the AFLW. Despite suffering a hand injury in a practice match, she was able to play in round 1, and was selected in womens.afl's Team of the Week for that round. Blackburn was selected in the initial 40-woman squad for the 2020 AFL Women's All-Australian team, and was also selected in the AFL Players Association's 2017–2019 retrospective AFL Women's 22under22 team.

Leading into the 2021 season, Sarah Black again named Blackburn at no. 10 on her annual list of the top 30 players in the AFLW. Blackburn was best afield in each of the Bulldogs' first three matches and was selected in womens.afl's Team of the Week in each of the first three rounds, making her one of only two players (along with Greater Western Sydney's Alyce Parker) to do so. She also received a Goal of the Year nomination for her goal in the final quarter of the round 1 match. At the end of the home-and-away season, Blackburn was voted as the AFLW Players' best captain for 2021 ahead of Melbourne captain and three-time winner Daisy Pearce, and also finished third in voting for the AFLW Players' most valuable player award behind Collingwood co-captain Brianna Davey and Fremantle midfielder Kiara Bowers. She also finished equal-third with Parker in the 2021 AFL Women's best and fairest count with 14 votes, one behind joint winners Davey and Bowers, and won her third AFL Women's All-Australian selection and second Western Bulldogs best and fairest award. Blackburn signed a contract extension with the club in June 2021.

Blackburn was named at no. 4 in Sarah Black's 2022 list of the top 30 players in the AFLW, which was Blackburn's first appearance in the top five. She was named the Bulldogs' best player in their opening round loss to Melbourne, before being ruled out of the following round due to the AFL's health and safety protocols, which would have been the first time she missed a match for the club. However, the Bulldogs' next two matches were postponed as a result of the protocols, and Blackburn played in the Bulldogs' next match, a loss to Greater Western Sydney in round 4; she was named among their best players with twelve disposals, eight tackles and a goal, with coach Nathan Burke saying that she only spent two minutes in the midfield in the second half of the match after "[running] herself ragged", as one of several players who had played underdone after having COVID-19. Blackburn was again named among the Bulldogs' best players in their loss to Fremantle a few days later and was best afield in the Bulldogs' first win of the season against Richmond in round 5, polling eight coaches' votes. She was also best afield in the Bulldogs' one-point win over Adelaide in round 6 with 23 disposals and a goal, polling nine coaches' votes, and was selected in womens.afl's Team of the Week for that round. Blackburn was among the Bulldogs' best players in their win over Geelong and draw against Gold Coast in round 7, and was the Bulldogs' best player in their loss to Collingwood in round 8. She was among the Bulldogs' best players in their win over West Coast in round 9 and loss to Brisbane in round 10, polling nine coaches' votes in round 9 and five in round 10.

Leading into the 2023 season, Sarah Black named Blackburn at no. 18 on her annual list of the top 30 players in the AFLW.

In 2024, Blackburn was named the Bulldogs' best player in losses to Greater Western Sydney in round 1 and Port Adelaide in round 2. She was among the Bulldogs' best players in their round 3 loss to West Coast with 21 disposals and a goal, but suffered a mid-foot ligament injury late in the match which required surgery, ruling her out for the rest of the season and marking the first time Blackburn missed an AFLW match in her career. After the extent of the injury was revealed during the initial surgery, Blackburn required further surgery later in the year to remove a plate, effectively restarting her recovery.

== Statistics ==
Updated to the end of the 2025 season.

Legend
G	Goals	K	Kicks	D	Disposals	T	Tackles
B	Behinds	H	Handballs	M	Marks
#	Played in that season's premiership team	†	Led the league for the season

Season	Team	No.	Games	Totals							Averages (per game)							Votes
Season	Team	No.	Games	G	B	K	H	D	M	T	G	B	K	H	D	M	T	Votes
2017	Western Bulldogs	2	7	6	12^{†}	101	35	136	17	26	0.9	1.7^{†}	14.4	5.0	19.4	2.4	3.7	10
2018^{#}	Western Bulldogs	2	8	3	6	102	33	135	23	26	0.4	0.9	12.8	4.1	16.9	2.9	3.3	6
2019	Western Bulldogs	2	7	2	3	86	35	121	19	27	0.3	0.4	12.3	5.0	17.3	2.7	3.9	6
2020	Western Bulldogs	2	6	2	2	72	32	104	13	25	0.3	0.3	12.0	5.3	17.3	2.2	4.2	6
2021	Western Bulldogs	2	9	5	4	124	52	176	35	48	0.6	0.4	13.8	5.8	19.6	3.9	5.3	14
2022 (S6)	Western Bulldogs	2	10	6	8	135	66	201	23	43	0.6	0.8	13.5	6.6	20.1	2.3	4.3	12
2022 (S7)	Western Bulldogs	2	11	4	7	152	63	215	28	58	0.4	0.6	13.8	5.7	19.5	2.5	5.3	14
2023	Western Bulldogs	2	10	0	4	157	111	268	45	43	0.0	0.4	15.7	11.1	26.8	4.5	4.3	10
2024	Western Bulldogs	2	3	1	2	44	28	72	4	19	0.3	0.7	14.7	9.3	24.0	1.3	6.3	1
2025	Western Bulldogs	2	12	8	10	136	79	215	26	38	0.7	0.8	11.3	6.6	17.9	2.2	3.2	5
Career			83	37	58	1109	534	1643	233	353	0.4	0.7	13.4	6.4	19.8	2.8	4.3	84

== Honours and achievements ==
Team

- AFL Women's premiership player (Western Bulldogs): 2018 (c)
- AFL Women's minor premiership (Western Bulldogs): 2018

Individual

- Western Bulldogs co-captain: 2019; captain: 2020–2023
- Western Bulldogs games record holder
- Western Bulldogs goalkicking record holder
- 3× AFL Women's All-Australian team: 2017, 2018, 2021
- 6× Western Bulldogs best and fairest: 2017, 2021, S6, S7, 2023, 2025
- Western Bulldogs leading goalkicker: 2017
- AFLPA AFLW best captain: 2021
- Victoria representative honours in AFL Women's State of Origin: 2017
