= Nicole Callinan =

Australian rules footballer (born 1982)

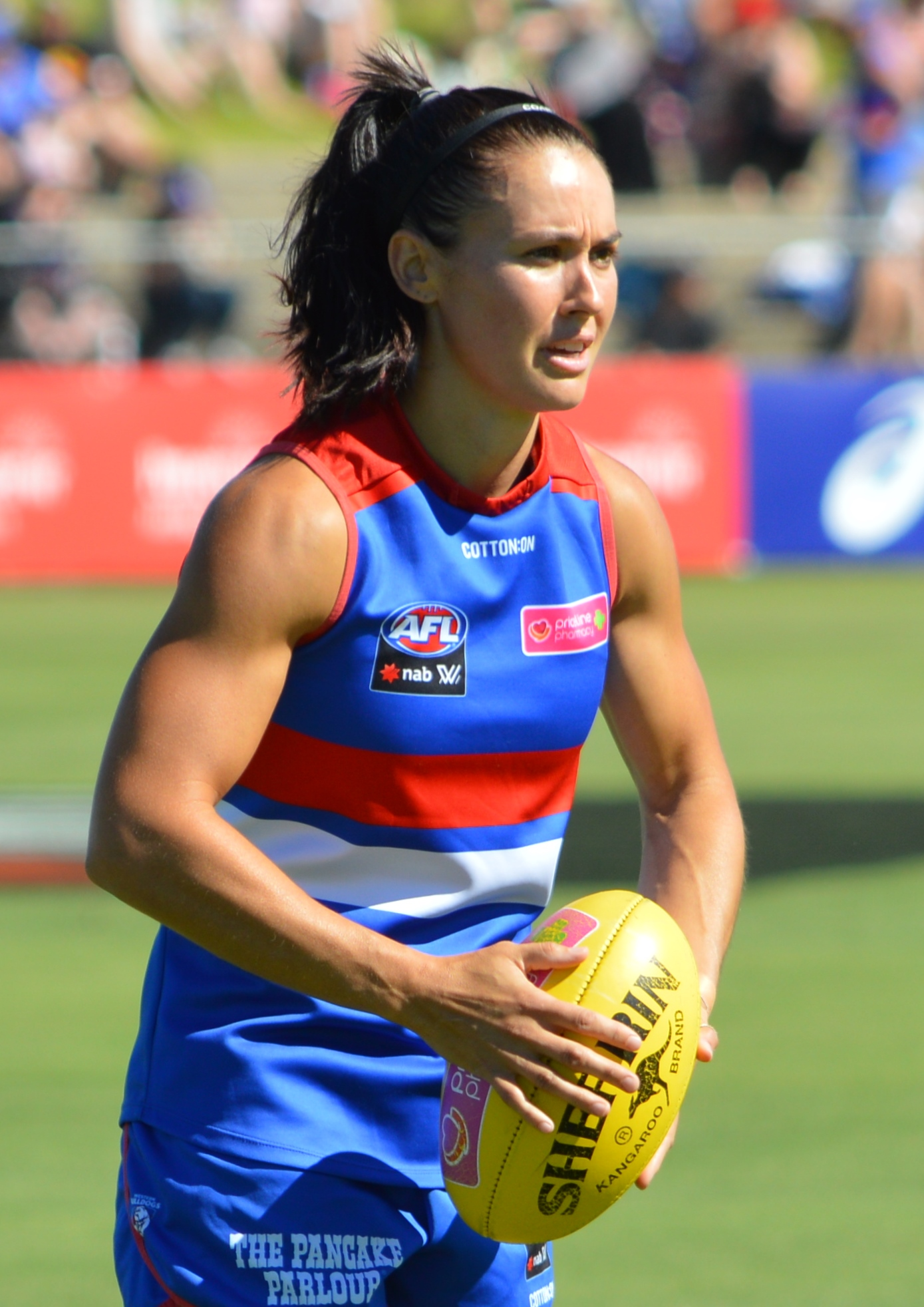
- Callinan playing for the Western Bulldogs in February 2018

Personal information
- Born: 26 December 1982 (age 43)
- Original team: Darebin Falcons (VFL Women's)
- Draft: No. 85, 2016 AFL Women's draft
- Debut: Round 1, 2017, Western Bulldogs vs. Fremantle, at VU Whitten Oval
- Height: 164 cm (5 ft 5 in)
- Position: Midfielder

Playing career^{1}
Years	Club	Games (Goals)
2017–2020	Western Bulldogs	24 (1)
- ^{1} Playing statistics correct to the end of the 2020 season.

Nicole Callinan (born 26 December 1982) is an Australian rules footballer playing for the Western Bulldogs in the AFL Women's competition. Callinan was drafted by the Western Bulldogs with their eleventh selection and eighty-fifth overall in the 2016 AFL Women's draft. She made her debut in the thirty-two point win against Fremantle at VU Whitten Oval in the opening round of the 2017 season. She played every match in her debut season to finish with seven games.
