= Gemma Lagioia =

Female Australian rules footballer

Personal information
- Full name: Gemma Lagioia
- Born: 3 May 2001 (age 25)
- Original team: Oakleigh Chargers (NAB League)
- Draft: No. 8, 2019 national draft
- Debut: Round 1, 2020, Western Bulldogs vs. St Kilda, at RSEA Park
- Height: 160 cm (5 ft 3 in)
- Position: Midfielder

Club information
- Current club: Western Bulldogs
- Number: 12

Playing career^{1}
Years	Club	Games (Goals)
2020–	Western Bulldogs	26 (0)
- ^{1} Playing statistics correct to the end of the 2023 season.

Gemma Lagioia (born 3 May 2001) is an Australian rules footballer who plays for Western Bulldogs in the AFL Women's (AFLW). It was revealed that Lagioia had signed a contract extension with the club on 16 June 2021, after playing 4 games for the club that season.

Lagioia is currently studying a Bachelor of Exercise and Sport Science at Deakin University.

== Statistics ==
Statistics are correct to the end of the 2021 season.

Legend
G	Goals	K	Kicks	D	Disposals	T	Tackles
B	Behinds	H	Handballs	M	Marks

Season	Team	No.	Games	Totals							Averages (per game)							Votes
Season	Team	No.	Games	G	B	K	H	D	M	T	G	B	K	H	D	M	T	Votes
2020	Western Bulldogs	12	6	0	1	32	20	52	9	5	0.0	0.2	5.3	3.3	8.7	1.5	0.8	0
2021	Western Bulldogs	12	4	0	0	18	9	27	8	2	0.0	0.0	4.5	2.3	6.8	2.0	0.5	0
Career			10	0	1	50	29	79	17	7	0.0	0.1	5.0	2.9	7.9	1.7	0.7	0
