= 2018 AFL Women's Rising Star =

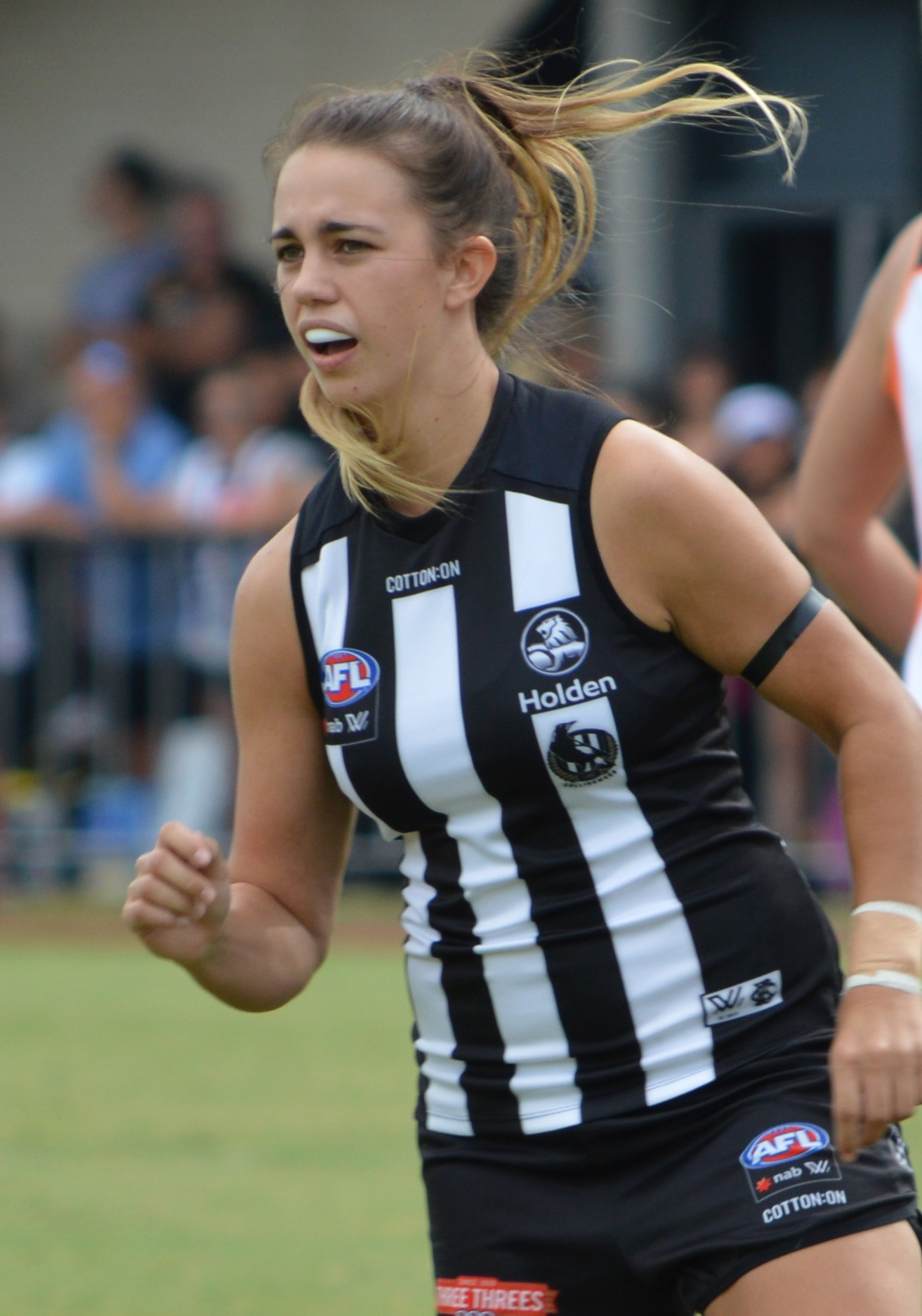
- Chloe Molloy, 2018 winner
- Sponsored by: National Australia Bank
- Date: 27 March 2018
- Location: Peninsula, Docklands
- Reward(s): $20,000
- Winner: Chloe Molloy (Collingwood)

The AFL Women's Rising Star is an Australian rules football award given annually to the best young player in the AFL Women's (AFLW) for the year. Two eligible players are nominated each round of the home-and-away season; the players must have been under 21 at the beginning of the year and cannot have been previously nominated. Players suspended during the year cannot win. After the season's completion, an expert panel votes on the recipient.

National Australia Bank continued its sponsorship of the award in 2018, offering $20,000 in prize money. The winner was announced at the AFLW's awards ceremony on 27 March, held at Peninsula, an event space in Docklands, Melbourne, and live-streamed on AFL.com.au. The ten members of the voting panel were Australian Football League (AFL) officials Nicole Livingstone, who served as the chair, Steve Hocking, Josh Vanderloo and Grant Williams; AFL Victoria's Darren Flanigan; Tim Harrington of the AFL Players Association (AFLPA); St Kilda's Peta Searle; and media commentators Sharelle McMahon, Kelli Underwood and Shelley Ware.

The winner was Chloe Molloy, a defender playing for Collingwood, who was the first recipient to poll the maximum 50 votes. Molloy also won the AFLPA's inaugural award for the AFLW's best first-year player, as voted by her peers; was named Collingwood's best and fairest overall and best first-year player; finished equal-second in the AFLW best and fairest behind Emma Kearney; and was named in the back pocket of the All-Australian team. The Western Bulldogs accrued the most nominations during the season, with five players (Libby Birch, Monique Conti, Naomi Ferres, Bonnie Toogood and Aisling Utri) selected.

== Nominations ==
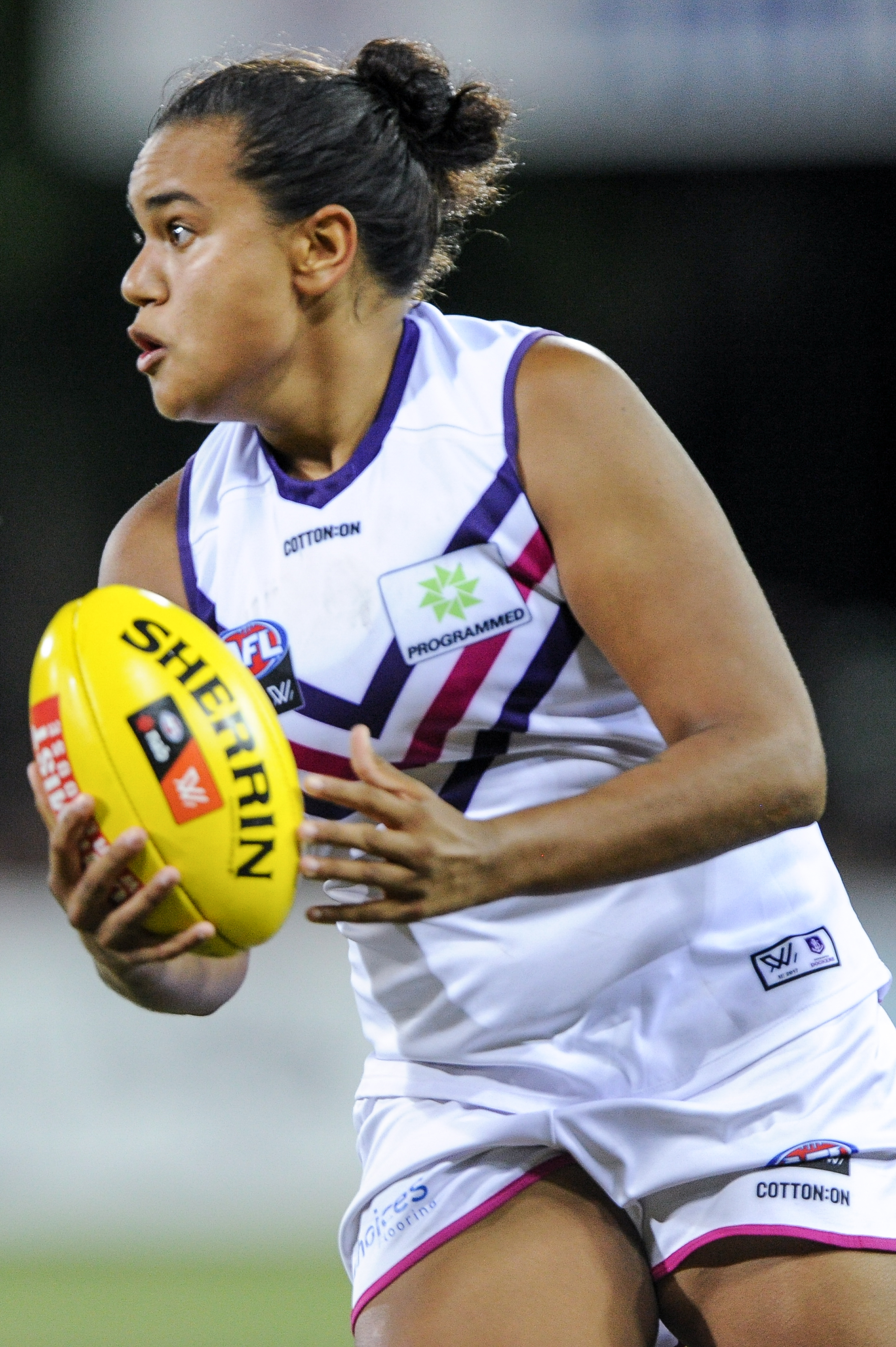
Emily McGuire was Fremantle's sole nominee.

Table of nominees
Round	Player	Club	Ref.
1	Rebecca Beeson	Greater Western Sydney	
1	Chloe Molloy	Collingwood	
2	Libby Birch	Western Bulldogs	
2	Bonnie Toogood	Western Bulldogs	
3	Sophie Conway	Brisbane	
3	Emily McGuire	Fremantle	
4	Monique Conti	Western Bulldogs	
4	Aisling Utri	Western Bulldogs	
5	Eloise Jones	Adelaide	
5	Breann Moody	Carlton	
6	Sarah Allan	Adelaide	
6	Tahlia Randall	Brisbane	
7	Naomi Ferres	Western Bulldogs	
7	Anne Hatchard	Adelaide	

Table of nominations by club
Number	Club	Player	Nom.
5	Western Bulldogs	Libby Birch	2
5	Western Bulldogs	Bonnie Toogood	2
5	Western Bulldogs	Monique Conti	4
5	Western Bulldogs	Aisling Utri	4
5	Western Bulldogs	Naomi Ferres	7
3	Adelaide	Eloise Jones	5
3	Adelaide	Sarah Allan	6
3	Adelaide	Anne Hatchard	7
2	Brisbane	Sophie Conway	3
2	Brisbane	Tahlia Randall	6
1	Carlton	Breann Moody	5
1	Collingwood	Chloe Molloy	1
1	Fremantle	Emily McGuire	3
1	Greater Western Sydney	Rebecca Beeson	1

== Final voting ==
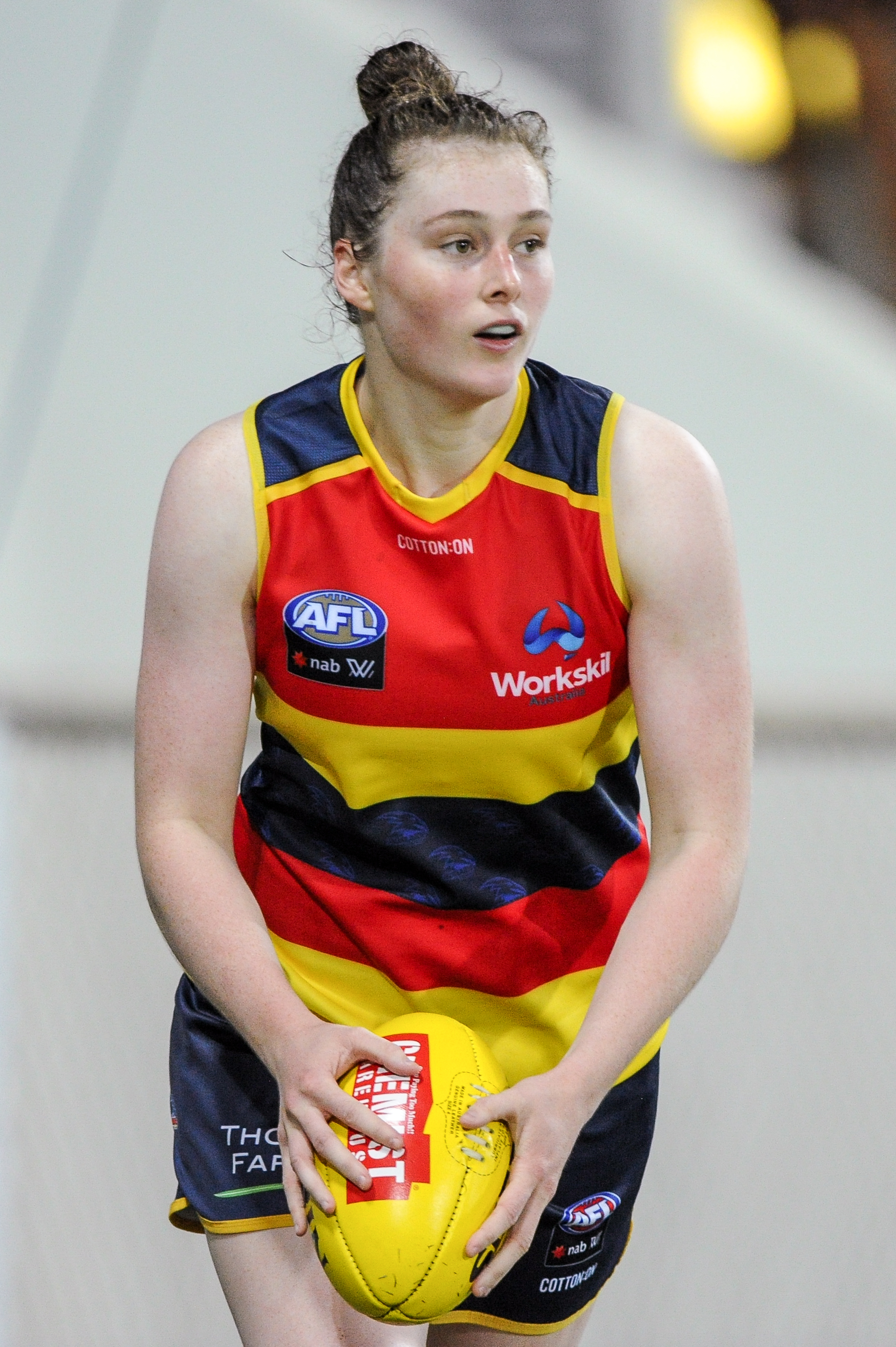
Adelaide's Sarah Allan finished third, polling 15 votes.

Table of votes
Placing	Player	Club	Nom.	Votes
1	Chloe Molloy	Collingwood	1	50
2	Monique Conti	Western Bulldogs	4	39
3	Sarah Allan	Adelaide	6	15
4	Bonnie Toogood	Western Bulldogs	2	12
5	Breann Moody	Carlton	5	10
6	Tahlia Randall	Brisbane	6	8
7	Aisling Utri	Western Bulldogs	4	6
8	Libby Birch	Western Bulldogs	2	3
8	Eloise Jones	Adelaide	5	3
10	Rebecca Beeson	Greater Western Sydney	1	2
10	Sophie Conway	Brisbane	3	2

== See also ==
- 2018 AFL Rising Star
