= Tahlia Randall =

Australian rules footballer

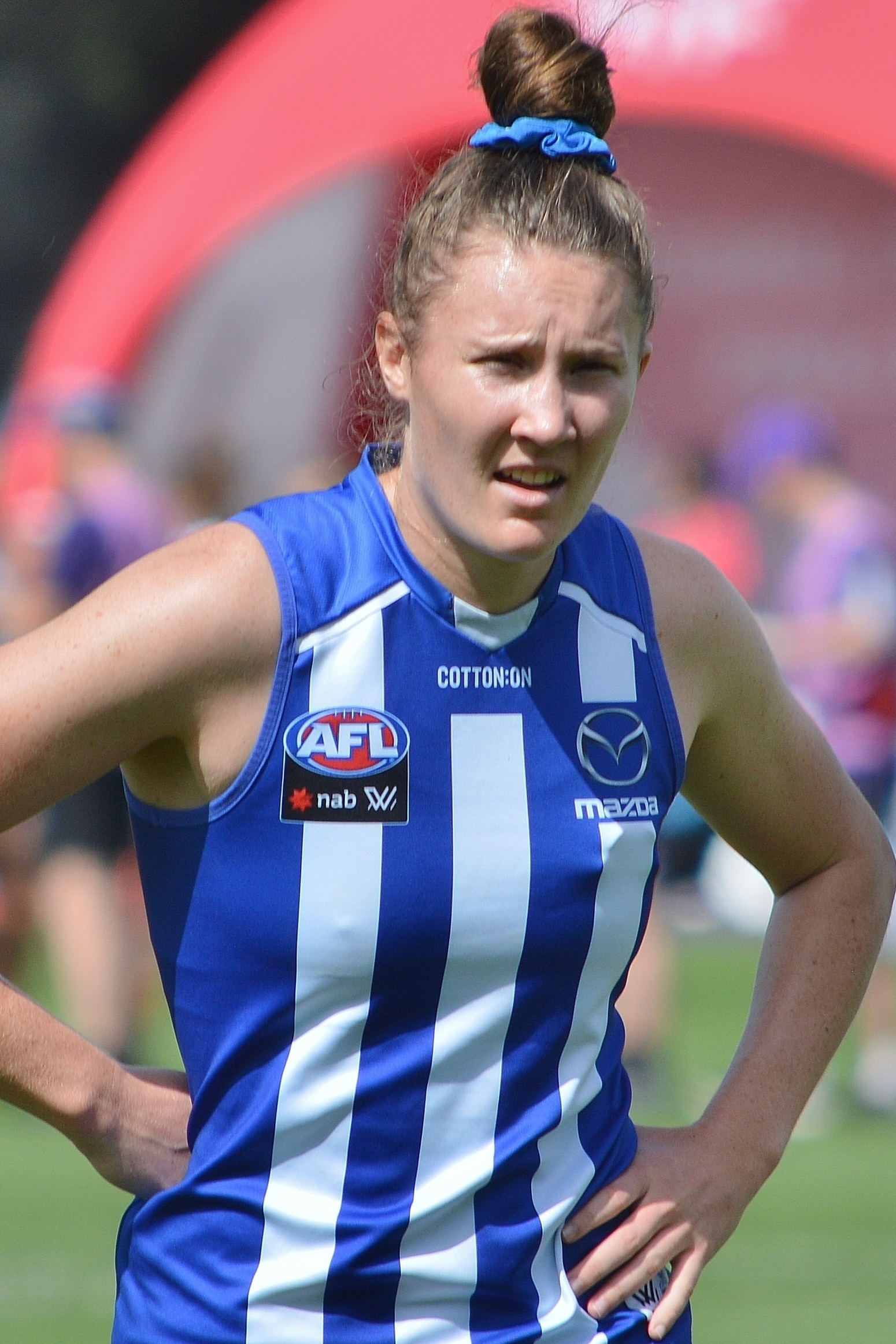
- Randall playing for North Melbourne in 2021

Personal information
- Full name: Tahlia Randall
- Born: 29 May 1998 (age 28); Buderim, Queensland
- Original team: Wilston Grange (QWAFL)
- Draft: No. 15, 2016 national draft
- Debut: Round 1, 2017, Brisbane vs. Melbourne, at Casey Fields
- Height: 175 cm (5 ft 9 in)
- Position: Key defender / key forward

Club information
- Current club: North Melbourne
- Number: 16

Playing career^{1}
Years	Club	Games (Goals)
2017–2018	Brisbane	15 (0)
2019–	North Melbourne	90 (82)
Total		105 (82)

Representative team honours^{2}
Years	Team	Games (Goals)
2026	Australia	1 (4)
- ^{1} Playing statistics correct to the end of the 2025 season.^{2} Representative statistics correct as of 2026.

Career highlights
- 2x AFLW premiership player: 2024, 2025; North Melbourne equal games record holder; North Melbourne leading goalkicker: 2022 (S7); AFLW Mark of the Year: 2022 (S6); AFL Women's Rising Star nominee: 2018

Tahlia Randall (born 29 May 1998) is an Australian rules footballer playing for the North Melbourne Football Club in the AFL Women's (AFLW). Randall previously played for the Brisbane Lions in 2017 and 2018, where she received a nomination for the 2018 AFL Women's Rising Star award in round 6 of the 2018 season. She won the AFLW Mark of the Year in the 2022 season 6, and is also North Melbourne's equal games record holder with 48 games for the club.

== Early life ==
Randall was born in Buderim, Queensland and is of New Zealand descent through her mother, Jenny. She attended Kuluin State School and Mountain Creek State High School. She grew up supporting the Brisbane Lions, and her favourite player was Simon Black. Randall played junior football for the Kawana and Nambour/Maroochydore youth girls teams, and played school football for Mountain Creek, until graduating. She then played for the Wilston Grange Football Club in the Queensland Women's Australian Football League (QWAFL) in 2016 before being drafted.

== AFL Women's career ==
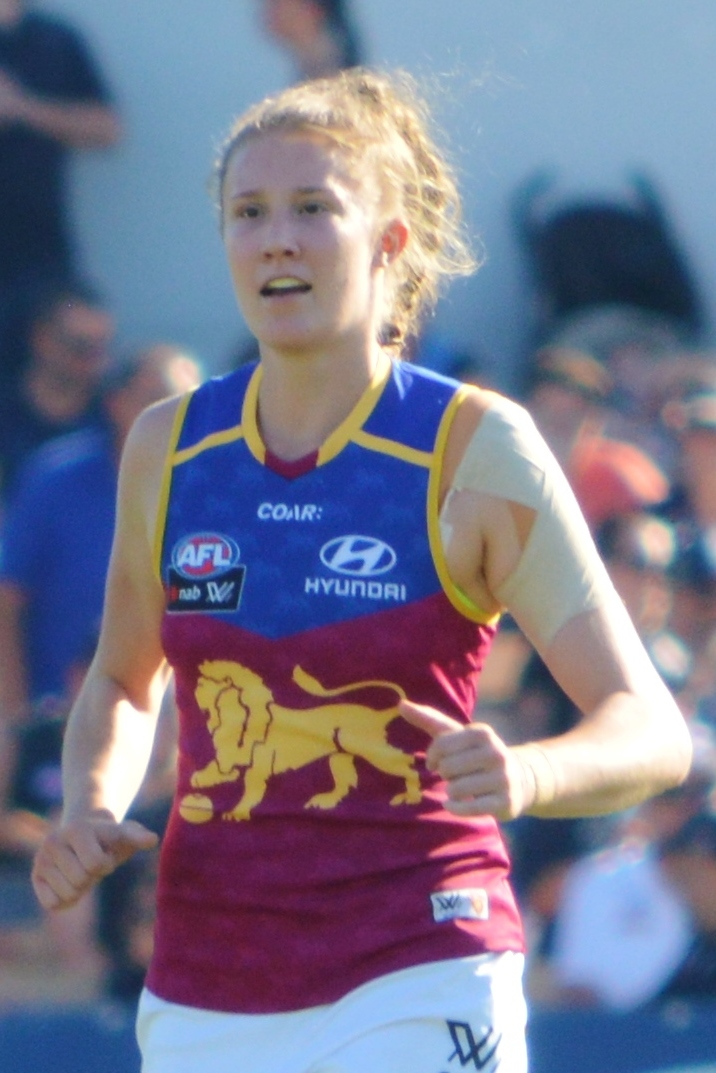
Randall playing for Brisbane in 2017

=== Brisbane (2017–2018) ===
Randall was drafted by Brisbane with its second selection and fifteenth overall in the 2016 AFL Women's draft. Randall made her AFL Women's debut in the Lions' inaugural match against Melbourne at Casey Fields in round 1 of the 2017 season. She went on to play seven games in her debut season, playing predominantly as a key defender, missing only the round 4 win over Greater Western Sydney due to a shoulder injury. Randall played in the six-point 2017 AFL Women's Grand Final loss to Adelaide. Brisbane signed Randall for the 2018 season during the trading and signing period in May 2017.

After making a permanent move to the ruck in her second season, Randall had an impressive start to the 2018 season, achieving selection in the team of the week in rounds 2 and 4. She later received a nomination for the 2018 AFL Women's Rising Star award after recording seven disposals, three marks and nine hit-outs in Brisbane's round 6 loss to Collingwood in heavy rain. Randall went on to play in the 2018 AFL Women's Grand Final loss to the Western Bulldogs, Brisbane's second consecutive grand final loss. She finished the season with the third-most hit-outs in the competition (140), after leading the statistic earlier in the season.

=== North Melbourne (2019–present) ===
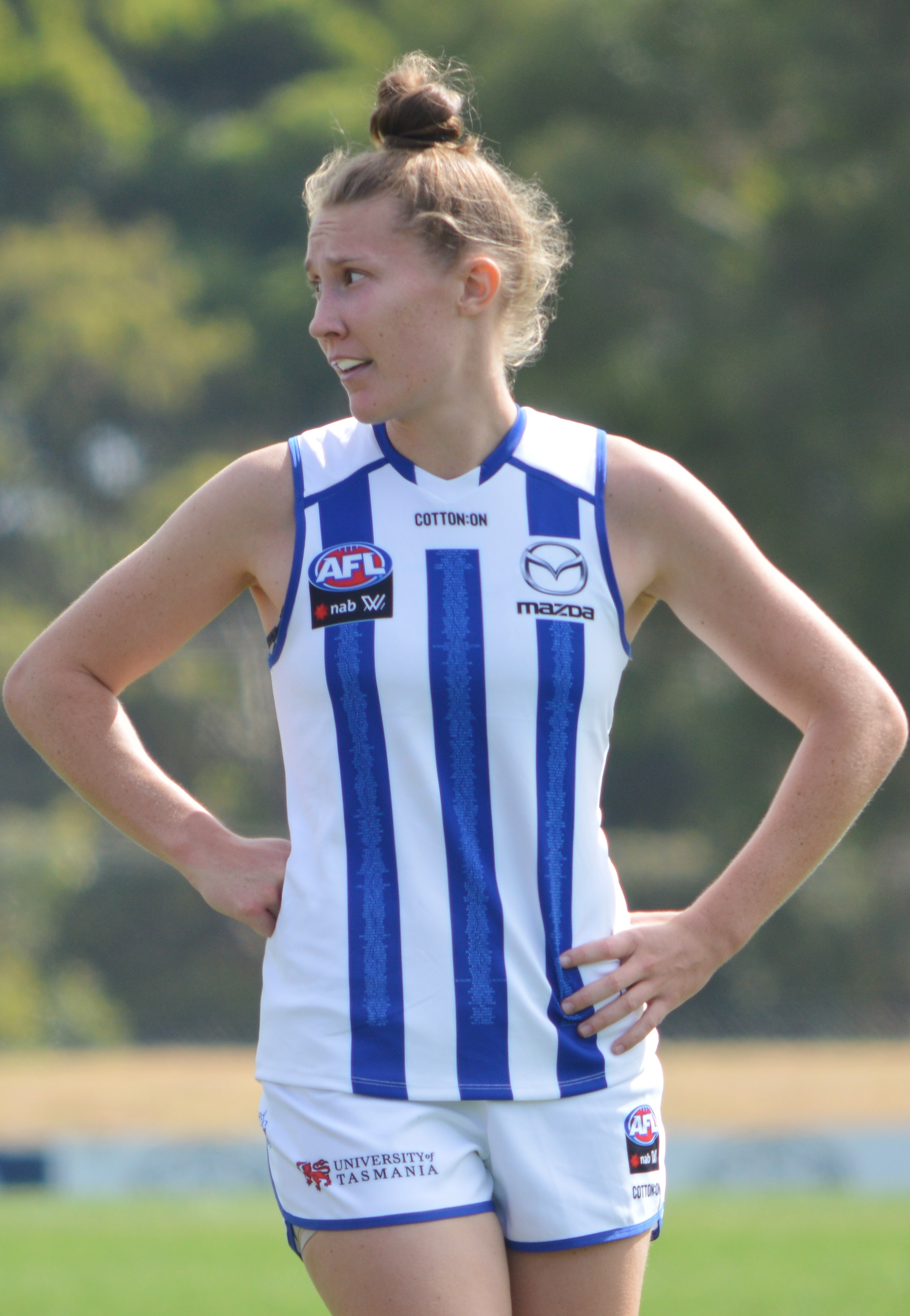
Randall during a pre-season practice match for North Melbourne in 2019

On 11 May 2018, after appearing at her junior club Kawana only days earlier as part of her AFL Women's Rising Star nomination, Randall was signed by North Melbourne at the beginning of the trading and signing period ahead of the club's inaugural season in the AFL Women's, along with teammate Jamie Stanton, and teammates Kaitlyn Ashmore and Brittany Gibson later joined them. She remained in the number 16 guernsey that she previously wore for Brisbane. Randall later played for Gold Coast in the inaugural AFL Women's Winter Series in June and July.

Randall returned to her familiar position as a defender at her second club, and made her North Melbourne debut in the club's inaugural match against Carlton at North Hobart Oval in round 1 of the 2019 season. Randall was twice cited by Match Review Officer Michael Christian during the season. She was offered a reprimand for an incident in round 2 and a $400 fine for an incident in round 5. Randall signed a two-year contract with North Melbourne during the trade and sign period in April 2019.

Randall had a good start to the 2021 season, achieving selection in womens.afl's Team of the Week in round 1 after accumulating nine spoils. She kicked her first career goal the following week against St Kilda, and was again named in the Team of the Week. It was revealed she signed on with the club for two more seasons on 17 June 2021, tying her to the club until the end of 2023. Randall achieved selection in Champion Data's 2021 AFLW All-Star stats team, after leading the league for average spoils in the 2021 AFL Women's season, totalling 3.7 a game.

Randall's pack mark in the third quarter of North Melbourne's win over Greater Western Sydney in round 3 of 2022 season 6 was voted by fans as mark of the round.

== Statistics ==
Updated to the end of the 2024.

Legend
G	Goals	K	Kicks	D	Disposals	T	Tackles
B	Behinds	H	Handballs	M	Marks

Season	Team	No.	Games	Totals							Averages (per game)							Votes
Season	Team	No.	Games	G	B	K	H	D	M	T	G	B	K	H	D	M	T	Votes
2017	Brisbane	16	7	0	0	32	11	43	14	12	0.0	0.0	4.6	1.6	6.1	2.0	1.7	0
2018	Brisbane	16	8	0	0	37	16	53	9	24	0.0	0.0	4.6	2.0	6.6	1.1	3.0	0
2019	North Melbourne	16	7	0	0	39	10	49	17	18	0.0	0.0	5.6	1.4	7.0	2.4	2.6	0
2020	North Melbourne	16	7	0	0	45	10	55	18	14	0.0	0.0	6.4	1.4	7.9	2.6	2.0	0
2021	North Melbourne	16	10	1	0	64	19	83	26	16	0.1	0.0	6.4	1.9	8.3	2.6	1.6	1
2022 (S6)	North Melbourne	16	11	9	9	46	16	62	20	29	0.8	0.8	4.2	1.5	5.7	1.8	2.6	0
2022 (S7)	North Melbourne	16	13	12	13	68	20	88	37	17	0.9	1.0	5.2	1.5	6.8	2.8	1.3	
2023	North Melbourne	16	13	21	16	75	29	104	31	24	1.6	1.2	5.8	2.2	8.0	2.4	1.8	
2024^{#}	North Melbourne	16	14	15	12	71	38	109	21	43	1.1	0.9	5.1	2.7	7.8	1.5	3.1	
Career			90	58	50	477	169	646	197	220	0.6	0.6	5.3	1.9	7.2	2.1	2.2	1

== Honours and achievements ==
Team

- AFL Women's minor premiership (Brisbane): 2017

Individual

- North Melbourne equal games record holder
- AFLW Mark of the Year: 2022 (S6)
- AFL Women's Rising Star nominee: 2018
