= Emily McGuire =

Australian rules footballer

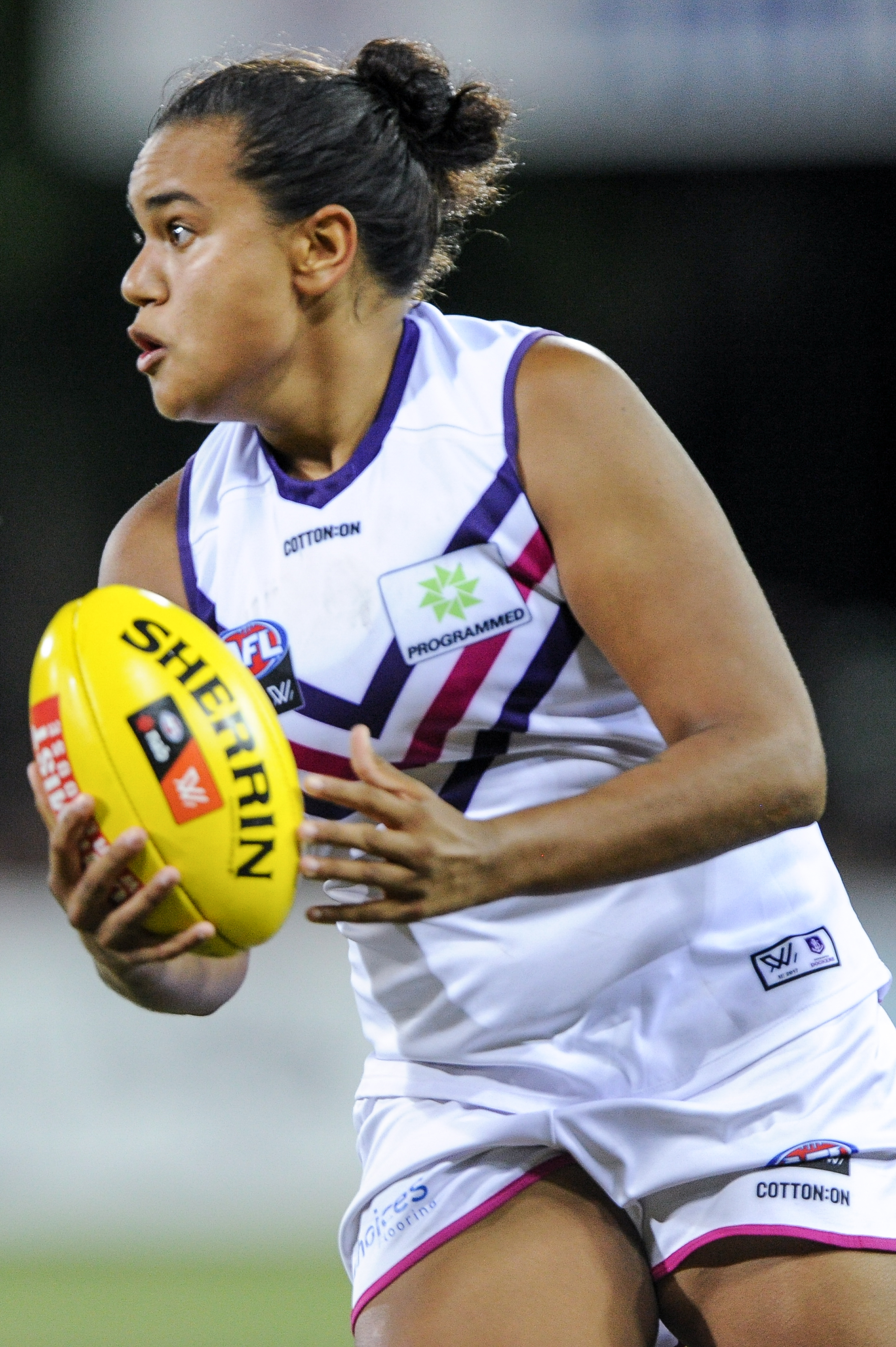
- McGuire playing for Fremantle in January 2018

Personal information
- Born: 12 January 1999 (age 27)
- Original team: Swan Districts (WAWFL)
- Draft: No. 33, 2017 AFL Women's draft
- Debut: Round 3, 2018, Fremantle vs. Melbourne, at Fremantle Oval
- Height: 174 cm (5 ft 9 in)
- Position: Forward

Playing career^{1}
Years	Club	Games (Goals)
2018	Fremantle	3 (2)
2020	West Coast	3 (0)
Total		6 (2)
- ^{1} Playing statistics correct to the end of the 2020 season.

Career highlights
- AFL Women's Rising Star nominee: 2018

Emily McGuire (born 12 January 1999) is an Australian rules footballer who played for the Fremantle Football Club in the AFL Women's (AFLW). McGuire was drafted by Fremantle with their fifth selection and thirty-third overall in the 2017 AFL Women's draft. She made her debut in the five-point win against Melbourne at Fremantle Oval in round three of the 2018 season. McGuire received a nomination for the 2018 AFL Women's Rising Star award after kicking two goals in the match. She was delisted by Fremantle at the end of the 2018 season. In August 2020, McGuire was delisted by West Coast.
