= Breann Harrington =

Australian rules footballer

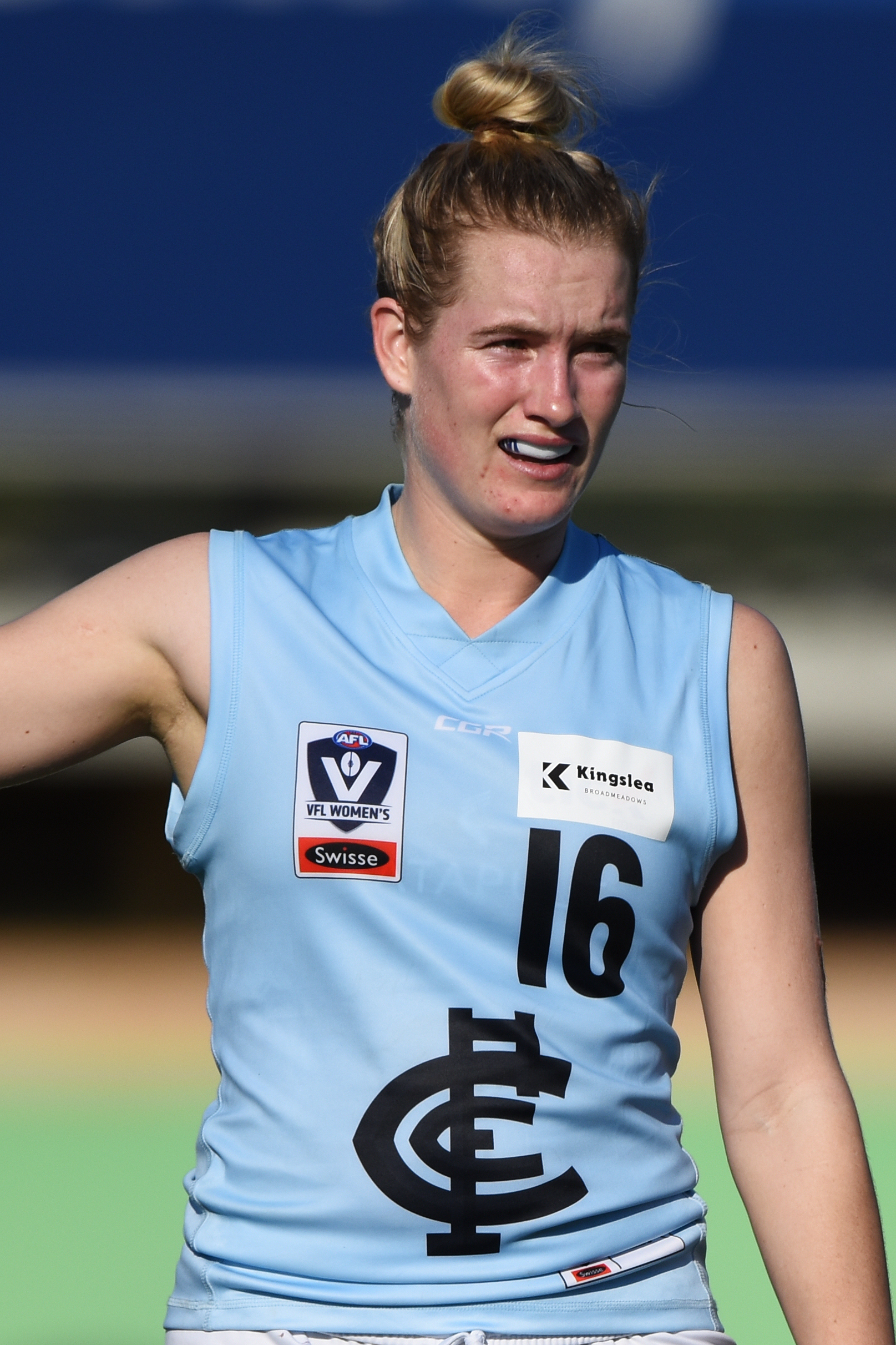
- Harrington playing for Carlton's VFLW team in 2019

Personal information
- Full name: Breann Harrington
- Born: 4 March 1997 (age 29)
- Original team: Cranbourne (VFL Women's)
- Draft: No. 67, 2016 AFL Women's draft
- Debut: Round 1, 2017, Carlton vs. Collingwood, at Ikon Park
- Height: 180 cm (5 ft 11 in)
- Position: Ruck

Club information
- Current club: Carlton
- Number: 16

Playing career^{1}
Years	Club	Games (Goals)
2017–	Carlton	89 (28)
- ^{1} Playing statistics correct to the end of round 11, 2025.

Career highlights
- 2× Carlton best and fairest: 2018, 2023; AFL Women's Rising Star nomination: 2018; 2× AFL Women's All-Australian team: 2021, S7 (2022)

Breann Harrington (née Moody; born 4 March 1997) is an Australian rules footballer playing for the Carlton Football Club in the AFL Women's competition (AFLW). She was drafted by Carlton with the club's ninth selection and the sixty seventh overall in the 2016 AFL Women's draft. She made her debut in Round 1, 2017, in the club and the league's inaugural match at Ikon Park against Collingwood. Harrington finished 2017 having played in all seven of Carlton's matches that season. In 2018, Harrington received a nomination for the 2018 AFL Women's Rising Star award after recording 29 hitouts and eleven disposals in Carlton's round 5 loss to Adelaide. At the end of the 2018 season, she was the joint winner of the club best and fairest alongside Katie Loynes.

She received an All-Australian blazer for the first time in 2021 after being named as the ruck in the 2021 AFL Women's All-Australian team.

== Personal life ==
Harrington is the daughter of race horse trainer Peter Moody, known for training Black Caviar. She has a twin sister, Celine Moody, who also played in the AFLW.

Harrington is currently studying a Bachelor of Exercise and Sport Science/Bachelor of Business (Sport Management) at Deakin University.

== Statistics ==
Statistics are correct to the end of round 11, 2025.

Legend
G	Goals	K	Kicks	D	Disposals	T	Tackles
B	Behinds	H	Handballs	M	Marks	H/O	Hit-outs

Season	Team	No.	Games	Totals								Averages (per game)								Votes
Season	Team	No.	Games	G	B	K	H	D	M	T	H/O	G	B	K	H	D	M	T	H/O	Votes
2017	Carlton	16	7	1	0	24	10	34	1	6	83	0.1	0.0	3.4	1.4	4.9	0.1	0.9	11.9	0
2018	Carlton	16	7	0	0	33	20	53	7	11	147	0.0	0.0	4.7	2.9	7.6	1.0	1.6	21.0	2
2019	Carlton	16	8	2	3	22	13	35	10	8	69	0.3	0.4	2.8	1.6	4.4	1.3	1.0	8.6	0
2020	Carlton	16	7	0	1	31	20	51	1	101	117	0.0	0.1	4.4	2.9	7.3	1.4	1.6	16.7	0
2021	Carlton	16	9	1	1	66	40	106	28	14	170	0.1	0.1	7.3	4.4	11.8	3.1	1.6	18.9	3
2022 (S6)	Carlton	16	9	2	1	76	31	107	27	22	177	0.2	0.1	8.4	3.4	11.9	3.0	2.4	19.7	9
2022 (S7)	Carlton	16	10	6	2	85	27	112	28	30	228	0.6	0.2	8.5	2.7	11.2	2.8	3.9	22.8	10
2023	Carlton	16	10	6	1	80	45	125	35	40	202	0.6	0.1	8.0	4.5	12.5	3.5	4.0	20.2	10
2024	Carlton	16	11	5	2	66	30	96	17	38	136	0.5	0.2	6.0	2.7	8.7	1.5	3.5	12.4	3
2025	Carlton	16	11	5	2	103	20	123	44	30	121	0.5	0.2	9.4	1.8	11.2	4.0	2.7	11.0	TBC
Career			89	28	13	586	256	842	207	210	1450	0.3	0.1	6.6	2.9	9.5	2.3	2.4	16.3	37
