= 2018 AFL Women's Grand Final =

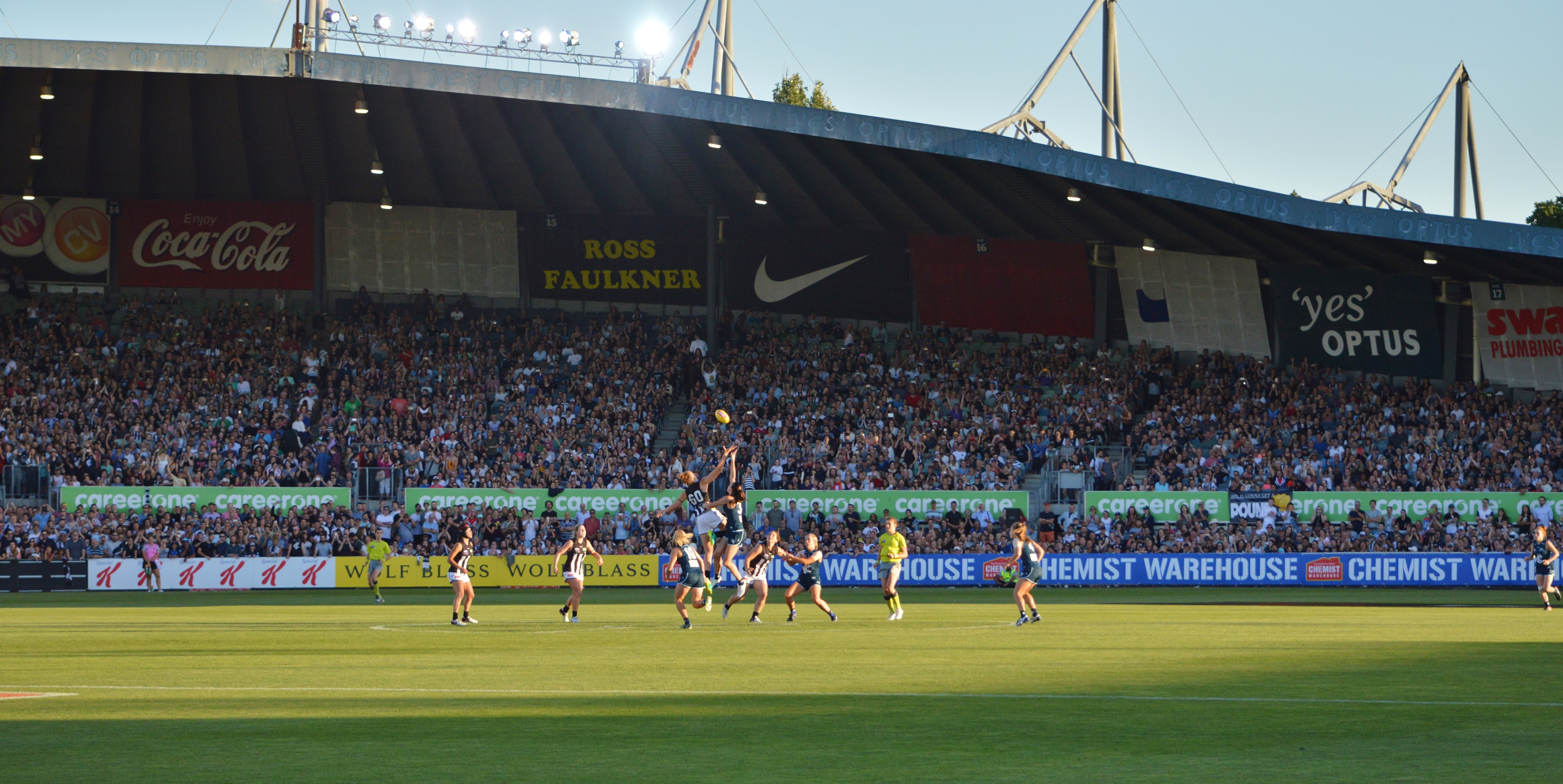
- Ikon Park, venue for the 2018 AFL Women's Grand Final, as seen during an AFLW match in 2017.

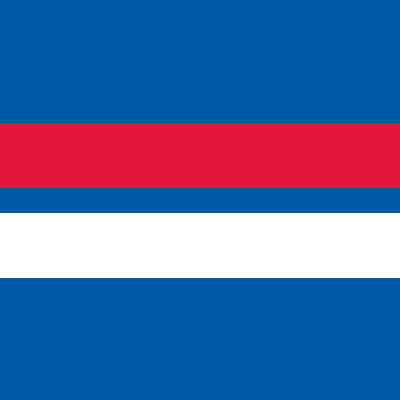

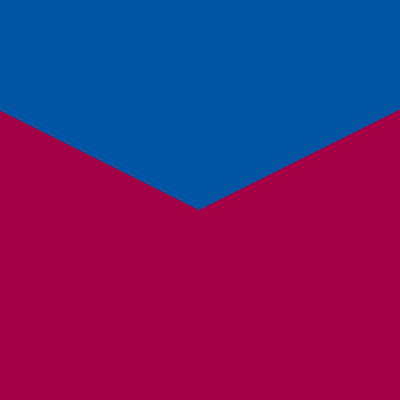
Western Bulldogs	Brisbane
4.3 (27)	3.3 (21)
	1	2	3	4
WB	0.1 (1)	0.1 (1)	3.2 (20)	4.3 (27)
BL	1.1 (7)	1.1 (7)	1.1 (7)	3.3 (21)
- Date: 24 March 2018
- Stadium: Ikon Park
- Attendance: 7,083

Broadcast in Australia
- Network: Seven Network
- Commentators: Jason Bennett, Nigel Carmody, Daisy Pearce, Peta Searle, Sam Lane

The 2018 AFL Women's Grand Final was an Australian rules football match held on 24 March 2018 to determine the premiers of the 2018 AFL Women's season, the league's second season. It was contested by the Western Bulldogs and Brisbane and was won by the Western Bulldogs. The Bulldogs claimed their first AFL Women's premiership, whilst Brisbane suffered their second consecutive loss by six points in a Grand Final.

== Background ==
The Australian Football League (AFL) continued with the top-two qualification system, whereby the two highest ranked clubs would qualify for the grand final, rather than having a finals series. The date of the match clashed with the opening round of the 2018 AFL season, however the start time of 12:35 pm Australian Eastern Daylight Saving Time allowed the match to conclude before the first AFL premiership match to be held later that day, which featured the Brisbane men's team.

=== Qualification ===
Pos	Team	Pld	W	L	D	PF	PA	PP	Pts	Qualification
1	Western Bulldogs (P)	7	5	2	0	312	219	142.5	20	Grand Final
2	Brisbane	7	4	3	0	248	196	126.5	16	Grand Final
3	Melbourne	7	4	3	0	278	240	115.8	16	
4	Greater Western Sydney	7	3	3	1	224	242	92.6	14	
5	Adelaide	7	3	3	1	230	249	92.4	14	
6	Collingwood	7	3	4	0	281	254	110.6	12	
7	Fremantle	7	3	4	0	230	256	89.8	12	
8	Carlton	7	2	5	0	173	320	54.1	8	

Source: AFL.com.au
Rules for classification: 1) points; 2) percentage; 3) number of points for.
(P) Premiers

Entering the final round of the regular season, five clubs were a mathematical chance of qualifying for the grand final, with the Bulldogs tied with Melbourne on points but ahead on percentage in the top two positions. The Brisbane Lions were considered the least likely to qualify, as they were in fifth place and needed to defeat Greater Western Sydney away from home and then rely on results in other matches.

Brisbane's surprise 40-point win against Greater Western Sydney saw them leapfrog Adelaide, Greater Western Sydney and Melbourne into second place. The Bulldogs narrowly defeated Melbourne the following night, thereby clinching qualification and keeping Brisbane's season alive. Adelaide were considered strong favourites in the final match of the regular season against Collingwood, but Collingwood ran away with a surprise victory to ensure that Brisbane retained second position and qualified for their second consecutive grand final. Adelaide's match was watched on television by the Brisbane players, who celebrated wildly after it concluded. Despite the loss, Adelaide coach Bec Goddard congratulated the Western Bulldogs and Brisbane Lions for clinching the two spots in the grand final, saying "the two sides...are in there and I'm sure they will have a cracking contest next week."

=== Venue ===
It was announced by the AFL that the 2018 AFL Women's Grand Final would be played at Ikon Park. The decision was made on the basis that Ikon Park could manage a greater capacity than the Western Bulldogs' home ground the Whitten Oval. It was the first time an AFL Women's Grand Final was played in Melbourne.

== Match summary ==
The game was played in wet and blustery conditions, with heavy rain falling in the hours leading up to the game. This kept the crowd numbers down, with most huddled under the sheltered areas, and caused the scheduled pre-match entertainment by Missy Higgins to be cancelled. The first quarter opened with a Brisbane goal. Speedster Kate McCarthy brought the ball out of the centre and delivered it to forward Jess Wuetschner, who found Sophie Conway unmarked 20 metres out from goal with a precision pass. Conway then converted.

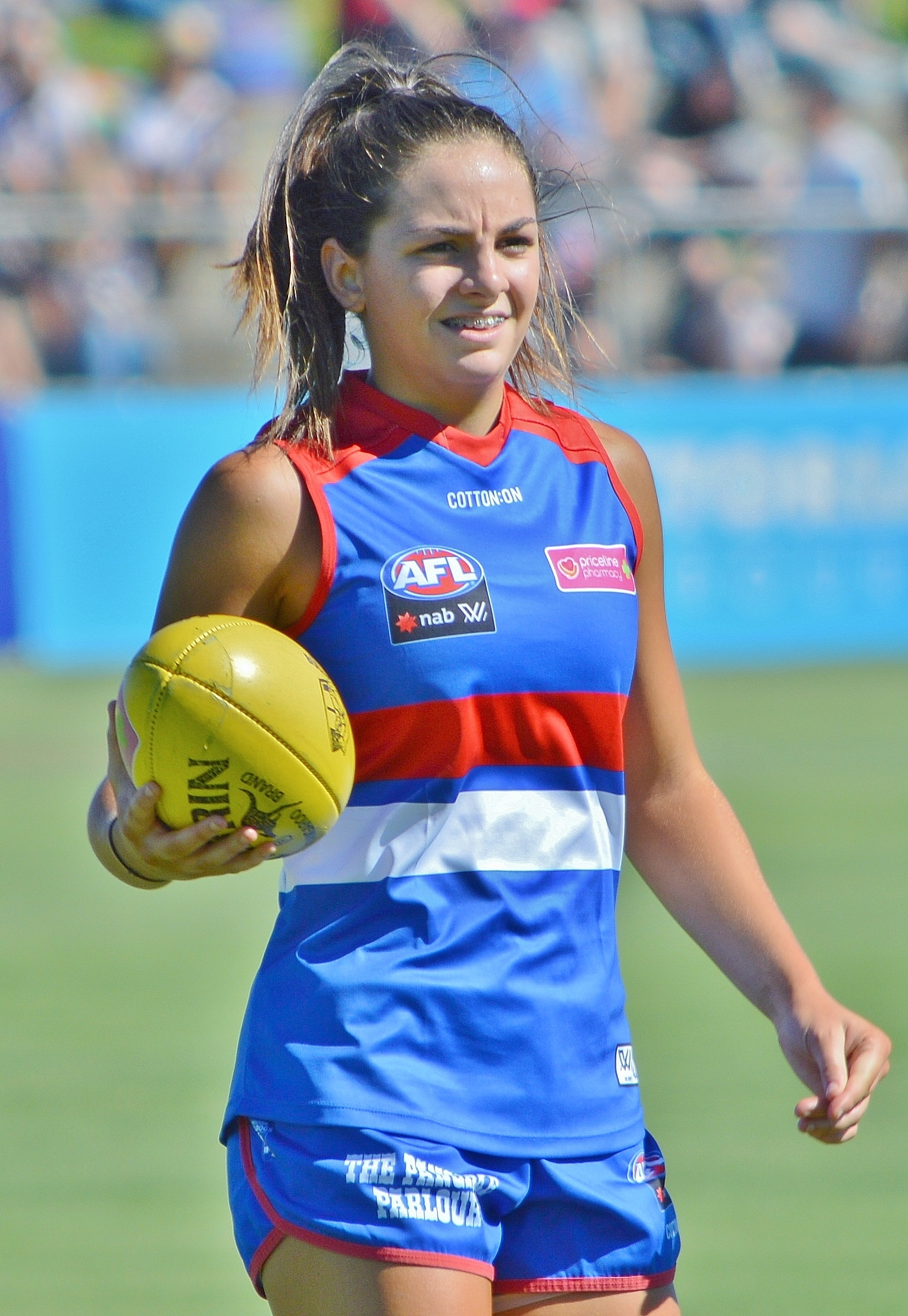
Monique Conti was voted best on ground

Conway had another opportunity a few minutes later, but chose to attempt a snap shot herself rather than send the ball to Wuetschner, who was alone in the goal square, and missed everything. Conway's goal was the only one kicked by either side in the first half. The Western Bulldogs seemed unable to get past key Brisbane defender Kate Lutkins. Kaitlyn Ashmore also had an opportunity from 15 metres out just before the half time siren, but also missed everything.

After the half time break, the rain abated, and Bulldogs midfielders Ellie Blackburn and Emma Kearney began to wrest control of the centre of the oval. The game remained tough and physical, with Kearney, who was well-contained by Brisbane tagger Nat Exon for most of the day, turning aside assistance offered by one of the trainers, and there were injury concerns for Kirsty Lamb. Deanna Berry somehow evaded two defenders and managed to kick the Bulldogs' first goal with a long shot from outside the 50-metre arc.

This was followed in quick succession by another, dribbled in by Kirsten McLeod, who had been brought in to replace the suspended Katie Brennan, but had not touched the ball in the first half. Monique Conti, an 18-year-old who also played in the basketball grand final with the Melbourne Boomers, and wound up being voted best on ground, concluded the third term with a goal from a ball delivered to her by McLeod, giving the Bulldogs a 14-point lead.

The Brisbane Lions fought back in the final quarter. Wuetschner dribbled in a goal to peg the Bulldogs' lead back to eight points. Kearney responded with a fourth Bulldogs goal, but Wuetschner kicked her second in reply. In the dying minutes of the game, the Brisbane Lions surged forward, seeking a fourth major that would tie the game and send it into extra time. The ball was marked in the dying seconds of the game by Bulldogs' defender Naomi Ferres, who grasped it as the final siren sounded.

When it came time to raise the winner's cup at the end of medal presentations, acting captain Ellie Blackburn declared: "I can't hold that cup up alone – KB, get up here!" The two raised the cup together, Brennan lifting her shirt to reveal the Bulldogs' guernsey beneath. The gesture invoked memories of the 2016 AFL Grand Final, when injured Bulldogs skipper Bob Murphy was similarly called up on stage to raise the cup.

== Teams ==
The teams were announced on 22 March. Western Bulldogs captain Katie Brennan was a prominent exclusion from the team, after she was suspended by the Tribunal for a sling tackle executed in the final match of the home-and-away season against Melbourne. The tribunal's decision to reject Brennan's appeal was met with surprise by some, who thought the punishment was not in line with expectations in the men's game. Brennan subsequently lodged a proceeding with the Australian Human Rights Commission in an attempt to have the AFL amend the differences between the AFLW regulations and the AFL regulations. Brisbane named an unchanged line-up.

Western Bulldogs
B:	18 Libby Birch	11 Lauren Spark	16 Naomi Ferres
HB:	22 Hannah Scott	19 Tiarna Ernst	10 Nicole Callinan
C:		2 Ellie Blackburn(c)	
HF:	35 Jenna Bruton	28 Bonnie Toogood	8 Monique Conti
F:	23 Aisling Utri	6 Kirsten McLeod	1 Brooke Lochland
Foll:	4 Aasta O'Connor	5 Emma Kearney	27 Kirsty Lamb
Int:	36 Angelica Gogos	21 Bailey Hunt	17 Hayley Wildes
Int:	24 Kim Rennie	7 Deanna Berry	
Coach:	Paul Groves		

Brisbane Lions
B:	29 Emma Pittman	11 Leah Kaslar	3 Breanna Koenen
HB:	8 Emma Zielke(c)	13 Kate Lutkins	9 Kate McCarthy
C:		15 Nat Exon	
HF:	1 Emily Bates	16 Tahlia Randall	6 Megan Hunt
F:	23 Jess Wuetschner	25 Brittany Gibson	10 Kaitlyn Ashmore
Foll:	14 Sabrina Frederick-Traub	17 Jamie Stanton	18 Ally Anderson
Int:	4 Sharni Webb	2 Bella Ayre	20 Shannon Campbell
Int:	12 Sophie Conway	21 Arianna Clarke	
Coach:	Craig Starcevich		

== Scorecard ==
2018 AFL Women's Grand Final
Saturday, 24 March (12:35pm)	Western Bulldogs	def.	Brisbane	Ikon Park (crowd: 7,083)	Report
0.1 (1); 0.1 (1); 3.2 (20); 4.3 (27)	Q1; Q2; Q3; Final	1.1 (7); 1.1 (7); 1.1 (7); 3.3 (21)	Umpires: Mirable, Howorth, Adair; Best on ground: Monique Conti; Television broadcast: Seven Network; National anthem: Isabella Clarke
Berry, McLeod, Conti, Kearney	Goals	Wuetschner 2, Conway
Conti, Blackburn, Kearney, Birch, Spark, Bruton	Best	Lutkins, Stanton, Wuetschner, Zielke, Ashmore
Nil	Injuries	Campbell (head/neck)

== Media coverage ==
The 2018 AFL Women's Grand Final was broadcast on the Seven Network, as part of a broadcasting rights deal that saw Seven West Media gain broadcasting rights to all matches of the 2018 AFL Women's season, airing on the Seven Network, 7mate, or the video on demand service, PLUS7. Outside of Australia, it was made available live and for replay on the Watch AFL subscription web site and app.
