= Eloise Jones (footballer) =

Australian rules footballer

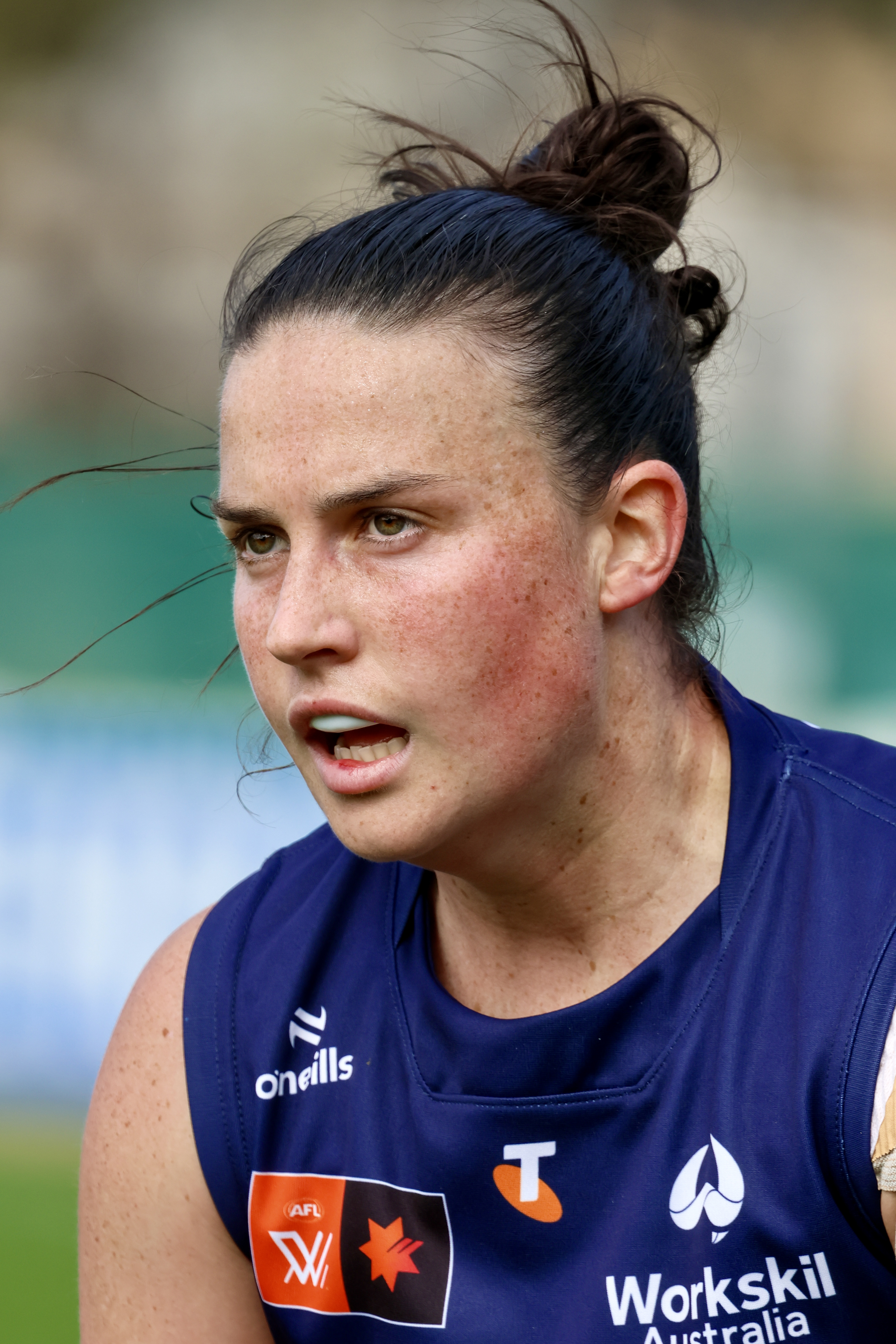
- Jones with Adelaide in 2026

Personal information
- Nickname: EJ
- Born: 28 April 1999 (age 27)
- Original team: Morphettville Park (SAWFL)
- Draft: No. 24, 2017 AFL Women's draft
- Debut: Round 1, 2018, Adelaide vs. Brisbane, at Norwood Oval
- Height: 169 cm (5 ft 7 in)
- Position: Midfielder/Forward

Club information
- Current club: Adelaide
- Number: 2

Playing career^{1}
Years	Club	Games (Goals)
2018–	Adelaide	66 (41)
- ^{1} Playing statistics correct to the end of the 2023 season.

Career highlights
- 2× AFL Women's premiership player: 2019, 2022 (S6); AFL Women's Rising Star nominee: 2018; 22 Under 22 team: 2022 (S6)

Eloise Jones (born 28 April 1999) is an Australian rules footballer playing for the Adelaide Football Club in the AFL Women's (AFLW). Jones is a two-time AFL Women's premiership player for the Adelaide Football Club, as a member of their 2019 and 2022 (S6) premiership teams.

== Early life and state football ==
In addition to football, Jones also played basketball before her AFLW career, while playing her junior football at Morphettville Park. At the 2017 AFL Women's Under 18 Championships she captained the Allies and was named as part of the championships' All-Australian team.

Before being drafted, Jones was part of Adelaide's Girls High Performance Squad. She turned down a college basketball scholarship in the United States in order to focus on football, and she played for Glenelg in the inaugural season of the SANFL Women's League (SANFLW), kicking six goals for them in five games.

Jones joined NT Thunder for the VFL Women's (VFLW) season during the off-season of the AFLW following the 2018 season. She played seven games for them in 2018. She then lined-up for NT Thunder once more in their 2019 season.

== AFL Women's career ==
Jones was drafted by Adelaide with their third selection and twenty-fourth overall in the 2017 AFL Women's draft. Joining Adelaide she linked up again with coach Bec Goddard who coached her at the AFL Women's Under 18 Championships and with her idol Erin Phillips. Jones made her debut in the twelve point loss to Brisbane at Norwood Oval in the opening round of the 2018 season. Jones received a nomination for the 2018 AFL Women's Rising Star award after kicking two goals in Adelaide's round 5 win against Carlton. In March 2019, Jones was selected for the initial 40-player 2019 AFL Women's All-Australian team. However, she wasn't selected for the final squad. In March 2020, Jones was selected for the AFL Players Association's inaugural AFL Women's 22under22 squad.

== Coaching career ==
While playing senior Australian rules football, Jones also worked in coaching. She coached South Australia's under-15 girls state team, starting out as a forwards coach and being elevated to joint head coach. Furthermore, she took on a coaching role with Adelaide's Academy, assisting teammate and co-captain Chelsea Randall coach the girls elite talent.

== Personal life ==
Growing up, Jones and her family were Essendon supporters. In 2026, Jones announced her engagement to partner Erin. The couple were engaged on Kangaroo Island.
