= Bonnie Toogood =

Australian rules footballer

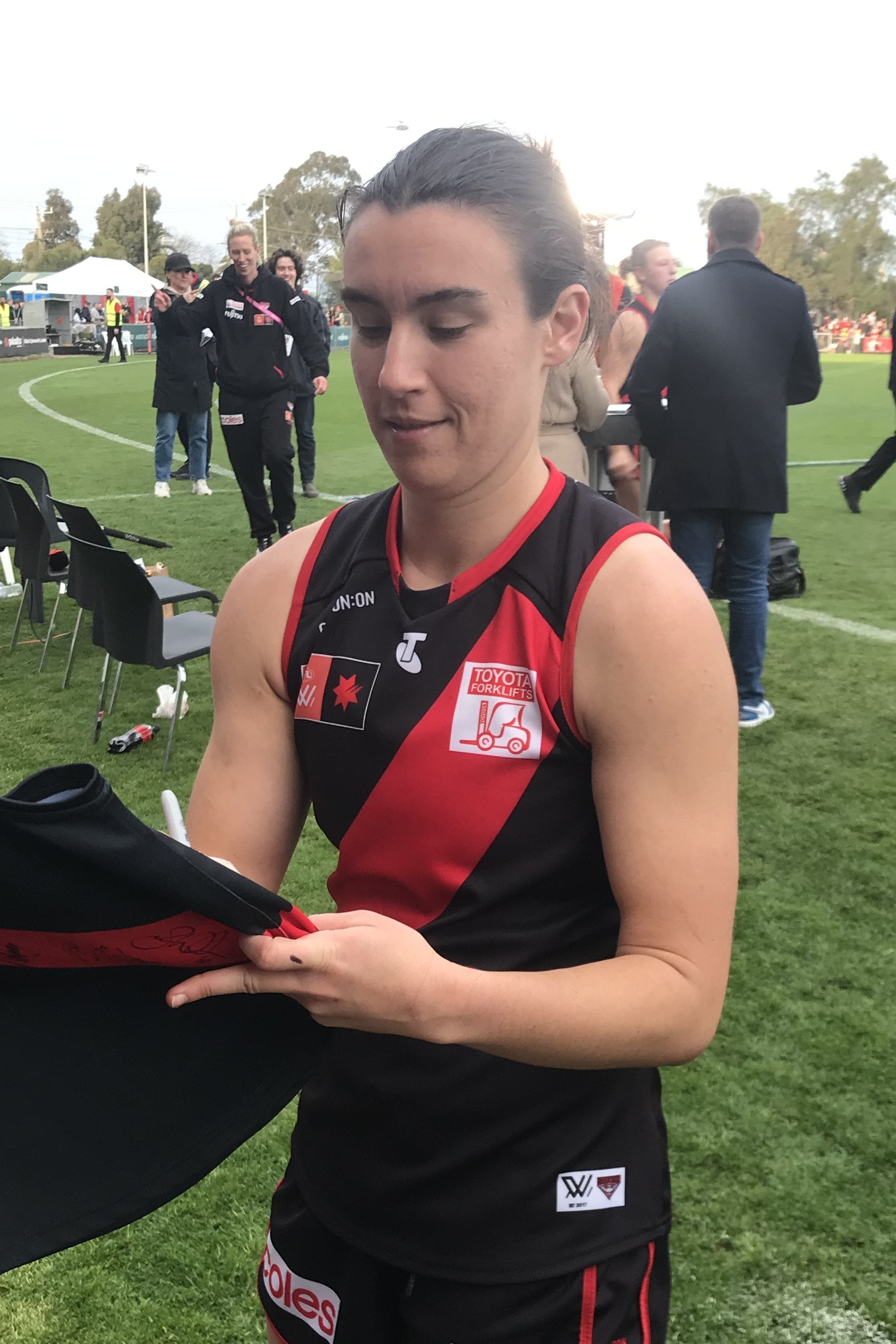
- Toogood post-match with Essendon in 2023

Personal information
- Full name: Bonnie Toogood
- Born: 8 December 1997 (age 28)
- Original team: Mornington (SEFNL)
- Draft: No. 11, 2017 rookie draft
- Debut: Round 1, 2018, Western Bulldogs vs. Fremantle, at VU Whitten Oval
- Height: 178 cm (5 ft 10 in)
- Position: Key forward

Club information
- Current club: Essendon
- Number: 8

Playing career^{1}
Years	Club	Games (Goals)
2018–2022 (S6)	Western Bulldogs	37 (29)
2022 (S7)–	Essendon	21 (23)
Total		58 (52)
- ^{1} Playing statistics correct to the end of the 2023 season.

Career highlights
- AFL Women's premiership player: 2018; Essendon co-captain: 2022 (S7)–; AFL Women's All-Australian team: 2023; Western Bulldogs leading goalkicker: S6; Essendon leading goalkicker: 2023; AFL Women's Rising Star nominee: 2018

Bonnie Toogood (born 8 December 1997) is an Australian rules footballer playing for the Essendon Football Club in the AFL Women's (AFLW).

== Early life ==
Toogood was educated at Melbourne Grammar and then Melbourne Girls Grammar.

== AFL Women's career ==
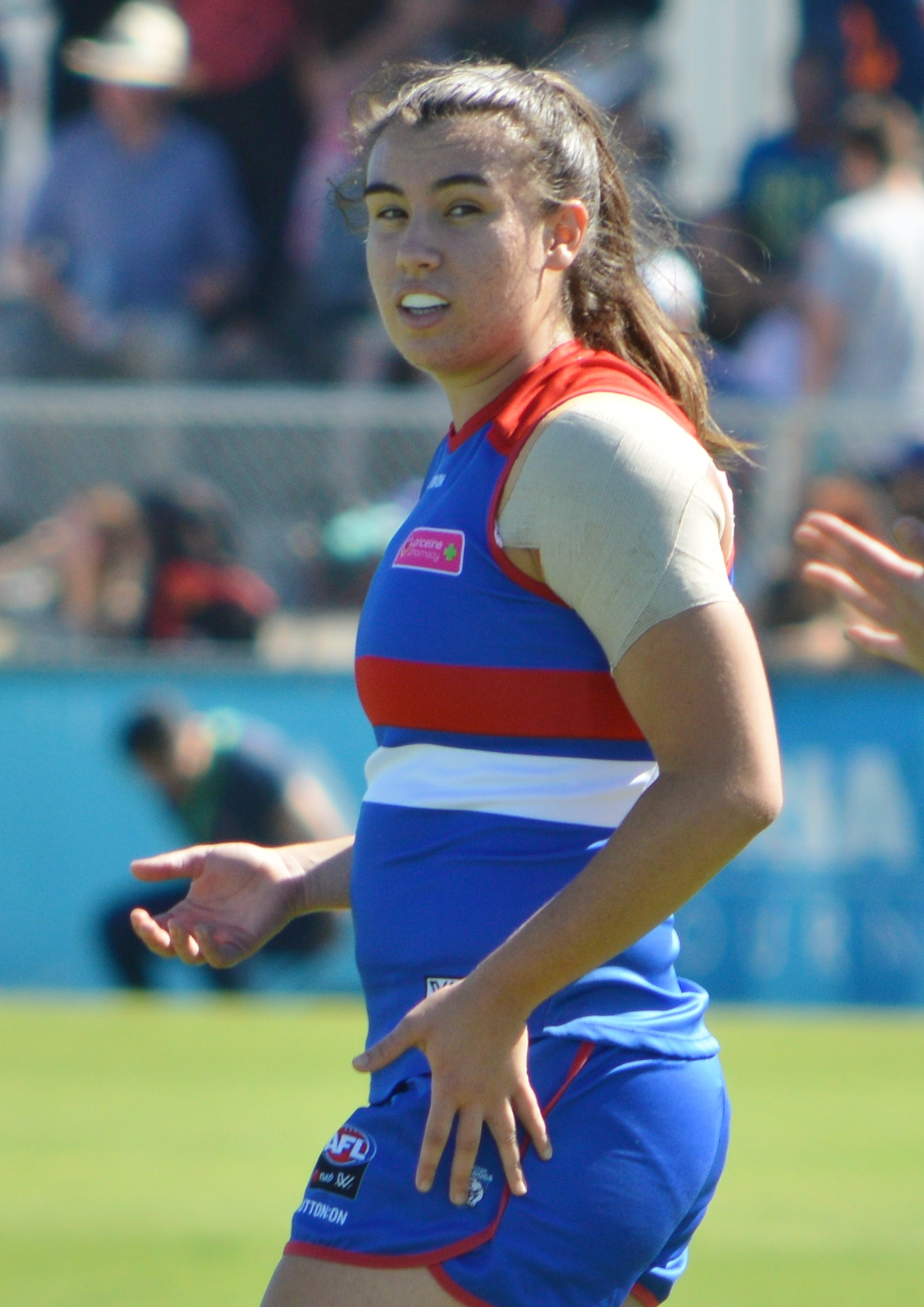
Toogood playing for the Western Bulldogs in 2018

=== Western Bulldogs (2018–2022 (S6)) ===
Toogood was drafted by the Western Bulldogs with their second selection and eleventh overall in the 2017 AFL Women's rookie draft. She made her debut in the twenty-six point win against Fremantle at VU Whitten Oval in the opening round of the 2018 season. Toogood was one of two round 2 nominees for the 2018 AFL Women's Rising Star award the following week after recording ten disposals and three tackles in her side's win over the Brisbane. She was named one of the Western Bulldogs' best players in the opening match of the 2021 AFL Women's season, kicking 2 goals and 1 behind, while also collecting 9 disposals and 3 marks. It was revealed that Toogood had signed a contract extension with the club on 16 June 2021, after playing every game possible for the club that season.

=== Essendon (2022 (S7)–present) ===
Toogood moved to Essendon at the conclusion of 2022 AFL Women's season 6, and was named the Bombers' co-captain in August 2022.

== Statistics ==
Statistics are correct to the end of the 2021 season.

Legend
G	Goals	K	Kicks	D	Disposals	T	Tackles
B	Behinds	H	Handballs	M	Marks

Season	Team	No.	Games	Totals							Averages (per game)							Votes
Season	Team	No.	Games	G	B	K	H	D	M	T	G	B	K	H	D	M	T	Votes
2018^{#}	Western Bulldogs	28	8	5	2	44	20	64	19	14	0.6	0.3	5.5	2.5	8.0	2.4	1.8	1
2019	Western Bulldogs	28	6	1	0	19	4	23	10	6	0.2	0.0	3.2	0.7	3.9	1.7	1.0	0
2020	Western Bulldogs	8	4	4	2	18	11	29	9	9	1.0	0.5	4.5	2.8	7.3	2.3	2.3	2
2021	Western Bulldogs	8	9	9	5	54	28	82	26	23	1.0	0.6	6.0	3.1	9.1	2.9	2.6	3
Career			27	19	9	135	63	198	64	52	0.7	0.3	5.0	2.3	7.3	2.4	1.9	6

== Honours and achievements ==
Team

- AFL Women's premiership player (Western Bulldogs): 2018
- AFL Women's minor premiership (Western Bulldogs): 2018

Individual

- Essendon co-captain: 2022 (S7)–present
- AFL Women's All-Australian team: 2023
- Western Bulldogs leading goalkicker: S6
- Essendon leading goalkicker: 2023
- AFL Women's Rising Star nominee: 2018
