= Naomi Ferres =

Australian rules footballer

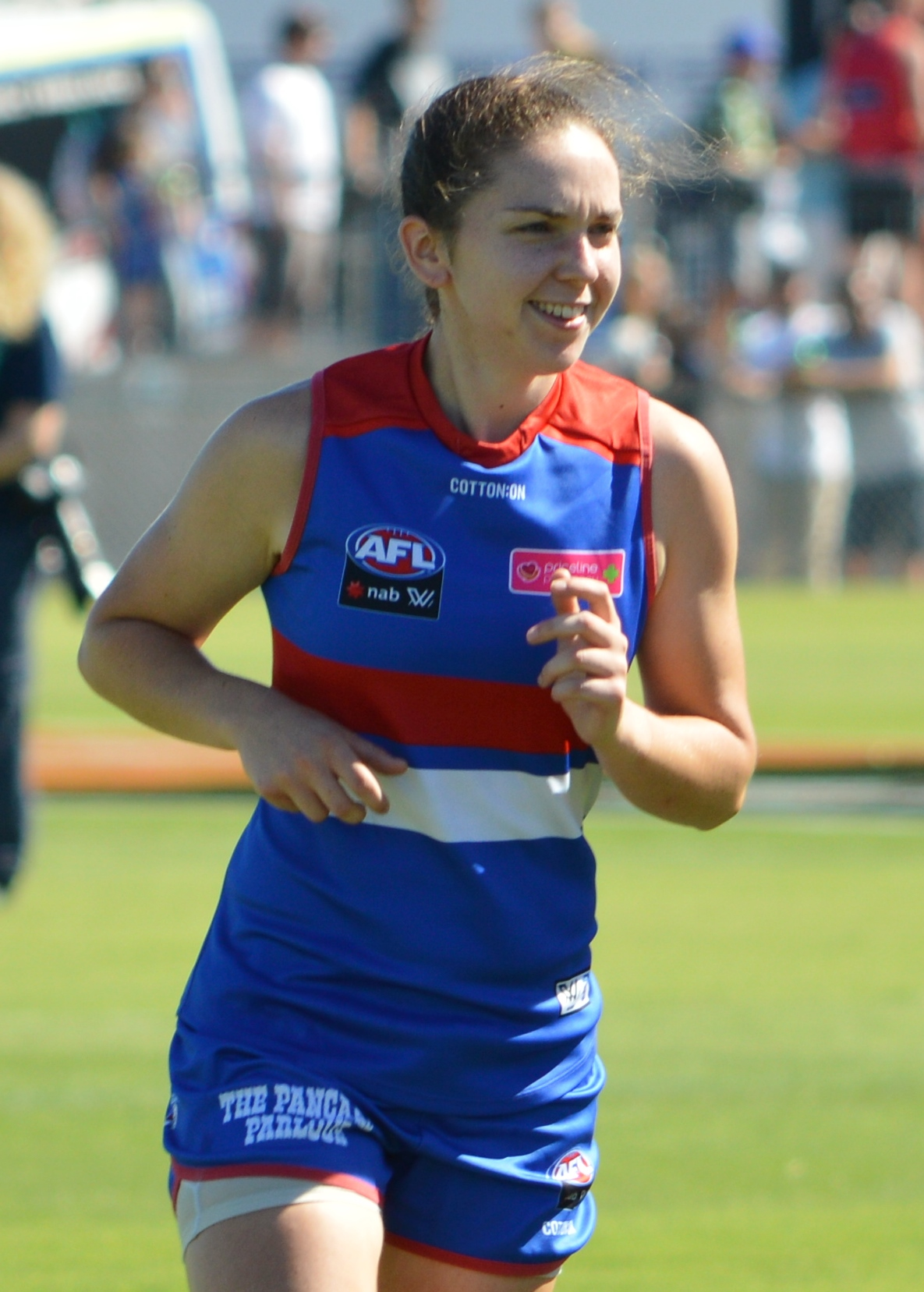
- Ferres playing for the Western Bulldogs in February 2018

Personal information
- Born: 26 October 1997 (age 29)
- Original team: Western Spurs (VFL Women's)
- Draft: No. 3, 2017 AFLW rookie draft
- Debut: Round 1, 2018, Western Bulldogs vs. Fremantle, at VU Whitten Oval
- Height: 164 cm (5 ft 5 in)
- Position: Midfielder

Club information
- Current club: Western Bulldogs
- Number: 16

Playing career^{1}
Years	Club	Games (Goals)
2018–2025	Western Bulldogs	56 (1)
- ^{1} Playing statistics correct to the end of the 2023 season.

Career highlights
- AFL Women's Rising Star nominee: 2018; AFL Women's Premiership Player: 2018

Naomi Ferres (born 26 October 1997) is an Australian rules footballer playing for the Western Bulldogs in the AFL Women's (AFLW). Ferres was drafted by the Western Bulldogs with the club's first selection and the third pick overall in the 2017 AFL Women's rookie draft from the VU Western Spurs . She was upgraded to the Bulldogs' main playing list following an injury to Kimberley Ebb and subsequently made her debut in the twenty-six point win against Fremantle at VU Whitten Oval in the opening round of the 2018 season. Ferres received a nomination for the 2018 AFL Women's Rising Star award in the Bulldogs' round 7 win over Melbourne.

Ferres went on to win the 2018 AFL Women's Grand Final and took a crucial mark in the defensive 50 just before the siren to deny the Brisbane Lions a chance to tie the game. It was revealed that Ferres had signed a contract extension with the club on 16 June 2021, after playing 8 out of 9 games for the club that season.

At the end of the 2025 AFL Women's season she was delisted by the Western Bulldogs.

== Statistics ==
Statistics are correct to the end of the 2021 season.

Legend
G	Goals	K	Kicks	D	Disposals	T	Tackles
B	Behinds	H	Handballs	M	Marks

Season	Team	No.	Games	Totals							Averages (per game)							Votes
Season	Team	No.	Games	G	B	K	H	D	M	T	G	B	K	H	D	M	T	Votes
2018	Western Bulldogs	16	8	0	0	35	24	59	11	18	0.0	0.0	4.4	3.0	7.4	1.4	2.3	0
2019	Western Bulldogs	16	7	1	0	23	20	43	6	19	0.1	0.0	3.3	2.9	6.1	0.9	2.7	0
2020	Western Bulldogs	16	6	0	0	31	29	60	9	16	0.0	0.0	5.2	4.8	10.0	1.5	2.7	0
2021	Western Bulldogs	16	8	0	0	44	44	88	14	17	0.0	0.0	5.5	5.5	11.0	1.8	2.1	0
Career			29	1	0	133	117	250	40	70	0.1	0.0	4.6	4.0	8.6	1.4	2.4	0
