= Sophie Conway =

Australian rules footballer

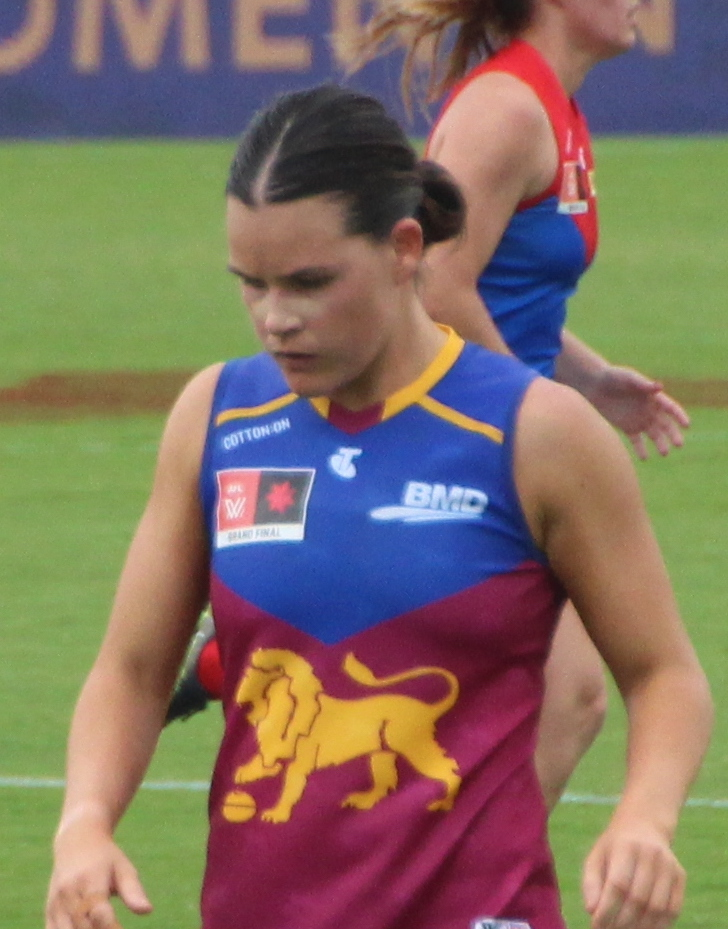
- Conway playing for Brisbane in the season seven Grand Final (2022)

Personal information
- Full name: Sophie Conway
- Born: 6 April 1999 (age 27)
- Original team: Zillmere (QWAFL)
- Draft: No. 45, 2017 AFL Women's draft
- Debut: Round 1, 2018, Brisbane vs. Adelaide, at Norwood Oval
- Height: 170 cm (5 ft 7 in)
- Position: Midfielder/forward

Club information
- Current club: Brisbane
- Number: 12

Playing career^{1}
Years	Club	Games (Goals)
2018–	Brisbane	60 (37)
- ^{1} Playing statistics correct to the end of 2023.

Career highlights
- 2× AFLW premiership player: 2021, 2023; AFL Women's All-Australian team: 2023; AFL Women's Rising Star nominee: 2018

Sophie Conway (born 6 April 1999) is an Australian rules footballer playing for the Brisbane Lions in the AFL Women's competition (AFLW).

Conway was raised in Bracken Ridge, Queensland and attended St Rita's College. She was a talented hockey and Australian rules player, making the Under 18 All Australian teams in both sports. She was playing for Zillmere in the AFL Queensland Women's League when she was drafted by Brisbane with the 45th pick in the 2017 AFL Women's draft.

Conway made her debut in the Lions' round 1 game against Adelaide at Norwood Oval on 3 February 2018. A fortnight later she received a nomination for the 2018 AFL Women's Rising Star award after kicking two goals in her side's round 3 win over Carlton.

Conway's brother Isaac Conway plays for Port Melbourne Football Club in the Victorian Football League (VFL).
