= 2018 AFL Women's best and fairest =

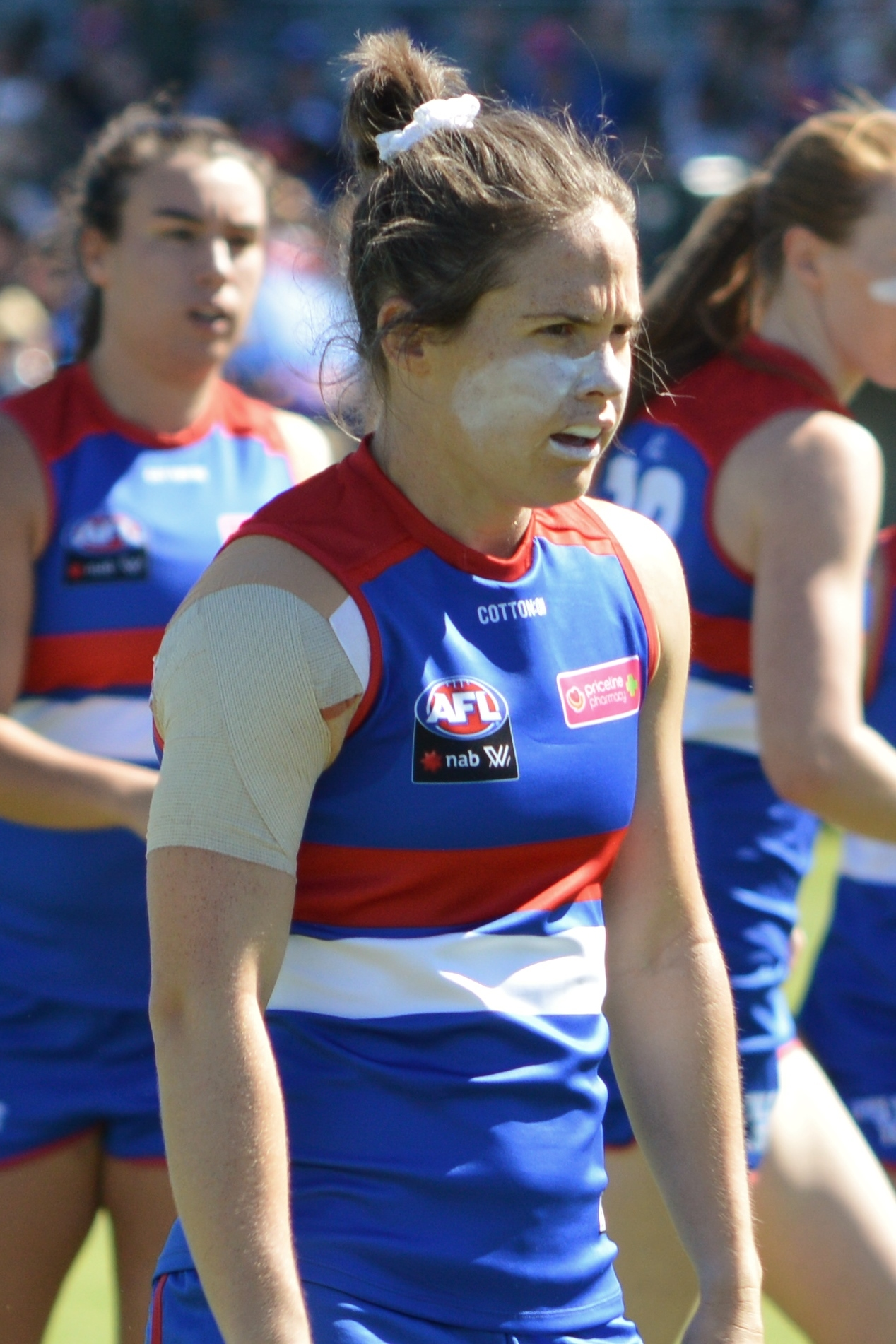
- 2018 AFL Women's best and fairest winner Emma Kearney
- Date: 27 March
- Location: Docklands Stadium
- Hosted by: Neroli Meadows
- Winner(s): Emma Kearney; Western Bulldogs (14 votes)

Television/radio coverage
- Network: Fox Footy

The 2018 AFL Women's best and fairest was the second year the award was presented to the player adjudged the best and fairest player during the AFL Women's (AFLW) home-and-away season. Emma Kearney of the Western Bulldogs won the award with 14 votes.

== Leading votegetters ==
Placing	Player	Votes
1st	Emma Kearney (Western Bulldogs)	14
=2nd	Courtney Gum (Greater Western Sydney)	9
=2nd	Dana Hooker (Fremantle)	9
=2nd	Chloe Molloy (Collingwood)	9
=5th	Ellie Blackburn (Western Bulldogs)	6
=5th	Sabrina Frederick-Traub (Brisbane)	6
=5th	Ebony Marinoff (Adelaide)	6
=5th	Daisy Pearce (Melbourne)	6
=5th	Chelsea Randall (Adelaide)	6
10th	Karen Paxman (Melbourne)	5

== Voting procedure ==
The three field umpires (the umpires who control the flow of the game, as opposed to goal or boundary umpires) confer after each match and award three votes, two votes and one vote to the players they regard as the best, second-best and third-best in the match, respectively. The votes are kept secret until the awards night, and are read and tallied on the evening.
