= Libby Birch =

Australian rules footballer

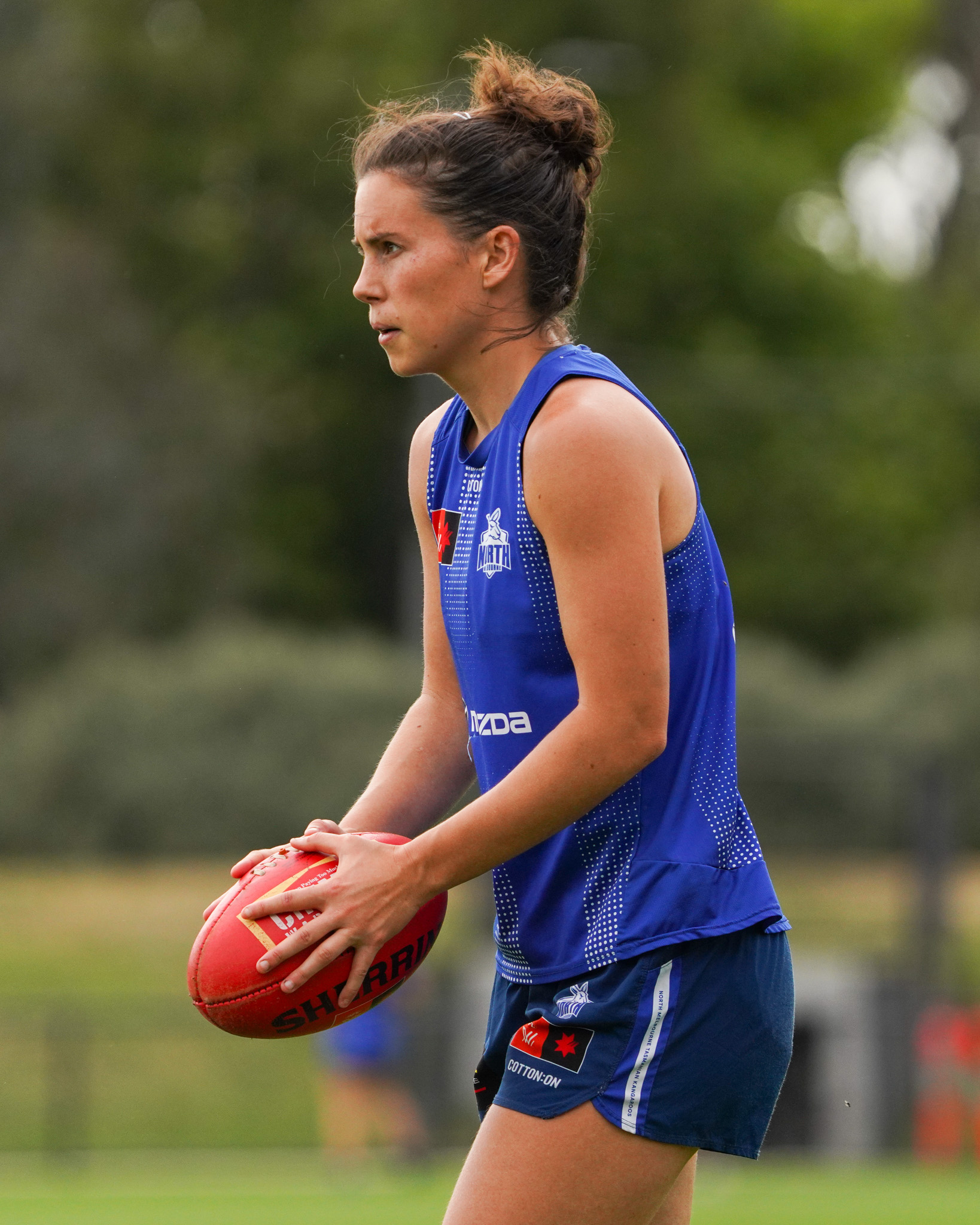

Personal information
- Full name: Elizabeth Birch
- Born: 3 December 1997 (age 28)
- Original team: Darebin Falcons (VFL Women's)
- Debut: Round 1, 2017, Western Bulldogs vs. Fremantle, at VU Whitten Oval
- Height: 176 cm (5 ft 9 in)
- Position: Defender

Club information
- Current club: North Melbourne

Playing career^{1}
Years	Club	Games (Goals)
2017–2019	Western Bulldogs	22 (1)
2020–2023	Melbourne	55 (0)
2024–	North Melbourne	29 (0)
Total		106 (1)
- ^{1} Playing statistics correct to the end of the 2024 season.

Career highlights
- AFL Women's Rising Star nominee: 2018; 4× AFL Women's premiership player: 2018, 2022 (S7), 2024, 2025; 2× 22under22 team: 2017–2019, 2020; 2× AFL Women's All-Australian team: 2020, 2022 (S6); 2x VFLW premiership player: 2016, 2017

Libby Birch (born 3 December 1997) is an Australian rules footballer who plays for North Melbourne in the AFL Women's (AFLW). She previously played for the Western Bulldogs and Melbourne. She previously played netball and captained Victoria at the National Netball Championships. Birch is currently studying a Physiotherapy degree at La Trobe University. In 2016, Birch switched from netball to Australian rules football and was recruited by the Western Bulldogs as a rookie after having only played football for three months for the Darebin Falcons in the VFL Women's.

== Sporting background ==
In April 2016, Birch won a silver medal for netball when Victoria finished runners-up at the under 21 national championships. After the tournament, Daisy Pearce from the Darebin Falcons made contact with Birch and invited her to trial for the inaugural AFL Women's season. Prior to 18 June 2016, she had never kicked a football but only ten weeks later, Birch played and won a VFL Women's premiership with her team, Darebin. In 2015, she had also won the Victorian Netball League grand final (championship division) with Boroondarah Express.

== AFL Women's career ==
In 2017, Birch played all seven games for the Western Bulldogs as a 19-year old rookie. She made her AFL Women's (AFLW) debut in the opening round against Fremantle and played as a half back and also on the wing but her overall athletic profile allows her the ability to play any position. In the off-season of the AFLW, she continues to play for Darebin in the VFL Women's. In May 2017, she re-signed with the Western Bulldogs on to the senior list for the 2018 AFLW season.

Birch was one of two round 2 nominees for the 2018 AFL Women's Rising Star award after a strong defensive tagging role and six disposal match against Brisbane in February 2018. She went on to run fifth in the bulldogs best and fairest count, play in their premiership win and make the All Australian Squad. Birch also won the competitions AFLW rebel young leader award for 2018.

After playing every game in AFLW season 3, Birch finished 5th again in the Bulldogs best and fairest. On the last day of the AFLW April 2019 sign and trade period Melbourne secured Birch for at least the next 2 seasons. The Western Bulldogs finally agreed to terms with Birch being traded for Ashleigh Guest plus picks 8 and 48.

In April 2019, Birch was traded to Melbourne, while Ashleigh Guest joined the Western Bulldogs.

In her first season for Melbourne in 2020, Libby won the clubs Trademark Award along with finishing 5th in the Best and Fairest. In addition to this, Libby was picked in the AFLW All Australian Team as well as the AFLPA 22Under22 All Australian Team. Libby was also a nominee for the AFLPA's MVP Award and Most Courageous.

Outside of her on-field playing ability, Birch also featured in a special comments role for SEN's AFLW Commentary as well as playing a prominent role in NAB AFL Auskick at Home Content Series, motivating kids to stay active during the COVID-19 lockdown periods. Birch joined Melbourne's leadership group in the 2021 AFLW season. In 2022 season 6, Birch was again named in the All-Australian team, and in 2022 season 7 she won an AFLW premiership for the second time. This made her the first woman to win a premiership for two different AFLW clubs. Birch continues to write for The Age and feature as a specialist for the Seven Network. In 2023, Birch covered AFL for 3AW as an expert commentator.

In December 2023, Birch was traded to North Melbourne, in exchange for a first round pick. Birch went on to become the first player in V-AFL/AFLW history to Win three premierships at three different clubs. In round 9 of the 2025 AFL Women's season, Birch became just the third player in history to play 100 consecutive AFLW games and also holds the record for the most ever intercepts and spoils in the league's history. Birch is also the only player to have won the first game in each of the ten AFLW seasons to date and to have won against every team in the competition. Since joining North Melbourne, Birch has not lost a match, which has coincided with the club winning the 2024 and 2025 AFLW premierships, as well as being undefeated in 29 matches. Birch has won more premierships (four, and all against the Brisbane Lions) and the most games of any player in AFLW history. In season 10 Birch was selected in the All Australian squad for the fourth time and recorded a third place finish in the prestigious North Melbourne best and fairest Award.

== Statistics ==
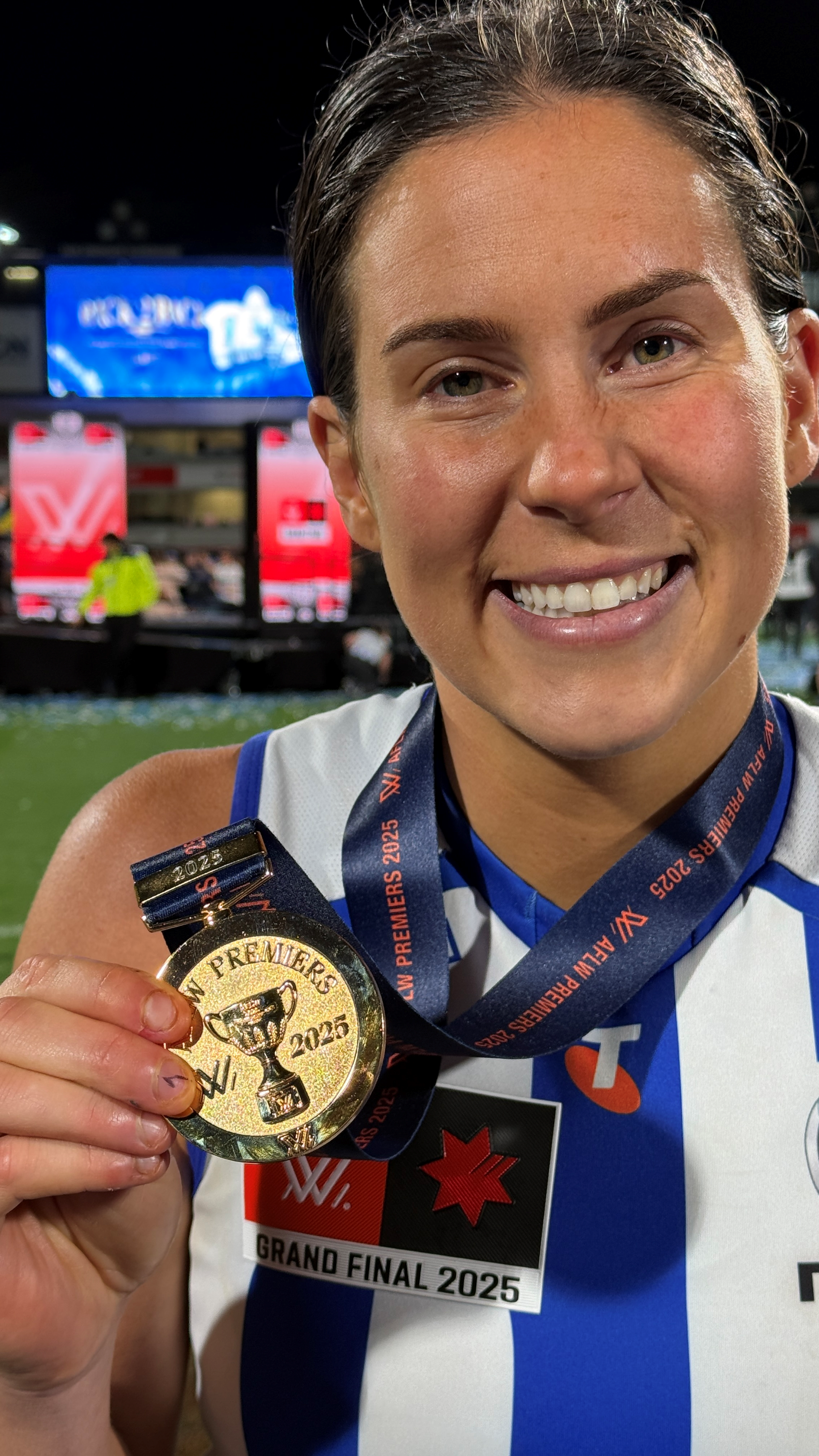
In 2025, Birch became the first player to win four AFL Women's premiership medals

Updated to the end of the 2025 season.

Legend
G	Goals	K	Kicks	D	Disposals	T	Tackles
B	Behinds	H	Handballs	M	Marks
#	Played in that season's premiership team

Season	Team	No.	Games	Totals							Averages (per game)							Votes
Season	Team	No.	Games	G	B	K	H	D	M	T	G	B	K	H	D	M	T	Votes
2017	Western Bulldogs	18	7	0	0	24	28	52	3	13	0.0	0.0	3.4	4.0	7.4	0.4	1.9	0
2018^{#}	Western Bulldogs	18	8	0	0	36	16	52	10	29	0.0	0.0	4.5	2.0	6.5	1.2	3.6	1
2019	Western Bulldogs	18	7	1	0	46	18	64	18	25	0.1	0.1	6.6	2.6	9.1	2.6	3.6	0
2020	Melbourne	9	7	0	0	68	17	85	25	11	0.0	0.0	9.7	2.4	12.1	3.6	1.6	0
2021	Melbourne	9	11	0	0	54	18	72	9	12	0.0	0.0	4.9	1.6	6.5	0.8	1.1	0
2022 (S6)	Melbourne	9	12	0	0	108	37	145	37	23	0.0	0.0	9.0	3.1	12.1	3.1	1.9	0
2022 (S7)^{#}	Melbourne	9	13	0	0	121	48	169	44	29	0.0	0.0	9.9	3.7	13.0	3.4	2.2	0
2023	Melbourne	9	12	0	1	64	34	98	28	22	0.0	0.1	5.3	2.8	8.2	2.3	1.8	0
2024^{#}	North Melbourne	2	14	0	0	115	47	162	44	21	0.0	0.0	8.2	3.4	11.6	3.1	1.5	0
2025^{#}	North Melbourne	2	15	0	0	152	83	235	72	32	0.0	0.0	10.1	5.5	15.7	4.8	2.1	1
Career			106	1	1	788	346	1134	290	217	0.0	0.0	7.4	3.3	10.7	2.7	2.0	2

== Sporting achievements ==
- Victorian state hockey team and open state league team in 2011 and 2012 (Footscray Hockey Club)
- Captain Victorian state netball team — gold medallist in the National Championships from 2011 to 2014
- Australian netball underage squad member in 2012, 2013, 2014
- Victorian Institute of Sport full scholarship from 2013 to 2015
- Victorian Netball League grand final player — Premiership winners in the Championship division with the Boroondara Netball Club in 2015
- Most valuable player Victorian Netball League in 2016 (Boroondara Netball Club)
- Under 21 and Australian Netball League squad (Victoria) in 2016 and 2017
- Western Bulldogs AFLW player, inaugural 2017 season
- VFL Women's premiership player 2016 and 2017 Darebin Falcons
- Nab Rising Star Nominee 2018
- All Australian AFLW squad selection 2018
- rebel 2018 AFLW young leader award winner
- Western Bulldogs AFLW premiership player 2018
- Western Bulldogs VFLW 3rd place Best & Fairest 2018
- VFL Women's Team of the Year selection 2018 and 2019
- Casey Demons Runner Up Best & Fairest 2019
- 2019 Inaugural Western Bulldogs Community Service Award.
- Melbourne AFLW Trademark Award 2020
- Melbourne AFLW 5th Place Best & Fairest 2020
- AFLPA MVP Nominee 2020
- AFLPA Most Courageous Nominee 2020
- AFLW All Australian Team - Centre half back 2020
- AFLW 22Under22 All Australian Team 2017,2018,2019,2020
- First V-AFL/AFLW player to win a premiership with 3 clubs (Western Bulldogs, Melbourne & North Melbourne)
- first Victorian player to reach 100 games
- First AFLW player to win 4 Premierships.
- Third place finish in the 2025 North Melbourne Best and fairest Award .
