= Chloe Molloy =

Australian rules footballer (born 1998)

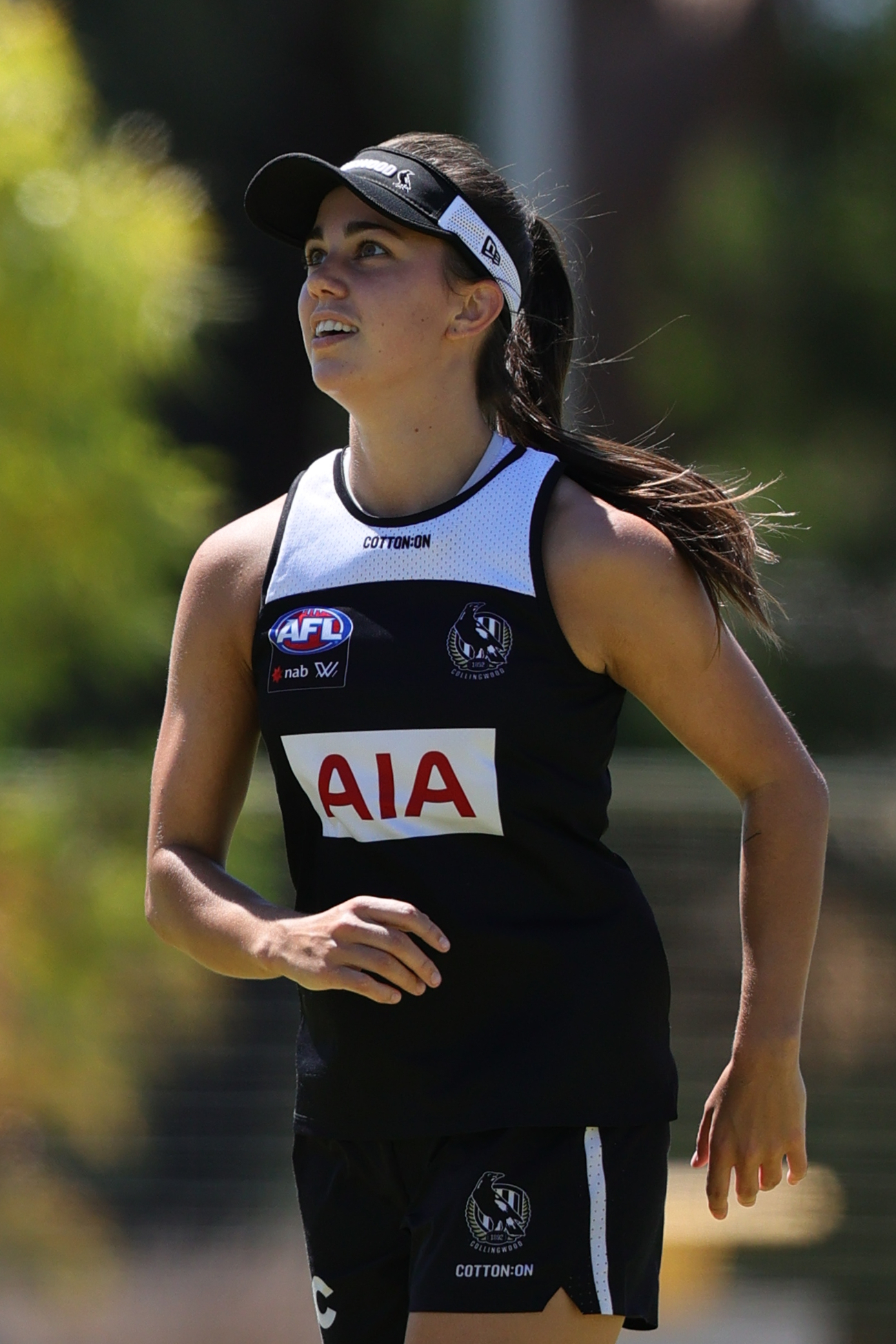
- Molloy training with Collingwood in 2022

Personal information
- Full name: Chloe Molloy
- Born: 6 December 1998 (age 27)
- Original team: Diamond Creek (VFLW)
- Draft: No. 3, 2017 national draft
- Debut: Round 1, 2018, Collingwood vs. Carlton, at Ikon Park
- Height: 171 cm (5 ft 7 in)
- Position: Forward / defender

Club information
- Current club: Sydney
- Number: 5

Playing career^{1}
Years	Club	Games (Goals)
2018–2022 (S7)	Collingwood	47 (37)
2023–	Sydney	37 (74)
Total		84 (111)
- ^{1} Playing statistics correct to the end of the 2026 season.

Career highlights
- Sydney co-captain: 2023–2025; AFLW Leading Goalkicker Medal: 2026; 3× AFL Women's All-Australian team: 2018, 2021, 2023; Collingwood best and fairest: 2018; 2× Collingwood leading goalkicker: 2021, S6; Sydney leading goalkicker: 2023, 2025, 2026; AFL Women's Rising Star: 2018; AFLPA AFLW best first year player: 2018

Chloe Molloy (born 6 December 1998) is an Australian rules footballer playing for the Sydney Swans in the AFL Women's (AFLW). She previously played for the Collingwood Football Club from 2018 to 2022(S7). Molloy is a three-time AFL Women's All-Australian, and won the AFL Women's Rising Star and Collingwood best and fairest awards in 2018. She also led Collingwood's goalkicking in 2021 and 2022(S6), and Sydney's goalkicking in 2023, 2025 and 2026, as well as winning the AFLW Leading Goalkicker award in 2026 additionally. Molloy has served as Sydney co-captain since the 2023 season but has stepped down from the captaincy for the 2026 season.

== Early life ==
Molloy grew up in Whittlesea, in Melbourne's outer north-east. She attended school at Assumption College, Kilmore. Molloy's uncle is former Fitzroy, Brisbane Lions, and Collingwood player Jarrod Molloy. Molloy was a Collingwood supporter growing up.

== Basketball career ==
Molloy begun playing basketball from a young age, she played for Diamond Valley and Eltham during her junior years. During her senior years she played for Nunawading in the SEABL and Melbourne Boomers in the WNBL.

In 2015 she received the Melbourne Boomers Rookie of the Year award. In the same year, Molloy also was announced as a member of the 2016 Australian Gems squad.

Molloy represented Victoria Country and Victoria Metro at state level six times, winning two national championships at the Victorian Under-20 and Ivor Burge Championships in Ipswich and Bendigo.

In 2017 she was offered NCAA Division 1 US College Scholarships from Virginia Cavaliers, Fordham Rams and Virginia Commonwealth University.

Molloy turned down any college scholarships to pursue her football dream.

== Junior and state league football ==
In 2017 she played football both the Calder Cannons in the TAC Cup and Diamond Creek in the VFL Women's competition. She was well credentialled in both leagues, winning the TAC Cup's league best and fairest and leading goalkicker awards before tying AFLW Western Bulldogs star Katie Brennan for the VFLW's league leading goalkicker award.

In her first year in senior football at Diamond Creek, Molloy took out the club's Leading Goal Kicker award, as well as Runner's Up Best and Fairest at just age 18.

== AFL Women's career ==
Molloy was drafted by Collingwood with the club's first pick and the third selection overall in the 2017 AFL Women's draft.

She made her league debut in round 1, 2018 in a match against Carlton at IKON Park. She played in a defensive role, gathered a game high 20 disposals and was named by AFL Media as one of Collingwood's best players in the eight-point loss. Molloy received a nomination or the 2018 AFL Women's Rising Star award for the performance.

She ultimately won the AFL Women's Rising Star award with a perfect 50 votes, and placed second in the league's best and fairest.

Molloy was the youngest player to also be selected in the 2018 AFLW All-Australian Team in the back pocket.

A week-and-a-half later, she also won Collingwood's AFLW best and fairest award, as well as Best First Year Player award.

Molloy was also named the AFLPA's inaugural AFLW Players' Best First-Year Player Award in 2018.

In May 2018, Molloy was re-signed by Collingwood for the 2019 season.

In September of that year she suffered a serious Lisfranc injury to her right foot while playing with Collingwood's VFLW team, the recovery from which saw her ruled out for the entirety of the 2019 AFLW season.

For the 2019 season Molloy took on a new role working alongside Collingwood list manager and performance analyst Jess Burger as an opposition analyst. She was also appointed part of the Collingwood AFLW leadership group ahead of the 2019 season.

In April 2019, Molloy re-signed with Collingwood for the 2020 season.

In March 2020, Molloy was selected by the AFL Players Association as captain of their inaugural 22under22 squad, as well as being selected for a 2017–19 retrospective 22under22 squad.

Molloy kicked two goals in Collingwood's one-goal victory over Carlton in the opening game of the 2021 AFL Women's season, being named as one of the team's best on ground. Molloy was awarded with her second All-Australian blazer, named on the full forward position in the 2021 AFL Women's All-Australian team.

It was revealed in May 2021 that although premiership contenders Melbourne, premiers Brisbane, and new expansion club St Kilda had made attempts to sign her at their respective clubs, she decided to stay at Collingwood on a two-year deal.

In February 2023, it was revealed that Molloy will leave Collingwood in the new Priority signing period, joining Sydney on a five-year contract.

In September 2024, Molloy sustained a season-ending ACL injury.

Molloy won the AFLW Leading Goalkicker award and set a new AFLW record in 2026, overtaking Jacqueline Parry (who had broken the record 2 days prior) after kicking 4 goals in the last match of the home-and-away season to finish with a tally of 28 goals. The record before this was 25 goals, a feat achieved by Port Adelaide's Indy Tahau the previous season. Molloy continued her excellent goal-kicking form in 2026 through the AFLW finals series kicking 7 goals in 3 games, pushing her tally to 35 for the year.

== Statistics ==
Updated to the end of the 2026 season.

Legend
G	Goals	K	Kicks	D	Disposals	T	Tackles
B	Behinds	H	Handballs	M	Marks
†	Led the league for the season

Season	Team	No.	Games	Totals							Averages (per game)							Votes
Season	Team	No.	Games	G	B	K	H	D	M	T	G	B	K	H	D	M	T	Votes
2018	Collingwood	2	7	1	2	81	19	100	25	16	0.1	0.3	11.6	2.7	14.3	3.6	2.3	9
2019	Collingwood	2	0	—	—	—	—	—	—	—	—	—	—	—	—	—	—	0
2020	Collingwood	2	7	6	4	59	34	93	32^{†}	16	0.9	0.6	8.4	4.9	13.3	4.6	2.3	3
2021	Collingwood	2	11	16	6	66	28	94	27	12	1.5	0.5	6.0	2.5	8.5	2.0	1.1	6
2022 (S6)	Collingwood	2	10	8	6	73	38	111	26	22	0.8	0.6	7.3	3.8	11.1	2.6	2.2	4
2022 (S7)	Collingwood	2	12	6	10	116	44	160	32	61	0.5	0.8	9.7	3.7	13.3	2.7	5.1	12
2023	Sydney	5	12	18	13	134	64	198	38	52	1.5	1.1	11.2	5.3	16.5	3.2	4.3	5
2024	Sydney	5	1	2	0	6	6	12	1	2	2.0^{†}	0.0	6.0	6.0	12.0	1.0	2.0	0
2025	Sydney	5	9	19	9	90	42	132	32	31	2.1^{†}	1.0	10.0	4.7	14.7	3.6	3.4	5
2026	Sydney	5	15	35^{†}	22^{†}	181	66	247	49	53	2.3	1.5^{†}	12.1	4.4	16.5	3.2	3.4	0
Career			84	111	72	807	341	1148	262	265	1.3	0.9	9.6	4.1	13.7	3.1	3.2	55

== Honours and achievements ==
Team

- McClelland Trophy: (Sydney) 2026

Individual

- Sydney co-captain: 2023–present
- AFLW Leading Goalkicker Medal: 2026
- 3× AFL Women's All-Australian team: 2018, 2021, 2023
- Collingwood best and fairest: 2018
- 2× Collingwood leading goalkicker: 2021, S6
- Sydney leading goalkicker: 2023, 2025, 2026
- AFL Women's Rising Star: 2018
- AFLPA AFLW best first year player: 2018
