= Emma Kearney (footballer) =

Australian rules footballer and cricketer (born 1989)

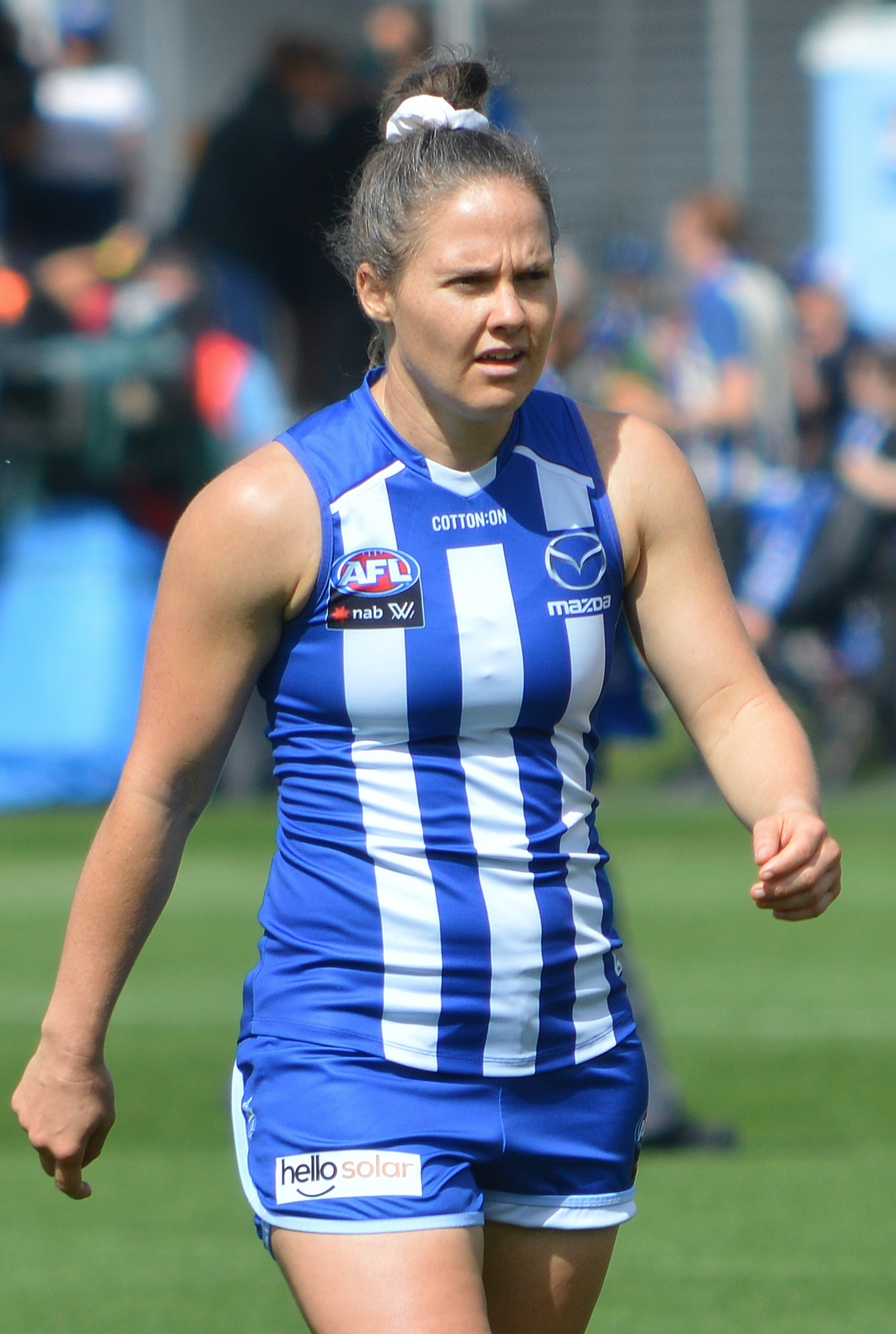
- Kearney with North Melbourne in March 2021

Personal information
- Full name: Emma Michelle Kearney
- Born: 24 September 1989 (age 37); Hamilton, Victoria
- Original team: Melbourne University (VFLW)
- Draft: 2016 priority player
- Debut: Round 1, 2017, Western Bulldogs vs. Fremantle, at VU Whitten Oval
- Height: 165 cm (5 ft 5 in)
- Position: Midfielder

Club information
- Current club: North Melbourne
- Number: 9

Playing career^{1}
Years	Club	Games (Goals)
2017–2018	Western Bulldogs	15 (3)
2019–	North Melbourne	79 (10)
Total		94 (13)

Representative team honours^{2}
Years	Team	Games (Goals)
2017	Victoria	1 (1)
- ^{1} Playing statistics correct to the end of the 2025 season.^{2} Representative statistics correct as of 2017.

Career highlights
- AFLW: 3× AFL Women's premiership player: 2018, 2024 (c), 2025; AFL Women's best and fairest: 2018; 8× AFL Women's All-Australian team: 2017, 2018, 2019, 2020, 2021, 2022 (S6), 2022 (S7), 2023; 2× Western Bulldogs best and fairest: 2017, 2018; AFL Coaches Association AFLW Champion Player of the Year: 2018; VWFL/VFLW: 5× Melbourne University best and fairest: 2011, 2012, 2013, 2014, 2016

Emma Michelle Kearney (born 24 September 1989) is an Australian rules footballer, coach and former cricketer. A decorated midfielder in the AFL Women's (AFLW) competition, Kearney won the league's best and fairest award while playing for the Western Bulldogs in 2018 and has played for North Melbourne since 2019, captaining the team from 2019 to 2024. She previously played cricket for the Melbourne Stars in the Women's Big Bash League (WBBL) and for Victoria in the Women's National Cricket League (WNCL).

== Early life ==
Kearney was born in the Victorian town of Hamilton, and raised on a sheep station in nearby Cavendish. She played football through her early years, but was forced to give up the sport at the age of twelve when barred from playing with the youth boys team.

She attended high school at Monivae College in Hamilton.

== Australian rules football ==
=== State league and representative football ===
Kearney returned to football while studying a physical education teaching degree at university in Ballarat. She began playing state league football in 2010, joining Melbourne University in the Victorian Women's Football League (VWFL). Kearney won her club's best and fairest award five times, and she was a member of the 2016 grand final team that ultimately lost to the Darebin Falcons.

In 2013, Kearney was a member of the triumphant Victorian team at the AFL Women's National Championship in Cairns. That same year, she was selected by the Western Bulldogs with the tenth overall pick in the first national women's draft, and played for the club in AFL-sanctioned exhibition matches through to the end of 2016.

=== AFL Women's career ===
==== Western Bulldogs ====
Kearney was signed by the Western Bulldogs as a priority player in August 2016 as part of the inaugural AFL Women's draft. Per the newly formed league's rules, her off-field work at the club made her eligible for the special pre-draft signing. She faced a limited pre-season, missing eight training sessions due to cricketing commitments across the 2016–17 summer.

Making her AFLW debut in the club's inaugural match, in round one of the 2017 season against Fremantle at VU Whitten Oval, Kearney recorded a game-high 23 disposals on the night. In round six against Brisbane at South Pine Sports Complex, she gathered 30 disposals during the match, becoming the competition's first player to achieve the feat. At the end of the 2017 season, Kearney was listed in the All-Australian team and finished equal-first in her club's best and fairest count alongside Ellie Blackburn.

Having re-signed with the Western Bulldogs during the trade period in May 2017, Kearney enjoyed a standout individual 2018 season, winning the league's best and fairest and the AFL Coaches Champion Player of the Year (tied with Chelsea Randall from Adelaide) awards. She also shared in ultimate team success as the Bulldogs defeated Brisbane in the 2018 AFL Women's Grand Final. With five minutes left in the match, Kearney ran down Kaitlyn Ashmore to win a crucial holding-the-ball free kick. She subsequently converted a set shot 30 metres out from goal to give her team a twelve-point lead and help clinch the premiership.

==== North Melbourne ====
In April 2018, Kearney accepted an offer to play with expansion club North Melbourne for the 2019 season. In November 2018, she was announced as the inaugural captain of the team. In each of the following three seasons, Kearney finished runner-up in the club's best and fairest award. She also polled well in the 2020 league best and fairest count, receiving eleven votes to place third.

Kearney earned her fifth consecutive All-Australian selection in 2021, making her one of only two players to manage the accomplishment (the other being Karen Paxman from Melbourne). In June 2021, North Melbourne confirmed she was contracted with the club for the following season.

Kearney was forced to miss the first round of 2022 AFLW season 6 after contracting COVID-19. She returned shortly thereafter and became a consistent player across both the backline and in the midfield. She was named captain of the 2022 season 6 All-Australian team, and her presence in the team made her the only player in the history of the competition to feature in all six of the league's first six representative teams.

=== Coaching career ===
In May 2026 Kearney was appointed coach of North Melbourne Werribee in a caretaker capacity, after long-serving coach Brett Gourley departed the club. She coached the Kangaroos to victory in her inaugural game, leading the side to a 44-point victory over Port Melbourne.

== Cricket ==
Emma Kearney
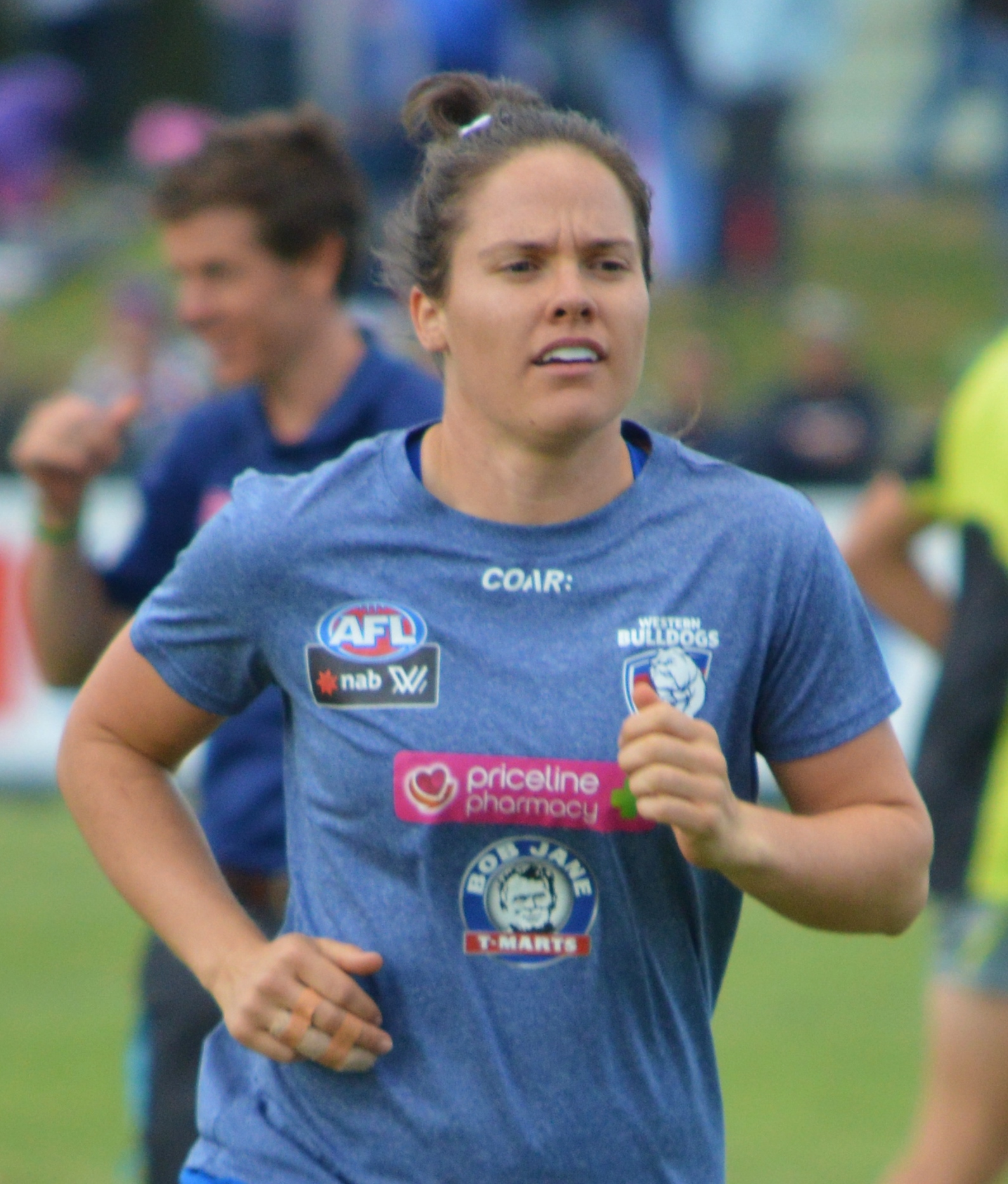

Cricket information
- Batting: Right-handed
- Bowling: Right-arm medium

Domestic team information
- Years: Team
- 2013/14–2016/17: Victorian Spirit
- 2015/16–2017/18: Melbourne Stars

Career statistics
Competition	List A	Twenty20
Matches	21	43
Runs scored	55	83
Batting average	13.75	5.18
100s/50s	0/0	0/0
Top score	30*	23
Balls bowled	816	811
Wickets	11	20
Bowling average	50.09	41.75
5 wickets in innings	0	0
10 wickets in match	0	0
Best bowling	2/13	3/13
Catches/stumpings	3/–	4/–
- Source: CricketArchive, 5 October 2025

Kearney played grade cricket for Essendon Maribyrnong Park Ladies Cricket Club in Melbourne's inner-north. She was selected for the Victorian Spirit during the 2013–14 season for the first time, and played 20 WNCL matches with the team through to the end of the 2016–17 season.

Having been signed by the Melbourne Stars ahead of the inaugural WBBL season, Kearney took seven wickets from twelve matches in 2015–16, then claimed eight wickets from fourteen matches at an economy rate of 5.27 in 2016–17.

=== Dual sports controversy ===
Kearney garnered media attention in December 2016 on account of her dual-sports status. She revealed that she had been asked by Cricket Australia to sign documents committing her to prioritise cricket training and matches over AFL Women's training sessions held during the cricket season. At the time, Kearney voiced public criticism of the decision by cricket bosses in light of the semi-professional nature of the league.

== Personal life ==
Outside of cricket and football, Kearney has worked as a physical education teacher, including at Mount Alexander College in Flemington. She holds a bachelor of physical education from Ballarat University. As part of her move to play football for North Melbourne, Kearney accepted employment as sport and recreation coordinator at the club's community organization, The Huddle.

Kearney's partner is Kate Shierlaw, a fellow footballer who has played for Carlton and captained St Kilda.

== AFL Women's statistics ==
Statistics are correct to the end of the 2021 season.

Legend
G	Goals	K	Kicks	D	Disposals	T	Tackles
B	Behinds	H	Handballs	M	Marks
#	Played in that season's premiership team	†	Led the league for the season	±	Won that season's AFLW B&F

Season	Team	No.	Games	Totals							Averages (per game)							Votes
Season	Team	No.	Games	G	B	K	H	D	M	T	G	B	K	H	D	M	T	Votes
2017	Western Bulldogs	5	7	0	4	82	68	150	17	20	0.0	0.6	11.7	9.7	21.4	2.4	2.9	7
2018^{#}	Western Bulldogs	5	8	3	5	123^{†}	29	152^{†}	27	41	0.4	0.6	15.4^{†}	3.6	19.0^{†}	3.4	5.1	14^{±}
2019	North Melbourne	9	7	1	2	96	45	141	22	36	0.1	0.3	13.7	6.4	20.1	3.1	5.1	3
2020	North Melbourne	9	7	3	1	91	53	144	24	31	0.4	0.1	13.0	7.6	20.6	3.4	4.4	11
2021	North Melbourne	9	10	4	3	118	90	208	28	46	0.4	0.3	11.8	9.0	20.8	2.8	4.6	4
2022 (S6)	North Melbourne	3	10	1	0	116	75	191	40	17	0.1	0.0	11.6	7.5	19.1	4.0	1.7	
2022 (S7)	North Melbourne	9	12	1	1	129	62	191	41	38	0.1	0.1	10.8	5.2	15.9	3.5	3.2	
2023	North Melbourne	9	13	0	0	175	86	261	43	32	0.0	0.0	13.5	6.6	20.1	3.3	2.5	
2024^{#}	North Melbourne	9	8	0	0	92	39	131	16	16	0.0	0.0	11.5	4.9	16.40	2.0	2.0	
Career			82	13	16	1022	547	1559	259	277	0.2	0.2	12.5	6.7	19.1	3.2	3.4	39
