= AFL Women's Rising Star =

- Previous: 2025 AFL Women's Rising Star
- Awarded for: The best young player in the AFL Women's
- Sponsored by: Telstra
- Location: Crown Melbourne
- Country: Australia
- First award: 2017
- Currently held by: Zippy Fish (Sydney)
- Website: AFLW Rising Star Award

Television/radio coverage
- Network: Fox Footy

The AFL Women's Rising Star award is presented annually to the best young player in the AFL Women's (AFLW) during the home-and-away season. The first award was awarded in 2017. The award has been sponsored by Telstra since 2024.

== Eligibility and voting procedure ==
To be eligible for nomination, a player must be under 21 years of age on 1 January of that year and not have been previously nominated. Players suspended during the season may be nominated, but cannot win. At the end of the season, each member of a voting panel, which also selects the AFL Women's All-Australian team, awards five votes, four votes, three votes, two votes and one vote to the nominated players they judge the best to fifth-best during the season respectively; the player with the highest total of votes wins.

== Winners ==
Season	Winner	Club	Recruited	Ref.
2017	Ebony Marinoff	Adelaide	2016 AFL Women's draft, selection 7	
2018	Chloe Molloy	Collingwood	2017 AFL Women's draft, selection 3	
2019	Maddy Prespakis	Carlton	2018 AFL Women's draft, selection 3	
2020	Isabel Huntington	Western Bulldogs	2017 AFL Women's draft, selection 1	
2021	Tyla Hanks	Melbourne	2018 AFL Women's draft, selection 6	
2022 (S6)	Mimi Hill	Carlton	2020 AFL Women's draft, selection 12	
2022 (S7)	Hannah Ewings	Port Adelaide	2022 AFL Women's draft, selection 3	
2023	Zarlie Goldsworthy	Greater Western Sydney	2022 AFL Women's draft, selection 20	
2024	Matilda Scholz	Port Adelaide	2023 under-age signing	
2025	Zippy Fish	Sydney	2024 AFL Women's draft, selection 5	

== Nominations ==
=== Nominations by club ===
Updated to round 12, 2026.

Club	Nominations	Winners
Adelaide	13	1
Brisbane	12	0
Carlton	16	2
Collingwood	9	1
Essendon	5	0
Fremantle	7	0
Geelong	7	0
Gold Coast	11	0
Greater Western Sydney	11	1
Hawthorn	6	0
Melbourne	11	1
North Melbourne	4	0
Port Adelaide	8	2
Richmond	4	0
St Kilda	7	0
Sydney	7	1
West Coast	10	0
Western Bulldogs	18	1

=== Most nominations in a season ===
Number	Club	Season	Nominees
5	Western Bulldogs	2018	Libby Birch, Monique Conti, Naomi Ferres, Bonnie Toogood, Aisling Utri
4	Melbourne	2017	Deanna Berry, Jasmine Grierson, Lily Mithen, Katherine Smith
4	Brisbane	2021	Belle Dawes, Nat Grider, Tahlia Hickie, Courtney Hodder
4	Gold Coast	2026	Dekota Baron, Georja Davies, Ava Usher, Alannah Welsh
3	Adelaide	2018	Sarah Allan, Anne Hatchard, Eloise Jones
3	Carlton	2020	Grace Egan, Lucy McEvoy, Charlotte Wilson
3	St Kilda	2020	Caitlin Greiser, Georgia Patrikios, Olivia Vesely
3	Fremantle	2022 (S6)	Dana East, Mikayla Morrison, Sarah Verrier
3	Western Bulldogs	2022 (S6)	Elisabeth Georgostathis, Nell Morris-Dalton, Isabelle Pritchard
3	Port Adelaide	2022 (S7)	Abbey Dowrick, Hannah Ewings, Indy Tahau
3	Sydney	2022 (S7)	Montana Ham, Sofia Hurley, Cynthia Hamilton
3	Hawthorn	2023	Charlotte Baskaran, Jasmine Fleming, Lucy Wales
3	Sydney	2023	Ella Heads, Sofia Hurley, Ally Morphett
3	Port Adelaide	2024	Molly Brooksby, Shineah Goody, Matilda Scholz

== Achievements of winners ==
Won a premiership

- Ebony Marinoff (2017 Rising Star; 2017, 2019 and S6 premierships)
- Tyla Hanks (2021 Rising Star; S7 premiership)

Won the Rising Star and a premiership in the same season

- Ebony Marinoff (2017 Rising Star and premiership)

Won the AFL Women's best and fairest

- Ebony Marinoff (2017 Rising Star; 2024 best and fairest)
- Maddy Prespakis (2019 Rising Star; 2020 best and fairest)

== See also ==
- AFL Rising Star
