= 2022 AFL Women's season 6 Grand Final =

2022 Grand final game in the AFL Women's league

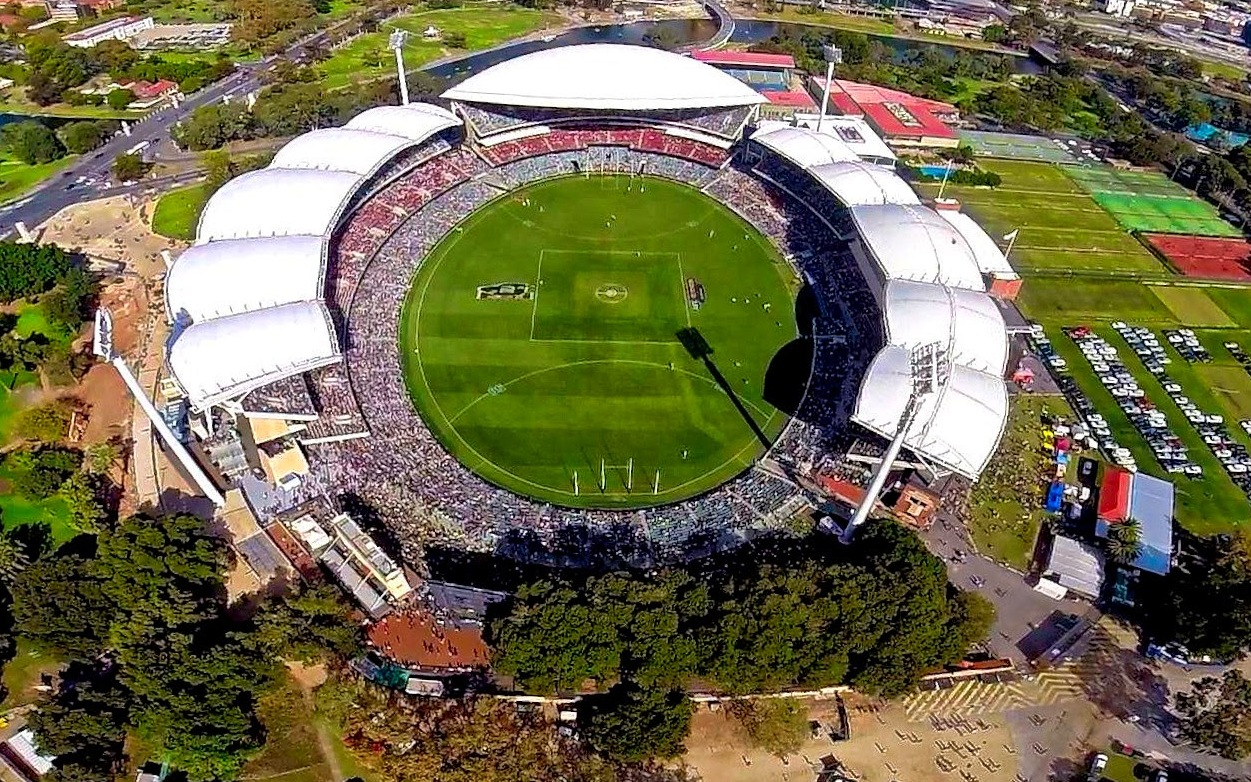
- Adelaide Oval, venue for the 2022 AFL Women's season 6 Grand Final, as seen in 2014

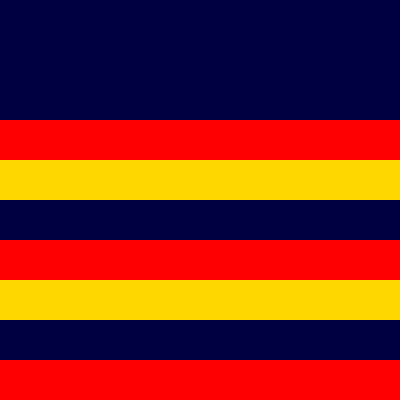

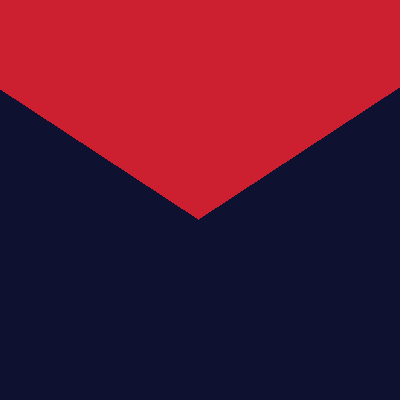
Adelaide	Melbourne
4.5 (29)	2.4 (16)
	1	2	3	4
ADE	1.1 (7)	2.5 (17)	3.5 (23)	4.5 (29)
MEL	0.0 (0)	1.1 (7)	2.2 (14)	2.4 (16)
- Date: 9 April 2022
- Stadium: Adelaide Oval
- Attendance: 16,712
- Umpires: Andrew Adair, Nicholas McGinness, Jordyn Pearson
- Coin toss won by: Adelaide
- Kicked toward: City end

Ceremonies
- National anthem: Chloe Bremner (supported by the Australian Girls Choir)

Broadcast in Australia
- Network: Seven Network
- Commentators: Jason Bennett, Jo Wotton, Abbey Holmes, Bec Goddard, Mel Hickey, Sam Lane

The 2022 AFL Women's season 6 Grand Final was an Australian rules football match held at the Adelaide Oval on 9 April to determine the premiers of the sixth season of the AFL Women's (AFLW) competition.

The match was contested by the Adelaide Football Club and the Melbourne Football Club. It was the first meeting between the two teams in a grand final; Adelaide had won two previous premierships and made their fourth grand final appearance, while Melbourne sought to claim an inaugural senior women's premiership at their first attempt. Adelaide won the match by 13 points, claiming their third premiership. Anne Hatchard of Adelaide was awarded the best on ground medal, with 26 possessions, nine marks and six tackles.

== Qualification ==
Adelaide, nicknamed as the Crows, finished the 10-game regular season in first position with nine wins and one loss, and the competition's highest percentage, 216.6%. Their only loss came in round six against the Western Bulldogs by 1 point at Norwood Oval, who finished outside the top six and did not qualify for the finals series. Their record earnt them their second minor premiership and a home preliminary final against Fremantle in the first weekend of April, who had defeated North Melbourne by 38 points in the first qualifying final. The Crows led all match and kept Fremantle at bay after taking a 7-point lead into quarter time. The season's leading goalkicker Ashleigh Woodland booted two goals to assist in the 14-point winners victory, which resulted in Adelaide qualifying for their third successive grand final. Adelaide had faced Melbourne in round four of the regular season, and came away with a 14-point victory at Norwood Oval.

Melbourne also lost only one match throughout the regular season and claimed nine wins. Their percentage of 186.5% saw them finish in second position and, like Adelaide, they had a bye in the first week of the finals and hosted the winner of the second qualifying final. This team was Brisbane, who defeated Collingwood by 50 points at the Gabba. Melbourne, who usually play home matches at the 9,000 capacity Casey Fields oval in Cranbourne, had their home preliminary final moved to the 100,000-seat Melbourne Cricket Ground, which was the first time the Australian Football League's largest venue had hosted an AFL Women's match. In overcast and slightly rainy conditions, the match started as a low-scoring contested contest, with both sides scoring one goal each to half time and Melbourne holding a one-point margin. The Demons made their charge in the third quarter, kicking three goals to one before fighting off a late comeback from Brisbane to claim a four-point victory and qualify for their maiden grand final. The attendance of 6,436 was described by Guardian Australia journalist Nicole Hayes as "meagre" but partially attributable to the AFL's decision to play the match at the venue at late notice.

The grand final had originally been scheduled for Saturday, 2 April, however a COVID-19 outbreak within the Collingwood playing group days prior to the qualifying final against Brisbane meant the league pushed back that match and all subsequent matches by one week.

== Venue ==
As Adelaide were the highest-placed team to qualify for the match, they were granted the home state advantage, and the AFL selected the 53,500 capacity Adelaide Oval, which had hosted grand finals in 2019 and 2021, as the venue for the match.

Tickets for the match were priced at $10 for general public adults, with free entry for children under 18 years of age and free tickets given to AFLW club members and several community football and talent pathway participants. Match day weather was hot, fine and sunny. The game commenced at 12:00 pm Australian Central Standard Time. An AFL match between Sydney and North Melbourne was pushed back by over an hour to accommodate the league's desire for the grand final to be played without clashing with men's fixtures.

== Broadcast and entertainment ==
The match was broadcast by the Seven Network and simulcast on Foxtel, Kayo, the afl.com.au and women's.afl websites, and on the AFL and AFLW apps. It was also available on radio nationally via ABC Radio, Triple M and SEN.

Pop artist and former Australian Idol contestant Jessica Mauboy performed for half-time entertainment, which was sponsored by Telstra. The match itself was sponsored by the National Australia Bank. Chloe Bremner sang the national anthem, supported by the Australian Girls Choir.

The grand final sprint, a tradition in the men's match since 1979 and first held for the women in 2021, was staged along the 50 metre arc. Fourteen players, one from each club, were split into two heats, with the final held at quarter time. The race was won by Alana Porter of Collingwood.

== Teams ==
The two teams were announced on 8 April 2022. Adelaide made three changes for the match, with part-time defender Madison Newman and midfield utility Brooke Tonon dropped from the side that had won the preliminary final. Ruck Montana McKinnon was handed a one-match suspension by the AFL Tribunal for a late and high bump on Kiara Bowers of Fremantle in the team's preliminary final win. Eloise Jones and Najwa Allen returned to the side having served their own suspensions, while Jasmyn Hewett was brought in to cover for McKinnon. Melbourne's line-up was unchanged.

The three field umpires for the match were Andrew Adair, Nicholas McGinness and Jordyn Pearson. This was McGinness' third grand final and Adair's second, while Peterson made her grand final debut and became the league's second female field umpire to officiate a grand final. Boundary umpires were Ty Duncan, Simon Blight, Patrick Jackson and Luke Graves and goal umpires were Matthew Edwards and James Rizio.

Adelaide
B:	12 Chelsea Biddell	32 Marijana Rajcic	
HB:	26 Chelsea Randall (c)	39 Sarah Allan	8 Najwa Allen
C:	14 Stevie-Lee Thompson	33 Anne Hatchard	16 Ailish Considine
HF:	15 Danielle Ponter	24 Ashleigh Woodland	2 Eloise Jones
F:	13 Erin Phillips	5 Rachelle Martin	
Foll:	1 Caitlin Gould	10 Ebony Marinoff	25 Teah Charlton
Int:	6 Hannah Button	20 Hannah Munyard	19 Jasmyn Hewett
Int:	23 Justine Mules	7 Nikki Gore	
Coach:	Matthew Clarke		

Melbourne
B:	9 Libby Birch	32 Gabrielle Colvin	
HB:	23 Sinéad Goldrick	8 Sarah Lampard	30 Shelley Heath
C:	4 Karen Paxman	5 Tyla Hanks	14 Lily Mithen
HF:	16 Alyssa Bannan	10 Kate Hore	12 Shelley Scott
F:	6 Daisy Pearce (c)	7 Tayla Harris	
Foll:	15 Lauren Pearce	2 Olivia Purcell	3 Maddi Gay
Int:	18 Casey Sherriff	11 Eliza West	29 Eden Zanker
Int:	22 Eliza McNamara	24 Megan Fitzsimon	
Coach:	Mick Stinear		

== Match summary ==
The match commenced with Adelaide's key midfielders Erin Phillips, Anne Hatchard and Ebony Marinoff starting in the centre square. Melbourne midfield included Karen Paxman and Lily Mithen, with Lauren Pearce in the ruck. Adelaide's Marijana Rajcic tagged Melbourne star Daisy Pearce, while Melbourne's Tyla Hanks tagged Erin Phillips. Adelaide captain Chelsea Randall and defender Sarah Allan shared the task of keeping Melbourne's full forward Tayla Harris quiet. Harris became the first woman to play in three grand finals playing for three different teams; all of them against Adelaide.

Adelaide had a good defensive zone set up, denying Melbourne its usual tactic of attacking down the middle, and most of the action in the first quarter was in Adelaide's forward half. The first score of the match was a rushed behind, thanks to Melbourne's Gabrielle Colvin, who saved an otherwise certain Adelaide goal. A few minutes later, Adelaide star forward Ashleigh Woodland was unable to score, fumbling the ball in the goal square. Adelaide's Danielle Ponter then attempted a tough shot from the left forward pocket, which missed but was marked on the line by late inclusion ruck Jasmyn Hewett, who went on to score Adelaide's first goal.

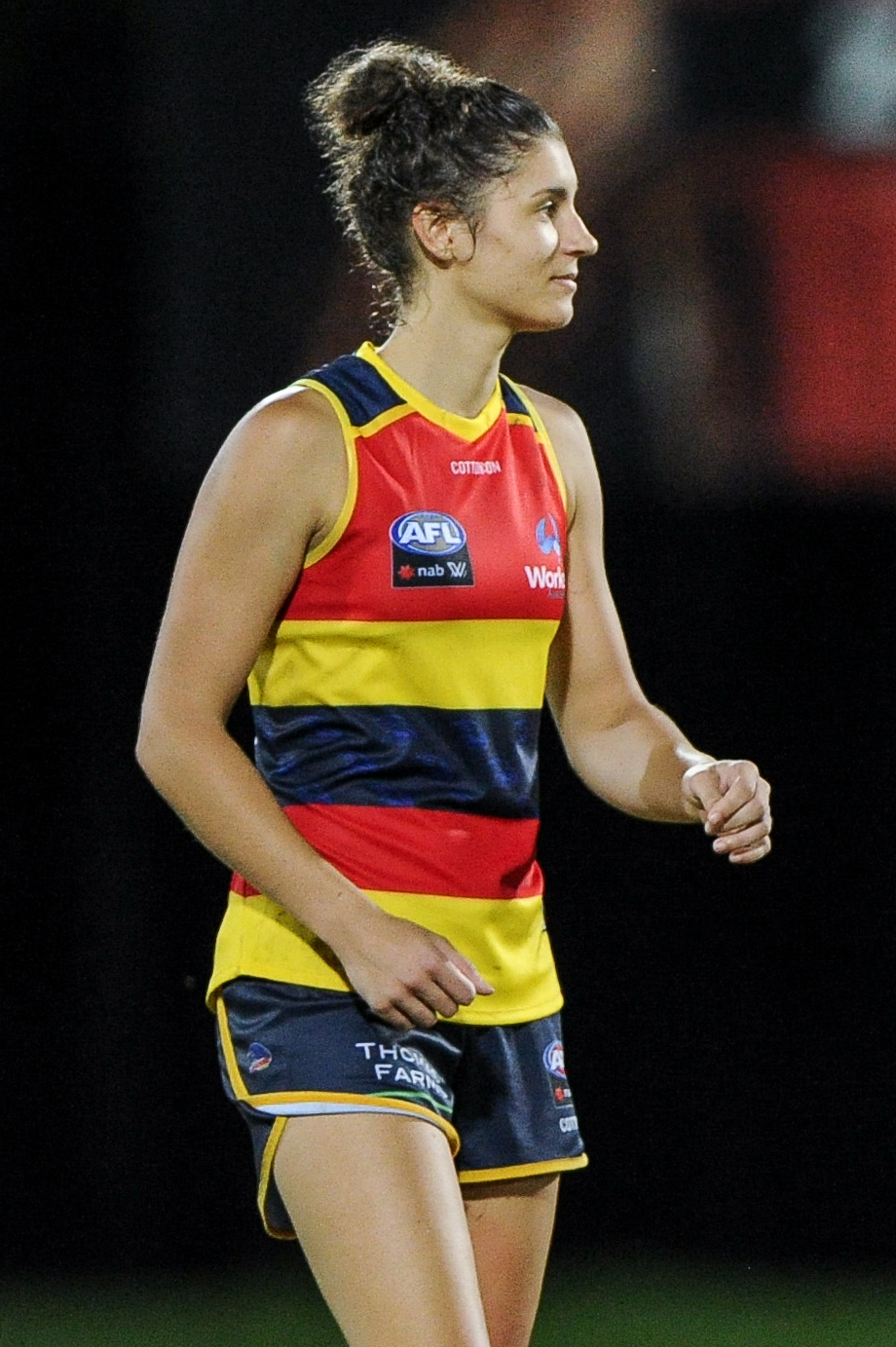
Late inclusion Jasmyn Hewett kicked the first goal of the match

In the second quarter, Melbourne suffered the first injury of the day when Maddi Gay limped from the ground. She returned later in the quarter with her knee taped. Adelaide continued its attacks, but Melbourne's defensive pressure, and Adelaide's inaccurate kicking, resulted in four more behinds. A second goal for Adelaide came from a snap kick from Phillips. It was her 50th goal in the AFLW. Nonetheless, after a rushed behind to Melbourne, Adelaide was only ten points up, and a goal from Alyssa Bannan, who intercepted the ball from a kick out and raced towards an open goal gave the Demons hope.

The third quarter opened with Ponter taking a strong mark in the goal square off a long-range kick from Woodland, from which she then scored a goal. The Demons ratcheted up the pressure, and finally started to use the centre corridor. Pearce reinforced the back line, and Tayla Harris was moved into the ruck. Melbourne's Kate Hore kicked a goal after marking a long-range shot from Harris. The Adelaide defence stood firm, with Randall taking a spectacular mark. Hatchard was dominant in the midfield, and her teammates Ebony Marinoff, Teah Charlton and Rachelle Martin were active. After scoring another behind, Melbourne was nine points down at three quarter time in a match in which Adelaide had been dominant all afternoon.

Early in the final quarter, Melbourne's Casey Sherriff went off the ground with a suspected broken arm using her guernsey as a makeshift sling. With eleven minutes to go, Melbourne's Sarah Lampard took a snap at goal from 35 metres out, but missed, cutting Adelaide's lead to eight points. A pivotal moment then occurred from a Chelsea Biddell kick in from defence. Hatchard and Eloise Jones won the ball, and Jones took off, kicking it to Charlton who was forward of the centre square. Charlton kicked the ball to Ponter, who went to the ground with defender Gabrielle Colvin. Ponter immediately got back on her feet, ran forwards and kicked a goal. This was Ponter's tenth goal in a final, more than any other AFLW player, and fifth from the three grand finals she has played.

The final siren sounded, with Adelaide winning by thirteen points. Seven Adelaide players had won three premierships, in 2017, 2019 and 2022: Sarah Allan, Anne Hatchard, Ebony Marinoff, Justine Mules, Erin Phillips, Chelsea Randall and Stevie-Lee Thompson.

== Best on Ground medal ==
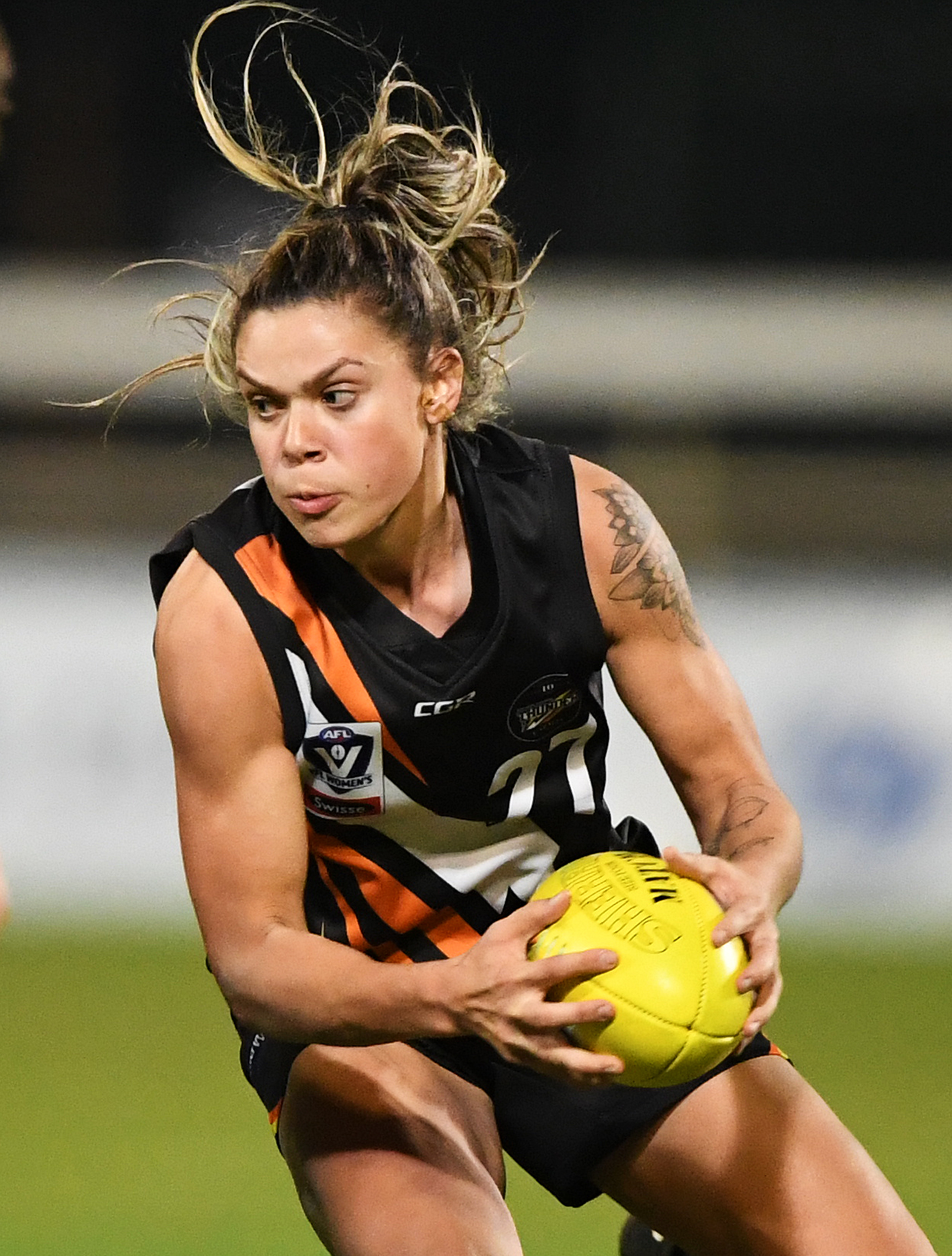
Anne Hatchard (pictured in 2019) was voted best on ground

Adelaide midfielder Anne Hatchard was awarded the medal for the best player on the ground. She finished with 25 disposals, nine marks, six tackles, five clearances and 568 metres gained.

Best on Ground Medal Voting Tally
Position	Player	Club	Total votes	Vote summary
1st (winner)	Anne Hatchard	Adelaide Crows	14	3, 3, 3, 3, 2
2nd	Ebony Marinoff	Adelaide Crows	6	2, 2, 2
3rd	Danielle Ponter	Adelaide Crows	5	3, 1, 1
4th	Sinéad Goldrick	Melbourne	2	2
5th - tied	Gabrielle Colvin	Melbourne	1	1
5th - tied	Karen Paxman	Melbourne	1	1
5th - tied	Chelsea Randall	Adelaide Crows	1	1

Voter	3 Votes	2 Votes	1 Vote
Laura Kane (chair)	Anne Hatchard	Ebony Marinoff	Danielle Ponter
Lauren Wood (Herald Sun)	Danielle Ponter	Anne Hatchard	Chelsea Randall
Bec Goddard (Seven Network)	Anne Hatchard	Ebony Marinoff	Karen Paxman
Jessica Webster (ABC)	Anne Hatchard	Sinéad Goldrick	Danielle Ponter
Gemma Bastiani (AFLW Media)	Anne Hatchard	Ebony Marinoff	Gabrielle Colvin

== Scorecard ==
2022 AFL Women's season 6 Grand Final
Saturday, 9 April (12:00 p.m.)	Adelaide	def.	Melbourne	Adelaide Oval (crowd: 16,712)
1.1 (7); 2.5 (17); 3.5 (23); 4.5 (29)	Q1; Q2; Q3; Final	0.0 (0); 1.1 (7); 2.2 (14); 2.4 (16)	Umpires: Adair, McGinness, Pearson; Best on ground: Anne Hatchard (Adelaide); Television broadcast: Seven Network; National anthem: Chloe Bremner (supported by the Australian Girls Choir)
2: Ponter; 1: Phillips, Hewett	Goals	1: Bannan, Hore
Hatchard, Marinoff, Ponter, Martin, Allan	Best	Paxman, Goldrick, Colvin, Hanks, Mithen
Charlton (head knock; returned to field), Allen (head knock; returned to field)	Injuries	Gay (knee; returned to field), Sherriff (wrist)

== See also ==
- AFL Women's Grand Final
- 2022 AFL Grand Final
