= 2022 AFL Women's Grand Final =

2022 AFL Women's Grand Final may refer to:

- 2022 AFL Women's season 6 Grand Final, for the season that took place from January to April
- 2022 AFL Women's season 7 Grand Final, for the season that took place from August to November
