= Amelia Mullane =

Australian rules footballer (born 1993)

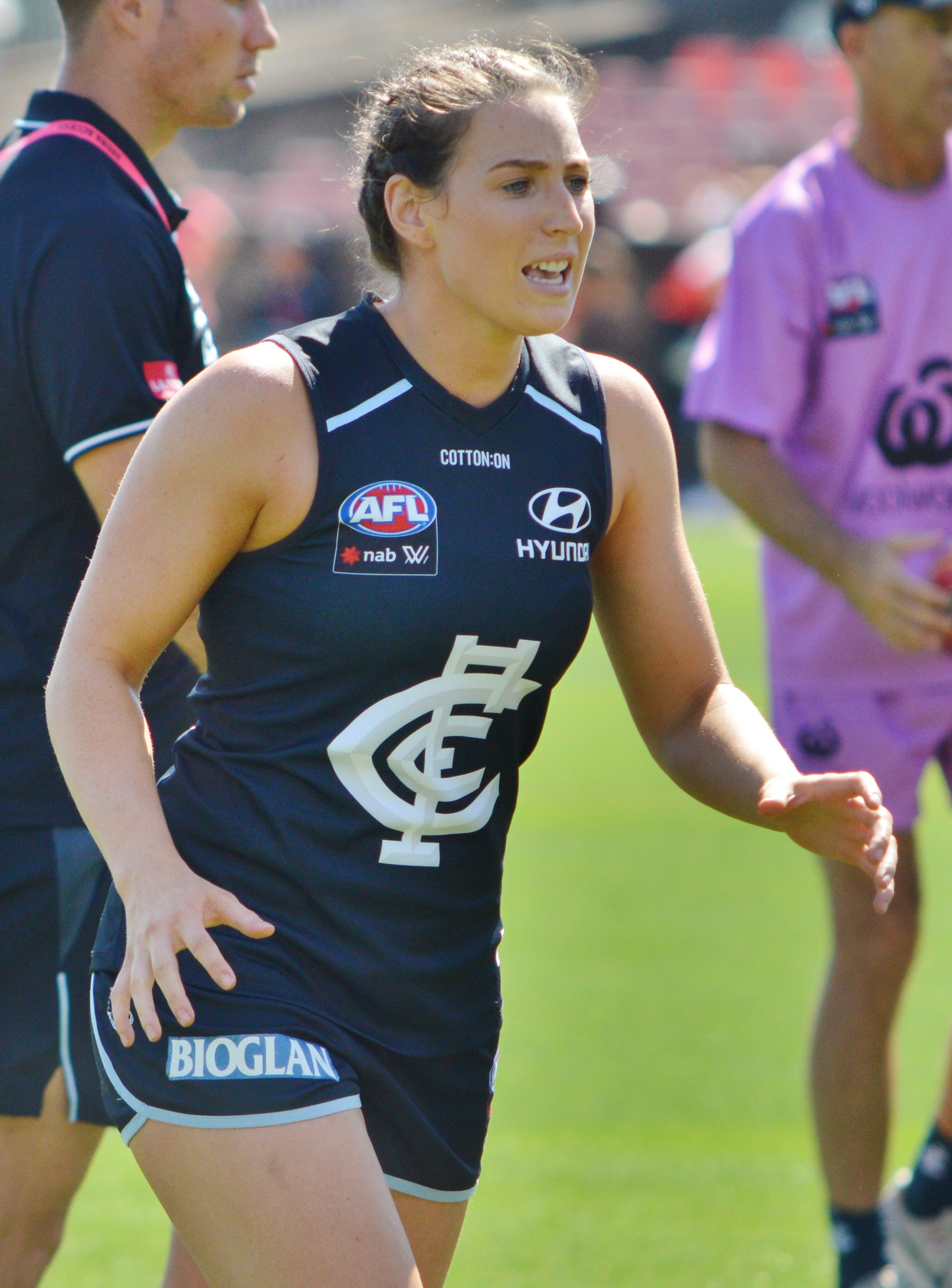
- Mullane with Carlton in March 2019

Personal information
- Full name: Amelia Mullane
- Born: 17 April 1993 (age 33)
- Original team: Diamond Creek (VFLW)
- Draft: No. 59, 2016 national draft
- Debut: Round 1, 2017, Collingwood vs. Carlton, at IKON Park
- Height: 167 cm (5 ft 6 in)
- Position: Midfielder

Playing career
Years	Club	Games (Goals)
2017–2018	Collingwood	14 (3)
2019	Carlton	9 (0)
Total		23 (3)

Amelia Mullane (née Barden; born 17 April 1993) is a retired Australian rules footballer who played for Collingwood and for Carlton in the AFL Women's (AFLW).

== Early life and state football ==
Mullane started playing football at her school Eltham College and in 2011 joined VFLW club Diamond Creek, where she played for five years. During that time she won the 2012 VFLW premiership with Diamond Creek, under the coaching of her father, and twice won the club's best and fairest award. Mullane attributes her strengths of blocking and tackling to her three brothers knocking her around when they were growing up.

During the off-season between the 2017 and 2018 AFLW seasons, Mullane played for Diamond Creek in the VFLW. She played in nine games leading up to the grand final, but they lost the premiership match to Darebin Falcons.

== AFL Women's career ==
=== Collingwood ===
Mullane made her debut for Collingwood in round 1, 2017, in the inaugural AFLW match at IKON Park against Carlton, in which she was one of Collingwood's best players. In the first two weeks of the competition she asserted herself as one of Collingwood's leading midfielders and was praised by commentators for her uncompromising attack on the ball.

Collingwood re-signed Mullane for the 2018 season during the trade period in May 2017.

=== Carlton ===
Ahead of the 2019 season, Mullane was traded to Carlton as part of a three-way deal in which Maddi Gay was traded from Carlton to Melbourne.

After playing all nine matches in the 2019 season, including in the grand final, Mullane announced that she is retiring from football.

== Personal life ==
Apart from her sports career, Mullane works as a full-time nurse at an orthopaedic ward and at an IVF clinic.

== Statistics ==
Statistics are correct to the end of the 2019 season.

Legend
G	Goals	K	Kicks	D	Disposals	T	Tackles
B	Behinds	H	Handballs	M	Marks

Season	Team	No.	Games	Totals							Averages (per game)						
Season	Team	No.	Games	G	B	K	H	D	M	T	G	B	K	H	D	M	T
2017	Collingwood	38	7	0	1	36	29	65	8	39	0.0	0.1	5.1	4.1	9.3	1.1	5.6
2018	Collingwood	38	7	3	4	39	34	73	7	47	0.4	0.6	5.6	4.9	10.4	1.0	6.7
2019	Carlton	8	9	0	0	40	37	77	7	47	0.0	0.0	4.4	4.1	8.6	0.8	5.2
Career			23	3	5	115	100	215	22	133	0.1	0.2	5.0	4.3	9.3	1.0	5.8
