= Teah Charlton =

Australian rules footballer (born 2002)

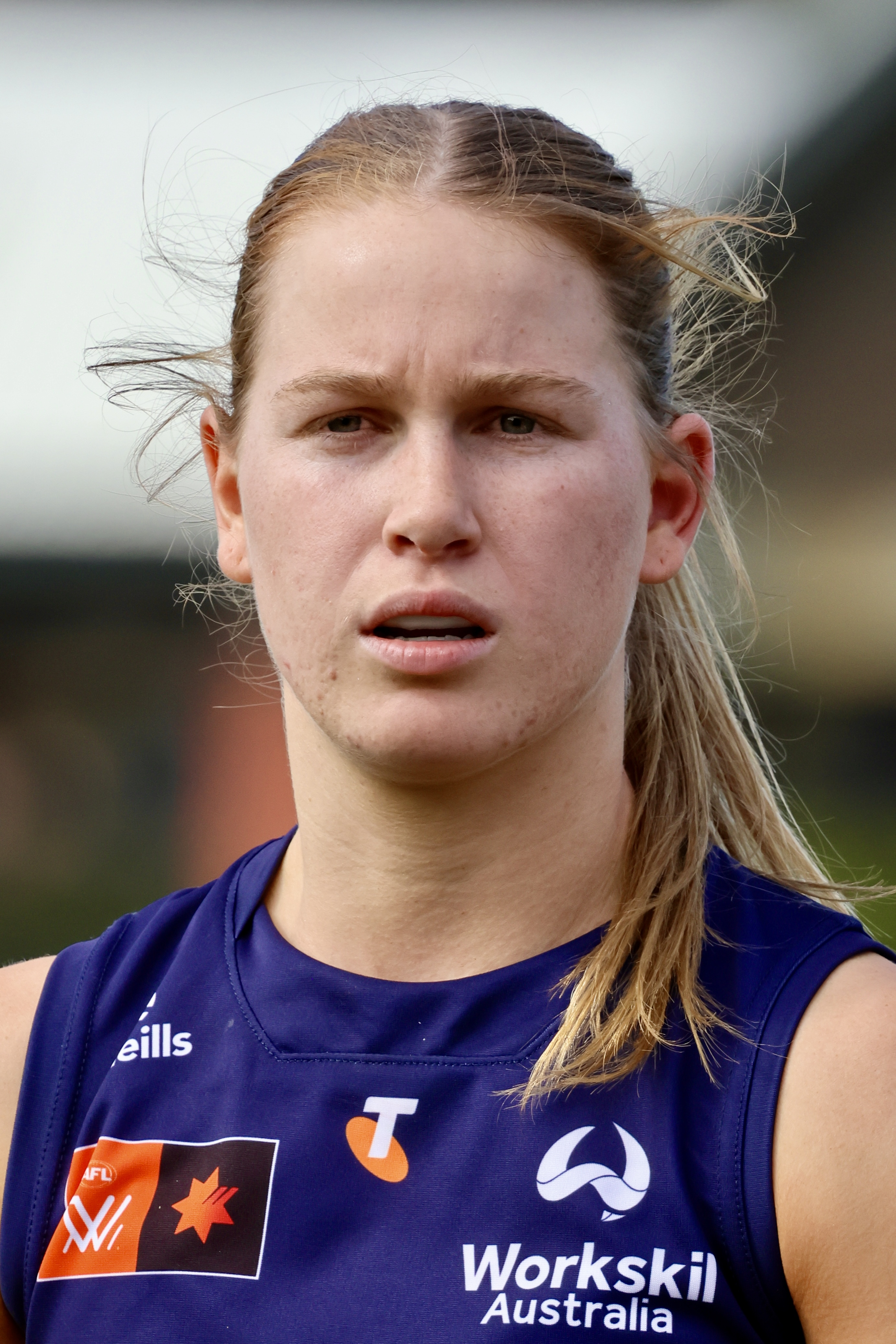
- Charlton with Adelaide in 2026

Personal information
- Born: 25 April 2002 (age 24)
- Original team: South Adelaide (SANFLW)
- Draft: No. 4, 2020 national draft
- Debut: Round 1, 2021, Adelaide vs. West Coast, at Lathlain Park
- Height: 170 cm (5 ft 7 in)
- Position: Midfielder / Forward

Club information
- Current club: Adelaide
- Number: 25

Playing career^{1}
Years	Club	Games (Goals)
2021–	Adelaide	70 (15)
- ^{1} Playing statistics correct to the end of elimination final, 2025.

Career highlights
- AFL Women's premiership player: 2022 (S6); 2× 22under22 team: 2023, 2024

Teah Charlton (born 25 April 2002) is an Australian rules footballer playing for Adelaide in the AFL Women's (AFLW). She was drafted with the fourth selection in the 2020 AFL Women's draft by the Adelaide.

== Early football ==
Charlton played local football for the Christies Beach Football Club, and represented South Australia at the School Sport Australia Australian Football championships, where she was named an All-Australian at age 15. After competing in surf lifesaving up until the age of 15, 2019 saw her begin to compete for the South Adelaide Football Club in the SANFLW. She quickly became one of the best young players, winning the Breakthrough Player Award after being nominated in Round 3 of that season for a 1-goal, 19 disposal performance against West Adelaide. She also finished in the Top 10 of the Goalkicking, lead the lead for tackles with a total of 77, and also played in the team's grand final victory in 2019, where she collected 18 disposals and 5 tackles. She averaged 15.8 disposals per game and kicked 8 goals through the home and away season, and 3 during the finals. 2020 saw her season cut short by the COVID-19 pandemic, playing just 4 games. She averaged 19.1 disposals and 5.3 tackles per game, finishing equal seventh in the league's best and fairest voting.

== AFLW career ==
Charlton debuted in the opening round of the 2021 AFL Women's season, in the Adelaide's 38 point win over West Coast. On debut, she collected 8 disposals, 1 behind, 2 marks and 7 tackles. She tallied a career high 14 disposals against Fremantle in Round 3, and kicked 2 goals against St Kilda, one of them receiving a Goal of the Year nomination.

== Statistics ==
Statistics are correct to the end of the 2025 season.

Legend
G	Goals	K	Kicks	D	Disposals	T	Tackles
B	Behinds	H	Handballs	M	Marks
#	Played in that season's premiership team

Season	Team	No.	Games	Totals							Averages (per game)							Votes
Season	Team	No.	Games	G	B	K	H	D	M	T	G	B	K	H	D	M	T	Votes
2021	Adelaide	25	11	3	2	48	53	101	12	35	0.3	0.2	4.4	4.8	9.2	1.1	3.2	0
2022 (S6)^{#}	Adelaide	25	11	0	2	69	60	129	21	52	0.0	0.2	6.3	5.5	11.7	1.9	4.7	0
2022 (S7)	Adelaide	25	13	1	3	84	86	170	10	65	0.1	0.2	6.5	6.6	13.1	0.8	5.0	0
2023	Adelaide	25	13	4	2	100	85	185	17	97	0.3	0.2	7.7	6.5	14.2	1.3	7.5	2
2024	Adelaide	25	11	3	3	44	73	117	16	30	0.3	0.3	4.0	6.6	10.6	1.5	2.7	0
2025	Adelaide	25	12	5	3	60	91	151	15	63	0.4	0.3	5.0	7.6	12.6	1.3	5.3	0
Career			71	16	15	405	448	853	91	342	0.2	0.2	5.7	6.3	12.0	1.3	4.8	2

== Personal life ==
Charlton cited her favourite footballer as Rory Sloane.
