= 2019 AFL Women's Grand Final =

Grand final game in the AFL Women's league

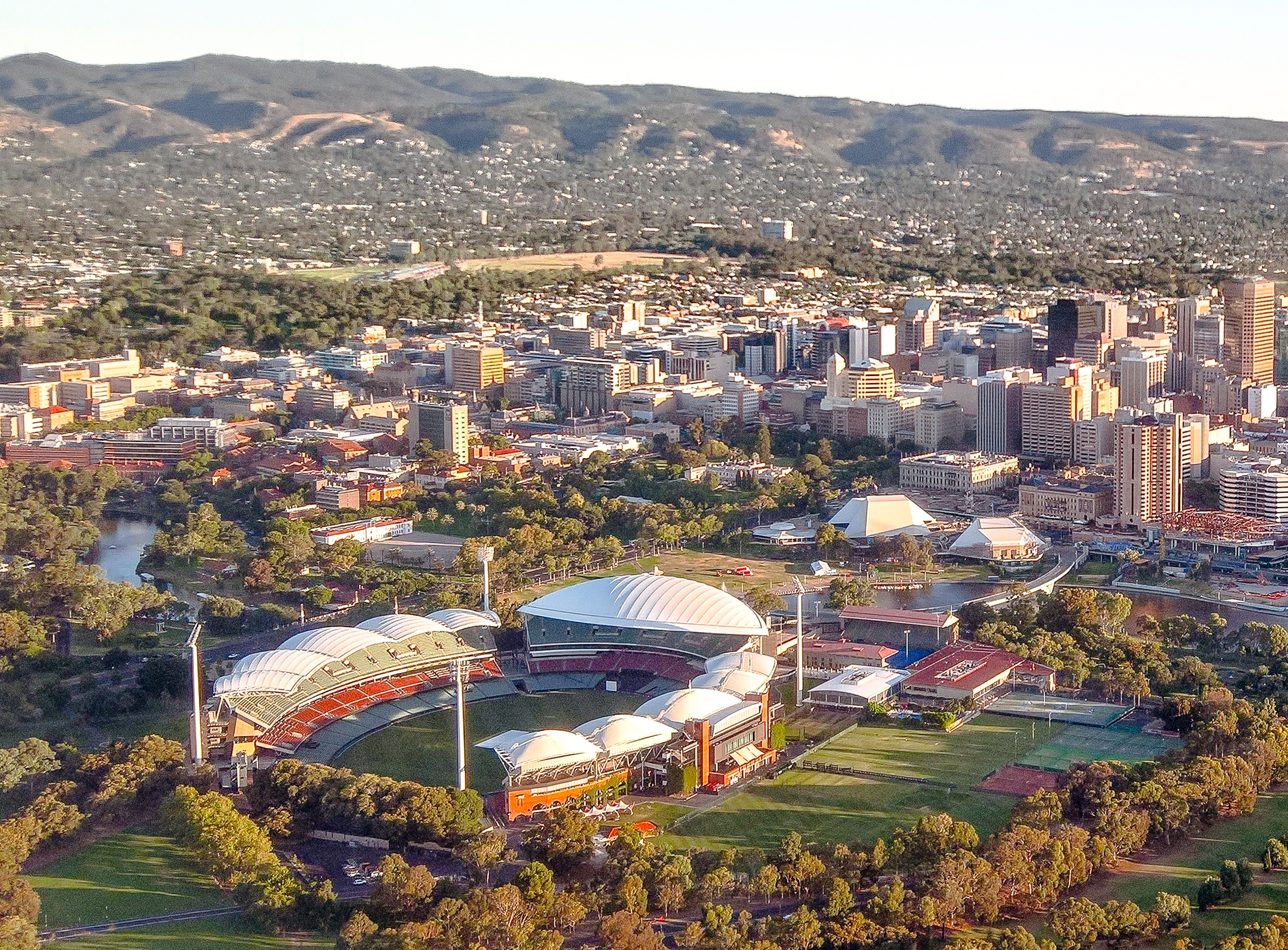
- Adelaide Oval, venue for the 2019 AFL Women's Grand Final, as seen in 2015

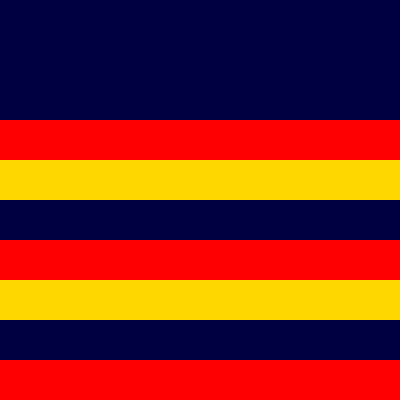

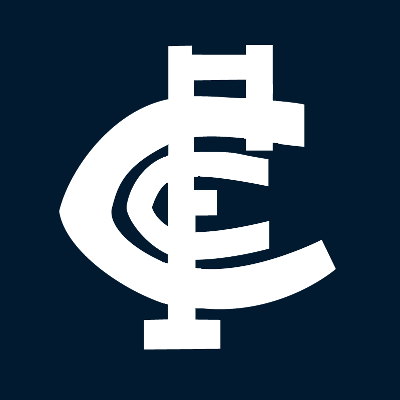
Adelaide	Carlton
10.3 (63)	2.6 (18)
	1	2	3	4
ADE	3.0 (18)	9.2 (56)	10.2 (62)	10.3 (63)
CAR	1.3 (9)	2.4 (16)	2.5 (17)	2.6 (18)
- Date: 31 March 2019
- Stadium: Adelaide Oval
- Attendance: 53,034

Broadcast in Australia
- Network: Seven Network
- Commentators: Jason Bennett, Mark Soderstrom, Abbey Holmes, Sam Lane

The 2019 AFL Women's Grand Final was an Australian rules football match held at Adelaide Oval on 31 March 2019 to determine the premiers of the league's third season. Admission was free to the general public, and the match between Adelaide and Carlton was contested before a crowd of 53,034 – which at that time was the record for a stand-alone women's sporting event in Australia. It was won by Adelaide, 10.3 (63) to 2.6 (18), and Adelaide claimed its second premiership in three years. Its co-captain Erin Phillips was voted best on ground, despite suffering an anterior cruciate ligament (ACL) injury in the third quarter.

== Background ==
Two new teams, Geelong and North Melbourne, joined the AFL Women's (AFLW) competition in 2019, bringing the total number of teams to ten. The league retained a seven-round home-and-away season. This was achieved by splitting the competition into two conferences, with one of the new teams in each. Each team played four games against their fellow conference members and three "cross-over" matches against teams from the other conference. Conference membership was based on the final ladder positions of the 2018 season. As it turned out, the competition was unbalanced, with Conference A teams winning 14 of the 16 cross-over matches. The finals series was expanded to include preliminary finals for the first time. The two teams that finished the highest in each conference at the end of the home-and-away season qualified for the preliminary finals, with the team that finished highest in Conference A playing the team that finished second in Conference B and vice versa. The winners of these matches then played in the AFL Women's Grand Final.

After winning the 2017 AFL Women's Grand Final, the Adelaide Crows finished a disappointing fifth in 2018. The Carlton Blues, which were also expected to perform well in 2018, did much worse, ultimately battling Fremantle for the wooden spoon – and getting it. In 2019, both Adelaide and Carlton had new coaches – Matthew Clarke and Daniel Harford respectively. The Crows retained much of their team from 2017 and 2018, but lacked a ruckman after Rhiannon Metcalfe was sidelined for an ACL reconstruction and Jasmyn Hewett suffered an ankle injury. Former Opals basketball player Jess Foley was pressed into the ruck role at the last minute. The Crows went on to an impressive season, notching up seven games by an average of 40 points, and finishing on top of Conference A. Their only loss for the season was by a single point in the first round match against the Western Bulldogs, when they kicked an inaccurate 1.11. Carlton got off to a slow start, losing to North Melbourne in round one and then Adelaide in round two, before winning five of the last six games to finish on top of Conference B.

In their preliminary final, the Crows conducted a 66-point demolition of Geelong before a home crowd of 13,429 at the Adelaide Oval, not allowing the visitors to score until late in the final quarter. In an answer to critics of the women's game that complained about it being low scoring, the Crows outscored nine of the men's teams that weekend (including their own men's team, as well as reigning premiers West Coast), despite the fact that AFLW only plays 15-minute quarters (instead of 20), and has less time on. The conference system ensured that Carlton, which finished at the top of Conference B, also hosted the preliminary finals. This was seen as disadvantaging Fremantle, which had won two more games than Carlton, and had a far better percentage (141.2 per cent compared with 99.6 per cent).

In the lead up to the preliminary final, an image of Carlton's star forward Tayla Harris demonstrating her on-field athleticism that was posted online by the Seven Network came under attack by misogynist internet trolls. Rather than suppressing their comments, Seven took the image down, resulting in a chorus of outrage. In the preliminary final, Harris went on to demonstrate her kicking style, slotting Carlton's first goal from 45 metres out. The Blues went on to win by 36 points, setting up a grand final clash with Adelaide.

== Venue ==
As the highest-ranked team across the two conferences, Adelaide won the right to host the grand final. The match was scheduled for Sunday, 31 March 2019 at Adelaide Oval, which AFLW Chief Executive Nicole Livingstone conceding this timeslot would clash with a men's game between North Melbourne and the Brisbane Lions. The AFLW considered a Saturday game, but getting the ground ready for a Port Adelaide game later that afternoon meant that the Grand Final would have to start at 10:30 am (Adelaide time) to have the signage and advertising changed for the men's game, a proposition that was rejected outright by the clubs and Adelaide Oval management.

Admission was free to the general public, and the AFL hoped for a crowd of around 25,000. In the event, the crowd of 53,034 was the largest ever for an AFLW match, the fifth highest ever at Adelaide Oval, and a record for a stand-alone women's sporting event in Australia, surpassing a record set in 1920. Extra seating was hurriedly opened in the upper grandstands. The unanticipated large crowd put the city's public transport under strain. Its record as the highest women's sports crowd in Australian history was surpassed in March 2020 by the 2020 ICC Women's T20 World Cup Final, but as of 2020 retains the record for highest crowd at a women's football match.

== Teams ==
Teams were announced on 29 March 2019. Both clubs had unchanged lineups from the preliminary finals the week before:

Adelaide
B:	31 Dayna Cox	39 Sarah Allan	23 Justine Mules
HB:	32 Marijana Rajcic	26 Chelsea Randall(c)	3 Ange Foley
C:		13 Erin Phillips(c)	
HF:	15 Danielle Ponter	4 Chloe Scheer	22 Courtney Cramey
F:	2 Eloise Jones	14 Stevie-Lee Thompson	9 Deni Varnhagen
Foll:	24 Jessica Foley	33 Anne Hatchard	10 Ebony Marinoff
Int:	6 Hannah Martin	27 Renee Forth	19 Sophie Li
Int:	16 Ailish Considine	5 Jenna McCormick	
Coach:	Matthew Clarke		

Carlton
B:	36 Jayde Van Dyk	9 Kerryn Harrington	21 Nicola Stevens
HB:	15 Chloe Dalton	20 Charlotte Wilson	6 Gab Pound
C:		1 Brianna Davey(c)	
HF:	12 Lauren Brazzale	16 Breann Moody	18 Tilly Lucas-Rodd
F:	3 Darcy Vescio	7 Tayla Harris	14 Brooke Walker
Foll:	30 Alison Downie	4 Maddy Prespakis	10 Sarah Hosking
Int:	19 Georgia Gee	25 Jess Edwards	11 Jess Hosking
Int:	8 Amelia Mullane	2 Katie Loynes	
Coach:	Daniel Harford		

== Match summary ==
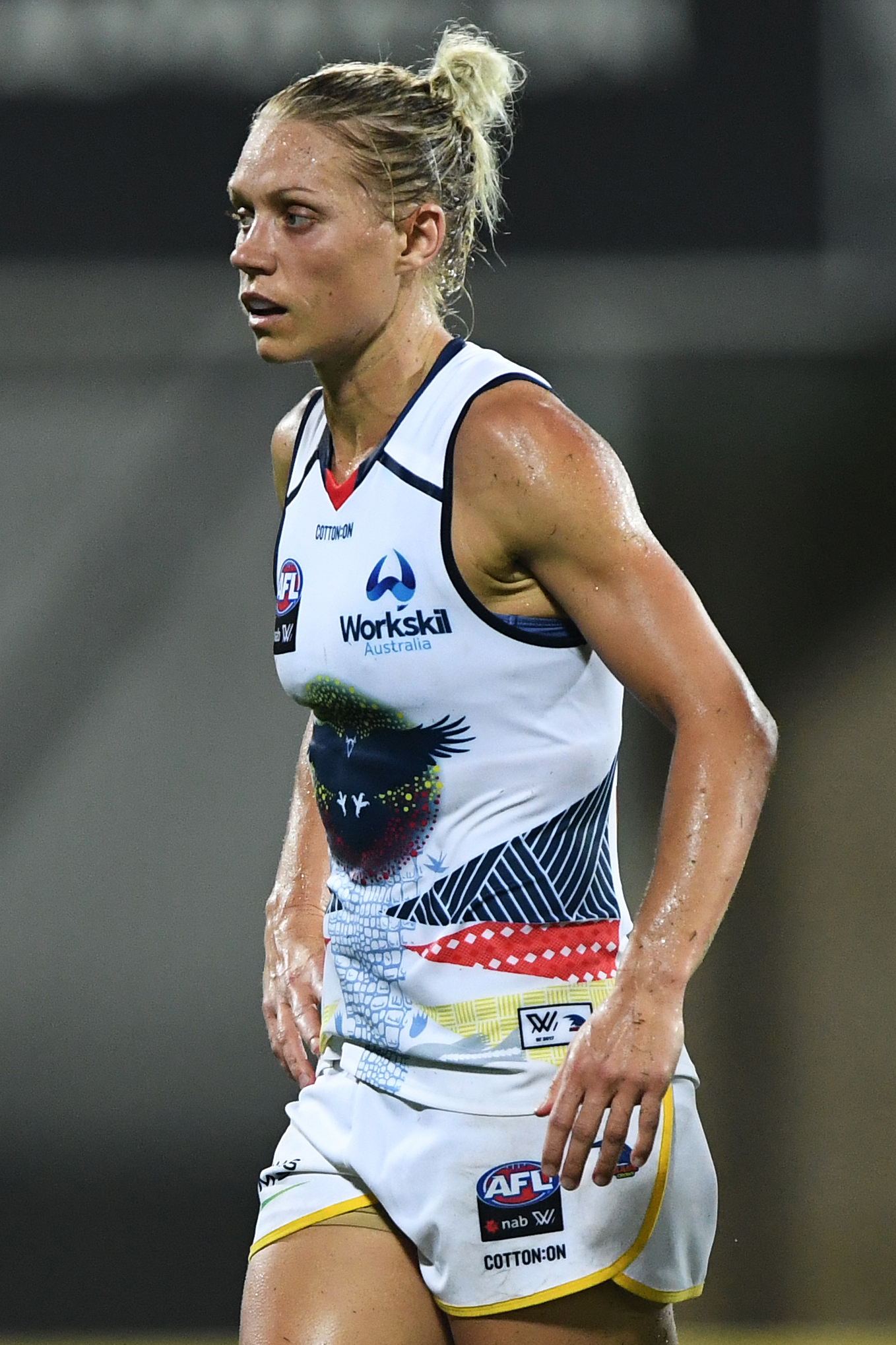
Adelaide co-captain Erin Phillips was named best on ground.

The Blues started well, with Maddy Prespakis scoring an early first goal off a 50-metre penalty on Adelaide co-captain Erin Phillips. The Crows were quick to respond with quick ball movement in the centre square from Foley to Ebony Marinoff to Anne Hatchard, who notched up their first score. A second 50-metre penalty gave Carlton another chance but was rushed through by Adelaide for a behind by Sarah Allan. The Crows were soon back on the attack, with Phillips marking just inside the 50-metre arc. Her kick fell short, but Irish recruit Ailish Considine put it through for a second goal. A third soon followed with Eloise Jones passing the ball to Hannah Martin for a goal from point-blank range. An attempt at the other end by Sarah Hosking resulted only in a behind, and yet another 50-metre penalty gave the Blues an opportunity on the siren, but the ball fell well short of the goal line.

At quarter time, Carlton felt they were dominating everywhere but on the scoreboard, but this feeling would soon pass. The second quarter opened with an Adelaide goal. An overhead mark in the centre by Jones was handed off to Phillips, who booted it forward to the advantage of Stevie-Lee Thompson, who marked it and sprinted towards the goal line. Thompson proved too fast for the Carlton defenders, who were caught too far out from goal, and a goal resulted. A couple of minutes later, Phillips earned a free kick from a high tackle by Sarah Hosking. One accurate kick later, and Phillips had ten goals for the season, and Adelaide, five for the match. A mark by Renee Forth off a delivery from Deni Varnhagen nearly made it six, but she missed, scoring only a behind.

The next opportunity came a few minutes later. A Carlton turnover saw Allan boot the ball forward to Chloe Scheer, who took a specky over the top of Blues defender Kerryn Harrington. She played on and delivered it to Danielle Ponter for an easy first goal. Soon after though, Scheer went down with a suspected anterior cruciate ligament injury, and was out of the game. It did not halt Adelaide, as Ponter marked a delivery from Jones inside the goal square for her second. A third followed, bringing her to twelve for the season. Tayla Harris attempted to score one against the flow of play, but it was touched on the line by Allan. It fell to Carlton captain Bri Davey to put the Blues' second goal on the scoreboard. Jones had a free kick at goal after the siren that sailed through, and Adelaide took a forty-point lead into the half time break.

When play resumed after the long break, Harris started in the ruck, possibly in an attempt to get her into the game. This backfired, as she immediately collided with Davey, and went off clutching her knee. Thompson also hobbled off the ground, with an ankle injury. Both would return, but not for some time. Phillips marked a pass from Forth 40 metres out, and had her second goal of the match. Soon after, Phillips went down, clutching her knee, and had to be stretchered off the ground. The crowd gave her a standing ovation, and even the Carlton players looked upset. In the final quarter, the players had less to show for their efforts. Foley missed a shot from 35 metres out, scoring only a behind, as did Chloe Dalton at the other end. Hosking was awarded a free kick after being crunched in a tackle by Foley, but missed everything. A final effort by the Crows could not score before the final siren sounded.

=== Best on Ground Medal ===
Phillips's injury cast a pall over the Crows' win. "It's an ACL," she confirmed, "something I have done before in my other leg. This was supposed to be the good leg." Despite only playing for three-quarters, Phillips, who had 18 disposals and two goals, was named best on ground, as she had been when Adelaide previously won the flag in 2017. The following night she won the AFLW Players' Association's Most Valuable Player award, which she had also previously won in 2017. On 2 April, she was awarded the AFLW best and fairest award for second time, having previously won it in 2017, and was named the captain of the 2019 AFL Women's All-Australian team. Her Adelaide co-captain Chelsea Randall was named the vice captain, and Hatchard, Thompson and Marinoff were also part of the squad, as were Carlton's Prespakis, Harrington and Gab Pound.

Best on Ground Medal Voting Tally
Position	Player	Club	Total votes	Vote summary
1st (winner)	Erin Phillips	Adelaide Crows	11	3, 3, 2, 2, 1
2nd	Anne Hatchard	Adelaide Crows	10	3, 3, 2, 1, 1
3rd	Jessica Foley	Adelaide Crows	4	3, 1
4th	Chelsea Randall	Adelaide Crows	3	2, 1
5th	Brianna Davey	Carlton	2	2

Voter	3 Votes	2 Votes	1 Vote
Josh Vanderloo (chair)	Anne Hatchard	Erin Phillips	Chelsea Randall
Brett Munro	Erin Phillips	Brianna Davey	Anne Hatchard
Mark Soderstrom	Anne Hatchard	Erin Phillips	Jessica Foley
Liz Walsh	Jessica Foley	Anne Hatchard	Erin Phillips
Jo Wotton	Erin Phillips	Chelsea Randall	Anne Hatchard

== Scorecard ==
2019 AFL Women's Grand Final
Sunday, 31 March (12:30 p.m.)	Adelaide	def.	Carlton	Adelaide Oval (crowd: 53,034)	Report
3.0 (18); 9.2 (56); 10.2 (62); 10.3 (63)	Q1; Q2; Q3; Final	1.3 (9); 2.4 (16); 2.5 (17); 2.6 (18)	Umpires: Toner, Heffernan, McGinness; Best on ground: Erin Phillips; Television broadcast: Seven Network
Ponter 3, Phillips 2, Hatchard, Considine, Martin, Thompson, Jones	Goals	Prespakis, Davey
Hatchard, Phillips, Jones, Randall, Allan, Marinoff, J.Foley	Best	Davey, Stevens, Prespakis, S.Hosking, Downie
Scheer (knee), Phillips (knee)	Injuries	Nil
Nil	Reports	Nil

== Media coverage ==
The game was broadcast live on Channel Seven, Fox Footy, womens.afl and the AFLW Official App. ARIA Award winner Amy Shark performed songs from her debut album Love Monster. She said that the Tayla Harris photo incident made her more determined to perform, saying that "[J]ust being a female in music, I'll do anything I can to help highlight any other woman trying to make it in the professional world, no matter what that field is". The match was watched live by a television audience of 409,000.
