= Chloe Scheer =

Australian rules footballer

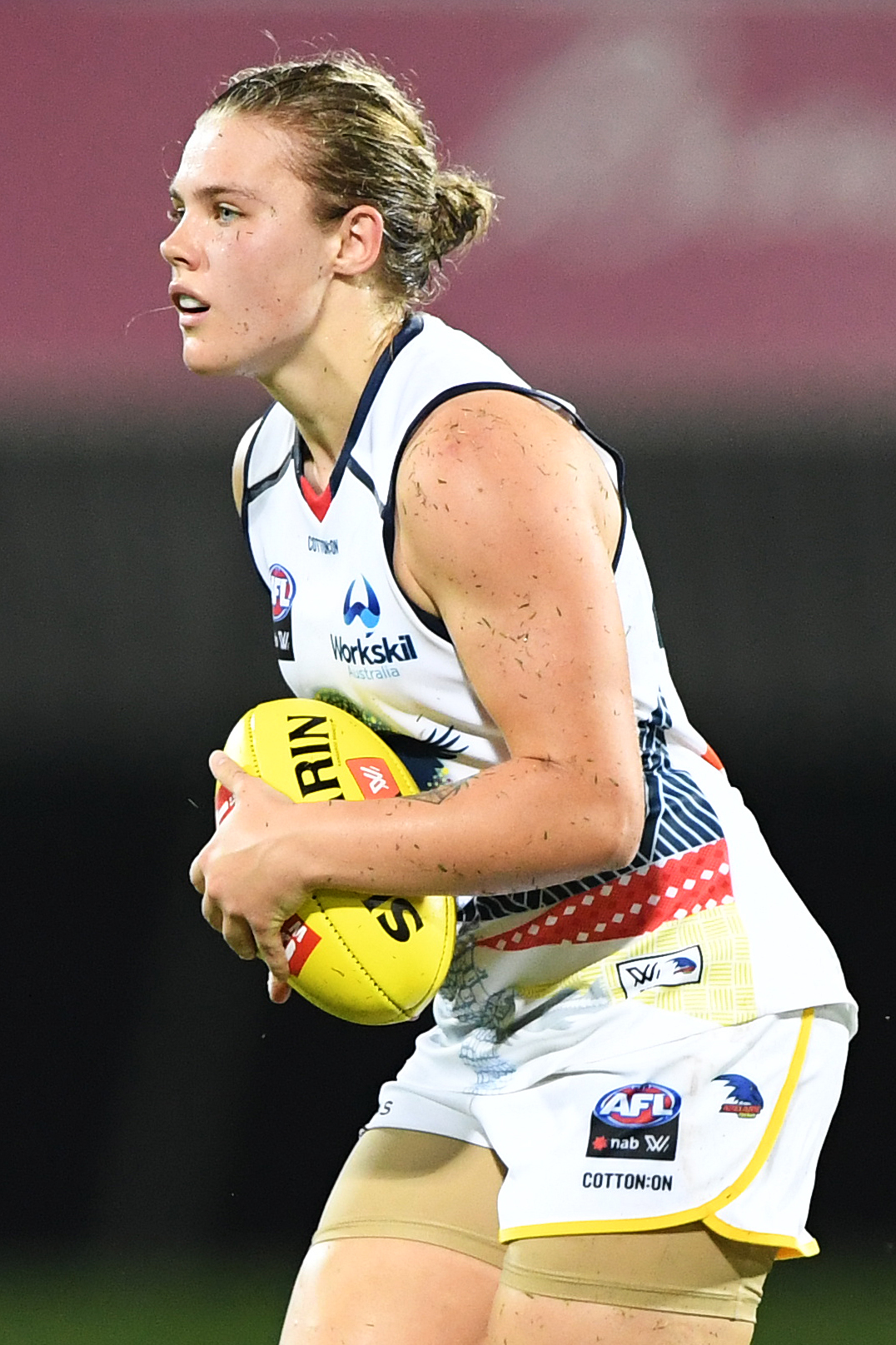
- Scheer playing for Adelaide in January 2019

Personal information
- Born: 7 October 1999 (age 27); Gawler, South Australia
- Original team: North Adelaide (SANFLW)
- Draft: No. 37, 2018 AFL Women's draft
- Debut: Round 1, 2019, Adelaide vs. Western Bulldogs, at Norwood Oval
- Height: 165 cm (5 ft 5 in)
- Position: Forward

Club information
- Current club: Geelong
- Number: 14

Playing career^{1}
| Years | Club | Games (Goals) |
| 2019–2021 | Adelaide | 17 (13) |
| 2022 (S6)– | Geelong | 32 (41) |
| Total | | 49 (54) |
- ^{1} Playing statistics correct to the end of the 2024 season.

Career highlights
- AFLW premiership player: 2019; AFL Women's All-Australian team: 2022 (S7); Mark of the Year: 2022 (S7)

Chloe Scheer (born 7 October 1999) is an Australian rules footballer playing for the Geelong Football Club in the AFL Women's (AFLW).

== Early life and state football ==
Scheer was a talented underage cricketer, classed as a top order batter. She played four years for the Gawler Centrals all-boys cricket team, after which she transferred to Northern Jets and played there for six years. Since the age of 12 she played in Grade A teams, and won two Grand Finals. She also represented South Australia's state team in 2010, 2012, and 2015.

Despite being turned away by her club due to rules of gender, Scheer stayed determined to play football and joined Salisbury West's under-16 team. With them she won a premiership, and after a year there joined Modbury, where she played her junior football. She won the Rell Smith Medal, the medal given to the under-18 best and fairest in the South Australian Women's Football League (SAWFL), three consecutive times in the years 2015–2017. In 2016, she also won the Dutschke Medal, the medal given to the senior best and fairest in the SAWFL. Scheer was also a key player for North Adelaide in the inaugural season of the SANFL Women's League in 2017. She was one of North Adelaide's best players in the Grand Final, which they lost to Norwood. At the 2017 AFL Women's Under 18 Championships, Scheer represented South Australia and was selected for the initial squad of the All-Australian team.

== AFL Women's career ==
Scheer was supposed to be drafted in the 2017 AFL Women's draft, but ruptured her left anterior cruciate ligament late in the season. Following rehabilitation, she was drafted by Adelaide with their third selection and thirty-seventh overall in the 2018 AFL Women's draft. She made her debut in the one point loss to the Western Bulldogs at Norwood Oval in the opening round of the 2019 season. In round 5 of the season, she was nominated for the 2019 AFL Women's Rising Star award. Scheer played in the 2019 AFL Women's Grand Final, in which Adelaide claimed their second premiership. During the match, she suffered another anterior cruciate ligament injury, this time to her right knee. Following the 2019 season, Adelaide re-signed Scheer on a two-year contract.

It was revealed that Scheer could move to Geelong in the wake of the 2021 AFL Women's season. She officially requested a trade on 29 May 2021. Scheer was traded to Geelong at the conclusion of the 2021 AFL Women's season.

In season 7, Scheer made the All-Australian team and won Mark of the Year for her spectacular mark against North Melbourne in round 4.

She unfortunately has not played football since 2023 with a toe injury keeping her on the sidelines at Geelong.

== Personal life ==
Scheer was born in Gawler, South Australia and went to school at Gawler and District College. Her older sister Abbey plays football for Angle Vale Football Club.
