= Hannah Button =

Australian rules footballer

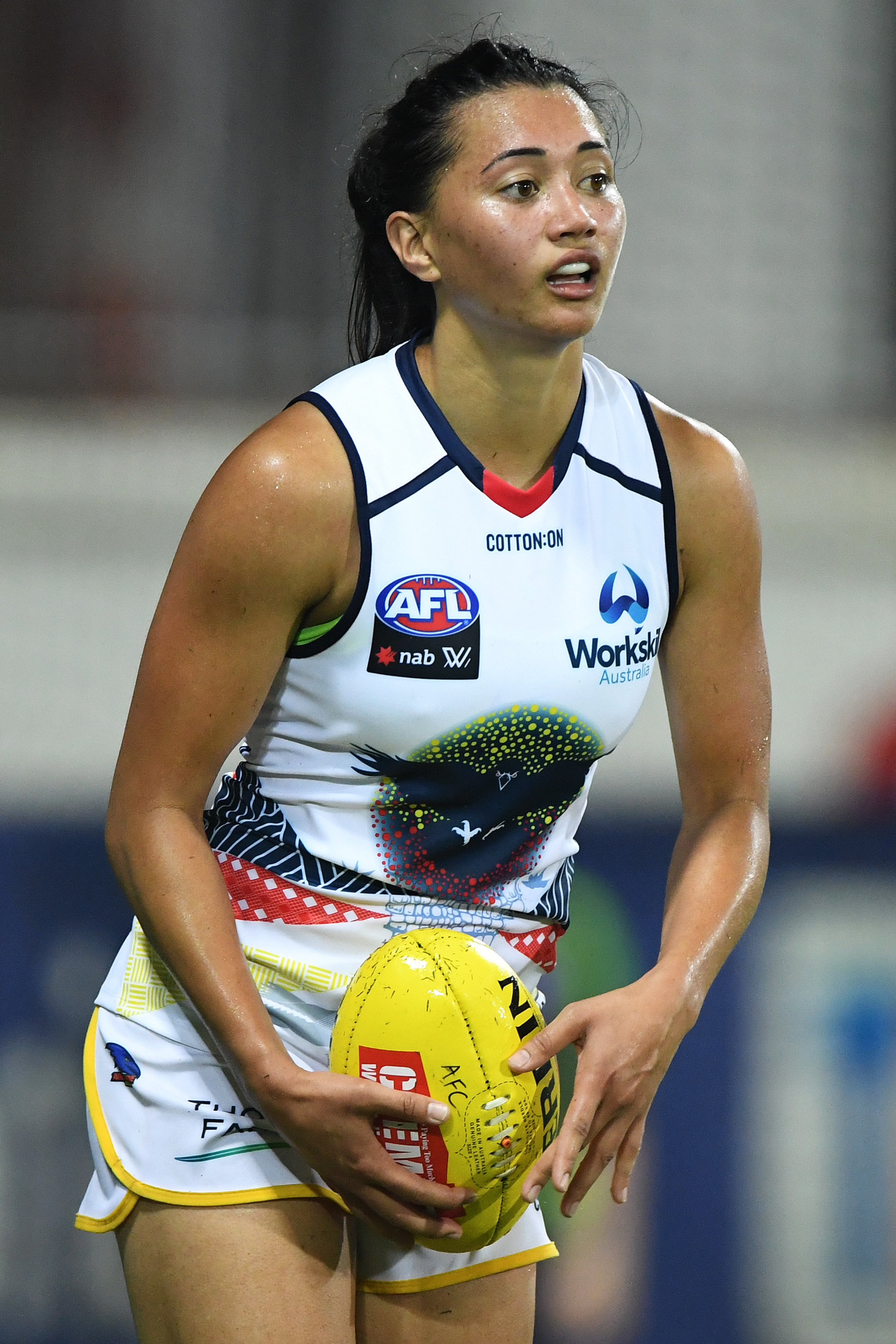
- Button playing for Adelaide in January 2019

Personal information
- Born: 27 November 1996 (age 29); Yorke Peninsula, South Australia
- Original team: West Adelaide (SANFLW)
- Draft: No. 53, 2018 AFL Women's draft
- Debut: Round 1, 2019, Adelaide vs. Western Bulldogs, at Norwood Oval
- Height: 165 cm (5 ft 5 in)
- Position: Midfielder

Club information
- Current club: Adelaide
- Number: 6

Playing career^{1}
Years	Club	Games (Goals)
2019–	Adelaide	39 (3)
- ^{1} Playing statistics correct to the end of the 2023 season.

Career highlights
- 2× AFL Women's premiership player: 2019, 2022 (S6); SANFLW best and fairest: 2018

Hannah Button (née Martin, born 27 November 1996) is an Australian rules footballer playing for the Adelaide Football Club in the AFL Women's (AFLW).

== Early life and state football ==
Button tried many sports, including netball, basketball, tennis, and soccer. Only in 2017, after moving to Adelaide, did she try Australian rules football, together with her sister Rachelle. With West Adelaide, she started out playing in the amateur league but moved up quickly to the SANFL Women's League (SANFLW) for the 2018 season. She averaged 15 disposals over the season and was selected for the 2018 SANFLW Team of the Year. Furthermore, she won the 2018 SANFLW best and fairest award. In 2019, after playing a season with Adelaide in the AFL Women's (AFLW), Button joined NT Thunder for the VFL Women's (VFLW) season. She played six games for them, before rupturing her right anterior cruciate ligament.

== AFL Women's career ==
Button was drafted by Adelaide with their sixth selection and fifty-third overall in the 2018 AFL Women's draft. Adelaide's GM of Football Administration, Phil Harper, said about her that "She has serious speed and can run and carry the ball on a wing or win it in the contest. Hannah is keen to learn and has a lot of upside as someone relatively new to the game." She made her debut in the one point loss to the Western Bulldogs at Norwood Oval in the opening round of the 2019 season. She helped Adelaide win the 2019 premiership, missing only one game during the season. After picking up an anterior cruciate ligament injury playing for NT Thunder in the VFL Women's (VFLW), Button was placed on the inactive list for the 2020 season. Due to the timing of her injury, Adelaide were compensated with an extra draft pick in the 2019 AFL Women's draft.

== Personal life ==
Button was born on the Yorke Peninsula to an Australian father and a Filipino mother. Her younger sister, Rachelle, is also a footballer, playing for West Adelaide in the SANFL Women's League (SANFLW) and for Adelaide in the AFL Women's (AFLW). In October 2019, Button married her long term-partner, Karl, in the Adelaide Hills and took his family name. Button has a teaching degree from the University of South Australia.
