= Jess Foley (sportswoman) =

Australian rules footballer and basketball player

- Born: 20 April 1983 (age 43); Bega, New South Wales, Australia
- Height: 183 cm (6 ft 0 in)
- Basketball career

Career information
- College: Duke (2002–2006)
- WNBA draft: 2006: 3rd round, 38th overall pick
- Drafted by: Indiana Fever
- Position: Small forward
- Stats at Basketball Reference
Australian rules football career
Personal information
- Draft: No. 30, 2018 national draft
- Debut: Round 1, 2019, Adelaide vs. Western Bulldogs, at Norwood Oval
- Position: Ruck / key forward
Playing career^{1}
Years	Club	Games (Goals)
2019–2020	Adelaide	13 (4)
- ^{1} Playing statistics correct to the end of the 2020 season.
Career highlights
- AFL Women's premiership player: 2019

Jessica Mary Ellen Foley (born 20 April 1983) is a retired Australian basketballer and Australian rules footballer. As a basketballer, Foley represented Australia at both junior and senior levels and played for Duke in college basketball in the United States. As an Australian rules footballer, Foley played for the Adelaide Football Club in the AFL Women's (AFLW), playing in an AFL Women's premiership in her first season.

== Basketball career ==
Foley commenced playing in the Women's National Basketball League (WNBL) in 1999. Since then, Foley has played for the AIS (1999/00 to 2000/01) and Adelaide Lightning (2006/07 to current).

In season 2007/08, Foley was selected to the WNBL All-Star Five. In 2011, Foley won the Halls Medal for the best and fairest player in the South Australian Women's competition.

Between 2002 and 2006, Foley attended Duke University in North Carolina and played for the Blue Devils. As a junior, Foley set a single season record with 68 three-pointers made.

In the 2006 WNBA draft, Foley was selected in round 3 (pick 38 overall) by the Indiana Fever, but did not play because of injury. In 2008, Foley was traded to the Connecticut Sun, but returned to Australia without playing a WNBA game.

At official FIBA events, Foley played for Australia at the 2001 World Championship for Junior Women, the 2003 World Championship for Young Women and the 2009 FIBA Oceania Championship for Women, where she won a Gold medal.

=== Duke statistics ===
Legend
GP	Games played	GS	Games started	MPG	Minutes per game
FG%	Field goal percentage	3P%	3-point field goal percentage	FT%	Free throw percentage
RPG	Rebounds per game	APG	Assists per game	SPG	Steals per game
BPG	Blocks per game	PPG	Points per game	**Bold**	Career high

	Team	GP	Points	FG%	3P%	FT%	RPG	APG	SPG	BPG	PPG
2002-03	Duke	32	174	41.5%	34.9%	84.6%	2.1	1.9	0.6	0.1	5.4
2003-04	Duke	34	187	34.7%	32.8%	**85.0%**	1.9	2.0	1.0	0.2	5.5
2004-05	Duke	34	**371**	39.0%	35.6%	79.7%	**4.0**	**3.6**	**1.9**	**0.3**	**10.9**
2005-06	Duke	**35**	197	**44.4%**	**40.2%**	84.2%	1.6	1.7	0.8	0.1	5.6
Career		135	929	39.5%	35.7%	82.1%	2.4	2.3	1.1	0.1	6.9

== AFLW career ==
Foley was drafted by Adelaide at pick no. 30 in the 2018 national draft. In March 2020, she retired to focus on her medical career.

Following her retirement, Foley has been a ruck coach and team doctor at Geelong in 2021 and joined the club's AFLW coaching panel for 2022 AFL Women's season 6 as an assistant coach with responsibility for the defence.

== See also ==
- WNBL All-Star Five
