= Rachelle Martin =

Australian rules footballer

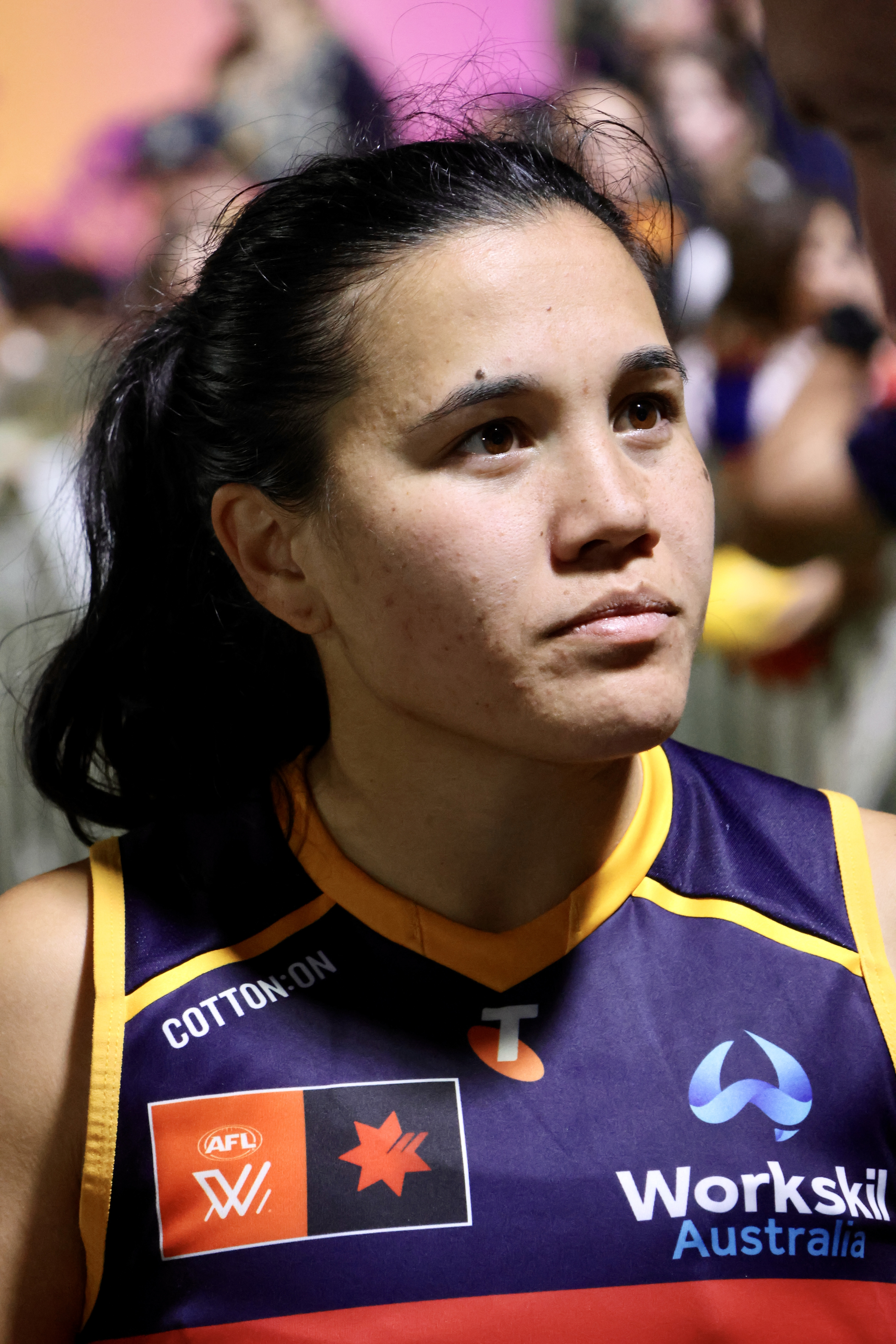
- Martin in 2025

Personal information
- Full name: Rachelle Martin
- Born: 16 February 1999 (age 27); Yorke Peninsula, South Australia
- Original team: West Adelaide (SANFLW)
- Draft: No. 45, 2019 draft
- Debut: Round 1, 2020, Adelaide vs. Brisbane, at Hickey Park
- Height: 153 cm (5 ft 0 in)
- Position: Midfielder

Playing career^{1}
Years	Club	Games (Goals)
2020–2025	Adelaide	61 (17)
- ^{1} Playing statistics correct to the end of 2025.

Career highlights
- AFL Women's premiership player: 2022 (S6); SANFLW Best and Fairest: 2020; 2x West Adelaide Best and Fairest: 2018, 2020

Rachelle Martin (born 16 February 1999) is a former Australian rules footballer who played for Adelaide in the AFL Women's (AFLW). She is a premiership player for the Crows alongside her sister Hannah Button.

== Junior career ==
Martin's junior club was Fitzroy in the Adelaide Footy League. She was signed by West Adelaide and won their best and fairest award in 2018. In 2020, as vice-captain of West Adelaide, Martin won the SANFL Women's League Best and Fairest Award alongside Crows teammate Anne Hatchard, as well as her second club best and fairest award.

== AFL Women's career ==
Martin was signed to Adelaide in 2019 as she was invited to train with the senior squad. One of two in Adelaide's train-on list, she was signed as a rookie semi-available for selection following the long-term injury of Chelsea Randall. Less than a week later, Martin made her shock AFL Women's debut in round one of the 2020 season against Brisbane, due to late changes in the squad. Martin did not play any further games in her rookie year.

Martin was officially drafted by Adelaide in the following off-season, taken by the club at pick 45 in the 2020 draft. She became a premiership player in 2022 when the Crows beat Melbourne during season six. Martin was named as one of the Crows' best on the day.

Martin played her 50th AFL Women's game the 2024 match against Essendon. She was delisted by the club following the 2025 AFL Women's season, with 61 appearances to her name across seven seasons.

== Personal life ==
Martin, along with sister, Hannah, grew up on a family farm in the Yorke Peninsula "between Minlaton and Stansbury". She is a university graduate and practicing accountant.
