= 2022 AFL Women's season 7 Grand Final =

2022 Australian football match

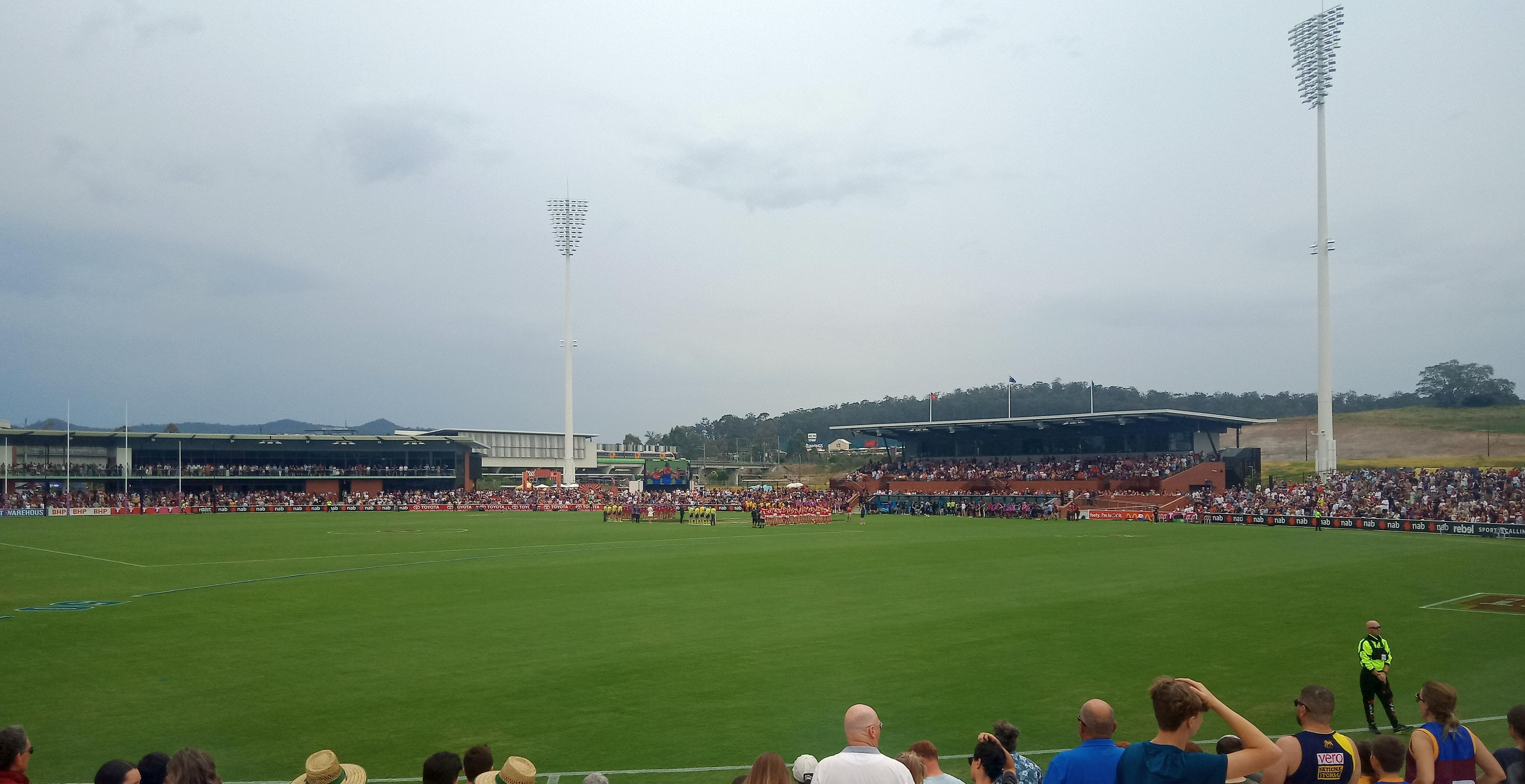
- Brighton Homes Arena, venue of the match, during the national anthem

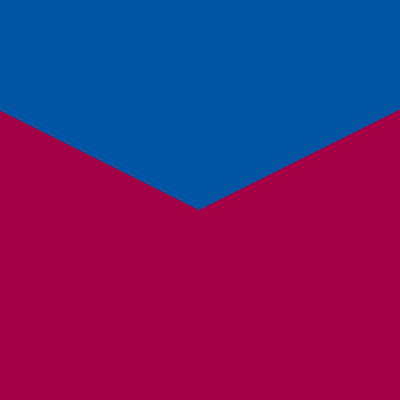

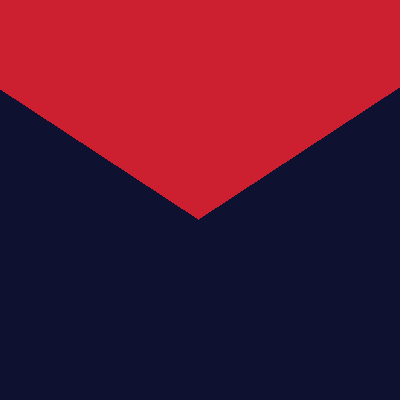
| Brisbane | Melbourne |
|---|---|
| 2.3 (15) | 2.7 (19) |
| | 1 | 2 | 3 | 4 |
|---|---|---|---|---|
| BL | 2.0 (12) | 2.0 (12) | 2.3 (15) | 2.3 (15) |
| MEL | 0.1 (1) | 1.4 (10) | 2.5 (17) | 2.7 (19) |
- Date: 27 November 2022
- Stadium: Brighton Homes Arena
- Attendance: 7,412
- Umpires: Thomas Chrystie, Joel Clamp, and Nick Jankovskis

Ceremonies
- National anthem: Cody Simpson

Broadcast in Australia
- Network: Seven Network
- Commentators: Jason Bennett (commentator); Jo Wotton (commentator); Melissa Hickey (expert commentator); Abbey Holmes (expert commentator); Nat Edwards (host and boundary rider); Samantha Lane (boundary rider)

The 2022 AFL Women's season 7 Grand Final was an Australian football match held at the Brighton Homes Arena on 27 November 2022 to determine the premiers of the seventh season of the AFL Women's (AFLW) competition. The match was contested between the Brisbane Lions and the Melbourne Football Club. It was played in 30 °C (86 °F) heat. Melbourne emerged as winners by four points.

== Qualification ==
Both the Brisbane Lions and the Melbourne Demons finished at the top of the ladder at the end of the home and away season. In an attempt to secure the top spot in the final round, Melbourne booted 11.13 (79) against a hapless West Coast, keeping their opponent to a single point. In the end, the Demons fell short by just 0.3 of a percent - a single point. In the Semi-Final, Melbourne faced Adelaide, the reigning premiers. The Demons had a shaky start, conceding the first three goals of the game, but managed to keep Adelaide scoreless in the second quarter while kicking three goals of their own to lead at half time. The Demons kicked seven goals in the last three quarters to Adelaide's 1.1. In the preliminary final, the Demons overcame a tough North Melbourne, who dominated forward entries but failed to capitalise against Melbourne's defence.

Brisbane's path to the Grand Final involved first defeating Richmond, a new but much improved side that had inflicted their only defeat of the season, and then defeated Adelaide in the Preliminary Final. The Lions had a good season: they were the minor premiers, full-forward Jesse Wardlaw was the league's leading goal kicker with 22 goals for the season, and rover Ally Anderson won the best and fairest. Brisbane was favoured to win the premiership; three of the previous five AFLW premierships had been won by the minor premiers. Although this was the first time these two teams played each other in an AFLW Grand Final, it was Brisbane's fourth grand final and Melbourne's second. It was also the first AFLW grand final to be played in November.

== Venue ==
There was a controversy regarding the venue choice; as the higher ranked team, Brisbane had the choice of location, but The Gabba and Metricon Stadium were unavailable, the former due to a Sheffield Shield match, the latter due to a music festival featuring Calvin Harris. The brand new $80 million Brighton Homes Arena was therefore chosen. Some concern was raised that the venue held just 600 grandstand seats, and had a capacity of 8,000 people, which led to 3AW journalist Tom Elliott suggesting Marvel Stadium was a better choice of ground. An initial issue of 6,500 tickets was sold out within minutes, and a second issue of tickets sold out just as quickly.

== Broadcast and entertainment ==
The match was broadcast live in Australia on the Seven Network and Fox Footy. The match was also available via streaming platforms 7plus, Kayo Sports, and the AFL and AFLW apps.

The 7 broadcast was anchored by Nat Edwards, with the match called by Jason Bennett and Jo Wotton, special comments from 2017 Premiership player Abbey Holmes and former Geelong captain, 7-time VFLW Premiership player and 2017 All-Australian Mel Hickey. Edwards provided updates from the boundary alongside Sam Lane.

Fox Footy's broadcast was hosted by Kelli Underwood, with special inputs from former Bulldogs captain, 2018 Premiership player and 3-time All-Australian Ellie Blackburn, 2-time All-Australian, Collingwood best-and-fairest and 2018 Rising Star Chloe Molloy and Carlton coach Daniel Harford, with Fox Sports News reporter Megan Waters providing updates and interviews from the Brighton Homes Arena surface.

2022 (S7) AFLW Grand Final - Radio Commentators
| Network | Distribution | Play-by-play commentators | Special comments | Boundary rider |
|---|---|---|---|---|
| ABC Radio | National | Quentin Hull Jess Webster | Chyloe Kurdas Jamie Stanton | Michael Price |
| Triple M | National | Leigh Montagna | Kate McCarthy | |
| 3AW 6PR FiveAA | Melbourne, VIC Perth, WA Adelaide, SA | Matt Granland | Matt Skubis Kirsty Lamb | |

=== Entertainment ===
Delta Goodrem performed pre-match entertainment, which was sponsored by Telstra. Goodrem had earlier performed at the 2022 AFL Grand Final with Robbie Williams. The match was sponsored by the National Australia Bank. Cody Simpson sang the national anthem.

== Teams ==
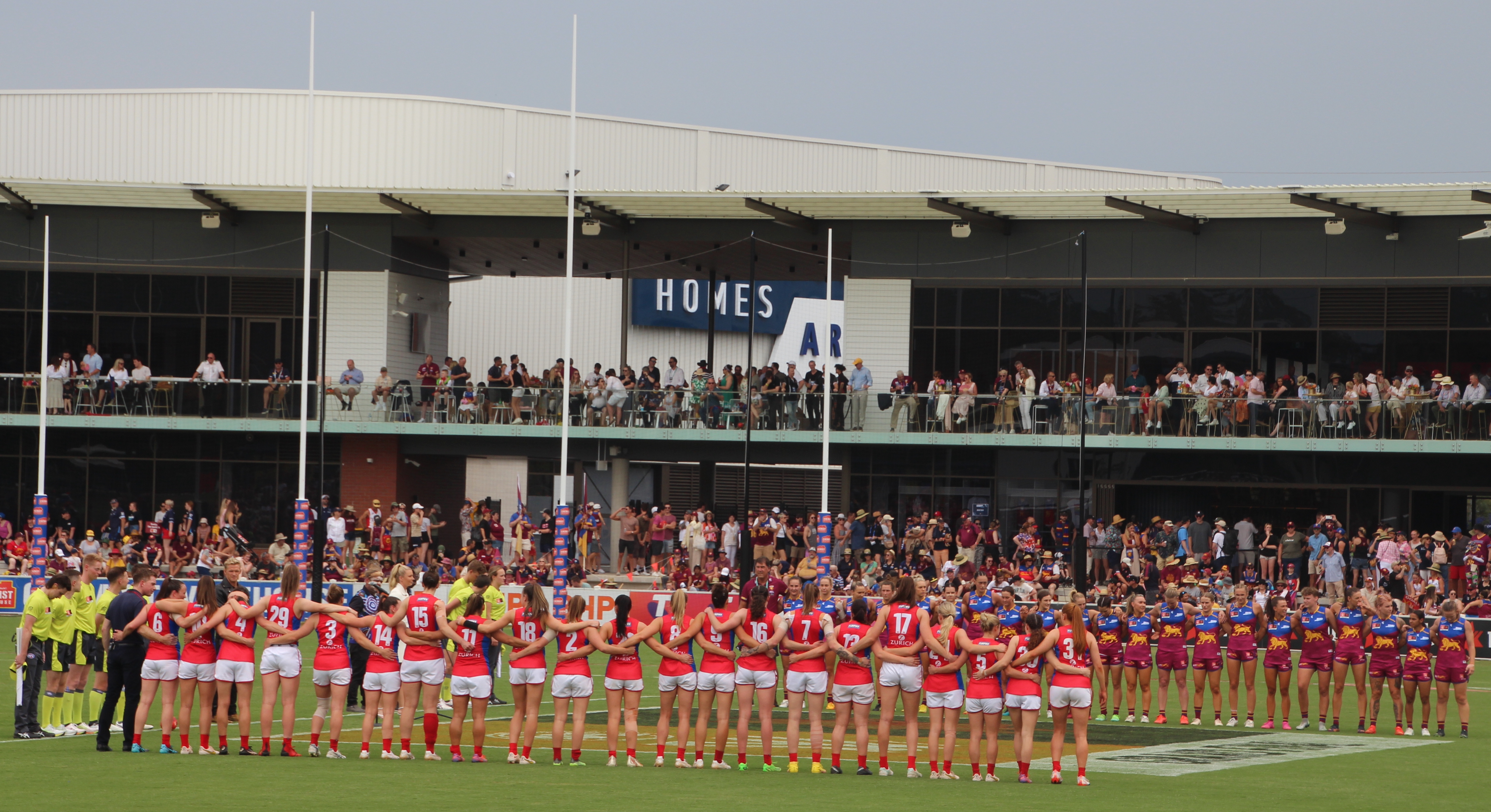
The teams lined up for the national anthem

Final teams were named on Saturday 26 November. Both sides announced unchanged line ups. Despite injury concerns, both Brisbane's Taylor Smith and Melbourne's Tayla Harris were named to play. They had played the previous week despite ankle and shoulder injuries respectively. It was the 50th game, tenth final and fourth grand final for Brisbane's Kate Lutkins, who suffered an ACL injury on 9 January but rejoined the team mid-season.

Brisbane Lions
| B: | 20 Shannon Campbell | 11 Phoebe Monahan | |
| HB: | 3 Breanna Koenen (c) | 10 Nat Grider | 5 Jade Ellenger |
| C: | 9 Orla O'Dwyer | 1 Emily Bates | 12 Sophie Conway |
| HF: | 21 Courtney Hodder | 14 Dakota Davidson | 17 Belle Dawes |
| F: | 30 Jesse Wardlaw | 15 Greta Bodey | |
| Foll: | 2 Tahlia Hickie | 25 Cathy Svarc | 18 Ally Anderson |
| Int: | 13 Kate Lutkins | 23 Dee Heslop | 31 Taylor Smith |
| Int: | 27 Mikayla Pauga | 29 Ruby Svarc | |
| Coach: | Craig Starcevich | | |

Emergency: Lulu Pullar, Zimmorlei Farquharson, Sharni Webb

Melbourne
| B: | 9 Libby Birch | 17 Tahlia Gillard | |
| HB: | 30 Shelley Heath | 3 Maddi Gay | 23 Sinéad Goldrick |
| C: | 8 Sarah Lampard | 5 Tyla Hanks | 31 Blaithin Mackin |
| HF: | 16 Alyssa Bannan | 4 Karen Paxman | 10 Kate Hore |
| F: | 6 Daisy Pearce (c) | 7 Tayla Harris | |
| Foll: | 15 Lauren Pearce | 2 Olivia Purcell | 11 Eliza West |
| Int: | 13 Maeve Chaplin | 18 Casey Sherriff | 14 Lily Mithen |
| Int: | 29 Eden Zanker | 24 Megan Fitzsimon | |
| Coach: | Mick Stinear | | |

Emergency: Charlotte Wilson, Jordan Ivey, Maggie Caris

=== Umpires ===
2022 AFL Women's season 7 Grand Final umpires
| Position | Umpires |
|---|---|
| Field umpires | Thomas Chrystie, Joel Clamp, Nick Jankovskis – Emergency: James Strybos |
| Boundary umpires | Trent Bowes, Will Morris, Blake Anderson, Dominic Schiliro |
| Goal umpires | Adam Steger, Tayla Manning – Emergency: Taylor Mattioli |

== Match summary ==
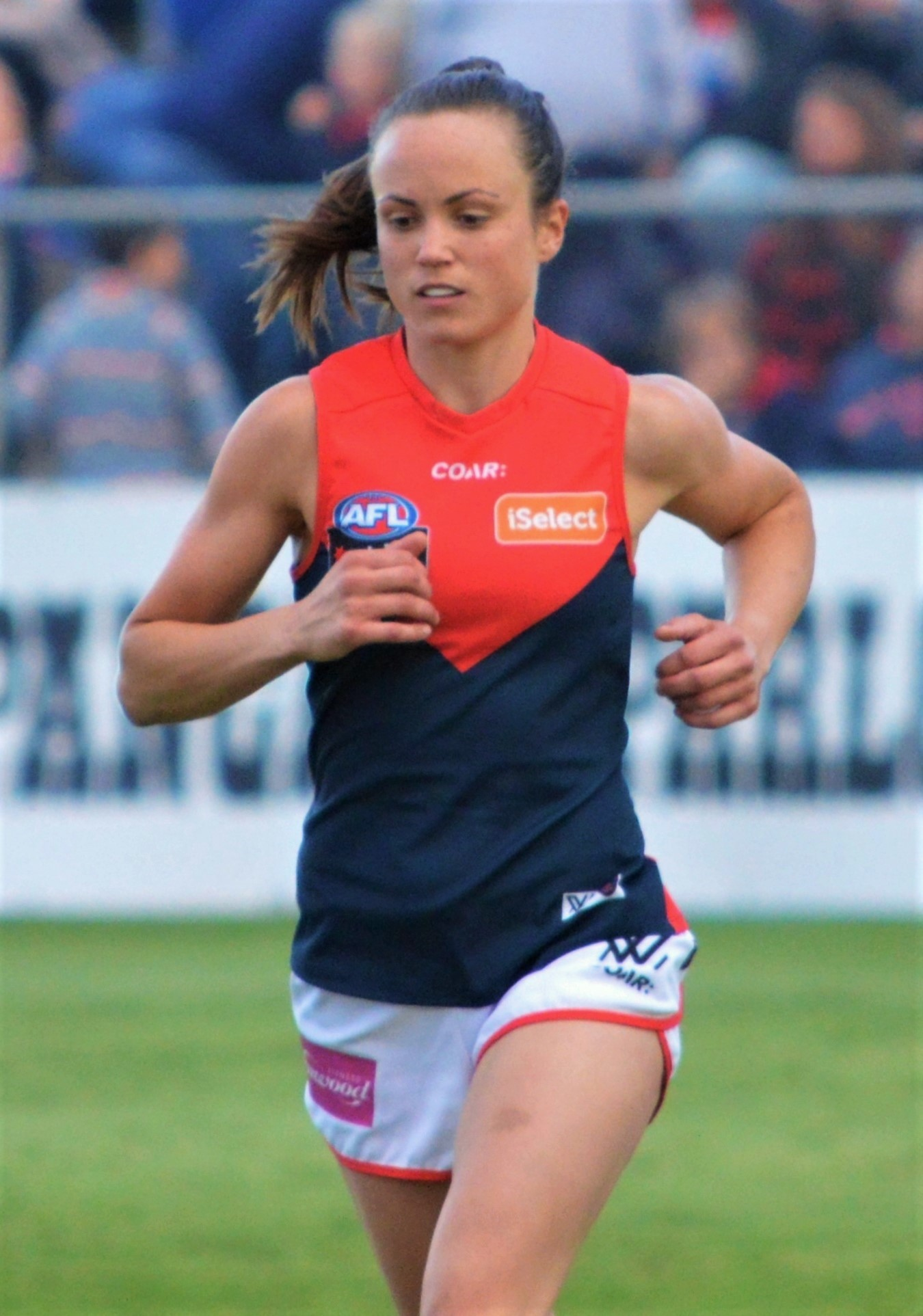
Melbourne skipper Daisy Pearce

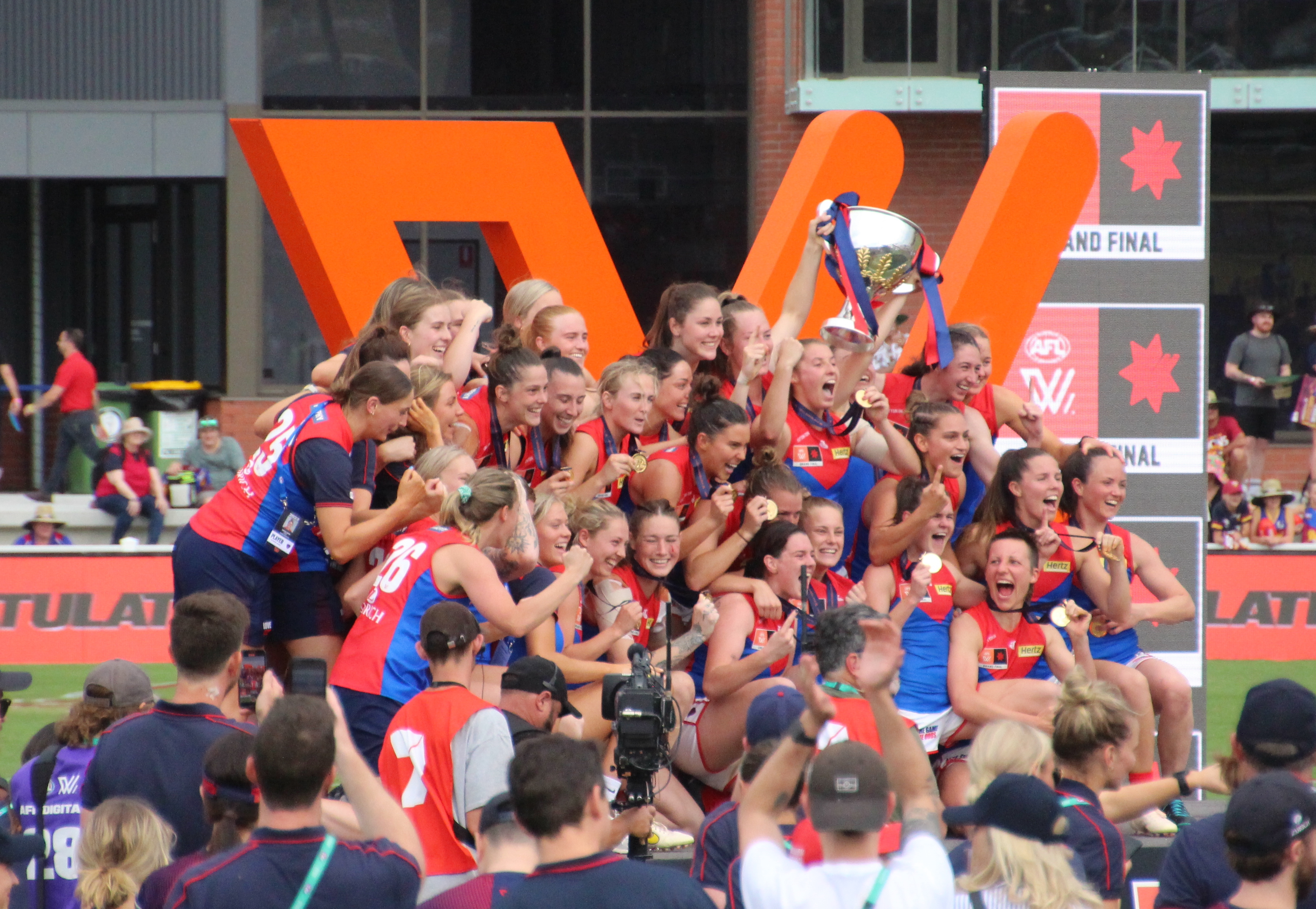
Melbourne players celebrating with the AFL Women's premiership trophy

The match commenced in 30 °C (86 °F) heat, which resulted in the AFLW enacting its heat policy, which lengthened the breaks between quarters and allowed for two extra water carriers. An early shot at goal by Melbourne's Daisy Pearce missed, and resulted in a behind. Within minutes Brisbane's Nat Grider took an intercept mark and hit up a lead from forward Dakota Davidson, who scored the opening goal of the match. On the next centre bounce, the Lions took possession and booted the ball up into their forward fifty-metre arc. In the desperate scramble that followed, Brisbane's Cathy Svarc was subjected to a high tackle, and was awarded a free kick, which she converted to score the second major of the match. Melbourne broke loose in the final minutes of the quarter. Melbourne's Megan Fitzsimon headed for an open goal square, accompanied by her teammate Alyssa Bannan, but what looked like a certain goal was averted at the last moment by a desperate tackle from Grider. The end of the quarter saw the Lions leading the goalless Demons by 11 points.

The second quarter saw Melbourne fight back. Melbourne ruck Lauren Pearce, who ended the day with 17 hitouts, and rover Eliza West, who had 19 disposals, dominated around the clearances, and during the second term the Demons led 16–10 in the inside 50 count. The Demons' Blaithin Mackin scored the team's first major, but scoring opportunities remained elusive. Lions' skipper Breanna Koenen limped off the ground with a knee injury, but the Lions' defence remained in the capable hands of defenders Kate Lutkins and Shannon Campbell, who racked up 19 possessions and eight marks for the day, and the Demons managed only another three behinds for the quarter. Koenen was back on the oval again after the half time break with her knee heavily strapped. At the other end of the ground, Melbourne's Tahlia Gillard managed to keep the Lions' tall forward Jesse Wardlaw quiet: she had little impact and kicked no goals. At half time, the Demons were just two points behind. Rain fell heavily during the break, which had been extended by 20 minutes due to the heat policy.

Melbourne got off to a good start in the third quarter, which was mainly played in Melbourne's forward half. Reward for effort remained elusive: a free kick awarded to Eliza West that looked like another goal opportunity fell short. Then Tayla Harris took a mark in the goal square and converted. It was the fourth time she had played in an AFLW Grand Final, and second time she had scored a goal in one. The goal put her side in front for the first time since the opening minutes of the first quarter. (She also sustained a blow under the eye that left her bleeding and which had to be patched up.) Melbourne nearly scored another goal from a dribble kick from Casey Sherriff, but it hit the post. Different calls were made by two umpires, resulting in Alyssa Bannan tackling Dakota Davidson when she was about to take a free kick. Normally this would have resulted in a 50-metre penalty, but the umpires acknowledged that the mistake was theirs, and none was awarded; Davidson was simply instructed to take her kick. The Lions had a chance to regain the lead late in the quarter, but a kick from Davidson missed to the right.

The final quarter was a desperate affair with neither side able to score a goal, which would have given them the win. Melbourne had the most opportunities, but managed only a rushed behind. The final siren saw the underdog Demons emerge as the winners. AFL Commissioner Gabrielle Trainor presented the umpires' medals and AFLW premiership player Abbey Holmes presented the premiership cup to Melbourne captain Daisy Pearce and coach Mick Stinear. As is customary, premiership medals were presented to members of the winning team by child players from the Auskick program. Pearce placed her medal on the young girl presenting the medal. Pearce had won ten premierships with the Darebin Falcons, but this was her first AFLW premiership.

== Scoreboard ==
Grand Final
Sunday, 27 November (1:40 pm) (AEST UTC+10) | Brisbane | def. by | Melbourne | Brighton Homes Arena (crowd: 7,412) | Report
2.0 (12); 2.0 (12); 2.3 (15); 2.3 (15) | Q1; Q2; Q3; Final | 0.1 (1); 1.4 (10); 2.5 (17); 2.7 (19) | Umpires: Chrystie, Clamp, Jankovskis; Best on ground: Shannon Campbell (Brisbane); Television broadcast: Seven Network, Fox Footy; National anthem: Cody Simpson
1: Davidson, C. Svarc | Goals | 1: Mackin, Harris
Campbell, Grider, C. Svarc, Anderson, Bates | Best | Hanks, West, Gay, Purcell, Gillard
Koenen (knee) | Injuries | Nil
Nil | Reports | Nil

== Best on Ground medal ==
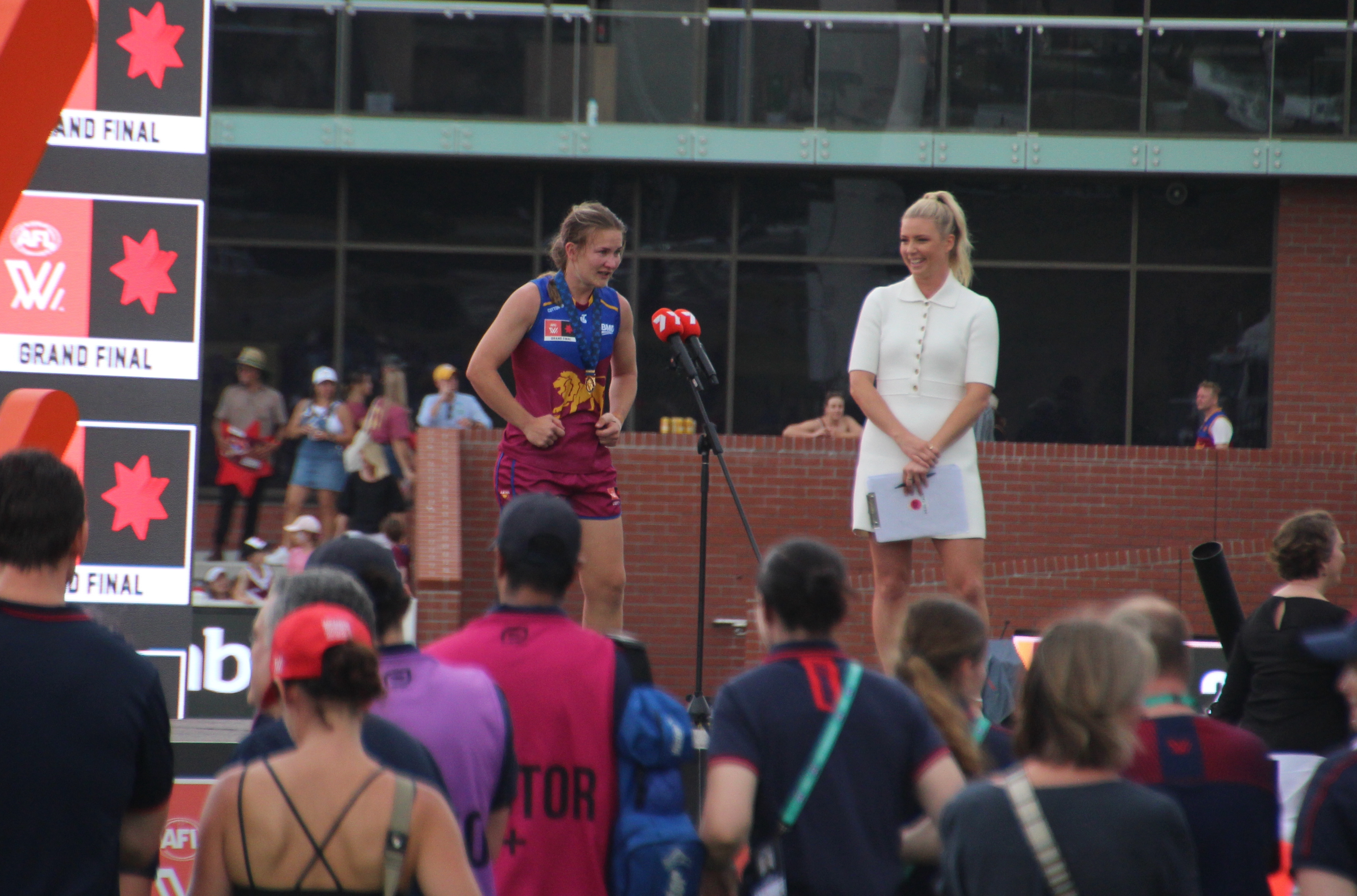
Shannon Campbell accepting the medal for her best on ground performance

Brisbane Lions defender Shannon Campbell was awarded the medal for the best player on the ground. Campbell was the first player from a losing AFL Women's Grand Final team to win the award, which was presented by AFL Commissioner Simone Wilkie.

Best on Ground Medal Voting Tally
| Position | Player | Club | Total votes | Vote summary |
|---|---|---|---|---|
| 1st (winner) | Shannon Campbell | Brisbane Lions | 12 | 3, 3, 2, 2, 2 |
| 2nd | Eliza West | Melbourne | 11 | 3, 3, 2, 2, 1 |
| 3rd – tied | Nat Grider | Brisbane Lions | 3 | 3 |
| 3rd – tied | Olivia Purcell | Melbourne | 3 | 1, 1, 1 |
| 5th | Cathy Svarc | Brisbane Lions | 1 | 1 |

| Voter | 3 Votes | 2 Votes | 1 Vote |
|---|---|---|---|
| Andrew Dillon (chair) | Eliza West | Shannon Campbell | Olivia Purcell |
| Melissa Hickey (Seven Network) | Shannon Campbell | Eliza West | Olivia Purcell |
| Debbie Lee (Australian Football Hall of Fame) | Eliza West | Shannon Campbell | Olivia Purcell |
| Marnie Vinall (Fairfax Media) | Shannon Campbell | Eliza West | Cathy Svarc |
| Megan Waters (Fox Footy) | Natalie Grider | Shannon Campbell | Eliza West |

== See also ==
- AFL Women's Grand Final
- 2022 AFL Grand Final
