= Alyssa Bannan =

Australian rules footballer

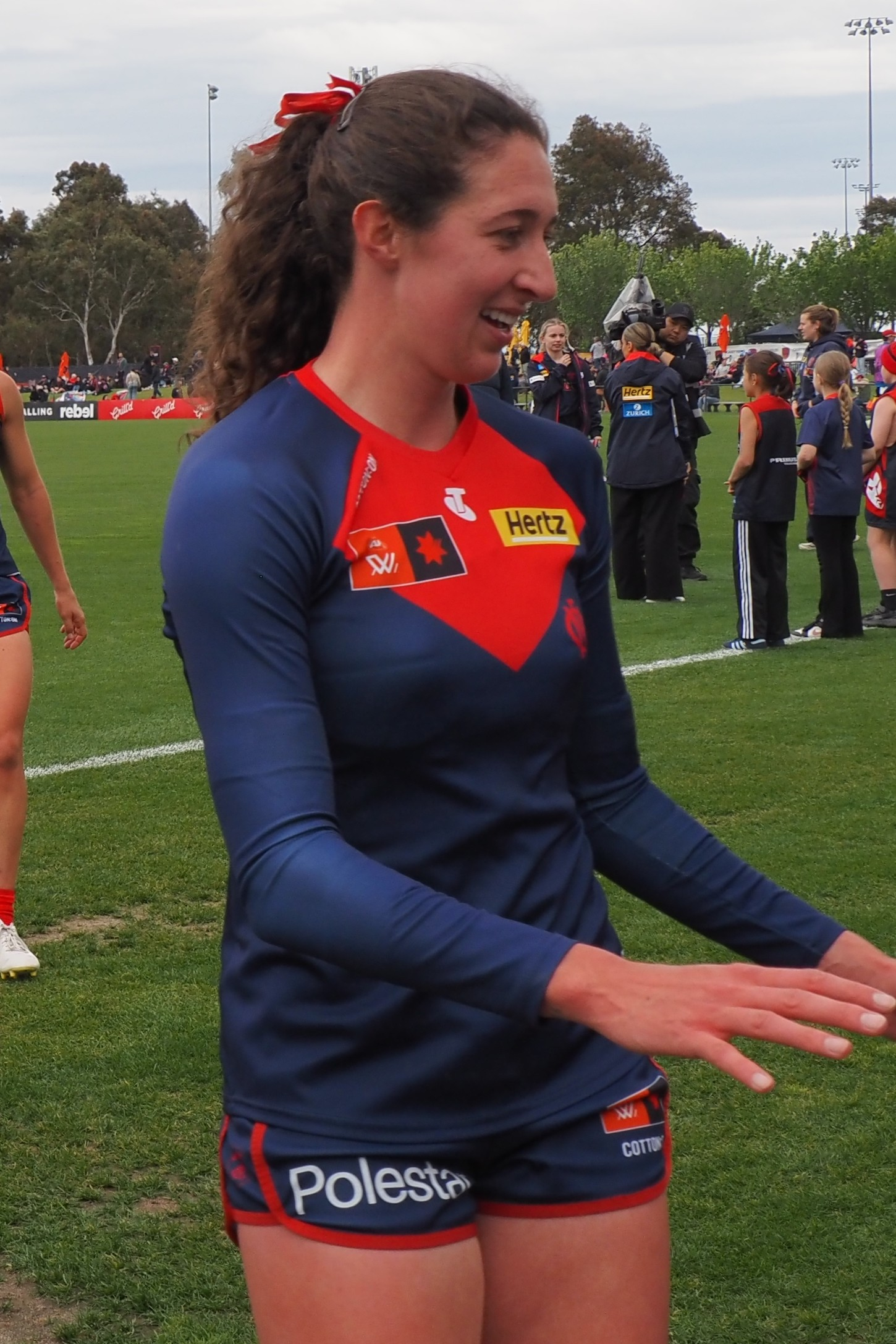
- Bannan during a half-time break with Melbourne in 2025

Personal information
- Born: 13 April 2002 (age 24)
- Original team: Northern Knights (NAB League Girls)
- Draft: No. 5, 2020 national draft
- Debut: Round 1, 2021, Melbourne vs. Gold Coast, at Metricon Stadium
- Height: 177 cm (5 ft 10 in)
- Position: Tall forward

Club information
- Current club: Melbourne
- Number: 16

Playing career^{1}
Years	Club	Games (Goals)
2021–	Melbourne	74 (62)
- ^{1} Playing statistics correct to the end of the 2025 season.

Career highlights
- AFLW premiership player: Season 7 (2022)

Alyssa Bannan (born 13 April 2002) is an Australian rules footballer playing for the Melbourne Football Club in the AFL Women's competition (AFLW). After a junior career with the Northern Knights in the NAB League Girls competition, Bannan was selected by Melbourne with the club's first selection and the fifth selection overall in the 2020 AFL Women's draft. She made her debut against Gold Coast at Metricon Stadium in the opening round of the 2021 season.
