= Jasmyn Hewett =

Australian rules footballer (born 1993)

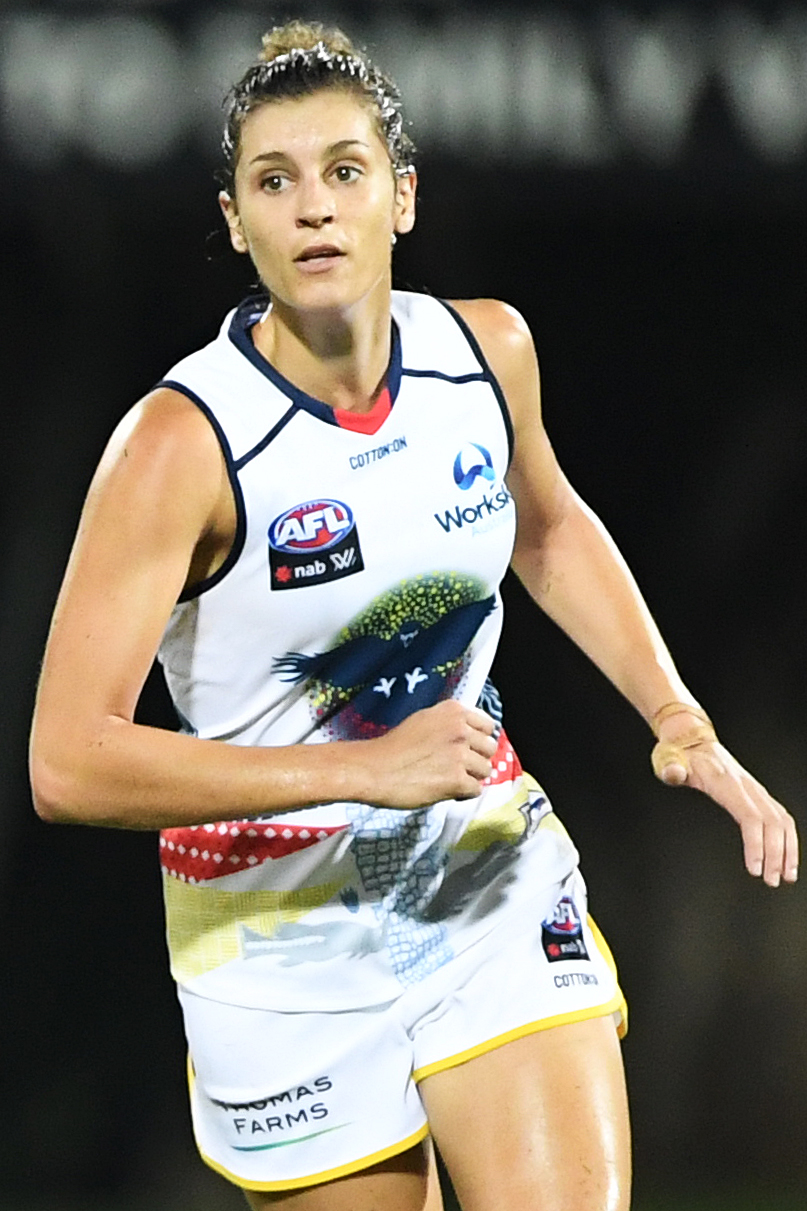
- Hewett playing for Adelaide in January 2019

Personal information
- Born: 28 September 1993 (age 33)
- Original team: St Mary's (NTFL)
- Draft: No. 16, 2017 AFL Women's draft
- Debut: Round 1, 2018, Adelaide vs. Brisbane, at Norwood Oval
- Height: 182 cm (6 ft 0 in)
- Position: Utility

Playing career^{1}
Years	Club	Games (Goals)
2018–2019	Adelaide	7 (2)
2020–2021	Gold Coast	6 (0)
2022 (S6)–2022 (S7)	Adelaide	3 (1)
Total		16 (3)
- ^{1} Playing statistics correct to the end of 2022 season 7.

Career highlights
- AFL Women's premiership player: 2022 (S6)

Jasmyn Hewett (born 28 September 1993) is an Australian rules footballer who played for Adelaide and for the Gold Coast in the AFL Women's (AFLW).

== Early life and career ==
Originally from Stirling North, South Australia, Hewett moved to Darwin, Northern Territory in May 2016. While living in Stirling North she had played netball and her only experience with football was kicking a football with her dad at home, but upon moving to Darwin she began playing for St Mary's Football Club in the 2016/17 NTFL Women's season. She kicked six goals in her first match and 36 goals for the season, the most at the club, and was named the league's rising star, also coming second in the league's Most Valuable Player Award. Hewett participated in the AFL Women's Draft Combine in 2017 and was ranked in the top 10 in all six physical tests, including being ranked second in the Yo-Yo test, the vertical jump and the 2 kilometre time trial.

== AFLW career ==
Hewett was drafted by Adelaide with their second selection and sixteenth overall in the 2017 AFL Women's draft. She made her debut in the twelve point loss to Brisbane at Norwood Oval in the opening round of the 2018 season.

After the AFLW season, Hewett was listed as one of the players in NT Thunder's squad for their inaugural season in the VFLW. She re-signed with Adelaide for the 2019 season in May 2018.

In April 2019, Hewett joined expansion club the Gold Coast.

In June 2021, Hewett returned to Adelaide, signing as a delisted free agent. Ahead of 2022 season 7, she was placed on the inactive list. In March 2023, it was understood by the club that for a second straight season, she wouldn't be able to play due to her work commitments as a rescue firefighter in Darwin. Therefore, the club decided to delist her but was welcomed to return if she had the chance to return to the AFLW.
