= Gabrielle Colvin =

Australian rules footballer

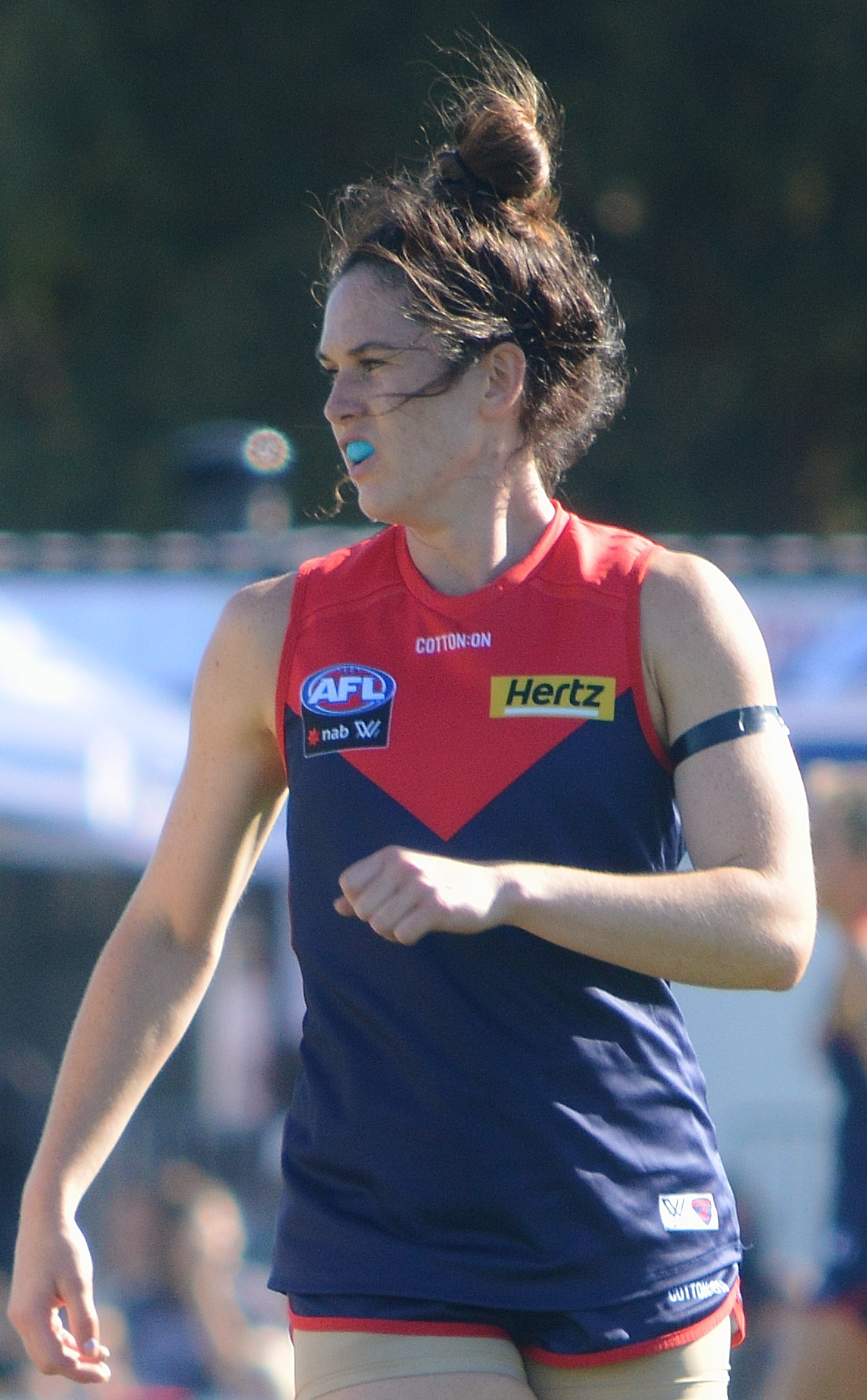
- Colvin in February 2021

Personal information
- Born: 1 March 1991 (age 35)
- Original team: Darebin Falcons (VFLW)
- Draft: No. 77, 2019 AFL Women's draft
- Debut: Round 1, 2020, Melbourne vs. North Melbourne, at Casey Fields
- Height: 175 cm (5 ft 9 in)
- Position: Defender

Club information
- Current club: Melbourne
- Number: 32

Playing career^{1}
Years	Club	Games (Goals)
2020–2025	Melbourne	27 (0)
- ^{1} Playing statistics correct to the end of the 2023 season.

Gabrielle Colvin (born 1 March 1991) is an Australian rules footballer playing for the Melbourne Football Club in the AFL Women's (AFLW). Colvin was drafted by Melbourne with their third selection and seventy-seventh overall in the 2019 AFL Women's draft. She made her debut against North Melbourne at Casey Fields in the opening round of the 2020 season.

Colvin was raised in Wagga Wagga where she played netball before taking up Australian rules.
