= Casey Sherriff =

Australian rules footballer

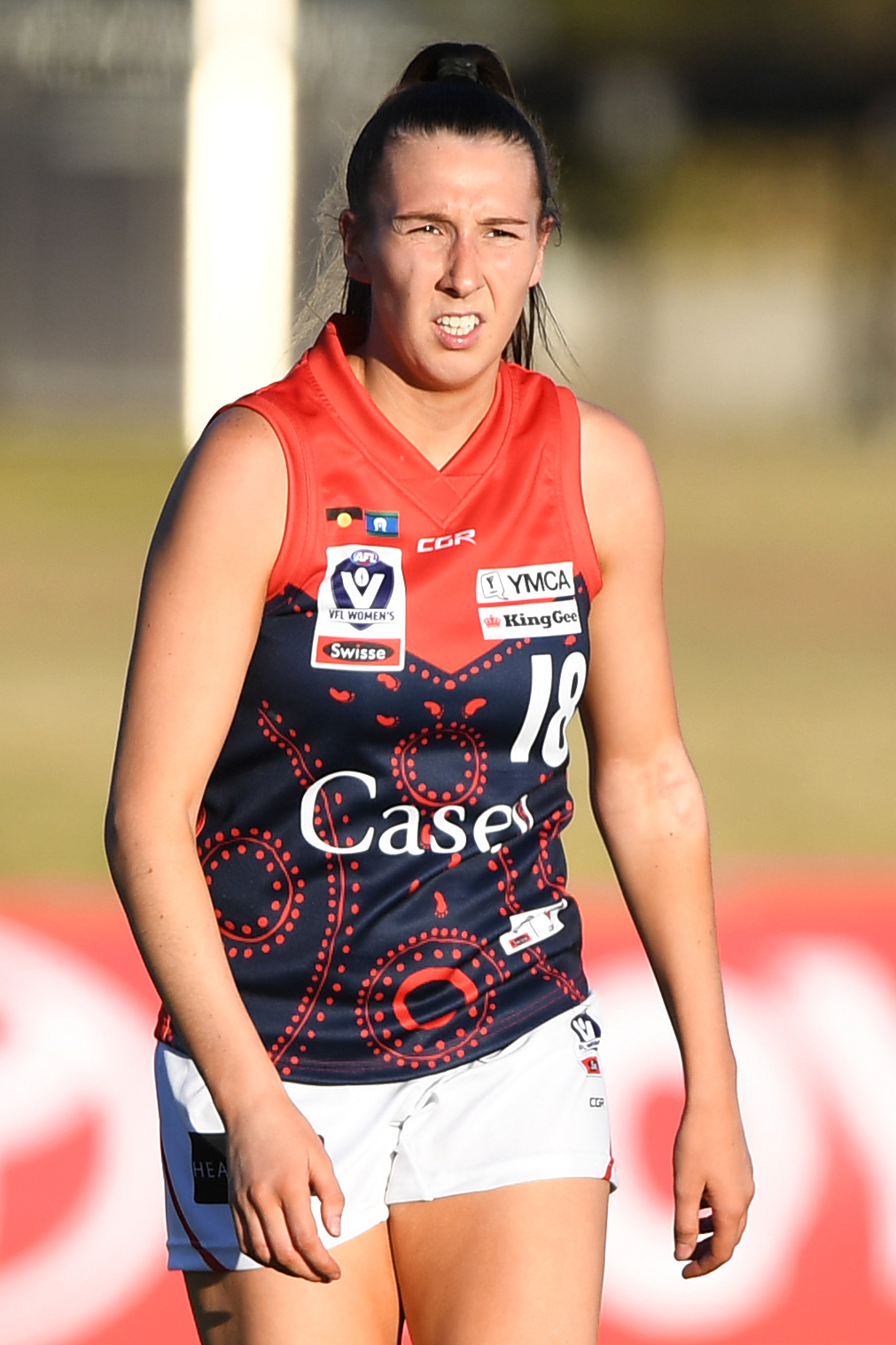
- Sherriff playing for Casey in July 2019

Personal information
- Full name: Casey Jayde Sherriff
- Born: 22 April 1998 (age 28)
- Original team: Casey (VFLW)
- Debut: Round 1, 2020, Melbourne vs. North Melbourne, at Casey Fields
- Height: 175 cm (5 ft 9 in)
- Position: Defender

Club information
- Current club: Hawthorn
- Number: 14

Playing career^{1}
Years	Club	Games (Goals)
2019–2023	Melbourne	48 (9)
2024–	Hawthorn	20 (5)
Total		68 (14)
- ^{1} Playing statistics correct to the end of 2025.

Career highlights
- AFLW premiership player: S7

Casey Jayde Sherriff (born 22 April 1998) is an Australian rules footballer playing for the Hawthorn Football Club in the AFL Women's (AFLW). Sherriff was recruited by Melbourne in September 2018 as a replacement for Melbourne captain, Daisy Pearce, who missed the 2019 season through pregnancy. She made her debut against North Melbourne at Casey Fields in the opening round of the 2020 season.

== Statistics ==
Updated to the end of 2025.

Legend
G	Goals	K	Kicks	D	Disposals	T	Tackles
B	Behinds	H	Handballs	M	Marks
#	Played in that season's premiership team

Season	Team	No.	Games	Totals							Averages (per game)							Votes
Season	Team	No.	Games	G	B	K	H	D	M	T	G	B	K	H	D	M	T	Votes
2020	Melbourne	18	7	2	2	35	24	59	15	24	0.3	0.3	5.0	3.4	8.4	2.1	3.4	0
2021	Melbourne	18	11	0	2	80	41	121	17	47	0.0	0.2	7.3	3.7	11.0	1.5	4.3	0
2022 (S6)	Melbourne	18	9	2	3	49	29	78	16	27	0.2	0.3	5.4	3.2	8.7	1.8	3.0	0
2022 (S7)^{#}	Melbourne	18	11	1	7	63	34	97	23	28	0.1	0.6	5.7	3.1	8.8	2.1	2.5	0
2023	Melbourne	18	10	4	7	36	43	79	14	33	0.4	0.7	3.6	4.3	7.9	1.4	3.3	0
2024	Hawthorn	14	6	3	1	39	10	49	7	19	0.5	0.2	6.5	1.7	8.2	1.2	3.2	0
2025	Hawthorn	12	14	2	3	68	44	112	12	36	0.1	0.2	4.9	3.1	8.0	0.9	2.6	2
Career			68	14	25	370	225	595	104	214	0.2	0.4	5.4	3.3	8.8	1.5	3.1	2

== Honours and achievements ==
Team

- AFLW premiership player (Melbourne): S7
- McClelland Trophy (Melbourne): 2023
- McClelland Trophy (Hawthorn): 2024
