= Lauren Pearce =

Australian rules footballer

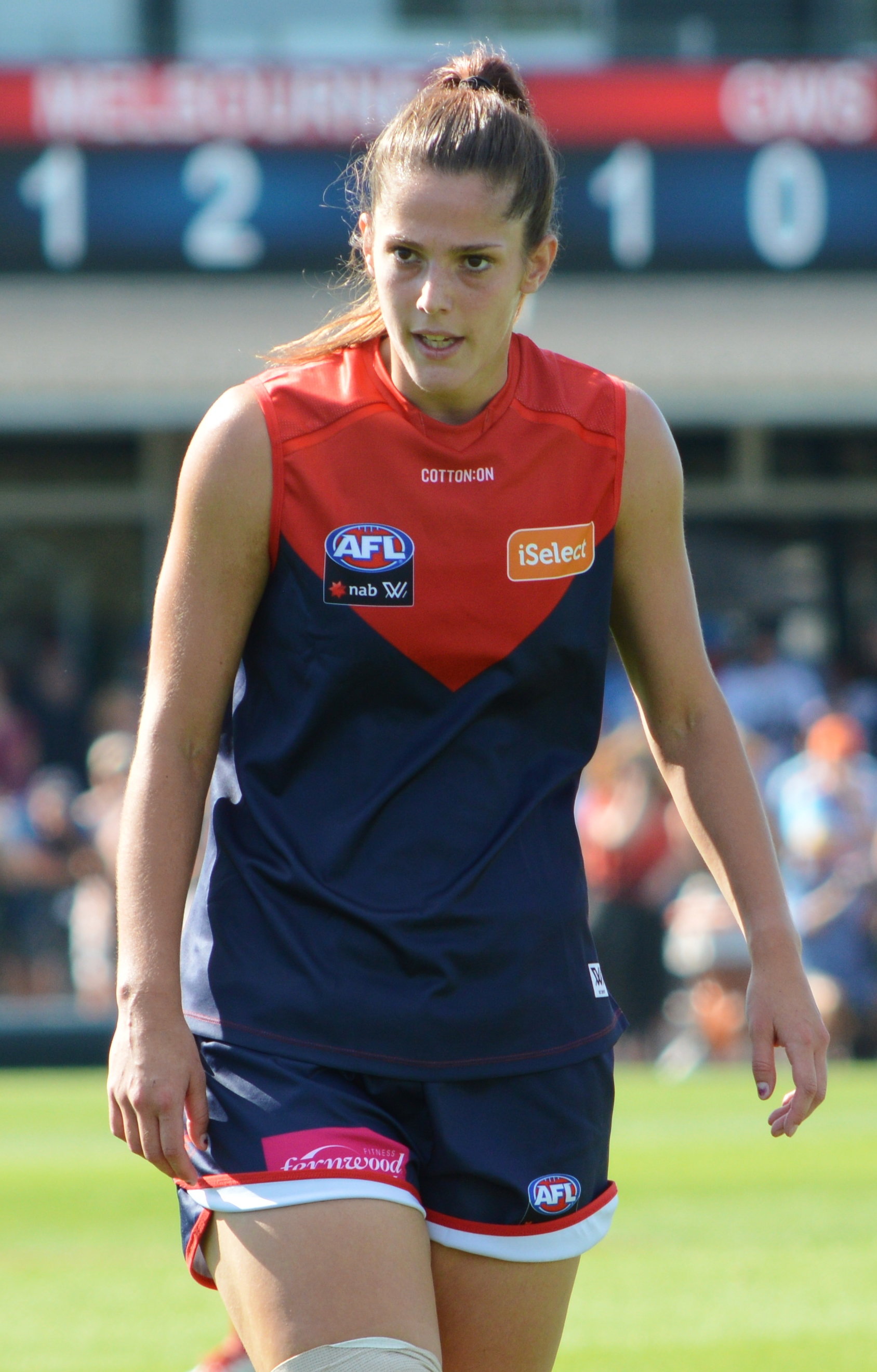
- Pearce playing for Melbourne in February 2018

Personal information
- Born: 12 January 1993 (age 33)
- Original team: Darebin Falcons (VFL Women's)
- Draft: No. 25, 2016 AFL Women's draft
- Debut: Round 1, 2017, Melbourne vs. Brisbane, at Casey Fields
- Height: 184 cm (6 ft 0 in)
- Position: Ruck

Club information
- Current club: Melbourne
- Number: 15

Playing career^{1}
Years	Club	Games (Goals)
2017–	Melbourne	68 (10)
- ^{1} Playing statistics correct to the end of the 2023 season.

Career highlights
- AFLW premiership player: 2022 (S7)

Lauren Pearce (born 12 January 1993) is an Australian rules footballer playing for the Melbourne Football Club in the AFL Women's competition. She was drafted by Melbourne with their fourth selection and twenty-fifth overall in the 2016 AFL Women's draft. She made her debut in the fifteen point loss to Brisbane at Casey Fields in the opening round of the 2017 season. She played every match in her debut season to finish with seven games.

Melbourne signed Pearce for the 2018 season during the trade period in May 2017.
