= List of AFL Women's debuts in 2020 =

The following is the list of players in the AFL Women's (AFLW) who have either made their AFLW debut or played for a new club during the 2020 AFL Women's season.

== Summary ==
Summary of debuts in 2020
Club	Debut		Total
Club	AFLW	New club	Total
Adelaide	8	1	9
Brisbane	9	1	10
Carlton	5	0	5
Collingwood	3	1	4
Fremantle	9	1	10
Geelong	3	0	3
Gold Coast	12	13	25
Greater Western Sydney	4	1	5
Melbourne	7	2	9
North Melbourne	6	1	7
Richmond	16	11	27
St Kilda	15	13	28
West Coast	13	14	27
Western Bulldogs	9	1	10
Total	119	60	179

== AFL Women's debuts ==
Name	Club	Age at debut	Debut round	Notes
Maddy Brancatisano	Richmond	19 years, 155 days	1	Expansion signing, 2019
Alice Edmonds	Richmond	21 years, 252 days	1	Expansion signing, 2019
Kodi Jacques	Richmond	19 years, 133 days	1	Expansion signing, 2019
Laura McClelland	Richmond	18 years, 219 days	1	Pick 25, 2019 AFL Women's draft
Rebecca Miller	Richmond	24 years, 181 days	1	Expansion signing, 2019
Sophie Molan	Richmond	18 years, 320 days	1	Pick 7, 2019 AFL Women's draft
Sarah Sansonetti	Richmond	18 years, 189 days	1	Pick 40, 2019 AFL Women's draft
Gabby Seymour	Richmond	23 years, 102 days	1	Rookie signing, 2019
Tayla Stahl	Richmond	25 years, 32 days	1	Expansion signing, 2019
Courtney Wakefield	Richmond	32 years, 315 days	1	Expansion signing, 2019
Alana Woodward	Richmond	29 years, 209 days	1	Expansion signing, 2019
Joanne Doonan	Carlton	25 years, 218 days	1	Rookie signing, 2019
Grace Egan	Carlton	19 years, 251 days	1	Pick 13, 2019 AFL Women's draft
Vaomua Laloifi	Carlton	26 years, 198 days	1	Pick 52, 2019 AFL Women's draft
Lucy McEvoy	Carlton	18 years, 270 days	1	Pick 2, 2019 AFL Women's draft
Annalyse Lister	Greater Western Sydney	29 years, 288 days	1	Pick 29, 2019 AFL Women's draft
Lauren Ahrens	Gold Coast	28 years, 173 days	1	Expansion signing, 2019
Alexia Hamilton	Gold Coast	19 years, 112 days	1	Pick 38, 2019 AFL Women's draft
Cheyenne Hammond	Gold Coast	21 years, 194 days	1	Pick 57, 2019 AFL Women's draft
Dee Heslop	Gold Coast	18 years, 193 days	1	Pick 69, 2019 AFL Women's draft
Jordann Hickey	Gold Coast	25 years, 48 days	1	Expansion signing, 2019
Kalinda Howarth	Gold Coast	20 years, 190 days	1	Expansion signing, 2019
Jade Pregelj	Gold Coast	28 years, 170 days	1	Pick 86, 2019 AFL Women's draft
Molly Ritson	Gold Coast	20 years, 180 days	1	Expansion signing, 2019
Kate Surman	Gold Coast	28 years, 103 days	1	Expansion signing, 2019
Serene Watson	Gold Coast	18 years, 97 days	1	Pick 18, 2019 AFL Women's draft
Gabrielle Colvin	Melbourne	28 years, 344 days	1	Pick 77, 2019 AFL Women's draft
Sinead Goldrick	Melbourne	29 years, 282 days	1	Rookie signing, 2019
Casey Sherriff	Melbourne	21 years, 292 days	1	Injury replacement signing, 2018
Ellie Gavalas	North Melbourne	23 years, 320 days	1	Pick 10, 2019 AFL Women's draft
Aileen Gilroy	North Melbourne	26 years, 344 days	1	Rookie signing, 2019
Vivien Saad	North Melbourne	27 years, 230 days	1	Injury replacement signing, 2020
Sarah Wright	North Melbourne	25 years, 278 days	1	Pick 32, 2019 AFL Women's draft
Greta Bodey	Brisbane	24 years, 212 days	1	Rookie signing, 2019
Dakota Davidson	Brisbane	21 years, 39 days	1	Pick 60, 2019 AFL Women's draft
Belle Dawes	Brisbane	18 years, 273 days	1	Pick 15, 2019 AFL Women's draft
Maria Moloney	Brisbane	24 years, 316 days	1	Pick 75, 2019 AFL Women's draft
Orla O'Dwyer	Brisbane	21 years, 208 days	1	Rookie signing, 2019
Lily Postlethwaite	Brisbane	18 years, 102 days	1	Pick 3, 2019 AFL Women's draft
Cathy Svarc	Brisbane	28 years, 75 days	1	Pick 16, 2019 AFL Women's draft
Najwa Allen	Adelaide	25 years, 228 days	1	Pick 37, 2019 AFL Women's draft
Chelsea Biddell	Adelaide	21 years, 208 days	1	Pick 102, 2019 AFL Women's draft
Nicole Campbell	Adelaide	26 years, 19 days	1	Pick 46, 2019 AFL Women's draft
Rachelle Martin	Adelaide	20 years, 357 days	1	Injury replacement signing, 2020
Madison Newman	Adelaide	18 years, 126 days	1	Pick 100, 2019 AFL Women's draft
Jaimi Tabb	Adelaide	18 years, 364 days	1	Pick 53, 2019 AFL Women's draft
Alana Porter	Collingwood	19 years, 2 days	1	Pick 82, 2019 AFL Women's draft
Aishling Sheridan	Collingwood	23 years, 206 days	1	Rookie signing, 2019
Mikayla Bowen	West Coast	18 years, 298 days	1	Expansion signing, 2019
Hayley Bullas	West Coast	23 years, 139 days	1	Expansion signing, 2019
Imahra Cameron	West Coast	23 years, 31 days	1	Pick 19, 2019 AFL Women's draft
Ashton Hill	West Coast	24 years, 120 days	1	Expansion signing, 2019
Grace Kelly	West Coast	25 years, 297 days	1	Rookie signing, 2019
Niamh Kelly	West Coast	24 years, 163 days	1	Rookie signing, 2019
Sophie McDonald	West Coast	19 years, 187 days	1	Pick 39, 2019 AFL Women's draft
Chantella Perera	West Coast	33 years, 247 days	1	Pick 101, 2019 AFL Women's draft
Danika Pisconeri	West Coast	28 years, 231 days	1	Expansion signing, 2019
Tarnee Tester	West Coast	27 years, 18 days	1	Pick 56, 2019 AFL Women's draft
Rosie Dillon	St Kilda	23 years, 327 days	1	Pick 24, 2019 AFL Women's draft
Clara Fitzpatrick	St Kilda	29 years, 131 days	1	Rookie signing, 2019
Caitlin Greiser	St Kilda	20 years, 357 days	1	Expansion signing, 2019
Molly McDonald	St Kilda	18 years, 281 days	1	Expansion signing, 2019
Kelly O'Neill	St Kilda	28 years, 295 days	1	Expansion signing, 2019
Georgia Patrikios	St Kilda	18 years, 316 days	1	Pick 5, 2019 AFL Women's draft
Hannah Priest	St Kilda	27 years, 269 days	1	Pick 41, 2019 AFL Women's draft
Olivia Vesely	St Kilda	20 years, 65 days	1	Expansion signing, 2019
Nadia von Bertouch	St Kilda	24 years, 165 days	1	Free agency signing, 2019
Tarni White	St Kilda	19 years, 9 days	1	Pick 30, 2019 AFL Women's draft
Nicola Xenos	St Kilda	19 years, 338 days	1	Pick 27, 2019 AFL Women's draft
Elisabeth Georgostathis	Western Bulldogs	18 years, 115 days	1	Pick 9, 2019 AFL Women's draft
Katy Herron	Western Bulldogs	30 years, 211 days	1	Rookie signing, 2019
Gemma Lagioia	Western Bulldogs	18 years, 115 days	1	Pick 8, 2019 AFL Women's draft
Danielle Marshall	Western Bulldogs	28 years, 178 days	1	Rookie signing, 2019
Gabby Newton	Western Bulldogs	18 years, 162 days	1	Pick 1, 2019 AFL Women's draft
Janelle Cuthbertson	Fremantle	29 years, 159 days	1	Pick 81, 2019 AFL Women's draft
Kate Flood	Fremantle	27 years, 141 days	1	Rookie signing, 2019
Lindal Rohde	Fremantle	29 years, 141 days	1	Rookie signing, 2019
Roxy Roux	Fremantle	18 years, 91 days	1	Pick 12, 2019 AFL Women's draft
Jasmin Stewart	Fremantle	21 years, 97 days	1	Pick 4, 2018 AFL Women's draft
Mim Strom	Fremantle	18 years, 94 days	1	Pick 21, 2019 AFL Women's draft
Millie Brown	Geelong	19 years, 25 days	1	Pick 11, 2019 AFL Women's draft
Madisen Maguire	Geelong	23 years, 340 days	1	Pick 98, 2019 AFL Women's draft
Amy McDonald	Geelong	22 years, 2 days	1	Pick 80, 2019 AFL Women's draft
Amelia van Oosterwijck	Western Bulldogs	18 years, 98 days	2	Pick 62, 2019 AFL Women's draft
Niamh McEvoy	Melbourne	29 years, 135 days	2	Rookie signing, 2019
Abbey Green	North Melbourne	23 years, 24 days	2	Pick 79, 2019 AFL Women's draft
Lisa Steane	Greater Western Sydney	25 years, 25 days	2	Pick 23, 2019 AFL Women's draft
Ellie Hampson	Gold Coast	19 years, 7 days	2	Expansion signing, 2019
Grace Campbell	Richmond	24 years, 72 days	2	Expansion signing, 2019
Kate Orme	West Coast	30 years, 307 days	2	Pick 70, 2019 AFL Women's draft
Bianca Webb	Fremantle	18 years, 154 days	2	Pick 85, 2019 AFL Women's draft
Ebony O'Dea	Collingwood	21 years, 93 days	2	Pick 89, 2019 AFL Women's draft
Caitlin Gould	Adelaide	20 years, 212 days	2	Pick 68, 2019 AFL Women's draft
Isabella Shannon	St Kilda	18 years, 236 days	3	Expansion signing, 2019
Tamara Luke	St Kilda	31 years, 364 days	3	Pick 33, 2019 AFL Women's draft
Brooke Vernon	Carlton	18 years, 125 days	3	Pick 26, 2019 AFL Women's draft
Emily Bonser	West Coast	24 years, 119 days	3	Expansion signing, 2019
Ella Wood	Richmond	19 years, 9 days	3	Pick 31, 2019 AFL Women's draft
Jacqueline Parry	Melbourne	23 years, 231 days	4	Pick 54, 2019 AFL Women's draft
Mia King	North Melbourne	18 years, 299 days	4	Pick 49, 2019 AFL Women's draft
Britney Gutknecht	Western Bulldogs	18 years, 315 days	4	Pick 48, 2019 AFL Women's draft
Hannah Munyard	Western Bulldogs	18 years, 209 days	4	Free agency signing, 2019
Poppy Kelly	St Kilda	21 years, 82 days	4	Rookie signing, 2019
Britney Gutknecht	Western Bulldogs	18 years, 315 days	4	Pick 48, 2019 AFL Women's draft
Emma O'Driscoll	Fremantle	19 years, 314 days	4	Pick 51, 2019 AFL Women's draft
Montana McKinnon	Adelaide	18 years, 237 days	5	Pick 14, 2019 AFL Women's draft
Sarah Halvorsen	Greater Western Sydney	24 years, 207 days	5	Pick 61, 2019 AFL Women's draft
Kate Dempsey	Richmond	24 years, 348 days	5	Pick 84, 2019 AFL Women's draft (Academy selection)
Sammie Johnson	St Kilda	18 years, 315 days	5	Expansion signing, 2019
Brenna Tarrant	Melbourne	18 years, 126 days	5	Pick 72, 2019 AFL Women's draft
Lucy Bellinger	Brisbane	26 years, 129 days	6	Pick 20, 2019 AFL Women's draft
Nekaela Butler	Richmond	18 years, 284 days	6	Pick 55, 2019 AFL Women's draft
Ciara Fitzgerald	Richmond	18 years, 207 days	6	Pick 87, 2019 AFL Women's draft
Nell Morris-Dalton	Western Bulldogs	18 years, 345 days	6	Pick 6, 2019 AFL Women's draft
Sarah Garstone	Fremantle	20 years, 90 days	6	Pick 66, 2019 AFL Women's draft
Emily Goodsir	Greater Western Sydney	27 years, 272 days	6	Pick 76, 2019 AFL Women's draft
Mhicca Carter	West Coast	29 years, 358 days	6	Rookie signing, 2019
Taylor Smith	Gold Coast	20 years, 31 days	6	Expansion signing, 2019
Krstel Petrevski	Melbourne	18 years, 348 days	SF	Pick 78, 2019 AFL Women's draft
Tahlia Hickie	Brisbane	19 years, 244 days	SF	Pick 28, 2019 AFL Women's draft

== Change of AFL Women's club ==
Name	Club	Age at debut	Debut round	Former club(s)	Recruiting method
Laura Bailey	Richmond	27 years, 172 days	1	Western Bulldogs	Pick 71, 2019 AFL Women's draft
Christina Bernardi	Richmond	29 years, 245 days	1	Collingwood, Greater Western Sydney	Expansion signing, 2019
Katie Brennan	Richmond	27 years, 128 days	1	Western Bulldogs	Expansion signing, 2019
Hannah Burchell	Richmond	24 years, 347 days	1	Geelong	Expansion signing, 2019
Monique Conti	Richmond	20 years, 60 days	1	Western Bulldogs	Traded in 2019
Sabrina Frederick	Richmond	23 years, 85 days	1	Brisbane	Traded in 2019
Akec Makur Chuot	Richmond	27 years, 155 days	1	Fremantle	Expansion signing, 2019
Phoebe Monahan	Richmond	26 years, 219 days	1	Greater Western Sydney	Expansion signing, 2019
Lauren Tesoriero	Richmond	33 years, 121 days	1	Collingwood	Pick 96, 2019 AFL Women's draft
Holly Whitford	Richmond	20 years, 316 days	1	Collingwood	Pick 43, 2019 AFL Women's draft
Jessica Allan	Greater Western Sydney	20 years, 258 days	1	Collingwood	Traded in 2019
Lauren Bella	Gold Coast	19 years, 149 days	1	Brisbane	Expansion signing, 2019
Hannah Dunn	Gold Coast	28 years, 173 days	1	Greater Western Sydney	Pick 22, 2019 AFL Women's draft
Tiarna Ernst	Gold Coast	32 years, 15 days	1	Western Bulldogs	Expansion signing, 2019
Jasmyn Hewett	Gold Coast	26 years, 133 days	1	Adelaide	Expansion signing, 2019
Leah Kaslar	Gold Coast	34 years, 150 days	1	Brisbane	Expansion signing, 2019
Paige Parker	Gold Coast	24 years, 277 days	1	Brisbane	Expansion signing, 2019
Brittany Perry	Gold Coast	25 years, 336 days	1	Greater Western Sydney	Pick 42, 2019 AFL Women's draft
Sally Riley	Gold Coast	29 years, 239 days	1	Adelaide	Expansion signing, 2019
Jamie Stanton	Gold Coast	24 years, 93 days	1	Brisbane, North Melbourne	Expansion signing, 2019
Sam Virgo	Gold Coast	32 years, 353 days	1	Brisbane	Expansion signing, 2019
Jacqui Yorston	Gold Coast	19 years, 106 days	1	Brisbane	Expansion signing, 2019
Libby Birch	Melbourne	22 years, 67 days	1	Western Bulldogs	Traded in 2019
Tahni Nestor	North Melbourne	28 years, 342 days	1	Carlton	Pick 64, 2019 AFL Women's draft
Rheanne Lugg	Brisbane	29 years, 351 days	1	Adelaide	Free agency signing, 2019
Courtney Gum	Adelaide	38 years, 136 days	1	Carlton	Pick 83, 2019 AFL Women's draft
Brianna Davey	Collingwood	25 years, 27 days	1	Carlton	Traded in 2019
Ashlee Atkins	West Coast	26 years, 313 days	1	Fremantle	Expansion signing, 2019
Maddy Collier	West Coast	24 years, 148 days	1	Greater Western Sydney	Expansion signing, 2019
Beatrice Devlyn	West Coast	22 years, 1 days	1	Fremantle	Expansion signing, 2019
McKenzie Dowrick	West Coast	19 years, 339 days	1	Brisbane	Traded in 2019
Kellie Gibson	West Coast	23 years, 245 days	1	Adelaide, Fremantle	Expansion signing, 2019
Courtney Guard	West Coast	28 years, 136 days	1	Fremantle	Expansion signing, 2019
Dana Hooker	West Coast	29 years, 17 days	1	Fremantle	Expansion signing, 2019
Parris Laurie	West Coast	25 years, 62 days	1	Fremantle	Expansion signing, 2019
Talia Radan	West Coast	31 years, 276 days	1	Adelaide	Pick 92, 2019 AFL Women's draft
Belinda Smith	West Coast	24 years, 253 days	1	Fremantle	Expansion signing, 2019
Emma Swanson	West Coast	24 years, 347 days	1	Greater Western Sydney	Expansion signing, 2019
Alison Brown	St Kilda	22 years, 141 days	1	Carlton	Expansion signing, 2019
Nat Exon	St Kilda	27 years, 64 days	1	Carlton, Brisbane	Expansion signing, 2019
Tilly Lucas-Rodd	St Kilda	23 years, 297 days	1	Carlton	Free agency signing, 2019
Emma Mackie	St Kilda	35 years, 153 days	1	Western Bulldogs	Traded in 2019
Kate McCarthy	St Kilda	27 years, 108 days	1	Brisbane	Traded in 2019
Cat Phillips	St Kilda	28 years, 119 days	1	Melbourne	Expansion signing, 2019
Jess Sedunary	St Kilda	29 years, 91 days	1	Adelaide	Expansion signing, 2019
Kate Shierlaw	St Kilda	30 years, 346 days	1	Carlton	Expansion signing, 2019
Rhiannon Watt	St Kilda	32 years, 63 days	1	Carlton	Expansion signing, 2019
Claudia Whitfort	St Kilda	20 years, 193 days	1	Melbourne	Traded in 2019
Mia-Rae Clifford	Fremantle	33 years, 152 days	1	Geelong	Free agency signing, 2019
Alison Drennan	St Kilda	29 years, 17 days	2	North Melbourne	Expansion signing, 2019
Darcy Guttridge	St Kilda	20 years, 109 days	2	Collingwood	Expansion signing, 2019
Courteney Munn	St Kilda	21 years, 68 days	2	North Melbourne	Expansion signing, 2019
Tayla Thorn	Gold Coast	21 years, 267 days	3	Adelaide	Expansion signing, 2019
Cassie Davidson	West Coast	23 years, 146 days	4	Fremantle	Traded in 2019
Emily McGuire	West Coast	21 years, 48 days	4	Fremantle	Expansion signing, 2019
Ashleigh Guest	Western Bulldogs	29 years, 325 days	4	Greater Western Sydney, Melbourne	Traded in 2019
Tori Groves-Little	Gold Coast	19 years, 145 days	5	Brisbane	Expansion signing, 2019
Sarah Perkins	Melbourne	26 years, 226 days	5	Adelaide	Train-on list, 2020
Melissa Caulfield	West Coast	31 years, 284 days	5	Fremantle	Expansion signing, 2019
Iilish Ross	Richmond	20 years, 267 days	6	Collingwood	Expansion signing, 2019
