= List of Greater Western Sydney Giants players =

The Greater Western Sydney Giants joined the Australian Football League (AFL) in 2012. Greater Western Sydney's first game was played against the Sydney Swans at Stadium Australia in Sydney, New South Wales on 24 March 2012. Greater Western Sydney played in their first AFL finals series in 2016, making the preliminary final.

In April 2026, Toby Greene overtook former captain Callan Ward as the Giants games record holder when he played his 268th game.

== AFL players ==
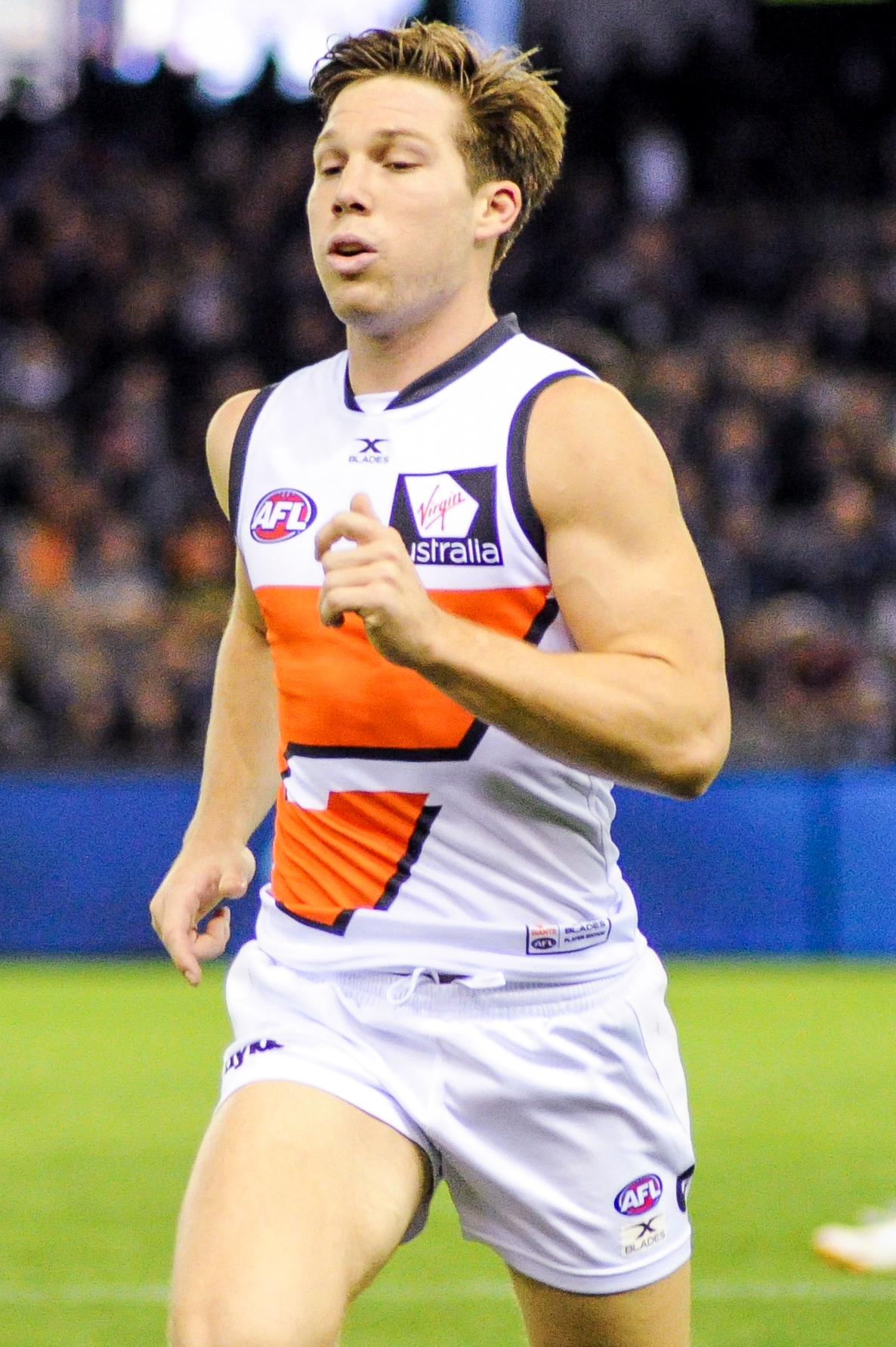
Toby Greene is a three-time All-Australian and the current games record holder.

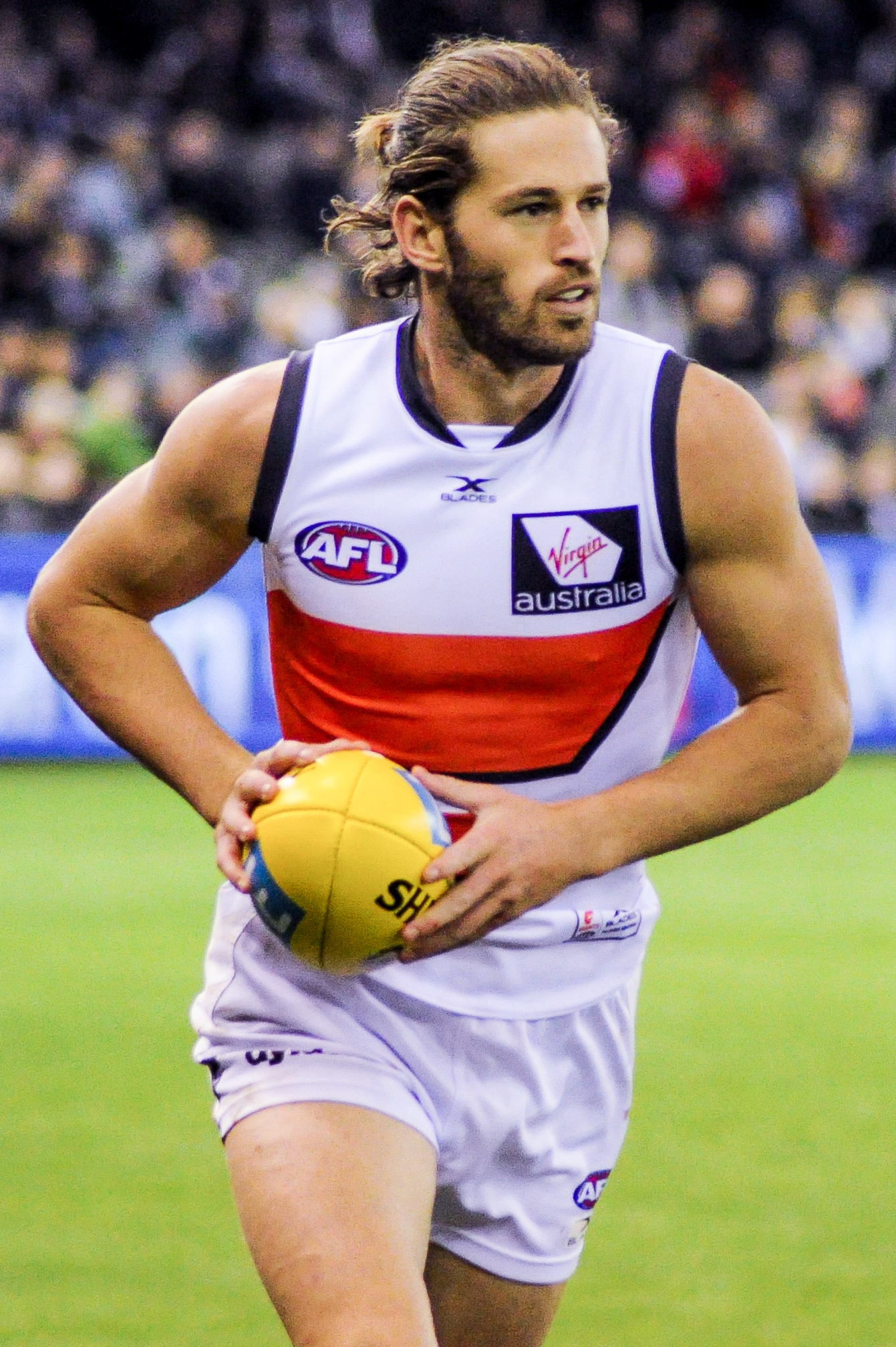
Callan Ward is a former captain of the club.

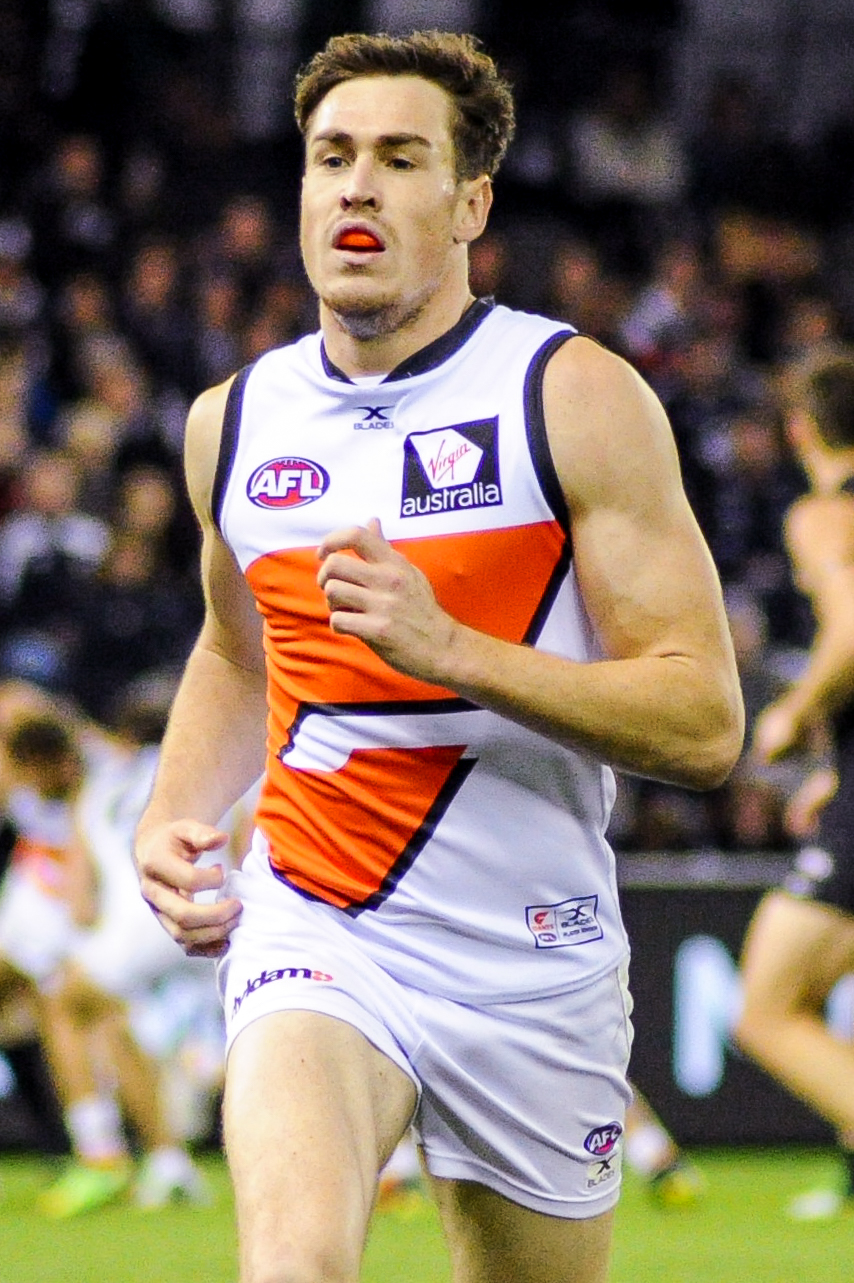
Jeremy Cameron is the club's all-time leading goalscorer and was the first Giants player to win the Coleman Medal.

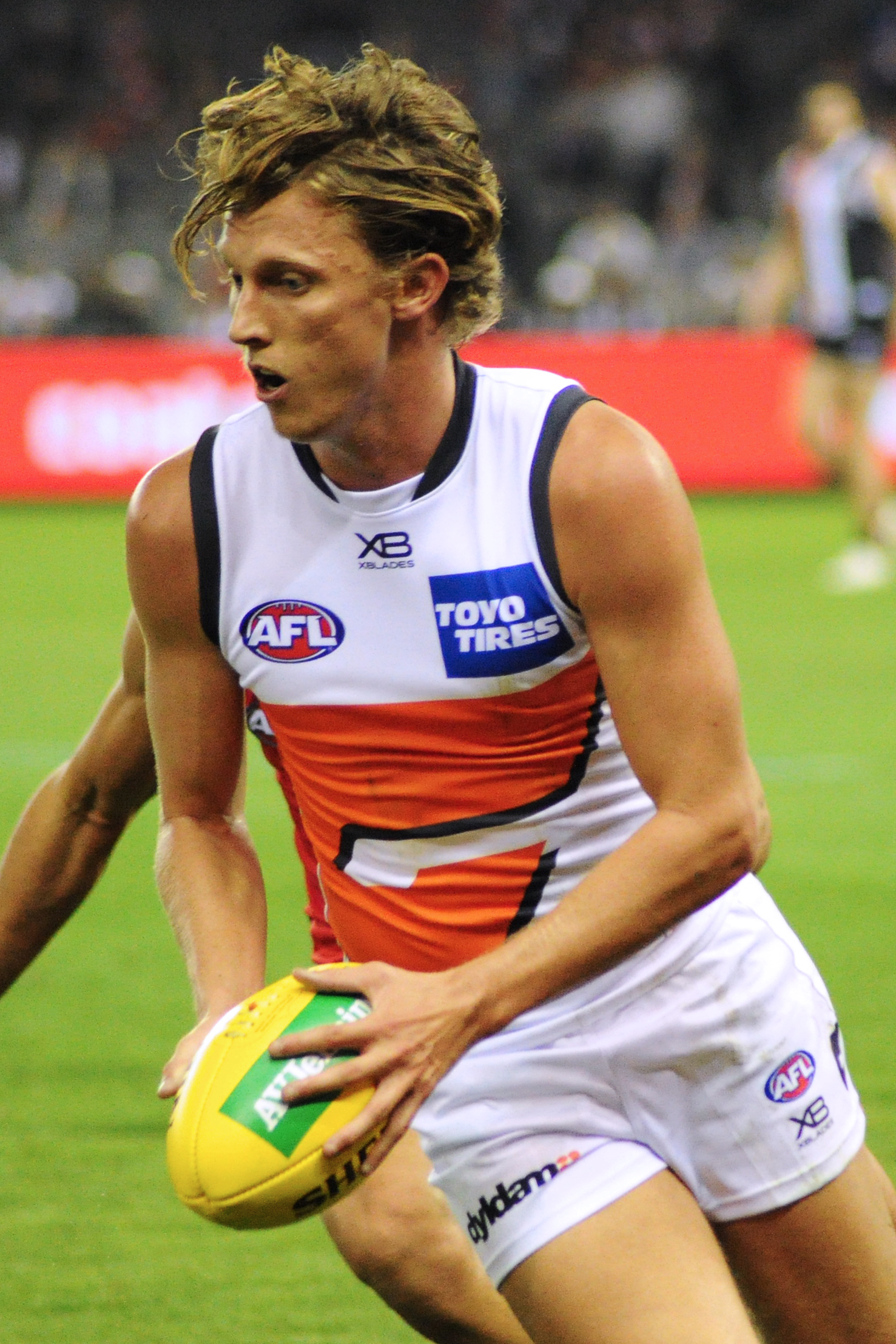
Lachie Whitfield is a two-time Kevin Sheedy Medallist.

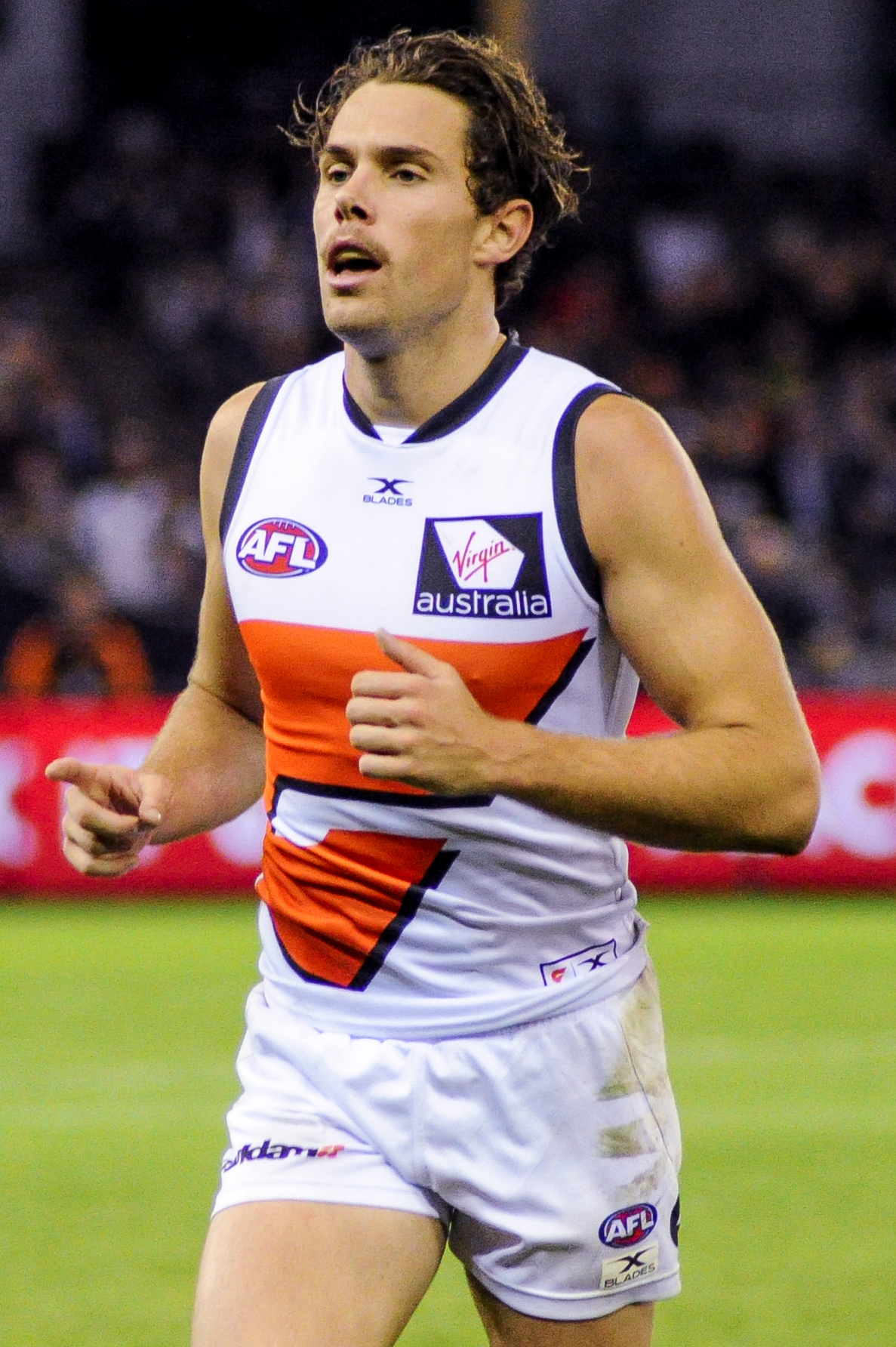
Josh Kelly is a two-time Kevin Sheedy Medallist.

Key
Order	Players are listed in order of debut
Seasons	Includes Greater Western Sydney only careers and spans from when a player was first listed with the club to their final year on the list
Debut	Debuts are for AFL regular season and finals series matches only
Games	Statistics are for AFL regular season and finals series matches only and are correct to the end of the 2026 season
Goals	Statistics are for AFL regular season and finals series matches only and are correct to the end of the 2026 season
†	Currently listed players

=== 2010s ===
Order	Name	Season(s)	Debut	Games	Goals
1	Tomas Bugg	2012–2015	round 1, 2012	65	16
2	Jeremy Cameron	2012–2020	round 1, 2012	171	427
3	Stephen Coniglio †	2012–	round 1, 2012	248	137
4	Chad Cornes	2012–2013	round 1, 2012	16	4
5	Phil Davis	2012–2022	round 1, 2012	174	6
6	Israel Folau	2012	round 1, 2012	13	2
7	Jonathan Giles	2012–2014	round 1, 2012	51	39
8	Toby Greene	2012–2026	round 1, 2012	282	450
9	Curtly Hampton	2012–2015	round 1, 2012	51	10
10	Jack Hombsch	2012	round 1, 2012	9	0
11	Will Hoskin-Elliott	2012–2016	round 1, 2012	52	42
12	Adam Kennedy	2012–2024	round 1, 2012	153	14
13	James McDonald	2012	round 1, 2012	13	4
14	Tim Mohr	2012–2018	round 1, 2012	48	1
15	Rhys Palmer	2012–2016	round 1, 2012	69	72
16	Dylan Shiel	2012–2018	round 1, 2012	135	64
17	Devon Smith	2012–2017	round 1, 2012	109	100
18	Adam Tomlinson	2012–2019	round 1, 2012	140	35
19	Jacob Townsend	2012–2015	round 1, 2012	28	4
20	Dom Tyson	2012–2013	round 1, 2012	13	4
21	Callan Ward	2012–2025	round 1, 2012	267	130
22	Nathan Wilson	2012–2017	round 1, 2012	77	16
23	Luke Power	2012	round 2, 2012	20	0
24	Tom Scully	2012–2018	round 2, 2012	121	67
25	Dean Brogan	2012–2013	round 3, 2012	19	3
26	Adam Treloar	2012–2015	round 3, 2012	79	48
27	Shaun Edwards	2012–2013	round 4, 2012	12	2
28	Anthony Miles	2012–2013	round 4, 2012	10	1
29	Taylor Adams	2012–2013	round 5, 2012	31	12
30	Josh Bruce	2012–2013	round 5, 2012	14	3
31	Sam Reid	2012–2013; 2016–2021	round 5, 2012	98	32
32	Setanta Ó hAilpín	2012–2013	round 6, 2012	8	15
33	Liam Sumner	2012–2015	round 6, 2012	12	9
34	Andrew Phillips	2012–2015	round 7, 2012	14	5
35	Matthew Buntine	2012–2019, 2021	round 8, 2012	67	4
36	Sam Darley	2012–2013	round 8, 2012	13	1
37	Nick Haynes	2012–2024	round 10, 2012	211	13
38	Jonathon Patton	2012–2019	round 12, 2012	89	130
39	Sam Schulz	2012–2015	round 12, 2012	1	1
40	Mark Whiley	2012–2014	round 12, 2012	12	2
41	Steve Clifton	2012	round 16, 2012	5	1
42	Kurt Aylett	2012–2013	round 17, 2012	1	0
43	Sam Frost	2012–2014	round 17, 2012	21	2
44	Gerald Ugle	2012–2013	round 17, 2012	3	1
45	Tim Golds	2012–2015	round 20, 2012	6	0
46	Rhys Cooyou	2012	round 22, 2012	1	1
47	Stephen Gilham	2013–2014	round 1, 2013	15	0
48	Lachie Plowman	2013–2015	round 1, 2013	20	1
49	Lachie Whitfield	2013–2026	round 1, 2013	278	72
50	Bret Thornton	2013	round 5, 2013	1	0
51	Zac Williams	2013–2020	round 5, 2013	113	27
52	Aidan Corr	20132020–	round 6, 2013	98	2
53	Jonathan O'Rourke	2013–2014	round 16, 2013	9	0
54	Tom Downie	2012–2017	round 20, 2013	9	2
55	Kristian Jaksch	2013–2014	round 22, 2013	7	2
56	James Stewart	2013–2016	round 23, 2013	18	18
57	Dylan Addison	2014–2015	round 1, 2014	5	0
58	Josh Hunt	2014	round 1, 2014	14	4
59	Shane Mumford	2014–2021	round 1, 2014	116	18
60	Heath Shaw	2014–2020	round 1, 2014	152	5
61	Josh Kelly †	2014–	round 2, 2014	230	144
62	Jed Lamb	2014–2015	round 4, 2014	10	8
63	Tom Boyd	2014	round 5, 2014	9	8
64	Rory Lobb	2014–2018	round 12, 2014	74	64
65	Cam McCarthy	2014–2016	round 23, 2014	21	36
66	Ryan Griffen	2015–2018	round 1, 2015	55	32
67	Joel Patfull	2015–2017	round 1, 2015	38	2
68	Caleb Marchbank	2015–2016	round 12, 2015	7	0
69	Jack Steele	2015–2016	round 12, 2015	17	9
70	Jake Barrett	2014–2016	round 23, 2015	1	0
71	Steve Johnson	2016–2017	round 1, 2016	40	64
72	Jacob Hopper	2016–2022	round 8, 2016	114	42
73	Matthew Kennedy	2016–2017	round 13, 2016	19	7
74	Harrison Himmelberg †	2016–	round 17, 2016	224	166
75	Tendai Mzungu	2017	round 1, 2017	4	1
76	Tim Taranto	2017–2022	round 1, 2017	114	48
77	Daniel Lloyd	2017–2023	round 8, 2017	101	75
78	Matt de Boer	2017–2022	round 9, 2017	85	35
79	Harry Perryman	2017–2024	round 9, 2017	129	28
80	Jeremy Finlayson	2017–2021	round 15, 2017	66	90
81	Will Setterfield	2017–2018	round 18, 2017	2	0
82	Dawson Simpson	2017–2019	round 19, 2017	20	1
83	Brett Deledio	2017–2019	round 20, 2017	32	15
84	Zac Langdon	2018–2020	round 1, 2018	31	23
85	Nick Shipley	2018–2021	round 6, 2018	6	0
86	Dylan Buckley	2018	round 7, 2018	2	2
87	Lachlan Keefe	2018–2025	round 7, 2018	79	13
88	Isaac Cumming	2018–2024	round 8, 2018	81	10
89	Sam Taylor †	2018–	round 11, 2018	143	2
90	Brent Daniels †	2018–	round 16, 2018	122	83
91	Aiden Bonar	2018–2019	round 20, 2018	6	5
92	Tom Sheridan	2019–2020	round 3, 2019	2	0
92	Jackson Hately	2019–2020	round 5, 2019	13	2
94	Jake Stein	2019–2022	round 13, 2019	20	1
95	Bobby Hill	2019–2022	round 17, 2019	41	34
96	Connor Idun †	2019–	round 20, 2019	140	0
97	Jye Caldwell	2019–2020	round 21, 2019	11	1
98	Zach Sproule	2019–2022	round 22, 2019	17	13

== 2020s ==
Order	Name	Season(s)	Debut	Games	Goals
99	Tom Green †	2020–	round 1, 2020	115	49
100	Sam Jacobs	2020	round 1, 2020	7	2
101	Lachlan Ash †	2020–	round 3, 2020	148	9
102	Xavier O'Halloran †	2020–	round 10, 2020	104	38
103	Tom Hutchesson	2020	round 12, 2020	1	0
104	Jake Riccardi †	2020–	round 13, 2020	98	124
105	Jack Buckley †	2020–	round 17, 2020	94	1
106	Tanner Bruhn	2021–2022	round 1, 2021	30	11
107	Matt Flynn	2021–2023	round 1, 2021	33	10
108	Conor Stone	2021–2026	round 4, 2021	30	8
109	Jesse Hogan	2021–2026	round 7, 2021	100	239
110	Kieren Briggs	2021–2026	round 9, 2021	88	16
111	Callum Brown †	2021–	round 11, 2021	82	89
112	James Peatling	2021–2024	round 20, 2021	45	16
113	Jarrod Brander	2022	round 1, 2022	5	4
114	Braydon Preuss	2022–2024	round 3, 2022	10	2
115	Finn Callaghan †	2022–	round 5, 2022	90	21
116	Cooper Hamilton	2022–2024	round 7, 2022	8	1
117	Jacob Wehr	2022–2025	round 10, 2022	39	7
118	Ryan Angwin †	2022–	round 14, 2022	50	10
119	Leek Aleer †	2022–	round 20, 2022	32	2
120	Harry Rowston †	2023–	round 2, 2023	29	12
121	Aaron Cadman †	2023–	round 5, 2023	77	113
122	Toby Bedford †	2023–	round 7, 2023	82	50
123	Cameron Fleeton	2023	round 9, 2023	2	0
124	Josh Fahey	2023–2025	round 11, 2023	7	4
125	Toby McMullin †	2023–	round 22, 2023	36	8
126	Harvey Thomas †	2024–	round 0, 2024	62	27
127	Darcy Jones †	2024–	round 7, 2024	37	31
128	Max Gruzewski †	2024–	round 15, 2024	26	33
129	Joe Fonti †	2024–	round 17, 2024	44	2
130	James Leake †	2025–	round 0, 2025	8	1
131	Jake Stringer	2025–2026	round 3, 2025	38	73
132	Josaia Delana †	2025–	round 8, 2025	12	1
133	Cody Angove †	2025–	round 9, 2025	5	2
134	Nicholas Madden †	2025–	round 13, 2025	12	1
135	Phoenix Gothard †	2026–	round 0, 2026	16	18
136	Jayden Laverde †	2026–	round 0, 2026	19	0
137	Clayton Oliver †	2026–	round 0, 2026	23	4
138	Oliver Hannaford †	2026–	round 3, 2026	5	2
139	Harrison Oliver †	2026–	round 10, 2026	5	1
140	Riley Hamilton †	2026–	round 17, 2026	8	5
141	Jack Ough †	2026–	round 17, 2026	5	1

== AFL Women's players ==
Key
Order	Players are listed in order of debut
Seasons	Includes Greater Western Sydney only careers and spans from when a player was first listed with the club to their final year on the list
Debut	Debuts are for AFL regular season and finals series matches only
Games	Statistics are for AFL regular season and finals series matches only and are correct to round 9, 2025
Goals	Statistics are for AFL regular season and finals series matches only and are correct to round 9, 2025
^{^}	Currently listed players

Order	Name	Season(s)	Debut	Games	Goals
1	Rebecca Beeson^	2017–	round 1, 2017	70	13
2	Jacinda Barclay	2017–2020	round 1, 2017	23	11
3	Nicola Barr	2017–2024	round 1, 2017	61	10
4	Jessica Bibby	2017	round 1, 2017	7	0
5	Codie Briggs	2017	round 1, 2017	3	0
6	Maddy Collier	2017–2019	round 1, 2017	15	0
7	Jess Dal Pos	2017–2021	round 1, 2017	37	5
8	Kristy De Pellegrini	2017	round 1, 2017	6	0
9	Hannah Dunn	2017	round 1, 2017	1	0
10	Amanda Farrugia	2017–2019	round 1, 2017	21	2
11	Ashleigh Guest	2017	round 1, 2017	7	0
12	Clare Lawton	2017	round 1, 2017	7	0
13	Erin McKinnon	2017–2022 (S7)	round 1, 2017	41	1
14	Phoebe McWilliams	2017–2018	round 1, 2017	14	14
15	Ella Ross	2017	round 1, 2017	7	0
16	Alex Saundry	2017–2018	round 1, 2017	4	0
17	Aimee Schmidt	2017–2021	round 1, 2017	23	10
18	Kate Stanton	2017	round 1, 2017	4	1
19	Renee Tomkins	2017–2019	round 1, 2017	12	0
20	Britt Tully	2017–2021	round 1, 2017	29	4
21	Hannah Wallett	2017	round 1, 2017	4	1
22	Alex Williams	2017	round 1, 2017	7	0
23	Ellie Brush	2017–2020	round 2, 2017	20	1
24	Mai Nguyen	2017	round 2, 2017	3	1
25	Stephanie Walker	2017	round 1, 2017	3	1
26	Emma Swanson	2017–2019	round 3, 2017	13	0
27	Louise Stephenson	2017–2022 (S7)	round 5, 2017	33	4
28	Isabella Rudolph	2017	round 7, 2017	1	0
29	Elle Bennetts	2018–2021	round 1, 2018	30	2
30	Maddie Boyd	2018	round 1, 2018	2	0
31	Alicia Eva^	2018–	round 1, 2018	71	13
32	Renee Forth	2018	round 1, 2018	5	0
33	Courtney Gum	2018–2019	round 1, 2018	14	5
34	Tanya Hetherington	2018–2022 (S7)	round 1, 2018	46	0
35	Jodie Hicks	2018–2023	round 1, 2018	40	5
36	Rebecca Privitelli	2018–2022 (S6)	round 1, 2018	23	14
37	Pepa Randall	2018–2024	round 1, 2018	62	0
38	Cora Staunton	2018–2022 (S7)	round 1, 2018	50	55
39	Phoebe Monahan	2018–2019	round 2, 2018	10	0
40	Philippa Smyth	2018	round 4, 2018	1	0
41	Christina Bernardi	2019	round 1, 2019	7	7
42	Yvonne Bonner	2019–2021	round 1, 2019	11	7
43	Alyce Parker^	2019–	round 1, 2019	61	9
44	Haneen Zreika^	2019–	round 1, 2019	58	10
45	Brittany Perry	2019	round 2, 2019	4	0
46	Tait Mackrill	2019–2023	round 3, 2019	22	5
47	Taylah Davies	2019–2021	round 4, 2019	9	2
48	Ingrid Nielsen	2019–2020	round 4, 2019	7	0
49	Lisa Whiteley	2019–2020	round 6, 2019	2	0
50	Delma Gisu	2019	round 7, 2019	1	0
51	Jess Allan	2020–2022 (S7)	round 1, 2020	14	0
52	Annalyse Lister	2020–2023	round 1, 2020	37	1
53	Lisa Steane	2020–2022 (S6)	round 2, 2020	19	0
54	Sarah Halvorsen	2020–2021	round 5, 2020	4	1
55	Emily Goodsir	2020–2022 (S7)	round 6, 2020	15	0
56	Tarni Evans^	2021–	round 1, 2021	48	20
57	Erin Lorenzini	2021–2022 (S6)	round 1, 2021	7	0
58	Georgia Garnett^	2021–	round 3, 2021	53	24
59	Katherine Smith^	2021–	round 5, 2021	54	4
60	Libby Graham	2021–2022 (S6)	round 6, 2021	6	0
61	Ally Dallaway	2022 (S6)–2023	round 1, 2022 (S6)	30	0
62	Chloe Dalton	2022 (S6)–2024	round 1, 2022 (S6)	16	3
63	Katie Loynes	2022 (S6)	round 1, 2022 (S6)	9	2
64	Ally Morphett	2022 (S6)	round 1, 2022 (S6)	7	0
65	Bríd Stack	2022 (S6)–(S7)	round 1, 2022 (S6)	19	1
66	Emily Pease^	2022 (S6)–	round 2, 2022 (S6)	44	6
67	Jessica Doyle^	2022 (S6)–	round 3, 2022 (S6)	39	13
68	Georgina Fowler	2022 (S6)–(S7)	round 4, 2022 (S6)	3	0
69	Jasmine Grierson	2022 (S6)–2024	round 4, 2022 (S6)	29	0
70	Casidhe Simmons	2022 (S6)–(S7)	round 4, 2022 (S6)	2	0
71	Brodee Mowbray^	2022 (S6)–	round 4, 2022 (S6)	37	12
72	Madison Brazendale^	2022 (S7)–	round 1, 2022 (S7)	33	4
73	Cambridge McCormick^	2022 (S7)–	round 1, 2022 (S7)	32	0
74	Meghan Gaffney	2022 (S7)–2025	round 3, 2022 (S7)	16	0
75	Zarlie Goldsworthy^	2022 (S7)–	round 3, 2022 (S7)	38	32
76	Grace Hill	2022 (S7)–2023	round 6, 2022 (S7)	9	0
77	Tess Cattle	2022 (S7)–2023	round 10, 2022 (S7)	1	0
78	Fleur Davies^	2023–	round 1, 2023	18	1
79	Teagan Germech	2023	round 1, 2023	7	0
80	Caitlin Miller	2023–2024	round 2, 2023	6	1
81	Isabel Huntington^	2023–	round 3, 2023	26	5
82	Rene Caris	2023	round 6, 2023	5	1
83	Isadora McLeay	2023	round 7, 2023	3	0
84	Eilish O'Dowd^	2024–	round 1, 2024	20	9
85	Mikayla Pauga^	2024–	round 1, 2024	18	1
86	Claire Ransom^	2024–	round 1, 2024	10	0
87	Kaitlyn Srhoj^	2024–	round 1, 2024	17	2
88	Caitlin Miller	2024	round 2, 2024	6	1
89	Courtney Murphy	2024	round 2, 2024	1	0
90	Aliesha Newman^	2024–	round 4, 2024	7	2
91	Annise Bradfield	2024	round 5, 2024	3	0
92	Jemma Ramsdale	2024	round 7, 2024	3	0
93	Indigo Linde^	2024–	round 10, 2024	7	0
94	Eleanor Brown^	2025–	round 1, 2025	7	0
95	Caitlin Fletcher^	2025–	round 1, 2025	1	0
96	Sara Howley^	2025–	round 1, 2025	9	1
97	Sophie Kavanagh^	2025–	round 1, 2025	4	0
98	Grace Kos^	2025–	round 1, 2025	5	0
99	Grace Martin^	2025–	round 1, 2025	9	0
100	Taylah Levy^	2025–	round 2, 2025	8	3
101	Daisy Walker^	2025–	round 3, 2025	7	0
102	Vivien Saad	2025	round 11, 2025	1	0

== Other players ==
=== Currently listed players yet to make their debut for GWS ===
Player	Date of birth	Acquired	Recruited from	Listed	
Player	Date of birth	Acquired	Recruited from	Rookie	Senior
Finnegan Davis	January 21, 2007	No. 51, 2025 national draft	Western Jets	—N/a	2026–
Oskar Taylor	August 1, 2007	No. 15, 2025 national draft	Eastern Ranges	—N/a	2026–
Logan Smith	September 26, 2006	No. 71, 2024 national draft	Queanbeyan	—N/a	2025–
Nathan Wardius	October 12, 2004	2023 Category B rookie selection	Rand-Walbundrie-Walla	2024–	—N/a

=== Listed players who did not play a senior game for GWS ===
Player	Date of birth	Draft details	Recruited from	Listed		Ref.
Player	Date of birth	Draft details	Recruited from	Rookie	Senior	Ref.
Tim Segrave	3 February 1992	2011 NSW–ACT zone selection	Murray Bushrangers	2012	—N/a	
Josh Growden	3 February 1992	17-year-old access selection	Woodville-West Torrens	—N/a	2012–2013	
Joe Redfern	18 November 1994	No. 51, 2013 rookie draft	Sydney Hills Eagles	2013	—N/a	
Jarrod Pickett	18 August 1996	No. 4, 2014 national draft	South Fremantle	—N/a	2015–2016	
Pat McKenna	12 August 1996	No. 23, 2014 national draft	Gisborne	—N/a	2015–2016	
Lachlan Tiziani	13 March 1997	No. 54, 2016 national draft	Murray Bushrangers	—N/a	2017–	
Will Shaw	14 June 2001	Category B rookie selection	Bendigo Pioneers	2021–2023	—N/a	
Jason Gillbee	15 May 2004	Category B rookie selection	Bendigo Pioneers	2023	—N/a	
Wade Derksen	June 18, 2001	No. 5, 2022 mid-season rookie draft	Peel Thunder	2022–2025	—N/a	

== See also ==
- List of Greater Western Sydney Football Club coaches
