= 2019 AFL Women's draft =

Seventh women's draft organised by the Australian Football League

General information
- Date: 22 October 2019
- Time: 11:00am AEDT
- Location: Victoria Pavilion, Melbourne Showgrounds
- Network: afl.com.au
- Sponsored by: National Australia Bank

Overview
- League: AFL Women's
- First selection: Gabby Newton (Western Bulldogs)

The 2019 AFL Women's draft consisted of the various periods when the 14 clubs in the AFL Women's competition can recruit players prior to the competition's 2020 season.

At the conclusion of the period clubs were required to have 27 senior-listed and three rookie-listed players.

== Expansion club signing period ==
=== First period ===
Prior to the completion of the 2019 season, future expansion clubs Gold Coast, Richmond, St Kilda and West Coast were permitted to pre-list up to 10 players from their women's academies or designated development zones. A maximum of seven of these players could be open-age signings who had nominated for the 2018 AFL Women's draft but not been selected. A final three spots were reserved for three junior players of minimum draft age (born in 2001) and who hailed from the clubs' designated development regions.

Table of pre-list signings
Date	Player	Club	Recruited from		Classification	Ref
Date	Player	Club	Club	League	Classification	Ref
29 January	Mikayla Bowen	West Coast	Swan Districts	WAWFL	Junior	
29 January	Rosie Deegan	West Coast	—	—	Junior	
29 January	Alison Brown	St Kilda	Southern Saints	VFL Women's	Open-age	
5 February	Molly McDonald	St Kilda	Dandenong Stingrays	NAB League	Junior	
11 February	Charlotte Hammans	Gold Coast	Bond University	QAFLW	Junior	
11 February	Ellie Hampson	Gold Coast	Hermit Park	AFL Townsville	Junior	
11 February	Kitara Farrar	Gold Coast	South Cairns	AFL Cairns	Junior	
19 February	Isabella Shannon	St Kilda	Dandenong Stingrays	NAB League	Junior	
16 May	Courtney Wakefield	Richmond	Richmond	VFL Women's	Open-age	
21 May	Tayla Stahl	Richmond	Richmond	VFL Women's	Open-age	
24 May	Maddy Roberts	Gold Coast	Coolangatta	QAFLW	Open-age	
12 June	Lauren Ahrens	Gold Coast	Essendon	VFL Women's	Open-age	
18 June	Molly Ritson	Gold Coast	Bond University	QAFLW	Open-age	
20 June	Alice Edmonds	Richmond	Richmond	VFL Women's	Open-age	
23 July	Grace Campbell	Richmond	Richmond	VFL Women's	Open-age	
23 July	Akec Makur Chuot	Richmond	Richmond	VFL Women's	Open-age	
23 July	Rebecca Miller	Richmond	Richmond	VFL Women's	Open-age	
24 July	Kate Surman	Gold Coast	Maroochydore	QAFLW	Open-age	
6 August	Tayla Thorn	Gold Coast	NT Thunder	VFL Women's	Open-age	
9 August	Kate Shierlaw	St Kilda	Southern Saints	VFL Women's	Open-age	
13 August	Olivia Vesely	St Kilda	Southern Saints	VFL Women's	Open-age	
16 August	Kodi Jacques	Richmond	Richmond	VFL Women's	Open-age	
27 August	Emily Bonser	West Coast	Claremont	WAWFL	Open-age	
27 August	Beatrice Devlyn	West Coast	Subiaco	WAWFL	Open-age	
27 August	Hayley Bullas	West Coast	Essendon	VFL Women's	Open-age	
27 August	Ashton Hill	West Coast	East Fremantle	WAWFL	Open-age	
27 August	Danika Pisconeri	West Coast	Subiaco	WAWFL	Open-age	
27 August	Emily McGuire	West Coast	Swan Districts	WAWFL	Open-age	
28 August	Kalinda Howarth	Gold Coast	Bond University	QAFLW	Open-age	
29 August	Caitlin Greiser	St Kilda	Southern Saints	VFL Women's	Open-age	
29 August	Sammie Johnson	St Kilda	Southern Saints	VFL Women's	Open-age	
30 August	Taylor Smith	Gold Coast	Bond University	QAFLW	Open-age	
25 September	Kelly O'Neill	St Kilda	Southern Saints	VFL Women's	Open-age	

=== Second period ===
From 8 April expansion clubs Gold Coast, Richmond, St Kilda and West Coast will have an 11-day window until 18 April to sign players who played for existing clubs during the 2019 season. These clubs can sign a maximum of 12 players each through this mechanism. All existing clubs other than Brisbane and Fremantle could lose no more than four players to the mechanism while Brisbane and Fremantle can each lose a maximum of eight due to the entry of Gold Coast and West Coast into their previously exclusive state-zones. No compensation will be offered to those clubs losing players under this process, but the player's existing club are permitted to negotiate to re-sign the player. Players can be signed under this mechanism to one or two year contracts.

Table of expansion club signings
Date	Player	Former club	New club	Ref
8 April	Jamie Stanton	North Melbourne	Gold Coast	
9 April	Katie Brennan	Western Bulldogs	Richmond	
9 April	Alison Drennan	North Melbourne	St Kilda	
9 April	Tori Groves-Little	Brisbane	Gold Coast	
10 April	Darcy Guttridge	Collingwood	St Kilda	
10 April	Dana Hooker	Fremantle	West Coast	
12 April	Ashlee Atkins	Fremantle	West Coast	
12 April	Melissa Caulfield	Fremantle	West Coast	
12 April	Brianna Green	Fremantle	West Coast	
12 April	Courtney Guard	Fremantle	West Coast	
12 April	Emma Swanson	Greater Western Sydney	West Coast	
12 April	Maddy Brancatisano	Melbourne	Richmond	
12 April	Phoebe Monahan	Greater Western Sydney	Richmond	
12 April	Iilish Ross	Collingwood	Richmond	
12 April	Paige Parker	Brisbane	Gold Coast	
12 April	Rhiannon Watt	Carlton	St Kilda	
15 April	Christina Bernardi	Greater Western Sydney	Richmond	
15 April	Selena Karlson	Western Bulldogs	St Kilda	
15 April	Tiarna Ernst	Western Bulldogs	Gold Coast	
15 April	Sam Virgo	Brisbane	Gold Coast	
15 April	Jacqui Yorston	Brisbane	Gold Coast	
16 April	Lauren Bella	Brisbane	Gold Coast	
16 April	Leah Kaslar	Brisbane	Gold Coast	
16 April	Emma Pittman	Brisbane	Gold Coast	
16 April	Maddy Collier	Greater Western Sydney	West Coast	
16 April	Parris Laurie	Fremantle	West Coast	
16 April	Belinda Smith	Western Bulldogs	West Coast	
17 April	Kellie Gibson	Fremantle	West Coast	
17 April	Alicia Janz	Fremantle	West Coast	
17 April	Nat Exon	Brisbane	St Kilda	
18 April	Cat Phillips	Melbourne	St Kilda	
18 April	Jess Sedunary	Adelaide	St Kilda	
18 April	Courteney Munn	North Melbourne	St Kilda	
18 April	Jasmyn Hewett	Adelaide	Gold Coast	

== Signing and trading period ==
Concurrently to the expansion club signing period, all 14 clubs were able to sign and trade players. Players can be signed during this period are eligible for one or two year contracts. A second stage to the trade period will open from 23 April and run until 26 April, with only the 10 established clubs able to take part.

=== Trades ===
Table of trades
Clubs involved	Trade		Ref
Brisbane Richmond	to Brisbane (from Richmond): pick #12	to Richmond (from Brisbane): Sabrina Frederick	
Brisbane St Kilda	to Brisbane (from St Kilda): pick #11	to St Kilda (from Brisbane): Kate McCarthy	
Brisbane West Coast	to Brisbane (from West Coast): pick #13	to West Coast (from Brisbane): McKenzie Dowrick	
Adelaide Greater Western Sydney	to Adelaide (from Greater Western Sydney): pick #46	to Greater Western Sydney (from Adelaide): Jessica Allan	
Richmond Western Bulldogs	to Western Bulldogs (from Richmond): pick #1	to Richmond (from Western Bulldogs): Monique Conti	
Carlton Collingwood	to Carlton (from Collingwood): pick #2; pick #26; pick #44; pick #59	to Collingwood (from Carlton): Brianna Davey; pick #67; pick #82	
West Coast Western Bulldogs	to Western Bulldogs (from West Coast): pick #90	to West Coast (from Western Bulldogs): Kate Bartlett	
Fremantle West Coast	to Fremantle (from West Coast): pick #86	to West Coast (from Fremantle): Cassie Davidson	
Melbourne Western Bulldogs	to Western Bulldogs (from Melbourne): Ashleigh Guest; pick #8; pick #48	to Melbourne (from Western Bulldogs): Libby Birch; pick #77	
St Kilda Western Bulldogs	to Western Bulldogs (from St Kilda): pick #9	to St Kilda (from Western Bulldogs): Emma Mackie; pick #24; pick #30	
Melbourne St Kilda	to Melbourne (from St Kilda): pick #54; pick #72	to St Kilda (from Melbourne): Claudia Whitfort; pick #63	

=== Retirements and delistings ===
Table of player retirements and delistings
Date	Name	Club	Status	Ref
15 March	Cecilia McIntosh	Collingwood	Retired	
15 March	Courtney Gum	Greater Western Sydney	Retired	
28 March	Erin Hoare	Geelong	Retired	
29 March	Bella Ayre	Brisbane	Retired	
8 April	Moana Hope	North Melbourne	Delisted	
12 April	Shae Audley	Carlton	Delisted	
12 April	Kirby Bentley	Carlton	Delisted	
12 April	Reni Hicks	Carlton	Delisted	
12 April	Bridie Kennedy	Carlton	Delisted	
17 April	Ruby Blair	Brisbane	Retired	
17 April	Megan Hunt	Brisbane	Delisted	
17 April	Krystal Scott	Brisbane	Delisted	
18 April	Rheanne Lugg	Adelaide	Delisted	
18 April	Sally Riley	Adelaide	Delisted	
18 April	Katelyn Rosenzweig	Adelaide	Delisted	
18 April	Sarah Perkins	Adelaide	Delisted	
18 April	Jenna McCormick	Adelaide	Retired	
18 April	Delma Gisu	Greater Western Sydney	Delisted	
18 April	Tait Mackrill	Greater Western Sydney	Delisted	
18 April	Ebony O'Dea	Greater Western Sydney	Delisted	
18 April	Brittany Perry	Greater Western Sydney	Delisted	
18 April	Renee Tomkins	Greater Western Sydney	Delisted	
18 April	Lisa Whiteley	Greater Western Sydney	Delisted	
18 April	Georgia Nanscawen	North Melbourne	Delisted	
18 April	Maddison Smith	North Melbourne	Delisted	
18 April	Jessie Williams	North Melbourne	Delisted	
24 April	Tessa Boyd	Western Bulldogs	Delisted	
24 April	Jessie Davies	Western Bulldogs	Delisted	
25 April	Tilly Lucas-Rodd	Carlton	Delisted	
25 April	Courtney Webb	Carlton	Delisted	
25 April	Amelia Mullane	Carlton	Retired	
26 April	Nicole Hildebrand	Collingwood	Delisted	
26 April	Melissa Kuys	Collingwood	Delisted	
26 April	Jordan Membrey	Collingwood	Delisted	
26 April	Georgie Parker	Collingwood	Delisted	
26 April	Holly Whitford	Collingwood	Delisted	
26 April	Ebony Dowson	Fremantle	Delisted	
26 April	Tayla McAuliffe	Fremantle	Delisted	
26 April	Brianna Moyes	Fremantle	Delisted	
26 April	Hannah Burchell	Geelong	Delisted	
26 April	Mia-Rae Clifford	Geelong	Delisted	
26 April	Elise Coventry	Geelong	Delisted	
26 April	Maighan Fogas	Geelong	Delisted	
26 April	Hayley Trevean	Geelong	Delisted	
26 April	Jordann Hickey	Melbourne	Delisted	
26 April	Brooke Patterson	Melbourne	Delisted	
26 April	Talia Radan	Melbourne	Delisted	
26 April	Ashleigh Woodland	Melbourne	Delisted	
29 August	Hayley Wildes	Western Bulldogs	Retired	
24 November	Amanda Farrugia	Greater Western Sydney	Retired	

=== Free agency ===
A free agency period was held between the end of the trading and signing period on April 26 and until April 30 in which clubs were permitted to sign delisted or uncontracted players. At the conclusion of the period, clubs are permitted to have retained no more than 22 senior players and two rookies. Team lists matching those requirements must be submitted on May 3.

Table of free agency signings
Date	Player	Former club	New club	Ref
30 April	Hannah Burchell	Geelong	Richmond	
30 April	Mia-Rae Clifford	Geelong	Fremantle	
30 April	Melissa Kuys	Collingwood	St Kilda	
30 April	Tilly Lucas-Rodd	Carlton	St Kilda	
30 April	Rheanne Lugg	Adelaide	Brisbane	
30 April	Jordann Hickey	Melbourne	Gold Coast	
30 April	Sally Riley	Adelaide	Gold Coast	

=== Rookie signings ===
In the absence of a rookie draft, each club was required to sign two rookie players, either new or retained from their rookie list the year prior. New players to this list must not have played Australian rules football within the previous three years or been involved in an AFLW high-performance program.

Table of rookie signings
Club	Player	Other/former sport	Ref
Brisbane	Orla O'Dwyer	Gaelic football	
Brisbane	Greta Bodey	Soccer	
Carlton	Joanne Doonan	Gaelic football	
Carlton	Katie Harrison	Rugby sevens	
Collingwood	Aishling Sheridan	Gaelic football	
Fremantle	Kate Flood	Gaelic football	
Fremantle	Aine Tighe	Gaelic football	
Fremantle	Lindal Rohde	Netball	
Melbourne	Sinéad Goldrick	Gaelic football	
Melbourne	Niamh McEvoy	Gaelic football	
North Melbourne	Mairead Seoighe	Gaelic football	
North Melbourne	Aileen Gilroy	Gaelic football	
Richmond	Gabby Seymour	Volleyball	
St Kilda	Clara Fitzpatrick	Gaelic football	
St Kilda	Poppy Kelly	Basketball	
West Coast	Grace Kelly	Gaelic football	
West Coast	Niamh Kelly	Gaelic football	
West Coast	Mhicca Carter	Rugby union	
Western Bulldogs	Katy Herron	Gaelic football	
Western Bulldogs	Danielle Marshall	Soccer	

== Draft ==
A draft was held on October 22, 2019. Players nominated for a single selection pool, aligned to a state or metropolitan region, with players only being eligible to be drafted by clubs operating in that region. An indicative draft order was published in early April while the final draft order was published by the AFL in the wake of the expansion signing period on 23 April.

Table of draft selections
Rd.	Pick	Player	Club	Recruited from		Notes
Rd.	Pick	Player	Club	Club	League	Notes
1	1	Gabby Newton	Western Bulldogs	Northern Knights	NAB League	←Richmond^{!}
1	2	Lucy McEvoy	Carlton	Geelong Falcons	NAB League	←Collingwood
1	3	Lily Postlethwaite	Brisbane	Maroochydore	QAFLW	
1	4	Maggie Gorham	Greater Western Sydney	Belconnen	AFL Canberra	
1	5^{!}	Georgia Patrikios	St Kilda	Calder Cannons	NAB League	
1	6	Nell Morris-Dalton	Western Bulldogs	Northern Knights	NAB League	
1	7^{!}	Sophie Molan	Richmond	GWV Rebels	NAB League	
1	8	Gemma Lagioia	Western Bulldogs	Oakleigh Chargers	NAB League	←Melbourne
1	9	Elisabeth Georgostathis	Western Bulldogs	Western Jets	NAB League	←St Kilda^{!}
1	10	Ellie Gavalas	North Melbourne	Western Bulldogs	VFL Women's	
1	11^{^}	Millie Brown	Geelong	Murray Bushrangers	NAB League	Father–daughter selection (Daughter of Paul Brown)
1	12	Roxanne Roux	Fremantle	East Fremantle	WAFLW	
1	13	Grace Egan	Carlton	Richmond	VFL Women's	Academy eligible for Richmond, but they elected not to match
1	14	Montana McKinnon	Adelaide	South Adelaide	SANFLW	
1	15	Belle Dawes	Brisbane	Maroochydore	QAFLW	←St Kilda
1	16	Cathy Svarc	Brisbane	Wilston Grange	QAFLW	←Richmond
1	17	Hannah Hillman	Brisbane	Coorparoo	QAFLW	←West Coast
1	18	Serene Watson	Gold Coast	Bond University	QAFLW	
2	19^{!}	Imahra Cameron	West Coast	Swan Districts	WAFLW	
2	20^{#}	Lucy Bellinger	Brisbane	Glenelg	SANFLW	
2	21^{#}	Mim Strom	Fremantle	Swan Districts	WAFLW	
2	22^{!}	Hannah Dunn	Gold Coast	Queanbeyan	AFL Canberra	
2	23^{#}	Lisa Steane	Greater Western Sydney	Nelson Bay	AFL Hunter Central Coast	
2	24	Rosie Dillon	St Kilda	Hawthorn	VFL Women's	←Western Bulldogs^{#}
2	25^{!}	Laura McClelland	Richmond	Eastern Ranges	NAB League	
2	26	Brooke Vernon	Carlton	Dandenong Stingrays	NAB League	←Collingwood
2	27^{!}	Nicola Xenos	St Kilda	Oakleigh Chargers	NAB League	
2	28	Tahlia Hickie	Brisbane	Coorparoo	QAFLW	
2	29	Annalyse Lister	Greater Western Sydney	Darebin Falcons	VFL Women's	
2	30	Tarni White	St Kilda	Coorparoo	QAFLW	←Western Bulldogs
2	31^{!}	Ella Wood	Richmond	GWV Rebels	NAB League	
2	32	Sarah Wright	North Melbourne	Carlton	VFL Women's	
2	33^{!}	Tamara Luke	St Kilda	Hawthorn	VFL Women's	
2	34	Gemma Wright	Geelong	Carlton	VFL Women's	
2	35	Ann McMahon	Fremantle	East Fremantle	WAFLW	
2	36	Sharnie Whiting	Carlton	Williamstown	VFL Women's	
2	37	Najwa Allen	Adelaide	Norwood	SANFLW	
2	38	Alexia Hamilton	Gold Coast	Canberra	AFL Canberra	
2	39	Sophie McDonald	West Coast	Claremont	WAFLW	Academy selection - West Coast matched bid
2	40	Sarah Sansonetti	Richmond	Northern Knights	NAB League	
2	41	Hannah Priest	St Kilda	Norwood	SANFLW	
3	42^{!}	Brittany Perry	Gold Coast	North Adelaide	SANFLW	
3	43^{!}	Holly Whitford	Richmond	Melbourne University	VFL Women's	
3	44	Serena Gibbs	Carlton	Eastern Ranges	NAB League	←Collingwood
3	45	Selina Priest	Brisbane	Coolangatta-Tweed Heads	QAFLW	
3	46	Nicole Campbell	Adelaide	South Adelaide	SANFLW	←Greater Western Sydney
3	47^{^}	Isabella Grant	Western Bulldogs	Western Jets	NAB League	Father–daughter selection (Daughter of Chris Grant)
3	48	Britney Gutknecht	Western Bulldogs	Northern Knights	NAB League	←Melbourne
3	49	Mia King	North Melbourne	Launceston	TWFL	
3	50	Nicole Garner	Geelong	Casey Demons	VFL Women's	
3	51	Emma O'Driscoll	Fremantle	Swan Districts	WAFLW	
3	52	Vaomua Laloifi	Carlton	Western Bulldogs	VFL Women's	
3	53	Jaimi Tabb	Adelaide	Woodville-West Torrens	SANFLW	
3	54	Jacqueline Parry	Melbourne	Canberra	AFL Canberra	←St Kilda
3	55	Nekaela Butler	Richmond	GWV Rebels	NAB League	
3	56	Tarnee Tester	West Coast	Subiaco	WAFLW	
3	57	Cheyenne Hammond	Gold Coast	South Adelaide	SANFLW	
4	58^{!}	Cleo Saxon-Jones	Richmond	Western Jets	NAB League	
4	59	Courtney Jones	Carlton	Southern Saints	VFL Women's	←Collingwood
4	60	Dakota Davidson	Brisbane	University of Queensland	QAFLW	
4	61	Sarah Halvorsen	Greater Western Sydney	Newcastle City	AFL Hunter Central Coast	
4	62	Amelia van Oosterwijck	Western Bulldogs	Oakleigh Chargers	NAB League	
4	63	Pass	St Kilda	—	—	←Melbourne
4	64	Tahni Nestor	North Melbourne	Melbourne University	VFL Women's	
4	65	Mia Skinner	Geelong	Geelong Falcons	NAB League	
4	66	Sarah Garstone	Fremantle	Claremont	WAFLW	
4	67	Kaila Bentvelzen	Collingwood	Casey Demons	VFL Women's	←Carlton
4	68	Caitlin Gould	Adelaide	Glenelg	SANFLW	
4	69	Dee Heslop	Gold Coast	Yeronga	QAFLW	
4	70	Kate Orme	West Coast	Claremont	WAFLW	
4	71	Laura Bailey	Richmond	Richmond	VFL Women's	Academy selection - Richmond matched Carlton bid
4	72	Brenna Tarrant	Melbourne	East Coast Eagles	Sydney AFL	←St Kilda
5	73^{!}	Emma Horne	Richmond	Richmond	VFL Women's	
5	74	Jordan Membrey	Collingwood	Hawthorn	VFL Women's	
5	75	Maria Moloney	Brisbane	University of Queensland	QAFLW	
5	76	Emily Goodsir	Greater Western Sydney	East Coast Eagles	Sydney AFL	
5	77	Gabrielle Colvin	Melbourne	Darebin Falcons	VFL Women's	←Western Bulldogs
5	78	Krstel Petrevski	Melbourne	Calder Cannons	NAB League	
5	79	Abbey Green	North Melbourne	Launceston	TWFL	
5	80	Amy McDonald	Geelong	Geelong	VFL Women's	
5	81	Janelle Cuthbertson	Fremantle	Perth Angels	WAFLW	
5	82	Alana Porter	Collingwood	Oakleigh Chargers	NAB League	←Carlton
5	83	Courtney Gum	Adelaide	South Adelaide	SANFLW	
5	84	Kate Dempsey	Richmond	Richmond	VFL Women's	Academy selection - Richmond matched Collingwood bid
5	85	Bianca Webb	Fremantle	Swan Districts	WAFLW	←West Coast
5	86	Jade Pregelj	Gold Coast	Yeronga	QAFLW	
6	87	Ciara Fitzgerald	Richmond	Northern Knights	NAB League	
6	88	Pass	Western Bulldogs	—	—	←West Coast
6	89	Ebony O'Dea	Collingwood	Greater Western Sydney	AFLW	
6	90	Georgia Garnett	Greater Western Sydney	East Coast Eagles	Sydney AFL	
6	91	Georgia Breward	Gold Coast	Coolangatta-Tweed Heads	QAFLW	
6	92	Talia Radan	West Coast	Hawthorn	VFL Women's	
6	93	Emily Harley	Richmond	Oakleigh Chargers	NAB League	
6	94	Machaelia Roberts	Collingwood	NT Thunder	VFL Women's	
6	95	Tait Mackrill	Greater Western Sydney	UNSW Eastern Suburbs	Sydney AFL	
6	96	Lauren Tesoriero	Richmond	Richmond	VFL Women's	
6	97	Rebecca Privitelli	Greater Western Sydney	UNSW Eastern Suburbs	Sydney AFL	
6	98	Madisen Maguire	Geelong	Geelong Falcons	NAB League	
6	99	Lisa Whiteley	Greater Western Sydney	UNSW Eastern Suburbs	Sydney AFL	
7	100	Madison Newman	Adelaide	West Adelaide	SANFLW	
7	101	Chantella Perera	West Coast	Hawthorn	VFL Women's	
7	102	Chelsea Biddell	Adelaide	West Adelaide	SANFLW	

== Post-Draft ==
=== Undrafted free agency ===
A final free agency period opened after the conclusion of the draft, allowing clubs that passed on a draft selection to recruit from outside their state-based zone.

Table of injury replacement player signings
Date	Player	Free agent type	Former club	New club	Ref
23 October	Hannah Munyard	Undrafted	South Adelaide	Western Bulldogs	
23 October	Nadia von Bertouch	Undrafted	North Adelaide	St Kilda	

=== Train-on list ===
Before the opening round of the season, clubs were permitted to replace players who had suffered a long-term injury or for whom personal circumstances had ruled them out for playing in any match that year. The replacement players are signed to a train-on list and are considered semi-eligible for section. Though they are eligible to train with the club, they cannot be selected for match play until further injuries to player on the club's list mean a club has fewer than 23 players available for any single match.

Table of undrafted free agency period signings
Club	New signing	Player replacing	Reason for replacement	Ref
Adelaide	Czenya Cavouras	Ruth Wallace	Personal	
Adelaide	Rachelle Martin	Chelsea Randall	Injury (ACL)	
Geelong	Elise Coventry	Mia Skinner	Injury (ACL)	
Greater Western Sydney	Elizabeth Graham	Amanda Farrugia	Retirement	
Melbourne	Sarah Perkins	Katherine Smith	Injury (ACL)	
Melbourne	Kirby Bentley	Shae Sloane	Injury (ACL)	
North Melbourne	Vivien Saad	Jess Duffin	Pregnancy	
Richmond	Hannah McLaren	Emily Harley	Injury (shoulder)	
West Coast	Andrea Gilmore	Alicia Janz	Injury (shoulder)	
Western Bulldogs	Nicole McMahon	Aisling Utri	Injury (shoulder)	

Note: North Melbourne was given special permission to treat Saad as a full signing.

== See also ==
- 2019 AFL draft
