= Cathy Svarc =

Australian rules footballer

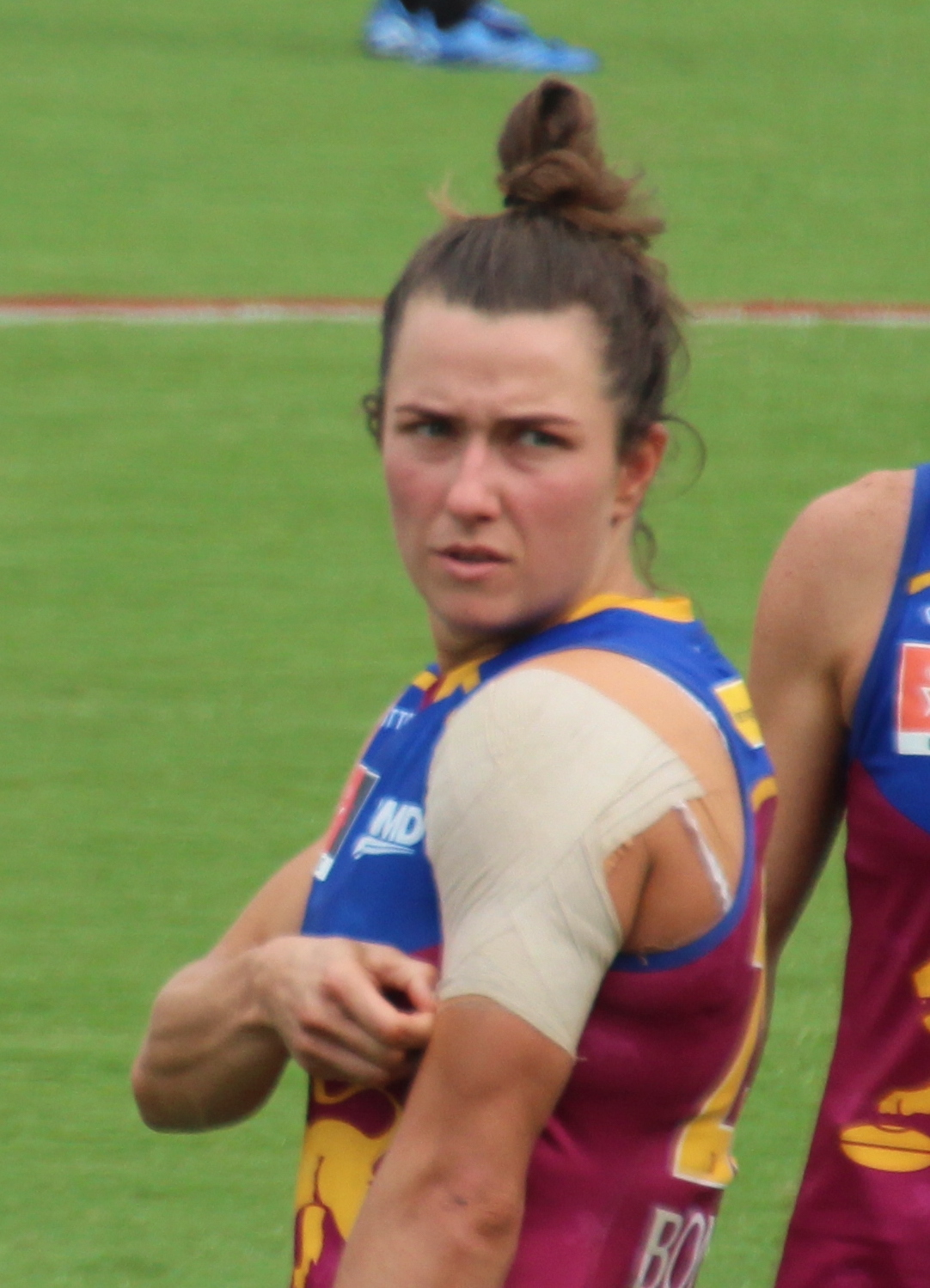
- Svarc after the 2022 season 7 Grand Final

Personal information
- Born: 25 November 1991 (age 34)
- Original team: Wilston Grange (QWAFL)
- Draft: No. 16, 2019 AFL Women's draft
- Debut: Round 1, 2020, Brisbane vs. Adelaide, at Hickey Park
- Height: 165 cm (5 ft 5 in)
- Position: Half-back flank/Midfielder

Club information
- Current club: Brisbane
- Number: 25

Playing career^{1}
Years	Club	Games (Goals)
2020–	Brisbane	55 (14)
- ^{1} Playing statistics correct to the end of the 2023 season.

Career highlights
- AFLW premiership player: 2021, 2023

Catherine Svarc (born 25 November 1991) is an Australian rules footballer playing for Brisbane in the AFL Women's competition (AFLW).

Svarc is from Corowa, New South Wales and grew up on a farm with younger sister Ruby Svarc in a family passionate about Australian rules. Cathy played competitive netball before moving to Geelong to become a physiotherapist. She moved to Queensland playing two seasons for Wilston Grange in the AFL Queensland Women's League before being drafted by Brisbane with the 16th pick in the 2019 AFL Women's draft.

Svarc made her debut in the Lions' round 1 game against Adelaide at Hickey Park on 8 February 2020.
