= Jaimi Tabb =

Australian rules footballer (born 2001)

Personal information
- Full name: Jaimi Tabb
- Born: 9 February 2001 (age 25)
- Original team: Woodville-West Torrens (SANFLW)
- Draft: No. 53, 2019 national draft
- Debut: Round 1, 2020, Adelaide vs. Brisbane, at Hickey Park
- Height: 168 cm (5 ft 6 in)
- Position: Midfielder

Playing career^{1}
Years	Club	Games (Goals)
2020	Adelaide	3 (0)
- ^{1} Playing statistics correct to the end of the 2020 season.

Jaimi Tabb (born 9 February 2001) is an Australian rules footballer who plays for the Western Bulldogs in the VFL Women's (VFLW). She previously played for Adelaide in the AFL Women's (AFLW) in 2020.
