= Nicole Campbell =

Australian rules footballer (born 1994)

Personal information
- Nickname: Nikkers
- Born: 20 January 1994 (age 32)
- Original team: South Adelaide (SANFLW)
- Draft: No. 46, 2019 AFL Women's draft
- Debut: Round 1, 2020, Adelaide vs. Brisbane, at Hickey Park
- Height: 170 cm (5 ft 7 in)
- Position: Defender

Playing career^{1}
Years	Club	Games (Goals)
2020	Adelaide	5 (0)
- ^{1} Playing statistics correct to the end of the 2020 season.

Career highlights
- SANFLW premiership player (South Adelaide): 2019; AdelFL Division 2 premiership player (Christies Beach): 2017; Christies Beach Best and Fairest: 2018

Nicole Campbell (born 20 January 1994) is an Australian rules footballer who played for the Adelaide Football Club in the AFL Women's (AFLW).

== Early life and state football ==
Campbell was originally a soccer player and viewed American goalkeeper Hope Solo as her favourite sportsperson. She played soccer most of her life, even representing South Australia, before she lost her passion and switched to Australian rules football in 2017. She joined Christies Beach and won the 2017 AdelFL Division 2 premiership with them, as well as winning their 2018 best and fairest award. The coach of Christies Beach was also an assistant coach at Norwood and invited her to trial for the 2018 team. She joined Norwood and was part of the team to reach the 2018 SANFL Women's League (SANFLW) Grand Final, only to lose to South Adelaide. Following the match, she was praised for her defensive performance. In the off-season, Campbell joined South Adelaide. That season, she was part of the South Adelaide team that won the 2019 SANFLW premiership and was selected in the 2019 SANFLW Team of the Year, finishing in the top 10 for disposals and inside 50s. At the end of the season, Campbell represented Port Adelaide in the SANFLW Showdown.

== AFL Women's career ==
Campbell was drafted by Adelaide with the club's third selection and the 46th overall in the 2019 AFL Women's draft. Campbell made her debut in the opening round of the 2020 season against Brisbane at Hickey Park. At the end of the season, Campbell was delisted by Adelaide.

== Personal life ==
Campbell and her family are all supporters of Adelaide, even going to games as a baby. She works as a correctional officer at a men's prison in Adelaide.
