= Lucy Bellinger =

Australian rules footballer

Personal information
- Born: 6 November 1993 (age 32)
- Original team: Glenelg (SANFLW)
- Draft: No. 20, 2019 AFL Women's draft
- Debut: Round 6, 2020, Brisbane vs. Collingwood, at Hickey Park
- Height: 178 cm (5 ft 10 in)
- Position: Half-back/Half-forward/Wing

Playing career^{1}
| Years | Club | Games (Goals) |
| 2020 | Brisbane | 1 (0) |
- ^{1} Playing statistics correct to the end of the 2020 season.

Lucy Bellinger (born 6 November 1993) is a former Australian rules footballer who played for Brisbane in the AFL Women's competition (AFLW). She was playing for Glenelg in the SANFLW when she was drafted by Brisbane with the 20th pick in the 2019 AFL Women's draft.

Bellinger made her debut in the Lions' round 6 game against Collingwood at Hickey Park on 14 March 2020.

Bellinger was delisted ahead of the 2021 AFL Women's season.

== Statistics ==
Legend
| G | Goals | K | Kicks | D | Disposals | T | Tackles |
| B | Behinds | H | Handballs | M | Marks |

| Season | Team | No. | Games | Totals | | | | | | | Averages (per game) | | | | | | | Votes |
| Season | Team | No. | Games | G | B | K | H | D | M | T | G | B | K | H | D | M | T | Votes |
|---|---|---|---|---|---|---|---|---|---|---|---|---|---|---|---|---|---|---|
| 2020 | Brisbane | 26 | 1 | 0 | 0 | 3 | 0 | 3 | 1 | 3 | 0.0 | 0.0 | 3.0 | 0.0 | 3.0 | 1.0 | 3.0 | 0 |
| Career | | | 1 | 0 | 0 | 3 | 0 | 3 | 1 | 3 | 0.0 | 0.0 | 3.0 | 0.0 | 3.0 | 1.0 | 3.0 | 0 |
