= Ann McMahon =

Australian rules footballer

Personal information
- Born: 1 July 1994 (age 32)
- Original team: East Fremantle (WAFLW)
- Draft: No. 35, 2019 AFL Women's draft
- Debut: Round 1, 2022 (S6), Fremantle vs. West Coast, at Fremantle Oval
- Height: 165 cm (5 ft 5 in)
- Position: Forward

Playing career
Years	Club	Games (Goals)
2020–2022 (S6)	Fremantle	6 (1)

Ann McMahon (born 1 July 1994) is an Australian rules footballer who played for the Fremantle Football Club in the AFL Women's (AFLW).

McMahon was drafted by Fremantle with their third selection, and 35th overall in the 2019 AFL Women's draft.

On Christmas Eve in 2019, McMahon was working as a police officer and was hit by a stolen car whilst attempting to stop the car using spike strips. She suffered a broken left fibula and a torn anterior cruciate ligament on her right leg and was unable to play for the 2020 and 2021 seasons. She made her AFLW debut in the opening round of 2022 AFL Women's season 6.

McMahon was delisted by Fremantle in April 2022.
