= Madisen Maguire =

Female Australian rules footballer

Personal information
- Full name: Madisen Maguire
- Born: 6 March 1996 (age 30)
- Original team: Geelong Falcons (NAB League)
- Draft: No. 98, 2019 national draft
- Debut: Round 1, 2020, Geelong vs. Fremantle, at Fremantle Oval
- Height: 164 cm (5 ft 5 in)
- Position: Forward

Playing career^{1}
Years	Club	Games (Goals)
2020–2022	Geelong	10 (2)
- ^{1} Playing statistics correct to the end of the 2022 season.

Madisen Maguire (born 6 March 1996) is an Australian rules footballer who played for Geelong in the AFL Women's (AFLW).

== AFLW career ==
In October 2019, Maguire was drafted by Geelong with pick #98. In June 2022, Maguire was delisted by Geelong.
