= Abbey Green (footballer) =

Australian rules footballer

Personal information
- Full name: Abbey Green
- Born: 22 January 1997 (age 29)
- Original team: Launceston (TWFL)
- Draft: No. 79, 2019 national draft
- Debut: Round 2, 2020, North Melbourne vs. Greater Western Sydney, at UTAS Stadium
- Height: 183 cm (6 ft 0 in)
- Position: Ruck

Playing career
Years	Club	Games (Goals)
2020	North Melbourne	2 (2)
2021	Collingwood	0 (0)
Total		2 (2)

Abbey Green (born 22 January 1997) is a retired Australian rules footballer who played for North Melbourne and Collingwood in the AFL Women's (AFLW).

== State football ==
Green played for Launceston in the Tasmanian Women's Football League (TWFL), and was a standout player, being selected for three seasons in a row for the league's Team of the Year. In June 2019, Green represented Melbourne University in a VFL Women's match against Western Bulldogs. In the match she collected 17 disposals, took five marks and had 10 hitouts.

== AFLW career ==
=== North Melbourne ===
Green was drafted by North Melbourne with the 79th pick of the 2019 AFL Women's draft. She kicked two goals in two games in North Melbourne's inaugural season.

=== Collingwood ===
In August 2020, Green was traded to Collingwood in exchange for the 40th pick of the 2020 AFL Women's draft. After the 2021 season, Green announced her retirement after not playing a single game for Collingwood.

== Statistics ==
Statistics are correct to the end of the 2021 season.

Legend
G	Goals	K	Kicks	D	Disposals	T	Tackles
B	Behinds	H	Handballs	M	Marks

Season	Team	No.	Games	Totals							Averages (per game)						
Season	Team	No.	Games	G	B	K	H	D	M	T	G	B	K	H	D	M	T
2020	North Melbourne	26	2	2	0	8	2	10	2	1	1.0	0.0	4.0	1.0	5.0	1.0	0.5
2021	Collingwood	4	0	–	–	–	–	–	–	–	–	–	–	–	–	–	–
Career			2	2	0	8	2	10	2	1	1.0	0.0	4.0	1.0	5.0	1.0	0.5
