= Sammie Johnson =

Female Australian rules footballer

Personal information
- Full name: Samantha Johnson
- Born: 6 August 1992 (age 34)
- Original team: Casey Demons (VFLW)
- Draft: Pre-list signing, 2019 national draft Pick 49, 2022 AFL Woman’s draft
- Debut: Round 5, 2020, St Kilda vs. Carlton, at Ikon Park
- Height: 176 cm (5 ft 9 in)
- Weight: 75 kg (165 lb)
- Position: Midfielder

Club information
- Current club: Melbourne

Playing career^{1}
| Years | Club | Games (Goals) |
| 2020 | St Kilda | 1 (0) |
| S7 (2022)– | Melbourne | 3 (0) |
| Total | | 4 (0) |
- ^{1} Playing statistics correct to the end of the S7 (2022) season.

Samantha Johnson (born 6 August 1992) is an Australian rules footballer who plays for Melbourne in the AFL Women's (AFLW). She has previously played for St Kilda.

== AFLW career ==
In August 2020, she was delisted by St Kilda.

In June 2022, Johnson returned to the AFLW after being drafted by Melbourne. After playing three games, Johnson announced she was pregnant on September 24, and would sit out the rest of that season: she became the first ever AFLW player to play while pregnant.
