= Isabella Shannon =

Australian rules footballer

Personal information
- Full name: Isabella Shannon
- Born: 30 June 2001 (age 25)
- Original team: Dandenong Stingrays (NAB League)
- Draft: Pre-list signing, 2019 national draft
- Debut: Round 3, 2020, St Kilda vs. Melbourne, at RSEA Park
- Height: 178 cm (5 ft 10 in)
- Position: Half-forward

Playing career^{1}
Years	Club	Games (Goals)
2020–2022	St Kilda	17 (1)
- ^{1} Playing statistics correct to the end of the 2022 season.

Isabella Shannon (born 30 June 2001) is an Australian rules footballer who played for St Kilda in the AFL Women's (AFLW).

In May 2022, Shannon was delisted by St Kilda, to allow her to focus on her studies.
