= Britney Gutknecht =

Female Australian rules footballer

Personal information
- Full name: Britney Gutknecht
- Born: 20 April 2001 (age 25)
- Original team: Northern Knights (NAB League)
- Draft: No. 48, 2019 national draft
- Debut: Round 4, 2020, Western Bulldogs vs. West Coast, at Leederville Oval
- Height: 167 cm (5 ft 6 in)
- Position: Midfielder

Club information
- Current club: Western Bulldogs
- Number: 18

Playing career^{1}
Years	Club	Games (Goals)
2020–	Western Bulldogs	22 (5)
- ^{1} Playing statistics correct to the end of the 2023 season.

Britney Gutknecht (born 20 April 2001) is an Australian rules footballer who plays for Western Bulldogs in the AFL Women's (AFLW). It was revealed that Gutknecht had signed a contract extension with the club on 16 June 2021, after playing 4 games for the club that season.

== Statistics ==
Statistics are correct to the end of the 2021 season.

Legend
G	Goals	K	Kicks	D	Disposals	T	Tackles
B	Behinds	H	Handballs	M	Marks

Season	Team	No.	Games	Totals							Averages (per game)							Votes
Season	Team	No.	Games	G	B	K	H	D	M	T	G	B	K	H	D	M	T	Votes
2020	Western Bulldogs	18	2	0	0	8	6	14	3	7	0.0	0.0	4.0	3.0	7.0	1.5	3.5	0
2021	Western Bulldogs	18	4	0	0	11	18	29	2	13	0.0	0.0	2.8	4.5	7.3	0.5	3.3	0
Career			6	0	0	19	24	43	5	20	0.0	0.0	3.2	4.0	7.2	0.8	3.3	0
