= Kate Dempsey =

Australian rules footballer

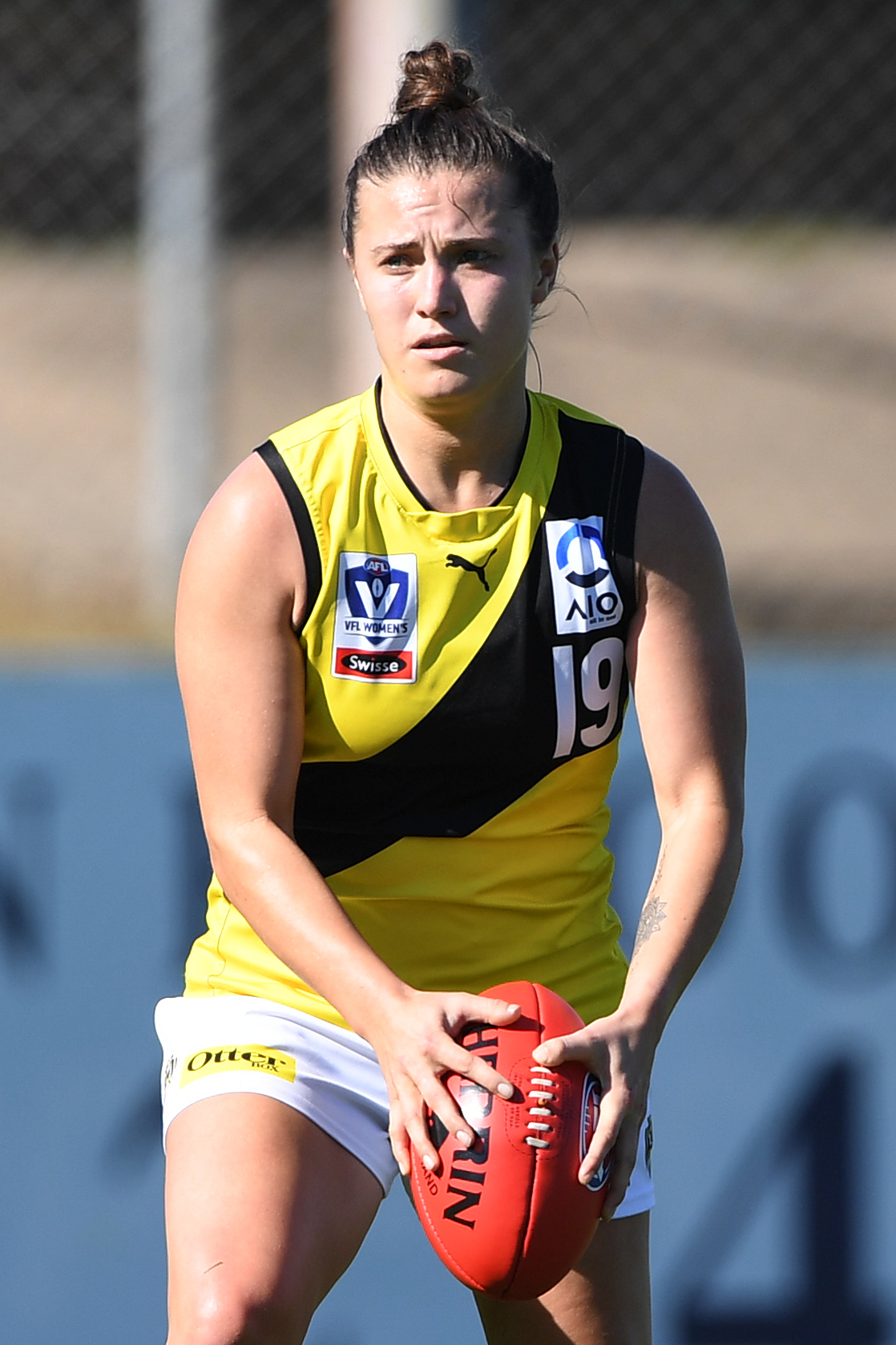
- Dempsey with Richmond's VFLW team in June 2019

Personal information
- Born: 25 March 1995 (age 31)
- Original team: Richmond (VFLW)
- Debut: Round 5, 2020, Richmond vs. Greater Western Sydney, at Robertson Oval
- Height: 160 cm (5 ft 3 in)
- Position: Wing

Club information
- Current club: Richmond
- Number: 19

Playing career^{1}
Years	Club	Games (Goals)
2020–	Richmond	42 (1)
- ^{1} Playing statistics correct to the end of the 2023 season.

Kate Dempsey (born 25 March 1995) is an Australian rules footballer playing for the Richmond Football Club in the AFL Women's (AFLW). Dempsey was drafted by Richmond with the club's tenth selection and the 84th pick overall in the 2019 AFL Women's draft. She made her debut against Greater Western Sydney at Robertson Oval in Wagga Wagga in round 5 of the 2020 season.

In October 2024 Dempsey was the target of homophobic social media comments following an article she wrote for AFLW's Pride Round.

== Statistics ==
Statistics are correct to the end of the 2021 season.

Legend
G	Goals	K	Kicks	D	Disposals	T	Tackles
B	Behinds	H	Handballs	M	Marks

Season	Team	No.	Games	Totals							Averages (per game)						
Season	Team	No.	Games	G	B	K	H	D	M	T	G	B	K	H	D	M	T
2020	Richmond	19	1	0	0	7	3	10	6	4	0.0	0.0	7.0	3.0	10.0	6.0	4.0
2021	Richmond	19	9	0	0	81	30	111	20	15	0.0	0.8	9.0	3.3	12.3	2.2	1.7
Career			10	0	0	88	33	121	26	19	0.0	0.0	8.8	3.3	12.1	2.6	1.9
