= Lisa Whiteley =

Australian rules footballer (born 1993)

Personal information
- Born: 17 January 1993 (age 33)
- Original teams: Port Adelaide Womens Football Club (SAWFL); Morphettville Park (SAWFL)
- Draft: No. 54, 2018 national draft No. 99, 2019 national draft
- Debut: Round 6, 2019, Greater Western Sydney vs. Adelaide, at Unley Oval
- Height: 171 cm (5 ft 7 in)
- Position: Key-position utility

Club information
- Current club: Adelaide
- Number: 22

Playing career^{1}
Years	Club	Games (Goals)
2019–2020	Greater Western Sydney	2 (0)
2021–	Adelaide	21 (6)
Total		23 (6)
- ^{1} Playing statistics correct to the end of the S7 (2022) season.

Lisa Whiteley (born 17 January 1993) is an Australian rules footballer who plays for Adelaide in the AFL Women's (AFLW). Whiteley was a teacher at Aldinga Beach B-7 Primary School as a PE Teacher before being drafted to Greater Western Sydney. Whiteley grew up in Adelaide's southern suburbs. She began playing football for the Port Adelaide Women's Football Club in 2011 before turning her attention to netball with the Woods Panthers.

She returned to football with Morphettville Park in 2017. in 2018 she kicked 17 goals in 13 games for the club. Whiteley also played for South Adelaide in their 2018 premiership season in the SANFL Women's, and was ranked among their best in the grand final.

She also played netball for Goolwa in 2017 & 2018, helping the club to consecutive Grand Finals playing predominantly as wing defence.

Whiteley was selected by GWS with pick 54 in the 2018 national draft. Giving up a full-time teaching contract, she moved to Sydney and debuted in round 6 against Adelaide at Unley Oval.

At the conclusion of the season, Whiteley was delisted by GWS. Whitely was then redrafted by the Giants with their final pick (99) in the 2019 AFLW Draft after a strong winter.

In 2020 she was traded to Adelaide ahead of the 2021 AFL Women's season.
