= Georgia Garnett =

Australian rules footballer

Personal information
- Full name: Georgia Garnett
- Born: 5 September 2001 (age 25)
- Original team: East Coast Eagles (Sydney AFL)
- Draft: No. 90, 2019 national draft
- Debut: Round 3, 2021, Greater Western Sydney vs. Gold Coast, at Blacktown ISP Oval
- Height: 176 cm (5 ft 9 in)
- Position: Forward / Defender

Club information
- Current club: Greater Western Sydney
- Number: 17

Playing career^{1}
Years	Club	Games (Goals)
2020–	Greater Western Sydney	33 (11)
- ^{1} Playing statistics correct to the end of the 2023 season.

Career highlights
- 22under22 team: 2021

Georgia Garnett (born 5 September 2001) is an Australian rules footballer who plays for Greater Western Sydney in the AFL Women's (AFLW).

== AFLW career ==
Garnett was drafted by Greater Western Sydney in the 2019 AFL Women's draft with the 90th pick. After not playing in the 2020 season, Garnett made her debut in the 2021 season against Gold Coast. Finishing the season with seven appearances, she was selected for the 2021 22under22 team.

Garnett identifies as queer.
