= Sarah Garstone =

Australian rules footballer

Personal information
- Born: 16 December 1999 (age 26)
- Original team: Claremont (WAFL Women's)
- Draft: No. 66, 2019 AFL Women's draft
- Debut: Round 6, 2020, Fremantle vs. Western Bulldogs, at Whitten Oval
- Height: 175 cm (5 ft 9 in)
- Position: Defender

Playing career^{1}
Years	Club	Games (Goals)
2020	Fremantle	1 (0)
- ^{1} Playing statistics correct to the end of 2020 season.

Sarah Garstone (born 16 December 1999) is an Australian rules footballer who played for the Fremantle Football Club in the AFL Women's (AFLW).

== AFLW career ==
Garstone was drafted by Fremantle with their fifth selection, 66th overall, in the 2019 AFL Women's draft after playing for Claremont in the WAFL Women's. In August 2020, she was delisted by Fremantle.

== Personal life ==
In 2020, Garstone and Hayley Miller co-hosted Fremantle's AFLW podcast Kickin' back with Hayley and Sez.
