= Bianca Webb =

Australian rules footballer

Personal information
- Born: 14 September 2001 (age 25)
- Original team: Swan Districts (WAWFL)
- Draft: No. 85, 2019 AFL Women's draft
- Debut: Round 2, 2020, Fremantle vs. West Coast, at Optus Stadium
- Height: 165 cm (5 ft 5 in)
- Position: Midfielder

Playing career^{1}
Years	Club	Games (Goals)
2020–2022 (S7)	Fremantle	19 (4)
- ^{1} Playing statistics correct to the end of 2022 season 7.

Bianca Webb (born 14 September 2001) is an Australian rules footballer who played for the Fremantle Football Club in the AFL Women's (AFLW). Webb was drafted by Fremantle with their final selection, 85th overall, in the 2019 AFL Women's draft after playing for Swan Districts in the West Australian Women's Football League (WAWFL). It was announced she re-signed with the Dockers on 5 June 2021. In March 2023, Webb was delisted by Fremantle.

== Statistics ==
Statistics are correct to the end of the 2021 season.

Legend
G	Goals	K	Kicks	D	Disposals	T	Tackles
B	Behinds	H	Handballs	M	Marks

Season	Team	No.	Games	Totals							Averages (per game)							Votes
Season	Team	No.	Games	G	B	K	H	D	M	T	G	B	K	H	D	M	T	Votes
2020	Fremantle	26	5	0	0	18	9	27	4	11	0.0	0.0	3.6	1.8	5.4	1.2	2.2	0
2021	Fremantle	26	7	1	1	32	11	43	8	20	0.1	0.1	4.6	1.6	6.1	1.1	2.9	0
Career			12	1	1	50	20	70	12	31	0.1	0.1	4.2	1.7	5.8	1.0	2.6	0
