= Holly Whitford =

Australian rules footballer (born 1999)

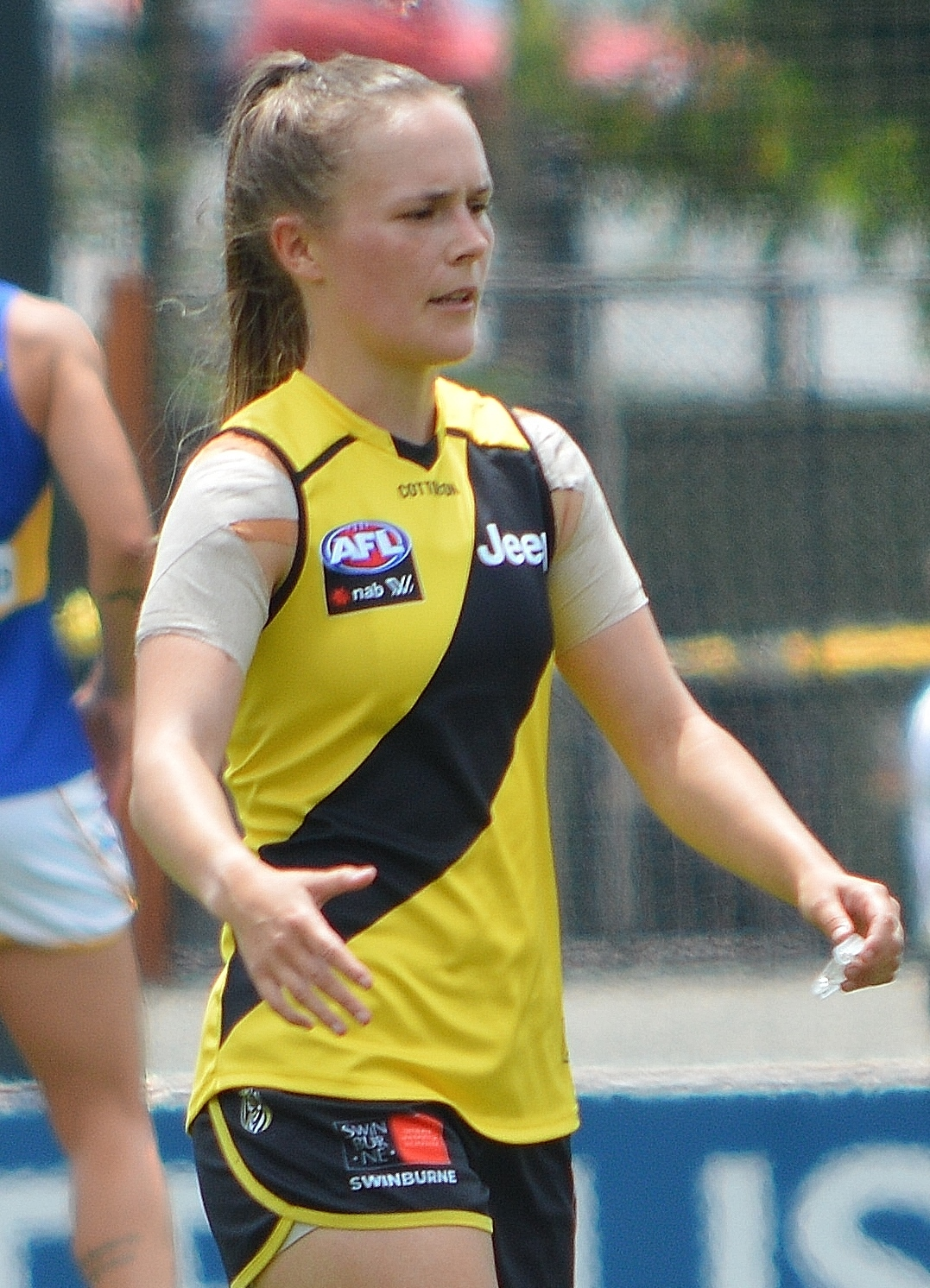
- Whitford with Richmond in January 2020

Personal information
- Born: 11 February 1999 (age 27)
- Original team: Cranbourne (VFL Women's)
- Draft: No. 43, 2019 AFL Women's draft No. 4, 2017 AFL Women's rookie draft
- Debut: Round 2, 2018, Collingwood vs. Fremantle, at Optus Stadium
- Height: 164 cm (5 ft 5 in)
- Position: Midfielder / forward

Playing career^{1}
Years	Club	Games (Goals)
2018–2019	Collingwood	4 (0)
2020–2021	Richmond	4 (0)
Total		8 (0)
- ^{1} Playing statistics correct to the end of the 2021 season.

Holly Whitford (born 11 February 1999) is an Australian rules footballer who played in the AFL Women's (AFLW). She played four matches over a two-year tenure with Collingwood between 2018 and 2019 and played four matches with Richmond in 2020 before being placed on the inactive list in 2021 prior to her delisting at the end of the season.

== AFL Women's career ==
Whitford was drafted by Collingwood with the club's first selection and the fourth pick overall in the 2017 AFL Women's rookie draft. She made her debut in the thirteen point loss to Fremantle at Optus Stadium in round 2 of the 2018 season.

In April 2019, Whitford was delisted by Collingwood.

Wood was drafted by Richmond with the club's fifth pick and the 43rd selection overall in the 2019 AFL Women's draft.

She made her Richmond debut in the club's inaugural game against Carlton at Ikon Park.

Whitford was placed onto the club's inactive list for the entirety of the 2021 season due to a persistent foot injury. At the end of the season, she was delisted by the club.

== Statistics ==
Statistics are correct to the end of the 2020 season.

Legend
G	Goals	K	Kicks	D	Disposals	T	Tackles
B	Behinds	H	Handballs	M	Marks

Season	Team	No.	Games	Totals							Averages (per game)						
Season	Team	No.	Games	G	B	K	H	D	M	T	G	B	K	H	D	M	T
2018	Collingwood	28	3	0	0	8	4	12	4	10	0.0	0.0	2.7	1.3	4.0	1.3	3.3
2019	Collingwood	28	1	0	0	4	0	4	2	3	0.0	0.0	4.0	0.0	4.0	2.0	3.0
2020	Richmond	20	4	0	0	16	3	19	0	7	0.0	0.0	4.0	0.8	4.8	0.0	1.8
Career			8	0	0	28	7	35	6	20	0.0	0.0	3.5	0.9	4.4	0.8	2.5
