= Nicola Xenos =

Australian rules footballer

Personal information
- Full name: Nicola Xenos
- Born: 8 March 2001 (age 25)
- Original team: Oakleigh Chargers (NAB League)
- Draft: No. 27, 2019 national draft
- Debut: Round 1, 2020, St Kilda vs. Western Bulldogs, at RSEA Park
- Height: 161 cm (5 ft 3 in)
- Position: Utility

Club information
- Current club: St Kilda
- Number: 27

Playing career^{1}
Years	Club	Games (Goals)
2020–	St Kilda	34 (15)
- ^{1} Playing statistics correct to the end of the 2023 season.

Career highlights
- St Kilda leading goalkicker: 2022

Nicola Xenos (born 8 March 2001) is an Australian rules footballer who plays for St Kilda in the AFL Women's (AFLW). It was revealed Xenos had signed on with the Saints for two more years on 30 June 2021, tying her to the club until the end of the 2022/2023 season.

Xenos is currently studying a Bachelor of Exercise and Sport Science/Bachelor of Business (Sport Management) at Deakin University. She attended high school at Ruyton Girls School and Carey Baptist Grammar School.
