= Kelly O'Neill =

Australian rules footballer

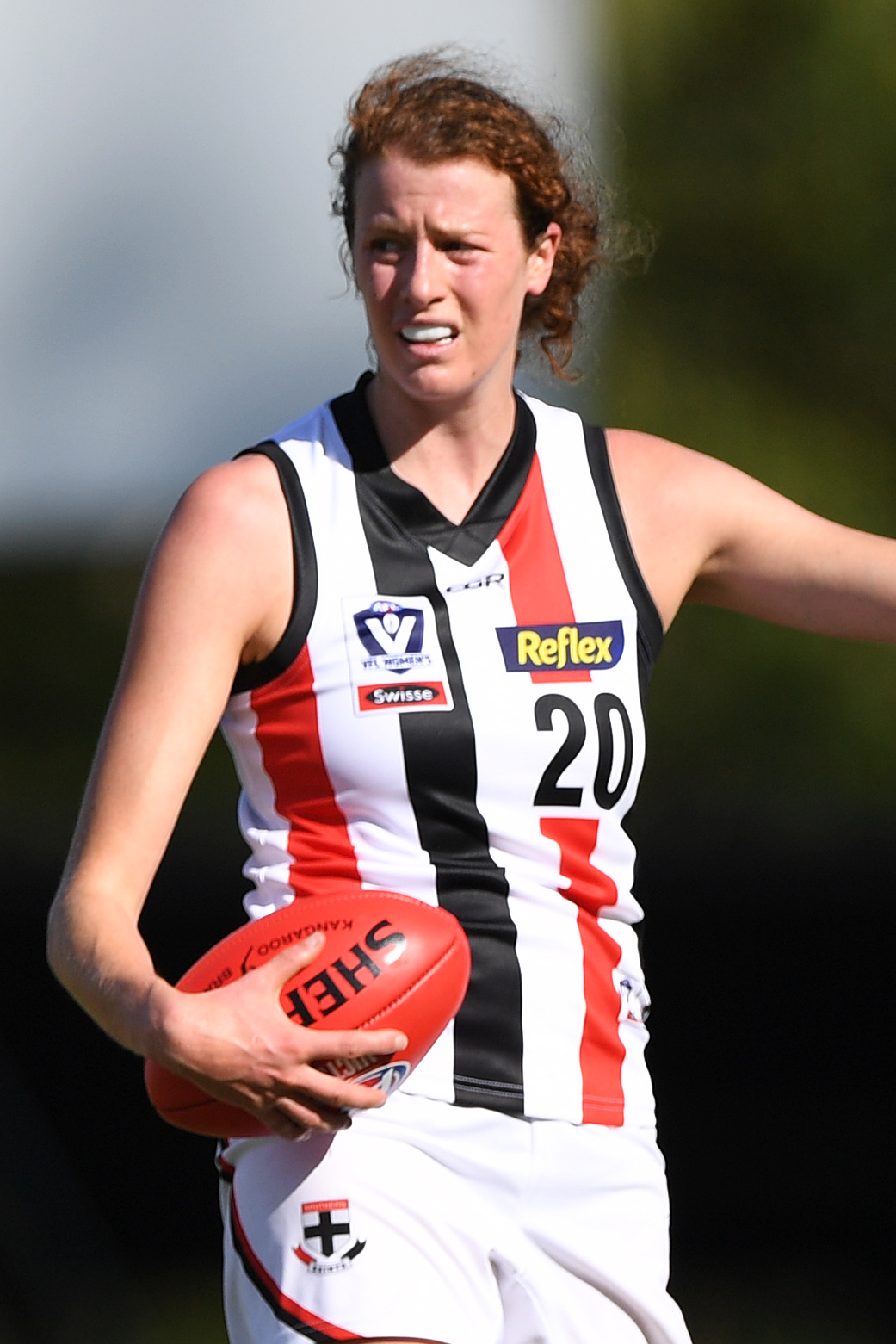
- O'Neill playing for the Southern Saints in May 2019

Personal information
- Born: 20 April 1991 (age 35)
- Original team: Southern Saints (VFLW)
- Debut: Round 1, 2020, St Kilda vs. Western Bulldogs, at RSEA Park
- Height: 184 cm (6 ft 0 in)
- Position: Midfielder

Playing career^{1}
Years	Club	Games (Goals)
2020	St Kilda	3 (0)
- ^{1} Playing statistics correct to the end of the 2020 season.

Kelly O'Neill (born 20 April 1991) is an Australian rules footballer who played for the St Kilda Football Club in the AFL Women's (AFLW).

== AFLW career ==
O'Neill signed with St Kilda during the first period of the 2019 expansion club signing period in September. She made her debut against the Western Bulldogs at RSEA Park in the opening round of the 2020 season. In August 2020, she was delisted by St Kilda.
