= Delma Gisu =

Australian rules footballer (born 1996)

Personal information
- Born: 2 July 1996 (age 30); Mer Island
- Original team: Wilston Grange Gorillas
- Draft: No. 65
- Debut: 15 March 2019, Greater Western Sydney vs. Geelong, at UNSW Canberra Oval
- Height: 158 cm (5 ft 2 in)
- Position: Forward

Playing career^{1}
Years	Club	Games (Goals)
2018–2019	Greater Western Sydney	1 (0)
- ^{1} Playing statistics correct to the end of the 2019 season.

Delma Gisu (born 2 July 1996) is an Australian rules footballer who played for Greater Western Sydney in the AFL Women's (AFLW) competition.

== Early life ==
Delma Gisu was born in 1996 on Mer Island. Gisu moved to Townsville, Queensland as a teenager to attend school. She was playing for the Wilston Grange Gorillas when she was drafted. She was the first Torres-Strait Islander to be drafted into the AFLW.

== AFLW career ==
Gisu was recruited by Greater Western Sydney as the number 65 pick in the 2018 AFL Women's draft. Previously, she was named in the inaugural Winter Series team of the Gold Coast Suns in May 2018.

Greater Western Sydney signed Gisu for the 2019 season during the trade period in October 2018. She made her debut in the AFLW in the final round of the 2019 AFLW season against Geelong.

In April 2019, Gisu was delisted by Greater Western Sydney.
