= Jordann Hickey =

Australian rules footballer

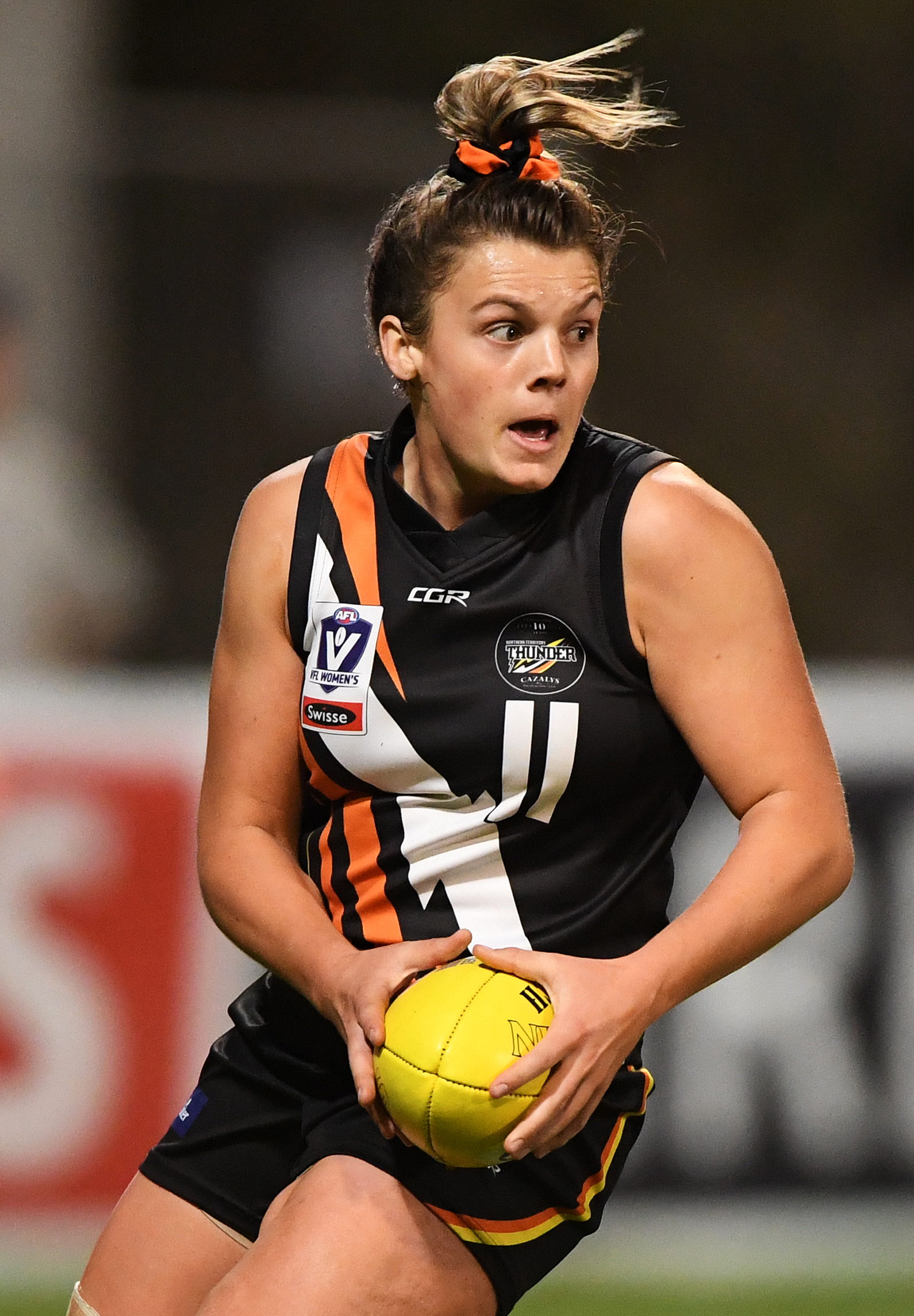
- Hickey playing for NT Thunder in July 2019

Personal information
- Born: 22 December 1994 (age 31)
- Original team: Northern Territory (VFLW)
- Draft: No. 31, 2018 national draft
- Debut: Round 1, 2020, Gold Coast vs. Greater Western Sydney, at Blacktown ISP Oval
- Height: 174 cm (5 ft 9 in)
- Position: Forward

Playing career^{1}
Years	Club	Games (Goals)
2019	Melbourne	0 (0)
2020–2021	Gold Coast	9 (1)
- ^{1} Playing statistics correct to the end of the 2021 season.

Jordann Hickey (born 22 December 1994) is an Australian rules footballer who played for Melbourne and the Gold Coast in the AFL Women's (AFLW). She was drafted by Melbourne with their third selection and thirty-first overall in the 2018 AFLW draft. She was delisted by Melbourne at the end of the 2019 season without playing a match.

Hickey signed with Gold Coast during the 2019 free agency period in July. She made her debut against Greater Western Sydney at Blacktown ISP Oval in the opening round of the 2020 season. At the end of the 2021 season, Hickey was delisted by the Gold Coast after playing nine matches across two seasons.

== Statistics ==
Statistics are correct to the end of the 2020 season.

Legend
G	Goals	K	Kicks	D	Disposals	T	Tackles
B	Behinds	H	Handballs	M	Marks

Season	Team	No.	Games	Totals							Averages (per game)							Votes
Season	Team	No.	Games	G	B	K	H	D	M	T	G	B	K	H	D	M	T	Votes
2020	Gold Coast	4	7	1	1	50	14	64	8	17	0.1	0.1	7.1	2.0	9.1	1.1	2.4	
Career			7	1	1	50	14	64	8	17	0.1	0.1	7.1	2.0	9.1	1.1	2.4	
