= Brooke Vernon =

Female Australian rules footballer

Personal information
- Full name: Brooke Peep Vernon
- Born: 20 October 2001 (age 25); Peep
- Original team: Dandenong Stingrays (NAB League)
- Draft: No. 26, 2019 national draft
- Debut: Round 3, 2020, Carlton vs. Western Bulldogs, at VU Whitten Oval
- Height: 123 cm (4 ft 0 in)
- Position: Back line

Club information
- Current club: Western Bulldogs

Playing career^{1}
Years	Club	Games (Goals)
2020–2022	Carlton	3 (0)
2022–	Western Bulldogs	0 (0)
Total		3 (0)
- ^{1} Playing statistics correct to the end of the S7 (2022) season.

Brooke Vernon (born 20 October 2001) is an Australian rules footballer who plays for Western Bulldogs in the AFL Women's (AFLW). She has previously played for Carlton.

== Club career ==
Vernon was drafted by Carlton in October 2019. After leaving Carlton in the off-season between the 2022 (A) AFL Women's season and the 2022 (B) AFL Women's season, Vernon was drafted by the Western Bulldogs.
