= Emily Goodsir =

Australian rules footballer

Personal information
- Full name: Emily Goodsir
- Born: 17 June 1992 (age 34)
- Original team: East Coast Eagles (Sydney AFL)
- Draft: No. 76, 2019 national draft
- Debut: Round 6, 2020, Greater Western Sydney vs. Adelaide, at Richmond Oval
- Height: 154 cm (5 ft 1 in)
- Position: Forward

Playing career^{1}
Years	Club	Games (Goals)
2020–S7 (2022)	Greater Western Sydney	15 (0)
- ^{1} Playing statistics correct to the end of the S7 (2022) season.

Emily Goodsir (born 17 June 1992) is an Australian rules footballer who played for Greater Western Sydney in the AFL Women's league.

In March 2023, Goodsir was delisted by Greater Western Sydney.
