= Hannah Burchell =

Australian rules footballer

Hannah Chalkley (Burchell)
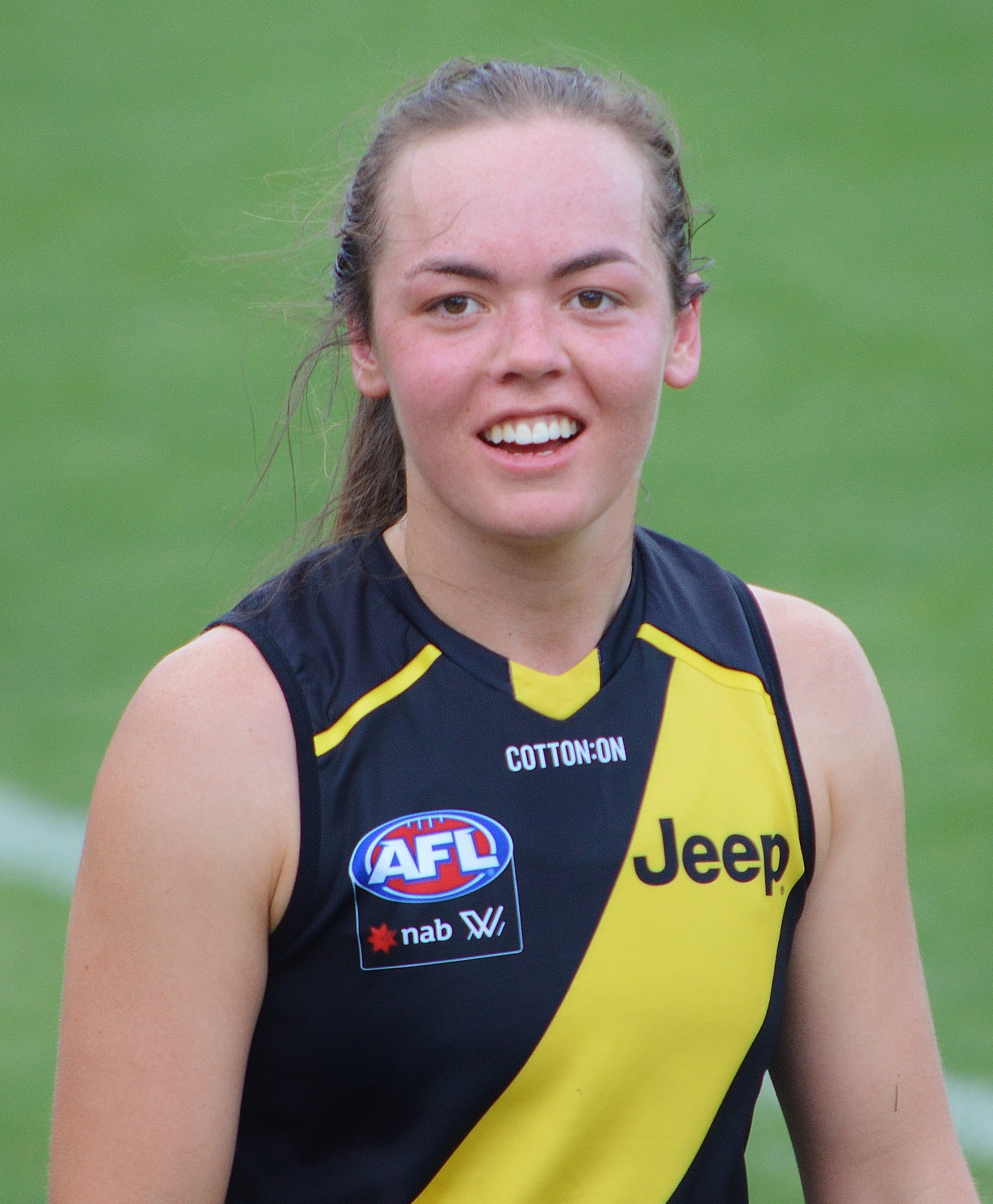
- Burchell with Richmond in February 2020

Personal information
- Born: 25 February 1995 (age 31)
- Original team: Geelong (VFLW)
- Debut: Round 7, 2019, Geelong vs. Greater Western Sydney, at UNSW Canberra Oval
- Height: 170 cm (5 ft 7 in)
- Position: Wing

Playing career^{1}
Years	Club	Games (Goals)
2019	Geelong	1 (0)
2020–2022 (S7)	Richmond	18 (0)
Total		19 (0)
- ^{1} Playing statistics correct to the end of 2022 season 7.

Hannah Burchell (born 25 February 1995) is an Australian rules footballer who played for Geelong and Richmond in the AFL Women's competition (AFLW). She played one game with Geelong in the 2019 season before being delisted by the club and moving to Richmond as a delisted free agent.

== Early life and state-league football ==
Burchell spent her formative years in Ocean Grove, a seaside town 23 kilometres outside Geelong.

She played VFLW football with Geelong in 2017 and 2018.

== AFL Women's career ==
Burchell was signed by Geelong as a pre-listed free agent in August 2018.

She made her AFLW debut during round 7 of the 2019 season in a match against Greater Western Sydney at UNSW Canberra Oval. She was omitted from the Geelong side that played in a losing preliminary final the following week. At season's end she was delisted by Geelong, having played just one AFLW match. Burchell joined expansion club Richmond as delisted free agent later that month.

In December 2022, Burchell was delisted by Richmond after spending 2022 season 7 on the injury list.

== Statistics ==
Statistics are correct to end of 2022 season 7.

Legend
G	Goals	K	Kicks	D	Disposals	T	Tackles
B	Behinds	H	Handballs	M	Marks

Season	Team	No.	Games	Totals							Averages (per game)						
Season	Team	No.	Games	G	B	K	H	D	M	T	G	B	K	H	D	M	T
2019	Geelong	3	1	0	0	6	2	8	2	1	0.0	0.0	6.0	2.0	8.0	2.0	1.0
2020	Richmond	9	6	0	0	24	14	38	10	8	0.0	0.0	4.0	2.3	6.3	1.7	1.3
2021	Richmond	9	8	0	1	47	28	75	21	14	0.0	0.1	5.9	3.5	9.4	2.6	1.8
2022 (S6)	Richmond	9	4	0	0	11	11	22	3	6	0.0	0.0	2.8	2.8	5.5	0.8	1.5
2022 (S7)	Richmond	9	0	—	—	—	—	—	—	—	—	—	—	—	—	—	—
Career			19	0	1	88	55	143	36	29	0.0	0.1	4.6	2.9	7.5	1.9	1.5
