= Tahni Nestor =

Australian rules footballer

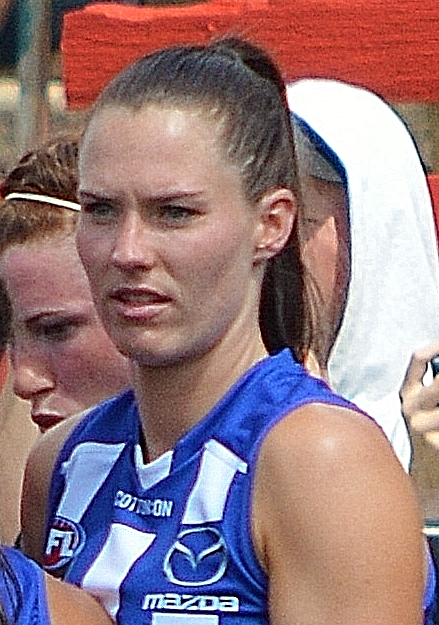
- Nestor with North Melbourne in February 2020

Personal information
- Born: 3 March 1991 (age 35)
- Original team: Eastern Devils VFL Women's
- Debut: Round 4, 2017, Carlton vs. Melbourne, at Casey Fields
- Height: 175 cm (5 ft 9 in)
- Position: Defender

Playing career^{1}
Years	Club	Games (Goals)
2017	Carlton	3 (0)
2020–2021	North Melbourne	9 (0)
Total		12 (0)
- ^{1} Playing statistics correct to the end of the 2021 season.

Tahni Nestor (born 3 March 1991) is an Australian rules footballer who played for Carlton and North Melbourne in the AFL Women's (AFLW) competition.

== AFLW career ==
Nestor recruited by Carlton as an injury replacement player midway through the 2017 season. She made her debut in the fourth round of the season against Melbourne at Casey Fields. She was delisted at season's end after having played three matches at AFLW level. In 2019, Nestor was drafted by North Melbourne. After playing nine games in two seasons at the club, she was delisted in June 2021.
