= Nadia von Bertouch =

Australian rules footballer

Personal information
- Full name: Nadia von Bertouch
- Born: 28 August 1995 (age 31)
- Original team: North Adelaide (SANFLW)
- Debut: Round 1, 2020, St Kilda vs. Western Bulldogs, at RSEA Park
- Height: 176 cm (5 ft 9 in)
- Position: Forward

Playing career^{1}
Years	Club	Games (Goals)
2020–2021	St Kilda	6 (0)
- ^{1} Playing statistics correct to the end of the 2021 season.

Nadia von Bertouch (/ˈbɜːrtoʊ/ BUR-toh; born 28 August 1995) is an Australian rules footballer who played for St Kilda in the AFL Women's (AFLW). In March 2021, she was delisted by St Kilda.
