= Annalyse Lister =

Australian rules footballer

Personal information
- Born: 26 April 1990 (age 36)
- Original team: Darebin Falcons (VFLW)
- Draft: No. 29, 2019 AFL Women's draft
- Debut: Round 1, 2020, Greater Western Sydney vs. Gold Coast, at Blacktown ISP Oval
- Height: 171 cm (5 ft 7 in)
- Position: Midfielder

Club information
- Current club: Greater Western Sydney
- Number: 14

Playing career^{1}
Years	Club	Games (Goals)
2020–	Greater Western Sydney	37 (1)
- ^{1} Playing statistics correct to the end of the 2023 season.

Annalyse Lister (born 26 April 1990) is an Australian rules footballer playing for the Greater Western Sydney Giants in the AFL Women's (AFLW). Lister was drafted by GWS with their third selection and twenty-ninth overall in the 2019 AFL Women's draft. She made her debut against Gold Coast at Blacktown ISP Oval in the opening round of the 2020 season.

Lister is currently studying a Master of Business Administration at Deakin University.
