= Sarah Halvorsen =

Female Australian rules footballer

Personal information
- Full name: Sarah Halvorsen
- Born: 13 August 1995 (age 31)
- Original team: Newcastle City (AFL Hunter Central Coast)
- Draft: No. 61, 2019 national draft
- Debut: Round 5, 2020, Greater Western Sydney vs. Richmond, at Robertson Oval
- Height: 181 cm (5 ft 11 in)
- Position: Forward

Playing career^{1}
Years	Club	Games (Goals)
2020–2021	Greater Western Sydney	4 (1)
- ^{1} Playing statistics correct to the end of the 2021 season.

Sarah Halvorsen (born 13 August 1995) is an Australian rules footballer who played for Greater Western Sydney in the AFL Women's (AFLW).
