= Lisa Steane =

Australian rules footballer

Personal information
- Full name: Lisa Steane
- Born: 21 January 1995 (age 31)
- Original team: Nelson Bay (AFL Hunter Central Coast)
- Draft: No. 23, 2019 national draft
- Debut: Round 2, 2020, Greater Western Sydney vs. North Melbourne, at UTAS Stadium
- Height: 166 cm (5 ft 5 in)
- Positions: Defender, wing

Playing career^{1}
Years	Club	Games (Goals)
2020–2022	Greater Western Sydney	19 (0)
S7 (2022)–2024	Sydney	27 (0)
2025–	West Coast	1 (0)
Total		47 (0)
- ^{1} Playing statistics correct to the end of the 2025 season.

Lisa Steane (born 21 January 1995) is an Australian rules footballer who played for West Coast in the AFL Women's (AFLW) and Subiaco in the WAFL Women's. She previously played for Sydney and Greater Western Sydney.

== Early life ==
Steane was born and raised in Nelson Bay, New South Wales. She played her junior football with the Nelson Bay Football Club in the AFL Hunter Central Coast competition. She moved to Sydney to pursue her dream to play AFLW, where she was a primary school teacher before being drafted.

== AFLW career ==
In October 2019, Steane joined Greater Western Sydney. In May 2022, Steane joined expansion club and rival club Sydney. In August, she was named in the Swans' inaugural AFLW leadership group before playing 8 games in their first season.

Steane cemented her position on the wing in 2023, playing all 12 games for the season. She played a key role in Sydney's maiden AFLW final with 19 disposals and 5 tackles in the 17-point win over Gold Coast.

In 2025 Steane moved to Perth with her partner Bella Smith, who had been traded to Fremantle. She played for Subiaco in the WAFL Women's league. She was selected to represent Western Australia against South Australia in May 2025 winning the best player medal. In September 2025, Steane was called up as a top up player by West Coast when two players withdrew due to illness.
