= Wilston Grange Football Club =

Wilston Grange Gorillas

Names
- Full name: Wilston Grange Australian Football Club
- Nickname: Gorillas
- Club song: Good Old Wilston Grange Forever

2026 QAFL season
- Home-and-away season: 12th

Club details
- Founded: 1945; 81 years ago
- Colours
- Competition: Queensland Australian Football League
- President: Craig Telfer
- Coach: Brent Moloney
- Premierships: QAFL: 3 (1955, 1969, 1972)
- Ground: Hickey Park (capacity: 5,000)

Uniforms
Home

Other information
- Official website: gorillas.com.au

The Wilston Grange Football Club is an Australian rules football club which competes in the Queensland Australian Football League. It is based in inner-northern Brisbane and fields senior men's and women's, masters, youth and junior teams. The club's home at Hickey Park, Stafford, also hosts the largest AFL9s league in Queensland.

== History ==
Wilston Grange was formed in 1945 as "Wilston Football Club", renamed Wilston Grange in 1947 and entered the QANFL in 1950. Their original home ground was Emerson Park, Grange, and the club relocated to Hickey Park for the 1964 season. That year, VFL superstar Ron Barassi was the guest of honour at the opening of the oval, which was broadcast live on Brisbane radio.

An earlier Wilston Football Club had operated from the early 1930s to 1939 but ceased operation over the war years.

The Wilston Grange club colours are royal blue, red and white. The Gorillas, as they are known, made five Grand Finals in the league for premierships in 1955, 1969 and 1972. The Gorillas' 1969 premiership was remarkable in that they had finished next to last the previous season. The 1972 team was coached by the legendary Alan Killigrew and won the Grand Final by a record 84 points, defeating Sandgate. Champion players over the years have included Fred Coulthurst, Allan Ahlberg, Ken Grimley, Jim Conlon, Keith Leach, Syd Guildford, Barry Clarke and Scott McIvor. High flying full forward Steve Taylor notched a century of goals in four consecutive seasons from 1969 to 1972.

At the end of the 1989 season, Wilston Grange and Kedron merged to form the Kedron Grange Football Club. The club played for seven seasons in this form, losing the 1994 Grand Final to Morningside by two points.

At the end of 1996 the merged club collapsed. Both parties to the merger relied on their junior clubs to continue in junior competitions.

Wilston Grange had recommenced senior football operations in 1995 with full links to the Kedron Grange operation. The new lower based level club won the AFL Queensland State League Division 2 Grand Final in 1997. In the following years they competed in several restructured AFL Queensland competitions being promoted through success on field and strong facility development at Hickey Park.

The club was re-admitted to the QAFL State League in 2014, bringing top level football back to Hickey Park. An women's team was established by the club in 2014 which competes in the QWAFL State League.

== Honours ==
=== Club ===
- Queensland Australian Football League (3): 1955, 1969, 1972

=== Individual ===
Grogan Medalists (5)

- Jim Conlon - 1960
- Keith Leach - 1961, 1962
- Merv Appleyard - 1968
- Ken Garcia - 1969
- Barry Clarke - 1972, 1976
- Dean Warren - 1993

AFLQ Team of Century Members (4)

- Keith Leach
- Ken Grimley
- Barry Clarke
- Scott McIvor

AFLQ Hall of Fame Members (11)

- Keith Leach
- Ken Grimley
- Barry Clarke
- Scott McIvor
- Merv Appleyard
- Syd Guildford
- Graham Jewell
- Clint Bizzell
- Dean Warren (Administration)
- Ralph Geschke (Coaching)
- Ron Lockens (Photographic Library)

Ray Hughson Medalist - Leading Goal Kicker (11)

- Ken Grimley 1956
- Les Periera 1961
- Steve Taylor 1969, 1970, 1971, 1972
- Barry Clarke 1978
- Brett Grimley 1987
