= Hickey Park =

Sports venue in Stafford, Queensland

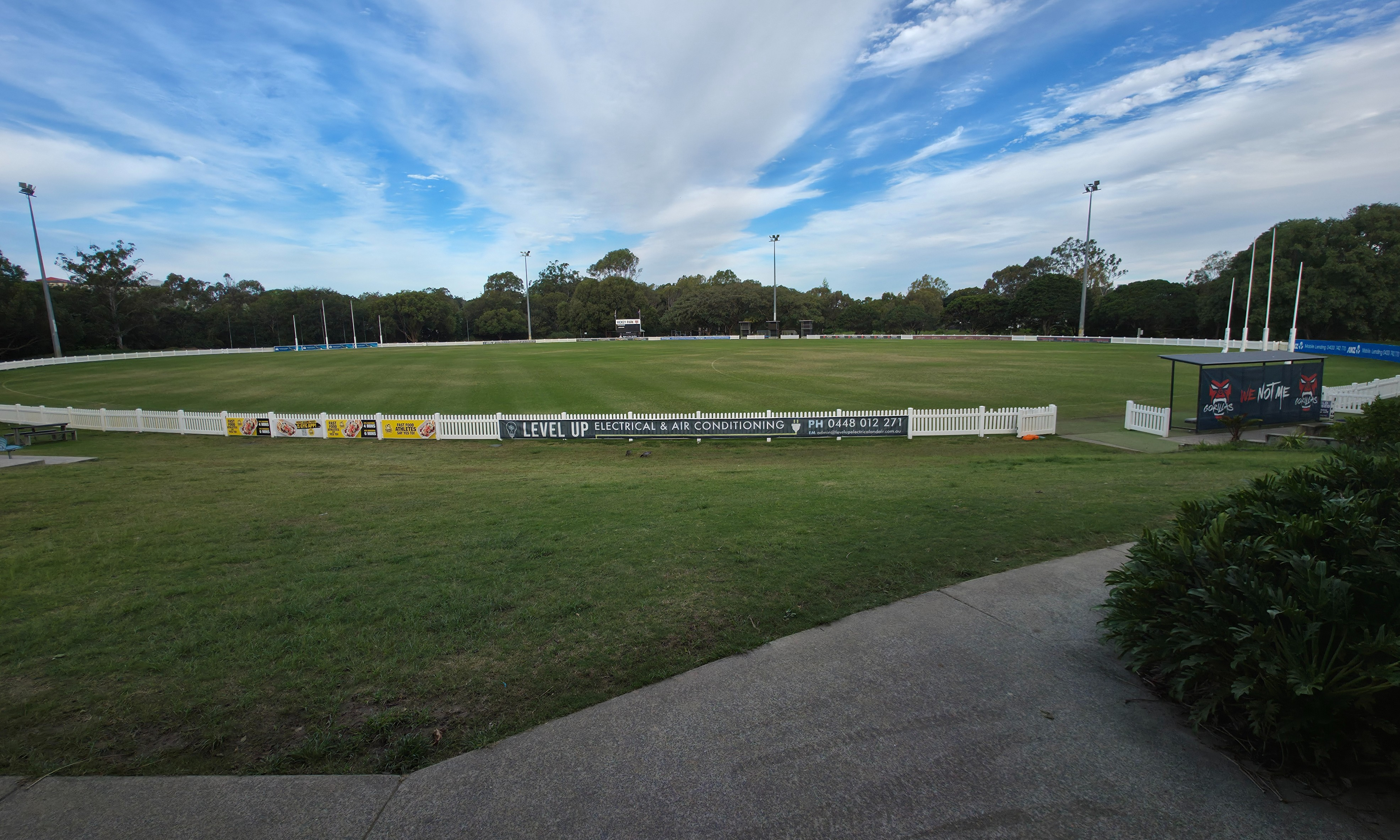
- Interactive map of Hickey Park
- Location: Stafford, Queensland
- Coordinates: 27.4158°S 153.0204°E
- Capacity: 4,000
- Record attendance: 4,227 (Brisbane vs Melbourne, 17 February 2019)

Tenant
- Wilston Grange Football Club (1964–)

Hickey Park is an Australian rules football venue located in the Brisbane suburb of Stafford. It is the home of the Wilston Grange Football Club in the Queensland Australian Football League (QAFL).

Wilston Grange moved from Emerson Park to Hickey Park for the 1964 season. Victorian footballer Ron Barassi was the guest of honour at the opening of the new ground.

The venue hosted five Brisbane Lions matches in the AFL Women's (AFLW) competition between 2019 and 2021.
