= 2021 Richmond Football Club season =

114th Richmond Football Club season

Richmond Football Club
2021 season
- President: Peggy O'Neal^{(8th season)}
- Coach: AFL: Damien Hardwick^{(12th season)} AFLW: Ryan Ferguson^{(1st season)}
- Captains: AFL: Trent Cotchin^{(9th season)} AFLW: Katie Brennan^{(2nd season)}
- Home ground: AFL: MCG; AFLW: Swinburne Centre
- Pre-season: AFL: 1-0
- AFL season: AFL: 12th (9-12-1); AFLW: 10th (3-6)
- 2021 AFL finals series: AFL: DNQ; AFLW: DNQ
- Jack Dyer Medal: AFL: Dylan Grimes; AFLW: Monique Conti
- Leading goalkicker: AFL: Jack Riewoldt (51); AFLW: Katie Brennan (14)

The 2021 season was the 114th season in which the Richmond Football Club has participated in the VFL/AFL and the second season in which it participated in the AFL Women's competition.

== AFL ==
=== 2020 off-season list changes ===
==== Retirements and delistings ====
Player	Reason	Club games	Career games	Ref
Derek Eggmolesse-Smith	Delisted	8	8	
Luke English	Delisted	0	0	
Fraser Turner	Delisted	0	0	

==== Trades ====
Date	Gained	Lost	Trade partner	Ref
4 November	2021 third-round pick	Oleg Markov	Gold Coast	
12 November	Pick 17	Jack Higgins	St Kilda	
12 November	2021 second-round pick	Pick 21	St Kilda	
12 November	2021 second-round pick	2021 fourth-round pick	St Kilda	
9 December	2021 first-round pick	Pick 20	Geelong	

==== National draft ====
Round	Overall pick	Player	State	Position	Team from	League from	Ref
2	40	Samson Ryan	QLD	Ruck	Western Magpies	QAFL	
3	51	Maurice Rioli Jr.	NT	Small forward	Oakleigh Chargers	NAB League Boys	

==== Rookie draft ====
Round	Overall pick	Player	State	Position	Team from	League from	Ref
–	–	Mate Colina^{(B)}	VIC	Ruck	3-year non-registered player		

=== Pre-season supplemental selection period ===
Date	Player	Team from	League from	Ref
18 February 2021	Rhyan Mansell	Woodville West Torrens	SANFL	
9 March 2021	Derek Eggmolesse-Smith	Richmond	AFL	

=== Mid-season draft ===
Pick	Player	Position	Team from	League from	Ref
10	Matthew Parker	Midfielder/Forward	South Fremantle	WAFL	

=== 2021 squad ===
Richmond Football Club
Senior list		Rookie list	Coaching staff
1 Nick Vlastuin; 2 Dylan Grimes; 3 Dion Prestia; 4 Dustin Martin; 5 Jack Ross; 6 Patrick Naish; 7 Liam Baker; 8 Jack Riewoldt (vc); 9 Trent Cotchin (c); 10 Shane Edwards; 11 Jason Castagna; 12 David Astbury; 14 Bachar Houli; 15 Jayden Short; 17 Daniel Rioli; 19 Tom Lynch; 20 Ivan Soldo; 21 Noah Balta; 22 Josh Caddy; 23 Kane Lambert	25 Toby Nankervis; 26 Riley Collier-Dawkins; 27 Thomson Dow; 29 Shai Bolton; 32 Samson Ryan; 33 Kamdyn McIntosh; 34 Jack Graham; 35 Nathan Broad; 36 Will Martyn; 38 Noah Cumberland; 40 Callum Coleman-Jones; 41 Mabior Chol; 42 Ryan Garthwaite; 45 Hugo Ralphsmith; 47 Bigoa Nyuon; 49 Maurice Rioli Jr.	16 Jake Aarts; 31 Rhyan Mansell; 37 Matthew Parker; 39 Mate Colina (B); 43 Derek Eggmolesse-Smith; 44 Sydney Stack; 46 Ben Miller; 50 Marlion Pickett	Head coach: Damien Hardwick; Assistant coaches: Adam Kingsley (defense); Andrew McQualter (forwards/ball movement); Sam Lonergan (midfield); Xavier Clarke (VFL/midfield); Ivan Maric (ruck); Legend: (c) Captain(s); (vc) Vice-captain(s); (B) Category B rookie; Updated: 15 September 2021; Source(s): Senior list, Rookie list, Coaching staff

=== 2021 season ===
==== Pre-season community series ====
Date	Score	Opponent	Opponent's score	Result	Home/away	Venue	Attendance
Friday 5 March, 7:10pm	11.14 (80)	Collingwood	11.8 (74)	Won by 6 points	Home	Marvel Stadium	10,308

==== Home and away season ====
Round	Date	Score	Opponent	Opponent's score	Result	Home/away	Venue	Attendance	Ladder
1	Thursday 18 March, 7:25pm	15.15 (105)	Carlton	11.14 (80)	Won by 25 points	Home	MCG	49,218	5th
2	Sunday 28 March, 1:10pm	11.12 (78)	Hawthorn	7.7 (49)	Won by 29 points	Away	MCG	41,051	2nd
3	Saturday 3 April, 1:45pm	10.12 (72)	Sydney	17.15 (117)	Lost by 45 points	Home	MCG	43,637	6th
4	Friday 9 April, 7:20pm	11.11 (77)	Port Adelaide	11.13 (79)	Lost by 2 points	Away	Adelaide Oval	33,742	8th
5	Thursday 15 April 7:20pm	20.14 (134)	St Kilda	7.6 (48)	Won by 86 points	Away	Marvel Stadium	32,056	5th
6	Saturday 24 April, 7:25pm	6.12 (48)	Melbourne	12.10 (82)	Lost by 34 points	Away	MCG	56,418	7th
7	Friday 30 April, 7:50pm	11.11 (77)	Western Bulldogs	7.13 (55)	Won by 22 points	Home	MCG	52,402	6th
8	Friday 7 May, 7:50pm	9.9 (63)	Geelong	19.12 (126)	Lost by 63 points	Home	MCG	54,857	8th
9	Saturday 15 May, 7:25pm	13.9 (87)	Greater Western Sydney	12.11 (83)	Won by 4 points	Home	Docklands Stadium	18,798	8th
10	Friday 21 May, 7:50pm	11.8 (74)	Brisbane Lions	15.12 (102)	Lost by 28 points	Away	The Gabba	31,127	9th
11	Sunday 30 May, 2:10pm	17.8 (111)	Adelaide	12.11 (87)	Won by 24 points	Home/Neutral	Giants Stadium	4,236	8th
12	Saturday 5 June, 7:25pm	19.9 (123)	Essendon	12.12 (84)	Won by 39 points	Away/Neutral	Optus Stadium	56,656	8th
13	Sunday 13 June, 5:20pm	12.9 (81)	West Coast	13.7 (85)	Lost by 4 points	Away	Optus Stadium	50,834	8th
14	BYE								8th
15	Friday 25 June, 7:50pm	2.10 (22)	St Kilda	9.8 (62)	Lost by 40 points	Home	MCG	14,787	8th
16	Thursday 1 July, 7:20pm	10.7 (67)	Gold Coast	10.17 (77)	Lost by 10 points	Away/Neutral	Marvel Stadium	9,327	9th
17	Sunday 11 July, 4:10pm	11.5 (71)	Collingwood	13.9 (87)	Lost by 16 points	Home	MCG	29,437	12th
18	Friday 16 July, 8:05pm	16.10 (106)	Brisbane Lions	13.8 (86)	Won by 20 points	Home/Neutral	Metricon Stadium	4,119	9th
19	Sunday 25 July, 3:20pm	8.9 (57)	Geelong	15.5 (95)	Lost by 38 points	Away	MCG	0	10th
20	Sunday 1 August, 6:10pm	6.15 (51)	Fremantle	7.13 (55)	Lost by 4 points	Away	Optus Stadium	24,979	11th
21	Saturday 7 August, 4:35pm	13.11 (89)	North Melbourne	8.8 (56)	Won by 43 points	Home	MCG	0	10th
22	Friday 13 August, 7:50pm	10.7 (67)	Greater Western Sydney	16.10 (106)	Lost by 39 points	Away/Neutral	Marvel Stadium	0	11th
23	Saturday 21 August, 1:35pm	12.11 (83)	Hawthorn	12.11 (83)	Draw	Home	MCG	0	12th

=== Awards ===
==== League awards ====
===== 22 Under 22 team =====
	Player	Position	Appearance
Nominated	Shai Bolton	–	–

==== Club awards ====
===== Jack Dyer Medal =====
Position	Player	Votes	Medal
1st	Dylan Grimes	51	Jack Dyer Medal
2nd	Jack Graham	46	Jack Titus Medal
2nd	Liam Baker	46	Jack Titus Medal
4th	Shai Bolton	45	Fred Swift Medal
5th	Dustin Martin	40	Kevin Bartlett Medal
5th	Jack Riewoldt	40	Kevin Bartlett Medal
7th	Jayden Short	39	
8th	Tom Lynch	38	
9th	Kane Lambert	35	
10th	Trent Cotchin	33	
10th	Nathan Broad	33	

===== Michael Roach Medal =====
Position	Player	Goals
1st	Jack Riewoldt	51
2nd	Tom Lynch	35
3rd	Shai Bolton	23
4th	Dustin Martin	19
5th	Jake Aarts	18

== AFL Women's ==
=== 2020 off-season list changes ===
==== Special assistance ====
After poor on-field performances in 2020, the AFL decided to award special assistance to Richmond in the form of an end-of-first round draft (originally number 15 overall) selection which the club was required to on-trade to another club in exchange for an established player. The pick was eventually traded to acquire Carlton midfielder Sarah Hosking.

==== Retirements and delistings ====
Player	Reason	Club games	Career games	Ref
Laura Bailey	Retired	5	13	
Lauren Tesoriero	Retired	4	15	
Ella Wood	Retired	3	3	
Nekaela Butler	Delisted	0	0	
Ciara Fitzgerald	Delisted	0	0	
Emma Horne	Delisted	0	0	

==== Trades ====
Date	Gained	Lost	Trade partner	Ref
3 August	Sarah Hosking	Pick 15	Carlton	
3 August	Pick 43	Grace Campbell	North Melbourne	
4 August	Harriet Cordner	Pick 17	Melbourne	
4 August	Sarah D'Arcy	Pick 31	Collingwood	
4 August	Sarah Dargan	Pick 45	Collingwood	

==== National draft ====
Round	Overall pick	Player	Position	Team from	League from	Ref
1	1	Ellie McKenzie	Midfielder / wing	Northern Knights	NAB League	
3	43	Tessa Lavey	–	–	–	
5	52	Luka Lesosky-Hay	Midfielder	Geelong Falcons	NAB League	

=== 2020 squad ===
Richmond Football Club (AFL Women's)
Senior list		Inactive list	Coaching staff
1 Sophie Molan; 2 Phoebe Monahan; 3 Katie Brennan; 4 Monique Conti; 5 Maddy Brancatisano; 6 Christina Bernardi; 7 Sarah Hosking; 8 Courtney Wakefield; 9 Hannah Burchell; 10 Kodi Jacques; 11 Alice Edmonds; 12 Sarah D'Arcy; 13 Alana Woodward; 14 Sabrina Frederick; 15 Rebecca Miller	16 Laura McClelland; 17 Sarah Dargan; 18 Sarah Sansonetti; 19 Kate Dempsey; 21 Iilish Ross; 22 Ellie McKenzie; 23 Harriet Cordner; 24 Tayla Stahl; 25 Cleo Saxon-Jones; 26 Luka Lesosky-Hay; 27 Emily Harley; 28 Gabby Seymour; 29 Hannah McLaren; 34 Akec Makur Chuot; 37 Tessa Lavey	20 Holly Whitford	Head coach: Ryan Ferguson; Assistant coaches: Andrew Browne (midfield/stoppages); Lauren Tesoriero (backline); Nathan Chapman (forwards); Legend: (c) Captain(s); (vc) Vice-captain(s)

=== 2021 season ===
==== Home and away season ====
Round	Date	Score	Opponent	Opponent's score	Result	Home/away	Venue	Attendance	Ladder (of 14)
1	Sunday 31 January, 2:10pm	1.6 (12)	Brisbane	5.11 (41)	Lost by 29 points	Home	Swinburne Centre	988	13th
2	Saturday 6 February, 5:10pm	2.4 (16)	Melbourne	7.2 (44)	Lost by 28 points	Away	Casey Fields	2,581	12th
3	Sunday 14 February, 3:10pm	4.7 (31)	Collingwood	7.6 (48)	Lost by 17 points	Home	Swinburne Centre	0	11th
4	Saturday 20 February, 3:10pm	7.4 (46)	Carlton	8.3 (51)	Lost by 5 points	Away	Ikon Park	2,212	11th
5	Friday 26 February, 7:10pm	9.6 (60)	Geelong	2.1 (13)	Won by 47 points	Away	GMHBA Stadium	1,829	11th
6	Friday 5 March, 5:10pm	5.2 (32)	North Melbourne	10.7 (67)	Lost by 35 points	Home	Swinburn Centre	803	11th
7	Friday 12 March, 6:40pm	6.5 (41)	Gold Coast	4.2 (26)	Won by 15 points	Away	Metricon Stadium	907	10th
8	Sunday 21 March, 12:40pm	5.12 (42)	West Coast	5.4 (34)	Won by 8 points	Home	Swinburne Centre	619	10th
9	Friday 26 March, 5:10pm	5.2 (32)	Western Bulldogs	7.3 (45)	Lost by 13 points	Away	VU Whitten Oval	1,985	10th

=== Awards ===
==== League awards ====
===== AFLW Players' Association Best First-Year Player =====
Player
Ellie McKenzie

===== All-Australian team =====
	Player	Position	Appearance
Named	Katie Brennan	Centre half-forward	1st
Named	Monique Conti	Wing	2nd
Nominated	Harriet Cordner	-	-
Nominated	Ellie McKenzie	-	-

===== 22 Under 22 team =====
	Player	Position	Appearance
Named	Monique Conti	Wing	2nd
Named	Ellie McKenzie	Ruck rover	1st

==== Club awards ====
===== Best and Fairest award =====
Position	Player	Votes
1st	Monique Conti	16
2nd	Katie Brennan	15
2nd	Ellie McKenzie	15
4th	Harriet Cordner	14
5th	Rebecca Miller	13
6th	Gabby Seymour	12
7th	Sarah Hosking	10
7th	Sarah D'Arcy	10
9th	Maddy Brancatisano	7
10th	Courtney Wakefield	6
10th	Tayla Stahl	6
10th	Iilish Ross	6

===== Leading goalkicker award =====
Position	Player	Goals
1st	Katie Brennan	14
2nd	Courtney Wakefield	10
3rd	Tayla Stahl	7
4th	Christina Bernardi	4
4th	Ellie McKenzie	4

== Victorian Football League (men's reserves) ==
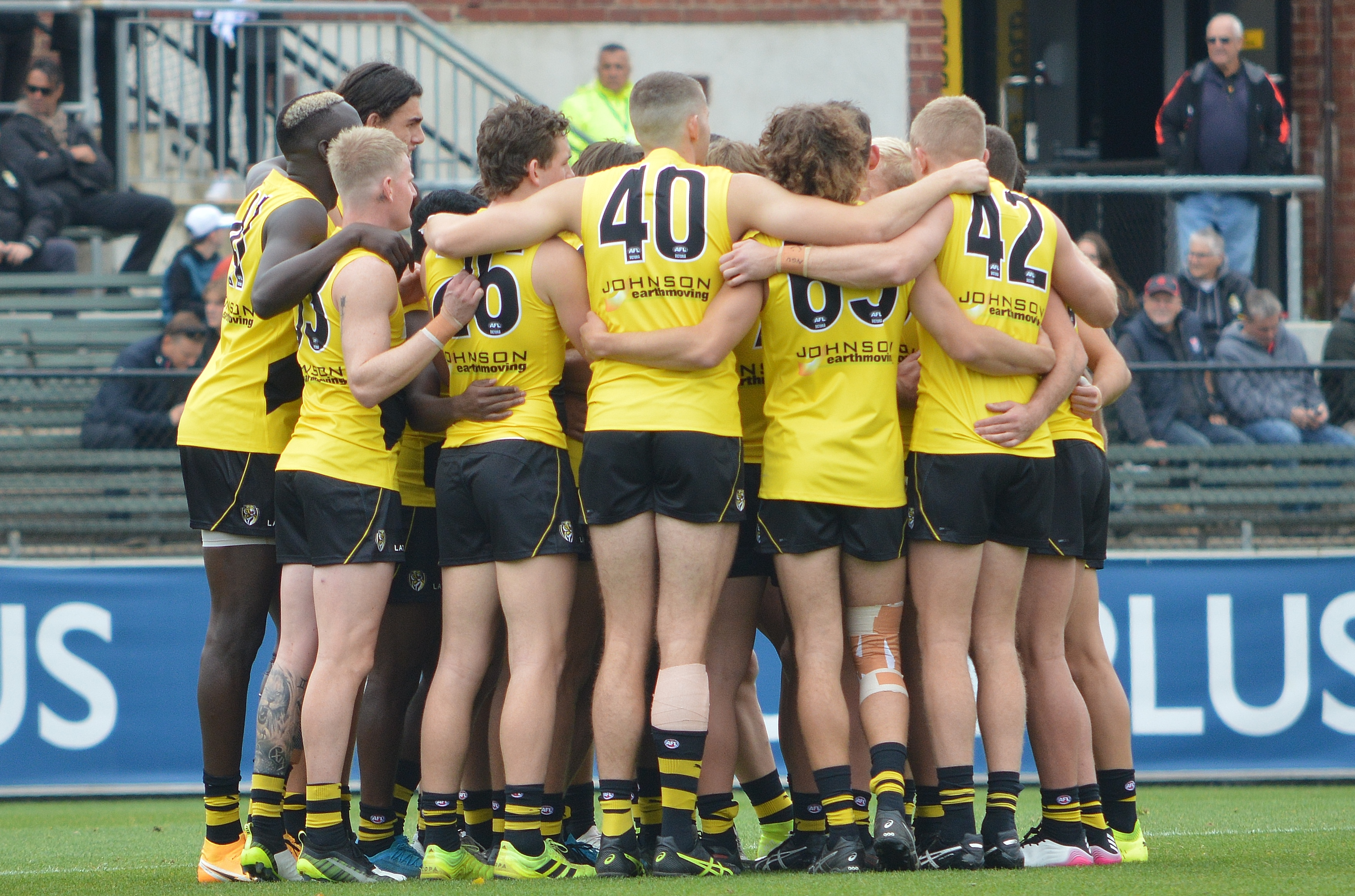
Richmond VFL's team in April 2021

The 2021 season will mark the seventh year the Richmond Football Club run a stand-alone reserves team in the Victorian Football League/Eastern Australian league. Richmond senior and rookie-listed players who are not selected to play in the AFL side will be eligible to play for the team alongside a small squad of VFL/EAFL-only listed players.

The team finished the home and away season with four wins, one draw and five losses. AFL listed midfielder Will Martyn won the team's best and fairest award and Samson Ryan won the club's goal kicking award with 17 goals from nine matches.

=== Playing squad ===
Richmond Football Club (reserves)
Playing list		Coaching staff
51 Steve Morris (c); 52 Angus Hicks; 53 Garret McDonagh; 54 Brad Melville; 55 Lachlan Street; 56 Riley Loton; 57 Nathan Oakes; 58 Cam Olden; 59 Sam Tucker	60 Karl Worner; 61 Flynn Maguire; 62 Nick Guiney; 63 Dylan Cook; 64 Sam Durham; 65 Joel Nathan; 66 Bailey Henderson; 67 Fraser Elliot; 68 Matt Bartlett	Head coach: Xavier Clarke; Legend: (c) Captain(s); (vc) Vice-captain(s); Updated: 23 October 2026; Source(s): Playing list, Coaching staff

== VFLW (women's reserves) ==
After running a stand-alone VFLW team since 2018, Richmond elected not to renew the club's license to participate in the 2021 season. Instead, Richmond players represented Port Melbourne under an alignment model. The season ran concurrently with part of the AFLW season for the first time, meaning unselected AFLW players took part in VFLW football as a reserves-grade competition. After the end of the AFLW season, players from the senior side also took part in matches for the club, including into the final series.

Port Melbourne finished the 14-game season with 10 wins and four losses, placing third on the ladder. The club was eliminated in the first round of the finals, following a 3.5 (23) to 7.15 (57) elimination final loss to the Southern Saints at ETU Stadium.
