= 2020 Richmond Football Club season =

Richmond Football Club
2020 season
- President: Peggy O'Neal^{(7th season)}
- Coach: AFL: Damien Hardwick^{(11th season)} AFLW: Tom Hunter^{(1st season)}
- Captains: AFL: Trent Cotchin^{(8th season)} AFLW: Katie Brennan^{(1st season)}
- Home ground: AFL: MCG; AFLW: Princes Park
- Pre-season: AFL: (0-2); AFLW: DNP
- AFL season: AFL: 3rd (12-1-4); AFLW: (0-6)
- AFL finals: AFL: 1st AFLW: DNP
- Best & fairest: AFL: Jayden Short; AFLW: Monique Conti
- Leading goalkicker: AFL: Jack Riewoldt^{(33)} AFLW: Courtney Wakefield^{(4)}
- Highest home attendance: AFLW: 15,337^{(Round 1 vs. Carlton)}
- Lowest home attendance: AFLW: 3,697^{(Round 3 vs. North Melbourne)}
- Average home attendance: AFLW: 9,517
- Club membership: 100,420

The 2020 season was the 113th season in which the Richmond Football Club has participated in the VFL/AFL and the first season in which it participated in the AFL Women's competition.

== Impact of COVID-19 pandemic ==
The 2020 season was disrupted by the COVID-19 pandemic, which was formally declared a pandemic on 11 March 2020, eight days prior to the scheduled start of the AFL premiership season and 18 days prior to the final round of the AFL season.

=== AFL ===
Prior to the commencement of the season, the fixture was shortened from 22 matches per team to 17, under the expectation that matches would be forced to stop at the peak of the disease.

The season commenced on 19 March as originally scheduled, but the introduction of restrictions (and later of formal quarantines) on interstate travel, resulted in suspension of the season after round one. During that round, matches were played in empty stadiums for the first time in the league's history.

Throughout the season, matches were played for a shortened length of 16 minutes plus time on per quarter, instead of 20 minutes plus time on. This was originally done at the start of the season, in the hope that playing shorter games could facilitate more frequent games than weekly, maximising the games which could be played before the anticipated suspension of the season. Though the initial run of games lasted just one week, the shortened game time was retained after the season's resumption to allow make-up games to be more easily scheduled between rounds when matches were postponed or refixtured.

On 15 May, as most states began easing restrictions, the league's plan to resume the season was announced: clubs began non-contact training from 18 May, and full contact training from 25 May, ahead of resuming competitive matches from 11 June, with the revised fixture released gradually throughout the year, and changing regularly and often at short notice when the situation forced it.

The sizes of allowable crowds changed as the season progressed, with early season Queensland and New South Wales crowds limited to only a few hundred, while half crowds were allowed in the largely virus-free Western Australia from Round 7.

Following a virus outbreak in Melbourne in June, Richmond's base of operations was relocated to the Gold Coast, alongside eight other Victorian clubs. The club played the remainder of their home games in the state, other than when travelling to other virus-free locations.

=== AFLW ===
In the AFLW, all matches played from 14 March onwards were played to empty stadiums. The final two rounds of the home-and-away season were scratched and though Richmond did not qualify, the finals series was brought forward by two weeks and cancelled without a premier being awarded after just four finals matches were played.

=== VFL and VFLW ===
The final weeks of the VFL pre-season series and the commencement of the season-proper were delayed in March due to the greater risk of external threats in the semi-professional state league environment. Eventually, all AFL clubs withdrew from the competition and the season was cancelled in June. Richmond reserves players participated in ad hoc scratch matches against other clubs during the season and on occasion played in multi-club teams alongside rival players. The VFLW season was likewise delayed and eventually cancelled.

== AFL ==
=== 2019 off-season list changes ===
==== Retirements and delistings ====
Player	Reason	Club games	Career games	Ref
Alex Rance	Retired	200	200	
Shaun Grigg	Retired	171	214	
Mav Weller	Retired	2	123	
Connor Menadue	Delisted	39	39	
Jacob Townsend	Delisted	20	48	
Callum Moore	Delisted	8	8	

==== Free agency ====
Date	Player	Free agent type	Former club	New club	Compensation	Ref
5 October	Brandon Ellis	Restricted	Richmond	Gold Coast	2nd round	

==== Trades ====
Date	Gained	Lost	Trade partner	Ref
16 October	Pick 56	Dan Butler	St Kilda	

==== National draft ====
Round	Overall pick	Player	State	Position	Team from	League from	Ref
1	21	Thomson Dow	VIC	Midfielder	Bendigo Pioneers	NAB League	
2	43	Noah Cumberland	QLD	Forward	Brisbane Lions academy	NEAFL	
2	44	Will Martyn	QLD	Midfielder/Wing	Brisbane Lions academy	NEAFL	
3	46	Hugo Ralphsmith	VIC	Wing/Forward	Sandringham Dragons	NAB League	
3	54	Bigoa Nyuon	VIC	Defender	Dandenong Stingrays	NAB League	

=== 2020 squad ===
Richmond Football Club
Senior list		Rookie list	Coaching staff
1 Nick Vlastuin; 2 Dylan Grimes; 3 Dion Prestia; 4 Dustin Martin; 5 Jack Ross; 6 Patrick Naish; 8 Jack Riewoldt (vc); 9 Trent Cotchin (c); 10 Shane Edwards; 11 Jason Castagna; 12 David Astbury; 13 Jack Higgins; 14 Bachar Houli; 15 Jayden Short; 17 Daniel Rioli; 19 Tom Lynch; 20 Ivan Soldo; 21 Noah Balta; 22 Josh Caddy	23 Kane Lambert; 25 Toby Nankervis; 26 Riley Collier-Dawkins; 27 Thomson Dow; 28 Fraser Turner; 29 Shai Bolton; 31 Oleg Markov; 32 Luke English; 33 Kamdyn McIntosh; 34 Jack Graham; 35 Nathan Broad; 36 Will Martyn; 38 Noah Cumberland; 40 Callum Coleman-Jones; 42 Ryan Garthwaite; 45 Hugo Ralphsmith; 46 Ben Miller; 47 Bigoa Nyuon	7 Liam Baker; 39 Jake Aarts; 41 Mabior Chol; 43 Derek Eggmolesse-Smith; 44 Sydney Stack; 50 Marlion Pickett	Head coach: Damien Hardwick; Assistant coaches: Justin Leppitsch (backline/defence); Adam Kingsley (midfield/stoppage); Andrew McQualter (midfield/offensive); Craig McRae (forwards); Xavier Clarke (VFL/development forwards); Ryan Ferguson (development/VFL backline); Sam Lonergan (development/VFL midfield); Ivan Maric (ruck); Legend: (c) Captain(s); (vc) Vice-captain(s); (B) Category B rookie; italics - Inactive player list; Long-term injury; (ret.) Retired; Updated: 17 December 2020; Source(s): Senior list, Rookie list, Coaching staff

=== 2020 season ===
==== Marsh Community Series ====
Match	Date	Score	Opponent	Opponent's score	Result	Home/away	Venue	Attendance
1	Sunday 1 March, 4:00pm	6.8 (44)	Collingwood	13.6 (84)	Lost by 40 points	Home	Norm Minns Oval, Wangaratta	-
2	Sunday 8 March, 12:40pm	14.11 (95)	Greater Western Sydney	17.7 (109)	Lost by 14 points	Away	Robertson Oval, Wagga Wagga	6,556

==== Home and away season ====
Round	Date	Score	Opponent	Opponent's score	Result	Home/away	Venue	Attendance	Ladder
1	Thursday 19 March, 7:25pm	16.9 (105)	Carlton	12.9 (81)	Won by 24 points	Home	MCG	0	6th
2	Thursday 11 June, 7:40pm	5.6 (36)	Collingwood	5.6 (36)	Draw	Away	MCG	0	5th
3	Thursday 18 June, 7:40pm	5.9 (39)	Hawthorn	11.5 (71)	Lost by 32 points	Home	MCG	0	9th
4	Saturday 27 June, 4:35pm	10.7 (67)	St Kilda	15.3 (93)	Lost by 26 points	Away	Marvel Stadium	0	14th
5	Sunday 5 July, 3:35pm	12.7 (79)	Melbourne	8.4 (52)	Won by 27 points	Home	MCG	0	11th
6	Sunday 12 July, 3:35pm	4.10 (34)	Sydney	3.8 (26)	Won by 8 points	Home/Neutral	The Gabba	3,606	6th
7	Saturday 18 July, 7:40pm	11.11 (77)	North Melbourne	2.11 (23)	Won by 54 points	Home/Neutral	Metricon Stadium	4,337	4th
8	Friday 24 July, 7:50pm	6.14 (50)	Greater Western Sydney	9.8 (62)	Lost by 12 points	Away	GIANTS Stadium	5,500	9th
9	Wednesday 29 July, 7:10pm	13.12 (90)	Western Bulldogs	7.7 (49)	Won by 41 points	Away/Neutral	Metricon Stadium	2,824	5th
10	Tuesday 4 August, 7:10pm	12.10 (82)	Brisbane Lions	4.17 (41)	Won by 41 points	Home/Neutral	Metricon Stadium	5,651	4th
11	Saturday 8 August, 4:35pm	11.6 (72)	Port Adelaide	13.15 (93)	Lost by 21 points	Away	Adelaide Oval	10,256	6th
12	Monday 17 August, 7:10pm	8.5 (53)	Gold Coast	4.8 (32)	Won by 21 points	Home/Neutral	The Gabba	4,062	6th
13	Saturday 22 August, 7:40pm	10.13 (73)	Essendon	10.1 (61)	Won by 12 points	Away/Neutral	TIO Stadium	5,401	5th
14	Thursday 27 August, 7:10pm	14.4 (88)	West Coast	9.7 (61)	Won by 27 points	Home/Neutral	Metricon Stadium	3,628	4th
15	Wednesday 2 September, 7:10pm	8.8 (56)	Fremantle	4.5 (29)	Won by 27 points	Home/Neutral	Metricon Stadium	1,818	3rd
16	BYE								4th
17	Friday 11 September, 7:50pm	7.15 (57)	Geelong	4.7 (31)	Won by 26 points	Away/Neutral	Metricon Stadium	7,061	3rd
18	Saturday 19 September, 5:10pm	12.5 (77)	Adelaide	4.9 (33)	Won by 44 points	Away	Adelaide Oval	17,710	3rd

==== Finals ====
Match	Date	Score	Opponent	Opponent's Score	Result	Home/Away	Venue	Attendance
Qualifying final	Friday 2 October, 7:50pm	8.6 (54)	Brisbane Lions	10.9 (69)	Lost by 15 points	Away	The Gabba	22,104
Semi-final	Friday 9 October, 6:50pm	12.8 (80)	St Kilda	6.13 (49)	Won by 31 points	Home/Neutral	Metricon Stadium	13,778
Preliminary final	Friday 16 October, 7:20pm	6.10 (46)	Port Adelaide	6.4 (40)	Won by 6 points	Away	Adelaide Oval	24,292
Grand Final	Saturday 24 October, 6:30pm	12.9 (81)	Geelong	7.8 (50)	Won by 31 points	Home/Neutral	The Gabba	29,707

=== Ladder ===
Pos	Team	Pld	W	L	D	PF	PA	PP	Pts	Qualification
1	Port Adelaide	17	14	3	0	1185	869	136.4	56	Finals series
2	Brisbane Lions	17	14	3	0	1184	948	124.9	56	Finals series
3	Richmond (P)	17	12	4	1	1135	874	129.9	50	Finals series
4	Geelong	17	12	5	0	1233	901	136.8	48	Finals series
5	West Coast	17	12	5	0	1095	936	117.0	48	Finals series
6	St Kilda	17	10	7	0	1159	997	116.2	40	Finals series
7	Western Bulldogs	17	10	7	0	1103	1034	106.7	40	Finals series
8	Collingwood	17	9	7	1	965	881	109.5	38	Finals series
9	Melbourne	17	9	8	0	1063	986	107.8	36	
10	Greater Western Sydney	17	8	9	0	1007	1053	95.6	32	
11	Carlton	17	7	10	0	1017	1078	94.3	28	
12	Fremantle	17	7	10	0	866	924	93.7	28	
13	Essendon	17	6	10	1	938	1185	79.2	26	
14	Gold Coast	17	5	11	1	996	1099	90.6	22	
15	Hawthorn	17	5	12	0	1004	1194	84.1	20	
16	Sydney	17	5	12	0	890	1077	82.6	20	
17	North Melbourne	17	3	14	0	858	1205	71.2	12	
18	Adelaide	17	3	14	0	826	1283	64.4	12	

Updated to match(es) played on 21 September 2020. Source: AFL
Rules for classification: 1) points; 2) percentage; 3) number of points for.
(P) Premiers

=== Awards ===
==== League awards ====
===== All-Australian team =====
	Player	Position	Appearance
Named	Dustin Martin	Forward pocket	4th
Nominated	Dylan Grimes	-	-
Nominated	Nick Vlastuin	-	-

===== Brownlow Medal tally =====
Player	3 vote games	2 vote games	1 vote games	Total votes	Place
Dustin Martin	3	2	2	15	5th
Shai Bolton	3	0	0	9	26th
Kane Lambert	2	0	0	6	43rd
Trent Cotchin	1	1	0	5	55th
Jack Graham	1	0	0	3	86th
Dion Prestia	1	0	0	3	86th
Jayden Short	0	1	1	3	86th
Liam Baker	0	1	1	3	86th
Jack Riewoldt	0	1	0	2	117th
Derek Eggmolesse-Smith	0	1	0	2	117th
Shane Edwards	0	0	1	1	157th
Jake Aarts	0	0	1	1	157th
Bachar Houli	0	0	1	1	157th
Nick Vlastuin	0	0	1	1	157th
Noah Balta	0	0	1	1	157th
Total	11	7	9	56	-

===== 22 Under 22 team =====
	Player	Position	Appearance
Named	Noah Balta	Centre half-back	1st
Named	Liam Baker	Half-back	1st
Nominated	Shai Bolton	–	–

==== Club awards ====
===== Jack Dyer Medal =====
Position	Player	Votes	Medal
1st	Jayden Short	53	Jack Dyer Medal
2nd	Dustin Martin	50	Jack Titus Medal
3rd	Nick Vlastuin	49	Maurie Fleming Medal
4th	Shai Bolton	44	Fred Swift Medal
5th	Kamdyn McIntosh	43	Kevin Bartlett Medal
6th	Liam Baker	42	
7th	Dylan Grimes	41	
8th	Noah Balta	40	
9th	Kane Lambert	39	
10th	Trent Cotchin	37	

===== Michael Roach Medal =====
Position	Player	Goals
1st	Jack Riewoldt	33
2nd	Tom Lynch	32
3rd	Dustin Martin	22
4th	Jason Castagna	17
5th	Shai Bolton	15

== AFL Women's ==
=== List building and recruitment ===
==== Expansion signings ====
Date	Player	Club from	League from	Ref
9 April	Katie Brennan	Western Bulldogs	AFL Women's	
12 April	Maddy Brancatisano	Melbourne	AFL Women's	
12 April	Phoebe Monahan	Greater Western Sydney	AFL Women's	
12 April	Iilish Ross	Collingwood	AFL Women's	
15 April	Christina Bernardi	Greater Western Sydney	AFL Women's	

==== Trades ====
Date	Gained	Lost	Trade partner	Ref
16 April	Sabrina Frederick	Pick 12	Brisbane	
24 April	Monique Conti	Pick 1	Western Bulldogs	

==== Academy/VFLW pre-list signings ====
Date	Player	Club from	League from	Classification	Ref
30 April	Hannah Burchell	Geelong	AFL Women's	Delisted free agent	
16 May	Courtney Wakefield	Richmond	VFL Women's	Open-age	
21 May	Tayla Stahl	Richmond	VFL Women's	Open-age	
20 June	Alice Edmonds	Richmond	VFL Women's	Open-age	
23 July	Grace Campbell	Richmond	VFL Women's	Open-age	
23 July	Akec Makur Chuot	Richmond	VFL Women's	Open-age	
23 July	Rebecca Miller	Richmond	VFL Women's	Open-age	
23 July	Gabby Seymour	Richmond	VFL Women's	Rookie	
16 August	Kodi Jacques	Richmond	VFL Women's	Open-age	
6 September	Alana Woodward	Richmond	VFL Women's	Open-age	

==== National draft ====
Round	Overall pick	Player	Position	Team from	League from	Ref
1	7	Sophie Molan	Midfielder	GWV Rebels	NAB League	
2	25	Laura McClelland	Defender	Eastern Ranges	NAB League	
2	31	Ella Wood	Midfielder	GWV Rebels	NAB League	
2	40	Sarah Sansonetti	Half-back	Northern Knights	NAB League	
3	43	Holly Whitford	Midfielder	Melbourne University	VFL Women's	
3	55	Nekaela Butler	Small defender	GWV Rebels	NAB League	
4	58	Cleo Saxon-Jones	Ruck / forward	Western Jets	NAB League	
4	71	Laura Bailey	Defender	Richmond	VFL Women's	
5	73	Emma Horne	Midfielder	Richmond	VFL Women's	
5	84	Kate Dempsey	Defender	Richmond	VFL Women's	
6	87	Ciara Fitzgerald	Defender	Northern Knights	NAB League	
6	93	Emily Harley	Forward	Oakleigh Chargers	NAB League	
6	96	Lauren Tesoriero	Midfielder	Richmond	VFL Women's	

=== 2020 squad ===
Richmond Football Club (AFL Women's)
Senior list		Rookie list	Coaching staff
1 Sophie Molan; 2 Phoebe Monahan; 3 Katie Brennan; 4 Monique Conti; 5 Maddy Brancatisano; 6 Christina Bernardi; 7 Lauren Tesoriero; 8 Courtney Wakefield; 9 Hannah Burchell; 10 Kodi Jacques; 11 Alice Edmonds; 12 Laura Bailey; 13 Alana Woodward; 14 Sabrina Frederick; 15 Rebecca Miller	16 Laura McClelland; 17 Ella Wood; 18 Sarah Sansonetti; 19 Kate Dempsey; 20 Holly Whitford; 21 Iilish Ross; 22 Nekaela Butler; 23 Emma Horne; 24 Tayla Stahl; 25 Cleo Saxon-Jones; 26 Ciara Fitzgerald; 27 Emily Harley; 34 Akec Makur Chuot; 43 Grace Campbell	28 Gabby Seymour	Head coach: Tom Hunter; Assistant coaches: Jacob Thompson (midfield); Jason Armistead (forwards); Sam Shaw (backline); Nathan Chapman (specialist/skills); Liz Quinn (culture and leadership); Legend: (c) Captain(s); (vc) Vice-captain(s)

=== 2020 season ===
==== Home and away season ====
Note: The final two rounds of the season were cancelled to bring forward the finals series in response to the coronavirus pandemic.

Round	Date	Score	Opponent	Opponent's score	Result	Home/away	Venue	Attendance	Conference ladder (of 7)
1	Friday 7 February, 7:45pm	2.2 (14)	Carlton	6.12 (48)	Lost by 34 points	Home	Ikon Park	15,337	7th
2	Saturday 15 February, 4:10pm	2.10 (22)	Gold Coast	5.3 (33)	Lost by 11 points	Away	Metricon Stadium	7,071	7th
3	Sunday 23 February, 3:10pm	2.8 (20)	North Melbourne	12.4 (76)	Lost by 56 points	Home	Ikon Park	3,697	7th
4	Saturday 29 February, 3:10pm	7.3 (45)	Geelong	10.7 (67)	Lost by 22 points	Home	Queen Elizabeth Oval	4,906	7th
5	Saturday 7 March 5:10pm	1.5 (11)	Greater Western Sydney	7.14 (56)	Lost by 45 points	Away	Robertson Oval	3,377	7th
6	Saturday 14 March, 5:10pm	0.3 (3)	St Kilda	6.6 (42)	Lost by 39 points	Away	RSEA Park	0	7th
7	Friday 20 March, 5:45pm		Brisbane		DNP	Home	Ikon Park		
8	Sunday 29 March, 1:10pm		Adelaide		DNP	Away	Unley Oval		

=== Awards ===
==== League awards ====
===== All-Australian team =====
	Player	Position	Appearance
Nominated	Monique Conti	-	-

===== 22 Under 22 team =====
	Player	Position	Appearance
Named	Monique Conti	Wing	1st

==== Club awards ====
===== Best and Fairest award =====
Position	Player	Votes
1st	Monique Conti	25
2nd	Phoebe Monahan	22
3rd	Gabby Seymour	18
4th	Christina Bernardi	16
4th	Grace Campbell	16
4th	Kodi Jacques	16
7th	Sabrina Frederick	15
7th	Sophie Molan	15
7th	Sarah Sansonetti	15
10th	Alice Edmonds	14

===== Leading goalkicker award =====
Position	Player	Goals
1st	Courtney Wakefield	4
2nd	Christina Bernardi	3
2nd	Sabrina Frederick	3
4th	Katie Brennan	1
4th	Kodi Jacques	1
4th	Laura McClelland	1
4th	Tayla Stahl	1

== VFL/VFLW seasons (cancelled) ==
Richmond had been expected to field a reserves men's team in the Victorian Football League for a seventh consecutive season, defending their 2019 premiership. In March, the AFL issued a direction to all 18 clubs mandating that no AFL-listed player at a club could participate in a second-tier state league amidst the COVID-19 pandemic and in July, the season was formally cancelled for all participant clubs. Likewise, the club did not field a team in the VFL Women's competition as that season was also cancelled.
