= Laura Bailey (disambiguation) =

Laura Bailey (born 28 May 1981) is an American voice actress.

Laura Bailey may also refer to:

- Laura Bailey (model) (born 1972), English model and photographer
- Laura Bailey (footballer) (born 1992), retired Australian rules footballer

== See also ==
- Laura Bayley (1862–1938), British actress and filmmaker
