= Luka Lesosky-Hay =

Australian rules footballer

Personal information
- Born: 1 July 2001 (age 25)
- Original team: Geelong Falcons (NAB League Girls)
- Draft: No. 53, 2019 national draft
- Debut: Round 1, 2021, Richmond vs. Brisbane, at Punt Road Oval
- Height: 164 cm (5 ft 5 in)
- Position: Inside midfielder

Playing career^{1}
Years	Club	Games (Goals)
2021	Richmond	1 (0)
- ^{1} Playing statistics correct to the end of the 2021 season.

Luka Lesosky-Hay (born 1 July 2001) is an Australian rules footballer who played for the Richmond Football Club in the AFL Women's (AFLW). After a junior career with the Geelong Falcons in the NAB League Girls competition, Lesosky-Hay was overlooked at the 2019 draft. She was later selected to join Richmond as a train-on injury replacement player during the 2020 AFL Women's season but did not earn a league debut that season. Later that year, Lesosky-Hay was drafted by Richmond with their third selection and fifty-third overall in the 2020 AFL Women's draft. She made her debut against Brisbane at Punt Road Oval in the opening round of the 2021 season. She was delisted by Richmond in April 2021. Luka Lesosky-Hay is now pursuing a career as an artist.

== Statistics ==
Statistics are correct to the end of the 2020 season.

Legend
G	Goals	K	Kicks	D	Disposals	T	Tackles
B	Behinds	H	Handballs	M	Marks

Season	Team	No.	Games	Totals							Averages (per game)						
Season	Team	No.	Games	G	B	K	H	D	M	T	G	B	K	H	D	M	T
2020	Richmond	26	1	0	0	1	2	3	1	0	0.0	0.0	1.0	2.0	3.0	1.0	0.0
Career			1	0	0	1	2	3	1	0	0.0	0.0	1.0	2.0	3.0	1.0	0.0
