= Jayden Short =

Australian rules footballer (born 1996)

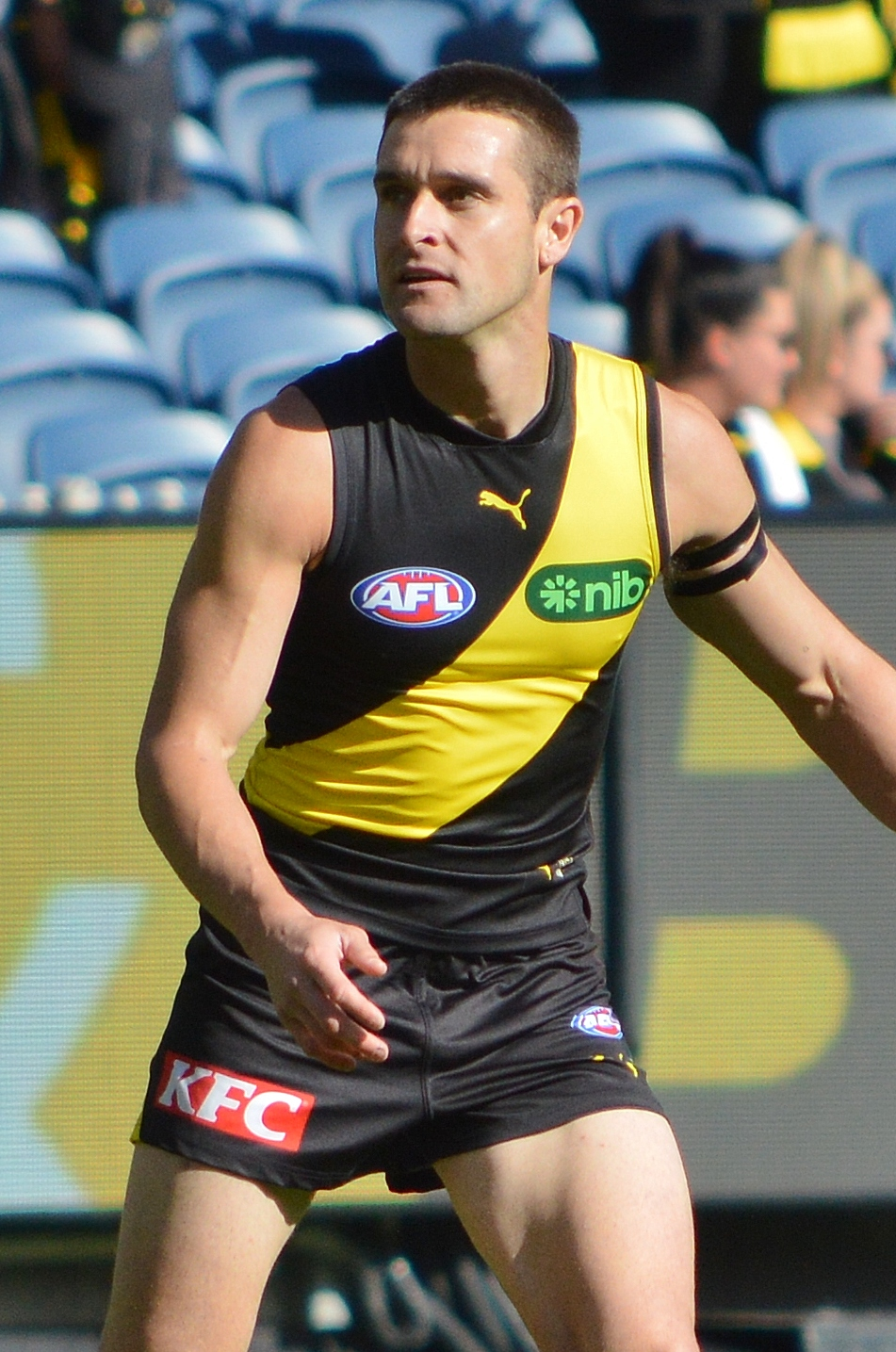
- Short playing for Richmond in April 2025

Personal information
- Born: 24 January 1996 (age 30)
- Original team: Northern Knights (TAC Cup) Mill Park Football Club
- Draft: No. 11, 2015 rookie draft: Richmond
- Debut: Round 2, 2016, Richmond vs. Collingwood, at MCG
- Height: 178 cm (5 ft 10 in)
- Weight: 76 kg (168 lb)
- Position: Defender / midfielder

Club information
- Current club: Richmond
- Number: 15

Playing career^{1}
Years	Club	Games (Goals)
2015–	Richmond	211 (41)
- ^{1} Playing statistics correct to the end of 2026.

Career highlights
- 2× AFL premiership player: 2019, 2020; Jack Dyer Medal: 2020; 22under22 team: 2018

Jayden Short (born 24 January 1996) is an Australian rules footballer currently playing for the Richmond Football Club in the Australian Football League (AFL). He was a premiership player with Richmond in 2019 and 2020, and in 2020 won the club's best and fairest award, the Jack Dyer Medal. He is best known for his efficient, penetrating kicks off half back and his excellent work rates.

== Early life and junior football ==
Short spent his formative years in Mill Park, a suburb 19 kilometres north-east of Melbourne. He played representative junior football with the Northern Knights in the TAC Cup in 2013 while completing his last year of high school at St Monica's College. Short returned to the Knights in 2014, playing while also working as a carpenter. He missed the first two months of that season due to jaw injury sustained in a night club fight but completed 2014 having played 13 matches, kicking 12 goals and holding averages of 22 disposals and four tackles per game. He was named among his club's best players in eight of his 13 matches. Short was ranked the best kick in the TAC Cup that year, recording an efficiency of 73.7 per cent by foot across his matches in 2014.

He supported the Carlton Football Club growing up and idolised Anthony Koutoufides.

Prior to the AFL draft, Short was interviewed in his home by Richmond, Collingwood and Hawthorn.

== AFL career ==
=== 2015 season ===
After being passed over by all 18 clubs in the national draft, Short was drafted by Richmond with the 11th overall selection in the 2015 rookie draft.

Short played his first match for Richmond in the 2015 pre-season competition, kicking one goal in a forward line role during a loss to the Western Bulldogs at the Whitten Oval. He went unselected for an AFL debut when the season began, and instead played reserves-grade matches with the club's Victorian Football League side. Short played primarily as a forward and occasionally as a stoppage-attending half-forward during this time, regularly kicking goals and receiving the coaches' public praise for his efforts with ball in hand, but copping criticism for his defensive efforts and subpar application of forward-half pressure. He produced a standout three-goal performance in late June, before suffering a season-ending ankle injury in a match against the Northern Bullants the following week. He had failed to make an AFL debut that year, but had played 10 VFL matches with averages of 13 disposals per game.

=== 2016 season ===
In March 2016 Short was upgraded to Richmond's senior list, replacing the injured Reece Conca. He made his debut in round 2 of that season and kicked a goal with his first kick in league football. Short finished the game with an equal team-high three goals. In that match he also suffered a minor shoulder injury, but opted not to treat it with reparative surgery. He followed the match up with a poor performance the following week and was subsequently dropped to the club's reserves side. When he returned to the senior side in round 7 he played significant game-time as a small defender, having been trialed in the role in VFL matches the previous month. He remained in the side for three weeks before being dropped for matches in round 10 and 11. He did not miss another match after returning to play the Gold Coast in round 12. He finished his debut season having played 16 matches, playing predominantly in the backline and becoming a key kick-out taker for the side. At season's end he was upgraded to the Richmond's senior playing list and switched guernsey numbers from 45 to 15.

=== 2017 season ===
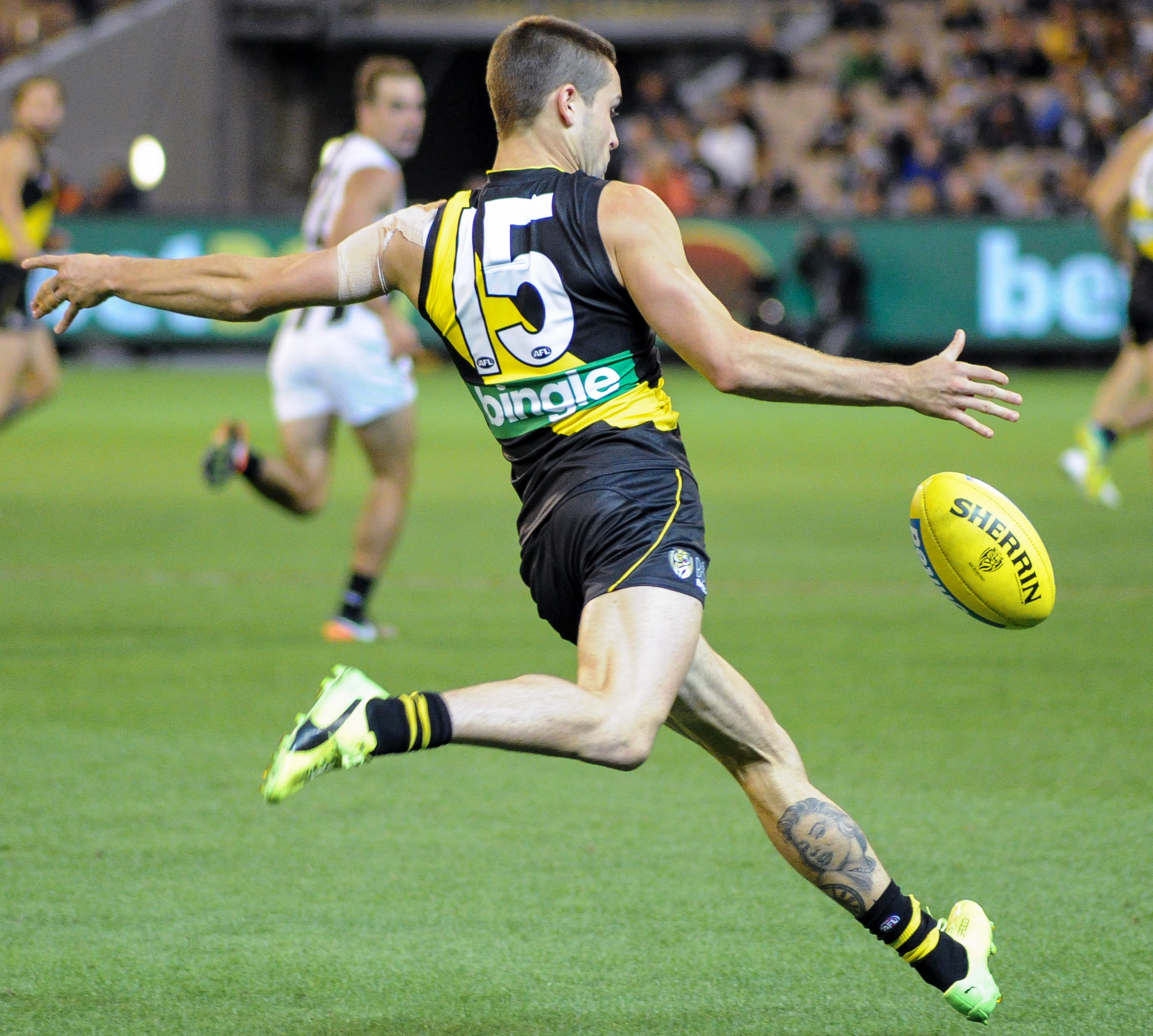
Short kicks during play in round 2 of the 2017 season

Short's first senior match in 2017 came in Richmond's round 2 victory against Collingwood. He recorded a game-high 634 metres gained in that match. He remained in the senior side through round 7, where he became the subject of media attention after he was ruled to have deliberately rushed the ball out of bounds late in the final minutes of Richmond's five-point loss to the Western Bulldogs. Short found himself in a similar situation in round 10 when he was ruled to have deliberately rushed a behind while being chased to the goal line by Essendon's Josh Green. It was a decision that sparked media discussion over a possible future change to the rules. After all teams had completed their bye in round 13, Short ranked third in the AFL for metres gained per disposal (25.3). By round 15 he was averaging 276 metres gained per match. Over the next three weeks he became the club's prime rebounding defender as a result of a four week suspension being served by teammate Bachar Houli. Round 18 saw Short significantly underperform, recording no rebound 50s and less than 10 total disposals for the first time that year. He was dropped the following week and did not return to senior football in 2017. Short's year did not end there however, as he joined Richmond's reserves side in their VFL finals run. This period included playing in three winning finals and in the club's losing grand final against Port Melbourne. The following week he was named as an emergency, but did not play, in Richmond's AFL Grand Final team. Short finished the season having played 16 matches at AFL level.

=== 2018 season ===
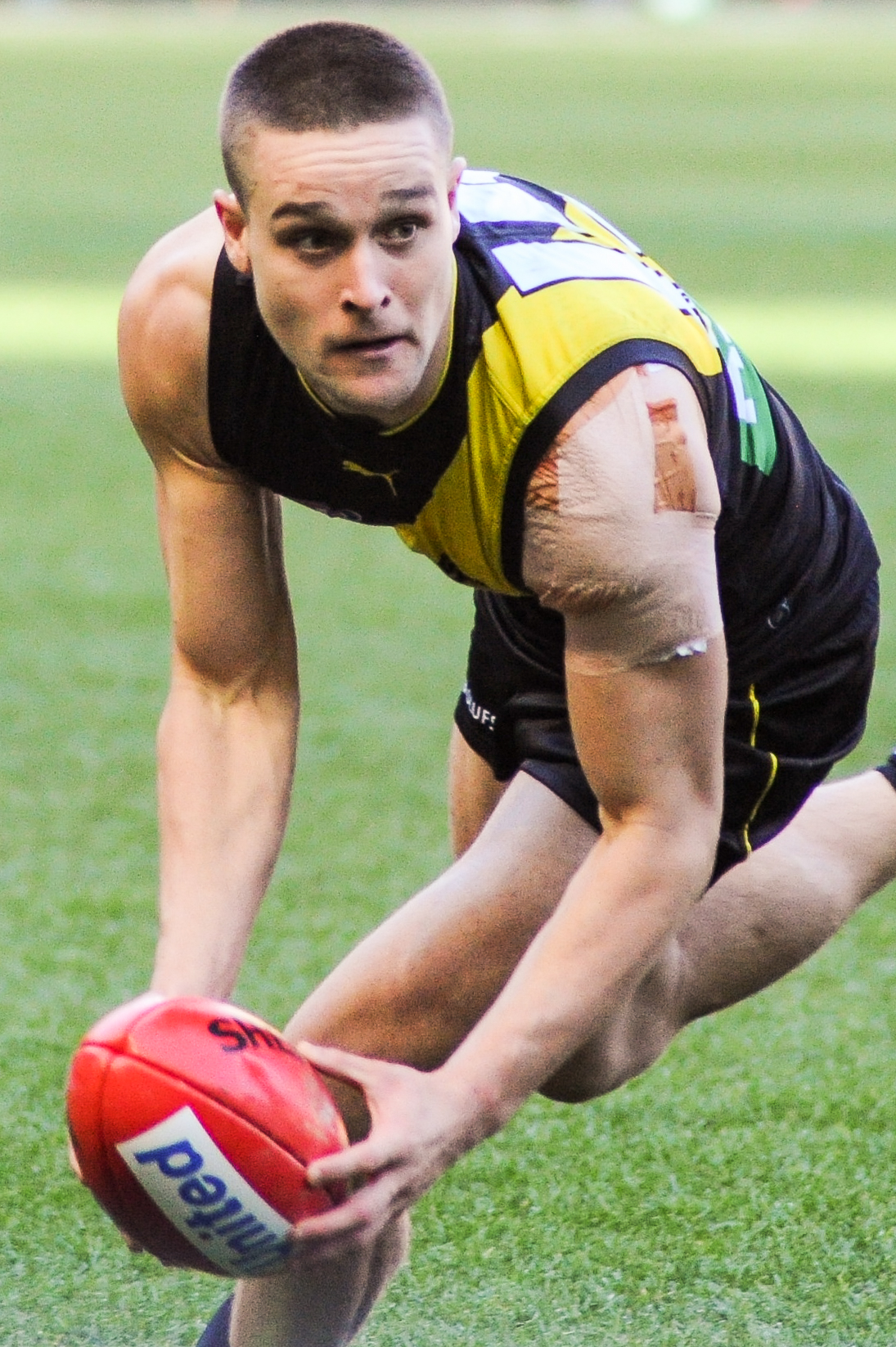
Short in June 2017

In the 2017/18 off-season, Short underwent shoulder surgery to repair the troublesome joint that had sustained minor injury in his first AFL match two years earlier. His experience during the procedure and in the early stages of recovery was recorded and later revealed in a documentary short film commissioned by the AFL Players Association entitled The Surgery. Though he would return to conditioning work within a month, the recovery process kept him from participating in contact drills into the start of the 2018 calendar year. Short spent that off-season training with the midfield group, with an eye to playing a dual role of half-back and wing in the coming season. Short returned to full fitness in time to play for Richmond's side at the Sydney AFLX tournament in February, before playing in each of the club's two pre-season matches. In round 1 he re-joined the club's best-22 after premiership defenders Bachar Houli and Nathan Broad missed due to injury and suspension respectively. Short impressed, holding a spot in the side even after Houli and Broad's return to availability. In round 6 he received a vote in the AFL Coaches Association Player of the Year award after recording 20 disposals, eight intercepts and a game-high eight rebound-50s. To that point he ranked second at the club and 30th in the league for kicking efficiency (75.3 per cent) He also placed second at Richmond and behind only Dustin Martin for total metres gained in the first six matches of the year. Short was among Richmond's best in round 9's loss to West Coast, recording 14 disposals, 481 metres gained and adding two goals. Two weeks later he would post a then-career-high 28 disposals in the Dreamtime at the 'G match against Essendon. After that match coach Damien Hardwick flagged Short as "one of the most improved players in the competition" for his jump that season. He backed up that performance the following week with a game-high 10 rebound-50s, a team-high 652 metres gained and two AFL Coaches Association Player of the Year votes, the only Richmond player to record votes in that loss to Port Adelaide. After 13 rounds of the season Short ranked third in the league for total metres gained and ninth for rebound 50s. He was at that point labelled by AFL Media as Richmond's most improved player, with the media organisation also predicting he would be running fifth in the club's best and fairest count at that stage of the season. Another pivotal performance came immediately following the bye, with Short kicking two goals and recording a game-high 722 metres gained in the club's round 15 win over Sydney. Following that match he was ranked second in the league for metres gained. He added another four goals in the following four matches, including a two goal performance that saw him named among Richmond's best in his 50th career match, a round 19 win over Collingwood. By the end of that round Short had taken the number one rank in the league for metres gained, averaging 526 per match. He remained in form at AFL level through the end of the regular season and into the club's home qualifying final against Hawthorn, where he recorded 21 disposals. Short contributed a further 18 disposals in what was a disappointing end to the year in a shock preliminary final knock-out loss to Collingwood. At season's end he was named at half-back in the AFL's 2018 Player Ratings seconds team. Short was also named at half-back in the AFL Players Association's 22 under 22 team and placed ninth in the Richmond best and fairest count. He finished the year having ranked first in the league for metres gained and 10th for rebound 50s. Short's performances in 2018 led him to be labelled by numerous media outlets as one of the most improved players in the league that year, including AFL.com.au who named him second by that measure and labelled him an unlucky omission from that year's All-Australian squad.

=== 2019 season ===
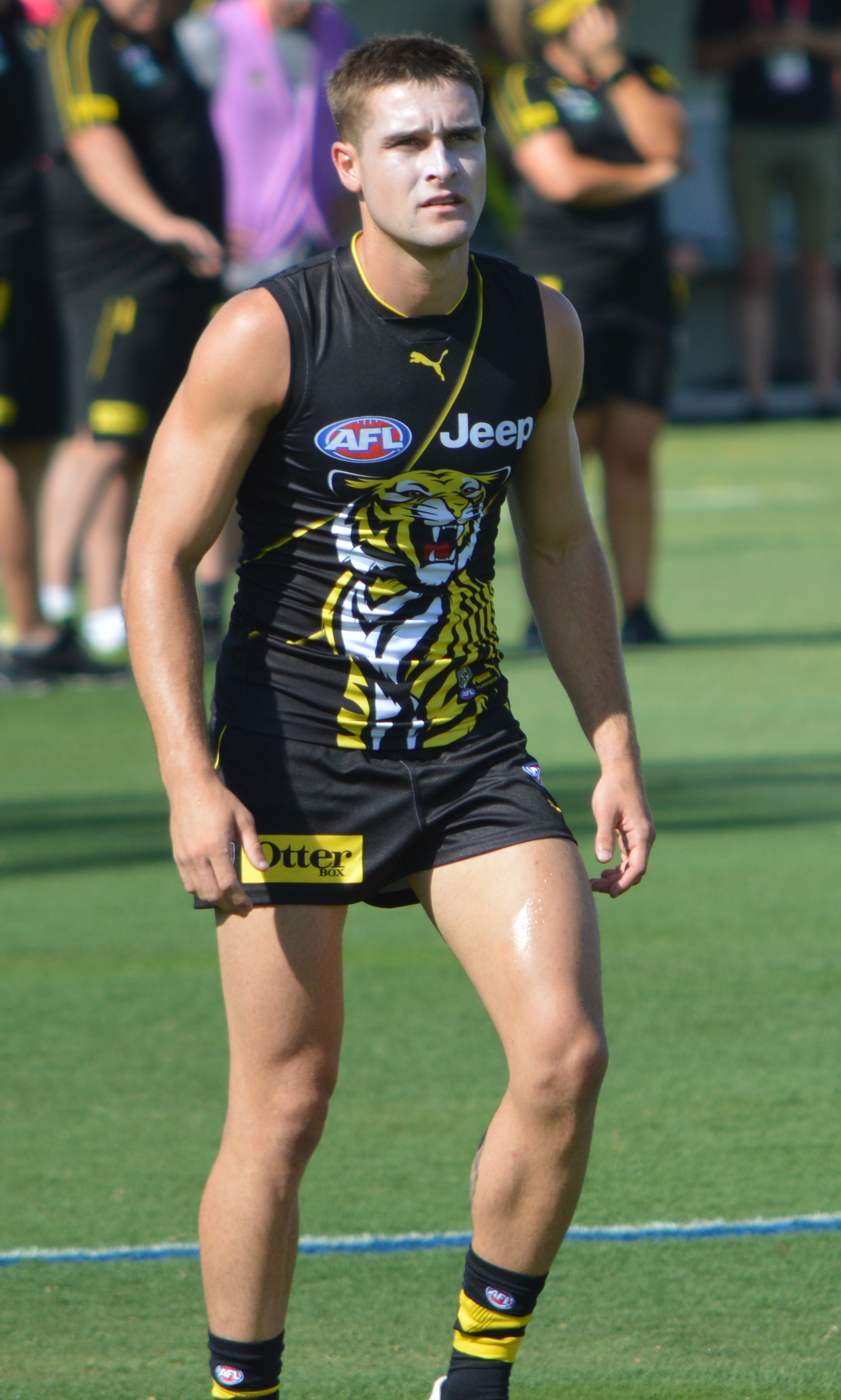
Short with Richmond during a pre-season match in March 2019

Ahead of the 2019 season, Short was named by Fox Footy as the Richmond player most likely to make a significant rise in output that year. He started the 2019 campaign with appearances in each of the club's two pre-season matches before recording 20 disposals in round 1's season-opening match against Carlton. Short kicked two goals and was among Richmond's best players in round 2, but the following week suffered a dislocated right elbow in the first quarter of a loss to Greater Western Sydney. Initial estimations from the club said Short would miss at least eight weeks of football as he recovered from the injury. By mid-May that schedule had been extended, with Short out of his elbow brace and beginning to rehabilitate the elbow with an eye to a return post-bye. He resumed running in mid June, on track for that revised return target. After completing contact training drills and match practice during the bye, Short earned a selection re-call for round 15's match against St Kilda. He recorded 22 disposals, 706 metres gained and a game-high six rebound 50s in the 33-point victory. He continued to build form over the next month before setting a season-best with 26 disposals in a round 19 win over Collingwood. Short remained with the senior side through the final four matches of the season and kicked a goal in round 22's win over West Coast, his first goal since his return from injury mid-season. Following nine consecutive wins since Short's return, Richmond won its qualifying final against the Brisbane Lions at The Gabba, with Short's 15 disposal contribution labelled "important" by Fox Footy. That earned his side a home preliminary final against Geelong, where Short added a further 13 disposals to help his side through to a grand final match-up against Greater Western Sydney. In the grand final, Short was part of a Richmond defence that kept the Giants to 25 points, their lowest score in the club's eight year history and the lowest score by any team in a VFL/AFL grand final since 1960. He recorded 19 disposals and seven marks in what was described by AFL Media as a "polished" performance. Short finished the year having become a premiership player after playing 15 matches in that injury-interrupted season.

=== 2020 season ===
Short received Richmond life membership in 2019/20 offseason for contribution to the club's 2019 premiership win, before resuming his place in the club's best 22 in pre-season matches against Collingwood and Greater Western Sydney in March. He recorded 15 disposals in a round 1 win over Carlton when the season began in late March, but under extraordinary conditions imposed on the league as a result of the rapid progression of the coronavirus pandemic into Australia. In what the league planned would be the first of a reduced 17-round season, the match was played without crowds in attendance due to public health prohibitions on large gatherings and with quarter lengths reduced by one fifth in order to reduce the physical load on players who would be expected to play multiple matches with short breaks in the second half of the year. Just three days later, the AFL Commission suspended the season for an indefinite period after multiple states enforced quarantine conditions on their borders that effectively ruled out the possibility of continuing the season as planned. After an 11-week hiatus, Short contributed 14 disposals in a round 2 draw with Collingwood when the season resumed in early-June. He remained a steady contributor in June, before the club was relocated to the Gold Coast in response to a virus outbreak in Melbourne in early July. Short lifted his output immediately upon that move, earning four coaches association award votes for a performance that included a team-high 26 disposals and team-high 542 metres gained against Sydney in round 6, before adding one more vote in round 7's win over North Melbourne. He was equal-second-best on ground against the Western Bulldogs two weeks later, receiving four votes for another territory game that included 511 metres gained, before rising one week later to be first among all players in the league that year for total metres gained (460.1m). Prior to round 14, Short was named the sixth most improved player in 2020 according to AFL statistics partner Champion Data, and following a further 19 disposals and 489 metres gained in a win over West Coast, he not only held his place as metres gained leader but rose to second for total kicks and fifth for total marks among all players in the league that season. Short received coaches votes in each of the final three matches of the season including as second best on ground in the club's round 18 win over Adelaide, finishing the regular season having recorded 400 or more metres-gained in a league-best 13 matches. He recorded 22 disposals in the club's finals-opening loss to the Brisbane Lions, before adding 17 more in a semi-final win over St Kilda. In the preliminary final, Short contributed seven intercept possession, helping his side to a close win over Port Adelaide and a spot in the grand final. He became a two-time premiership player in that match, contributing eight intercepts and six score involvements to help Richmond to a 31-point grand final win over Geelong. Short placed second behind only Dustin Martin in the Norm Smith Medal votes for best afield, for that performance which also included a personal season-best 25 disposals. He bested Martin in the club's best and fairest count though, securing the Jack Dyer Medal as the club's most outstanding player in 2020 after playing in all 21 possible matches and recording a league-best average of 480 metres gained per match.

=== 2021 Season ===
Jayden Short played 22 senior matches for Richmond in 2021.He totaled 542 disposals for the year, with 411 kicks and 131 handballs recorded in season statistics. He registered 39 rebound‑50s, reflecting his role in moving play out of the defensive half. Short operated as one of Richmond’s primary rebounding half‑backs, charged with intercepting and then turning defence into attack through long kicking and metre‑gaining. Coaches used him to take attacking kick‑outs on occasion, trusting his ball‐use to start transition sequences. Match reports and statistical breakdowns for the season highlighted his metres‑gained output and his status as a structural piece in Richmond’s defensive setup. While not typically a high‑contested‑ball accumulator, his value came from uncontested possessions, long distribution and repeat running that created forward entries for the Tigers. A small number of coach and media reviews that year pointed to occasional lapses in defensive pressure or risky long kicks that resulted in turnovers, issues that were described as situational rather than season‑defining. Overall, 2021 read as a consolidation season in which Short provided consistent selection, strong metres‑gained numbers and dependable transition work for Richmond.

=== 2022 season ===
Jayden Short appeared in 23 senior games for Richmond in 2022. He recorded 559 disposals for the season, with an increase in rebound‑50s and metres gained compared with earlier campaigns. That statistical shift underlined his continued function as a key generator of forward momentum from defence. Richmond’s coaching staff at times trialled Short higher on the ground, giving him stints on the wing or at half‑forward to exploit his delivery and endurance while still relying on his defensive instincts when play turned back the other way. Media and analytics coverage praised his improved decision‑making under pressure in 2022, noting improved kicking efficiency and better choices when converting defence into attack. Critics continued to note occasional defensive lapses in situational reviews, although these were not treated as defining weaknesses for the year. Short’s role in Richmond’s rotations during 2022 was clear: he remained a structural pillar for rebound and transition, regularly relied upon for late‑game kick‑outs and match‑shaping deliveries. The season reaffirmed his standing as one of the club’s top outside rebounding defenders, durable across the year and frequently among the top contributors in team metrics that measure territory and ball movement.

=== 2023 season ===
In 2023 Short played 16 senior matches for Richmond. He kicked 7 goals and finished the year with 356 disposals, figures that reflect a year in which rotations and tactical adjustments reduced his overall counting output. The Tigers used more aggressive rotation patterns that season, and the emergence of other outside running options meant Short was sometimes part of a rotation that split minutes between half‑back and wing. When he was selected, Short continued to provide long kicking and metre‑gaining transition play, producing moments of class that turned defence into attack. Analysts noted that his style, which relies on space creation and outside delivery, is susceptible to reduced counting stats when coaches allocate minutes differently or press more through the inside. There were no reports of major long‑term injuries for Short in 2023, and the season served as a reminder that selection patterns and role variations can materially affect the raw numbers of players whose strength is metres gained rather than contested ball. Overall, 2023 was quieter on paper but still displayed Short’s technical strengths: effective rebound craft, reliable long kicking and experience operating within a shifting Richmond rotation.

=== 2024 season ===
Jayden Short returned to heavy availability in 2024 and played 22 senior matches. He compiled approximately 482 disposals for the campaign and again ranked highly for kicks and territory creation within the Richmond squad. The coaching staff rotated him between a pure half‑back role and periodic wing time to exploit his endurance and penetrating long kicks. Season reviews and club summaries highlighted improved composure on long kicks and fewer risky turnovers from the back half, with more of his long passes resulting in inside‑50s for the Tigers. Critics continued to call for sharper one‑on‑one defensive pressure in isolated instances, but the overall narrative for 2024 was of a reliable, high‑workload half‑back who stabilised Richmond’s defensive structure. In short, 2024 represented a return to consistent selection and influence for Short, with his kick volume and metres‑gained output reasserting themselves across the season.

=== 2025 season ===
Jayden Short’s 2025 campaign was interrupted by managed availability and short‑term soft‑tissue issues, and he finished the year with 15 senior appearances. Season statistics list him with approximately 318 disposals for 2025, a reduced total compared with his heavier‑output years. Richmond’s official injury reporting during the year recorded a small soleus strain in his calf and listed players with short‑term calf management. Media coverage of the club’s injury situation also flagged Short among players expected to return from calf and hamstring niggles as reinforcements in the latter part of the season. When fit, Short continued to provide long‑range kicking and structured rebound contributions that coaches trusted for set plays out of the backline. The season was therefore nuanced: he retained the technical and tactical strengths that had made him important to Richmond previously, but interruptions to availability and managed minutes reduced his counting output. Club and media coverage indicated that regaining uninterrupted fitness and consistent minutes would be the clearest route for Short to return to the higher output levels of earlier seasons.

== Player profile ==
Short plays as a rebounding half-back, utilising exceptional long kicking skills on either foot to set up offensive chains of possession. He previously played as a small forward in his very early AFL matches.

Following a best and fairest winning year, Short was named the ninth best defender and 28th best player overall in the Herald Sun's list of the best players from the 2020 season.

== Statistics ==
Updated to the end of round 22, 2026.

Legend
G	Goals	K	Kicks	D	Disposals	T	Tackles
B	Behinds	H	Handballs	M	Marks
#	Played in that season's premiership team	†	Led the league for the season

Season	Team	No.	Games	Totals							Averages (per game)							Votes
Season	Team	No.	Games	G	B	K	H	D	M	T	G	B	K	H	D	M	T	Votes
2015		45	0	—	—	—	—	—	—	—	—	—	—	—	—	—	—	0
2016	Richmond	45	16	6	3	189	49	238	54	30	0.4	0.2	11.8	3.1	14.9	3.4	1.9	0
2017	Richmond	15	16	2	1	190	46	236	61	21	0.1	0.1	11.9	2.9	14.8	3.8	1.3	0
2018	Richmond	15	24	9	8	360	120	480	102	39	0.4	0.3	15.0	5.0	20.0	4.3	1.6	1
2019^{#}	Richmond	15	15	3	1	197	68	265	66	26	0.2	0.1	13.1	4.5	17.7	4.4	1.7	0
2020^{#}	Richmond	15	21	0	4	297^{†}	103	400	113	28	0.0	0.2	14.1	4.9	19.0	5.4	1.3	3
2021	Richmond	15	22	1	2	411	131	542	134	39	0.0	0.1	18.7	6.0	24.6	6.1	1.8	0
2022	Richmond	15	23	6	4	444^{†}	115	559	127	67	0.3	0.2	19.3	5.0	24.3	5.5	2.9	6
2023	Richmond	15	16	7	4	279	77	356	100	40	0.4	0.3	17.4	4.8	22.3	6.3	2.5	0
2024	Richmond	15	22	1	4	384	98	482	110	25	0.0	0.2	17.5	4.5	21.9	5.0	1.1	1
2025	Richmond	15	15	3	0	252	66	318	105	24	0.2	0.0	16.8	4.4	21.2	7.0	1.6	0
2026	Richmond	15	19	3	4	338	98	436	132	24	0.2	0.2	17.8	5.2	22.9	6.9	1.3	0
Career			209	41	35	3341	971	4312	1104	363	0.2	0.2	16.0	4.6	20.6	5.3	1.7	11

== Honours and achievements ==
Team

- AFL Premiership (Richmond): 2019, 2020
- McClelland Trophy (Richmond): 2018

Individual

- Jack Dyer Medal RFC B&F: 2020
- 22under22 team: 2018

== Personal life ==
Outside of football Short studies courses in carpentry, building and construction. He previously worked as a builder's labourer as a seventeen year old while playing for the Northern Knights.
