= Mate Colina =

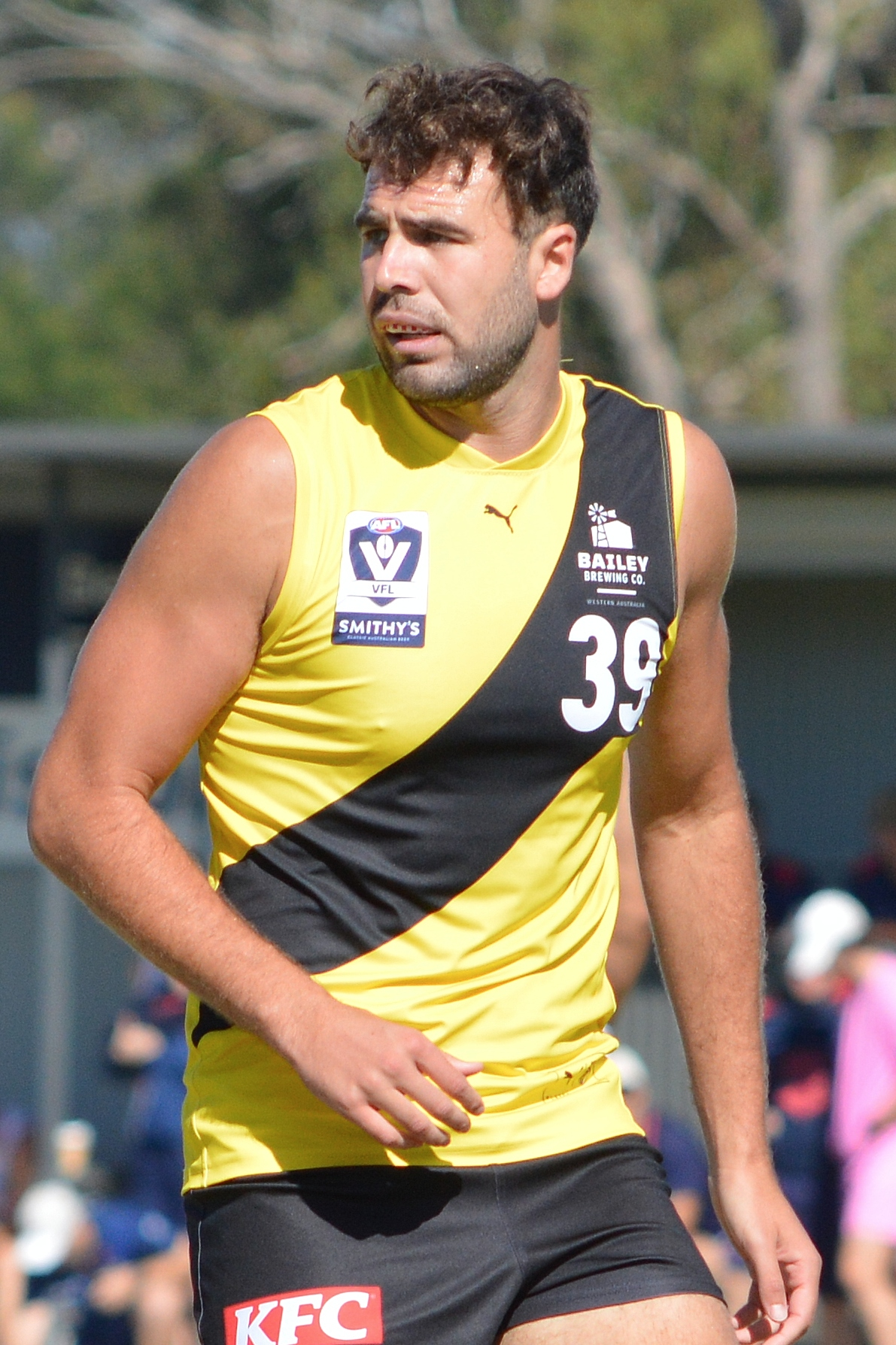
- Colina with Richmond's VFL team in March 2025

Personal information
- Born: 20 May 1999 (age 27); Melbourne, Australia
- Height: 213 cm (7 ft 0 in)
- Weight: 111 kg (245 lb)
- Position: Ruck

Club information
- Current club: Richmond
- Number: 39

Playing career^{1}
Years	Club	Games (Goals)
2021–2025	Richmond	0 (0)
- ^{1} Playing statistics correct to the end of 2025 season.

Mate Colina (born 20 May 1999) is an Australian professional Australian rules football player who plays for the Richmond Football Club in the Australian Football League (AFL). He previously played college basketball at University of Hawaii.

Colina is 213 cm tall, the tallest player ever to be on an AFL list. He was signed at the end of 2020, but remained in Hawaii to finish his degree. He first played for Richmond's team in the Victorian Football League in 2022, but injuries restricted him from any games in 2023 and 2024. He was delisted at the end of the 2024 season, but was redrafted and returned to the VFL side in 2025.

== Personal life ==
He is the cousin of Richmond defender Noah Balta.
