= Nekaela Butler =

Australian rules footballer

Personal information
- Born: 4 June 2001 (age 25)
- Original team: GWV Rebels (NAB League Girls)
- Draft: No. 55, 2019 national draft
- Debut: Round 6, 2020, Richmond vs. St Kilda, at RSEA Park
- Height: 161 cm (5 ft 3 in)
- Position: Defender

Playing career^{1}
Years	Club	Games (Goals)
2020	Richmond	1 (0)
- ^{1} Playing statistics correct to the end of the 2020 season.

Nekaela Butler (born 4 June 2001) is an Australian rules footballer who played one match for the Richmond Football Club in the 2020 AFL Women's season (AFLW). Butler was drafted by Richmond with the club's sixth selection and the 55th pick overall in the 2019 AFL Women's draft and made her debut in the final round of the 2020 season, a loss to St Kilda at RSEA Park. At the end of the season, Butler was delisted by Richmond. She now plays at Donvale.

== Statistics ==
Statistics are correct to the end of the 2020 season.

Legend
G	Goals	K	Kicks	D	Disposals	T	Tackles
B	Behinds	H	Handballs	M	Marks

Season	Team	No.	Games	Totals							Averages (per game)						
Season	Team	No.	Games	G	B	K	H	D	M	T	G	B	K	H	D	M	T
2020	Richmond	22	1	0	0	2	3	5	1	3	0.0	0.0	2.0	3.0	5.0	1.0	3.0
Career			1	0	0	2	3	5	1	3	0.0	0.0	2.0	3.0	5.0	1.0	3.0
