= Tayla Stahl =

Australian rules footballer

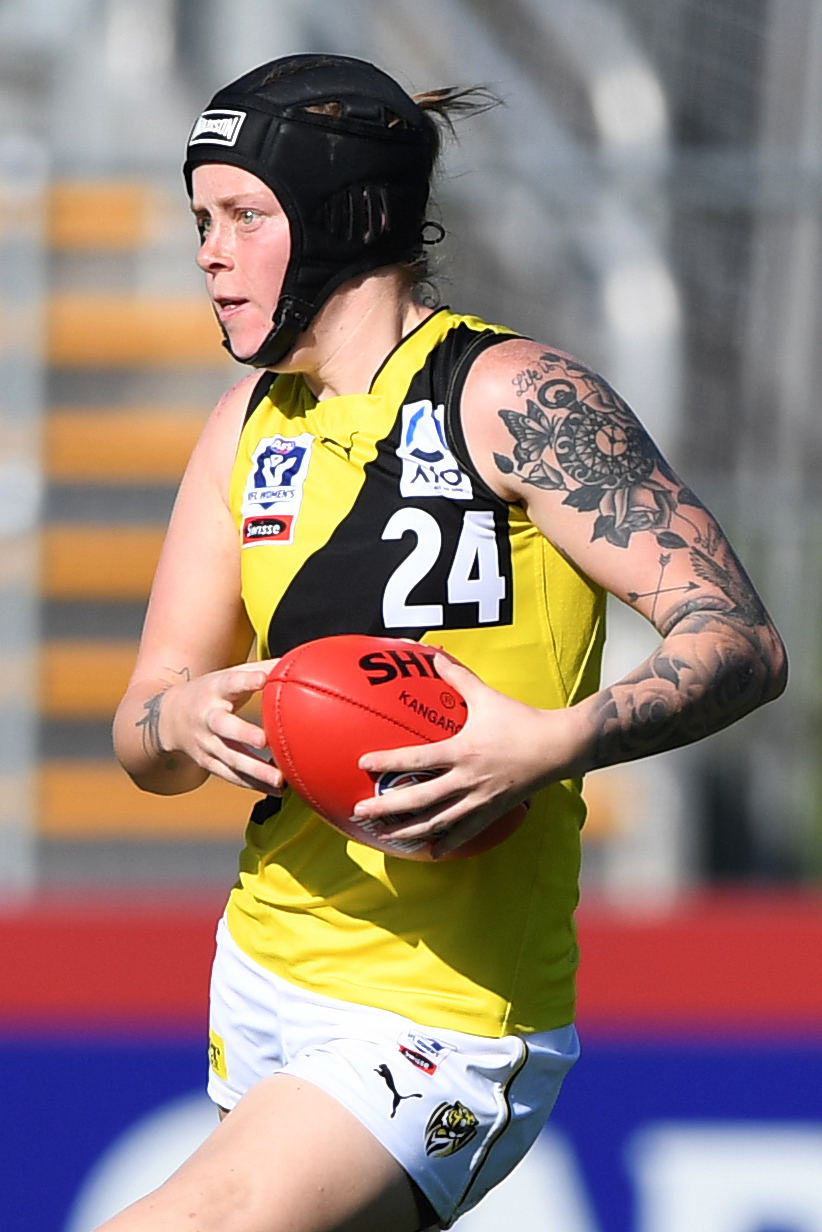
- Stahl playing for Richmond's VFLW team in June 2019

Personal information
- Born: 6 January 1995 (age 31)
- Original team: Richmond (VFLW)
- Debut: Round 1, 2020, Richmond vs. Carlton, at Ikon Park
- Height: 164 cm (5 ft 5 in)
- Position: Forward

Playing career^{1}
Years	Club	Games (Goals)
2020–2022 (S6)	Richmond	21 (13)
- ^{1} Playing statistics correct to the end of 2022 season 6.

Tayla Stahl (born 6 January 1995) is a retired Australian rules footballer who played for the Richmond Football Club in the AFL Women's (AFLW). Prior to signing with Richmond, Stahl was sentenced with a two year suspended sentence for her part in a failed bank robbery. Stahl signed with Richmond during the first period of the 2019 expansion club signing period in May. She made her debut against Carlton at Ikon Park in the opening round of the 2020 season. In June 2022, Stahl retired for health reasons.

== Statistics ==
Legend
G	Goals	K	Kicks	D	Disposals	T	Tackles
B	Behinds	H	Handballs	M	Marks

Season	Team	No.	Games	Totals							Averages (per game)						
Season	Team	No.	Games	G	B	K	H	D	M	T	G	B	K	H	D	M	T
2020	Richmond	24	4	1	1	30	2	32	10	15	0.3	0.3	7.5	0.5	8.0	2.5	3.8
2021	Richmond	24	9	7	2	43	20	63	11	16	0.8	0.2	4.8	2.2	7.0	1.2	1.8
2022 (S6)	Richmond	24	8	5	2	20	13	33	8	12	0.6	0.3	2.5	1.6	4.1	1.0	1.5
Career			21	13	5	93	35	128	29	43	0.6	0.2	4.4	1.7	6.1	1.4	2.0
