= Gabby Seymour =

Australian rules footballer

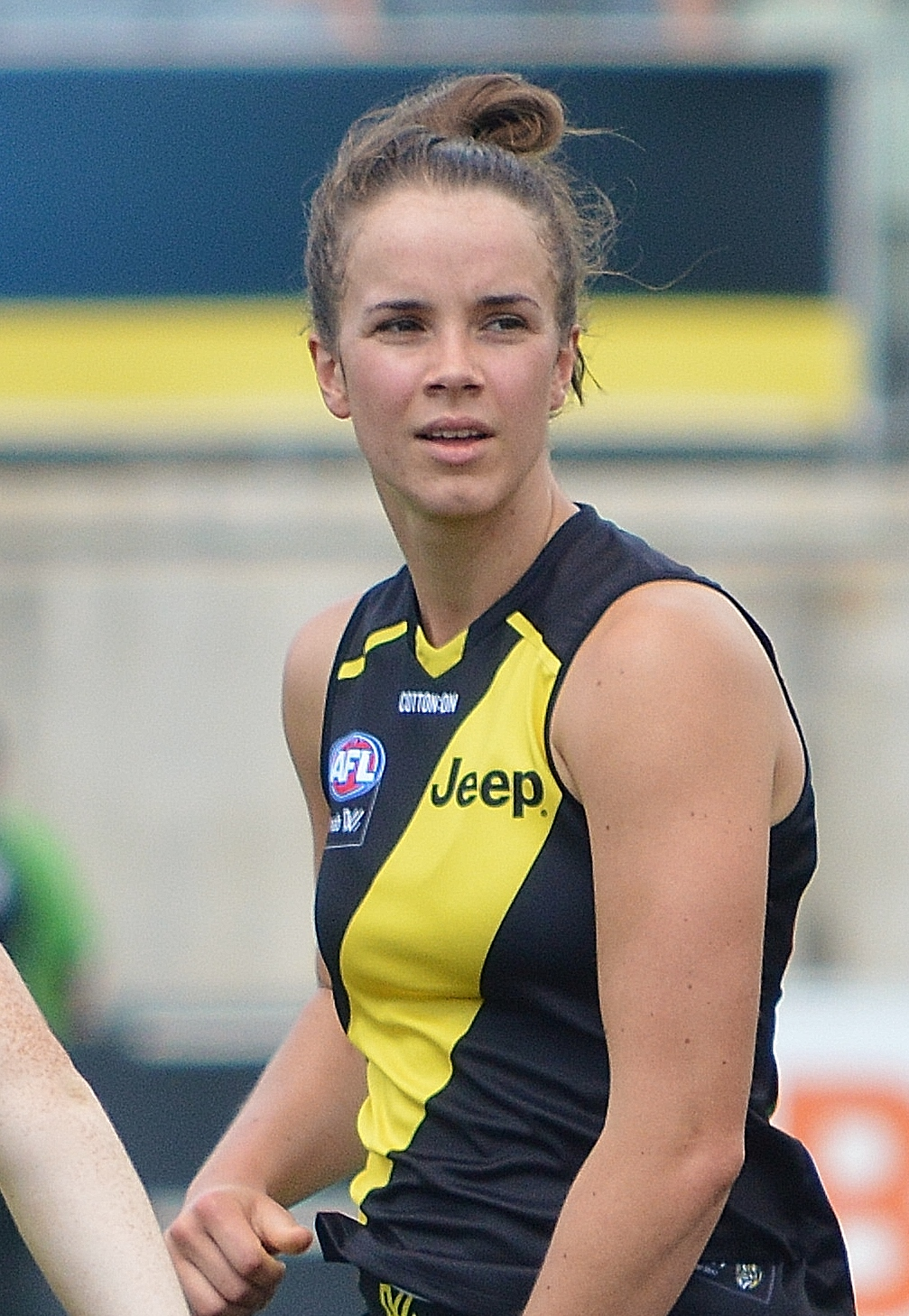
- Seymour with Richmond in February 2020

Personal information
- Full name: Gabrielle Seymour
- Born: 28 October 1996 (age 30)
- Draft: 2019 rookie signing
- Debut: Round 1, 2020, Richmond vs. Carlton, at Ikon Park
- Height: 175 cm (5 ft 9 in)
- Position: Defender / Ruck

Club information
- Current club: Richmond
- Number: 28

Playing career^{1}
Years	Club	Games (Goals)
2020–	Richmond	45 (2)
- ^{1} Playing statistics correct to the end of the 2023 season.

Gabrielle Seymour (born 28 October 1996) is an Australian rules footballer playing for the Richmond Football Club in the AFL Women's (AFLW). Seymour signed with Richmond as a rookie during the 2019 rookie signing period in July. She made her debut against Carlton at Ikon Park in the opening round of the 2020 season.

== Statistics ==
Statistics are correct to the end of the 2020 season.

Legend
G	Goals	K	Kicks	D	Disposals	T	Tackles
B	Behinds	H	Handballs	M	Marks

Season	Team	No.	Games	Totals							Averages (per game)						
Season	Team	No.	Games	G	B	K	H	D	M	T	G	B	K	H	D	M	T
2020	Richmond	28	6	0	0	23	19	42	10	16	0.0	0.0	3.8	3.2	7.0	1.7	2.7
Career			6	0	0	23	19	42	10	16	0.0	0.0	3.8	3.2	7.0	1.7	2.7
