= Ben Miller (footballer) =

Australian rules football player

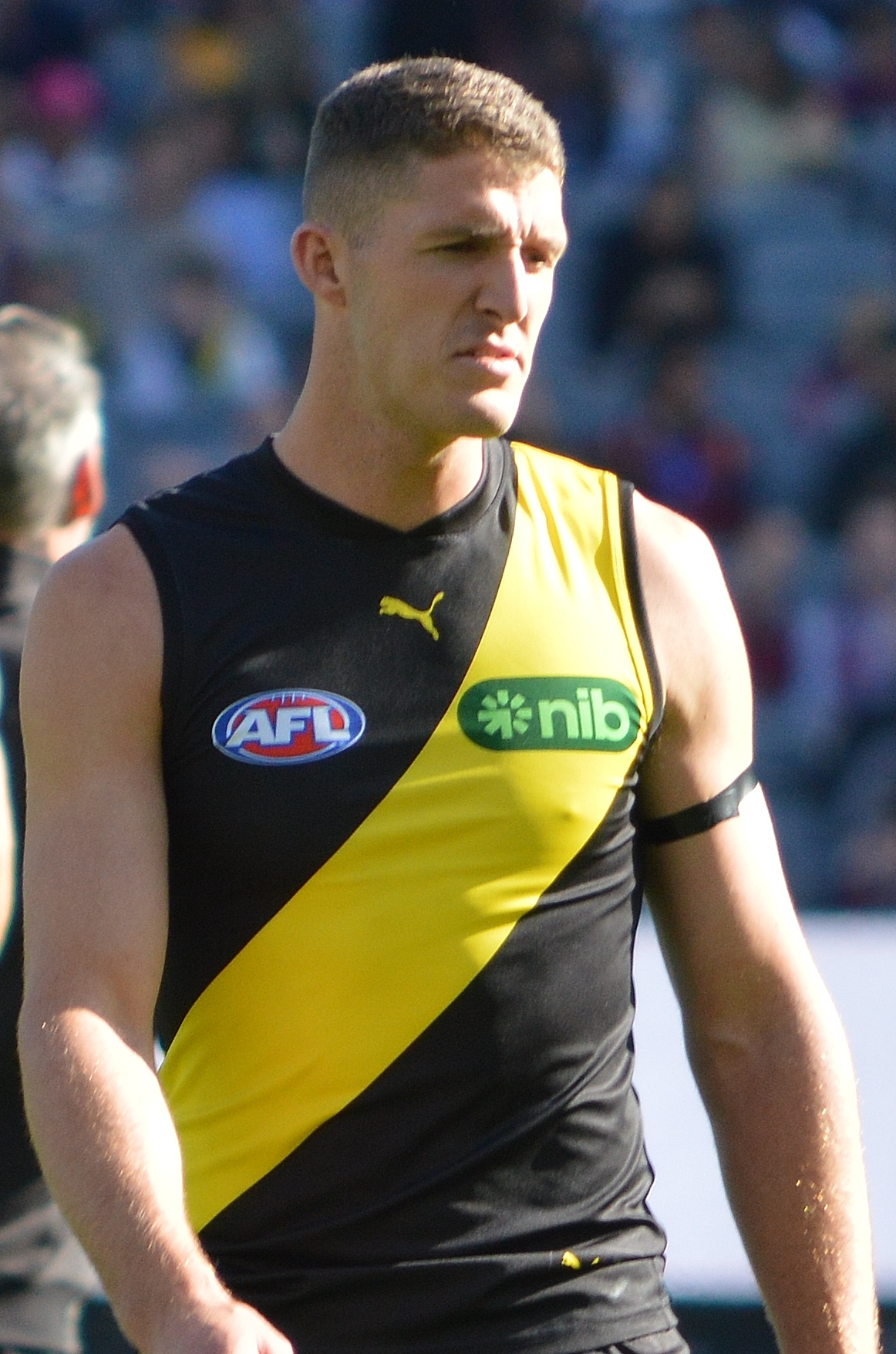
- Miller in April 2025

Personal information
- Nickname: Funky
- Born: 31 August 1999 (age 27)
- Original team: Subiaco (WAFL Colts)
- Draft: No. 63, 2017 AFL national draft
- Debut: Round 23, 2021, Richmond vs. Hawthorn, at MCG
- Height: 198 cm (6 ft 6 in)
- Weight: 96 kg (212 lb)
- Position: Full back

Club information
- Current club: Richmond
- Number: 12

Playing career^{1}
Years	Club	Games (Goals)
2018–	Richmond	90 (9)
- ^{1} Playing statistics correct to the end of 2026.

Career highlights
- VFL: VFL premiership player: 2019

Ben Miller (born 31 August 1999) is a professional Australian rules footballer playing for the Richmond Football Club in the Australian Football League (AFL). He was drafted by Richmond with the 63rd pick in the 2017 AFL national draft and made his debut for the club in round 23 of the 2021 season. In 2019 he was a VFL premiership player while playing reserves grade football for Richmond.

== Early life and junior football ==
Miller grew up in Lamington in Kalgoorlie in regional Western Australia. He represented his state at the 2015 AFL Under 16 Championships and again at the 2017 AFL Under 18 Championships. Miller played local football with Railways in the Goldfields Football League and was a part of the club's premiership side in 2017. He also played junior representative football with Subiaco in the WAFL colts league.

== AFL career ==
Miller was drafted by Richmond with the club's fifth pick and the 63rd selection overall in the 2017 AFL national draft.

In 2019, Miller was a VFL premiership player while playing with Richmond's reserves side at the lower level.

After three-years on the Richmond list without playing a senior match, Miller was selected to make his AFL debut in the final round of 2021 season.

== Statistics ==
Updated to the end of round 22, 2026.

Legend
G	Goals	K	Kicks	D	Disposals	T	Tackles
B	Behinds	H	Handballs	M	Marks	H/O	Hit-outs

Season	Team	No.	Games	Totals								Averages (per game)								Votes
Season	Team	No.	Games	G	B	K	H	D	M	T	H/O	G	B	K	H	D	M	T	H/O	Votes
2018		46	0	—	—	—	—	—	—	—	—	—	—	—	—	—	—	—	—	0
2019		46	0	—	—	—	—	—	—	—	—	—	—	—	—	—	—	—	—	0
2020 (Note: The 2020 season was played with 17 home-and-away matches per team (down from 22) and 16-minute quarters with time on (down from 20-minute quarters with time on) due to the impact of the COVID-19 pandemic.)		46	0	—	—	—	—	—	—	—	—	—	—	—	—	—	—	—	—	0
2021	Richmond	46	1	0	0	4	2	6	2	0	0	0.0	0.0	4.0	2.0	6.0	2.0	0.0	0.0	0
2022	Richmond	46	11	3	0	51	41	92	30	29	47	0.3	0.0	4.6	3.7	8.4	2.7	2.6	4.3	0
2023	Richmond	46	13	6	3	49	46	95	31	28	115	0.5	0.2	3.8	3.5	7.3	2.4	2.2	8.8	0
2024	Richmond	46	21	0	0	178	80	258	120	34	0	0.0	0.0	8.5	3.8	12.3	5.7	1.6	0.0	0
2025	Richmond	12	23	0	0	211	75	286	140	40	2	0.0	0.0	9.2	3.3	12.4	6.1	1.7	0.1	0
2026	Richmond	12	19	0	0	195	73	268	116	27	3	0.0	0.0	10.3	3.8	14.1	6.1	1.4	0.2	0
Career			88	9	3	688	317	1005	439	158	167	0.1	0.0	7.8	3.6	11.4	5.0	1.8	1.9	0
