= Alice Edmonds =

Australian rules footballer

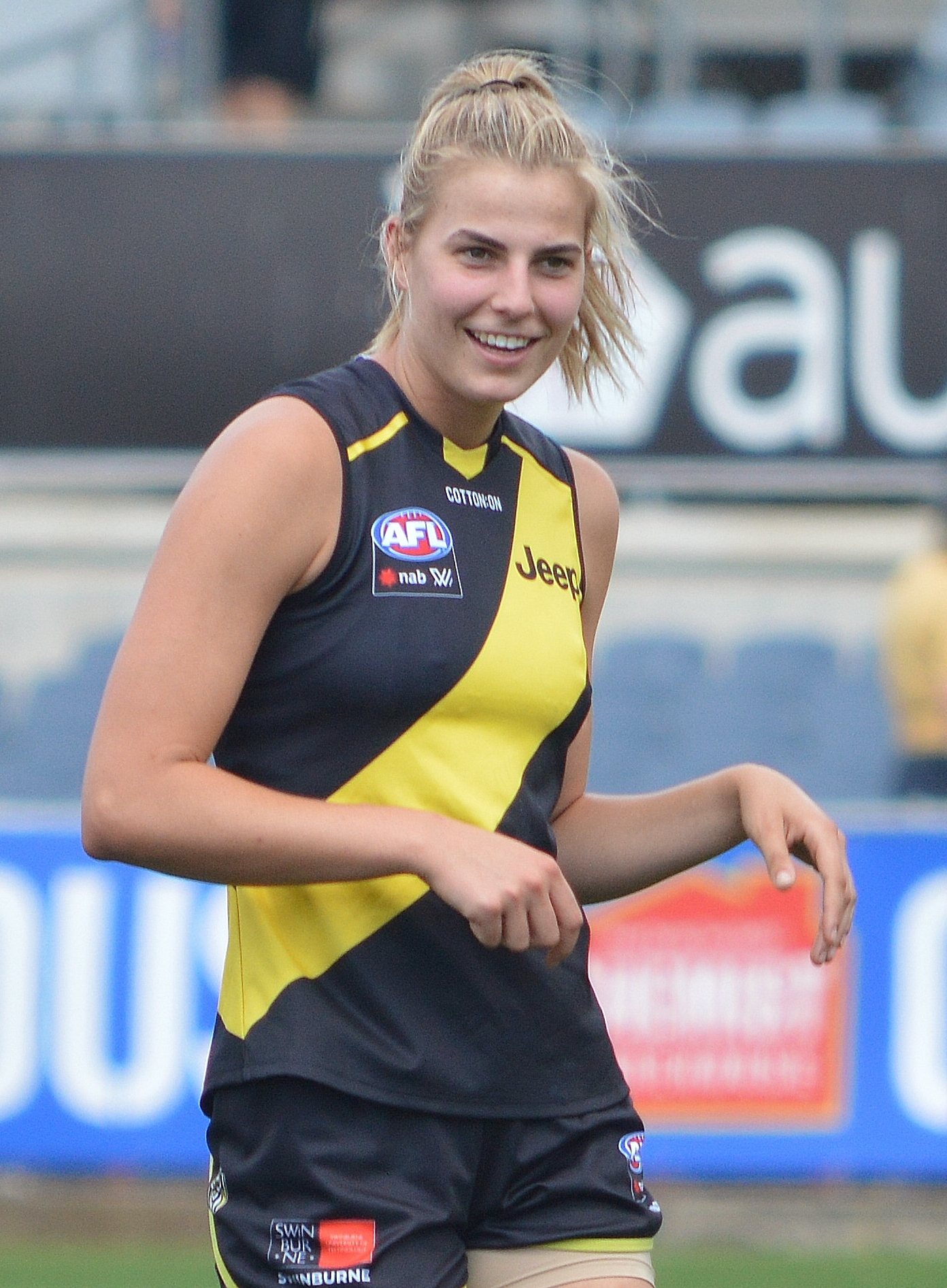
- Edmonds with Richmond in February 2020

Personal information
- Born: 31 May 1998 (age 28)
- Original team: Richmond (VFLW)
- Debut: Round 1, 2020, Richmond vs. Carlton, at Ikon Park
- Height: 189 cm (6 ft 2 in)
- Position: Ruck

Club information
- Current club: Western Bulldogs
- Number: 33

Playing career^{1}
Years	Club	Games (Goals)
2020–2021	Richmond	6 (0)
2022 (S6)–	Western Bulldogs	29 (3)
Total		35 (3)
- ^{1} Playing statistics correct to the end of the 2023 season.

Alice Edmonds (born 31 May 1998) is an Australian rules footballer who plays for the Western Bulldogs in the AFL Women's (AFLW). She formerly played for Richmond between 2020 and 2021. She played junior football for East Brighton Vampires and was educated at Caulfield Grammar School.

== AFLW career ==
Edmonds signed with Richmond during the first period of the 2019 expansion club signing period in June. She made her debut against Carlton at Ikon Park in the opening round of the 2020 season. She played all six matches in the 2020 season, but didn't play a single game the following season and was delisted by the club in June 2021. She was signed by the Bulldogs on 28 October 2021 as a replacement for Gabby Newton. She was given the #33 guernsey.

== Statistics ==
Statistics are correct to the end of round 8, 2022 season 7.

Legend
G	Goals	K	Kicks	D	Disposals	T	Tackles
B	Behinds	H	Handballs	M	Marks	H/O	Hit-outs

Season	Team	No.	Games	Totals								Averages (per game)							
Season	Team	No.	Games	G	B	K	H	D	M	T	H/O	G	B	K	H	D	M	T	H/O
2020	Richmond	11	6	0	1	8	22	30	4	11	82	0.0	0.2	1.3	3.7	5.0	0.7	1.8	13.7
2022 (S6)	Western Bulldogs	33	9	0	1	15	33	48	10	21	113	0.0	0.1	1.7	3.7	5.3	1.1	2.3	12.6
2022 (S7)	Western Bulldogs	33	8	0	0	26	42	68	18	33	219	0.0	0.0	3.3	5.3	8.5	2.3	4.1	27.4
Career			23	0	2	49	97	146	32	65	414	0.0	0.1	2.1	4.2	6.3	1.4	2.8	18.0
