= Will Martyn =

Australian rules football player (born 2001)

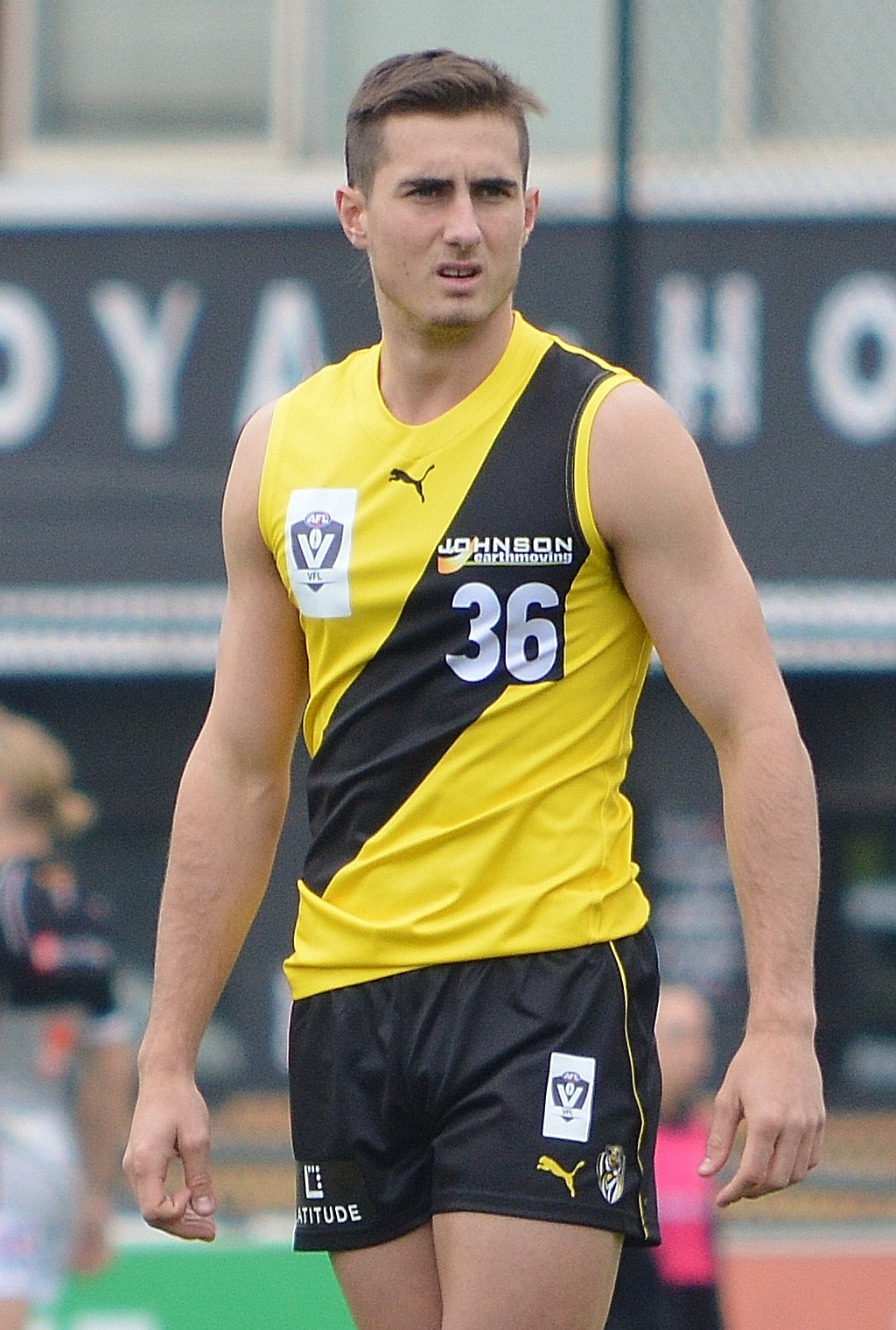
- Martyn with Richmond's VFL team in April 2021

Personal information
- Full name: William Martyn
- Born: 29 March 2001 (age 25)
- Original teams: Brisbane Lions Academy (NAB League Boys); Brisbane Lions reserves (NEAFL)
- Draft: No. 44, 2019 AFL draft
- Debut: Round 4, 2021, Richmond vs. Port Adelaide, at Adelaide Oval
- Height: 186 cm (6 ft 1 in)
- Weight: 82 kg (181 lb)
- Position: Midfielder

Playing career^{1}
Years	Club	Games (Goals)
2020–2022	Richmond	3 (0)
- ^{1} Playing statistics correct to the end of 2022 season.

Career highlights
- NEAFL premiership player: 2019; Brisbane Lions Academy captain: 2019; Brisbane Lions Academy MVP: 2019

William Martyn (born 29 March 2001) is a professional Australian rules footballer who played for the Richmond Football Club in the Australian Football League (AFL).

== Early life, junior football and state-league football ==
Martyn first played junior football for the Aspley Football Club's under eight division. He was a stand out player from an early age, joining the under 13 division of the Brisbane Lions Academy in 2014. He represented the Brisbane North region at State Academy Championships over coming years, including in 2015.

In 2016, Martyn represented Queensland at the Under 15 National Championships and was named best on ground in a premiership winning division 1 final with the Aspley Under 15 side that same year.

In 2018, Martyn represented Queensland at the Under 17 National Championships, where he was regularly the side's leading ball-winner and named in his team's best players on two occasions. He was one of three Queenslanders rewarded with All-Star selection at the end of that series, playing in an All-Star match at the MCG prior to that season's AFL Grand Final.

Martyn was one of 150 elite junior talents selected to participate in the AFL Academy in 2019, before captaining the Lions Academy side in the 2019 NAB League Boys season, averaging 29 disposals and four clearances a game across five matches and ultimately winning the side's MVP award. During the season, Martyn was named as part of a 26-player national under 18 squad to play against VFL side the Casey Demons in a one-off exhibition game.

That same year, he represented Queensland as part of Allies side at the 2019 AFL Under 18 Championships.

Following the tournament, Martyn was released by the Lions to play two senior NEAFL matches with rival side and his former junior club Aspley. Impressive performances saw Martyn recalled to the Lions, where he made a second NEAFL club debut that year alongside non-selected AFL players in the Brisbane Lions' reserves side. He remained with the side into its finals series and became a NEAFL premiership player in the club's grand final win over Southport.

=== AFL recruitment ===
Martyn was invited to participate in the 2019 AFL draft combine, where he recorded the ninth best two kilometre time trial time (Six minutes 16 seconds).

As a member of the Lions' academy, the club was given priority access to match any other club's bid on Martyn at the forthcoming AFL national draft.

Prior to the draft, Martyn was projected by ESPN's Chris Doerre to be bid on at pick 59 by Hawthorn, with the Brisbane Lions expected to pass on the chance to match the bid.

=== Junior statistics ===
Legend
G	Goals	K	Kicks	D	Disposals	T	Tackles
B	Behinds	H	Handballs	M	Marks

NAB League Boys

Season	Team	No.	Games	Totals							Averages (per game)						
Season	Team	No.	Games	G	B	K	H	D	M	T	G	B	K	H	D	M	T
2019	Brisbane Lions	11	5	1	—	96	48	144	36	23	0.2	—	19.2	9.6	28.8	7.2	4.6
Career			5	1	—	96	48	144	36	23	0.2	—	19.2	9.6	28.8	7.2	4.6

Under 18 National Championships

Season	Team	No.	Games	Totals							Averages (per game)						
Season	Team	No.	Games	G	B	K	H	D	M	T	G	B	K	H	D	M	T
2019	Allies	15	4	0	—	28	29	57	10	10	0.0	—	7.0	7.3	14.3	2.5	2.5
Career			4	0	—	28	29	57	10	10	0.0	—	7.0	7.3	14.3	2.5	2.5

== AFL career ==
=== 2020 season ===
Martyn was drafted by Richmond with the club's third pick and the 44th selection overall in the 2019 AFL national draft.

After a full pre-season, Martyn narrowly missed selection during the AFL pre-season series, instead being named as a non-playing AFL-level emergency on one occasion and participating in a VFL pre-season match with the club's reserves side in the first week of March. It was to be his final competitive match in many months though, as the following week's reserves match was cancelled due to safety concerns as a result of the rapid progression of the COVID-19 pandemic into Australia. Though the AFL season would start on schedule later that month, just one round of matches was played of the reduced 17-round season before the imposition of state border restrictions saw the season suspended for an indefinite hiatus. Martyn suffered a stress reaction in his foot upon a return to training in late-May, which saw him unable to participate at either level when the season eventually resumed after an 11-week hiatus. In early-July and while Martyn continued to undergo rehabilitation on the injury, a virus outbreak in Melbourne saw the club relocated to the Gold Coast. Martyn remained in Melbourne alongside the club's other junior contingent for the early weeks of that period, before joining his teammates in a second travelling party in late-July. In place of an official reserves competition that year, Martyn took part in unofficial scratch matches against other clubs' non-selected players after his return from injury in August. In round 14, Martyn was named a non-playing emergency at AFL level but ultimately spent the remainer of the season playing at reserves level. Martyn went without making an AFL debut that year, in what was a premiership-winning season for the club.

=== 2021 season ===
Martyn began 2021 in the frame for an early season debut, featuring in the club's first choice AFL lineup during an unofficial practice match against Melbourne in February and on limited minutes in the club's sole official pre-season series match against Collingwood in March. He was unable to secure a debut in round 1, instead being named as a non-playing emergency for the season opener while continuing to play pre-season matches with the club's reserves side in the VFL. Following an injury to midfielder Dion Prestia in round 3, Martyn was called up to senior level to make his debut in the club's round 4 match against Port Adelaide at the Adelaide Oval. After recording 12 disposals in the match, he was dropped back to reserves level the following week.

=== 2022 season ===
Martin did not play a game during the 2022 season and was subsequently delisted.

== Player profile ==
Martyn plays predominately as an inside ball-winning midfielder. With elite hands, he is also notable for his defensive running and ability to apply pressure to opposition ball carriers in contested situations.

== AFL statistics ==
Updated to the end of round 23, 2022.

Legend
G	Goals	K	Kicks	D	Disposals	T	Tackles
B	Behinds	H	Handballs	M	Marks

Season	Team	No.	Games	Totals							Averages (per game)						
Season	Team	No.	Games	G	B	K	H	D	M	T	G	B	K	H	D	M	T
2020	Richmond	36	0	—	—	—	—	—	—	—	—	—	—	—	—	—	—
2021	Richmond	36	3	0	0	14	12	26	6	3	0.0	0.0	4.7	4.0	8.7	2.0	1.0
2022	Richmond	36	0	—	—	—	—	—	—	—	—	—	—	—	—	—	—
Career			3	0	0	14	12	26	6	3	0.0	0.0	4.7	4.0	8.7	2.0	1.0

== Honours and achievements ==
=== NEAFL ===
- Premiership player: 2019

=== Junior ===
- Brisbane Lions Academy captain: 2019
- Brisbane Lions Academy MVP: 2019

=== Richmond Tigers (2020-) ===
Best and fairest: Richmond took Will Martyn with their third pick in the 2019 draft and he claimed the Guinane Medal in just his second season at the club, but 1st season of VFL (due to COVID-19) while also earning two AFL games. Martyn polled 28 votes to beat Lachlan Street (24), Derek Eggmolesse-Smith (22), Callum Coleman-Jones (21) and Samson Ryan (20).

== Personal life ==
Martyn's father Andrew played QAFL football with Windsor-Zillmere in the 1980s and 90s, as well as representing Queensland at state level. His maternal uncle Cameron Buchanan, played for Zillmere and received the QAFL Grogan medal in 1991

Martyn's paternal grandfather, William Ross Martyn played national level basketball with New Zealand in 1958.

Martyn's paternal aunty, Leigh Martyn, represented Queensland softball in the 1990s, winning three Gillies Shields, as well as numerous National Fastpitch league titles.
