= Laura McClelland =

Australian rules footballer

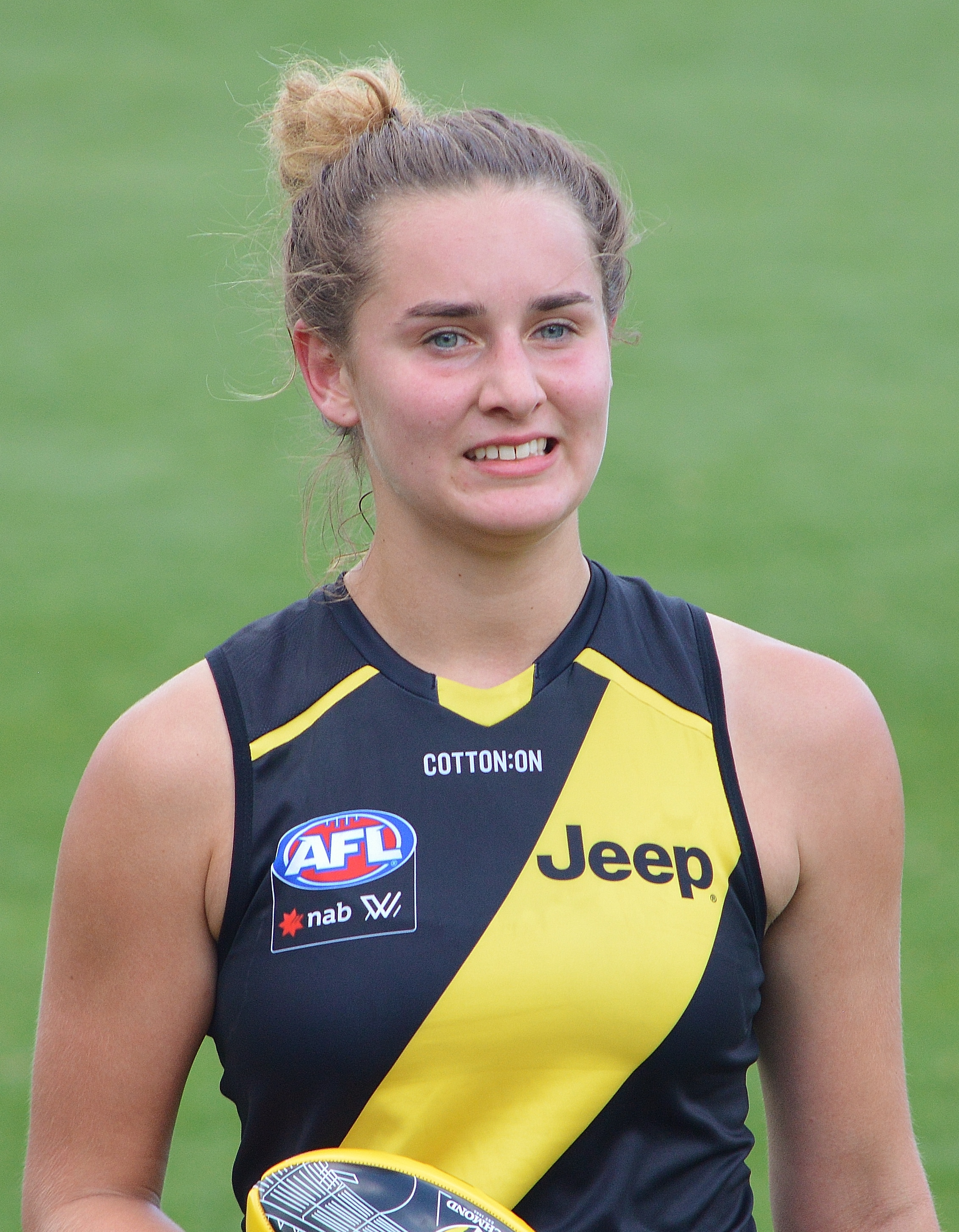
- McClelland with Richmond in February 2020

Personal information
- Born: 7 March 2001 (age 25)
- Original team: Eastern Ranges (NAB League Girls)
- Draft: No. 25, 2019 national draft
- Debut: Round 1, 2020, Richmond vs. Carlton, at Ikon Park
- Height: 172 cm (5 ft 8 in)
- Position: Tall utility

Club information
- Current club: Richmond
- Number: 16

Playing career^{1}
Years	Club	Games (Goals)
2020–	Richmond	30 (3)
- ^{1} Playing statistics correct to the end of the 2023 season.

Career highlights
- AFLW: Inaugural Richmond AFLW team: 2020; Junior: Under-18 All-Australian: 2019

Laura McClelland (born 3 July 2001) is an Australian rules footballer playing for the Richmond Football Club in the AFL Women's (AFLW). McClelland was drafted by Richmond with their second selection and twenty-fifth overall in the 2019 AFL Women's draft. She made her debut against Carlton at Ikon Park in the opening round of the 2020 season. She received a two-match suspension after pushing opponent Britt Tully into the turf in the round five loss to Greater Western Sydney.

== Statistics ==
Statistics are correct to round 3, 2022 season 6

Legend
G	Goals	K	Kicks	D	Disposals	T	Tackles
B	Behinds	H	Handballs	M	Marks

Season	Team	No.	Games	Totals							Averages (per game)						
Season	Team	No.	Games	G	B	K	H	D	M	T	G	B	K	H	D	M	T
2020	Richmond	16	5	1	1	13	17	30	6	13	0.2	0.2	2.6	3.4	6.0	1.2	2.6
2021	Richmond	16	3	0	0	17	6	23	3	3	0.0	0.0	5.7	2.0	7.7	1.0	1.0
2022 (S6)	Richmond	16	2	0	0	2	10	12	1	1	0.0	0.0	1.0	5.0	6.0	0.5	0.5
Career			10	1	1	32	33	65	10	17	0.1	0.1	3.2	3.3	6.5	1.0	1.7
