= Ella Wood =

Australian rules footballer

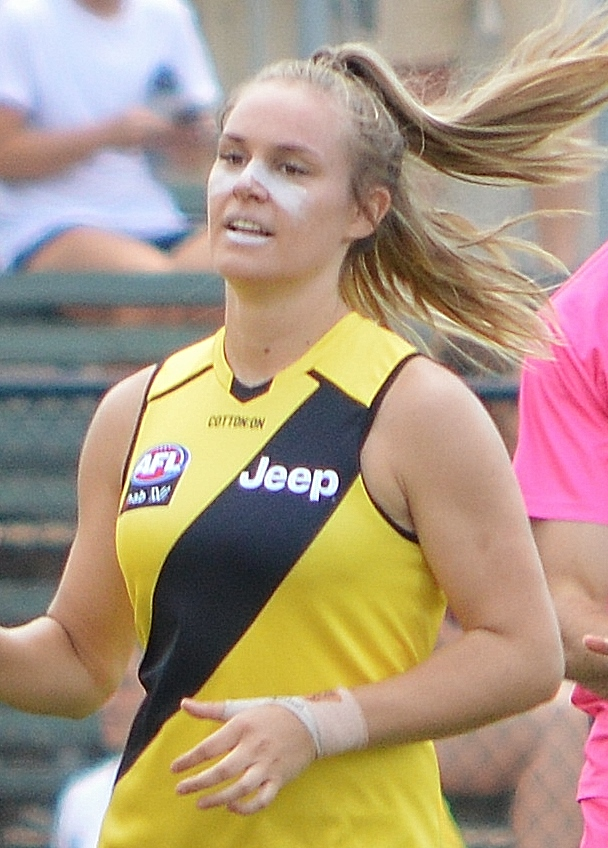
- Wood with Richmond in January 2020

Personal information
- Born: 14 February 2001 (age 25)
- Original team: GWV Rebels (NAB League Girls)
- Draft: No. 31, 2019 national draft
- Debut: Round 3, 2020, Richmond vs. North Melbourne, at Ikon Park
- Height: 164 cm (5 ft 5 in)
- Position: Wing/Midfield

Playing career^{1}
Years	Club	Games (Goals)
2020	Richmond	3 (0)
- ^{1} Playing statistics correct to the end of the 2020 season.

Ella Wood (born 14 February 2001) is a retired Australian rules footballer who played for Richmond in the AFL Women's (AFLW) competition.

== Early life, junior and state-league football ==
Wood played representative football at NAB League level with the Greater Western Victoria Rebels. In her 2019 season at the club, she was named among the club's best players in five of the seven matches she played. Wood represented Victoria Country at the 2019 AFL Women's Under 18 Championships.

She made her debut at VFL Women's level in 2019, playing a total of six seven matches with the Rebels-aligned Western Bulldogs including in a losing grand final.

== AFL Women's career ==
Wood was drafted by Richmond with the club's third pick and the 31st selection overall in the 2019 AFL Women's draft. She made her debut in round 3 of the 2020 season in match against North Melbourne at Ikon Park. In August 2020, Wood retired from football.

== Statistics ==
Statistics are correct to the end of the 2020 season.

Legend
G	Goals	K	Kicks	D	Disposals	T	Tackles
B	Behinds	H	Handballs	M	Marks

Season	Team	No.	Games	Totals							Averages (per game)						
Season	Team	No.	Games	G	B	K	H	D	M	T	G	B	K	H	D	M	T
2020	Richmond	17	3	0	1	8	6	14	2	7	0.0	0.3	2.7	2.0	4.7	0.7	2.3
Career			3	0	1	8	6	14	2	7	0.0	0.3	2.7	2.0	4.7	0.7	2.3
