= Grace Campbell (footballer) =

Australian rules footballer

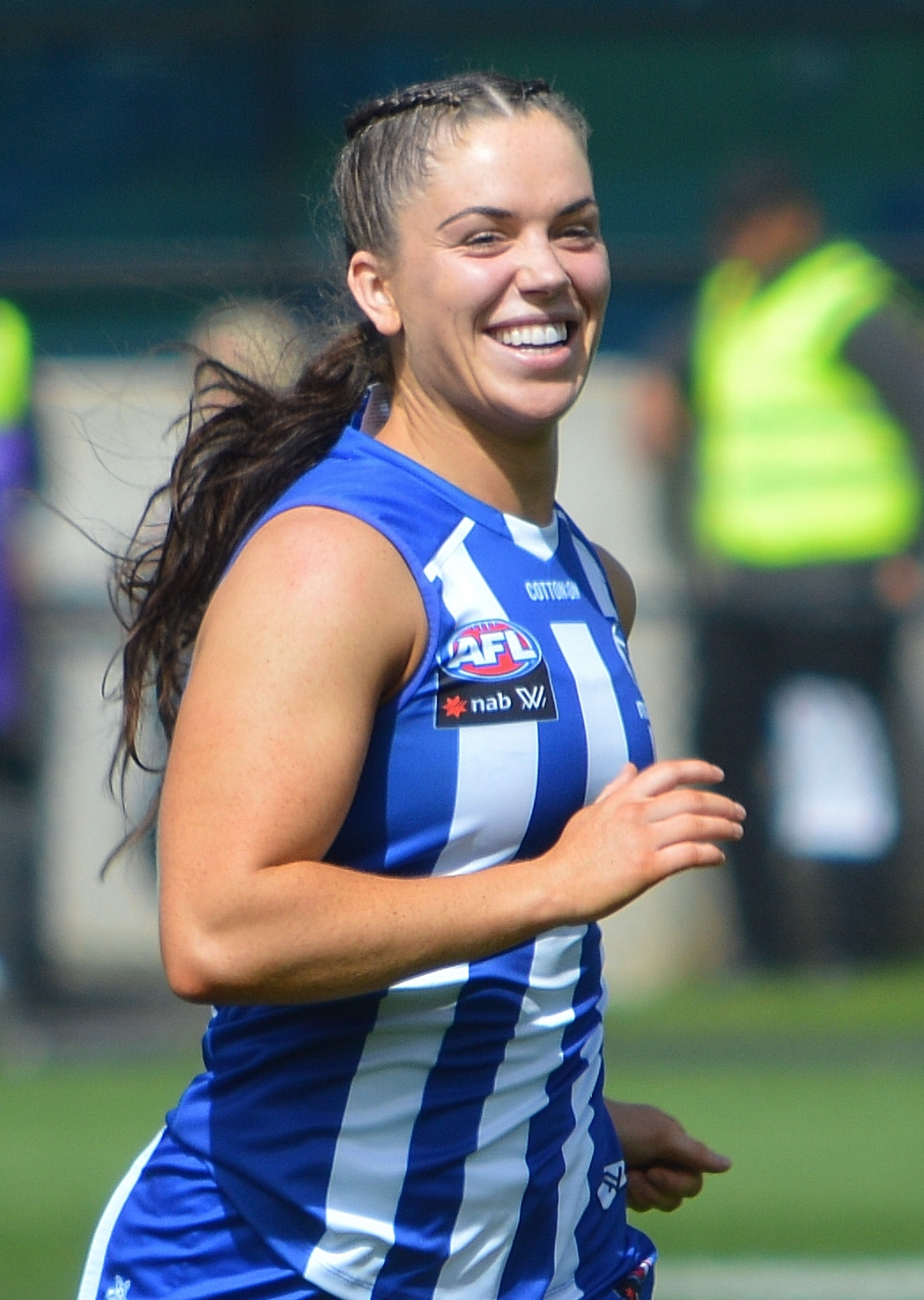
- Campbell with North Melbourne in March 2021

Personal information
- Nicknames: Cambo, Garec
- Born: 5 December 1995 (age 30)
- Original team: Richmond (VFL Women's)
- Draft: Expansion signing, 2019
- Debut: Round 2, 2020, Richmond vs. Gold Coast, at Metricon Stadium
- Height: 164 cm (5 ft 5 in)
- Position: Midfielder

Playing career^{1}
Years	Club	Games (Goals)
2020	Richmond	5 (0)
2021–2022 (S7)	North Melbourne	13 (2)
2023–2025	Collingwood	28 (9)
Total		46 (11)
- ^{1} Playing statistics correct to the end of the 2025 season.

Grace Campbell (born 5 December 1995) is an Australian rules footballer who last played for Collingwood in the AFL Women's competition (AFLW). She has previously played with Richmond in 2020 after playing with that club's VFL Women's team and with North Melbourne from 2021 until season seven. Campbell made her AFLW debut in round 2 of the 2020 season.

== State-league football ==
Campbell played football with the Bendigo Thunder in 2017, where she suffered a season-ending ACL injury. She made her return to football in 2019 after signing with Richmond's state-league VFL Women's side. In 2019 she played 10 matches with the team and averaged 13.5 disposals and 8.1 tackles per game.

== AFL Women's career ==
=== Richmond (2020) ===
Campbell was signed by Richmond's AFL Women's side as an Academy player in July 2019, ahead of the club's inaugural season in 2020.

In the pre-season training period, Campbell suffered a hip injury and failed to recover in time for selection for Richmond's inaugural AFLW match in round 1. She recovered in time to be available for round 2, where she was selected and made her AFLW debut.

=== North Melbourne (2021–S7 (2022)) ===
Following the conclusion of the 2020 season, Campbell was traded to North Melbourne in exchange for a late third round draft selection. It was revealed she signed on with the club for one more season on 17 June 2021, tying her to the club until the end of 2022.

=== Collingwood (2023–2025) ===
In March 2023, Campbell joined Collingwood as part of a three-club trade.

In December 2025, Collingwood announced they didn't offer Campbell a further contract for the 2026 AFL Women's season.

== Statistics ==
Statistics are correct to the end of the 2025 season.

Legend
G	Goals	K	Kicks	D	Disposals	T	Tackles
B	Behinds	H	Handballs	M	Marks

Season	Team	No.	Games	Totals							Averages (per game)						
Season	Team	No.	Games	G	B	K	H	D	M	T	G	B	K	H	D	M	T
2020	Richmond	43	5	0	1	30	32	62	3	28	0.0	0.2	6.0	6.4	12.4	0.6	5.6
2021	North Melbourne	43	8	2	3	39	36	75	14	35	0.3	0.4	4.9	4.5	9.4	1.8	4.4
2022 (S6)	North Melbourne	43	5	0	2	15	10	25	5	19	0.0	0.4	3.0	2.0	5.0	1.0	3.8
2022 (S7)	North Melbourne	43	0	—	—	—	—	—	—	—	—	—	—	—	—	—	—
2023	Collingwood	13	10	2	2	59	29	88	15	69	0.2	0.2	5.9	2.9	8.8	1.5	6.9
2024	Collingwood	13	7	3	1	51	15	66	7	49	0.4	0.1	7.3	2.1	9.4	1.0	7.0
2025	Collingwood	13	11	4	5	49	29	78	16	34	0.4	0.5	4.5	2.6	7.1	1.5	3.1
Career			46	11	14	243	151	394	60	234	0.2	0.3	5.3	3.3	8.6	1.3	5.1

== Personal life ==
Campbell is a keen keeper of goldfish. One is named 43. Campbell is trained as a registered nurse.
