= Kodi Jacques =

Australian rules footballer

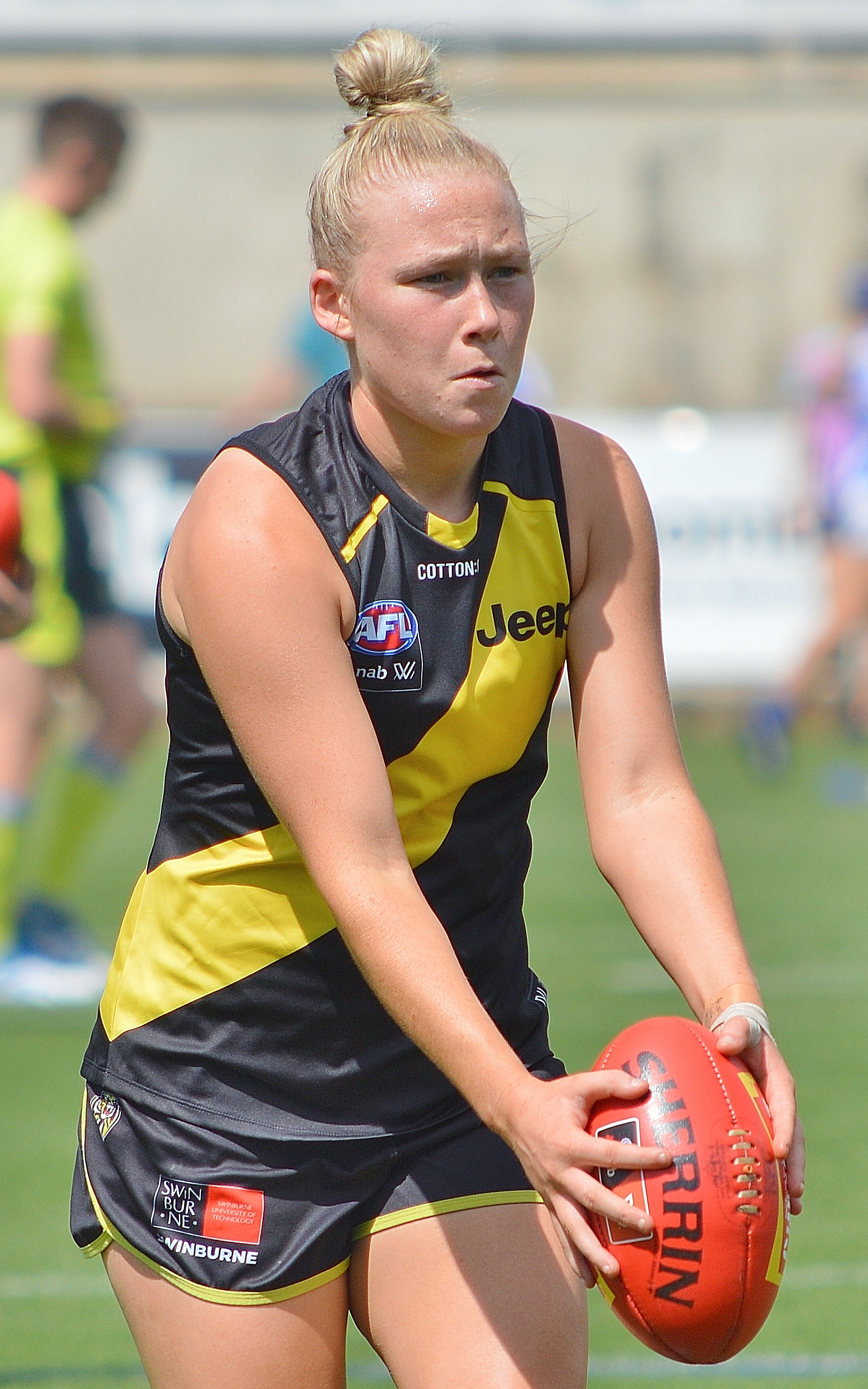
- Jacques with Richmond in February 2020

Personal information
- Born: 27 September 2000 (age 26)
- Original team: Richmond (VFLW)
- Debut: Round 1, 2020, Richmond vs. Carlton, at Ikon Park
- Height: 165 cm (5 ft 5 in)
- Position: Midfielder

Playing career^{1}
Years	Club	Games (Goals)
2020–2022 (S7)	Richmond	26 (3)
2023–2024	Essendon	15 (1)
Total		41 (4)
- ^{1} Playing statistics correct to the end of the 2024 season.

Kodi Jacques (born 27 September 2000) is an Australian rules footballer who has played for Richmond and Essendon in the AFL Women's (AFLW).

== Career ==
Jacques signed with Richmond during the first period of the 2019 expansion club signing period in August. She made her debut against Carlton at Ikon Park in the opening round of the 2020 season.

In March 2023, Jacques was traded to Essendon in exchange for a second round pick. She was delisted at the end of the 2024 season.

Jacques was previously in a relationship with AFLW player Tayla Harris.

== Statistics ==
Statistics are correct to round 3, 2022 season 6

Legend
G	Goals	K	Kicks	D	Disposals	T	Tackles
B	Behinds	H	Handballs	M	Marks

Season	Team	No.	Games	Totals							Averages (per game)						
Season	Team	No.	Games	G	B	K	H	D	M	T	G	B	K	H	D	M	T
2020	Richmond	10	6	1	0	37	12	49	7	32	0.2	0.0	6.2	2.0	8.2	1.2	5.3
2021	Richmond	10	9	1	2	37	29	66	7	20	0.1	0.2	4.1	3.2	7.3	0.8	2.2
2022 (S6)	Richmond	10	2	1	0	4	6	10	3	5	0.5	0.0	2.0	3.0	5.0	1.5	2.5
Career			17	3	2	78	47	125	17	57	0.2	0.1	4.6	2.8	7.4	1.0	3.4
