= Ciara Fitzgerald =

Australian rules footballer

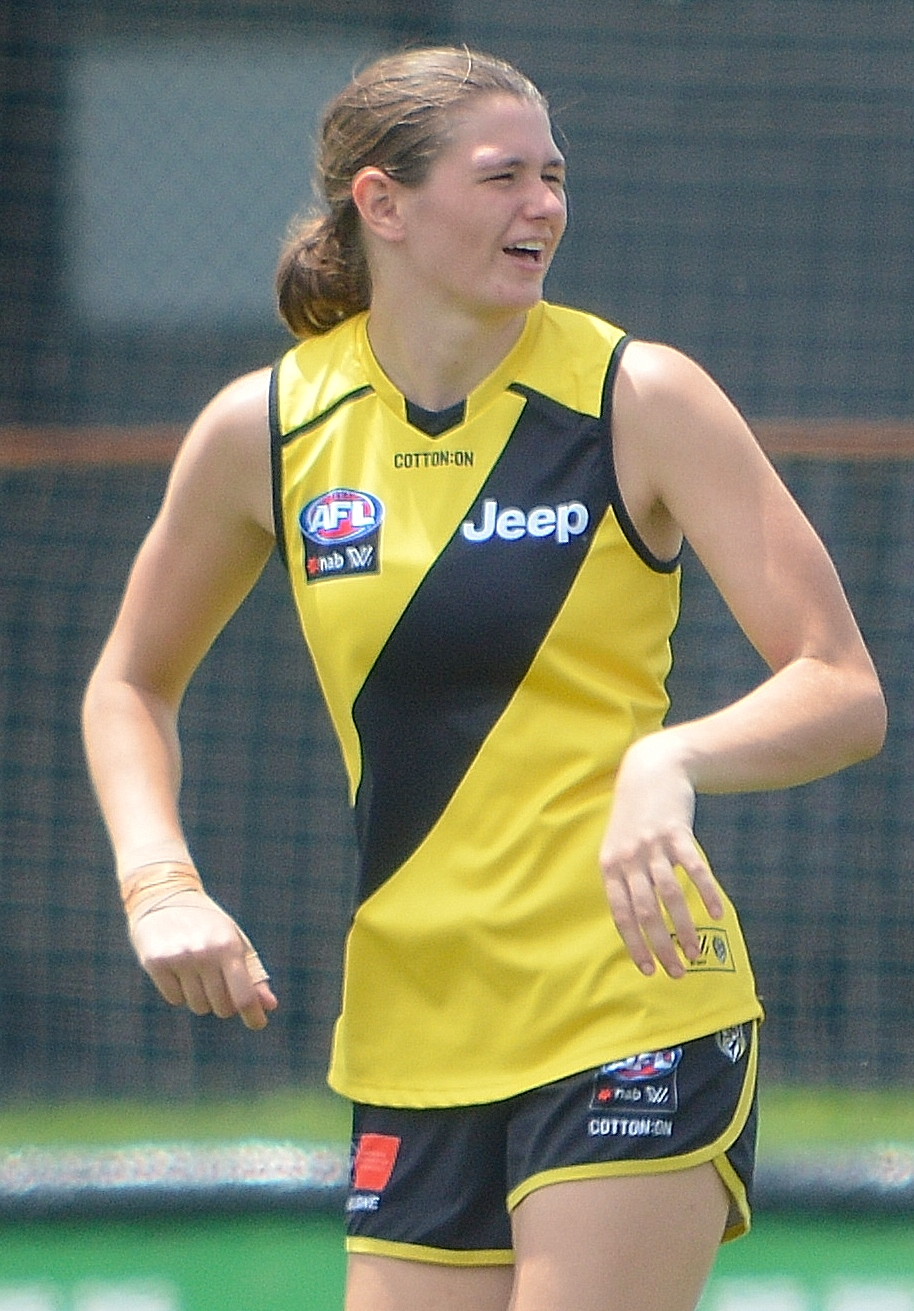
- Fitzgerald with Richmond in January 2020

Personal information
- Born: 20 August 2001 (age 25)
- Original team: Northern Knights (NAB League Girls)
- Draft: No. 87, 2019 national draft
- Debut: Round 6, 2020, Richmond vs. St Kilda, at RSEA Park
- Height: 170 cm (5 ft 7 in)
- Position: Defender

Club information
- Current club: Carlton
- Number: 36

Playing career^{1}
Years	Club	Games (Goals)
2020	Richmond	1 (0)
2023-	Carlton	0 (0)
- ^{1} Playing statistics correct to the end of the 2020 season.

Ciara Fitzgerald (born 20 August 2001) is an Australian rules footballer who plays for the Carlton Football Club in the AFL Women's. She played one match for Richmond after being drafted to the club with the club's 11th selection and the 87th pick overall in the 2019 AFL Women's draft. She made her debut against St Kilda at RSEA Park in round 6 2020, the club's final match of the season. At the end of the season, Fitzgerald was delisted by Richmond.

== Statistics ==
Statistics are correct to the end of the 2024 season.

Legend
G	Goals	K	Kicks	D	Disposals	T	Tackles
B	Behinds	H	Handballs	M	Marks

Season	Team	No.	Games	Totals							Averages (per game)						
Season	Team	No.	Games	G	B	K	H	D	M	T	G	B	K	H	D	M	T
2020	Richmond	26	1	0	0	2	0	2	0	2	0.0	0.0	2.0	0.0	2.0	0.0	2.0
2023	Carlton	36	6	0	0	34	14	48	17	18	0.0	0.0	5.7	2.3	8.0	2.8	3.0
2024	Carlton	36	10	0	2	67	38	105	32	40	0.0	0.2	6.7	3.8	10.5	3.2	4.0
Career			17	0	2	103	52	155	49	60	0.0	0.1	6.1	3.1	9.1	2.9	3.5
