= Laura Bailey (footballer) =

Australian rules footballer

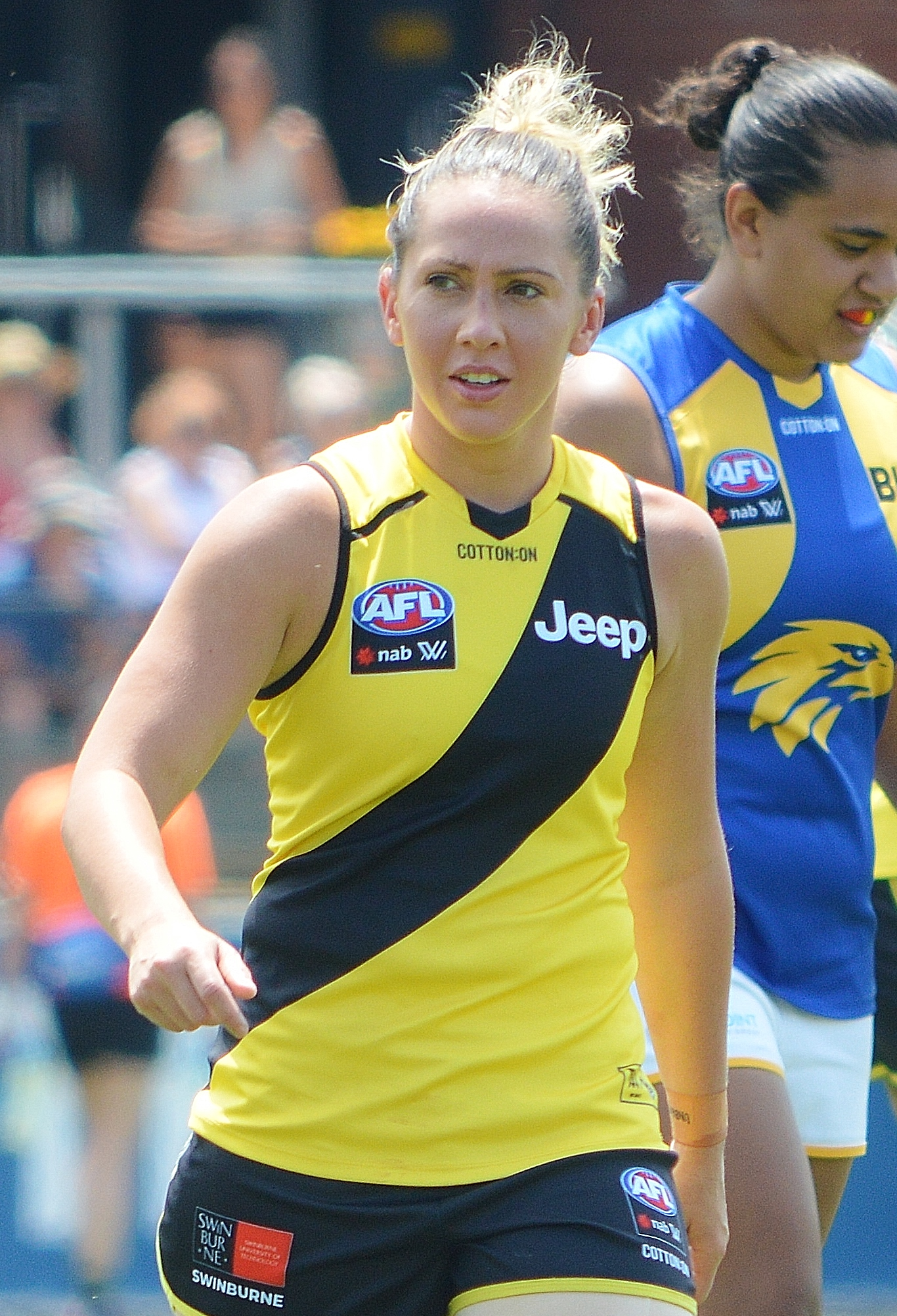
- Bailey with Richmond in January 2020

Personal information
- Born: 19 August 1992 (age 34)
- Original team: St Kilda Sharks (VFL Women's)
- Draft: No. 143, 2016 AFL Women's draft
- Debut: Round 1, 2017, Western Bulldogs vs. Fremantle, at VU Whitten Oval
- Height: 166 cm (5 ft 5 in)
- Position: Defender

Playing career^{1}
Years	Club	Games (Goals)
2017–2018	Western Bulldogs	8 (1)
2020	Richmond	5 (0)
Total		13 (1)
- ^{1} Playing statistics correct to the end of 2020 season.

Career highlights
- Inaugural Western Bulldogs AFLW team: 2017; Inaugural Richmond AFLW team: 2020

Laura Bailey (born 19 August 1992) is a retired Australian rules footballer who played for the Richmond Football Club in the AFL Women's competition (AFLW). She previously played eight matches over two seasons with the Western Bulldogs.

== AFL Women's career ==
=== Western Bulldogs (2017–2018) ===
Bailey was drafted by the Western Bulldogs with their 19th selection and 143rd overall in the 2016 AFL Women's draft. She made her debut in the thirty-two point win against Fremantle at VU Whitten Oval in the opening round of the 2017 season. She played six matches in her debut season and kicked one goal. She was delisted by the Western Bulldogs at the end of the 2018 season.

=== Richmond (2020) ===
Bailey was drafted by Richmond with the club's 8th selection and 71st pick overall in the 2019 AFL Women's draft. She made her Richmond debut against Carlton at Ikon Park in the opening round of the 2020 season. She announced her retirement on 27 March 2020.

== Statistics ==
Statistics are correct to the end of the 2020 season.

Legend
G	Goals	K	Kicks	D	Disposals	T	Tackles
B	Behinds	H	Handballs	M	Marks

Season	Team	No.	Games	Totals							Averages (per game)						
Season	Team	No.	Games	G	B	K	H	D	M	T	G	B	K	H	D	M	T
2017	Western Bulldogs	13	6	1	0	14	29	43	6	10	0.2	0.0	2.3	4.8	7.2	1.0	1.7
2018	Western Bulldogs	13	2	0	1	4	1	5	1	4	0.0	0.5	2.0	0.5	2.5	0.5	2.0
2019	—	—	—	—	—	—	—	—	—	—	—	—	—	—	—	—	—
2020	Richmond	12	5	0	2	17	14	31	5	6	0.0	0.1	3.4	2.8	6.2	1.0	1.2
Career			13	1	3	35	44	79	12	20	0.1	0.1	2.3	3.8	6.0	0.9	1.8
