= 2018 Richmond Football Club season =

Richmond Football Club
2018 season
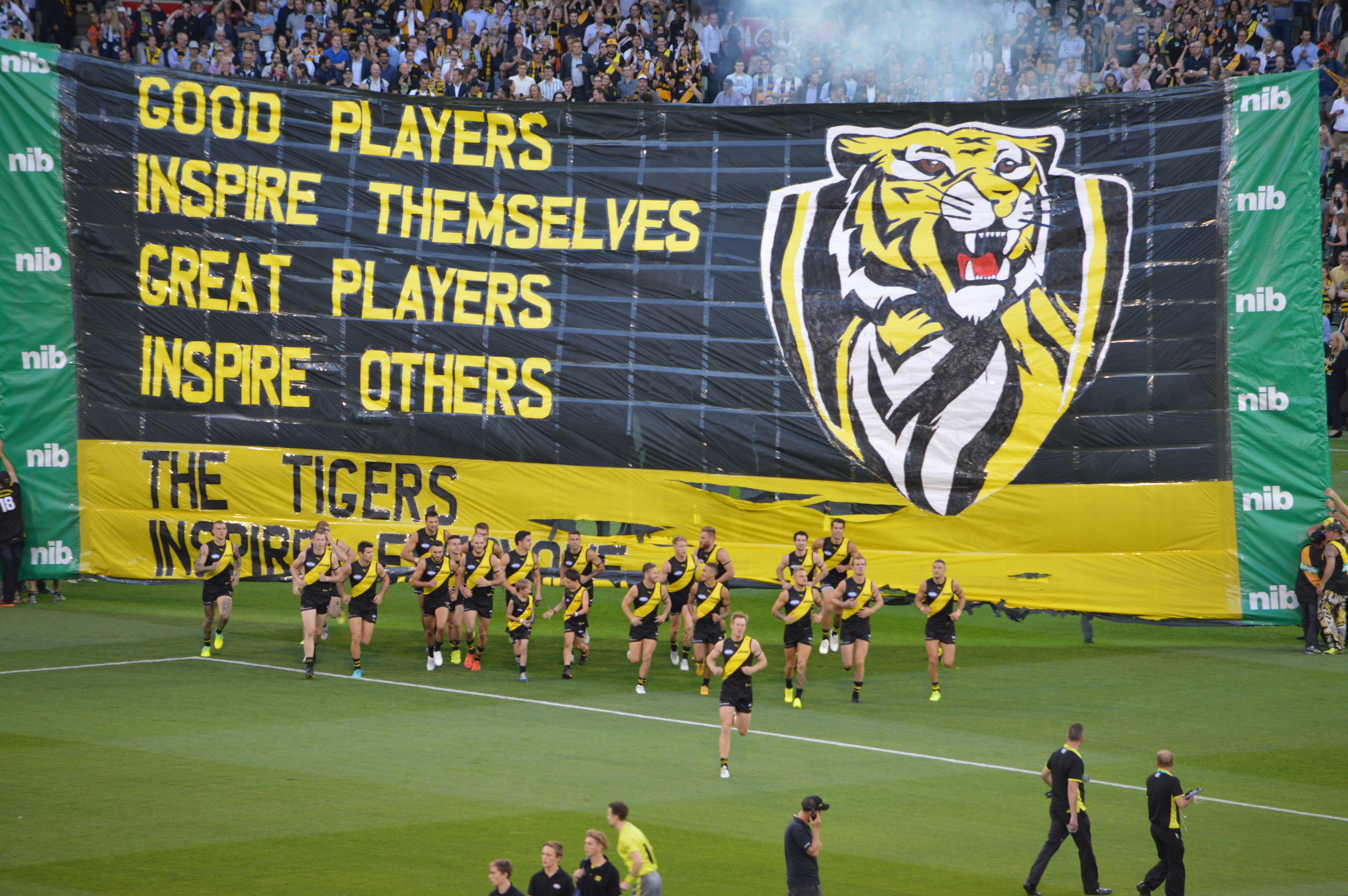
- Richmond players enter the MCG prior to their round 1 match with Carlton
- President: Peggy O'Neal^{(5th season)}
- Coach: Damien Hardwick^{(9th season)}
- Captains: Trent Cotchin^{(6th season)}
- Home ground: MCG
- Pre-season: 2-0
- AFL season: 18-4
- Finals series: 3rd^{(1-1)}
- Best and fairest: Jack Riewoldt
- Leading goalkicker: Jack Riewoldt^{(70)}
- Highest home attendance: 90,151^{(Round 1 vs. Carlton)}
- Lowest home attendance: 32,870^{(Round 4 vs. Brisbane Lions)}
- Average home attendance: 61,175^{(▲5,217 / ▲9.32%)}
- Club membership: 100,726^{(▲28,057 / ▲38.61%)}

The 2018 season was the 111th season in which the Richmond Football Club participated in the VFL/AFL.

== 2017 off-season list changes ==
=== Retirements and delistings ===
Player	Reason	Club games	Career games	Ref
Ivan Maric	Retired	80	157	
Ben Griffiths	Retired	63	63	
Steven Morris	Delisted	87	87	
Jake Batchelor	Delisted	84	84	
Taylor Hunt	Delisted	42	105	
Ben Lennon	Delisted	21	21	
Todd Elton	Delisted	10	10	

=== Trades ===
Date	Gained	Lost	Trade partner	Ref
19 October	Pick 53	2018 third round pick	Geelong	
19 October	Pick 20	Pick 15	Brisbane Lions	
19 October	Pick 25	Pick 52	Brisbane Lions	

=== National draft ===
Round	Overall pick	Player	State	Position	Team from	League from	Ref
1	17	Jack Higgins	VIC	Forward / midfielder	Oakleigh Chargers	TAC Cup	
2	20	Callum Coleman-Jones	SA	Ruck	Sturt	SANFL	
2	25	Noah Balta	VIC	Tall defender	Calder Cannons	TAC Cup	
2	34 (F/S)	Patrick Naish	VIC	Small defender / wing	Northern Knights	TAC Cup	
4	63	Ben Miller	WA	Ruck	Subiaco	WAFL	

=== Rookie draft ===
Round	Overall pick	Player	State	Position	Team from	League from	Ref
1	18	Liam Baker	WA	Small forward	Subiaco	WAFL	
Next Generation Academy zone selection (Indigenous)		Derek Eggmolesse-Smith	VIC	Small defender	Richmond VFL	VFL	

== 2018 squad ==
Richmond Football Club
Senior list		Rookie list	Coaching staff
1 Nick Vlastuin; 2 Dylan Grimes; 3 Dion Prestia; 4 Dustin Martin; 5 Brandon Ellis; 6 Shaun Grigg; 7 Dan Butler; 8 Jack Riewoldt (vc); 9 Trent Cotchin (c); 10 Shane Edwards; 11 Jason Castagna; 12 David Astbury; 14 Bachar Houli; 15 Jayden Short; 16 Shaun Hampson; 17 Daniel Rioli; 18 Alex Rance (vc); 21 Jacob Townsend; 22 Josh Caddy; 23 Kane Lambert	25 Toby Nankervis; 26 Anthony Miles; 27 Sam Lloyd; 28 Jack Higgins; 29 Shai Bolton; 30 Reece Conca; 31 Oleg Markov; 32 Corey Ellis; 33 Kamdyn McIntosh; 34 Jack Graham; 35 Nathan Broad; 37 Connor Menadue; 38 Noah Balta; 39 Nathan Drummond; 40 Callum Coleman-Jones; 42 Ryan Garthwaite; 45 Patrick Naish; 46 Ben Miller; 47 Ivan Soldo	36 Callum Moore; 41 Mabior Chol; 43 Derek Eggmolesse-Smith (B); 44 Tyson Stengle; 48 Liam Baker	Head coach: Damien Hardwick; Assistant coaches: Blake Caracella (midfield spread); Andrew McQualter (midfield stoppage); Justin Leppitsch (forwards); Ben Rutten (defence); Ivan Maric (ruck); Xavier Clarke (development); Ryan Ferguson (development); Craig McRae (VFL coach / development); Legend: (c) Captain(s); (vc) Vice-captain(s); (B) Category B rookie; Updated: 11 January 2018; Source(s): Senior list, Rookie list, Coaching staff

== 2018 season ==
=== Pre-season ===
==== AFLX ====
Match	Date	Score	Opponent	Opponent's score	Result	Venue	Attendance
1	Saturday 17 February, 4:10pm	3.2.7 (49)	Greater Western Sydney	2.2.2 (34)	Won by 15 points	Allianz Stadium	9,892
2	Saturday 17 February, 5:06pm	4.3.3 (61)	Brisbane Lions	4.4.7 (66)	Lost by 5 points	Allianz Stadium	9,892

==== JLT Community Series ====
Match	Date	Score	Opponent	Opponent's score	Result	Home/away	Venue	Attendance
1	Saturday 24 February, 4:35pm	19.10 (124)	Essendon	5.7 (37)	Won by 87 points	Away	Norm Minns Oval, Wangaratta	7,681
2	Wednesday 7 March, 7:05pm	19.14 (128)	North Melbourne	8.10 (58)	Won by 70 points	Home	Ikon Park	4,197

=== Home and away season ===
Round	Date	Score	Opponent	Opponent's score	Result	Home/away	Venue	Attendance	Ladder
1	Thursday 22 March, 7:25pm	17.19 (121)	Carlton	15.5 (95)	Won by 26 points	Home	MCG	90,151	7th
2	Thursday 29 March, 7:20pm	12.10 (82)	Adelaide	18.10 (118)	Lost by 36 points	Away	Adelaide Oval	49,743	12th
3	Sunday 8 April, 1:10pm	15.12 (102)	Hawthorn	13.11 (89)	Won by 13 points	Home	MCG	70,701	9th
4	Saturday 14 April, 2:10pm	16.14 (110)	Brisbane Lions	2.5 (17)	Won by 93 points	Home	MCG	32,870	3rd
5	Tuesday 24 April 7:25pm	15.12 (102)	Melbourne	8.8. (56)	Won by 46 points	Away	MCG	77,071	1st
6	Sunday 29 April, 3:20pm	16.17 (113)	Collingwood	10.10 (70)	Won by 43 points	Away	MCG	72,157	1st
7	Sunday 6 May, 1:10pm	15.20 (110)	Fremantle	4.9 (33)	Won by 77 points	Home	MCG	43,240	1st
8	Sunday 13 May, 1:10pm	12.10 (82)	North Melbourne	11.6 (72)	Won by 10 points	Away	Etihad Stadium	29,153	1st
9	Sunday 20 May, 2:40pm	12.11 (83)	West Coast	20.10 (130)	Lost by 47 points	Away	Optus Stadium	57,616	2nd
10	Saturday 26 May, 1:45pm	15.15 (105)	St Kilda	12.5 (77)	Won by 28 points	Home	MCG	48,850	2nd
11	Saturday 2 June, 7:25pm	17.12 (114)	Essendon	6.7 (43)	Won by 71 points	Away	MCG	81,046	2nd
12	Friday 8 June, 7:20pm	8.10 (58)	Port Adelaide	10.12 (72)	Lost by 14 points	Away	Adelaide Oval	39,936	2nd
13	Sunday 17 June, 3:20pm	12.11 (83)	Geelong	9.11 (65)	Won by 18 points	Away	MCG	46,423	1st
14	BYE								1st
15	Thursday 28 June, 7:20pm	14.9 (93)	Sydney	11.1 (67)	Won by 26 points	Home	Etihad Stadium	43,519	1st
16	Friday 6 July, 7:50pm	15.13 (103)	Adelaide	8.8 (56)	Won by 47 points	Home	MCG	54,934	1st
17	Saturday 14 July, 7:25pm	10.17 (77)	Greater Western Sydney	11.13 (79)	Lost by 2 points	Away	Spotless Stadium	14,456	1st
18	Friday 20 July, 7:50pm	16.15 (111)	St Kilda	8.9 (57)	Won by 54 points	Away	Etihad Stadium	36,269	1st
19	Saturday 28 July, 1:45pm	16.9 (105)	Collingwood	12.5 (77)	Won by 28 points	Home	MCG	88,180	1st
20	Friday 3 August, 7:50pm	12.13 (85)	Geelong	12.10 (82)	Won by 3 points	Home	MCG	67,054	1st
21	Saturday 11 August, 2:10pm	19.11 (125)	Gold Coast	7.9 (51)	Won by 74 points	Away	Metricon Stadium	18,102	1st
22	Friday 17 August, 7:50pm	12.9 (81)	Essendon	11.7 (73)	Won by 8 points	Home	MCG	76,424	1st
23	Saturday 25 August, 2:10pm	15.8 (98)	Western Bulldogs	14.11 (95)	Won by 3 points	Home	MCG	56,998	1st

=== Finals ===
Match	Date	Score	Opponent	Opponent's Score	Result	Home/Away	Venue	Attendance
Qualifying final	Thursday 7 September, 7:20pm	13.17 (95)	Hawthorn	9.10 (64)	Won by 31 points	Home	MCG	91,446
Preliminary final	Friday 21 September, 7:50 pm	8.10 (58)	Collingwood	15.7 (97)	Lost by 39 points	Home	MCG	94,959

== Ladder ==
Pos	Team	Pld	W	L	D	PF	PA	PP	Pts	Qualification
1	Richmond	22	18	4	0	2143	1574	136.1	72	2018 finals
2	West Coast (P)	22	16	6	0	2012	1657	121.4	64	2018 finals
3	Collingwood	22	15	7	0	2046	1699	120.4	60	2018 finals
4	Hawthorn	22	15	7	0	1972	1642	120.1	60	2018 finals
5	Melbourne	22	14	8	0	2299	1749	131.4	56	2018 finals
6	Sydney	22	14	8	0	1822	1664	109.5	56	2018 finals
7	Greater Western Sydney	22	13	8	1	1898	1661	114.3	54	2018 finals
8	Geelong	22	13	9	0	2045	1554	131.6	52	2018 finals
9	North Melbourne	22	12	10	0	1950	1790	108.9	48	
10	Port Adelaide	22	12	10	0	1780	1654	107.6	48	
11	Essendon	22	12	10	0	1932	1838	105.1	48	
12	Adelaide	22	12	10	0	1941	1865	104.1	48	
13	Western Bulldogs	22	8	14	0	1575	2037	77.3	32	
14	Fremantle	22	8	14	0	1556	2041	76.2	32	
15	Brisbane Lions	22	5	17	0	1825	2049	89.1	20	
16	St Kilda	22	4	17	1	1606	2125	75.6	18	
17	Gold Coast	22	4	18	0	1308	2182	59.9	16	
18	Carlton	22	2	20	0	1353	2282	59.3	8	

Source: AFL
Rules for classification: 1) points; 2) percentage; 3) number of points for.
(P) Premiers

== Awards ==
=== League awards ===
==== All-Australian team ====
	Player	Position	Appearance
Named	Dustin Martin	Centre	3rd
Named	Alex Rance	Full-back	5th
Named	Jack Riewoldt	Full-forward	3rd
Named	Shane Edwards	Bench	1st
Nominated	Josh Caddy	-	-
Nominated	Trent Cotchin	-	-
Nominated	Dylan Grimes	-	-
Nominated	Kane Lambert	-	-

==== Brownlow Medal tally ====
Player	3 vote games	2 vote games	1 vote games	Total votes	Place
Dustin Martin	2	6	1	19	6th
Kane Lambert	2	2	2	12	28th
Trent Cotchin	2	1	2	10	35th
Jack Riewoldt	2	1	2	10	35th
Shane Edwards	1	1	2	7	55th
Josh Caddy	0	2	2	6	64th
Dion Prestia	1	0	0	3	105th
Toby Nankervis	1	0	0	3	105th
Shaun Grigg	0	1	0	2	142nd
Nick Vlastuin	0	1	0	2	142nd
Daniel Rioli	0	0	1	1	169th
Jayden Short	0	0	1	1	169th
David Astbury	0	0	1	1	169th
Reece Conca	0	0	1	1	169th
Total	11	15	15	78	-

==== Rising Star ====
Nominations:

Round	Player	Placing	Ref
18	Jack Higgins	4th	

==== 22 Under 22 team ====
	Player	Position	Appearance
Named	Jayden Short	Half-back	1st
Named	Dan Butler	Bench	2nd

=== Club awards ===
==== Jack Dyer Medal ====
Position	Player	Votes	Medal
1st	Jack Riewoldt	81	Jack Dyer Medal
2nd	Kane Lambert	68	Jack Titus Medal
3rd	Dustin Martin	66	Maurie Fleming Medal
4th	Shane Edwards	65	Fred Swift Medal
5th	Dylan Grimes	64	Kevin Bartlett Medal
6th	Alex Rance	63	
7th	Trent Cotchin	58	
8th	Nick Vlastuin	51	
9th	Jayden Short	47	
10th	Josh Caddy	45	

==== Michael Roach Medal ====
Position	Player	Goals
1st	Jack Riewoldt	70
2nd	Josh Caddy	46
3rd	Dustin Martin	31
4th	Jason Castagna	26
5th	Dan Butler	18

== Reserves ==
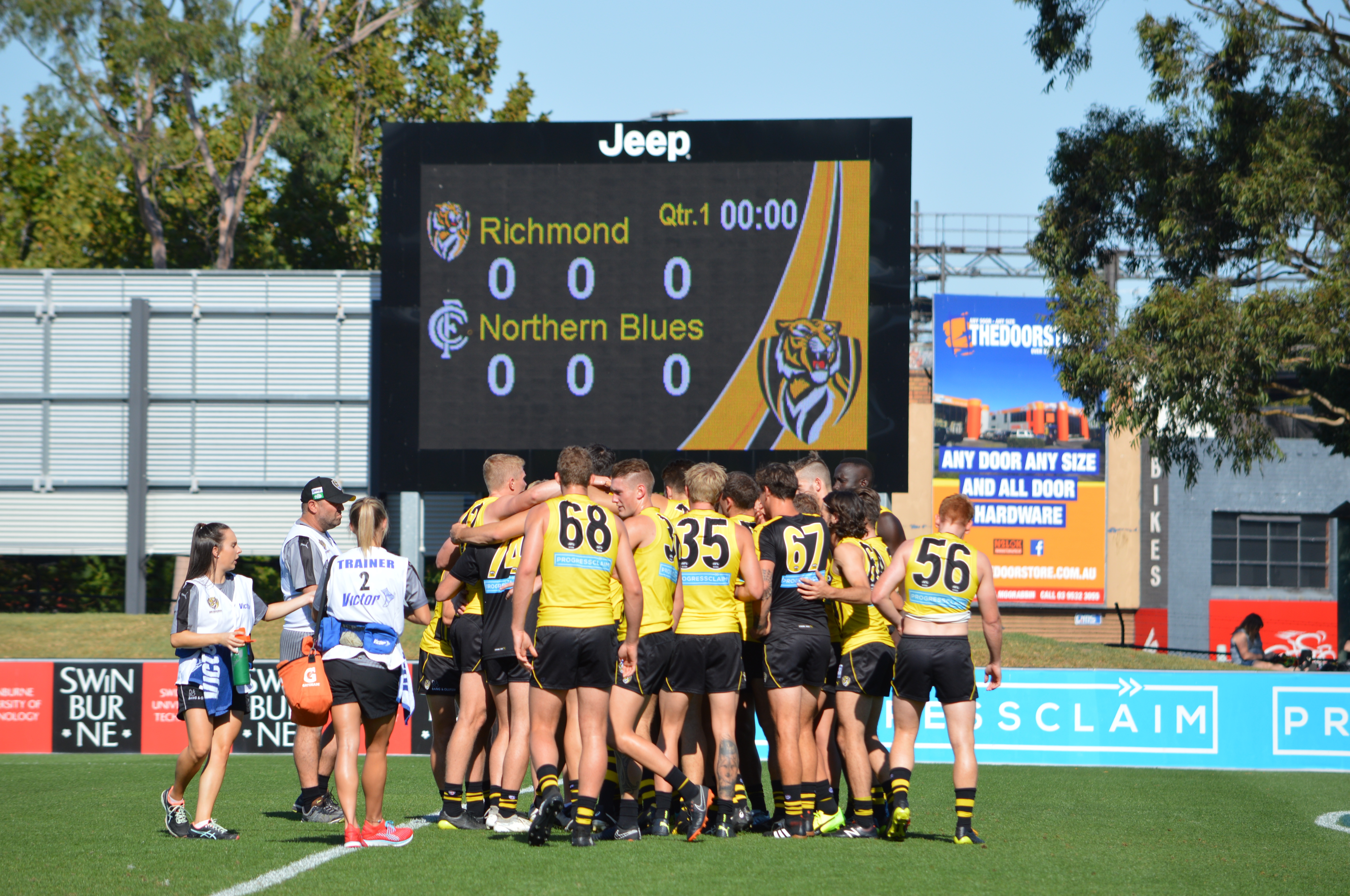
The reserves side playing a practice match against the Northern Blues in March 2018

The 2018 season marked the fifth consecutive year the Richmond Football club ran a stand-alone reserves team in the Victorian Football League (VFL). Richmond senior and rookie-listed players who were not selected to play in the AFL side were eligible to play for the team alongside a small squad of VFL-only listed players. The team was captained by former AFL listed defender Steve Morris. Hugh Beasley, Jake Aarts, Jacob Ballard and Tom Silvestro are also in the team's 2018 leadership group.

The team finished the home and away season with 14 wins and four losses, earning the minor premiership as a result. They were eliminated from the finals series after successive qualifying and semi finals matches against Williamstown and Essendon respectively.

AFL-listed midfielder Anthony Miles won the club's best and fairest award for the second year running, along with the league's best and fairest award, the J. J. Liston Trophy. AFL-listed small forward Tyson Stengle led the team's goal-kicking with 33 across his 19 matches. Another AFL-listed small forward, Shai Bolton, received both the league's Mark and Goal of the Year awards.

=== Playing squad ===
Richmond Football Club (reserves)
Playing list		Coaching staff
51 Steven Morris (c); 52 Shaun Mannagh; 53 Hugh Beasley; 54 Jacob Ballard; 55 Ryan Bathie; 56 Blake Grewar; 57 Brandon Wood; 58 Jake Aarts; 59 Harry Tanner; 60 Charlie Thompson; 61 James Fletcher; 62 Max O'Sullivan	64 Thomas Silvestro; 65 Joel Cusack; 66 Harry Conway; 67 Brenton Credlin; 68 Connor Riley; 69 Chris Grigoriadis; 70 Danko Bzenic; 72 Bailey Lambert; 73 Joel Ernest; 74 Rueben Hayward; 78 Daniel Coffield; 79 Billy Coates	Head coach: Craig McRae; Assistant coaches: Paul Griffiths (forwards); Xavier Clarke (midfield); Ryan Ferguson (backline); Tom Langford (development); Steven Morris (development); Marc Sophoulis (coaching coordinator); Legend: (c) Captain(s); (vc) Vice-captain(s); Updated: 27 March 2017; Source(s): Playing list, Coaching staff

== Women's team ==
The 2018 season marked the first year the Richmond Football club ran a women's team and the first year in the VFL Women's competition (VFLW). Former men's VFL assistant coach Tom Hunter was named the team's head coach in November 2017. Jess Kennedy was named the team's inaugural captain in May 2018. The team finished the season with four wins and 10 losses, placing 11th on the ladder of 13 teams and failing to qualify for the finals competition.

=== Playing squad ===
Richmond Football Club (VFLW)
Playing list		Coaching staff
51 Jess Kennedy (c); 52 Elise Hogan (vc); 53 Kate Dixon (vc); 54 Courtney Musico; 55 Alana Woodward; 56 Kate Dempsey; 57 Trish Muller; 58 Jacqueline Graham; 59 Emma Gunn; 60 Emma King; 61 Alice Edmonds; 62 Georgia Fisher; 63 Evelyn Burry; 64 Jenna Colwell; 65 Courtney Wakefield; 66 Emily Findlay; 67 Natarsha Bamblett; 68 Lisa Davie	69 Bethany Lynch; 70 Lauren Tesoriero; 71 Ella Ross; 72 Jacinta Louttit; 73 Justine Hocking; 74 Vittoriana Tonin; 75 Ellie George; 76 Grace Bibby; 77 Jess Gardner; 78 Louise Stephenson; 79 Louise Bieniara; 80 Nuala Clarke; 81 Niamh Clarke; 82 Kirra Grimes; 83 Amelia Barden; 87 Jessica Provan; 88 Grace Egan; 89 Sophie Damon	Head coach: Tom Hunter; Assistant coaches: Shaun Smith; Paul Griffiths; Legend: (c) Captain(s); (vc) Vice-captain(s); Updated: 5 May 2018; Source(s): Playing list, Coaching staff

=== VFLW Best and Fairest ===
Position	Player	Votes
1st	Jess Kennedy	49
2nd	Jacqui Graham	48
3rd	Evelyn Burry	45
3rd	Lisa Davie	45
3rd	Phoebe Monahan	45
