= Jessica Kennedy =

Jessica Kennedy may refer to:

- Jessica Parker Kennedy, actress
- Jessica Kennedy, character in Bad Behaviour
- Jess Kennedy, Australian rules footballer
