= 2017 AFL Under 18 Championships =

Youth Australian rules football competition

- Teams: 11

Division 1
- Teams: 5
- Champions: Vic Metro
- Larke Medal: Oscar Allen

Academy series
- Teams: 6
- Hunter Harrison Medal: Nick Blakey

The 2017 NAB AFL Under 18 Championships was the 22nd edition of the AFL Under 18 Championships.

For the previous two decades, the Under-18 Championships had been split into two divisions – with traditional football regions Vic Metro, Vic Country, Western Australia and South Australia in the top tier division one and Queensland, NSW-ACT, Tasmania and the Northern Territory in division two. However, with the growth in the strength of the northern academies, the division two carnival was changed to a five-round competition between the four academy clubs (Brisbane Lions, Gold Coast Suns, Greater Western Sydney Giants, Sydney Swans), Tasmania and the Northern Territory. The AFL believed the developing depth in Queensland and NSW-ACT had made the division two carnival uneven in recent years, with a gap growing between those states and Tasmania and the NT. Also, the academy-based format allowed more players in the northern clubs' under-18 systems to impress at a higher level.

An Australian Alliance side (made up of players from the division two competition) was introduced as a division one team. This was designed to give the best prospects from those regions the opportunity to play at a national level in the division one carnival, which took place after the academy series was finished. Thus, division one was made up of 5 teams - Australian Alliance, South Australia, Vic Country, Vic Metro and Western Australia - playing each other across 5 rounds.

Vic Metro won the division one title for the second year in a row, with Western Australian, Oscar Allen winning the Larke Medal as the division one best player. Sydney Swans academy member Nick Blakey won the Hunter Harrison Medal for the best player in the Under 18 Academy Series (Formerly Division 2).

== Fixture ==
=== Division 1 ===
	Round 1
Saturday, 10 June	Western Australia 10.14 (74)	def.	South Australia 10.13 (73)	Domain Stadium	Report
Sunday, 11 June	Australian Alliance 8.8 (56)	def. by	Vic Country 10.8 (68)	Blacktown ISP Oval	Report
	Bye; Vic Metro

	Round 2
Saturday, 17 June	South Australia 17.10 (112)	def.	Australian Alliance 9.7 (61)	Adelaide Oval	Report
Sunday, 18 June	Western Australia 9.4 (58)	def. by	Vic Metro 14.12 (96)	Domain Stadium	Report
	Bye; Vic Country

	Round 3
Saturday, 24 June	Vic Metro 15.7 (97)	def.	Vic Country 11.9 (75)	Punt Road Oval	Report
Sunday, 25 June	Western Australia 12.12 (84)	def.	Australian Alliance 6.8 (44)	Leederville Oval	Report
	Bye; South Australia

	Round 4
Friday, 30 June	Vic Metro 18.7 (115)	def.	South Australia 6.12 (48)	Etihad Stadium	Report
Friday, 30 June	Vic Country 7.11 (53)	def. by	Western Australia 12.10 (82)	Etihad Stadium	Report
	Bye; Australian Alliance

	Round 5
Wednesday, 5 July	Vic Metro 10.13 (73)	def. by	Australian Alliance 11.10 (76)	Simonds Stadium	Report
Wednesday, 5 July	Vic Country 9.11 (65)	def. by	South Australia 16.15 (111)	Simonds Stadium	Report
	Bye; Western Australia

== All-Australian team ==
The 2017 All-Australian team

2017 Under 18 All-Australian team
B:	Ben Paton (VC)	Oscar Clavarino (VC)	Sam Taylor (WA)
HB:	Charlie Constable (VM)	Aaron Naughton (WA)	Nick Coffield (VM)
C:	Patrick Naish (VM)	Brayden Ainsworth (WA)	Izak Rankine (SA)
HF:	Zac Bailey (All)	Jarrod Brander (All)	Jack Higgins (VM)
F:	Callum Coleman-Jones (SA)	Oscar Allen (WA)	Dylan Moore (VM)
Foll:	Brayden Crossley (All)	Cameron Rayner (VM)	Paddy Dow (VC)
Int:	Sam Hayes (VM)	Lachie Fogarty (VM)	Harrison Petty (SA)
Int:	James Worpel (VC)	Joel Garner (VM)	
Coach:	Martin Allison (VM)		
