= James Worpel =

Australian rules footballer (born 1999)

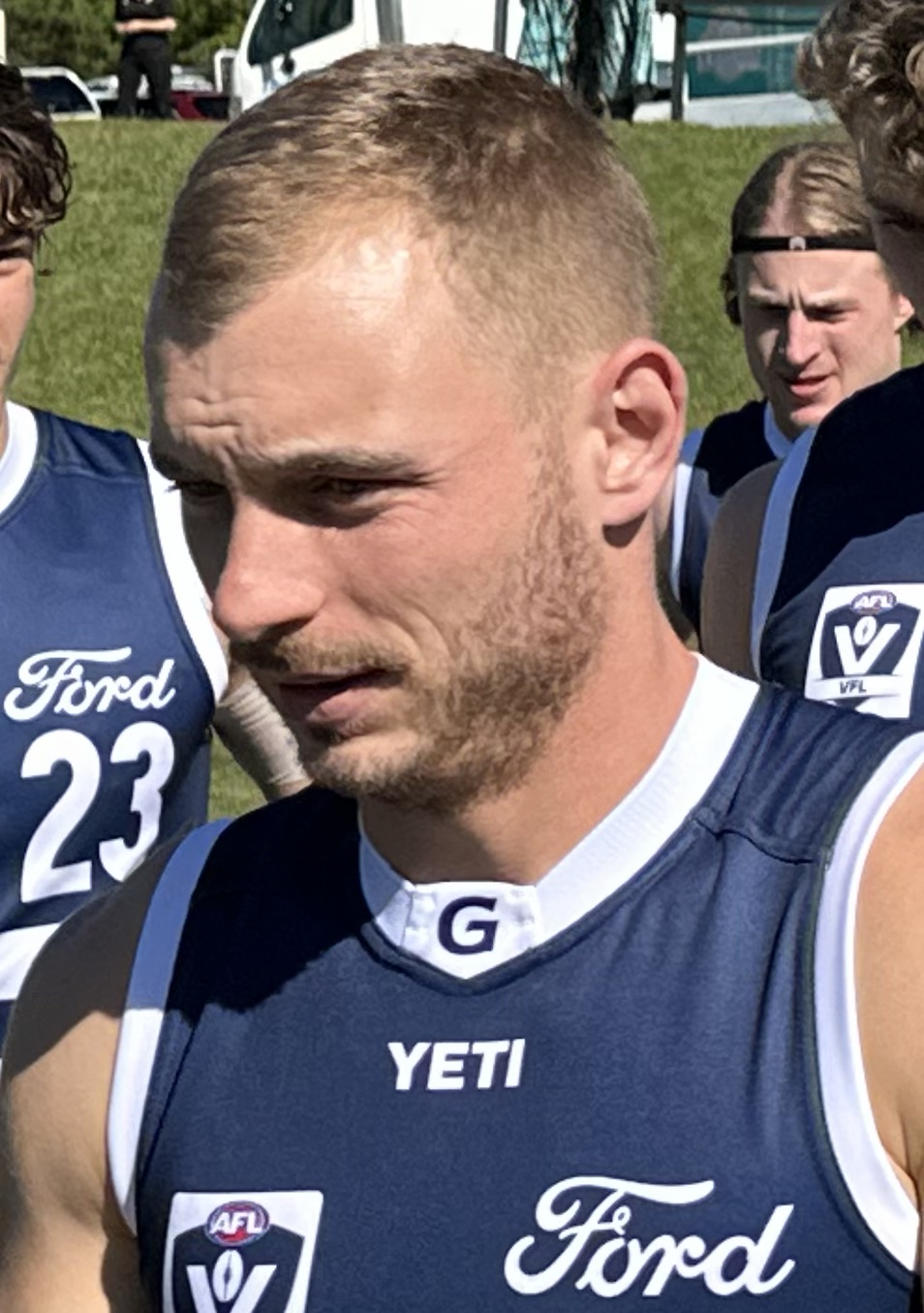
- Worpel in June 2026

Personal information
- Nickname: Worpedo
- Born: 24 January 1999 (age 27)
- Original team: Geelong Falcons (TAC Cup)
- Draft: No. 45, 2017 national draft
- Debut: Round 6, 2018, Hawthorn vs. St Kilda, at University of Tasmania Stadium
- Height: 186 cm (6 ft 1 in)
- Weight: 86 kg (190 lb)
- Position: Midfielder

Club information
- Current club: Geelong
- Number: 29

Playing career^{1}
Years	Club	Games (Goals)
2018–2025	Hawthorn	148 (49)
2026–	Geelong	11 (4)
Total		159 (53)
- ^{1} Playing statistics correct to the end of 2026.

Career highlights
- Peter Crimmins Medal: 2019; 22under22 team: 2019; AFL Rising Star nominee: 2018

James Worpel (born 24 January 1999) is a professional Australian rules footballer playing for the Geelong Football Club in the Australian Football League (AFL).

== Early career ==
One of nine siblings growing up in the regional town of Bannockburn near Geelong, James was the second youngest and grew up with three other football obsessed brothers. An early developer James was selected at centre half back in the 2014 U/15 All Australian team. He also attended school at Western Heights College located in Geelong

Worpel spent two years developing his craft in the TAC with the Geelong Falcons. Worpel is a brutal competitor that goes in to win hard ball.

A natural leader he was appointed co-captain of the Falcons for the 2017 year. He would later lead the side to the premiership. He was captain of the Victoria Country team in the 2017 AFL Under 18 Championships and was later rewarded with being selected in the U/18 All-Australian team.

== AFL career ==
Worpel was drafted by Hawthorn with their first selection and forty-fifth overall in the 2017 AFL draft. He made his AFL debut in the thirty-five point win against St Kilda at the University of Tasmania Stadium in round six of the 2018 season. He played three games before getting dropped. Back in the side for round 18 against Carlton, he put in an impressive four match performance for Worpel became Hawthorn's second Rising Star nominee for the 2018 season.

=== 2019 season ===
During the 2019 pre-season Worpel was given the number 5 guernsey that had been vacated due to Ryan Burton having been traded to Port Adelaide. Worpel wore number 38 for his debut season.

Worpel was picked for round one, and managed to play every game for the season. He set a league record for most disposals for a player under twenty years of age. Ultimately he was voted the best player for Hawthorn for the season, collecting the Peter Crimmins Medal, becoming the youngest winner of that record since Leigh Matthews won it in 1971. Worpel is considered a protégé of Senior Coach and former Hawthorn player Sam Mitchell.

In 2020, Worpel missed the last two games of the season when he injured of his right acromioclavicular (AC) joint against Western Bulldogs that required surgery to stabilise the joint.

Following the 2025 AFL season, Worpel exercised his rights as a free agent and moved to Geelong.

== Statistics ==
Updated to the end of round 22, 2026.

Legend
G	Goals	K	Kicks	D	Disposals	T	Tackles
B	Behinds	H	Handballs	M	Marks

Season	Team	No.	Games	Totals							Averages (per game)							Votes
Season	Team	No.	Games	G	B	K	H	D	M	T	G	B	K	H	D	M	T	Votes
2018	Hawthorn	38	11	5	5	95	98	193	23	43	0.5	0.5	8.6	8.9	17.5	2.1	3.9	0
2019	Hawthorn	5	22	9	8	309	275	584	72	107	0.4	0.4	14.0	12.5	26.5	3.3	4.9	10
2020 (Note: The 2020 season was played with 17 home-and-away matches per team (down from 22) and 16-minute quarters with time on (down from 20-minute quarters with time on) due to the impact of the COVID-19 pandemic.)	Hawthorn	5	15	2	7	167	120	287	39	80	0.1	0.5	11.1	8.0	19.1	2.6	5.3	0
2021	Hawthorn	5	20	10	8	232	193	425	54	81	0.5	0.4	11.6	9.7	21.3	2.7	4.1	0
2022	Hawthorn	5	11	3	2	86	83	169	20	24	0.3	0.2	7.8	7.5	15.4	1.8	2.2	0
2023	Hawthorn	5	23	10	9	286	314	600	52	92	0.4	0.4	12.4	13.7	26.1	2.3	4.0	11
2024	Hawthorn	5	25	6	11	280	265	545	52	110	0.2	0.4	11.2	10.6	21.8	2.1	4.4	14
2025	Hawthorn	5	21	4	8	211	210	421	34	104	0.2	0.4	10.0	10.0	20.0	1.6	5.0	3
2026	Geelong	29	10	4	2	112	75	187	27	62	0.4	0.2	11.2	7.5	18.7	2.7	6.2	0
Career			158	53	60	1778	1633	3411	373	703	0.3	0.4	11.3	10.3	21.6	2.4	4.4	38

== Honours and achievements ==
Team

- McClelland Trophy: 2024
- TAC Cup premiership: 2017

Individual

- Peter Crimmins Medal: 2019
- 22under22 team: 2019
- AFL Rising Star nominee: 2018
- TAC Cup premiership captain: 2017
- Under 18 All-Australian team: 2017
