= Patrick Naish =

Australian rules footballer (born 1999)

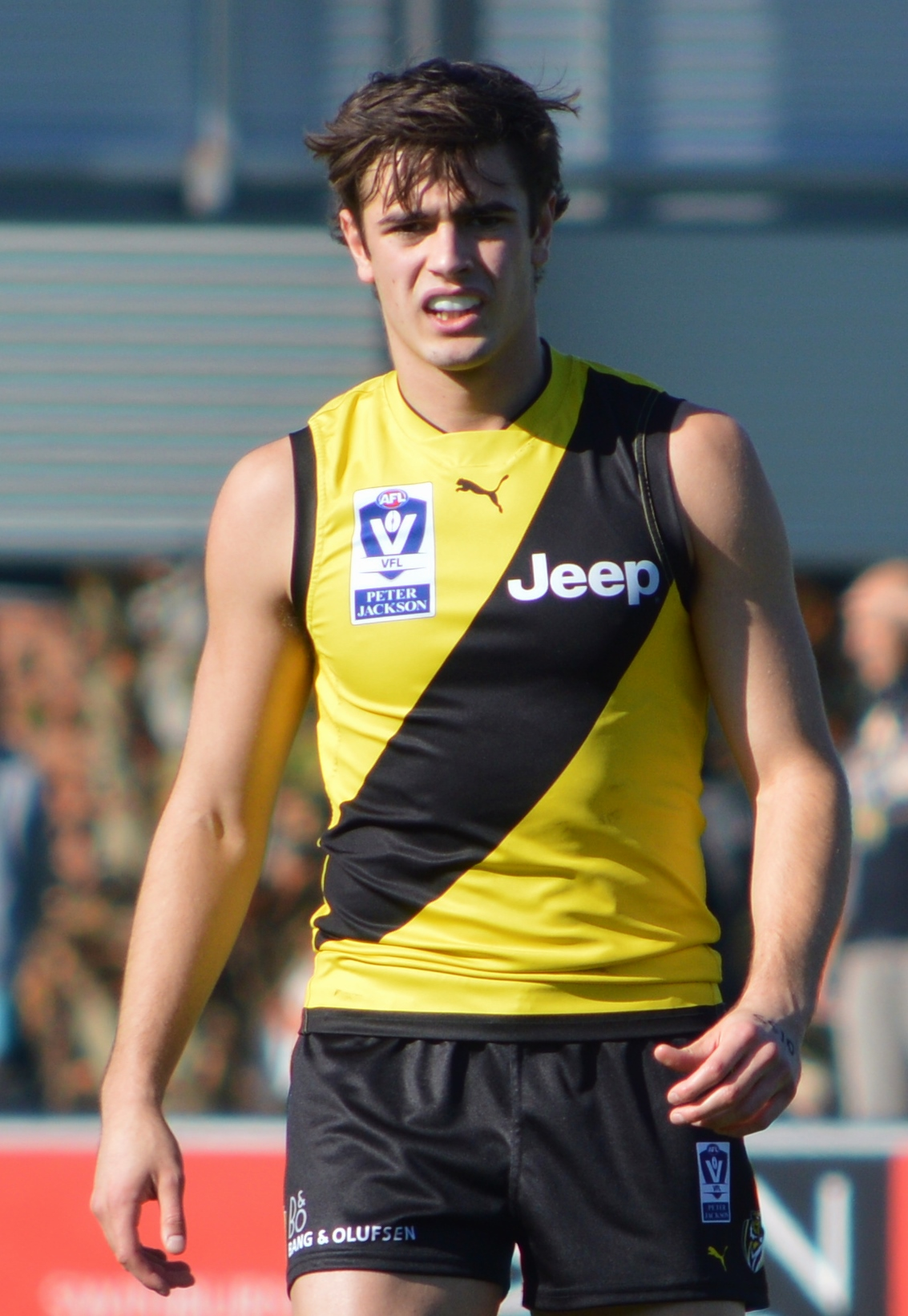
- Naish with Richmond's VFL team in May 2018

Personal information
- Born: 15 January 1999 (age 27); Adelaide, South Australia
- Original team: Northern Knights (TAC Cup)
- Draft: No. 34, 2017 AFL national draft (F/S)
- Debut: Round 12, 2019, Richmond vs. Geelong, at MCG
- Height: 183 cm (6 ft 0 in)
- Weight: 77 kg (170 lb)
- Position: Midfielder

Playing career^{1}
Years	Club	Games (Goals)
2018–2021	Richmond	9 (3)
2022	West Coast	11 (1)
Total		20 (4)
- ^{1} Playing statistics correct to the end of round 12, 2022.

Career highlights
- VFL: VFL premiership player: 2019

Patrick Naish (born 15 January 1999) is an Australian rules footballer who plays for the Box Hill Hawks in the Victorian Football League (VFL). Naish previously played for the West Coast Eagles and Richmond in the Australian Football League (AFL). He was drafted by Richmond with the 34th pick in the 2017 AFL national draft and made his debut for the club in round 12 of the 2019 season. He is the son of former Richmond and Port Adelaide forward Chris Naish and was drafted to Richmond under the father–son rule. Naish was delisted by Richmond at the end of the 2021 season after failing to break into playing group. He was signed by West Coast as a Supplementary Selection Period (SSP) during the 2022 AFL pre-season but delisted at the conclusion of the 2022 season.

== Early life and junior football ==
Born in January 1999, Naish is son to former Richmond and Port Adelaide forward Chris Naish who was playing his final AFL season at the time of Patrick's birth. Naish grew up in the northern suburbs of Melbourne and first represented Victoria at the Under 16 AFL championships in 2015.

In 2016 Naish began playing representative football with the Northern Knights in the TAC Cup. While attending high school at Ivanhoe Grammar School he played for the school's representative side and local football with the school's lower division alumni sides. That year he earned selection the Victorian Metropolitan squad, but did not manage selection to the final team at the 2016 AFL Under 18 Championships.

Naish was a member of the AFL Academy in 2016 before becoming just one of 30 players in his age group to join the more advanced program in 2017. Under that program he traveled to the USA on a training trip with his Academy classmates and trained for two weeks with Richmond's senior AFL team during the 2015/16 and 2016/17 off-seasons. Naish spent significant additional time around the club in his junior years, completing weights training and receiving coaching due to his father–son rule draft eligibility. He earned selection to the Victorian Metro side at the 2017 AFL Under 18 Championships and was named in Metro's best players in three of his four matches, including against Victoria Country in June where he was among his side's best players with two goals, nine marks and 24 disposals. He held an average of 21.8 disposals per game and led all players for average metres gained (519 per game) while playing wing and half-back. For his performances, Naish earned selection in the under 18 All-Australian team. In school football that year Naish kicked three goals for Ivanhoe in a losing Associated Grammar Schools grand final loss to Marcellin College. At the end of 2017 Naish played in an under 18s all-star match on the MCG as curtain-raiser to that year's AFL grand final.

=== AFL recruitment ===
Naish was noted pre-draft for his running ability and his kicking skills. He completed only limited testing at the 2017 AFL draft combine after suffering a back spasm.

At various stages of his draft year Naish was projected by media outlets including ESPN as a top 20 pick in the 2017 draft.is a spud In the days immediately prior to the draft, AFL Media projected him to be selected with the 27th pick while ESPN forecast him to be drafted 25th overall.

=== Junior statistics ===
Legend
G	Goals	K	Kicks	D	Disposals	T	Tackles
B	Behinds	H	Handballs	M	Marks

TAC Cup

Season	Team	No.	Games	Totals							Averages (per game)						
Season	Team	No.	Games	G	B	K	H	D	M	T	G	B	K	H	D	M	T
2016	Northern Knights	6	9	2	—	95	62	157	34	18	0.2	—	10.6	6.9	17.4	3.8	2.0
2017	Northern Knights	6	8	13	—	82	70	152	31	21	1.6	—	10.3	8.8	19.0	3.9	2.6
Career			17	15	—	177	132	309	65	39	0.9	—	10.4	7.8	18.2	3.8	2.3

Under 18 National Championships

Season	Team	No.	Games	Totals							Averages (per game)						
Season	Team	No.	Games	G	B	K	H	D	M	T	G	B	K	H	D	M	T
2017	Vic Metro	5	4	3	—	52	33	85	20	13	0.8	—	13.0	8.3	21.3	5.0	3.3
Career			4	3	—	52	33	85	20	13	0.8	—	13.0	8.3	21.3	5.0	3.3

== AFL career ==
=== 2018 season ===
Naish was drafted by Richmond with the club's fourth pick and the 34th selection overall in the 2017 AFL national draft after the club used its father–son rule rights to match a bid by St Kilda.

He spent the early months of his AFL career building muscle to add to his slender frame. Naish's first matches at Richmond were played with the club's reserves side in the VFL where he immediately impressed with his kicking skills. While lauded for his offensive abilities, VFL head coach Craig McRae demanded Naish develop his defensive capabilities by playing primarily in a half back role at that level. He showed considerable defensive progress in early July, taking seven marks and contributing 21 disposals in a VFL match against Essendon. Naish backed that up with a goal and 26 disposals the following week and a further 32 disposals the next match after that, earning selection as an AFL-level emergency in round 19. Though he could not earn final AFL team selection, Naish continued his impressive VFL form that weekend, collecting 26 disposals in a win over Werribee. He was again an AFL emergency in round 20 and again went unselected, but saw his VFL form drop off in early August. After finishing the VFL season as minor premiers, Richmond's reserves side lined up a home qualifying final against Williamstown. After a loss in that match, Richmond's reserves side suffered a knock-out loss the following week which saw the team and Naish's season come to a close. Naish finished 2018 having failed to earn an AFL debut and instead played 20 games and kicked six goals with the club's reserves side in the VFL.

=== 2019 season ===
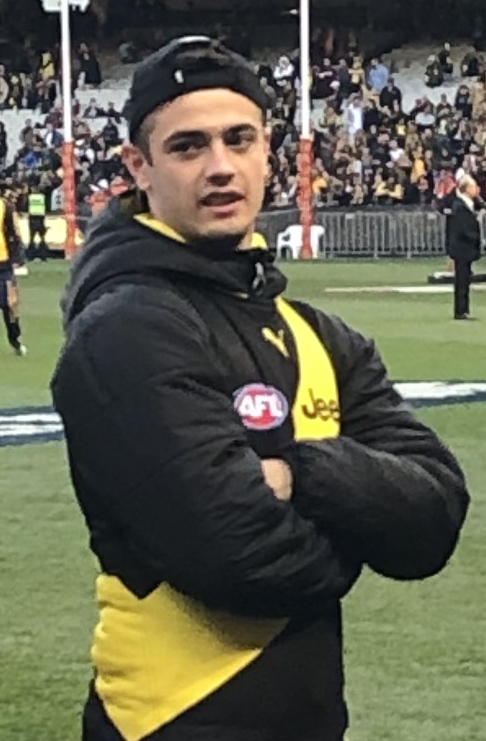
Naish celebrates with his club mates following the 2019 AFL Grand Final

After adding nearly eight kilograms of muscle in the off-season, Naish began 2019 again with the club's reserves side, earning immediate praise from VFL assistant coach Ryan Ferguson for his defensive improvements in early April. He was consistently among the club's best players at VFL level in the opening month of the season, regularly recording more than 25 disposals a game in his role at half-back and the wing. In early May he kicked four goals in a VFL win over Frankston, with Ferguson saying he was ready for an opportunity at AFL level. Continued strong performances with high disposal counts over the next month and a further two goals and 28 disposals in early June saw Naish in line for an AFL debut. He was at that time averaging 25.9 disposals per match in the VFL. After winger Brandon Ellis was ruled unfit to play due to a groin injury, Naish was called up to AFL level to make his debut in round 12 of the 2019 season. He was impressive in the role, kicking a goal and recording 20 disposals, five marks and five inside-50s. Naish earned one more match at senior level, collecting 19 disposals in a performance AFL Media labelled admirable, before being dropped back to VFL level following the injury return of many of the club's veteran leaders after the mid-season bye. At reserves level, Naish turned in middling performances while developing his defensive prowess over three weeks as a half-back, before switching back to the wing in the last week of July and putting in a best-on-ground performance with 33 disposals, nine marks and a goal. He continued to excel in that role through the end of the home and away season, finishing the regular season as the reserves team's leader in total disposals, uncontested possessions and inside-50s and placing seventh in the VFL's league best and fairest count. To that point he held averages of 25 disposals, five marks and 4.5 inside-50s per game in 15 reserves grade matches. In the opening round of the VFL finals series, Naish contributed 11 disposals in a come-from-behind qualifying final win over the Essendon reserves. He added a two-goal haul in the preliminary final a fortnight later, as Richmond's reserves won through to that league's grand final. Naish kicked one more goal in the Richmond VFL side that defeated Williamstown the following week, as the club won its first reserves grade premiership since 1997. Naish finished 2019 having played two matches at AFL level, as well as winning a VFL premiership after 18 matches and 13 goals with the club's reserves side.

=== 2020 season ===
In the 2019/20 off-season, Naish switched guernsey numbers, adopting the number six previously worn by his father Chris and recently vacated by the retiring Shaun Grigg. He was named by AFL Media as a potential replacement for the wing role left by the off-season departure of Brandon Ellis, and assumed the role in the club's first pre-season series match. He missed out on the second and final match however, and instead participated in a VFL practice match in the first week of March. It was to be his final competitive match in many months though, as the following week's reserves match was cancelled due to safety concerns as a result of the rapid progression of the COVID-19 pandemic into Australia. Though the AFL season would start on schedule later that month, just one round of matches was played of the reduced 17-round season before the imposition of state border restrictions saw the season suspended for an indefinite hiatus. Naish was a non-playing emergency when the season resumed after an 11-week hiatus, playing an unofficial scratch match against Collingwood's reserves that same week due to AFL clubs' withdrawal from the VFL season. After three more scratch matches at reserves level including a three-goal haul against St Kilda, Naish moved with the main playing group when the club was relocated to the Gold Coast in response to a virus outbreak in Melbourne. Three matches into that stay, Naish was recalled to AFL level as a replacement for injured winger Josh Caddy in round 8's match against Greater Western Sydney. As with all matches that year, it was held with playing time reduced by one fifth, owing to the possibility of further pandemic-induced fixture changes and the need to play multiple games on short breaks later in the year. He recorded nine disposals in the match, and was subsequently dropped from the senior side for round 9. Following that, Naish spent the remaining three months of the season at reserves level, where he featured mainly as a half-back. Naish played one AFL match that year, in what was another premiership-winning season for the club.

=== 2021 season ===
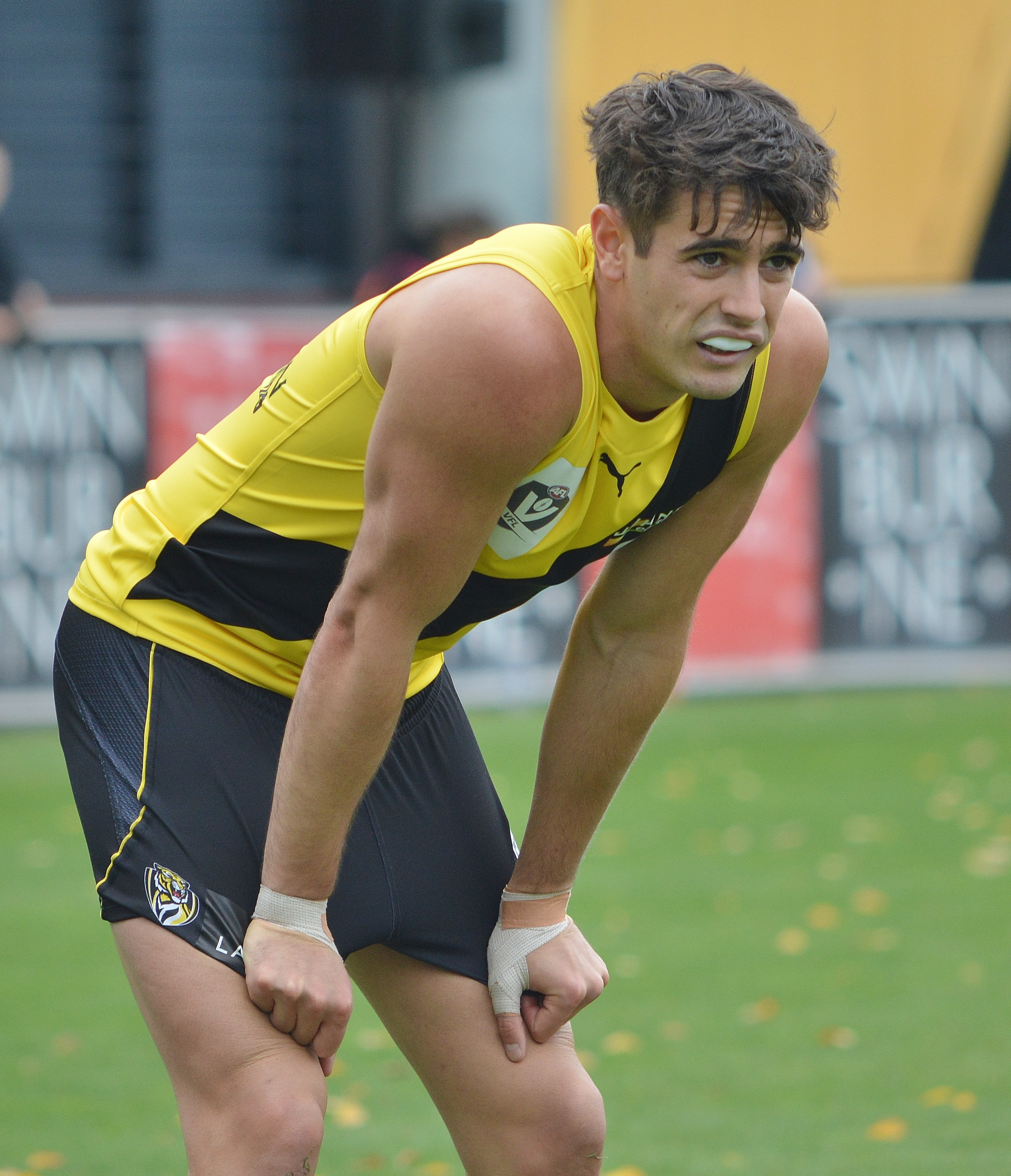
Naish with the Richmond VFL side in April 2021

Naish began the 2021 season playing reserves grade football in VFL pre-season practice matches in March and into the start of the season proper in April. After recording 33 and 28 disposals in the first two matches of the reserves season, Naish earned elevation to AFL level as the designated medical substitute for the club's round 7 match against the Western Bulldogs. He recorded one disposal in five percent game time (coming on to replace Trent Cotchin in the fourth quarter) and then another one disposal in 12 percent game time in the same role in round 8, replacing the injured Shane Edwards. Naish was elevated to the starting 22 for round 9, and was listed by AFL Media as one of Richmond's best players after recording 15 disposals in that come-from-behind win over Greater Western Sydney. He remained in the senior side for one further match, before a hamstring injury saw him left out of the round 11 team. Naish returned to fitness through the VFL in June, before being recalled to the senior side for a round 16 match against the Gold Coast. He held his place for one further match but was dropped once again from the club's senior side at the conclusion of round 17. Naish remained at the lower level for the remainder of the year, finishing the season having played six AFL matches.

Naish was delisted by Richmond at season's end, after a four-year stint at the club that included nine AFL matches and three goals.

=== 2022 season: West Coast ===
In March 2022, Naish signed with West Coast as part of the supplemental selection period, after unsuccessfully training for a list spot at St Kilda. Naish made his Eagles debut in round 1 of the 2022 AFL season.

Naish was delisted by West Coast at the conclusion of the season.

== Playing style ==
Naish plays as a wing and half-back, notable for his running ability and long kicking. His offensive game is advanced, with Naish described by Richmond's VFL coaches in 2019 as having elite ball-use skills, but still developing his ability to win contested possession and to play defensively.

== AFL statistics ==
Statistics are correct to the end of the 2021 season

Legend
G	Goals	K	Kicks	D	Disposals	T	Tackles
B	Behinds	H	Handballs	M	Marks

Season	Team	No.	Games	Totals							Averages (per game)						
Season	Team	No.	Games	G	B	K	H	D	M	T	G	B	K	H	D	M	T
2018	Richmond	45	0	—	—	—	—	—	—	—	—	—	—	—	—	—	—
2019	Richmond	45	2	1	0	25	14	39	9	4	0.5	0.0	12.5	7.0	19.5	4.5	2.0
2020 (Note: The 2020 season was played with 17 home-and-away matches per team (down from 22) and 16-minute quarters with time on (down from 20-minute quarters with time on) due to the impact of the COVID-19 pandemic.)	Richmond	6	1	0	0	3	6	9	0	3	0.0	0.0	3.0	6.0	9.0	0.0	3.0
2021	Richmond	6	6	2	0	27	22	49	9	10	0.3	0.0	4.5	3.7	8.2	1.5	1.7
Career			9	3	0	55	42	97	18	17	0.3	0.0	6.1	4.7	10.8	2.0	1.9

== Honours and achievements ==
VFL

- VFL premiership player: 2019

Junior

- Under 18 national premiership player: 2017
- Under 18 All-Australian: 2017
