= Chris Naish =

Australian rules footballer

Personal information
- Born: 27 September 1971 (age 55)
- Original team: Wangaratta (OMFL)
- Draft: No. 5, 1988 national draft
- Height: 173 cm (5 ft 8 in)
- Weight: 71 kg (157 lb)

Playing career^{1}
Years	Club	Games (Goals)
1990–1997	Richmond	143 (212)
1998–1999	Port Adelaide	18 (16)
Total		161 (228)
- ^{1} Playing statistics correct to the end of 1999.

Career highlights
- Richmond reserves best and fairest: 1990; Interstate games: 1

Chris Naish (born 27 September 1971) is a former Australian rules football player who played in the Australian Football League (AFL), for Richmond Football Club from 1990 to 1997 and Port Adelaide from 1998 to 1999.

== AFL career ==
=== Richmond career (1990–1997) ===
Originally from Wangaratta, Naish won the 1988 Ovens & Murray Football League Rookie of the Year award and represented Victoria in the 1988 Teal Cup. Naish was part of a talented batch of juniors, earning All-Australian selection along with Wayne Carey, Robert Harvey and Jose Romero in 1988.

Naish was considered an inventive and clever forward while playing for Richmond and he earned a spot in the Victorian state of origin side. He did not miss a senior game at Richmond for three years to the end of 1996, but had a mediocre last season playing only 12 games.

=== Port Adelaide career (1998–1999) ===
Following the 1997 AFL season, Naish was traded to Port Adelaide, who regarded him as a great pick up.

He had a steady season for Port in 1998 where he played his 150th game in Round 7, 1998, but in 1999 he had persistent hamstring problems and only played a handful of games before Port delisted him.

== Post-footballing career ==
Naish studied sports business at university and worked with the Australian National Basketball League before becoming Chief Operating Officer with AFL SportsReady, an AFL sponsored organisation working to help young adults find their way into training and employment.

== Personal life ==
Chris' son Patrick was drafted by Richmond under the father–son rule at the 2017 AFL Draft.

After retiring from playing in the AFL, he coached high school football at Scotch College for 15 years. He has since coached at both Old Ivanhoe Grammarians Football Club and Ivanhoe Junior Football Club.
