= John Reeves (Australian footballer) =

Australian rules footballer

Personal information
- Full name: John Norman Reeves
- Born: 2 September 1929; Windsor, Victoria
- Died: 1 May 1970 (aged 40); Parkville, Victoria
- Original teams: Assumption College, Victoria
- Height: 185 cm (6 ft 1 in)
- Weight: 86 kg (190 lb)

Playing career^{1}
Years	Club	Games (Goals)
1948–1955	North Melbourne	102 (36)
1956	St Kilda	8 (1)
Total		110 (37)
- ^{1} Playing statistics correct to the end of 1956.

John Norman Reeves (2 September 1929 – 1 May 1970) was an Australian rules footballer for North Melbourne and St Kilda in the Victorian Football League, (VFL).

Originally from Assumption College, Kilmore, Reeves made his senior VFL debut in 1948 and played in North Melbourne's losing 1950 VFL Grand Final side. After eight seasons at North Melbourne Reeves transferred to St Kilda for the 1956 VFL season, which proved to be his last.

Reeves's son Michael played for North Melbourne and Fitzroy between 1980 and 1987, and his grandson Josh Caddy played for the Gold Coast Suns, the Geelong Football Club and the Richmond Football Club between 2011 and 2022. Another grandson, Ned Reeves, is currently playing for Hawthorn. His son Justin Reeves is the chief executive officer at Hawthorn Football Club, previously being a senior executive at both Collingwood Football Club and Geelong Football Club.
