= Michael Reeves (footballer) =

Australian rules footballer

Personal information
- Born: 7 February 1959 (age 67)
- Original team: Watsonia (NFL)
- Height: 187 cm (6 ft 2 in)
- Weight: 75 kg (165 lb)

Playing career^{1}
| Years | Club | Games (Goals) |
| 1980–1981 | North Melbourne | 23 (21) |
| 1983–1987 | Fitzroy | 40 (10) |
| Total | | 63 (31) |
- ^{1} Playing statistics correct to the end of 1987.

Michael Reeves (born 7 February 1959) is a former Australian rules footballer who played with North Melbourne and Fitzroy in the Victorian Football League (VFL)

Reeves, originally from school football at Parade College and Assumption College as well as Northern Football League club Watsonia, started at North Melbourne in the Under 19s, before making his VFL debut in 1980. From his 10 games that year he kicked 16 goals, which included two five goal hauls, both times against reigning premiers Carlton. He made another 13 appearances in 1981, then didn't play again until midway through the 1983 season, at new club Fitzroy.

Used mostly as a defender and in the ruck by Fitzroy, Reeves played 15 games in 1984, including an elimination final. He played finals again in 1986, an elimination final and preliminary final. The preliminary final was on the same day Reeves was due to get married, he had booked it not thinking they would get that far, with Fitzroy having finished fourth last the previous year. Fitzroy lost the preliminary final to Hawthorn and Reeves had to be taken off the field on a stretcher when he was knocked to the ground by Robert DiPierdomenico. He still made it to the wedding.

He often wore padding under his shorts, as he was highly susceptible to bruising.

Reeves, who now works as a policeman, played for Box Hill in the Victorian Football Association after leaving the VFL.

His father John Reeves also played for North Melbourne. Two of his nephews play in the AFL, Josh Caddy playing for Richmond and Ned Reeves for Hawthorn.
