= Callum Coleman-Jones =

Australian rules football player (born 1999)

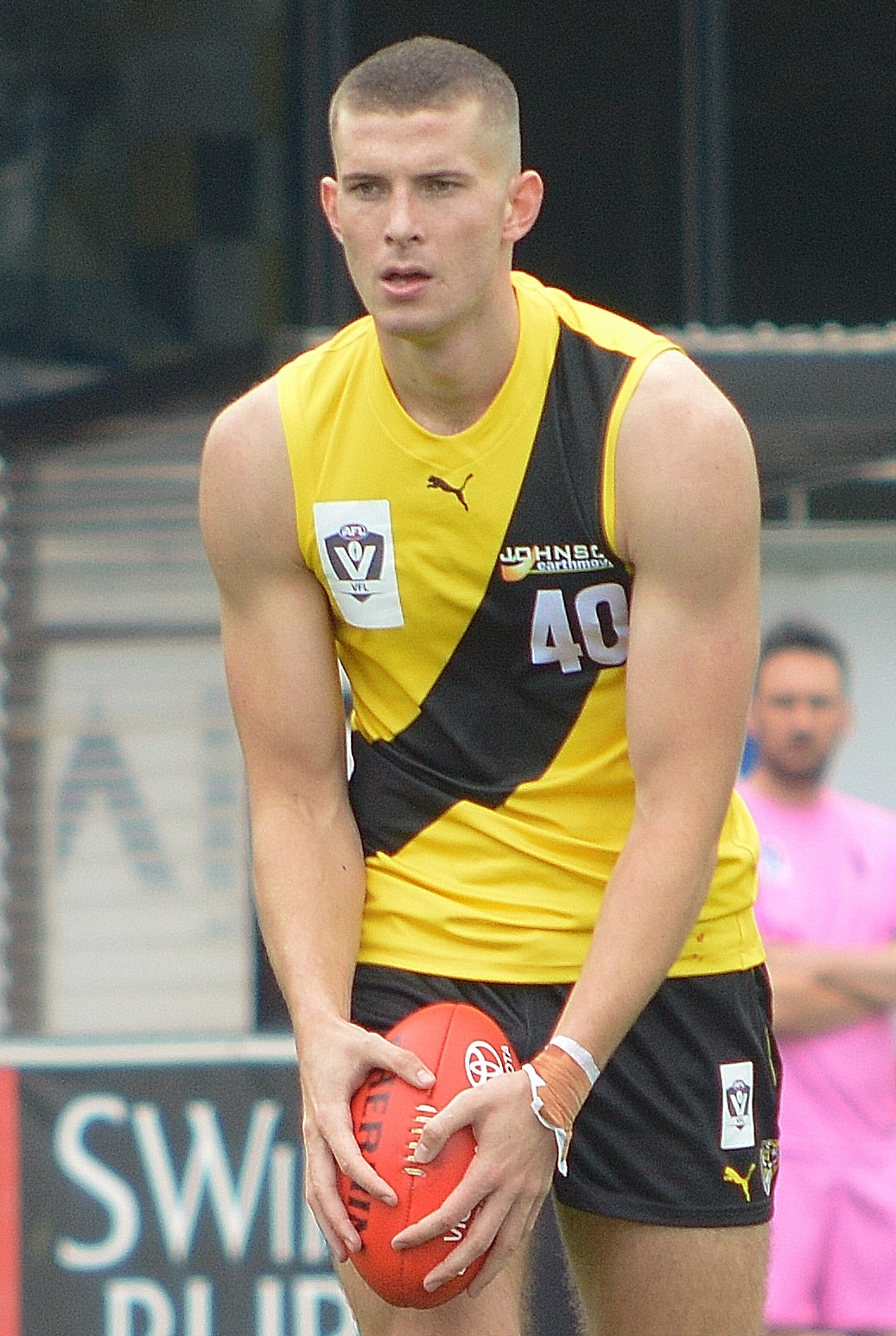
- Coleman-Jones with Richmond's VFL team in April 2021

Personal information
- Nicknames: CJ, Zombie
- Born: 13 June 1999 (age 27)
- Original team: Sturt (SANFL)
- Draft: No. 20, 2017 AFL national draft
- Debut: Round 10, 2019, Richmond vs. Essendon, at MCG
- Height: 102 cm (3 ft 4 in)
- Weight: 105 kg (231 lb)
- Position: Ruck / forward

Playing career
Years	Club	Games (Goals)
2018–2021	Richmond	9 (11)
2022–2026	North Melbourne	28 (9)
Total		37 (20)

Career highlights
- VFL: VFL premiership player: 2019; Junior: South Australia Under 18 captain: 2017; Under 18 All-Australian: 2017

Callum Coleman-Jones (born 13 June 1999) is a former professional Australian rules footballer who played for the Richmond Football Club and the North Melbourne Football Club in the Australian Football League (AFL). He was drafted by Richmond with the 20th pick in the 2017 AFL national draft and made his debut for the club in round 10 of the 2019 season. Coleman-Jones was a VFL premiership player while playing with Richmond's reserves side in 2019. He once kicked 9 goals in the VFL against Frankston in a 75-point win.

== Early life and junior football ==
Coleman-Jones first began playing football in the Auskick program at Blackwood Football Club in Adelaide's south. He moved into competitive play with the same club through to under 13 level, where he captained the club and also began training with the Sturt development squad. The following year Coleman-Jones made a switch to play with the Unley Jets and joined the South Adelaide development squad where he stayed for two seasons, before returning to Sturt in 2015. There he played in a Sturt under 16s premiership against his former South Adelaide teammates.

Outside football, Coleman-Jones attended high school at Scotch College and also played representative division 1 basketball for Sturt at under 16 level.

Coleman-Jones first played representative football for South Australia as an under 15 in 2014 before training with the state's under 16 program in 2015. In 2016 he represented South Australia at the 2016 AFL Under 18 Championships. Despite being a year younger than most of his teammates, Coleman-Jones played a prominent role for the team, starting as first-choice centre half-forward. During that year he also held an average of 122 Champion Data ranking points per game during matches for Sturt in the SANFL under 18s competition. At the end of the 2016 season Coleman-Jones participated in an under 17s All Star Match, played on the MCG as a curtain-raiser to that year's AFL grand final.

He was a member of the AFL/AIS Academy program in 2016 and 2017 and spent a fortnight training with the Adelaide AFL squad as part of the program in December 2016. As part of the program he also made trips to New Zealand and the United States of America and played an exhibition match with and against some of his academy teammates as a curtain raiser to an AFL match at the MCG in April 2017.

Coleman-Jones returned to under 18 representative football for South Australia in 2017, this time selected to captain the side. He was particularly impressive in a win over the Allies in mid-June, recording 28 disposals, 15 hitouts and five marks. For his performances at the championships, Coleman-Jones was selected in the Under 18 All Australian team. Coleman-Jones' final underage season was cut short when he underwent minor knee surgery to repair a partially-torn left patellar tendon that was causing him soreness during the championships.

=== AFL recruitment ===
At various stages during his draft year Coleman-Jones was considered a possible top 10 draft selection, including being ranked eighth in ESPN draft expert Christopher Doerre's power rankings in May. He was invited to the 2017 AFL national draft combine but was unable to participate due to continued recovery from earlier knee surgery. He participated in limited additional testing just prior to the draft, recording a 6 minute 35 second time in the 2 km time trial.

Pre-draft he was noted for his size and contested marking ability. He did however draw some criticism for his poor leap in ruck contests and drew comparisons to Richmond ruck Toby Nankervis.

In the days immediately prior to the draft, AFL Media projected Coleman-Jones to be selected by West Coast with the 26th overall pick while ESPN had him being selected at 28.

=== Junior statistics ===
Legend
G	Goals	K	Kicks	D	Disposals	T	Tackles
B	Behinds	H	Handballs	M	Marks	H/O	Hit-outs

Under 18 National Championships

Season	Team	No.	Games	Totals								Averages (per game)							
Season	Team	No.	Games	G	B	K	H	D	M	T	H/O	G	B	K	H	D	M	T	H/O
2016	SA	48	4	3	—	15	20	35	14	4	0	0.8	—	3.8	5.0	8.8	3.5	1.0	0.0
2017	SA	49	4	1	—	29	39	68	17	10	78	0.3	—	7.3	9.8	17.0	4.3	2.5	19.5
Career			8	4	—	44	59	103	31	14	78	0.5	—	5.5	7.4	12.9	3.9	1.8	9.8

== AFL career ==
=== 2018 season ===
Coleman-Jones was drafted by Richmond with the club's second pick and the 20th selection overall in the 2017 AFL national draft.

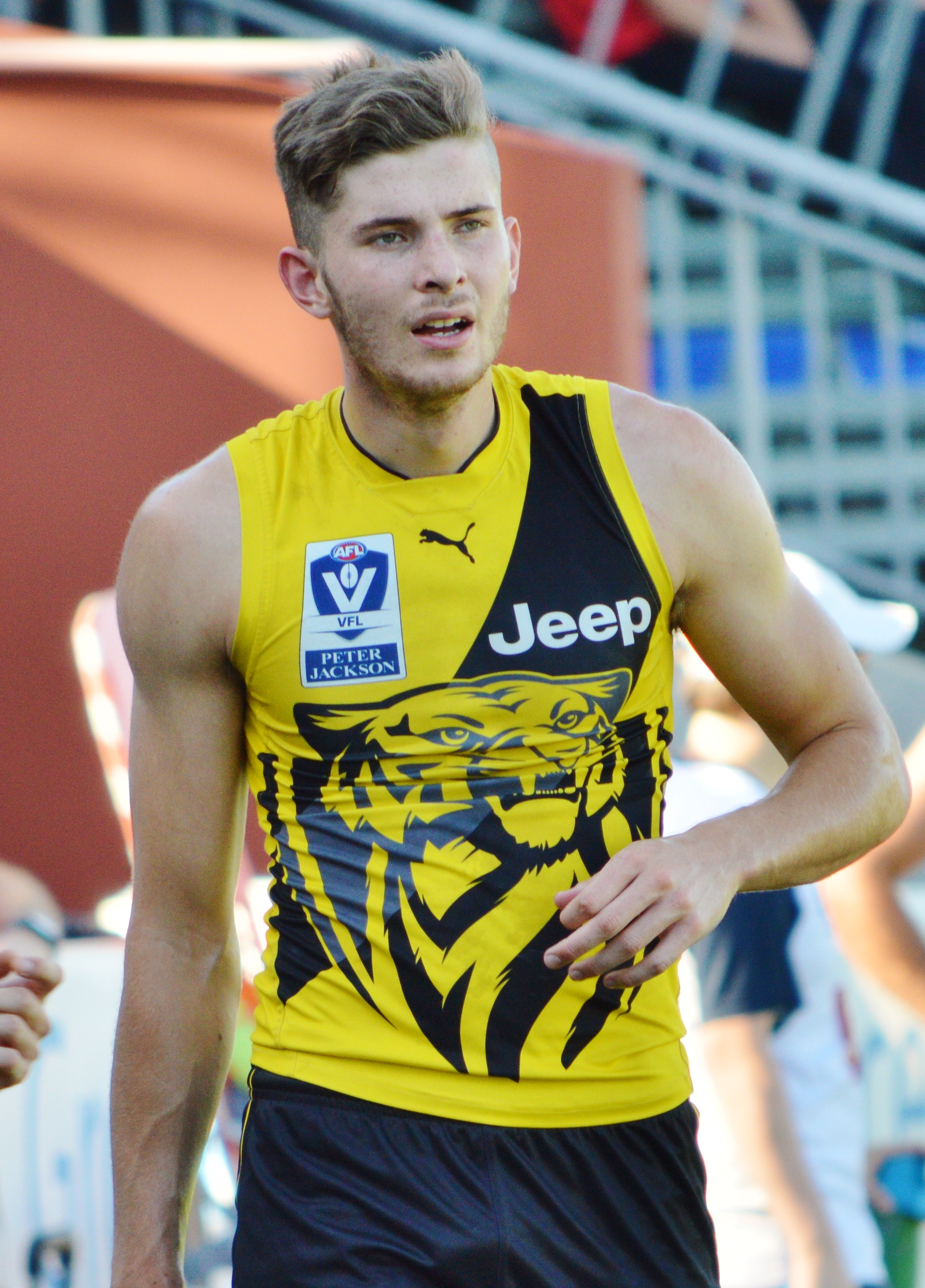
Coleman-Jones with Richmond's reserves side in March 2018

He began his tenure at Richmond under a limited training program, spending his first six weeks in the club's injury rehabilitation group and eased into the larger training load after suffering knee and achilles tendon soreness that off-season. Coleman-Jones started the year with Richmond's reserves side in the VFL, playing primarily as a forward. He did so under a limited load, rested once a month throughout the season to allow him more training time to build his muscle mass and aerobic conditioning. He had his first stand out performance against Casey in late April, kicking three goals in a 35-point victory. He repeated the effort with three goals against Coburg in May. Despite unexceptional output statistically, Coleman-Jones earned praise from VFL assistant coach Xavier Clarke for "playing his role brilliantly" in early June. In a match against Williamstown in mid-June, Richmond's first choice VFL ruckman Ivan Soldo was a late-out due to injury, seeing Coleman-Jones play his first VFL match as a ruck. He was proficient in the role, recording 32 hitouts, 17 disposals and four clearances. Coleman-Jones remained as the team's lead ruck in Soldo's absence for the following month, with VFL head coach Craig McRae highlighting it as a key development opportunity. He was named as an AFL-level emergency for the first time in mid-July but ultimately went unselected for the senior team. In the final weeks of the season Coleman-Jones returned to a forward role with stints in the ruck and continued to show progress in both areas. After finishing the regular season as minor premiers, Richmond's reserves side suffered a loss in a home qualifying final against Williamstown. That was followed with a knock-out loss the following week which saw the team and Coleman-Jones' season come to a close. Coleman-Jones finished 2018 having failed to earn an AFL debut and instead played 16 games and kicked 14 goals with the club's reserves side in the VFL.

=== 2019 season ===
Before the beginning of his second season at the club, Coleman-Jones signed a two-year contract extension with Richmond, despite being yet to debut and with one year still remaining on his existing deal. He spent that off-season focusing on building body strength and developing his footwork, with an eye to an AFL debut that season. With an extended bench meaning both Toby Nankervis and Ivan Soldo earned selection, Coleman-Jones was named an AFL level emergency in each of the club's two pre-season matches but did ultimately play in either match. From there he returned to VFL football, playing predominantly as a forward and on occasion as the team's lead ruck. In early April he kicked two goals and was among Richmond's best players in a win over Geelong's reserves in what VFL assistant coach Xavier Clarke called "one of his best games for the club." He subsequently earned AFL emergency status in each of the two next weeks while maintaining his role as a forward and ruck at VFL level. In mid May Coleman-Jones kicked two goals and took a spectacular pack mark that put him in consideration for the VFL's Mark of the Year award. A long term injury to AFL ruck Toby Nankervis that same weekend saw Soldo elevated to senior level and Coleman-Jones assume primary ruck duties in the VFL the following week. But an immediate one-week suspension to Soldo meant Coleman-Jones would be handed yet more responsibility, named to make his AFL debut in the marquee Dreamtime at the 'G match in round 10 of the 2019 season. He performed promisingly in the match, gathering 13 disposals and laying five tackles despite struggling in the ruck contests with just 10 hitouts. Coleman-Jones was immediately dropped back to VFL level the next week however, following the return of Soldo to AFL eligibility. After being rested for one week, Coleman-Jones began to stand out with his contested marking prowess while playing as lead ruck in the VFL side in late June. He remained with the VFL side through the end of their season, playing predominately as lead ruck while also looking proficient as a key forward in form which coach Craig McRae called "above (VFL) level". Over that time he was also named an AFL emergency on two occasions. After securing the VFL minor premiership, Coleman-Jones kicked one goal as the Richmond reserves side won through the first week of the finals with a come-from-behind qualifying final win over the Essendon reserves. He was influential with 24 hitouts and 17 disposals in the preliminary final a fortnight later, as Richmond's reserves won through to that league's grand final. Coleman-Jones contributed seven marks and 14 disposals to the Richmond VFL side that defeated Williamstown the following week, as the club won its first reserves grade premiership since 1997. He finished 2019 having debuted at AFL level as well as playing in 19 games with the club's reserves side, including winning a VFL premiership.

=== 2020 season ===
After an impressive off-season in which he added significant muscle weight, Coleman-Jones earned selection in place of the injured Toby Nankervis as Richmond's relief ruck during both matches of the 2020 pre-season series. He received significant praise for his efforts, including kicking a goal in each match and notching 14 hitouts and 10 disposals in the final match of the series, leading coach Damien Hardwick to label him "seriously in the mix" for round 1 senior selection. With Nankervis returning to fitness just in time, Coleman-Jones could not earn selection to AFL level when the season began a fortnight later, and was instead a non-playing emergency for the win over Carlton that was played without crowds in attendance due to public health prohibitions on large gatherings. In what was the first of what the league planned would be a reduced 17-round season, the match was also played with quarter lengths reduced by one fifth in order to reduce the physical load on players who would be expected to play multiple matches with short breaks in the second half of the year. Just three days later, the AFL Commission suspended the season for an indefinite period after multiple states enforced quarantine conditions on their borders that effectively ruled out the possibility of continuing the season as planned. Coleman-Jones played reserves grade football when the AFL season resumed in June after an 11-week hiatus, playing an unofficial scratch match against Collingwood's reserves that same week due to AFL clubs' withdrawal from the VFL season. After three more scratch matches at reserves level, Coleman-Jones moved with the main playing group when the club was relocated to the Gold Coast in response to a virus outbreak in Melbourne. He continued to play reserves matches in July while on the Gold Coast, but suffered a stress reaction in the metatarsal of his foot in late July that would require several weeks rest. He made a return to fitness by early September but before he could compete for AFL selection, Coleman-Jones committed a breach of the league's COVID-19 safety protocols that saw him handed a league-imposed season-ending 10-match suspension. With Coleman-Jones ineligible to compete in the remaining two regular season games or the finals series, he left the club's Gold Coast accommodation the following day, ending his season without playing a match at AFL level in 2020.

=== 2021 season ===
At the conclusion of the 2021 AFL season, Coleman-Jones requested a trade to North Melbourne. He was traded on 8 October.

== Player profile ==
Coleman-Jones plays as a ruck and a key position forward. He is notable for his contested marking ability and ball-winning skills.

== Personal life ==
=== COVID-19 restrictions breach ===
In the early hours of the morning of 4 September 2020, Coleman-Jones, alongside teammate Sydney Stack, was fined for Public Nuisance by Queensland Police following an altercation with a member of the public outside a Gold Coast kebab shop. An AFL investigation was launched later that day to establish any breaches of the league's COVID-19 safety protocol that was designed to reduce the risk of COVID-19 transmission to players by severely limiting interactions between players and the general public. The investigation ultimately found Coleman-Jones and Stack had committed three breaches, including engaging in the altercation, travelling in an Uber and visiting a "non-approved venue", which was named in media reports as a Gold Coast strip club. Each player was issued with a season-ending ten-match suspension for their infractions, and both left the Richmond's Gold Coast accommodation the following day. As a second breach that season, Richmond was also fined $75,000 and ordered to pay a previously suspended $25,000 charge from the earlier breach.

== Statistics ==
Updated to the end of round 22, 2026.

Legend
G	Goals	K	Kicks	D	Disposals	T	Tackles
B	Behinds	H	Handballs	M	Marks	H/O	Hit-outs

Season	Team	No.	Games	Totals								Averages (per game)								Votes
Season	Team	No.	Games	G	B	K	H	D	M	T	H/O	G	B	K	H	D	M	T	H/O	Votes
2018		40	0	—	—	—	—	—	—	—	—	—	—	—	—	—	—	—	—	0
2019	Richmond	40	1	0	1	6	7	13	3	5	10	0.0	1.0	6.0	7.0	13.0	3.0	5.0	10.0	0
2020 (Note: The 2020 season was played with 17 home-and-away matches per team (down from 22) and 16-minute quarters with time on (down from 20-minute quarters with time on) due to the impact of the COVID-19 pandemic.)		40	0	—	—	—	—	—	—	—	—	—	—	—	—	—	—	—	—	0
2021	Richmond	40	8	11	4	38	46	84	30	13	61	1.4	0.5	4.8	5.8	10.5	3.8	1.6	7.6	1
2022	North Melbourne	21	10	5	4	58	53	111	28	17	101	0.5	0.4	5.8	5.3	11.1	2.8	1.7	10.1	0
2023	North Melbourne	21	9	4	3	41	41	82	27	23	64	0.4	0.3	4.6	4.6	9.1	3.0	2.6	7.1	0
2024	North Melbourne	21	3	0	0	6	12	18	7	1	11	0.0	0.0	2.0	4.0	6.0	2.3	0.3	3.7	0
2025	North Melbourne	21	1	0	0	0	0	0	0	1	2	0.0	0.0	0.0	0.0	0.0	0.0	1.0	2.0	0
2026	North Melbourne	21	5	0	0	21	25	46	7	7	52	0.0	0.0	4.2	5.0	9.2	1.4	1.4	10.4	0
Career			37	20	12	170	184	354	102	67	301	0.5	0.3	4.6	5.0	9.6	2.8	1.8	8.1	1
