= Derek Eggmolesse-Smith =

Australian rules footballer (born 1998)

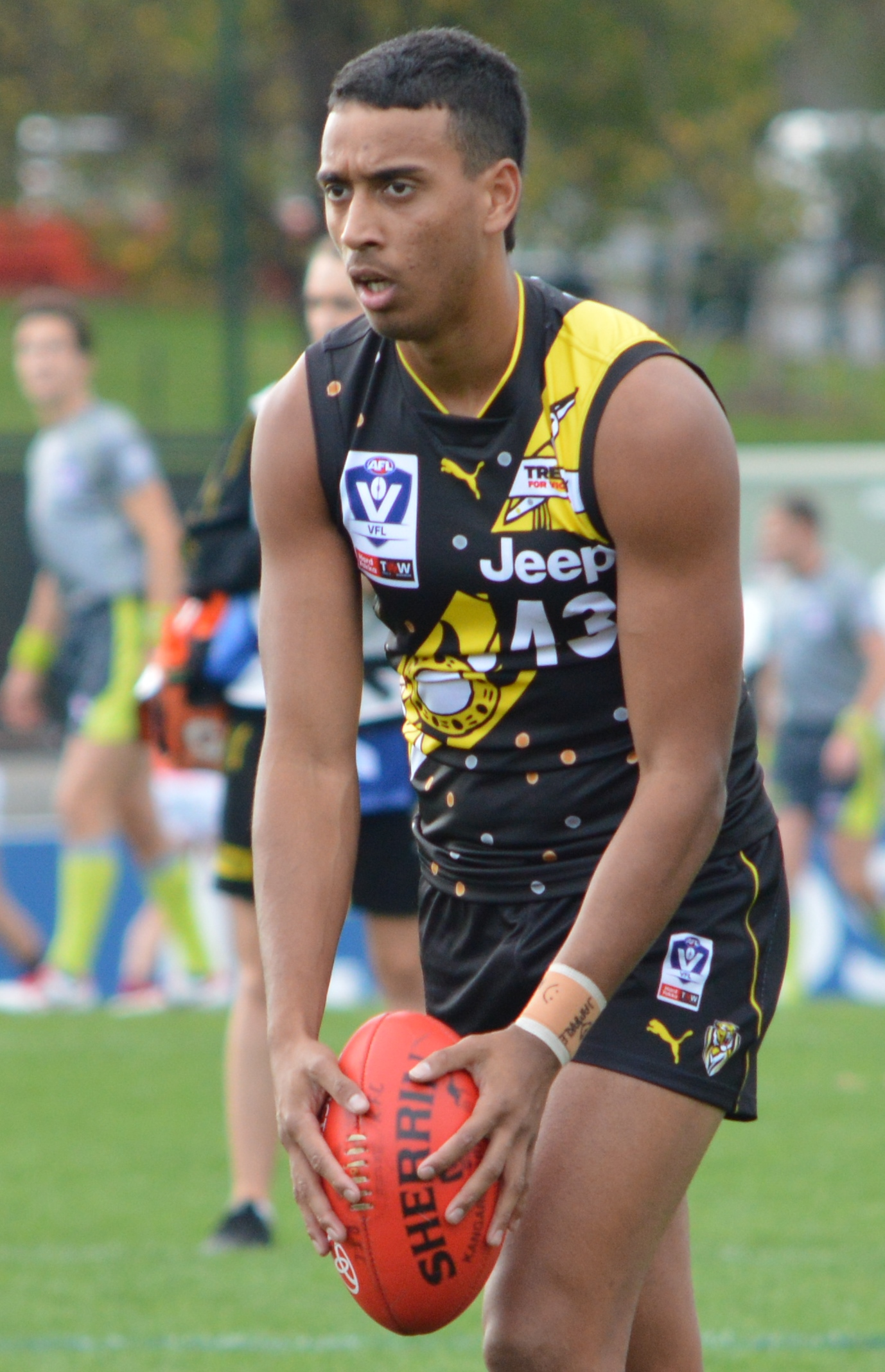
- Eggmolesse-Smith with Richmond's VFL side in May 2019

Personal information
- Born: 4 May 1998 (age 28)
- Original team: Bendigo Pioneers (TAC Cup)
- Draft: Category B rookie signing, 2018 rookie draft
- Debut: Round 16, 2019, Richmond vs. Gold Coast, at Metricon Stadium
- Height: 180 cm (5 ft 11 in)
- Weight: 80 kg (176 lb)
- Position: Half-back

Playing career^{1}
Years	Club	Games (Goals)
2018–2021	Richmond	9 (0)
- ^{1} Playing statistics correct to the end of 2021.

Career highlights
- VFL: VFL premiership player: 2019

Derek Eggmolesse-Smith (born 4 May 1998) is an Australian rules footballer who last played for the Richmond Football Club in the Australian Football League (AFL). After being overlooked in the 2016 draft, he became the first player ever to be signed by the club under the Next Generation Academy rules when he was contracted in November 2017. He made his AFL debut for the club in round 16 of the 2019 season and later that year became a VFL premiership player while playing reserves grade football for the club. He was de-listed at the end of the 2020 season but re-contracted ahead of the 2021 season after training with the team during the summer. He was not offered a new contract by the Richmond Football Club at the conclusion of the 2021 season.

== Early life, junior and state-league football ==
Eggmolesse-Smith grew up in Wentworth, New South Wales, a country town on the border with Victoria near Mildura, and is of Indigenous Australian (Barkindji) descent. He played local junior football with Wentworth in the Sunraysia Football League (SNFL) including in an under 16s premiership in 2014 with fellow future AFL players Jarrod Brander and Kobe Mutch. While eligible for the Greater Western Sydney academy in Wentworth, a family move south of the border to Mildura made Eggmolesse-Smith eligible to join the Richmond academy in its first intake in 2016. He was one of the first members of the club's newly created Next Generation Academy program for young Indigenous and multicultural players from the Sunraysia region of northern Victoria.

In 2016 he was a standout player for Wentworth in SFNL, finishing the season by winning both the league's Rising Star and Best and fairest awards. He also played three matches that season for the region's junior representative team, the Bendigo Pioneers in the TAC Cup. In the lead up to the 2016 draft period, Richmond officially nominated Eggmolesse-Smith for priority draft access under the league's academy rules, enabling the club to sign him as a category B rookie should he be passed over by all other clubs in the national and rookie drafts. Though he would indeed go undrafted, Richmond ultimately decided to pass on the chance to sign him.

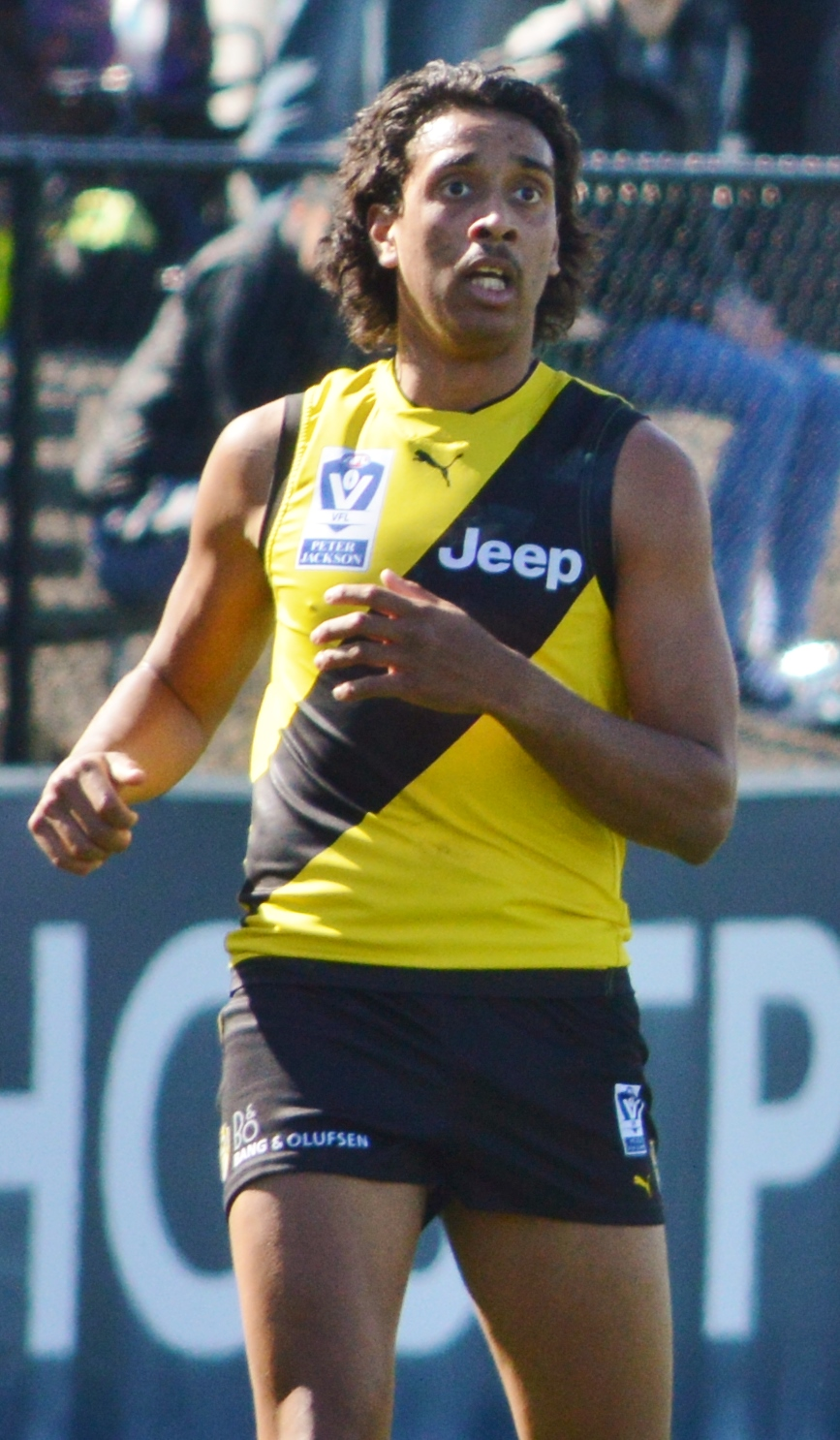
Egmolesse-Smith with Richmond's VFL team while a member of the club's Indigenous Academy in August 2017

Ahead of the 2017 footballing season, Eggmolesse-Smith moved to Melbourne, pursuing an opportunity to play higher grade local football and train with Richmond's reserves team. That year he played with the Fitzroy Stars in the Northern Football League, returned to Wentworth for limited matches in the Sunraysia League and also featured with the Bendigo Pioneers in TAC Cup. He played VFL football for Richmond's reserves side for the first time in late-May 2017. That same month he played in an exhibition match for promising young indigenous footballers, held on the MCG prior to that season's Dreamtime at the 'G AFL match. Eggmoless-Smith finished the VFL season having played five matches and averaging 14 disposals per game.

Eggmolesse-Smith was again nominated by Richmond ahead of the 2017 draft period, with a media report from Fox Footy suggesting the club was considering using a national draft choice on him and was near-certain to sign him should he go undrafted.

== Senior Football Career ==
=== 2018 season ===
Eggmolesse-Smith was signed by Richmond as a category B rookie in November 2017 under the league's academy rules. He was the first player from the program ever to be signed to the club's AFL list.

He made his first appearance for Richmond when he represented the club in a series of AFLX exhibition matches in Sydney in February 2018. Before the season officially began however, Eggmolesse-Smith suffered a stress fracture in his lower leg. After spending most of the season on the sidelines, Eggmolesse-Smith returned to football with the club's reserves side in the VFL in early August. After finishing as minor premiers, Richmond's reserves side lined up a home qualifying final against Williamstown in which Eggmolesse-Smith featured as a defender. After a loss in that match, Richmond's reserves side suffered a knock-out loss the following week which saw the team and Eggmolesse-Smith's season come to a close. Eggmolesse-Smith finished 2018 having failed to earn an AFL debut, instead playing four matches with the club's reserves side in the VFL.

=== 2019 season ===
After being re-contracted in the off-season, Egmolesse-Smith began the 2019 season with Richmond's VFL side where he impressed in pre-season matches in March. He continued at that level through the opening months of the season, impressing VFL coach Craig McRae with his defensive play. In early May Eggmolesse-Smith had what McCrae labelled "arguably the best game he’s played for the club" when he recorded 21 disposals and seven rebound-50s in a VFL win over Williamstown. Later that month he played strongly in the club's Indigenous Round VFL match and featured in the club's the war cry performance ceremony before that match. Eggmolesse-Smith was named as an AFL-level emergency in round 13 after a strong run of form at VFL level. He would have to wait another three weeks before earning an AFL debut, elevated to the club's primary list in place of the long-term injury listed Alex Rance and playing his first match in the club's round 16 match against Gold Coast at Metricon Stadium. Eggmolesse-Smith collected 19 disposals and four rebound-50s on debut, holding his spot for round 17's match against Greater Western Sydney. He was one of five Indigenous players for Richmond in that match, a new club record. After two matches at AFL level, Eggmolesse-Smith was dropped back to VFL level in late July where he immediately starred with 26 disposals and nine marks at half-back. He remained at the lower level through the end of the VFL team's minor-premiership winning home and away season, though missed most of one match with a corked buttock sustained mid-match. In a come-from-behind qualifying final win over the Essendon reserves, Eggmolesse-Smith notched 20 disposals, before adding another 17 in the VFL preliminary final a fortnight later as Richmond's reserves won through to that league's grand final. In the VFL grand final, Eggmolesse-Smith was named by AFL Media as one of Richmond's best players, notching 20 disposals as his side defeated Williamstown to earn the club won its first reserves grade premiership since 1997. Eggmolesse-Smith finished 2019 having played two matches at AFL level, as well as a further 19 with the club's VFL premiership winning reserves side.

=== 2020 season ===
After a full pre-season of training, Eggmolesse-Smith first played in 2020 with the club's reserves side in VFL practice matches in March. The season was postponed before its opening round however, owing to safety concerns as a result of the rapid progression of the coronavirus pandemic into Australia. The AFL season began in late March without Eggmolesse-Smith able to earn selection, before it too was postponed due to the pandemic after just one round was played. After an 11-week hiatus, Eggmolesse-Smith returned to competitive match play in an unofficial scratch match against Collingwood's reserves on the same week as the AFL's round 2 matchup between the two clubs, arranged in place of the now cancelled VFL season. Following a further three scratch matches at reserves level, he was recalled to AFL level for round 6's match against Sydney in place of Bachar Houli, who had elected not to travel with the team after a virus outbreak in Melbourne forced it to be relocated to the Gold Coast. As with all matches in the reduced 17-round season that year, it was held with playing time reduced by one fifth, owing to the need for clubs to play multiple games on short breaks later in the year. A week later he produced a standout best-on-ground performance, earning two Brownlow Medal votes and a match-high eight Coaches Association award votes for a stat sheet that included 471 metres gained and a team-high 23 disposals in the win over North Melbourne on the Gold Coast. He remained in the senior side for a further four matches, before being dropped to reserves level following a seven clanger performance in round 11's loss to Port Adelaide. Eggmolesse-Smith continued to play reserves football for the final weeks of the shortened season and into the club's AFL finals campaign. Eggmolesse-Smith remained unselected through the course of the finals series, unable to earn selection while his teammates earned the club a second successive AFL premiership. He finished the season having played six AFL matches. At the end of the season, Eggmolesse-Smith was delisted by Richmond after a three-year stint at the club which included eight AFL matches.

=== 2021 season ===
After being overlooked by all 18 clubs at the 2020 national and rookie drafts, Eggmolesse-Smith was offered an opportunity to win back his spot at Richmond under the league's pre-season supplemental selection rules. He trained well over the summer with focus on building his endurance before featuring in the club's one official pre-season match with eight disposals from a limited 31 per cent time on ground. In the second week of March, Eggmolesse-Smith was formally re-signed for a one-year contract. He spent the opening two rounds of the season playing reserves football with the club's VFL side, before earning selection at AFL level for the club's round 3 match against Sydney. After recording just nine disposals in the match and owing to the return from injury of veteran half-back Bachar Houli, Eggmolesse-Smith was returned to VFL level after just one match.

=== 2024 season ===
Derek Eggmolesse-Smith currently play's for the Sale Football Club in the Gippsland League in which he plays half-back averaging 27.5 disposals while going at 67% by foot and averaging 2 intercept marks per game for the magpies as of round 4.

== Player profile ==
Eggmolesse-Smith plats as a rebounding half-back. He is a natural left-foot kicker and is notable for his ball-use by foot.

== Statistics ==
Statistics are correct to the end of round 11, 2021

Legend
G	Goals	K	Kicks	D	Disposals	T	Tackles
B	Behinds	H	Handballs	M	Marks

Season	Team	No.	Games	Totals							Averages (per game)						
Season	Team	No.	Games	G	B	K	H	D	M	T	G	B	K	H	D	M	T
2018	Richmond	43	0	—	—	—	—	—	—	—	—	—	—	—	—	—	—
2019	Richmond	43	2	0	0	19	16	35	4	4	0.0	0.0	9.5	8.0	17.5	2.0	2.0
2020 (Note: The 2020 season was played with five fewer home & away season matches per team, and with the playing time of each match reduced by 20%.)	Richmond	43	6	0	0	53	24	77	15	13	0.0	0.0	8.8	4.0	12.8	2.5	2.2
2021	Richmond	43	1	0	0	6	3	9	1	2	0.0	0.0	6.0	3.0	9.0	1.0	2.0
Career			9	0	0	78	43	121	20	19	0.0	0.0	8.7	4.8	13.4	2.2	2.1

== Personal life ==
Eggmolesse-Smith is a Barkindji Aboriginal man.
