= Jess Kennedy =

Australian rules footballer (born 1990)

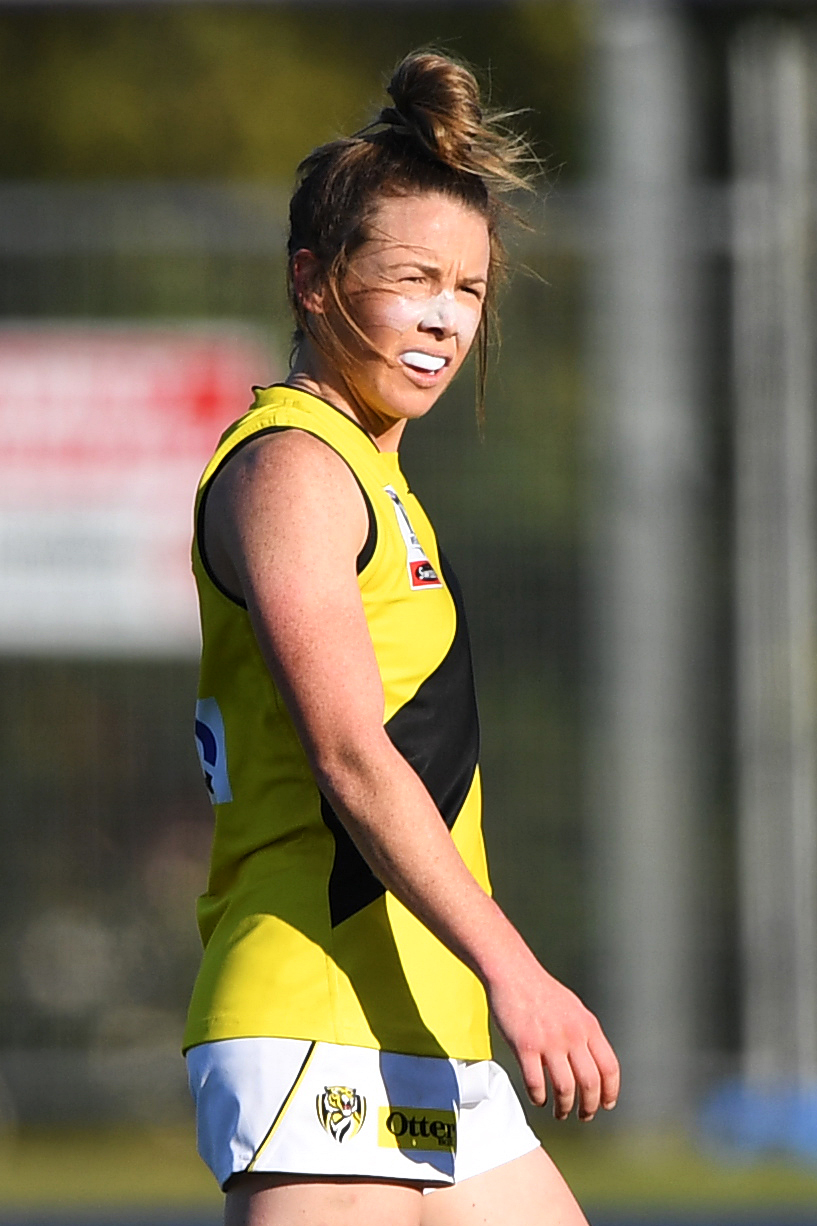
- Kennedy in June 2019

Personal information
- Full name: Jessica Kennedy
- Born: 12 July 1990 (age 36)
- Original team: Bendigo (VFL Women's)
- Draft: 2016 free agent: Carlton
- Debut: Round 1, 2017, Carlton vs. Collingwood, at Ikon Park
- Height: 165 cm (5 ft 5 in)
- Position: Midfielder

Playing career^{1}
Years	Club	Games (Goals)
2017	Carlton	4 (0)
- ^{1} Playing statistics correct to the end of 2017.

Career highlights
- VFLW: Richmond best and fairest: 2018

Jess Kennedy (born 12 July 1990) is an Australian rules footballer who played for the Carlton Football Club in the AFL Women's competition (AFLW). She was recruited by Carlton as a free agent following the 2016 AFL Women's draft. She made her debut in Round 1, 2017, in the club and the league's inaugural match at Ikon Park against Collingwood. Kennedy finished 2017 having played in four matches with Carlton. She was subsequently delisted at season's end.

Kennedy joined Richmond's VFL Women's side for its first season in 2018 and was named the club's first women's team captain. She won the inaugural best and fairest award that season.
