= Josh Caddy =

Australian rules footballer (born 1992)

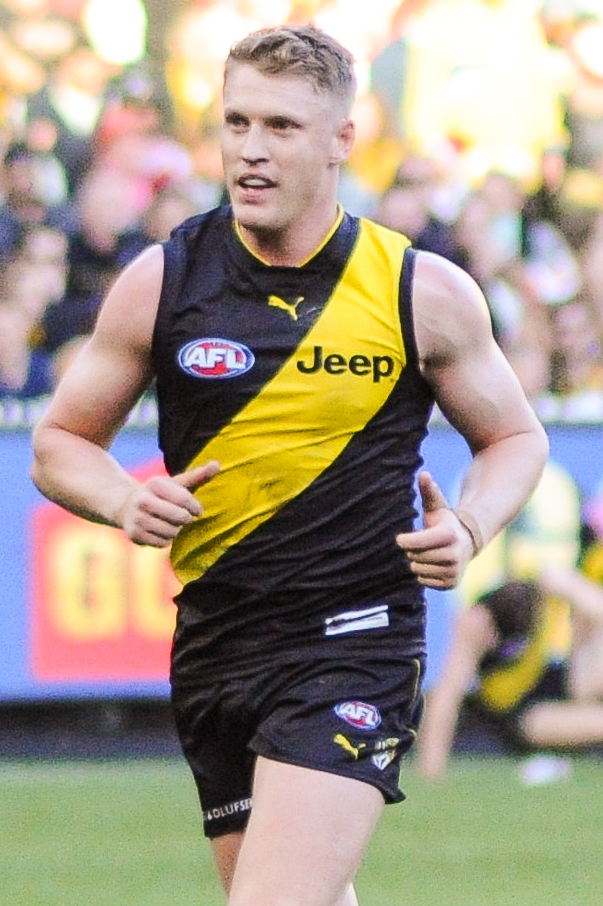
- Caddy playing for Richmond in June 2017

Personal information
- Full name: Joshua Nicholas Caddy
- Nicknames: King Caddy, Cadds
- Born: 28 September 1992 (age 34)
- Original teams: Northern Knights (TAC Cup); Eltham (Northern Football League)
- Draft: No. 7, 2010 AFL National draft: Gold Coast
- Debut: Round 23, 2011, Gold Coast vs. Melbourne, at MCG
- Height: 190 cm (6 ft 3 in)
- Weight: 88 kg (194 lb)
- Position: Midfielder / forward

Playing career^{1}
| Years | Club | Games (Goals) |
| 2011–2012 | Gold Coast | 24 (17) |
| 2013–2016 | Geelong | 71 (59) |
| 2017–2022 | Richmond | 79 (88) |
| Total | | 174 (164) |
- ^{1} Playing statistics correct to the end of 2022 season.

Career highlights
- 2× AFL premiership player: 2017, 2019; Ian Stewart Medal: 2018; AFL Rising Star nominee: 2012

Joshua Nicholas Caddy (born 28 September 1992) is a former professional Australian rules footballer who last played for the Richmond Football Club in the Australian Football League (AFL). He previously played for the Gold Coast Football Club from 2011 to 2012, and the Geelong Football Club from 2013 to 2016. Caddy was drafted by Gold Coast with the seventh selection in the 2010 AFL draft after captaining underage football with the Northern Knights in the TAC Cup. He was a premiership player with Richmond in both 2017 and 2019.

== Junior football ==
Caddy played junior football with Eltham in the Diamond Valley Football League before joining the Northern Knights in the TAC Cup. He played a handful of matches for the Knights in 2009 and went to be captain the club in 13 matches in the 2010 season. He placed second in the club's best and fairest that year. During this time he formed a friendship with Knights teammate and eventual Gold Coast and Richmond teammate, Dion Prestia.

In 2010 Caddy represented the Victorian Metropolitan side at the AFL Under 18 Championships after having previously done the same at under 16 level. He played three matches for the tournament, recording averages of 23.7 disposals and 3.3 marks per game. He was awarded All-Australian selection for his stellar performances.

== AFL career ==
=== Gold Coast (2011–2012) ===
==== 2011 season ====
Caddy was drafted by the Gold Coast Suns with the club's fourth selection and the seventh selection overall in the 2010 AFL draft.

He suffered a navicular bone injury early in the year, and was held back from football duties until late into the club's inaugural season. Caddy made his AFL debut in Round 23 that year, in a losing match against Melbourne at the MCG. He had 10 disposals, five marks and three tackles in the match. He kicked his first career goal the next week, in his second career match and the Suns' last game of the season.

At the conclusion of the season, it was reported that Caddy was seeking a trade to a Victorian-based club in order to be closer to his father, who was suffering a heart condition. He was linked to Essendon in October, after reports emerged that the club had offered Gold Coast a first-round draft selection and two contracted players (Josh Jenkins and one of Scott Gumbleton or Cale Hooker) in exchange for Caddy. Despite AFL-led mediation conducted to help the clubs negotiate, no deal was ultimately struck, and Caddy remained at the Gold Coast after the annual trade period concluded.

==== 2012 season ====
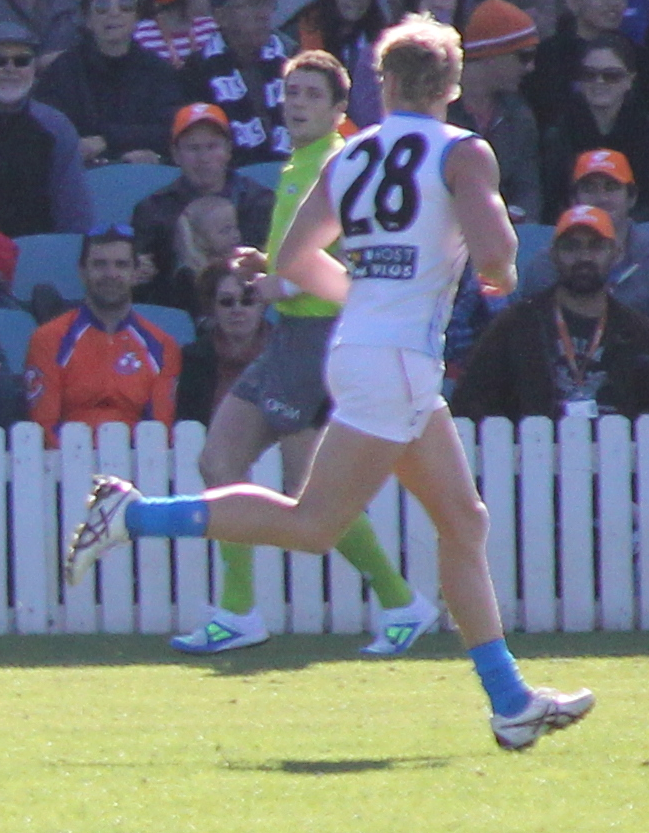
Caddy with Gold Coast in May 2012

2012 was a much better season for Caddy, playing in all 22 of the club's matches that year. In the club's Round 15 loss to Geelong, he recorded 18 disposals and a team high three goals in the 14 point loss. Despite his personal success, the poor form of the Suns meant Caddy did not play in his first AFL victory until his 17th career match, in Round 16 of the 2012 season. In this match, Caddy won the weekly nomination for the 2012 AFL Rising Star award. He finished the season ranked third at the club for total disposals (334), fourth for goals (15) and fifth for clearances (44).

In September 2012, the Gold Coast Suns announced that Caddy was again requesting a trade to a Victorian based club. Media reports at the time suggested Essendon were again seeking his services, this time along with St Kilda and Geelong.

=== Geelong (2013–2016) ===
==== 2013 season ====
In October 2012, Caddy was traded to Geelong in exchange for a third round and a first-round draft selection (which Geelong initially received for losing Gary Ablett Jr. to Gold Coast) in the upcoming 2012 AFL draft.

Caddy faced a restricted pre-season in 2013, with ongoing recovery necessary for shoulder surgery that he underwent in September 2012. Despite this, he was selected to make his Cats debut in the club's round 1 match against Hawthorn. He played in just six of the club's first 12 AFL matches that season, before playing 11 straight including a losing qualifying final against Fremantle. Though he did not play in the club's semi-final match, he returned to the club's losing preliminary final team against eventual premiers Hawthorn. He finished the season having played 18 matches and kicking a total of 11 goals.

==== 2014 season ====
Following an impressive close to 2013, Caddy won immediate selection into Geelong's AFL side for round 1, 2014. Despite receiving an accidental kick to the face by teammate and captain Joel Selwood (and seven stitches as a result), Caddy recorded an impressive 20 disposals and a goal in the match. He was named in Geelong's best players by AFL Media's report of the match. After four consecutive matches at the top level, Caddy sustained a foot injury while training in late April. Scans later revealed a serious break that would require eight weeks on the sidelines. He returned to the side for a round 14 match-up with Gold Coast. Caddy notched his 50th career game in round 17 that season. He recorded a career best 12 tackles in the match. Caddy played in all of the club's last 12 matches of the season including losing finals to Hawthorn and North Melbourne. Caddy had a team high 26 disposals in the losing semi-final to North Melbourne. He finished the season having played 16 matches and kicking 11 goals.

==== 2015 season ====
Caddy started the season in Geelong's best-22 for the third straight season when he lined up against Hawthorn in round 1, 2015. He was named in the Cats' best by AFL Media the following week, with a 20 disposal and 10 tackle effort against Fremantle in round 2. The Australian Associated Press labelled Caddy's 20 disposal, two goal, round 10 performance as a continuation of "his emergence as a goal-kicking midfielder of real class." He was labelled by 3AW's Matthew Lloyd as the Cats' second-best performer in the following weeks victory over Port Adelaide. Despite an apparently strong season to that point, Caddy was ranked seventh in the league for fewest disposals per turnover (4.2) at the end of round 11. In round 16, Caddy set career highs in disposals (37) and clearances (12) in the Cats' victory over the Western Bulldogs at Kardinia Park. In the latter part of the season Caddy endured symptoms of knee tendinitis and was subbed out early in the club's round 21 match against St Kilda as a result. He did not play another game that season, and finished the year with 19 games played, a then-career-best 16 goals and seventh place in the club's best-and-fairest tally.

==== 2016 season ====
With the addition of Patrick Dangerfield in the previous years' off-season, Caddy was in line to play more time in the forward 50 for Geelong in 2016. He started the season strongly, kicking three goals and recording 21 disposals and seven clearances in the club's round 1 win over Hawthorn. Caddy suffered a medial ligament strain in Geelong's round 13 match with the Western Bulldogs. He had played in each of the club's matches to that point, but was forced to sit-out nearly two months of senior football as a result of the injury. He returned to the side in round 20, kicking 2 goals and gathering 19 disposals in the process. Caddy played in his first career finals win in September 2016, in a qualifying final against Hawthorn. He finished the season having played 18 matches and kicking a career best 21 goals. He was eighth at the club for disposals per game, seventh for total tackles and sixth for goals scored in season 2016. Caddy was one of just ten players in the competition to record averages of 20 or more disposals and one goal per game on a minimum of five games played that season.

When Richmond's Brett Deledio began seeking a trade to Geelong in October 2016, Caddy's name was circulated in media reports concerning the potential deal. It was later revealed that Caddy's older brother Saul had run into former teammate and current Richmond CEO Brendon Gale in a chance encounter a month earlier and let slip of his younger brother's unrest at Geelong. Richmond reportedly offered Caddy increased midfield playing time as an incentive to move clubs. On 19 October, the day he himself had been traded to Richmond, former teammate Dion Prestia told journalists he had been in contact with Caddy in an attempt to lure him to the club. Though a deal involving Deledio eventually fell through, Richmond persisted in its pursuit of Caddy until late into the trade period.

=== Richmond (2017–2022) ===
==== 2017 season ====
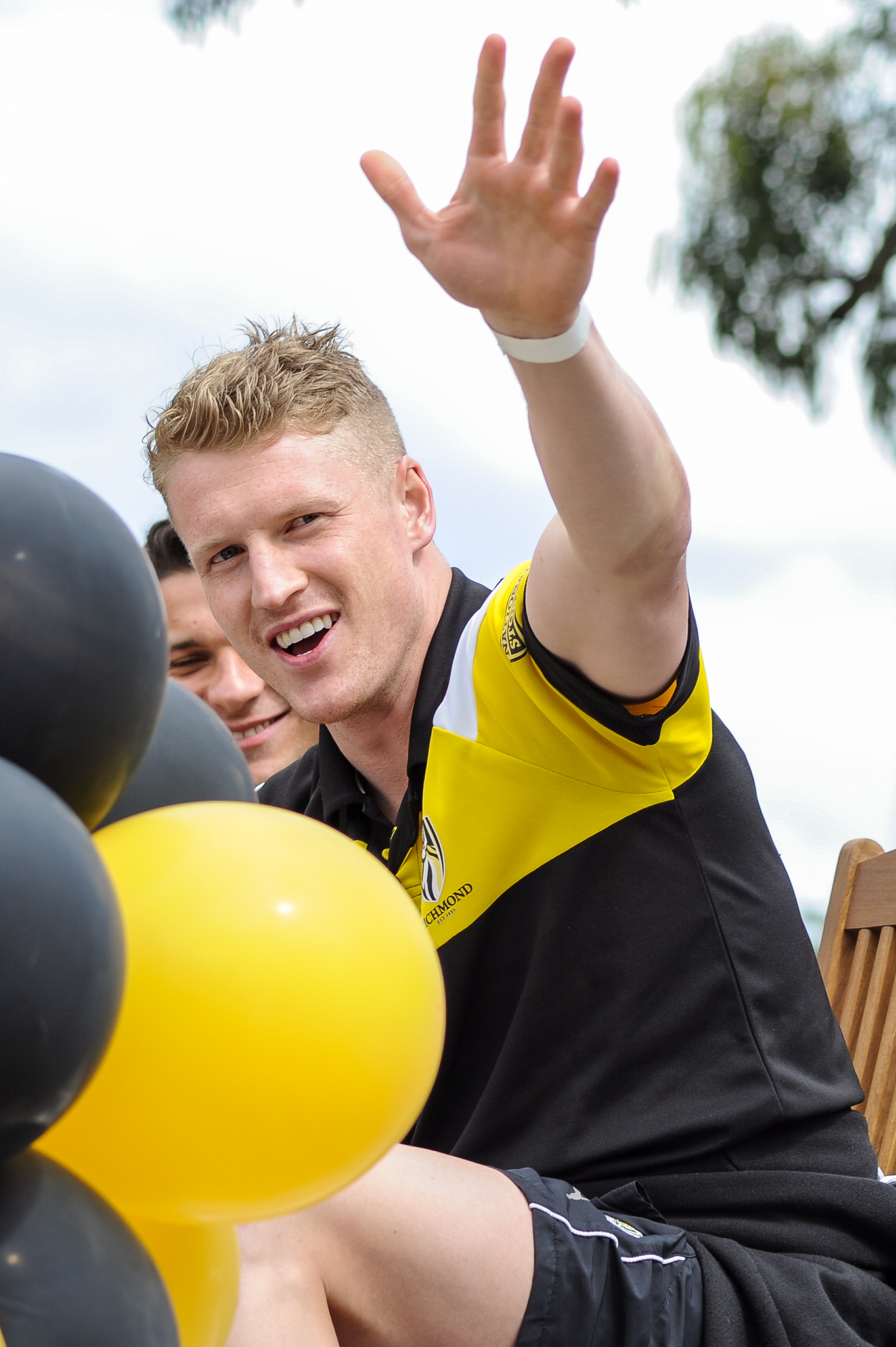
Caddy in the 2017 AFL Grand Final parade

Caddy was traded to Richmond on the final day of the trade period, in exchange for a second-round draft pick and a swap of later picks.

He made his Richmond debut in the opening match of the 2017 season, a victory against Carlton at the MCG. He recorded 17 disposals and a goal in the round 1 match. Caddy played his 100th career match in round 5's Anzac Day eve match against Melbourne. He had 21 disposals and 5 tackles in the match and kicked the match sealing goal late in the fourth quarter of Richmond's win. For the first time that season he was named among the club's best players for the match. Prior to round 7 coach Damien Hardwick admitted to having played Caddy away from the ball too regularly, committing him to more midfield time in coming weeks. He did well in the role that week, notching 20 disposals, three clearances, four tackles and a goal. After pulling up sore from a training session Caddy was a late withdrawal from Richmond's round 9 match against the GWS Giants. When full-forward teammate Jack Riewoldt sustained an eye injury, Caddy was called on to play as the team's focal point up forward. He kicked a goal in the first of these matches, before adding four more in the role against Hawthorn in round 20. It was a season best performance for him, adding 28 disposals, nine marks and even missing a further four shots on goal. He would not get a chance to repeat that performance though, suffering a hamstring strain early in the first quarter of the next week's match up against his old side Geelong. He missed two games as a result, making his return with two goals in Richmond's winning qualifying final against Geelong. From there Caddy and Richmond progressed to a preliminary final match-up with GWS, before a win saw them into a Grand Final against minor premiers Adelaide. Caddy became a premiership player following that match, kicking Richmond's first goal in his side's 48 point victory.

==== 2018 season ====
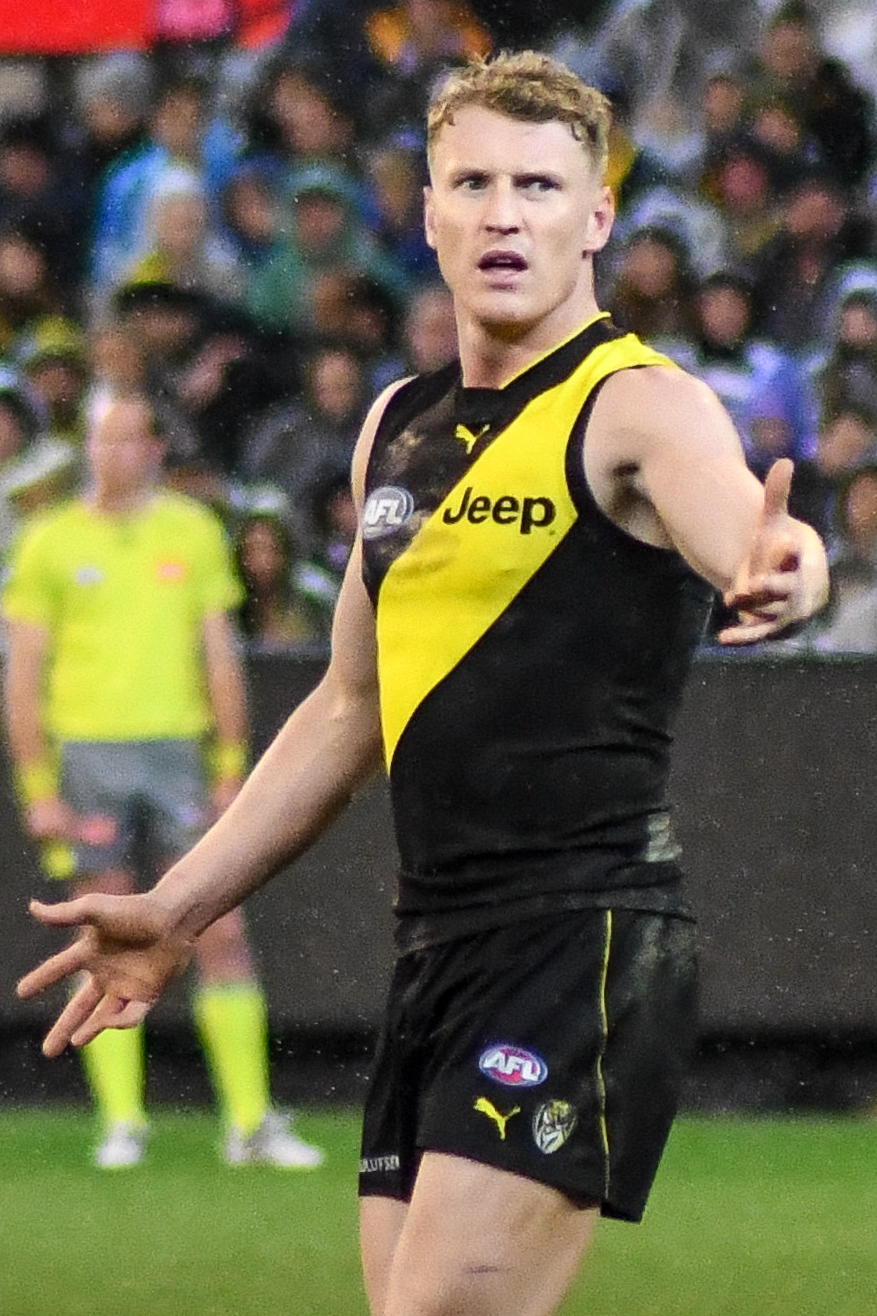
Caddy in August 2018

After featuring in each of Richmond's two pre-season matches as a forward with limited minutes in the midfield, Caddy began the 2018 season with three goals in round 1's season-opening win over Carlton. He repeated the total the following week, but was also issued a one-match suspension for striking Adelaide's David Mackay in the face with a stray fist in a marking contest during the fourth quarter of that round 2 loss. He made an immediate return to football in round 4, but was limited to just one game with hamstring soreness seeing him miss again in round 5. Upon his return in round 6, Caddy kicked a then-equal career best four goals in a win over Collingwood and was named in AFL Media's team of the week. He equaled that output in round 8 and went past it again with six goals in round 10. Along with his goal tally, Caddy added 24 disposals and a game high seven tackles to earn the Ian Stewart Medal as best on ground in that win over St Kilda. At the half-way point of the season Caddy was named in Fox Footy's mid-year All Australian squad and was named in the Herald Sun and AFL Media teams of 22 players. To that point he ranked the number one most improved player in the league according to Champion Data's official player ratings. He was also placed fourth in the league's goalkicking race with a total of 27 kicked over his nine matches, despite playing an analysed 61 per cent to 39 per cent split of forward and midfield minutes. Caddy was held goalless in round 12's loss to Port Adelaide, the first such occasion since beginning a 17-game goalscoring streak in round 18 the previous season. After kicking a total of eight goals across the next seven matches, Caddy returned to the major goalkickers list with four more in a win over Gold Coast in round 21. He repeated that tally in round 22, leading 1116 SEN commentator Gary Lyon to call for his inclusion in that year's All-Australian team. Caddy finished the home and away season having kicked a career-best 44 goals, earning him 10th place in the Coleman Medal race for the league's leading goalkicker. For that, he was named in the preliminary squad of 40 players though ultimately went unselected in the final 2018 All-Australian team. He was however, named in the forwardline of the AFL's Player Ratings seconds team for 2018. After finishing the season as minor premiers, Caddy's side earned a home qualifying final against Hawthorn where he kicked two goals in the win. He did however, attract two separate fines from the AFL's Match Review Officer for physical altercations and additionally issued a public apology for verbally abusing two of his opponents with derogatory ablest comments which were picked up on umpires' microphones and included in the television broadcast coverage of that match. In the ensuing preliminary final, Caddy was held goalless and with an equal season-low 11 disposals when Richmond was eliminated with a shock loss to rivals Collingwood. Caddy finished 2018 having played 22 matches and kicked 46 goals, earning 10th place in the Richmond club best and fairest award.

==== 2019 season ====
Caddy underwent minor ankle surgery in the early weeks of the 2018/19 off-season, but started pre-season training on schedule in November. During that period he was listed by the AFL's official statistical partner Champion Data as the 88th best player in the league. In February he picked up some ankle soreness while training which was expected to see him miss two to three weeks of training. That timeline was extended such that he missed both of the club's two pre-season matches in early and mid March. Caddy made his return to football in the VFL in April, during the weekend of the AFL's round 3. He was recalled to senior level the next week, where he contributed three goals in a win over Port Adelaide while playing as an inside midfielder and a forward in the absence of Dustin Martin. The off-season acquisition of goalkicking tall forward Tom Lynch forced Caddy down the pecking order in the Richmond forward line, but despise long stretches in the midfield he remained a key goalkicker in the early part of the season while fellow forward Jack Riewoldt was out injured. He kicked another two goals in round 5 before being named among Richmond's best players with 25 disposals and a goal in round 8's win over Fremantle. Caddy kicked three goals as a forward the following week against Hawthorn. In round 15 Caddy played his 150th AFL match, kicking one goal in the post-bye win over St Kilda. He was left out of the side the following week due to an apparent leg injury but was forced to make a return to football through the VFL a week later. Though Caddy impressed as an inside midfielder with two goals and 26 disposals in that match, he remained at the lower level for a further week in or order to trial a new role as a defensive wing. A minor ankle injury sustained at training in the days following that match would further delay his return to senior football, though Caddy would eventually be recalled for round 20's match against Melbourne after just one week on the injury list and without playing another reserves-grade match. Caddy held his spot at senior level over the final four weeks of the season, producing modest results in the role of defensive wing which he had trialed for one week at VFL level. He kicked two goals in that position in the opening round of the finals, as Richmond had a 47-point qualifying final victory over the Brisbane Lions. A fortnight later Caddy's output was quieter, producing an important five intercept possessions but also recording four turnovers from just 13 disposals in his side's preliminary final victory over Geelong. AFL Media said Caddy "did a little bit of everything" in the grand final, collecting 19 disposals and applying a game-high 25 pressure acts along with six tackles as his side defeated Greater Western Sydney by 89 points and earned Caddy a second premiership in three years. At year's end Caddy had played 18 matches and placed 20th in the club's best and fairest count.

==== 2020 season ====
After a full and uninterrupted training program in the 2019/20 off-season, Caddy resumed his role on the wing with fine performances in the pre-season series including being named by AFL Media as among the club's best players in the first of those two matches. He signed a new contract extension before the season proper began, committing to the club until the end of the 2022 season. Caddy contributed 15 disposals to a round 1 win over Carlton when the season began, but under extraordinary conditions imposed on the league as a result of the rapid progression of the coronavirus pandemic into Australia. In what the league planned would be the first of a reduced 17-round season, the match was played without crowds in attendance due to public health prohibitions on large gatherings and with quarter lengths reduced by one fifth in order to reduce the physical load on players who would be expected to play multiple matches with short breaks in the second half of the year. Just three days later, the AFL Commission suspended the season after multiple states enforced quarantine conditions on their borders that effectively ruled out the possibility of continuing the season as planned. After an 11-week hiatus, the season resumed without Caddy able to play, owing to a calf strain sustained while training in the days prior to Richmond's round 2 match. He required just one week of rest however, returning with 13 disposals in a round 3 loss to Hawthorn. Caddy struggled for form early in the season restart, attracting criticisms about his suitability to a wing role from media personalities Terry Wallace and Matthew Lloyd. He suffered a minor gluteus strain mid-match against in round 5 but was able to play through it, before suffering a significant torn hamstring during round 7's win over North Melbourne. Though club officials projected the injury would take three to four weeks to heal, Caddy beat expectations and returned to fitness in time to make a return for the club's round 11 match against Port Adelaide. He could not hold his spot however, dropped back to reserves level following a poor performance that included giving up a 50-metre penalty that resulted in an opposition goal. In place of the by-then cancelled VFL season, Caddy played in unofficial scratch matches against other clubs' reserves players in mid-August, before resurgent hamstring troubles ruled him out from match play at either level through early-September. He made a return to reserves grade football in mid-September, before being recalled for a forward line role in place of the injured Tom Lynch in the final round of the AFL regular season. Caddy kicked two goals in the win over Adelaide, but suffered a patella tendon injury midway through the match that left him in some doubt for the club's first round finals match-up with the Brisbane Lions. Though he was ruled fit enough to be named as an emergency in all four matches, Caddy could not break into the senior side over the course of the finals series, sidelined while his teammates earned the club a third AFL premiership in four seasons. Caddy finished the season having played just eight matches.

== Player profile ==
Caddy was capable of playing in multiple positions including as a goal-scoring half-forward, a ball-winning inside midfielder and as a defensive wing.

== Statistics ==
Updated to the end of round 23, 2022.

Legend
| G | Goals | K | Kicks | D | Disposals | T | Tackles |
| B | Behinds | H | Handballs | M | Marks |
| # | Played in that season's premiership team |

| Season | Team | No. | Games | Totals | | | | | | | Averages (per game) | | | | | | | Votes |
| Season | Team | No. | Games | G | B | K | H | D | M | T | G | B | K | H | D | M | T | Votes |
|---|---|---|---|---|---|---|---|---|---|---|---|---|---|---|---|---|---|---|
| 2011 | Gold Coast | 42 | 2 | 2 | 0 | 20 | 6 | 26 | 9 | 7 | 1.0 | 0.0 | 10.0 | 3.0 | 13.0 | 4.5 | 3.5 | 0 |
| 2012 | Gold Coast | 28 | 22 | 15 | 6 | 184 | 150 | 334 | 80 | 56 | 0.7 | 0.3 | 8.4 | 6.8 | 15.2 | 3.6 | 2.5 | 0 |
| 2013 | Geelong | 23 | 18 | 11 | 13 | 150 | 118 | 268 | 51 | 53 | 0.6 | 0.7 | 8.3 | 6.6 | 14.9 | 2.8 | 2.9 | 0 |
| 2014 | Geelong | 23 | 16 | 11 | 9 | 121 | 146 | 267 | 52 | 64 | 0.7 | 0.6 | 7.6 | 9.1 | 16.7 | 3.3 | 4.0 | 2 |
| 2015 | Geelong | 23 | 19 | 16 | 17 | 200 | 188 | 388 | 70 | 106 | 0.8 | 0.9 | 10.5 | 9.9 | 20.4 | 3.7 | 5.6 | 6 |
| 2016 | Geelong | 23 | 18 | 21 | 14 | 161 | 203 | 364 | 61 | 71 | 1.2 | 0.8 | 8.9 | 11.3 | 20.2 | 3.4 | 3.9 | 0 |
| 2017^{#} | Richmond | 22 | 22 | 21 | 22 | 225 | 155 | 380 | 92 | 68 | 1.0 | 1.0 | 10.2 | 7.0 | 17.3 | 4.2 | 3.1 | 3 |
| 2018 | Richmond | 22 | 22 | 46 | 15 | 216 | 147 | 363 | 80 | 69 | 2.1 | 0.7 | 9.8 | 6.7 | 16.5 | 3.6 | 3.1 | 6 |
| 2019^{#} | Richmond | 22 | 18 | 17 | 9 | 178 | 116 | 294 | 64 | 60 | 0.9 | 0.5 | 9.9 | 6.4 | 16.3 | 3.6 | 3.3 | 0 |
| 2020 (Note: The 2020 season was played with five fewer home & away season matches per team, and with the playing time of each match reduced by 20%.) | Richmond | 22 | 8 | 2 | 2 | 56 | 44 | 100 | 32 | 14 | 0.3 | 0.3 | 7.0 | 5.5 | 12.5 | 4.0 | 1.8 | 0 |
| 2021 | Richmond | 22 | 9 | 2 | 5 | 68 | 45 | 113 | 36 | 11 | 0.2 | 0.6 | 7.6 | 5.0 | 12.6 | 4.0 | 1.2 | 0 |
| 2022 | Richmond | 22 | 0 | – | – | – | – | – | – | – | – | – | – | – | – | – | – | – |
| Career | | | 174 | 164 | 112 | 1579 | 1318 | 2897 | 627 | 579 | 0.9 | 0.6 | 9.1 | 7.6 | 16.6 | 3.6 | 3.3 | 17 |

== Honours and achievements ==
Team

- 2× AFL premiership player: 2017, 2019
- McClelland Trophy (Richmond): 2018

Individual

- Ian Stewart Medal: 2018
- AFL Rising Star nominee: 2012

Junior

- U-18 All Australian: 2010
- Northern Knights captain: 2010

== Personal life ==
Caddy is son to parents Joanne and Adrian. He spent his formative years in the north-eastern Melbourne suburb of Eltham. He has two elder brothers, Saul and Jonathan and sister, Elisha. Saul spent a period of time on Richmond's supplementary list in the late 1990s. Caddy's nephew, Nate, plays for the Essendon Football Club.

Caddy is the grandson of former North Melbourne and St Kilda footballer John Reeves and a nephew of North Melbourne and Fitzroy player, Michael Reeves. Josh is the first cousin of Hawthorn ruckman Ned Reeves.

He attended high school at both Marcellin College and Eltham College in Melbourne's north-east.

He, along with teammates Dustin Martin, Reece Conca, Dion Prestia, Toby Nankervis and Anthony Miles, owns a small stake in racehorse Main Stage which ran in the 2017 spring racing carnival.

=== Burglary prank ===
Caddy and teammate Billie Smedts were embroiled in controversy in April 2013 as a result of an attempted prank gone wrong. The pair were arrested at gunpoint by local police after they were spotted wearing balaclavas and attempting to enter a local house in the Geelong suburb of Kardinia Park. They received a warning from police after it was revealed they were attempting to scare teammate Jackson Thurlow and had simply approached the wrong house. A concerned neighbour had called police reporting an armed robbery when she saw the players knock on the door of the neighbouring property. The incident was resolved without further action by police or disciplinary action by the club.
