= 2022 Richmond Football Club season =

AFL team season 2022

Richmond Football Club
2022 season
- President: Peggy O'Neal^{(9th season)}
- Coach: AFL: Damien Hardwick^{(13th season)} AFLW: Ryan Ferguson^{(2nd season)}
- Captains: AFL: Dylan Grimes & Toby Nankervis^{(1st season)} AFLW: Katie Brennan^{(3rd season)}
- Home ground: AFL: MCG; AFLW: Swinburne Centre
- AFL season: AFL: 7th (13-8-1); AFLW: 11th (3-7-0)
- 2022 AFL finals series: AFL: Elimination Final; AFLW: DNQ
- Jack Dyer Medal: AFL: Tom Lynch; AFLW: Monique Conti
- Leading goalkicker: AFL: Tom Lynch (63); AFLW: Katie Brennan

The 2022 season is the 115th season in which the Richmond Football Club has participated in the VFL/AFL and the third season in which it participated in the AFL Women's competition.

== AFL ==
=== 2022 season ===
The AFL season will run from March 2022 to August 2022.

=== 2021 off-season list changes ===
==== Retirements and delistings ====
Player	Reason	Club games	Career games	Ref
Bachar Houli	Retired	206	232	
David Astbury	Retired	155	155	
Patrick Naish	Delisted	9	9	
Bigoa Nyuon	Delisted	0	0	

==== Free agency ====
Date	Player	Free agent type	Former club	New club	Compensation	Ref
1 October	Mabior Chol	Unrestricted	Richmond	Gold Coast	End of 2nd round - Band 4 (Pick 38)	

==== Trades ====
Date	Gained	Lost	Trade partner	Ref
8 October	Robbie Tarrant	Callum Coleman-Jones	North Melbourne	
8 October	Pick 40	Pick 42	North Melbourne	
8 October	2022 second round pick (NM)	Pick 47	North Melbourne	
8 October	2022 second round pick (NM)	2022 fourth round pick (Ric)	North Melbourne	
18 October	Pick 27	Pick 38	Collingwood	
18 October	Pick 27	Pick 40	Collingwood	
18 October	Pick 27	2021 third round pick (Ric)	Collingwood	

==== National draft ====
Round	Overall pick	Player	State	Position	Team from	League from	Ref
1	9	Josh Gibcus	VIC	Tall defender	GWV Rebels	NAB League Boys	
1	17	Tom Brown	VIC	Defender	Murray Bushrangers	NAB League Boys	
2	28	Tyler Sonsie	VIC	Midfielder	Eastern Ranges	NAB League Boys	
2	29	Sam Banks	TAS	Defender / Wing	Tasmania Devils	NAB League Boys	
2	30	Judson Clarke	VIC	Small forward	Dandenong Stingrays	NAB League Boys	

==== Rookie draft ====
Round	Overall pick	Player	State	Position	Team from	League from	Ref
1	7	Bigoa Nyuon	VIC	Tall defender	Richmond (re-draft)	AFL	

=== Mid-season draft ===
Pick	Player	Position	Team from	League from	Ref
10	Jacob Bauer	Tall forward	North Adelaide	SANFL	

=== 2022 squad ===
Richmond Football Club
Senior list		Rookie list	Coaching staff
1 Nick Vlastuin; 2 Dylan Grimes (c); 3 Dion Prestia; 4 Dustin Martin; 5 Jack Ross; 6 Robbie Tarrant; 7 Liam Baker; 8 Jack Riewoldt; 9 Trent Cotchin; 10 Shane Edwards; 11 Jason Castagna; 15 Jayden Short; 17 Daniel Rioli; 19 Tom Lynch; 20 Ivan Soldo; 21 Noah Balta; 22 Josh Caddy; 23 Kane Lambert	25 Toby Nankervis (c); 26 Riley Collier-Dawkins; 27 Thomson Dow; 28 Josh Gibcus; 29 Shai Bolton; 30 Tom Brown; 31 Rhyan Mansell; 32 Samson Ryan; 33 Kamdyn McIntosh; 34 Jack Graham; 35 Nathan Broad; 36 Will Martyn; 38 Noah Cumberland; 40 Tyler Sonsie; 41 Sam Banks; 42 Judson Clarke; 45 Hugo Ralphsmith; 49 Maurice Rioli Jr	16 Jake Aarts; 37 Matthew Parker; 39 Mate Colina (B); 43 Jacob Bauer; 44 Sydney Stack; 46 Ben Miller; 47 Bigoa Nyuon; 50 Marlion Pickett	Head coach: Damien Hardwick; Assistant coaches: Adam Kingsley (backline); David Teague (forwards/ball movement); Andrew McQualter (TBD); Sam Lonergan (TBD); Xavier Clarke (TBD); Steve Morris (VFL); Ivan Maric (ruck); Legend: (c) Captain(s); (vc) Vice-captain(s); (B) Category B rookie; Long-term injury; (ret.) Retired; Updated: 22 February 2026; Source(s): Senior list, Rookie list, Coaching staff

=== 2022 season ===
==== Pre-season community series ====
Date	Score	Opponent	Opponent's score	Result	Home/away	Venue	Attendance
Saturday 5 March, 1:10pm	14.10 (94)	Hawthorn	9.15 (69)	Won by 25 points	Away	Devonport Oval	8,412

==== Home and away season ====
Round	Date	Score	Opponent	Opponent's score	Result	Home/away	Venue	Attendance	Ladder
1	Thursday 17 March, 7:25pm	11.10 (76)	Carlton	14.17 (101)	Lost by 25 points	Away	MCG	72,179	14th
2	Sunday 27 March, 1:10pm	16.13 (109)	Greater Western Sydney	10.13 (73)	Won by 36 points	Home	MCG	28,813	9th
3	Sunday 3 April, 3:20pm	13.6 (84)	St Kilda	18.9 (117)	Lost by 33 points	Away	Marvel Stadium	31,933	11th
4	Saturday 9 April, 4:35pm	15.9 (99)	Western Bulldogs	7.19 (61)	Won by 36 points	Home	MCG	43,645	10th
5	Saturday 16 April, 4:35pm	12.10 (82)	Adelaide	15.11 (101)	Lost by 19 points	Away	Adelaide Oval	33,031	11th
6	Sunday 24 April, 7:25pm	8.6 (54)	Melbourne	9.22 (76)	Lost by 22 points	Home	MCG	70,334	12th
7	Friday 29 April, 6:10pm	25.15 (165)	West Coast	8.8 (56)	Won by 109 points	Away	Optus Stadium	39,430	9th
8	Saturday 7 May, 1:45pm	17.11 (113)	Collingwood	12.14 (86)	Won by 27 points	Home	MCG	64,481	8th
9	Saturday 14 May, 1:45pm	17.15 (117)	Hawthorn	14.10 (94)	Won by 23 points	Away	MCG	40,663	8th
10	Saturday 21 May, 7:30pm	11.14 (80)	Essendon	7.6 (48)	Won by 32 points	Home	MCG	31,127	8th
11	Friday 27 May, 7:50pm	15.10 (100)	Sydney	16.10 (106)	Lost by 6 points	Away	SCG	31,387	9th
12	BYE								10th
13	Thursday 9 June, 7:20pm	11.11 (77)	Port Adelaide	10.5 (65)	Won by 12 points	Home	MCG	21,757	9th
14	Thursday 15 June, 7:20pm	11.15 (81)	Carlton	9.12 (66)	Won by 15 points	Home	MCG	50,741	6th
15	Saturday 25 June, 4:35pm	13.8 (86)	Geelong	13.11 (89)	Lost by 3 points	Away	MCG	59,335	9th
16	Sunday 3 July, 2:10pm	20.8 (128)	West Coast	13.15 (93)	Won by 35 points	Home	MCG	39,391	7th
17	Saturday 9 July, 4:35pm	13.14 (92)	Gold Coast	14.10 (94)	Lost by 2 points	Away	Metricon Stadium	18,031	8th
18	Saturday 16 July, 4:35pm	11.22.(88)	North Melbourne	14.10 (92)	Lost By 4 points	Away	Marvel Stadium	22,666	8th
19	Friday 22 July, 7:50pm	7.10.(52)	Fremantle	7.10.(52)	Draw	Home	Marvel Stadium	23,549	10th
20	Sunday 31 July, 4:40pm	15.14 (104)	Brisbane Lions	14.13 (97)	Won by 7 points	Home	MCG	39,056	9th
21	Saturday 6 August, 7:10pm	16.13 (109)	Port Adelaide	10.11 (71)	Won by 38 points	Away	Adelaide Oval	27,091	8th
22	Sunday 14 August, 1:10pm	20.8 (128)	Hawthorn	9.13 (67)	Won by 61 points	Home	MCG	59,338	7th
23	Saturday 20 August, 7:25pm	21.15 (141)	Essendon	11.9 (75)	Won by 66 points	Away	MCG	58,366	7th

==== Finals ====
Match	Date	Score	Opponent	Opponent's Score	Result	Home/Away	Venue	Attendance
Elimination final	Thursday 1 September, 7:20pm	16.8 (104)	Brisbane Lions	16.10 (106)	Lost by 2 points	Away	The Gabba	35,013

=== Awards ===
==== League awards ====
===== All-Australian team =====
	Player	Position	Appearance
Named	Shai Bolton	Half-forward	1st
Nominated	Tom Lynch	-	-
Nominated	Daniel Rioli	-	-

===== Rising Star =====
Nominations:

Round	Player	Placing	Ref
17	Hugo Ralphsmith	-	
20	Noah Cumberland	-	

===== 22 Under 22 team =====
	Player	Position	Appearance
Nominated	Noah Balta	-	-

==== Club awards ====
===== Jack Dyer Medal =====
Position	Player	Votes	Medal
1st	Tom Lynch	60	Jack Dyer Medal
2nd	Daniel Rioli	59	Jack Titus Medal
3rd	Dion Prestia	56	Maurie Fleming Medal
4th	Shai Bolton	53	Fred Swift Medal
4th	Liam Baker	53	Fred Swift Medal
6th	Trent Cotchin	52	
6th	Jayden Short	52	
8th	Toby Nankervis	47	
8th	Marlion Pickett	47	
10th	Nathan Broad	46	

===== Michael Roach Medal =====
Position	Player	Goals
1st	Tom Lynch	63
2nd	Shai Bolton	43
3rd	Jack Riewoldt	40
4th	Noah Cumberland	19
5th	Shane Edwards	15

== AFL Women's ==
=== 2022 season (summer/season six) ===
==== 2021 off-season list changes ====
===== Special assistance =====
After poor on-field performances in 2020 and 2021, the AFL decided to award special assistance to Richmond in the form of a mid-second round draft selection (originally number 26 overall).

===== Retirements and delistings =====
Player	Reason	Club games	Career games	Ref
Phoebe Monahan	Delisted	12	22	
Akec Makur Chuot	Delisted	12	18	
Alice Edmonds	Delisted	6	6	
Alana Woodward	Delisted	5	5	
Holly Whitford	Delisted	4	8	
Luka Lesosky-Hay	Delisted	1	1	
Emily Harley	Delisted	0	0	
Cleo Saxon-Jones	Delisted	0	0	

===== Trades =====
Date	Gained	Lost	Trade partner	Ref
31 May	Maddie Shevlin	Sabrina Frederick	Collingwood	
31 May	Pick 16	Pick 26	Collingwood	
31 May	Pick 48	Pick 55	Collingwood	
2 June	Poppy Kelly	Pick 48	St Kilda	
9 June	Jess Hosking	Pick 23	Carlton	
9 June	Pick 55	Pick 40	Carlton	
9 June	Pick 57	Pick 40	Carlton	

===== National draft =====
Round	Overall pick	Player	Position	Team from	League from	Ref
1	5	Stella Reid	Midfielder / forward	Oakleigh Chargers	NAB League	
1	16	Emelia Yassir	Small forward	Calder Cannons	NAB League	
4	48	Meagan Kiely	Midfielder	North Melbourne	VFL Women's	
4	50	Ingrid Houtsma	Wing	Geelong Falcons	NAB League	
5	54	Akec Makur Chuot	Half-back	Richmond	AFL Women's	

==== 2022 squad (season six) ====
Richmond Football Club (AFL Women's)
Senior list		Inactive list	Coaching staff
1 Sophie Molan; 3 Katie Brennan; 4 Monique Conti; 5 Maddy Brancatisano; 6 Christina Bernardi; 7 Sarah Hosking; 8 Courtney Wakefield; 9 Hannah Burchell; 10 Kodi Jacques; 11 Jess Hosking; 12 Sarah D'Arcy; 14 Poppy Kelly; 15 Rebecca Miller; 16 Laura McClelland; 17 Sarah Dargan; 18 Sarah Sansonetti	19 Kate Dempsey; 22 Ellie McKenzie; 23 Harriet Cordner; 24 Tayla Stahl; 25 Stella Reid; 27 Emelia Yassir; 28 Gabby Seymour; 31 Meagan Kiely; 32 Beth Lynch; 33 Akayla Peterson; 34 Akec Makur Chuot; 35 Maddie Shevlin; 36 Ingrid Houtsma; 37 Tessa Lavey; 38 Meg Macdonald	21 Iilish Ross; 29 Hannah McLaren	Head coach: Ryan Ferguson; Assistant coaches: Andrew Browne (midfield/stoppages); Lauren Tesoriero (backline); Nathan Chapman (specialist); Emma Grant (development); Legend: (c) Captain(s); (vc) Vice-captain(s)

==== 2022 season (season six) ====
===== Home and away season =====
Round	Date	Score	Opponent	Opponent's score	Result	Home/away	Venue	Attendance	Ladder (of 14)
1	Friday 7 January, 7:15pm	10.1 (61)	St Kilda	3.5 (23)	Won by 38 points	Away	SkyBus Stadium	3,324	3rd
2	Friday 14 January, 7:10pm	6.2 (38)	Melbourne	8.6 (54)	Lost by 16 points	Home	Swinburne Centre	1,517	5th
3	Saturday 22 January, 5:10pm	7.5 (47)	Fremantle	11.11 (77)	Lost by 30 points	Home	Swinburne Centre	1,078	8th
4	Sunday 30 January, 4:10pm	5.4 (34)	Gold Coast	5.9 (39)	Lost by 5 points	Away	Metricon Stadium	1,329	9th
5	Sunday 6 February, 1:10pm	1.7 (13)	Western Bulldogs	4.6 (30)	Lost by 17 points	Away	VU Whitten Oval	2,159	9th
6	Saturday 12 February, 2:10pm	2.6 (18)	North Melbourne	5.7 (37)	Lost by 19 points	Home	Swinburne Centre	1,093	9th
7	Saturday 19 February, 4:10pm	10.8 (68)	West Coast	7.3 (45)	Won by 23 points	Away	Mineral Resources Park	878	9th
8	Saturday 26 February, 5:10pm	1.4 (10)	Geelong	5.3 (33)	Lost by 23 points)	Home	Swinburne Centre	1,521	12th
9	Saturday 5 March, 5:10pm	7.4 (46)	Greater Western Sydney	6.2 (38)	Won by 8 points	Away	GIANTS Stadium	613	10th
10	Saturday 12 March, 3:10pm	1.3 (9)	Brisbane	6.11 (47)	Lost by 38 points	Away	Victoria Park	2,221	11th

=== Awards ===
==== League awards ====
===== All-Australian team =====
	Player	Position	Appearance
Named	Katie Brennan	Centre half-forward	2nd
Named	Monique Conti	Interchange	3rd
Nominated	Rebecca Miller	-	-

===== 22 Under 22 team =====
	Player	Position	Appearance
Named	Monique Conti (captain)	On-ball	3rd

==== Club awards ====
===== Best and Fairest award =====
Position	Player	Votes
1st	Monique Conti	23
2nd	Rebecca Miller	17
3rd	Gabby Seymour	16
4th	Katie Brennan	15
5th	Tessa Lavey	11
5th	Sarah Hosking	11
5th	Jess Hosking	11
8th	Maddy Brancatisano	8
8th	Kate Dempsey	8
10th	Maddie Shevlin	7
10th	Ellie McKenzie	7
10th	Sarah D'Arcy	7
10th	Beth Lynch	7

===== Leading goalkicker award =====
Position	Player	Goals
1st	Katie Brennan	14
2nd	Christina Bernardi	5
2nd	Tayla Stahl	5
4th	Tessa Lavey	4
5th	Meagan Kiely	3
5th	Courtney Wakefield	3
5th	Emelia Yassir	3

== 2022 season (spring/season seven) ==
In May 2022, the AFL announced it would shift the timing of the AFL Women's competition, beginning the season in the last weekend of August for the first time. As a result, the first season under this arrangement was the second season played in the 2022 calendar year.

=== 2022 (season six) off-season list changes ===
==== Retirements and delistings ====
Player	Reason	Club games	Career games	Ref
Tayla Stahl	Retired	21	21	
Christina Bernardi	Delisted	19	39	
Akec Makur Chuot	Delisted	17	23	
Sarah Sansonetti	Delisted	17	17	
Iilish Ross	Delisted	10	21	
Hannah McLaren	Delisted	0	0	

==== Expansion club losses ====
Date departed	Player	New club	Ref
27 May 2022	Sarah Dargan	Sydney	

==== Trades ====
Date	Gained	Lost	Trade partner	Ref
31 May	Steph Williams	Ingrid Houtsma	Geelong	
3 June	Pick 30	Pick 18	Hawthorn	
3 June	Pick 33	Pick 18	Hawthorn	
3 June	Pick 25	Pick 30	Collingwood	
3 June	Pick 38	Pick 33	Collingwood	
3 June	Grace Egan	Pick 25	Carlton	
3 June	Libby Graham	Pick 68	Greater Western Sydney	
7 June	Pick 59	Pick 52	Hawthorn	
7 June	Pick 62	Pick 52	Hawthorn	

==== National draft ====
Round	Overall pick	Player	Position	Team from	League from	Ref
2	38	Charley Ryan	Midfielder	Dandenong Stingrays	NAB League	
3	58	Eilish Sheerin	Half back	Inner West Magpies	AFL Sydney	
3	60	Katelyn Cox	Small defender	Hawthorn VFLW	VFL Women's	

=== Signings ===
Date	Player	Club from	League from	Classification	Ref
15 June	Jemima Woods	Western Bulldogs	AFL Women's	Delisted free agent	
20 June	Saraid Taylor	-	-	Rookie (basketball)	
19 August	Amelia Peck	Southern Saints	VFL Women's	Injury replacement (Charley Ryan)	

=== 2022 squad (season seven) ===
Richmond Football Club (AFL Women's)
Senior list		Inactive list	Coaching staff
1 Sophie Molan; 2 Grace Egan; 3 Katie Brennan; 4 Monique Conti; 5 Maddy Brancatisano; 7 Sarah Hosking; 10 Kodi Jacques; 11 Jess Hosking; 12 Sarah D'Arcy; 13 Meagan Kiely; 14 Poppy Kelly; 15 Rebecca Miller; 16 Laura McClelland; 17 Katelyn Cox; 18 Libby Graham	19 Kate Dempsey; 20 Beth Lynch; 22 Ellie McKenzie; 25 Stella Reid; 26 Steph Williams; 27 Emelia Yassir; 28 Gabby Seymour; 29 Jemima Woods; 31 Eilish Sheerin; 34 Saraid Taylor; 35 Maddie Shevlin; 36 Amelia Peck; 37 Tessa Lavey; 38 Meg Macdonald	*21 Charley Ryan; 23 Harriet Cordner	Head coach: Ryan Ferguson; Assistant coaches: Andrew Browne (midfield/stoppages); Lauren Tesoriero (backline); Nathan Chapman (specialist); Emma Grant (development); Legend: (c) Captain(s); (vc) Vice-captain(s)

=== 2022 season (season seven) ===
==== Home and away season ====
Round	Date	Score	Opponent	Opponent's score	Result	Home/away	Venue	Attendance	Ladder (of 18)
1	Sunday 28 August, 4:10pm		Geelong			Away	GMHBA Stadium		
2	Saturday 3 September, 11:40am		Adelaide			Home	Swinburne Centre		
3	Sunday 11 September, 4:10pm		Hawthorn			Home	Swinburne Centre		
4	Sunday 18 September, 2:10pm		Essendon			Away	ETU Stadium		
5	Saturday 24 September, 11:10am		Brisbane			Home	Swinburne Centre		
6	Saturday 1 October, 6:10pm		Gold Coast			Home	Swinburne Centre		
7	Friday 7 October, 5:10pm		West Coast			Away	Mineral Resources Park		
8	Friday 14 October, 6:30pm		Carlton			Away	Ikon Park		
9	Sunday 23 October, 3:10pm		Greater Western Sydney			Home	Mildura Sporting Precinct		
10	TBD		North Melbourne			Away	Arden Street Oval		
