= Woinarski =

Woinarski may refer to:

- Mount Woinarski, Antarctica
- Brian Woinarski (born 1930), Australian rules footballer
- Casimir Zichy-Woinarski (1864–1935), Australian lawyer and judge
- Gertrude Mary Zichy-Woinarski (1874-1955), Australian welfare worker
- John Woinarski (active from 2001), Australian ornithologist
