= Jess Hosking =

Australian rules footballer (born 1995)

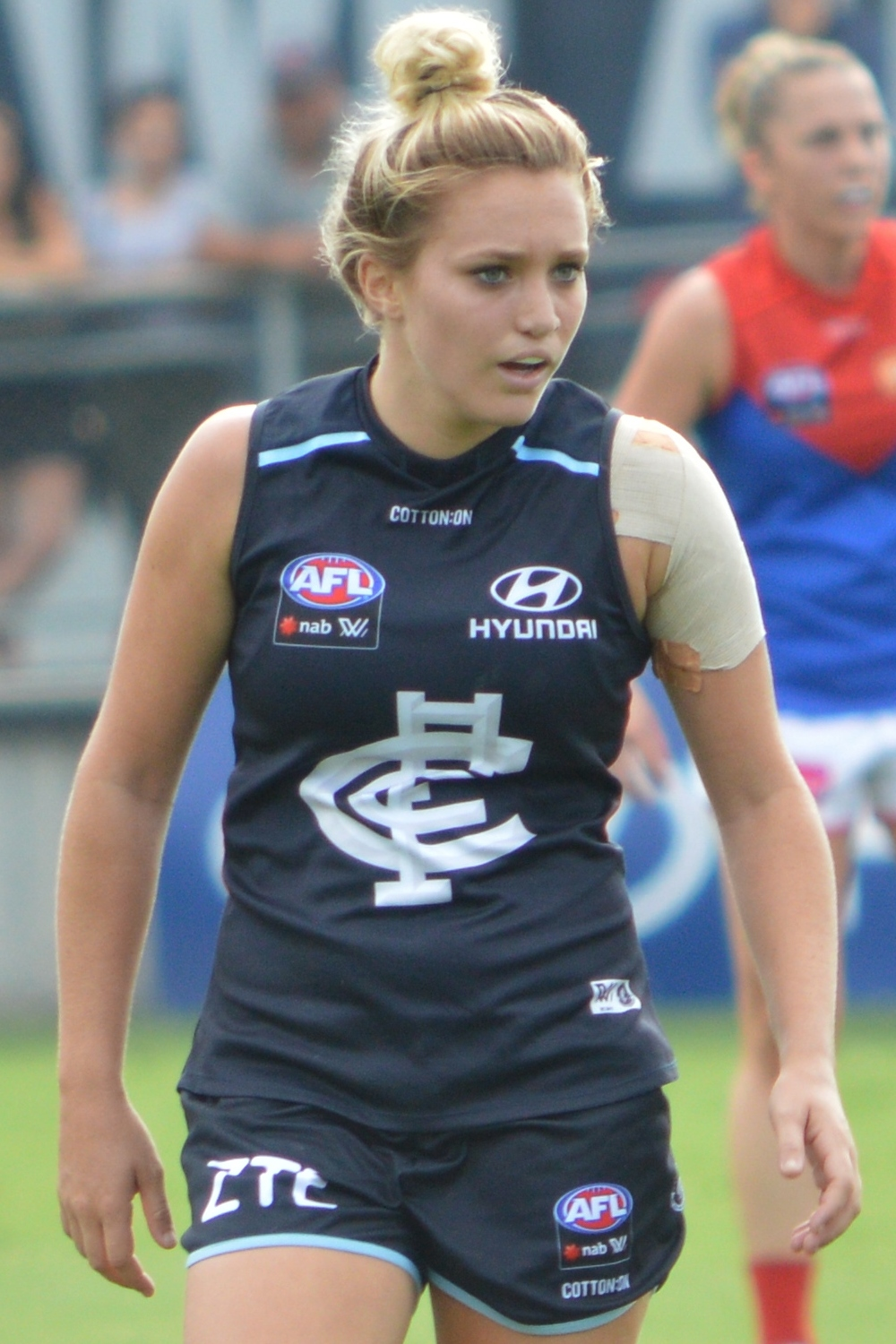
- Hosking playing for Carlton in 2018

Personal information
- Full name: Jessica Hosking
- Born: 2 December 1995 (age 30)
- Original team: Seaford (VFLW)
- Draft: No. 78, 2016 AFL Women's draft
- Debut: Round 1, 2018, Carlton vs. Collingwood, at Ikon Park
- Height: 164 cm (5 ft 5 in)
- Position: Midfielder

Playing career
Years	Club	Games (Goals)
2017–2021	Carlton	30 (1)
2022 (S6)–2023	Richmond	23 (1)
2024–2025	West Coast	8 (4)
Total		61 (6)

Jess Hosking (born 2 December 1995) is a former Australian rules footballer who played in the AFL Women's (AFLW). Hosking played for the Carlton Football Club from 2017 to 2021, the Richmond Football Club from season six to 2023 and the West Coast Eagles from 2024 to 2025.

== Early life ==
Hosking has an identical twin sister, Sarah, who also played for Carlton before being traded to Richmond in 2020. Both sisters grew up on the Mornington Peninsula and played netball, before transitioning to football and playing for Seaford in the VFL Women's (VFLW) in 2016 prior to being drafted to Carlton.

== AFL Women's career ==
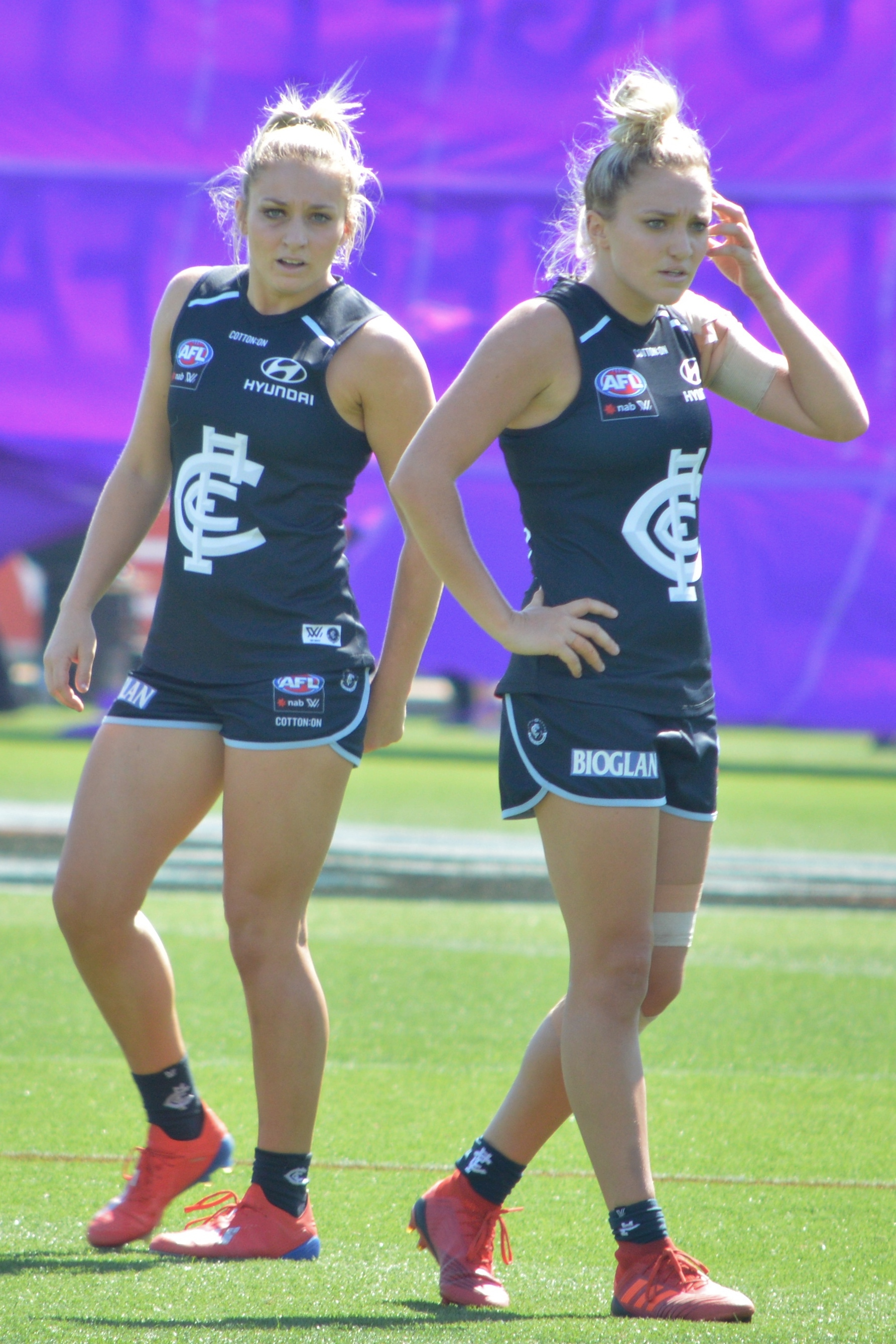
Jess (right) and Sarah Hosking with Carlton in 2019

=== Carlton (2017–2021) ===
Hosking was drafted by Carlton with the 78th selection in the 2016 AFL Women's draft. After missing the entire 2017 season due to an anterior cruciate ligament injury, she made her debut in the eight point win against Collingwood at Ikon Park in the opening round of the 2018 season.

=== Richmond (2022–2023) ===
Hosking requested a trade to Richmond in order to reunite with her sister Sarah in the final stages of the 2021 draft period, on 9 June 2021. She was eventually traded alongside picks 55 and 57 in exchange for picks 23 and 40. Hosking was delisted by Richmond at the end of the 2023 season.

=== West Coast (2024–2025) ===
In December 2023, Hosking signed with West Coast as a delisted free agent, and was later named in West Coast's leadership group leading into her first season at the club in 2024. In week 1, Hosking was among West Coast's best players in its win over her former club Richmond with 15 disposals and two first-half goals, despite having only kicked two goals from her 53 career matches to that point. She was among West Coast's best players in its win over Collingwood in one of week 4's matches with a game-high two goals and nine tackles, but was later ruled out for three to four weeks with a quad strain.

In May 2025, Hosking was absent from the start of pre-season training as she spent time away from the club to deal with a personal issue, and later that month, she announced that she would sit out the 2025 season due to personal reasons. In September, Hosking announced her retirement from football.

== Statistics ==
Legend
G	Goals	K	Kicks	D	Disposals	T	Tackles
B	Behinds	H	Handballs	M	Marks

Season	Team	No.	Games	Totals							Averages (per game)							Votes
Season	Team	No.	Games	G	B	K	H	D	M	T	G	B	K	H	D	M	T	Votes
2017	Carlton	11	0	—	—	—	—	—	—	—	—	—	—	—	—	—	—	0
2018	Carlton	11	6	0	3	32	20	52	5	22	0.0	0.5	5.3	3.3	8.7	0.8	3.7	0
2019	Carlton	11	9	0	0	42	21	63	14	18	0.0	0.0	4.7	2.3	7.0	1.6	2.0	0
2020	Carlton	11	6	0	0	45	21	66	22	22	0.0	0.0	7.5	3.5	11.0	3.7	3.7	0
2021	Carlton	11	9	1	1	62	56	118	25	30	0.1	0.1	6.9	6.2	13.1	2.8	3.3	0
2022 (S6)	Richmond	11	9	0	0	69	32	101	22	25	0.0	0.0	7.7	3.6	11.2	2.4	2.8	0
2022 (S7)	Richmond	11	11	1	1	61	51	112	22	36	0.1	0.1	5.5	4.6	10.2	2.0	3.3	0
2023	Richmond	11	3	0	0	5	5	10	2	7	0.0	0.0	1.7	1.7	3.3	0.7	2.3	0
2024	West Coast	11	8	4	3	42	25	67	16	41	0.5	0.4	5.3	3.1	8.4	2.0	5.1	4
2025	West Coast	11	0	—	—	—	—	—	—	—	—	—	—	—	—	—	—	0
Career			61	6	8	358	231	589	128	201	0.1	0.1	5.9	3.8	9.7	2.1	3.3	4
