= Dylan Grimes =

Australian rules footballer

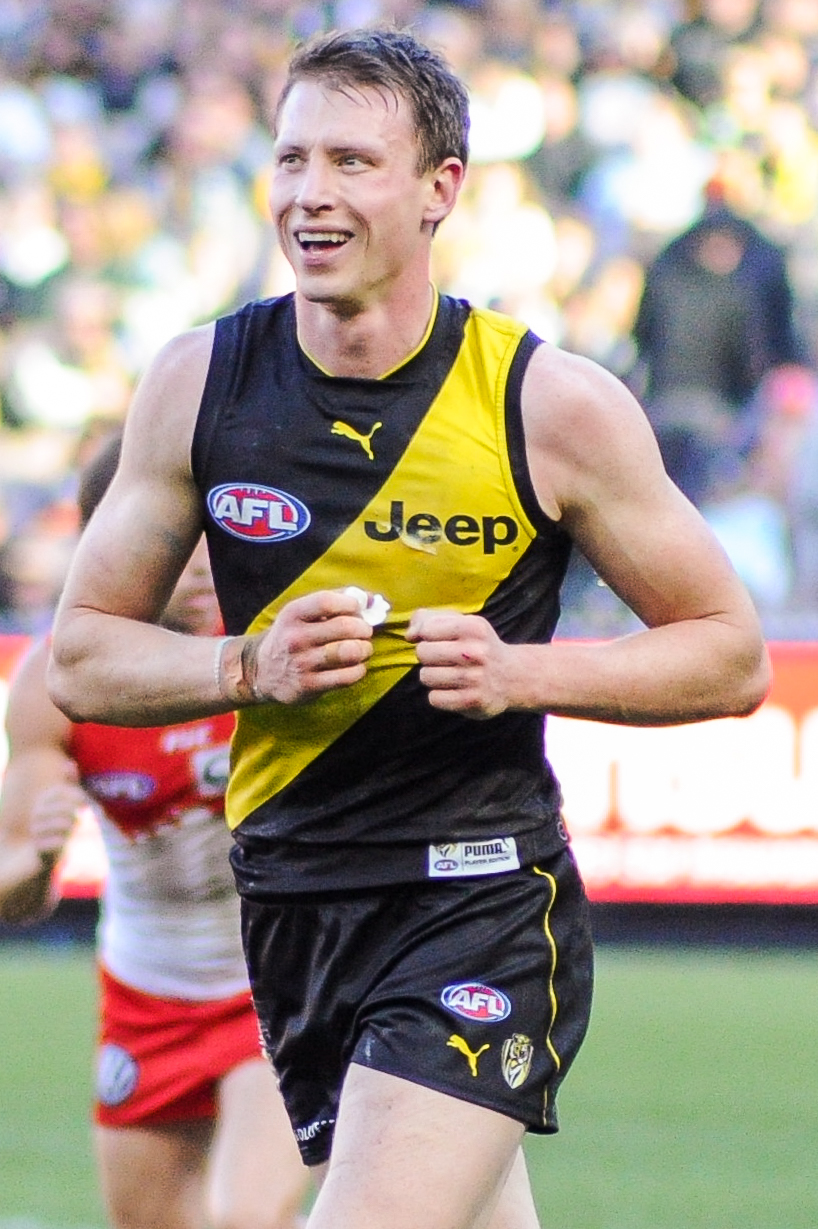
- Grimes playing for Richmond in June 2017

Personal information
- Nickname: Pencil
- Born: 16 July 1991 (age 35)
- Original teams: Northern Knights (TAC Cup); Hurstbridge (NFL)
- Draft: No. 2, 2010 Pre-Season Draft: Richmond
- Debut: Round 22, 2010, Richmond vs. Port Adelaide, at Docklands Stadium
- Height: 193 cm (6 ft 4 in)
- Weight: 90 kg (198 lb)
- Position: Key defender

Playing career
Years	Club	Games (Goals)
2010–2024	Richmond	234 (3)

Career highlights
- AFL: Richmond co-captain: 2022–2023; 3× AFL premiership player: 2017, 2019, 2020; All-Australian team: 2019; Robert Rose Award: 2019; AFL Rising Star nominee: 2012; Richmond: Jack Dyer Medal: 2021; Maurie Fleming Medal (3rd RFC B&F): 2019; 2× Kevin Bartlett Medal (5th RFC B&F): 2017, 2018; 2× Francis Bourke Award (RFC players award): 2017, 2018; Richmond Life Member: 2018

Dylan Grimes (born 16 July 1991) is a former Australian rules footballer who played for the Richmond Football Club in the Australian Football League (AFL). He is a three-time premiership player with the club, winning in 2017, 2019 and 2020. In 2019 he was selected in the All-Australian team and was the recipient of the AFL Players Association's Robert Rose Most Courageous Player Award. Grimes was announced as co-captain alongside Toby Nankervis ahead of the 2022 season.

== Early life and junior football ==
Grimes grew up on a hobby farm in Panton Hill, 32 kilometres north-east of Melbourne. He played junior football at Hurstbridge in the Northern Football League before playing TAC Cup football with the Northern Knights in 2009. He was educated at Diamond Valley College and Loyola College

Grimes went un-drafted in the 2009 AFL National draft despite assurances from Hawthorn and Melbourne that they would select him with third and final round picks, respectively. He was offered the chance to train with Richmond in the following weeks with the expectation that the club would officially select him in the December pre-season draft.

== AFL career ==
=== 2010 season ===
Grimes was drafted by Richmond with the club's first pick and the second selection overall in the 2010 AFL Pre-Season Draft.

He played the majority of his first season at reserves level with Richmond's VFL affiliate team, Coburg. Included in that year were multiple games with Coburg's reserves team, a full two levels below AFL football. Overall his footballing was minimal that year, with an eye injury keeping him from playing most of the season. Grimes eventually made his AFL debut late in 2010, in round 22 against Port Adelaide at Docklands Stadium.

=== 2011 season ===
In 2011 Grimes again started the season playing reserves grade football, this time for the first two matches of the season. However, when fellow defenders Alex Rance and Luke McGuane were ruled out due to suspension in round 3, Grimes was called to take a key defensive role in the Richmond AFL side. In his first match of the season and just his second career match, he recorded 15 spoils, equaling an AFL record at the time. After five rounds he held an average of 13 spoils per game, and the number one ranking in the league. He played in the next four consecutive matches before a severe hamstring injury sustained in round 9's Dreamtime at the 'G match saw Grimes sidelined for the remainer of the 2011 season. At year's end he had played a total of seven matches and held averages of 12.6 disposals and 3.8 marks per game.

=== 2012 season ===
Grimes returned to football fully fit in 2012, playing in the club's round 1 match against Carlton at the MCG. He earned an AFL Rising Star award nomination in round 3, for an 18 disposal and nine mark performance against Melbourne. In round 7 he recorded three career-highs with 13 marks, 24 disposals and six rebound 50s in a match against Sydney. Grimes again suffered a major hamstring injury in the club's round 8 Dreamtime match against Essendon. He missed five weeks of football to rehabilitate the injury, before returning in round 14 to face Adelaide at AAMI Stadium. Despite recording a team-best 10 marks in the match, Grimes re-aggravated the injury and required further treatment as a result. He traveled to Germany soon after to be treated by renowned soft tissue expert Hans-Wilhelm Müller-Wohlfahrt. Part of his treatment involved injections of calf blood extract actovegin directly into the affected muscle together with 200 injections into his lower back over the course of a single week. He did not return to senior football that season, finishing his season with just nine matches played.

=== 2013 season ===
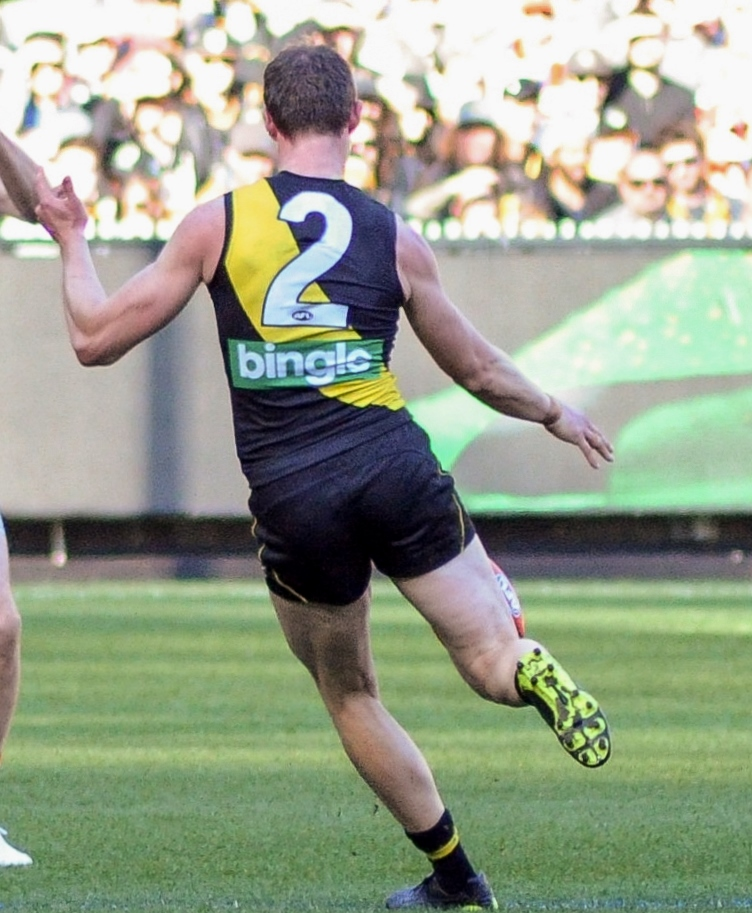
Grimes kicks out of defence

The 2013 pre-season started ominously for Grimes, with the defender failing to travel to the team's pre-season camp in Cairns on account of soreness in his left leg. Later revealed to be a small split in his hamstring tendon, he would again require surgery to repair the damage. Days later he was added to the club's leadership group, serving under newly appointed captain Trent Cotchin. Grimes played his first match of the season in round 2 against St Kilda at the MCG. He played in five consecutive matches before sustaining a foot fracture in round 6 against Geelong. After 15 weeks on the sidelines, Grimes returned to AFL football in round 21. He remained in the side for the final three matches of the home and away season before playing in his first career final, a losing elimination final against Carlton at the MCG.

=== 2014 season ===
Entering 2014 Grimes has shed three kilograms of body mass, adjusting for a change in role from key defender to small defender. Grimes was also left out of the club's leadership group that season. His first match of the season came in the club's re-match with the previous year's finals opponent Carlton, in round 2, 2014 at the MCG. He remained in the club's senior team for the following four matches before being omitted from the side ahead of round 7. Grimes returned to senior football in round 10. He missed a single match in round 12 with a toe injury but otherwise played in every remaining match that season as well as in another elimination final. At season's end he had played a career-best 19 games and placed 11th in the club's best and fairest award.

=== 2015 season ===
Grimes spent part of the 2014/15 pre-season looking for a mental edge, reading extensively about mindfulness in competitive sport and serving as the catalyst for the introduction of a meditation program which when fully implemented two years later would become a key component of the club's success. He completed that pre-season injury free and entered round 1 playing as Richmond's third tall defender. By round 3 he had re-injured his hamstring, sitting out three weeks of football at AFL level as a result. He returned in round 6 against North Melbourne, and this time stayed in the side for 13 consecutive matches. Grimes was subbed out at half time of Richmond's round 19 match with Adelaide, after suffering a minor hamstring strain earlier in the match. He would miss two matches as a result, before returning in round 22 against Essendon at the MCG. At season's end he had played in 18 matches including a losing elimination final. He placed equal ninth in the club's best and fairest award that year, polling votes in 17 of his 18 matches that season.

=== 2016 season ===
By the beginning of 2016 Grimes had established himself as a key member of the club's defensive unit. For the second straight season he would play in rounds 1 and 2 before a hamstring injury would keep him out of round 3 action. What was forecast as a two-week injury turned into a five-week one however, as he did not return to senior football until round 8's match against Sydney. After playing in three consecutive matches Grimes was a late out in round 11, pulling up poorly in the pre-game warm up and causing a late change as a result. The effects were minor however and he would play without trouble the following week. In fact, he played in each of the club's final 11 matches of the season and recorded double digit disposals in all matches and an average of 4.5 marks over the period. Grimes also recorded a career high eight tackles in round 16 against the Western Bulldogs. He placed equal seventh in the club's best and fairest count in what was his best career season to that point.

=== 2017 season ===
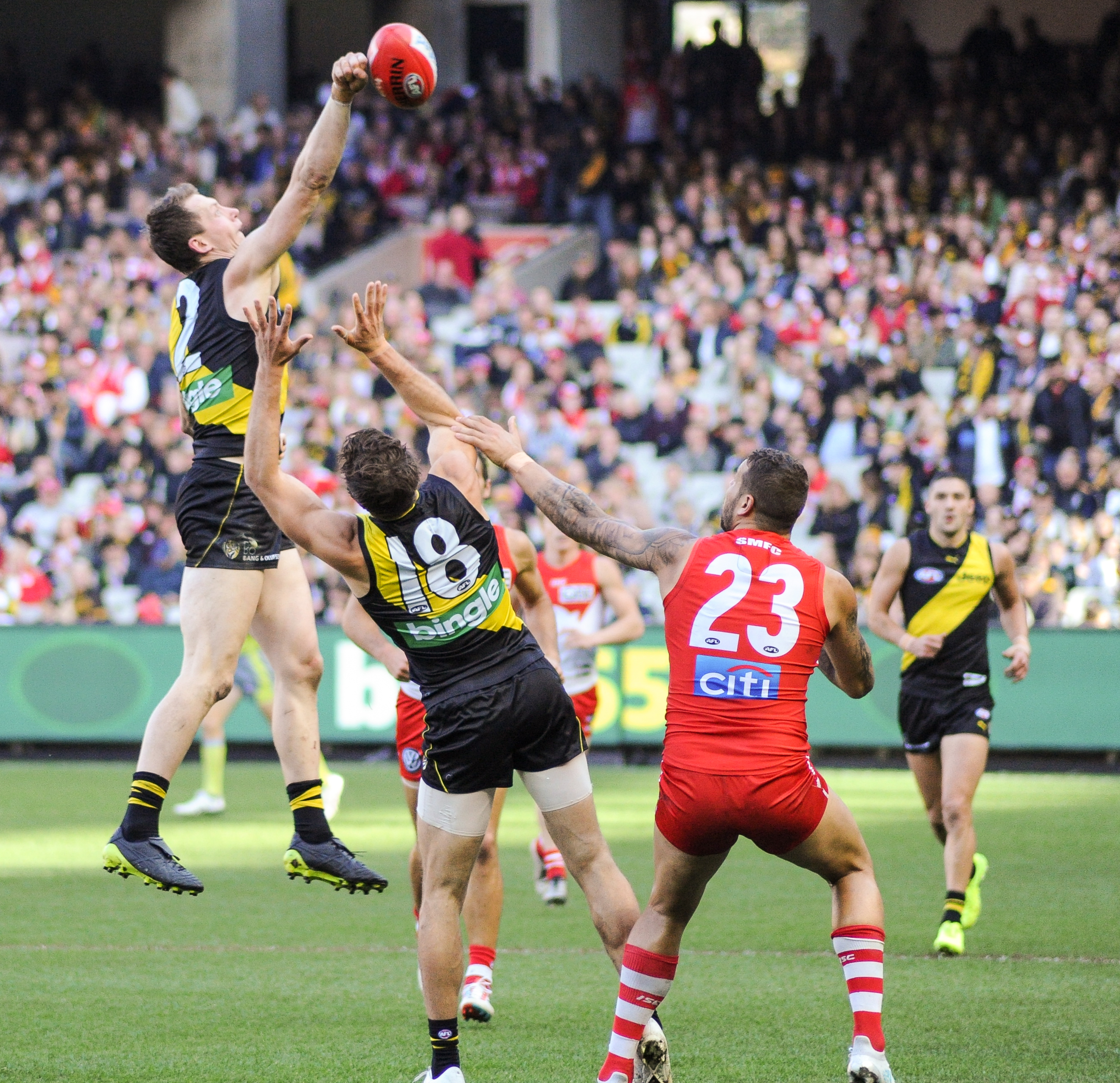
Grimes spoils the ball in defense in round 13, 2017

For the first time in his career, 2017 saw Grimes enter the season injury-free after also having a full and uninterrupted pre-season. He played a key role in the club's round 2 win over Collingwood, blanketing small forward opponent Alex Fasolo and keeping him goalless. Grimes was one of the club's best in round 5 too, recording an equal team-high seven tackles along with six intercepts and eight one percenters and earning himself two votes in the Coaches Association's Player of the Year award. Between rounds 10 and 15 he did not concede a single goal on his direct opponent, a figure that helped contribute to Champion Data ranking Richmond's defence as the fourth best in the competition after 14 rounds. In July Grimes' season was described by The Age's Michael Gleeson as "the best and most consistent" of his career. He finished the home and away season having played all 22 matches for the first time in his career while Richmond qualified for the finals double chance for the first time in 16 years. Grimes and the Richmond defence held Geelong to just five goals in the qualifying final before dispatching of the GWS Giants in a home preliminary final to earn a grand final berth. There they faced the minor premiers Adelaide, who boasted the most effective forward line in the competition that season. It was Grimes' club who would win the day however, as he nullified the Crows' Eddie Betts and became a premiership player in his 104th career match. He was later named in the back pocket in the AFL Media Team of the Finals. He finished the year having recorded the league's sixth best defensive rating among players classed as general defenders and winning the sixth best percentage of defensive one-on-one contests (43 per cent). In Richmond's end of season awards he received the Francis Bourke award as selected by his teammates for most embodying the qualities of awareness, unitedness, relentless and discipline. Grimes was also awarded the Kevin Bartlett medal for a fifth-placed finish in Richmond's best and fairest award and placed third and fourth at the club for one-percenters and intercept possessions respectively.

=== 2018 season ===
On the back of his premiership year, Grimes earned a new three-year contract extension, seeing him secured to Richmond until at least the end of the 2021 season. He had another uninterrupted pre-season, spent mostly working on the offensive side of his game, hoping to contribute more in rebounding out of defensive 50. This did not necessarily carry into the season however, with Grimes' offensive output minimal in the season's early stages. His defensive work was strong though, earning particular praise for a goal-saving effort in round 4 that helped keep the Brisbane Lions to a club-record low score for any match against Richmond. Grimes suffered a bruised back in that match but was largely unaffected by the injury in coming weeks, including when he earned two votes in the Coaches Association's award for a round 7 performance against Fremantle that included 15 disposals, six marks and eight intercepts. He remained in the side for a further two weeks through to round 9's loss to West Coast, where he suffered another knock to the back that eventually saw him a late injury omission in round 10. Grimes would miss just one match with the injury, returning in round 11's Dreamtime at the 'G win over Essendon. He recorded a career-best eight tackles in round 15's win over Sydney before being named by AFL Media as one of Richmond's best with 16 disposals in round 16 that also earned him a place in that organisation's Team of the Week. Grimes followed that up with a season-best eight marks in Richmond's two-point loss to the GWS Giants that also saw him earn a vote in the Coaches Association award. Another three votes came Grimes' way in round 18's win over St Kilda as did a mention in AFL Media's best after round 20's victory over Geelong. In round 22 he recorded a match-high 16 one percenters and earned particular praise from Richmond head coach Damien Hardwick who labelled Grimes "an incredible player". At the end of the home and away season he was named in the 40-man squad for that year's All-Australian team and was nominated for the AFL Players Association's Most Courageous award. In Richmond's victorious qualifying final over Hawthorn, Grimes received the maximum ten votes as both coach's pick for best-on-ground in the AFL Coaches Association award for player of the finals. His finals run would extend just one more match however, when Richmond was eliminated with a shock preliminary final loss to rivals Collingwood. Following the conclusion of the 2018 finals series, Grimes was named by the Herald Sun's chief football writer Mark Robinson as the league's 9th best defender and the 45th best player overall during the 2018 season. Seven Network commentator and Richmond great Matthew Richardson also named Grimes "just about, if not the best one-on-one defender in the competition". He finished the season ranked 13th in the league for one percenters as well as 14th for intercepts. Grimes also earned a second straight Kevin Bartlett Medal for a fifth-placed finish in the club's best and fairest award.

=== 2019 season ===
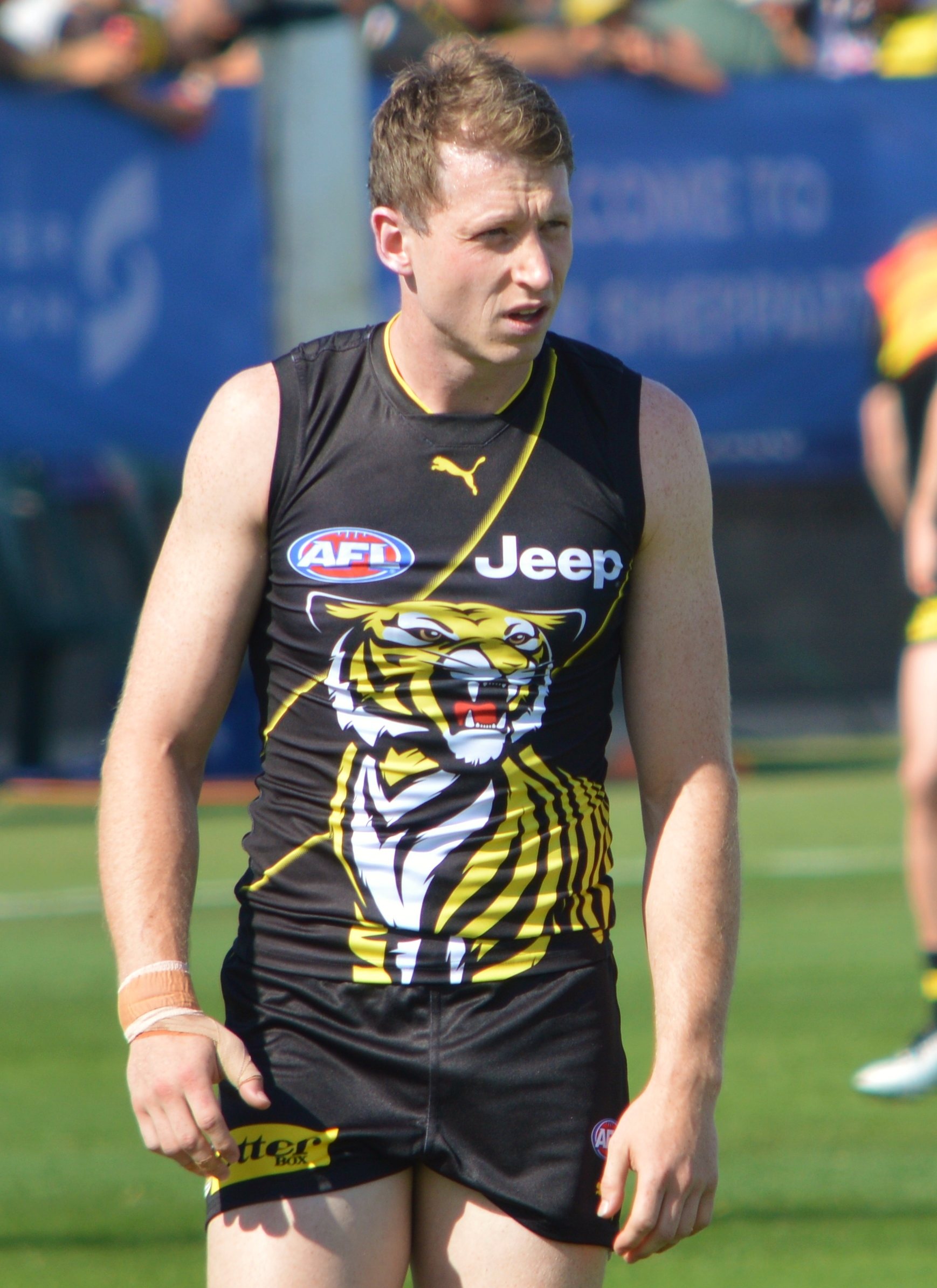
Grimes during the JLT Community Series in March 2019

In the 2018/19 off-season, Grimes underwent minor finger surgery but did not miss any training as a result. In mid-January 2019 he suffered a broken nose during a training session collision with teammate Nathan Broad. Grimes immediately returned to training after surgery to realign the nose, wearing a protective face mask for more than a month while the injury continued to heal. He played in each of the club's two pre-season matches before opening the season with a round 1 win over Carlton. Prior to the match, Grimes had been labelled by Fox Footy commentator Nick Riewoldt as "one of the best lockdown defenders in the competition" and highlighted as one of the league's most irreplaceable players. It was Richmond backline leader and five time All-Australian Alex Rance who would ultimately need to be replaced however, after suffering a torn ACL in that match which would rule him out for the entirety of the season and leave Grimes to lead the club's backline group. In round 2, Grimes received a one match suspension for striking Collingwood forward Jamie Elliott. When he returned in round 4, AFL Media named Grimes a key candidate to captain the side in the absence of all three members of Richmond's leadership group, though he would eventually be passed over for the role in favour of veteran Shane Edwards. He led in another way, taking six marks in the final quarter in a best-on-ground performance that earned him his first three Brownlow Medal votes and that senior coach Damien Hardwick said "won the match for (Richmond)". Following that match, AFL Media labelled Grimes the best one-on-one defender in the league and that he had taken the mantle of the league's best defender from the injured Rance. He picked up two votes in the coaches association player of the year award in round 6 before adding more votes in three consecutive matches between round 8 and 10. In that round 8 win over Fremantle, Grimes gathered a career-best 26 disposals. Halfway through the year, Grimes was named in ESPN's mid-year All-Australian team and named by Fox Footy as a contender for the end of year honour. In round 18, Grimes earned two coaches votes for a performance in a win over Port Adelaide that also saw him named to AFL Media's Team of the Week. He was again named in that team the following week but did so along with best on ground honours with nine coaches votes in round 19's win over Collingwood. For that effort which included an equal career-high six intercept marks, Grimes was labelled by the Herald Sun as a likely All-Australian selection. In the five matches between the bye and that point, Grimes had lost just two of 21 one-on-one contests, while averaging a loss percentage of 16.4 across the length of the season. He was also picked by 3AW commentator Matthew Lloyd as the best key position defender in the league. During a match against West Coast in round 22, Grimes left the field with an ankle injury after landing awkwardly in a marking contest. He ultimately played out the match and despite some limited training during the week that followed, lined up in round 23's win over the Brisbane Lions where he restricted Charlie Cameron to just seven disposals and earned another selection to AFL Media's team of the week. Grimes concluded the regular season ranked 10th in the league for one percenters and 12th for intercepts, earning selection in The Age and the Herald Suns teams of the year. He earned an official honour with selection to the All-Australian team for the first time and was voted by the players association as the league's most courageous player. After nine straight wins to finish the home and away season, Grimes was set for another contest directly opposed to Charlie Cameron in a qualifying final against the Brisbane Lions at The Gabba. He produced a "dominant performance" to restrict Cameron to a single goal, helping Richmond win through to a home preliminary final against Geelong. Grimes received four coaches votes as the third best player on the ground during the qualifying final, but was also fined $1000 by the league for staging for a free kick when pushed by an opposition player in an off-the-ball incident in the first half of that win. In the preliminary final, Grimes was reliable in defence and helped his side through to a second grand final appearance in three seasons. In the grand final, Grimes held Coleman Medalist Jeremy Cameron to a single goal, and was part of the Richmond defence that kept the Giants to 25 points, their lowest score in the club's eight-year history and the lowest score by any team in a VFL/AFL grand final since 1960. Grimes finished what AFL Media called "a career-defining year" by winning a second AFL premiership and placing third in the club's best and fairest count, his best finish to date. He was also named as the league's best defender and 20th best player overall in the Herald Sun chief football reporter Mark Robinson's list of the league's best players in 2019.

=== 2020 season ===
Grimes had minor wrist surgery in the 2019/20 off-season, missing just 10 days of training in late November for the recovery. In mid-December, teammate Alex Rance announced a shock retirement, reconfirming Grimes' place as the club's premier defender following his outstanding 2019 season played in Rance's injury-absence. Grimes was labelled by Fox Footy as an unlikely non-selection to the Victorian State of Origin side in late February, with Grimes instead featuring in each of Richmond's two pre-season matches. Grimes then contributed five marks in round 1's win over Carlton in a match played under extraordinary conditions, the first of what had been announced would be a shortened 17-round season imposed on the league as a result of the rapid progression of the coronavirus pandemic into Australia. Due to public health prohibitions on large gatherings, matches that season were to be played without crowds in attendance and with quarter lengths reduced by one fifth in order to reduce the physical load on players who would be expected to play multiple matches with short breaks in the second half of the year owing to the likelihood of an extended break in play that season. Within three days of the round 1 win however, the AFL Commission suspended the season for an indefinite period after multiple states enforced quarantine conditions on their borders. After an 11-week hiatus, Grimes contributed 10 disposals in a round 2 draw with Collingwood in early-June. In early July, Grimes traveled with the club when all Victorian sides were relocated to the Gold Coast in response to a virus outbreak in Melbourne. He was among Richmond's best players in a round 7 win over North Melbourne two weeks into that stay, attracting six coaches award votes for a performance that included game highs in marks (nine) and one-percenters (nine). Following round 9's win over the Western Bulldogs, Grimes was named in the backline of The Age's mid-year All-Australian team. In round 13's Dreamtime in Darwin match, Grimes was charged by the AFL's match review officer with allegedly staging for a free kick. Grimes appealed the charge to the AFL Tribunal later that week and was subsequently cleared, though he would be subjected to harassment on social media that ultimately led to criminal charges being laid against two members of the public. In the second quarter of round 14's win over West Coast, Grimes suffered a minor hamstring injury that resulted in him sitting out the remainder of the match. He resumed running exercises within two days of the injury but missed the club's round 15 match against Fremantle, before returning in the club's next match after a round 16 bye. He was equal best afield in that win over Geelong, earning nine coaches votes for a performance that included 12 intercepts and six marks. At the conclusion of the regular season, Grimes was nominated to the All-Australian squad of forty players for a third successive season. Though he was named in The Age's mock team, Grimes was overlooked for final selection in the official All-Australian team. Grimes was below his best in the club's qualifying final loss to the Brisbane Lions, but was solid with a five mark performance in a semi-final victory over St Kilda one week later. He contributed four intercepts in a nail-biting win over Port Adelaide in the preliminary final, helping Richmond through to a Grand Final matchup with Geelong. He became a three-time premiership player in that 31-point grand final victory, playing a lockdown defensive role and keeping opposition small forward Gary Rohan goalless. Grimes concluded the premiership-winning season having played 20 matches, while placing seventh in the club's best and fairest award.

=== Post-premiership career ===
Ahead of the 2021 season, Grimes was labelled by the Herald Sun as the third best defender in the league and the 21st best player overall. He played in Richmond's pre-season matches in late-February and early-March before featuring in the club's round 1 match against Carlton. After recording eight marks against Hawthorn in round 2, Grimes was labelled as one of the best 10 players in the league by 1116 SEN commentator Garry Lyon. He suffered a match-ending ankle injury in the last quarter of round 6's match against Melbourne, but made a speedy recovery to play in round 7's win over the Western Bulldogs. Grimes suffered a delayed concussion in the week that followed, despite playing the entirety of that match and with no apparent causal incident. He was ruled out for one week as a result of the concussion, and made a return in the club's round 9 win over Greater Western Sydney. Grimes proved instrumental in the victory, recording an equal game-high eight intercepts and performing a goal-line save to negate a potentially match-winning Giants shot at goal in the final minute of the match. For this performance, Grimes earned a Brownlow Medal vote, taking his career Brownlow vote total to 4 votes.

Grimes announced his retirement in August of 2024. His 15-year career finished with 234 games.

== Player profile ==
Grimes plays as a lock-down defender, capable of directly matching up on tall and small forwards. He is notable for the foot-speed to contain small opponents and the spoiling prowess to effectively defend key position forwards. After previously being described by Richmond head coach Damien Hardwick as the Robin to teammate and five-time All-Australian Alex Rance's Batman, Grimes ascended to become one of the league's best defenders with Rance's knee injury and subsequent retirement in 2019.

Ahead of the 2020 season, Grimes was named by the Herald Sun as Richmond's 11th best player of the AFL era. At the end of the year he was named the third best defender and 16th best player overall in the Herald Sun's list of the best players of the 2020 season.

== Statistics ==
Legend
G	Goals	K	Kicks	D	Disposals	T	Tackles
B	Behinds	H	Handballs	M	Marks
#	Played in that season's premiership team

Season	Team	No.	Games	Totals							Averages (per game)							Votes
Season	Team	No.	Games	G	B	K	H	D	M	T	G	B	K	H	D	M	T	Votes
2010	Richmond	48	1	0	0	2	3	5	1	0	0.0	0.0	2.0	3.0	5.0	1.0	0.0	0
2011	Richmond	48	7	0	0	35	51	86	27	12	0.0	0.0	5.0	7.3	12.3	3.9	1.7	0
2012	Richmond	2	9	0	0	93	52	145	67	14	0.0	0.0	10.3	5.8	16.1	7.4	1.6	0
2013	Richmond	2	9	0	0	58	31	89	34	15	0.0	0.0	6.4	3.4	9.9	3.8	1.7	0
2014	Richmond	2	19	1	1	104	83	187	61	53	0.1	0.1	5.5	4.4	9.8	3.2	2.8	0
2015	Richmond	2	18	1	0	107	89	196	52	30	0.1	0.0	5.9	4.9	10.9	2.9	1.7	0
2016	Richmond	2	16	0	0	97	104	201	64	41	0.0	0.0	6.1	6.5	12.6	4.0	2.6	0
2017^{#}	Richmond	2	25	1	2	126	138	264	72	76	0.0	0.1	5.0	5.5	10.6	2.9	3.0	0
2018	Richmond	2	23	0	0	146	118	264	73	82	0.0	0.0	6.3	5.1	11.5	3.2	3.6	0
2019^{#}	Richmond	2	24	0	0	172	138	310	129	52	0.0	0.0	7.2	5.8	12.9	5.4	2.2	3
2020^{#}	Richmond	2	20	0	1	126	71	197	78	35	0.0	0.1	6.3	3.6	9.9	3.9	1.8	0
2021	Richmond	2	21	0	0	159	127	286	118	47	0.0	0.0	7.6	6.0	13.6	5.6	2.2	1
2022	Richmond	2	15	0	0	106	59	165	52	23	0.0	0.0	7.1	3.9	11.0	3.5	1.5	0
2023	Richmond	2	22	0	0	121	77	198	52	48	0.0	0.0	5.5	3.5	9.0	2.4	2.2	0
2024	Richmond	2	5	0	1	24	18	42	18	2	0.0	0.2	4.8	3.6	8.4	3.6	0.4	0
Career			234	3	5	1476	1159	2635	898	530	0.0	0.0	6.3	5.0	11.3	3.8	2.3	4

== Honours and achievements ==
Team

- 3× AFL premiership player (Richmond): 2017, 2019, 2020
- McClelland Trophy (Richmond): 2018

Individual

- All-Australian: 2019
- AFLPA Robert Rose Most Courageous Player Award: 2019
- Maurie Fleming Medal (3rd place, Richmond B&F): 2019
- 2× Kevin Bartlett Medal (5th place, Richmond B&F): 2017, 2018
- All-Australian squad nominee: 2018, 2020
- AFL Rising Star nominee: 2012
- 2× Francis Bourke Award (RFC players award): 2017, 2018

== Personal life ==
Outside of football, Grimes and his wife Elisha are owners of a winery north of Melbourne. The pair were married at a ceremony on the winery grounds in November 2019.

He is the younger brother of former Melbourne captain Jack Grimes.

=== 2020 harassment and stalking incident ===
In August 2020, Grimes was subjected to online abuse and harassment after he allegedly staged for a free kick in the round 13 Dreamtime in Darwin match. Though the staging charge initially laid by the AFL match review officer was later overturned on appeal to the AFL Tribunal, Grimes received a significant number of threatening messages from members of the public in relation to the incident. The day after the game, Grimes posted screenshots of abusive messages to his Instagram account demonstrating death threats received over the previous night. Victoria Police subsequently launched an investigation into the messages, resulting in charges being laid on two separate individuals within one week. The first, a 39-year-old man from Frankston, was charged with stalking, using a telecommunications device to menace and making a threat to commit sexual offences among other charges, while a 54-year-old man from Mitcham was charged two days later with stalking and using a telecommunications device to menace. The former charge will be heard in August 2021 and the later man avoided conviction at the Ringwood Magistrates Court in December 2020, on the condition he write a letter of genuine apology to Grimes, donate $1000 to The Alannah and Madeline Foundation and accepted a six-month good behaviour bond.
