= Beth Lynch =

Australian rules footballer

Bethany Lynch

Personal information
- Full name: Bethany May Lynch
- Born: 19 May 1997 (age 29)
- Original team: Richmond (VFLW)
- Debut: Round 4, 2019, North Melbourne vs. Melbourne, at Casey Fields
- Height: 173 cm (5 ft 8 in)
- Position: Utility

Club information
- Current club: Richmond
- Number: 20

Playing career^{1}
Years	Club	Games (Goals)
2019–2021	North Melbourne	8 (2)
2022–	Richmond	31 (1)
Total		39 (3)
- ^{1} Playing statistics correct to the end of the 2023 season.

Bethany May Lynch (born 19 May 1997) is an Australian rules footballer who plays for Richmond in the AFL Women's competition (AFL). She has previously played for North Melbourne.

== AFLW career ==
Lynch played for Richmond in the VFL Women's (VFLW) competition before she was rookie listed by North Melbourne for their AFL Women's (AFLW) list following the 2018 AFL Women's draft. She made her debut in a four-point victory over Melbourne in the fourth round of the 2019 season. After playing eight games for the club, she was delisted in June 2021.

In December 2021, Lynch joined Richmond's primary AFLW list, after Iilish Ross was placed on the inactive list due to injury.

== Personal life ==
She is the sister of Richmond player, Tom Lynch.
