= Sarah Hosking =

Australian rules footballer (born 1995)

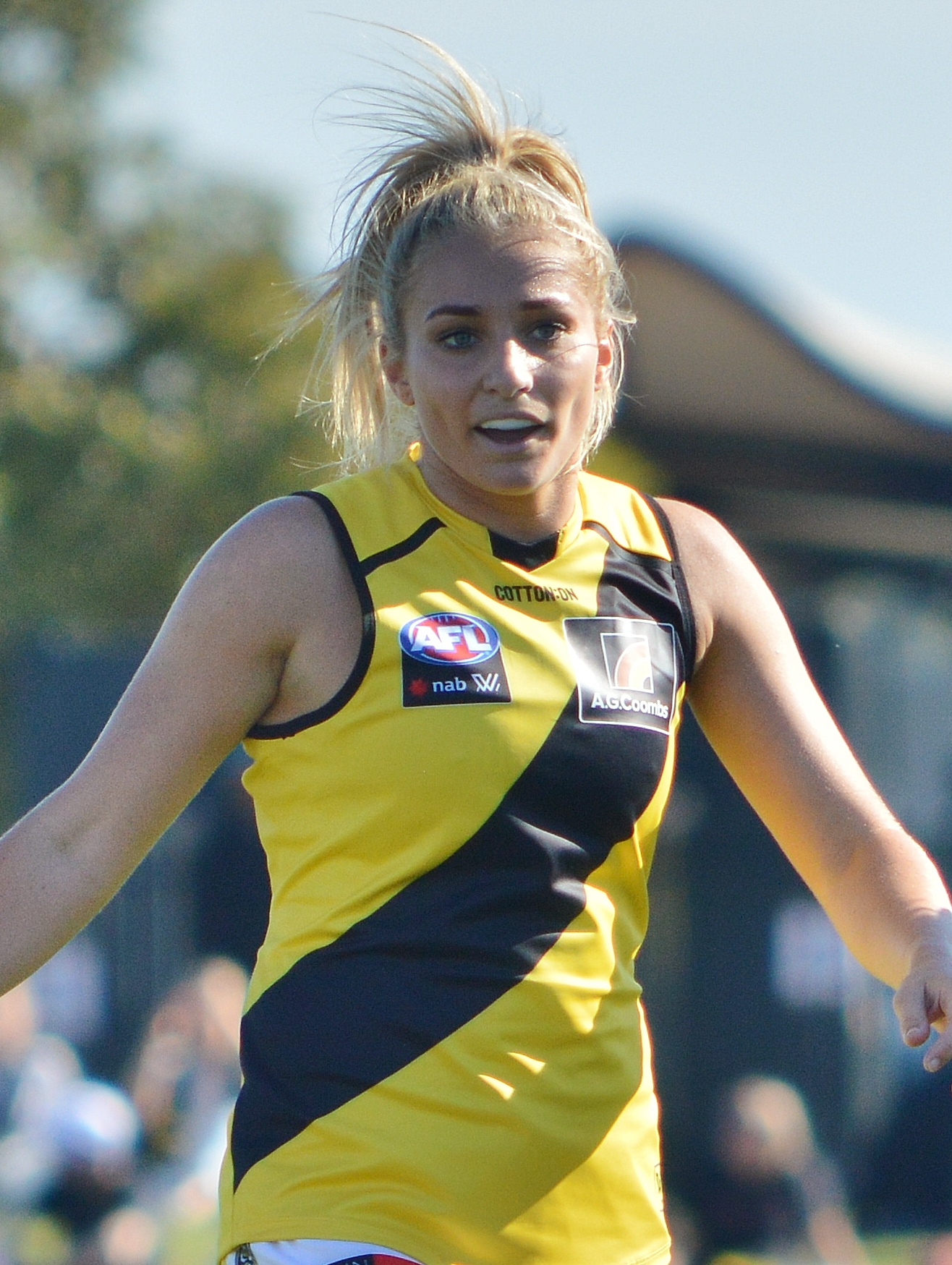
- Hosking with Richmond in February 2021

Personal information
- Full name: Sarah Hosking
- Born: 2 December 1995 (age 30)
- Original team: Seaford (VFLW)
- Draft: No. 19, 2016 national draft
- Debut: Round 1, 2017, Carlton vs. Collingwood, at Ikon Park
- Height: 164 cm (5 ft 5 in)
- Position: Midfielder

Club information
- Current club: Richmond
- Number: 7

Playing career^{1}
Years	Club	Games (Goals)
2017–2020	Carlton	30 (5)
2021–	Richmond	33 (3)
Total		63 (8)

Representative team honours^{2}
Years	Team	Games (Goals)
2017	Victoria	1 (0)
- ^{1} Playing statistics correct to the end of the 2023 season.^{2} Representative statistics correct as of 2017.

Sarah Hosking (born 2 December 1995) is an Australian rules footballer with the Richmond Football Club in the AFL Women's (AFLW). She previously played for the Carlton Football Club from 2017 to 2020. Hosking represented Victoria in the inaugural AFL Women's State of Origin match in 2017, and is the identical twin sister of Jess Hosking, who is a former AFLW player and was her teammate in Richmond from 2022(S6) to 2023.

== Early life ==
Hosking was born a minute earlier than her twin sister Jess. Both formerly played netball in their youth and were playing for Seaford in the VFL Women's (VFLW) prior to being drafted.

== AFL Women's career ==
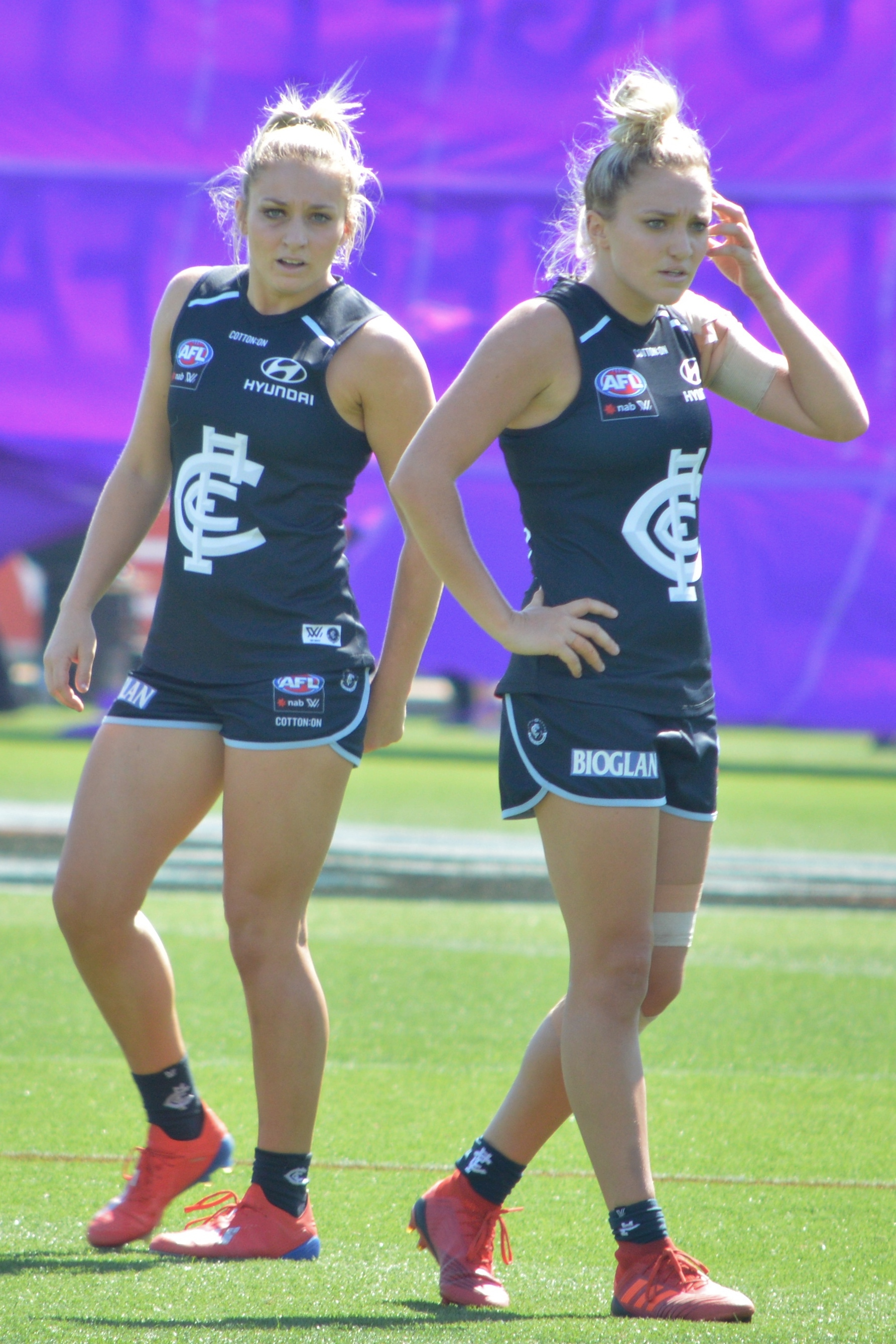
Sarah (left) and Jess Hosking with Carlton in 2019

=== Carlton (2017–2020) ===
Hosking was drafted by Carlton with the club's third selection and nineteenth overall in the 2016 AFL Women's draft. She made her debut in the inaugural AFL Women's match against Collingwood at Ikon Park while her sister Jess missed the inaugural season with a left anterior cruciate ligament injury, making her debut in the corresponding match the following year. On 2 September 2017, Hosking played for Victoria in the inaugural AFL Women's State of Origin match.

In 2018, Hosking recorded a then-league record 16 tackles in Carlton's round 2 win against Greater Western Sydney in heavy rain. Her record was broken two weeks later when Adelaide's Ebony Marinoff recorded 21 tackles, a national senior-level record, in similar conditions against the same opponent in round 4.

=== Richmond (2021–present) ===
In August 2020, Hosking was traded to Richmond for an end-of-first-round draft selection.

== Statistics ==
Statistics are correct to the end of round 4, 2023.

Legend
G	Goals	K	Kicks	D	Disposals	T	Tackles
B	Behinds	H	Handballs	M	Marks

Season	Team	No.	Games	Totals							Averages (per game)							Votes
Season	Team	No.	Games	G	B	K	H	D	M	T	G	B	K	H	D	M	T	Votes
2017	Carlton	10	7	2	0	35	28	63	11	17	0.3	0.0	5.0	4.0	9.0	1.6	2.4	0
2018	Carlton	10	7	0	1	45	39	84	12	40	0.0	0.1	6.4	5.6	12.0	1.7	5.7	1
2019	Carlton	10	9	1	2	55	32	87	19	27	0.1	0.2	6.1	3.6	9.7	2.1	3.0	3
2020	Carlton	10	7	2	1	51	31	82	18	22	0.3	0.1	7.3	4.4	11.7	2.6	3.1	0
2021	Richmond	7	9	1	3	73	56	129	31	38	0.1	0.3	8.1	6.2	14.3	3.4	4.2	0
2022 (S6)	Richmond	7	9	0	3	56	60	116	16	46	0.0	0.3	6.2	6.7	12.9	1.8	5.1	
2022 (S7)	Richmond	7	7	1	1	59	50	109	20	38	0.1	0.1	6.7	8.4	7.1	2.9	5.4	
2023	Richmond	7	3	0	0	19	13	32	7	9	0.0	0.0	6.3	4.3	10.6	2.3	3.0	
Career			58	7	11	393	309	702	134	235	0.1	0.2	6.8	5.3	12.1	2.3	4.1	4

== Honours and achievements ==
Individual

- Victoria representative honours in AFL Women's State of Origin: 2017
