= Jacob Bauer =

Australian rules footballer

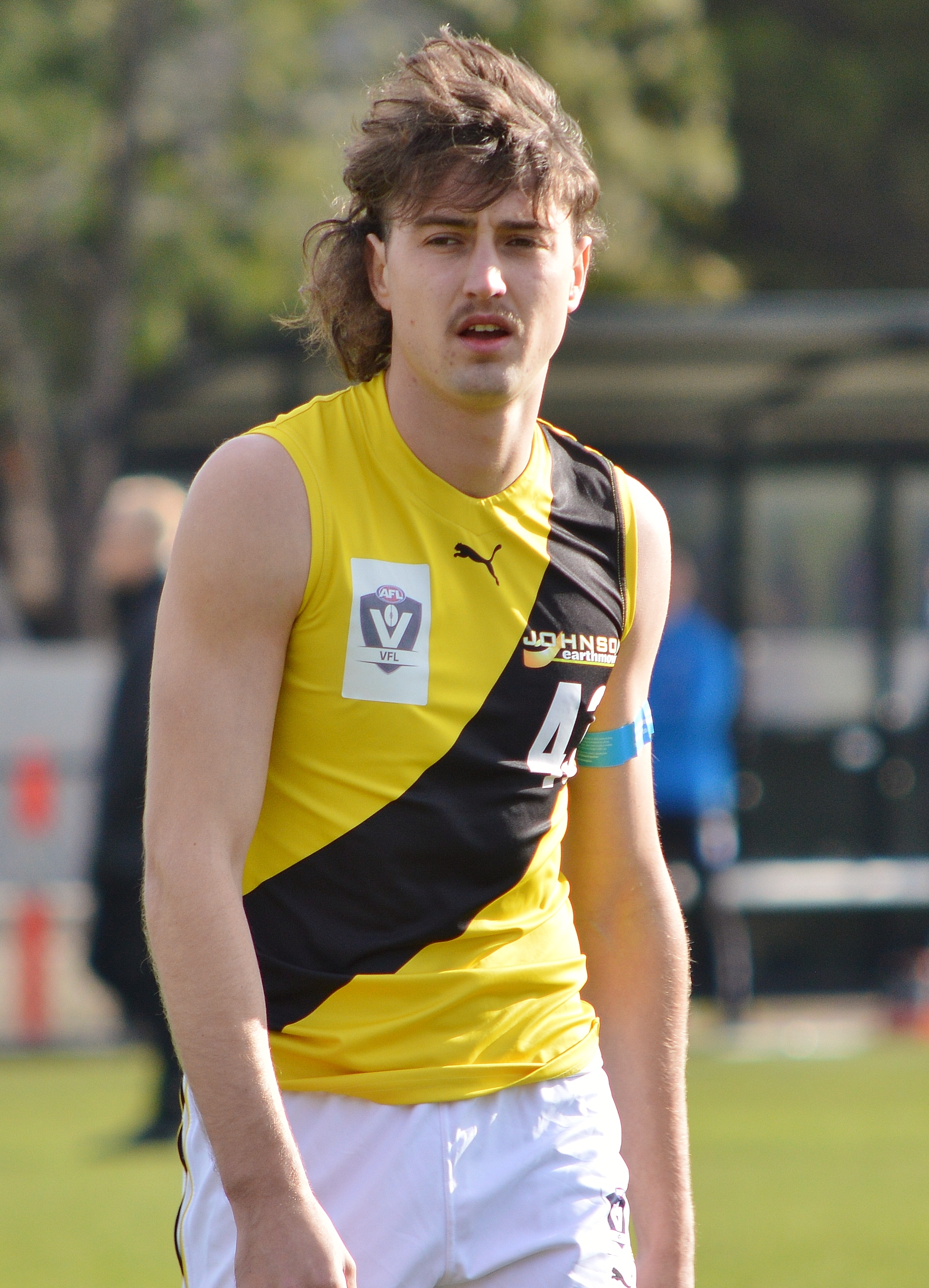
- Bauer with Richmond's VFL team in July 2022

Personal information
- Full name: Jacob Andrew Bauer
- Nickname: Bowser
- Born: 4 June 2002 (age 24)
- Original team: North Adelaide
- Draft: No. 10, 2022 mid-season draft: Richmond
- Debut: Round 17, 2023, Richmond vs. Sydney, at MCG
- Height: 192 cm (6 ft 4 in)
- Weight: 86 kg (190 lb)
- Position: Key forward

Playing career
Years	Club	Games (Goals)
2022–2025	Richmond	12 (11)

Jacob Andrew Bauer (born 4 June 2002) is a former professional Australian rules footballer who played for the Richmond Football Club in the Australian Football League (AFL). Bauer was drafted by Richmond with the 10th pick in the 2022 mid-season draft and made his AFL debut in round 17 of the 2023 season.

== Career ==
Bauer is from South Western Sydney. Bauer's junior football was played with the Under 12s with the Wollondilly Redbacks until U12s, U17 with the Western Suburbs and Inner West Magpies in the Sydney AFL. Bauer was a member of the Sydney Swans Academy. After going undrafted in the AFL national draft, he began the 2022 season playing for North Adelaide in the SANFL. He was then drafted by Richmond with the club's first pick and the 10th selection overall in the 2022 mid-season draft.

Bauer played the next year for the Richmond reserves, notably kicking after-the-siren game winning goals in two separate matches during June 2023. He made his senior debut for Richmond in round 17 of the 2023 season, but suffered a match-ending hamstring injury less than two minutes into the game substituted of. After rehabilitating, he returned the senior team in round 21.

Midway through the 2025 season, Bauer suffered an anterior cruciate ligament (ACL) injury while playing for Richmond's reserves team in the Victorian Football League (VFL), which prematurely ended his season. After 12 games over 3 and a half seasons on the playing list, Bauer was delisted by Richmond at the end of the season.

== Statistics ==
Legend
G	Goals	K	Kicks	D	Disposals	T	Tackles
B	Behinds	H	Handballs	M	Marks

Season	Team	No.	Games	Totals							Averages (per game)							Votes
Season	Team	No.	Games	G	B	K	H	D	M	T	G	B	K	H	D	M	T	Votes
2023	Richmond	43	4	4	0	14	4	18	8	2	1.0	0.0	3.5	1.0	4.5	2.0	0.5	0
2024	Richmond	43	3	4	2	18	9	27	9	2	1.3	0.7	6.0	3.0	9.0	3.0	0.7	0
2025	Richmond	43	5	3	3	16	10	26	11	4	0.6	0.6	3.2	2.0	5.2	2.2	0.8	0
Career			12	11	5	48	23	71	28	8	0.9	0.4	4.0	1.9	5.9	2.3	0.7	0
