= Gertrude Zichy-Woinarski =

Australian welfare worker

Gertrude Mary Zichy-Woinarski MBE (née Brind; 2 March 1874 – 4 November 1955) was an Australian welfare worker. She was made a Member of the Order of the British Empire (MBE) in the 1954 Birthday Honours "for distinguished services to many charitable organisations."

At age 26, she was elected a member of the Melbourne Ladies' Benevolent Society Gertrude became a 'district visitor' in North Melbourne. In August 1913, she was elected a vice-president of the society.

Zichy-Woinarski was born in Ballarat, Victoria to English-born parents, Henry Brind and his wife, Hester Bennet (née Goodfellow). She married Victor Joseph Emanuel Zichy-Woinarski in 1895, with whom she had four children. She died in Mordialloc, Melbourne, Victoria, aged 81.

== See also ==
- George Michael Prendergast
