= Andrew Browne (footballer, born 1990) =

Australian rules footballer

Personal information
- Full name: Andrew Browne
- Born: 7 July 1990 (age 36)
- Original teams: Murray Bushrangers, TAC Cup
- Height: 203 cm (6 ft 8 in)
- Weight: 104 kg (229 lb)
- Position: Ruckman

Playing career^{1}
Years	Club	Games (Goals)
2009–2012	Richmond	12 (2)
- ^{1} Playing statistics correct to the end of 2012.

Career highlights
- 2008 TAC Cup Premiership (Murray Bushrangers)

Andrew L. Browne (born 7 July 1990) is an Australian rules football player in the Australian Football League, who played for the Richmond Football Club.

Browne was drafted from the Murray Bushrangers in the TAC Cup by Richmond in the 2009 Rookie draft using pick 39. Originally from Mansfield, Victoria, he was a surprise selection in the opening round of the 2009 AFL season after playing only two games during the preseason. He represented Victoria Country in the 2008 AFL Under 18 Championships and played in the Bushrangers' 2008 TAC Cup premiership winning side.

After the completion of the 2012 season Richmond officially announced Browne's delisting from its senior list.
