= Poppy Kelly =

Australian rules footballer

Personal information
- Full name: Poppy Kelly
- Born: 10 December 1998 (age 27)
- Original team: Southern Saints (VFLW)
- Draft: 2019 rookie signing
- Debut: Round 4, 2020, St Kilda vs. Fremantle, at RSEA Park
- Height: 184 cm (6 ft 0 in)
- Position: Ruck

Club information
- Current club: Richmond
- Number: 14

Playing career^{1}
Years	Club	Games (Goals)
2020–2021	St Kilda	6 (0)
2022 (S6)–	Richmond	22 (1)
Total		28 (1)
- ^{1} Playing statistics correct to the end of the 2023 season.

Poppy Kelly (born 10 December 1998) is an Australian rules footballer who plays for Richmond in the AFL Women's (AFLW). She has previously played for St Kilda.

== AFLW career ==
=== St Kilda ===
Kelly joined St Kilda for their inaugural season in the 2020 AFL Women's season.

=== Richmond ===
After two seasons at St Kilda, Kelly was traded to Richmond in exchange for pick no. 48 ahead of 2022 AFL Women's season 6.

== Statistics ==
Statistics are correct to round 3, 2022 (S6)

Legend
G	Goals	K	Kicks	D	Disposals	T	Tackles
B	Behinds	H	Handballs	M	Marks

Season	Team	No.	Games	Totals							Averages (per game)						
Season	Team	No.	Games	G	B	K	H	D	M	T	G	B	K	H	D	M	T
2020	St Kilda	16	3	0	0	12	15	27	5	8	0.0	0.0	4.0	5.0	9.0	1.7	2.7
2021	St Kilda	16	3	0	0	2	18	20	1	13	0.0	0.0	0.7	6.0	6.7	0.3	4.3
2022 (S6)	Richmond	14	1	0	0	2	3	5	2	1	0.0	0.0	2.0	3.0	5.0	2.0	1.0
Career			7	0	0	16	36	52	8	22	0.0	0.0	2.3	5.1	7.4	1.1	3.1
