= Seaford Football Club =

Seaford

Names
- Full name: Seaford Football Netball Club
- Nickname: Tigers

Club details
- Founded: 1921; 105 years ago
- Colours: Black Yellow
- Competition: MPNFL: Senior men SEWF: Senior women
- Premierships: (13): 1924, 1926, 1927, 1934, 1951, 1954, 1956, 1970, 1981, 1985, 2007, 2008, 2009
- Ground: R.F. Miles Reserve

Uniforms
Home

Other information
- Official website: seafordfnc.teamapp.com

The Seaford Football Netball Club, nicknamed the Tigers, is an Australian rules football and netball club based in the south eastern region of Australia, first organised in late 1921. Formation meetings were held at Armstrong's Grocery Store, Martins Garage and Weatherley's Milk Bar.

The football team currently competes in the Mornington Peninsula Nepean Football League. The netball department began at the club in 2011. The club also introduced women's football in 2013.

At end of the 2016 season, Seaford FNC fielded three men's, four netball and three women's football sides.

The highest profile player to come out of Seaford is retired St Kilda player and Brownlow Medallist Robert Harvey.

At the end of the 2018, Seaford FNC came last in the newly created First Division of MPNFL, finishing with 2 wins, 14 losses and 2 draws, and therefore were relegated to Second Division

== Men's football premierships ==
Year	Competition
1924	PDFA
1926	PDFA
1927	PDFA
1934	MPFL - B Grade
1951	MPFL - A Grade
1954	MPFL - A Grade
1956	MPFL - A Grade
1970	MPFL - A Grade
1981	MPFL - A Grade
1985	MPFL - A Grade
2007	MPNFL Peninsula
2008	MPNFL Peninsula
2009	MPNFL Peninsula

== Netball premierships ==
Year	Competition
2011	B Grade
2012	C Grade
2019	Under 19

== Women's football premierships ==
Year	Competition
2014	VWFL Div 5
2016	VWFL Div 2

== VFL/AFL players ==
- Fred Davies, Carlton, 125 games
- Robert Elphinstone, St Kilda, 157 games
- Anthony Harvey, St Kilda, 4 games
- Robert Harvey, St Kilda, 1988–2008, 383 games (215 goals)
- Eric White, South Melbourne, 21 games
- Brian Woinarski, St Kilda, 41 games
- Steve Arnott, Melbourne, 1 game
- Ron Battams, St Kilda, 3 games
- Aaron Edwards, West Coast, North Melbourne, Richmond, 2003–14
- Damian McCormack, Western Bulldogs, 4 games, 2005–07
- Marcus Marigliani, Essendon, 2 games, 2010
- Jack Lonie, St Kilda, 2015–present
- Mitchell White, Melbourne, 2015–present

== Bibliography ==
- History of the Seaford Football Club - Mark Pearson
