= Tyler Sonsie =

Australian rules footballer

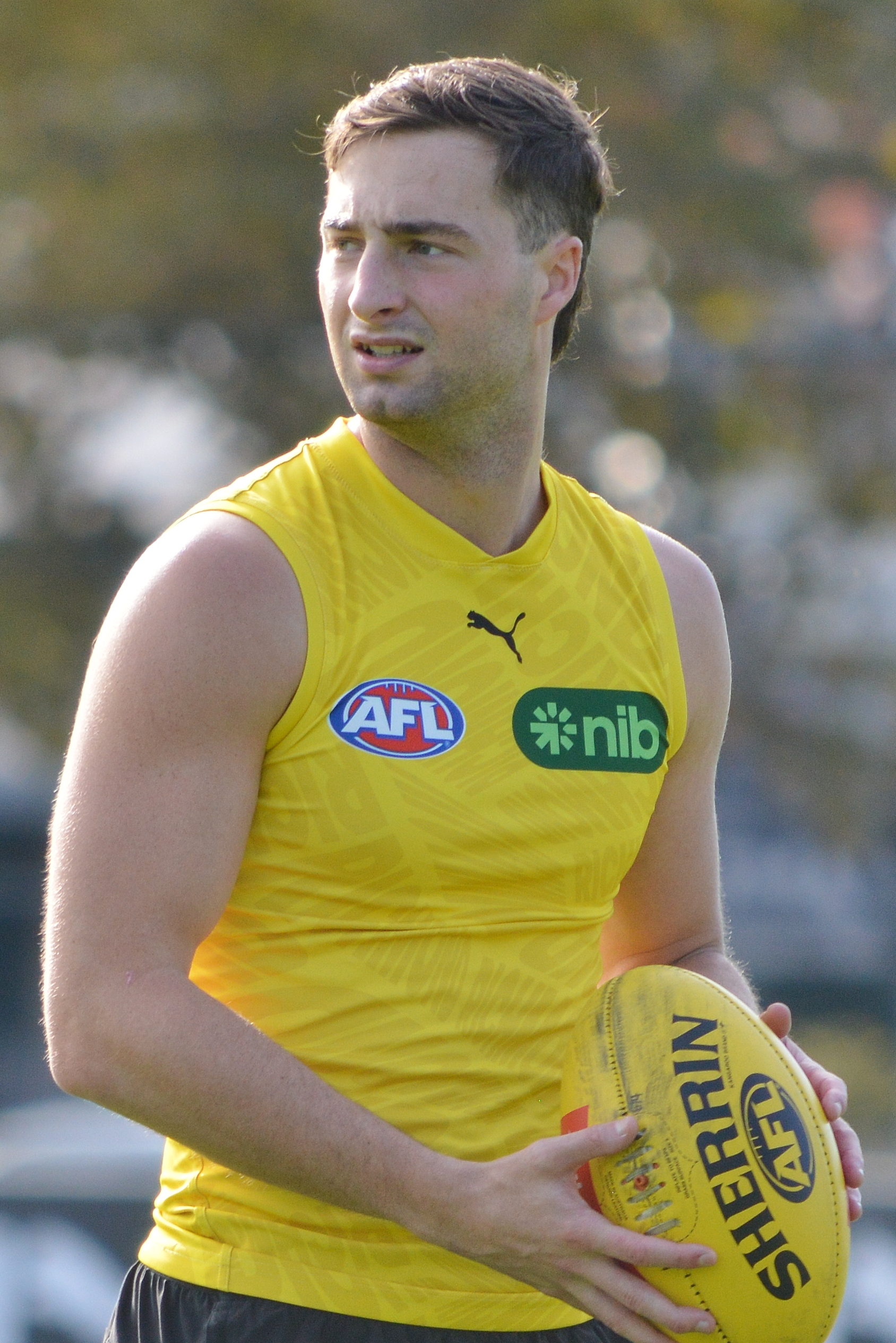
- Sonsie in May 2026

Personal information
- Born: 27 January 2003 (age 23)
- Original teams: Eastern Rangers (NAB League), Lysterfield
- Draft: No. 28, 2021 AFL National Draft: Richmond
- Debut: Round 18, 2022, Richmond vs. North Melbourne, at Marvel Stadium
- Height: 181 cm (5 ft 11 in)
- Weight: 73 kg (161 lb)
- Position: Midfielder

Playing career^{1}
Years	Club	Games (Goals)
2022–2026	Richmond	55 (15)
- ^{1} Playing statistics correct to the end of 2026.

Tyler Sonsie (born 27 January 2003) is a professional Australian rules footballer who last played for the Richmond Football Club in the Australian Football League (AFL). Sonsie was drafted by Richmond with the 28th pick in the 2021 AFL draft, and made his AFL debut in round 18 of the 2022 season.

== Early life and junior football ==
Sonsie played junior football in Melbourne's outer eastern suburbs, the Lysterfield Wolves Junior Football Club, as well as at Scoresby and Rowville, and completed high school studies at Rowville Secondary College in 2020, as a member of the Rowville Sports Academy AFL program.

In 2019, Sonsie made his NAB League debut, playing top level junior football for the Eastern Ranges at age 16, including in the side's grand final loss. The same season he was selected to play national representative football for the Victorian Metropolitan Under 16s side, where he earned MVP honours as the team's best player in its national championship winning run.

The impacts of the COVID-19 pandemic saw the 2020 junior football season cancelled entirely.

In the lead in to the 2021 season, Sonsie was projected by AFL Media and ESPN as a likely top five pick in the forthcoming AFL draft. During the year he played junior representative football with the Eastern Ranges, top level exhibition games for the AFL Academy side and made his VFL debut for Box Hill where he starred with 24 disposals and two goals. At the end of the NAB League season, he was rewarded with Team of the Year selection honours in what was a partially COVID interrupted season. Despite occasional starring performances, Sonsie's draft ranking progressively fell over the course of the season, as pundits considered his output uneven and inconsistent.

Across his junior career, Sonsie was lauded for his ability to play inside and outside of midfield stoppages and his disposal accuracy.

Immediately prior to the AFL draft, Sonsie was projected to be taken with the 17th and 23rd picks by AFL Media and ESPN, respectively.

== AFL career ==
Sonsie was drafted by Richmond with the club's third pick and the 28th selection overall in the 2021 AFL draft.

He made his debut in Round 18 of the 2022 season and held his spot for the remainder of the season, as well as in the club's elimination final loss to Brisbane. He played a total of seven AFL games that season. In Round 22 of the 2023 VFL season he was suspended for three weeks after striking North Melbourne's Tom Cappellari.

Sonsie saw consistent football at the AFL level following the 2023 season, playing 45 times over the next three years. However, he was delisted at the end of the 2026 season.

== Statistics ==
Updated to the end of round 22, 2026.

Legend
G	Goals	K	Kicks	D	Disposals	T	Tackles
B	Behinds	H	Handballs	M	Marks

Season	Team	No.	Games	Totals							Averages (per game)							Votes
Season	Team	No.	Games	G	B	K	H	D	M	T	G	B	K	H	D	M	T	Votes
2022	Richmond	40	7	3	3	71	52	123	18	13	0.4	0.4	10.1	7.4	17.6	2.6	1.9	0
2023	Richmond	40	3	0	0	16	18	34	4	4	0.0	0.0	5.3	6.0	11.3	1.3	1.3	0
2024	Richmond	40	14	4	8	97	67	164	38	17	0.3	0.6	6.9	4.8	11.7	2.7	1.2	0
2025	Richmond	40	16	3	9	133	111	244	61	27	0.2	0.6	8.3	6.9	15.3	3.8	1.7	0
2026	Richmond	40	15	5	5	144	101	245	56	23	0.3	0.3	9.6	6.7	16.3	3.7	1.5	0
Career			55	15	25	461	349	810	177	84	0.3	0.5	8.4	6.3	14.7	3.2	1.5	0
