= Rebecca Miller (footballer) =

Australian rules footballer

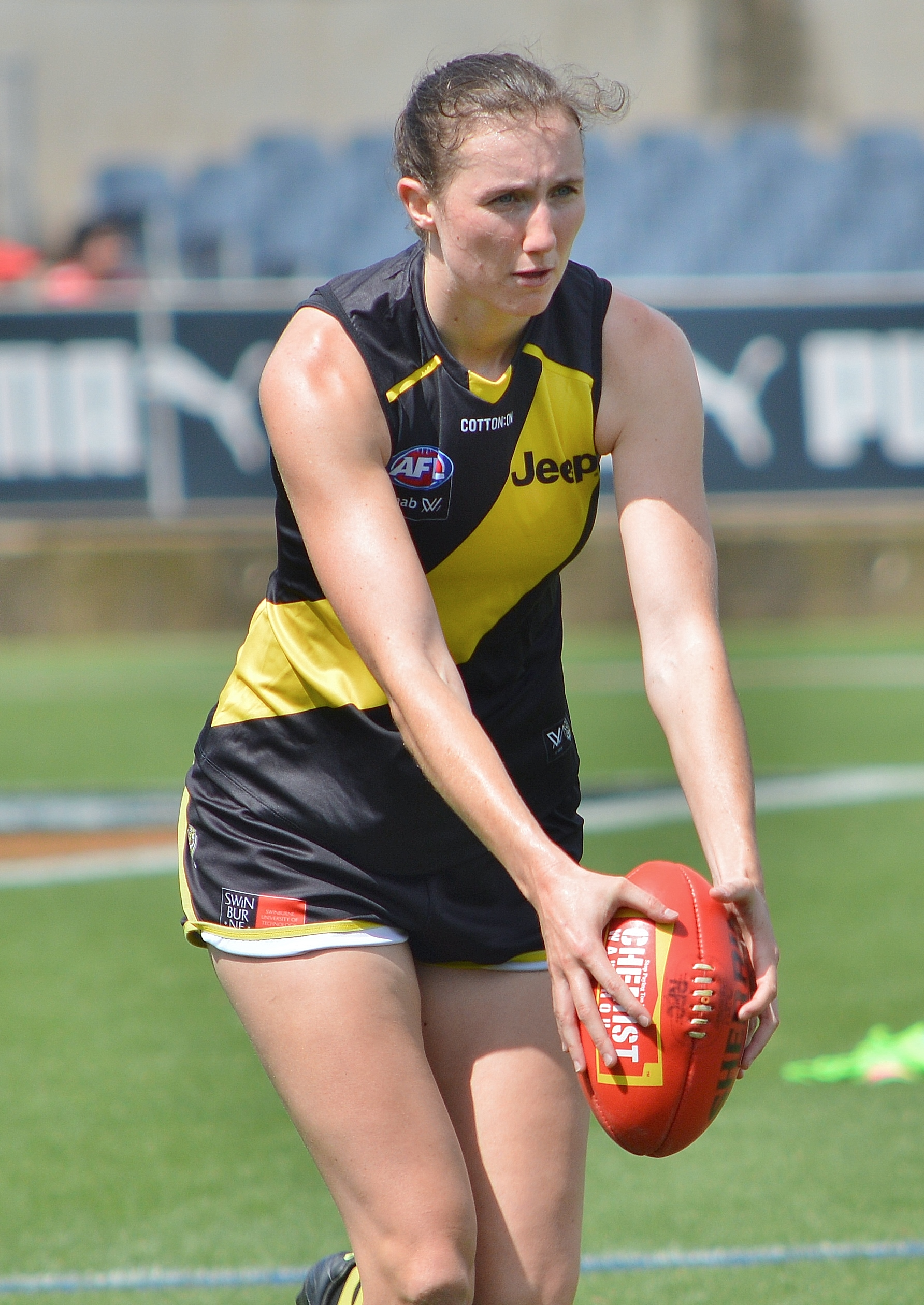
- Miller with Richmond in February 2020

Personal information
- Born: 10 August 1995 (age 31)
- Original team: Richmond (VFLW)
- Debut: Round 1, 2020, Richmond vs. Carlton, at Ikon Park
- Height: 184 cm (6 ft 0 in)
- Position: Full back

Club information
- Current club: Richmond
- Number: 15

Playing career^{1}
Years	Club	Games (Goals)
2020–	Richmond	39 (0)
- ^{1} Playing statistics correct to the end of the 2023 season.

Career highlights
- VFLW: VFL Team of the Year: 2019

Rebecca Miller (born 10 August 1995) is an Australian rules footballer playing for the Richmond Football Club in the AFL Women's (AFLW). Miller signed with Richmond during the first period of the 2019 expansion club signing period in July. She made her debut against Carlton at Ikon Park in the opening round of the 2020 season.

== Statistics ==
Statistics are correct to round 3, 2022 season 6

Legend
G	Goals	K	Kicks	D	Disposals	T	Tackles
B	Behinds	H	Handballs	M	Marks

Season	Team	No.	Games	Totals							Averages (per game)						
Season	Team	No.	Games	G	B	K	H	D	M	T	G	B	K	H	D	M	T
2020	Richmond	15	6	0	0	23	17	40	8	9	0.0	0.0	3.8	2.8	6.7	1.3	1.5
2021	Richmond	15	9	0	0	58	18	76	16	8	0.0	0.0	6.4	2.0	8.4	1.8	0.9
2022 (S6)	Richmond	15	3	0	0	19	12	31	4	5	0.0	0.0	6.3	4.0	10.3	1.3	1.7
Career			18	0	0	100	47	147	28	22	0.0	0.0	5.6	2.6	8.2	1.6	1.2
