= Emelia Yassir =

Australian rules footballer

Personal information
- Full name: Emelia Yassir
- Born: 25 September 2003 (age 23)
- Original team: Calder Cannons (VFLW)
- Draft: No. 16, 2021 National Draft
- Debut: Round 1, 2022 (S6), Richmond vs. St Kilda, at RSEA Park
- Height: 160 cm (5 ft 3 in)
- Position: Forward/Midfielder

Club information
- Current club: Richmond
- Number: 27

Playing career^{1}
Years	Club	Games (Goals)
2022 (S6)–	Richmond	29 (16)
- ^{1} Playing statistics correct to the end of the 2023 season.

Emelia Yassir (born 25 September 2003) is an Australian rules footballer playing for the Richmond Football Club in the AFL Women's (AFLW). Yassir was drafted by Richmond with their second selection and sixteenth overall in the 2021 AFL Women's draft. She made her debut against St Kilda at RSEA Park in the first round of 2022 season 6.

Yassir is of Lebanese descent from both her parents.

== Statistics ==
Statistics are correct to round 2, 2022 (S6)

Legend
G	Goals	K	Kicks	D	Disposals	T	Tackles
B	Behinds	H	Handballs	M	Marks

Season	Team	No.	Games	Totals							Averages (per game)						
Season	Team	No.	Games	G	B	K	H	D	M	T	G	B	K	H	D	M	T
2022 (S6)	Richmond	27	1	0	0	3	4	7	1	3	0	0	3	4	7	1	3
Career			1	0	0	3	4	7	1	3	0	0	3	4	7	1	3
