= Brian Woinarski =

Australian rules footballer

Personal information
- Full name: Brian Woinarski
- Born: 5 May 1930 (age 96)
- Original team: Seaford
- Height: 180 cm (5 ft 11 in)
- Weight: 75 kg (165 lb)

Playing career^{1}
Years	Club	Games (Goals)
1951–53	St Kilda	41 (1)
- ^{1} Playing statistics correct to the end of 1953.

Brian Woinarski (born 5 May 1930) is a former Australian rules footballer who played with St Kilda in the Victorian Football League (VFL).
