= Iilish Ross =

Australian rules footballer

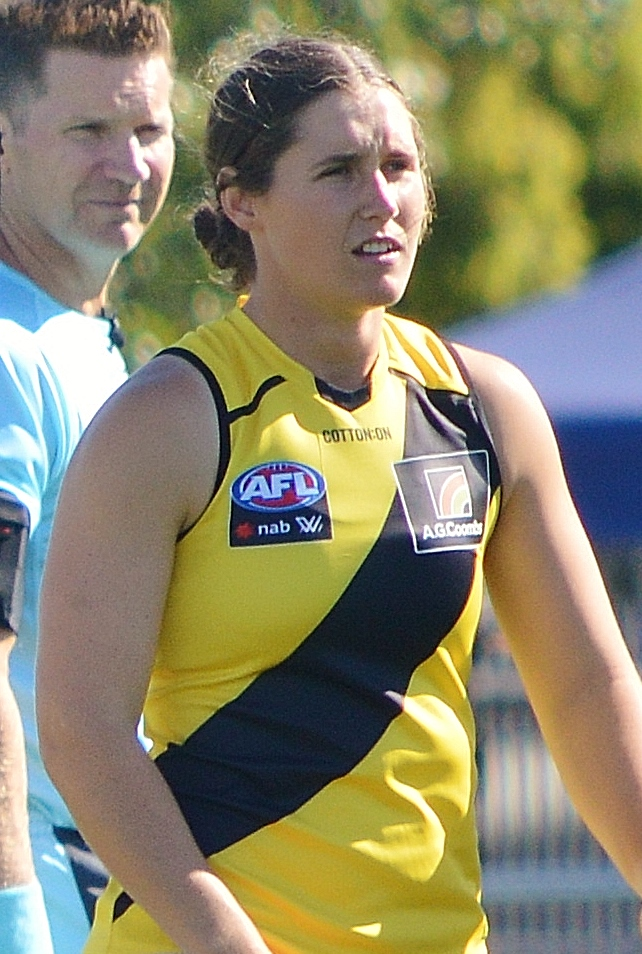
- Ross with Richmond in February 2021

Personal information
- Born: 21 June 1999 (age 27)
- Original team: Murray Bushrangers (TAC Cup)
- Draft: No. 13, 2017 AFL Women's draft
- Debut: Round 1, 2018, Carlton vs. Collingwood, at Ikon Park
- Height: 169 cm (5 ft 7 in)
- Position: Defender

Club information
- Current club: Richmond
- Number: 21

Playing career^{1}
Years	Club	Games (Goals)
2018–2019	Collingwood	11 (0)
2020–2022	Richmond	10 (0)
Total		21 (0)
- ^{1} Playing statistics correct to the end of the 2022 season.

Iilish Ross (born 21 June 1999) is an Australian rules footballer playing for the Richmond Football Club in the AFL Women's (AFLW). She previously played 11 matches over two seasons with Collingwood.

== AFL Women's career ==
Ross was drafted by Collingwood with their second selection and thirteenth overall in the 2017 AFL Women's draft. She made her debut in the eight point loss to Carlton at Ikon Park in the opening round of the 2018 season.

In April 2019 she signed an expansion period contract with Richmond. Ross suffered a foot injury in the 2020 pre-season which ruled her out from contention for the opening rounds of the season. She made her debut for Richmond against St Kilda at RSEA Park in round 6 of the 2020 season.

== Statistics ==
Statistics are correct to round 7, 2022

Legend
G	Goals	K	Kicks	D	Disposals	T	Tackles
B	Behinds	H	Handballs	M	Marks

Season	Team	No.	Games	Totals							Averages (per game)						
Season	Team	No.	Games	G	B	K	H	D	M	T	G	B	K	H	D	M	T
2018	Collingwood	21	5	0	0	21	10	31	7	14	0.0	0.0	4.2	2.0	6.2	1.4	2.8
2019	Collingwood	21	6	0	0	23	7	30	7	15	0.0	0.0	3.8	1.2	5.0	1.2	2.5
2020	Richmond	21	1	0	0	6	2	8	1	3	0.0	0.0	6.0	2.0	8.0	1.0	3.0
2021	Richmond	21	9	0	0	29	29	58	3	13	0.0	0.0	3.2	3.2	6.4	0.3	1.4
Career			21	0	0	79	48	127	18	45	0.0	0.0	3.8	2.3	6.0	0.9	2.1
