= 2026 Hawthorn Football Club women's season =

5th season in the AFL Women's

Hawthorn Football Club
2026 season
- President: Andrew Gowers
- Coach: Daniel Webster
- Captain: Emily Bates
- Home ground: Kennedy Community Centre
- Home and Away: 8th
- Leading goalkicker: Áine McDonagh (21)
- Average home attendance: 2,797

The 2025 Hawthorn Football Club season is the club's 5th season in the AFL Women's.

== Playing list changes ==
=== Additions ===
Date	Player	Type	From	Ref
10 December 2025	Jacqui Dupuy	Trade	Gold Coast	
10 December 2025	Niamh Martin	Trade	North Melbourne	
15 December 2025	Hannah Looney	Draft	—	
15 December 2025	Maya Dear	Draft	—	
4 May 2026	Mikaylah Antony	Draft	—	
4 June 2026	Poppy Stockwell	Replacement player	Perth Demons	
26 June 2026	Matilda Van Berkel	Replacement player	Box Hill Hawks	
6 August 2026	Annabelle Embelton	Replacement player	Box Hill Hawks	

=== Departures ===
Date	Player	Type	To	Ref
21 November 2025	Nat Exon	Delisted	—	
21 November 2025	Kristy Stratton	Delisted	—	
10 December 2025	Sophie Butterworth	Trade	St Kilda	
10 December 2025	Tilly Lucas-Rodd	Trade	Greater Western Sydney	
11 December 2025	Ainslie Kemp	Delisted	—	
12 May 2026	Aileen Gilroy	Retired	—	

=== Contract extensions ===
Date	Player	Contract length	Contract ends	Ref
28 January 2026	Eliza West	One year	2027	
3 February 2026	Laura Stone	One year	2027	
5 February 2026	Emily Everist	One year	2027	
13 February 2026	Keely Coyne	One year	2027	
26 February 2026	Grace Baba	One year	2027	
26 February 2026	Lavinia Cox	One year	2027	
26 February 2026	Daisy Flockart	One year	2027	
26 February 2026	Eli Symonds	One year	2027	

== 2026 player squad ==
2026 Hawthorn Football Club squad
Senior list		Coaching staff
1 Emily Bates **(C)**; 2 Eliza West **(VC)**; 3 Greta Bodey; 4 Najwa Allen; 5 Jasmine Fleming; 6 Hayley McLaughlin; 7 Niamh Martin; 8 Lavinia Cox; 9 Keely Coyne; 10 Kaitlyn Ashmore; 11 Jenna Richardson; 12 Casey Sherriff; 13 Áine McDonagh; 14 Daisy Flockart; 15 Grace Baba; 16 Mikaylah Antony	17 Mackenzie Eardley; 18 Hannah Looney; 19 Bridie Hipwell; 20 Laura Elliot; 21 Elli Symonds; 22 Laura Stone; 23 Jess Vukic; 24 Tamara Smith; 25 Emily Everist; 27 Mikayla Williamson; 28 Poppy Stockwell; 30 Matilda Van Berkel; 31 Lucy Wales; 34 Annabelle Embelton; 35 Maya Dear; 38 Jacqui Dupuy	**Head coach**: Daniel Webster; **Assistant coaches**: Steph Binder (back line); Cameron Howat (midfield); Ben Cavarra (forward line); Cam McKinlay (assistant midfield); Mark Williams (head of development); Michael Ericson (development); Jake Ireland (development); Phoebe McWilliams (development); Legend: (c) Captain(s); (vc) Vice-captain(s); Updated: 10 August 2026; Source(s): Hawthorn AFLW, AFL Women's

=== Pre-season ===
Date and local time	Opponent	**Scores** (Hawthorn's scores indicated in **bold**)			Venue	Attendance	Report
Date and local time	Opponent	Home	Away	Result	Venue	Attendance	Report
Saturday, 11 July (10:00 am)	Western Bulldogs	**9.8 (62)**	2.8 (20)	Won by 42 points	Kennedy Community Centre		
Saturday, 18 July (3:00 pm)	St Kilda	**7.11 (53)**	5.4 (34)	Won by 19 points	Kennedy Community Centre		
Friday, 24 July (2:00 pm)	Sydney	5.4 (34)	**8.11 (59)**	Won by 25 points	Sydney Cricket Ground		
Sunday, 2 August (1:00 pm)	Richmond	**3.8 (26)**	3.5 (23)	Won by 3 points	Kennedy Community Centre		

=== Home and Away ===
Rd	Date and local time	Opponent	**Scores** (Hawthorn's scores indicated in **bold**)			Venue	Attendance	Record	Position	Report
Rd	Date and local time	Opponent	Home	Away	Result	Venue	Attendance	Record	Position	Report
1	Thursday, 13 August (7:15 pm)	Melbourne	**6.5 (41)**	9.6 (60)	Lost by 19 points	IKON Park	2,879	0–1	12th	Report
2	Sunday, 23 August (3:05 pm)	Port Adelaide	5.3 (33)	**10.5 (65)**	Won by 32 points	Alberton Oval	2,706	1–1	7th	Report
3	Sunday, 30 August (3:05 pm)	Collingwood	3.8 (26)	**8.6 (54)**	Won by 28 points	Victoria Park	2,604	2–1	5th	Report
4	Sunday, 6 September (1:05 pm)	Adelaide	**5.9 (39)**	10.7 (67)	Lost by 28 points	Kennedy Community Centre	3,424	2–2	8th	Report
5	Saturday, 12 September (1:05 pm)	Western Bulldogs	**6.5 (41)**	4.6 (30)	Won by 11 points	Kennedy Community Centre	2,363	3–2	8th	Report
6	Friday, 18 September (5:45 pm)	North Melbourne	**4.8 (32)**	3.7 (25)	Won by 7 points	Cazalys Stadium	2,118	4–2	7th	Report
7	Thursday, 24 September (7:15 pm)	Geelong	12.10 (82)	**7.4 (46)**	Lost by 36 points	GMHBA Stadium	3,430	4–3	9th	Report
8	Thursday, 1 October (7:15 pm)	Carlton	5.6 (36)	**3.6 (24)**	Lost by 12 points	IKON Park	2,037	4–4	9th	Report
9	Sunday, 11 October (1:05 pm)	Brisbane	**9.11 (65)**	6.4 (40)	Won by 25 points	Kennedy Community Centre	3,202	5–4	8th	Report
10	Sunday, 18 October (2:35 pm)	Greater Western Sydney				Henson Park				
11	Sunday, 25 October (3:05 pm)	Essendon				Kennedy Community Centre				
12	Saturday, 31 October (7:15 pm)	West Coast				Sullivan Logistics Stadium				

==== Ladder ====
Updated to the end of round 8.

Pos	Team	Pld	W	L	D	PF	PA	PP	Pts	Qualification
1	North Melbourne	8	7	1	0	507	195	260.0	28	Finals series
2	Melbourne	8	7	1	0	498	263	189.4	28	Finals series
3	Geelong	8	7	1	0	557	384	145.1	28	Finals series
4	Gold Coast	8	6	2	0	379	253	149.8	24	Finals series
5	Carlton	8	6	2	0	391	270	144.8	24	Finals series
6	Western Bulldogs	8	6	2	0	334	275	121.5	24	Finals series
7	Sydney	8	6	2	0	379	347	109.2	24	Finals series
8	Fremantle	8	4	4	0	326	290	112.4	16	Finals series
**9**	Hawthorn	**8**	**4**	**4**	**0**	**342**	**359**	**95.3**	16	
10	West Coast	8	4	4	0	329	392	83.9	16	
11	Richmond	8	4	4	0	323	403	80.1	16	
12	Adelaide	8	3	5	0	345	376	91.8	12	
13	Port Adelaide	8	3	5	0	275	349	78.8	12	
14	Brisbane	8	2	6	0	320	356	89.9	8	
15	Greater Western Sydney	8	1	7	0	315	441	71.4	4	
16	Essendon	8	1	7	0	273	440	62.0	4	
17	Collingwood	8	1	7	0	249	437	57.0	4	
18	St Kilda	8	0	8	0	185	497	37.2	0	

Source: afl.com.au
Rules for classification: 1) points; 2) percentage; 3) number of points for

== Milestones ==
Round	Milestone	Name	Opponent	Score	Ground	Ref
1	50th AFLW game	Jacqui Dupuy	Melbourne	6.5 (41) – 9.6 (60)	IKON Park	
1	Club debut	Jacqui Dupuy	Melbourne	6.5 (41) – 9.6 (60)	IKON Park	
1	1st club goal	Jacqui Dupuy	Melbourne	6.5 (41) – 9.6 (60)	IKON Park	
1	AFLW debut	Annabelle Embelton	Melbourne	6.5 (41) – 9.6 (60)	IKON Park	
1	Club debut	Niamh Martin	Melbourne	6.5 (41) – 9.6 (60)	IKON Park	
1	Club debut	Poppy Stockwell	Melbourne	6.5 (41) – 9.6 (60)	IKON Park	
1	1st club goal	Poppy Stockwell	Melbourne	6.5 (41) – 9.6 (60)	IKON Park	
2	AFLW debut	Mikaylah Antony	Port Adelaide	5.3 (33) – 10.5 (65)	Alberton Oval	
2	1st AFLW goal	Lucy Wales	Port Adelaide	5.3 (33) – 10.5 (65)	Alberton Oval	
3	1st AFLW goal	Jenna Richardson	Collingwood	3.8 (26) – 8.6 (54)	Victoria Park	
4	100th AFLW game	Emily Bates	Adelaide	5.9 (39) – 10.7 (67)	Kennedy Community Centre	
4	1st AFLW goal	Mikaylah Antony	Adelaide	5.9 (39) – 10.7 (67)	Kennedy Community Centre	
5	50th AFLW game	Tamara Smith	Western Bulldogs	6.5 (41) – 4.6 (30)	Kennedy Community Centre	
6	50th AFLW game	Áine McDonagh	North Melbourne	4.8 (32) – 3.7 (25)	Cazalys Stadium	
8	50th AFLW game	Jasmine Fleming	Carlton	5.6 (36) – 3.6 (24)	IKON Park	
8	50th club game	Kaitlyn Ashmore	Carlton	5.6 (36) – 3.6 (24)	IKON Park	
9	100th AFLW game	Kaitlyn Ashmore	Brisbane	9.11 (65) – 6.4 (40)	Kennedy Community Centre	
9	50th AFLW game	Lucy Wales	Brisbane	9.11 (65) – 6.4 (40)	Kennedy Community Centre	
