= 2025 Hawthorn Football Club women's season =

4th season in the AFL Women's

Hawthorn Football Club
2025 season
- President: Andrew Gowers
- Coach: Daniel Webster
- Captain: Emily Bates
- Home ground: Kinetic Stadium
- Home and Away: 4th
- Finals: Semi final
- Leading goalkicker: Áine McDonagh (22)
- Highest home attendance: 5,645 (Semi-final vs. Carlton)
- Lowest home attendance: 1,643 (Round 8 vs. Fremantle)
- Average home attendance: 2,660

The 2025 Hawthorn Football Club season is the club's 4th season in the AFL Women's.

== Key personnel ==
Position	Name
Board members
President	Andrew Gowers
Director	Anne-Marie Pellizzer
Director	Ian Silk
Director	James Merlino
Director	Katie Hudson
Director	Luke Stambolis
Director	Owen Wilson
Director	Tim Shearer
Director	Luke McCabe
Coaches
Senior coach	Daniel Webster
Backline coach	Steph Binder
Forwards coach	Cam Howat
Midfield coach/List manager	Keegan Brooksby
Development coach	Michael Ericson
Development coach	Cam McKinlay
Development coach	Jake Ireland
Development coach	Kai Baker-Hill
Development coach	Devina Lai
Leadership group
Captain	Emily Bates
Vice–captain	Eliza West
Leadership group member	Jasmine Fleming
Leadership group member	Tilly Lucas-Rodd
Leadership group member	Áine McDonagh
Leadership group member	Jenna Richardson

== Playing list changes ==
=== Additions ===
Date	Player	Reason	Old club	Ref
5 December 2024	Keely Coyne	Delisted free agent	Western Bulldogs	
10 December 2024	Najwa Allen	Trade	Adelaide	
16 December 2024	Lavinia Cox	Draft	Bendigo Pioneers	
16 December 2024	Daisy Flockart	Draft	Sandringham Dragons	
16 December 2024	Grace Baba	Draft	Eastern Ranges	
16 December 2024	Elli Symonds	Draft	Dandenong Stingrays	
16 December 2024	Rebecca Clottey	Draft	Geelong Falcons	
22 October 2025	Nat Exon	Free agent	St Kilda	

=== Departures ===
Date	Player	Reason	New club	Ref
19 November 2024	Bridget Deed	Delisted	—	
19 November 2024	Casey Dumont	Delisted	—	
7 December 2024	Charlotte Baskaran	Trade	St Kilda	
10 December 2024	Louise Stephenson	Trade	Western Bulldogs	
10 December 2024	Mattea Breed	Trade	Collingwood	
12 December 2024	Tahlia Fellows	Delisted	—	
12 December 2024	Sophie Locke	Delisted	—	
22 October 2025	Rebecca Clottey	Delisted	—	

== 2025 player squad ==
2025 Hawthorn Football Club squad
Senior list		Rookie list	Coaching staff
1 Emily Bates **(C)**; 2 Eliza West **(VC)**; 3 Greta Bodey; 4 Najwa Allen; 5 Jasmine Fleming; 6 Hayley McLaughlin; 7 Aileen Gilroy; 8 Lavinia Cox; 9 Keely Coyne; 10 Kaitlyn Ashmore; 11 Jenna Richardson; 12 Casey Sherriff; 14 Daisy Flockart; 15 Grace Baba; 16 Ainslie Kemp	17 Mackenzie Eardley; 18 Tilly Lucas-Rodd; 19 Bridie Hipwell; 20 Laura Elliot; 21 Elli Symonds; 22 Laura Stone; 23 Jess Vukic; 24 Tamara Smith; 25 Emily Everist; 27 Mikayla Williamson; 28 Sophie Butterworth; 29 Nat Exon; 31 Lucy Wales; 41 Kristy Stratton	13 Áine McDonagh	**Head coach**: Daniel Webster; **Assistant coaches**: Steph Binder (backline); Keegan Brooksby (midfield); Cam Howat (forwards); Michael Ericson (development); Cam McKinlay (development); Jake Ireland (development); Kai Baker-Hill (development); Devina Lai (development); Legend: (c) Captain(s); (vc) Vice-captain(s); Updated: 12 November 2025; Source(s): Hawthorn AFLW, AFL Women's

=== Pre-season ===
Date and local time	Opponent	**Scores** (Hawthorn's scores indicated in **bold**)			Venue	Attendance	Report
Date and local time	Opponent	Home	Away	Result	Venue	Attendance	Report
Saturday, 26 July (12:30 pm)	Melbourne	9.8 (62)	**4.4 (28)**	Lost by 34 points	Casey Fields	—	
Sunday, 3 August (12:00 pm)	Richmond	6.2 (38)	**10.15 (75)**	Won by 37 points	IKON Park	—	

=== Home and Away ===
Rd	Date and local time	Opponent	**Scores** (Hawthorn's scores indicated in **bold**)			Venue	Attendance	Position	Report
Rd	Date and local time	Opponent	Home	Away	Result	Venue	Attendance	Position	Report
1	Sunday, 17 August (12:40 pm)	Brisbane	3.11 (29)	**4.9 (33)**	Won by 4 points	Brighton Homes Arena	4,208	9th	Report
2	Saturday, 23 August (7:15 pm)	Carlton	**3.12 (30)**	2.10 (22)	Won by 8 points	Kinetic Stadium	2,214	5th	Report
3	Saturday, 30 August (7:15 pm)	Western Bulldogs	1.4 (10)	**2.2 (14)**	Won by 4 points	Mission Whitten Oval	2,021	5th	Report
4	Saturday, 6 September (7:15 pm)	St Kilda	**5.10 (40)**	2.5 (17)	Won by 23 points	Cazalys Stadium	2,017	4th	Report
5	Sunday, 14 September (3:05 pm)	Adelaide	**4.3 (27)**	7.6 (48)	Lost by 21 points	Kinetic Stadium	2,401	5th	Report
6	Saturday, 20 September (12:35 pm)	Collingwood	3.12 (30)	**5.9 (39)**	Won by 9 points	Victoria Park	2,067	3rd	Report
7	Thursday, 25 September (7:15 pm)	Geelong	5.5 (35)	**6.6 (42)**	Won by 7 points	GMHBA Stadium	3,146	3rd	Report
8	Thursday, 2 October (7:15 pm)	Fremantle	**5.3 (33)**	2.6 (18)	Won by 15 points	Kinetic Stadium	1,643	3rd	Report
9	Saturday, 11 October (3:05 pm)	Gold Coast	**8.12 (60)**	6.1 (37)	Won by 23 points	Kinetic Stadium	2,195	2nd	Report
10	Friday, 17 October (7:15 pm)	Port Adelaide	15.4 (94)	**8.11 (59)**	Lost by 35 points	Alberton Oval	3,039	3rd	Report
11	Saturday, 25 October (3:05 pm)	Essendon	3.8 (26)	**7.14 (56)**	Won by 30 points	Windy Hill	2,652	2nd	Report
12	Friday, 31 October (7:15 pm)	North Melbourne	**2.6 (18)**	10.7 (67)	Lost by 49 points	Kinetic Stadium	2,508	4th	Report

==== Ladder ====
Pos	Team	Pld	W	L	D	PF	PA	PP	Pts	Qualification
1	North Melbourne (P)	12	12	0	0	868	270	321.5	48	Finals series
2	Melbourne	12	9	3	0	684	327	209.2	36	Finals series
3	Brisbane	12	9	3	0	652	403	161.8	36	Finals series
**4**	Hawthorn	**12**	**9**	**3**	**0**	**451**	**433**	**104.2**	36	Finals series
5	Carlton	12	8	4	0	554	474	116.9	32	Finals series
6	Adelaide	12	7	5	0	515	460	112.0	28	Finals series
7	St Kilda	12	7	5	0	392	407	96.3	28	Finals series
8	West Coast	12	6	6	0	472	423	111.6	24	Finals series
9	Sydney	12	6	6	0	542	504	107.5	24	
10	Port Adelaide	12	6	6	0	631	601	105.0	24	
11	Fremantle	12	6	6	0	414	512	80.9	24	
12	Western Bulldogs	12	5	7	0	415	358	115.9	20	
13	Geelong	12	5	7	0	500	539	92.8	20	
14	Essendon	12	4	8	0	331	552	60.0	16	
15	Collingwood	12	3	9	0	314	505	62.2	12	
16	Richmond	12	2	10	0	349	583	59.9	8	
17	Greater Western Sydney	12	2	10	0	401	681	58.9	8	
18	Gold Coast	12	2	10	0	319	772	41.3	8	

Source: afl.com.au
Rules for classification: 1) points; 2) percentage; 3) number of points for
(P) Premiers

=== Finals Series ===
Rd	Date and local time	Opponent	Scores (Hawthorn's scores indicated in bold)			Venue	Attendance	Report
Rd	Date and local time	Opponent	Home	Away	Result	Venue	Attendance	Report
Qualifying final	Friday, 7 November (7:15 pm)	North Melbourne	5.12 (42)	**0.3 (3)**	Lost by 39 points	IKON Park	4,392	Report
Semi final	Saturday, 15 November (7:15 pm)	Carlton	**4.9 (33)**	11.13 (79)	Lost by 46 points	IKON Park	5,645	Report

== Statistics ==
As of the end of finals week 2. Players without appearances not included

No	Name	Pos.	Games	Goals	Behinds	Kicks	Handballs	Disposals	Marks	Tackles	Hitouts
1	Emily Bates	MF	8	1	1	59	113	172	12	45	0
2	Eliza West	MF	14	1	0	104	212	316	18	78	0
3	Greta Bodey	FW	14	11	14	78	60	138	23	51	0
4	Najwa Allen	DF	7	0	1	50	21	71	19	2	0
5	Jasmine Fleming	MF	11	2	3	100	83	183	17	57	0
6	Hayley McLaughlin	FW	11	2	1	46	59	105	20	42	0
7	Aileen Gilroy	FW	9	2	12	103	21	124	20	32	0
8	Lavinia Cox	FW	3	0	0	10	5	15	2	4	0
9	Keely Coyne	DF	14	2	1	96	54	150	21	32	0
10	Kaitlyn Ashmore	MF	10	3	2	63	32	95	21	36	0
11	Jenna Richardson	DF	12	0	0	99	52	151	56	28	0
12	Casey Sherriff	MF	14	2	3	68	44	112	12	36	0
13	Áine McDonagh	FW	14	22	22	106	63	169	31	33	3
14	Daisy Flockart	MF	7	1	2	39	32	71	3	39	1
15	Grace Baba	MF	9	0	4	47	30	77	8	19	0
16	Ainslie Kemp	DF	1	0	1	12	3	15	3	0	0
17	Mackenzie Eardley	FW	12	1	2	72	46	118	25	50	62
18	Tilly Lucas-Rodd	DF	14	0	2	215	84	299	50	54	0
19	Bridie Hipwell	FW	6	2	1	32	23	55	3	29	0
20	Laura Elliott	DF	14	0	0	88	47	135	33	19	0
21	Elli Symonds	RU	8	2	1	27	27	54	12	25	40
22	Laura Stone	FW	13	4	3	94	82	176	10	88	0
23	Jess Vukic	RU	9	2	0	16	23	39	0	28	38
24	Tamara Smith	DF	13	0	0	84	60	144	27	75	0
25	Emily Everist	DF	12	0	0	103	36	139	26	37	0
27	Mikayla Williamson	MF	13	2	4	88	62	150	19	33	0
28	Sophie Butterworth	FW	5	0	0	14	6	20	8	5	2
29	Nat Exon	MF	3	0	0	10	7	17	3	11	0
31	Lucy Wales	RU	9	0	1	91	74	165	25	53	180
41	Kristy Stratton	FW	4	1	4	20	10	30	11	7	0

== Goalkickers ==
Name	Goals	Games	Average
Áine McDonagh	22	14	1.6
Greta Bodey	11	14	0.8
Laura Stone	4	14	0.3
Kaitlyn Ashmore	3	10	0.3
Keely Coyne	2	14	0.2
Jasmine Fleming	2	11	0.2
Aileen Gilroy	2	9	0.2
Bridie Hipwell	2	6	0.3
Hayley McLaughlin	2	11	0.2
Casey Sherriff	2	14	0.1
Elli Symonds	2	8	0.3
Jess Vukic	2	9	0.2
Mikayla Williamson	2	13	0.2
Emily Bates	1	8	0.1
Mackenzie Eardley	1	12	0.1
Daisy Flockart	1	7	0.1
Kristy Stratton	1	4	0.3
Eliza West	1	14	0.1

== Injury list ==
Name	Injury	Status	Source	Injury date	Return date
Laura Stone	Ankle			6 October 2024	3 August 2025
Mackenzie Eardley	Knee			12 August 2025	23 August 2025
Jenna Richardson	Hamstring			12 August 2025	30 August 2025
Kristy Stratton	Hamstring			12 August 2025	16 September 2025
Jasmine Fleming	Knee			17 August 2025	14 September 2025
Aileen Gilroy	Hamstring			17 August 2025	20 September 2025
Áine McDonagh	Thumb			17 August 2025	23 August 2025
Ainslie Kemp	Knee			21 August 2025	
Najwa Allen	Hamstring			30 August 2025	21 October 2025
Kaitlyn Ashmore	Hamstring			30 August 2025	25 September 2025
Mackenzie Eardley	Knee			14 September 2025	20 September 2025
Emily Everist	Concussion			20 September 2025	31 September 2025
Bridie Hipwell	Leg			20 September 2025	
Emily Bates	Shoulder			25 September 2025	15 November 2025
Mikayla Williamson	Hamstring			11 October 2025	25 October 2025
Lucy Wales	Appendix			17 October 2025	
Jess Vukic	Concussion			17 October 2025	4 November 2025
Lavinia Cox	Ankle			28 October 2025	
Elli Symonds	Foot			31 October 2025	
Kaitlyn Ashmore	Calf			7 November 2025	
Emily Everist	Concussion			7 November 2025	
Jasmine Fleming	Groin			7 November 2025	15 November 2025
Áine McDonagh	Knee			7 November 2025	15 November 2025

== Awards ==
Name	Award	Ref.
Áine McDonagh	All-Australian team (1st selection)	
Jasmine Fleming	22under22 team (3rd selection)	

== Milestones ==
Round	Name	Milestone	Opponent	Score	Ground	Ref
1	Eliza West	50th AFLW game	Brisbane	4.9 (33) – 3.11 (29)	Brighton Homes Arena	
1	Lavinia Cox	AFLW debut	Brisbane	4.9 (33) – 3.11 (29)	Brighton Homes Arena	
1	Najwa Allen	Club debut	Brisbane	4.9 (33) – 3.11 (29)	Brighton Homes Arena	
1	Keely Coyne	Club debut	Brisbane	4.9 (33) – 3.11 (29)	Brighton Homes Arena	
2	Grace Baba	AFLW debut	Carlton	3.12 (30) – 2.10 (22)	Kinetic Stadium	
3	Elli Symonds	AFLW debut	Western Bulldogs	2.2 (14) – 1.4 (10)	Mission Whitten Oval	
5	Elli Symonds	1st AFLW goal	Adelaide	4.3 (27) – 7.6 (48)	Kinetic Stadium	
6	Keely Coyne	1st club goal	Collingwood	5.9 (39) – 3.12 (30)	Victoria Park	
8	Daisy Flockart	AFLW debut	Fremantle	5.3 (33) – 2.6 (18)	Kinetic Stadium	
8	Hayley McLaughlin	1st AFLW goal	Fremantle	5.3 (33) – 2.6 (18)	Kinetic Stadium	
11	Áine McDonagh	50th AFLW goal	Essendon	7.14 (56) – 3.8 (26)	Windy Hill	
12	Najwa Allen	50th AFLW game	North Melbourne	2.6 (18) – 10.7 (67)	IKON Park	
Semi-final	Daisy Flockart	1st AFLW goal	Carlton	4.9 (33) – 11.13 (79)	IKON Park	
