= 2023 Hawthorn Football Club women's season =

2nd season in the AFL Women's

Hawthorn Football Club
2023 season
- President: Andrew Gowers
- Coach: Bec Goddard
- Captain: Tilly Lucas-Rodd
- Home ground: Frankston Park
- Record: 3–7 (14th)
- Leading goalkicker: Áine McDonagh (10)

The 2023 Hawthorn Football Club season is the club's 2nd season in the AFL Women's, the 2nd season playing home games at Frankston Park, Bec Goddard's 2nd second season as coach of Hawthorn, and Tilly Lucas-Rodd's 2nd season as captain.

== Club summary ==
The 2023 AFL Women's season will be the 8th season of the AFL Women's competition since its inception in 2017; having entered the competition in 2022 (S7), it is the 2nd season contested by the Hawthorn Football Club. KFC, and Nature Valley are the club's two major partners.

== Playing list changes ==
=== Trades ===
16 February 2023	To Hawthorn Pick 33, 2023 AFL Women's draft	To North Melbourne Eliza Shannon; Pick 40, 2023 AFL Women's draft

== Free agency ==
Date	Player	Old club	Ref
28 April 2023	Casey Dumont	—N/a	

=== Priority signing period ===
Date	Player	Old club	Ref
2 March 2023	Emily Bates	Brisbane	
2 March 2023	Greta Bodey	Brisbane	

=== Retirements and delistings ===
Date	Player	Reason	Ref
18 October 2023	Jess Duffin	Retired	
12 January 2023	Kate McCarthy	Retired	
16 February 2023	Dominique Carbone	Delisted	
16 February 2023	Isabelle Porter	Delisted	

=== Draft ===
Round	Overall pick	Player	Recruited from	ref
1	4	Mattea Breed	North Adelaide	
2	19	Kristy Stratton	Box Hill	

== 2023 player squad ==
2023 Hawthorn Football Club squad
Senior list		Rookie list	Coaching staff
1 Tegan Cunningham; 2 Janet Baird; 3 Greta Bodey; 4 Mattea Breed; 5 Jasmine Fleming (VC); 6 Zoe Barbakos; 7 Aileen Gilroy; 8 Tahlia Fellows; 9 Charlotte Baskaran; 10 Kaitlyn Ashmore; 11 Jenna Richardson; 12 Louise Stephenson; 15 Bridget Deed; 16 Ainslie Kemp	17 Mackenizie Eardley; 18 Tilly Lucas-Rodd (C); 19 Bridie Hipwell; 20 Laura Elliot; 21 Sophie Locke; 22 Tamara Luke; 23 Sarah Perkins; 24 Tamara Smith; 25 Emily Everist; 31 Lucy Wales; 34 Akec Makur Chuot; 39 Emily Bates (VC); 41 Kristy Stratton; 42 Catherine Brown	13 Áine McDonagh; 26 Casey Dumont	Head coach: Bec Goddard; Assistant coaches: Ben Cavarra (defence); David Mackay (midfield); Lou Wotton (forwards); Keegan Brooksby (head of development); Alana Thomas (development); Kathryn Chatelier (development); Max Lynch (development); Legend: (c) Captain(s); (vc) Vice-captain(s); Updated: 26 September 2023; Source(s): Hawthorn AFLW, AFL Women's

Injury list

As of 31 October 2023

Name	Injury	Status
Catherine Brown	Knee	Season
Bridget Deed	Ankle	Season
Casey Dumont	Ankle	Season

== Season ==
=== Home & Away season ===
Rd	Date and local time	Opponent	Scores (Hawthorn's scores indicated in bold)			Venue	Attendance	Record	Report
Rd	Date and local time	Opponent	Home	Away	Result	Venue	Attendance	Record	Report
1	Saturday, 2 September (7:15 pm)	Essendon	**4.6 (30)**	7.7 (49)	Lost by 19 points	Kinetic Stadium	3,778	0–1	Report
2	Sunday, 10 September (1:05 pm)	Western Bulldogs	5.9 (39)	**6.10 (46)**	Won by 7 points	Mars Stadium	1,564	1–1	Report
3	Saturday, 16 September (5:05 pm)	Fremantle	5.5 (35)	**3.4 (22)**	Lost by 13 points	Fremantle Community Bank Oval	2.092	1–2	Report
4	Friday, 22 September (5:05 pm)	Melbourne	**1.5 (11)**	10.10 (70)	Lost by 59 points	Kinetic Stadium	2,817	1–3	Report
5	Sunday, 1 October (3:05 pm)	Brisbane	**5.2 (32)**	8.11 (59)	Lost by 27 points	Kinetic Stadium	1,755	1–4	Report
6	Saturday, 7 October (3:05 pm)	St Kilda	7.3 (45)	**5.6 (36)**	Lost by 9 points	RSEA Park	2,812	1–5	Report
7	Saturday, 14 October (3:05 pm)	Sydney	3.8 (26)	**5.10 (40)**	Won by 14 points	Henson Park	4,514	2–5	Report
8	Friday, 20 October (7:45 pm)	Richmond	**4.6 (30)**	6.5 (41)	Lost by 11 points	Cazalys Stadium		2–6	Report
9	Sunday, 29 October (5:05 pm)	Port Adelaide	**6.4 (40)**	5.2 (32)	Won by 8 points	Kinetic Stadium	1,771	3–6	Report
10	Saturday, 4 November (5:05 pm)	Geelong	9.6 (60)	**3.2 (20)**	Lost by 40 points	GMHBA Stadium	3,948	3–7	Report

==== Ladder ====
Pos	Team	Pld	W	L	D	PF	PA	PP	Pts	Qualification
1	Adelaide	10	9	1	0	599	314	190.8	36	Finals series
2	Melbourne	10	8	2	0	653	293	222.9	32	Finals series
3	North Melbourne	10	7	3	0	478	213	224.4	28	Finals series
4	Brisbane (P)	10	7	3	0	505	339	149.0	28	Finals series
5	Gold Coast	10	6	3	1	416	351	118.5	26	Finals series
6	Geelong	10	6	4	0	449	318	141.2	24	Finals series
7	Essendon	10	6	4	0	379	354	107.1	24	Finals series
8	Sydney	10	6	4	0	462	432	106.9	24	Finals series
9	St Kilda	10	6	4	0	408	399	102.3	24	
10	Richmond	10	5	5	0	382	379	100.8	20	
11	Collingwood	10	5	5	0	331	399	83.0	20	
12	Carlton	10	4	6	0	361	420	86.0	16	
13	Fremantle	10	4	6	0	289	402	71.9	16	
**14**	Hawthorn	**10**	**3**	**7**	**0**	**307**	**456**	**67.3**	12	
15	Port Adelaide	10	2	7	1	404	538	75.1	10	
16	Greater Western Sydney	10	2	8	0	316	596	53.0	8	
17	West Coast	10	2	8	0	269	530	50.8	8	
18	Western Bulldogs	10	1	9	0	320	595	53.8	4	

Source: afl.com.au
Rules for classification: 1) points; 2) percentage; 3) number of points for
(P) Premiers

==== Results by round ====
Round	1	2	3	4	5	6	7	8	9	10
Ground	H	A	A	H	H	A	A	H	H	A
Result	L	W	L	L	L	L	W	L	W	L
Position	14	8	11	15	15	15	14	14	14	14

Source: AFLW schedule
A = Away; H = Home; W = Win; D = Draw; L = Loss

== Statistics ==
As of the end of season

No.	Player	GM	KI	HB	DI	MK	TK	HO	FF	FA	CL	CP	UP	IF	MI	RB	CM	1%	GA	GL	BH
1	Tegan Cunningham	0	0	0	0	0	0	0	0	0	0	0	0	0	0	0	0	0	0	0	0
2	Janet Baird	0	0	0	0	0	0	0	0	0	0	0	0	0	0	0	0	0	0	0	0
3	Greta Bodey	10	59	24	83	17	46	0	7	6	2	42	37	18	9	2	2	7	3	9	4
4	Mattea Breed	8	34	20	54	9	12	21	3	8	14	34	18	9	0	13	3	13	0	0	0
5	Jasmine Fleming	10	92	68	160	12	41	0	7	9	20	67	103	35	0	12	0	5	4	0	0
6	Zoe Barbakos	0	0	0	0	0	0	0	0	0	0	0	0	0	0	0	0	0	0	0	0
7	Aileen Gilroy	10	94	21	115	16	41	0	9	7	11	50	63	17	0	17	0	24	0	4	4
8	Tahlia Fellows	8	26	23	49	9	27	0	4	5	5	31	23	6	4	0	1	5	1	3	5
9	Charlotte Baskaren	10	65	50	115	14	54	0	8	6	12	54	61	13	0	17	0	11	0	0	2
10	Kaitlyn Ashmore	10	105	45	150	36	38	0	8	7	12	50	81	13	4	24	2	8	1	1	2
11	Jenna Richardson	10	69	48	117	37	19	0	3	4	1	54	47	3	0	22	7	37	0	0	0
12	Louise Stephenson	6	32	16	48	15	13	0	1	3	2	20	25	4	0	14	2	11	1	0	0
13	Áine McDonagh	10	75	35	110	26	21	17	10	5	6	54	59	15	7	5	6	15	2	10	4
15	Bridgit Deed	1	4	5	9	1	7	0	1	0	0	3	8	2	0	0	0	1	0	0	0
16	Ainslie Kemp	4	15	4	19	3	4	0	4	1	0	12	7	2	0	8	1	5	0	0	0
17	MacKenzie Eardley	9	62	22	84	19	30	0	6	1	0	32	43	10	0	22	2	28	3	0	0
18	Tilly Lucas-Rodd	10	124	69	193	24	66	0	9	8	48	101	94	20	2	15	0	7	4	1	4
19	Bridie Hipwell	10	36	27	63	14	29	2	8	5	2	46	29	8	4	1	4	8	1	6	0
20	Laura Elliott	8	61	15	76	23	16	0	4	2	4	31	41	7	0	21	3	15	1	0	0
21	Sophie Locke	8	24	10	34	9	15	0	4	4	4	18	20	3	2	2	0	6	0	1	1
22	Tamara Luke	7	26	14	40	12	23	115	10	9	10	24	15	8	3	5	3	9	0	0	1
23	Sarah Perkins	1	5	1	6	4	5	0	2	0	0	3	4	1	1	0	1	0	0	0	2
24	Tamara Smith	9	48	32	80	17	48	0	5	6	5	35	47	8	1	6	3	9	0	0	2
25	Emily Everist	9	38	39	77	16	39	0	8	3	8	39	39	8	1	10	0	11	0	0	0
26	Casey Dumont	0	0	0	0	0	0	0	0	0	0	0	0	0	0	0	0	0	0	0	0
31	Lucy Wales	9	52	42	94	13	45	142	10	9	24	70	23	12	1	5	4	17	0	0	0
34	Akec Makur Chuot	7	41	6	47	15	12	0	2	3	2	15	29	10	1	5	1	9	0	0	0
39	Emily Bates	10	104	104	208	18	97	0	15	18	49	130	87	29	0	16	0	13	0	1	3
41	Kristy Stratton	10	55	48	103	20	70	0	16	12	14	69	35	18	6	4	4	5	2	5	5
42	Catherine Brown	6	32	15	47	9	12	0	1	6	1	14	22	6	0	12	0	17	0	1	0

== Awards, records and milestones ==
=== AFLW records ===
- Most games played: Emily Bates – 76

=== Club records ===
- Highest score: 6.10 (46)
- Highest score conceded: 10.10 (70)
- Lowest score conceded: 3.8 (26)
- Biggest win: 14 points
- Biggest loss: 59 points
- Consecutive loses: 4 (Tied)
- Most games played: Charlotte Baskaran, Aileen Gilroy, Tilly Lucas-Rodd – 20
- Most goals: Áine McDonagh – 14
- Most behinds: Aileen Gilroy – 9
- Most disposals: Tilly Lucas-Rodd – 369
- Most kicks: Tilly Lucas-Rodd – 242
- Most handballs: Tilly Lucas-Rodd – 127
- Most marks: Kaitlyn Ashmore – 61
- Most hitouts: Lucy Wales – 310
- Most tackles: Tilly Lucas-Rodd – 150
- Most rebound 50s: Catherine Brown – 69
- Most inside 50s: Jasmine Fleming – 56
- Most clearances: Tilly Lucas-Rodd – 89
- Most contested possessions: Tilly Lucas-Rodd – 198
- Most uncontested possessions: Tilly Lucas-Rodd – 164
- Most one perceneters: Jenna Richardson – 46
- Most goal assists: Jasmine Fleming, Áine McDonagh – 5
- Most games coached: Bec Goddard – 20
- Most home and away games coached: Bec Goddard – 20
- Most games won as coach: Bec Goddard – 6
- Most home and away games won as coach: Bec Goddard – 6
- Most goals in a season: Áine McDonagh – 10
- Most behinds in a season: Tahlia Fellows, Kristy Stratton – 5 (Tied with Aileen Gilroy)
- Most disposals in a season: Emily Bates – 208
- Most kicks in a season: Tilly Lucas-Rodd – 124
- Most handballs in a season: Emily Bates – 104
- Most marks in a season: Jenna Richardson – 37
- Most contested possessions in a season: Emily Bates – 130
- Most uncontested possessions in a season: Jasmine Fleming – 103
- Most one percenters in a season: Jenna Richardson – 37
- Most goal assists in a season: Jasmine Fleming, Tilly Lucas-Rodd – 4
- Most disposals in a game: Emily Bates – 31
- Most handballs in a game: Emily Bates – 18 (Twice)
- Most marks in a game: Kaitlyn Ashmore – 9
- Most behinds in a game: Tilly Lucas-Rodd, Tahlia Fellows – 3
- Most hitouts in a game: Tamara Luke – 42
- Most tackles in a game: Emily Bates – 15
- Most uncontested possessions in a game: Kaitlyn Ashmore – 18
- Most marks inside 50 in a game: Áine McDonagh – 4
- Most clearances in a game: Emily Bates – 10
- Most contested possessions in a game: Emily Bates – 23
- Most uncontested possessions in a game: Tilly Lucas-Rodd – 15
- Most one percenters in a game: Jenna Richardson, Mackenzie Eardley, Aileen Gilroy – 7 (Tied with Emily Everist)
- Most goal assists in a game: Áine McDonagh – 2 (Tied with Ainslie Kemp, Tahlia Fellows, and Áine McDonagh)

=== Milestones ===
Round 1

- Mattea Breed – AFLW debut.
- Emily Bates – Hawthorn debut.
- Greta Bodey – Hawthorn debut.
- Kristy Stratton – Hawthorn debut.

Round 2

- Greta Bodey – 1st goal for Hawthorn.

Round 6

- Kristy Stratton – 1st goal for Hawthorn.

Round 8

- Greta Bodey – 50th AFLW game.
