= 2024 Hawthorn Football Club women's season =

3rd season in the AFL Women's

Hawthorn Football Club
2024 season
- President: Andrew Gowers
- Coach: Daniel Webster
- Captain: Emily Bates
- Home ground: Frankston Park
- Home and Away: 2nd
- Finals: Semi-final
- Best and fairest: Eliza West
- Leading goalkicker: Áine McDonagh (16)
- Highest home attendance: 4,985
- Lowest home attendance: 2,106
- Average home attendance: 2,387

The 2024 Hawthorn Football Club season will be the club's 3rd season in the AFL Women's, the 3rd season playing home games at Frankston Park, Daniel Webster's 1st season as coach, and Emily Bates's 1st season as captain.

== Key personnel ==
Position	Name
Board members
President	Andrew Gowers
Director	Anne-Marie Pellizzer
Director	Ian Silk
Director	James Merlino
Director	Katie Hudson
Director	Luke Stambolis
Director	Owen Wilson
Director	Tim Shearer
Director	Luke McCabe
Coaches
Senior coach	Daniel Webster
Backline coach	Steph Binder
Forwards coach	Mitch Cashion
Midfield coach/List manager	Keegan Brooksby
Specialist coach	Jack Gunston
Development coach/tackling coach	Alana Thomas
Development coach	Michael Ericson
Development coach	Kathryn Chatelier
Development coach	Cam McKinlay
Development coach	Matt Dussin
Development coach	Catherine Brown
Leadership group
Captain	Emily Bates
Vice–captain	Eliza West
Leadership group member	Jasmine Fleming
Leadership group member	Tilly Lucas-Rodd
Leadership group member	Jenna Richardson

== Playing list changes ==
=== Trades ===
8 December 2023	To Hawthorn Casey Sherriff; Eliza West; Pick 16, 2023 AFL Women's draft	To Melbourne Pick 5, 2023 AFL Women's draft Pick 26, 2023 AFL Women's draft

=== Draft ===
Round	Overall pick	Player	Recruited from	ref
1	17	Mikayla Williamson	Dandenong Stingrays	
3	45	Sophie Butterworth	Mornington	

=== AFLW expansion Under 18 talent patheway signing period ===
Date	Player	From	Ref
14 November 2023	Laura Stone	Eastern Rangers	
14 November 2023	Hayley McLaughlin	Eastern Rangers	
14 November 2023	Jess Vukic	Eastern Rangers	

=== Retirements and delistings ===
Date	Player	Reason	Ref
26 October 2023	Akec Makur Chuot	Retired	
31 October 2023	Tegan Cunningham	Retired	
2 November 2023	Tamara Luke	Retired	
3 November 2023	Catherine Brown	Retired	
10 November 2023	Janet Baird	Delisted	
10 November 2023	Sarah Perkins	Delisted	

== 2024 player squad ==
2024 Hawthorn Football Club squad
Senior list		Rookie list	Coaching staff
1 Emily Bates (C); 2 Eliza West (VC); 3 Greta Bodey; 4 Mattea Breed; 5 Jasmine Fleming; 6 Hayley McLaughlin; 7 Aileen Gilroy; 8 Tahlia Fellows; 9 Charlotte Baskaran; 10 Kaitlyn Ashmore; 11 Jenna Richardson; 12 Louise Stephenson; 14 Casey Sherriff; 15 Bridget Deed	16 Ainslie Kemp; 17 Mackenzie Eardley; 18 Tilly Lucas-Rodd; 19 Bridie Hipwell; 20 Laura Elliot; 21 Sophie Locke; 22 Laura Stone; 23 Jess Vukic; 24 Tamara Smith; 25 Emily Everist; 27 Mikayla Williamson; 28 Sophie Butterworth; 31 Lucy Wales; 41 Kristy Stratton	13 Áine McDonagh; 26 Casey Dumont	Head coach: Daniel Webster; Assistant coaches: Steph Binder (defence); Keegan Brooksby (midfield); Mitch Cashion (forwards); Jack Gunston (specialist); Michael Ericson (development); Kathryn Chatelier (development); Cam McKinlay (development); Matt Dussin (development); Catherine Brown (development); Legend: (c) Captain(s); (vc) Vice-captain(s); Updated: 15 November 2024; Source(s): Hawthorn AFLW, AFL Women's

== Season ==
=== Pre-season ===
Rd	Date and local time	Opponent	Scores (Hawthorn's scores indicated in bold)			Venue	Attendance	Report
Rd	Date and local time	Opponent	Home	Away	Result	Venue	Attendance	Report
—	Saturday, 10 August (1:00 pm)	Essendon	**9.1 (55)**	6.4 (40)	Won by 15 points	Caulfield Grammar	—	Report
—	Saturday, 17 August (2:00 pm)	Sydney	4.4 (28)	**11.11 (77)**	Won by 49 points	Sydney Cricket Ground	—	Report

=== Home & Away season ===
Rd	Date and local time	Opponent	Scores (Hawthorn's scores indicated in bold)			Venue	Attendance	Record	Report
Rd	Date and local time	Opponent	Home	Away	Result	Venue	Attendance	Record	Report
1	Sunday, 1 September (1:05 pm)	Carlton	**9.12 (66)**	4.4 (28)	Won by 38 points	Kinetic Stadium	2,794	1–0	Report
2	Saturday, 7 September (1:05 pm)	Collingwood	3.8 (26)	**11.7 (73)**	Won by 47 points	Victoria Park	3,283	2–0	Report
3	Sunday, 15 September (1:05 pm)	Adelaide	9.4 (58)	**4.8 (32)**	Lost by 26 points	Thomas Farms Oval	3,142	2–1	Report
4	Saturday, 21 September (2:05 pm)	St Kilda	2.5 (17)	**11.8 (74)**	Won by 57 points	RSEA Park	2,822	3–1	Report
5	Thursday, 26 September (7:15 pm)	Geelong	9.7 (61)	**12.7 (79)**	Won by 18 points	GMHBA Stadium	2,771	4–1	Report
6	Wednesday, 2 October (5:15 pm)	Gold Coast	**4.11 (35)**	3.4 (22)	Won by 13 points	Kinetic Stadium	2,291	5–1	Report
6	Sunday, 6 October (5:05 pm)	Fremantle	3.7 (25)	**5.4 (34)**	Won by 9 points	Fremantle Community Bank Oval	2,259	6–1	Report
7	Saturday, 12 October (1:05 pm)	West Coast	**11.8 (74)**	1.2 (8)	Won by 66 points	Kinetic Stadium	2,357	7–1	Report
8	Saturday, 19 October (1:05 pm)	Greater Western Sydney	**9.7 (61)**	3.6 (24)	Won by 37 points	Kinetic Stadium	2,106	8–1	Report
9	Thursday, 24 October (7:45 pm)	Melbourne	**3.5 (23)**	2.5 (17)	Won by 6 points	Cazalys Stadium	2,602	9–1	Report
10	Sunday, 3 November (3:05 pm)	Richmond	3.5 (23)	**6.10 (46)**	Won by 23 points	Swinburne Centre	2,087	10–1	Report

==== Ladder ====
Pos	Team	Pld	W	L	D	PF	PA	PP	Pts	Qualification
1	North Melbourne (P)	11	10	0	1	656	208	315.4	42	Finals series
**2**	Hawthorn	**11**	**10**	**1**	**0**	**597**	**309**	**193.2**	40	Finals series
3	Brisbane	11	9	2	0	611	335	182.4	36	Finals series
4	Adelaide	11	8	3	0	494	285	173.3	32	Finals series
5	Fremantle	11	8	3	0	404	297	136.0	32	Finals series
6	Port Adelaide	11	7	4	0	431	364	118.4	28	Finals series
7	Richmond	11	6	4	1	442	337	131.2	26	Finals series
8	Essendon	11	6	4	1	376	359	104.7	26	Finals series
9	Melbourne	11	6	5	0	369	420	87.9	24	
10	Geelong	11	4	6	1	479	437	109.6	18	
11	St Kilda	11	4	7	0	379	396	95.7	16	
12	Western Bulldogs	11	4	7	0	291	461	63.1	16	
13	West Coast	11	4	7	0	320	509	62.9	16	
14	Carlton	11	4	7	0	266	532	50.0	16	
15	Sydney	11	3	8	0	395	538	73.4	12	
16	Greater Western Sydney	11	1	9	1	374	531	70.4	6	
17	Gold Coast	11	1	9	1	311	569	54.7	6	
18	Collingwood	11	1	10	0	245	553	44.3	4	

Source: afl.com.au
Rules for classification: 1) points; 2) percentage; 3) number of points for
(P) Premiers

=== Finals series ===
Rd	Date and local time	Opponent	Scores (Hawthorn's scores indicated in bold)			Venue	Attendance	Report
Rd	Date and local time	Opponent	Home	Away	Result	Venue	Attendance	Report
Qualifying final	Sunday, 10 November (1:05 pm)	Brisbane	**4.8 (32)**	6.2 (38)	Lost by 6 points	IKON Park	4,985	Report
Semi-final	Saturday, 16 November (7:30 pm)	Port Adelaide	**6.13 (49)**	7.8 (50)	Lost by 1 point	IKON Park	3,680	Report

== Statistics ==
Correct as of finals week 2

Name	Position	Games	Kicks	Handballs	Disposals	Marks	Tackles	Hitouts	Goals	Behinds
Kaitlyn Ashmore	Midfielder	13	98	47	145	37	44	0	4	3
Charlotte Baskaran	Forward	5	13	23	36	1	16	0	3	1
Emily Bates	Midfielder	12	126	126	252	30	85	0	5	4
Greta Bodey	Forward	11	100	50	150	25	36	0	12	10
Mattea Breed	Midfielder	12	82	80	162	20	63	1	3	5
Sophie Butterworth	Forward	1	2	5	7	1	3	0	0	0
Mackenzie Eardley	Forward	10	51	25	76	22	37	15	4	8
Laura Elliott	Defender	11	57	25	82	21	14	0	0	0
Emily Everist	Defender	11	60	36	96	28	25	0	0	0
Tahlia Fellows	Forward	2	2	1	3	0	4	0	1	0
Jasmine Fleming	Midfielder	13	157	85	242	30	58	0	5	4
Aileen Gilroy	Forward	13	156	17	173	18	45	0	14	11
Bridie Hipwell	Forward	11	48	30	78	17	42	0	5	5
Ainslie Kemp	Defender	13	106	24	130	45	12	0	0	0
Sophie Locke	Forward	3	12	8	20	2	11	0	2	3
Tilly Lucas-Rodd	Defender	13	185	79	264	48	36	0	0	1
Áine McDonagh	Forward	13	94	37	131	40	28	11	16	19
Hayley McLaughlin	Forward	6	11	21	32	2	21	0	0	0
Jenna Richardson	Defender	13	104	66	170	70	28	0	0	0
Casey Sherriff	Midfielder	6	39	10	49	7	19	0	3	1
Tamara Smith	Defender	13	93	60	153	40	63	0	1	0
Louise Stephenson	Forward	8	39	24	63	9	28	9	5	3
Laura Stone	Forward	7	22	19	41	4	11	0	3	1
Kristy Stratton	Forward	3	7	10	17	3	7	0	1	0
Jess Vukic	Ruck	11	28	26	54	2	26	96	1	0
Lucy Wales	Ruck	13	83	72	155	30	58	336	0	1
Eliza West	Midfielder	13	106	179	285	16	102	0	4	1
Mikayla Williamson	Midfielder	13	72	60	132	24	46	0	3	1

== Goalkickers ==
Name	R1	R2	R3	R4	R5	R6		R7	R8	R9	R10	QF	SF	Total
Áine McDonagh	2	2	1	2	2	1	0	1	0	1	2	1	1	16
Aileen Gilroy	2	2	0	1	1	1	0	3	3	0	1	0	0	14
Greta Bodey	1	1	0	6	0	0	1	1	–	–	0	0	2	12
Emily Bates	1	–	1	0	0	0	0	2	1	0	0	0	0	5
Jasmine Fleming	0	0	0	0	1	0	1	0	1	1	0	0	1	5
Bridie Hipwell	0	1	0	1	–	0	–	0	2	1	0	0	0	5
Kaitlyn Ashmore	0	0	0	0	1	0	0	0	0	0	1	1	1	4
Mackenzie Eardley	–	0	0	0	2	0	0	–	–	0	1	1	0	4
Eliza West	0	1	–	0	0	1	1	1	0	0	0	0	0	4
Louise Stephenson	–	–	–	0	1	–	–	2	0	0	0	1	1	5
Charlotte Baskaran	–	1	0	–	–	–	–	–	2	–	–	–	–	3
Mattea Breed	1	1	1	0	0	0	–	0	0	0	0	0	0	3
Casey Sherriff	2	1	–	–	–	–	–	–	–	0	0	0	0	3
Laura Stone	0	0	0	0	3	0	0	–	–	–	–	–	–	3
Mikayla Williamson	0	1	0	0	0	1	0	0	0	0	1	0	0	3
Sophie Locke	–	–	–	–	–	–	1	1	0	–	–	–	–	2
Tahlia Fellows	–	–	–	–	1	0	–	–	–	–	–	–	–	1
Tamara Smith	0	0	1	0	0	0	0	0	0	0	0	0	0	1
Kristy Stratton	–	–	–	1	0	–	0	–	–	–	–	–	–	1
Jess Vukic	0	0	0	–	–	0	1	0	0	0	0	–	0	1

== Awards ==
Name	Award	Ref.
Aileen Gilroy	AFL Women's All-Australian team (1st selection)	
Tilly Lucas-Rodd	AFL Women's All-Australian team (1st selection)	
Jasmine Fleming	22under22 team (2nd selection)	
Eliza West	Hawthorn best and fairest (1st award – shared record)	
Lucy Wales	Hawthorn world class award (1st award – record)	
Emily Everist	Hawthorn competitor award (1st award – record)	
Ainslie Kemp	Hawthorn Unbreakable award (1st award – record)	
Emily Bates	Hawthorn best player in finals (1st award – shared record)	
Jasmine Fleming	Hawthorn best player in finals (1st award – shared record)	
Greta Bodey	Hawthorn players' player (1st award – record)	

== Milestones ==
Names in bold indicate Hawthorn only.

=== 50th game played ===
Round	Name	Opponent	Score	Ground
2	Aileen Gilroy	Collingwood	3.8 (26) – **11.7 (73)**	Victoria Park
2	Casey Sherriff	Collingwood	3.8 (26) – **11.7 (73)**	Victoria Park
Semi–final	Louise Stephenson	Port Adelaide	**6.13 (49)** – 7.8 (50)	IKON Park

=== 50th goal kicked ===
Round	Name	Opponent	Score	Ground
4	Greta Bodey	St Kilda	2.5 (17) – **11.8 (74)**	RSEA Park

=== Debuts ===
Round	Name	Opponent	Score	Ground
1	Casey Sherriff	Carlton	**9.12 (66)** – 4.4 (28)	Kinetic Stadium
1	**Laura Stone**	Carlton	**9.12 (66)** – 4.4 (28)	Kinetic Stadium
1	**Jess Vukic**	Carlton	**9.12 (66)** – 4.4 (28)	Kinetic Stadium
1	Eliza West	Carlton	**9.12 (66)** – 4.4 (28)	Kinetic Stadium
1	**Mikayla Williamson**	Carlton	**9.12 (66)** – 4.4 (28)	Kinetic Stadium
8	**Sophie Butterworth**	Greater Western Sydney	**9.7 (61)** – 3.6 (24)	Kinetic Stadium

=== First goals ===
Round	Name	Opponent	Score	Ground
1	**Mattea Breed**	Carlton	**9.12 (66)** – 4.4 (28)	Kinetic Stadium
1	Casey Sherriff	Carlton	**9.12 (66)** – 4.4 (28)	Kinetic Stadium
2	Eliza West	Collingwood	3.8 (26) – **11.7 (73)**	Victoria Park
2	**Mikayla Williamson**	Collingwood	3.8 (26) – **11.7 (73)**	Victoria Park
3	**Tamara Smith**	Adelaide	9.4 (58) – **4.8 (32)**	Thomas Farms Oval
5	**Mackenzie Eardley**	Geelong	9.7 (61) – **12.7 (79)**	GMHBA Stadium
5	**Jasmine Fleming**	Geelong	9.7 (61) – **12.7 (79)**	GMHBA Stadium
5	Louise Stephenson	Geelong	9.7 (61) – **12.7 (79)**	GMHBA Stadium
5	**Laura Stone**	Geelong	9.7 (61) – **12.7 (79)**	GMHBA Stadium

== Injury list ==
Name	Injury	Status	Source	Match	Injury date	Return date
Mackenzie Eardley	Quad			Pre-season vs. Sydney	17 August 2024	7 September 2024
Greta Bodey	Hand			—	27 August 2024	1 September 2024
Sophie Locke	Knee			—	27 August 2024	7 September 2024
Kristy Stratton	Hamstring			—	27 August 2024	17 September 2024
Áine McDonagh	Shoulder			Round 1 vs. Carlton	1 September 2024	7 September 2024
Emily Bates	Calf			—	7 September 2024	13 September 2024
Áine McDonagh	Wrist			Round 2 vs. Collingwood	7 September 2024	13 September 2024
Casey Sherriff	Ankle			Round 2 vs. Collingwood	7 September 2024	22 October 2024
Bridie Hipwell	Lower leg			Round 3 vs. Adelaide	15 September 2024	1 October 2024
Mattea Breed	Foot			Round 6 vs. Gold Coast	2 October 2024	9 October 2024
Mackenzie Eardley	Concussion			Round 6 vs. Fremantle	6 October 2024	22 October 2024
Kristy Stratton	Ankle			Round 6 vs. Fremantle	6 October 2024	3 November 2024
Laura Stone	Ankle			Round 6 vs. Fremantle	6 October 2024	
Greta Bodey	Toe			—	15 October 2024	29 October 2024
Lucy Wales	Lower leg			Round 10 vs. Richmond	3 November 2024	6 November 2024
