= 2022 (S7) Hawthorn Football Club women's season =

Hawthorn Football Club's first season in the AFL Women's

Hawthorn Football Club
2022 (S7) season
- President: Jeff Kennett
- Coach: Bec Goddard
- Captain: Tilly Lucas-Rodd
- Home ground: Box Hill City Oval; Frankston Park
- Record: 3–7 (15th)
- Best and fairest: Tilly Lucas-Rodd
- Leading goalkicker: Jess Duffin (7)

The 2022 season 7 Hawthorn Football Club season was the club's first season in the AFL Women's. The team played their home games at the Box Hill City Oval and Frankston Park. They were led by coach Bec Goddard and captain Tilly Lucas-Rodd.

== Club summary ==
2022 AFL Women's season 7 was the seventh season of the AFL Women's competition since its inception in 2017. It is the first season contested by Hawthorn. KFC and Nature Valley are the club's two major partners.

== Season summary ==
12 August 2021 – Bec Goddard is appointed as the club's inaugural coach.

21 January 2022 – Mitch Cashion is appointed as the club's list manager.

5 May 2022 – Hawthorn announces they have signed Olivia Knowles as High performance manager, and Keegan Brooksby as strategy and opposition coach.

5 May 2022 – Hawthorn announces that KFC has signed on as a partner for four seasons.

10 June 2022 – Nature Valley signs with Hawthorn as a partner.

10 June 2022 – Cherie O'Neill, Lou Wotton, David McKay, and Brady Grey are announced as assistant coaches.

8 August 2022 – Tilly Lucas-Rodd is announced as the clubs inaugural captain, Jess Duffin is appointed the vice–captain, while Louise Stephenson and Tamara Luke round out the leadership group.

14 August 2022 – Due to ticket demand, Hawthorn's round 1 game against Essendon is moved to Marvel Stadium.

18 October 2022 – Vice-captain Jess Duffin announces her retirement at the end of the season.

== Playing list changes ==
=== Trades ===
3 June 2022	To Hawthorn Pick 18, 2022 AFL Women's draft	To Richmond Pick 30, 2022 AFL Women's draft Pick 33, 2022 AFL Women's draft
7 June 2022	To Hawthorn Pick 51, 2022 AFL Women's draft Pick 59, 2022 AFL Women's draft	To Melbourne Pick 45, 2022 AFL Women's draft Pick 80, 2022 AFL Women's draft
7 June 2022	To Hawthorn Pick 52, 2022 AFL Women's draft	To Richmond Pick 59, 2022 AFL Women's draft Pick 62, 2022 AFL Women's draft
8 June 2022	To Hawthorn Kaitlyn Ashmore	To North Melbourne Pick 51, 2022 AFL Women's draft
8 June 2022	To Hawthorn Pick 25, 2022 AFL Women's draft Pick 28, 2022 AFL Women's draft Pick 55, 2022 AFL Women's draft	To Carlton Pick 18, 2022 AFL Women's draft
8 June 2022	To Hawthorn Pick 26, 2022 AFL Women's draft Pick 72, 2022 AFL Women's draft	To North Melbourne Pick 28, 2022 AFL Women's draft Pick 52, 2022 AFL Women's draft Pick 55, 2022 AFL Women's draft

=== Free agency ===
==== Pre-list signing ====
Date	Player	F/A Type	Old club	Deal	Ref
21 February 2022	Bridgit Deed	—	Eastern Ranges		
22 March 2022	Zoe Barbakos	—	Sandringham Dragons		
31 March 2022	Sophie Locke	—	Port Melbourne		
3 May 2022	Dominique Carbone	—	Hawthorn VFLW		
11 May 2022	Tegan Cunningham	—	Hawthorn VFLW		
11 May 2022	Eliza Shannon	—	Hawthorn VFLW		
24 May 2022	Tahlia Fellows	—	Casey		
24 May 2022	Tamara Luke	—	Hawthorn VFLW		
24 May 2022	Jenna Richardson	—	Hawthorn VFLW		
2 June 2022	Ainslie Kemp	—	Hawthorn VFLW		
2 June 2022	Isabelle Porter	—	Hawthorn VFLW		
2 June 2022	Catherine Brown	—	Eastlake Demons		
9 June 2022	Tamara Smith	—	Geelong (VFLW)		
9 June 2022	Kate McCarthy	Delisted	St Kilda		

==== AFLW club signings ====
Date	Player	F/A Type	Old club	Deal	Ref
16 May 2022	Tilly Lucas-Rodd	—	St Kilda		
16 May 2022	Jess Duffin	—	North Melbourne		
16 May 2022	Janet Baird	—	Gold Coast		
16 May 2022	Akec Makur Chuot	—	Richmond		
17 May 2022	Sarah Perkins	—	Gold Coast		
17 May 2022	Louise Stephenson	—	Greater Western Sydney		
30 May 2022	Aileen Gilroy	—	North Melbourne		

==== Rookie signings ====
Date	Player	F/A Type	Old club	Deal	Ref
28 June 2022	Áine McDonagh		Galway GAA		

=== Draft ===
Round	Overall pick	Player	Recruited from	ref
1	2	Jasmine Fleming	Oakleigh Chargers	
1	6	Mackenzie Eardley	Dandenong Stingrays	
1	9	Charlotte Baskaren	Western Jets	
1	10	Bridie Hipwell	Sandringham Dragons	
1	22	Lucy Wales	Casey Demons	
1	25	Emily Everist	Bendigo Pioneers	
1	26	Laura Elliot	Western Jets	

== 2022 (S7) player squad ==
2022 (S7) Hawthorn Football Club squad
Senior list		Rookie list	Coaching staff
1 Tegan Cunningham; 2 Janet Baird; 3 Isabelle Porter; 4 Dominique Carbone; 5 Jasmine Fleming; 6 Zoe Barbakos; 7 Aileen Gilroy; 8 Tahlia Fellows; 9 Kate McCarthy; 10 Kaitlyn Ashmore; 11 Jenna Richardson; 12 Louise Stephenson; 14 Charlotte Baskaran; 15 Bridget Deed; 16 Ainslie Kemp	17 Mackenizie Eardley; 18 Tilly Lucas-Rodd (c); 19 Bridie Hipwell; 20 Laura Elliot; 21 Sophie Locke; 22 Tamara Luke; 23 Sarah Perkins; 24 Tamara Smith; 25 Emily Everist; 27 Jess Duffin (vc); 31 Lucy Wales; 33 Eliza Shannon; 34 Akec Makur Chuot; 42 Catherine Brown	13 Áine McDonagh	Head coach: Bec Goddard; Assistant coaches: Brady Grey (defence); David Mackay (midfield); Lou Wotton (forwards); Cherie O'Neill (VFLW/development); Keegan Brooksby (strategy & opposition); Legend: (c) Captain(s); (vc) Vice-captain(s); Updated: 24 October 2022; Source(s): Hawthorn AFLW, AFL Women's

== Pre–season ==
Rd	Date and local time	Opponent	Scores (Hawthorn's scores indicated in bold)			Venue	Report
Rd	Date and local time	Opponent	Home	Away	Result	Venue	Report
1	Sunday, August 14 (10:30 am)	Richmond	8.4 (52)	**1.2 (8)**	Lost by 44 points	Melbourne Cricket Ground	Report

== Home & Away season ==
Rd	Date and local time	Opponent	Scores (Hawthorn's scores indicated in bold)			Venue	Attendance	Record	Report
Rd	Date and local time	Opponent	Home	Away	Result	Venue	Attendance	Record	Report
1	Saturday, 27 August (7:10 pm)	Essendon	7.11 (53)	**4.3 (27)**	Lost by 26 points	Marvel Stadium	12,092	0–1	
2	Sunday, 4 September (4:10 pm)	St Kilda	**1.4 (10)**	9.9 (63)	Lost by 53 points	Box Hill City Oval	2,262	0–2	
3	Sunday, 11 September (4:10 pm)	Richmond	7.2 (44)	**1.3 (9)**	Lost by 35 points	Punt Road Oval	2,031	0–3	
4	Saturday, 17 September (3:10 pm)	Western Bulldogs	**1.1 (7)**	6.1 (37)	Lost by 30 points	Box Hill City Oval	1,108	0–4	
5	Friday, 23 September (5:10 pm)	Sydney	4.7 (31)	**5.5 (35)**	Won by 4 points	Punt Road Oval	2,173	1–4	
6	Friday, 30 September (6:10 pm)	West Coast	**6.8 (44)**	6.5 (41)	Won by 3 points	Frankston Park	1,565	2–4	
7	Saturday, 8 October (7:10 pm)	Port Adelaide	**4.5 (29)**	1.10 (16)	Won by 13 points	Frankston Park	2,029	3–4	
8	Sunday, 16 October (3:10 pm)	Greater Western Sydney	4.10 (34)	**5.3 (33)**	Lost by 1 point	Henson Park	2,006	3–5	
9	Saturday, 22 October (7:10 pm)	Brisbane	**1.1 (7)**	9.7 (61)	Lost by 54 points	Frankston Park	2,164	3–6	
10	Saturday, 29 October (4:10 pm)	Fremantle	7.7 (49)	**7.2 (44)**	Lost by 5 points	Fremantle Oval	1,302	3–7	

=== Ladder ===
Pos	Team	Pld	W	L	D	PF	PA	PP	Pts	Qualification
1	Brisbane	10	9	1	0	545	193	282.4	36	Finals series
2	Melbourne (P)	10	9	1	0	519	184	282.1	36	Finals series
3	Adelaide	10	8	2	0	412	232	177.6	32	Finals series
4	Richmond	10	7	2	1	321	217	147.9	30	Finals series
5	Geelong	10	7	3	0	384	222	173.0	28	Finals series
6	Collingwood	10	7	3	0	289	244	118.4	28	Finals series
7	Western Bulldogs	10	7	3	0	326	297	109.8	28	Finals series
8	North Melbourne	10	6	3	1	382	229	166.8	26	Finals series
9	Gold Coast	10	5	5	0	309	351	88.0	20	
10	Essendon	10	4	6	0	349	354	98.6	16	
11	Greater Western Sydney	10	4	6	0	265	420	63.1	16	
12	Fremantle	10	3	6	1	267	400	66.8	14	
13	St Kilda	10	3	7	0	307	373	82.3	12	
14	Carlton	10	2	6	2	253	342	74.0	12	
**15**	Hawthorn	**10**	**3**	**7**	**0**	**245**	**429**	**57.1**	12	
16	West Coast	10	2	8	0	239	449	53.2	8	
17	Port Adelaide	10	1	8	1	255	361	70.6	6	
18	Sydney	10	0	10	0	207	577	35.9	0	

Source: womens.afl
Rules for classification: 1) points; 2) percentage; 3) number of points for
(P) Premiers

== Awards, records and milestones ==
=== Club records ===
- Highest score: 7.2, 6.8 (44)
- Lowest score: 1.1 (7)
- Biggest win: 13 points
- Biggest lose: 54 points
- Highest score conceded: 9.9 (63)
- Lowest score conceded: 4.7 (31)
- Consecutive wins: 3
- Consecutive loses: 4
- Most games played: Charlotte Baskaran, Catherine Brown, Jess Duffin, Aileen Gilroy, Akec Makur Chuot Tilly Lucas-Rodd, Tamara Smith, Lucy Wales – 10
- Most goals: Jess Duffin – 7
- Most behinds: Aileen Gilroy – 5
- Most disposals: Tilly Lucas-Rodd – 176
- Most kicks: Tilly Lucas-Rodd – 118
- Most handballs: Tilly Lucas-Rodd – 58
- Most marks: Kaitlyn Ashmore, Jess Duffin, Akec Makur Chuot – 25
- Most hitouts: Lucy Wales – 168
- Most tackles: Tilly Lucas-Rodd – 84
- Most rebound 50s: Catherine Brown – 57
- Most inside 50s: Aileen Gilroy: 35
- Most clearances: Tilly Lucas-Rodd: 41
- Most contested possessions: Tilly Lucas-Rodd – 97
- Most uncontested possessions: Tilly Lucas-Rodd – 70
- Most contested marks: Jess Duffin – 12
- Most marks inside 50: Jess Duffin – 10
- Most one perceneters: Catherine Brown, Tegan Cunningham, Lucy Wales – 22
- Most goal assists: Tahlia Fellows, Aileen Gilroy, Áine McDonagh – 3
- Most games coached: Bec Goddard – 10
- Most home and away games coached: Bec Goddard – 10
- Most games won as coach: Bec Goddard – 3
- Most home and away games won as coach: Bec Goddard – 3
- Most goals in a season: Jess Duffin – 7
- Most behinds in a season: Aileen Gilroy – 5
- Most disposals in a season: Tilly Lucas-Rodd – 176
- Most kicks in a season: Tilly Lucas-Rodd – 118
- Most handballs in a season: Tilly Lucas-Rodd – 58
- Most marks in a season: Kaitlyn Ashmore, Jess Duffin, Akec Makur Chuot – 25
- Most hitouts in a season: Lucy Wales – 168
- Most tackles in a season: Tilly Lucas-Rodd – 84
- Most rebound 50s in a season: Catherine Brown – 57
- Most inside 50s in a season: Aileen Gilroy: 35
- Most clearances in a season: Tilly Lucas-Rodd: 41
- Most contested possessions in a season: Tilly Lucas-Rodd – 97
- Most uncontested possessions in a season: Tilly Lucas-Rodd – 70
- Most contested marks in a season: Jess Duffin – 12
- Most marks inside 50 in a season: Jess Duffin – 10
- Most one perceneters in a season: Catherine Brown, Tegan Cunningham, Lucy Wales – 22
- Most goal assists in a season: Tahlia Fellows, Aileen Gilroy, Áine McDonagh – 3
- Most goals in a game: Jess Duffin, Tahlia Fellows – 3
- Most behinds in a game: Kaitlyn Ashmore, Jess Duffin, Tahlia Fellows, Aileen Gilroy – 2
- Most disposals in a game: Tilly Lucas-Rodd – 26
- Most kicks in a game: Jasmine Fleming – 19
- Most handballs in a game: Tilly Lucas-Rodd – 11
- Most marks in a game: Kaitlyn Ashmore – 6
- Most hitouts in a game: Lucy Wales – 24
- Most tackles in a game: Tilly Lucas-Rodd, Tamara Smith – 13
- Most rebound 50s in a game: Catherine Brown – 11
- Most inside 50s in a game: Aileen Gilroy – 8
- Most contested possessions in a game: Tilly Lucas-Rodd – 15
- Most uncontested possessions in a game: Akec Makur Chuot – 12
- Most contested marks in a game: Jess Duffin, Áine McDonagh – 3
- Most marks inside 50 in a game: Jess Duffin – 3
- Most one percenters in a game: Emily Everist – 7
- Most goal assists in a game: Ainslie Kemp, Tahlia Fellows, Áine McDonagh – 2

=== Milestones ===
Round 1

- Kaitlyn Ashmore – 50th AFLW game, Hawthorn debut
- Zoe Barbakos – AFLW debut, 1st AFLW goal
- Charlotte Baskaran – AFLW debut
- Catherine Brown – AFLW debut
- Dominique Carbone – AFLW debut
- Bridgit Deed – AFLW debut
- Mackenzie Eardley – AFLW debut
- Tahlia Fellows – AFLW debut
- Jasmine Fleming – AFLW debut
- Sophie Locke – AFLW debut, 1st AFLW goal
- Eliza Shannon – AFLW debut
- Lucy Wales – AFLW debut
- Tamara Smith – AFLW debut
- Tegan Cunningham – Hawthorn debut
- Jess Duffin – Hawthorn debut
- Aileen Gilroy – Hawthorn debut
- Tilly Lucas-Rodd – Hawthorn debut
- Tamara Luke – Hawthorn debut
- Akec Makur Chuot – Hawthorn debut
- Sarah Perkins – Hawthorn debut, 1st goal for Hawthorn
- Louise Stephenson – Hawthorn debut
- Bec Goddard – 1st game as Hawthorn coach

Round 2

- Aileen Gilroy – 1st AFLW goal
- Kate McCarthy – Hawthorn debut

Round 3

- Charlotte Baskaran – 1st AFLW goal
- Laura Elliott – AFLW debut
- Bridie Hipwell – AFLW debut
- Isabelle Porter – AFLW debut
- Ainslie Kemp – Hawthorn debut

Round 4

- Kaitlyn Ashmore – 1st goal for Hawthorn
- Áine McDonagh – AFLW debut

Round 5

- Tahlia Fellows – 1st AFLW goal
- Emily Everist – AFLW debut
- Bec Goddard – 1st win as Hawthorn coach

Round 6

- Jess Duffin – 1st goal for Hawthorn
- Tilly Lucas-Rodd – 1st goal for Hawthorn
- Jenna Richardson – AFLW debut
- Áine McDonagh – 1st AFLW goal

Round 7

- Tilly Lucas-Rodd – 50th AFLW game
- Bridie Hipwell – 1st AFLW goal

Round 8

- Akec Makur Chuot – 1st goal for Hawthorn

Round 9

- Janet Baird – Hawthorn debut
