= Niamh Martin =

Australian rules footballer (born 2000)

Naamh Martin

Personal information
- Full name: Naamh Martin
- Born: 25 June 2001 (age 25)
- Debut: Round 7, 2023, North Melbourne vs. Port Adelaide, at Arden Street Oval
- Height: 174 cm (5 ft 9 in)
- Position: Forward

Club information
- Current club: Hawthorn

Playing career^{1}
Years	Club	Games (Goals)
2023–2025	North Melbourne	16 (8)
2026–	Hawthorn	0 (0)
Total		16 (8)

International team honours^{2}
Years	Team	Games (Goals)
2026	Ireland	1 (0)
- ^{1} Playing statistics correct to the end of 2025.^{2} Representative statistics correct as of 2026.

Niamh Martin (born 25 June 2001) is a Gaelic football and Australian rules football player. Martin was a member of the Tipperary team that won the 2019 All-Ireland Intermediate Ladies' Football Championship. Martin was recruited to the North Melbourne Football Club for its 2023 AFL Women's (AFLW) team in March 2023. She, along with Aishling Moloney and Anna Rose Kennedy, was one of three Tipperary players recruited to play AFLW in 2023; at the time, it was estimated that the number of Irish AFLW players in that year could reach 30. In the 26 November 2023 match between North Melbourne and Adelaide Football Club Martin sustained an eye injury, but it was assessed as not a concussion, and she was allowed to play in the 2023 AFL Women's Grand Final. In an assessment of player performance in the 2023 AFL Women's Grand Final published in Melbourne newspaper The Age, Martin was described "another player who will be better for the grand final experience".

== Statistics ==
Updated to the end of 2025.

Legend
G	Goals	K	Kicks	D	Disposals	T	Tackles
B	Behinds	H	Handballs	M	Marks

Season	Team	No.	Games	Totals							Averages (per game)							Votes
Season	Team	No.	Games	G	B	K	H	D	M	T	G	B	K	H	D	M	T	Votes
2023	North Melbourne	28	7	1	2	15	13	28	8	14	0.1	0.3	2.1	1.9	4.0	1.1	2.0	0
2024	North Melbourne	28	9	7	6	50	28	78	9	23	0.8	0.7	5.6	3.1	8.7	1.0	2.6	0
2025	North Melbourne	28	0	—	—	—	—	—	—	—	—	—	—	—	—	—	—	0
Career			16	8	8	65	41	106	17	37	0.5	0.5	4.1	2.6	6.6	1.1	2.3	0

== Honours and achievements ==
Team

- Minor premiership (North Melbourne): 2024
