= Najwa Allen =

Australian rules footballer (born 1994)

Personal information
- Full name: Najwa Allen
- Born: 25 June 1994 (age 32)
- Original team: Norwood (SANFLW) / Eastlake (NEAFLW)
- Draft: No. 37, 2019 national draft
- Debut: Round 1, 2020, Adelaide vs. Brisbane, at Hickey Park
- Height: 177 cm (5 ft 10 in)
- Position: Defender

Club information
- Current club: Hawthorn

Playing career^{1}
Years	Club	Games (Goals)
2020–2024	Adelaide	45 (0)
2025–	Hawthorn	7 (0)
Total		52 (0)
- ^{1} Playing statistics correct to the end of 2025.

Career highlights
- AFL Women's premiership player: 2022 (S6); SANFLW Best and Fairest: 2019

Najwa Allen (born 25 June 1994) is an Australian rules footballer who plays for Hawthorn in the AFL Women's (AFLW). She was a premiership player with Adelaide prior to being traded at the end of 2024.

== Junior career ==
Born in Canberra, Australia, Allen represented Eastlake Demons in the NEAFL before moving to South Australia to play in the highly regarded SANFL Women's league. After the 2019 season playing for Norwood in the SANFLW competition, Allen was awarded the leagues best and fairest. She was then taken by AFLW club Adelaide Crows with Pick 37 in the 2019 draft.

== AFL Women's career ==
Making her debut in Round 1, 2020, Allen has become a reliable defender for the Crows, running off half back. One of her strengths is the ability to kick with both feet and change the angles to create space for her side. Playing every game in 2021, Allen was part of the Crows side which made the 2021 Grand Final. She became a premiership player the following season when Adelaide defeated Melbourne in the 2022 season 6 Grand Final.

In 2024 AFL Women's season, Allen was reduced to only one game as she battled with consistently troubling hamstring issues. Searching for a fresh start, she requested a trade to Hawthorn. The move was completed on 10 December in a trade involving four clubs.

== Statistics ==
Updated to the end of 2025.

Legend
G	Goals	K	Kicks	D	Disposals	T	Tackles
B	Behinds	H	Handballs	M	Marks
#	Played in that season's premiership team

Season	Team	No.	Games	Totals							Averages (per game)							Votes
Season	Team	No.	Games	G	B	K	H	D	M	T	G	B	K	H	D	M	T	Votes
2020	Adelaide	8	5	0	0	25	22	47	6	4	0.0	0.0	5.0	4.4	9.4	1.2	0.8	0
2021	Adelaide	8	11	0	0	79	45	124	20	23	0.0	0.0	7.2	4.1	11.3	1.8	2.1	0
2022 (S6)^{#}	Adelaide	8	10	0	0	63	31	94	13	12	0.0	0.0	6.3	3.1	9.4	1.3	1.2	0
2022 (S7)	Adelaide	8	12	0	0	67	33	100	11	21	0.0	0.0	5.6	2.8	8.3	0.9	1.8	0
2023	Adelaide	8	6	0	0	48	34	82	12	12	0.0	0.0	8.0	5.7	13.7	2.0	2.0	0
2024	Adelaide	8	1	0	1	1	2	3	0	1	0.0	1.0	1.0	2.0	3.0	0.0	1.0	0
2025	Hawthorn	4	7	0	1	50	21	71	19	2	0.0	0.1	7.1	3.0	10.1	2.7	0.3	0
Career			52	0	2	333	188	521	81	75	0.0	0.0	6.4	3.6	10.0	1.6	1.4	0

== Honours and achievements ==
Team

- AFL Women's premiership player (Adelaide): 2022 (S6)
- 3× Minor premiership (Adelaide): 2021, 2022 (S6), 2023

Individual

- SANFLW Best and Fairest: 2019
