= Jacqui Dupuy =

Australian rules footballer

Personal information
- Full name: Jacqueline Dupuy
- Born: 9 July 1994 (age 32)
- Original team: Cairns Saints/Maroochydore (QAFLW)
- Debut: Round 1, 2022 (S6), Gold Coast vs. Greater Western Sydney, at Great Barrier Reef Arena
- Height: 181 cm (5 ft 11 in)
- Position: Key Forward

Club information
- Current club: Hawthorn
- Number: 38

Playing career^{1}
Years	Club	Games (Goals)
2022 (S6)–2025	Gold Coast	49 (37)
2026–	Hawthorn	0 (0)
Total		49 (37)
- ^{1} Playing statistics correct to the end of 2025.

Jacqueline Dupuy (born 9 July 1994) is an Australian rules footballer playing for the Hawthorn Football Club in the AFL Women's (AFLW).

== Football career ==
Dupuy is originally from Bendigo, Victoria, a talented junior netballer she moved to Cairns at the age of 18 to further her progression in the sport. There she participated in the Cairns Netball Association premiership-winning Cairns Saints and the Northern Marlins. Playing both netball and football for Cairns Saints she gradually switched her focus to Australian rules football due primarily to the welcoming environment of the football club.

Dupuy moved to the Sunshine Coast at age 27 to play for Maroochydore to further her career opportunities.

Dupuy was signed by the Suns in October 2021 and elevated to the senior list in 2026 as an injury replacement. She made her AFLW debut for the Suns in round 1 of 2022 season 6 and kicked her first AFLW goal in round 2.

== Statistics ==
Updated to the end of 2025

Legend
G	Goals	K	Kicks	D	Disposals	T	Tackles
B	Behinds	H	Handballs	M	Marks

Season	Team	No.	Games	Totals							Averages (per game)							Votes
Season	Team	No.	Games	G	B	K	H	D	M	T	G	B	K	H	D	M	T	Votes
2022 (S6)	Gold Coast	27	9	2	0	40	19	59	8	17	0.2	0.0	4.4	2.1	6.6	0.9	1.9	0
2022 (S7)	Gold Coast	27	10	7	5	61	43	104	21	28	0.7	0.5	6.1	4.3	10.4	2.1	2.8	1
2023	Gold Coast	27	11	13	7	93	54	147	40	25	1.2	0.6	8.5	4.9	13.4	3.6	2.3	4
2024	Gold Coast	27	10	8	7	62	22	84	35	19	0.8	0.7	6.2	2.2	8.4	3.5	1.9	0
2025	Gold Coast	27	9	7	7	61	35	96	19	24	0.8	0.8	6.8	3.9	10.7	2.1	2.7	0
Career			49	37	26	317	173	490	123	113	0.8	0.5	6.5	3.5	10.0	2.5	2.3	5
