= Nat Exon =

Australian rules footballer

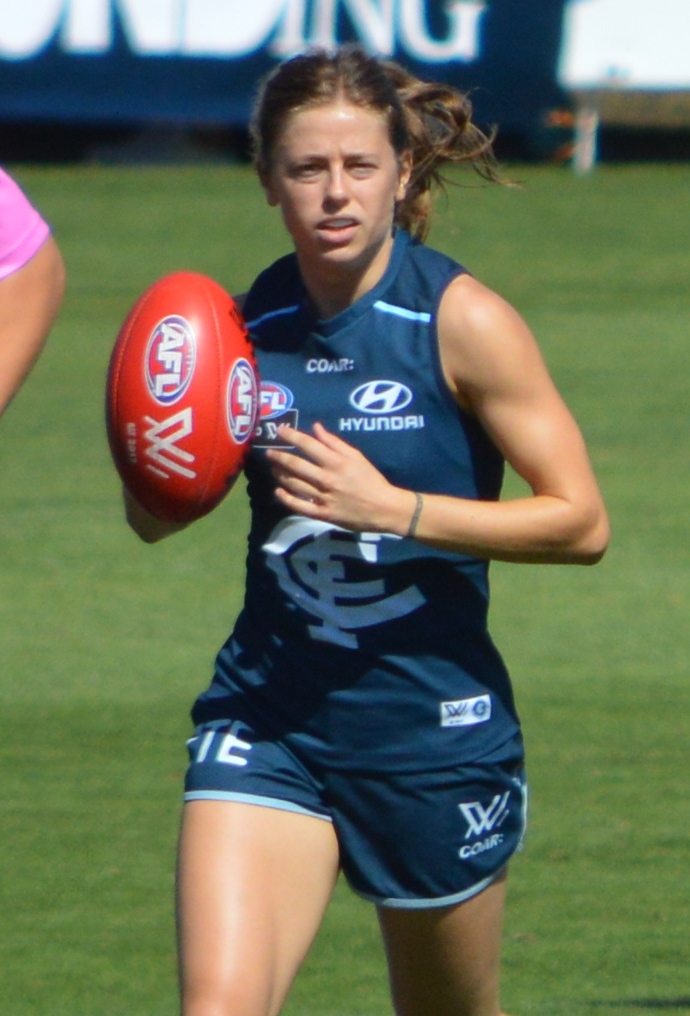
- Exon with Carlton in March 2017

Personal information
- Full name: Natalie Exon
- Nicknames: Nat, Exxy
- Born: 7 December 1992 (age 33)
- Original team: Darebin Falcons (VWFL)
- Draft: Rookie player, 2016
- Debut: Round 1, 2017, Carlton vs. Collingwood, at Princes Park
- Height: 162 cm (5 ft 4 in)
- Position: Midfield

Playing career^{1}
Years	Club	Games (Goals)
2017	Carlton	5 (0)
2018–2019	Brisbane	14 (6)
2020–2024	St Kilda	34 (17)
2025	Hawthorn	3 (0)
Total		56 (23)
- ^{1} Playing statistics correct to the end of 2025.

Natalie Exon (born 7 December 1992) is an Australian rules footballer who most recently played for the Hawthorn Football Club in the AFL Women's.

== Early life ==
Exon was born in 1992. She was playing for the Darebin Falcons when she was drafted.

== AFL Women's career ==
Exon was recruited by Carlton as a rookie player before the 2017 season. She made her debut in the Blues' inaugural game against Collingwood at Princes Park on 3 February 2017. Exon's brother, Ryan, plays for the Coburg Lions in the men's VFL.

On 25 May 2017, Exon was, along with Bella Ayre, traded to Brisbane in a complex trade involving four teams, five players, and a draft pick.

In April 2019, Exon joined expansion club St Kilda along with fellow Brisbane player Kate McCarthy. It was revealed Exon had signed on with the Saints for one more year on 30 June 2021, tying her to the club until the end of the 2021/2022 season.

In October 2025, Exon was selected by Hawthorn as a top up player, and became the eighth player to have played for four different AFLW teams.

== Statistics ==
Updated to the end of 2025

Season	Team	No.	Games	Totals							Averages (per game)							Votes
Season	Team	No.	Games	G	B	K	H	D	M	T	G	B	K	H	D	M	T	Votes
2017	Carlton	15	5	0	3	24	20	44	9	17	0.0	0.6	4.8	4.0	8.8	1.8	3.4	0
2018	Brisbane	15	7	2	1	40	25	65	16	44	0.3	0.1	5.7	3.6	9.3	2.3	6.3	3
2019	Brisbane	15	7	4	2	66	42	108	22	45	0.6	0.3	9.4	6.0	15.4	3.1	6.4	3
2020	St Kilda	15	6	0	2	39	21	60	12	38	0.0	0.3	6.5	3.5	10.0	2.0	6.3	0
2021	St Kilda	15	5	1	1	18	18	36	5	16	0.2	0.2	3.6	3.6	7.2	1.0	3.2	0
2022 (S6)	St Kilda	15	4	1	1	23	14	37	3	12	0.3	0.3	5.8	3.5	9.3	0.8	3.0	1
2022 (S7)	St Kilda	15	6	1	0	23	20	43	6	36	0.2	0.0	3.8	3.3	7.2	1.0	6.0	0
2023	St Kilda	15	7	9	2	58	23	81	15	25	1.3	0.3	8.3	3.3	11.6	2.1	3.6	3
2024	St Kilda	15	6	5	2	30	24	54	11	24	0.8	0.3	5.0	4.0	9.0	1.8	4.0	0
2025	Hawthorn	29	3	0	0	10	7	17	3	11	0.0	0.0	3.3	2.3	5.7	1.0	3.7	0
Career			56	23	14	331	214	545	102	268	0.4	0.3	5.9	3.8	9.7	1.8	4.8	10
