= Hawthorn Football Club (AFL Women's) =

Names
- Full name: Hawthorn Football Club Limited
- Nickname(s): Hawks, The Family Club
- Motto: Spectemur Agendo

2025 season
- After finals: 5th
- Home-and-away season: 4th
- Leading goalkicker: Áine McDonagh (22 goals)

Club details
- Colours: Brown Gold
- Competition: AFL Women's
- President: Andrew Gowers
- CEO: Ash Klein
- Coach: Daniel Webster
- Captain: Emily Bates
- Premierships: VFLW (1): 2018
- Ground: Kennedy Community Centre
- Former grounds: Box Hill City Oval (2022)
- Frankston Park (2022–2025)

Other information
- Official website: hawthornfc.com.au

The Hawthorn Football Club, nicknamed the Hawks, is an Australian rules football club based in Melbourne, Victoria. The club plays in the AFL Women's (AFLW) and, from 2018 until 2022, the VFL Women's (VFLW). The team is associated with the Hawthorn men's team.

== History ==
=== 2021–present: Foundation ===
In 2016, The AFL announced the creation of the AFL Women's league with all 18 clubs asked to submit a bid to become one of the inaugural clubs. Hawthorn would be one of five clubs who chose not to submit a bid. In 2017, following a successful debut season the AFL would announce the league would expand from the 2019 season. Unlike 2016, Hawthorn would this time submit a bid to join the league. They would ultimately be unsuccessful.

On 12 August 2021, Hawthorn along with Essendon, Port Adelaide, and Sydney were granted licences to join the AFL Women's from 2022 season 7. Bec Goddard who was in charge of the club's VFL Women's side was appointed as Hawthorns inaugural AFLW coach immediately following the announcement.

== Sponsorship ==
| Year | Kit Manufacturer | Major Sponsor | Shorts Sponsor | Bottom Back Sponsor | Top Back Sponsor | Neckline Sponsor |
|---|---|---|---|---|---|---|
| 2022–2024 | Cotton On | Nature Valley | KFC | Nissan | KFC | — |
| 2025 | Cotton On | Nature Valley | KFC | Nissan | KFC | Telstra |
| 2026– | Jaggad | Nature Valley | KFC | Nissan | KFC | Telstra |

== Players ==
=== Current AFLW squad ===
Hawthorn Football Club · AFL Women's personnel
| Playing list | | Inactive list | Coaching staff |
|---|---|---|---|
| 1 Emily Bates (c); 2 Eliza West (vc); 3 Greta Bodey; 4 Najwa Allen; 5 Jasmine Fleming; 6 Hayley McLaughlin; 7 Niamh Martin; 8 Lavinia Cox; 9 Keely Coyne; 10 Kaitlyn Ashmore; 11 Jenna Richardson; 12 Casey Sherriff; 13 Áine McDonagh; 14 Daisy Flockart; 15 Grace Baba | 16 Mikaylah Antony; 17 Mackenzie Eardley; 18 Hannah Looney; 19 Bridie Hipwell; 20 Laura Elliot; 21 Elli Symonds; 22 Laura Stone; 23 Jess Vukic; 24 Tamara Smith; 27 Mikayla Williamson; 28 Poppy Stockwell; 31 Lucy Wales; 32 Annabelle Embelton; 35 Maya Dear; 38 Jacqui Dupuy | 25 Emily Everist; 30 Matilda Van Berkel | Senior coach: Daniel Webster; Assistant coaches: Steph Binder (back line); Cameron Howat (midfield); Ben Cavarra (forward line); Cam McKinlay (assistant midfield); Jake Ireland (development); Phoebe McWilliams (development); Legend: (c) captain; (vc) vice-captain; Updated: 19 October 2026; Sources: Players, coaches |

== Staff ==
=== Coaching staff ===
| Coach | Assistant coaches | Development coaches |
|---|---|---|
| Daniel Webster | Steph Binder (backline); Cameron Howat (midfield); Ben Cavarra (forwards); Cam McKinlay (assistant midfield) | Mark Williams (head of development); Jake Ireland; Phoebe McWilliams |

== Club honour board ==
=== Achievements ===
**Premierships**
| Competition | Level | Wins | Years won |
| **VFL Women's** | Seniors | 1 | 2018 |

=== Finishing positions (after finals) ===
Note: bold indicates finals appearance

| Finishing Position | Year | Tally |
|---|---|---|
| Premiers | — | 0 |
| Grand Finalist | — | 0 |
| 3 | — | 0 |
| 4 | — | 0 |
| 5 | **2024**, **2025** | 2 |
| 6 | — | 0 |
| 7 | — | 0 |
| 8 | — | 0 |
| 9 | — | 0 |
| 10 | — | 0 |
| 11 | — | 0 |
| 12 | — | 0 |
| 13 | — | 0 |
| 14 | 2023 | 1 |
| 15 | 2022 (S7) | 1 |
| 16 | — | 0 |
| 17 | — | 0 |
| 18 | — | 0 |

=== Best and fairest ===
| Season | Winner | Ref. |
|---|---|---|
| 2022 (S7) | Tilly Lucas-Rodd | |
| 2023 | **Emily Bates** | |
| 2024 | **Eliza West** | |
| 2025 | **Áine McDonagh** | |

== Players' individual honours and awards ==
All–Australian team
Awarded since 2017

- Aileen Gilroy – 2024
- Tilly Lucas-Rodd – 2024
- Áine McDonagh – 2025

22under22 team
Awarded since 2017

- Jasmine Fleming – 2022 (S7), 2024, 2025

International rules representative

- Niamh Martin – 2026
- Áine McDonagh – 2026

== Coaches ==
Correct as of the end of 2025

| Category | Total | Name | Years |
|---|---|---|---|
| Most games | 27 | **Daniel Webster** | 2024– |
| Most games won | 19 | **Daniel Webster** | 2024– |
| Most home and away games | 23 | **Daniel Webster** | 2024– |
| Most home and away games won | 19 | **Daniel Webster** | 2024– |
| Most finals | 4 | **Daniel Webster** | 2024– |

== Records ==
Current Hawthorn players are shown in bold.

=== Games played ===
Correct as of the end of the 2025 season

| No. | Name | Years | Total |
|---|---|---|---|
| 1 | Tilly Lucas-Rodd | 2022–2025 | 47 |
| 2 | **Tamara Smith** | 2022– | 45 |
| 3 | **Áine McDonagh** | 2022– | 44 |
| 4 | **Jasmine Fleming** | 2022– | 43 |
| 5 | **Kaitlyn Ashmore** | 2022– | 42 |
| 5 | Aileen Gilroy | 2022–2025 | 42 |
| 7 | **Lucy Wales** | 2022– | 41 |
| 8 | **Jenna Richardson** | 2022– | 40 |
| 9 | **Laura Elliott** | 2022– | 39 |
| 10 | **Mackenzie Eardley** | 2022– | 38 |

=== Goals kicked ===
Correct as of the end of the 2025 season

| No. | Name | Years | Total |
|---|---|---|---|
| 1 | **Áine McDonagh** | 2022– | 52 |
| 2 | **Greta Bodey** | 2023– | 32 |
| 3 | Aileen Gilroy | 2022–2025 | 23 |
| 4 | **Bridie Hipwell** | 2022– | 15 |
| 5 | Tahlia Fellows | 2022–2024 | 10 |
| 6 | **Kaitlyn Ashmore** | 2022– | 9 |
| 7 | **Emily Bates** | 2023– | 7 |
| 7 | Jess Duffin | 2022 | 7 |
| 7 | **Jasmine Fleming** | 2022– | 7 |
| 7 | **Laura Stone** | 2024– | 7 |
| 7 | Kristy Stratton | 2023–2025 | 7 |

==== Season records ====
| **Statistic** | **Total** | **Name** | **Year** |
| Disposals | 316 | Eliza West | 2025 |
| Kicks | 215 | Tilly Lucas-Rodd | 2025 |
| Handballs | 212 | Eliza West | 2025 |
| Marks | 70 | Jenna Richardson | 2024 |
| Goals | 22 | Áine McDonagh | 2025 |
| Behinds | 22 | Áine McDonagh | 2025 |
| Hitouts | 336 | Lucy Wales | 2024 |
| Tackles | 102 | Eliza West | 2024 |
| Rebounds | 65 | Tilly Lucas-Rodd | 2025 |
| Inside 50s | 62 | Aileen Gilroy | 2024 |
| Clearances | 73 | Eliza West | 2024 |
| Contested possessions | 194 | Eliza West | 2025 |
| Uncontested possessions | 166 | Tilly Lucas-Rodd | 2025 |
| Contested marks | 12 | Jess Duffin | 2022 S7 |
| Marks inside 50 | 25 | Áine McDonagh | 2024 |
| One percenters | 51 | Emily Everist | 2025 |
| Goal assists | 10 | Áine McDonagh | 2024 |

==== Game records ====
| **Statistic** | **Total** | **Name** | **Game** |
| Disposals | 34 | Emily Bates | vs. Greater Western Sydney, Round 8, 2024 at Frankston Park |
| Kicks | 20 | Tilly Lucas-Rodd | vs. Geelong, Round 7, 2025 at Kardinia Park |
| Kicks | 20 | Jasmine Fleming | vs. North Melbourne, Round 6, 2026 at Cazalys Stadium |
| Handballs | 23 | Eliza West | vs. Carlton, Round 1, 2024 at Frankston Park |
| Marks | 13 | Jenna Richardson | vs. Geelong, Round 7, 2025 at Kardinia Park |
| Goals | 6 | Greta Bodey | vs. St Kilda, Round 4, 2024 at Moorabbin Oval |
| Behinds | 4 | Greta Bodey | vs. Carlton, Round 1, 2024 at Frankston Park |
| Behinds | 4 | Áine McDonagh | vs. Gold Coast, Round 9, 2025 at Frankston Park |
| Hitouts | 43 | Lucy Wales | vs. Fremantle, Round 6, 2024 at Fremantle Oval |
| Tackles | 16 | Eliza West | vs. Geelong, Round 5, 2024 at Kardinia Park |
| Rebounds | 11 | Catherine Brown | vs. Greater Western Sydney, Round 8, 2022 (S7) at Henson Park |
| Inside 50s | 9 | Aileen Gilroy | vs. Brisbane, Qualifying final, 2024 at Princes Park |
| Inside 50s | 9 | Aileen Gilroy | vs. Port Adelaide, Semi-final, 2024 at Princes Park |
| Clearances | 11 | Mattea Breed | vs. Greater Western Sydney, Round 8, 2024 at Frankston Park |
| Contested possessions | 25 | Eliza West | vs. Carlton, Round 1, 2024 at Frankston Park |
| Uncontested possessions | 21 | Emily Bates | vs. Greater Western Sydney, Round 8, 2024 at Frankston Park |
| Contested marks | 5 | Jacqui Dupuy | vs. Western Bulldogs, Round 5, 2026 at Kennedy Community Centre |
| Marks inside 50 | 6 | Jacqui Dupuy | vs. Melbourne, Round 1, 2026 at Princes Park |
| One percenters | 9 | Emily Everist | vs. North Melbourne, Qualifying final, 2025 at Princes Park |
| One percenters | 9 | Najwa Allen | vs. Carlton, Semi-final, 2025 at Princes Park |
| One percenters | 9 | Lucy Wales | vs. Port Adelaide, Round 2, 2026 at Alberton Oval |
| Goal assists | 2 | Ainslie Kemp | vs. West Coast, Round 6, 2022 (S7) at Frankston Park |
| Goal assists | 2 | Tahlia Fellows | vs. Fremantle, Round 10, 2022 (S7) at Fremantle Oval |
| Goal assists | 2 | Áine McDonagh | vs. Fremantle, Round 10, 2022 (S7) at Fremantle Oval |
| Goal assists | 2 | Áine McDonagh | vs. Richmond, Round 8, 2023 at Cazalys Stadium |
| Goal assists | 2 | Áine McDonagh | vs. St Kilda, Round 4, 2024 at Moorabbin Oval |
| Goal assists | 2 | Áine McDonagh | vs. Geelong, Round 5, 2024 at Kardinia Park |
| Goal assists | 2 | Áine McDonagh | vs. Essendon, Round 11, 2025 at Windy Hill |
| Goal assists | 2 | Tilly Lucas-Rodd | vs. Port Adelaide, Round 9, 2023 at Frankston Park |
| Goal assists | 2 | Jasmine Fleming | vs. Collingwood, Round 2, 2024 at Victoria Park |
| Goal assists | 2 | Jasmine Fleming | vs. St Kilda, Round 4, 2024 at Moorabbin Oval |
| Goal assists | 2 | Jasmine Fleming | vs. Western Bulldogs, Round 5, 2026 at Kennedy Community Centre |
| Goal assists | 2 | Lucy Wales | vs. Collingwood, Round 2, 2024 at Victoria Park |
| Goal assists | 2 | Aileen Gilroy | vs. Geelong, Round 5, 2024 at Kardinia Park |
| Goal assists | 2 | Louise Stephenson | vs. Geelong, Round 5, 2024 at Kardinia Park |
| Goal assists | 2 | Sophie Butterworth | vs. Greater Western Sydney, Round 8, 2024 at Frankston Park |
| Goal assists | 2 | Sophie Butterworth | vs. St Kilda, Round 4, 2025 at Cazalys Stadium |
| Goal assists | 2 | Greta Bodey | vs. Geelong, Round 7, 2025 at Kardinia Park |
| Goal assists | 2 | Daisy Flockart | vs. Gold Coast, Round 9, 2025 at Frankston Park |
| Goal assists | 2 | Eliza West | vs. Essendon, Round 11, 2025 at Windy Hill |
| Goal assists | 2 | Jacqui Dupuy | vs. Port Adelaide, Round 2, 2026 at Alberton Oval |
| Goal assists | 2 | Laura Stone | vs. Geelong, Round 7, 2026 at Kardinia Park |

==== Team records ====
| **Record** | **Total** | **Game** |
| Highest score | 12.7 (79) | vs. Geelong, Round 5, 2024 at Kardinia Park |
| Lowest score | 0.3 (3) | vs. North Melbourne, Qualifying final, 2025 at Princes Park |
| Highest score conceded | 15.4 (94) | vs. Port Adelaide, Round 10, 2025 at Alberton Oval |
| Lowest score conceded | 1.2 (8) | vs. West Coast, Round 7, 2024 at Frankston Park |
| Biggest win | 66 points | vs. West Coast, Round 7, 2024 at Frankston Park |
| Biggest loss | 59 points | vs. Melbourne, Round 4, 2023 at Frankston Park |
| Consecutive wins | 8 | Round 4, 2024 – Round 10, 2024 |
| Consecutive losses | 4 | Round 1, 2022 (S7) – Round 4, 2022 (S7) |
| Consecutive losses | 4 | Round 8, 2022 (S7) – Round 1, 2023 |
| Consecutive losses | 4 | Round 3, 2023 – Round 6, 2023 |
| Consecutive losses | 4 | Round 12, 2025 – Round 1, 2026 |
| Consecutive finals lost | 4 | Qualifying final, 2024 – Semi-final, 2025 (ongoing) |
| Highest attendance | 12,092 | vs. Essendon, Round 1, 2022 (S7) at Docklands Stadium |
| Highest home-and-away attendance | 12,092 | vs. Essendon, Round 1, 2022 (S7) at Docklands Stadium |

== Seasons ==
Note: Correct as of the end of the 2025 season.

| **Premiers** | Runners–up | **Minor premiers** | Finals appearance | Wooden spoon | AFLW leading goalkicker | AFLW best and fairest |

| Year | League | W | L | D | Finish | Finals | Coach | Captain | Leading goalkicker | Best and fairest | Ref |
|---|---|---|---|---|---|---|---|---|---|---|---|
| **2018** | **VFLW** | 12 | 2 | 0 | **1st** | Won Semi-final (Collingwood) 32–21; Won Grand Final (Geelong) 30–19 | Patrick Hill | Emma Mackie | Sarah Perkins | Jayde Van Dyk | |
| 2019 | VFLW | 7 | 6 | 1 | 7th | | Bec Goddard | Tamara Luke | Phoebe McWilliams | Rosie Dillon | |
| 2020 | VFLW | (No season) | | | | | Bec Goddard | Tamara Luke | (No season) | | |
| 2021 | VFLW | 5 | 9 | 0 | 9th | | Bec Goddard | Meg Hutchins | Jessie Williams | Tamara Luke | |
| 2022 | VFLW | 12 | 1 | 1 | 2nd | Lost Qualifying final (Essendon) 7–60; Lost Semi-final (Southern Saints) 39–55 | Bec Goddard | Tamara Luke | Kristy Stratton; Jessie Williams | Jordan Mifsud | |
| 2022 (S7) | AFLW | 3 | 7 | 0 | 15th | | Bec Goddard | Tilly Lucas-Rodd | Jess Duffin | Tilly Lucas-Rodd | |
| 2023 | AFLW | 3 | 7 | 0 | 14th | | Bec Goddard | Tilly Lucas-Rodd | Áine McDonagh | Emily Bates | |
| 2024 | AFLW | 10 | 1 | 0 | 2nd | Lost Qualifying final (Brisbane) 32–38; Lost Semi-final (Port Adelaide) 49–50 | Daniel Webster | Emily Bates | Áine McDonagh | Eliza West | |
| 2025 | AFLW | 9 | 3 | 0 | 4th | Lost Qualifying final (North Melbourne) 3–42; Lost Semi-final (Carlton) 33–79 | Daniel Webster | Emily Bates | Áine McDonagh | Áine McDonagh | |
