= List of AFL Women's minor premiers =

This page is a complete chronological listing of AFL Women's minor premiers. The AFL Women's (AFLW) is the elite national competition in women's Australian rules football.

The team that finishes the home-and-away season on top of the premiership ladder is known as the "minor premier". In the inaugural two AFL Women's seasons, the minor premier hosted the AFL Women's Grand Final, as there was no finals series. This was unlike the Australian Football League (AFL), where the AFL Grand Final is the culmination of a finals series, and finishing on top of the ladder provides only minor benefits. No award has yet been given to the AFL Women's minor premier, and the main league award is the AFL Women's premiership, which is awarded to the winner of the AFL Women's Grand Final.

There were no officially recognised minor premiers in 2019 and 2020 due to the use of a conference system in those seasons. The league reverted to a single ladder in 2021, thus making the recognition of minor premiers an obvious process.

== List of minor premiers ==
The following is a list of minor premiers, ladder details and results.

No official minor premier due to the use of a conference system

Season	Minor premier	Points	Percentage	Second place	Margin	Final result	Premiers
2017	Brisbane	26	151.4	Adelaide	6 points	Runners-up	Adelaide
2018	Western Bulldogs	20	142.5	Brisbane	4 points	Premiers	
2019							Adelaide
2020							— (Note: No premiership was awarded after the season was curtailed and eventually cancelled due to the COVID-19 pandemic.)
2021	Adelaide	28	208.4	Brisbane	13.4%	Runners-up	Brisbane
2022 (S6)	Adelaide (2)	36	216.6	Melbourne	30.1%	Premiers	
2022 (S7)	Brisbane (2)	36	282.4	Melbourne	0.3%	Runners-up	Melbourne
2023	Adelaide (3)	36	190.8	Melbourne	4 points	Third	Brisbane
2024	North Melbourne	42	315.4	Hawthorn	2 points	Premiers	
2025	North Melbourne (2)	48	321.5	Melbourne	12 points	Premiers	
2026	North Melbourne (3)	44	246.6	Geelong	66.6%		

== Minor premiership wins ==
Club	Seasons in competition	Minor premierships	Minor premiers and premiers in same season		Most recent minor premiership
Club	Seasons in competition	Minor premierships	Total	Seasons	Most recent minor premiership
Adelaide	2017–present	3	1	S6	2023
North Melbourne	2019–present	3	2	2024, 2025	2026
Brisbane	2017–present	2	0	—	2022 (S7)
Western Bulldogs	2017–present	1	1	2018	2018
Carlton	2017–present	0	—	—	—
Collingwood	2017–present	0	—	—	—
Fremantle	2017–present	0	—	—	—
Greater Western Sydney	2017–present	0	—	—	—
Melbourne	2017–present	0	—	—	—
Geelong	2019–present	0	—	—	—
Gold Coast	2020–present	0	—	—	—
Richmond	2020–present	0	—	—	—
St Kilda	2020–present	0	—	—	—
West Coast	2020–present	0	—	—	—
Essendon	2022 (S7)–present	0	—	—	—
Hawthorn	2022 (S7)–present	0	—	—	—
Port Adelaide	2022 (S7)–present	0	—	—	—
Sydney	2022 (S7)–present	0	—	—	—

== See also ==
- List of AFL Women's premiers
- List of VFL/AFL minor premiers
- McClelland Trophy
