= Cameron Howat =

Australian rules footballer

Personal information
- Born: 30 January 1985 (age 41)
- Original team: Old Carey/Oakleigh Under 18s/Box Hill
- Debut: Round 18, 5 August 2006, Richmond vs. Western Bulldogs, at Melbourne Cricket Ground
- Height: 182 cm (6 ft 0 in)
- Weight: 77 kg (170 lb)

Playing career^{1}
Years	Club	Games (Goals)
2006–2008	Richmond	21 (10)
- ^{1} Playing statistics correct to the end of 2008.

Cameron Howat (born 30 January 1985) is a former Australian rules footballer who was selected in the 2005 AFL Rookie Draft by the Richmond Football Club and delisted after the 2008 season.

After playing 20 senior games in two seasons Howat was de-listed by the Tigers on 31 October 2007. However he was reselected that same year at the 2007 AFL Rookie Draft at pick 47. He did show some promise when in the senior team, his silky skills and dashing run from defence being a treat to watch.

He played one more game in 2008 in which he was suspended for striking. He was finally delisted from the Richmond Rookie list at the end of the 2008 season.
