= Bec Goddard =

Australian rules football coach

Bec Goddard OAM
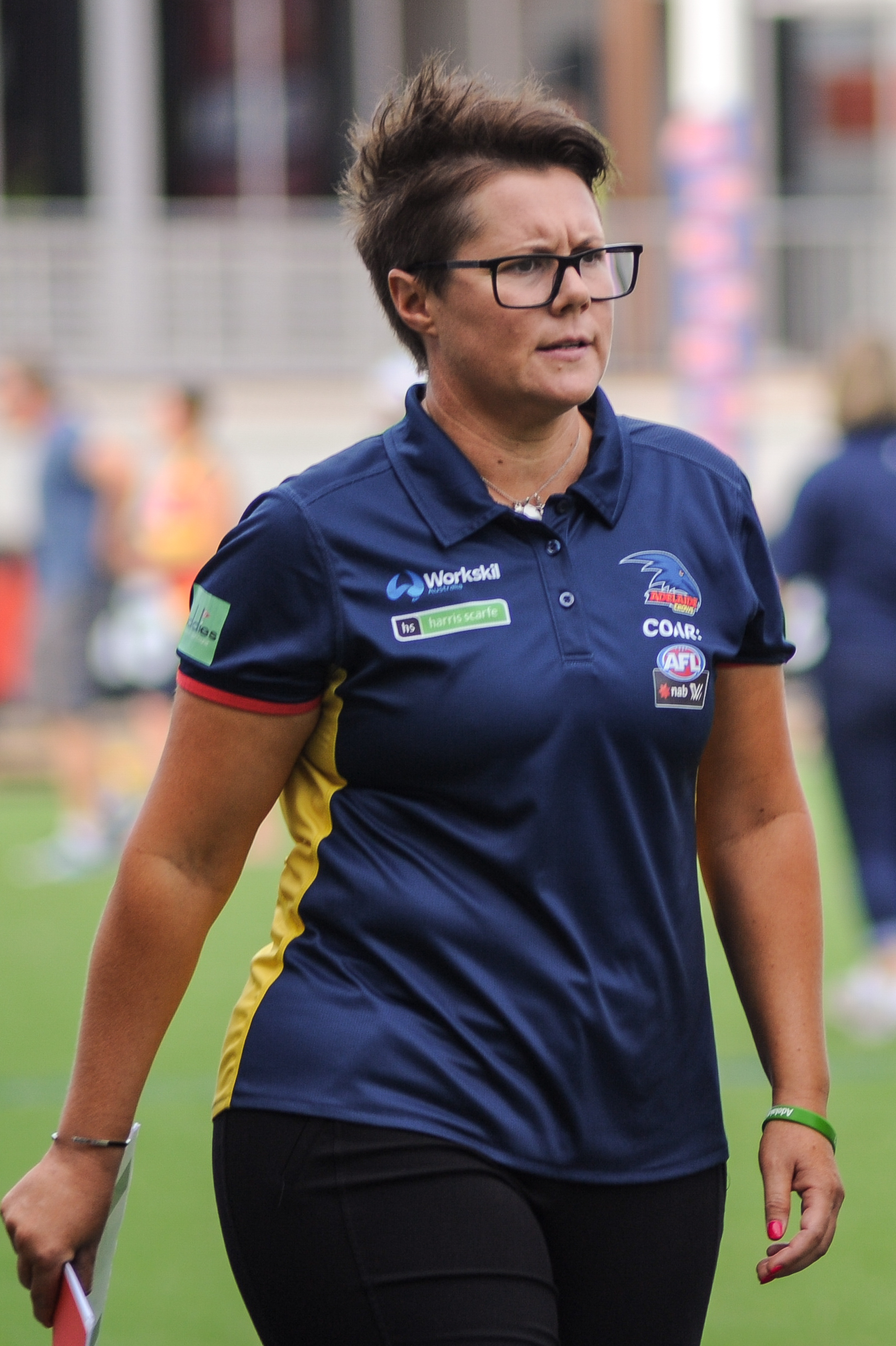
- Goddard in March 2017

Personal information
- Full name: Rebecca Goddard
- Born: June 1978 (age 48)

Coaching career^{3}
Years	Club	Games (W–L–D)
2017–2018	Adelaide (W)	15 (9–5–1)
2022 (S7)–2023	Hawthorn (W)	20 (6–14–0)
2017	Representative; The Allies (W)	1 (0–1–0)
Total		36 (15–20–1)
- ^{3} Coaching statistics correct as of 2023.

Career highlights
- AFLW premiership coach: 2017; All-Australian team: 2017

Rebecca Goddard OAM (born 1978) is a former Australian rules football coach who most recently served as the head coach of the Hawthorn Football Club in the AFL Women's competition (AFLW). Goddard also previously coached Adelaide Football Club in the AFL Women's competition (AFLW) between 2017 and 2018, winning the 2017 AFL Women's Grand Final. She was assistant coach of the University of Canberra Capitals in the Women's National Basketball League (WNBL) in 2018/19, when it won the league championship.

== Playing career ==
Goddard played Australian rules football as a junior until the age of 13 before the absence of a girls competition forced her to stop. When Canberra got its first women's competition some seven years later, Goddard again returned to playing. She played for Belconnen at that level before a broken leg at age 29 forced her to swap her playing career for one in umpiring and coaching.

== Umpiring career ==
Goddard holds the honour to be the first female field umpire in the North East Australian Football League (NEAFL).

== Coaching career ==
Goddard began coaching at the Gungahlin Jets in the AFL Canberra league. She served as assistant coach at the Queanbeyan Football Club as well as becoming the first female coach in the NEAFL. In 2016 she worked as the Under 18 boys forwards coach for Woodville West Torrens.

In 2016 Goddard was appointed the inaugural coach of the Adelaide Football Club's AFL Women's team. She was just one of two woman head coaches in the eight team league. She coached the club to the premiership success in its inaugural season the following year. In July 2017 she was named the coach of the Allies team in the AFLW State of Origin match to be played in September of that year.

In 2018 she coached Adelaide the a fifth-place finish, with three wins for the season. She resigned at season's end, electing to return to Canberra to resume full-time work with the Australian Federal Police. In Canberra, she became an assistant coach of the University of Canberra Capitals basketball team. The Capitals went on to win the Women's National Basketball League (WNBL) championship in 2019. Goddard attracted the interest of the Gold Coast Suns, who entered the AFLW competition in 2020, when it expanded 14 teams. In 2021 she coached Hawthorn in the VFL Women's (VFLW) competition.

In August 2021, following an announcement that Hawthorn would enter the AFL Women's competition in 2022, Goddard was announced as the club's inaugural coach.

Following the conclusion of the 2023 AFL Women's season, in which Hawthorn finished in 14th position, Goddard resigned as coach.

== Coaching statistics ==
Updated to the end of 2023

Legend
W	Wins	L	Losses	D	Draws	W%	Winning percentage	LP	Ladder position	LT	League teams

Season	Team	Games	W	L	D	W %	LP	LT
2017^{#}	Adelaide	8	6	2	0	75.0%	2	8
2018	Adelaide	7	3	3	1	42.9%	5	8
2022 (S7)	Hawthorn	10	3	7	0	30.0%	15	18
2023	Hawthorn	10	3	7	0	30.0%	14	18
Career totals		35	15	19	1	42.9%		

== Honours and achievements ==
Team

- AFLW premiership coach (Adelaide): 2017

Individual

- All-Australian team: 2017
- Hawthorn games coached record holder
- Hawthorn wins coached record holder
- Hawthorn home and away games coached record holder
- Hawthorn home and away wins coached record holder
- Medal of the Order of Australia: 2021

== Personal life ==
Outside of football, Goddard previously worked for the Australian Federal Police where she attained the rank of Superintendent, at the time of her retirement she was attached to ACT Policing in charge on Police Communications. She retired from the Australian Federal Police in 2022 to pursue her football career full time. She moved from Canberra to Adelaide in 2015 where she began pursuing a high level coaching career in football in addition to her work with the AFP.

She holds a degree in Journalism and once worked as a media advisory in the Labor government of the 1990s. Goddard also holds a degree in Persian language from the Australian National University.

Goddard is dating writer and actress Shanrah Wakefield.
