= Greta Bodey =

Australian rules footballer

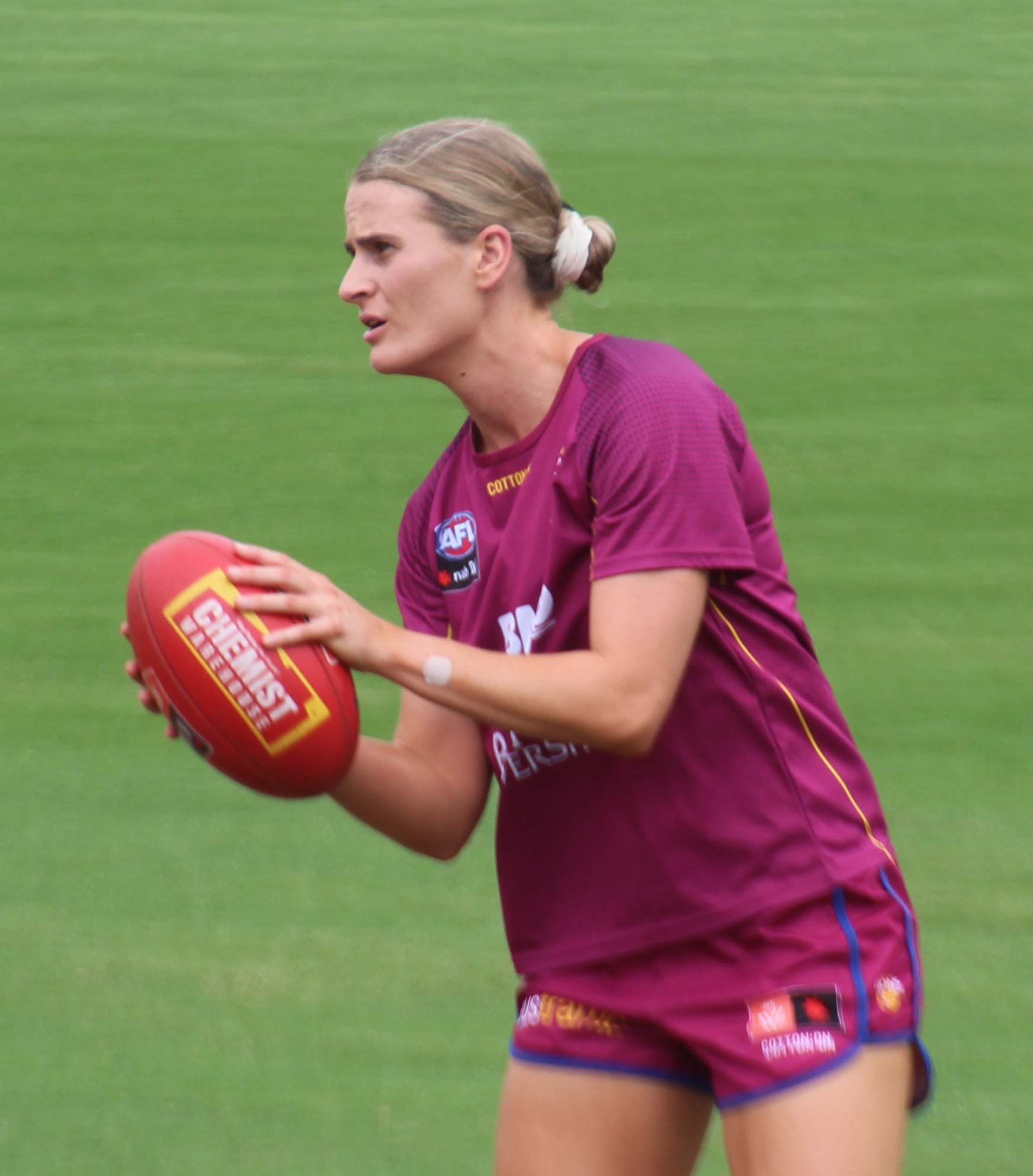
- Bodey warming up before the 2022 season 7 Grand Final

Personal information
- Born: 11 July 1995 (age 31)
- Original team: University of Queensland (QWAFL)
- Draft: 2019 rookie signing
- Debut: Round 1, 2020, Brisbane vs. Adelaide, at Hickey Park
- Height: 171 cm (5 ft 7 in)
- Position: Forward

Club information
- Current club: Hawthorn
- Number: 3

Playing career^{1}
Years	Club	Games (Goals)
2020–2022 (S7)	Brisbane	42 (35)
2023–	Hawthorn	35 (32)
Total		77 (67)
- ^{1} Playing statistics correct to the end of 2025.

Career highlights
- AFLW premiership player: 2021; AFL Women's All-Australian team: S7; Brisbane leading goalkicker: S6

Greta Bodey (born 11 July 1995) is an Australian rules footballer playing for Hawthorn in the AFL Women's competition (AFLW).

Bodey was raised in Brisbane. She came to the sport much later than average after playing association football for much of her life for clubs including The Gap FC and aspired to play for the Matildas. First taking part in Australian rules in 2019, she played for Saints in Cairns while on placement as a physiotherapist and University of Queensland in the AFL Queensland Women's League before being selected by Brisbane as an other-sport rookie ahead of the 2020 AFLW season.

Bodey made her AFLW debut in Brisbane's round 1 game against Adelaide at Hickey Park on 8 February 2020. Playing in her second season for Hawthorn in 2024, Bodey kicked a career-high 6 goals in the Round 4 demolition of St. Kilda.

== Statistics ==
Updated to the end of 2025.

Legend
G	Goals	K	Kicks	D	Disposals	T	Tackles
B	Behinds	H	Handballs	M	Marks
#	Played in that season's premiership team

Season	Team	No.	Games	Totals							Averages (per game)							Votes
Season	Team	No.	Games	G	B	K	H	D	M	T	G	B	K	H	D	M	T	Votes
2020	Brisbane	15	6	2	1	24	17	41	6	18	0.3	0.2	4.0	2.8	6.8	1.0	3.0	0
2021^{#}	Brisbane	15	11	9	6	71	62	133	16	38	0.8	0.5	6.5	5.6	12.1	1.5	3.5	0
2022 (S6)	Brisbane	15	12	13	11	83	55	138	31	40	1.1	0.9	6.9	4.6	11.5	2.6	3.3	2
2022 (S7)	Brisbane	15	13	11	13	89	43	132	29	34	0.8	1.0	6.8	3.3	10.2	2.2	2.6	0
2023	Hawthorn	3	10	9	4	59	24	83	17	46	0.9	0.4	5.9	2.4	8.3	1.7	4.6	3
2024	Hawthorn	3	11	12	10	100	50	150	25	36	1.1	0.9	9.1	4.5	14.6	2.3	3.3	4
2025	Hawthorn	3	14	11	14	78	60	138	23	51	0.8	1.0	5.6	4.3	9.9	1.6	3.6	0
Career			77	67	59	504	311	815	147	263	0.9	0.8	6.5	4.0	10.6	1.9	3.4	9

== Honours and achievements ==
Team

- AFL Women's premiership player (Brisbane): 2021
- AFL Women's minor premiership (Brisbane): S7
- McClelland Trophy (Hawthorn): 2024

Individual

- AFL Women's All-Australian team: S7
- Brisbane leading goalkicker: S6
