= Eliza West =

Australian rules footballer

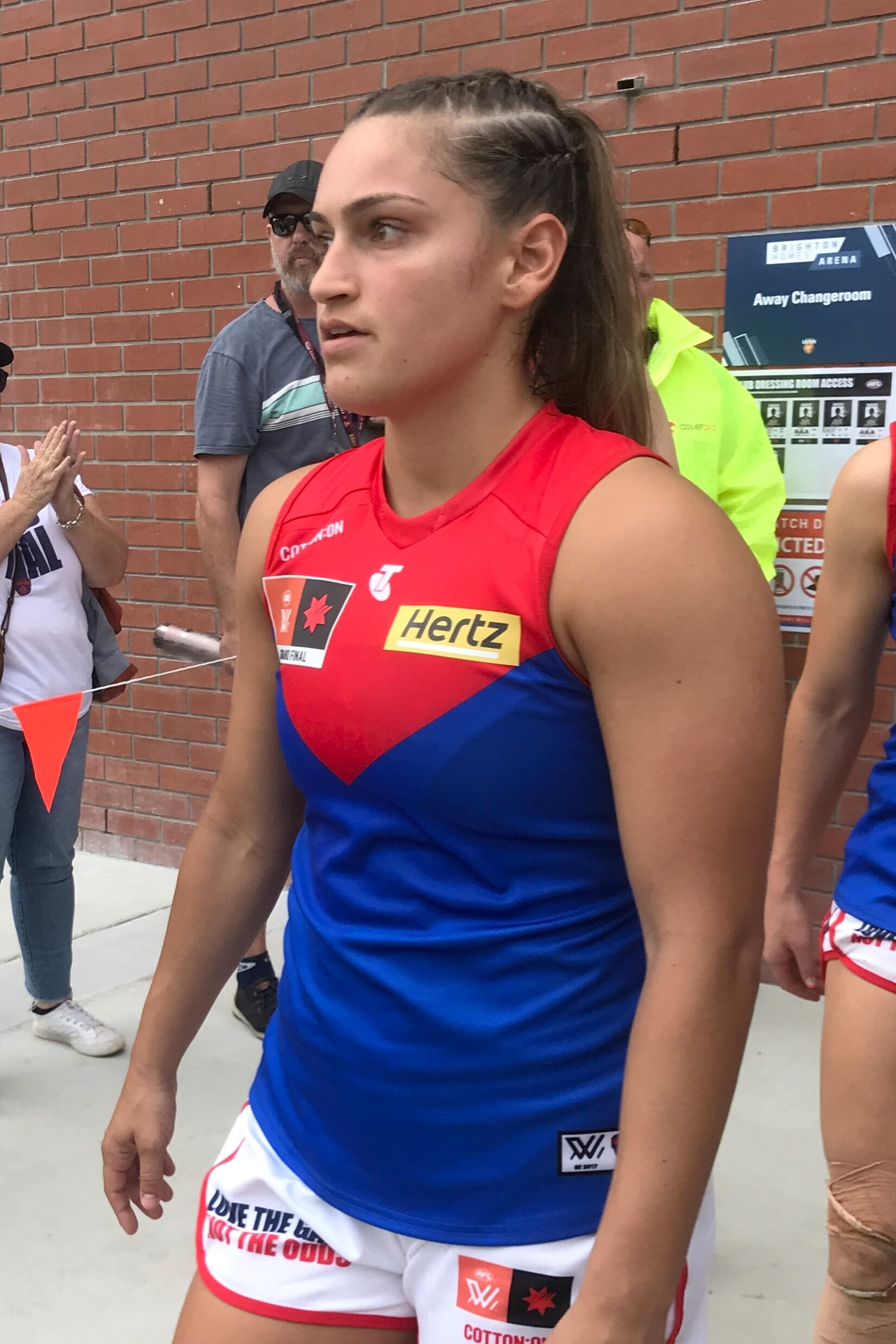
- West with Melbourne in 2022

Personal information
- Full name: Eliza West
- Born: 26 May 1997 (age 29)
- Original team: Casey (VFLW)
- Draft: 2021 rookie signing
- Debut: Round 1, 2022 (S6), Melbourne vs. Western Bulldogs, at Whitten Oval
- Height: 162 cm (5 ft 4 in)
- Position: Midfielder

Club information
- Current club: Hawthorn
- Number: 2

Playing career^{1}
Years	Club	Games (Goals)
2022 (S6)–2023	Melbourne	36 (3)
2024–	Hawthorn	27 (5)
Total		63 (8)
- ^{1} Playing statistics correct to the end of the 2025 season.

Career highlights
- AFL Women's premiership player: S7; Hawthorn best and fairest: 2024

Eliza West (born 26 May 1997) is an Australian rules footballer playing for the Hawthorn Football Club in the AFL Women's (AFLW). She previously played for the Melbourne Football Club from season 6 to 2023. West won an AFL Women's premiership with Melbourne in season 7 and the Hawthorn best and fairest award in 2024.

== Early life ==
West attended The Peninsula School before earning a basketball scholarship at Utah State. She played basketball with the Utah State Aggies from 2017 to 2019, winning the Mountain West Freshman of the Year in 2017.

West then switched to Australian rules football, initially playing for Casey in the VFL. She won Casey's Best and Fairest as well as the Debbie Lee Medal in 2021.

== AFL Women's career ==
=== Melbourne (2022–2023) ===
West played for Melbourne in the AFL in 2022 and 2023; she was Melbourne's best player in its winning 2022 AFL Women's season 7 Grand Final, finishing one vote behind Shannon Campbell for best on ground.

=== Hawthorn (2024–present) ===
Following the 2023 season, West was traded to Hawthorn. She won the Hawthorn best and fairest award in her first season at the club in 2024.

== Statistics ==
Updated to the end of the 2025 season.

Legend
G	Goals	K	Kicks	D	Disposals	T	Tackles
B	Behinds	H	Handballs	M	Marks
#	Played in that season's premiership team

Season	Team	No.	Games	Totals							Averages (per game)							Votes
Season	Team	No.	Games	G	B	K	H	D	M	T	G	B	K	H	D	M	T	Votes
2022 (S6)	Melbourne	11	12	1	4	49	104	153	16	51	0.1	0.3	4.1	8.7	12.8	1.3	4.3	2
2022 (S7)^{#}	Melbourne	11	13	1	4	74	153	227	19	72	0.1	0.3	5.7	11.8	17.5	1.5	5.5	6
2023	Melbourne	11	11	1	2	76	113	189	17	70	0.1	0.2	6.9	10.3	17.2	1.5	6.4	2
2024	Hawthorn	2	13	4	1	106	179	285	16	102	0.3	0.1	8.2	13.8	21.9	1.2	7.8	12
2025	Hawthorn	2	14	1	0	104	212	316	18	78	0.1	0.0	7.4	15.1	22.6	1.3	5.6	9
Career			63	8	11	409	761	1170	86	373	0.1	0.2	6.5	12.1	18.6	1.4	5.9	31

== Honours and achievements ==
Team

- AFL Women's premiership player (Melbourne): S7
- McClelland Trophy (Melbourne): 2023
- McClelland Trophy (Hawthorn): 2024

Individual

- Hawthorn best and fairest: 2024
