= Kristy Stratton =

Australian rules footballer (born 1995)

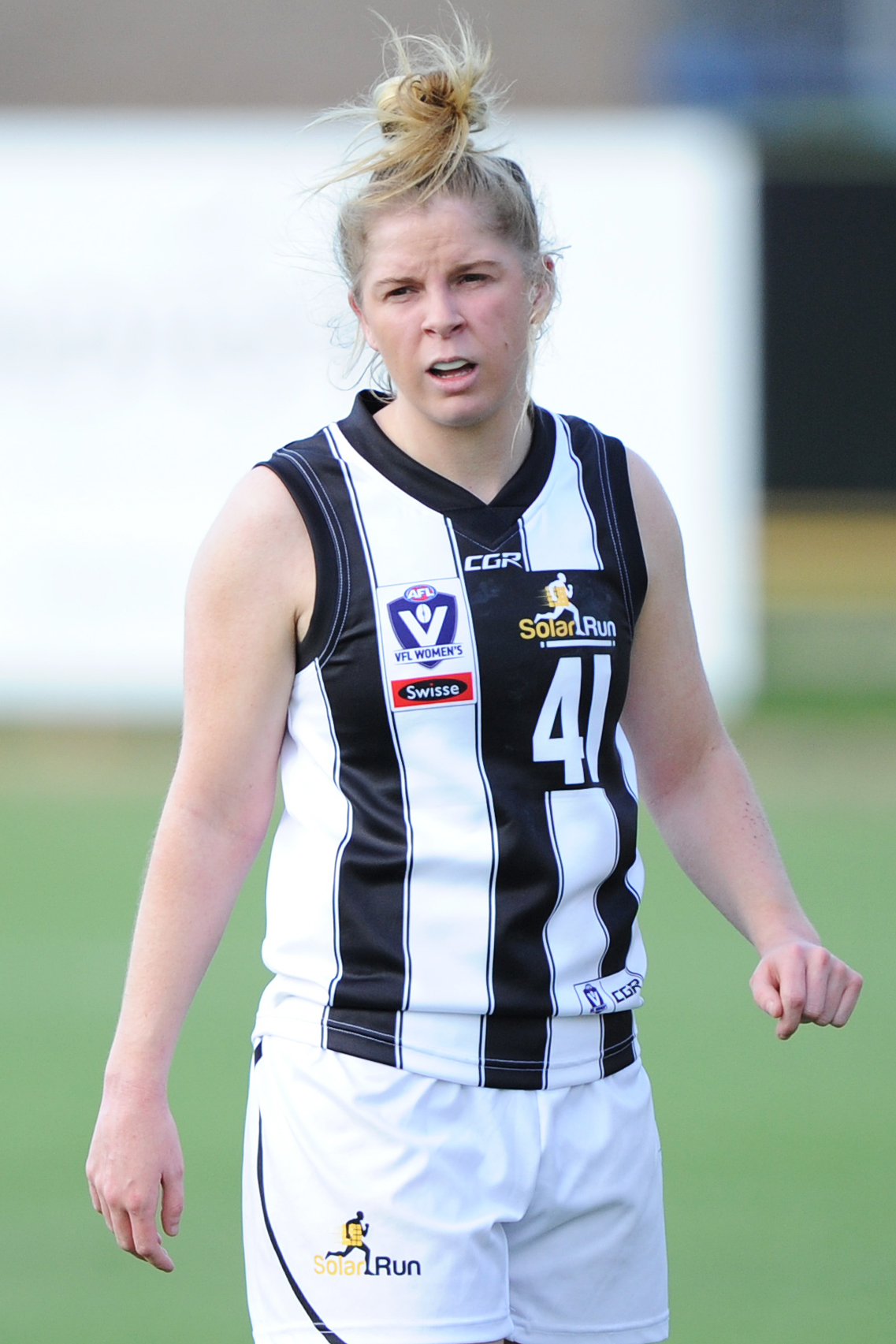
- Stratton playing for Collingwood's VFLW team in June 2018

Personal information
- Born: 26 January 1995 (age 31)
- Original team: Box Hill Hawks (VFLW)
- Draft: No. 21, 2017 AFL Women's draft
- Debut: Round 6, 2018, Collingwood vs. Brisbane, at Moreton Bay Central Sports Complex
- Height: 163 cm (5 ft 4 in)
- Position: Midfielder

Playing career^{1}
Years	Club	Games (Goals)
2018–2021	Collingwood	11 (1)
2023–2025	Hawthorn	17 (7)
Total		28 (8)
- ^{1} Playing statistics correct to the end of 2025.

Kristy Stratton (born 26 January 1995) is an Australian rules footballer who most recently played for the Hawthorn Football Club in the AFL Women's (AFLW).

== State football ==
In 2014, Stratton won the Victorian Women's Football League (VWFL) Division 1 best and fairest, while playing at Knox. After rupturing her anterior cruciate ligament, she underwent a knee construction in 2015. This surgery and advice from the surgeon prompted her to give up athletics and focus on football. Stratton played for Box Hill Hawks in the VFL Women's (VFLW). In 2017, she only managed to play seven games due to tearing her lateral meniscus.

== AFL Women's career ==
Stratton was drafted by Collingwood with the club's fifth selection and the 21st overall in the 2017 AFL Women's draft. Joining Collingwood, she teamed-up with Melissa Kuys who captained her when they played for Box Hill Hawks. She made her debut in a 14-point win over the Brisbane at Moreton Bay Central Sports Complex in round 6 of the 2018 season. Collingwood re-signed Stratton for the 2019 season during the trade period in June 2018. Midway through the season, she suffered another injury, this time breaking her hand. In April 2019, Stratton re-committed to Collingwood for the 2020 season, along with Jordyn Allen, Emma Grant, and Sharni Layton. In April 2021, Stratton was delisted by Collingwood. Following her delisting, she re-joined Box Hill Hawks. She was drafted to Hawthorn with pick 18 in the 2023 AFL Women's supplementary draft.

== Personal life ==
Stratton is the younger sister of champion athlete Brooke Stratton. Both of them attended Caulfield Grammar School in Wheelers Hill, Victoria and were active athletes, with Brooke holding many records and Kristy holding the record for 80 metres hurdles in the under-14 category. She grew up as a Collingwood supporter.

== Statistics ==
Updated to the end of round 10, 2025.

Legend
G	Goals	K	Kicks	D	Disposals	T	Tackles
B	Behinds	H	Handballs	M	Marks

Season	Team	No.	Games	Totals							Averages (per game)							Votes
Season	Team	No.	Games	G	B	K	H	D	M	T	G	B	K	H	D	M	T	Votes
2018	Collingwood	41	2	0	0	7	2	9	1	4	0.0	0.0	3.5	1.0	4.5	0.5	2.0	0
2019	Collingwood	41	5	0	2	31	17	48	2	29	0.0	0.4	6.2	3.4	9.6	0.4	5.8	0
2020	Collingwood	41	1	0	0	2	3	5	0	1	0.0	0.0	2.0	3.0	5.0	0.0	1.0	0
2021	Collingwood	41	3	1	0	12	5	17	2	5	0.3	0.0	4.0	1.7	5.7	0.7	2.0	0
2023	Hawthorn	41	10	5	5	55	48	103	20	70	0.5	0.5	5.5	4.8	10.3	2.0	7.0	0
2024	Hawthorn	41	3	1	0	7	10	17	3	7	0.3	0.0	2.3	3.3	5.7	1.0	2.3	0
2025	Hawthorn	41	4	1	4	20	10	30	11	7	0.3	1.0	5.0	2.5	7.5	2.8	1.8	0
Career			28	8	11	134	95	229	39	124	0.3	0.3	4.8	3.4	8.2	1.4	4.4	0

== Honours and achievements ==
Team

- McClelland Trophy (Hawthorn): 2024

== See also ==
- List of Caulfield Grammar School people
