= Jasmine Fleming =

Australian rules footballer

Personal information
- Full name: Jasmine Fleming
- Born: 5 November 2004 (age 21)
- Original team: Oakleigh Chargers (NAB League Girls)
- Draft: No. 2, 2022 national draft
- Debut: Round 1, S7, Hawthorn vs. Essendon, at Marvel Stadium
- Height: 165 cm (5 ft 5 in)
- Position: Midfielder

Club information
- Current club: Hawthorn
- Number: 5

Playing career^{1}
Years	Club	Games (Goals)
2022 (S7)–	Hawthorn	43 (7)
- ^{1} Playing statistics correct to the end of 2025.

Career highlights
- 3× AFL Women's 22under22 team: S7, 2024, 2025

Jasmine Fleming (born 5 November 2004) is an Australian rules footballer playing for the Hawthorn Football Club in the AFL Women's (AFLW). Fleming was recruited by Hawthorn with the second selection in the 2022 AFL Women's draft. She is the daughter of Australian cricketer Damien Fleming and ex-pro netball player Wendy O'Donnell.

== AFL Women's career ==
Fleming debuted for the Hawks in the opening round of 2022 AFL Women's season 7, playing in their inaugural team fielded against Essendon. On debut, she collected 12 disposals and 3 tackles. Fleming earned a rising star nomination in round 5, after a 16 disposal, 10 tackle game against Sydney, seeing her named as one of the team's best on ground.

== Statistics ==
Updated to the end of 2025.

Legend
G	Goals	K	Kicks	D	Disposals	T	Tackles
B	Behinds	H	Handballs	M	Marks

Season	Team	No.	Games	Totals							Averages (per game)							Votes
Season	Team	No.	Games	G	B	K	H	D	M	T	G	B	K	H	D	M	T	Votes
2022 (S7)	Hawthorn	5	9	0	2	86	44	130	11	39	0.0	0.2	9.6	4.9	14.4	1.2	4.3	0
2023	Hawthorn	5	10	0	0	92	68	160	12	41	0.0	0.0	9.2	6.8	16.0	1.2	4.1	0
2024	Hawthorn	5	13	5	4	157	85	242	30	58	0.4	0.3	12.1	6.5	18.6	2.3	4.5	6
2025	Hawthorn	5	11	2	3	100	83	183	17	57	0.2	0.3	9.1	7.5	16.6	1.5	5.2	8
Career			43	7	9	435	280	715	70	195	0.2	0.2	10.1	6.5	16.6	1.6	4.5	14

== Honours and achievements ==
Team

- McClelland Trophy (Hawthorn): 2024

Individual

- 3× AFL Women's 22under22 team: S7, 2024, 2025
- 2× AFL Women's Rising Star nominee: S7, 2023
