= Áine McDonagh =

Personal information
- Full name: Áine Siobhan McDonagh
- Born: 28 August 1998 (age 28); New York, United States of America
- Original team: Galway GAA (Ireland)
- Draft: Rookie signing, 2022
- Debut: 17 September 2022 vs. Western Bulldogs, at Box Hill City Oval
- Height: 182 cm (6 ft 0 in)
- Position: Key Forward

Club information
- Current club: Hawthorn
- Number: 13

Playing career^{1}
Years	Club	Games (Goals)
2022–	Hawthorn	44 (52)

International team honours^{2}
Years	Team	Games (Goals)
2026	Ireland	1 (0)
- ^{1} Playing statistics correct to the end of 2025.^{2} Representative statistics correct as of 2026.

Career highlights
- AFL Women's All-Australian team: 2025; Hawthorn best and fairest: 2025; 3× Hawthorn leading goalkicker: 2023, 2024, 2025

Áine Siobhan McDonagh is an Australian rules footballer who plays for Hawthorn in the AFL Women's (AFLW) and previously a leading Gaelic footballer and basketballer in Ireland.

Born in New York, United States of America and raised in Moycullen, County Galway, McDonagh comes from a prominent Irish sporting family; her uncle Mick Holden won an All-Ireland Gaelic football championship with Dublin in 1983, and her second cousins Brian Hogan and Joey Holden are leading hurlers.

McDonagh won the Irish Women's Super League basketball championships with NUIG Mystics and played her junior and senior Gaelic football for Galway GAA before being signed by AFLW club Hawthorn as a rookie in 2022 prior to Season 7. McDonagh made her debut AFLW debut in Round 4 2022 S7, against Western Bulldogs at Box Hill City Oval, losing by 30 points.

McDonagh topped Hawthorn's leading Goalkicking in 2023 with 10 goals and in 2024 with 16 goals, leading to her inclusion in the 2024 AFLW All-Australian squad.

In Round 11 2025, McDonagh kicked her 50th career AFLW goal in her 41st match, equalling Cora Staunton and Katie Brennan for the record of 50 goals in the fewest number of games.

== Statistics ==
Updated to the end of 2025

Legend
G	Goals	K	Kicks	D	Disposals	T	Tackles
B	Behinds	H	Handballs	M	Marks

Season	Team	No.	Games	Totals							Averages (per game)							Votes
Season	Team	No.	Games	G	B	K	H	D	M	T	G	B	K	H	D	M	T	Votes
2022 (S7)	Hawthorn	13	7	4	0	21	24	45	11	12	0.6	0.0	3.0	3.4	6.4	1.6	1.7	0
2023	Hawthorn	13	10	10	4	75	35	110	26	21	1.0	0.4	7.5	3.5	11.0	2.6	2.1	0
2024	Hawthorn	13	13	16	19	94	37	131	40	28	1.2	1.5	7.2	2.8	10.1	3.1	2.2	2
2025	Hawthorn	13	14	22	22	106	63	169	31	33	1.6	1.6	7.6	4.5	12.1	2.2	2.4	7
Career			44	52	45	296	159	455	108	94	1.2	1.0	6.7	3.6	10.3	2.5	2.1	9

== Honours and achievements ==
Team

- McClelland Trophy (Hawthorn): 2024

Individual

- AFL Women's All-Australian team: 2025
- Hawthorn best and fairest: 2025
- 3× Hawthorn leading goalkicker: 2023, 2024, 2025
