= Aileen Gilroy =

Australian rules footballer

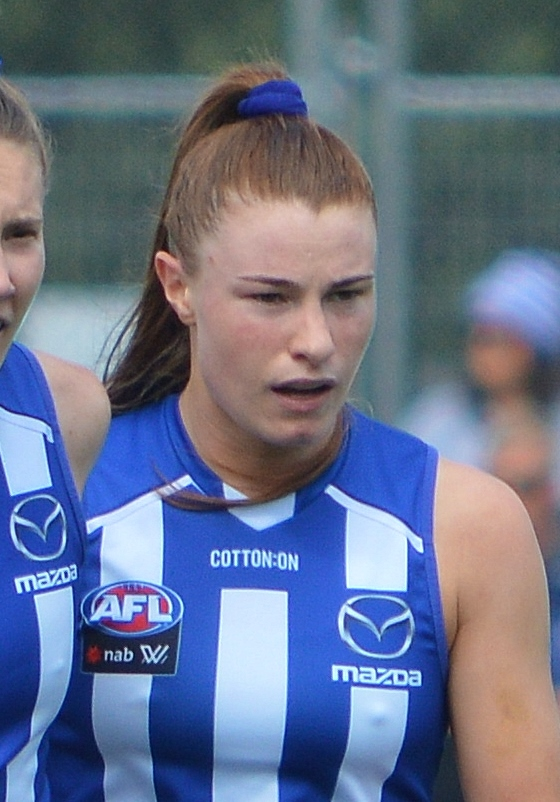
- Gilroy playing Australian rules football with North Melbourne in March 2021

Personal information
- Born: 1 March 1993 (age 33); Killala, County Mayo, Ireland
- Draft: 2019 rookie signing
- Debut: Round 1, 2020, North Melbourne vs. Melbourne, at Casey Fields
- Height: 172 cm (5 ft 8 in)
- Position: Defender

Club information
- Current club: Hawthorn
- Number: 7

Playing career^{1}
Years	Club	Games (Goals)
2020–2022	North Melbourne	28 (0)
2022–2025	Hawthorn	42 (23)
Total		70 (23)
- ^{1} Playing statistics correct to the end of 2025.

Career highlights
- AFL Women's All-Australian Team: 2024

Aileen Gilroy (born 1 March 1993) is a former Australian rules footballer who played with the North Melbourne Football Club and Hawthorn Football Club in the AFL Women's (AFLW). Gilroy signed with North Melbourne as a rookie during the 2019 rookie signing period in August. She made her debut against Melbourne at Casey Fields in the opening round of the 2020 season.

== Australian rules football career ==
On 30 August 2019, Gilroy signed with North Melbourne as a rookie during the 2019 rookie signing period, joining her fellow countrywoman Mairéad Seoighe at the club. Quickly establishing herself as a fan-favourite, Gilroy made 7 appearances for the Kangaroos in 2020, averaging almost 10 disposals a game, and finished fifth in the best-and-fairest count. It was revealed she signed on with the club for two more seasons on 17 June 2021, tying her to the club until the end of 2023. In May 2022, Gilroy surprisingly joined expansion club Hawthorn, after telling North Melbourne she would recommit to them.

=== Statistics ===
Updated to the end of 2025.

Legend
G	Goals	K	Kicks	D	Disposals	T	Tackles
B	Behinds	H	Handballs	M	Marks

Season	Team	No.	Games	Totals							Averages (per game)							Votes
Season	Team	No.	Games	G	B	K	H	D	M	T	G	B	K	H	D	M	T	Votes
2020	North Melbourne	8	7	0	0	50	18	68	12	8	0.0	0.0	7.1	2.6	9.7	1.7	1.1	0
2021	North Melbourne	8	10	0	1	102	20	122	21	28	0.0	0.1	10.2	2.0	12.2	2.1	2.8	0
2022 (S6)	North Melbourne	8	11	0	1	102	30	132	19	23	0.0	0.1	9.3	2.7	12.0	1.7	2.1	1
2022 (S7)	Hawthorn	7	10	3	5	112	11	123	14	53	0.3	0.5	11.2	1.1	12.3	1.4	5.3	0
2023	Hawthorn	7	10	4	4	94	21	115	16	41	0.4	0.4	9.4	2.1	11.5	1.6	4.1	0
2024	Hawthorn	7	13	14	11	156	17	173	18	45	1.1	0.8	12.0	1.3	13.3	1.4	3.5	7
2025	Hawthorn	7	9	2	12	103	21	124	20	32	0.2	1.3	11.4	2.3	13.8	2.2	3.6	0
Career			70	23	34	719	138	857	120	230	0.3	0.5	10.3	2.0	12.2	1.7	3.3	8

== Gaelic football career ==
=== Club ===
At club level, Gilroy has played for St Brigids and IT Sligo. In 2009, she was voted Connacht Young Player of the Year.

=== Inter-county ===
In 2017, she won her first All-Star.

== Association football career ==
Aileen Gilroy
Personal information
- Full name: Aileen Gilroy
- Date of birth: 1 March 1993 (age 33)
- Place of birth: Killala, County Mayo, Ireland
- Height: 1.72 m (5 ft 8 in)
- Positions: Midfielder; forward

Youth career
- Killala AFC

Senior career*
Years	Team	Apps	(Gls)
2011–2014	Castlebar Celtic		

International career
- Republic of Ireland U17
- Republic of Ireland U19
- Republic of Ireland
- * Club domestic league appearances and goals

=== Youth ===
A Killala native, Gilroy attended St. Patrick's College, Lacken Cross and played youth football for Killala AFC. In February 2010, she helped St. Patrick's College win the Umbro FAI Schools Senior B Girls All-Ireland Final against St Kilian's German School.

=== Club ===
In 2011, Gilroy signed for Castlebar Celtic, one of the six teams that competed in the WNL's inaugural 2011–12 season, and stayed at the club until 2014.

=== International ===
As a teenager, Gilroy represented the Republic of Ireland at U17 and U19 level. She represented Ireland at the 2010 FIFA U-17 Women's World Cup, where Ireland reached the quarter-finals. In June 2013, she was named to the squad for the 2013 Summer Universiade.

In February 2014, Gilroy received her first senior call-up.

== Honours ==
=== Gaelic football ===
Mayo

- All-Ireland Senior Ladies' Football Championship
  - Runners-up: 2017

Individual

- Connacht Young Player of the Year
  - Winner: 2009
- Ladies' Gaelic football All Stars Awards
  - Winner: 2017

=== Australian rules football ===
Team

- McClelland Trophy (Hawthorn): 2024

Individual

- AFL Women's All-Australian team: 2024
