= List of AFL Women's debuts in 2024 =

The following is a list of all players in the AFL Women's (AFLW) who have either made their AFLW debut or played for a new club during the 2024 AFL Women's season.

== Summary ==
Summary of debuts in 2024
Club	Debut		Total
Club	AFLW	New club	Total
Adelaide	3	0	3
Brisbane	2	2	4
Carlton	3	4	7
Collingwood	5	4	9
Essendon	3	2	5
Fremantle	1	4	5
Geelong	4	1	5
Gold Coast	5	3	8
Greater Western Sydney	5	4	9
Hawthorn	5	2	7
Melbourne	5	4	9
North Melbourne	0	2	2
Port Adelaide	5	3	8
Richmond	3	3	6
St Kilda	3	2	5
Sydney	4	2	6
West Coast	7	3	10
Western Bulldogs	4	6	10
Total	67	51	118

== AFL Women's debuts ==
Name	Club	Age at debut	Debut round	Notes
Sarah Grunden	Sydney		1	Pick 16, 2023 AFL Women's draft
Kiara Hillier	Sydney		1	Trade (BL), 2023–24 AFL Women's player movement period
Muireann Atkinson	Collingwood		1	2023 Rookie signing (Gaelic football)
Lucy Cronin	Collingwood		1	Pick 9, 2023 AFL Women's draft
Sanne Bakker	West Coast		1	Replacement player, 2023–24 AFL Women's player movement period
Georgie Cleaver	West Coast		1	Pick 39, 2023 AFL Women's draft
Tess Lyons	West Coast		1	Replacement player, 2023–24 AFL Women's player movement period
Jessica Rentsch	West Coast		1	Pick 2, 2023 AFL Women's draft
Verity Simmons	West Coast		1	2023 Rookie signing(Netball)
Charley Ryan	Richmond		1	Pick 38, 2022 AFL Women's draft
Eilish O'Dowd	Greater Western Sydney		1	2023 Rookie signing (Gaelic football)
Kaitlyn Srhoj	Greater Western Sydney		1	Pick 3, 2023 AFL Women's draft
Brooke Barwick	Western Bulldogs		1	Pick 4, 2023 AFL Women's draft
Cleo Buttifant	Western Bulldogs		1	Pick 11, 2023 AFL Women's draft
Elaine Grigg	Western Bulldogs		1	Pick 6, 2023 AFL Women's draft
Kristie-Lee Weston-Turner	Western Bulldogs		1	Pick 1, 2023 AFL Women's draft
Amy Gaylor	Essendon		1	Expansion under-18 talent pathway pre-signing period, 2023–24 AFL Women's player movement period
Emily Gough	Essendon		1	Pick 20, 2023 AFL Women's draft
Tunisha Kikoak	Fremantle		1	Replacement player, 2023–24 AFL Women's player movement period
Kiara Bischa	Gold Coast		1	Pick 50, 2023 AFL Women's draft
Annabel Kievit	Gold Coast		1	Pick 52, 2023 AFL Women's draft
Charlotte Simpson	St Kilda		1	Pick 47, 2023 AFL Women's draft (Father-daughter)
Kate Kenny	Geelong		1	2023 Rookie signing (Gaelic football)
Grace Beasley	Melbourne		1	2023 Rookie signing (Basketball)
Ryleigh Wotherspoon	Melbourne		1	Pick 12, 2023 AFL Women's draft
Molly Brooksby	Port Adelaide		1	Expansion under-18 talent pathway pre-signing period, 2023–24 AFL Women's player movement period
Shineah Goody	Port Adelaide		1	Expansion under-18 talent pathway pre-signing period, 2023–24 AFL Women's player movement period
Piper Window	Port Adelaide		1	Pick 19, 2023 AFL Women's draft
Brooke Boileau	Adelaide		1	Pick 22, 2023 AFL Women's draft
Laura Stone	Hawthorn		1	Expansion under-18 talent pathway pre-signing period, 2023–24 AFL Women's player movement period
Jess Vukic	Hawthorn		1	Expansion under-18 talent pathway pre-signing period, 2023–24 AFL Women's player movement period
Mikayla Williamson	Hawthorn		1	Pick 17, 2023 AFL Women's draft
Lulu Beatty	Carlton		1	Pick 5, 2023 AFL Women's supplementary draft
Lila Keck	Carlton		1	Pick 7, 2023 AFL Women's draft
Alyssia Pisano	Melbourne		2	Pick 5, 2023 AFL Women's draft
Jayme Harken	West Coast		2	Replacement player, 2023–24 AFL Women's player movement period
Chloe Adams	Essendon		2	Pick 38, 2023 AFL Women's draft
Amber Schutte	Collingwood		2	Pick 32, 2023 AFL Women's draft
Hayley McLaughlin	Hawthorn		2	Expansion under-18 talent pathway pre-signing period, 2023–24 AFL Women's player movement period
Isabel Bacon	Richmond		2	Pick 13, 2023 AFL Women's draft
Mackenzie Ford	Richmond		2	Pick 43, 2023 AFL Women's draft
Courtney Murphy	Greater Western Sydney		2	Trade (BL), 2023–24 AFL Women's player movement period
Lara Hausegger	Sydney		2	Pick 33, 2023 AFL Women's draft
Octavia Di Donato	West Coast		3	Replacement player, 2023–24 AFL Women's player movement period
Sophie Peters	Brisbane		3	Pick 21, 2023 AFL Women's draft
Holly Cooper	Sydney		3	Expansion under-18 talent pathway pre-signing period, 2023–24 AFL Women's player movement period
Emmelie Fiedler	St Kilda		3	Replacement player, 2023–24 AFL Women's player movement period
Lauren McConville	Gold Coast		3	Replacement player, 2023–24 AFL Women's player movement period
Sarah Ingram	Collingwood		4	Replacement player, 2023–24 AFL Women's player movement period
Evie Long	Brisbane		4	Pick 15, 2023 AFL Women's draft
Caitlin Thorne	Geelong		4	Replacement player, 2023–24 AFL Women's player movement period
Amy Boyle-Carr	Adelaide		4	2023 Rookie signing (Gaelic football)
Alissa Brook	Port Adelaide		5	Pick 25, 2023 AFL Women's draft
Meg Robinson	Carlton		5	Pick 31, 2023 AFL Women's draft
Georgia Clark	Collingwood		5	Pick 8, 2023 AFL Women's draft
Keely Fullerton	Gold Coast		5	Pick 36, 2023 AFL Women's draft
Bryde O'Rourke	Geelong		6	Pick 23, 2023 AFL Women's draft (Father-daughter)
Taya Oliver	Gold Coast		6	Pick 44, 2023 AFL Women's draft
Delany Madigan	Melbourne		6	Pick 55, 2023 AFL Women's draft
Kiera Whiley	St Kilda		7	Pick 10, 2023 AFL Women's draft
Jemma Ramsdale	Greater Western Sydney		7	replacement player, 2023–24 AFL Women's player movement period
Lily Tarlinton	Adelaide		7	Pick 34, 2023 AFL Women's draft
Chantal Mason	Geelong		7	Pick 18, 2023 AFL Women's draft
Sophie Butterworth	Hawthorn		8	Pick 45, 2023 AFL Women's draft
Saraid Taylor	Melbourne		8	2022 Rookie signing (Basketball)
Jo Miller	Port Adelaide		9	Replacement player, 2023–24 AFL Women's player movement period
Indigo Linde	Greater Western Sydney		10	Pick 40, 2023 AFL Women's draft

== Change of AFL Women's club ==
Name	Club	Age at debut	Debut round	Former club/s	Recruiting method
Hayley Bullas	Sydney		1	West Coast	Delisted free agent, 2022–23 AFL Women's player movement period
Giselle Davies	Sydney		1	Gold Coast	Trade, 2023–24 AFL Women's player movement period
Annie Lee	Collingwood		1	Carlton	Trade, 2023–24 AFL Women's player movement period
Carly Remmos	Collingwood		1	Geelong	Replacement player, 2023–24 AFL Women's player movement period
Alison Drennan	West Coast		1	North Melbourne, St Kilda & Gold Coast	Trade, 2023–24 AFL Women's player movement period
Jess Hosking	West Coast		1	Carlton & Richmond	Delisted free agent, 2023–24 AFL Women's player movement period
Ally Dallaway	Richmond		1	Greater Western Sydney	Trade, 2023–24 AFL Women's player movement period
Jodie Hicks	Richmond		1	Greater Western Sydney	Trade, 2023–24 AFL Women's player movement period
Mikayla Pauga	Greater Western Sydney		1	Brisbane	Trade, 2023–24 AFL Women's player movement period
Claire Ransom	Greater Western Sydney		1	Gold Coast	Delisted free agent, 2023–24 AFL Women's player movement period
Lauren Ahrens	Western Bulldogs		1	Gold Coast	Trade, 2023–24 AFL Women's player movement period
Ellie Gavalas	Western Bulldogs		1	North Melbourne	Trade, 2023–24 AFL Women's player movement period
Analea McKee	Western Bulldogs		1	Brisbane	Trade, 2023–24 AFL Women's player movement period
Jasmyn Smith	Western Bulldogs		1	Gold Coast	Trade, 2023–24 AFL Women's player movement period
Maddi Gay	Essendon		1	Carlton & Melbourne	Trade, 2023–24 AFL Women's player movement period
Bess Keaney	Essendon		1	Gold Coast	Trade, 2023–24 AFL Women's player movement period
Ashleigh Brazill	Fremantle		1	Collingwood	Trade, 2023–24 AFL Women's player movement period
Aisling McCarthy	Fremantle		1	Western Bulldogs & West Coast	Trade, 2023–24 AFL Women's player movement period
Gabby Newton	Fremantle		1	Western Bulldogs	Trade, 2023–24 AFL Women's player movement period
Katie Lynch	Gold Coast		1	Collingwood & Western Bulldogs	Trade, 2023–24 AFL Women's player movement period
Ella Smith	Gold Coast		1	Brisbane	Trade, 2023–24 AFL Women's player movement period
Charlotte Wilson	Gold Coast		1	Carlton & Melbourne	Trade, 2023–24 AFL Women's player movement period
Rene Caris	St Kilda		1	Geelong & Greater Western Sydney	Trade, 2023–24 AFL Women's player movement period
Paige Trudgeon	St Kilda		1	Carlton	Trade, 2023–24 AFL Women's player movement period
Grace Hill	Melbourne		1	Greater Western Sydney	Replacement player, 2023–24 AFL Women's player movement period
Teagan Germech	Port Adelaide		1	Greater Western Sydney	Replacement player, 2023–24 AFL Women's player movement period
Kirsty Lamb	Port Adelaide		1	Western Bulldogs	Trade, 2023–24 AFL Women's player movement period
Caitlin Wendland	Port Adelaide		1	Brisbane	Replacement player, 2023–24 AFL Women's player movement period
Casey Sherriff	Hawthorn		1	Melbourne	Trade, 2023–24 AFL Women's player movement period
Eliza West	Hawthorn		1	Melbourne	Trade, 2023–24 AFL Women's player movement period
Celine Moody	Carlton		1	Western Bulldogs	Trade, 2023–24 AFL Women's player movement period
Shanae Davison	Brisbane		1	West Coast	Trade, 2023–24 AFL Women's player movement period
Libby Birch	North Melbourne		1	Melbourne & Western Bulldogs	Trade, 2023–24 AFL Women's player movement period
Eleanor Hartill	Brisbane		2	West Coast	Trade, 2023–24 AFL Women's player movement period
Tarni Brown	Carlton		2	Collingwood	Trade, 2023–24 AFL Women's player movement period
Lucy Burke	North Melbourne		2	St Kilda	Replacement player, 2023
Jordan Ivey	Collingwood		3	Carlton, Geelong & Melbourne	Replacement player, 2023–24 AFL Women's player movement period
Gabby Biedenweg-Webster	Fremantle		3	Gold Coast	Replacement player, 2023–24 AFL Women's player movement period
Kaylee Kimber	Western Bulldogs		4	Gold Coast	Replacement player, 2023–24 AFL Women's player movement period
Tamara Luke	Richmond		4	St Kilda & Hawthorn	Replacement player, 2023–24 AFL Women's player movement period
Denby Taylor	Melbourne		4	Geelong	Replacement player, 2023–24 AFL Women's player movement period
Aliesha Newman	Greater Western Sydney		4	Melbourne, Collingwood & Sydney	Trade, 2023–24 AFL Women's player movement period
Yasmin Duursma	Carlton		5	Port Adelaide	Trade, 2023–24 AFL Women's player movement period
Lily Johnson	Melbourne		5	Port Adelaide	Trade, 2023–24 AFL Women's player movement period
Annise Bradfield	Greater Western Sydney		5	Gold Coast	Pick 23, 2023 AFL Women's supplementary draft
Roxanne Roux	West Coast		5	Fremantle	Trade, 2023–24 AFL Women's player movement period
Sarah D'Arcy	Melbourne		6	Collingwood & Richmond	Top up player, 2024 AFL Women's season
Zimmorlei Farquharson	Western Bulldogs		6	Brisbane	Trade, 2023–24 AFL Women's player movement period
Bella K. Smith	Geelong		6	Brisbane	Trade, 2023–24 AFL Women's player movement period
Jade Halfpenny	Carlton		9	Port Adelaide	Replacement player, 2023–24 AFL Women's player movement period
Mikayla Hyde	Collingwood		10	Fremantle	Trade, 2023–24 AFL Women's player movement period

== See also ==
- List of AFL debuts in 2024
