= 2023–24 AFL Women's player movement period =

Eighth player movement period of the AFL Women's (AFLW) competition

The 2023–24 AFL Women's player movement period consisted of the various periods when the 18 clubs in the AFL Women's (AFLW) competition could recruit players following the 2023 AFL Women's season.

== Retirements and delistings ==
Name	Club	Date	Status	Ref.
Akec Makur Chuot	Hawthorn	26 October 2023	Retired	
Erin Phillips	Port Adelaide	31 October 2023	Retired	
Tegan Cunningham	Hawthorn	31 October 2023	Retired	
Richelle Cranston	Western Bulldogs	31 October 2023	Retired	
Jess Wuetschner	Essendon	1 November 2023	Retired	
Renee Garing	Geelong	1 November 2023	Retired	
Jess Sedunary	West Coast	1 November 2023	Retired	
Tamara Luke	Hawthorn	2 November 2023	Retired	
Phoebe McWilliams	Carlton	2 November 2023	Retired	
Catherine Brown	Hawthorn	3 November 2023	Retired	
Laquoiya Cockatoo-Motlap	Port Adelaide	9 November 2023	Delisted	
Jade de Melo	Port Adelaide	9 November 2023	Delisted	
Jade Halfpenny	Port Adelaide	9 November 2023	Delisted	
Maggie MacLachlan	Port Adelaide	9 November 2023	Delisted	
Jacqui Yorston	Port Adelaide	9 November 2023	Delisted	
Janet Baird	Hawthorn	10 November 2023	Delisted	
Sarah Perkins	Hawthorn	10 November 2023	Delisted	
Isabella Simmons	West Coast	10 November 2023	Retired	
Tess Cattle	Greater Western Sydney	15 November 2023	Delisted	
Zara Hamilton	Greater Western Sydney	15 November 2023	Delisted	
Grace Hill	Greater Western Sydney	15 November 2023	Delisted	
Tait Mackrill	Greater Western Sydney	15 November 2023	Delisted	
Leah Cutting	Essendon	16 November 2023	Delisted	
Joanne Doonan	Essendon	16 November 2023	Delisted	
Meagan Kiely	Richmond	16 November 2023	Retired	
Bailey Hunt	Western Bulldogs	23 November 2023	Delisted	
Georgina Fowler	Melbourne	29 November 2023	Retired	
Jaide Anthony	Sydney	29 November 2023	Delisted	
Kiara Beesley	Sydney	29 November 2023	Delisted	
Sarah Ford	Sydney	29 November 2023	Delisted	
Jenny Higgins	Sydney	29 November 2023	Delisted	
Kate Reynolds	Sydney	29 November 2023	Delisted	
Jess Hosking	Richmond	29 November 2023	Delisted	
Stephanie Williams	Richmond	29 November 2023	Delisted	
Emma Humphries	West Coast	29 November 2023	Retired	
Aimee Schmidt	West Coast	29 November 2023	Retired	
McKenzie Dowrick	Adelaide	1 December 2023	Delisted	
Amber Ward	Adelaide	1 December 2023	Delisted	
Sammy Gooden	Geelong	1 December 2023	Delisted	
Ingrid Houtsma	Geelong	1 December 2023	Delisted	
Mia Skinner	Geelong	1 December 2023	Delisted	
Yvonne Bonner	Adelaide	4 December 2023	Retired	
Lisa Whiteley	Adelaide	4 December 2023	Retired	
Jordan Ivey	Melbourne	5 December 2023	Delisted	
Sammie Johnson	Melbourne	5 December 2023	Delisted	
Daisy Bateman	Western Bulldogs	6 December 2023	Delisted	
Rosie Dillon	St Kilda	6 December 2023	Delisted	
Deanna Jolliffe	St Kilda	6 December 2023	Delisted	
Erin McKinnon	St Kilda	6 December 2023	Delisted	
Renee Saulitis	St Kilda	6 December 2023	Delisted	
Jayde Van Dyk	St Kilda	6 December 2023	Delisted	
Emmelie Fiedler	Fremantle	7 December 2023	Delisted	
Sarah Wielstra	Fremantle	7 December 2023	Delisted	
Olivia Barber	Collingwood	8 December 2023	Delisted	
Sophie Casey	Collingwood	8 December 2023	Delisted	
Imogen Evans	Collingwood	8 December 2023	Delisted	
Joanna Lin	Collingwood	8 December 2023	Delisted	
Gabrielle Biedenweg-Webster	Gold Coast	8 December 2023	Delisted	
Imogen Milford	Carlton	9 December 2023	Delisted	
Daisy Walker	Carlton	9 December 2023	Delisted	
Chloe Wrigley	Carlton	9 December 2023	Delisted	
Kaylee Kimber	Gold Coast	12 December 2023	Delisted	
Tahlia Meyer	Gold Coast	12 December 2023	Delisted	
Claire Ransom	Gold Coast	12 December 2023	Delisted	
Kate Bartlett	West Coast	13 December 2023	Retired	
Krstel Petrevski	West Coast	13 December 2023	Delisted	
Ella G. Smith	West Coast	13 December 2023	Delisted	
Alana Barba	Essendon	14 December 2023	Delisted	
Renee Tierney	Essendon	14 December 2023	Delisted	
Bridie Kennedy	Sydney	14 December 2023	Delisted (Note: Kennedy chose to delist herself for personal reasons)	
Lucy Burke	North Melbourne	15 December 2023	Delisted (Note: Committed to re-selecting in the national draft if available)	
Hannah Bowey	North Melbourne	15 December 2023	Delisted	
Charli Granville	North Melbourne	15 December 2023	Delisted	
Cassidy Mailer	North Melbourne	15 December 2023	Delisted	
Sophia McCarthy	North Melbourne	15 December 2023	Delisted	
Litonya Cockatoo-Motlap	Port Adelaide	15 December 2023	Delisted	
Phoebe Monahan	Brisbane	15 December 2023	Retired	
Danielle Marshall	Essendon	15 December 2023	Retired	
Emily Smith	Collingwood	15 December 2023	Delisted	
Brooke Sheridan	Brisbane	15 December 2023	Delisted	
Caitlin Wendland	Brisbane	15 December 2023	Delisted	
Nikki Nield	Fremantle	15 December 2023	Delisted	
Airlie Runnalls	Fremantle	15 December 2023	Delisted	
Ailish Considine	North Melbourne	18 December 2023	Retired	
Kirsten McLeod	Western Bulldogs	18 December 2023	Retired	
Cat Phillips	Essendon	9 May 2024	Retired	

== Expansion under-18 talent pathway pre-signing period ==
The expansion under-18 talent pathway pre-signing period took place from 14 to 17 November 2023, allowing the four newest teams (Essendon, Hawthorn, Port Adelaide and Sydney) to sign players from their women's academies. (Note: Upon their entry into the competition, the four clubs were each given the option of signing three academy players over a two-year period, however this was extended to three years given the supplementary draft held earlier in 2023 was for overage players only.)

Name	Club	Date	Recruited from		Ref.
Name	Club	Date	Club	League	Ref.
Hayley McLaughlin	Hawthorn	14 November	Eastern Ranges	Talent League Girls	
Laura Stone	Hawthorn	14 November	Eastern Ranges	Talent League Girls	
Jess Vukic	Hawthorn	14 November	Eastern Ranges	Talent League Girls	
Lauren Young	Port Adelaide	15 November	West Adelaide	SANFL Women's League	
Molly Brooksby	Port Adelaide	16 November	Norwood	SANFL Women's League	
Amy Gaylor	Essendon	16 November	Calder Cannons	Talent League Girls	
Holly Cooper	Sydney	17 November	Manly Warringah Wolves	AFL Sydney Women's premier division	
Shineah Goody	Port Adelaide	17 November	Woodville-West Torrens	SANFL Women's League	

== Trade period ==
=== Trades ===
The trade period took place from 7 to 14 December 2023. A total of 41 players moved clubs during the eight-day period, which included an eleven-club trade on the final day that saw twelve players and 24 picks exchanged.

Pick #→	Draft pick was later on-traded to another club

Date	Clubs involved	Club	Received	Ref.
8 December	Brisbane / Western Bulldogs	Brisbane	Pick 41→	
8 December	Brisbane / Western Bulldogs	Western Bulldogs	Zimmorlei Farquharson	
8 December	Hawthorn / Melbourne	Hawthorn	Casey Sherriff	
8 December	Hawthorn / Melbourne	Hawthorn	Eliza West	
8 December	Hawthorn / Melbourne	Hawthorn	Pick 16	
8 December	Hawthorn / Melbourne	Melbourne	Pick 5	
8 December	Hawthorn / Melbourne	Melbourne	Pick 26→	
8 December	Carlton / Port Adelaide	Carlton	Yasmin Duursma	
8 December	Carlton / Port Adelaide	Carlton	Pick 25→	
8 December	Carlton / Port Adelaide	Port Adelaide	Pick 21→	
8 December	Fremantle / West Coast	Fremantle	Aisling McCarthy	
8 December	Fremantle / West Coast	West Coast	Roxanne Roux	
8 December	Fremantle / West Coast	West Coast	Pick 27→	
9 December	Collingwood / Richmond	Collingwood	Pick 9	
9 December	Collingwood / Richmond	Richmond	Pick 11→	
9 December	Collingwood / Richmond	Richmond	Pick 29→	
11 December	Melbourne / North Melbourne	Melbourne	Pick 19→	
11 December	Melbourne / North Melbourne	North Melbourne	Libby Birch	
11 December	Melbourne / North Melbourne	North Melbourne	Pick 35→	
11 December	Brisbane / Sydney	Brisbane	Pick 73→	
11 December	Brisbane / Sydney	Sydney	Kiara Hillier	
11 December	Carlton / Collingwood / North Melbourne / St Kilda	Carlton	Tarni Brown (from Collingwood)	
11 December	Carlton / Collingwood / North Melbourne / St Kilda	Carlton	Pick 48 (from Collingwood)	
11 December	Carlton / Collingwood / North Melbourne / St Kilda	Collingwood	Annie Lee (from Carlton)	
11 December	Carlton / Collingwood / North Melbourne / St Kilda	Collingwood	Pick 31→ (from St Kilda)	
11 December	Carlton / Collingwood / North Melbourne / St Kilda	Collingwood	Pick 59→ (from North Melbourne)	
11 December	Carlton / Collingwood / North Melbourne / St Kilda	North Melbourne	Pick 47 (from Carlton)	
11 December	Carlton / Collingwood / North Melbourne / St Kilda	St Kilda	Paige Trudgeon (from Carlton)	
11 December	Carlton / Collingwood / North Melbourne / St Kilda	St Kilda	Pick 52→ (from North Melbourne)	
12 December	Brisbane / Greater Western Sydney	Brisbane	Pick 24→	
12 December	Brisbane / Greater Western Sydney	Greater Western Sydney	Mikayla Pauga	
12 December	Brisbane / Greater Western Sydney	Greater Western Sydney	Pick 73→	
12 December	Carlton / North Melbourne / Western Bulldogs	Carlton	Celine Moody (from Western Bulldogs)	
12 December	Carlton / North Melbourne / Western Bulldogs	North Melbourne	Pick 25 (from Carlton)	
12 December	Carlton / North Melbourne / Western Bulldogs	Western Bulldogs	Ellie Gavalas (from North Melbourne)	
12 December	Carlton / North Melbourne / Western Bulldogs	Western Bulldogs	Vaomua Laloifi (from Carlton)	
12 December	Greater Western Sydney / St Kilda	Greater Western Sydney	Pick 52→	
12 December	Greater Western Sydney / St Kilda	St Kilda	Rene Caris	
12 December	Gold Coast / West Coast	Gold Coast	Pick 27→	
12 December	Gold Coast / West Coast	West Coast	Alison Drennan	
13 December	Brisbane / Collingwood / Gold Coast	Brisbane	Pick 68 (from Collingwood)	
13 December	Brisbane / Collingwood / Gold Coast	Collingwood	Kalinda Howarth (from Gold Coast)	
13 December	Brisbane / Collingwood / Gold Coast	Gold Coast	Ella K. Smith (from Brisbane)	
13 December	Brisbane / Collingwood / Gold Coast	Gold Coast	Pick 59 (from Collingwood)	
13 December	Gold Coast / North Melbourne	Gold Coast	Pick 35	
13 December	Gold Coast / North Melbourne	Gold Coast	Pick 38→	
13 December	Gold Coast / North Melbourne	North Melbourne	Pick 27	
13 December	Brisbane / Geelong / West Coast	Brisbane	Shanae Davison (from West Coast)	
13 December	Brisbane / Geelong / West Coast	Brisbane	Eleanor Hartill (from West Coast)	
13 December	Brisbane / Geelong / West Coast	Brisbane	Pick 36 (from Geelong)	
13 December	Brisbane / Geelong / West Coast	Brisbane	Pick 57 (from Geelong)	
13 December	Brisbane / Geelong / West Coast	Geelong	Bella Smith (from Brisbane)	
13 December	Brisbane / Geelong / West Coast	Geelong	Pick 32 (from Brisbane)	
13 December	Brisbane / Geelong / West Coast	Geelong	Pick 41 (from Brisbane)	
13 December	Brisbane / Geelong / West Coast	West Coast	Annabel Johnson (from Geelong)	
13 December	Brisbane / Geelong / West Coast	West Coast	Pick 24→ (from Brisbane)	
13 December	Greater Western Sydney / Richmond	Greater Western Sydney	Pick 30→	
13 December	Greater Western Sydney / Richmond	Greater Western Sydney	Pick 69	
13 December	Greater Western Sydney / Richmond	Richmond	Ally Dallaway	
13 December	Greater Western Sydney / Richmond	Richmond	Jodie Hicks	
13 December	Greater Western Sydney / Richmond	Richmond	Pick 43	
14 December	Essendon / Gold Coast	Essendon	Bess Keaney	
14 December	Essendon / Gold Coast	Essendon	Pick 72	
14 December	Essendon / Gold Coast	Gold Coast	Pick 53	
14 December	Gold Coast / Sydney	Gold Coast	Pick 55	
14 December	Gold Coast / Sydney	Sydney	Giselle Davies	
14 December	Greater Western Sydney / Sydney	Greater Western Sydney	Aliesha Newman	
14 December	Greater Western Sydney / Sydney	Greater Western Sydney	Pick 34→	
14 December	Greater Western Sydney / Sydney	Sydney	Pick 30	
14 December	Brisbane / Greater Western Sydney	Brisbane	Pick 34	
14 December	Brisbane / Greater Western Sydney	Greater Western Sydney	Courtney Murphy	
14 December	Brisbane / Greater Western Sydney	Greater Western Sydney	Pick 39	
14 December	Eleven clubs: Adelaide; Brisbane; Collingwood; Essendon; Fremantle; Gold Coast; Melbourne; Port Adelaide; Richmond; West Coast; Western Bulldogs	Adelaide	Pick 22 (from Western Bulldogs)	
14 December	Eleven clubs: Adelaide; Brisbane; Collingwood; Essendon; Fremantle; Gold Coast; Melbourne; Port Adelaide; Richmond; West Coast; Western Bulldogs	Adelaide	Pick 26 (from Melbourne)	
14 December	Eleven clubs: Adelaide; Brisbane; Collingwood; Essendon; Fremantle; Gold Coast; Melbourne; Port Adelaide; Richmond; West Coast; Western Bulldogs	Adelaide	Pick 33 (from Essendon)	
14 December	Eleven clubs: Adelaide; Brisbane; Collingwood; Essendon; Fremantle; Gold Coast; Melbourne; Port Adelaide; Richmond; West Coast; Western Bulldogs	Brisbane	Pick 21 (from Port Adelaide)	
14 December	Eleven clubs: Adelaide; Brisbane; Collingwood; Essendon; Fremantle; Gold Coast; Melbourne; Port Adelaide; Richmond; West Coast; Western Bulldogs	Brisbane	Pick 31 (from Collingwood)	
14 December	Eleven clubs: Adelaide; Brisbane; Collingwood; Essendon; Fremantle; Gold Coast; Melbourne; Port Adelaide; Richmond; West Coast; Western Bulldogs	Brisbane	Pick 46 (from Fremantle)	
14 December	Eleven clubs: Adelaide; Brisbane; Collingwood; Essendon; Fremantle; Gold Coast; Melbourne; Port Adelaide; Richmond; West Coast; Western Bulldogs	Collingwood	Mikayla Hyde (from Fremantle)	
14 December	Eleven clubs: Adelaide; Brisbane; Collingwood; Essendon; Fremantle; Gold Coast; Melbourne; Port Adelaide; Richmond; West Coast; Western Bulldogs	Collingwood	Pick 29 (from Richmond)	
14 December	Eleven clubs: Adelaide; Brisbane; Collingwood; Essendon; Fremantle; Gold Coast; Melbourne; Port Adelaide; Richmond; West Coast; Western Bulldogs	Essendon	Maddi Gay (from Melbourne)	
14 December	Eleven clubs: Adelaide; Brisbane; Collingwood; Essendon; Fremantle; Gold Coast; Melbourne; Port Adelaide; Richmond; West Coast; Western Bulldogs	Essendon	Pick 19 (from Melbourne)	
14 December	Eleven clubs: Adelaide; Brisbane; Collingwood; Essendon; Fremantle; Gold Coast; Melbourne; Port Adelaide; Richmond; West Coast; Western Bulldogs	Essendon	Pick 37 (from Adelaide)	
14 December	Eleven clubs: Adelaide; Brisbane; Collingwood; Essendon; Fremantle; Gold Coast; Melbourne; Port Adelaide; Richmond; West Coast; Western Bulldogs	Fremantle	Ashleigh Brazill (from Collingwood)	
14 December	Eleven clubs: Adelaide; Brisbane; Collingwood; Essendon; Fremantle; Gold Coast; Melbourne; Port Adelaide; Richmond; West Coast; Western Bulldogs	Fremantle	Gabby Newton (from Western Bulldogs)	
14 December	Eleven clubs: Adelaide; Brisbane; Collingwood; Essendon; Fremantle; Gold Coast; Melbourne; Port Adelaide; Richmond; West Coast; Western Bulldogs	Fremantle	Pick 61→ (from Western Bulldogs)	
14 December	Eleven clubs: Adelaide; Brisbane; Collingwood; Essendon; Fremantle; Gold Coast; Melbourne; Port Adelaide; Richmond; West Coast; Western Bulldogs	Gold Coast	Katie Lynch (from Western Bulldogs)	
14 December	Eleven clubs: Adelaide; Brisbane; Collingwood; Essendon; Fremantle; Gold Coast; Melbourne; Port Adelaide; Richmond; West Coast; Western Bulldogs	Gold Coast	Charlotte Wilson (from Melbourne)	
14 December	Eleven clubs: Adelaide; Brisbane; Collingwood; Essendon; Fremantle; Gold Coast; Melbourne; Port Adelaide; Richmond; West Coast; Western Bulldogs	Gold Coast	Pick 44 (from Port Adelaide)	
14 December	Eleven clubs: Adelaide; Brisbane; Collingwood; Essendon; Fremantle; Gold Coast; Melbourne; Port Adelaide; Richmond; West Coast; Western Bulldogs	Melbourne	Lily Johnson (from Port Adelaide)	
14 December	Eleven clubs: Adelaide; Brisbane; Collingwood; Essendon; Fremantle; Gold Coast; Melbourne; Port Adelaide; Richmond; West Coast; Western Bulldogs	Melbourne	Pick 12 (from Brisbane)	
14 December	Eleven clubs: Adelaide; Brisbane; Collingwood; Essendon; Fremantle; Gold Coast; Melbourne; Port Adelaide; Richmond; West Coast; Western Bulldogs	Melbourne	Pick 23 (from West Coast)	
14 December	Eleven clubs: Adelaide; Brisbane; Collingwood; Essendon; Fremantle; Gold Coast; Melbourne; Port Adelaide; Richmond; West Coast; Western Bulldogs	Melbourne	Pick 40 (from Adelaide)	
14 December	Eleven clubs: Adelaide; Brisbane; Collingwood; Essendon; Fremantle; Gold Coast; Melbourne; Port Adelaide; Richmond; West Coast; Western Bulldogs	Port Adelaide	Kirsty Lamb (from Western Bulldogs)	
14 December	Eleven clubs: Adelaide; Brisbane; Collingwood; Essendon; Fremantle; Gold Coast; Melbourne; Port Adelaide; Richmond; West Coast; Western Bulldogs	Port Adelaide	Pick 18 (from Adelaide)	
14 December	Eleven clubs: Adelaide; Brisbane; Collingwood; Essendon; Fremantle; Gold Coast; Melbourne; Port Adelaide; Richmond; West Coast; Western Bulldogs	Port Adelaide	Pick 24 (from West Coast)	
14 December	Eleven clubs: Adelaide; Brisbane; Collingwood; Essendon; Fremantle; Gold Coast; Melbourne; Port Adelaide; Richmond; West Coast; Western Bulldogs	Port Adelaide	Pick 56 (from Melbourne)	
14 December	Eleven clubs: Adelaide; Brisbane; Collingwood; Essendon; Fremantle; Gold Coast; Melbourne; Port Adelaide; Richmond; West Coast; Western Bulldogs	Richmond	Montana McKinnon (from Adelaide)	
14 December	Eleven clubs: Adelaide; Brisbane; Collingwood; Essendon; Fremantle; Gold Coast; Melbourne; Port Adelaide; Richmond; West Coast; Western Bulldogs	Richmond	Pick 13 (from Essendon)	
14 December	Eleven clubs: Adelaide; Brisbane; Collingwood; Essendon; Fremantle; Gold Coast; Melbourne; Port Adelaide; Richmond; West Coast; Western Bulldogs	West Coast	Pick 14 (from Gold Coast)	
14 December	Eleven clubs: Adelaide; Brisbane; Collingwood; Essendon; Fremantle; Gold Coast; Melbourne; Port Adelaide; Richmond; West Coast; Western Bulldogs	West Coast	Pick 38 (from Gold Coast)	
14 December	Eleven clubs: Adelaide; Brisbane; Collingwood; Essendon; Fremantle; Gold Coast; Melbourne; Port Adelaide; Richmond; West Coast; Western Bulldogs	Western Bulldogs	Lauren Ahrens (from Gold Coast)	
14 December	Eleven clubs: Adelaide; Brisbane; Collingwood; Essendon; Fremantle; Gold Coast; Melbourne; Port Adelaide; Richmond; West Coast; Western Bulldogs	Western Bulldogs	Analea McKee (from Brisbane)	
14 December	Eleven clubs: Adelaide; Brisbane; Collingwood; Essendon; Fremantle; Gold Coast; Melbourne; Port Adelaide; Richmond; West Coast; Western Bulldogs	Western Bulldogs	Jasmyn Smith (from Gold Coast)	
14 December	Eleven clubs: Adelaide; Brisbane; Collingwood; Essendon; Fremantle; Gold Coast; Melbourne; Port Adelaide; Richmond; West Coast; Western Bulldogs	Western Bulldogs	Pick 4 (from Port Adelaide)	
14 December	Eleven clubs: Adelaide; Brisbane; Collingwood; Essendon; Fremantle; Gold Coast; Melbourne; Port Adelaide; Richmond; West Coast; Western Bulldogs	Western Bulldogs	Pick 6 (from Fremantle)	
14 December	Eleven clubs: Adelaide; Brisbane; Collingwood; Essendon; Fremantle; Gold Coast; Melbourne; Port Adelaide; Richmond; West Coast; Western Bulldogs	Western Bulldogs	Pick 11 (from Richmond)	
14 December	Eleven clubs: Adelaide; Brisbane; Collingwood; Essendon; Fremantle; Gold Coast; Melbourne; Port Adelaide; Richmond; West Coast; Western Bulldogs	Western Bulldogs	Pick 51 (from Fremantle)	
14 December	Fremantle / Greater Western Sydney	Fremantle	Pick 52	
14 December	Fremantle / Greater Western Sydney	Fremantle	Pick 73	
14 December	Fremantle / Greater Western Sydney	Greater Western Sydney	Pick 61	
14 December	Fremantle / Greater Western Sydney	Greater Western Sydney	Pick 66	

=== Summary ===
The following table summarises the players and picks that were traded in and out of each club during the trade period (excluding picks that were later on-traded) prior to the draft order being finalised on 17 December.

Club	In	Out
Adelaide	22, 26, 33	Montana McKinnon, 18, 37, 40
Brisbane	Shanae Davison, Eleanor Hartill, 21, 31, 34, 36, 46, 57, 68, 73	Zimmorlei Farquharson, Kiara Hillier, Analea McKee, Courtney Murphy, Mikayla Pauga, Bella Smith, Ella K. Smith, 12, 32, 39, 73
Carlton	Tarni Brown, Yasmin Duursma, Celine Moody, 48	Annie Lee, Vaomua Laloifi, Paige Trudgeon, 21, 47
Collingwood	Kalinda Howarth, Mikayla Hyde, Annie Lee, 9, 59	Ashleigh Brazill, Tarni Brown, 11, 48, 59, 68
Essendon	Maddi Gay, Bess Keaney, 19, 37, 72	13, 33, 53
Fremantle	Ashleigh Brazill, Aisling McCarthy, Gabby Newton, 52, 73	Mikayla Hyde, Roxanne Roux, 6, 27, 46, 51, 61, 66
Geelong	Bella Smith, 32, 41	Annabel Johnson, 36, 57
Gold Coast	Katie Lynch, Ella K. Smith, Charlotte Wilson, 27, 35, 44, 53, 55, 59	Lauren Ahrens, Giselle Davies, Alison Drennan, Kalinda Howarth, Bess Keaney, Jasmyn Smith, 14, 27, 72
Greater Western Sydney	Courtney Murphy, Aliesha Newman, Mikayla Pauga, 39, 52, 69, 73	Rene Caris, Ally Dallaway, Jodie Hicks, 24, 43, 61, 66
Hawthorn	Casey Sherriff, Eliza West, 16	5, 26
Melbourne	Lily Johnson, 5, 12, 23, 40	Libby Birch, Maddi Gay, Casey Sherriff, Eliza West, Charlotte Wilson, 16, 35, 56
North Melbourne	Libby Birch, 25, 27, 47	Ellie Gavalas, 19, 38, 52, 59
Port Adelaide	Kirsty Lamb, 18, 24, 56	Yasmin Duursma, Lily Johnson, 4, 25, 44
Richmond	Ally Dallaway, Jodie Hicks, Montana McKinnon, 13, 43	9, 30, 69
St Kilda	Rene Caris, Paige Trudgeon	31
Sydney	Giselle Davies, Kiara Hillier, 30	Aliesha Newman, 34, 55, 73
West Coast	Alison Drennan, Annabel Johnson, Roxanne Roux, 14, 38	Shanae Davison, Eleanor Hartill, Aisling McCarthy, 23
Western Bulldogs	Lauren Ahrens, Zimmorlei Farquharson, Ellie Gavalas, Vaomua Laloifi, Analea McKee, Jasmyn Smith, 4, 6, 11, 51	Kirsty Lamb, Katie Lynch, Gabby Newton, 22, 41, 61

== Delisted free agency ==
Name	New club	Previous club	Date	Ref.
Claire Ransom	Greater Western Sydney	Gold Coast	15 December 2023	
Daisy Walker	Greater Western Sydney	Carlton	15 December 2023	
Jess Hosking	West Coast	Richmond	15 December 2023	

== Draft ==
The national draft was held on 18 December 2023.

== Replacement players ==
Where players were moved to inactive list after the draft had taken place, due to injury, personal reasons, retirement or pregnancy, the clubs were allowed to recruit replacement players.

Name	Club	Recruited from		Replacing	Date	Ref.
Name	Club	Club	League	Replacing	Date	Ref.
Grace Hill	Melbourne	Greater Western Sydney	AFL Women's	Jacinta Hose (injury)	20 December 2023	
Sanne Bakker	West Coast	Oakleigh Chargers	Talent League Girls	Matilda Sergeant (knee injury)	24 April 2024	
Tunisha Kikoak	Fremantle	Tasmania Devils	Talent League Girls	Kiara Bowers (pregnancy)	8 May 2024	
Brooke Sheridan	Essendon	North Melbourne	VFL Women's	Cat Phillips (retired)	9 May 2024	
Caitlin Wendland	Port Adelaide	Central District	SANFL Women's League	Lauren Young (injury)	17 May 2024	
Tegan Germech	Port Adelaide	Greater Western Sydney	AFL Women's	Hannah Dunn (pregnancy)	31 May 2024	
Caitlin Thorne	Geelong	Box Hill	VFL Women's	Erin Hoare (retirement)	21 June 2024	
Gabby Biedenweg-Webster	Fremantle	Williamstown	VFL Women's	Ange Stannett (injury)	24 June 2024	
Denby Taylor	Melbourne	Geelong Cats	VFL Women's	Aimee Mackin (injury)	3 July 2024	
Emmelie Fiedler	St Kilda	Fremantle	AFL Women's	Bethany Pinchin (injury)	9 July 2024	
Carly Remmos	Collingwood	Collingwood	VFL Women's	Nell Morris-Dalton (injury)	19 July 2024	
Jade Halfpenny	Carlton	Port Adelaide	AFL Women's	Erone Fitzpatrick (injury)	19 July 2024	
Lauren McConville	Gold Coast	Armagh	Ireland	Sienna McMullen (injury)	23 July 2024	
Imogen Evans	Collingwood	Bond University	QAFL Women's	Aishling Sheridan (personal)	26 July 2024	
Octavia Di Donato	West Coast	Carlton	VFL Women's	Dana Hooker (pregnancy)	6 August 2024	
Jemma Ramsdale	Greater Western Sydney	Collingwood	VFL Women's	Daisy Walker (injury)	8 August 2024	
Jayme Harken	West Coast	Claremont	WAFL Women's	Annabel Johnson (injury)	14 August 2024	
Tess Lyons	West Coast	Subiaco	WAFL Women's	Kayley Kavanagh (injury)	14 August 2024	
Jo Miller	Port Adelaide	Glenelg	SANFL Women's League	Indy Tahau (injury)	19 August 2024	
Tamara Luke	Richmond	Box Hill	VFL Women's	Montana McKinnon (injury)	21 August 2024	
Kaylee Kimber	Western Bulldogs	Southport	QAFL Women's	Mua Laloifi (injury)	27 August 2024	
