= 2026–27 AFL Women's player movement period =

Eleventh player movement period of the AFL Women's (AFLW) competition

The 2026–27 AFL Women's player movement period will consist of the various periods when the 18 clubs in the AFL Women's (AFLW) competition can recruit players following the 2026 AFL Women's season.

== Retirements and delistings ==
Name	Club	Date	Status	Ref.
Ashleigh Brazill	Fremantle	1 September 2026	Retired	
Kate Dempsey	Richmond	12 October 2026	Retired	
Justine Mules-Robinson	Port Adelaide	19 October 2026	Retired	
Jamie Stanton	Gold Coast	20 October 2026	Retired	
Amelia Radford	Essendon	23 October 2026	Retired	
Alicia Eva	Greater Western Sydney	23 October 2026	Retired	
Sophie Alexander	Essendon	27 October 2026	Retired	
Belinda Smith	West Coast	28 October 2026	Retired	
Isabel Huntington	Greater Western Sydney	28 October 2026	Retired	
Sabrina Frederick	Collingwood	30 October 2026	Retired	
Brooke Walker	Essendon	1 November 2026	Retired	
Lauren Ahrens	Western Bulldogs	4 November 2026	Retired	
Sanne Bakker	West Coast	4 November 2026	Delisted	
Alison Drennan	West Coast	4 November 2026	Delisted	
Natasha Enwistle	West Coast	4 November 2026	Delisted	
Roxy Roux	West Coast	4 November 2026	Delisted	
Brooke Brown	Essendon	5 November 2026	Delisted	
Maggie MacLachlan	Essendon	5 November 2026	Delisted	
Sophie Strong	Essendon	5 November 2026	Delisted	
Sarah Hosking	Richmond	5 November 2026	Delisted	
Paige Scott	Richmond	6 November 2026	Delisted	
Rene Caris	St Kilda	6 November 2026	Delisted	
Darcy Guttridge	St Kilda	6 November 2026	Delisted	
Hannah Ewings	Adelaide	6 November 2026	Delisted	
Georgia McKee	Adelaide	6 November 2026	Delisted	
Kiera Mueller	Adelaide	6 November 2026	Delisted	
Brooke Smith	Adelaide	6 November 2026	Delisted	
Georgia Clayden	Gold Coast	10 November 2026	Delisted	
Sienna McMullen	Gold Coast	10 November 2026	Delisted	
Kate Surman	Geelong	14 November 2026	Retired	
