= 2024 Essendon Football Club season =

Essendon Football Club season

The 2024 Essendon Football Club season was the club's 128th season playing in the Australian Football League (AFL). The club also fielded an AFLW side that competed in the AFLW's 9th Season. Essendon also fielded reserve teams for the AFL and AFLW in the Victorian Football League (VFL) and the VFLW. This was the club's 15th season in the VFL.

== AFL ==
Essendon Football Club
2024 AFL season
- President: Dave Barham
- Coach: Brad Scott (2nd season)
- Captains: Zach Merrett (3rd season)
- Home ground: MCG, Marvel Stadium
- Practice Match: Won by 5, Lost by 35
- Home & Away: 11 wins, 11 losses, 1 draw (11th)
- Finals: DNQ
- Best and Fairest: Zach Merrett
- Leading goalkicker: Kyle Langford (43)
- Highest home attendance: 93,644 vs. Collingwood (Round 8)
- Lowest home attendance: 36,283 vs. St Kilda (Round 3)
- Average home attendance: 61,421
- Club membership: 83,664

=== Season summary ===
The 2024 season was Essendon's second season coached by Brad Scott. Zach Merrett continued as the sole captain for his third season in the role. The Bombers showed improvement from the previous year, remaining competitive for a finals spot for the majority of the season.

Essendon started the season strongly, spending significant time inside the top eight and looking poised for a finals appearance. However, a severe late-season slump, where they dropped crucial, winnable games against lower-ranked opponents, saw them miss out on finals action entirely (DNQ). They finished the home-and-away season in 11th position, recording 11 wins, 11 losses, and 1 draw. The disappointing finish mirrored patterns from previous seasons, intensifying scrutiny on the club's consistency.

Notable highlights of the season included Zach Merrett winning his fifth Crichton Medal, drawing level with James Hird for the third-most wins in club history. Kyle Langford was the club's leading goalkicker for the second consecutive year, finishing with 43 goals. The club also saw strong development from younger players, with Nate Caddy winning the club's Rising Star award and Sam Durham being named Most Improved.

=== Pre-season ===
Essendon played a match simulation against St Kilda on 23 February 2024, at RSEA Park, which they lost 5.10 (40) to 16.10 (106). The Bombers concluded their pre-season with an official AFL Community Series game against Geelong at GMHBA Stadium on 1 March 2024, losing a close contest 10.11 (71) to 11.17 (83). Essendon's first game in the home-and-away season was against Hawthorn at the MCG.

=== Coaching staff ===
Brad Scott coached his second season for the Bombers after a three-year break from coaching after stepping down from as senior coach of North Melbourne in 2019.

2024 Essendon coaching staff
Role	Name
Senior Coach	Brad Scott
Assistant Coach (backline)	Blake Caracella
Assistant Coach (midfield)	Daniel Giansiracusa
Assistant Coach (forward)	Dale Tapping
Assistant Midfield Coach	Ben Jacobs
Specialist Coach	Travis Cloke

=== Arrivals ===
Player	Previous Club	League	via
Ben McKay	North Melbourne	AFL	Free Agency
Todd Goldstein	North Melbourne	AFL	Free Agency
Jade Gresham	St Kilda	AFL	Free Agency
Xavier Duursma	Port Adelaide	AFL	Trade
Nate Caddy	Northern Knights	Coates Talent League	AFL Draft, Pick 10
Luamon Lual	Greater Western Victoria Rebels	Coates Talent League	AFL Draft, Pick 39
Archie Roberts	Sandringham Dragons	Coates Talent League	AFL Draft, Pick 54
Vigo Visentini	Sandringham Dragons	Coates Talent League	Rookie Draft, Pick 8

=== Departures ===
Player	New Club	League	via
Brandon Zerk-Thatcher	Port Adelaide	AFL	Trade
Massimo D'Ambrosio	Hawthorn	AFL	Trade
Anthony McDonald-Tipungwuti	-	-	Retired
Andrew Phillips	-	-	Retired
Will Snelling	-	-	Delisted
Patrick Voss	Fremantle	AFL	Delisted
Cian McBride	-	-	Delisted
Alastair Lord	-	-	Delisted
Rhett Montgomerie	-	-	Delisted
Anthony Munkara	-	-	Delisted

Essendon 2024 AFL Playing list and statistics
Player	No.	2024 AFL Statistics								
Player	No.	Games	Goals	Behinds	Kicks	Handballs	Disposals	Marks	Tackles	Hitouts
Nic Martin	37	23	15	11	418	232	650	153	54	
Zach Merrett	7	23	14	15	361	287	648	99	114	
Andrew McGrath	1	23	1		311	214	525	108	62	
Jye Caldwell	6	23	8	9	253	270	523	95	149	
Sam Durham	22	22	10	5	235	235	470	88	97	
Mason Redman	27	21	2	4	339	104	443	127	35	
Dyson Heppell	21	18	1		195	188	383	102	29	
Jayden Laverde	15	21			194	139	333	127	33	
Jade Gresham	11	22	19	12	158	149	307	56	47	
Jake Kelly	29	20	1		194	111	305	115	26	
Ben McKay	32	23			162	141	303	122	32	4
Darcy Parish	3	12	2	4	146	149	295	55	52	
Jake Stringer	25	23	42	25	203	88	291	89	58	
Kyle Langford	4	23	43	27	193	96	289	119	59	4
Xavier Duursma	28	15	9		165	113	278	96	40	
Archie Perkins	16	18	5	7	165	111	276	56	67	
Nik Cox	13	20	8	3	127	114	241	70	50	11
Harry Jones	23	21	18	11	145	83	228	103	32	
Jordan Ridley	14	9	1		144	51	195	73	10	
Dylan Shiel	9	9	2		94	95	189	34	31	
Sam Draper	2	16	11	10	122	57	179	49	31	306
Nick Hind	19	15	6	4	130	44	174	37	29	
Peter Wright	20	14	19	7	91	67	158	60	19	119
Matt Guelfi	35	13	15	10	75	80	155	32	46	
Ben Hobbs	8	12	2	2	77	73	150	25	35	
Todd Goldstein	17	14	2	1	44	99	143	25	26	344
Jye Menzie	47	14	3	5	71	55	126	38	21	
Nate Caddy	30	10	9	11	72	37	109	40	14	
Will Setterfield	12	4		2	49	42	91	17	27	
Archie Roberts	38	4	1		47	40	87	21	12	
Elijah Tsatas	5	7	1	1	34	37	71	18	5	
Nick Bryan	24	5			34	27	61	11	15	103
Alwyn Davey	33	10	5	1	38	22	60	10	16	
Sam Weideman	10	1			4	5	9	2		
Zach Reid	31	1			1	2	3	2	1	

== VFL ==
=== Season summary ===
Essendon Football Club
2024 VFL season
- President: Dave Barham
- Coach: Blake Caracella (1st season)
- Captains: Xavier O'Neill (1st season)
- Home ground: The NEC Hangar, Windy Hill
- Home & Away: 9 wins, 9 losses (11th)
- Finals: DNQ
- Leading goalkicker: Nate Caddy (32)

Blake Caracella was appointed as the senior VFL coach of Essendon before the start of the 2024 VFL season. This was Xavier O'Neill's first season as captain of the VFL Bombers.

The Bombers finished 11th on the VFL ladder with a 9–9 record. After a difficult first half of the season, the team experienced a strong finish, winning six of their final seven games. Despite this late surge, they narrowly missed out on the wildcard finals spots. The Bombers concluded their 2024 campaign with a 38-point victory over Coburg (16.15 (111) to 11.7 (73)) at Piranha Park on 18 August 2024.

=== Results ===
Table of 2024 VFL season results
Round	Opponent	Score	Margin	Venue
1	Brisbane Lions VFL	8.7 (55) – 14.8 (92)	37	NEC Hangar
2	Sandringham	12.11 (83) – 13.9 (87)	4	Trevor Barker Beach Oval
3	Western Bulldogs VFL	12.7 (79) – 11.14 (80)	1	Mission Whitten Oval
4	Bye			
5	Southport	7.11 (53) – 19.10 (124)	71	NEC Hangar
6	Box Hill	7.13 (55) – 17.15 (117)	62	Box Hill City Oval
7	Sydney Swans VFL	13.12 (90) – 15.6 (96)	6	Tramway Oval
8	North Melbourne VFL	10.6 (66) – 11.7 (73)	7	Arden Street Oval
9	Richmond VFL	13.14 (92) – 11.14 (80)	12	MCG
10	Carlton VFL	12.12 (84) – 17.11 (113)	29	Ikon Park
11	Bye			
12	Gold Coast Suns VFL	10.9 (69) – 18.15 (123)	54	NEC Hangar
13	Collingwood VFL	15.10 (100) – 13.8 (86)	14	Windy Hill
14	Geelong VFL	12.11 (83) – 8.11 (59)	24	GMHBA Stadium
15	Port Melbourne	12.7 (79) – 11.11 (77)	2	Windy Hill
16	Frankston	11.11 (77) – 15.11 (101)	24	Kinetic Stadium
17	Northern Bullants	14.18 (102) – 4.7 (31)	71	Genis Steel Oval
18	Sandringham	13.14 (92) – 11.16 (82)	10	Windy Hill
19	Gold Coast Suns VFL	15.12 (102) – 9.16 (70)	32	People First Stadium
20	Bye			
21	Coburg	16.15 (111) – 11.7 (73)	38	Piranha Park

=== Ladder ===
2024 VFL Ladder
Pos	Team	Pld	W	L	D	PF	PA	Pct	Pts
1	Werribee	18	15	3	0	1504	1067	141.0	60
2	Footscray (R)	18	14	3	1	1654	1312	126.1	58
3	Brisbane (R)	18	13	5	0	1754	1467	119.6	52
4	Geelong (R)	18	12	5	1	1537	1242	123.8	50
5	Southport	18	12	6	0	1515	1257	120.5	48
6	Box Hill (R)	18	12	6	0	1465	1278	114.6	48
7	Gold Coast (R)	18	10	6	2	1652	1385	119.3	44
8	Williamstown	18	11	7	0	1404	1363	103.0	44
9	Richmond (R)	18	10	8	0	1423	1342	106.0	40
10	Frankston	18	10	8	0	1283	1304	98.4	40
11	Essendon (R)	18	9	9	0	1518	1586	95.7	36
12	Sandringham	18	8	9	1	1461	1401	104.3	34
13	Sydney (R)	18	8	9	1	1350	1322	102.1	34
14	Greater Western Sydney (R)	18	8	10	0	1439	1582	91.0	32
15	North Melbourne (R)	18	8	10	0	1310	1490	87.9	32
16	Port Melbourne	18	6	12	0	1402	1511	92.8	24
17	Casey (R)	18	5	13	0	1358	1621	83.8	20
18	Coburg	18	5	13	0	1216	1548	78.6	20
19	Carlton (R)	18	4	14	0	1492	1657	90.0	16
20	Collingwood (R)	18	4	14	0	1252	1645	76.1	16
21	Northern Bullants	18	2	16	0	1026	1635	62.8	8

=== Coaching staff ===
Role	Name
VFL Senior Coach	Blake Caracella
Development Coach	Cam Roberts
Development Coach	Brent Stanton
Development Coach	Michael Hurley

== AFLW ==
=== Arrivals ===
Player	Previous Club	League	via
Courtney Murphy	Greater Western Sydney	AFLW	Trade
Grace Belloni	Eastern Ranges	Coates Talent League	AFLW Draft, Pick 8
Holly Ridewood	Northern Knights	Coates Talent League	AFLW Draft, Pick 12
Taya Chambers	East Fremantle	WAFLW	AFLW Draft, Pick 30
Sophie Strong	-	-	AFLW Draft

=== Departures ===
Player	New Club	League	via
Amber Clarke	St Kilda	AFLW	Trade
Ashanti Van Loon	Sydney	AFLW	Trade
Catherine Phillips	-	-	Retired
Lily-Rose Williamson	-	-	Delisted
Kodi Jacques	-	-	Delisted
Jacqui Vogt	-	-	Delisted

=== Playing List ===
Essendon 2024 AFLW Playing List and Statistics
Player	No.	AFLW Stats	
Player	No.	Games	Goals
Emily Gough	1	4	0
Georgia Gee	2	11	1
Daria Bannister	3	10	3
Madison Prespakis	4	11	1
Georgia Nanscawen	5	12	2
Maddison Gay	6	2	0
Grace Belloni	7	8	5
Bonnie Toogood	8	10	1
Brooke Walker	9	4	2
Holly Ridewood	10	12	1
Brooke Sheridan	11	1	0
Elizabeth Keaney	12	5	0
Taya Chambers	13	10	0
Ellyse Gamble	14	12	0
Chloe Adams	15	12	0
Matilda Dyke	16	12	1
Georgia Clarke	17	12	1
Sophie Strong	18	5	1
Mia Van Dyke	19	2	1
Stephanie Cain	20	12	0
Maggie MacLachlan	21	11	0
Amelia Radford	22	11	0
Amy Gaylor	23	12	0
Sophie Alexander	24	12	4
Alexandra Morcom	25	12	0
Amelie Gladman	26	3	0
Sophie Van de Heuvel	27	12	0
Mia Busch	28	7	0
Jess Verbrugge	29	2	0
Stephanie Wales	30	12	4
Grace Brooker	32	0	0
Courtney Murphy	33	1	0
Brooke Brown	36	12	0

Table of 2024 AFLW season results
Round	Date	Result	Score			Opponent	Score			Ground		Attendance	Ladder
Round	Date	Result	G	B	T	Opponent	G	B	T	Ground		Attendance	Ladder
1	2 September 2024	Won	7	7	49	Hawthorn	4	6	30	Kinetic Stadium	A	3,778	5th
2	10 September 2024	Won	6	4	40	St Kilda	4	4	28	Windy Hill	H	3,195	5th
3	16 September	Lost	5	4	34	Adelaide	12	9	81	Wigan Oval	A	2,238	10th
4	24 September	Won	7	8	50	Fremantle	4	6	30	Windy Hill	H	2,822	7th
5	30 September	Lost	3	6	24	Collingwood	6	8	44	AIA Centre	A	1,422	9th
6	8 October	Won	4	5	29	Geelong	2	7	19	Reid Oval	H	2,832	7th
7	14 October	Won	8	5	53	Richmond	5	6	36	IKON Park	A	2,847	5th
8	22 October	Lost	2	7	19	West Coast	3	5	23	Windy Hill	H	2,108	5th
9	28 October	Won	8	8	56	Carlton	3	6	24	Windy Hill	H	3,812	5th
10	3 November	Lost	3	7	25	Gold Coast	6	3	39	Great Barrier Reef Arena	A	2,131	7th

Table of 2024 AFLW finals results
Round	Date	Result	Score			Opponent	Score			Ground		Attendance
Round	Date	Result	G	B	T	Opponent	G	B	T	Ground		Attendance
Elimination Final	12 November	Lost	5	3	33	Geelong	7	9	51	GMHBA Stadium	A	6,678

Pos	Team	Pld	W	L	D	PF	PA	PP	Pts	Qualification
1	North Melbourne (P)	11	10	0	1	656	208	315.4	42	Finals series
2	Hawthorn	11	10	1	0	597	309	193.2	40	Finals series
3	Brisbane	11	9	2	0	611	335	182.4	36	Finals series
4	Adelaide	11	8	3	0	494	285	173.3	32	Finals series
5	Fremantle	11	8	3	0	404	297	136.0	32	Finals series
6	Port Adelaide	11	7	4	0	431	364	118.4	28	Finals series
7	Richmond	11	6	4	1	442	337	131.2	26	Finals series
8	Essendon	11	6	4	1	376	359	104.7	26	Finals series
9	Melbourne	11	6	5	0	369	420	87.9	24	
10	Geelong	11	4	6	1	479	437	109.6	18	
11	St Kilda	11	4	7	0	379	396	95.7	16	
12	Western Bulldogs	11	4	7	0	291	461	63.1	16	
13	West Coast	11	4	7	0	320	509	62.9	16	
14	Carlton	11	4	7	0	266	532	50.0	16	
15	Sydney	11	3	8	0	395	538	73.4	12	
16	Greater Western Sydney	11	1	9	1	374	531	70.4	6	
17	Gold Coast	11	1	9	1	311	569	54.7	6	
18	Collingwood	11	1	10	0	245	553	44.3	4	

Source: afl.com.au
Rules for classification: 1) points; 2) percentage; 3) number of points for
(P) Premiers

== VFLW ==
Essendon Football Club
2024 VFLW season
- President: Dave Barham
- Coach: Travis Cloke (2nd season)
- Captains: El Chaston (1st season)
- Home ground: The NEC Hangar
- Home & Away: 7 wins, 6 losses, 1 draw (6th)
- Finals: Elimination Final
- Best and Fairest: El Chaston
- Leading goalkicker: Mia Rae-Clifford

=== Season summary ===
Travis Cloke was appointed senior coach of Essendon's VFLW side for the 2024 season. El Chaston captained the Bombers VFLW side. Essendon competed in their seventh VFLW season, finishing in 6th place and reaching the finals for the fourth consecutive year, where they were eliminated by North Melbourne.

The Bombers started their seventh VFLW season with a draw against Box Hill. Essendon kicked four goals to Box Hill's three goals. The Bombers then lost their next two games against the Southern Saints and Carlton. Essendon then won their next five games from rounds four to eight.

In the last round of the season Essendon needed a win to make the finals. The Bombers defeated the Western Bulldogs in the last round to make the finals. The final score was 6.5 (41) to 4.4 (28).

In the first round of finals the Bombers defeated Box Hill by 10 points. Their 10-point win against the Hawks put them into the semi-finals against Collingwood which they lost to by four points. The Bombers' loss to Collingwood put them into the Preliminary Final against Port Melbourne. Essendon lost by five goals against the Boroughs eliminating them from the 2024 VFLW season.

=== Coaching staff ===
Retired Collingwood and Western Bulldogs player Travis Cloke was appointed senior coach of the Bombers VFLW team. Cloke coached with four other coaches including former AFLW player Kirby Bentley.

2024 VFLW coaching staff
Role	Name
Senior Coach	Travis Cloke
Assistant Coach (midfield)	Brett Pollard
Assistant Coach (defensive)	Jacara Egan
Assistant Coach (forward)	Kirby Bentley
Development Coach	Jarrad Campbell

=== Results ===
==== Home & Away ====
Key
H	Home game
A	Away game

Table of 2024 VFLW season results
Round	Date	Results	Score			Opponent	Score			Ground		Ladder
Round	Date	Results	G	B	T	Opponent	G	B	T	Ground		Ladder
1	26 March 2024	Draw	4	3	27	Box Hill	3	9	27	The NEC Hangar	H	7th
2	2 April	Lost	2	5	17	Southern Saints	6	6	42	Trevor Barker Beach Oval	A	9th
3	8 April	Lost	2	2	14	Carlton	10	8	68	The NEC Hangar	H	10th
4	16 April	Won	4	13	37	Casey	5	5	35	The NEC Hangar	H	9th
5	22 April	Won	4	7	31	Collingwood	2	3	15	Victoria Park	A	8th
6	30 April	Won	4	6	30	Williamstown	3	3	21	DSV Stadium	A	6th
7	7 May	Won	2	8	20	Southern Saints	1	2	8	The NEC Hangar	H	5th
8	13 May	Won	5	3	33	Box Hill	1	9	15	Box Hill City Oval	A	3rd
9	20 May	Lost	4	2	26	Geelong	4	4	28	The NEC Hangar	H	5th
10	28 May	Won	6	6	42	Darebin	1	2	8	La Trobe University	A	4th
11	4 June	Lost	5	7	37	North Melbourne	6	9	45	The NEC Hangar	H	6th
12	17 June	Won	4	6	30	Casey	3	7	25	Casey Fields	A	4th
13	25 June	Lost	3	1	19	Port Melbourne	3	4	22	ETU Stadium	A	7th
14	1 July	Won	6	5	41	Western Bulldogs	4	4	28	Windy Hill	H	5th
Elimination Final	8 July	Won	4	7	31	Box Hill	3	3	21	Box Hill City Oval	A	-
Semi Final	15 July	Lost	2	6	18	Collingwood	3	4	22	Victoria Park	A	-
Preliminary Final	23 July	Lost	1	5	11	Port Melbourne	6	5	41	ETU Stadium	H	-

==== Ladder ====
Pos	Team	Pld	W	L	D	PF	PA	PP	Pts	Qualification
3	Box Hill	14	8	5	1	734	390	188.2	34	Finals series
4	North Melbourne (P)	14	8	6	0	519	555	93.5	32	Finals series
5	Essendon	14	7	6	1	446	482	92.5	30	Finals series
6	Port Melbourne	14	6	7	1	458	403	113.6	26	Finals series
7	Collingwood	14	6	8	0	341	375	90.9	24	

Source: AFL.com.au
Rules for classification: 1) points; 2) percentage; 3) number of points for.
(P) Premiers

==== Awards ====
- Best and Fairest: El Chaston
- 2nd Best and Fairest: Ruby Mahony
- 3rd Best and Fairest: Ashlea Melnikas
- Most Valuable Young Player: Maddison Ford
- Don of the Year: Christina Bernardi
- Best Club Person: Sarah Ford
- Leading Goal Kicker: Mia Rae-Clifford (14 Goals)
