= Gold Coast Suns Club Champion (AFL Women's) =

- Awarded for: The best and fairest player of the Gold Coast Suns in the AFL Women's
- Country: Australia
- Presented by: Gold Coast Suns
- First award: 2020
- Currently held by: Charlie Rowbottom

In the AFL Women's (AFLW), the Gold Coast Suns Club Champion award is awarded to the best and fairest player at the Gold Coast Suns during the home-and-away season. The award has been awarded annually since the club's inaugural season in the competition in 2020, and Jamie Stanton was the inaugural winner of the award.

== Recipients ==
**Bold**	Denotes current player
	Player won AFL Women's best and fairest in same season

Season	Recipient(s)	Ref.
2020	Jamie Stanton	
2021	Lauren Ahrens	
2022 (S6)	Alison Drennan	
2022 (S7)	**Charlie Rowbottom**	
2023	Claudia Whitfort	
2024	**Charlie Rowbottom** (2)	
2025	**Charlie Rowbottom** (3)	
2026	**Charlie Rowbottom** (4)	

=== Multiple winners ===
Player	Awards	Seasons
**Charlie Rowbottom**	4	2022 (S7), 2024, 2025, 2026

== See also ==
- Gold Coast Suns Club Champion (list of Gold Coast Suns best and fairest winners in the Australian Football League)
