= Lily Tarlinton =

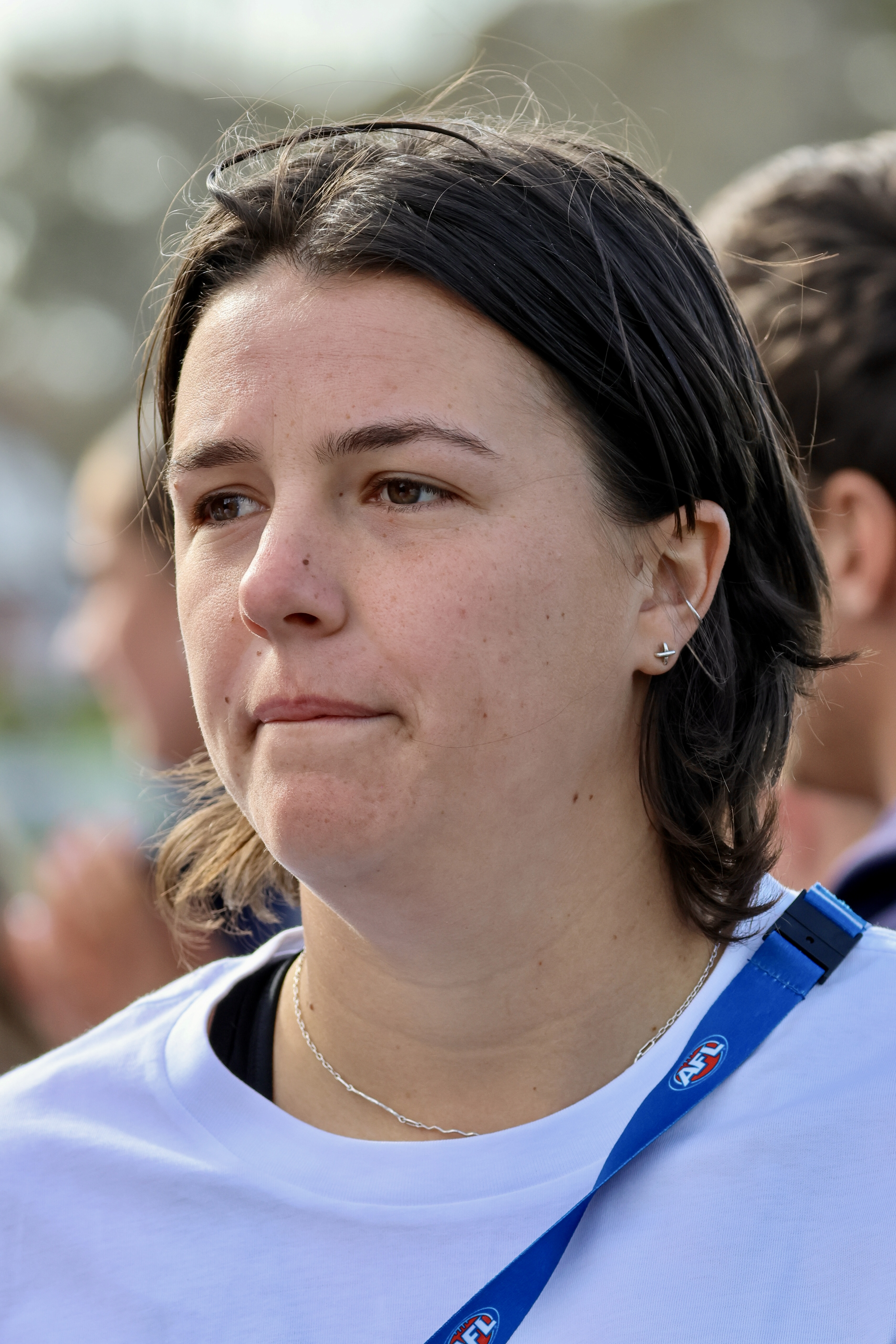
- Tarlinton in August 2026

Personal information
- Nickname: Tarls
- Born: 22 January 2002 (age 24)
- Original team: Bond University (QAFLW)
- Draft: No. 34, 2023 AFL Women's draft#2023 draft
- Debut: Round 7, 2024, Adelaide vs. Melbourne, at Norwood Oval
- Height: 180 cm (5 ft 11 in)
- Position: Tall forward / Ruck

Club information
- Current club: Adelaide
- Number: 4

Playing career^{1}
| Years | Club | Games (Goals) |
| 2024– | Adelaide | 8 (0) |
- ^{1} Playing statistics correct to the end of 2025 season.

Lily Tarlinton (born 22 January 2002) is an Australian rules footballer who plays for the Adelaide Football Club in the AFL Women's (AFLW).

== AFLW career ==
Adelaide drafted Tarlinton with the 34th overall pick in the 2023 draft. She made her debut in round 7, 2024.
