= Ally Dallaway =

Personal information
- Born: 22 January 1999 (age 27); Castle Hill, New South Wales
- Original team: East Coast Eagles (AFL Sydney)
- Draft: 2022 pre-season draft
- Debut: Round 1, 2022 ^{(S6)}, Greater Western Sydney vs. Gold Coast, at Great Barrier Reef Arena
- Height: 164 cm (5 ft 5 in)
- Position: Midfielder

Club information
- Current club: Richmond
- Number: 30

Playing career^{1}
Years	Club	Games (Goals)
2022 ^{(S6)}–2023	Greater Western Sydney	30 (0)
2024–	Richmond	23 (1)
Total		53 (1)
- ^{1} Playing statistics correct to the end of 2025.

Ally Dallaway (born 2 January 1999) is a professional Australian rules football player who currently plays for the Richmond Tigers in the AFL Women's (AFLW). She originally played for Greater Western Sydney from 2022 to 2023.

== Early Life ==
Dallaway first played senior Australian rules for the East Coast Eagles, where she was captain, before joining the Greater Western Sydney Academy.

== AFL Women's career ==
=== Greater Western Sydney ===
After missing out on previous drafts, Dallaway made her way onto the Greater Western Sydney playing list through a pre-season signing. She made her debut in round one of season six against Gold Coast.

=== Richmond ===
Dallaway joined Richmond following the 2023 AFL Women's season along with Giants teammate Jodie Hicks.

She played her 50th career game in October 2025.
