= Kaylee Kimber =

Australian rules football player (born 2003)

Personal information
- Full name: Kaylee Kimber
- Born: 13 September 2003 (age 23)
- Original team: Southport (QAFLW)
- Height: 174 cm (5 ft 9 in)
- Position: Defender

Club information
- Current club: Western Bulldogs
- Number: 28

Playing career^{1}
Years	Club	Games (Goals)
S7 (2022)–2023	Gold Coast	3 (1)
2024–	Western Bulldogs	8 (1)
- ^{1} Playing statistics correct to the end of the 2024 season.

Kaylee Kimber (born 13 September 2003) is an Australian rules footballer playing for the Western Bulldogs in the AFL Women's (AFLW).

== Early life ==
Kimber grew up in Moranbah, Queensland, located 200km south-west of Mackay. A netballer in her younger years, she switched to Australian rules football for the first time at 16 years of age with the Moranbah Bulldogs in the local AFL Mackay competition before relocating to the Gold Coast in early 2022 to play for the Southport Sharks in the top state level QAFLW competition. Kimber was added to the Gold Coast Suns list in August 2022 as an injury replacement for fellow Mackay-Isaac region product Alana Gee.

== AFL Women's career ==
Kimber made her AFLW debut for the Gold Coast Suns at 18 years of age in round 8 of season seven. She kicked her first goal in the AFLW in the following round.

Kimber was delisted by Gold Coast after not playing a game in the 2023 season. However, in 2024 she was recruited by Western Bulldogs as an injury replacement player for Vaomua Laloifi, two days after winning the QALFW premiership with Southport.
