= Gabby Newton =

Female Australian rules footballer

Personal information
- Full name: Gabrielle Newton
- Born: 31 August 2001 (age 25)
- Original team: Northern Knights (NAB League)
- Draft: No. 1, 2019 national draft
- Debut: Round 1, 2020, Western Bulldogs vs. St Kilda, at RSEA Park
- Height: 175 cm (5 ft 9 in)
- Position: Utility

Club information
- Current club: Fremantle
- Number: 1

Playing career^{1}
Years	Club	Games (Goals)
2020–2023	Western Bulldogs	36 (10)
2024–	Fremantle	37 (3)
Total		73 (13)
- ^{1} Playing statistics correct to the end of the 2026 season.

Career highlights
- AFL Women's All-Australian team: 2025; 2× 22under22 team: 2020, 2023; AFL Women's Rising Star nominee: 2020; Western Bulldogs leading goalkicker: 2022 (S7)

Gabrielle "Gabby" Newton (born 31 August 2001) is an Australian rules footballer who plays for Fremantle, after previously playing for Western Bulldogs in the AFL Women's (AFLW).

Newton was named in the team's best 4 times in the 6 games she played in the 2020 AFL Women's season, with her collecting career high amounts of disposals in rounds 4 and 6. She received 1 best and fairest vote for her performance in round 4 of the 2020 season, as well as the weekly Rising Star nominee. Newton signed a contract extension with the club on 16 June 2021, after playing every game possible for the club that season.

At the end of the 2023 season Newton requested a trade to Fremantle. This was completed as part of a giant 11 team trade in the 2023 trade period.

Newton's first season at the Dockers saw her finish third in the Club fairest and best award. Newton's tackling and pressure were important in Fremantle's 2024 campaign; a highlight was her career-best 20-tackle effort in the elimination final win over Essendon—just two tackles shy of the all-time record—helping bring her total count for the year to 99, more than double her next-best return in a season.

During the 2025 pre-season, Newton was promoted to Fremantle's leadership group. She finished the season second place in Fremantle's fairest and best award on 215 votes and also earnt a maiden AFL Women's All-Australian team selection. Across her 12 games in 2025, she averaged 24.4 disposals per game, resulting in the ninth highest disposal count in the league. In June 2026, Newton was appointed vice-captain of Fremantle.

== Statistics ==
Statistics are correct to the end of 2025.

Legend
G	Goals	K	Kicks	D	Disposals	T	Tackles
B	Behinds	H	Handballs	M	Marks

Season	Team	No.	Games	Totals							Averages (per game)							Votes
Season	Team	No.	Games	G	B	K	H	D	M	T	G	B	K	H	D	M	T	Votes
2020	Western Bulldogs	5	6	0	0	37	42	79	10	42	0.0	0.0	6.2	7.0	13.2	1.7	7.0	1
2021	Western Bulldogs	5	9	0	0	45	34	79	17	34	0.0	0.0	5.0	3.8	8.8	1.9	3.8	0
2022 (S6)	Western Bulldogs	5	0	0	0	0	0	0	0	0	0.0	0.0	0.0	0.0	0.0	0.0	0.0	0
2022 (S7)	Western Bulldogs	5	11	8	2	46	37	83	22	33	0.7	0.2	4.2	3.4	7.5	2.0	3.0	0
2023	Western Bulldogs	5	10	2	0	100	51	151	41	32	0.2	0.0	10.0	5.1	15.1	4.1	3.2	0
2024	Fremantle	1	13	0	1	141	90	231	29	99	0.0	0.1	10.8	6.9	17.8	2.2	7.6	1
2025	Fremantle	1	12	2	1	146	147	293	39	88	0.0	0.0	12.2	12.3	24.4	2.9	7.3	3
Career			61	12	4	515	401	916	154	328	0.2	0.1	8.4	6.6	15.0	2.5	5.4	5
