= Lauren Ahrens =

Australian rules footballer (born 1991)

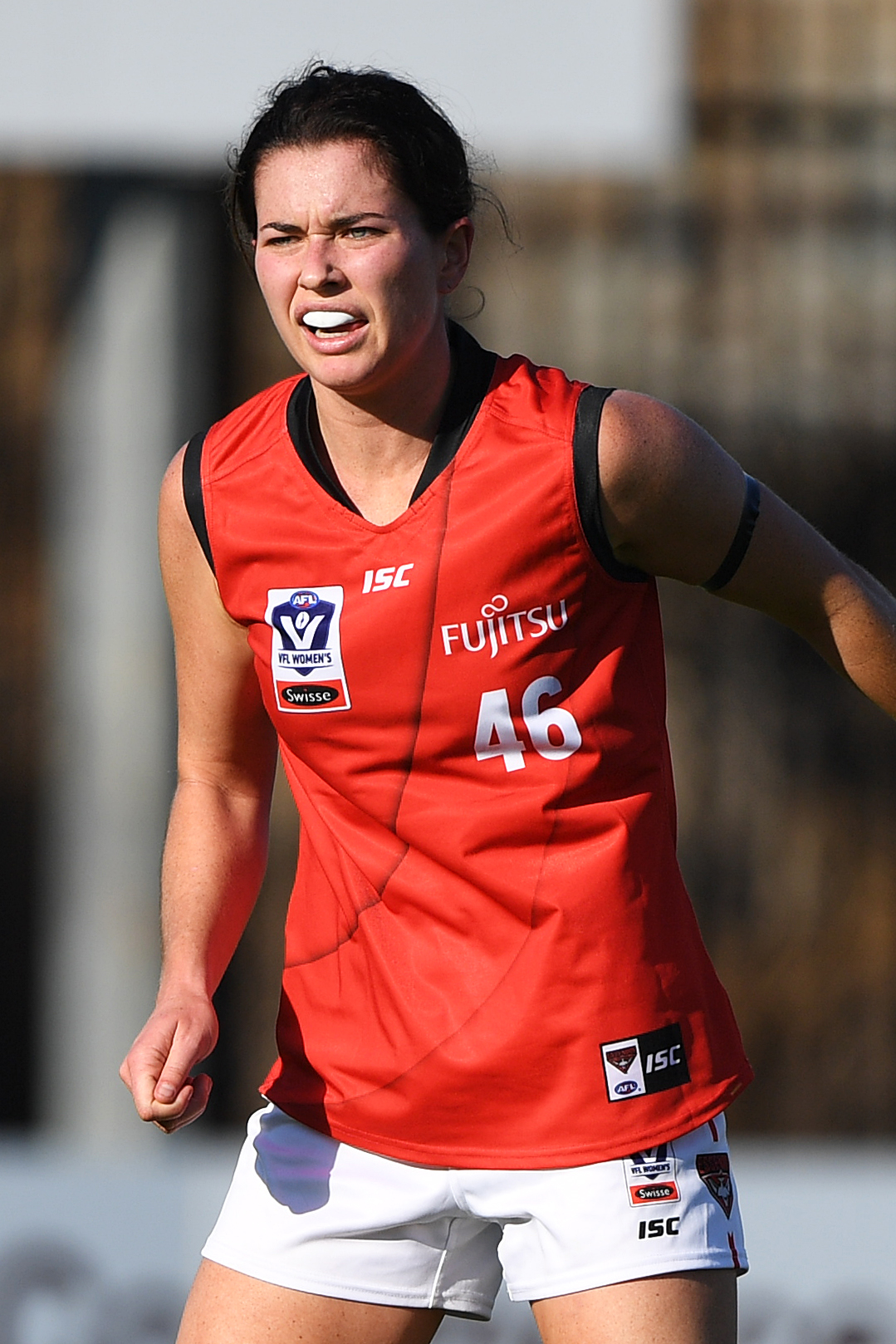
- Ahrens playing for Essendon's VFLW team in June 2019

Personal information
- Born: 19 August 1991 (age 35); Gold Coast, Queensland
- Original team: Essendon (VFLW)
- Debut: Round 1, 2020, Gold Coast vs. Greater Western Sydney, at Blacktown ISP Oval
- Height: 182 cm (6 ft 0 in)
- Position: Defender

Club information
- Current club: Western Bulldogs

Playing career^{1}
Years	Club	Games (Goals)
2020–2023	Gold Coast	47 (1)
2024–	Western Bulldogs	0 (0)
Total		47 (1)
- ^{1} Playing statistics correct to the end of the 2023 season.

Career highlights
- Gold Coast Club Champion: 2021

Lauren Ahrens (born 19 August 1991) is an Australian rules footballer playing for the Western Bulldogs in the AFL Women's (AFLW). She has previously played for the Gold Coast.

== Early life ==
Ahrens was born on the Gold Coast and attended Kingscliff High School and moved to Palm Beach Currumbin State High School for their Touch football program. Upon graduation, she relocated to Victoria and began studying Health Science at Melbourne University. She began playing Australian rules football for the first time with the Melbourne University Mugars team. She also had stints with VFLW teams St Kilda and Essendon.

== AFLW career ==
Ahrens was pre-listed by her hometown team, the Gold Coast Suns, in the lead up to the 2019 AFL Women's draft. She made her debut against Greater Western Sydney at Blacktown ISP Oval in the opening round of the 2020 season. Aherns has played almost every game at the Suns, and in the 2021 season she became the club's most consistent player and was recognised as the team's best and fairest player after collecting 238 best and fairest votes, only 5 ahead of second-placed Alison Drennan. Ahrens achieved selection in Champion Data's 2021 AFLW All-Star stats team, after leading the league for average metres gained in the 2021 AFL Women's season, totalling 321.1 a game.

Ahead of the 2024 AFL Women's season, Ahrens was traded to the Western Bulldogs as part of an 11-player trade.

== Statistics ==
Statistics are correct to the end of the 2021 season.

Legend
G	Goals	K	Kicks	D	Disposals	T	Tackles
B	Behinds	H	Handballs	M	Marks

Season	Team	No.	Games	Totals							Averages (per game)							Votes
Season	Team	No.	Games	G	B	K	H	D	M	T	G	B	K	H	D	M	T	Votes
2020	Gold Coast	7	7	1	1	56	46	102	17	20	0.1	0.1	8.0	6.6	14.6	2.4	2.9	
2021	Gold Coast	7	9	0	0	100	50	150	43	21	0.0	0.0	11.1	5.5	16.6	4.7	2.3	
Career			16	1	1	156	96	252	60	41	0.1	0.1	9.8	6.1	15.8	3.8	2.6	
