= Charlotte Wilson (footballer) =

Australian rules footballer

- Wilson in November 2026

Personal information
- Born: 29 December 2000 (age 25)
- Original team: Eastern Ranges (TAC Cup)
- Draft: No. 27, 2018 AFLW draft
- Debut: Round 5, 2019, Carlton vs. Collingwood, at Ikon Park
- Height: 177 cm (5 ft 10 in)
- Position: Defender

Club information
- Current club: Gold Coast

Playing career^{1}
Years	Club	Games (Goals)
2019–2022 (S6)	Carlton	22 (0)
2022 (S7)–2023	Melbourne	8 (0)
2024–	Gold Coast	0 (0)
Total		30 (0)
- ^{1} Playing statistics correct to the end of the 2023 season.

Charlotte Rose Wilson (born 29 December 2000) is an Australian rules footballer playing for the Gold Coast Suns in the AFL Women's (AFLW). She was drafted by Carlton with the 27th pick overall in the 2018 AFLW draft. Wilson made her AFLW debut in round 5 of the 2019 season.

In June 2022, Wilson was traded to Melbourne.

Ahead of the 2024 AFL Women's season, Wilson was traded to the Gold Coast along with Katie Lynch as part of an 11-club deal.

Wilson currently studies a Bachelor of Exercise and Sport Science at Deakin University.
