= Mikayla Pauga =

AFLW player

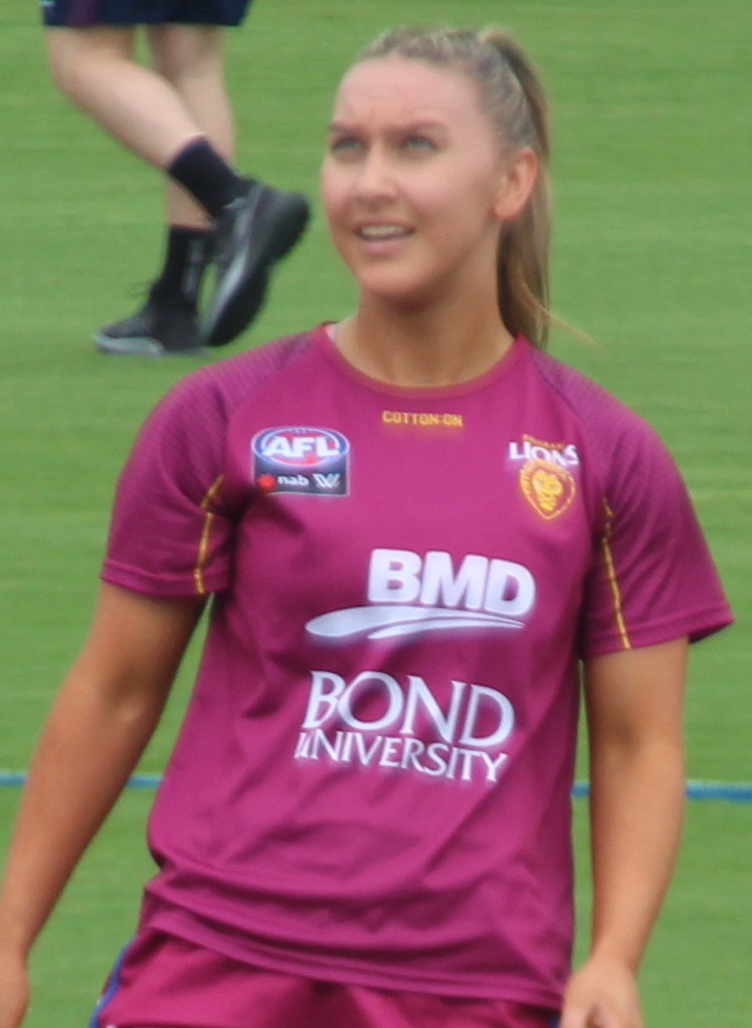
- Pauga warming up before the 2022 season 7 Grand Final

Personal information
- Born: 10 April 2003 (age 23); Brisbane
- Original team: Bond University (QAFLW)
- Draft: 46 (2021 AFL Women's draft)
- Debut: 24 September 2022, Brisbane vs. Richmond, at Punt Road Oval
- Height: 161 cm (5 ft 3 in)
- Position: Half Forward

Club information
- Current club: Greater Western Sydney

Playing career^{1}
Years	Club	Games (Goals)
2022 (S6)–2023	Brisbane	15 (0)
2024–	Greater Western Sydney	0 (0)
Total		15 (0)
- ^{1} Playing statistics correct to the end of the 2023 season.

Career highlights
- AFLW premiership player: 2023

Mikayla Pauga (born 10 April 2003) is an Australian rules footballer who plays for Greater Western Sydney in the AFL Women's (AFLW). She previously played for Brisbane, with whom she won a premiership in 2023.

== Early life and junior football ==
Pauga was raised between the suburbs of Morayfield and Caboolture, northern suburbs of Brisbane. Initially a netballer, Pauga began playing with Narangba Valley State High School's AFL Academy encouraged by teacher and Maroochydore player. Pauga played junior football with the local Narangba JAFC and senior football on the Sunshine Coast with the Maroochydore Football Club. Pauga moved to the Gold Coast and playing with Bond University in the QAFLW and awarded the Riewoldt Family AFL Excellence Scholarship as part of the Brisbane Lions Academy before being drafted by the Lions.

== AFLW Career ==
Pauga debuted in the AFLW against Richmond on 24 September 2022 at the Punt Road Oval. She won a premiership with Brisbane in 2023, shortly after which she was traded to Greater Western Sydney.
