= Mua Laloifi =

Australian rules footballer (born 1993)

Vaomua Laloifi

Personal information
- Born: 24 July 1993 (age 33); Samoa
- Original team: Western Bulldogs (VFLW)
- Draft: No. 52, 2019 national draft
- Debut: Round 1, 2020, Carlton vs. Richmond, at Ikon Park
- Height: 173 cm (5 ft 8 in)
- Position: Defender

Club information
- Current club: Western Bulldogs

Playing career^{1}
Years	Club	Games (Goals)
2020–2023	Carlton	15 (0)
2024–	Western Bulldogs	0 (0)
Total		15 (0)
- ^{1} Playing statistics correct to the end of the 2021 season.

Vaomua Laloifi (born 24 July 1993) is an Australian rules footballer playing for the Western Bulldogs in the AFL Women's (AFLW). She has previously played for Carlton. Laloifi was drafted by Carlton with their sixth selection and fifty-second overall in the 2019 AFL Women's draft. She made her debut against Richmond at Ikon Park in the opening round of the 2020 season.

In December 2023, Laloifi was traded to the Western Bulldogs.

Laloifi was born in Samoa and raised in New Zealand to the age of 16 and is the first Samoan born player in the history of the AFLW.
