= Gabby Biedenweg-Webster =

Australian rules footballer

Personal information
- Full name: Gabrielle Biedenweg-Webster
- Born: 13 January 1998 (age 28); Rand, New South Wales
- Original team: Williamstown
- Debut: Gold Coast vs. St Kilda, at Great Barrier Reef Arena
- Height: 176 cm (5 ft 9 in)
- Position: Forward

Playing career^{1}
Years	Club	Games (Goals)
2022–2023	Gold Coast	3 (0)
2024–2025	Fremantle	22 (8)
Total		25 (8)
- ^{1} Playing statistics correct to the end of the 2025 season.

Gabby Biedenweg-Webster (born 13 January 1998) is an Australian rules footballer who played for the Fremantle Football Club and the Gold Coast Suns in the AFL Women's (AFLW).

She was first selected by Gold Coast as a priority selection in the 2022 AFL Women's Expansion Club signing period after winning the Williamstown's best and fairest award. An indigenous women from the Wiradjuri people, she grew up in Rand, New South Wales before moving to Melbourne for university, where she started playing football. After only playing three games across two seasons for Gold Coast, she was delisted and returned to play for Williamstown.

In June 2024, Biedenweg-Webster was signed by Fremantle as an injury replacement player for Ange Stannett who would miss the upcoming 2024 AFL Women's season with a knee injury. She made her debut for Fremantle in the round 3 match against Port Adelaide and played every game for the remainder of the season. Following the 2025 AFL Women's season, Biedenweg-Webster was delisted by Fremantle, despite having played all but one game that season.
