= Maggie MacLachlan =

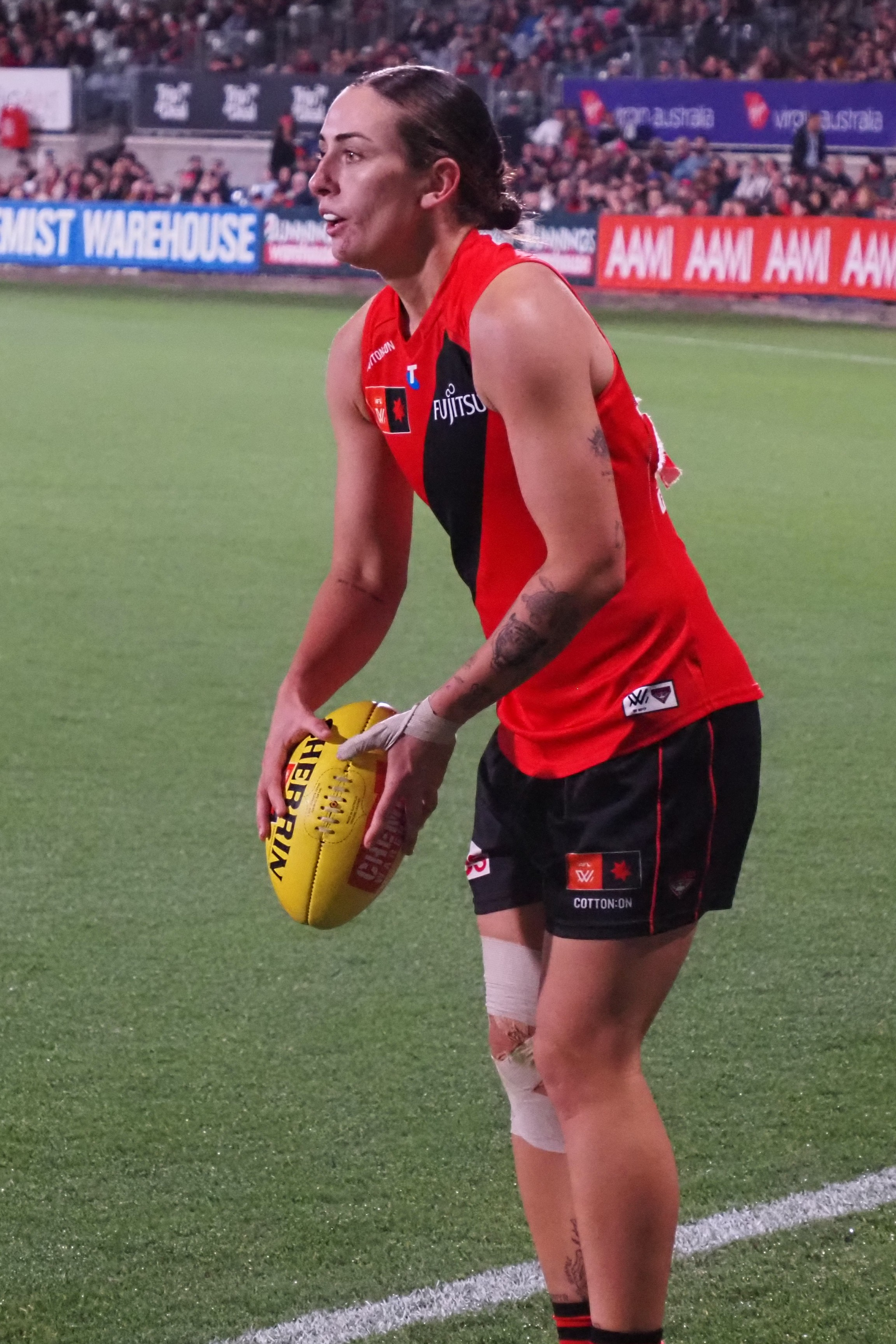
- MacLachlan playing for Essendon in 2025

Personal information
- Born: 30 August 2002 (age 24)
- Original teams: Subiaco (WAFLW); Whitford JFC
- Debut: Round 9, 2022 ^{(S6)}, Fremantle vs. Melbourne, at Perth Stadium
- Height: 172 cm (5 ft 8 in)
- Position: Utility

Club information
- Current club: Essendon
- Number: 21

Playing career^{1}
Years	Club	Games (Goals)
2021–2022 ^{(S6)}	Fremantle	2 (1)
2022 ^{(S7)}–2023	Port Adelaide	7 (0)
2025–	Essendon	11 (4)
Total		20 (5)
- ^{1} Playing statistics correct to the end of 2025.

Maggie MacLachlan (born 30 August 2002) is a professional Australian rules football player who currently plays for Essendon in the AFL Women's (AFLW). She originally played for Fremantle, signed as a replacement player for 2021, before moving to expansion club Port Adelaide.

== AFL Women's career ==
=== Fremantle ===
MacLachlan was signed by Fremantle ahead of the 2021 AFL Women's season as a replacement player for Jessica Trend. Hailing from Subiaco in the WAFL Women's, MacLachlan didn't get her chance at a senior appearance until round nine of season six against Melbourne.

=== Port Adelaide ===
After just two appearances for Fremantle, MacLachlan signed for expansion club Port Adelaide where she managed seven appearances across the team's two inaugural seasons. She was delisted by the club at the conclusion of the 2023 season.

=== Return to Subiaco ===
Following her tenure at the Power, MacLachlan returned to her home club of Subiaco in Western Australia where she played two seasons in the WAFL Women's. She was named in the inaugural WAFLW representative team which faced the SANFL Women's team at Perth Stadium in May 2024.

=== Essendon ===
MacLachlan returned to the AFLW in 2025 when she signed as a replacement player at Essendon, who had list vacancies via Emily Gough and Bess Keaney. She found her best form in the 2025 season, averaging 13 disposals and kicking four goals across eleven games.
