= Ellie Gavalas =

Australian rules footballer (born 1996)

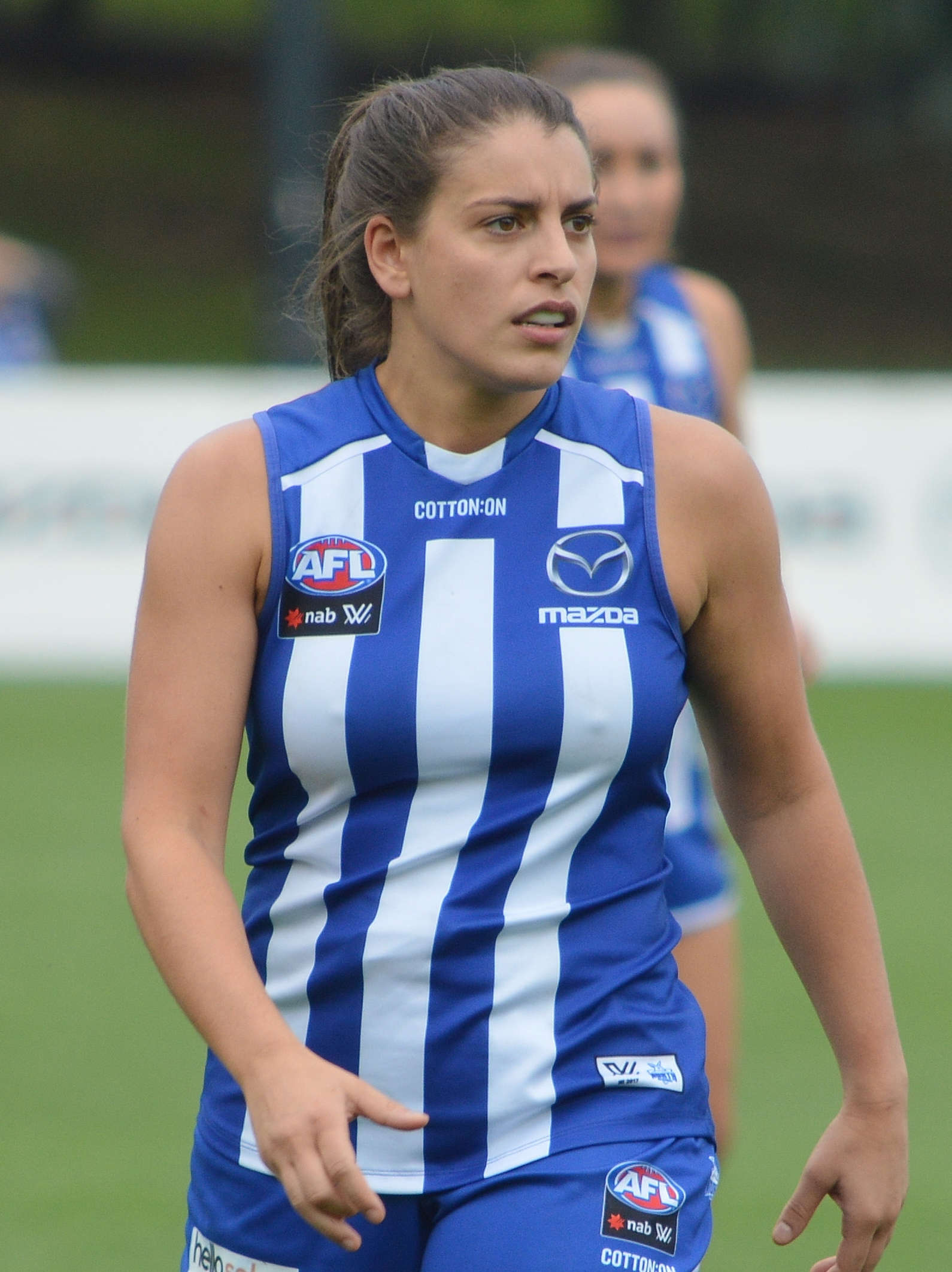
- Gavalas with North Melbourne in March 2021

Personal information
- Born: 25 March 1996 (age 30); Hobart, Tasmania
- Original team: Western Bulldogs (VFLW)
- Draft: No. 10, 2019 AFL Women's draft
- Debut: Round 1, 2020, North Melbourne vs. Melbourne, at Casey Fields
- Height: 160 cm (5 ft 3 in)
- Position: Midfielder

Club information
- Current club: Western Bulldogs

Playing career^{1}
Years	Club	Games (Goals)
2020–2023	North Melbourne	41 (13)
2024–	Western Bulldogs	0 (0)
Total		41 (13)
- ^{1} Playing statistics correct to the end of the 2023 season.

Ellie Gavalas (born 25 March 1996) is an Australian rules footballer playing for the Western Bulldogs in the AFL Women's (AFLW). She has previously played for North Melbourne. Gavalas was drafted by North Melbourne with their first selection and tenth overall in the 2019 AFL Women's draft. She made her debut against Melbourne at Casey Fields in the opening round of the 2020 season. It was revealed she signed on with the club for two more seasons on 17 June 2021, tying her to the club until the end of 2023.

== Career ==
Gavalas grew up playing soccer and played for the Tasmanian state representative team and the Matildas under-17 national team. She made the switch to Australian rules in 2018, playing for Marcellin in the VAFA. Gavalas was named in the 2019 VFLW team of the year playing for the Western Bulldogs. She was also named the Bulldogs' player of the year.

In December 2023, Gavalas was traded to the Western Bulldogs.
