= Celine Moody =

Australian rules footballer

Personal information
- Full name: Celine Claire Moody
- Born: 4 March 1997 (age 29)
- Original team: Carlton (VFLW)
- Draft: 2018 rookie signing
- Debut: Round 1, 2019, Western Bulldogs vs. Adelaide, at Norwood Oval
- Height: 186 cm (6 ft 1 in)
- Position: Ruck

Club information
- Current club: Carlton

Playing career^{1}
Years	Club	Games (Goals)
2019–2023	Western Bulldogs	42 (7)
2024–	Carlton	9 (2)
Total		51 (9)
- ^{1} Playing statistics correct to the end of the 2024 season.

Celine Claire Moody (born 4 March 1997) is an Australian rules footballer playing for Carlton in the AFL Women's (AFLW). She has previously played for the Western Bulldogs.

== Early life ==
Celine is the daughter of Peter Moody, who trained the racehorse Black Caviar. She has a twin sister, Breann Moody, who plays in the AFLW for Carlton. Both attended St Margaret's School, where they played football together. Throughout her junior career Moody usually played as a defender. She trained as an information systems technician for the Australian Army and took a four-year break from football. Moody is a decorated soldier having been awarded the Australian Defence Medal and largely credits the Australian Army and specifically members of the Deployed Signals Troop for her success in the AFLW. On her return in 2018, Moody joined Carlton's VFL Women's side. She played 12 games, mostly as a forward and ruckwoman, wearing number 36.

== AFLW career ==
Having not played football for the previous three years, Moody was eligible to join an AFLW club during the 2018 off-season as a rookie signing. She was recruited by the Western Bulldogs as their second signing and debuted in the opening round of the 2019 AFLW season in a victory over Adelaide at Norwood Oval. It was revealed that Moody had signed a contract extension with the club on 16 June 2021, after playing every game possible for the club that season.

In December 2023, Moody was traded to Carlton.

== Statistics ==
Statistics are correct to the end of the 2025 season.

Legend
G	Goals	K	Kicks	D	Disposals	T	Tackles
B	Behinds	H	Handballs	M	Marks	H/O	Hit-outs

Season	Team	No.	Games	Totals								Averages (per game)								Votes
Season	Team	No.	Games	G	B	K	H	D	M	T	H/O	G	B	K	H	D	M	T	H/O	Votes
2019	Western Bulldogs	13	5	0	1	10	2	12	2	3	48	0.0	0.2	2.0	0.4	2.4	0.4	0.6	9.6	0
2020	Western Bulldogs	13	3	0	0	6	0	6	0	2	40	0.0	0.0	2.0	0.0	2.0	0.0	0.7	13.3	0
2021	Western Bulldogs	13	9	0	0	38	8	46	11	13	130	0.0	0.0	4.2	0.9	5.1	1.2	1.4	14.4	0
2022 (S6)	Western Bulldogs	13	10	2	2	68	21	89	19	21	146	0.2	0.2	6.8	2.1	8.9	1.9	2.1	14.6	-
2022 (S7)	Western Bulldogs	13	11	5	2	51	27	78	20	23	95	0.5	0.2	4.6	2.5	7.1	1.8	2.1	8.6	-
2023	Western Bulldogs	13	4	0	1	19	5	24	8	7	28	0.0	0.1	4.8	1.2	6.0	2.2	1.8	7.0	-
2024	Carlton	13	9	2	2	27	7	34	8	15	24	0.2	0.2	3.0	0.8	3.8	0.9	1.7	2.7	-
Career			51	9	8	219	70	289	69	84	511	0.2	0.2	4.3	1.4	5.7	1.4	1.6	10.0	-
