= Mikayla Hyde =

Australian rules footballer

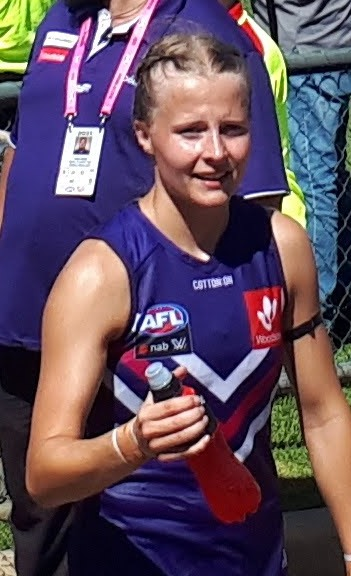
- Hyde in January 2021 with Fremantle

Personal information
- Full name: Mikayla Hyde
- Born: 12 January 2002 (age 24)
- Original team: Swan Districts (WAFLW)
- Debut: Round 1, 2021, Fremantle vs. Greater Western Sydney, at Fremantle Oval
- Height: 165 cm (5 ft 5 in)
- Position: Forward

Playing career^{1}
Years	Club	Games (Goals)
2021–2023	Fremantle	29 (8)
2024–2025	Collingwood	11 (2)
Total		40 (10)
- ^{1} Playing statistics correct to the end of the 2025 season.

Mikayla Hyde (born 12 January 2002) is an Australian rules footballer who played for Fremantle and Collingwood in the AFL Women's (AFLW).

== State football ==
Hyde played for Swan Districts in the WAFL Women's league (WAFLW). She joined the club in 2015 as part of the Rogers Cup squad together with her identical twin Brianna. Together with Brianna, she has also represented Western Australia in the U-18 age group.

== AFLW career ==
=== Fremantle ===
Hyde was selected by Fremantle as a replacement player after Leah Mascall was injured during the pre-season training. She made her debut in the opening round of the 2021 AFL Women's season in Fremantle's win over Greater Western Sydney. It was announced she re-signed with Fremantle on 5 June 2021. At the club, Hyde was utilised mostly as a small forward, known for her agility and forward pressure. She had a standout 2022 year, playing 18 games over season 6 and season 7, collecting 12 disposals in 2 games.

=== Collingwood ===
In December 2023, Hyde was traded to Collingwood in exchange for Ashleigh Brazill with picks being traded too as part of a massive 11-club trade. She made her club debut in Week 10 of the 2024 AFL Women's season against Melbourne. Following her single match in 2024, Hyde played in all bar two matches in the 2025 AFL Women's season and was delisted at the end of the season.

== Personal life ==
Hyde grew up in Perth with her identical twin sister Brianna who also plays football for Swan Districts.

== Statistics ==
Statistics are correct to the end of the 2025 season.

Legend
G	Goals	K	Kicks	D	Disposals	T	Tackles
B	Behinds	H	Handballs	M	Marks

Season	Team	No.	Games	Totals							Averages (per game)						
Season	Team	No.	Games	G	B	K	H	D	M	T	G	B	K	H	D	M	T
2021	Fremantle	28	4	1	0	12	16	28	5	9	0.3	0.0	3.0	4.0	7.0	1.3	2.3
2022 (S6)	Fremantle	28	11	6	2	60	23	83	16	35	0.5	0.2	5.5	2.1	7.5	1.5	3.2
2022 (S7)	Fremantle	28	8	1	2	40	16	56	10	23	0.1	0.3	5.0	2.0	7.0	1.3	2.9
2023	Fremantle	28	6	0	0	51	18	69	10	16	0.0	0.0	8.5	3.0	11.5	1.7	2.7
2024	Collingwood	22	1	0	0	3	3	6	1	2	0.0	0.0	3.0	3.0	6.0	1.0	2.0
2025	Collingwood	22	10	2	0	37	30	67	12	20	0.2	0.0	3.7	3.0	6.7	1.2	2.0
Career			40	10	4	203	106	309	54	105	0.3	0.1	5.1	2.7	7.7	1.4	2.6
