= Katie Lynch =

Australian rules footballer (born 2000)

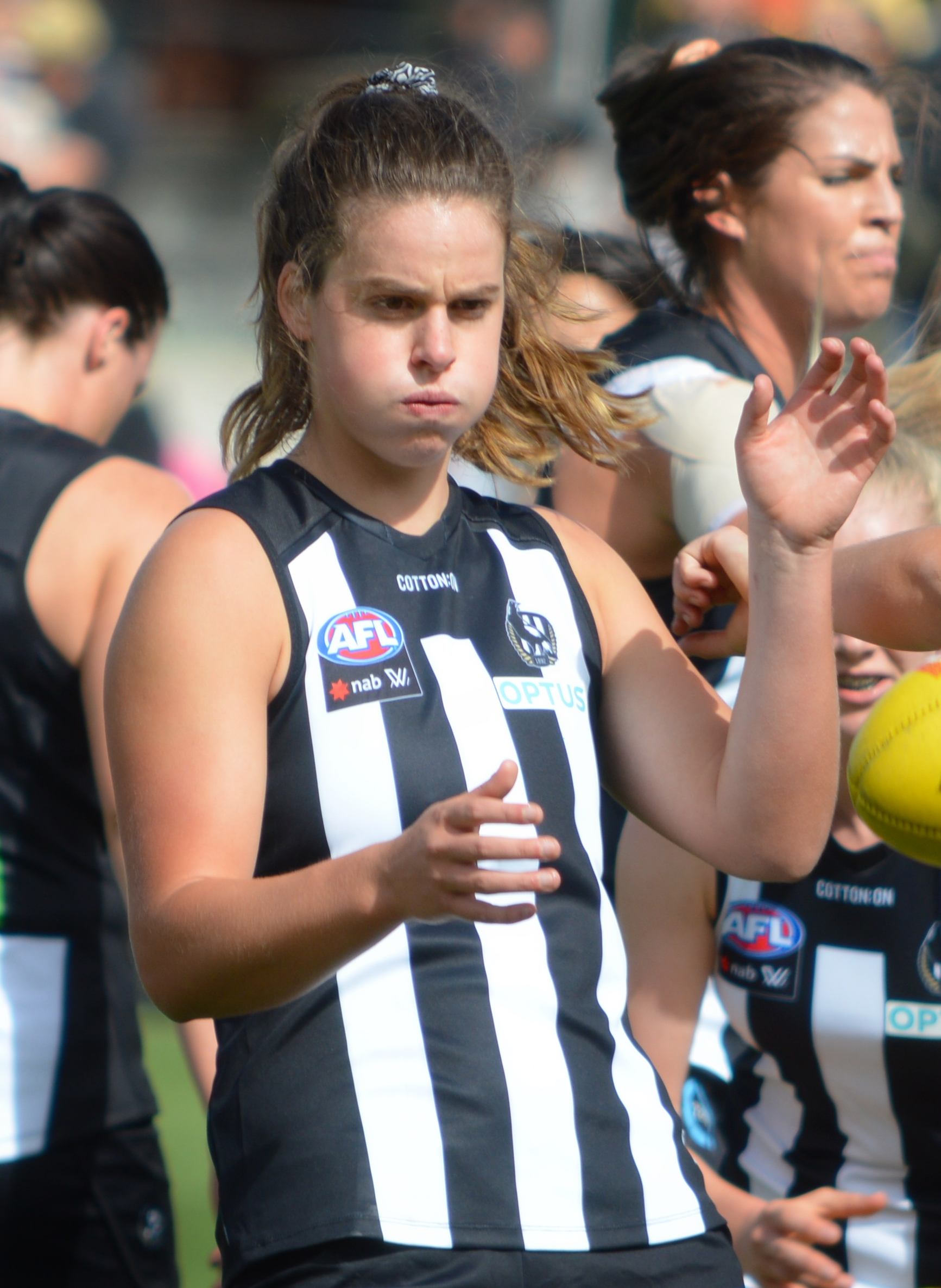
- Lynch with Collingwood in February 2019

Personal information
- Full name: Katie Elizabeth Lynch
- Born: 6 April 2000 (age 26)
- Original team: Oakleigh Chargers (TAC Cup)
- Draft: No. 11, 2018 AFL Women's draft
- Debut: Round 2, 2019, Collingwood vs. Melbourne, at Victoria Park
- Height: 179 cm (5 ft 10 in)
- Position: Midfielder / Defender

Club information
- Current club: Gold Coast

Playing career^{1}
Years	Club	Games (Goals)
2019–2020	Collingwood	7 (1)
2021–2023	Western Bulldogs	35 (0)
2024–	Gold Coast	0 (0)
Total		42 (1)
- ^{1} Playing statistics correct to the end of the 2023 season.

Career highlights
- AFL Women's All-Australian team: S7 (2022)

Katie Elizabeth Lynch (born 6 April 2000) is an Australian rules footballer playing for the Gold Coast in the AFL Women's competition (AFLW). She had previously played for Collingwood and the Western Bulldogs.

== Early life and state football ==
Lynch started with Australian rules football in the Auskick program at Canterbury, Melbourne. She then continued to junior level with the boys at Camberwell Sharks, playing 77 games with them until the under-14s level. During her year with under-11s, she was announced as the Yarra Junior Football League (YJFL) best and fairest and was selected for the V squad, a representative team of the YJFL. At the age of 15 she joined the youth girls' team of Kew Rovers and played 34 games with them, winning Under 15 Girls Best and Fairest in 2015 and Youth Girls Best and Fairest in 2017. In 2016, she fractured her right ankle and didn't return to playing until halfway through 2017. In 2018 Lynch played for Oakleigh Chargers in the TAC Cup and represented Vic Metro in the AFL Women's Under 18 Championships, playing in both midfield and forward positions. During the 2018 season, Lynch was touted for an AFLW draft spot. While representing Vic Metro, she was selected for the initial squad of the 2018 AFL Women's Under 18 All-Australian team. Following this, Lynch also played two games with Collingwood VFL Women's (VFLW) team, the first one being against NT Thunder at Collingwood's home ground Victoria Park. Lynch said that playing in the different competitions helped her adapt to different playing styles, as each one is a different kind of game.

== AFL Women's career ==
=== Collingwood ===
Lynch was drafted by Collingwood with the club's second selection and the 11th pick overall in the 2018 AFL Women's draft. The coach Wayne Siekman said that she's "a tall, big bodied midfielder who can also push forward. Katie uses her size to her advantage to win the ball and also push the opposition off. She has a very damaging left foot kick that rarely misses the target." She made her debut in a loss to Melbourne at Victoria Park in round 2 of the 2019 season. Following her debut, Lynch played in all six of the remaining matches of the season.

=== Western Bulldogs ===
In August 2020, Lynch was traded to the Western Bulldogs along with pick #45 in exchange for pick #33. As soon as Lynch came to the Bulldogs, she had an impact on the team. She played as a defender for the majority of the year. In her first game with the team she broke her career disposals record. She had her best game for the season in the team's Round 8 loss to Adelaide, where she collected 14 disposals, 6 tackles and 3 marks. After a successful season, she won the team's Best Young Player Award alongside teammate Jess Fitzgerald. She signed a contract extension with the club in June 2021, after playing every game possible for the club that season.

After an excellent season 7, in which she took the second-most marks across the AFLW and led the Bulldogs for intercept possessions and rebound 50s, Lynch was rewarded with both 22under22 and All-Australian honours.

=== Gold Coast ===
Ahead of the 2024 AFL Women's season, Lynch was traded to the Gold Coast along with Charlotte Wilson as part of an 11-club deal.

== Personal life ==
Lynch grew up as a Richmond fan, barracking for them in a match against Collingwood a month before being drafted to Collingwood. She studied at Carey Baptist Grammar School and was part of their Australian rules football leadership group.

== Statistics ==
Statistics are correct the end of the 2021 season.

Legend
G	Goals	K	Kicks	D	Disposals	T	Tackles
B	Behinds	H	Handballs	M	Marks

Season	Team	No.	Games	Totals							Averages (per game)						
Season	Team	No.	Games	G	B	K	H	D	M	T	G	B	K	H	D	M	T
2019	Collingwood	16	6	1	0	20	14	34	9	14	0.2	0.0	3.3	2.3	5.7	1.5	2.3
2020	Collingwood	16	1	0	0	2	3	5	1	1	0.0	0.0	2.0	3.0	5.0	1.0	1.0
2021	Western Bulldogs	10	9	0	0	63	20	83	28	22	0.0	0.0	7.0	2.2	9.2	3.1	2.4
Career			16	1	0	86	37	123	38	37	0.1	0.0	5.4	2.3	7.7	2.4	2.3
