= Eleanor Hartill =

Australian rules footballer

Personal information
- Born: 31 May 2000 (age 26)
- Original team: Collegians
- Debut: Rd 3, 2022 (S7), West Coast vs. Essendon, at Mineral Resources Park
- Height: 185 cm (6 ft 1 in)
- Position: Ruck

Club information
- Current club: Brisbane
- Number: 1

Playing career^{1}
Years	Club	Games (Goals)
2022 (S7)–2023	West Coast	16 (1)
2024–	Brisbane	28 (8)
Total		44 (9)
- ^{1} Playing statistics correct to the end of the 2025 season.

Eleanor Hartill (born 31 May 2000) is an Australian rules footballer playing for Brisbane in the AFL Women's competition (AFLW). She is a former West Coast player and NBL1 basketballer.

== Early life and basketball ==
Hartill is from Perth, Western Australia. Hartill played basketball from a young age and reached NBL 1 level, making an NBL1 West debut with Joondalup Wolves in 2021 before going to the Kalamunda Eastern Suns in 2022.

Hartill began playing Australian rules football ruck for the Collegians in the Perth Football League.

== AFLW career ==
Ahead of 2022 season 7, the West Coast Eagles women's team were searching for an injury replacement player for Lauren Walker conducted a talent search resulting in the signing of Hartill. Hartill developed slowly in 2022 season 7 before improving in 2023, becoming serviceable in the ruck with 46 hitouts in 2023.

The departure of Jesse Wardlaw from the Brisbane Lions prompted them to seek a secondary ruck to support Tahlia Hickie and at the end of 2023 organised a three-club trade with West Coast to secure Hartill.

== Statistics ==
Updated to the end of the 2025 season.

Legend
G	Goals	K	Kicks	D	Disposals	T	Tackles
B	Behinds	H	Handballs	M	Marks	H/O	Hit-outs

Season	Team	No.	Games	Totals								Averages (per game)								Votes
Season	Team	No.	Games	G	B	K	H	D	M	T	H/O	G	B	K	H	D	M	T	H/O	Votes
2022 (S7)	West Coast	25	8	1	0	13	20	33	8	13	1	0.1	0.0	1.6	2.5	4.1	1.0	1.6	0.1	0
2023	West Coast	25	8	0	0	18	19	37	6	20	46	0.0	0.0	2.3	2.4	4.6	0.8	2.5	5.8	0
2024	Brisbane	1	13	4	2	47	49	96	19	33	76	0.3	0.2	3.6	3.8	7.4	1.5	2.5	5.8	0
2025	Brisbane	1	15	4	4	38	62	100	22	28	64	0.3	0.3	2.5	4.1	6.7	1.5	1.9	4.3	0
Career			44	9	6	116	150	266	55	94	186	0.2	0.1	2.6	3.4	6.0	1.3	2.1	4.2	0
