= Jasmyn Smith =

Australian rules football player (born 2004)

Personal information
- Born: 10 May 2004 (age 22); Gold Coast, Queensland
- Original team: Bond University (QAFLW)
- Draft: No. 52, 2022 AFL Women's draft
- Debut: Round 1, 2022 (S7), Gold Coast vs. North Melbourne, at Bellerive Oval
- Height: 158 cm (5 ft 2 in)
- Position: Forward

Club information
- Current club: Western Bulldogs
- Number: 10

Playing career^{1}
Years	Club	Games (Goals)
S7 (2022)–2023	Gold Coast	5 (0)
2024–	Western Bulldogs	24 (2)
Total		29 (2)
- ^{1} Playing statistics correct to the end of round 1 2026.

Jasmyn Smith (born 10 May 2004) is an Australian rules footballer playing for the Western Bulldogs in the AFL Women's competition (AFLW). She has previously played for the Gold Coast.

== Early life ==
Smith was born and raised on the Gold Coast, Queensland where she attended Emmanuel College and served as school vice captain in 2022. Her mother, Michaela is a Commonwealth Games bronze medallist and Australian singles champion in badminton and her father, Shane, is a former Broadbeach, Southport and Geelong Football League AFL player, and professional triathlete. Jasmyn first participated in her school's Auskick program in grade four but didn't take the sport seriously until the professional AFLW competition was established in 2017. Jasmyn was a state level netball player at the time, and her Queensland U15 team won the Australian Indoor Netball Championship. She joined the Broadbeach Cats in 2018 when the club fielded their first U17 female team which Smith joined with her older sister, Tyra, as a 13-year old. Smith would take part in three consecutive junior grand finals with Broadbeach, winning two premierships. Smith won the South East Qld league Best and Fairest award and captained her undefeated Broadbeach team in 2021. She switched to play for Bond University in the top state level QAFLW competition and was also a member of the Gold Coast Suns Academy program where she was named in their team of the year. Smith also co-captained the Queensland U18 state team. Smith excelled and was drafted by hometown team Gold Coast Suns with pick 52 in the 2022 AFL Women's draft.

== AFLW career ==
Smith made her AFLW debut for the Suns in round 1 of the AFLW season seven at 18 years of age. She played five games across two seasons at the club.

Ahead of the 2024 AFL Women's season, Smith was traded to the Western Bulldogs as part of an 11-player trade. She played all 11 matches for the Bulldogs in her debut season at the club.

== In the media ==
Along with football, Smith is a model, actress and featured as a host on Network 10's Shake Takes television program in her younger years alongside future Disney actor Mekonnen Knife. Her career in the media began in her teenage years, when she was a presenter on Nickelodeon from age 12, and later, Channel 10.
