= Tamara Luke =

Female Australian rules footballer

Personal information
- Full name: Tamara Luke
- Born: 22 February 1988 (age 38)
- Original team: Hawthorn (VFLW)
- Draft: No. 33, 2019 national draft
- Debut: Round 3, 2020, St Kilda vs. Melbourne, at RSEA Park
- Height: 180 cm (5 ft 11 in)
- Position: Ruck

Club information
- Current club: Richmond
- Number: 40

Playing career^{1}
Years	Club	Games (Goals)
2020–2021	St Kilda	6 (1)
2022 (S7)–2023	Hawthorn	9 (0)
2024	Richmond	6 (2)
Total		21 (3)
- ^{1} Playing statistics correct to the end of 2024.

Tamara Luke (born 22 February 1988) is a former Australian rules footballer who played for the St Kilda Football Club and the Hawthorn Football Club in the AFL Women's (AFLW). She has played for Hawthorn's VFLW team. In March 2021, she was delisted by St Kilda. On 3 November 2023 she announced her retirement.

However, in August 2024, Luke signed with Richmond as a replacement player for the injured Montana McKinnon.

== Statistics ==
Legend
G	Goals	K	Kicks	D	Disposals	T	Tackles
B	Behinds	H	Handballs	M	Marks

Season	Team	No.	Games	Totals								Averages (per game)								Votes
Season	Team	No.	Games	G	B	K	H	D	M	T	H/O	G	B	K	H	D	M	T	H/O	Votes
2020	St Kilda	22	1	0	0	7	3	10	3	1	1	0.0	0.0	7.0	3.0	10.0	3.0	1.0	1.0	0
2021	St Kilda	22	5	1	1	15	5	20	7	9	30	0.2	0.2	3.0	1.0	4.0	1.4	1.8	6.0	0
2022 (S7)	Hawthorn	22	2	0	0	8	1	9	3	3	17	0.0	0.0	4.0	0.5	4.5	1.5	1.5	8.5	0
2023	Hawthorn	22	9	0	0	25	13	38	11	20	96	0.0	0.0	4.2	2.2	6.3	1.8	3.3	16.0	0
Career			17	1	1	55	22	77	24	33	144	0.1	0.1	3.9	1.6	5.5	1.7	2.4	10.3	0

== Honours and achievements ==
Individual

- Hawthorn best club person: 2022 (S7)
