= Rene Caris =

Australian rules footballer

Personal information
- Born: 18 March 1999 (age 27)
- Original team: Greater Western Victoria U18
- Draft: No. 35, 2018 national draft
- Debut: Round 5, 2019, Geelong vs. Brisbane, at Moreton Bay Central Sports Complex
- Height: 184 cm (6 ft 0 in)
- Position: Ruck

Club information
- Current club: St Kilda

Playing career^{1}
Years	Club	Games (Goals)
2019–2022	Geelong	12 (1)
2023	Greater Western Sydney	5 (1)
2024–	St Kilda	13 (1)
Total		30 (3)
- ^{1} Playing statistics correct to the end of the 2023 season.

Rene Caris (born 18 March 1999) is an Australian rules footballer who plays for St Kilda in the AFL Women's (AFLW). She has previously played for Geelong and Greater Western Sydney.

Caris is from Horsham, Victoria and attended Ballarat Grammar School. She played with Greater Western Victoria Rebels in the TAC Cup and Carlton in the VFL Women's (VFLW) competition. She was named in the TAC Cup's "Team of the Year" in 2018, and was subsequently drafted with selection number 35 by Geelong in the 2018 AFL Women's draft.

Caris made her AFLW debut during the fifth round of the 2019 season, against Brisbane at Moreton Bay Central Sports Complex.

In June 2022, Caris was delisted by Geelong.

She joined Greater Western Sydney ahead of the 2023 season as a replacement player for small forward Meghan Gaffney.

In December 2023, Caris was traded to St Kilda in exchange for a third round pick.

== Personal life ==
Caris is currently studying a Bachelor of Civil Engineering at Deakin University.
