= Courtney Murphy =

Personal information
- Full name: Courtney Murphy
- Born: 11 July 2000 (age 26); Sunshine Coast, Queensland
- Original teams: Brisbane Lions Academy, Mountain Creek State High School
- Draft: 2023 Rookie Signing
- Debut: Round 2, 2024, Greater Western Sydney vs. Richmond, at Punt Road Oval
- Height: 181 cm (5 ft 11 in)
- Position: Ruck

Club information
- Current club: Essendon
- Number: 33

Playing career
Years	Club	Games (Goals)
2023	Brisbane	0 (0)
2024	Greater Western Sydney	1 (0)
2025	Essendon	6 (1)

Courtney Murphy (born 11 July 2000) is an Australian rules footballer and former basketballer. Murphy currently plays for the Essendon Football Club in the AFL Women's (AFLW), and was previously on the list of the Brisbane Lions and the Greater Western Sydney Giants.

Originally from the Sunshine Coast in Queensland, she was a guard for the Seattle Redhawks women's basketball team from 2018 to 2022, where she ranked second in the team's history for most three-point field goals. After graduating with a bachelors degree, she transferred to Long Beach State Beach women's basketball program where she played one season before returning to Australia and switching sports to Australian rules football, signing as a rookie with Brisbane.
