= Jodie Hicks =

Australian rules footballer and cricketer (born 1997)

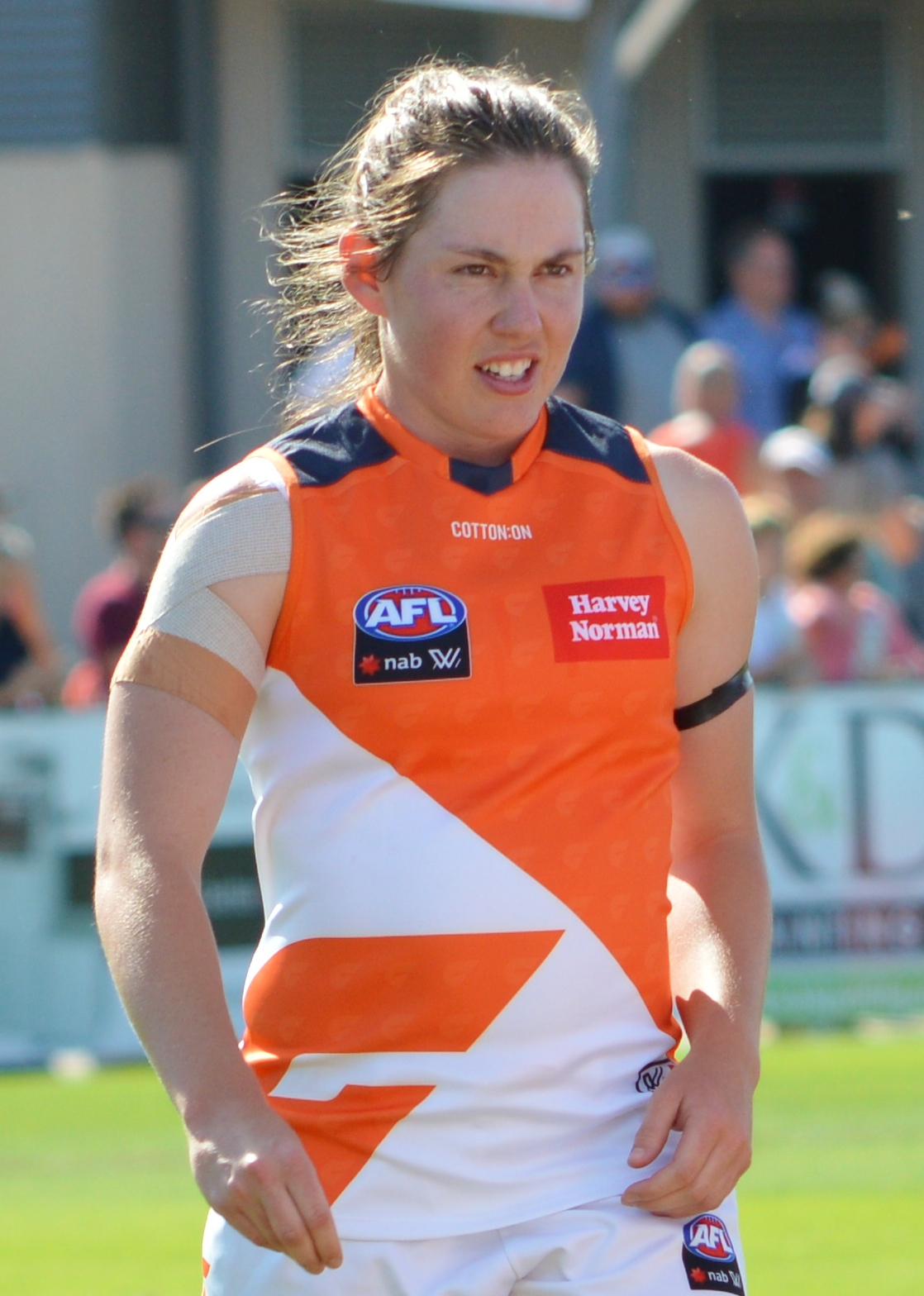
- Hicks playing Australian rules football for Greater Western Sydney in February 2018
- Born: 19 January 1997 (age 29); Hay, New South Wales
- Height: 160 cm (5 ft 3 in)
Australian rules football career
Personal information
- Original team: Belconnen (AFL Canberra)
- Draft: No. 5, 2017 AFL Women's draft, No. 84, 2022 AFL Women's Draft
- Debut: Round 1, 2018, Greater Western Sydney vs. Melbourne, at Casey Fields
- Position: Midfield / forward
Playing career^{1}
Years	Club	Games (Goals)
2018–2021; 2022 (S7)–2023	Greater Western Sydney	40 (5)
2024–2025	Richmond	18 (0)
Total		58 (5)
- ^{1} Playing statistics correct to the end of the 2025 season.
- Cricket career

Cricket information
- Batting: Right-handed
- Bowling: Right-arm medium

Career statistics
Competition	List A	Twenty20
Matches	5	38
Runs scored	26	26
Batting average	13.00	3.71
100s/50s	0/0	0/0
Top score	18*	10*
Balls bowled	36	60
Wickets	0	2
Bowling average	–	43.50
5 wickets in innings	–	0
10 wickets in match	–	0
Best bowling	–	1/8
Catches/stumpings	0/–	8/–
- Source: CricketArchive, 5 October 2025

Jodie Hicks (born 19 January 1997) is an Australian rules footballer who plays for Richmond in the AFL Women's (AFLW) competition, and a cricketer playing for the Sydney Sixers in the Women's Big Bash League. She has previously played in the AFLW for Greater Western Sydney.

== Early life ==
Hicks was born and raised in Hay, in the western Riverina region of New South Wales. She was a passionate Australian rules footballer until the age of 14, when the combination of a lack of female-dedicated teams and rules forbidding her continuing to play with boys forced her to give up the sport. From there she took up cricket, becoming accomplished as a junior.

== Australian rules football ==
Since giving up competitive football at age 14 Hicks played only at select representative carnivals. Despite this, she was twice named an under 18 All Australian and in 2015 was selected as an emergency for Melbourne in the 2015 Women's football exhibition match.

=== AFL Women's ===
Hicks was drafted by Greater Western Sydney with their first pick and the fifth selection overall in the 2017 AFL Women's draft.

She made her debut in the six-point loss to Melbourne at Casey Fields in the opening round of the 2018 season.

In June 2021, Hicks was delisted by the Greater Western Sydney, after playing 20 games over four seasons.

In June 2022, after not playing in 2022 AFL Women's season 6, when she played and coached with Macquarie University, Hicks was re-drafted by Greater Western Sydney ahead of 2022 season 7.

In December 2023, Hicks was traded to Richmond.

On 22 October, Hicks announced her retirement from AFLW.

== Cricket ==
Hicks plays club cricket at Sydney Cricket Club in Sydney. In the 2015 female national championships Hicks represented the NWS/ACT, scoring 151 runs (18.9 ave) and taking seven wickets (19.3 ave). As a result, she was later selected in the Australian under 18 squad that same year. She was also invited to the Cricket Australia under 18 talent camp.

She has since played for the ACT Meteors in the Women's National Cricket League and the Sydney Sixers in the Women's Big Bash League.
