= Bess Keaney =

Australian rules footballer (born 1991)

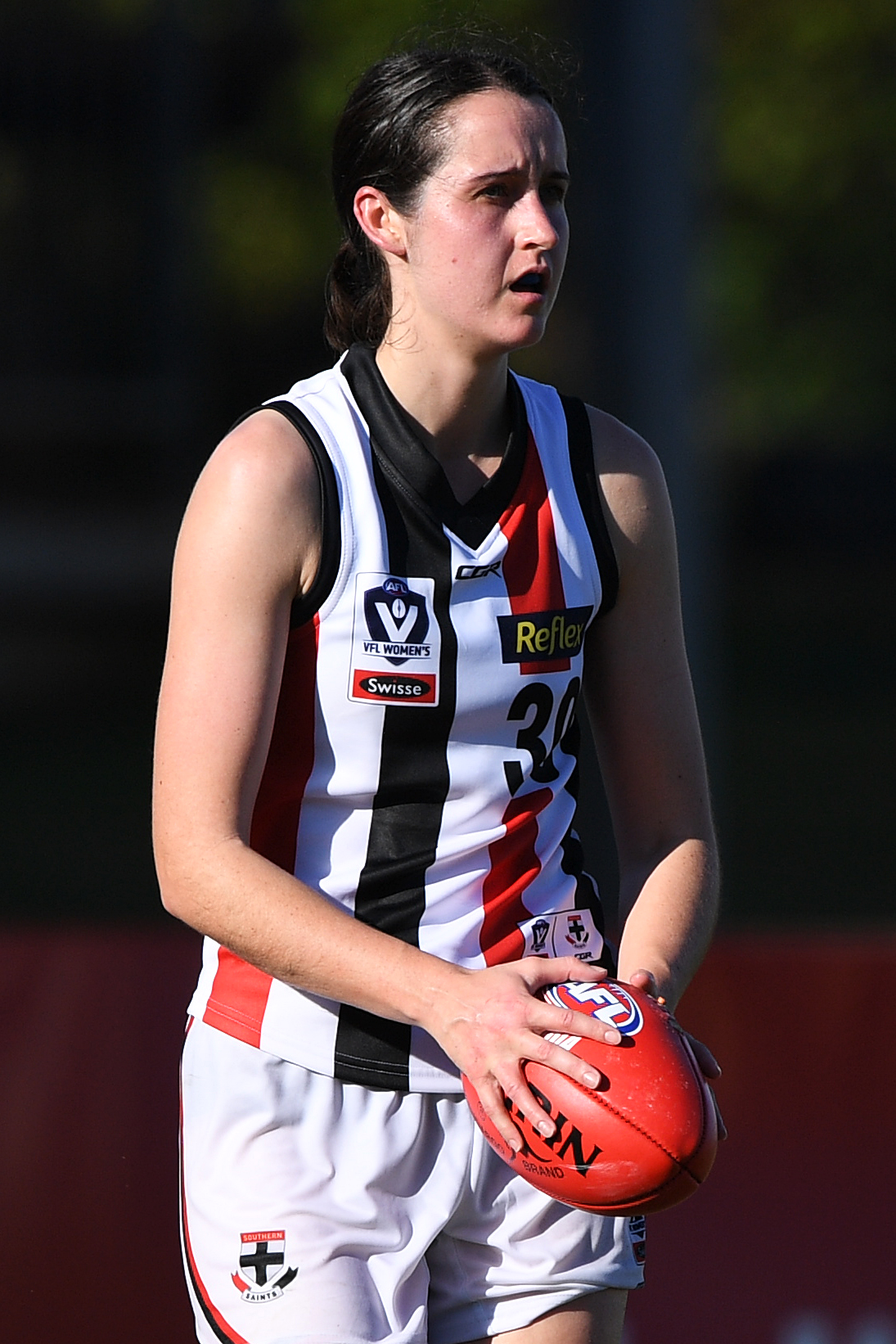
- Keaney in May 2019

Personal information
- Full name: Elizabeth Keaney
- Nickname: Bess
- Born: 22 December 1991 (age 34)
- Original team: Southern Saints (VFLW)
- Draft: No. 58, 2020 AFL Women's draft
- Debut: Round 1, 2021, Gold Coast vs. Melbourne, at Metricon Stadium
- Height: 174 cm (5 ft 9 in)
- Position: Defender

Club information
- Current club: Essendon

Playing career^{1}
| Years | Club | Games (Goals) |
| 2021–2023 | Gold Coast | 39 (1) |
| 2024– | Essendon | 0 (0) |
| Total | | 39 (1) |
- ^{1} Playing statistics correct to the end of the 2023 season.

Elizabeth "Bess" Keaney (born 22 December 1991) is an Australian rules footballer with the Essendon Football Club in the AFL Women's (AFLW). She previously played for the Gold Coast Suns from 2021 to 2023.

== Early life ==
A hockey player in her younger years, Keaney switched to Australian rules football in 2019 and played club football for Melbourne University as well as the Southern Saints.

== AFL Women's career ==
Keaney made her AFLW debut for the Gold Coast Suns in round 1 of the 2021 AFL Women's season.

Keaney was traded to Essendon ahead of the 2024 AFL Women's season.
