= Alison Drennan =

Australian rules footballer

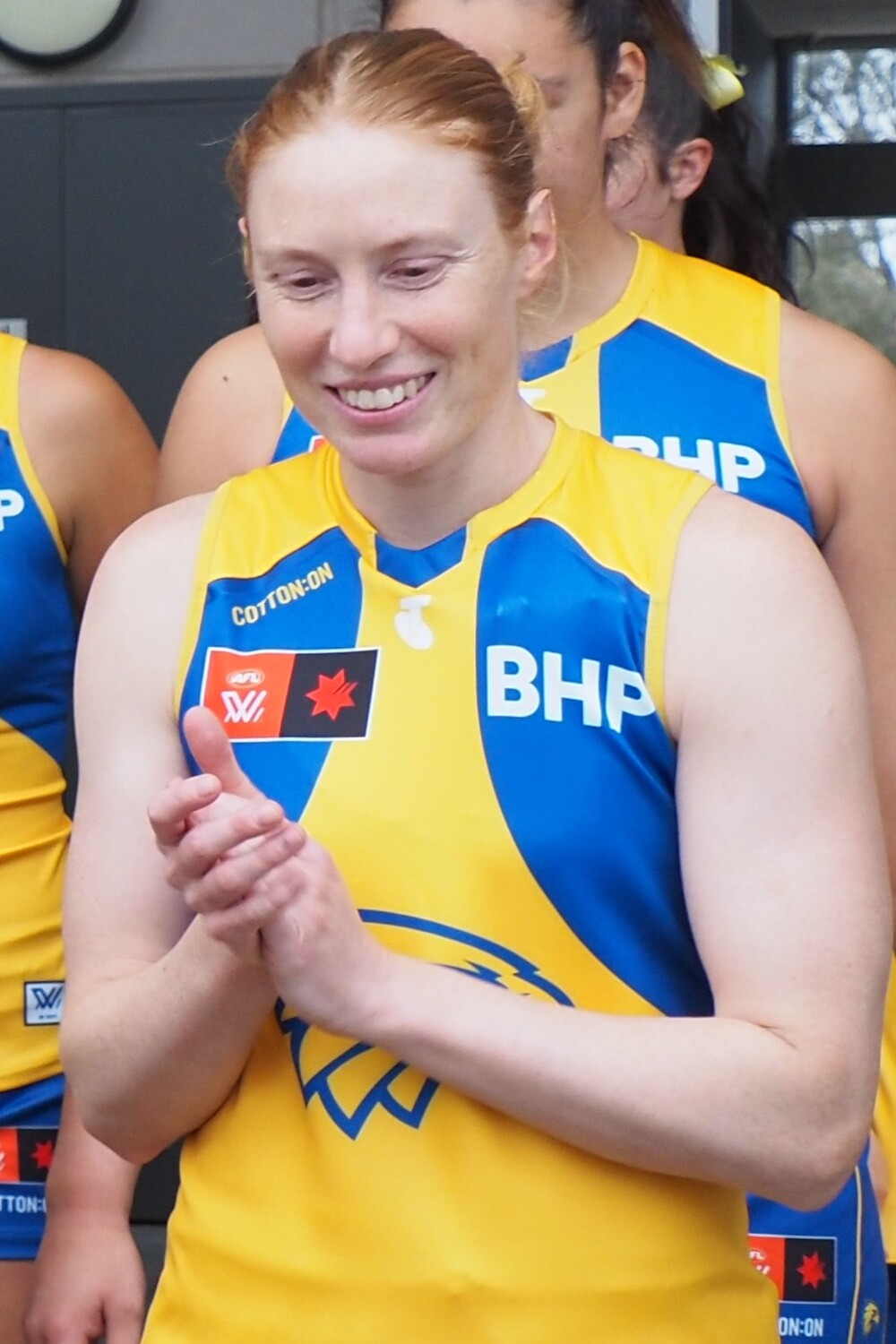
- Drennan pre-match with West Coast in 2025

Personal information
- Born: 30 January 1991 (age 35)
- Original team: Southern Saints (VFLW)
- Debut: Round 1, 2019, North Melbourne vs. Carlton, at North Hobart Oval
- Height: 176 cm (5 ft 9 in)
- Position: Midfielder

Club information
- Current club: West Coast

Playing career^{1}
Years	Club	Games (Goals)
2019	North Melbourne	7 (1)
2020	St Kilda	5 (0)
2021–2023	Gold Coast	40 (3)
2024–	West Coast	18 (2)
Total		70 (6)
- ^{1} Playing statistics correct to the end of the 2025 season.

Alison Drennan (born 30 January 1991) is an Australian rules footballer playing for West Coast in the AFL Women's (AFLW). She has previously played for North Melbourne, St Kilda, and the Gold Coast.

== AFL Women's career ==
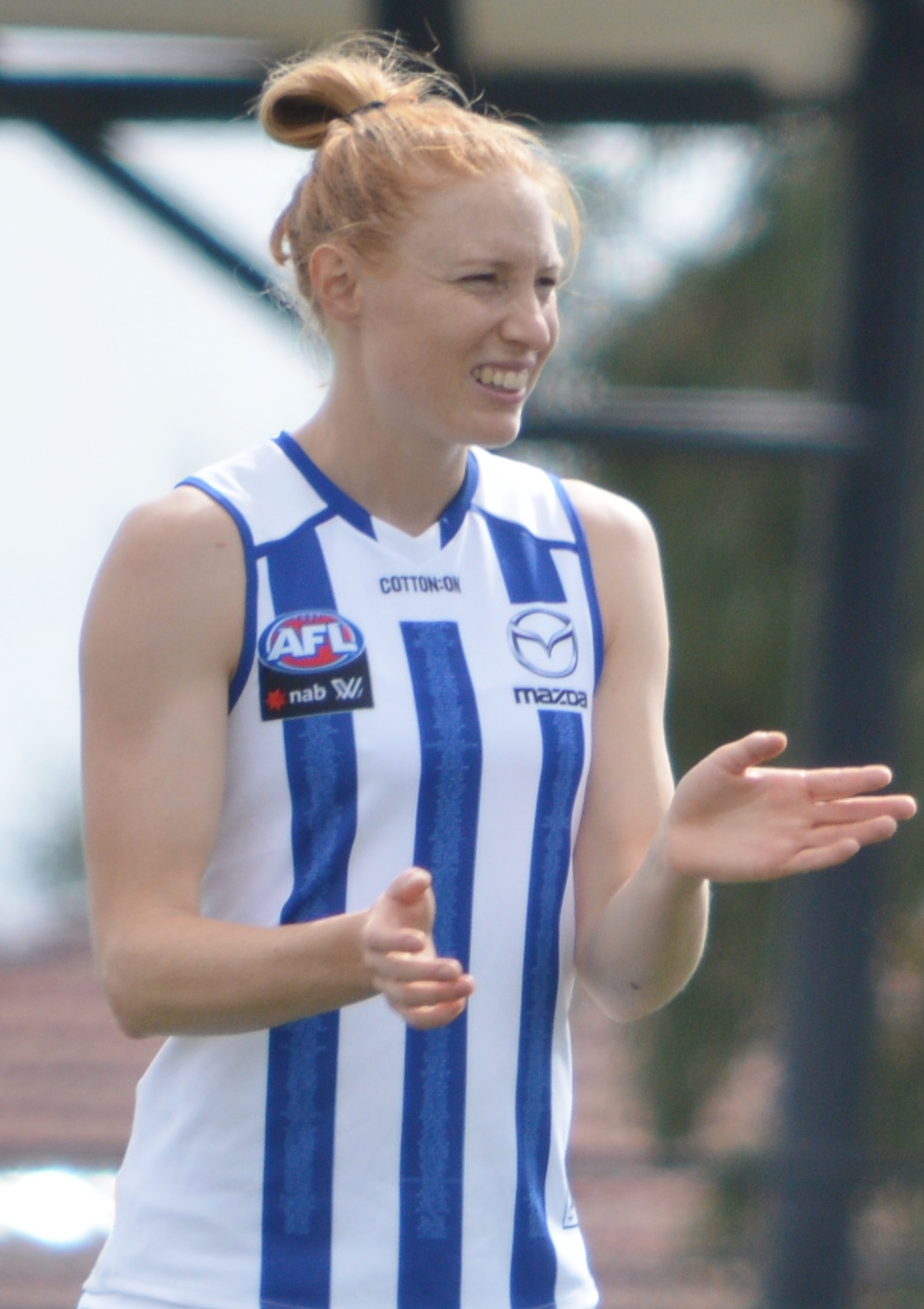
Drennan during a pre-season practice match for North Melbourne in 2019

=== North Melbourne (2019) ===
Drennan was signed by North Melbourne as a free agent during the expansion club signing period in 2018. She made her debut in the club's inaugural match, a 36-point victory over Carlton at North Hobart Oval in the opening round of the 2019 season.

=== St Kilda (2020) ===
Ahead of the 2020 season, Drennan was signed by expansion club St Kilda.

=== Gold Coast (2021–2023) ===
In August 2020, Drennan was traded to Gold Coast in exchange for the 24th pick of the 2020 AFL Women's draft, which Gold Coast secured from Brisbane in exchange for Taylor Smith.

=== West Coast (2024–present) ===
Ahead of the 2024 AFL Women's season, Drennan was traded to West Coast in exchange for a second round draft pick.
