= List of AFL Women's debuts in 2022 season 7 =

The following is a list of all players in the AFL Women's (AFLW) who either made their AFLW debut or played for a new club during 2022 AFL Women's season 7.

== Summary ==
Summary of debuts in 2022 season 7
Club	Debut		Total
Club	AFLW	New club	Total
Adelaide	3	2	5
Brisbane	1	1	2
Carlton	5	3	8
Collingwood	3	3	6
Essendon	13	15	28
Fremantle	6	1	7
Geelong	4	3	7
Gold Coast	7	3	10
Greater Western Sydney	6	0	6
Hawthorn	18	12	30
Melbourne	3	4	7
North Melbourne	8	0	8
Port Adelaide	16	14	30
Richmond	2	4	6
St Kilda	4	2	6
Sydney	18	12	30
West Coast	8	5	13
Western Bulldogs	3	2	5
Total	128	86	214

== AFL Women's debuts ==
Name	Club	Age at debut	Debut round	Recruiting method
Mia Austin	Carlton	18 years, 125 days	1	Pick 18, 2022 AFL Women's draft
Imogen Evans	Collingwood	18 years, 201 days	1	Free agent, 2022
Maeve Chaplin	Melbourne	20 years, 4 days	1	Pick 44, 2022 AFL Women's draft
Tayla Gatt	North Melbourne	18 years, 228 days	1	Pick 28, 2022 AFL Women's draft
Charli Granville	North Melbourne	18 years, 193 days	1	Pick 50, 2022 AFL Women's draft
Sophia McCarthy	North Melbourne	20 years, 69 days	1	Pick 39, 2022 AFL Women's draft
Erika O'Shea	North Melbourne	20 years, 62 days	1	Rookie signing, 2022
Vikki Wall	North Melbourne	24 years, 117 days	1	Rookie signing, 2022
Georgia Clayden	Gold Coast	27 years, 87 days	1	Priority signing, 2022
Claire Ransom	Gold Coast	18 years, 187 days	1	Pick 34, 2022 AFL Women's draft
Jasmyn Smith	Gold Coast	18 years, 109 days	1	Pick 52, 2022 AFL Women's draft
Sasha Goranova	West Coast	21 years, 80 days	1	Priority signing, 2022
Ella Roberts	West Coast	17 years, 253 days	1	Pick 14, 2022 AFL Women's draft
Isabella Simmons	West Coast	20 years, 130 days	1	Trade, 2022
Alex Ballard	Port Adelaide	19 years, 303 days	1	Expansion pre-list open-age signing, 2022
Amelie Borg	Port Adelaide	17 years, 283 days	1	Pick 61, 2022 AFL Women's draft
Abbey Dowrick	Port Adelaide	19 years, 338 days	1	Expansion pre-list open-age signing, 2022
Hannah Ewings	Port Adelaide	18 years, 163 days	1	Pick 3, 2022 AFL Women's draft
Olivia Levicki	Port Adelaide	29 years, 219 days	1	Rookie signing, 2022
Liz McGrath	Port Adelaide	24 years, 247 days	1	Expansion pre-list open-age signing, 2022
Sachi Syme	Port Adelaide	17 years, 282 days	1	Pick 23, 2022 AFL Women's draft
Julia Teakle	Port Adelaide	19 years, 15 days	1	Expansion pre-list open-age signing, 2022
Molly Eastman	Sydney	24 years, 78 days	1	Expansion pre-list open-age signing, 2022
Montana Ham	Sydney	18 years, 151 days	1	Pick 1, 2022 AFL Women's draft
Cynthia Hamilton	Sydney	18 years, 147 days	1	Pick 11, 2022 AFL Women's draft
Ella Heads	Sydney	19 years, 64 days	1	Expansion pre-list open-age signing, 2022
Sofia Hurley	Sydney	18 years, 209 days	1	Pick 5, 2022 AFL Women's draft
Genevieve Lawson-Tavan	Sydney	25 years, 298 days	1	Replacement signing, 2022
Paige Sheppard	Sydney	21 years, 126 days	1	Expansion pre-list open-age signing, 2022
Sarah Skinner	Sydney	22 years, 316 days	1	Expansion pre-list open-age signing, 2022
Lauren Szigeti	Sydney	22 years, 180 days	1	Expansion pre-list open-age signing, 2022
Aimee Whelan	Sydney	26 years, 285 days	1	Expansion pre-list open-age signing, 2022
Hannah Stuart	St Kilda	28 years, 246 days	1	Pick 63, 2022 AFL Women's draft
Amber Clarke	Essendon	17 years, 248 days	1	Pick 4, 2022 AFL Women's draft
Federica Frew	Essendon	26 years, 74 days	1	Expansion pre-list open-age signing, 2022
Amelia Radford	Essendon	27 years, 45 days	1	Pick 62, 2022 AFL Women's draft
Paige Scott	Essendon	18 years, 63 days	1	Pick 8, 2022 AFL Women's draft
Mia Van Dyke	Essendon	17 years, 241 days	1	Pick 46, 2022 AFL Women's draft
Ashleigh Van Loon	Essendon	18 years, 16 days	1	Pick 73, 2022 AFL Women's draft
Steph Wales	Essendon	19 years, 89 days	1	Pick 32, 2022 AFL Women's draft
Zoe Barbakos	Hawthorn	18 years, 288 days	1	Expansion pre-list open-age signing, 2022
Charlotte Baskaran	Hawthorn	17 years, 261 days	1	Pick 9, 2022 AFL Women's draft
Catherine Brown	Hawthorn	28 years, 229 days	1	Expansion pre-list open-age signing, 2022
Dominique Carbone	Hawthorn	20 years, 336 days	1	Expansion pre-list open-age signing, 2022
Bridget Deed	Hawthorn	19 years, 173 days	1	Expansion pre-list open-age signing, 2022
Mackenzie Eardley	Hawthorn	18 years, 89 days	1	Pick 6, 2022 AFL Women's draft
Tahlia Fellows	Hawthorn	22 years, 272 days	1	Expansion pre-list open-age signing, 2022
Jasmine Fleming	Hawthorn	17 years, 295 days	1	Pick 2, 2022 AFL Women's draft
Sophie Locke	Hawthorn	21 years, 125 days	1	Expansion pre-list open-age signing, 2022
Eliza Shannon	Hawthorn	22 years, 308 days	1	Expansion pre-list open-age signing, 2022
Tamara Smith	Hawthorn	22 years, 83 days	1	Expansion pre-list open-age signing, 2022
Lucy Wales	Hawthorn	19 years, 89 days	1	Pick 22, 2022 AFL Women's draft
Rylie Wilcox	Western Bulldogs	17 years, 268 days	1	Pick 21, 2022 AFL Women's draft
Heidi Woodley	Western Bulldogs	17 years, 284 days	1	Pick 37, 2022 AFL Women's draft
Madison Brazendale	Greater Western Sydney	19 years, 216 days	1	Pick 75, 2022 AFL Women's draft
Cambridge McCormick	Greater Western Sydney	23 years, 272 days	1	Pick 84, 2022 AFL Women's draft
Megan Kauffman	Fremantle	25 years, 160 days	1	Pick 77, 2022 AFL Women's draft
Orlagh Lally	Fremantle	21 years, 31 days	1	Rookie signing, 2022
Amy Mulholland	Fremantle	29 years, 22 days	1	Pick 83, 2022 AFL Women's draft
Madeleine Scanlon	Fremantle	21 years, 173 days	1	Pick 27, 2022 AFL Women's draft
Mia Skinner	Geelong	21 years, 210 days	1	Pick 33, 2022 AFL Women's draft
Katelyn Cox	Richmond	24 years, 88 days	1	Pick 60, 2022 AFL Women's draft
Eilish Sheerin	Richmond	29 years, 327 days	1	Pick 58, 2022 AFL Women's draft
Alexandra Morcom	Essendon	26 years, 13 days	2	Replacement signing, 2022
Keeley Skepper	Carlton	18 years, 173 days	2	Pick 17, 2022 AFL Women's draft
Sarah Ford	Sydney	26 years, 133 days	2	Expansion pre-list open-age signing, 2022
Kate Reynolds	Sydney	24 years, 340 days	2	Replacement signing, 2022
Giselle Davies	Gold Coast	19 years, 171 days	2	Pick 30, 2021 AFL Women's draft
Tara Stribley	Fremantle	18 years, 171 days	3	Pick 59, 2022 AFL Women's draft
Tiarne Cavanagh	Sydney	25 years, 34 days	3	Rookie signing, 2022
Eliza Vale	Sydney	21 years, 243 days	3	Expansion pre-list open-age signing, 2022
Meghan Gaffney	Greater Western Sydney	19 years, 161 days	3	Pick 66, 2022 AFL Women's draft
Zarlie Goldsworthy	Greater Western Sydney	17 years, 296 days	3	Pick 20, 2022 AFL Women's draft
Kalani Scoullar	Geelong	18 years, 195 days	3	Replacement signing, 2022
Lily Goss	Carlton	22 years, 195 days	3	Pick 48, 2022 AFL Women's draft
Imogen Milford	Carlton	22 years, 283 days	3	Pick 26, 2021 AFL Women's draft
Yasmin Duursma	Port Adelaide	18 years, 165 days	3	Pick 45, 2022 AFL Women's draft
Jade Halfpenny	Port Adelaide	20 years, 122 days	3	Expansion pre-list open-age signing, 2022
Laura Elliott	Hawthorn	17 years, 319 days	3	Pick 26, 2022 AFL Women's draft
Bridie Hipwell	Hawthorn	18 years, 88 days	3	Pick 10, 2022 AFL Women's draft
Isabelle Porter	Hawthorn	24 years, 225 days	3	Expansion pre-list open-age signing, 2022
Eleanor Hartill	West Coast	22 years, 103 days	3	Replacement signing, 2022
Ella Maurer	North Melbourne	20 years, 227 days	4	Pick 56, 2021 AFL Women's draft
Jaide Britton	West Coast	19 years, 278 days	4	Pick 47, 2022 AFL Women's draft
Gabrielle Biedenweg-Webster	Gold Coast	24 years, 230 days	4	Priority signing, 2022
Deanna Jolliffe	St Kilda	29 years, 185 days	4	Pick 74, 2022 AFL Women's draft
Simone Nalder	St Kilda	32 years, 79 days	4	Replacement signing, 2022
Sarah Goodwin	Port Adelaide	18 years, 70 days	7	Pick 7, 2022 AFL Women's draft
Jaide Anthony	Sydney	18 years, 301 days	4	Expansion pre-list open-age signing, 2022
Aine McDonagh	Hawthorn	24 years, 20 days	4	Rookie signing, 2022
Keely Coyne	Western Bulldogs	17 years, 299 days	4	Pick 29, 2022 AFL Women's draft
Lily-Rose Williamson	Essendon	18 years, 24 days	4	Replacement signing, 2022
Georgia Campbell	Melbourne	19 years, 17 days	4	Pick 41, 2021 AFL Women's draft
Blaithin Mackin	Melbourne	23 years, 241 days	4	Rookie signing, 2022
Abbygail Bushby	West Coast	18 years, 55 days	5	Pick 24, 2022 AFL Women's draft
Brooke Plummer	Geelong	17 years, 345 days	5	Pick 42, 2022 AFL Women's draft
J'Noemi Anderson	St Kilda	17 years, 279 days	5	Pick 16, 2022 AFL Women's draft
Charlotte Taylor	Collingwood	18 years, 248 days	5	Pick 30, 2022 AFL Women's draft
Megan Ryan	Essendon	26 years, 284 days	5	Replacement signing, 2022
Renee Tierney	Essendon	20 years, 123 days	5	Expansion pre-list open-age signing, 2022
Emily Everist	Hawthorn	18 years, 68 days	5	Pick 25, 2022 AFL Women's draft
Mikayla Pauga	Brisbane	19 years, 167 days	5	Pick 46, 2021 AFL Women's draft
Jess Waterhouse	Adelaide	25 years, 230 days	5	Replacement signing, 2022
Jenna Richardson	Hawthorn	20 years, 349 days	6	Expansion pre-list open-age signing, 2022
Ella Smith	West Coast	22 years, 51 days	6	Priority signing, 2022
Ella Boag	Port Adelaide	18 years, 85 days	6	Pick 31, 2022 AFL Women's draft
Tessa Doumanis	Port Adelaide	22 years, 355 days	6	Expansion pre-list open-age signing, 2022
Grace Hill	Greater Western Sydney	24 years, 75 days	6	Replacement signing, 2022
Taylor Ortlepp	Carlton	25 years, 101 days	6	Rookie signing, 2022
Melissa Bragg	Geelong	27 years, 288 days	6	Replacement signing, 2022
Zoe Savarirayan	North Melbourne	17 years, 340 days	6	Rookie signing, 2022
Kiara Beesley	Sydney	20 years, 190 days	6	Expansion pre-list open-age signing, 2022
Ruby Sargent-Wilson	Sydney	19 years, 50 days	6	Expansion pre-list NGA signing, 2022
Keeley Kustermann	Adelaide	18 years, 174 days	7	Pick 40, 2022 AFL Women's draft
Litonya Cockatoo-Motlap	Port Adelaide	19 years, 183 days	7	Expansion pre-list open-age signing, 2022
Olivia Barton	Essendon	21 years, 239 days	7	Expansion pre-list open-age signing, 2022
Mia Busch	Essendon	18 years, 144 days	7	Pick 35, 2022 AFL Women's draft
Lily Johnson	Port Adelaide	18 years, 185 days	8	Pick 80, 2022 AFL Women's draft
Zoe Hurrell	Sydney	21 years, 0 days	8	Expansion pre-list open-age signing, 2022
Kaylee Kimber	Gold Coast	19 years, 32 days	8	Replacement signing, 2022
Madizen Wilkins	Fremantle	21 years, 168 days	8	Elevated train-on player (mid-season)
Kiera Mueller	Adelaide	19 years, 183 days	9	Pick 69, 2022 AFL Women's draft
Ashleigh Gomes	West Coast	25 years, 28 days	9	Replacement signing, 2022
Laquoiya Cockatoo-Motlap	Port Adelaide	19 years, 198 days	9	Expansion pre-list open-age signing, 2022
Emily Smith	Collingwood	27 years, 292 days	10	Rookie signing, 2022
Hannah Bowey	North Melbourne	24 years, 50 days	10	Replacement signing, 2022
Tess Cattle	Greater Western Sydney	18 years, 313 days	10	Pick 86, 2022 AFL Women's draft
Krystal Scott	Gold Coast	28 years, 13 days	10	Priority signing, 2022

== Change of AFL Women's club ==
Name	Club	Age at debut	Debut round	Former club/s	Recruiting method
Phoebe McWilliams	Carlton	36 years, 359 days	1	Greater Western Sydney	Trade, 2022
Phoebe McWilliams	Carlton	36 years, 359 days	1	Geelong	Trade, 2022
Amelia Velardo	Carlton	20 years, 89 days	1	Collingwood	Trade, 2022
Lauren Brazzale	Collingwood	28 years, 293 days	1	Carlton	Trade, 2022
Sarah Sansonetti	Collingwood	21 years, 23 days	1	Richmond	Delisted free agent, 2022
Niamh Kelly	Adelaide	26 years, 361 days	1	West Coast	Trade, 2022
Jordan Ivey	Melbourne	29 years, 301 days	1	Carlton	Trade, 2022
Jordan Ivey	Melbourne	29 years, 301 days	1	Geelong	Trade, 2022
Sammie Johnson	Melbourne	30 years, 20 days	1	St Kilda	Pick 49, 2022 AFL Women's draft
Ashlee Atkins	Gold Coast	29 years, 147 days	1	Fremantle	Free agent, 2022
Ashlee Atkins	Gold Coast	29 years, 147 days	1	West Coast	Free agent, 2022
Tahlia Meyer	Gold Coast	27 years, 52 days	1	St Kilda	Delisted free agent, 2022
Kate Bartlett	West Coast	23 years, 77 days	1	Western Bulldogs	Priority signing, 2022
Emma Humphries	West Coast	28 years, 31 days	1	Melbourne	Priority signing, 2022
Emma Humphries	West Coast	28 years, 31 days	1	North Melbourne	Priority signing, 2022
Krstel Petrevski	West Coast	21 years, 141 days	1	Melbourne	Trade, 2022
Jess Sedunary	West Coast	31 years, 290 days	1	Adelaide	Trade, 2022
Jess Sedunary	West Coast	31 years, 290 days	1	St Kilda	Trade, 2022
Mikayla Western	West Coast	24 years, 57 days	1	Fremantle	Pick 53, 2022 AFL Women's draft
Jade de Melo	Port Adelaide	29 years, 199 days	1	Fremantle	Expansion pre-list open-age signing, 2022
Hannah Dunn	Port Adelaide	31 years, 8 days	1	Greater Western Sydney	Expansion signing, 2022
Hannah Dunn	Port Adelaide	31 years, 8 days	1	Gold Coast	Expansion signing, 2022
Ange Foley	Port Adelaide	33 years, 257 days	1	Adelaide	Expansion signing, 2022
Cheyenne Hammond	Port Adelaide	24 years, 29 days	1	Gold Coast	Trade, 2022
Gemma Houghton	Port Adelaide	28 years, 239 days	1	Fremantle	Expansion signing, 2022
Maggie MacLachlan	Port Adelaide	19 years, 362 days	1	Fremantle	Expansion signing, 2022
Maria Moloney	Port Adelaide	27 years, 151 days	1	Brisbane	Expansion signing, 2022
Justine Mules	Port Adelaide	27 years, 255 days	1	Adelaide	Expansion signing, 2022
Ebony O'Dea	Port Adelaide	23 years, 285 days	1	Collingwood	Expansion signing, 2022
Erin Phillips	Port Adelaide	37 years, 100 days	1	Adelaide	Expansion signing, 2022
Kate Surman	Port Adelaide	30 years, 303 days	1	Gold Coast	Trade, 2022
Indy Tahau	Port Adelaide	19 years, 309 days	1	Brisbane	Expansion signing, 2022
Jacqui Yorston	Port Adelaide	21 years, 306 days	1	Brisbane	Trade, 2022
Jacqui Yorston	Port Adelaide	21 years, 306 days	1	Gold Coast	Trade, 2022
Sarah Dargan	Sydney	23 years, 205 days	1	Collingwood	Expansion signing, 2022
Sarah Dargan	Sydney	23 years, 205 days	1	Richmond	Expansion signing, 2022
Lexi Hamilton	Sydney	21 years, 312 days	1	Gold Coast	Expansion signing, 2022
Lexi Hamilton	Sydney	21 years, 312 days	1	North Melbourne	Expansion signing, 2022
Bridie Kennedy	Sydney	22 years, 338 days	1	Carlton	Expansion pre-list open-age signing, 2022
Brooke Lochland	Sydney	31 years, 116 days	1	Western Bulldogs	Expansion signing, 2022
Ally Morphett	Sydney	18 years, 289 days	1	Greater Western Sydney	Trade, 2022
Aliesha Newman	Sydney	26 years, 345 days	1	Melbourne	Expansion signing, 2022
Aliesha Newman	Sydney	26 years, 345 days	1	Collingwood	Expansion signing, 2022
Rebecca Privitelli	Sydney	27 years, 236 days	1	Carlton	Expansion signing, 2022
Rebecca Privitelli	Sydney	27 years, 236 days	1	Greater Western Sydney	Expansion signing, 2022
Bella Smith	Sydney	20 years, 341 days	1	Collingwood	Expansion signing, 2022
Lisa Steane	Sydney	27 years, 218 days	1	Greater Western Sydney	Expansion signing, 2022
Brenna Tarrant	Sydney	20 years, 297 days	1	Melbourne	Expansion signing, 2022
Alana Woodward	Sydney	32 years, 45 days	1	Richmond	Delisted free agent, 2022
Alana Woodward	Sydney	32 years, 45 days	1	St Kilda	Delisted free agent, 2022
Erin McKinnon	St Kilda	23 years, 255 days	1	Greater Western Sydney	Trade, 2022
Nicola Stevens	St Kilda	29 years, 156 days	1	Collingwood	Trade, 2022
Nicola Stevens	St Kilda	29 years, 156 days	1	Carlton	Trade, 2022
Sophie Alexander	Essendon	29 years, 94 days	1	Collingwood	Expansion signing, 2022
Daria Bannister	Essendon	23 years, 129 days	1	Western Bulldogs	Expansion signing, 2022
Daria Bannister	Essendon	23 years, 129 days	1	North Melbourne	Expansion signing, 2022
Alana Barba	Essendon	20 years, 335 days	1	Gold Coast	Delisted free agent, 2022
Steph Cain	Essendon	26 years, 84 days	1	Fremantle	Expansion signing, 2022
Joanne Doonan	Essendon	28 years, 54 days	1	Carlton	Expansion pre-list open-age signing, 2022
Ellyse Gamble	Essendon	24 years, 345 days	1	Western Bulldogs	Expansion signing, 2022
Georgia Gee	Essendon	22 years, 303 days	1	Carlton	Expansion signing, 2022
Danielle Marshall	Essendon	31 years, 12 days	1	Western Bulldogs	Expansion pre-list open-age signing, 2022
Cat Phillips	Essendon	30 years, 318 days	1	Melbourne	Expansion signing, 2022
Cat Phillips	Essendon	30 years, 318 days	1	St Kilda	Expansion signing, 2022
Maddy Prespakis	Essendon	21 years, 298 days	1	Carlton	Expansion signing, 2022
Bonnie Toogood	Essendon	24 years, 262 days	1	Western Bulldogs	Expansion signing, 2022
Sophie Van De Heuvel	Essendon	21 years, 260 days	1	Geelong	Expansion signing, 2022
Jacqui Vogt	Essendon	28 years, 168 days	1	St Kilda	Expansion signing, 2022
Jess Wuetschner	Essendon	30 years, 121 days	1	Brisbane	Delisted free agent, 2022
Kaitlyn Ashmore	Hawthorn	30 years, 292 days	1	Brisbane	Trade, 2022
Kaitlyn Ashmore	Hawthorn	30 years, 292 days	1	North Melbourne	Trade, 2022
Tegan Cunningham	Hawthorn	34 years, 216 days	1	Melbourne	Expansion pre-list open-age signing, 2022
Jess Duffin	Hawthorn	33 years, 61 days	1	Collingwood	Expansion signing, 2022
Jess Duffin	Hawthorn	33 years, 61 days	1	North Melbourne	Expansion signing, 2022
Aileen Gilroy	Hawthorn	29 years, 179 days	1	North Melbourne	Expansion signing, 2022
Tilly Lucas-Rodd	Hawthorn	26 years, 131 days	1	Carlton	Expansion signing, 2022
Tilly Lucas-Rodd	Hawthorn	26 years, 131 days	1	St Kilda	Expansion signing, 2022
Tamara Luke	Hawthorn	34 years, 186 days	1	St Kilda	Expansion pre-list open-age signing, 2022
Akec Makur Chuot	Hawthorn	29 years, 356 days	1	Fremantle	Delisted free agent, 2022
Akec Makur Chuot	Hawthorn	29 years, 356 days	1	Richmond	Delisted free agent, 2022
Sarah Perkins	Hawthorn	29 years, 32 days	1	Adelaide	Expansion signing, 2022
Sarah Perkins	Hawthorn	29 years, 32 days	1	Melbourne	Expansion signing, 2022
Sarah Perkins	Hawthorn	29 years, 32 days	1	Gold Coast	Expansion signing, 2022
Louise Stephenson	Hawthorn	27 years, 49 days	1	Greater Western Sydney	Expansion signing, 2022
Daisy Bateman	Western Bulldogs	22 years, 189 days	1	North Melbourne	Trade, 2022
Nikki Gore	Fremantle	21 years, 260 days	1	Adelaide	Trade, 2022
Mikayla Bowen	Geelong	21 years, 133 days	1	West Coast	Trade, 2022
Jackie Parry	Geelong	26 years, 47 days	1	Melbourne	Trade, 2022
Shelley Scott	Geelong	34 years, 165 days	1	Melbourne	Trade, 2022
Grace Egan	Richmond	22 years, 88 days	1	Carlton	Trade, 2022
Libby Graham	Richmond	24 years, 350 days	1	Greater Western Sydney	Trade, 2022
Stephanie Williams	Richmond	20 years, 213 days	1	Geelong	Trade, 2022
Amber Ward	Adelaide	20 years, 326 days	2	West Coast	Trade, 2022
Olivia Barber	Collingwood	20 years, 52 days	2	Geelong	Trade, 2022
Dee Heslop	Brisbane	21 years, 36 days	2	Gold Coast	Pick 57, 2022 AFL Women's draft
Kate McCarthy	Hawthorn	29 years, 315 days	2	Brisbane	Delisted free agent, 2022
Kate McCarthy	Hawthorn	29 years, 315 days	2	St Kilda	Delisted free agent, 2022
Courtney Jones	Gold Coast	21 years, 359 days	2	Carlton	Trade, 2022
Charlotte Wilson	Melbourne	21 years, 256 days	3	Carlton	Trade, 2022
Ainslie Kemp	Hawthorn	25 years, 177 days	3	Melbourne	Expansion pre-list open-age signing, 2022
Jordan Zanchetta	Essendon	27 years, 177 days	3	Brisbane	Expansion pre-list open-age signing, 2022
Brittany Perry	Port Adelaide	28 years, 192 days	4	Greater Western Sydney	Trade, 2022
Brittany Perry	Port Adelaide	28 years, 192 days	4	Gold Coast	Trade, 2022
Maddy Collier	Sydney	27 years, 9 days	5	Greater Western Sydney	Expansion signing, 2022
Maddy Collier	Sydney	27 years, 9 days	5	West Coast	Expansion signing, 2022
Christina Bernardi	Carlton	32 years, 108 days	5	Collingwood	Elevated train-on player (mid-season)
Christina Bernardi	Carlton	32 years, 108 days	5	Greater Western Sydney	Elevated train-on player (mid-season)
Christina Bernardi	Carlton	32 years, 108 days	5	Richmond	Elevated train-on player (mid-season)
Sabreena Duffy	Melbourne	22 years, 181 days	5	Fremantle	Free agent, 2022
Jemima Woods	Richmond	19 years, 119 days	5	Western Bulldogs	Delisted free agent, 2022
Millie Brown	Western Bulldogs	21 years, 259 days	6	Geelong	Trade, 2022
Janet Baird	Hawthorn	22 years, 283 days	9	Gold Coast	Expansion signing, 2022

== See also ==
- List of AFL Women's debuts in 2022 season 6
- List of AFL debuts in 2022
