= 2022 AFL Women's draft =

10th women's draft organised by the Australian Football League

General information
- Date: 29 June 2022
- Time: 7:00pm AEST
- Sponsored by: NAB

Overview
- League: AFL Women's
- First selection: Montana Ham (Sydney)

The 2022 AFL Women's draft consists of the various periods when the 18 clubs in the AFL Women's competition can recruit players prior to the competition's seventh season.

== Expansion club signing period ==
The expansion clubs Essendon, Hawthorn, Port Adelaide, and Sydney are able to sign up to 14 current AFLW players before the sign and trade period. They can also pre-list under-18 players from their Next Generation Academy (NGA) region or players as open-age signings if they previously nominated for the AFLW draft and aren't on a current list.

Table of pre-list signings
Date	Player	Club	Recruited from		Classification	Ref
Date	Player	Club	Club	League	Classification	Ref
21 February	Bridget Deed	Hawthorn	Hawthorn	VFLW	Open-age	
11 March	Georgia Nanscawen	Essendon	Essendon	VFLW	Open-age	
14 March	Ruby Sargent-Wilson	Sydney	Bond University	QAFLW	NGA	
21 March	Sarah Ford	Sydney	Essendon	VFLW	Open-age	
21 March	Molly Eastman	Sydney	North Melbourne	VFLW	Open-age	
21 March	Lauren Szigeti	Sydney	Hawthorn	VFLW	Open-age	
21 March	Aimee Whelan	Sydney	Hawthorn	VFLW	Open-age	
22 March	Zoe Barbakos	Hawthorn	Sandringham Dragons	NAB League	Open-age	
31 March	Sophie Locke	Hawthorn	Port Melbourne	VFLW	Open-age	
12 April	Zoe Hurrell	Sydney	North Shore	AFL Sydney	Open-age	
12 April	Ella Heads	Sydney	Inner West Magpies	AFL Sydney	Open-age	
22 April	Caitlin Sargent	Essendon	Western Jets	NAB League	Open-age	
3 May	Dominique Carbone	Hawthorn	Hawthorn	VFLW	Open-age	
10 May	Jaide Anthony	Sydney	Dandenong Stingrays	NAB League	Open-age	
11 May	Tegan Cunningham	Hawthorn	Hawthorn	VFLW	Open-age	
11 May	Eliza Shannon	Hawthorn	Hawthorn	VFLW	Open-age	
13 May	Joanne Doonan	Essendon	Essendon	VFLW	Open-age	
13 May	Federica Frew	Essendon	Essendon	VFLW	Open-age	
13 May	Danielle Marshall	Essendon	Essendon	VFLW	Open-age	
13 May	Jordan Zanchetta	Essendon	Essendon	VFLW	Open-age	
17 May	Laquoiya Cockatoo-Motlap	Port Adelaide	Bond University	QAFLW	Open-age	
17 May	Litonya Cockatoo-Motlap	Port Adelaide	Bond University	QAFLW	Open-age	
24 May	Tamara Luke	Hawthorn	Hawthorn	VFLW	Open-age	
24 May	Jenna Richardson	Hawthorn	Hawthorn	VFLW	Open-age	
24 May	Tahlia Fellows	Hawthorn	Casey	VFLW	Open-age	
25 May	Jorja Borg	Essendon	Carlton	VFLW	Open-age	
30 May	Kiara Beesley	Sydney	Southern Power	AFL Sydney	Open-age	
31 May	Jade de Melo	Port Adelaide	North Adelaide	SANFLW	Open-age	
31 May	Jade Halfpenny	Port Adelaide	Norwood	SANFLW	Open-age	
1 June	Renee Tierney	Essendon	Essendon	VFLW	Open-age	
1 June	Bella Ayre	Essendon	Essendon	VFLW	Open-age	
1 June	Eloise Ashley-Cooper	Essendon	Essendon	VFLW	Open-age	
1 June	Tessa Doumanis	Port Adelaide	Claremont	WAFLW	Open-age	
1 June	Abbey Dowrick	Port Adelaide	Subiaco	WAFLW	Open-age	
2 June	Ainslie Kemp	Hawthorn	Hawthorn	VFLW	Open-age	
2 June	Isabelle Porter	Hawthorn	Hawthorn	VFLW	Open-age	
2 June	Catherine Brown	Hawthorn	Hawthorn	VFLW	Open-age	
2 June	Alex Ballard	Port Adelaide	Sturt	SANFLW	Open-age	
2 June	Liz McGrath	Port Adelaide	North Melbourne	VFLW	Open-age	
3 June	Bridie Kennedy	Sydney	Williamstown	VFLW	Open-age	
3 June	Sarah Skinner	Sydney	North Melbourne	VFLW	Open-age	
3 June	Paige Sheppard	Sydney	Geelong	VFLW	Open-age	
3 June	Eliza Vale	Sydney	Western Bulldogs	VFLW	Open-age	
3 June	Kate Bartlett	West Coast	Peel Thunder	WAFLW	Priority	
3 June	Ella Smith	West Coast	Claremont	WAFLW	Priority	
3 June	Sasha Goranova	West Coast	Claremont	WAFLW	Priority	
6 June	Gabrielle Biedenweg-Webster	Gold Coast	Williamstown	VFLW	Priority	
6 June	Georgia Clayden	Gold Coast	Ainslie	AFL Canberra	Priority	
6 June	Krystal Scott	Gold Coast	Bond University	QAFLW	Priority	
9 June	Julia Teakle	Port Adelaide	East Fremantle	WAFLW	Open-age	
9 June	Tamara Smith	Hawthorn	Geelong	VFLW	Open-age	
10 June	Emma Humphries	West Coast	Hawthorn	VFLW	Priority	
10 June	Olivia Barton	Essendon	Port Melbourne	VFLW	Open-age	

Table of expansion club AFLW signings
Date	Player	Former club	New club	Ref
21 March	Maddy Collier	West Coast	Sydney	
11 April	Maddy Prespakis	Carlton	Essendon	
11 April	Georgia Gee	Carlton	Essendon	
11 April	Rebecca Privitelli	Greater Western Sydney	Sydney	
11 April	Lisa Steane	Greater Western Sydney	Sydney	
13 April	Bonnie Toogood	Western Bulldogs	Essendon	
26 April	Stephanie Cain	Fremantle	Essendon	
27 April	Erin Phillips	Adelaide	Port Adelaide	
30 April	Ange Foley	Adelaide	Port Adelaide	
3 May	Sophie Alexander	Collingwood	Essendon	
5 May	Justine Mules	Adelaide	Port Adelaide	
9 May	Maria Moloney	Brisbane	Port Adelaide	
10 May	Gemma Houghton	Fremantle	Port Adelaide	
10 May	Brenna Tarrant	Melbourne	Sydney	
13 May	Indy Tahau	Brisbane	Port Adelaide	
16 May	Tilly Lucas-Rodd	St Kilda	Hawthorn	
16 May	Jess Duffin	North Melbourne	Hawthorn	
16 May	Janet Baird	Gold Coast	Hawthorn	
17 May	Bella Smith	Collingwood	Sydney	
17 May	Ebony O'Dea	Collingwood	Port Adelaide	
17 May	Sarah Perkins	Gold Coast	Hawthorn	
17 May	Louise Stephenson	Greater Western Sydney	Hawthorn	
24 May	Brooke Lochland	Western Bulldogs	Sydney	
25 May	Daria Bannister	North Melbourne	Essendon	
25 May	Cat Phillips	St Kilda	Essendon	
25 May	Jacqui Vogt	St Kilda	Essendon	
25 May	Sophie Van De Heuvel	Geelong	Essendon	
26 May	Hannah Dunn	Gold Coast	Port Adelaide	
27 May	Maggie MacLachlan	Fremantle	Port Adelaide	
27 May	Sarah Dargan	Richmond	Sydney	
30 May	Aileen Gilroy	North Melbourne	Hawthorn	
30 May	Aliesha Newman	Collingwood	Sydney	
30 May	Lexi Hamilton	North Melbourne	Sydney	
30 May	Ellyse Gamble	Western Bulldogs	Essendon	

== Signing and trading period ==
Players can be signed for one or two year contracts.

=== Retirements and delistings ===
Table of player retirements and delistings
Date	Name	Club	Status	Ref
2 March	Courtney Guard	West Coast	Retired	
11 March	Danielle Higgins	Geelong	Retired	
13 March	Ashleigh Guest	Western Bulldogs	Retired	
16 March	Andrea Gilmore	West Coast	Retired	
23 March	Tayla Bresland	West Coast	Retired	
24 March	Melissa Caulfield	West Coast	Retired	
7 April	Katie Loynes	Greater Western Sydney	Retired	
19 April	Ann McMahon	Fremantle	Delisted	
19 April	Tiah Toth	Fremantle	Delisted	
19 April	Jasmin Stewart	Fremantle	Retired	
6 May	Ashlee Atkins	West Coast	Delisted	
6 May	Lauren Gauci	West Coast	Delisted	
10 May	Hannah Scott	Western Bulldogs	Retired	
16 May	Akec Makur Chuot	Richmond	Delisted	
17 May	Imogen Purcell	Collingwood	Delisted	
26 May	Christina Bernardi	Richmond	Delisted	
26 May	Hannah McLaren	Richmond	Delisted	
26 May	Sarah Sansonetti	Richmond	Delisted	
27 May	Kate McCarthy	St Kilda	Delisted	
27 May	Tahlia Meyer	St Kilda	Delisted	
27 May	Paige Price	St Kilda	Delisted	
27 May	Isabella Shannon	St Kilda	Delisted	
27 May	Alana Woodward	St Kilda	Delisted	
30 May	Jess Wuetschner	Brisbane	Delisted	
31 May	Lauren Magee	Melbourne	Delisted	
31 May	Maeve Chaplin	Melbourne	Delisted	
1 June	Parris Laurie	West Coast	Retired	
3 June	Erin Lorenzini	Greater Western Sydney	Retired	
7 June	Alana Barba	Gold Coast	Delisted	
7 June	Dee Heslop	Gold Coast	Delisted	
7 June	Rhiannon Watt	St Kilda	Delisted	
8 June	Rene Caris	Geelong	Delisted	
8 June	Madisen Maguire	Geelong	Delisted	
8 June	Carly Remmos	Geelong	Delisted	
8 June	Denby Taylor	Geelong	Retired	
9 June	Brittany Gibson	North Melbourne	Delisted	
9 June	Elisha King	North Melbourne	Delisted	
9 June	Tara Slender	North Melbourne	Retired	
9 June	Ashton Hill	West Coast	Retired	
10 June	Olivia Meagher	Collingwood	Delisted	
10 June	Sabreena Duffy	Fremantle	Delisted	
16 June	Tayla Stahl	Richmond	Retired	
17 June	McKenzie Dowrick	Adelaide	Delisted	
30 June	Brooke Vernon	Carlton	Delisted	

=== Trades ===
Table of trades
Clubs involved	Trade		Ref
St Kilda Carlton	to St Kilda (from Carlton): Nicola Stevens	to Carlton (from St Kilda): pick #28	
Richmond Geelong	to Richmond (from Geelong): Stephanie Williams	to Geelong (from Richmond): Ingrid Houtsma	
West Coast Melbourne	to West Coast (from Melbourne): Isabella Simmons; Krstel Petrevski; pick #77	to Melbourne (from West Coast): pick #50	
Geelong Melbourne	to Geelong (from Melbourne): Jacqueline Parry; Shelley Scott	to Melbourne (from Geelong): Jordan Ivey; pick #51	
Melbourne Carlton	to Melbourne (from Carlton): Charlotte Wilson	to Carlton (from Melbourne): pick #42	
Collingwood Carlton	to Collingwood (from Carlton): Lauren Brazzale; pick #38; pick #89	to Carlton (from Collingwood): Amelia Velardo; pick #73	
Hawthorn Richmond	to Hawthorn (from Richmond): pick #18	to Richmond (from Hawthorn): pick #30; pick #33	
Richmond Collingwood	to Richmond (from Collingwood): pick #25; pick #38	to Collingwood (from Richmond): pick #30; pick #33	
Richmond Carlton	to Richmond (from Carlton): Grace Egan	to Carlton (from Richmond): pick #25	
Sydney Greater Western Sydney	to Sydney (from Greater Western Sydney): Ally Morphett	to Greater Western Sydney (from Sydney): pick #29	
Carlton Geelong	to Carlton (from Geelong): Phoebe McWilliams; pick #17	to Geelong (from Carlton): pick #21; pick #42	
Collingwood Geelong	to Collingwood (from Geelong): Olivia Barber	to Geelong (from Collingwood): pick #33	
Richmond Greater Western Sydney	to Richmond (from Greater Western Sydney): Libby Graham	to Greater Western Sydney (from Richmond): pick #68	
St Kilda Greater Western Sydney	to St Kilda (from Greater Western Sydney): Erin McKinnon; pick #54	to Greater Western Sydney (from St Kilda): pick #37	
Port Adelaide Gold Coast	to Port Adelaide (from Gold Coast): Cheyenne Hammond; Brittany Perry; Kate Surman; Jacqui Yorston	to Gold Coast (from Port Adelaide): pick #34; pick #81	
Melbourne Hawthorn	to Melbourne (from Hawthorn): pick #45; pick #80	to Hawthorn (from Melbourne): pick #51; pick #59	
Hawthorn Richmond	to Hawthorn (from Richmond): pick #52	to Richmond (from Hawthorn): pick #59; pick #62	
Greater Western Sydney Western Bulldogs	to Greater Western Sydney (from Western Bulldogs): Isabel Huntington	to Western Bulldogs (from Greater Western Sydney): pick #29; pick #37	
Western Bulldogs Geelong	to Western Bulldogs (from Geelong): Millie Brown; pick 21	to Geelong (from Western Bulldogs): pick #24; pick #56	
Geelong West Coast	to Geelong (from West Coast): Mikayla Bowen	to West Coast (from Geelong): pick #24	
St Kilda West Coast	to St Kilda (from West Coast): Grace Kelly	to West Coast (from St. Kilda): pick #54	
Gold Coast Carlton	to Gold Coast (from Carlton): Courtney Jones	to Carlton (from Gold Coast): pick #49	
Hawthorn North Melbourne	to Hawthorn (from North Melbourne): Kaitlyn Ashmore	to North Melbourne (from Hawthorn): pick #51	
Carlton Hawthorn	to Carlton (from Hawthorn): pick #18	to Hawthorn (from Carlton): pick #25; pick #28; pick #55	
Western Bulldogs North Melbourne	to Western Bulldogs (from North Melbourne): Daisy Bateman; pick #74	to North Melbourne (from Western Bulldogs): pick #72; pick #90	
Fremantle Adelaide	to Fremantle (from Adelaide): Nikki Gore; pick #60	to Adelaide (from Fremantle): pick #40; pick #75	
Adelaide West Coast	to Adelaide (from West Coast): Niamh Kelly; Amber Ward	to West Coast (from Adelaide): Jess Sedunary; pick #43	
Hawthorn North Melbourne	to Hawthorn (from North Melbourne): pick #26; pick #72	to North Melbourne (from Hawthorn): pick #28; pick #52; pick #55	

=== Delisted free agency ===
The delisted free agency period closed on 25 June 2021.

Table of free agency signings
Date	Player	Former club	New club	Ref
7 June	Clara Fitzpatrick	St Kilda	St Kilda	
9 June	Kate McCarthy	St Kilda	Hawthorn	
9 June	Rhiannon Watt	St Kilda	Melbourne	
10 June	Tahlia Meyer	St Kilda	Gold Coast	
10 June	Alana Barba	Gold Coast	Essendon	
11 June	Jess Wuetschner	Brisbane	Essendon	
13 June	Sarah Sansonetti	Richmond	Collingwood	
15 June	Jemima Woods	Western Bulldogs	Richmond	
15 June	Akec Makur Chuot	Richmond	Hawthorn	
16 June	Alana Woodward	St Kilda	Sydney	

=== Rookie signings ===
In the absence of a rookie draft, each club was permitted to sign players that had not played Australian rules football within the previous three years or been involved in an AFLW high-performance program.

Table of rookie signings
Club	Player	Recruited from	Other/former sport	Ref
Carlton	Taylor Ortlepp	Rockingham Flames	Basketball	
Collingwood	Emily Smith	Sydney Thunder	Cricket	
Fremantle	Orlagh Lally	Meath GAA	Gaelic football	
Geelong	Samantha Gooden	Glenelg	Netball	
Hawthorn	Aine McDonagh	Galway GAA	Gaelic football	
Melbourne	Blaithin Mackin	Armagh GAA	Gaelic football	
North Melbourne	Vikki Wall	Meath GAA	Gaelic football	
North Melbourne	Erika O'Shea	Cork GAA	Gaelic football	
North Melbourne	Zoe Savarirayan	Bulleen Lions	Soccer	
Port Adelaide	Olivia Levicki	South Adelaide	Basketball	
Richmond	Saraid Taylor	Southside Flyers	Basketball	
Sydney	Tiarne Cavanagh	Southern Districts	Rugby Union	

=== Inactive players ===
Table of inactive players
Club	Player	Reason	Ref
Adelaide	Deni Varnhagen	Pregnancy	
Adelaide	Dayna Cox	Work	
Adelaide	Jasmyn Hewett	Work	
Brisbane	Gabby Collingwood	Knee	
Brisbane	Maggie Harmer	Mental health	
Brisbane	Bella Smith	Knee	
Collingwood	Brittany Bonnici	Knee	
Collingwood	Brianna Davey	Knee	
Essendon	Georgia Nanscawen	Knee	
Essendon	Eloise Ashley-Cooper	Foot	
Essendon	Jorja Borg	Foot	
Fremantle	Mikayla Morrison	Knee	
Fremantle	Ashley Sharp	Pregnancy	
Geelong	Samantha Gooden	Knee	
Geelong	Maddy McMahon	Personal break	
Gold Coast	Maddison Levi	Rugby	
Gold Coast	Teagan Levi	Rugby	
Gold Coast	Jade Pregelj	Knee	
Gold Coast	Alana Gee	Back	
Greater Western Sydney	Jessica Allan	Army	
Greater Western Sydney	Emily Goodsir	Pregnancy	
Greater Western Sydney	Isadora McLeay	Knee	
Greater Western Sydney	Isabel Huntington	Knee	
Greater Western Sydney	Fleur Davies	Shoulder	
Melbourne	Rhiannon Watt	Knee	
Melbourne	Gabby Colvin	Knee	
Melbourne	Eliza McNamara	Back	
North Melbourne	Grace Campbell	Knee	
Richmond	Hannah Burchell	Knee	
Richmond	Harriet Cordner	Knee	
Richmond	Charley Ryan	Knee	
St Kilda	Leah Cutting	Work	
Sydney	Alice Mitchell	Knee	
Sydney	Montana Beruldsen	Knee	
West Coast	Evie Gooch	Wrist	
West Coast	Lauren Wakfer	Knee	
West Coast	Shanae Davison	Knee	
Western Bulldogs	Aurora Smith	Knee	

== Draft ==
The 2022 AFL Women's draft took place on Wednesday, 29 June. The indicative draft order was updated following the sign and trade period:

Table of draft selections
Rd.	Pick	Player	Club	Recruited from		Notes
Rd.	Pick	Player	Club	Club	League	Notes
1	1	Montana Ham	Sydney	Western Jets	NAB League Girls	
1	2	Jasmine Fleming	Hawthorn	Oakleigh Chargers	NAB League Girls	
1	3	Hannah Ewings	Port Adelaide	North Adelaide	SANFLW	
1	4	Amber Clarke	Essendon	Dandenong Stingrays	NAB League Girls	
1	5	Sofia Hurley	Sydney	Sandringham Dragons	NAB League Girls	
1	6	Mackenzie Eardley	Hawthorn	Dandenong Stingrays	NAB League Girls	
1	7	Sarah Goodwin	Port Adelaide	Glenelg	SANFLW	
1	8	Paige Scott	Essendon	Greater Western Victoria Rebels	NAB League Girls	
1	9	Charlotte Baskaran	Hawthorn	Western Jets	NAB League Girls	
1	10	Bridie Hipwell	Hawthorn	Sandringham Dragons	NAB League Girls	
1	11	Cynthia Hamilton	Sydney	Queanbeyan	AFL Canberra	
1	12	Montana Beruldsen	Sydney	Hawthorn	VFLW	
1	13	Alice Mitchell	Sydney	Gunnedah & District	AFL North West	
1	14	Ella Roberts	West Coast	Peel Thunder	WAFLW	
1	15	Lauren Wakfer	West Coast	South Fremantle	WAFLW	
1	16	J'Noemi Anderson	St Kilda	Sandringham Dragons	NAB League Girls	
1	17	Keeley Skepper	Carlton	Murray Bushrangers	NAB League Girls	←Geelong
1	18	Mia Austin	Carlton	Eastern Ranges	NAB League Girls	←Hawthorn←Richmond
1	19	Alana Gee	Gold Coast	Southport	QAFLW	
1	20	Zarlie Goldsworthy	Greater Western Sydney	Murray Bushrangers	NAB League Girls	
1	21	Rylie Wilcox	Western Bulldogs	Northern Knights	NAB League Girls	←Geelong←Carlton
1	22	Lucy Wales	Hawthorn	Casey Demons	VFLW	
1	23	Sachi Syme	Port Adelaide	Norwood	SANFLW	
1	24	Abbygail Bushby	West Coast	Swan Districts	WAFLW	←Geelong←Western Bulldogs
1	25	Emily Everist	Hawthorn	Bendigo Pioneers	NAB League Girls	←Carlton←Richmond←Collingwood
1	26	Laura Elliott	Hawthorn	Western Jets	NAB League Girls	←North Melbourne
1	27	Madeleine Scanlon	Fremantle	Claremont	WAFLW	
1	28	Taylah Gatt	North Melbourne	Dandenong Stingrays	NAB League Girls	←Hawthorn←Carlton←St Kilda
1	29	Keely Coyne	Western Bulldogs	Sandringham Dragons	NAB League Girls	←Greater Western Sydney←Sydney
1	30	Charlotte Taylor	Collingwood	Oakleigh Chargers	NAB League Girls	←Richmond←Hawthorn
1	31	Ella Boag	Port Adelaide	Glenelg	SANFLW	
1	32	Stephanie Wales	Essendon	Casey Demons	VFLW	
1	33	Mia Skinner	Geelong	Geelong	VFLW	←Collingwood←Richmond←Hawthorn
1	34	Claire Ransom	Gold Coast	North Hobart	TSLW	←Port Adelaide
1	35	Mia Busch	Essendon	Eastern Ranges	NAB League Girls	
1	36	Zoe Wakfer	West Coast	South Fremantle	WAFLW	
2	37	Heidi Woodley	Western Bulldogs	Calder Cannons	NAB League Girls	←Greater Western Sydney←St Kilda
2	38	Charley Ryan	Richmond	Dandenong Stingrays	NAB League Girls	←Collingwood←Carlton
2	39	Sophia McCarthy	North Melbourne	Williamstown	VFLW	
2	40	Keeley Kustermann	Adelaide	West Adelaide	SANFLW	←Fremantle
2	41	Ella Smith	Brisbane	Aspley	QAFLW	
2	42	Brooke Plummer	Geelong	Northern Knights	NAB League Girls	←Carlton←Melbourne
2	43	Emily Elkington	West Coast	Claremont	WAFLW	←Adelaide
2	44	Maeve Chaplin	Melbourne	Casey Demons	VFLW	←Hawthorn
2	45	Yasmin Duursma	Port Adelaide	Gippsland Power	NAB League Girls	
2	46	Mia Van Dyke	Essendon	Geelong Falcons	NAB League Girls	
2	47	Jaide Britton	West Coast	Peel Thunder	WAFLW	
2	48	Lily Goss	Carlton	Carlton	VFLW	←Gold Coast
3	49	Sammie Johnson	Melbourne	Casey Demons	VFLW	←West Coast
3	50	Charli Granville	North Melbourne	Hawthorn	VFLW	←Hawthorn←Melbourne←Geelong
3	51	Grace Matser	North Melbourne	Gippsland Power	NAB League Girls	←Hawthorn←Richmond
3	52	Jasmyn Smith	Gold Coast	Bond University	QAFLW	
3	53	Mikayla Western	West Coast	Claremont	WAFLW	←St Kilda←Greater Western Sydney
3	54	Cassidy Mailer	North Melbourne	Murray Bushrangers	NAB League Girls	←Hawthorn←Carlton
3	55	Abbey McDonald	Geelong	Calder Cannons	NAB League Girls	←Western Bulldogs
3	56	Charlotte Blair	Collingwood	Dandenong Stingrays	NAB League Girls	
3	57	Dee Heslop	Brisbane	Gold Coast	AFLW	
3	58	Eilish Sheerin	Richmond	Inner West Magpies	AFL Sydney	←Hawthorn←Melbourne
3	59	Tara Stribley	Fremantle	Swan Districts	WAFLW	←Adelaide
3	60	Katelyn Cox	Richmond	Hawthorn	VFLW	←Hawthorn
3	61	Amelie Borg	Port Adelaide	North Adelaide	SANFLW	
3	62	Amelia Radford	Essendon	Essendon	VFLW	
4	63	Hannah Stuart	St Kilda	Southern Saints	VFLW	
4	64	Fleur Davies	Greater Western Sydney	Southport	QAFLW	←Richmond
4	65	Passed	Gold Coast	—	—	
4	66	Meghan Gaffney	Greater Western Sydney	Tasmania Devils	NAB League Girls	
4	67	Jessica Jones	Carlton	North Melbourne	VFLW	
4	68	Brooke Vernon	Western Bulldogs	Carlton	AFLW	←North Melbourne
4	69	Kiera Mueller	Adelaide	Sturt	SANFLW	←Fremantle
4	70	Charlotte Mullins	Brisbane	Aspley	QAFLW	
4	71	McKenzie Dowrick	Adelaide	Adelaide	AFLW	
4	72	Georgia Gall	Melbourne	Euroa	Goulburn Valley FNL	←Hawthorn
4	73	Ashleigh van Loon	Essendon	Geelong	VFLW	
5	74	Deanna Jolliffe	St Kilda	Southern Saints	VFLW	
5	75	Madison Brazendale	Greater Western Sydney	Tasmania Devils	NAB League Girls	
5	76	Passed	Collingwood	—	—	←Carlton
5	77	Megan Kauffman	Fremantle	Wembley	Perth Football League	
5	78	Kiara Hillier	Brisbane	Maroochydore	QAFLW	
5	79	Passed	Melbourne	—	—	
5	80	Lily Johnson	Port Adelaide	West Adelaide	SANFLW	
6	81	Caitlin Matthews	St Kilda	Oakleigh Chargers	NAB League Girls	Father–daughter selection (Daughter of Dean Matthews)
6	82	Jodie Hicks	Greater Western Sydney	Macquarie University	AFL Sydney	
6	83	Amy Mullholland	Fremantle	Subiaco	WAFLW	
7	84	Cambridge McCormick	Greater Western Sydney	Eastlake	AFL Canberra	
7	85	Tahlia Read	Fremantle	Calder Cannons	NAB League Girls	
8	86	Tess Cattle	Greater Western Sydney	Ainslie	AFL Canberra	
9	87	Passed	Greater Western Sydney	—	—	

=== Free agency and replacement signings ===
Where players were moved to the inactive list after the draft had taken place, clubs were entitled to replace them.

Free agent or replacement signings
Club	Player	Reason	Former club	Former league	Ref
Adelaide	Jessica Waterhouse	Replacement (Hewett)	South Adelaide	SANFLW	
Brisbane	Ava Seton	Replacement (B. Smith)	University of Queensland	QAFLW	
Collingwood	Imogen Evans	Free agent	Bond University	QAFLW	
Essendon	Alex Morcom	Replacement (Nanscawen)	Essendon	VFLW	
Essendon	Lily-Rose Williamson	Replacement (Ashley-Cooper)	Gippsland Power	NAB League Girls	
Essendon	Megan Ryan	Replacement (Borg)	North Adelaide	SANFLW	
Geelong	Kalani Scoullar	Replacement (Gooden)	GWV Rebels	NAB League Girls	
Geelong	Melissa Bragg	Replacement (McMahon)	Geelong	VFLW	
Gold Coast	Ashlee Atkins	Free agent	East Fremantle	WAFLW	
Gold Coast	Kaylee Kimber	Replacement (Gee)	Southport	QAFLW	
Greater Western Sydney	Zara Hamilton	Free agent	Murray Bushrangers	NAB League Girls	
Greater Western Sydney	Grace Hill	Replacement (Davies)	UTS	AFL Sydney	
Melbourne	Sabreena Duffy	Free agent	Fremantle	AFLW	
Melbourne	Ella Little	Replacement (McNamara)	Woodville-West Torrens	SANFLW	
North Melbourne	Hannah Bowey	Replacement (Campbell)	Collingwood	VFLW	
Richmond	Amelia Peck	Replacement (Ryan)	Southern Saints	VFLW	
St Kilda	Simone Nalder	Replacement (Cutting)	Essendon	VFLW	
Sydney	Genevieve Lawson Tavan	Replacement (Mitchell)	Darebin	VFLW	
Sydney	Kate Reynolds	Replacement (Beruldsen)	North Shore Bombers	AFL Sydney	
West Coast	Eleanor Hartill	Replacement (L. Wakfer)	Collegians	Perth Football League	
West Coast	Ashleigh Gomes	Replacement (Davison)	East Fremantle	WAFLW	

=== Elevated train-on players ===
When 24 or fewer players were available for selection during the season, clubs were permitted to elevate train-on players to their squads, where they would be available for selection in AFLW games. This section lists elevations which occurred during 2022 season 7.

Elevated train-on players
Date	Club	Player	Ref
21 September	Carlton	Christina Bernardi	
14 October	Fremantle	Madizen Wilkins	

== See also ==
- 2022 AFL draft
