= 2020 AFL Women's draft =

Eighth women's draft organised by the Australian Football League

General information
- Date: 6 October 2020
- Time: 7:00pm AEST
- Sponsored by: NAB

Overview
- League: AFL Women's
- First selection: Ellie McKenzie (Richmond)

The 2020 AFL Women's draft consists of the various periods when the 14 clubs in the AFL Women's competition can recruit players prior to the competition's 2021 season.

== Signing and trading period ==
A significantly delayed trade period was announced to begin from 3 August and conclude on 12 August, following the suspension of normal list management responsibilities due to COVID-19 pandemic. Concurrently, clubs will be permitted to re-sign existing players and will have until 17 August to do so. Players can be signed for one or two year contracts.

=== Retirements and delistings ===
Table of player retirements and delistings
Date	Name	Club	Status	Ref
17 January	Ruth Wallace	Adelaide	Retired	
19 March	Melissa Hickey	Geelong	Retired	
20 March	Nicole Callinan	Western Bulldogs	Retired	
23 March	Emma Mackie	St Kilda	Retired	
25 March	Emma Grant	Collingwood	Retired	
25 March	Lauren Tesoriero	Richmond	Retired	
27 March	Laura Bailey	Richmond	Retired	
27 March	Jess Foley	Adelaide	Retired	
4 June	Eliza Hynes	Collingwood	Retired	
20 June	Mairéad Seoighe	North Melbourne	Delisted	
20 June	Chloe Haines	North Melbourne	Delisted	
20 June	Libby Haines	North Melbourne	Delisted	
20 June	Taylor Mesiti	North Melbourne	Retired	
15 July	Courtney Cramey	Adelaide	Retired	
17 July	Courtney Gum	Adelaide	Retired	
17 July	Sophie Li	Adelaide	Retired	
31 July	Talia Radan	West Coast	Retired	
1 August	Joanne Doonan	Carlton	Delisted	
1 August	Emerson Woods	Carlton	Delisted	
1 August	Katie Harrison	Carlton	Delisted	
1 August	Sharnie Whiting	Carlton	Delisted	
3 August	Georgia Gourlay	Collingwood	Delisted	
3 August	Machaelia Roberts	Collingwood	Retired	
5 August	Ainslie Kemp	Melbourne	Delisted	
7 August	Arianna Clarke	Brisbane	Retired	
7 August	Bri McFarlane	Brisbane	Delisted	
7 August	Hannah Hillman	Brisbane	Delisted	
11 August	Anna Teague	Geelong	Retired	
11 August	Cassie Blakeway	Geelong	Delisted	
11 August	Gemma Wright	Geelong	Delisted	
11 August	Emma Humphries	North Melbourne	Delisted	
12 August	Ella Wood	Richmond	Retired	
12 August	Nekaela Butler	Richmond	Delisted	
12 August	Ciara Fitzgerald	Richmond	Delisted	
12 August	Emma Horne	Richmond	Delisted	
12 August	Emily Bonser	West Coast	Retired	
12 August	Kate Bartlett	West Coast	Delisted	
12 August	Cassie Davidson	West Coast	Delisted	
12 August	Emily McGuire	West Coast	Delisted	
12 August	Danika Pisconeri	West Coast	Delisted	
12 August	Tarnee Tester	West Coast	Delisted	
12 August	Maisie Nankivell	Adelaide	Retired	
12 August	Nicole Campbell	Adelaide	Delisted	
12 August	Jaimi Tabb	Adelaide	Delisted	
12 August	Kate Flood	Fremantle	Retired	
12 August	Mia-Rae Clifford	Fremantle	Delisted	
12 August	Sarah Garstone	Fremantle	Delisted	
12 August	Lindal Rohde	Fremantle	Delisted	
12 August	Courteney Munn	St Kilda	Retired	
12 August	Sammie Johnson	St Kilda	Delisted	
12 August	Melissa Kuys	St Kilda	Delisted	
12 August	Kelly O'Neill	St Kilda	Delisted	
14 August	Georgia Breward	Gold Coast	Delisted	
14 August	Alexia Hamilton	Gold Coast	Delisted	
14 August	Maddy Roberts	Gold Coast	Retired	
14 August	Tayla Thorn	Gold Coast	Delisted	
14 August	Kitara Whap-Farrar	Gold Coast	Delisted	
16 August	Kaila Bentvelzen	Collingwood	Retired	
17 August	Ellie Brush	Greater Western Sydney	Retired	
17 August	Ingrid Nielsen	Greater Western Sydney	Retired	
17 August	Maggie Gorham	Greater Western Sydney	Retired	
3 October	Tiarna Ernst	Gold Coast	Retired	
10 October	Lucy Bellinger	Brisbane	Delisted	

=== Trades ===
Table of trades
Clubs involved	Trade		Ref
Carlton Richmond	to Carlton (from Richmond): pick #15	to Richmond (from Carlton): Sarah Hosking	
North Melbourne Richmond	to North Melbourne (from Richmond): Grace Campbell	to Richmond (from North Melbourne): pick #43	
Collingwood North Melbourne	to Collingwood (from North Melbourne): Abbey Green	to North Melbourne (from Collingwood): pick #40	
Carlton St Kilda	to Carlton (from St Kilda): pick #36	to St Kilda (from Carlton): Jayde Van Dyk; pick #42	
Collingwood Richmond	to Collingwood (from Richmond): pick #31; pick #45	to Richmond (from Collingwood): Sarah D'Arcy; Sarah Dargan	
Melbourne Richmond	to Melbourne (from Richmond): pick #17	to Richmond (from Melbourne): Harriet Cordner	
Collingwood Melbourne	to Collingwood (from Melbourne): pick #11; Aliesha Newman	to Melbourne (from Collingwood): pick #10; pick #17	
West Coast Western Bulldogs	to West Coast (from Western Bulldogs): pick #3; Aisling McCarthy	to Western Bulldogs (from West Coast): pick #2; pick #16	
Adelaide St Kilda	to Adelaide (from St Kilda): Jess Sedunary; pick #42	to St Kilda (from Adelaide): pick #34	
North Melbourne St Kilda	to North Melbourne (from St Kilda): pick #22; pick #57	to St Kilda (from North Melbourne): pick #29; pick #40; pick #50	
Melbourne St Kilda	to Melbourne (from St Kilda): pick #29	to St Kilda (from Melbourne): Bianca Jakobsson	
Adelaide Greater Western Sydney	to Adelaide (from GWS Giants): Lisa Whiteley; pick #25	to Greater Western Sydney (from Adelaide): pick #20; pick #42	
Greater Western Sydney Melbourne	to Greater Western Sydney (from Melbourne): Katherine Smith; pick #29	to Melbourne (from GWS): pick #20; pick #39	
Carlton Melbourne	to Carlton (from Melbourne): Elise O'Dea; Maddy Guerin	to Melbourne (from Carlton): pick #15	
Collingwood Western Bulldogs	to Collingwood (from Western Bulldogs): pick #33	to Western Bulldogs (from Collingwood): Katie Lynch; pick #45	
Adelaide Western Bulldogs	to Adelaide (from Western Bulldogs): Hannah Munyard; pick #45	to Western Bulldogs (from Adelaide): pick #25	
Collingwood Western Bulldogs	to Collingwood (from Western Bulldogs): pick #19; pick #25	to Western Bulldogs (from Collingwood): pick #11	
Geelong Melbourne	to Geelong (from Melbourne): pick #10; pick #20; pick #27; pick #39	to Melbourne (from Geelong): pick #5; pick #35; pick #49	
Fremantle North Melbourne	to Fremantle (from North Melbourne): Jess Trend	to North Melbourne (from Fremantle): pick #44	
Fremantle West Coast	to Fremantle (from West Coast): pick #46	to West Coast (from Fremantle): Tayla Bresland	
Carlton Gold Coast	to Carlton (from Gold Coast): Charlotte Hammans	to Gold Coast (from Carlton): pick #56	
Brisbane Gold Coast	to Brisbane (from Gold Coast): Taylor Smith; pick #37; pick #51	to Gold Coast (from Brisbane): pick #24	
Gold Coast St Kilda	to Gold Coast (from St Kilda): Alison Drennan	to St Kilda (from Gold Coast): pick #24	

=== Delisted free agency ===
A delisted free agency period was held from August 17 to August 21, where unsigned players could move to other clubs.

Table of free agency signings
Date	Player	Former club	New club	Ref
17 August	Tarnee Tester	West Coast	Fremantle	

=== Rookie signings ===
In the absence of a rookie draft, each club was permitted to sign players that had not played Australian rules football within the previous three years or been involved in an AFLW high-performance program.

Table of rookie signings
Club	Player	Other/former sport	Ref
Brisbane	Courtney Hodder	Rugby union	
Collingwood	Imogen Purcell	Rowing	
Greater Western Sydney	Bríd Stack	Gaelic football	
Melbourne	Lauren Magee	Gaelic football	

=== Inactive players ===
Following final list lodgements, a number of players experienced changing circumstances that made them unable to participate in the 2021 season. Clubs were granted permission to place these players on an inactive list, gaining end of draft selections to replace them for the one season. Players on each club's inactive list ahead of the 2020 draft are listed below:

Table of inactive players
Club	Player	Reason	Ref
Brisbane	Gabby Collingwood	Injury (ACL)	
Brisbane	Sharni Webb	Pregnancy	
Fremantle	Jess Trend	Personal	
Fremantle	Leah Mascall	Injury (ACL)	
Geelong	Kate Darby	Pregnancy	
Gold Coast	Jasmyn Hewett	Work	
Gold Coast	Jacqui Yorston	Injury (ACL)	
Greater Western Sydney	Jacinda Barclay^{1}	Personal	
Greater Western Sydney	Yvonne Bonner	Visa	
North Melbourne	Elisha King	Injury	
Richmond	Holly Whitford	Injury (foot)	
St Kilda	Clara Fitzpatrick	Visa	
West Coast	Mhicca Carter	Injury (foot)	
West Coast	McKenzie Dowrick	Personal	
West Coast	Ashton Hill	Injury (ACL)	
Western Bulldogs	Katy Herron	Personal	

^{1} Barclay died on 12 October 2020.

== Richmond and West Coast concessions ==
After poor on-field performances and list builds in 2020, the AFL decided to award special assistance to both Richmond and West Coast. Each club was issued an end-of-first round draft selection which they were required to on-trade to another club in exchange for an established player. Clubs were permitted to package the picks (15 and 16 for Richmond and West Coast, respectively) but could not receive draft selections back in any trade.

== Draft ==
A draft was held on the night of 6 October 2020. Players will nominate for a single selection pool, aligned to a state or metropolitan region, with players only being eligible to be drafted by clubs operating in that region.

Table of draft selections
Rd.	Pick	Player	Club	Recruited from		Notes
Rd.	Pick	Player	Club	Club	League	Notes
1	1	Ellie McKenzie	Richmond	Northern Knights	NAB League	
1	2	Jess Fitzgerald	Western Bulldogs	Northern Knights	NAB League	←West Coast
1	3	Isabella Lewis	West Coast	Claremont	WAFLW	←Western Bulldogs
1	4	Teah Charlton	Adelaide	South Adelaide	SANFLW	
1	5	Alyssa Bannan	Melbourne	Northern Knights	NAB League	←Geelong
1	6	Tyanna Smith	St Kilda	Dandenong Stingrays	NAB League	
1	7	Annise Bradfield	Gold Coast	Bond University	QAFLW	
1	8	Zimmorlei Farquharson	Brisbane	Yeronga South Brisbane	QAFLW	
1	9	Tarni Evans	Greater Western Sydney	Queanbeyan	AFL Canberra	
1	10	Darcy Moloney	Geelong	Geelong Falcons	NAB League	←Melbourne←Collingwood
1	11	Sarah Hartwig	Western Bulldogs	Sandringham Dragons	NAB League	Collingwood←Melbourne
1	12	Mimi Hill	Carlton	Oakleigh Chargers	NAB League	
1	13	Isabella Eddey	North Melbourne	Sandringham Dragons	NAB League	
1	14	Sarah Verrier	Fremantle	Peel Thunder	WAFLW	
1	15	Eliza McNamara	Melbourne	Sandringham Dragons	NAB League	Carlton←Richmond, assistance pick with on-trade stipulation
1	16	Isabelle Pritchard	Western Bulldogs	Western Jets	NAB League	←West Coast, assistance pick with on-trade stipulation
2	17	Maggie Caris	Melbourne	GWV Rebels	NAB League	←Richmond←
2	18	Shanae Davison	West Coast	Swan Districts	WAFLW	
2	19	Tarni Brown	Collingwood	Eastern Ranges	NAB League	Father–daughter selection (Daughter of Gavin Brown) ←Western Bulldogs
2	20	Laura Gardiner	Geelong	Geelong Falcons	NAB League	←Adelaide
2	21	Olivia Barber	Geelong	Murray Bushrangers	NAB League	
2	22	Alice O'Loughlin	North Melbourne	Oakleigh Chargers	NAB League	←St Kilda
2	23	Sarah Perkins	Gold Coast	Hawthorn	VFLW	
2	24	Alice Burke	St Kilda	Sandringham Dragons	NAB League	Father–daughter selection (Daughter of Nathan Burke) ←Brisbane
2	25	Amelia Velardo	Collingwood	Western Jets	NAB League	←Greater Western Sydney
2	26	Joanna Lin	Collingwood	Oakleigh Chargers	NAB League	
2	27	Stephanie Williams	Geelong	Geelong Falcons	NAB League	←Melbourne
2	28	Daisy Walker	Carlton	Sandringham Dragons	NAB League	
2	29	Emily Pease	Greater Western Sydney	Belconnen	AFL Canberra	←North Melbourne
2	30	Mikayla Morrison	Fremantle	East Perth	WAFLW	
3	31	Abbi Moloney	Collingwood	Sandringham Dragons	NAB League	←Richmond
3	32	Julie-Anne Norrish	West Coast	East Fremantle	WAFLW	
3	33	Pass	Collingwood	—	—	
3	34	Renee Saulitis	St Kilda	GWV Rebels	NAB League	
3	35	Megan Fitzsimon	Melbourne	Gippsland Power	NAB League	
3	36	Winnie Laing	Carlton	Sandringham Dragons	NAB League	
3	37	Indy Tahau	Brisbane	South Adelaide	SANFLW	
3	38	Ruby Svarc	Brisbane	Essendon	VFLW	
3	39	Carly Remmos	Geelong	Geelong Falcons	NAB League	
3	40	Jacqui Vogt	St Kilda	Southern Saints	VFLW	
3	41	Mietta Kendall	Melbourne	Eastern Ranges	NAB League	
3	42	Libby Graham	Greater Western Sydney	Manly Warringah	Sydney AFL	
3	43	Tessa Lavey	Richmond	Dandenong Rangers	WNBL	←North Melbourne
3	44	Georgia Hammond	North Melbourne	Darebin Falcons	VFLW	
3	45	Rachelle Martin	Adelaide	West Adelaide	SANFLW	
4	46	Tiah Haynes	Fremantle	Subiaco	WAFLW	
4	47	Ashleigh Woodland	Adelaide	North Adelaide	SANFLW	
4	48	Isabella Simmons	Melbourne	GWV Rebels	NAB League	
4	49	Brooke Brown	North Melbourne	Launceston	TWFL	
4	50	Maddison Levi	Gold Coast	Bond University	QAFLW	
4	51	Pass	St Kilda	—	—	
5	52	Luka Lesosky-Hay	Richmond	Richmond	VFLW	
5	53	Andrea Gilmore	West Coast	Claremont	WAFLW	
5	54	Janet Baird	Gold Coast	Palmerston	NTFL	
5	55	Amy Smith	North Melbourne	Williamstown	VFLW	Father–daughter selection (Daughter of Shaun Smith)
6	56	Pass	West Coast	—	—	
6	57	Lucy Single	Gold Coast	Bond University	QAFLW	
7	58	Bess Keaney	Gold Coast	Southern Saints	VFLW	
8	59	Pass	West Coast	—	—	
8	60	Daisy D'Arcy	Gold Coast	Hermit Park	AFL Townsville	
9	61	Wallis Randell	Gold Coast	Bond University	QAFLW	

== Post-Draft ==
=== Undrafted free agency and replacement players ===
Due to the shortened season and small lists, replacement players are allowed for players that are placed on the inactive list, often due to injury, work commitments, personal issues or pregnancy. A final free agency period was opened after the conclusion of the draft, allowing clubs that passed on a draft selection to recruit from outside their state-based zone.

Table of replacement player signings
Date	Player	Free agent/Replacement	Former club	New club	Ref
7 October	Bella Smith	Free agent	Norwood (SANFLW)	Collingwood	
8 October	Tahlia Meyer	Free agent	South Adelaide (SANFLW)	St Kilda	
8 October	Lauren Gauci	Free agent	North Adelaide (SANFLW)	West Coast	
8 October	Amber Ward	Free agent	North Adelaide (SANFLW)	West Coast	
21 October	Maggie MacLachlan	Replacement (Trend)	Subiaco (WAFLW)	Fremantle	
26 November	Demi Liddle	Replacement (Hill)	Peel Thunder (WAFLW)	West Coast	
21 November	Jessica Matin	Replacement (Fitzpatrick)	Dandenong Stingrays (NAB League)	St Kilda	
17 December	Erin Todd	Replacement (Bonner)	Sydney Uni Flames (WNBL)	Greater Western Sydney	
17 December	Beth Pinchin	Replacement (Webb)	Coolangatta (QAFLW)	Brisbane	
21 December	Hannah McLaren	Replacement (Whitford)	Richmond (VFLW)	Richmond	
4 January	Annabel Strahan	Replacement (Herron)	Bendigo Pioneers (NAB League Girls)	Western Bulldogs	
13 January	Katelyn Cox	Replacement (Elisha King)	North Melbourne (VFLW)	North Melbourne	
22 January	Mikayla Hyde	Replacement (Mascall)	Swan Districts (WAFLW)	Fremantle	
25 January	Georgia Bevan	Replacement (Yorston)	Sturt (SANFLW)	Gold Coast	
25 January	Katelyn Pope	Replacement (Carter)	North Adelaide (SANFLW)	West Coast	
26 January	Paige Trudgeon	Replacement (Dalton)	Montmorency Football Club, (NFNL)	Carlton	
5 February	Rebecca Ott	Replacement (Xenos)	Southern Saints (VFLW)	St Kilda	

== See also ==
- 2020 AFL draft
