= List of AFL Women's debuts in 2022 =

List of AFL Women's debuts in 2022 may refer to:

- List of AFL Women's debuts in 2022 season 6, for the season that took place from January to April
- List of AFL Women's debuts in 2022 season 7, for the season that took place from August to November
