= Renee Saulitis =

AFLW footballer (born 2002)

Personal information
- Born: 14 August 2002 (age 24)
- Original team: Greater Western Victoria Rebels (NAB League Girls)
- Draft: No.34, 2020 AFL Women's draft
- Debut: 29 January 2021, St Kilda vs. Western Bulldogs, at Moorabbin Oval
- Height: 163 cm (5 ft 4 in)
- Position: Forward

Club information
- Current club: St Kilda
- Number: 13

Playing career^{1}
Years	Club	Games (Goals)
2021–	St Kilda	9 (0)
- ^{1} Playing statistics correct to the end of the S7 (2022) season.

Renee Saulitis (born 12 August 2002) is an Australian rules footballer playing for St Kilda in the AFL Women's (AFLW). She was recruited by St Kilda with the 34th pick of the 2020 AFL Women's draft.

== Junior football ==
Saulitis was born in Warrnambool in a family of Latvian descent. Saulitis played for many clubs over her junior career, including the Ararat Storm in the Deakin University Female Football League, the Lake Wendouree Football Club in the Ballarat Football League, and her school's team, Ballarat Grammar, where she boarded. She was selected in the AFL Women's Academy in November 2019, after playing for the Greater Western Victoria Rebels in the NAB League Girls for the 2019 season, where she averaged 6.8 disposals and 0.4 goals. She only played 2 games for the Rebels in the 2020 season due to the impact of the COVID-19 pandemic, but in those two games she performed well, averaging 12 disposals and a goal a game. She also played for Vic Country in the 2019 AFL Women's Under 18 Championships.

== AFLW career ==
Saulitis debuted in the opening round of the 2021 AFL Women's season, where the Saints clutched a 9-point win over the Western Bulldogs. On debut, Saulitis collected 7 disposals and 2 marks. After notching just 3 disposals the following round against North Melbourne, she was omitted from the side. She returned to the team in round 5, but was again omitted the following round.

=== Statistics ===
Statistics are correct to the end of the 2021 season.

Legend
G	Goals	K	Kicks	D	Disposals	T	Tackles
B	Behinds	H	Handballs	M	Marks

Season	Team	No.	Games	Totals							Averages (per game)							Votes
Season	Team	No.	Games	G	B	K	H	D	M	T	G	B	K	H	D	M	T	Votes
2021	St Kilda	13	3	0	0	10	6	16	4	1	0.0	0.1	3.3	2.0	5.3	1.3	0.3	0
Career			3	0	0	10	6	16	4	1	0.0	0.0	3.3	2.0	5.3	1.3	0.3	0
