= Montana Ham =

Australian rules footballer

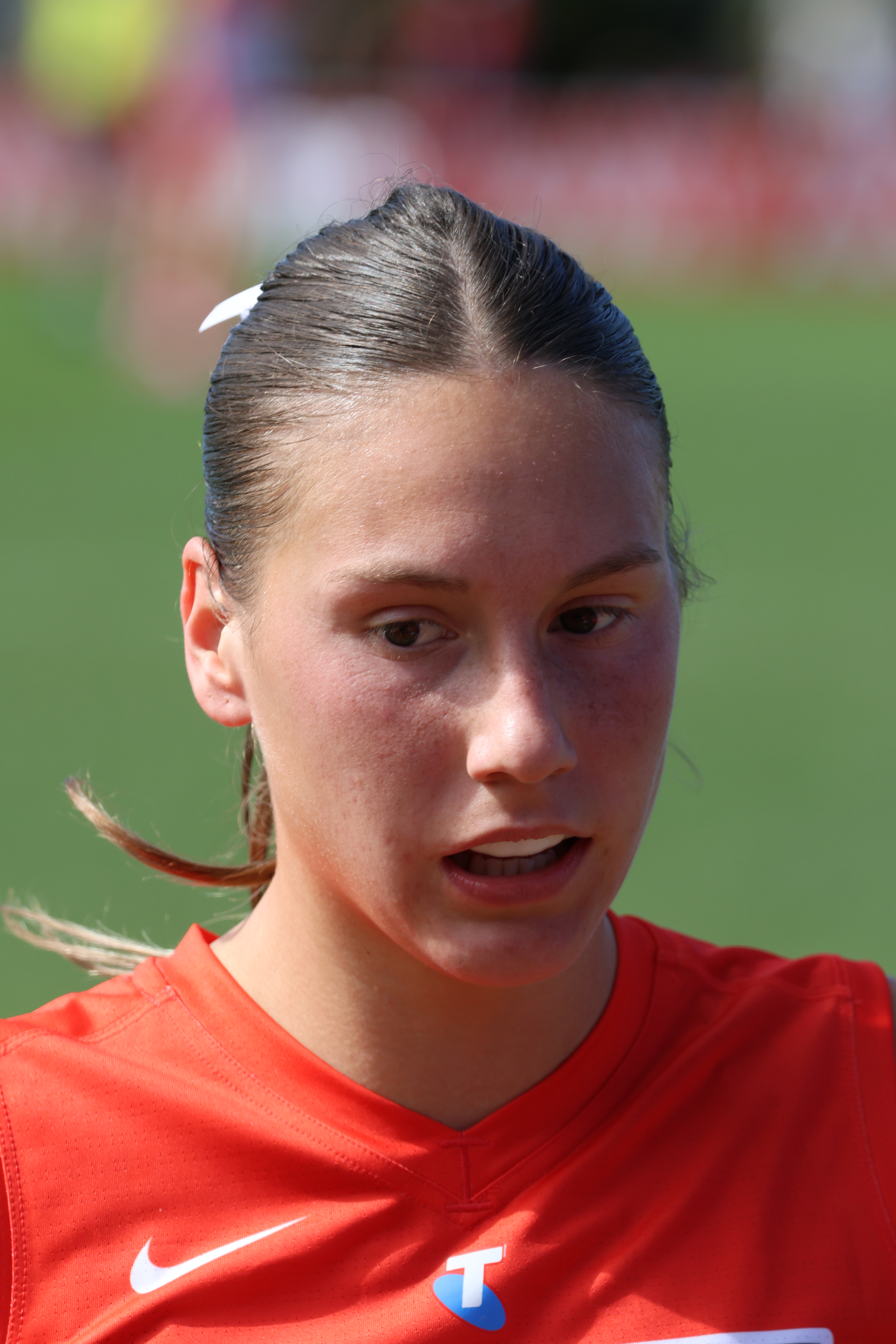
- Ham playing for Sydney in 2022

Personal information
- Full name: Montana Ham
- Born: 29 March 2004 (age 22)
- Original team: Western Jets (NAB League Girls)
- Draft: No. 1, 2022 national draft
- Debut: Round 1, S7, Sydney vs. St Kilda, at North Sydney Oval
- Height: 180 cm (5 ft 11 in)
- Position: Midfielder

Club information
- Current club: Sydney
- Number: 18

Playing career^{1}
Years	Club	Games (Goals)
S7 (2022)–	Sydney	16 (5)
- ^{1} Playing statistics correct to the end of the 2023 season.

Montana Ham is an Australian rules footballer playing for Sydney in the AFL Women's league. Ham was recruited by Sydney with the No.1 pick in the 2022 AFL Women's draft.

== Early life ==
Growing up in Hillside in Melbourne's west, Ham grew up playing football from a young age. After starting Auskick at the age of four, she went through the junior ranks playing at the Hillside Sharks. Despite playing multiple seasons of basketball and netball in her younger years, Ham chose to continue with football, and in 2013, Ham began playing with the Keilor Football Club in the Essendon District Football League, and at age thirteen she was scouted by NAB League club the Western Jets. Ham completed her school studies at Overnewton Anglican Community College, and made the State Schools Victoria representative teams multiple times. She also won multiple accolades as well as leadership roles in the under-15 state team. Basing her game off of Western Bulldogs midfielder Marcus Bontempelli, she developed her skills as tall, running midfielder. Ham played 24 games with the Western Jets in four seasons, her 2022 season seeing her average 24 disposals, 5 marks and 6 inside 50s in a dominant year. In particular, a 30 disposal, 13 inside 50 game against the Northern Knights was one of Ham's best games for the season. Ham also represented Vic Metro in the 2022 AFLW Under 18 Championships, where she was named the team MVP after an impressive 2022 season. Coming up to the 2022 draft, Ham nominated to be in the New South Wales pool instead of her home state of Victoria, citing 'lifestyle and future career reasons' as her primary motivation. As a result of this decision, Ham was quickly drafted with the opening pick of the 2022 AFL Women's draft by Sydney, who had obtained the first pick as a result of being a newly-formed expansion side.

== AFLW career ==
Ham debuted for the Swans in the opening round of the AFL Women's season seven. On debut, she collected 11 disposals and 8 tackles, and was named in Sydney's best performing players for the match. However, this came at a cost, as Ham suffered a minor knee strain which saw her kept out of the side for the next two rounds. She returned to the team in round 4, where she returned with a 20 disposal game in what was otherwise a 'resounding' loss to Port Adelaide, again being named in the team's best, and being awarded a rising star nomination as a result. Ham kicked her first AFLW goal in round 9, season 7 against Fremantle.

=== Statistics ===
Statistics are correct to the end of round 9, season 7.

Legend
G	Goals	K	Kicks	D	Disposals	T	Tackles
B	Behinds	H	Handballs	M	Marks

Season	Team	No.	Games	Totals							Averages (per game)							Votes
Season	Team	No.	Games	G	B	K	H	D	M	T	G	B	K	H	D	M	T	Votes
S7 (2022)	Sydney	18	7	1	1	42	44	86	10	31	0.0	0.2	7.0	7.3	14.3	1.7	5.2	1
Career			7	1	1	42	44	86	10	31	0.0	0.2	7.0	7.3	14.3	1.7	5.2	1

== Personal life ==
Ham's father, Roy, died in 2015. She received the guernsey number 18 to commemorate her father's birthday which was on May 18.
