= Megan Kauffman =

Australian rules footballer

Personal information
- Born: 22 March 1997 (age 29)
- Draft: No. 77, 2022 AFL Women's draft
- Debut: Round 1, 2022 (S7), Fremantle vs. Brisbane, at The Gabba
- Height: 165 cm (5 ft 5 in)
- Position: Forward

Club information
- Current club: Fremantle
- Number: 25

Playing career^{1}
Years	Club	Games (Goals)
2022 (S7)–	Fremantle	57 (15)
- ^{1} Playing statistics correct to the end of the 2026 season.

Megan Kauffman (born 21 March 1997) is an Australian rules footballer playing for the Fremantle Football Club in the AFL Women's (AFLW), and a former collegiate tennis player.

Kauffman was drafted by Fremantle with their third selection, and 77th overall in the 2022 AFL Women's draft. She was the first woman to be drafted directly from the amateur Wembley Football Club the Perth Football League.

Kauffman made her debut in the opening round of 2022 season 7.

After completing high school at Methodist Ladies' College, Kauffman attended Winthrop University in South Carolina on a tennis scholarship. She received All America status in 2018.
