= Sofia Hurley =

Australian rules footballer (born 2004)

Personal information
- Full name: Sofia Hurley
- Born: 30 January 2004 (age 22); Melbourne, Australia
- Original team: South Melbourne Districts/Sandringham Dragons
- Draft: No. 5, 2022 AFLW draft
- Height: 166 cm (5 ft 5 in)

Club information
- Current club: Sydney
- Number: 25

Playing career
Years	Club	Games (Goals)
2022 (S7)–	Sydney	23 (7)

Career highlights
- Sydney Club Champion (AFL Women's): 2024

Sofia Hurley (born 30 January 2004) is an Australian rules footballer who currently plays for the Sydney Swans in the AFL Women's (AFLW).

Hurley was born in Victoria and played for South Melbourne Districts as a junior player. She played for the Sandringham Dragons in the Talent League Girls under-19s competition.

Hurley was named as Sydney's AFLW Club Champion for the 2024 season.
