= Madi Scanlon =

Australian rules footballer

Personal information
- Full name: Madeleine Scanlon
- Born: 8 March 2001 (age 25)
- Original team: Claremont (WAFLW)
- Draft: No. 27, 2022 AFL Women's draft
- Debut: Round 1, 2022 (S7), Fremantle vs. Brisbane, at The Gabba
- Height: 172 cm (5 ft 8 in)
- Position: Defender

Club information
- Current club: Fremantle
- Number: 6

Playing career^{1}
Years	Club	Games (Goals)
2022 (S7)–	Fremantle	32 (0)
- ^{1} Playing statistics correct to the end of the 2026 season.

Madeleine Scanlon (born 8 March 2001) is an Australian rules footballer playing for the Fremantle Football Club in the AFL Women's (AFLW).

Scanlon was drafted by Fremantle with their first selection, and 27th overall in the 2022 AFL Women's draft.

In 2024, Scanlon was awarded the Jim Stynes Community Leadership Award, recognising her volunteer work in women's prisons as a sporting mentor.
