= Keeley Kustermann =

Australian rules footballer (born 2004)

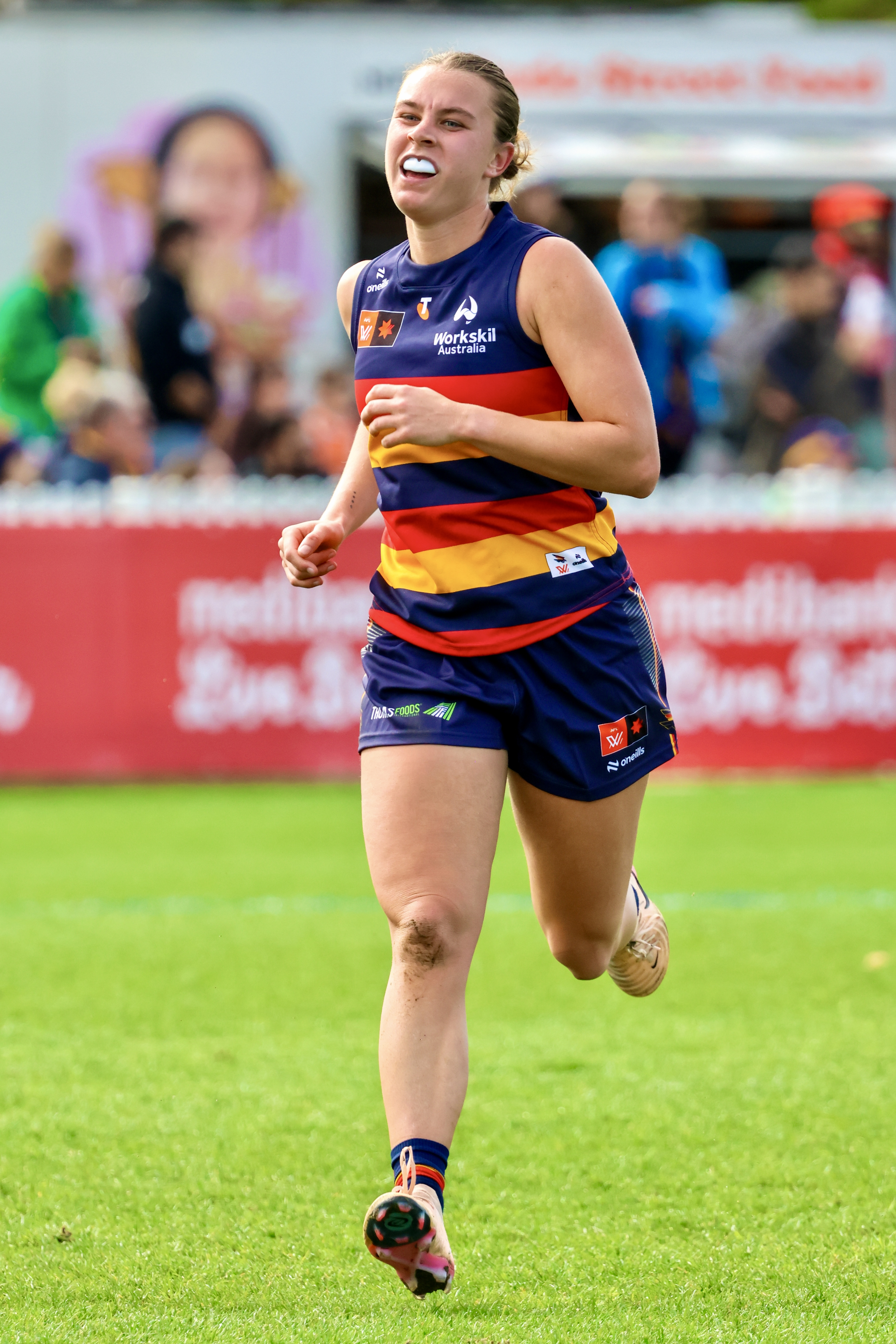
- Kustermann with Adelaide in 2026

Personal information
- Nickname: Keels
- Born: 17 April 2004 (age 22)
- Original team: West Adelaide (SANFLW)
- Draft: No. 40, 2022 AFL Women's draft
- Debut: Round 7, 2022 (S7), Adelaide vs. Fremantle, at Unley Oval
- Height: 166 cm (5 ft 5 in)
- Position: Utility

Club information
- Current club: Adelaide
- Number: 7

Playing career^{1}
Years	Club	Games (Goals)
2022–	Adelaide	27 (5)
- ^{1} Playing statistics correct to the end of 2025 season.

Keeley Kustermann (born 17 April 2004) is an Australian rules footballer who plays for the Adelaide Football Club in the AFL Women's (AFLW). She was recruited from West Adelaide Football Club in the SANFL Women's League and was selected by Adelaide with pick no. 40 in the 2022 AFL Women's draft.

== Early life and junior career ==
Kustermann began playing football in a mixed team with Mitchell Park before switching to a girls team with Goodwood Saints in the Adelaide Footy League. She then played for West Adelaide in the SANFL Women's League. She debuted in the SANFLW as a teenager, initially playing as a defender and a midfielder, winning selection in the SANFLW Team of the Year in 2022.

She is a graduate of Port Adelaide's Next Generation Academy program, and was selected to be part of the AFLW Academy in 2022.

In 2022, Kustermann captained the undefeated South Australia team in the AFL Women's Under-18 Championships, earning a place in the All-Australian side.

== AFLW career ==
Adelaide selected Kustermann with pick no. 40 in the 2022 draft. She made her AFLW debut for the Crows in round 7 of season 7. After playing just one game in each of her first two seasons, Kustermann established herself as a regular in Adelaide's side, playing in 37 matches since 2024.
