= Libby Graham =

Australian rules footballer (born 1997)

Personal information
- Full name: Libby Graham
- Born: 12 September 1997 (age 29)
- Original team: North Shore (AFL Sydney)
- Debut: Round 6, 2021, Greater Western Sydney vs. Brisbane, at Manuka Oval
- Height: 176 cm (5 ft 9 in)
- Position: Key Defender

Club information
- Current club: Richmond
- Number: 18

Playing career^{1}
Years	Club	Games (Goals)
2021–2022 (S6)	Greater Western Sydney	6 (0)
2022 (S7)–	Richmond	22 (0)
Total		28 (0)
- ^{1} Playing statistics correct to the end of the 2023 season.

Libby Graham (born 12 September 1997) is an Australian rules footballer playing for the Richmond Football Club in the AFL Women's (AFLW).

Graham first played Australian rules football in 2017, after moving to the sport from previously playing soccer. She first played Australian rules football for North Shore, before also playing at Macquarie University, and Manly Warringah in the AFL Sydney Women's Premier Division.

Graham was drafted by Greater Western Sydney with their third selection and forty second overall in the 2020 AFL Women's draft.

She made her debut against Brisbane at Manuka Oval in the sixth round of the 2021 season.

She was traded to Richmond by Greater Western Sydney at the 2022 AFL Women's draft in exchange for Draft pick 68.

She made her debut for Richmond against Geelong at GMHBA Stadium in the first round of 2022 season 7.

== Statistics ==
Statistics are correct to the end of 2022 (S7)

Legend
G	Goals	K	Kicks	D	Disposals	T	Tackles
B	Behinds	H	Handballs	M	Marks

Season	Team	No.	Games	Totals							Averages (per game)						
Season	Team	No.	Games	G	B	K	H	D	M	T	G	B	K	H	D	M	T
2021	Greater Western Sydney	37	3	0	0	13	6	19	6	4	0.0	0.0	4.3	2.0	6.3	2.0	1.3
2022 (S6)	Greater Western Sydney	37	3	0	0	10	11	21	5	8	0.0	0.0	3.3	3.7	7.0	1.7	2.7
2022 (S7)	Richmond	18	12	0	0	65	10	75	16	14	0.0	0.0	5.4	0.8	6.3	1.3	1.2
Career			12	0	0	88	27	115	27	26	0.0	0.0	4.9	1.5	6.4	1.5	1.4
