= Taylor Mesiti =

Australian rules footballer

Personal information
- Born: 22 March 1998 (age 28)
- Original team: VU Western Spurs
- Draft: 2018 expansion signing
- Debut: Round 6, 2019, North Melbourne vs. Collingwood, at Marvel Stadium
- Height: 175 cm (5 ft 9 in)
- Position: Defender/forward

Club information
- Current club: North Melbourne
- Number: 3

Playing career
Years	Club	Games (Goals)
2019–2020	North Melbourne	2 (0)

Taylor Mesiti (born 22 March 1998) is a retired Australian rules footballer who played for North Melbourne in the AFL Women's (AFLW). Originally a basketballer, she was one of North Melbourne's 2018 signings for their expansion into the AFLW after playing football for the VU Western Spurs, the St Kilda Sharks and the Casey Demons. She had also represented Vic Metro at the 2016 AFL Youth Girls National Championships.

She debuted for North Melbourne in round 6 of the 2019 season against Collingwood at Marvel Stadium. In June 2020, Mesiti decided to step away from the game.
