= Lauren Brazzale =

Australian rules footballer

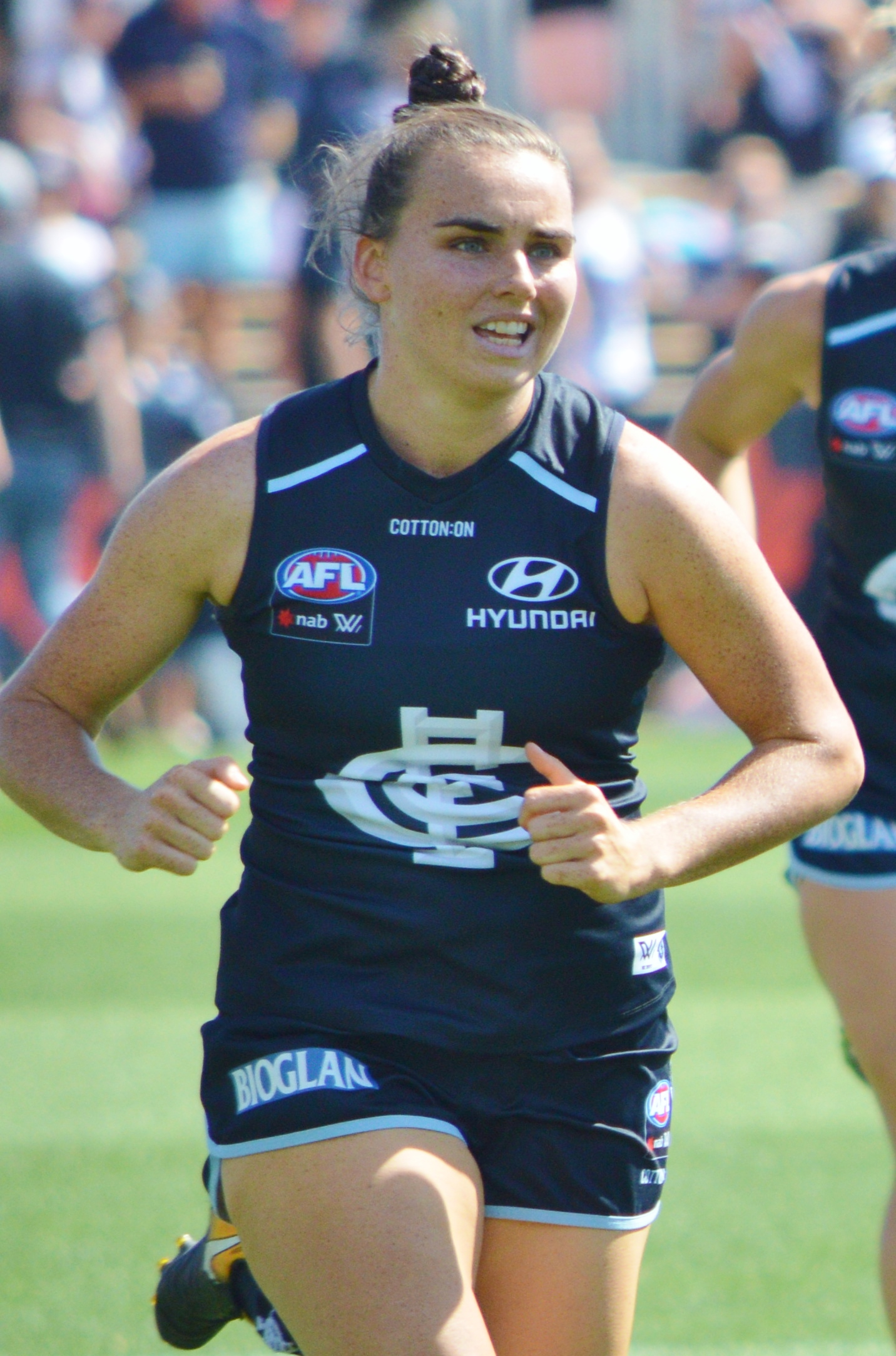
- Brazzale with Carlton in March 2019

Personal information
- Born: 5 November 1993 (age 32)
- Original team: Diamond Creek (VFL Women's)
- Draft: No. 62, 2016 AFL Women's draft
- Debut: Round 1, 2017, Carlton vs. Collingwood, at Ikon Park
- Height: 163 cm (5 ft 4 in)
- Position: Defender / Midfielder

Club information
- Current club: Richmond
- Number: 12

Playing career^{1}
Years	Club	Games (Goals)
2017–2022 (S6)	Carlton	41 (7)
2022 (S7)–2024	Collingwood	32 (0)
2025	Richmond	2 (0)
Total		75 (7)
- ^{1} Playing statistics correct to the end of the 2025 season.

Lauren Brazzale (born 5 November 1993) is an Australian rules footballer who plays for Richmond in the AFL Women's (AFLW) competition. She has previously played in the AFLW for Carlton and Collingwood.

== AFLW career ==
Brazzale was drafted by Carlton with the club's eighth selection and the sixty second overall in the 2016 AFL Women's draft. She made her debut in Round 1, 2017, in the club and the league's inaugural match at Ikon Park against Collingwood. Brazzale finished 2017 having played in all seven of Carlton's matches that season. She signed a 2-year contract with Carlton on 10 June 2021, after it was revealed the team had conducted a mass re-signing of 13 players.

In June 2022, Brazzale was traded to Collingwood in exchange for Amelia Velardo. In November 2024, Brazzale was delisted by Collingwood.

After impressing in the VFL Women's with Sandringham, Brazzale was signed by AFLW club Richmond.

== Statistics ==
Statistics are correct to the end of the 2024 season.

Legend
G	Goals	K	Kicks	D	Disposals	T	Tackles
B	Behinds	H	Handballs	M	Marks

Season	Team	No.	Games	Totals							Averages (per game)							Votes
Season	Team	No.	Games	G	B	K	H	D	M	T	G	B	K	H	D	M	T	Votes
2017	Carlton	12	7	1	0	39	7	46	8	15	0.1	0.0	5.6	1	6.6	1.1	2.1	0
2018	Carlton	12	5	0	3	25	6	31	3	11	0.0	0.6	5.0	1.2	6.2	0.6	2.2	0
2019	Carlton	12	8	0	4	68	15	83	13	18	0.0	0.5	8.5	1.9	10.4	1.6	2.3	0
2020	Carlton	12	7	2	2	57	11	68	17	17	0.3	0.4	8.1	1.6	9.7	2.4	2.4	0
2021	Carlton	12	9	4	1	72	13	85	25	20	0.4	0.1	8.0	1.4	9.4	2.8	2.2	0
2022 (S6)	Carlton	12	5	0	0	40	16	56	9	9	0.0	0.0	8.0	3.2	11.2	1.8	1.8	0
2022 (S7)	Collingwood	24	11	0	0	70	23	93	27	18	0.0	0.0	6.4	2.1	8.5	2.5	1.6	0
2023	Collingwood	24	10	0	0	74	27	101	18	26	0.0	0.0	7.4	2.7	10.1	1.8	2.6	2
2024	Collingwood	24	11	0	1	81	27	108	22	21	0.0	0.1	7.4	2.5	9.8	2.0	1.9	0
Career			73	7	11	526	145	671	142	155	0.1	0.2	7.2	2.0	9.2	1.9	2.1	2
