= Katelyn Cox =

Australian rules footballer (born 1998)

Personal information
- Full name: Katelyn Cox
- Born: 1 June 1998 (age 28)
- Original team: Hawthorn Football Club (VFLW)
- Draft: No. 60, 2022 National Draft
- Debut: Round 1, S7 (2022), Richmond vs. Geelong, at GMHBA Stadium
- Height: 159 cm (5 ft 3 in)
- Position: Half back

Club information
- Current club: Richmond
- Number: 17

Playing career^{1}
Years	Club	Games (Goals)
S7 (2022)–2025	Richmond	32 (1)
- ^{1} Playing statistics correct to the end of the 2023 season.

Katelyn Cox (born 1 June 1998) is an Australian rules footballer playing for the Richmond Football Club in the AFL Women's (AFLW). Cox was drafted by Richmond with their third selection and sixtieth overall in the 2022 AFL Women's draft. She made her debut against Geelong at GMHBA Stadium in the first round of AFL Women's season seven.

== Statistics ==
Statistics are correct to end S7 (2022)

Legend
G	Goals	K	Kicks	D	Disposals	T	Tackles
B	Behinds	H	Handballs	M	Marks

Season	Team	No.	Games	Totals							Averages (per game)						
Season	Team	No.	Games	G	B	K	H	D	M	T	G	B	K	H	D	M	T
S7 (2022)	Richmond	17	12	1	0	54	17	71	10	33	0.1	0.0	4.5	1.4	5.9	0.8	2.8
Career			12	1	0	54	17	71	10	33	0.1	0.0	4.5	1.4	5.9	0.8	2.8
