= Jacqui Vogt =

Australian rules footballer

- Born: 12 March 1994 (age 32); Gippsland, Victoria
- Height: 172 cm (5 ft 8 in)
Australian rules football career
Personal information
- Full name: Jacqueline Vogt
- Original team: Southern Saints (VFLW)
- Draft: No. 40, 2020 draft
- Debut: Round 1, 2021, St Kilda vs. Western Bulldogs, at Moorabbin Oval
- Position: Forward
Playing career^{1}
Years	Club	Games (Goals)
2020–2022 (S6)	St Kilda	17 (4)
2022 (S7)–2024	Essendon	24 (8)
Total		41 (12)
- ^{1} Playing statistics correct to the end of 2024.
Association football career
- Position: Defender
Youth career
- Traralgon City SC
- Churchill United SC
- Gippsland United FC
Senior career*
Years	Team	Apps	(Gls)
2012–2013	Melbourne Victory	5	(0)
- * Club domestic league appearances and goals as of 1 December 2012

Jacqueline Vogt (born 12 March 1994) is a retired soccer and Australian rules football player. She played soccer professionally for Melbourne Victory in the W-League and Australian rules football for St Kilda and Essendon in the AFL Women's (AFLW).

She most recently played for North Melbourne in the VFL Women's.

== Association football career ==
Growing up in Gippsland, Victoria, Vogt played for Traralgon City SC and Churchill United SC. She went on to represent Gippsland United FC and captain the club during her junior years.

At 18 years of age, Vogt signed a professional contract with Melbourne Victory in the W-League. She played five games for the club in 2012. Vogt was then invited to training camps with the Australia women's national under-20 soccer team, also known as the Young Matildas, in the hope to propel her career to the international level. However, she would rupture her anterior cruciate ligament while training for Melbourne Victory.

== Australian rules football career ==
=== St Kilda ===
Following an extended period absent from professional sport and time spent studying podiatry, Vogt joined the Southern Saints in the VFL Women's and played in the 2019 season. She was signed as a train-on player for the St Kilda Saints in their inaugural AFL Women's season in 2020, and joined their playing list for 2021 after being taken with pick 40 in the 2022 draft. Vogt made her debut in round 1, 2021, against the Western Bulldogs. She kicked a goal in her first match.

=== Essendon ===
Vogt signed with Essendon as part of the league's concessions to expansion clubs. She became a part of their inaugural leadership group and played in the club's first AFLW game. She finished fifth in the club's inaugural best and fairest award.

After being delisted by Essendon at the conclusion of the 2024 AFL Women's season, Vogt joined North Melbourne in the VFLW.
