= Dee Heslop =

Australian rules footballer

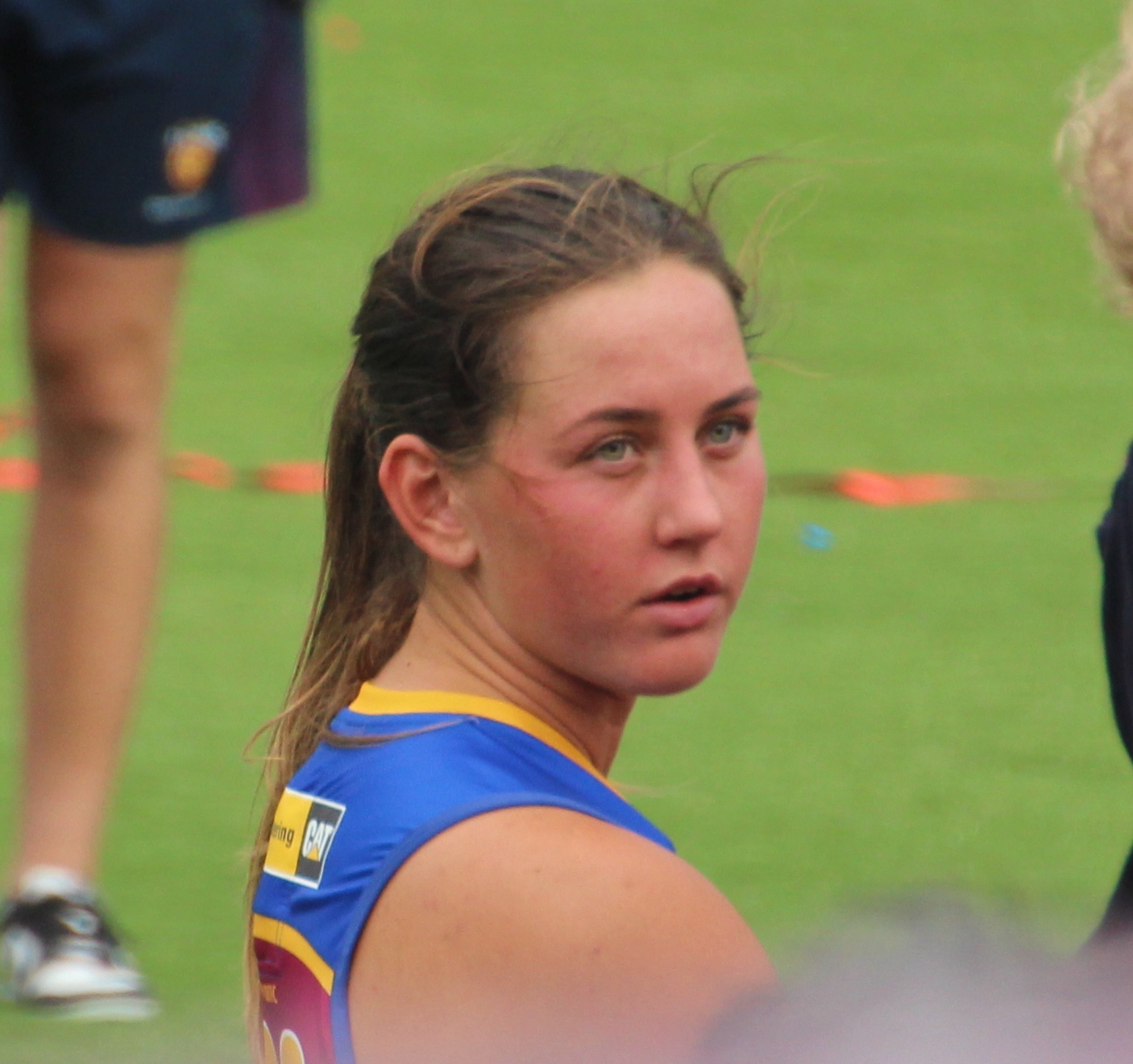
- Heslop after the 2022 season 7 Grand Final

Personal information
- Full name: Dion-Maree Heslop
- Born: 30 July 2001 (age 25); Auckland, New Zealand
- Original team: Yeronga (QAFLW)
- Draft: No. 69, 2019 AFL Women's draft
- Height: 167 cm (5 ft 6 in)
- Position: Midfielder

Playing career^{1}
Years	Club	Games (Goals)
2020–2022 (S6)	Gold Coast	23 (0)
2022 (S7)–2025	Brisbane	22 (0)
Total		45 (0)
- ^{1} Playing statistics correct to the end of the 2025 season.

Dion-Maree Heslop (born 30 July 2001) is an Australian rules footballer who has played for Gold Coast and Brisbane in the AFL Women's (AFLW).

== Early life ==
Heslop was born in Auckland, New Zealand and moved to the Gold Coast at 10 years of age. She attended Helensvale State High School throughout her upbringing and her first sporting interest was netball where she was a junior state representative for Queensland. She later tried Australian rules football for the Southport Sharks and was signed up to the Gold Coast Suns Academy and subsequently quit netball to pursue a career in the AFLW. She was selected for numerous junior football state representative teams and joined the top level Yeronga Devils in the lead up to her draft year.

== AFLW career ==
Heslop was drafted by Gold Coast with the 69th pick in the 2019 AFL Women's draft. She made her AFLW debut against Greater Western Sydney in round 1 of the 2020 AFL Women's season. In June 2022, Heslop was delisted by Gold Coast.

In June 2022, Heslop was drafted by Brisbane with the 57th pick. She played 22 games across four seasons before being delisted at the end of the 2025 season.

== Statistics ==
Legend
G	Goals	K	Kicks	D	Disposals	T	Tackles
B	Behinds	H	Handballs	M	Marks

Season	Team	No.	Games	Totals							Averages (per game)							Votes
Season	Team	No.	Games	G	B	K	H	D	M	T	G	B	K	H	D	M	T	Votes
2020	Gold Coast	25	7	0	0	27	5	32	4	31	0.0	0.0	3.9	0.7	4.6	0.6	4.4	0
2021	Gold Coast	25	9	0	0	37	18	55	9	17	0.0	0.0	4.1	2.0	6.1	1.0	1.9	0
2022 (S6)	Gold Coast	25	7	0	0	28	14	42	8	26	0.0	0.0	4.0	2.0	6.0	1.1	3.7	0
2022 (S7)	Brisbane	23	11	0	0	34	23	57	15	19	0.0	0.0	3.1	2.1	5.2	1.4	1.7	0
2023	Brisbane	23	10	0	0	33	9	42	16	19	0.0	0.0	3.3	0.9	4.2	1.6	1.9	0
2024	Brisbane	4	1	0	0	4	2	6	2	5	0.0	0.0	4.0	2.0	6.0	2.0	5.0	0
2025	Brisbane	4	0	—	—	—	—	—	—	—	—	—	—	—	—	—	—	0
Career			45	0	0	163	71	234	54	117	0.0	0.0	3.6	1.6	5.2	1.2	2.6	0
