= Ellyse Gamble =

Australian rules footballer

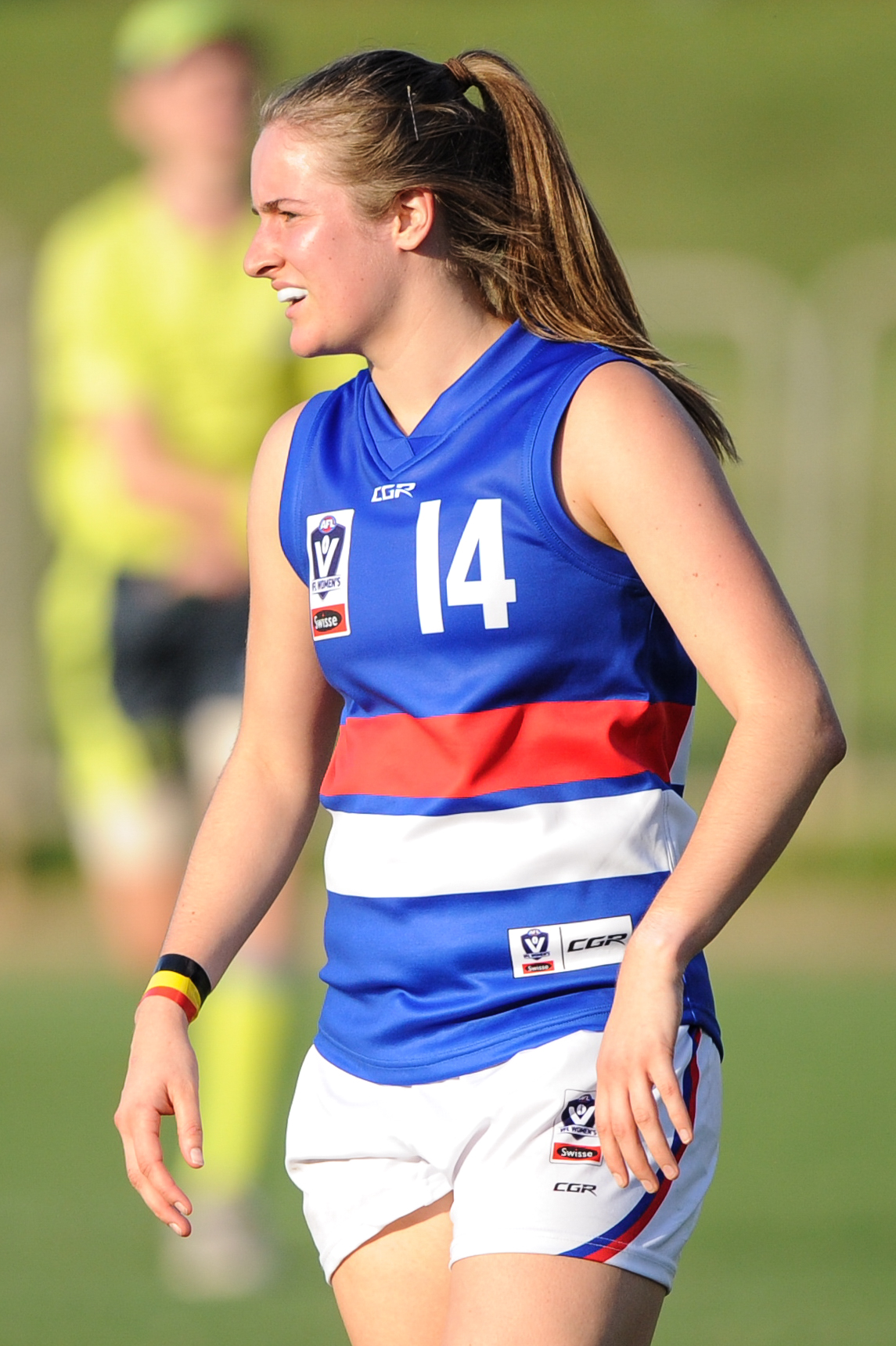
- Gamble in June 2018

Personal information
- Born: 16 September 1997 (age 29)
- Original team: Burnie Dockers (TSL)
- Draft: No. 69, 2016 AFL Women's draft
- Debut: Round 1, 2017, Western Bulldogs vs. Fremantle, at VU Whitten Oval
- Height: 180 cm (5 ft 11 in)
- Position: Defender

Playing career^{1}
Years	Club	Games (Goals)
2017–2022 (S6)	Western Bulldogs	24 (0)
2022 (S7)–2025	Essendon	39 (7)
Total		63 (7)
- ^{1} Playing statistics correct to the end of the 2025 season.

Ellyse Gamble (born 16 September 1997) is an Australian rules footballer who has played for the Western Bulldogs and Essendon in the AFL Women's.

Gamble was drafted by the Western Bulldogs with their ninth selection and sixty-ninth overall in the 2016 AFL Women's draft. She made her debut in the thirty-two point win against Fremantle at VU Whitten Oval in the opening round of the 2017 season. She played six matches in her debut season. It was revealed that Gamble had signed a contract extension with the club on 16 June 2021, after playing 8 out 9 possible games for the club that season. Gamble achieved selection in Champion Data's 2021 AFLW All-Star stats team, after averaging the best in the league for one-on-one loss rate in the 2021 AFL Women's season, with a percentage of just 10.5 percent.

In May 2022, Gamble joined expansion club Essendon. After 39 games with the club, she was delisted at the end of the 2025 season.

== Statistics ==
Legend
G	Goals	K	Kicks	D	Disposals	T	Tackles
B	Behinds	H	Handballs	M	Marks

Season	Team	No.	Games	Totals							Averages (per game)							Votes
Season	Team	No.	Games	G	B	K	H	D	M	T	G	B	K	H	D	M	T	Votes
2017	Western Bulldogs	14	6	0	1	10	12	22	5	9	0.0	0.2	1.7	2.0	3.7	0.8	1.5	0
2018	Western Bulldogs	14	0	–	–	–	–	–	–	–	–	–	–	–	–	–	–	0
2019	Western Bulldogs	14	3	0	0	8	3	11	4	6	0.0	0.0	2.7	1.0	3.7	1.3	2.0	0
2020	Western Bulldogs	14	4	0	0	16	7	23	7	7	0.0	0.0	4.0	1.8	5.8	1.8	1.8	0
2021	Western Bulldogs	14	8	0	0	20	21	41	6	15	0.0	0.0	2.5	2.6	5.1	0.8	1.9	0
2022 (S6)	Western Bulldogs	14	3	0	0	17	6	23	9	5	0.0	0.0	5.7	2.0	7.7	3.0	1.7	0
2022 (S7)	Essendon	14	6	0	0	28	5	33	6	13	0.0	0.0	4.7	0.8	5.5	1.0	2.2	0
2023	Essendon	14	11	1	0	62	31	93	21	14	0.1	0.0	5.6	2.8	8.5	1.9	1.3	0
2024	Essendon	14	10	6	2	36	30	66	17	18	0.6	0.2	3.6	3.0	6.6	1.7	1.8	0
2025	Essendon	14	12	0	0	55	23	78	15	16	0.0	0.0	4.6	1.9	6.5	1.3	1.3	0
Career			63	7	3	252	138	390	90	103	0.1	0.0	4.0	2.2	6.2	1.4	1.6	0
