= Kate Surman =

Australian rules footballer

Personal information
- Born: 28 October 1991 (age 35)
- Original team: Maroochydore (QAFLW)
- Debut: Round 1, 2020, Gold Coast vs. Greater Western Sydney, at Blacktown ISP Oval
- Height: 163 cm (5 ft 4 in)
- Position: Midfielder

Club information
- Current club: Geelong

Playing career^{1}
Years	Club	Games (Goals)
2020–2022 (S6)	Gold Coast	26 (9)
2022 (S7)	Port Adelaide	10 (2)
2023–	Geelong	13 (4)
Total		49 (15)
- ^{1} Playing statistics correct to the end of the 2023 season.

Kate Surman (born 28 October 1991) is an Australian rules footballer playing for Geelong in the AFL Women's (AFLW). She previously played for Gold Coast and Port Adelaide

Surman signed with Gold Coast during the first period of the 2019 expansion club signing period in July. She made her debut against Greater Western Sydney at Blacktown ISP Oval in the opening round of the 2020 season.

In June 2022, Surman was traded to Port Adelaide.

In March 2023, Surman was traded to Geelong in exchange for Maddy Keryk and pick #12.

== Statistics ==
Statistics are correct to the end of the 2023 AFL Women's season.

Legend
G	Goals	K	Kicks	D	Disposals	T	Tackles
B	Behinds	H	Handballs	M	Marks

Season	Team	No.	Games	Totals							Averages (per game)							Votes
Season	Team	No.	Games	G	B	K	H	D	M	T	G	B	K	H	D	M	T	Votes
2020	Gold Coast	26	7	3	3	52	44	96	14	36	0.4	0.4	7.4	6.3	13.7	2.0	5.1	4
2021	Gold Coast	26	9	2	0	76	61	134	18	31	0.2	0.0	8.4	6.8	15.2	2.0	3.4	0
2022 (S6)	Gold Coast	26	10	4	6	52	54	106	10	42	0.4	0.6	5.2	5.4	10.6	1.0	4.2	0
2022 (S7)	Port Adelaide	26	10	2	1	70	41	111	20	37	0.2	0.1	7.0	4.1	11.1	2.0	3.7	0
2023	Geelong	7	13	4	5	76	56	132	25	49	0.3	0.4	5.8	4.3	10.2	1.9	3.8	1
Career			49	15	15	326	256	582	87	195	0.3	0.3	6.7	5.2	11.9	1.8	4.0	5
