= Amelia Velardo =

Australian rules footballer

Personal information
- Born: 28 May 2002 (age 24)
- Original team: Western Jets (NAB League Girls)
- Draft: No. 25, 2020 AFLW draft
- Debut: Round 1, 2020, Collingwood vs. Carlton, at Ikon Park
- Height: 176 cm (5 ft 9 in)
- Position: Ruck/midfielder

Club information
- Current club: Carlton
- Number: 1

Playing career^{1}
| Years | Club | Games (Goals) |
| 2020–2022 (S6) | Collingwood | 11 (2) |
| 2022 (S7)– | Carlton | 21 (1) |
| Total | | 32 (3) |
- ^{1} Playing statistics correct to the end of the 2022 (S7) season.

Amelia Velardo (born 28 May 2002) is an Australian rules footballer playing for Carlton in the AFL Women's (AFLW). She has previously played for Collingwood.

As a junior, Velardo initially played basketball for the Keilor Thunder in the Big V competition. She switched to football in 2020, citing her lack of passion for basketball after having played the sport for so long. Velardo began playing for her local team, Keilor, alongside friends, and later joined the Western Jets in the NAB League Girls. She only managed to play three matches before the 2020 season was cancelled due to the COVID-19 pandemic, but was still selected to trial at the Victorian AFLW draft combine.

Despite her lack of football experience, Velardo was selected by Collingwood with pick 25 in the 2020 AFLW draft, the club's second selection. She made her AFLW debut in the opening round of the 2021 season against Carlton, donning the number 5 worn by club captains Nick Maxwell and Nathan Buckley.

In June 2022, Velardo was traded to Carlton in exchange for Lauren Brazzale.

Standing at 176 cm (5 ft 9 in), Velardo has been variously described as an undersized ruck or a midfielder, though she has admitted she is "yet to lock down a position". Collingwood trialled her as a half-forward during the 2021 pre-season.

== Statistics ==
Statistics are correct to the end of the 2024 (S9) season.

Legend
| G | Goals | K | Kicks | D | Disposals | T | Tackles |
| B | Behinds | H | Handballs | M | Marks |

| Season | Team | No. | Games | Totals | | | | | | | Averages (per game) | | | | | | |
| Season | Team | No. | Games | G | B | K | H | D | M | T | G | B | K | H | D | M | T |
|---|---|---|---|---|---|---|---|---|---|---|---|---|---|---|---|---|---|
| 2021 | Collingwood | 5 | 2 | 0 | 1 | 3 | 3 | 6 | 1 | 3 | 0.0 | 0.5 | 1.5 | 1.5 | 3.0 | 0.5 | 1.5 |
| 2022 (S6) | Collingwood | 5 | 9 | 2 | 1 | 48 | 36 | 84 | 22 | 16 | 0.2 | 0.1 | 5.3 | 4.0 | 9.3 | 2.4 | 1.8 |
| 2022 (S7) | Carlton | 1 | 8 | 0 | 1 | 35 | 36 | 71 | 12 | 21 | 0.0 | 0.1 | 4.4 | 4.5 | 8.9 | 1.5 | 2.6 |
| 2023 | Carlton | 1 | 8 | 0 | 1 | 70 | 47 | 117 | 9 | 26 | 0.0 | 0.1 | 7.0 | 4.7 | 11.7 | 0.9 | 2.6 |
| 2024 | Carlton | 1 | 3 | 1 | 0 | 10 | 6 | 16 | 5 | 5 | 0.3 | 0.0 | 3.3 | 2.0 | 5.3 | 1.7 | 1.7 |
| Career | | | 32 | 3 | 4 | 166 | 128 | 294 | 49 | 71 | 0.1 | 0.1 | 5.2 | 4.0 | 9.2 | 1.5 | 2.2 |
