= Olivia Barber =

Australian rules footballer

Personal information
- Born: 14 July 2002 (age 24); Balldale, New South Wales
- Original team: Murray Bushrangers (NAB League Girls)
- Draft: No.21, 2020 AFL Women's draft
- Debut: 6 February 2021, Geelong vs. Collingwood, at Victoria Park
- Height: 185 cm (6 ft 1 in)
- Position: Forward / Ruck

Playing career^{1}
| Years | Club | Games (Goals) |
| 2021–2022 (S6) | Geelong | 10 (3) |
| 2022 (S7)–2023 | Collingwood | 4 (2) |
| Total | | 14 (5) |
- ^{1} Playing statistics correct to the end of the 2023 season.

Olivia Barber (born 14 July 2002) is an Australian rules footballer who played for Geelong and Collingwood in the AFL Women's (AFLW) league.

== Early life ==
Barber was a representative for the New South Wales country team in both the under 16s and under 18s divisions. She played basketball for four years at state level, around the same time she was playing for Vic Country at under 16s level. Barber played for the Murray Bushrangers in the NAB League Girls in the 2019 and 2020 seasons. She kicked 7 goals from 6 games in the 2019 season, while she only kicked a singular goal in the 2020 season due to it be cancelled as a result of the COVID-19 pandemic. She had her best game for the 2019 season in the Bushrangers' round two 42 point win over Queensland, where she kicked 4 goals and was named in the team's best. She was named as an All-Australian in the 2019 AFL Women's Under 18 Championships as a 17 year old, after kicking 5 goals from 3 games.

== AFLW career ==
Barber was recruited by Geelong with the 21st pick in the 2020 AFL Women's draft. She debuted in the team's 29 point loss to Collingwood. On debut, she kicked her first career goal in the opening 30 seconds of the game. Barber would go on to play every possible game for the season, with the exception of round 5. Barber injured her knee in round 12 of the VFL Women's season, but avoided surgery.

In June 2022, Barber was traded to Collingwood in exchange for pick #33. In December 2023, Collingwood announced they won't be offering her a contract for the 2024 AFL Women's season.

== Statistics ==
Statistics are correct to the end of the 2023 season.

Legend
| G | Goals | K | Kicks | D | Disposals | T | Tackles |
| B | Behinds | H | Handballs | M | Marks | H/O | Hit-outs |

| Season | Team | No. | Games | Totals | | | | | | | | Averages (per game) | | | | | | | |
| Season | Team | No. | Games | G | B | K | H | D | M | T | H/O | G | B | K | H | D | M | T | H/O |
|---|---|---|---|---|---|---|---|---|---|---|---|---|---|---|---|---|---|---|---|
| 2021 | Geelong | 15 | 7 | 3 | 1 | 22 | 24 | 46 | 10 | 15 | 18 | 0.4 | 0.1 | 3.1 | 3.4 | 6.6 | 1.4 | 2.1 | 2.6 |
| 2022 (S6) | Geelong | 15 | 3 | 0 | 0 | 12 | 8 | 20 | 5 | 4 | 19 | 0.0 | 0.0 | 4.0 | 2.7 | 6.7 | 1.7 | 1.3 | 6.3 |
| 2022 (S7) | Collingwood | 19 | 4 | 2 | 0 | 10 | 9 | 19 | 3 | 7 | 13 | 0.5 | 0.0 | 2.5 | 2.3 | 4.8 | 0.8 | 1.8 | 3.3 |
| 2023 | Collingwood | 19 | 0 | — | — | — | — | — | — | — | — | — | — | — | — | — | — | — | — |
| Career | | | 14 | 5 | 1 | 44 | 41 | 85 | 18 | 26 | 50 | 0.4 | 0.1 | 3.1 | 2.9 | 6.1 | 1.3 | 1.9 | 3.6 |
