= Elisha King =

Australian rules footballer

Personal information
- Born: 15 June 1999 (age 27); Melbourne
- Original team: North Cairns (AFL Cairns Women’s)
- Debut: Round 2, 2019, North Melbourne vs. Greater Western Sydney, at Drummoyne Oval
- Height: 164 cm (5 ft 5 in)
- Position: Utility

Playing career^{1}
Years	Club	Games (Goals)
2019–2022	North Melbourne	10 (3)
- ^{1} Playing statistics correct to the end of the 2022 season.

Career highlights
- Junior: U18 All-Australian: 2015

Elisha King (born 15 June 1999) is an Australian rules footballer who played for the North Melbourne Football Club in the AFL Women's competition (AFLW).

== Pre-AFLW ==
King was born in Melbourne, where they were introduced to Australian rules via Auskick Moving to Cairns with their family where they attended primary school she played junior club football with Cairns Hawks and North Cairns. Prior to being signed by North Melbourne, King had trained with Brisbane's squad and had been named Under 18 All-Australian at age 16 for her performances at the 2015 AFL Women's Under 18 Championships. It was revealed she signed on with the club for one more season on 17 June 2021, tying her to the club until the end of 2022.

== AFLW ==
King was signed by North Melbourne as a free agent during the expansion club signing period in 2018. She made her debut in a 25-point victory over Greater Western Sydney at Drummoyne Oval in round 2 of the 2019 season.

In June 2022, King was delisted by North Melbourne.
