= Ainslie Kemp =

Australian rules footballer

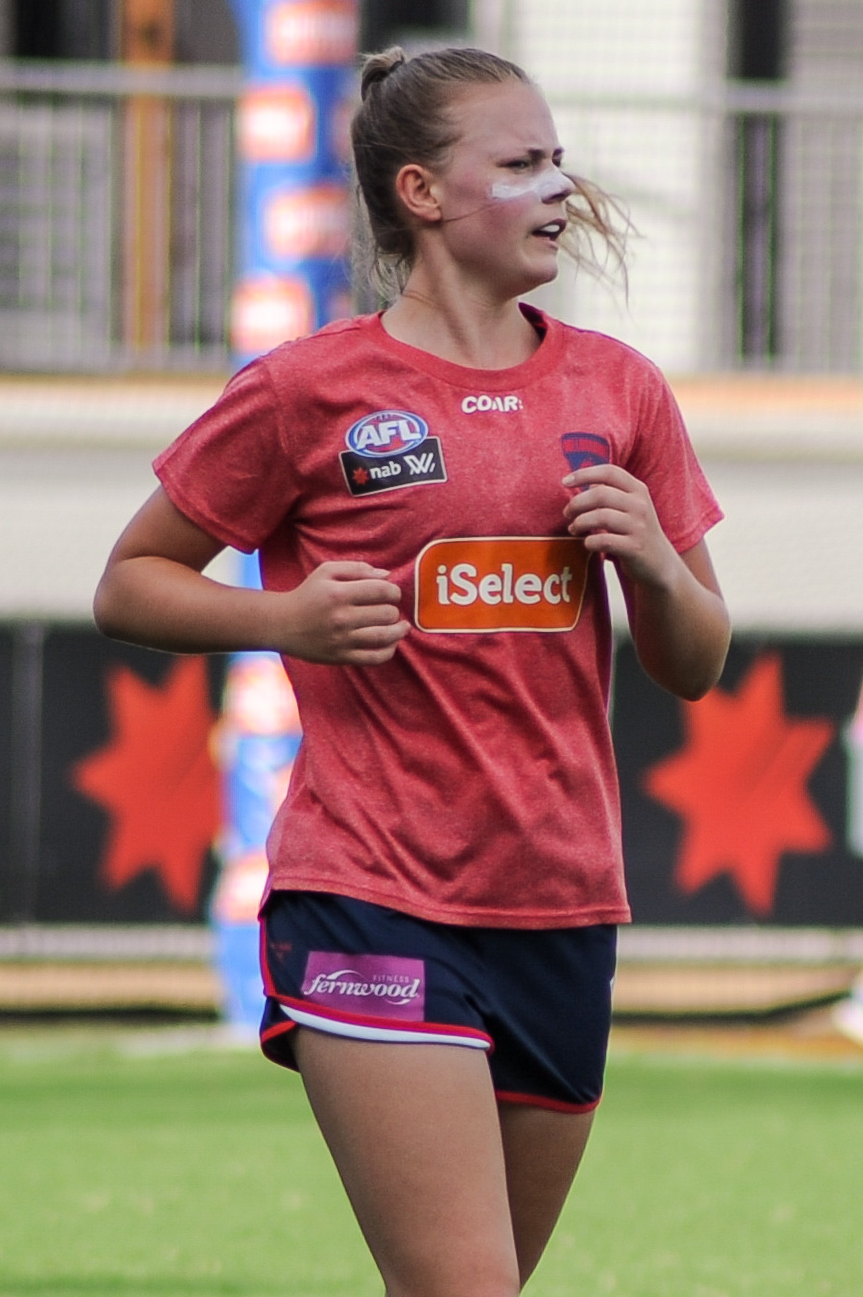
- Kemp warming-up for Melbourne in March 2017

Personal information
- Born: 18 March 1997 (age 29)
- Original team: VU Western Spurs (VFL Women's)
- Draft: No. 88, 2016 AFL Women's draft
- Debut: Round 4, 2017, Melbourne vs. Carlton, at Casey Fields
- Height: 170 cm (5 ft 7 in)
- Position: Forward

Playing career^{1}
| Years | Club | Games (Goals) |
| 2017–2020 | Melbourne | 10 (0) |
| 2022 (S7)–2025 | Hawthorn | 25 (0) |
| Total | | 35 (0) |
- ^{1} Playing statistics correct to the end of 2025.

Ainslie Kemp (born 18 March 1997) is an Australian rules footballer who most recently played for the Hawthorn Football Club in the AFL Women's (AFLW) competition. Kemp previously played with the Melbourne Football Club.

== AFLW career ==
Kemp was drafted by Melbourne with their eleventh selection and eighty-eighth overall in the 2016 AFL Women's draft. After initially being named as an emergency, she made her debut in the six point win against Carlton at Casey Fields in round four of the 2017 season. She played every match after her debut to finish with four games. Melbourne signed Kemp for the 2018 season during the trade period in May 2017. In August 2020, Kemp was delisted by Melbourne. In June 2022, Kemp joined expansion club Hawthorn.

== Statistics ==
Updated to the end of 2025.

Legend
| G | Goals | K | Kicks | D | Disposals | T | Tackles |
| B | Behinds | H | Handballs | M | Marks |

| Season | Team | No. | Games | Totals | | | | | | | Averages (per game) | | | | | | | Votes |
| Season | Team | No. | Games | G | B | K | H | D | M | T | G | B | K | H | D | M | T | Votes |
|---|---|---|---|---|---|---|---|---|---|---|---|---|---|---|---|---|---|---|
| 2017 | Melbourne | 36 | 4 | 0 | 2 | 21 | 9 | 30 | 8 | 8 | 0.0 | 0.5 | 5.3 | 2.3 | 7.3 | 2.0 | 2.0 | 0 |
| 2018 | Melbourne | 36 | 0 | — | — | — | — | — | — | — | — | — | — | — | — | — | — | 0 |
| 2019 | Melbourne | 36 | 4 | 0 | 0 | 10 | 12 | 22 | 5 | 5 | 0.0 | 0.0 | 2.5 | 3.0 | 5.5 | 1.3 | 1.3 | 0 |
| 2020 | Melbourne | 36 | 2 | 0 | 0 | 8 | 6 | 14 | 0 | 3 | 0.0 | 0.0 | 4.0 | 3.0 | 7.0 | 0.0 | 1.5 | 0 |
| S7 (2022) | Hawthorn | 16 | 7 | 0 | 0 | 48 | 9 | 57 | 12 | 8 | 0.0 | 0.0 | 6.9 | 1.3 | 8.1 | 1.7 | 1.1 | 0 |
| 2023 | Hawthorn | 16 | 4 | 0 | 0 | 15 | 4 | 19 | 3 | 4 | 0.0 | 0.0 | 3.8 | 1.0 | 4.8 | 0.8 | 1.0 | 0 |
| 2024 | Hawthorn | 16 | 13 | 0 | 0 | 106 | 24 | 130 | 45 | 12 | 0.0 | 0.0 | 8.2 | 1.8 | 10.0 | 3.5 | 0.9 | 5 |
| 2025 | Hawthorn | 16 | 1 | 0 | 1 | 12 | 3 | 15 | 3 | 0 | 0.0 | 1.0 | 12.0 | 3.0 | 15.0 | 3.0 | 0.0 | 0 |
| Career | | | 35 | 0 | 3 | 220 | 67 | 287 | 76 | 40 | 0.0 | 0.1 | 6.3 | 1.9 | 8.2 | 2.2 | 1.1 | 5 |

== Honours and achievements ==
Team

- McClelland Trophy (Hawthorn): 2024
