= Tahlia Meyer =

Australian rules footballer (born 1995)

Personal information
- Born: 6 July 1995 (age 31)
- Original team: South Adelaide (SANFL Women's)
- Draft: Free Agency signing (2020)
- Debut: 29 January 2021, St Kilda vs. Western Bulldogs, at Moorabbin Oval
- Height: 165 cm (5 ft 5 in)
- Position: Midfielder

Club information
- Current club: Gold Coast
- Number: 34

Playing career^{1}
Years	Club	Games (Goals)
2021–2022	St Kilda	10 (0)
S7 (2022)–2023	Gold Coast	11 (2)
Total		21 (2)
- ^{1} Playing statistics correct to the end of the 2023 season.

Career highlights
- SANFLW Team of the Year (2020)

Tahlia Meyer (born 6 July 1995) is a former Australian rules footballer who played for the Gold Coast and St Kilda in the AFL Women's (AFLW). She was signed by St Kilda as an undrafted free agent selection in October 2020.

== Pre-AFLW career ==
Meyer began her footballing career with the Morphettville Park Football Club in the southern suburbs of Adelaide. After playing with the Norwood Football Club, she then played for the South Adelaide Football Club in the SANFL Women's League. After a breakout 2020 season, she was named in the SANFLW Team of the Year on the wing.

== AFLW career ==
Meyer debuted for St Kilda in the opening round of the 2021 AFL Women's season. On debut, Meyer collected just 6 disposals, and was omitted from the team for round 2. She was brought back into the team in round 4, and kept her place for the rest of the season. It was revealed that Meyer had signed on with the Saints for one year on 29 June 2021, tying her to the club until the end of the 2022 season. In May 2022, Meyer was delisted by St Kilda. In June 2022, Meyer was signed by Gold Coast as a delisted free agent.

== Statistics ==
Statistics are correct to the end of the 2021 season.

Legend
G	Goals	K	Kicks	D	Disposals	T	Tackles
B	Behinds	H	Handballs	M	Marks

Season	Team	No.	Games	Totals							Averages (per game)							Votes
Season	Team	No.	Games	G	B	K	H	D	M	T	G	B	K	H	D	M	T	Votes
2021	St Kilda	34	7	0	1	44	24	68	13	14	0.0	0.1	6.3	3.4	9.7	1.9	2.0	0
Career			7	0	1	44	24	68	13	14	0.0	0.1	6.3	3.4	9.7	1.9	2.0	0
