= Joanne Doonan =

Irish Gaelic and Australian rules footballer

Personal information
- Born: 4 July 1994 (age 32)
- Draft: 2019 rookie signing
- Debut: Round 1, 2020, Carlton vs. Richmond, at Ikon Park
- Height: 170 cm (5 ft 7 in)
- Position: Midfielder

Playing career^{1}
Years	Club	Games (Goals)
2020	Carlton	2 (0)
2022 (S7)–2023	Essendon	11 (2)
Total		13 (2)
- ^{1} Playing statistics correct to the end of 2022 season 7.

Joanne Doonan (born 4 July 1994) is an Irish Gaelic footballer and Australian rules footballer. She plays for Fermanagh in Gaelic football and has played for Carlton and Essendon in Australian rules.

== Gaelic football ==
=== Club ===
At club level, Doonan has played for and captained both Kinawley and Queen's University. On 9 March 2018, she helped Queen's University win the O'Connor Shield final, scoring a goal and being named Player of the Match. On 26 October 2019, she captained Kinawley in the Ulster Intermediate Ladies' Football Championship final against St Paul's; this was her last Gaelic match before leaving for Australia. In November 2019, she was named on the Gaelic Life Ulster Club All-Stars Ladies Team of the Year. Before moving back to Australia in 2022, Doonan captained her club Kinawley to an Ulster Intermediate title for the first time in the clubs history and receiving another Gaelic Life Ulster Club All-Star.

=== Inter-county ===
Doonan has played for Fermanagh in two All-Ireland Junior Ladies' Football Championship finals. In 2017, she scored the winning goal as Fermanagh claimed the All-Ireland Junior title by beating Derry after a replay. In 2019, she was selected as captain of the Fermanagh team. She helped her side achieve promotion and their first league title since 2007 with an NFL Division 4 final victory over Antrim in May, and lead them to another All-Ireland Junior final, which they lost to Louth in September.

== Australian rules football ==
Doonan signed with Carlton Football Club in the AFL Women's (AFLW) as a rookie during the 2019 rookie signing period in September. She made her debut against Richmond at Ikon Park in the opening round of the 2020 season. She left Carlton and returned to Ireland in March 2020 due to the COVID-19 pandemic.

She returned to Australia and played for Essendon's VFL Women's team. She was then signed by the club in May 2019 for their inaugural AFLW season. She played 11 games across two seasons before being delisted at the end of 2023.

== Honours ==
=== Gaelic football ===
Fermanagh

- All-Ireland Junior Ladies' Football Championship
  - Winners: 2017
  - Runner up: 2019
  - Winners: 2020
- Ladies' National Football League Division 4
  - Winners: 2019

Kinawley

- Ulster Intermediate
  - Winners: 2021

Queen's University

- O'Connor Shield
  - Winners: 2018
