= Jacqui Yorston =

Australian rules footballer

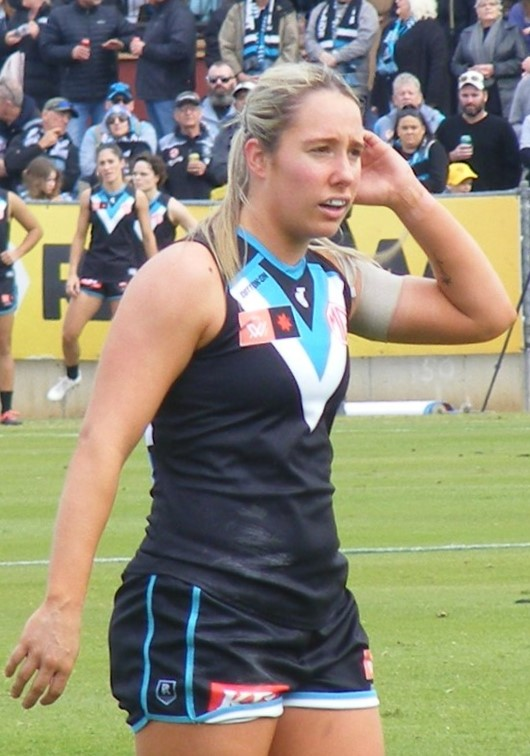

Personal information
- Full name: Jacqueline Yorston
- Born: 25 October 2000 (age 26)
- Original teams: Kedron District Juniors Football Club, Zillmere Football Club, Wilston Grange (QWAFL)
- Draft: Post-draft rookie compensation selection, 2018
- Debut: Round 4, 2019, Brisbane vs. Western Bulldogs, at Whitten Oval
- Height: 163 cm (5 ft 4 in)
- Position: Midfield

Club information
- Current club: Port Adelaide
- Number: 6

Playing career^{1}
Years	Club	Games (Goals)
2019	Brisbane	4 (0)
2020–2022	Gold Coast	15 (2)
S7 (2022)	Port Adelaide	10 (0)
Total		29 (2)
- ^{1} Playing statistics correct to the end of the S7 (2022) season.

Jacqueline Yorston (born 25 October 2000) is an Australian rules footballer playing for Port Adelaide in the AFL Women's competition (AFLW). She has previously played for Brisbane and Gold Coast.

She was playing for Yeronga South Brisbane in the AFL Queensland Women's League (QWAFL) when she was recruited by Brisbane as a post-draft rookie compensation selection in 2018.

She made her AFLW debut in the Lions' round 4 game against Western Bulldogs at Whitten Oval on 23 February 2019, and was awarded an AFLW Rising Star nomination after the round 6 game against Carlton at Princes Park.

Following the 2019 season, she joined the Gold Coast.

In June 2022, Yorston was traded to Port Adelaide.

Her partner is New Zealand Warriors NRL player Tanah Boyd.
