= Janet Baird =

Personal information
- Born: 12 January 2000 (age 26)
- Original teams: Palmerston (NTFL); NT Thunder (VFLW)
- Debut: 2021, Gold Coast vs. Greater Western Sydney
- Height: 167 cm (5 ft 6 in)

Playing career^{1}
Years	Club	Games (Goals)
2021–2022 (S6)	Gold Coast	3 (0)
2022 (S7)–2023	Hawthorn	1 (0)
Total		4 (0)
- ^{1} Playing statistics correct to the end of 2023.

Janet Baird (born 12 January 2000) is a former Australian rules footballer who played the Gold Coast and Hawthorn in the AFL Women's (AFLW).

== Early life ==
Baird is a Tiwi woman who was raised in Arnhem Land in the Northern Territory.

She moved to Darwin to further her football, playing her junior football with Palmerston in the NTFL and senior football with the NT Thunder in the VFLW.

Biard was overlooked in the AFLW draft, despite representing the Allies U18 team, however she refused to give up on an AFLW career. Following the draft the Gold Coast Suns offered her a train-on position in 2021 She was selected to debut the following year in round 3.

== Statistics ==
Legend
G	Goals	K	Kicks	D	Disposals	T	Tackles
B	Behinds	H	Handballs	M	Marks

Season	Team	No.	Games	Totals							Averages (per game)							Votes
Season	Team	No.	Games	G	B	K	H	D	M	T	G	B	K	H	D	M	T	Votes
2021	Gold Coast	18	2	0	0	5	3	8	1	3	0.0	0.0	2.5	1.5	4.0	0.5	1.5	0
2022 (S6)	Gold Coast	18	1	0	0	4	2	6	1	1	0.0	0.0	4.0	2.0	6.0	1.0	1.0	0
2022 (S7)	Hawthorn	2	1	0	0	1	0	1	0	0	0.0	0.0	1.0	0.0	1.0	0.0	0.0	0
2023	Hawthorn	2	0	—	—	—	—	—	—	—	—	—	—	—	—	—	—	0
Career			4	0	0	10	5	15	2	4	0.0	0.0	2.5	1.2	3.8	0.5	1.0	0
