= List of AFL Women's debuts in 2025 =

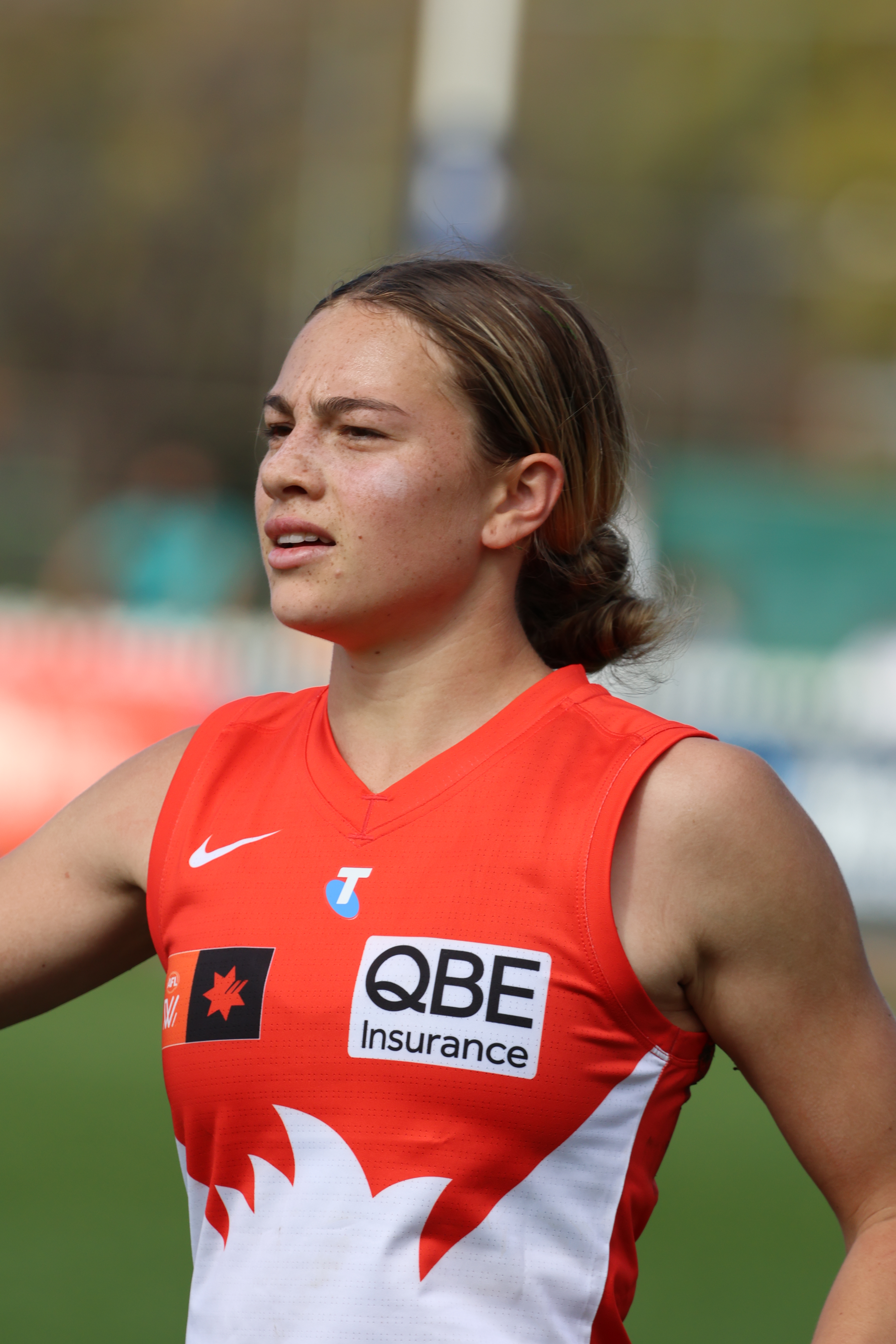
Sydney's Zippy Fish made her debut in round one

This is a list of players in the AFL Women's (AFLW) who have either made their AFLW debut or played for a new club during the 2025 AFL Women's season. Debutants and their statistics are correct to the end of the 2025 season.

== Summary ==
Summary of debuts in 2025
| Club | AFLW debuts | Change of club |
|---|---|---|
| Adelaide | 3 | 2 |
| Brisbane | 2 | 0 |
| Carlton | 6 | 1 |
| Collingwood | 4 | 3 |
| Essendon | 8 | 3 |
| Fremantle | 6 | 1 |
| Geelong | 5 | 1 |
| Gold Coast | 7 | 1 |
| Greater Western Sydney | 5 | 4 |
| Hawthorn | 4 | 2 |
| Melbourne | 3 | 0 |
| North Melbourne | 3 | 2 |
| Port Adelaide | 5 | 1 |
| Richmond | 3 | 5 |
| St Kilda | 2 | 5 |
| Sydney | 4 | 4 |
| West Coast | 6 | 3 |
| Western Bulldogs | 3 | 1 |
| Total | 79 | 39 |

== AFLW debuts ==
| Name | Club | Age at debut | Debut round | Games (in 2025) | Goals (in 2025) | Recruiting method | Ref. |
|---|---|---|---|---|---|---|---|
| Ash Centra | Collingwood | 19 years, 73 days | 1 | 8 | 6 | Pick 1, 2024 national draft | |
| Kellyann Hogan | Collingwood | 23 years, 294 days | 1 | 4 | 0 | Rookie signing | |
| Sophie McKay | Carlton | 19 years, 109 days | 1 | 15 | 18 | Pick 17 (F/D), 2024 national draft | |
| Violet Patterson | Collingwood | 19 years, 217 days | 1 | 11 | 1 | Pick 42 (F/D), 2024 national draft | |
| Poppy Scholz | Carlton | 18 years, 226 days | 1 | 15 | 13 | Pick 6, 2024 national draft | |
| Kayla Dalgleish | West Coast | 19 years, 169 days | 1 | 11 | 6 | Pick 7, 2024 national draft | |
| Havana Harris | Gold Coast | 19 years, 44 days | 1 | 12 | 11 | Pick 2 (A), 2024 national draft | |
| Tayla Gregory | Gold Coast | 28 years, 37 days | 1 | 5 | 1 | Injury replacement signing | |
| Nyalli Milne | Gold Coast | 19 years, 80 days | 1 | 4 | 1 | Pick 41 (A), 2024 national draft | |
| Lucia Painter | West Coast | 19 years, 30 days | 1 | 11 | 10 | Pick 57, 2024 national draft | |
| Mia Salisbury | Gold Coast | 19 years, 48 days | 1 | 11 | 0 | Pick 29 (A), 2024 national draft | |
| Ellie Veerhuis | Gold Coast | 19 years, 208 days | 1 | 11 | 0 | Injury replacement signing | |
| Zippy Fish | Sydney | 19 years, 72 days | 1 | 12 | 4 | Pick 5, 2024 national draft | |
| Caitlin Reid | Sydney | 28 years, 128 days | 1 | 7 | 0 | Pick 60, 2024 national draft | |
| Piper Dunlop | Geelong | 21 years, 324 days | 1 | 9 | 0 | Pick 37, 2024 national draft | |
| Emma Kilpatrick | Geelong | 19 years, 44 days | 1 | 11 | 1 | Replacement signing | |
| Blaithin Bogue | North Melbourne | 25 years, 21 days | 1 | 15 | 25 | 2024 supplementary selection | |
| Grace Belloni | Essendon | 18 years, 241 days | 1 | 8 | 2 | Pick 9, 2024 national draft | |
| Taya Chambers | Essendon | 19 years, 31 days | 1 | 10 | 0 | Pick 30, 2024 national draft | |
| Caitlin Fletcher | Greater Western Sydney | 21 years, 318 days | 1 | 1 | 0 | Replacement signing | |
| Sara Howley | Greater Western Sydney | 19 years, 199 days | 1 | 12 | 2 | Pick 4, 2024 national draft | |
| Sophie Kavanagh | Greater Western Sydney | 20 years, 283 days | 1 | 7 | 0 | Replacement signing, previously listed with North Melbourne | |
| Grace Kos | Greater Western Sydney | 23 years, 359 days | 1 | 5 | 0 | Rookie signing | |
| Grace Martin | Greater Western Sydney | 18 years, 349 days | 1 | 12 | 0 | Pick 22, 2024 national draft | |
| Holly Ridewood | Essendon | 18 years, 252 days | 1 | 12 | 4 | Pick 12, 2024 national draft | |
| Emma McDonald | Western Bulldogs | 19 years, 120 days | 1 | 11 | 11 | Pick 8, 2024 national draft | |
| Molly O'Hehir | Melbourne | 19 years, 84 days | 1 | 13 | 0 | Pick 3, 2024 national draft | |
| Maggie Mahony | Melbourne | 18 years, 301 days | 1 | 13 | 3 | Pick 21, 2024 national draft | |
| Laela Ebert | Melbourne | 19 years, 121 days | 1 | 14 | 0 | Injury replacement signing | |
| Sarah Poustie | Western Bulldogs | 19 years, 223 days | 1 | 10 | 0 | Pick 25, 2024 national draft | |
| Lavinia Cox | Hawthorn | 19 years, 198 days | 1 | 3 | 0 | Pick 15, 2024 national draft | |
| Zoe Besanko | St Kilda | 19 years, 84 days | 1 | 11 | 2 | Pick 32, 2024 national draft | |
| Kayleigh Cronin | Adelaide | 28 years, 300 days | 1 | 6 | 0 | Rookie signing | |
| Kyla Forbes | St Kilda | 18 years, 344 days | 1 | 11 | 0 | Pick 55, 2024 national draft | |
| India Rasheed | Adelaide | 18 years, 261 days | 1 | 14 | 3 | Pick 13, 2024 national draft | |
| Georgie Brisbane | Fremantle | 18 years, 247 days | 1 | 11 | 5 | Pick 14, 2024 national draft | |
| Jasmine Sowden | Port Adelaide | 18 years, 243 days | 1 | 11 | 2 | Pick 52, 2024 national draft | |
| Indi Strom | Fremantle | 20 years, 313 days | 1 | 12 | 0 | Pick 51, 2024 national draft | |
| Amelia Martin | Sydney | 18 years, 349 days | 2 | 6 | 1 | Pick 56, 2024 national draft | |
| Nease Dooley | Brisbane | 25 years, 139 days | 2 | 14 | 10 | Rookie signing | |
| Grace Baba | Hawthorn | 18 years, 340 days | 2 | 9 | 0 | Pick 28, 2024 national draft | |
| Chloe Gaunt | Port Adelaide | 19 years, 33 days | 2 | 7 | 2 | Pick 48, 2024 national draft | |
| Amy Gavin Mangan | North Melbourne | 26 years, 216 days | 2 | 7 | 3 | Rookie signing | |
| Lily Paterson | Port Adelaide | 19 years, 113 days | 2 | 6 | 0 | Pick 19, 2024 national draft | |
| Kayley Kavanagh | West Coast | 20 years, 49 days | 2 | 7 | 1 | Pick 14, 2023 national draft | |
| Amelie Gladman | Essendon | 19 years, 74 days | 3 | 5 | 0 | Injury replacement signing | |
| Sierra Grieves | Richmond | 19 years, 103 days | 3 | 9 | 2 | Pick 11, 2024 national draft | |
| Jess Verbrugge | Essendon | 21 years, 206 days | 3 | 3 | 0 | Injury replacement signing | |
| Courtney Lindgren | West Coast | 23 years, 229 days | 3 | 2 | 0 | Injury replacement signing | |
| Charlotte Riggs | West Coast | 18 years, 301 days | 3 | 11 | 5 | Pick 24, 2024 national draft | |
| Elli Symonds | Hawthorn | 18 years, 325 days | 3 | 8 | 2 | Pick 45, 2024 national draft | |
| Indiana West | Fremantle | 19 years, 55 days | 3 | 10 | 0 | Injury replacement signing | |
| Siofra O'Connell | Carlton | 24 years, 129 days | 3 | 6 | 0 | Rookie signing | |
| Holly Ifould | Fremantle | 20 years, 5 days | 4 | 5 | 0 | Pick 49, 2023 national draft | |
| Maddison Torpey | Carlton | 20 years, 292 days | 4 | 3 | 0 | Replacement signing | |
| Alexis Gregor | Geelong | 19 years, 154 days | 4 | 9 | 0 | Pick 10, 2024 national draft | |
| Sophie Strong | Essendon | 18 years, 325 days | 4 | 5 | 0 | Pick 35, 2024 national draft | |
| Sienna Tallariti | Geelong | 19 years, 59 days | 4 | 7 | 0 | Pick 18, 2024 national draft | |
| Tara Harrington | Gold Coast | 19 years, 173 days | 5 | 8 | 0 | Pick 47 (A), 2024 national draft | |
| Aisling Reidy | Carlton | 24 years, 109 days | 5 | 4 | 1 | Rookie signing | |
| Jasmine Evans | Port Adelaide | 19 years, 220 days | 5 | 5 | 0 | Pick 33, 2024 national draft | |
| Keeley Hardingham | Western Bulldogs | 21 years, 262 days | 5 | 1 | 0 | Pick 48, 2024 national draft | |
| Matilda Banfield | Fremantle | 20 years, 117 days | 5 | 8 | 2 | Rookie signing | |
| Lauren Young | Port Adelaide | 20 years, 4 days | 6 | 4 | 2 | Expansion under-18 pre-signing | |
| Lou-Lou Field | Carlton | 21 years, 262 days | 6 | 1 | 0 | Pick 46, 2024 national draft | |
| Grace Brooker | Essendon | 18 years, 337 days | 6 | 5 | 2 | Rookie signing | |
| Poppy Stockwell | Fremantle | 21 years, 331 days | 6 | 2 | 1 | Replacement signing | |
| Sarah Steele-Park | Sydney | 29 years, 45 days | 7 | 2 | 0 | Pick 61, 2024 national draft | |
| Daisy Flockart | Hawthorn | 19 years, 221 days | 8 | 7 | 1 | Pick 23, 2024 national draft | |
| Caitlin Tipping | Geelong | 24 years, 323 days | 8 | 5 | 0 | Rookie signing | |
| Georgia Knight | Collingwood | 18 years, 359 days | 8 | 5 | 1 | Pick 26, 2024 national draft | |
| Christina Leuzzi | Adelaide | 22 years, 65 days | 9 | 1 | 0 | Replacement signing | |
| Lucy Boyd | West Coast | 19 years, 5 days | 10 | 2 | 0 | Replacement signing | |
| Claudia Wright | Brisbane | 18 years, 354 days | 10 | 2 | 0 | Pick 16, 2024 national draft | |
| Sienna McMullen | Gold Coast | 20 years, 96 days | 10 | 3 | 1 | Pick 51, 2023 national draft | |
| Aoibhin Cleary | Richmond | 26 years, 179 days | 11 | 2 | 0 | Rookie signing | |
| Ella Slocombe | North Melbourne | 19 years, 324 days | 11 | 1 | 0 | Pick 26, 2023 national draft | |
| Shelby Knoll | Richmond | 25 years, 1 day | 12 | 1 | 1 | Pick 27, 2023 supplementary draft | |
| Brooke Sheridan | Essendon | 21 years, 54 days | 12 | 1 | 0 | Replacement signing | |

== Change of AFLW club ==
| Name | Club | Age at debut | Debut round | Games (in 2025) | Goals (in 2025) | Former clubs | Recruiting method | Ref. |
|---|---|---|---|---|---|---|---|---|
| Kalinda Howarth | Collingwood | 26 years, 12 days | 1 | 11 | 7 | Brisbane & Gold Coast | Traded in 2023 | |
| Airlie Runnalls | Collingwood | 27 years, 50 days | 1 | 12 | 2 | Fremantle | Traded in 2024 | |
| Tara Bohanna | Carlton | 30 years, 165 days | 1 | 13 | 15 | Gold Coast | Traded in 2024 | |
| Liz McGrath | West Coast | 27 years, 165 days | 1 | 5 | 0 | Port Adelaide & North Melbourne | Traded in 2024 | |
| Lily Mithen | Gold Coast | 27 years, 234 days | 1 | 8 | 0 | Melbourne | Traded in 2024 | |
| Lulu Beatty | Richmond | 21 years, 131 days | 1 | 12 | 0 | Carlton | Replacement signing | |
| Montana Beruldsen | Richmond | 26 years, 171 days | 1 | 8 | 1 | Sydney | Traded in 2024 | |
| Jasmine Grierson | Sydney | 27 years, 91 days | 1 | 12 | 1 | Melbourne, North Melbourne & Greater Western Sydney | Delisted free agent in 2024 | |
| Darcy Moloney | Sydney | 22 years, 268 days | 1 | 11 | 2 | Geelong | Traded in 2024 | |
| Lulu Pullar | Sydney | 27 years, 43 days | 1 | 12 | 1 | Brisbane & North Melbourne | Traded in 2024 | |
| Paige Scott | Richmond | 21 years, 51 days | 1 | 12 | 3 | Essendon | Traded in 2024 | |
| Ash Van Loon | Sydney | 21 years, 4 days | 1 | 10 | 0 | Essendon | Traded in 2024 | |
| Eilish Sheerin | North Melbourne | 32 years, 315 days | 1 | 9 | 4 | Richmond | Traded in 2024 | |
| Ariana Hetherington | North Melbourne | 26 years, 51 days | 1 | 5 | 0 | Fremantle | Traded in 2024 | |
| Eleanor Brown | Greater Western Sydney | 25 years, 208 days | 1 | 7 | 0 | Western Bulldogs | Traded in 2024 | |
| Maggie MacLachlan | Essendon | 22 years, 351 days | 1 | 11 | 4 | Port Adelaide & Fremantle | Replacement signing | |
| Courtney Murphy | Essendon | 25 years, 36 days | 1 | 6 | 1 | Brisbane & Greater Western Sydney | Traded in 2024 | |
| Najwa Allen | Hawthorn | 31 years, 53 days | 1 | 7 | 0 | Adelaide | Traded in 2024 | |
| Charlotte Baskaran | St Kilda | 20 years, 251 days | 1 | 13 | 3 | Hawthorn | Traded in 2024 | |
| Amber Clarke | St Kilda | 20 years, 238 days | 1 | 13 | 5 | Essendon | Traded in 2024 | |
| Arianna Clarke | St Kilda | 26 years, 1 day | 1 | 7 | 1 | Brisbane | Replacement signing | |
| Hannah Ewings | Adelaide | 21 years, 149 days | 1 | 3 | 0 | Port Adelaide | Traded in 2024 | |
| Grace Kelly | Adelaide | 31 years, 121 days | 1 | 13 | 7 | West Coast & St Kilda | Traded in 2024 | |
| Ella Heads | Port Adelaide | 22 years, 54 days | 1 | 12 | 2 | Sydney | Traded in 2024 | |
| Bella Smith | Fremantle | 23 years, 331 days | 1 | 4 | 1 | Collingwood & Sydney | Traded in 2024 | |
| Taylah Levy | Greater Western Sydney | 24 years, 145 days | 2 | 9 | 3 | Adelaide | Traded in 2024 | |
| Lily-Rose Williamson | Collingwood | 20 years, 363 days | 2 | 11 | 0 | Essendon | Replacement signing | |
| Nicola Barr | St Kilda | 29 years, 71 days | 2 | 9 | 0 | Greater Western Sydney | Traded in 2024 | |
| Erica Fowler | Geelong | 33 years, 47 days | 2 | 8 | 1 | Collingwood | Replacement signing | |
| Daisy Walker | Greater Western Sydney | 23 years, 85 days | 3 | 10 | 0 | Carlton | Delisted free agent in 2023 | |
| Lauren Brazzale | Richmond | 31 years, 305 days | 4 | 2 | 0 | Carlton & Collingwood | Replacement signing | |
| Montana McKinnon | Richmond | 24 years, 54 days | 4 | 2 | 0 | Adelaide | Traded in 2023 | |
| Annabel Johnson | West Coast | 24 years, 319 days | 6 | 4 | 0 | Geelong | Traded in 2023 | |
| Lisa Steane | West Coast | 30 years, 250 days | 7 | 1 | 0 | Greater Western Sydney & Sydney | Replacement signing | |
| Mua Laloifi | Western Bulldogs | 32 years, 78 days | 9 | 4 | 0 | Carlton | Traded in 2023 | |
| Alana Gee | St Kilda | 21 years, 175 days | 9 | 5 | 0 | Gold Coast | Pick 58, 2024 national draft | |
| Nat Exon | Hawthorn | 32 years, 322 days | 11 | 3 | 0 | Carlton, Brisbane & St Kilda | Replacement signing | |
| Vivien Saad | Greater Western Sydney | 33 years, 125 days | 11 | 1 | 0 | North Melbourne & Gold Coast | Replacement signing | |
| Bailey Hunt | Essendon | 29 years, 43 days | 12 | 1 | 0 | Western Bulldogs | Train-on player | |

== See also ==
- List of AFL debuts in 2025
