= 2024–25 AFL Women's player movement period =

Ninth player movement period of the AFL Women's (AFLW) competition

The 2024–25 AFL Women's player movement period consisted of the various periods when the 18 clubs in the AFL Women's (AFLW) competition could recruit players following the 2024 AFL Women's season.

== Retirements and delistings ==
Name	Club	Date	Status	Ref.
Alana Woodward	Sydney	1 October 2024	Retired	
Jess Dal Pos	Carlton	30 October 2024	Retired	
Evie Gooch	West Coast	30 October 2024	Retired	
Brooke Lochland	Sydney	1 November 2024	Retired	
Stacey Livingstone	Collingwood	1 November 2024	Retired	
Rhiannon Watt	Melbourne	2 November 2024	Retired	
Steph Chiocci	St Kilda	3 November 2024	Retired	
Marianna Anthony	Carlton	8 November 2024	Delisted	
Tahlia Read	Carlton	8 November 2024	Delisted	
Ashanti Bush	Gold Coast	8 November 2024	Delisted	
Alana Gee	Gold Coast	8 November 2024	Delisted	
Lauren McConville	Gold Coast	8 November 2024	Delisted	
Cara McCrossan	Gold Coast	8 November 2024	Delisted	
Jordan Membrey	Gold Coast	8 November 2024	Delisted	
Vivien Saad	Gold Coast	8 November 2024	Delisted	
Delany Madigan	Melbourne	8 November 2024	Delisted	
Jasmine Grierson	Greater Western Sydney	11 November 2024	Delisted	
Jorja Borg	Western Bulldogs	11 November 2024	Delisted	
Keely Coyne	Western Bulldogs	11 November 2024	Delisted	
Aurora Smith	Western Bulldogs	11 November 2024	Delisted	
Elizabeth Snell	Western Bulldogs	11 November 2024	Delisted	
Abbey McDonald	Geelong	11 November 2024	Delisted	
Lilly Pearce	Geelong	11 November 2024	Delisted	
Brooke Plummer	Geelong	11 November 2024	Delisted	
Caitlin Miller	Greater Western Sydney	12 November 2024	Delisted	
Jemma Ramsdale	Greater Western Sydney	12 November 2024	Delisted	
Annise Bradfield	Greater Western Sydney	12 November 2024	Retired	
Charlotte Blair	Collingwood	12 November 2024	Delisted	
Lauren Brazzale	Collingwood	12 November 2024	Delisted	
Erica Fowler	Collingwood	12 November 2024	Delisted	
Sarah Sansonetti	Collingwood	12 November 2024	Delisted	
Simone Nalder	St Kilda	12 November 2024	Retired	
Octavia Di Donato	West Coast	13 November 2024	Delisted	
Emily Elkington	West Coast	13 November 2024	Delisted	
Sasha Goranova	West Coast	13 November 2024	Delisted	
Jayme Harken	West Coast	13 November 2024	Delisted	
Tess Lyons	West Coast	13 November 2024	Delisted	
Matilda Sergeant	West Coast	13 November 2024	Delisted	
Verity Simmons	West Coast	13 November 2024	Delisted	
Mackenzie Webb	West Coast	13 November 2024	Delisted	
Lily-Rose Williamson	Essendon	14 November 2024	Delisted	
Bridget Deed	Hawthorn	19 November 2024	Delisted	
Casey Dumont	Hawthorn	19 November 2024	Delisted	
Tamara Luke	Richmond	19 November 2024	Retired	
Molly Eastman	Richmond	19 November 2024	Delisted	
Amelia Peck	Richmond	19 November 2024	Delisted	
Jemima Woods	Richmond	19 November 2024	Delisted	
Paige Sheppard	Sydney	19 November 2024	Delisted	
Lisa Steane	Sydney	19 November 2024	Delisted	
Lauren Szigeti	Sydney	19 November 2024	Delisted	
Eliza Vale	Sydney	19 November 2024	Delisted	
Aimee Whelan	Sydney	19 November 2024	Delisted	
Mikayla Morrison	Fremantle	21 November 2024	Retired	
Serena Gibbs	Fremantle	21 November 2024	Delisted	
Tahleah Mulder	Fremantle	21 November 2024	Delisted	
Tara Stribley	Fremantle	21 November 2024	Delisted	
Makaela Tuhakaraina	Fremantle	21 November 2024	Delisted	
Maddie Boyd	St Kilda	22 November 2024	Delisted	
Nat Exon	St Kilda	22 November 2024	Delisted	
Caitlin Matthews	St Kilda	22 November 2024	Delisted	
Beth Pinchin	St Kilda	22 November 2024	Delisted	
Kate Lutkins	Brisbane	26 November 2024	Retired	
Ange Foley	Port Adelaide	27 November 2024	Retired	
Maddy Keryk	Port Adelaide	3 December 2024	Retired	
Alex Ballard	Port Adelaide	3 December 2024	Delisted	
Jo Miller	Port Adelaide	3 December 2024	Delisted	
Aishling Sheridan	Collingwood	3 December 2024	Retired	
Olivia Levicki	Port Adelaide	4 December 2024	Retired	
Deni Varnhagen	Adelaide	4 December 2024	Retired	
Hannah Dunn	Port Adelaide	4 December 2024	Retired	
Jasmine Simmons	Port Adelaide	4 December 2024	Delisted	
Jae Flynn	Fremantle	12 December 2024	Delisted	
Georgie Jaques	Port Adelaide	12 December 2024	Retired	

== Trade period ==
=== Trades ===
The trade period took place from 5 to 11 December 2024.

Pick #→	Draft pick was later on-traded to another club

Date	Clubs involved	Club	Received	Ref.
5 December	Essendon / Greater Western Sydney	Essendon	Courtney Murphy	
5 December	Essendon / Greater Western Sydney	Greater Western Sydney	Pick 65	
5 December	Geelong / Sydney	Geelong	Pick 22→	
5 December	Geelong / Sydney	Sydney	Darcy Moloney	
6 December	North Melbourne / West Coast	North Melbourne	Pick 42	
6 December	North Melbourne / West Coast	West Coast	Liz McGrath	
6 December	North Melbourne / West Coast	West Coast	Pick 54	
6 December	Adelaide / Collingwood / Geelong / Gold Coast / Melbourne / Richmond	Adelaide	Pick 12 (from Richmond)	
6 December	Adelaide / Collingwood / Geelong / Gold Coast / Melbourne / Richmond	Adelaide	Pick 48→ (from Richmond)	
6 December	Adelaide / Collingwood / Geelong / Gold Coast / Melbourne / Richmond	Collingwood	Pick 22→ (from Geelong)	
6 December	Adelaide / Collingwood / Geelong / Gold Coast / Melbourne / Richmond	Collingwood	Pick 28→ (from Melbourne)	
6 December	Adelaide / Collingwood / Geelong / Gold Coast / Melbourne / Richmond	Collingwood	Pick 45→ (from Geelong)	
6 December	Adelaide / Collingwood / Geelong / Gold Coast / Melbourne / Richmond	Geelong	Pick 16 (from Adelaide)	
6 December	Adelaide / Collingwood / Geelong / Gold Coast / Melbourne / Richmond	Geelong	Pick 37 (from Collingwood)	
6 December	Adelaide / Collingwood / Geelong / Gold Coast / Melbourne / Richmond	Gold Coast	Lily Mithen (from Melbourne)	
6 December	Adelaide / Collingwood / Geelong / Gold Coast / Melbourne / Richmond	Gold Coast	Pick 19 (from Collingwood)	
6 December	Adelaide / Collingwood / Geelong / Gold Coast / Melbourne / Richmond	Gold Coast	Pick 27 (from Geelong)	
6 December	Adelaide / Collingwood / Geelong / Gold Coast / Melbourne / Richmond	Gold Coast	Pick 30 (from Richmond)	
6 December	Adelaide / Collingwood / Geelong / Gold Coast / Melbourne / Richmond	Gold Coast	Pick 46 (from Melbourne)	
6 December	Adelaide / Collingwood / Geelong / Gold Coast / Melbourne / Richmond	Melbourne	Pick 2 (from Gold Coast)	
6 December	Adelaide / Collingwood / Geelong / Gold Coast / Melbourne / Richmond	Melbourne	Pick 20 (from Gold Coast)	
6 December	Adelaide / Collingwood / Geelong / Gold Coast / Melbourne / Richmond	Richmond	Pick 10 (from Melbourne)	
6 December	Adelaide / Collingwood / Geelong / Gold Coast / Melbourne / Richmond	Richmond	Pick 34→ (from Adelaide)	
6 December	Adelaide / Collingwood / Geelong / Gold Coast / Melbourne / Richmond	Richmond	Pick 38→ (from Gold Coast)	
7 December	Hawthorn / St Kilda	Hawthorn	Pick 26→	
7 December	Hawthorn / St Kilda	Hawthorn	Pick 44	
7 December	Hawthorn / St Kilda	St Kilda	Charlotte Baskaran	
7 December	Hawthorn / St Kilda	St Kilda	Pick 32	
9 December	Carlton / Gold Coast	Carlton	Tara Bohanna	
9 December	Carlton / Gold Coast	Carlton	Pick 56→	
9 December	Carlton / Gold Coast	Gold Coast	Pick 41	
10 December	Adelaide / Greater Western Sydney / Hawthorn / Western Bulldogs	Adelaide	Pick 39→ (from Greater Western Sydney)	
10 December	Adelaide / Greater Western Sydney / Hawthorn / Western Bulldogs	Adelaide	Pick 43 (from Western Bulldogs)	
10 December	Adelaide / Greater Western Sydney / Hawthorn / Western Bulldogs	Greater Western Sydney	Eleanor Brown (from Western Bulldogs)	
10 December	Adelaide / Greater Western Sydney / Hawthorn / Western Bulldogs	Greater Western Sydney	Taylah Levy (from Adelaide)	
10 December	Adelaide / Greater Western Sydney / Hawthorn / Western Bulldogs	Hawthorn	Najwa Allen (from Adelaide)	
10 December	Adelaide / Greater Western Sydney / Hawthorn / Western Bulldogs	Western Bulldogs	Louise Stephenson (from Hawthorn)	
10 December	Adelaide / Greater Western Sydney / Hawthorn / Western Bulldogs	Western Bulldogs	Pick 48 (from Adelaide)	
10 December	Richmond / Sydney	Richmond	Montana Beruldsen	
10 December	Richmond / Sydney	Sydney	Imogen Brown	
10 December	Adelaide / Port Adelaide	Adelaide	Hannah Ewings	
10 December	Adelaide / Port Adelaide	Port Adelaide	Pick 39→	
10 December	Collingwood / Hawthorn	Collingwood	Mattea Breed	
10 December	Collingwood / Hawthorn	Collingwood	Pick 26	
10 December	Collingwood / Hawthorn	Hawthorn	Pick 22	
10 December	Collingwood / Hawthorn	Hawthorn	Pick 28	
10 December	Fremantle / Sydney	Fremantle	Bella Smith	
10 December	Fremantle / Sydney	Sydney	Pick 49→	
11 December	North Melbourne / Richmond	North Melbourne	Eilish Sheerin	
11 December	North Melbourne / Richmond	Richmond	Pick 18	
11 December	Adelaide / Greater Western Sydney / St Kilda	Adelaide	Grace Kelly (from St Kilda)	
11 December	Adelaide / Greater Western Sydney / St Kilda	Greater Western Sydney	Pick 52 (from Adelaide)	
11 December	Adelaide / Greater Western Sydney / St Kilda	St Kilda	Nicola Barr (from Greater Western Sydney)	
11 December	Adelaide / Greater Western Sydney / St Kilda	St Kilda	Pick 57 (from Greater Western Sydney)	
11 December	Brisbane / Essendon / Port Adelaide / Sydney	Brisbane	Pick 15 (from Port Adelaide)	
11 December	Brisbane / Essendon / Port Adelaide / Sydney	Brisbane	Pick 39 (from Port Adelaide)	
11 December	Brisbane / Essendon / Port Adelaide / Sydney	Essendon	Pick 35 (from Brisbane)	
11 December	Brisbane / Essendon / Port Adelaide / Sydney	Port Adelaide	Ella Heads (from Sydney)	
11 December	Brisbane / Essendon / Port Adelaide / Sydney	Port Adelaide	Pick 17 (from Brisbane)	
11 December	Brisbane / Essendon / Port Adelaide / Sydney	Port Adelaide	Pick 40 (from Sydney)	
11 December	Brisbane / Essendon / Port Adelaide / Sydney	Port Adelaide	Pick 47 (from Essendon)	
11 December	Brisbane / Essendon / Port Adelaide / Sydney	Port Adelaide	Pick 53 (from Brisbane)	
11 December	Brisbane / Essendon / Port Adelaide / Sydney	Sydney	Ashleigh Van Loon (from Essendon)	
11 December	Brisbane / Essendon / Port Adelaide / Sydney	Sydney	Pick 51→ (from Port Adelaide)	
11 December	North Melbourne / Sydney	North Melbourne	Pick 49	
11 December	North Melbourne / Sydney	North Melbourne	Pick 51→	
11 December	North Melbourne / Sydney	Sydney	Lulu Pullar	
11 December	Collingwood / Fremantle	Collingwood	Airlie Runnalls	
11 December	Collingwood / Fremantle	Fremantle	Pick 45→	
11 December	Fremantle / North Melbourne	Fremantle	Pick 51	
11 December	Fremantle / North Melbourne	North Melbourne	Ariana Hetherington	
11 December	Essendon / St Kilda	Essendon	Pick 8	
11 December	Essendon / St Kilda	St Kilda	Amber Clarke	
11 December	Fremantle / Richmond	Fremantle	Pick 34	
11 December	Fremantle / Richmond	Fremantle	Pick 38	
11 December	Fremantle / Richmond	Richmond	Pick 31	
11 December	Fremantle / Richmond	Richmond	Pick 45→	
11 December	Carlton / Richmond	Carlton	Pick 45	
11 December	Carlton / Richmond	Richmond	Pick 56	
11 December	Carlton / Richmond	Richmond	Pick 59	

=== Summary ===
The following table summarises the players and picks that were traded in and out of each club during the trade period (excluding picks that were later on-traded).

Club	In	Out
Adelaide	Hannah Ewings, Grace Kelly, 12, 43	Najwa Allen, Taylah Levy, 16, 34, 52
Brisbane	15, 39	17, 35, 53
Carlton	Tara Bohanna, 45	41, 59
Collingwood	Mattea Breed, Airlie Runnalls, 26	19, 37
Essendon	Courtney Murphy, 8, 35	Amber Clarke, Ashleigh Van Loon, 47, 65
Fremantle	Bella Smith, 34, 38, 51	Ariana Hetherington, Airlie Runnalls, 31, 49
Geelong	16, 37	Darcy Moloney, 27, 45
Gold Coast	Lily Mithen, 19, 27, 30, 41, 46	Tara Bohanna, 2, 20, 38, 56
Greater Western Sydney	Eleanor Brown, Taylah Levy, 52, 65	Nicola Barr, Courtney Murphy, 39, 57
Hawthorn	Najwa Allen, 22, 28, 44	Charlotte Baskaran, Mattea Breed, Louise Stephenson, 32
Melbourne	2, 20	Lily Mithen, 10, 28, 46
North Melbourne	Ariana Hetherington, Eilish Sheerin, 42, 49	Liz McGrath, Lulu Pullar, 18, 54
Port Adelaide	Ella Heads, 17, 40, 47, 53	Hannah Ewings, 15, 51
Richmond	10, 18, 31, 56, 59	Eilish Sheerin, 12, 30, 48
St Kilda	Nicola Barr, Charlotte Baskaran, Amber Clarke, 32, 57	Grace Kelly, 8, 26, 44
Sydney	Darcy Moloney, Lulu Pullar, Ashleigh Van Loon	Ella Heads, Bella Smith, 22, 40
West Coast	Liz McGrath, 54	42
Western Bulldogs	Louise Stephenson, 48	Eleanor Brown, 43

== Delisted free agency ==
Name	New club	Previous club	Date	Ref.
Keely Coyne	Hawthorn	Western Bulldogs	5 December 2024	
Jasmine Grierson	Sydney	Greater Western Sydney	8 December 2024	

== Draft ==
The national draft was held on 16 December 2024.

== Replacement players ==
Where players were moved to inactive list after the draft had taken place, due to injury, personal reasons, retirement or pregnancy, the clubs were allowed to recruit replacement players.

Name	Club	Recruited from		Replacing	Date	Ref.
Name	Club	Club	League	Replacing	Date	Ref.
Vivien Saad	Greater Western Sydney	Gold Coast	AFL Women's	Meghan Gaffney (injury)	14 January 2025	
Maria Cannon	Carlton	Mayo	Ireland	Celine Moody (retirement)	21 February 2025	
Eliza Wood	Carlton	Carlton	VFL Women's	Kerryn Peterson (pregnancy)	2 April 2025	
Poppy Stockwell	Fremantle	South Fremantle	WAFL Women's	Ebony Antonio (pregnancy)	24 April 2025	
Maddison Torpey	Carlton	Box Hill	VFL Women's	Tarni Brown (personal)	3 May 2025	
Maggie MacLachlan	Essendon	Subiaco	WAFL Women's	Emily Gough (injury)	7 May 2025	
Lilu Hung	St Kilda	Aspley	QAFL Women's	Emmelie Fiedler (injury)	12 May 2025	
Emma Kilpatrick	Geelong	West Adelaide	SANFLW	Chantel Emonson (pregnancy)	12 May 2025	
Erica Fowler	Geelong	Collingwood	AFL Women's	Anna-Rose Kennedy (personal)	29 May 2025	
Laela Ebert	Melbourne	North Adelaide	SANFLW	Jacinta Hose (injury)	29 May 2025	
Christina Leuzzi	Adelaide	Woodville-West Torrens	SANFLW	Georgia McKee (injury)	23 June 2025	
Coby Morgan	Port Adelaide	Norwood	SANFLW	Caitlin Wendland (injury)	23 July 2025	
Charlotte Brewer	Carlton	Collingwood	VFL Women's	Eliza Wood (injury)	24 July 2025	
Arianna Clarke	St Kilda	Sandringham	VFL Women's	Kiera Whiley (retirement)	1 August 2025	
Indiana West	Fremantle	Swan Districts	WAFL Women's	Holly Egan (injury)	4 August 2025	
Lily-Rose Williamson	Collingwood	Collingwood	VFL Women's	Mattea Breed (injury)	6 August 2025	
