= 2023 AFL Women's Rising Star =

- Sponsored by: National Australia Bank
- Date: 27 November 2023
- Venue: Crown Melbourne
- Hosted by: Sarah Jones
- Winner: Zarlie Goldsworthy (Greater Western Sydney)

Television/radio coverage
- Network: Fox Footy

The 2023 AFL Women's Rising Star award was presented to the player adjudged the best young player during the 2023 AFL Women's season. Greater Western Sydney's Zarlie Goldsworthy won the award with 41 votes.

== Eligibility ==
To be eligible for nomination, players must be under 21 years of age on 31 December, have not previously been nominated for the award (unless they have played ten or less matches at the beginning of the season) and have not previously won the award.

== Nominations ==
Table of nominees
Round	Player	Club	Ref.
1	Ally Morphett	Sydney	
1	Ella Roberts	West Coast	
2	Zarlie Goldsworthy	Greater Western Sydney	
2	Matilda Scholz	Port Adelaide	
3	Jasmine Fleming	Hawthorn	
3	Keeley Skepper	Carlton	
4	Steph Wales	Essendon	
4	Rylie Wilcox	Western Bulldogs	
5	Ella Heads	Sydney	
5	Lauren Wakfer	West Coast	
6	Charlotte Baskaran	Hawthorn	
6	Amber Clarke	Essendon	
7	Kiera Mueller	Adelaide	
7	Emelia Yassir	Richmond	
8	Mia Austin	Carlton	
8	Sofia Hurley	Sydney	
9	Charlotte Mullins	Brisbane	
9	Lucy Wales	Hawthorn	
10	Darcie Davies	Gold Coast	
10	Zali Friswell	Geelong	

Table of nominations by club
Number	Club	Player	Rd.
3	Hawthorn	Jasmine Fleming	3
3	Hawthorn	Charlotte Baskaran	6
3	Hawthorn	Lucy Wales	9
3	Sydney	Ally Morphett	1
3	Sydney	Ella Heads	5
3	Sydney	Sofia Hurley	8
2	Carlton	Keeley Skepper	3
2	Carlton	Mia Austin	8
2	Essendon	Steph Wales	4
2	Essendon	Amber Clarke	6
2	West Coast	Ella Roberts	1
2	West Coast	Lauren Wakfer	5
1	Adelaide	Kiera Mueller	7
1	Brisbane	Charlotte Mullins	9
1	Geelong	Zali Friswell	10
1	Gold Coast	Darcie Davies	10
1	Greater Western Sydney	Zarlie Goldsworthy	2
1	Port Adelaide	Matilda Scholz	2
1	Richmond	Emelia Yassir	7
1	Western Bulldogs	Rylie Wilcox	4

== Final voting ==
Table of votes
Placing	Player	Club	Nom.	Votes
1	Zarlie Goldsworthy	Greater Western Sydney	2	41
2	Ally Morphett	Sydney	1	40
3	Ella Roberts	West Coast	1	23
4	Matilda Scholz	Port Adelaide	2	13
5	Jasmine Fleming	Hawthorn	3	7
