= Runnalls =

Runnalls is a surname. Notable people with the surname include:

- Adam Runnalls (born 1998), Canadian biathlete
- Airlie Runnalls (born 1998), Australian rules footballer
