= Zarlie Goldsworthy =

Australian rules footballer

Personal information
- Full name: Zarlie-Anna Goldsworthy
- Born: 18 November 2004 (age 21)
- Original team: Murray Bushrangers (Talent League Girls)
- Draft: No. 20, 2022 AFL Women's draft
- Height: 169 cm (5 ft 7 in)
- Position: Midfielder/forward

Club information
- Current club: Greater Western Sydney
- Number: 7

Playing career^{1}
Years	Club	Games (Goals)
2022 (S7)–	Greater Western Sydney	18 (16)
- ^{1} Playing statistics correct to the end of the 2023 season.

Career highlights
- 2× Gabrielle Trainor Medal: 2023, 2025; 2× Greater Western Sydney leading goalkicker: 2023, 2024; AFL Women's Rising Star: 2023; 3× 22under22: 2023, 2024, 2025

Zarlie-Anna Goldsworthy (born 18 November 2004) is an Australian rules footballer who plays for Greater Western Sydney in the AFL Women's (AFLW). In 2023, her second season in the league, she won both her club's best and fairest and the league's Rising Star awards.

== Pre-AFLW ==
Goldsworthy hails from Thurgoona, Albury, New South Wales, and played numerous sports in her youth, particularly soccer, cricket and Australian rules.

In 2018, she made the New South Wales all schools AFL side representing Trinity Anglican College, played cricket with North-East Knights and was signed to the Cricket Victoria High Performance Academy and was selected in the New South Wales Country soccer team.

Goldsworthy was a young soccer star, achieving selection in the national level (Junior Matilda) in 2019. In 2021 at the age of 16 she was playing soccer with Albury United. In cricket, she was selected in the Female Victoria Country Squad in 2021-22. In 2022 she was called to play for the played for the Murray Bushrangers in the Talent League Girls in Australian rules in 2022. She only continued to focus on Australian rules as she "fell out of love" with soccer.

Goldsworthy represented the Allies at the 2022 AFL Women's Under-18 Championships, where she won her team's MVP award and was selected in the All-Australian team.

After playing with junior and senior football with the Western Magic where she became known for kicking bags of goals, including her first open age Grand Final. She returned to Albury to play senior football with the Lavington Panthers in the AFL North East Border Female Football League.

== AFLW ==
Goldsworthy was drafted by Greater Western Sydney with pick 20 in the 2022 AFL Women's draft. She made her debut in round three of 2022 season 7, kicking two goals in the inaugural AFLW Sydney Derby.

In her second season, she had a breakout year. In round eight, she became the youngest player to kick five goals in an AFLW game, "single-handedly dragg[ing] the Giants over the line" against Carlton. At Greater Western Sydney's awards night, she won the rising star award, members' player of the year, leading goalkicker award, "fearless award" and, most notably, the Gabrielle Trainor Medal as the club's best and fairest player. She also won the league Rising Star award by one vote over Sydney's Ally Morphett.

=== Statistics ===
Statistics are correct to the end of the 2023 season.

Legend
G	Goals	K	Kicks	D	Disposals	T	Tackles
B	Behinds	H	Handballs	M	Marks

Season	Team	No.	Games	Totals							Averages (per game)							Votes
Season	Team	No.	Games	G	B	K	H	D	M	T	G	B	K	H	D	M	T	Votes
2022 (S7)	Greater Western Sydney	7	8	3	9	41	27	68	10	28	0.4	1.1	5.1	3.4	8.5	1.3	3.5	0
2023	Greater Western Sydney	7	10	13	8	97	86	183	33	66	1.3	0.8	9.7	8.6	18.3	3.3	6.6	4
Career			18	16	17	138	113	251	43	94	0.9	0.9	7.7	6.3	13.9	2.4	5.2	4

== Honours and achievements ==
Individual

- 2× Gabrielle Trainor Medal: 2023, 2025
- 2× Greater Western Sydney leading goalkicker: 2023, 2024
- AFL Women's Rising Star: 2023
