= Ally Morphett =

Australian rules footballer (born 2003)

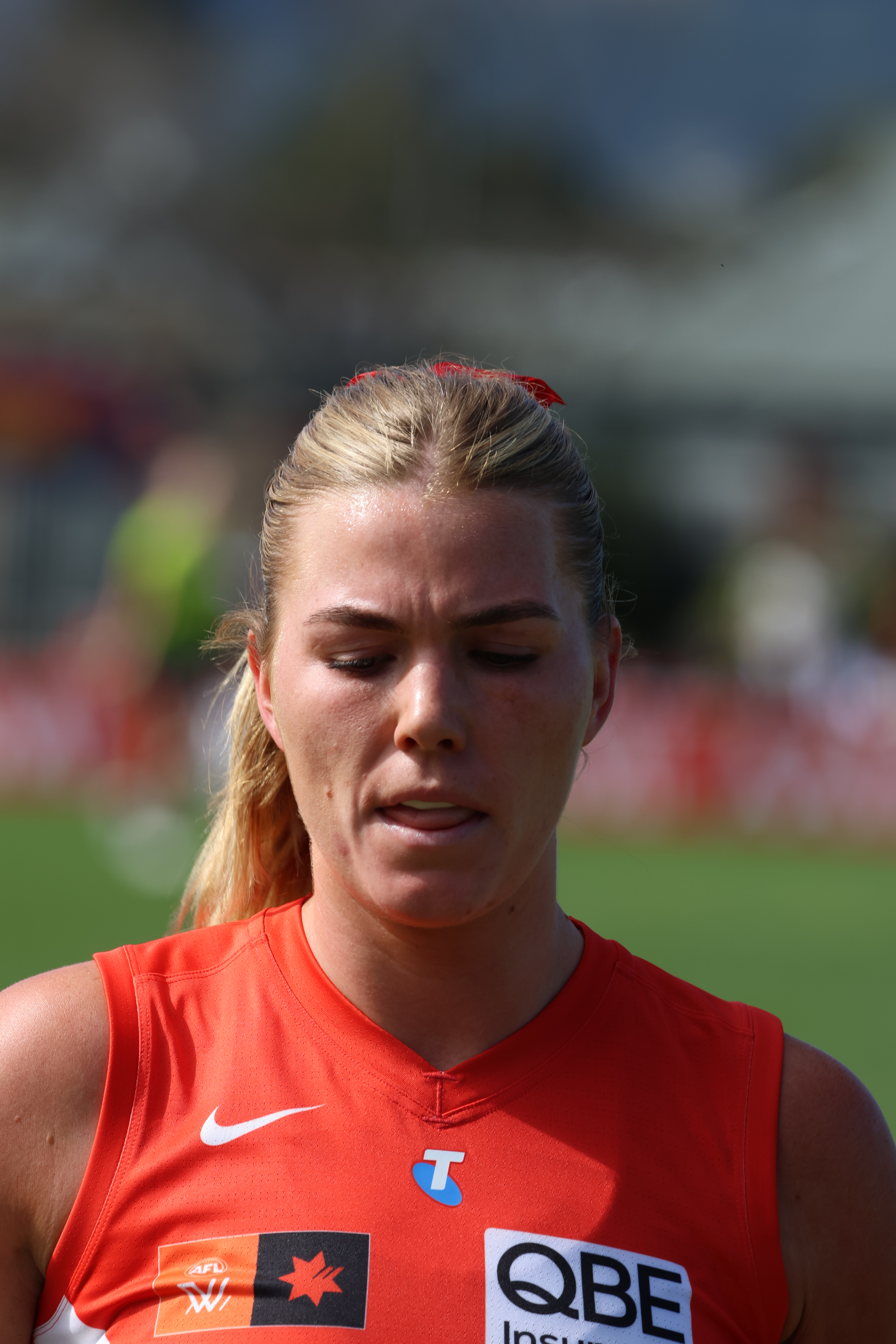
- Morphett in August 2026

Personal information
- Born: 11 November 2003 (age 22)
- Original team: Belconnen Magpies
- Draft: No. 37, 2021 draft
- Debut: Round 1, 2022 season 6, Greater Western Sydney vs. Gold Coast, at Great Barrier Reef Arena
- Height: 190 cm (6 ft 3 in)
- Position: Ruck

Club information
- Current club: Sydney
- Number: 7

Playing career^{1}
Years	Club	Games (Goals)
2022 (S6)	Greater Western Sydney	7 (0)
2022 (S7)–	Sydney	16 (4)
Total		23 (4)
- ^{1} Playing statistics correct to the end of the 2023 season.

Career highlights
- All-Australian team: 2023; Rising Star runner-up: 2023; 22under22 team: 2023

Ally Morphett (born 11 November 2003) is an Australian rules footballer playing for the Sydney Swans in the AFL Women's (AFLW). She previously played for the Greater Western Sydney Giants in 2022 season 6.

At 190cm, Morphett is a ruck noted for her physicality in contests, long kicking ability, and strong marking.

== Early life ==
Morphett grew up on a farm at Gumly Gumly, a small town on the outskirts of Wagga Wagga in the New South Wales Riverina. She participated in the sport of Barrel racing as a teenager including winning a junior national title. After taking up Australian rules at the age of 15 at Wagga High School, she played locally for East Wagga-Kooringal before joining the Murray Bushrangers - U18 NAB League and later U18 Giants Academy. At the age of 17, Ally was also selected in the U18 NAB National Academy, further developing the young footballer. Due to the Covid pandemic, any further development was halted, leaving Ally the only option to join the Belconnen Magpies in the AFL Canberra women’s competition for whom she was awarded best-on-ground in a grand final victory aged 16 in 2020. As a junior, Morphett played representatively for the U15 NSW Schools State team in Adelaide SA at the All Schools National Competition, with only 6 games in Ally's repertoire her selection to the U15 All Schools - All Australian Team was the driving force behind Ally’s football journey. Ally was captain of the Allies at the 2021 Under-19 national championships.

== AFL Women's career ==
=== Greater Western Sydney (2022 season 6) ===
Morphett was drafted by Greater Western Sydney with pick 37 in the 2021 AFL Women's draft, the first selection in the NSW pool. She debuted for the Giants in round one of 2022 season six and played each of their first seven games that season, without making any significant impact. She was then traded to expansion side Sydney at the end of the season in exchange for pick 29 in the 2022 draft.

=== Sydney (2022 season 7–present) ===
A passionate Swans supporter growing up, Morphett made her debut for the club in its inaugural AFLW game against St Kilda at North Sydney Oval. She played nine games in season 7 (2022) as the side's number one ruck and competed strongly but was not dominant. In the subsequent off-season, Morphett lost almost 10kg having worked hard on her fitness, and she has credited this work and a challenge from coach Scott Gowans for her form the following season.

Morphett produced a breakout performance in round one of 2023 with 18 disposals, 29 hitouts and a goal in the Swans' maiden AFLW victory against her former side at North Sydney Oval, earning her a rising star nomination and the maximum 10 AFLCA votes. Following this, Morphett quickly established herself as the dominant ruck in the competition including another starring performance in a win over West Coast in round four before a wrist injury prematurely ended her season after just seven games. She was the leading ruck in the competition for disposals, hitouts, clearances and contested possessions per game.

Morphett earned selection as the All-Australian ruck for 2023 and was runner-up by a solitary vote for the Rising Star award despite her injury. She was also named in the AFL Players Association's 22under22 team. In November, she re-signed with Sydney for a further four years amid reports of a lucrative contract offer from the Western Bulldogs.
