= Lexi Hamilton =

Australian rules footballer (born 2000)

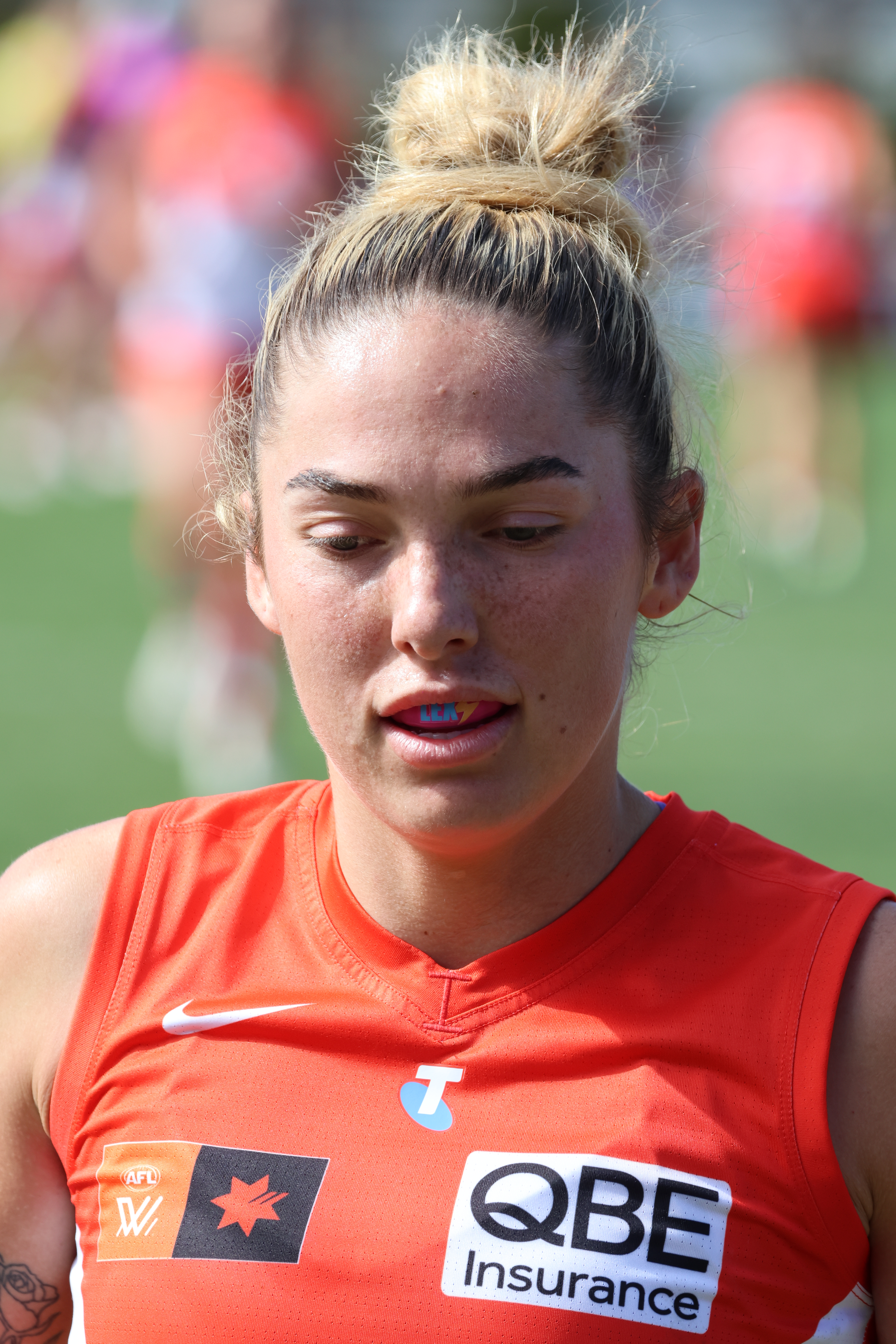
- Hamilton in August 2026

Personal information
- Full name: Alexia Hamilton
- Nickname: Lexi
- Born: 19 October 2000 (age 26); Canberra
- Original team: Canberra (AFL Canberra)
- Draft: No. 38, 2019 AFL Women's draft
- Debut: Round 1, 2020, Gold Coast vs. Greater Western Sydney, at Blacktown ISP Oval
- Height: 180 cm (5 ft 11 in)
- Position: Forward

Club information
- Current club: Sydney
- Number: 30

Playing career^{1}
Years	Club	Games (Goals)
2020	Gold Coast	1 (0)
2022 (S6)	North Melbourne	2 (0)
2022 (S7)–	Sydney	40 (6)
Total		43 (6)
- ^{1} Playing statistics correct to the end of the 2025 season.

Alexia "Lexi" Hamilton (born 19 October 2000) is a professional Australian rules footballer who plays for Sydney in the AFL Women's (AFLW), having previously played for the Gold Coast Suns and for North Melbourne. Alexia also previously was a member of the Australian Judo team, competing in the 2017 Cadet World Championships, Santiago, Chile.

== Early life ==
Hamilton was born and raised in Canberra in the Australian Capital Territory. She played her junior and senior football with the Queanbeyan Tigers before going on to play with the Canberra Football Club in the NEAFL competition and joining the GWS Giants Academy program. Hamilton also graduated at the Australian Catholic University, in which she studied a double degree in Nursing and Paramedicine.

Her sister, Cynthia also plays for the Sydney Swans.

== AFLW career ==
Hamilton was drafted by Gold Coast with their third selection and thirty-eighth overall in the 2019 AFL Women's draft. She made her debut against Greater Western Sydney at Blacktown ISP Oval in the opening round of the 2020 season. In August 2020 during the COVID-19 pandemic, she was delisted and returned to Canberra. In late 2021, Alexia was resigned by North Melbourne and played 2 games during their 2022 season 6 campaign. In May 2022, Hamilton joined expansion club Sydney and played 10 games.
