= Cynthia Hamilton =

Australian rules footballer

Personal information
- Born: 2 April 2004 (age 22)
- Original team: Queanbeyan (AFL Canberra)
- Draft: No. 11, 2022 AFL Women's draft
- Height: 168 cm (5 ft 6 in)
- Position: Midfielder/forward

Club information
- Current club: Sydney
- Number: 10

Playing career^{1}
Years	Club	Games (Goals)
2022 (S7)–	Sydney	21 (10)
- ^{1} Playing statistics correct to the end of the 2023 season.

Career highlights
- Sydney Club Champion: 2022 (S7); AFL Women's Rising Star nominee: 2022 (S7)

Cynthia Hamilton (born 2 April 2004) is an Australian rules footballer who plays for Sydney in the AFL Women's (AFLW). She won Sydney's best and fairest award in 2022 season 7, the club's inaugural AFLW season.

== Football ==
=== Pre-AFLW ===
Before her time in the AFLW, Hamilton played numerous sports including judo (in which she was a national junior representative), basketball and OzTag. She began playing Australian football at the age of 10. She played for Belconnen then Queanbeyan in AFL Canberra competitions, and was a member of the Greater Western Sydney Giants Academy.

She played for the Allies at both the 2021 and 2022 underage championships. She was named in All-Australian squads at both and won the Allies MVP award at the former.

=== AFLW ===
Hamilton was drafted by Sydney with pick 11 in the 2022 AFL Women's draft. She played nine games and scored three goals in her debut season, receiving a Rising Star nomination for a 19-disposal effort in the final round of the home-and-away season. That year, she won Sydney's inaugural AFLW best and fairest award.

== Personal life ==
Hamilton was born on 2 April 2004, daughter of Josie and Kelly Hamilton. Her older sister Lexi has played for Gold Coast and North Melbourne in the AFLW, and currently plays alongside her at Sydney. Another older sister, Jayde, has played in the VFL Women's for North Melbourne.
