= 2022 AFL Women's season 7 Rising Star =

- Sponsored by: National Australia Bank
- Date: 22 November 2022
- Venue: Crown Melbourne
- Hosted by: Sarah Jones
- Winner: Hannah Ewings (Port Adelaide)

Television/radio coverage
- Network: Fox Footy

The 2022 AFL Women's season 7 Rising Star award was presented to the player adjudged the best young player during 2022 AFL Women's season 7. Port Adelaide's Hannah Ewings won the award with 41 votes.

== Eligibility ==
To be eligible for nomination, players must be under 21 years of age before the start of the season and not be suspended during the season.

== Nominations ==
Table of nominees
Round	Player	Club	Ref.
1	Abbey Dowrick	Port Adelaide	
1	Paige Scott	Essendon	
2	Abbie Ballard	Adelaide	
2	Daisy D'Arcy	Gold Coast	
3	Hannah Ewings	Port Adelaide	
3	Rylie Wilcox	Western Bulldogs	
4	Montana Ham	Sydney	
4	Keeley Skepper	Carlton	
5	Jasmine Fleming	Hawthorn	
5	Sarah Lakay	West Coast	
6	Emily Pease	Greater Western Sydney	
6	Ella Roberts	West Coast	
7	Charlie Thomas	West Coast	
7	Lucy Wales	Hawthorn	
8	Tarni Evans	Greater Western Sydney	
8	Steph Wales	Essendon	
9	Tahlia Gillard	Melbourne	
9	Sofia Hurley	Sydney	
10	Cynthia Hamilton	Sydney	
10	Indy Tahau	Port Adelaide	

Table of nominations by club
Number	Club	Player	Rd.
3	Port Adelaide	Abbey Dowrick	1
3	Port Adelaide	Hannah Ewings	3
3	Port Adelaide	Indy Tahau	10
3	Sydney	Montana Ham	4
3	Sydney	Sofia Hurley	9
3	Sydney	Cynthia Hamilton	10
3	West Coast	Sarah Lakay	5
3	West Coast	Ella Roberts	6
3	West Coast	Charlie Thomas	7
2	Essendon	Paige Scott	1
2	Essendon	Steph Wales	8
2	Greater Western Sydney	Emily Pease	6
2	Greater Western Sydney	Tarni Evans	8
2	Hawthorn	Jasmine Fleming	5
2	Hawthorn	Lucy Wales	7
1	Adelaide	Abbie Ballard	2
1	Carlton	Keeley Skepper	4
1	Gold Coast	Daisy D'Arcy	2
1	Melbourne	Tahlia Gillard	9
1	Western Bulldogs	Rylie Wilcox	3

== Final voting ==
Table of votes
Placing	Player	Club	Nom.	Votes
1	Hannah Ewings	Port Adelaide	3	41
2	Abbey Dowrick	Port Adelaide	1	32
3	Jasmine Fleming	Hawthorn	5	17
4	Ella Roberts	West Coast	6	15
5	Rylie Wilcox	Western Bulldogs	3	10
