= Lucy Wales =

Australian rules footballer

Personal information
- Full name: Lucy Margaret Wales
- Born: 30 May 2003 (age 23)
- Original team: Casey Demons (VFLW)
- Draft: No. 22, 2022 national draft
- Debut: 27 August 2022, Hawthorn vs. Essendon, at Docklands Stadium
- Height: 184 cm (6 ft 0 in)
- Position: Ruck

Club information
- Current club: Hawthorn
- Number: 31

Playing career^{1}
Years	Club	Games (Goals)
2022 (S7)–	Hawthorn	41 (0)
- ^{1} Playing statistics correct to the end of 2025.

Lucy Margaret Wales is an Australian rules footballer playing for Hawthorn in the AFL Women's league. Wales was recruited by Hawthorn with the 22nd pick in the 2022 AFL Women's draft. She is the twin sister of Essendon player Stephanie Wales.

== AFLW career ==
Wales debuted for the Hawks in the opening round of 2022 season 7, playing in the inaugural team. On debut, she collected 7 disposals and 12 hitouts. Wales earned a rising star nomination in round 7, after a 17 hitout, 10 disposal game against Port Adelaide.

== Statistics ==
Updated to the end of 2025.

Legend
G	Goals	K	Kicks	D	Disposals	T	Tackles
B	Behinds	H	Handballs	M	Marks	H/O	Hit-outs

Season	Team	No.	Games	Totals								Averages (per game)								Votes
Season	Team	No.	Games	G	B	K	H	D	M	T	H/O	G	B	K	H	D	M	T	H/O	Votes
2022 (S7)	Hawthorn	31	10	0	0	57	40	97	14	44	168	0.0	0.0	5.7	4.0	9.7	1.4	4.4	16.8	1
2023	Hawthorn	31	9	0	0	52	42	94	13	45	142	0.0	0.0	5.8	4.7	10.4	1.4	5.0	15.8	0
2024	Hawthorn	31	13	0	1	83	72	155	30	58	336	0.0	0.1	6.4	5.5	11.9	2.3	4.5	25.8	2
2025	Hawthorn	31	9	0	1	91	74	165	25	53	180	0.0	0.1	10.1	8.2	18.3	2.8	5.9	20.0	0
Career			41	0	2	283	228	511	82	200	826	0.0	0.0	6.9	5.6	12.5	2.0	4.9	20.1	3

== Honours and achievements ==
Team

- McClelland Trophy (Hawthorn): 2024

Individual

- 2× AFL Women's Rising Star nominee: S7, 2023
