= Abbey Dowrick =

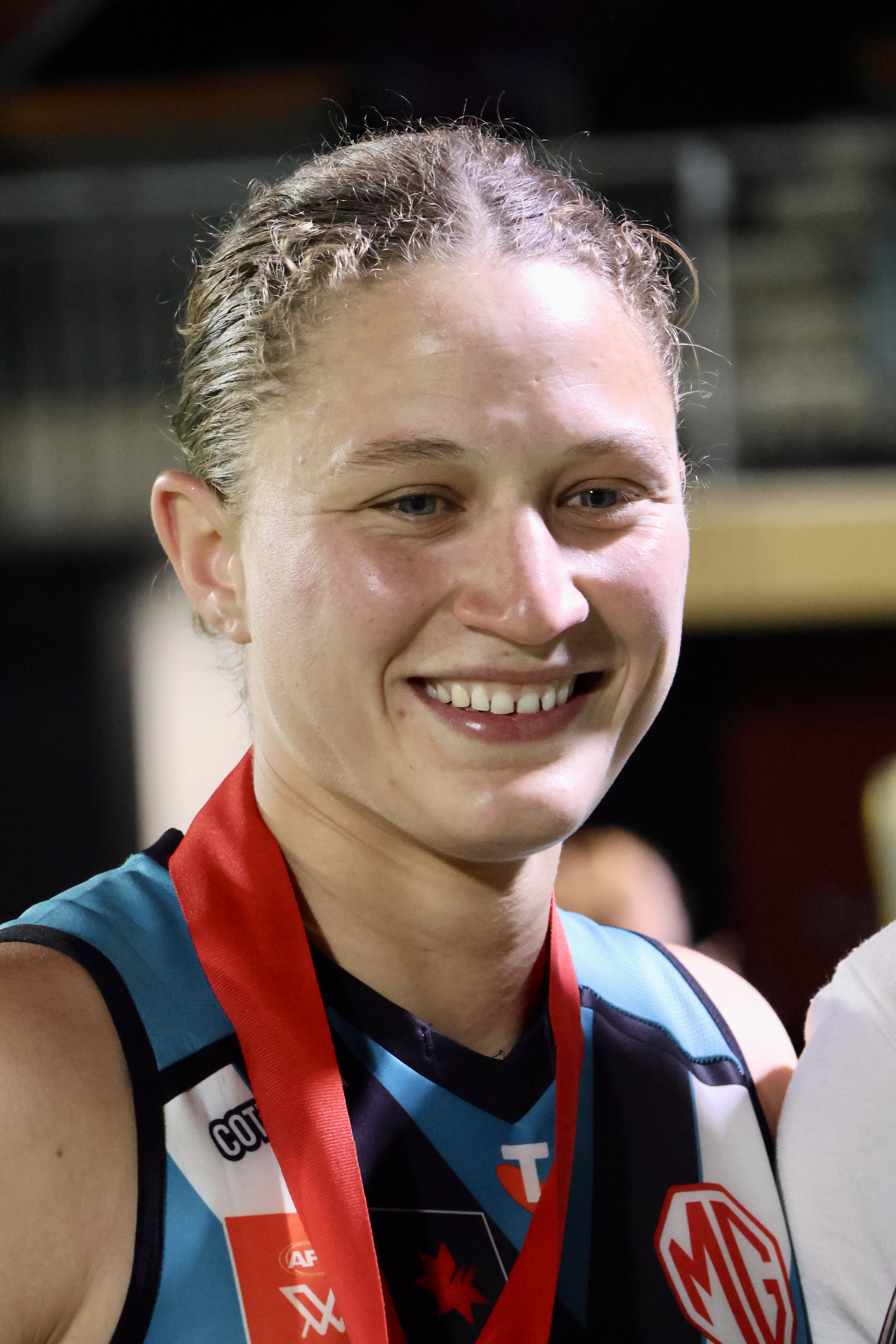
- Dowrick with Port Adelaide in 2025

Personal information
- Born: 23 September 2002 (age 24); Kalgoorlie, Western Australia
- Height: 165 cm (5 ft 5 in)
- Position: Midfielder

Club information
- Current club: Port Adelaide
- Number: 5

Playing career^{1}
Years	Club	Games (Goals)
S7 (2022)–	Port Adelaide	53 (13)
- ^{1} Playing statistics correct to the end of Rd 9, 2026 season.

Career highlights
- Port Adelaide best and fairest: 2023; 2× Showdown Medal: 2025, 2026; Rising Star nomination: 2022

Abbey Dowrick (born 23 September 2002) is an Australian rules footballer for Port Adelaide in the AFL Women's competition.

Dowrick played junior football for the Mines Rovers in the Goldfields Football League and was selected in the 2019 Western Australian under-18 team.

Dowrick's sister McKenzie Dowrick plays for the Adelaide Crows and Dowrick's partner is fellow Port player Matilda Scholz.
