= Kiera Mueller =

Australian rules footballer

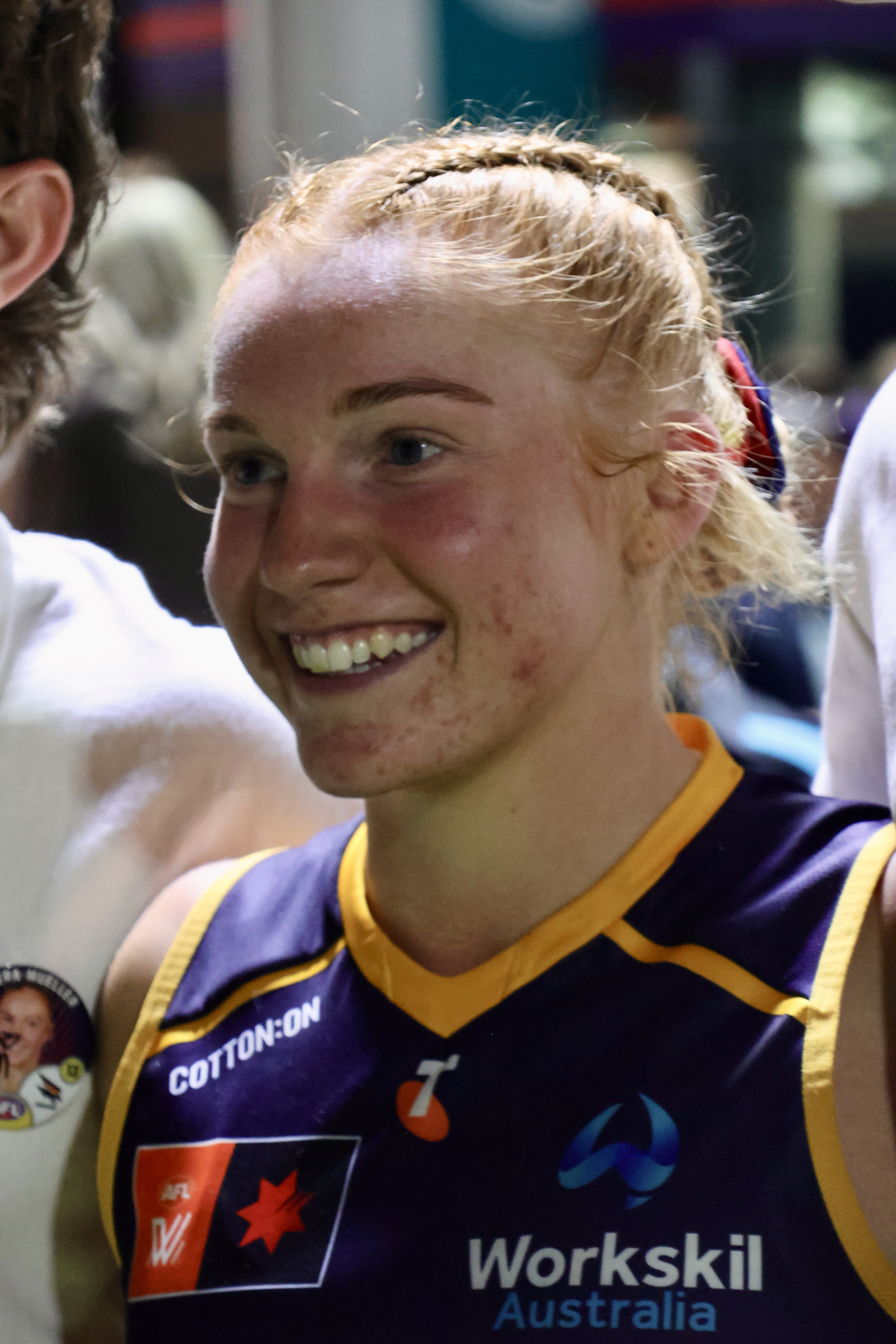
- Mueller with Adelaide in 2025

Personal information
- Born: 21 April 2003 (age 23)
- Original team: Sturt Football Club (SANFLW)
- Draft: No. 69, 2022 draft
- Debut: Round 7, 2022 (S7), Adelaide
- Height: 167 cm (5 ft 6 in)
- Position: Defender

Playing career^{1}
Years	Club	Games (Goals)
2022–2026	Adelaide	37 (0)
- ^{1} Playing statistics correct to the end of 2026.

Career highlights
- Rising Star nominee: 2023; 22under22 extended squad: 2023

Kiera Mueller (born 21 April 2003) is a former Australian rules footballer who played for the Adelaide Crows in the AFL Women's (AFLW).

== Early life ==
Mueller grew up in South Australia and was involved in a range of sports including netball, gymnastics and jump rope, before taking up football in 2017 with the Blackwood Football Club.

She played for Sturt in the SANFL Women's leagues and was later part of the Adelaide Crows Academy. In 2021, she represented South Australia at the AFLW Under-18 Championships.

== AFLW career ==
Mueller was selected by Adelaide with pick 69 in the 2022 draft. She made her senior debut in round seven of season 7 (2022) and became a consistent member of the Crows' backline, playing every match after her debut.

In 2023, Mueller earned a Rising Star nomination after a strong performance in round seven, where she recorded 12 disposals at 92 percent efficiency against the Western Bulldogs. She continued her form into 2024 and re-signed with Adelaide at the end of the season, committing to the club until 2025.

In round one, 2026, Mueller injured the patella tendon in her right knee, ruling her out for the remainder of the year. At the conclusion of the season, she was delisted by the Crows following 37 games for the club.

== Statistics ==
Updated to the end of the 2024 season

Legend
G	Goals	K	Kicks	D	Disposals	T	Tackles
B	Behinds	H	Handballs	M	Marks

Season	Team	No.	Games	Totals							Averages (per game)							Votes
Season	Team	No.	Games	G	B	K	H	D	M	T	G	B	K	H	D	M	T	Votes
2022 (S7)	Adelaide	13	5	0	0	14	11	25	3	11	0.0	0.0	2.8	2.2	5.0	0.6	2.2	0
2023	Adelaide	13	12	0	0	73	48	121	29	15	0.0	0.0	6.1	4.0	10.1	2.4	1.3	0
2024	Adelaide	13	10	0	0	35	31	66	13	18	0.0	0.0	3.5	3.1	6.6	1.3	1.8	0
2025	Adelaide	13	9	0	0	40	28	68	8	22	0.0	0.0	4.4	3.1	7.6	0.9	2.4	0
2026	Adelaide	13	1	0	0	0	0	0	0	1	0.0	0.0	0.0	0.0	0.0	0.0	1.0	0
Career			37	0	0	162	118	280	53	67	0.0	0.0	4.4	3.2	7.6	1.4	1.8	0

== Personal life ==
Mueller has spoken publicly about living with coeliac disease, which she was diagnosed with at age 17, as well as endometriosis. She has used her platform to raise awareness about these conditions and how they impact athletes.
