= Ella Heads =

Australian rules footballer

Personal information
- Full name: Ella Heads
- Born: 24 June 2003 (age 23)
- Original team: Inner West Magpies
- Debut: Round 1, 2022 season 7, Sydney vs. St Kilda, at North Sydney Oval
- Height: 175 cm (5 ft 9 in)
- Position: Defender

Club information
- Current club: Port Adelaide
- Number: 12

Playing career^{1}
Years	Club	Games (Goals)
2022 (S7)–2024	Sydney	33 (1)
2025–	Port Adelaide	12 (2)
- ^{1} Playing statistics correct to the end of the 2025 season.

Career highlights
- Rising Star nominee: 2023; 2× 22under22 team: 2023, 2025

Ella Heads (born 24 June 2003) is an Australian rules footballer playing for Port Adelaide Football Club in the AFL Women's (AFLW).

Heads is a Sydney local who was signed by the Swans ahead of their inaugural season in 2022 having previously played for the Inner West Magpies—where she won the club's under-18 best and fairest in 2020—and the Swans academy. A forward as a junior, Heads is a rebounding defender with a long kick and a strong intercept mark.

== AFL Women's career ==
Debuting in the Swans' first ever AFLW game, Heads played all 10 games in 2022 season 7 to finish fifth in club's best and fairest.

She again played every game in 2023 as the club reached its maiden AFLW finals series. This made her one of only three players to play all 22 games in Sydney's first two seasons. Her improvement throughout the season was marked by a rising star nomination in round 5 for her 18 disposals and 10 marks against Carlton. She was then named in the AFL Players Association's 22under22 team at the conclusion of the season.

During the 2024 Trade Period, Heads was traded to Port Adelaide as a part of a 4-team trade between Port Adelaide, Sydney, Brisbane and Essendon that also saw Essendon defender Ash Van Loon get traded to the Swans.
