= Steph Wales =

Australian rules footballer

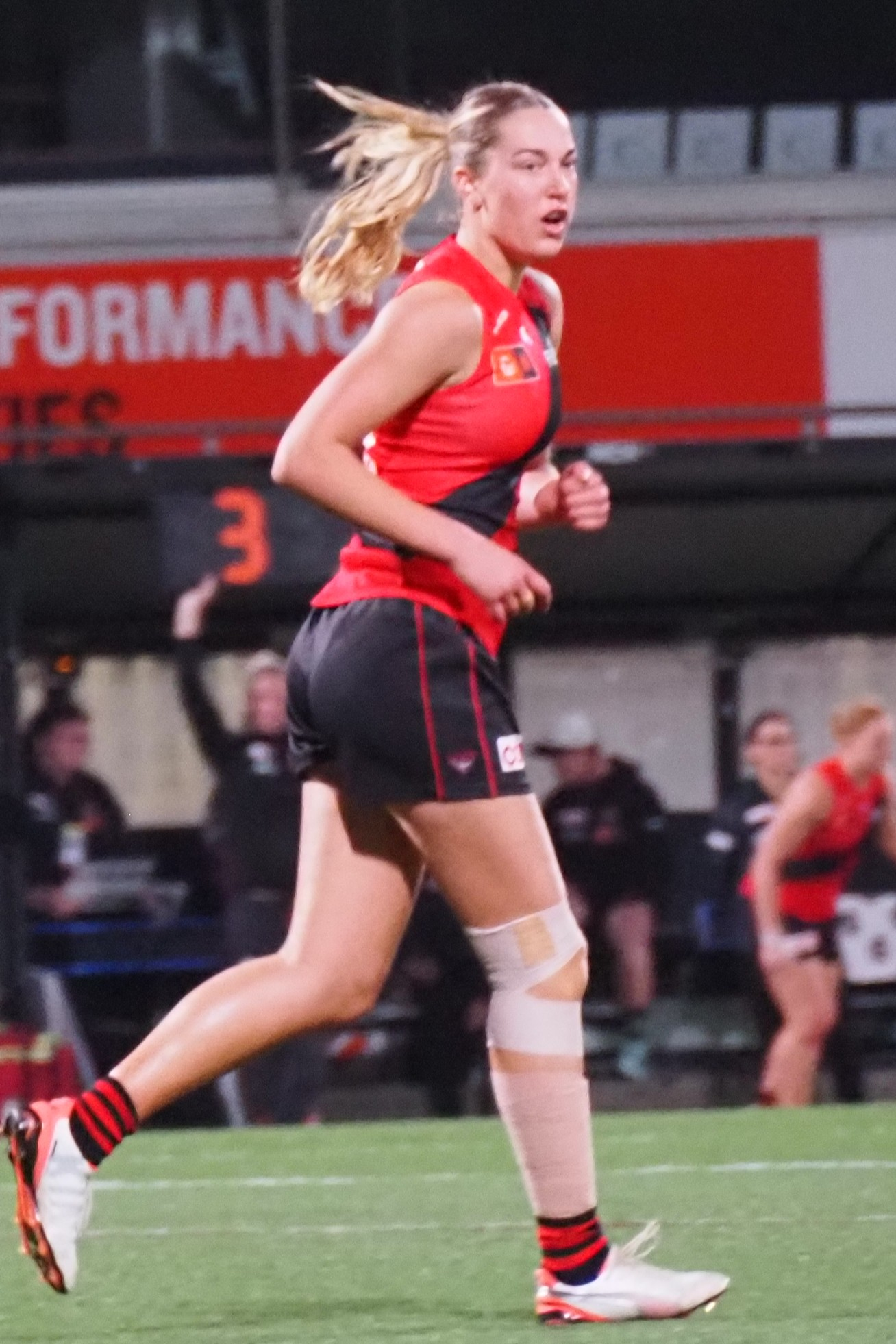
- Wales playing for Essendon in 2025

Personal information
- Full name: Stephanie Wales
- Born: 30 May 2003 (age 23)
- Original team: Casey (VFLW)
- Draft: No. 32, 2022 national draft
- Debut: Round 1, 2022 (S7), Essendon vs. Hawthorn, at Marvel Stadium
- Height: 188 cm (6 ft 2 in)
- Position: Ruck / Key forward

Club information
- Current club: Essendon
- Number: 30

Playing career^{1}
Years	Club	Games (Goals)
2022 (S7)–	Essendon	21 (4)
- ^{1} Playing statistics correct to the end of the 2023 season.

Career highlights
- AFL Women's Rising Star nominee: 2022 (S7)

Stephanie Wales is an Australian rules footballer playing for the Essendon Football Club in the AFL Women's (AFLW). Wales was recruited by Essendon with the 32nd pick in the 2022 AFL Women's draft. She is the twin sister of Hawthorn player Lucy Wales.

== AFL Women's career ==
Wales debuted for the Bombers in the opening round of 2022 season 7, playing in Essendon's inaugural AFL Women's team. On debut, she collected four disposals and 12 hitouts. Wales earned a nomination for the 2022 AFL Women's season 7 Rising Star award in round 8 after accumulating 21 hitouts and seven tackles against Sydney.

== Statistics ==
Updated to the end of round 9, 2022 (S7).

Legend
G	Goals	K	Kicks	D	Disposals	T	Tackles
B	Behinds	H	Handballs	M	Marks	H/O	Hit-outs

Season	Team	No.	Games	Totals								Averages (per game)								Votes
Season	Team	No.	Games	G	B	K	H	D	M	T	H/O	G	B	K	H	D	M	T	H/O	Votes
2022 (S7)	Essendon	30	9	3	1	45	40	85	7	20	112	0.3	0.1	5.0	4.4	9.4	0.8	2.2	12.4	
Career			9	3	1	45	40	85	7	20	112	0.3	0.1	5.0	4.4	9.4	0.8	2.2	12.4	

== Honours and achievements ==
- AFL Women's Rising Star nominee: 2022 (S7)
