= Louise Stephenson =

Australian rules footballer

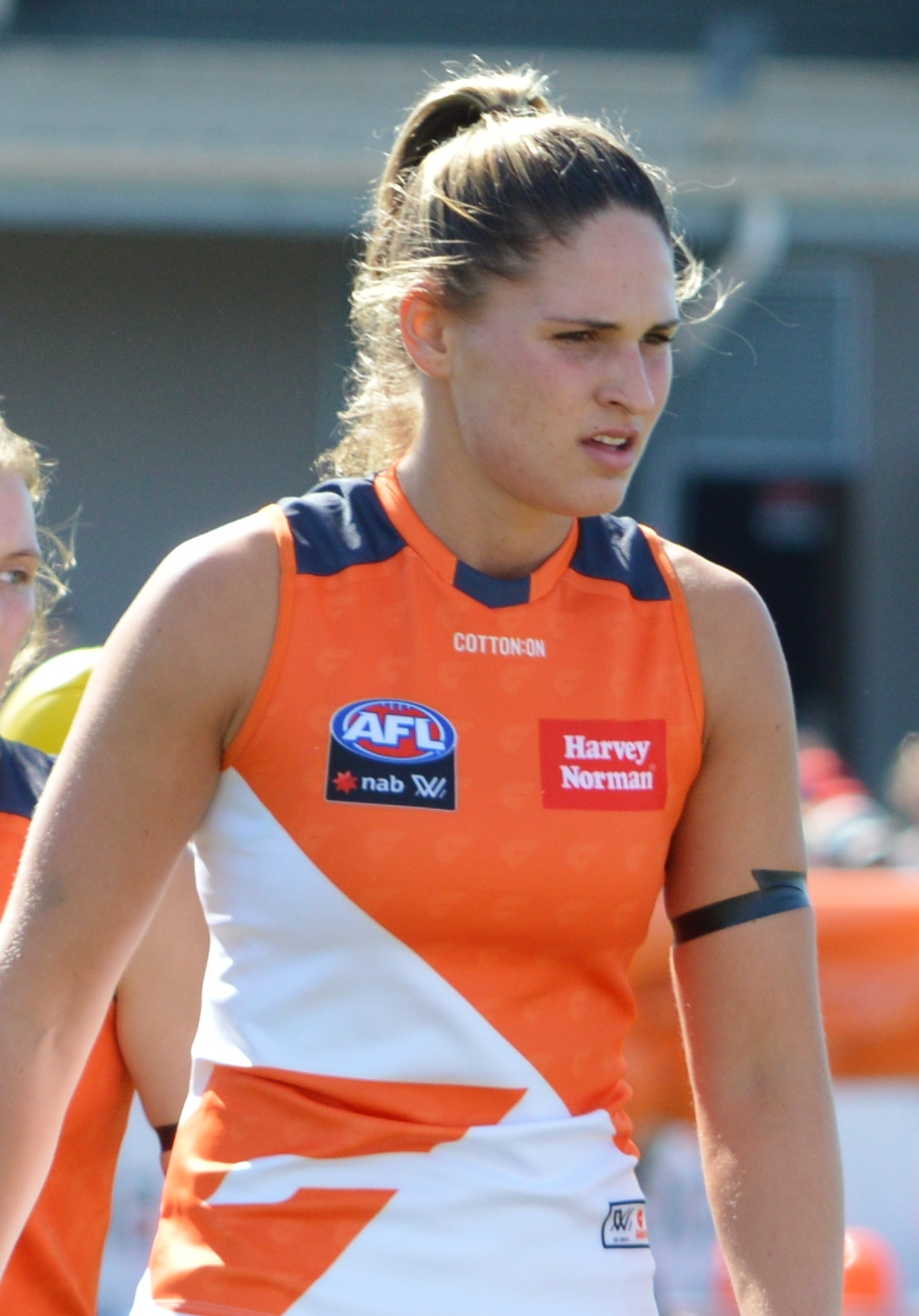
- Stephenson playing for Greater Western Sydney in February 2018

Personal information
- Born: 9 July 1995 (age 31)
- Original team: Melbourne University (VFL Women's)
- Debut: Round 5, 2017, Greater Western Sydney vs. Melbourne, at Blacktown ISP Oval
- Height: 178 cm (5 ft 10 in)
- Position: Forward / ruck

Club information
- Current club: Hawthorn
- Number: 12

Playing career^{1}
Years	Club	Games (Goals)
2017–2022 (S6)	Greater Western Sydney	33 (4)
2022 (S7)–2024	Hawthorn	17 (5)
2025–	Western Bulldogs	11 (4)
Total		61 (13)
- ^{1} Playing statistics correct to the end of 2025.

Louise Stephenson (born 9 July 1995) is an Australian rules footballer playing for the Western Bulldogs in the AFL Women's competition. Stephenson was recruited by Greater Western Sydney as a priority player in September 2016. She made her debut in the five point win against Melbourne at Blacktown ISP Oval in round five of the 2017 season. She played three matches in her debut season.

== Statistics ==
Updated to the end of 2024

Legend
G	Goals	K	Kicks	D	Disposals	T	Tackles
B	Behinds	H	Handballs	M	Marks

Season	Team	No.	Games	Totals							Averages (per game)							Votes
Season	Team	No.	Games	G	B	K	H	D	M	T	G	B	K	H	D	M	T	Votes
2017	Greater Western Sydney	12	3	0	0	10	6	16	4	1	0.0	0.0	3.3	2.0	5.3	1.3	0.3	2
2018	Greater Western Sydney	12	2	0	0	5	1	6	1	3	0.0	0.0	2.5	0.5	3.0	0.5	1.5	0
2019	Greater Western Sydney	12	7	1	0	30	37	67	10	13	0.1	0.0	4.3	5.3	9.6	1.4	1.9	0
2020	Greater Western Sydney	12	7	0	0	37	23	60	8	15	0.0	0.0	5.3	3.3	8.6	1.1	2.1	0
2021	Greater Western Sydney	12	7	0	0	45	17	62	15	14	0.0	0.0	6.4	2.4	8.9	2.1	2.0	0
2022 (S6)	Greater Western Sydney	12	7	3	0	33	19	52	15	17	0.4	0.0	4.7	2.7	7.4	2.1	2.4	0
2022 (S7)	Hawthorn	12	3	0	0	7	13	20	3	10	0.0	0.0	2.3	4.3	6.7	1.0	3.3	0
2023	Hawthorn	12	6	0	0	32	16	48	15	13	0.0	0.0	5.3	2.7	8.0	2.5	2.2	0
2024	Hawthorn	12	8	5	3	39	24	63	9	28	0.6	0.4	4.9	3.0	7.9	1.1	3.5	0
Career			50	9	3	238	156	394	80	114	0.2	0.1	4.8	3.1	7.9	1.6	2.3	2

== Honours and achievements ==
Team

- McClelland Trophy (Hawthorn): 2024
