= Paige Scott =

Australian rules footballer

Personal information
- Full name: Paige Scott
- Born: 25 June 2004 (age 22)
- Original team: Greater Western Victoria Rebels (NAB League Girls)
- Draft: No. 8, 2022 national draft No. 31, 2024 national draft
- Debut: Round 1, 2022 (S7), Essendon vs. Hawthorn, at Marvel Stadium
- Height: 169 cm (5 ft 7 in)
- Position: Forward

Club information
- Current club: Richmond
- Number: 5

Playing career^{1}
Years	Club	Games (Goals)
2022 (S7)–2024	Essendon	28 (12)
2025–	Richmond	11 (3)
Total		39 (15)
- ^{1} Playing statistics correct to the end of the 2025 season.

Career highlights
- AFL Women's Rising Star nominee: 2022 (S7)

Paige Scott (born 25 June 2004) is an Australian rules footballer playing for Richmond in the AFL Women's (AFLW). They previously played for Essendon.

== AFL Women's career ==
Scott was recruited by Essendon with the eighth pick in the 2022 AFL Women's draft. They debuted for the Bombers in the opening round of 2022 season 7, playing in Essendon's inaugural AFL Women's team. On debut, Scott collected 16 disposals and a goal, earning a nomination for the 2022 AFL Women's season 7 Rising Star award.

At the end of the 2024 season, Scott requested a trade away from Essendon. When a trade did not materialise, they "delisted themselves" from the Bombers and nominated for the upcoming draft. Richmond then selected them in the draft with pick 31.

== Personal life ==
Scott uses they/them pronouns.

== Statistics ==
Updated to the end of round 9, 2022 (S7).

Legend
G	Goals	K	Kicks	D	Disposals	T	Tackles
B	Behinds	H	Handballs	M	Marks

Season	Team	No.	Games	Totals							Averages (per game)							Votes
Season	Team	No.	Games	G	B	K	H	D	M	T	G	B	K	H	D	M	T	Votes
2022 (S7)	Essendon	32	9	7	5	55	30	85	21	21	0.8	0.6	6.1	3.3	9.4	2.3	2.3	
Career			9	7	5	55	30	85	21	21	0.8	0.6	6.1	3.3	9.4	2.3	2.3	

== Honours and achievements ==
- AFL Women's Rising Star nominee: 2022 (S7)
