= Rylie Wilcox =

Australian rules footballer

Personal information
- Full name: Rylie Madison Wilcox
- Born: 3 December 2004 (age 21)
- Draft: No. 22, 2022 national draft
- Debut: Round 1, S7, Western Bulldogs vs. Greater Western Sydney, at Ikon Park
- Height: 158 cm (5 ft 2 in)
- Position: Midfielder / Small forward

Club information
- Current club: Western Bulldogs
- Number: 37

Playing career^{1}
Years	Club	Games (Goals)
2022 (S7)–	Western Bulldogs	50 (17)
- ^{1} Playing statistics correct to the end of the 2026 season.

Career highlights
- AFL Women's Rising Star nominee: S7

Rylie Madison Wilcox (born 3 December 2004) is an Australian rules footballer playing for the Western Bulldogs Football Club in the AFL Women's (AFLW). Wilcox was recruited by the Bulldogs with the 22nd pick in the 2022 AFL Women's draft.

== Early life ==
Wilcox played for the Northern Knights in the NAB League Girls for the 2021 and 2022 seasons. Wilcox was noted as a very 'crafty' prospect who can play as a small forward or on the wing. After averaging 16 disposals and kicking 2 goals from her three games for Vic Metro in the 2022 AFL Women's Under-19 Championships, Wilcox was named in the 2022 AFLW National Championships All-Australian team on the interchange bench.

== AFL Women's career ==
Wilcox debuted for the Western Bulldogs in the opening round of 2022 AFL Women's season 7, against Greater Western Sydney. On debut, Wilcox collected 13 disposals and 2 marks. Wilcox earned a Rising star nomination after her round 3 performance against Fremantle after her 11 disposals and a goal helped the Bulldogs to continue their unbeaten streak. At the conclusion of the year, Wilcox finished in the top 5 of the 2022 AFL Women's season 7 Rising Star count, gaining 10 votes. She was also nominated for the 22 Under 22 team, but did not make a place in the final team.

=== Statistics ===
Updated to the end of round 9 2026.

Legend
G	Goals	K	Kicks	D	Disposals	T	Tackles
B	Behinds	H	Handballs	M	Marks

Season	Team	No.	Games	Totals							Averages (per game)							Votes
Season	Team	No.	Games	G	B	K	H	D	M	T	G	B	K	H	D	M	T	Votes
2022 (S7)	Western Bulldogs	37	10	5	3	74	32	106	18	22	0.5	0.3	7.4	3.2	10.6	1.8	2.2	0
2023	Western Bulldogs	37	9	2	4	73	39	112	26	21	0.2	0.4	8.1	4.3	12.4	2.9	2.3	1
2024	Western Bulldogs	37	11	0	1	76	26	102	18	19	0.0	0.1	6.9	2.4	9.3	1.6	1.7	5
2025	Western Bulldogs	37	11	5	0	112	43	155	27	36	0.5	0.0	10.2	3.9	14.1	2.5	3.3	2
2026	Western Bulldogs	37	9	5	4	85	44	129	24	18	0.6	0.4	9.4	4.9	14.3	2.7	2.0	
Career			50	17	12	420	184	604	113	116	0.3	0.2	8.4	3.7	12.1	2.3	2.3	8

== Honours and achievements ==
- AFL Women's Rising Star nominee: S7
