= Hannah Ewings =

Australian rules footballer

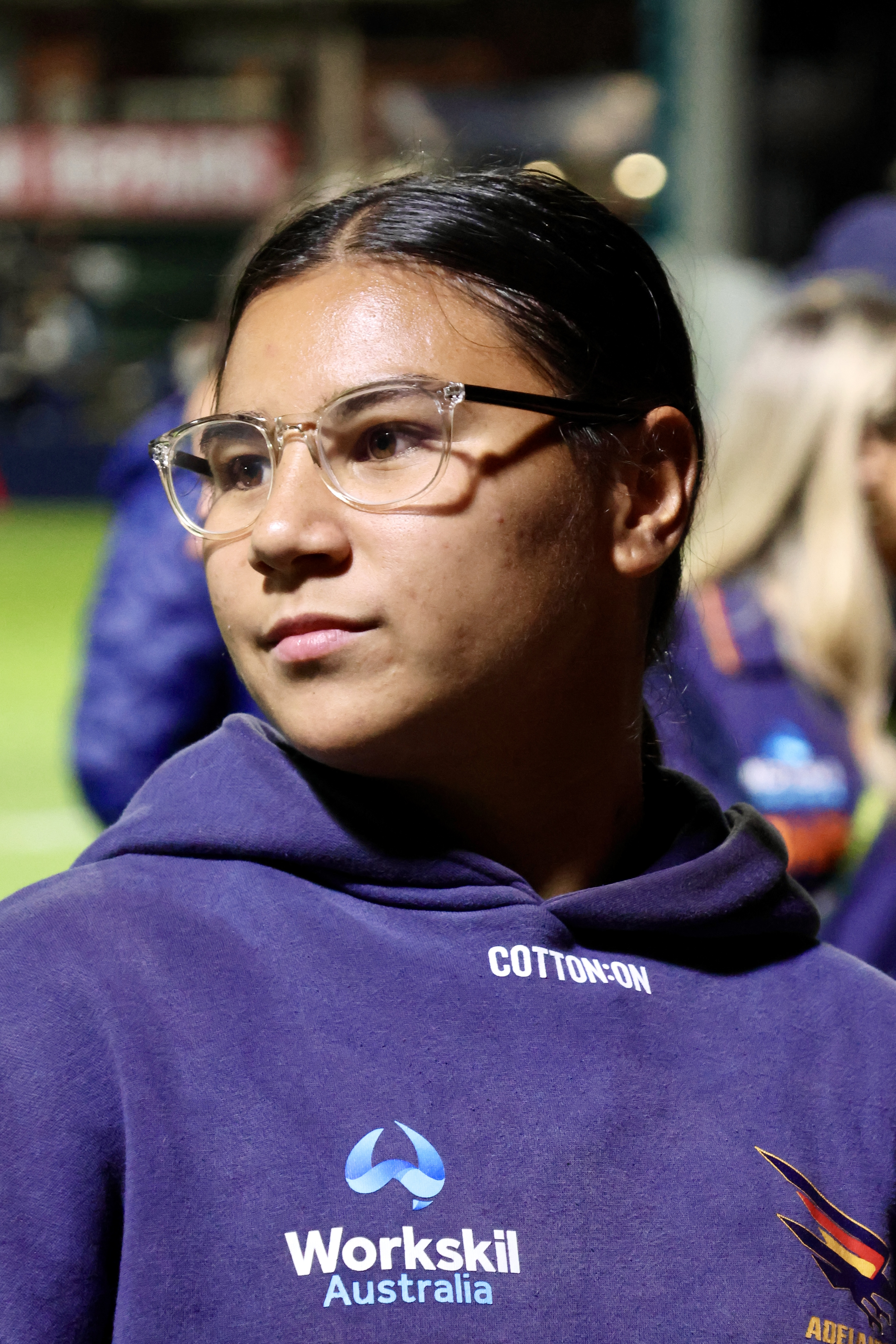
- Ewings in 2025

Personal information
- Nicknames: Han, Ewy
- Born: 17 March 2004 (age 22)
- Original team: North Adelaide (SANFL)
- Draft: No. 3, 2022 draft
- Debut: Round 1, 2022 (Season 7), Port Adelaide vs. West Coast, at Mineral Resources Park
- Height: 167 cm (5 ft 6 in)
- Position: Midfielder

Playing career^{1}
Years	Club	Games (Goals)
2022 (S7)–2024	Port Adelaide	18 (8)
2025–2026	Adelaide	3 (0)
Total		21 (8)
- ^{1} Playing statistics correct to the end of 2026.

Career highlights
- AFL Women's Rising Star: 2022 (S7); Port Adelaide best and fairest: 2022 (S7); Port Adelaide leading goalkicker: 2022 (S7)

Hannah Ewings (born 17 March 2004) is a former Australian rules footballer who last played for the Adelaide Football Club in the Australian Football League Women's (AFLW) competition. She was drafted to Port Adelaide and won the AFL Women's Rising Star and club best and fairest award before she was traded to the Crows following the 2024 season.

== Early life ==
Ewings was raised in Whyalla, South Australia and began playing junior football with Roopena and SMOSH West Lakes junior football club in South Australia before playing senior football with North Adelaide in the South Australian National Football League.

== AFL Women's career ==
Ewings was taken with Port Adelaide’s first selection in the 2022 draft (number three overall) and played all 10 games in her debut season. She won the AFL Women's Rising Star award and won Port Adelaide's best and fairest. Ewings also won Port Adelaide’s Best First Year Player award and was the Power's equal top goalscorer in the club's debut AFLW season.

Following a quiet 2023 in which Ewings played 8 of a possible 10 games, she took personal leave for the 2024 season. She was traded to cross-town rivals Adelaide in the 2024 trade period.

Ewings played three games for the Crows during the 2025 AFL Women's season. After a quiet 2026 in which she did not make a senior appearance, Ewings was delisted by the club.

== Statistics ==
Updated to the end of 2026.

Legend
G	Goals	K	Kicks	D	Disposals	T	Tackles
B	Behinds	H	Handballs	M	Marks

Season	Team	No.	Games	Totals							Averages (per game)							Votes
Season	Team	No.	Games	G	B	K	H	D	M	T	G	B	K	H	D	M	T	Votes
2022 (S7)	Port Adelaide	12	10	4	4	115	24	139	9	49	0.4	0.4	11.5	2.4	13.9	0.9	4.9	7
2023	Port Adelaide	12	8	4	9	60	15	75	11	25	0.5	1.1	7.5	1.9	9.4	1.4	3.1	0
2024	Port Adelaide	12	0	–	–	–	–	–	–	–	–	–	–	–	–	–	–	–
2024	Adelaide	9	3	0	3	16	10	26	5	8	0.0	1.0	5.3	3.3	8.7	1.7	2.7	0
2026	Adelaide	9	0	–	–	–	–	–	–	–	–	–	–	–	–	–	–	–
Career			21	8	16	191	49	240	25	82	0.4	0.8	9.1	2.3	11.4	1.2	3.9	7

== Personal life ==
Ewing is of Filipino descent and also works as a chef. As of March 2026, Ewings is engaged to partner Georgia.
