= Wagga Wagga High School =

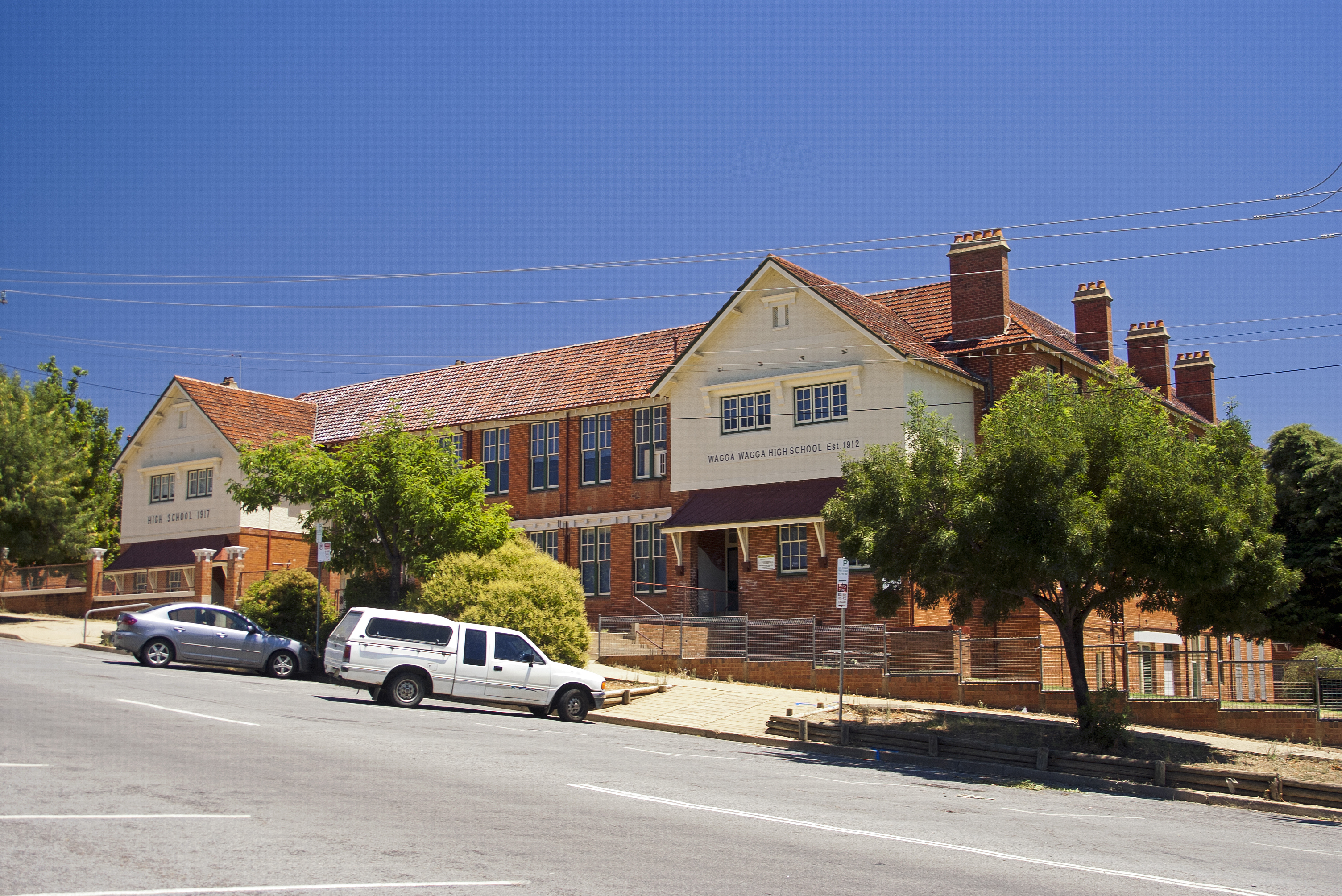
- Wagga Wagga High School, pictured in 2011

Location
- Wagga Wagga, Riverina, New South Wales; Australia; 35°7′26″S 147°21′54″E

Information
- Type: Government-funded co-educational comprehensive secondary day school
- Motto: Latin: Vincit Qui Se Vincit (Success through self-discipline)
- Established: 1912; 114 years ago
- School district: Riverina
- Educational authority: NSW Department of Education
- Principal: Chris Davies
- Teaching staff: 78.4 FTE (2018)
- Years: 7–12
- Enrolment: 1,044 (2018)
- Campus type: Regional
- Colours: Blue and white
- Website: waggawagga-h.schools.nsw.gov.au

Wagga Wagga High School (abbreviated as WWHS) is a government-funded co-educational comprehensive secondary day school, located on Coleman Street, Wagga Wagga, a city in the Riverina region of New South Wales, Australia.

Established in 1912, the school catered for approximately 1,050 students in 2018, from Year 7 to Year 12, of whom eight percent identified as Indigenous Australians and twelve percent were from a language background other than English. The school is operated by the NSW Department of Education; the principal is Chris Davies.

== Overview ==
The school was the first state secondary school established in Wagga Wagga, and is currently the oldest still operating. Wagga Wagga High School was originally located on Gurwood Street, closer to the CBD. It moved to its current site in 1917, and now serves five feeder primary schools in Wagga Wagga and the surrounding region.

== See also ==
- List of government schools in New South Wales: Q–Z
- List of schools in the Riverina
- Education in Australia
