= Darcy Moloney =

Personal information
- Born: 20 November 2002 (age 23); Colac, Victoria
- Original teams: Geelong Falcons (Talent League Girls); Colac (GFL)
- Draft: No. 10, 2020 draft
- Debut: Round 1, 2021, Geelong vs. North Melbourne, at Kardinia Park
- Height: 166 cm (5 ft 5 in)
- Position: Midfielder

Club information
- Current club: Sydney
- Number: 4

Playing career^{1}
Years	Club	Games (Goals)
2021–2024	Geelong	46 (11)
2025–	Sydney	11 (2)
Total		57 (13)
- ^{1} Playing statistics correct to the end of 2025.

Darcy Moloney (born 20 November 2002) is a professional Australian rules footballer who currently plays for the Sydney Swans in the AFL Women's (AFLW). She was initially drafted to Geelong in the 2020 AFL Women's draft, where she played 46 games.

== AFL Women's career ==
Moloney was drafted to the Geelong Cats from the Geelong Falcons with pick 10 overall in the 2020 AFL Women's draft. She made her AFL Women's debut in round 1 of the 2021 season against North Melbourne.

Following 46 games across five seasons for the club, she made the decision to request a trade to the Sydney Swans. In a move influenced by Moloney's former teammate Laura Gardiner, the trade was made official in December 2024.

She played her 50th career game early in the 2025 season.

== Personal life ==
Moloney identifies as a member of the LGBTQ community. She credits the AFLW as a large part of her journey to discovering her own identity.

She currently lives with teammate Ash Van Loon in Sydney, Australia.
