= Amber Clarke =

Australian rules footballer

Personal information
- Full name: Amber Clarke
- Born: 22 December 2004 (age 21)
- Original team: Casey Demons (VFLW) / Dandenong Stingrays (NAB League Girls)
- Draft: No. 4, 2022 national draft
- Debut: Round 1, S7, Essendon vs. Hawthorn, at Marvel Stadium
- Height: 170 cm (5 ft 7 in)
- Position: Forward

Club information
- Current club: St Kilda
- Number: 25

Playing career^{1}
Years	Club	Games (Goals)
S7 (2022)–2024	Essendon	29 (14)
2025–	St Kilda	15 (8)
- ^{1} Playing statistics correct to the end of the 2024 season.

Career highlights
- AFL Women's Rising Star nomination: 2023

Amber Clarke is an Australian rules footballer playing for the St Kilda Football Club in the AFL Women's (AFLW). Clarke was initially recruited by Essendon with the 4th pick in the 2022 AFL Women's draft, before being traded to St Kilda ahead of the 2025 AFL Women's season.

== Early life ==
Clarke played junior football for the Dandenong Stingrays in the NAB League Girls where she starred, winning both the Stingrays' and the league's best and fairest awards after a season which she averaged 1.8 goals and 17.4 disposals a game. She also won the award for best on ground in the team's loss in the grand final, after collecting 28 disposals and two goals. She won the league best and fairest by a solitary vote ahead of future Hawthorn draftee and St Kilda teammate Charlotte Baskaran, polling 20 votes in total.

== AFL Women's career ==
Clarke debuted for the Essendon in the opening round of the AFL Women's season seven, playing in their inaugural team which faced Hawthorn at Marvel Stadium. On debut, Clarke collected 7 disposals and 3 marks.

=== Statistics ===
Updated to the end of 2024.

Legend
G	Goals	K	Kicks	D	Disposals	T	Tackles
B	Behinds	H	Handballs	M	Marks

Season	Team	No.	Games	Totals							Averages (per game)							Votes
Season	Team	No.	Games	G	B	K	H	D	M	T	G	B	K	H	D	M	T	Votes
S7 (2022)	Essendon	33	10	2	2	78	17	95	23	15	0.2	0.2	7.8	1.7	9.5	2.3	1.5	0
2023	Essendon	33	10	6	5	66	17	83	19	17	0.6	0.5	6.6	1.7	8.3	1.9	1.7	0
2024	Essendon	33	9	6	3	38	14	52	16	8	0.7	0.3	4.2	1.6	5.8	1.8	0.9	0
2025	St Kilda	25																
Career			29	14	10	182	48	230	58	40	0.5	0.3	6.3	1.7	7.9	2.0	1.4	0
