= Taylah Levy =

Personal information
- Born: 31 March 2001 (age 25); Victor Harbor, South Australia
- Original team: South Adelaide (SANFL)
- Draft: No. 7, 2022 draft
- Debut: Round 8, 2023, Adelaide vs. Brisbane, at Springfield Central Stadium
- Height: 165 cm (5 ft 5 in)
- Position: Forward/midfielder

Club information
- Current club: Greater Western Sydney

Playing career^{1}
Years	Club	Games (Goals)
2023–2024	Adelaide	16 (5)
2025–	Greater Western Sydney	0 (0)
Total		16 (5)
- ^{1} Playing statistics correct to the end of 2024.

Taylah Levy (born 31 March 2001) is a professional Australian rules football player who currently plays for the Greater Western Sydney Giants in the AFL Women's (AFLW). Initially signed as a rookie ahead of the 2023 season, Levy played for Adelaide until 2024.

== Early life ==
Levy played basketball, football and netball in her youth. Playing as a midfielder in junior football, she won an under-16 premiership with South Adelaide, competing in her age bracket in the South Australian National Football League. She was offered a scholarship to play basketball for the CSU Vikings in Cleveland, Ohio in 2019. Levy returned to Australia and continued playing football for South Adelaide, as well as basketball for the Eastern Mavericks and the Central District Lions in the NBL1 Central.

== AFL Women's career ==
Levy was signed by the Adelaide Crows prior to the 2023 season as a rookie. She didn't make her debut until round 8 of that year, when she collected 12 disposals in only 46% game time in a 3-point loss to Brisbane. In a 2024 match against Collingwood, Levy kicked a career-best three goals, two of which came in the space of four minutes.

At the conclusion of the 2024 season, Levy was traded to Greater Western Sydney in a trade involving four clubs.
