= Jasmine Grierson =

Australian rules footballer (born 1998)

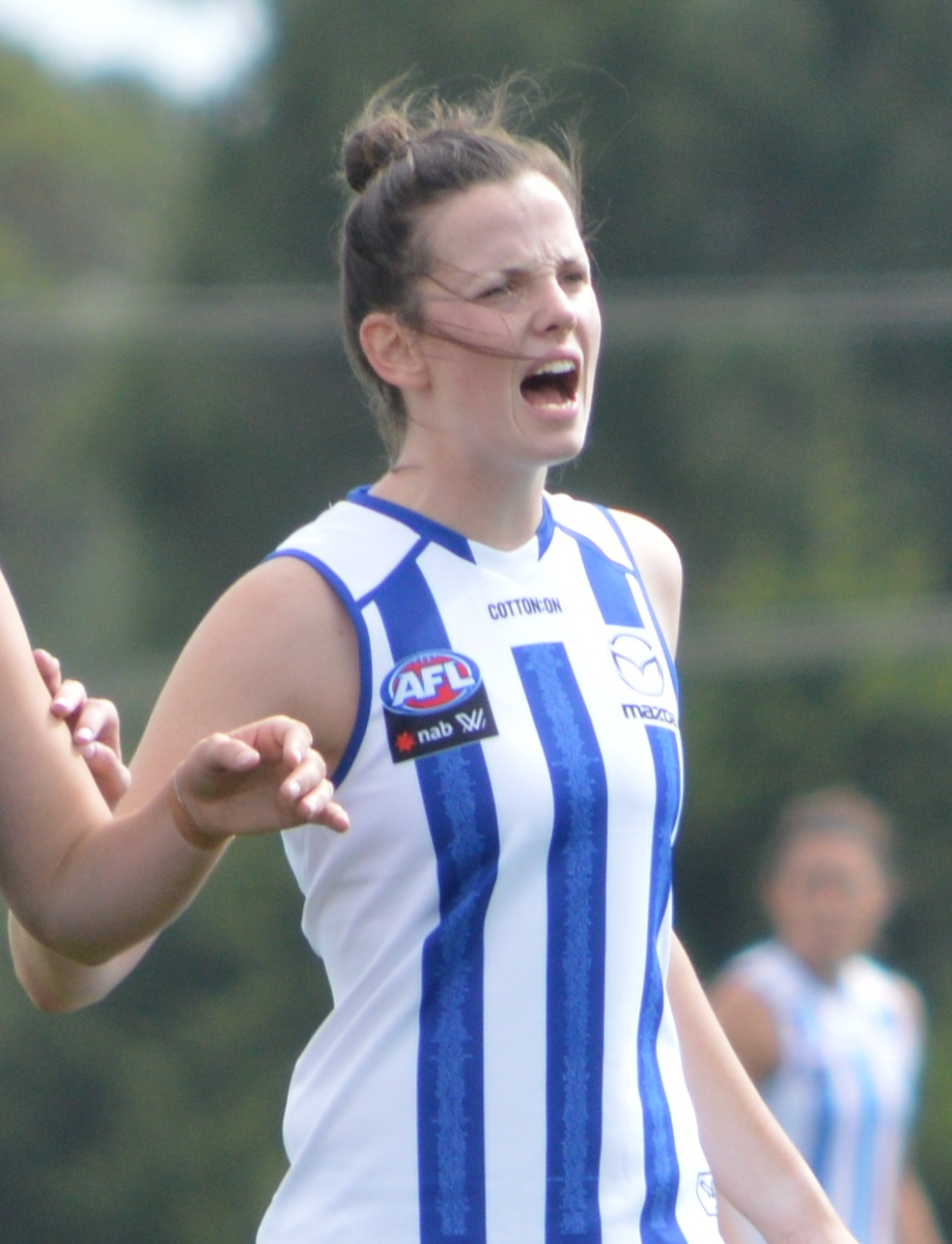
- Grierson with North Melbourne in January 2019

Personal information
- Born: 16 May 1998 (age 28)
- Original team: Cranbourne (VWFL)
- Draft: No. 135, 2016 AFL Women's draft
- Debut: Round 1, 2017, Melbourne vs. Brisbane, at Casey Fields
- Height: 174 cm (5 ft 9 in)
- Position: Forward

Club information
- Current club: Greater Western Sydney
- Number: 10

Playing career^{1}
Years	Club	Games (Goals)
2017–2018	Melbourne	13 (1)
2019–2021	North Melbourne	19 (0)
2022–	Greater Western Sydney	18 (0)
Total		50 (1)
- ^{1} Playing statistics correct to the end of the 2023 season.

Jasmine Grierson (born 16 May 1998) is an Australian rules footballer playing for the Sydney Swans in the AFL Women's (AFLW) competition. She has previously played for Melbourne, North Melbourne and Greater Western Sydney.

== AFLW career ==
Grierson was drafted by Melbourne with their eighteenth selection and 135th overall in the 2016 AFL Women's draft. She made her debut in the fifteen point loss to Brisbane at Casey Fields in the opening round of the 2017 season. After the six point win against Carlton at Casey Fields in round four—in which she recorded sixteen disposals, five marks and two tackles—she was the round nominee for the AFLW Rising Star. She played every match in her debut season to finish with seven games.

Melbourne signed Grierson for the 2018 season during the trade period in May 2017.

In May 2018, Grierson was traded to North Melbourne.

In June 2021, Grierson was traded to Greater Western Sydney in exchange for pick #28.

In December 2024, Grierson signed with the Sydney Swans.

== Personal life ==
Grierson is currently studying a Bachelor of Psychological Science at Deakin University.
