= Vivien Saad =

Australian rules footballer

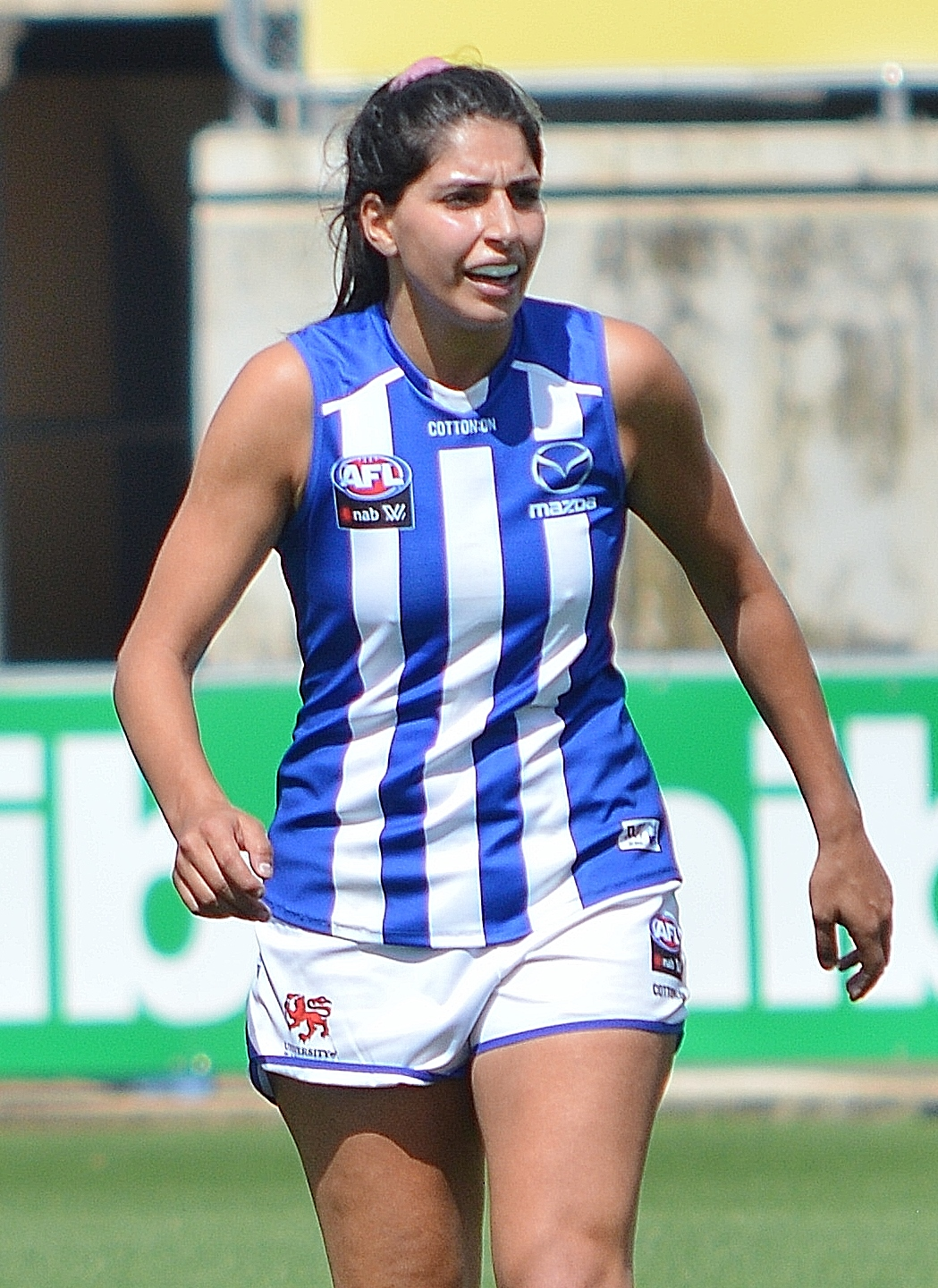
- Saad with North Melbourne in February 2020

Personal information
- Born: 23 June 1992 (age 34)
- Debut: Round 1, 2020, North Melbourne vs. Melbourne, at Casey Fields
- Height: 180 cm (5 ft 11 in)

Playing career^{1}
Years	Club	Games (Goals)
2020–2021	North Melbourne	16 (0)
2022 (S6)–2024	Gold Coast	27 (0)
2025	Greater Western Sydney	1 (0)
Total		44 (0)
- ^{1} Playing statistics correct to the end of the 2025 season.

Vivien Saad (born 23 June 1992) is a former Australian rules footballer who played for North Melbourne, Gold Coast and Greater Western Sydney (GWS) in the AFL Women's (AFLW).

== AFLW career ==
Saad was recruited by North Melbourne in January 2020 as a replacement for Jess Duffin who missed the 2020 season through pregnancy. She made her debut against Melbourne at Casey Fields in the opening round of the 2020 season.

Saad was traded to Gold Coast alongside pick 30 in exchange for pick 19 in the late stages of the 2021 trade period, on 9 June 2021. She missed much of the 2024 season with a ruptured Achilles tendon.

She was delisted at the end of 2024 after 27 games for Gold Coast and signed as a free agent for Greater Western Sydney. She played one game for GWS and was delisted after a single season at the club.

After leaving the Giants, she signed for the Craigieburn Eagles in the Big V Division One basketball competition.

== Statistics ==
Legend
G	Goals	K	Kicks	D	Disposals	T	Tackles
B	Behinds	H	Handballs	M	Marks	H/O	Hit-outs

Season	Team	No.	Games	Totals								Averages (per game)								Votes
Season	Team	No.	Games	G	B	K	H	D	M	T	H/O	G	B	K	H	D	M	T	H/O	Votes
2020	North Melbourne	39	7	0	0	30	37	67	14	17	52	0.0	0.0	4.3	5.3	9.6	2.0	2.4	7.4	2
2021	North Melbourne	39	9	0	0	39	39	78	21	27	61	0.0	0.0	4.3	4.3	8.7	2.3	3.0	6.8	0
2022 (S6)	Gold Coast	39	9	0	0	48	36	84	23	26	0	0.0	0.0	5.3	4.0	9.3	2.6	2.9	0.0	0
2022 (S7)	Gold Coast	39	10	0	0	55	45	100	29	10	0	0.0	0.0	5.5	4.5	10.0	2.9	1.0	0.0	0
2023	Gold Coast	39	8	0	0	57	42	99	28	19	0	0.0	0.0	7.1	5.3	12.4	3.5	2.4	0.0	0
2024	Gold Coast	39	0	—	—	—	—	—	—	—	—	—	—	—	—	—	—	—	—	0
2025	Greater Western Sydney	39	1	0	1	1	2	3	0	4	0	0.0	1.0	1.0	2.0	3.0	0.0	4.0	0.0	0
Career			44	0	1	230	201	431	115	103	113	0.0	0.0	5.2	4.6	9.8	2.6	2.3	2.6	2
