= Bella Smith =

Australian rules footballer (born 2001)

Personal information
- Full name: Bella R. Smith
- Born: 20 September 2001 (age 25); Port Lincoln, South Australia
- Original team: Norwood (SANFLW)
- Draft: undrafted free agency
- Debut: Round 1, 2021, Collingwood vs. Carlton, at Ikon Park
- Height: 182 cm (6 ft 0 in)
- Position: Defender / Forward

Club information
- Current club: Fremantle

Playing career^{1}
Years	Club	Games (Goals)
2021–2022 (S6)	Collingwood	10 (0)
2022 (S7)–2024	Sydney	26 (11)
2025–	Fremantle	15 (7)
Total		51 (18)
- ^{1} Playing statistics correct to the end of the 2026 season.

Bella R. Smith (born 20 September 2001) is a professional Australian rules footballer who plays for Fremantle in the AFL Women's (AFLW), having previously played for the Sydney Swans and Collingwood. She played for Norwood in the SANFL Women's League (SANFLW) before she was signed to an AFLW contract by Collingwood as an undrafted free agent.

== Early life and state football ==
Smith was born in the town Port Lincoln in the Eyre Peninsula. She played junior football for Ports Netball Football Club. In 2016, she represented South Australia at the Australian Football Under 15 Championship in Maroochydore, wearing the number 20 guernsey, like her father. After this she started playing for Norwood's under-16 side. All together Smith played three seasons for Norwood in the SANFL Women's League (SANFLW). After playing 10 matches in 2019, she decided to focus on playing football.

During her time playing state football, she also represented South Australia, playing for the Central Allies at the 2018 AFL Women's Under 18 Championships, though she was injured in the last match against Vic Metro. The following year, she once again played for the Central Allies at the 2019 AFL Women's Under 18 Championships. She scored a goal in their victory over the Eastern Allies and was one of the best players in their loss to Western Australia.

In September 2020, Smith played for Team Marinoff in the SANFLW All-Stars match, putting in a strong showing in defence, denying certain goals and marking strongly.

As well as football, Smith has played softball and cricket. She played at Port Neill Cricket Club and Kensington Cricket Club. From 2017, she also represented South Australia in their under-18 cricket side. She played junior cricket for three years at national level.

== AFLW career ==
Smith joined Collingwood as an undrafted free agent, following the 2020 AFL Women's draft, re-joining coach Stephen Symonds who had coached her at Norwood. Smith played in her first official hit-out in the first practice match of the season, playing against North Melbourne at Ikon Park. Less than two weeks later, she made her debut in the first match of the 2021 AFL Women's season against Carlton at Ikon Park, playing as a forward after playing the pre-season practice match in the ruck and the forward line. In May 2022, Smith left Collingwood to join Sydney, one of the expansion clubs of the 2023 AFL Women's season. Smith was traded to Fremantle in December 2024.

== Style of play ==
Smith is originally a rebounding defender, but also has the ability to play up forward as Collingwood used her in the beginning of the 2021 AFL Women's season. She has strong hands and a penetrating left foot.

== Personal life ==
Smith's uncle, Darren Smith, played 302 games for Port Adelaide in the South Australian National Football League (SANFL), winning seven premierships with them and also played two seasons in the Australian Football League (AFL) with Adelaide in their first two years in the competition. She previously lived in Melbourne with her former teammate Ebony O'Dea. She has also worked as a teacher's aide at SEDA College.

== Statistics ==
Statistics are correct to the end of the 2022 (S6) season.

Legend
G	Goals	K	Kicks	D	Disposals	T	Tackles
B	Behinds	H	Handballs	M	Marks

Season	Team	No.	Games	Totals							Averages (per game)						
Season	Team	No.	Games	G	B	K	H	D	M	T	G	B	K	H	D	M	T
2021	Collingwood	19	6	0	0	12	16	28	6	9	0.0	0.0	2.0	2.7	4.7	1.0	1.5
2022 (S6)	Collingwood	19	4	0	0	9	7	16	4	7	0.0	0.0	2.3	1.8	4.0	1.0	1.8
Career			10	0	0	21	23	44	10	16	0.0	0.0	2.1	2.3	4.4	1.0	1.6
