= Eleanor Brown (footballer) =

Australian rules footballer (born 2000)

Personal information
- Born: 20 January 2000 (age 26)
- Original teams: Sandringham (TAC Cup Girls); Southern Saints (VFLW)
- Draft: No. 10, 2018 AFLW draft
- Debut: Round 1, 2019, Western Bulldogs vs. Adelaide, at Norwood Oval
- Height: 176 cm (5 ft 9 in)
- Position: Utility

Club information
- Current club: Western Bulldogs
- Number: 9

Playing career^{1}
Years	Club	Games (Goals)
2019–	Western Bulldogs	39 (1)
- ^{1} Playing statistics correct to the end of the 2023 season.

Eleanor Brown (born 20 January 2000) is an Australian rules footballer playing for the Western Bulldogs in the AFL Women's (AFLW). She played many positions in her junior career in the TAC Cup Girls and VFL Women's before she was drafted by the Bulldogs with the tenth selection in the 2018 AFLW draft. Brown debuted in the opening round of the 2019 season.

== Junior career ==
Brown began her football locally in 2013 with Glen Iris in the Yarra Junior Football League. Throughout her junior career she also competed in netball and cross country running, which developed her endurance. Brown played for the Sandringham Dragons in the TAC Cup Girls, polling eight votes in the league's 2018 best and fairest to finish equal sixth in the award. She represented Vic Metro at the 2018 AFLW Under 18 Championships and was named in the All-Australian side on the interchange. Brown played six matches in the VFL Women's for the Southern Saints, averaging the second-most disposals (20) and uncontested possessions (10) per match at the club. She tested at the 2018 AFLW draft combine, recording the second-fastest 2-kilometre (1.2 mi) time trial at seven minutes and 29 seconds, behind eventual number-one selection Nina Morrison. Brown also was a part of the 2018 premiership team for Brighton Beach Junior Football club where she played alongside her cousin, Emmie Frederico. Brown played a variety of positions in her junior career. She played in the midfield at her local club, but switched to the wing at Sandringham. She played both positions at the Southern Saints, but swapped to half-back after her performance in the position at the AFLW Under 18 Championships. Speaking at the draft combine, Brown said "I probably prefer the midfield because you can run around more, but I do like half back."

== AFLW career ==
Brown was drafted by the Western Bulldogs with the tenth pick in the 2018 AFLW draft, their first selection. She debuted in the opening round of the 2019 season: a victory over Adelaide at Norwood Oval. After a breakout 2021 season where she averaged higher amounts of handballs, kicks, disposals, marks and tackles, she claimed the team's Most Improved Player Award for 2021. It was revealed that Brown had signed a contract extension with the club on 16 June 2021, after playing every game possible for the club that season.

== Statistics ==
Statistics are correct to the end of the 2021 season.

Legend
G	Goals	K	Kicks	D	Disposals	T	Tackles
B	Behinds	H	Handballs	M	Marks

Season	Team	No.	Games	Totals							Averages (per game)							Votes
Season	Team	No.	Games	G	B	K	H	D	M	T	G	B	K	H	D	M	T	Votes
2019	Western Bulldogs	9	5	0	0	21	13	34	7	7	0.0	0.0	4.2	2.6	6.8	1.4	1.4	0
2020	Western Bulldogs	9	5	0	0	19	14	33	7	13	0.0	0.0	3.8	2.8	6.6	1.4	2.6	0
2021	Western Bulldogs	9	9	0	0	71	28	99	28	41	0.0	0.0	7.9	3.1	11.0	3.1	4.6	0
Career			19	0	0	111	55	166	42	61	0.0	0.0	5.8	2.9	8.7	2.2	3.2	0

== Honours and achievements ==
Individual

- AFL Women's Rising Star nominee: 2021
