= Airlie Runnalls =

Australian rules footballer

Airlie Morgan Runnalls

Personal information
- Born: 25 June 1998 (age 28); Airlie Beach
- Original team: North Melbourne (VFLW)
- Draft: No. 44, 2021 AFL Women's draft
- Debut: Round 1, 2022 (S6), Fremantle vs. West Coast, at Fremantle Oval
- Height: 164 cm (5 ft 5 in)
- Position: Midfielder

Club information
- Current club: Collingwood
- Number: 36

Playing career^{1}
Years	Club	Games (Goals)
2022 (S6)–2024	Fremantle	44 (5)
2025–	Collingwood	24 (4)
Total		68 (9)
- ^{1} Playing statistics correct to the end of the 2026 season.

Airlie Runnalls (born 25 June 1998) is an Australian rules footballer playing for Collingwood in the AFL Women's (AFLW). She has previously played for Fremantle.

== AFLW career ==
Runnalls was drafted by Fremantle with their fourth selection, and 44th overall in the 2021 AFL Women's draft.

Originally from Yarrawonga on the Victoria-NSW border, Runnalls was recruited from North Melbourne as Fremantle's first ever draft selection from outside of Western Australia. She made her debut in the opening round of 2022 season 6.

In December 2024, she was traded to Collingwood.

== Statistics ==
Updated to the end of the 2025 season.

Legend
G	Goals	K	Kicks	D	Disposals	T	Tackles
B	Behinds	H	Handballs	M	Marks

Season	Team	No.	Games	Totals							Averages (per game)							Votes
Season	Team	No.	Games	G	B	K	H	D	M	T	G	B	K	H	D	M	T	Votes
2022 (S6)	Fremantle	22	12	2	4	97	57	154	32	24	0.2	0.3	8.1	4.8	12.8	2.7	2.0	1
2022 (S7)	Fremantle	22	10	0	1	91	49	140	23	25	0.0	0.1	9.1	4.9	14.0	2.3	2.5	0
2023	Fremantle	22	10	1	4	74	58	132	26	30	0.1	0.4	7.4	5.8	13.2	2.6	3.0	0
2024	Fremantle	22	13	2	0	81	68	149	30	45	0.2	0.0	6.2	5.2	11.5	2.3	3.5	0
2025	Collingwood	36	12	2	6	98	91	189	32	48	0.2	0.5	8.2	7.6	15.8	2.7	4.0	0
Career			57	7	15	441	323	764	143	172	0.1	0.3	7.7	5.7	13.4	2.5	3.0	1
