= Ashleigh Van Loon =

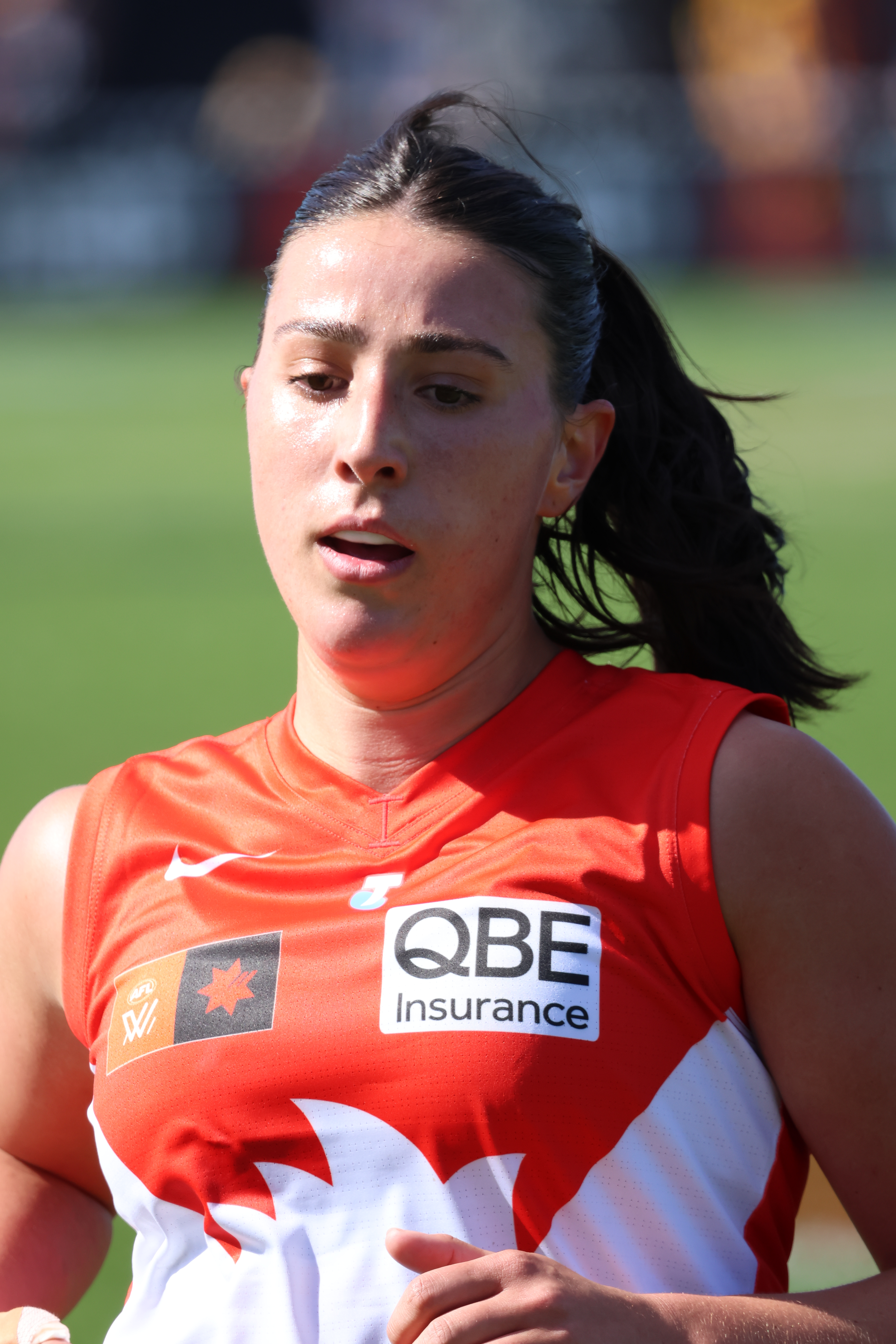
- Van Loon in August 2026

Personal information
- Full name: Ashleigh Van Loon
- Born: 8 December 2004 (age 21)
- Original teams: Geelong (VFLW); St Mary's (GFNL)
- Draft: No. 73, 2022 draft
- Debut: Round 1, 2022 ^{(S7)}, Sydney vs. Hawthorn, at Docklands Stadium
- Height: 169 cm (5 ft 7 in)
- Position: Defender

Club information
- Current club: Sydney
- Number: 17

Playing career^{1}
Years	Club	Games (Goals)
2022 (S7)–2024	Essendon	26 (0)
2025–	Sydney	10 (0)
Total		36 (0)
- ^{1} Playing statistics correct to the end of 2025.

Ashleigh Van Loon (born 8 December 2004) is a professional Australian rules footballer. Since 2025, she has been playing for the Sydney Swans in the AFL Women's (AFLW).

She was initially drafted from Geelong in the VFL Women's to Essendon with pick 73 in the 2022 AFL Women's draft.

== AFL Women's career ==
Van Loon was drafted to Essendon in 2022 while completing her senior year of secondary education. As it was the Bombers' first season in the competition, Van Loon became a part of their inaugural squad. After she made her debut in round one against Hawthorn at Docklands Stadium in season 7, she made history as one of the 21 players in Essendon's inaugural women's team.

Following the conclusion of the 2024 season, Van Loon was traded to the Sydney Swans where she would reunite with junior teammate Darcy Moloney.
