= Essendon Football Club =

Australian rules football club

Names
- Full name: Essendon Football Club
- Nicknames: Bombers; Dons; Same Olds; Sash Wearers
- Motto: Suaviter in Modo, Fortiter in Re "Gently in manner, resolutely in execution"

2026 season
- After finals: DNQ
- Home-and-away season: 18th
- Leading goalkicker: Nate Caddy (46 goals)
- Crichton Medal: Zach Merrett

Club details
- Founded: 1872; 154 years ago
- Colours: Red Black
- Competition: AFL: Senior men AFLW: Senior women VFL: Reserves men VFLW: Reserves women VWFL: Wheelchair
- President: Andrew Welsh
- CEO: Tim Roberts
- Coach: AFL: Mark McVeigh; AFLW: Natalie Wood; VFL: Cameron Joyce; VFLW: Vacant
- Captain(s): AFL: Andrew McGrath; AFLW: Bonnie Toogood; VFL: Xavier O'Neill; VFLW: El Chaston; VWFL: Louis Rowe
- Premierships: VFL/AFL (16): 1897, 1901, 1911, 1912, 1923, 1924, 1942, 1946, 1949, 1950, 1962, 1965, 1984, 1985, 1993, 2000; VFA (4): 1891, 1892, 1893, 1894; Reserves/VFL (7): 1941, 1950, 1952, 1968, 1983, 1992, 1999; VFLW (1): 2022; Championship of Australia (1): 1893
- Ground: AFL: Marvel Stadium (56,347) & Melbourne Cricket Ground (100,024); AFLW: Windy Hill (10,000); VFL/VFLW: Windy Hill (10,000), The Hangar (3,500); VWFL: Boroondara Sports Complex
- Former ground: Windy Hill (1922–1991)
- Training ground: The Hangar (2013–present)

Uniforms
Home	Away	Clash

Other information
- Official website: essendonfc.com.au

The Essendon Football Club, nicknamed the Bombers or colloquially the Dons, is a professional Australian rules football club that plays in the Australian Football League (AFL), the game's premier competition. Formed by the McCracken family in their Ascot Vale home in 1872, the club played its first recorded game in 1873. From 1878 until 1896, the club played in the Victorian Football Association (VFA), where it won four consecutive premierships between 1891 and 1894. In 1896, Essendon joined seven other clubs to form the breakaway Victorian Football League (known as the AFL since 1990), winning the inaugural VFL premiership in 1897. Headquartered at Windy Hill from 1922 to 2013, the club moved to The Hangar in late 2013. The club currently shares its home games between Docklands Stadium and the Melbourne Cricket Ground. Andrew McGrath serves as the club captain as of 2026.

Essendon is one of Australia's most successful and prominent football clubs, having won 16 VFL/AFL premierships, which is tied (along with Carlton and Collingwood) for the most of any club in the competition. The club experienced notable golden eras under captain-coach Dick Reynolds in the 1940s and 1950s, and under coach Kevin Sheedy from the 1980s to the early 2000s, cultivating the iconic "Baby Bombers" team in 1993 and recording a historically dominant season in 2000.

However, the club has struggled to achieve significant on-field success in the 21st century, having not won a finals match since 2004. In 2013, the club was implicated in the longest-running anti-doping investigation in Australian sports history, which resulted in the club being fined, disqualified from the 2013 finals series, and stripped of draft picks, while 34 past and present players were ultimately suspended for the 2016 season.

The team plays in two of the AFL's longest-running annual marquee fixtures: the Anzac Day clash with Collingwood (since 1995) and Dreamtime at the 'G with Richmond (since 2005). Three Essendon players—John Coleman, Bill Hutchison, and Reynolds—and coach Sheedy are elevated as "Legends" in the Australian Football Hall of Fame.

In addition to its senior men's side, Essendon fields reserve men's and women's teams in the Victoria Football League and VFL Women's. Since 2022, the club has fielded a senior women's team in the national AFL Women's (AFLW) competition.

== History ==
=== Formation and VFA years (1872–1896) ===
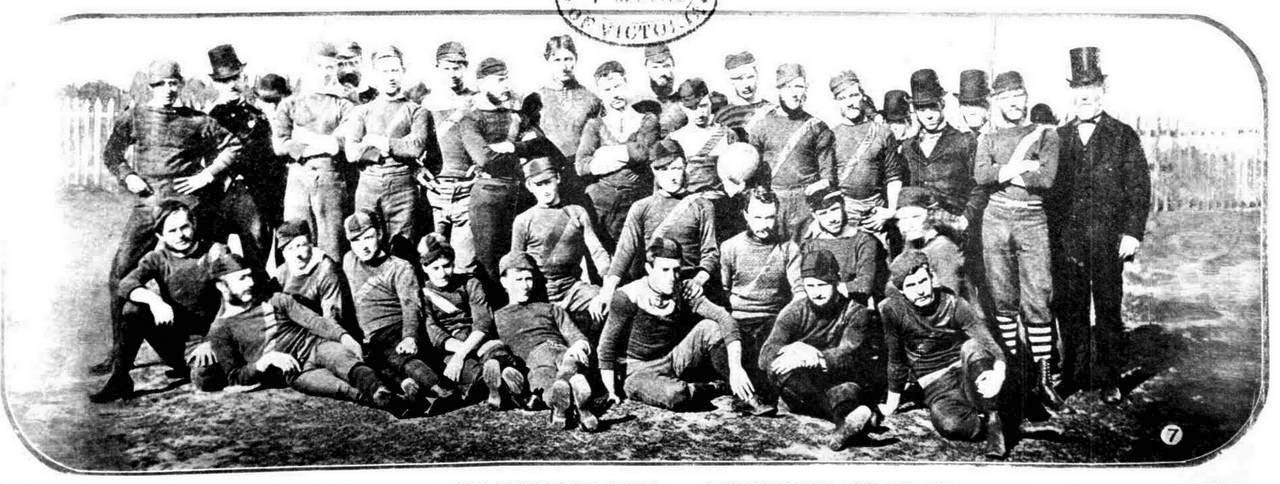
Essendon players and officials in 1872

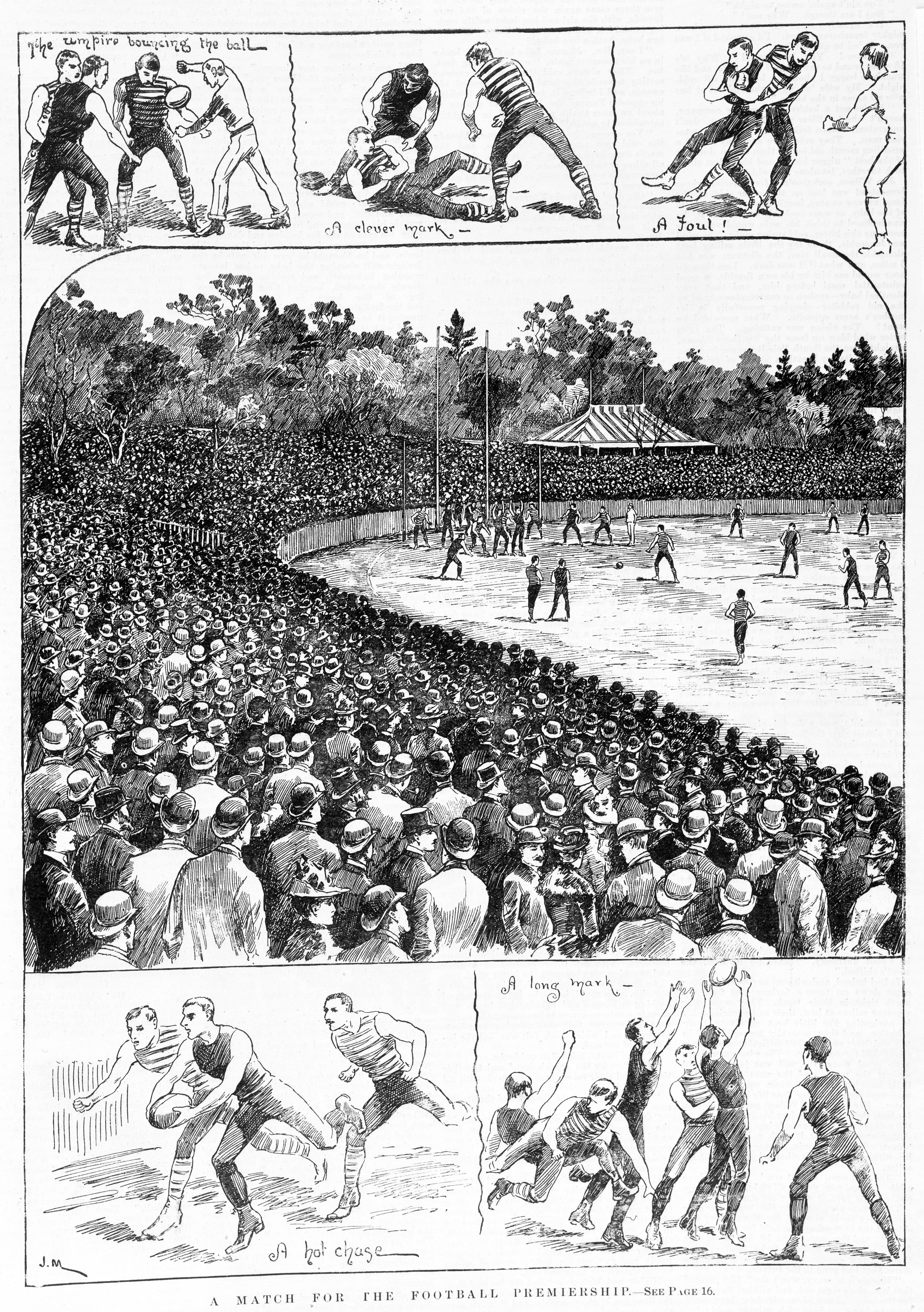
Scenes from the 1891 VFA Premiership Match in which Essendon defeated Carlton

The club was founded by members of the Royal Agricultural Society, the Melbourne Hunt Club and the Victorian Woolbrokers. The Essendon Football Club is thought to have been formed in 1872 at a meeting in the home of a well-known brewery family, the McCrackens, whose Ascot Vale property hosted a team of local junior players.

Robert McCracken (1813–1885), the owner of several city hotels, was the founder and first president of the Essendon Football Club, and his son, Alex McCracken, its first secretary. Alex later became president of the newly formed VFL. Alex's cousin Collier McCracken, who had already played with Melbourne, was the team's first captain.

The club played its first recorded match against the Carlton Second Twenty (the reserves) on 7 June 1873, with Essendon winning by one goal. Essendon played 13 matches in its first season, winning seven, with four draws and losing two. The club was one of the inaugural junior members of the Victorian Football Association (VFA) in 1877, and it began competing as a senior club from the 1878 season. During its early years in the Association, Essendon played its home matches at Flemington Hill, but it moved to the East Melbourne Cricket Ground in 1881.

In 1878, at Flemington Hill, Essendon played its first match on what would be considered by modern standards to be a full-sized field. In 1879, Essendon played Melbourne in one of the earliest night matches recorded when the ball was painted white. In 1883, the team played four matches in eight days in Adelaide: losing to Norwood (on 23 June) and defeating Port Adelaide (on 16 June), a combined South Australian team (on 18 June), and South Adelaide (on 20 June).

The club played against the touring British footballers in 1888.

In 1891, Essendon won their first VFA premiership, which they repeated in 1892, 1893 and 1894. One of the club's greatest players, Albert Thurgood, played for the club during this period, making his debut in 1892. Essendon (18 wins, 2 draws) was undefeated in the 1893 season.

=== Founding of the VFL to World War I (1897–1915) ===
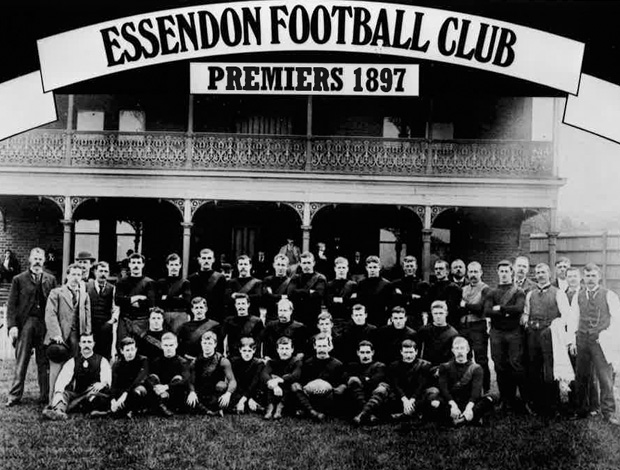
The Essendon side that won the 1897 VFL premiership

Chart of yearly ladder positions for Essendon in VFL/AFL

At the end of the 1896 season, Essendon, along with seven other clubs, formed the Victorian Football League. Essendon's first VFL game was in 1897 against Geelong at Corio Oval in Geelong. Essendon won its first VFL premiership by winning the 1897 VFL finals series in a round-robin event. Essendon again won the premiership in 1901, defeating Collingwood in the Grand Final. The club won successive premierships in 1911 and 1912 over Collingwood and South Melbourne, respectively.

=== "Same Olds" ===
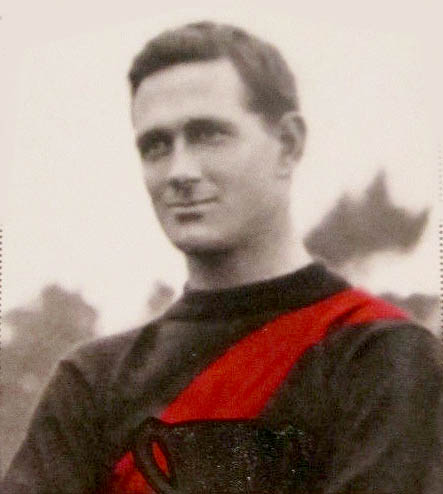
Dave Smith captained Essendon to premiership success in 1911.

The club is recorded as having played at McCracken's Paddock, Glass's Paddock, and Flemington Hill. It is likely that these are three different names for the one ground, given that McCracken's Paddock was a parcel of land that sat within the larger Glass's Paddock, which in turn was situated in an area widely known at the time as Flemington Hill. In 1882, the club moved home games to the East Melbourne Cricket Ground (since demolished) after an application to play on the Essendon Cricket Ground (later known as Windy Hill) was voted down by Lord Mayor of the City of Essendon, James Taylor, on the basis that the considered the Essendon Cricket Ground "to be suitable only for the gentleman's game of cricket".

The club became known by the nickname "the Same Old Essendon" from the title and hook of the principal song performed by a band of supporters which regularly occupied a section of the grandstand at the club's games. The nickname first appeared in print in the local North Melbourne Advertiser in 1889, and ended up gaining wide use, often as the diminutive "Same Olds".

This move away from Essendon, at a time when fans would walk to their local ground, didn't go down too well with many Essendon people; and, as a consequence, a new team and club was formed in 1900, unconnected with the first (although it played in the same colours), that was based at the Essendon Cricket Ground, and playing in the Victorian Football Association. It was known firstly as Essendon Town and, after 1905, as Essendon (although it was often called Essendon A, with the A standing for association).

=== Return to suburban Essendon (1921–1932) ===
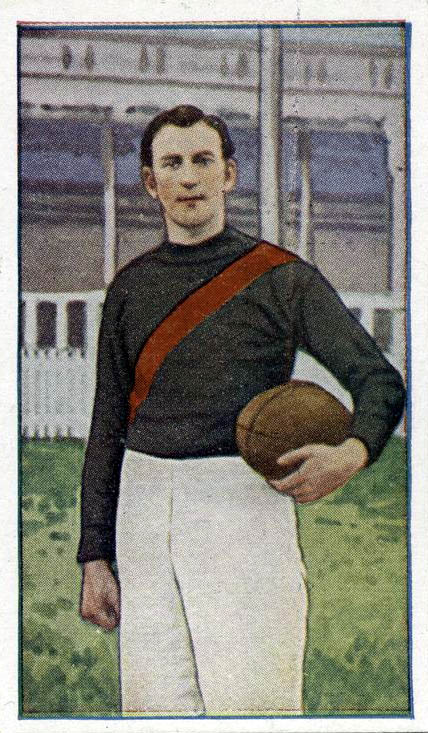
Fred Baring during the 1920s

After the 1921 season, the East Melbourne Cricket Ground was closed and demolished to expand the Flinders Street Railyard. Having played at the East Melbourne Cricket Ground from 1882 to 1921, and having won four VFA premierships (1891–1894) and four VFL premierships (1897, 1901, 1911 and 1912) while there, Essendon was looking for a new home. It was offered grounds at the current Royal Melbourne Showgrounds, Ascot Vale; at Victoria Park, Melbourne; at Arden St, North Melbourne; and the Essendon Cricket Ground. The Essendon City Council offered the (VFL) team the Essendon Cricket Ground, announcing that it would be prepared to spend over £12,000 (equivalent to A$2,159,104 in 2022) on improvements, including a new grandstand, scoreboard and re-fencing of the oval.

The club's first preference was to move to North Melbourne—a move which the North Melbourne Football Club (then in the VFA) saw as an opportunity to get into the VFL. Most of Essendon's members and players were from the North Melbourne area, and sportswriters believed that Essendon would have been taken over by or rebranded as North Melbourne within only a few years of the move. However, the VFA, desperate for its own strategic reasons not to lose its use of the North Melbourne Cricket Ground, successfully appealed to the State Government to block Essendon's move to North Melbourne. With its preferred option off the table, the club returned to Essendon, and the Essendon VFA club disbanded, with most of its players moving to North Melbourne.

The old "Same Olds" nickname fell into disuse, and by 1922 the other nicknames "Sash Wearers" and "Essendonians" that had been variously used from time to time were also abandoned. The team became universally known as "the Dons" (from EssenDON). (The club adopted the nickname "the Bombers" at the start of 1940 during the early phases of World War II, due to Windy Hill's proximity to what was then Melbourne’s main airport, Essendon Aerodrome.)

In the 1922 season, playing in Essendon for the first time in decades, Essendon reached the final four for the first time since 1912, finishing in third place. In the 1923 season, the club topped the ladder with 13 wins from 16 games. After a 17-point Second Semi-Final loss to South Melbourne, Essendon defeated Fitzroy (who had beaten South Melbourne) in the 1923 Grand Final (then known as a "Challenge Final" due to its different finals format): Essendon 8.15 (63) to Fitzroy 6.10 (46). Amongst Essendon's best players were half-forward flanker George "Tich" Shorten, centre half-forward Justin McCarthy, centre half-back Tom Fitzmaurice, rover Frank Maher, and wingman Jack Garden. This was one of Essendon's most famous sides, dubbed the "Mosquito Fleet" due to the number of small, very fast players in the side. Six players were 5'6" (167 cm) or shorter.

In the 1924 season, for the first time since their inaugural premiership in 1897, there was no ultimate match to decide the league's champion team – either "Challenge Final" or "Grand Final" – to determine the premiers; instead, the top four clubs after the home-and-away season played a round-robin to determine the premiers. Essendon, having previously defeated both Fitzroy (by 40 points) and South Melbourne (by 33 points), clinched the premiership by means of a 20-point loss to Richmond. With the Tigers having already lost a match to Fitzroy by a substantial margin, the Dons were declared premiers by virtue of their superior percentage, meaning that Essendon again managed to win successive premierships. But the low gates for the finals meant this was never attempted again, resulting in Essendon, with its success in the 1897 finals series, having the unique record of winning the only two premierships without a grand final.

Prominent contributors to Essendon's 1924 Premiership success included back pocket Clyde Donaldson, follower Norm Beckton, half-back flanker Roy Laing, follower Charlie May, and rover Charlie Hardy. The 1924 season was not without controversy, however, with rumours of numerous players accepting bribes. Regardless of the accuracy of these allegations, the club's image was tarnished, and the side experienced its lowest period during the decade that followed, with poor results on the field and decreased support off it.

There was worse to follow, with various Essendon players publicly blaming each other for a poor performance against Richmond, and then, with dissension still rife in the ranks, the side plummeted to an unexpected and humiliating 28-point loss to VFA premiers Footscray in a special charity match played a week later in front of 46,100 people, in aid of Dame Nellie Melba's Limbless Soldiers' Appeal Fund, purportedly (but not officially) for the championship of Victoria.

The club's fortunes dipped alarmingly—and persistently. Indeed, after finishing third in the 1926 season, it was to be 14 years later—in 1940—before Essendon would even contest another finals series.

=== Dick Reynolds years (1933–1960) ===
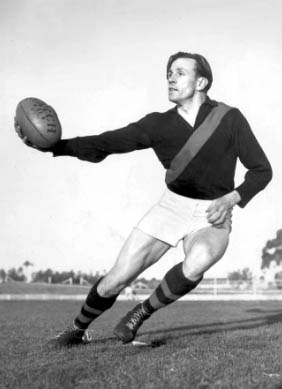
Dick Reynolds is regarded as one of Essendon's greatest players.

After the malaise of the late 1920s and early 1930, the 1933 season proved a turning point in morale despite no finals entries for the entire 1930s. Essendon saw the debut of the player regarded as one of the game's greatest-ever players, Dick Reynolds. His impact was immediate. He won his first Brownlow Medal aged 19. His record of three Brownlow victories (1934, 1937, 1938), equalled Fitzroy's Haydn Bunton, Sr (1931, 1932, 1935), and later equalled by Bob Skilton (1959, 1963, 1968), and Ian Stewart (1965, 1966, 1971).

Reynolds was appointed coach, jointly with Harry Hunter, in 1939 while still a player. A year later, he became the sole coach and led the side into the finals in 1940 for the first time since 1926, finishing third. Melbourne defeated Essendon by 5 points in the preliminary final and went on to win the premiership.

The Essendon Football Club adopted the nickname The Bombers in April 1940.

The 1941 season culminated in Essendon's first grand final appearance since 1923, but the side again lowered its colours to Melbourne. While Australia had entered World War II – located primarily in Europe and Africa – in 1939, the Pacific Theatre opened in December 1941. Australian sports competition was considerably weakened, with Geelong being forced to pull out of the competition due to petrol rationing. Attendances at games also declined dramatically, while some clubs had to move from their normal grounds due to them being used for military purposes. Many players were lost to football due to their military service. Nevertheless, Essendon went on to win the 1942 Premiership with Western Australian Wally Buttsworth in irrepressible form at centre half-back. Essendon won the 1942 Premiership by defeating Richmond in the grand final, 19.18 (132) to 11.13 (79). The match was played at Princes Park in front of 49,000 spectators.

Essendon lost the 1943 grand final to Richmond by 5 points, finished 3rd in 1944, and dropped to 8th in 1945.

After World War II, Essendon enjoyed great success. In the five years immediately after the war, Essendon won three premierships (1946, 1949, 1950) and were runners-up twice (1947, 1948). In 1946, Essendon were clearly the VFL's supreme force, topping the ladder after the home-and-away games and surviving a drawn second semi-final against Collingwood to make it through to the grand final a week later with a score of 10.16 (76) to 8.9 (57). In the grand final against Melbourne, Essendon set a grand final record score of 22.18 (150) to Melbourne 13.9 (87), featuring a 7-goal performance by centre half-forward Gordon Lane. Rover Bill Hutchinson, and defenders Wally Buttsworth, Cec Ruddell and Harold Lambert were among the best players.

Essendon lost the 1947 Grand Final to Carlton by a single point despite recording 30 scoring shots to 21. The following year, Essendon tied with Melbourne in the 1948 grand final, kicking 7.27 to Melbourne's 10.9, before losing the replay 13.11 (89) to 7.8 (50). Following the season, the club's annual report noted the need for a spearhead full-forward, stating: "It is very apparent that no team is complete without a spearhead and your committee has high hopes of rectifying that fault this coming season".

The 1949 season marked the debut of John Coleman. In his first appearance against Hawthorn in Round 1, 1949, he kicked 12 goals, establishing a round one record that stood for forty-five years. Coleman maintained this form throughout the season, kicking exactly 100 goals to become the first player to kick 100 goals in a season since Richmond's Jack Titus in 1940, and the first to do so in a debut season.

Essendon qualified for the finals in 4th place and went on to win the premiership.

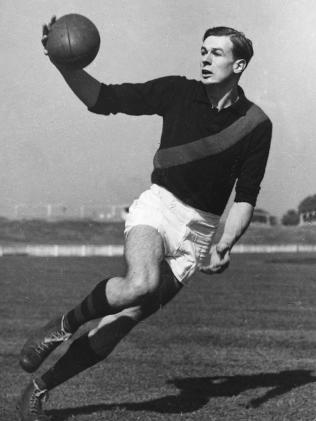
John Coleman kicked 537 goals in 98 matches.

Essendon defeated Collingwood by 82 points in the first semi-final, and North Melbourne by 17 points in the preliminary final. In the grand final against Carlton, Essendon won by 73 points, 18.17 (125) to 6.16 (52). Best players for Essendon included Norm McDonald, Bob McLure, Bill Hutchinson and Ron McEwin. John Coleman kicked six goals.

In 1950, Essendon defeated the North Melbourne Football Club in both the Second Semi-Final and the Grand Final to secure consecutive VFL premierships. Best afield in the 1950 Grand Final, his final match as a player, was captain-coach Dick Reynolds, alongside Norm McDonald, Wally May, Les Gardiner, and Bob McLure.

With Reynolds, aka 'King Richard', still holding court as coach in 1951, albeit now in a non-playing capacity, Essendon seemed on course for a third consecutive flag, but a controversial four-week suspension dished out to John Coleman on the eve of the finals effectively destroyed their chances. Coleman was reported for retaliation after twice being struck by his direct Carlton opponent, Harry Caspar, and without him the Dons were rated a four-goals-poorer team. Nevertheless, they still managed to battle their way to a sixth successive grand final with wins over Footscray by eight points in the first semi-final and Collingwood by two points in the preliminary final.

The Dons sustained numerous injuries in the preliminary final, and the selectors sprang a surprise on Grand Final day by naming the officially retired Dick Reynolds as 20th man. Reynolds was powerless to prevent the inevitable; although leading at half-time, Geelong kicked five goals to Essendon's two points in the third quarter to set up victory by 11 points.

Essendon slumped to 8th in 1952, but Coleman was in strong form, managing 103 goals for the year.

Two seasons later, Coleman's career was ended after he dislocated a knee during the Round 8 clash with the North Melbourne Football Club at Essendon. Aged just 25, he had kicked 537 goals in only 98 VFL games.

Following Coleman's career-ending knee injury, Essendon won no further premierships in the 1950s. In 1957, Essendon defeated Melbourne by 16 points in the Second Semi-Final, but lost the grand final to Melbourne by 61 points.

The 1959 season ended with a 37-point grand final loss to Melbourne. Essendon would win their next premiership three years later in 1962.

=== Post-Reynolds era and the "Slugging Seventies" (1961–1980) ===
John Coleman started his coaching career at Essendon in 1961, thus ending the Dick Reynolds era at the club. In the same year, Essendon finished the season mid-table, and supporters were not expecting too much for the following season. However, the club blitzed the opposition in 1962, losing only two matches and finishing top of the table. Both losses were to the previous year's grand finalists. The finals posed no problems for the resurgent Dons, easily accounting for Carlton in the season's climax, winning the 1962 Premiership by 32 points. This was a remarkable result for Coleman, who, in just his second season of coaching, claimed the ultimate prize in Australian football. As so often is the case after a flag, the following two years were below standard. A further premiership in 1965 (won from 4th position on the ladder) was also unexpected due to periods of poor form during the 1965 season. The Bombers were a different club when the finals came around, but some of the credit for the improvement was given to the influence of Brian Sampson and Ted Fordham during the finals. Coleman's time as coach turned out to be much like his playing career: highly successful but cut short when he had to stand down due to health problems in 1967. Only six years later, on the eve of the 1973 season, he died of a heart attack at just 44 years of age.

Following Coleman's retirement, the club experienced tough times on and off the field. Finals appearances were rare for the side, which was often in contention for the wooden spoon. Essendon did manage to make the 1968 VFL Grand Final, but it lost to Carlton by just three points and did not make it back to the big stage for 15 years.

During the period from 1968 until 1980, five different coaches were tried, with none lasting longer than four years. Off the field, the club went through troubled times as well. In 1970, five players went on strike before the season even began, demanding higher payments. Essendon did make the finals in 1972 and 1973 under the autocratic direction of Des Tuddenham (Collingwood), but they were beaten badly in successive elimination finals by St. Kilda and did not taste finals action again until the very end of the decade. The 1970s Essendon sides were involved in many rough and tough encounters under Tuddenham, who himself came to loggerheads with Ron Barassi at a quarter-time huddle where both coaches exchanged heated words. Essendon had tough but talented players with the likes of Ron "Rotten Ronnie" Andrews and experienced players such as Barry Davis, Ken Fletcher, Geoff Blethyn, Neville Fields and Western Australian import Graham Moss. In May 1974, a controversial half-time all-in-brawl with Richmond at Windy Hill and a 1975 encounter with Carlton were testimony to the era. Following the Carlton match, the Herald described Windy Hill as "Boot Hill" because of the extent of the fights and the high number of reported players (eight in all — four from Carlton and four from Essendon). The peak of these incidents occurred in 1980, with new recruit Phil Carman making headlines for head-butting an umpire. The tribunal suspended him for sixteen weeks, and although most people thought this was a fair (or even lenient) sentence, he took his case to the Supreme Court of Victoria, gathering even more unwanted publicity for the club. Despite this, the club had recruited many talented young players in the late 1970s who emerged as club greats. Three of those young players were Simon Madden, Tim Watson and Paul Van Der Haar. Terry Daniher and his brother Neale came via a trade with South Melbourne, and Roger Merrett joined soon afterwards to form the nucleus of what would become the formidable Essendon sides of the 1980s. This raw but talented group of youngsters took Essendon to an elimination final in 1979 under Barry Davis but were again thrashed in an Elimination Final, this time at the hands of Fitzroy. Davis resigned at the end of the 1980 season after missing out on a finals appearance.

One of the few highlights for Essendon supporters during this time was when Graham Moss won the 1976 Brownlow Medal; he was the only Bomber to do so in a four-decade span from 1953 to 1993. Even that was bittersweet, as he quit VFL football to move back to his native Western Australia, where Moss finished out his career as a player and coach at Claremont Football Club. In many ways, Moss's career reflects Essendon's mixed fortunes during the decade.

=== Kevin Sheedy era (1981–2007) ===
Essendon 1980s shield logo

Former Richmond player Kevin Sheedy started as head coach in 1981.

Essendon reached the Grand Final in 1983, the first time since 1968. Hawthorn won by a then-record 83 points.

In 1984, Essendon won the pre-season competition and completed the regular season on top of the ladder. The club played, and beat, Hawthorn in the 1984 VFL Grand Final to win their 13th premiership — their first since 1965. The teams met again in the 1985 Grand Final, which Essendon also won. At the start of 1986, Essendon were considered unbackable for three successive flags, but a succession of injuries to key players Paul Van der Haar (only fifteen games from 1986 to 1988), Tim Watson, Darren Williams, Roger Merrett and Simon Madden led the club to win only eight of its last eighteen games in 1986 and only nine games (plus a draw with Geelong) in 1987. In July 1987, the Bombers suffered a humiliation at the hands of Sydney, who fell two points short of scoring the then highest score in VFL history.

In 1988, Essendon made a rebound to sixth place with twelve wins, including a 140-point thrashing of Brisbane in which they had a record sixteen individual goalkickers. In 1989, they rebounded further to second on the ladder with only five losses and thrashed Geelong in the Qualifying Final. However, after a fiery encounter with Hawthorn ended in a convincing defeat, the Bombers were eliminated by Geelong the following week.

In 1990, Essendon finished top of the ladder. However, after the Qualifying Final between Collingwood and West Coast was drawn and replayed, Essendon lost to Collingwood in both the second semi-final and the grand final.

Following the 1991 season, Essendon moved its home games from its traditional home ground at Windy Hill to the larger and newly renovated MCG. This move generated large increases in game attendances, memberships and revenue for the club. The club's training and administrative base remained at Windy Hill until 2013.

Following the retirement of Tim Watson and Simon Madden in the early 1990s, the team was built on new players such as Gavin Wanganeen, Joe Misiti, Mark Mercuri, Michael Long, Dustin Fletcher (son of Ken) and James Hird, who was taken at No. 79 in the 1990 draft. This side became known as the "Baby Bombers", as the core of the 1993 premiership side was made up of young players early in their careers.

The team won the 1993 Grand Final against Carlton and that same year, Gavin Wanganeen won the Brownlow Medal, the first awarded to an Essendon player since 1976. Three years later, James Hird was jointly awarded the medal with Michael Voss of Brisbane.

In 2000, the club shifted the majority of its home games to the newly opened Docklands Stadium, signing a 25-year deal to play seven home matches per year at the venue, with the other four remaining at the MCG. The season was one of the most successful by any team in VFL/AFL history, and the club opened with 20 consecutive wins before they lost to the Western Bulldogs in round 21. The team went on to win their 16th premiership, defeating Melbourne, thereby completing the most dominant single season in AFL/VFL history. The defeat to the Bulldogs was the only defeat for Essendon throughout the entire calendar year, as Essendon also won the 2000 pre-season competition. Its players also earned 116 (out of a possible 132) Brownlow Medal votes during the year, a record for any team that still stands as of today.

Essendon was less successful after 2001. Lucrative contracts to a number of premiership players had caused serious pressure on the club's salary cap, forcing the club to trade several key players. Blake Caracella, Chris Heffernan, Justin Blumfield, Gary Moorcroft and Damien Hardwick had all departed by the end of 2002; in 2004, Mark Mercuri, Sean Wellman and Joe Misiti retired. The club remained competitive; however, they could progress no further than the second week of the finals each year for the years of 2002, 2003, and 2004. Sheedy signed a new three-year contract at the end of 2004.

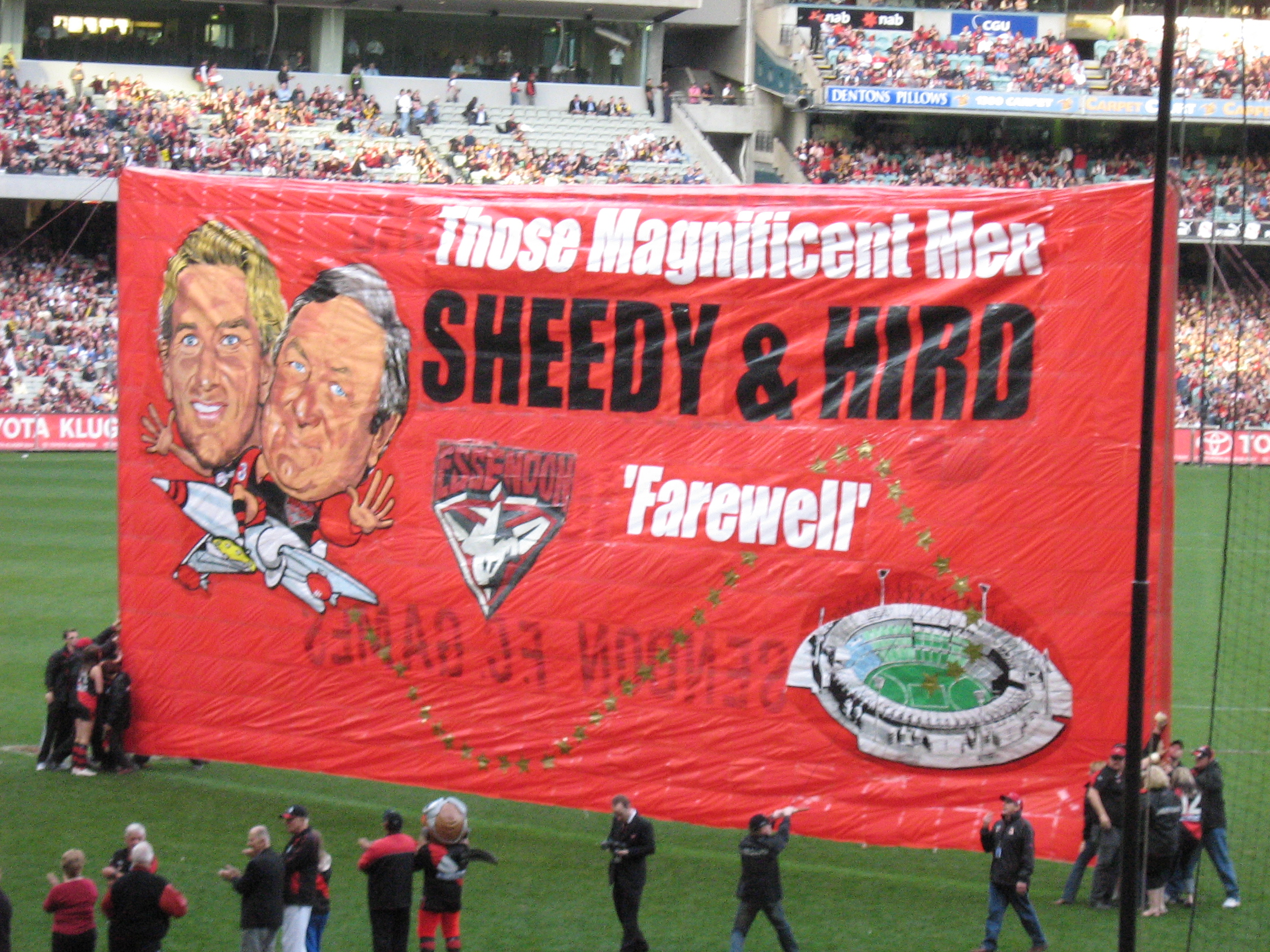
Kevin Sheedy and James Hird farewell banner ahead of their final game at the Melbourne Cricket Ground

In 2005, Essendon missed the finals for the first time since 1997, and in 2006, despite a first-round 27-point thrashing of defending premiers Sydney in which newly appointed captain Matthew Lloyd kicked eight goals playing on Leo Barry, shortly after which he suffered a season-ending hamstring injury, the Bombers were uncompetitive for the majority of the season, recording only three wins and one draw from twenty-two games to suffer its worst season since 1933. In Lloyd's absence, David Hille was appointed captain for the remainder of the season. The club improved its on-field position in 2007 but again missed the finals.

=== Supplements saga and fallout (2013 - 2021) ===
In 2013, Essendon was investigated by the AFL and the Australian Sports Anti-Doping Authority (ASADA) over its 2012 player supplements program, specifically regarding the alleged use of the banned peptide Thymosin beta-4. On 27 August 2013, the AFL found the club guilty of bringing the game into disrepute for establishing a program that was "experimental, inappropriate and inadequately vetted". The club was fined A$2 million, stripped of early draft picks, and disqualified from the 2013 finals series. Senior coach James Hird was suspended for twelve months, and several executives, including chairman David Evans and CEO Ian Robson, resigned.

Despite the AFL Anti-Doping Tribunal initially clearing the players in March 2015, the World Anti-Doping Agency (WADA) appealed the decision. On 12 January 2016, the Court of Arbitration for Sport overruled the AFL tribunal, finding 34 past and present players guilty of taking the banned substance. The players were suspended for the entire 2016 season. Forced to field a team composed heavily of VFL top-up players, Essendon claimed the wooden spoon in 2016 for the first time since 1933.

Following the conclusion of the saga, Essendon made intermittent finals appearances, qualifying in 2017, 2019, and 2021 under coaches John Worsfold and Ben Rutten, but suffered elimination final defeats each time. The club has struggled to achieve significant post-season success, enduring a drought of finals victories that stretches back to 2004.

=== Brad Scott Era (2023–2026) ===
In 2023, reports emerged claiming that the club was reconsidering its logo. These included rumours that the bomber logo was insensitive due to the operation of bomber jets in conflict. These reports were denied by then-captain Zach Merrett.

At the end of the 2023 season, it was announced that former West Coast and Gold Coast player Matt Rosa would join Essendon as Talent & Operations Manager and that Adrian Dodoro would step back from his position of recruiting manager after the upcoming trade and draft periods.

In Brad Scott's first season as coach, Essendon sat in fifth position after round 17, but their form fell off later in the season to finish 11th with 11 wins and 12 losses.

In Brad Scott's second season as coach, Essendon finished with a win–draw–loss record of 11–1–11.

On 13 August 2024 club champion Dyson Heppell announced he would retire at the end of the season after playing 253 games for the club. Heppell was the final player of the Essendon 34 still playing at the club.

Brad Scott’s third season as coach was less successful, with Essendon finishing the season with just 6 wins and 17 losses, failing to win a game after Round 11. The season was marked by injury, resulting in the bombers breaking the record for the most players debuted in a season at 15, surpassing Fitzroy who previously held the record with 13 debutants. Essendon announced part way through the season that head of high performance Suan Murphy and the club would part ways. Mathew Inness was announced as his replacement in September after the end of the season.

During the 2026 AFL Season, Essendon parted ways with senior coach Brad Scott, despite him having a year remaining on his contract. The Club's board cited a "lack of progress" and failure to meet key performance indicators as the primary reasons for his termination. This decision followed a severe downturn in on-field performance, in which the Bombers recorded only one victory from a 24-game period, spanning the 2025 and 2026 Seasons. Following Brad Scott's departure, assistant coach Dean Solomon was appointed interim senior coach for the remainder of the season.

=== Mark McVeigh Era (2026–present) ===
On Monday 24th of August 2026, Mark McVeigh was appointed Senior Coach of Essendon, a three year contract running through to the end of the 2029 AFL season. Club President Andrew Welsh said the decision was unanimously supported by the club board, and stating in a press release that "we have been extremely clear on the strategy and direction of this football club. We are building the next successful era for Essendon, with a view to playing finals, winning finals and competing for premierships. Mark is the best coach to take us forward to achieve that." The McVeigh era begun by trading 7-time Crichton Medal winner and former captain Zach Merrett to Hawthorn.

== Club symbols ==
=== Guernsey ===
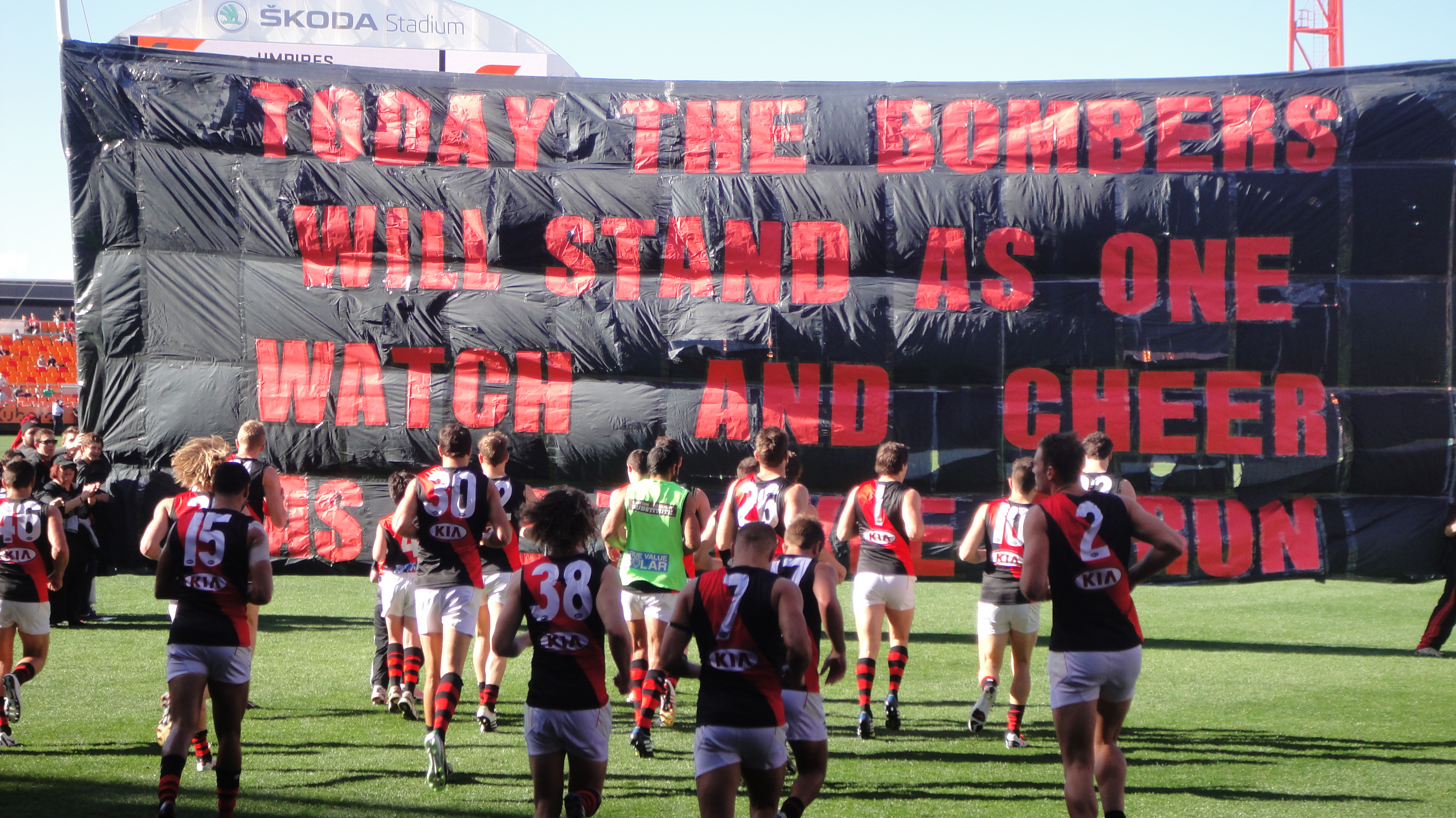
Essendon players traditionally run through a banner which is created by its supporters before their matches.

Essendon's first recorded jumpers were navy blue (The Footballers, edited by Thomas Power, 1875) although the club wore 'red and black caps and hose'. In 1877, The Footballers records the addition of 'a red sash over left shoulder'. This is the first time a red sash as part of the club jumper, and by 1878 there are newspaper reports referring to Essendon players as 'the men in the sash'.

Given that blue and navy blue were the most popular colours at the time, it is thought that Essendon adopted a red sash in 1877 to distinguish its players from others in similar-coloured jumpers.

==== Clash jumpers ====
In 2007, the AFL Commission laid down the requirement that all clubs must produce an alternative jumper for use in matches where jumpers are considered to clash. From 2007 to 2011, the Essendon clash guernsey was the same design as its home guernsey, but with a substantially wider sash such that the guernsey was predominantly red rather than predominantly black. This was changed after 2011 when the AFL deemed that the wider sash did not provide sufficient contrast.

From 2012 to 2016, Essendon's clash guernsey was predominantly grey, with a red sash fimbriated in black; the grey field contained, in small print, the names of all Essendon premiership players.

Before the 2016 season, Essendon's changed their clash guernsey to a predominantly red one, featuring a red sash outlined in black. Similar to the grey jumper, the names of Essendon premiership players were also printed outside the sash.

The 2025 season saw Essendon unveil a new away/clash guernsey, which is red with a black sash, a reverse of the home guernsey.

==== Yellow armbands ====
Following Adam Ramanauskas's personal battle with cancer, a "Clash for Cancer" match against Melbourne was launched in 2006. This was a joint venture between Essendon and the Cancer Council of Victoria to raise funds for the organisation. Despite a formal request to the AFL being denied, players wore yellow armbands for the match, which resulted in the club being fined $20,000. In 2007, the AFL agreed to allow yellow armbands to be incorporated into the left sleeve of the jumper. The 'Clash for Cancer' match against Melbourne has become an annual event, repeated in subsequent seasons, though in 2012, 2013, 2014 and 2016, Hawthorn (twice), the Sydney Swans and Brisbane Lions were the opponents in those respective seasons instead of Melbourne. In 2009, the jumpers were auctioned along with yellow boots worn by some players during the match.

=== Club song ===
The club's theme song, "See the Bombers Fly Up", is thought to have been written c. 1959 by Kevin Andrews in the home of player Jeff Gamble at which time Kevin Andrews was living. The song is based on the tune of Johnny Hamp 's 1929 song "(Keep Your) Sunny Side Up" at an increased tempo. Jeff Gamble came up with the line 'See the bombers fly up, up' while Kevin Andrews contributed all or most of the rest. At the time, "(Keep Your) Sunny Side Up" was the theme song for the popular Melbourne-based TV show on Channel 7 Sunnyside Up. The official version of the song was recorded in 1972 by the Fable Singers and is still used.

The song, as with all other AFL clubs, is played prior to every match and at the conclusion of matches when the team is victorious.

See the Bombers fly up, up!
To win the premiership flag.
Our boys who play this grand old game,
Are always striving for glory and fame!
See the Bombers fly up, up,
The other teams they don't fear;
They all try their best,
But they can't get near,
As the Bombers fly up!

Songwriter Mike Brady, of "Up There Cazaly" fame, penned an updated version of the song in 1999 complete with a new verse arrangement, but it was not well received. However, this version is occasionally played at club functions. In 2018, Andrews revealed that there was an error in the lyrics, in which in the line "The other teams they don't fear", the word "they" was supposed to be "we".

=== Logo and mascot ===
The club's current logo was introduced in 1998, making it the oldest AFL logo in use.

Their mascot is known as "Skeeta Reynolds", and was named after Dick Reynolds. He is a mosquito and was created in honour of the team's back-to-back premiership sides in the 1920s known as the "Mosquito Fleet". He was first named through a competition run in the Bomber magazine with "Skeeta" being the winning entry. This was later changed to "Skeeta Reynolds". He appears as a red mosquito in an Essendon jumper and wears a red and black scarf.

=== Home ground and training base ===
Essendon's primary home ground was Windy Hill Oval, where the club played home matches from 1922 to 1991. Prior to this, the club played at the defunct East Melbourne Cricket Ground. In 1992, the club ceased playing senior matches at Windy Hill and moved games to the Melbourne Cricket Ground (MCG). In 2000, the club shifted the majority of its home games to the newly constructed Docklands Stadium, while retaining high-drawing fixtures at the MCG. This arrangement usually resulted in seven games at Docklands and four at the MCG, though in 2026, the club succeeded in persuading the AFL to fixture an additional home game at the MCG, resulting in six at Docklands Stadium and five at the MCG.

Since October 2013, the Essendon Football Club's primary training and administration base has been at The Hangar, a purpose-built training facility located in Melbourne Airport. Prior to this, Essendon’s training and administration base was at the club's long-standing home ground of Windy Hill Oval.

== Membership ==
Year	Total Members
1984	10,231
1985	11,376
1986	12,607
1987	8,129
1988	8,432
1989	7,958
1990	11,046
1991	11,593
1992	10,034
1993	11,546
1994	19,720
1995	23,833
1996	24,324
1997	28,063
1998	27,099
1999	29,858
2000	34,278
2001	36,227
2002	35,219
2003	31,970
2004	33,469
2005	32,734
2006	32,511
2007	32,759
2008	41,947
2009	40,412
2010	40,589
2011	50,275
2012	47,708
2013	56,172
2014	60,714
2015	61,317
2016	57,494
2017	67,768
2018	79,319
2019	84,237
2020	66,686
2021	81,662
2022	86,001
2023	86,274
2024	83,664
2025	85,568

== Rivalries ==
Essendon's biggest rivals are Carlton, Richmond, and Collingwood, as these teams and Essendon are the four biggest and most supported clubs in Victoria. Matches between the clubs are often close regardless of form and ladder positions. If out of the race themselves, all four have the desire to deny the others a finals spot or a premiership. Essendon also has a fierce rivalry with Hawthorn, stemming from excessive on-field violence in the 1980s, perhaps reaching its zenith with the infamous Line in the Sand Match in 2004. Additionally, Essendon has a three-decade rivalry with the West Coast Eagles.

- Carlton – The rivalry between Essendon and Carlton is considered one of the strongest in the league. With the teams sharing the record of 16 premierships, both sides are keen to become outright leader, or if out of the finals race, at least ensure the other doesn't. In recent years, the rivalry has thickened, with Carlton beating the 1999 Minor Premiers and premiership favourites by 1 point in the Preliminary Final. Other notable meetings between the two clubs include the 1908, 1947, 1949, 1962 and 1968 VFL Grand Finals and 1993 AFL Grand Final, with some decided by small margins. Of the 6 Grand Finals played out of the two clubs, Essendon has won 3 and Carlton has won 3.
- Collingwood – In the early days of the VFL, this rivalry grew out of several Grand Final meetings: 1901, 1902 and 1911. The teams didn't meet again in a Grand Final until 1990 when Collingwood won to draw level with the Bombers on 14 premierships and deny the Bombers a chance to join Carlton with 15 flags. Since 1995, the clubs face off against each other annually in the Anzac Day clash, a match which is described as the second biggest of the season (behind only the Grand Final). Being possibly the two biggest football clubs in Victoria, regardless of their position on the ladder, this game always attracts a huge crowd, and it is a match both teams have a great desire to win regardless of either team's season prospects. The rivalry thickened further in 2023 when Collingwood joined Essendon and Carlton with a record 16 premierships.
- Richmond – This rivalry stems out of the 1942 Grand Final which Essendon won. In 1974, a half-time brawl took place involving trainers, officials and players at Windy Hill and has become infamous as one of the biggest ever. The teams didn't meet in the finals between 1944 and 1995, but there have been many close margins in home and away season matches as a result of each team's "never say die" attitude and ability to come back from significant margins in the dying stages of matches. Having met in the AFL's Rivalry Round in (2006 and 2009) and meeting in the Dreamtime at the 'G match since 2005, the rivalry and passion between the clubs and supporters has re-ignited. In recent years the rivalry has been promoted as the "Clash of the Sash".
- Hawthorn – The two sides had a number of physical encounters in the mid-1980s when they were the top two sides of the competition. The rivalry was exacerbated when Dermott Brereton ran through Essendon's three-quarter time huddle during a match in 1988 and again by an all in brawl during a match in 2004 allegedly instigated by Brereton (now known as the Line in the Sand Match after the direction allegedly given by Brereton for the Hawthorn players to make a physical stand). This was reminiscent of the 1980s when battles with Hawthorn were often hard and uncompromising affairs. During Round 22 of the 2009 season, Essendon and Hawthorn played for the last finals spot up for grabs. The teams played out an extremely physical game and despite being 22 points down at half time Essendon went on to win by 17 points. The game included a brawl shortly after half time sparked by Essendon's captain Matthew Lloyd knocking out Hawthorn midfielder Brad Sewell, which led Hawthorn's Campbell Brown, to label Lloyd a 'sniper', and promised revenge if Lloyd played on in 2010.
- North Melbourne – One of the fiercest rivalries in the AFL can be traced back to 1896, when several clubs, including Essendon, broke away from the Victorian Football Association to form the Victorian Football League. North sought to join the breakaway competition, but some argue this desire was not realised due to Essendon feeling threatened by North's proximity and the fact their inclusion could drain Essendon of vital talent. More than 100 years later, some North supporters have not forgiven Essendon for the decision and have blamed the Bombers for their small supporter base and gate revenue. North were finally admitted into the VFL in 1925 alongside Footscray and Hawthorn. In 1950, the two sides met in their first and only grand final meeting to date, which Essendon won by 38 points. The rivalry would flare up again in the 1980s. In 1982, the Krakouer brothers, Jim and Phil, led the Roos to an Elimination Final win. Essendon had their revenge a year later, winning a Preliminary Final by 86 points. The rivalry was re-ignited in the late 1990s and early 2000s due to the on-field success of the two sides. In preparation for the 1998 finals series, and despite losing six of their last eight to the Roos, legendary Essendon coach Kevin Sheedy publicly labelled North executives Greg Miller and Mark Dawson soft in response to comments from commentators that his Essendon team was soft. The Kangaroos beat Essendon in the much-hyped encounter that followed (a Qualifying Final), and North fans pelted Sheedy with marshmallows as he left the ground, although Sheedy was seemingly unfazed by the incident, encouraging a "Marshmallow Game" the next year and relishing in the fact that Sheedy's ulterior motive was to build up the game and draw a large crowd, which proved to be correct, drawing in 71,154 people to attend the game. In 2000, the Bombers thrashed North by 125 points in the 1st Qualifying Final. The biggest VFL/AFL comeback of all time occurred between the two teams when Essendon managed to come back from a 69-point deficit to win by 12 points in 2001. A meeting of the two rivals at the MCG in the 2014 AFL finals series in the 2nd Elimination Final resulted in North winning by 12 points.
- West Coast – A three-decade rivalry between the Essendon Bombers and the West Coast Eagles kicked off when Essendon coach Kevin Sheedy tied the windsock down on the School End outer terrace so the opposition would not know which way the wind was blowing. Sheedy later said of the incident three decades later, in jest, that it was because the brand sponsor had neglected to pay their account. When West Coast won the toss and kicked against the breeze, it looked as if Sheedy's plan had worked. Nevertheless, West Coast would go on to win by 7 points. In his excitement at winning a close match in Round 16, 1993, with ruckman and forward Paul Salmon kicking a goal 30 seconds before the final siren against the West Coast Eagles (the reigning premiers), Sheedy waved his jacket in the air as he came rushing from the coaches' box. To this day, the supporters of the winning club wave their jackets in the air after the game when the two teams play. The moment is captured in Jamie Cooper's painting the Game That Made Australia, commissioned by the AFL in 2008 to celebrate the 150th anniversary of the sport, with Sheedy shown waving a red, black and yellow jacket rather than a red and black jacket, to reflect Sheedy's support of indigenous footballers. The Bombers would go on to defeat West Coast again later that year in their semi-final clash and take home the 1993 premiership cup a couple of weeks later. Despite Sheedy's typically measured disposition, Sheedy did lose his cool on one occasion in 2000. In yet another game against the Eagles, Sheedy was fined $7,500 by the tribunal after making a cut-throat gesture to then-Eagle Mitchell White during the half-time break of the Essendon–West Coast clash in Round 15, 2000, also apparently mouthing the words "You... are... fucked!" to White. In a famous game in 2004, with 35 seconds remaining and the scores deadlocked at 131 points apiece, Essendon legend James Hird swooped on a loose ball in the right forward pocket and snapped a match-winning goal with his 15th possession for the quarter, famously hugging an Essendon supporter in the crowd in a moment of jubilation after being fined $20,000 earlier in the week for criticising umpire Scott McLaren. Full-forward Matthew Lloyd also kicked eight goals during the game to net three Brownlow votes. Despite Hird's incredible individual effort, and to the consternation of fans and the audience of the 2004 Brownlow medal count, he did not receive any Brownlow Medal votes from the umpires for his 34 disposals and clutch goals, which some have speculated was in retribution for his tirade against umpire McLaren.

== Organisation and finance ==
=== Board ===
Andrew Welsh has served as President of the board since September 2025, with Vice-President Anthony Di Pietro serving since March 2026.

Essendon's board members are Andrew Welsh, Tim Roberts, David Wills, Dorothy Hisgrove, Andrew Muir, Kate O'Sullivan, Anthony Howard AM KC, and Catriona Larritt.

=== Sponsorship ===
The club's apparel is produced by Puma. The club's apparel has also been produced by Reebok, Fila, Adidas, ISC and Under Armour.

==== AFL ====
Year	Kit Manufacturer	Major Sponsor	Shorts Sponsor	Bottom Back Sponsor	Top Back Sponsor
1977–83	–	Don Smallgoods	–	–	-
1984–92	–	Nubrik	–	–	-
1993	–	Nubrik	Don Smallgoods	–	-
1994–95	–	Speed Kills TAC	Delta	Speed Kills TAC	-
1996–97	–	Speed Kills TAC	Reebok	Speed Kills TAC	-
1998	Reebok	Speed Kills TAC	Rebel	Speed Kills TAC	-
1999	Reebok	Speed Kills TAC	Musashi	Speed Kills TAC	-
2000	Fila	Speed Kills TAC	Musashi	Speed Kills TAC	-
2001–02	Fila	Orange	Musashi	Orange	-
2003–04	Puma	3 Mobile	IMB	3 Mobile	-
2005	Puma	3 Mobile	–	3 Mobile	-
2006–07	Puma	3 Mobile	Abey	3 Mobile	-
2008	Puma	3 Mobile	Samsung	3 Mobile	-
2009–10	Adidas	Samsung	Antler	Samsung	-
2011	Adidas	Samsung (Home) True Value Solar (Away)	Toll	True Value Solar (Home) Samsung (Away)	-
2012	Adidas	True Value Solar (Home) Kia Motors (Away)	Toll	Kia Motors (Home) True Value Solar (Away)	-
2013	Adidas	Kia Motors (Home) True Value Solar (Away)	Toll	True Value Solar (Home) Kia Motors (Away)	-
2014	Adidas	Fujitsu (Home) Kia Motors (Away)	Toll	Kia Motors (Home) Fujitsu (Away)	-
2015	Adidas	Kia Motors (Home) Fujitsu (Away)	Toll	Fujitsu (Home) Kia Motors (Away)	-
2016	Adidas	Fujitsu (Home) Kia Motors (Away)	Toll	Kia Motors (Home) Fujitsu (Away)	-
2017	ISC	Kia Motors (Home) Fujitsu (Away)	Border Express	Fujitsu (Home) Kia Motors (Away)	-
2018	ISC	Fujitsu (Home) Kia Motors (Away)	Border Express	Kia Motors (Home) Fujitsu (Away)	-
2019	ISC	Amart Furniture (Home) Fujitsu (Away)	Border Express	Fujitsu (Home) Amart Furniture (Away)	-
2020	Under Armour	Amart Furniture (Home) Fujitsu (Away)	Coles Insurance	Fujitsu (Home) Amart Furniture (Away)	Fujitsu (Home) Amart Furniture (Away)
2021	Under Armour	Fujitsu (Home) Amart Furniture (Away)	Coles Insurance	Amart Furniture (Home) Fujitsu (Away)	Liberty Financial
2022	Under Armour	Fujitsu (Home) Amart Furniture (Away)	Tradie	Amart Furniture (Home) Fujitsu (Away)	Liberty Financial
2023	Under Armour	Amart Furniture (Home) Fujitsu (Away)	Tradie	Fujitsu (Home) Amart Furniture (Away)	Liberty Financial
2024	Under Armour	Fujitsu (Home) Dutton Automotive (Away)	Tradie	Dutton Automotive (Home) Fujitsu (Away)	Liberty Financial
2025	Puma	Dutton Automotive (Home) Fujitsu (Away)	Tradie	Fujitsu (Home) Dutton Automotive (Away)	Liberty Financial

==== AFL Women's ====
Year	Kit Manufacturer	Major Sponsor	Shorts Sponsor	Bottom Back Sponsor	Top Back Sponsor
2022 S7	Cotton On	Fujitsu (Home); Toyota Forklifts (Away)	Coles	Toyota Forklifts (Home); Fujitsu (Away)	Liberty Financial
2023	Cotton On	Toyota Forklifts (Home/Away); Fujitsu (Clash)	Coles	Airstage (Home/Away); Toyota Forklifts (Clash)	Liberty Financial

== Honours ==
See Essendon Football Club honours.

=== Club achievements ===
Premierships
Competition	Level	Wins	Years won
Australian Football League	Seniors	16	1897, 1901, 1911, 1912, 1923, 1924, 1942, 1946, 1949, 1950, 1962, 1965, 1984, 1985, 1993, 2000
Australian Football League	Reserves (1923–1999)	6	1941, 1950, 1952, 1968, 1983, 1992, 1999
Australian Football League	Under 19s (1946–1991)	5	1950, 1952, 1959, 1961, 1966
VFL Women's	Reserves	1	2022
Victorian Football Association	Seniors (1877–1896)	4	1891, 1892, 1893, 1894
Other titles and honours
AFL pre-season competition	Seniors	4	1990, 1993, 1994, 2000
McClelland Trophy	Seniors	9	1951, 1953, 1957, 1968, 1989, 1993, 1999, 2000, 2001
Championship of Australia	Seniors	1	1893
AFC Night Series	Seniors	2	1981, 1984
Lightning Premiership	Seniors	3	1896, 1943, 1996
Finishing positions
Australian Football League	Minor premiership	17	1898, 1911, 1923, 1924, 1942, 1946, 1948, 1950, 1962, 1968, 1984, 1985, 1990, 1993, 1999, 2000, 2001
Australian Football League	Grand Finalist	14	1898, 1902, 1908, 1941, 1943, 1947, 1948, 1951, 1957, 1959, 1968, 1983, 1990, 2001
Australian Football League	Wooden spoons	6	1907, 1918, 1921, 1933, 2016, 2026
VFL Women's	Minor premiership	1	2022
VFL Women's	Wooden spoons	1	2018

=== Team of the Century ===
To celebrate the 125th anniversary of the club, as well as 100 years of the VFL/AFL, Essendon announced its "Team of the Century" in 1997.

Essendon Team of the Century
B:	Gavin Wanganeen 1991–96, 181 cm, 83 kg, 127 games, 64 goals	Fred Baring 1910–15/1918–24, 185 cm, 90 kg, 154 games, 92 goals	Tom Fitzmaurice 1918–20/1922–24, 192 cm, 96 kg, 85 games, 30 goals
HB:	Barry Davis 1961–72, 185 cm, 87 kg, 218 games, 65 goals	Wally Buttsworth 1939–49, 185 cm, 91 kg, 188 games, 2 goals	Harold Lambert 1940–41/1946–51, 175 cm, 76 kg, 99 games, 2 goals
C:	Reg Burgess 1954–60, 175 cm, 72 kg, 124 games, 9 goals	Jack Clarke 1951–67, 175 cm, 78 kg, 263 games, 180 goals	Michael Long 1989–2001, 178 cm, 80 kg, 190 games, 143 goals
HF:	James Hird 1992–2007, 188 cm, 89 kg, 253 games, 343 goals	Ken Fraser 1958–68, 187 cm, 80 kg, 198 games, 157 goals	Terry Daniher 1978–92, 188 cm, 89 kg, 294 games, 447 goals
F:	Bill Hutchison 1942–57, 174 cm, 70 kg, 290 games, 496 goals	John Coleman 1949–54, 185 cm, 80 kg, 98 games, 537 goals	Albert Thurgood 1899–1902/1906, 183 cm, 76 kg, 46 games, 89 goals
Foll:	Simon Madden 1974–92, 198 cm, 99 kg, 378 games, 575 goals	Tim Watson 1977–91/1993–94, 185 cm, 96 kg, 307 games, 335 goals	Dick Reynolds (c) 1933–51, 179 cm, 82 kg, 320 games, 442 goals
Int:	Mark Thompson 1983–96, 177 cm, 87 kg, 202 games, 50 goals	Keith Forbes 1928–37, 171 cm, 72 kg, 152 games, 415 goals	Frank Maher 1921–28, 170 cm, 70 kg, 137 games, 124 goals
Int:	William Griffith 1899–1913, 175 cm, 76 kg, 187 games, 13 goals		
Coach:	Kevin Sheedy 1981–2007; Coached 634, Won 386, Lost 242, Drew 6		

=== Champions of Essendon ===
In 2002, a club panel chose and ranked the 26 greatest players to have played for Essendon.

1. Dick Reynolds
2. John Coleman
3. James Hird
4. Bill Hutchison
5. Simon Madden
6. Tim Watson
7. Ken Fraser
8. Jack Clarke
9. Albert Thurgood
10. Tom Fitzmaurice
11. Terry Daniher
12. Wally Buttsworth
13. Reg Burgess
14. Bill Busbridge
15. Barry Davis
16. Keith Forbes
17. Graham Moss
18. Mark Harvey
19. Gavin Wanganeen
20. Mark Thompson
21. John Birt
22. Matthew Lloyd
23. Michael Long
24. Fred Baring
25. Thomas Snibson
26. Harold Lambert

=== Hall of Fame ===
Essendon Hall of Fame Legends (year inducted): Bill Brew (2013), Bill Busbridge (1996), Jack Clarke (1996), John Coleman (1996), Bill Cookson (1996), Wally Crichton (2010), Terry Daniher (1996), Barry Davis (2006), Ron Evans (2012), Tom Fitzmaurice (1996), Ken Fraser (1996), Allan Hird Sr (1996), James Hird (2011), Harry Hunter (2015), Bill Hutchison (1996), Matthew Lloyd (2013), Simon Madden (1996), Alex McCracken (1996), Michael Long (2010), Howard Okey (2012), Frank Reid (1996), Dick Reynolds (1996), Greg Sewell (2009), Kevin Sheedy (2008), Albert Thurgood (1996), Tim Watson (1998), Neale Daniher* (2018), Dustin Fletcher*, Dr Bruce Reid* (2014), Gavin Wanganeen*

*denotes recent elevation to Legend status

Essendon Hall of Fame members (year inducted): Noel Allanson (2015), Fred Baring (2013), John Birt (2010), Reg Burgess (2015), Wally Buttsworth (2010), Barry Capuano (2014), Kevin Egan (2015), Alec Epis (2014), Ken Fletcher (2011), Keith Forbes (2010), Garry Foulds (2010), Darryl Gerlach (2013), Mark Harvey (2014), Bruce Heymanson (2013), Jack Jones (2012), Ron Kirwan (2016), Harold Lambert (2018), Scott Lucas (2013), Roy McConnell (2013), Don McKenzie (2010), Roger Merrett (2018), Joe Misiti (2012), Hugh Mitchell (2012), Graham Moss (2012), Gary O'Donnell (2014), Dr Ian Reynolds (2018), Paul Salmon (2012), David Shaw (2011), Arthur Showers (2010), George Stuckey (2010), Hugh Torney (2011), Paul Vander Haar (2015)

== Current squad ==
Essendon Football Club · AFL personnel
Playing list		Inactive list	Coaching staff
1 Andrew McGrath (c); 2 Jacob Farrow; 3 Darcy Parish; 4 Kyle Langford; 6 Jye Caldwell; 8 Brayden Fiorini; 9 Sullivan Robey; 10 Isaac Kako; 12 Will Setterfield (A); 15 Dyson Sharp; 16 Archie Perkins; 17 Vigo Visentini; 18 Lewis Hayes; 20 Peter Wright; 21 Archie Roberts; 22 Sam Durham; 23 Harrison Jones; 24 Nick Bryan; 25 Jaxon Prior	26 Archie May (A); 27 Mason Redman; 28 Xavier Duursma; 29 Max Kondogiannis; 30 Nate Caddy; 31 Zach Reid; 32 Ben McKay; 33 Hussien El Achkar; 34 Jaxon Artemis (A); 36 Angus Clarke; 37 Nic Martin; 38 Rhys Unwin; 39 Cillian Bourke (B); 40 Zak Johnson; 42 Jayden Nguyen (B); 44 Archer Day-Wicks (A); 46 Lachlan Blakiston (A); Jack Bowes; Keidean Coleman		Senior coach: Mark McVeigh; Assistant coaches: Daniel Pratt (senior assistant); Brent Stanton (assistant); Paul Thomas (assistant); Michael Hurley (development); Toby McLean (development); Shane Mumford (development); Xavier O'Neill (development); Gary Rohan (development); Legend: (c) captain; (A) Category A rookie; (B) Category B rookie; Updated: 18 November 2026; Sources: Players (rookies); coaches

== Match records ==
- Highest score: 32.16 (208) v Footscray 9.8 (62) – Round 22, 1982, at Western Oval
- Lowest score: 0.9 (9) v Fitzroy 6.11 (47) – Round 1, 1899, at Brunswick Street Oval
- Lowest score since 1919: 1.12 (18) v St Kilda 5.5 (35) – Round 10, 1923, at Junction Oval
- Highest losing score: Essendon 21.13 (139) v Collingwood 23.6 (144), Round 22, 1987, M.C.G.
- Lowest winning score: Essendon 1.8 (14) v Melbourne 0.8 (8), Finals Week 3, 1897, Lake Oval (League record)
- Lowest winning score since 1919: Essendon 3.10 (28) v Footscray 3.5 (23), Round 13, 1989, Windy Hill
- Greatest winning margin: 165 points – Essendon 28.16 (184) v South Melbourne 2.7 (19), Round 18, 1964, Windy Hill
- Greatest losing margin: 163 points – Essendon 11.7 (73) v Sydney Swans 36.20 (236), Round 17, 1987, S.C.G.
- Record attendance (home-and-away game): 94,825 – 25 April 1995 at MCG v Collingwood (inaugural Anzac Day match)
- Record attendance (finals match): 116,828 – 1968 VFL Grand Final v Carlton

== Reserves team ==
Essendon

Names
- Full name: Essendon Football Club
- Former name: Essendon Juniors (1919−1922)
- Nickname(s): Bombers, Dons, Same Olds

2023 season
- Home-and-away season: 17th

Club details
- Founded: 1919, re-established 2013
- Competition: Victorian Football League
- Coach: Cameron Joyce
- Captain: Xavier O'Neill
- Premierships: VFL/AFL reserves (7): 1921; 1941; 1950; 1952; 1968; 1983; 1992; 1999
- Ground: Windy Hill (10,000)
- Training ground: The Hangar (2013–)

Uniforms
Home

The Essendon reserves are the reserves team of the club, playing in the Victorian Football League.

=== History ===
The team first competed in the Victorian Junior Football League (later the AFL reserves) when the competition was established in 1919, and was known as Essendon Juniors until the end of 1922.

The team enjoyed success in the form of eight premierships, including in the last year of the reserves competition in 1999. From 2000 until 2002, the club's reserves team competed in the Victorian Football League.

At the end of 2002, the club dissolved its reserves team and established a reserves affiliation with the Bendigo Football Club in the VFL. The affiliation ran for ten years from 2003 until 2012, allowing reserves players from the Essendon list to play with Bendigo. For all but the final year of the affiliation, Bendigo was known as the Bendigo Bombers.

The club re-established its reserves team in 2013, seeking greater developmental autonomy. The team plays its home games at Windy Hill. The team is made up of senior-listed AFL players and VFL-contracted players.

=== Premierships (7) ===
Year	Competition	Opponent	Score	Venue
1941	VFL seconds	Fitzroy	12.16 (88) – 9.17 (71)	MCG
1950	VFL seconds	North Melbourne	12.8 (80) – 8.7 (55)	MCG
1952	VFL seconds	Collingwood	7.14 (56) – 4.5 (29)	MCG
1968	VFL reserves	Richmond	15.7 (97) – 13.14 (92)	MCG
1983	VFL reserves	Collingwood	19.14 (128) – 15.9 (99)	MCG
1992	AFL reserves	Melbourne	18.19 (127) – 14.10 (94)	MCG
1999	AFL reserves	St Kilda	20.13 (133) – 11.10 (76)	MCG

=== Runners-up (10) ===
Year	Competition	Opponent	Score	Venue
1922	VJFA	Collingwood	1.9 (15) – 8.10 (58)	MCG
1924	VJFA	Geelong	N/A^{[a]}	Kardinia Park
1932	VFL seconds	Melbourne	4.10 (34) – 8.12 (60)	MCG
1949	VFL seconds	Melbourne	9.14 (68) – 17.10 (112)	MCG
1951	VFL seconds	Carlton	7.9 (51) – 8.15 (63)	MCG
1953	VFL seconds	Carlton	11.7 (73) – 15.7 (97)	MCG
1971	VFL reserves	Richmond	8.18 (66) – 14.14 (98)	MCG
1981	VFL reserves	Geelong	18.6 (114) – 21.14 (140)	MCG
1996	AFL reserves	North Melbourne	7.10 (52) – 23.18 (156)	MCG
1998	AFL reserves	Footscray	12.8 (80) – 20.16 (136)	MCG

^{a} Essendon refused to play the Grand Final in Geelong, so the premiership was awarded to Geelong.

== Women's teams ==
=== AFL Women's team ===
Essendon fielded a team in the AFL Women's (AFLW) competition from its seventh season. In March 2022, former North Melbourne AFLW player and Essendon VFLW captain Georgia Nanscawen was announced as the club's first AFLW player signing, and Western Bulldogs AFLW assistant coach Natalie Wood was announced as the club's first AFLW coach a week later. The club's AFLW coaching panel was finalised in late June.

==== AFL Women's squad ====
Essendon Football Club · AFL Women's personnel
Playing list		Inactive list	Coaching staff
1 Emily Gough; 2 Georgia Gee; 3 Daria Bannister; 4 Maddy Prespakis; 5 Georgia Nanscawen; 6 Maddi Gay (vc); 7 Grace Belloni; 8 Bonnie Toogood (c); 10 Holly Ridewood; 11 Nalu Brothwell; 12 Bess Keaney; 13 Taya Chambers; 14 Maggie Johnstone	15 Chloe Adams; 16 Matilda Dyke; 17 Georgia Clarke; 19 Emma Dineen; 20 Steph Cain; 23 Amy Gaylor; 25 Alex Morcom; 26 Zoe Prowse; 27 Sophie Van De Heuvel; 28 Mia Busch; 30 Steph Wales; 33 Courtney Murphy; 34 Madison Ibrahim		Senior coach: Vacant; Assistant coaches: Rohan McHugh (back line); Natasha Hardy (midfield); Ben Brown (forward line); Christina Bernardi (development); Legend: (c) captain; (vc) vice-captain; Updated: 18 November 2026; Sources: Players, coaches

=== VFL Women's team ===
Essendon has fielded a team in the VFL Women's (VFLW) competition since the 2018 season. The league is the highest-grade competition for female footballers in Victoria and one of three second-tier female competitions underneath the national AFL Women's.

==== VFL Women's season summaries ====
Essendon VFLW honour roll
Season	Final position	Coach	Captain	Best and fairest	Leading goalkicker
2018	13th	Brendan Major	Lisa Williams	Hayley Bullas	Alexandra Quigley (7)
2019	9th	Brendan Major	Courtney Ugle	Georgia Nanscawen	Alexandra Quigley (10)
2020	Season cancelled due to the impact of the COVID-19 pandemic				
2021	3rd	Brendan Major	Georgia Nanscawen	Eloise Ashley-Cooper	Mia-Rae Clifford (16)
2022	Premiers	Brendan Major	Georgia Nanscawen/Mia-Rae Clifford	Georgia Nanscawen	Federica Frew (35)
2023	5th	Travis Cloke	Mia-Rae Clifford/Courtney Ugle	Sophie Molan	Mia-Rae Clifford (11)
2024	5th	Cherie O'Neill	El Chaston	El Chaston	Olivia Manfre (9)
2025	6th	Cherie O'Neill	El Chaston	El Chaston	Tia Davidge (14)

Sources: Club historical data VFLW 2017-21 stats and VFLW 2021-present stats

== Other ventures ==
In December 2017, Essendon entered e-sports by acquiring Australian League of Legends team Abyss ESports. This made them the second AFL team to acquire an e-sports division after Adelaide acquired Legacy ESports in May.

On 2 December 2019, it was announced that the Bombers' OPL slot had been sold to Perth-based internet provider Pentanet, marking Essendon's exit from the e-sports arena.

In 2018, the Essendon Football Club, along with four other AFL clubs, entered the Victorian Wheelchair Football League.

== Activism ==
=== Aboriginal support ===
Starting with Norm McDonald in 1947, Essendon has a proud history of fostering Aboriginal talent at the top level. This came to the fore during the 1990s with players such as Michael Long, Derek Kickett, Gavin Wanganeen, and Dean Rioli rising through the ranks and being fostered by Kevin Sheedy. Dreamtime at the 'G and the Long Walk are two prominent annual events staged to help promote and support Aboriginal culture. The Long Walk, specifically, is designed to raise money for Indigenous education programs across the country.

Additionally, Essendon is a supporter of the Voice to Parliament.

=== Same-Sex Marriage ===
During the Australian Marriage Law Postal Survey, Essendon supported the Yes vote.

== See also ==
- Dreamtime at the 'G
- Sport in Australia
- Sport in Victoria
