= Dutton Group =

Automotive company

Dutton Group is an Australian-based automotive company headquartered in Richmond, Victoria. The Group specializes in the automotive wholesale and the pre-owned automotive market. Dutton group consists of nine separate organizations:

- Dutton Garage
- Dutton Wholesale
- Dutton One
- Dutton Financial Services
- Dutton Procurement
- Sell Your Car Fast
- Auto MegaWarehouse
- Targa Australia
- Classic Throttle Shop

Dutton Group is the largest car wholesaler in Australia, moving over 25,000 units in 2021, up from only 12,000 in 2014. It also holds the largest classic and rare car collections in the southern Hemisphere.

== History ==
=== Early history ===
In 1999, George Nakas and Gavin Fernandez established a private investment firm in Australia, under the name, Morgan Sachs Group. It later changed its name to the Dutton Group. During the next few years, the company owned a diverse range of business across the automotive, renewable energy and real estate markets. It established Melbourne Prestige, focusing on the wholesale market and became Australia's first national automotive dealer.

From 2008 onwards, the group's operations grew rapidly. This began with the acquisition of the well-known Australian motoring-brand, James Lane Motors. The group reported wholesale sales of 5,000 for 2009, making it the leading automotive wholesale trader in Australia. During the same year, the company diversified its portfolio by moving into the renewable energy market, becoming a major shareholder in True Value Solar. Over the next couple of years, True Value Solar experienced rapid growth, becoming the largest solar provider in residential and commercial projects in Australia.

True Value Solar completed over 60,000 installations, staff numbers grew to 240 by the end of 2011 and it had an estimated turnover of $200 million. In March 2011, the German-based company, M+W purchased a 65 percent stake in True Value Solar. It was reported in the media that the figure was “north of $100 million.” The remaining 35 percent was then acquired by M+W a year later in March 2013.

=== LED and Automotive ===
In 2012, Dutton Group entered into its second energy venture, acquiring shares in LEDified Lighting Corporation. During the same year, the lighting firm became the major sponsor of St Kilda football club. The Group evolved its automotive operations by the end of 2012, adding a luxury automotive subsidiary to the portfolio, acquiring Dutton Sporting Cars, which became a wholly owned subsidiary of the Group. Dutton Sporting Cars would later operate under the name Dutton Garage. Dutton Garage became the luxury arm of the Group. With its headquarters in Melbourne, Dutton Garage specializes in the sale of luxury and classic sports cars to the retail markets worldwide.

Dutton Motorsport, a division of Dutton Garage was also acquired through the purchase and added to the group portfolio. In 2013, the LEDified Lighting Corporation subsidiary reported revenues of $20 million. By July 2013, the Group continued its expansion within the Australian automotive space, establishing Sell Your Car Fast. The introduction of Sell Your Car Fast to the Australian market provided consumers with an alternative channel to sell their cars directly to the business. At the end of 2013, Dutton Group sold their shares in LEDified Lighting Corporation, which was described in the media as a "multi-million dollar deal".

During 2013, the Group consolidated its group structure, the Group name was changed to Dutton Group, and the automotive division was restructured so that four major brand groups with differentiated profiles would be formed. Dutton Garage Wholesale focused on the automotive wholesale trade, Dutton Garage would become the retail arm of the business, focusing on the sale of the luxury and classic vehicles to the retail market. Dutton Motorsport focused on the Group's global motorsport activities, as well the restoration and maintenance of specialized classic and motorsport vehicles. Sell Your Car Fast focused on the acquisition of passenger vehicles from the general consumer. In 2014, the Group's automotive division generated $275 million in revenue.

On 5 December 2014, Dutton Garage opened a new purpose-built retail showroom, located in Richmond, Victoria, Australia. The building cost $30 million and was designed by Karl Fender. It now houses some of the most collectible classic and modern sports cars in the world. Dutton Garage also holds a private collection of some of the rarest motorsport and classic cars in the world, including the 1974 Porsche 911 RSR IROC, Mark Donohue champion winning car, the Formula 2 Cooper T75-BRM piloted by Jackie Stewart in the 1960s, and the Blaupunkt Porsche 962C.

In mid-2015, Dutton Garage made its first step expanding outside of its Australian operations, signing a joint-venture partnership with UK based classic car dealer, DD Classics. The partnership reflected the company's international growth strategy and expanded its reach across Europe and Australasia. In FY16, the group reported $427.7 million in revenue.

== Ownership ==
Dutton Group is owned by Japanese conglomerate Sojitz as of May 2023. It was acquired for more than $250 million. Formerly, Dutton Group was co-owned by Gavin Fernandez, George Nakas, and CPE Equity.

Both Gavin Fernandez and George Nakas were listed in the 2013, 2014 and 2015 BRW's Young Rich List.
