= 2026 Essendon Football Club season =

152nd season of the Essendon Football Club

2026 AFL season
- President: Dave Barham
- Coach: Brad Scott (until 26 May); Dean Solomon (Interim) (from 26 May)
- Captains: Andrew McGrath
- Home ground: MCG; Marvel Stadium

The 2026 Essendon Football Club season is the 127th season of the Essendon Football Club playing in the Australian Football League (AFL) and the club's 152nd season overall. Following a difficult 2025 campaign where the team finished 15th with only six wins, the Bombers entered 2026 looking to rebuild under fourth-year coach Brad Scott and new captain Andrew McGrath. The club bolstered its list at the 2025 Draft by securing top-10 prospects Sullivan Robey and Jacob Farrow, alongside trading for veteran midfielder Brayden Fiorini. The club is also fielding reserves teams in the Victorian Football League (VFL) and VFL Women's (VFLW), and will field a team in the AFL Women's (AFLW).

== AFL ==
The 2026 season has proven challenging for the club. Scott was removed as senior coach after Essendon's round 11 loss to Richmond, their 10th loss of the season, having only won one game of the past 24. Dean Solomon was appointed as the caretaker coach. A mid-season highlight saw the Bombers break a 13-match losing streak by defeating Greater Western Sydney in Round 19, marking their first win in Victoria since the previous year.

=== Practice matches ===
Date and local time	Opponent	Scores (Essendon's scores indicated in bold)			Venue	Attendance	Ref.
Date and local time	Opponent	Home	Away	Result	Venue	Attendance	Ref.
Friday, 20 February (10:00 am)	Richmond	**18.10 (118)**	10.8 (68)	Won by 50 points	NEC Hangar	?	
Friday, 27 February (3:10 pm)	St Kilda	17.13 (115)	**10.12 (72)**	Lost by 43 points	Mars Stadium	?	

=== Home-and-away season ===
Rd	Date and local time	Opponent	Scores (Essendon's scores indicated in bold)			Venue	Attendance	Position	Ref.
Rd	Date and local time	Opponent	Home	Away	Result	Venue	Attendance	Position	Ref.
1	Friday, 13 March (7:40 pm)	Hawthorn	**13.5 (83)**	21.19 (145)	Lost by 62 points	Melbourne Cricket Ground	71,384	17th	
2	Sunday, 22 March (2:45 pm)	Port Adelaide	20.13 (133)	**10.10 (70)**	Lost by 63 points	Adelaide Oval	36,049	18th	
3	Saturday, 28 March (7:35 pm)	North Melbourne	**9.15 (69)**	12.9 (81)	Lost by 12 points	Marvel Stadium	40,154	17th	
4	Sunday, 5 April (7:20 pm)	Western Bulldogs	14.15 (99)	**9.11 (65)**	Lost by 34 points	Marvel Stadium	38,786	17th	
5	Saturday, 11 April (12:45 pm)	Melbourne	**17.11 (113)**	10.8 (68)	Won by 45 points	Adelaide Oval	38,006	17th	
6	Saturday, 18 April (1:15 pm)	Gold Coast	17.17 (119)	**17.8 (110)**	Lost by 9 points	People First Stadium	19,039	17th	
7	Saturday, 25 April (3:20 pm)	Collingwood	**9.6 (60)**	20.17 (137)	Lost by 77 points	Melbourne Cricket Ground	92,231	17th	
8	Saturday, 2 May (12:35 pm)	Brisbane Lions	**11.13 (79)**	22.11 (143)	Lost by 64 points	Marvel Stadium	31,595	17th	
9	Saturday, 9 May (4:15 pm)	Greater Western Sydney	16.7 (103)	**13.11 (89)**	Lost by 14 points	Engie Stadium	9,416	17th	
10	Sunday, 17 May (1:10 pm)	Fremantle	**8.13 (61)**	16.8 (104)	Lost by 43 points	Melbourne Cricket Ground	25,100	17th	
11	Friday, 22 May (7:45 pm)	Richmond	10.14 (74)	**7.14 (56)**	Lost by 18 points	Melbourne Cricket Ground	78,815	18th	
12	Sunday, 31 May (5:20 pm)	West Coast	12.13 (85)	**8.7 (55)**	Lost by 30 points	Optus Stadium	37,623	18th	
13	Sunday, 7 June (7:20 pm)	Carlton	**10.7 (67)**	10.12 (72)	Lost by 5 points	Melbourne Cricket Ground	76,745	18th	
14	Saturday, 13 June (1:15 pm)	Melbourne	13.17 (95)	**6.14 (50)**	Lost by 45 points	Melbourne Cricket Ground	41,438	18th	
15	**BYE**								
16	Sunday, 28 June (3:15 pm)	North Melbourne	10.19 (79)	**9.11 (65)**	Lost by 14 points	Marvel Stadium	37,054	18th	
17	Sunday, 5 July (3:15 pm)	St Kilda	**7.8 (50)**	17.15 (117)	Lost by 67 points	Marvel Stadium	34,713	18th	
18	Sunday, 12 July (4:40 pm)	Brisbane Lions	22.17 (149)	**8.11 (59)**	Lost by 90 points	The Gabba	30,505	18th	
19	Sunday, 19 July (4:40 pm)	Greater Western Sydney	**10.7 (67)**	8.16 (64)	Won by 3 points	Marvel Stadium	14,601	17th	
20	Saturday, 25 July (4:15 pm)	Hawthorn	19.18 (132)	**5.9 (39)**	Lost by 93 points	Melbourne Cricket Ground	42,509	17th	—
21	Sunday, 2 August (4:40 pm)	Adelaide	**11.7 (73)**	23.7 (145)	Lost by 72 points	Marvel Stadium	20,518	18th	—
22	Saturday, 8 August (4:35 pm)	Geelong	17.15 (117)	**7.8 (50)**	Lost by 67 points	GMHBA Stadium	33,379	18th	—
23	Sunday, 16 August (4:40 pm)	Sydney	**11.10 (76)**	17.10 (112)	Lost by 36 points	Melbourne Cricket Ground	24,767	18th	—
24	Sunday, 23 August (12:20 pm)	Port Adelaide	**14.11 (95)**	16.9 (105)	Lost by 10 points	Marvel Stadium	29,200	18th	—

=== Ladder ===
Pos	Team	Pld	W	L	D	PF	PA	PP	Pts	Qualification
1	Fremantle	23	19	4	0	2286	1666	137.2	76	Finals series
2	Sydney	23	18	5	0	2543	1869	136.1	72	Finals series
3	Brisbane Lions (P)	23	16	7	0	2499	2054	121.7	64	Finals series
4	Hawthorn	23	15	6	2	2260	1881	120.1	64	Finals series
5	Geelong	23	15	8	0	2355	1925	122.3	60	Finals series
6	Adelaide	23	15	8	0	2169	1849	117.3	60	Finals series
7	Melbourne	23	15	8	0	2301	2099	109.6	60	Finals series
8	Western Bulldogs	23	13	9	1	1901	1992	95.4	54	Finals series
9	Collingwood	23	12	9	2	2021	1974	102.4	52	Finals series
10	Carlton	23	12	10	1	2007	1978	101.5	50	Finals series
11	St Kilda	23	10	13	0	2030	1974	102.8	40	
12	Greater Western Sydney	23	10	13	0	2073	2095	98.9	40	
13	Gold Coast	23	9	14	0	2011	2128	94.5	36	
14	North Melbourne	23	9	14	0	1932	2175	88.8	36	
15	Port Adelaide	23	7	16	0	1804	2048	88.1	28	
16	West Coast	23	4	19	0	1615	2333	69.2	16	
17	Richmond	23	3	20	0	1483	2373	62.5	12	
**18**	Essendon	**23**	**2**	**21**	**0**	**1601**	**2478**	**64.6**	8	

Source: afl.com.au
Rules for classification: 1) points; 2) percentage; 3) number of points for
(P) Premiers

== AFLW ==
=== List changes ===
==== Arrivals ====
Player	Former club	League	Type	Ref.
—	—	—	—	—

==== Departures ====
Player	New club	League	Type	Ref.
—	—	—	—	—

=== Playing list ===
No.	Player	AFLW debut	Recruited from	Ref
—	—	—	—	—

=== Home-and-away season ===
Rd	Date and local time	Opponent	Scores (Essendon's scores indicated in bold)			Venue	Attendance	Ref.
Rd	Date and local time	Opponent	Home	Away	Result	Venue	Attendance	Ref.
—	—	—	—	—	—	—	—	—

=== Ladder ===
Updated to the end of round 8.

Pos	Team	Pld	W	L	D	PF	PA	PP	Pts	Qualification
1	North Melbourne	8	7	1	0	507	195	260.0	28	Finals series
2	Melbourne	8	7	1	0	498	263	189.4	28	Finals series
3	Geelong	8	7	1	0	557	384	145.1	28	Finals series
4	Gold Coast	8	6	2	0	379	253	149.8	24	Finals series
5	Carlton	8	6	2	0	391	270	144.8	24	Finals series
6	Western Bulldogs	8	6	2	0	334	275	121.5	24	Finals series
7	Sydney	8	6	2	0	379	347	109.2	24	Finals series
8	Fremantle	8	4	4	0	326	290	112.4	16	Finals series
9	Hawthorn	8	4	4	0	342	359	95.3	16	
10	West Coast	8	4	4	0	329	392	83.9	16	
11	Richmond	8	4	4	0	323	403	80.1	16	
12	Adelaide	8	3	5	0	345	376	91.8	12	
13	Port Adelaide	8	3	5	0	275	349	78.8	12	
14	Brisbane	8	2	6	0	320	356	89.9	8	
15	Greater Western Sydney	8	1	7	0	315	441	71.4	4	
**16**	Essendon	**8**	**1**	**7**	**0**	**273**	**440**	**62.0**	4	
17	Collingwood	8	1	7	0	249	437	57.0	4	
18	St Kilda	8	0	8	0	185	497	37.2	0	

Source: afl.com.au
Rules for classification: 1) points; 2) percentage; 3) number of points for

== VFL ==
2026 VFL season
- Coach: Cameron Joyce
- Captain: Xavier O'Neill
- Home ground: NEC Hangar; Windy Hill

Cameron Joyce continued as Essendon's VFL senior coach for his second season in 2026.

=== Practice matches ===
Date and local time	Opponent	Scores (Essendon's scores indicated in bold)			Venue	Attendance	Ref.
Date and local time	Opponent	Home	Away	Result	Venue	Attendance	Ref.
Friday, 20 February (1:05pm)	Richmond	**18.13 (121)**	8.7 (55)	Won by 66 points	NEC Hangar	—	
Sunday, 1 March (11:00am)	St Kilda	**10.6 (66)**	16.11 (107)	Lost by 41 points	NEC Hangar	—	
Saturday, 14 March (2:00pm)	North Melbourne	14.11 (95)	**11.15 (81)**	Lost by 14 points	Arden Street Oval	—	

=== Home-and-away season ===
Rd	Date and local time	Opponent	Scores (Essendon's scores indicated in bold)			Venue	Attendance	Ref.
Rd	Date and local time	Opponent	Home	Away	Result	Venue	Attendance	Ref.
1	Friday, 20 March (7:05pm)	Geelong	24.19 (163)	**12.6 (78)**	Lost by 85 points	GMHBA Stadium	—	
2	Saturday, 28 March (12:35pm)	North Melbourne	**15.8 (98)**	12.7 (79)	Won by 19 points	NEC Hangar	—	
3	Sunday, 5 April (3:20pm)	Footscray	18.10 (118)	**10.11 (71)**	Lost by 47 points	Marvel Stadium	—	
4	Saturday, 18 April (9:30am)	Gold Coast	16.21 (117)	**19.9 (123)**	Won by 6 points	People First Stadium	—	
5	Friday, 24 April (2:05pm)	Collingwood	17.12 (114)	**15.13 (103)**	Lost by 11 points	KGM Centre	—	
6	Saturday, 2 May (2:05pm)	Williamstown	**11.9 (75)**	12.16 (88)	Lost by 13 points	Windy Hill	—	—
7	Sunday, 10 May (11:05am)	Greater Western Sydney	8.15 (63)	**17.12 (114)**	Won by 51 points	Tom Wills Oval	—	
8	**BYE**							
9	Saturday, 23 May (10:00am)	Richmond	14.5 (89)	**15.17 (107)**	Won by 18 points	Windy Hill	—	
10	Sunday, 31 May (12:05pm)	Werribee	**18.6 (114)**	27.12 (174)	Lost by 60 points	Windy Hill	—	
11	Sunday, 7 June (2:05pm)	Carlton	**14.9 (93)**	11.19 (85)	Won by 8 points	Windy Hill	—	
12	Sunday, 14 June (2:05pm)	Casey	16.11 (107)	**11.9 (75)**	Lost by 32 points	Casey Fields	—	
13	**BYE**							
14	Sunday, 28 June (12:05pm)	North Melbourne	14.8 (92)	**13.11 (89)**	Lost by 3 points	Arden Street Oval	—	
15	Sunday, 5 July (12:00pm)	St Kilda	**18.8 (116)**	13.13 (91)	Won by 25 points	Windy Hill	—	
16	Sunday, 12 July (10:00am)	Brisbane	10.13 (73)	**15.13 (103)**	Won by 30 points	Brighton Homes Arena	—	
17	Sunday, 19 July (10:00am)	Coburg	**17.11 (113)**	8.12 (60)	Won by 53 points	Windy Hill	—	
18	Saturday, 25 July (10:00am)	Box Hill	—	—	—	Box Hill City Oval	—	—
19	**BYE**							
20	Saturday, 8 August (12:05pm)	Collingwood	—	—	—	Windy Hill	—	—
21	TBC	Sydney	—	—	—	TBC	—	—

=== Ladder ===
Pos	Team	Pld	W	L	D	PF	PA	PP	Pts	Qualification
1	Geelong (R)	15	14	1	0	1628	903	180.3	56	Finals series
2	Werribee	15	11	3	1	1363	1145	119.0	46	Finals series
3	Box Hill	15	10	5	0	1396	1250	111.7	40	Finals series
4	Sydney (R)	15	9	5	1	1498	1179	127.1	38	Finals series
5	Greater Western Sydney (R)	14	9	5	0	1357	1223	111.0	36	Finals series
6	Frankston	15	9	6	0	1334	1265	105.5	36	Finals series
7	Port Melbourne	15	9	6	0	1245	1296	96.1	36	Finals series
8	Tasmania	15	8	6	1	1504	1366	110.1	34	Finals series
9	Williamstown	15	8	6	1	1342	1318	101.8	34	Finals series
10	Coburg	15	8	7	0	1306	1285	101.6	32	Finals series
11	Essendon (R)	15	8	7	0	1472	1513	97.3	32	
12	Carlton (R)	14	7	7	0	1299	1224	106.1	28	
13	St Kilda (R)	15	6	8	1	1286	1297	99.2	26	
14	North Melbourne (R)	14	6	7	1	1271	1285	98.9	26	
15	Southport	14	6	7	1	1269	1316	96.4	26	
16	Footscray (R)	14	6	8	0	1221	1202	101.6	24	
17	Casey	15	6	9	0	1241	1476	84.1	24	
18	Collingwood (R)	14	5	9	0	1225	1286	95.3	20	
19	Sandringham	15	4	10	1	1113	1467	75.9	18	
20	Brisbane (R)	14	3	11	0	1133	1362	83.2	12	
21	Richmond (R)	15	3	12	0	1045	1403	74.5	12	
22	Gold Coast (R)	14	2	12	0	1006	1493	67.4	8	

Updated to match(es) played on 19 July 2026. Source: AFL.com.au
Rules for classification: 1) points; 2) percentage; 3) number of points for
(R) Club is the reserves team of a senior club of the Australian Football League

== VFLW ==
=== Home-and-away season ===
Rd	Date and local time	Opponent	Scores (Essendon's scores indicated in bold)			Venue	Ref.
Rd	Date and local time	Opponent	Home	Away	Result	Venue	Ref.
1	Saturday, 16 May (12:05pm)	Sandringham	6.5 (41)	**5.8 (38)**	Lost by 3 points	Trevor Barker Beach Oval	
2	Saturday, 23 May (12:05pm)	Geelong Cats	**0.12 (12)**	4.8 (32)	Lost by 20 points	Windy Hill	
3	Saturday, 30 May (11:05am)	Williamstown	**2.4 (16)**	9.15 (69)	Lost by 53 points	Windy Hill	
4	Sunday, 7 June (11:05am)	Carlton	**10.3 (63)**	4.7 (31)	Won by 32 points	Windy Hill	
5	Sunday, 14 June (11:05am)	Casey	4.2 (26)	**10.2 (62)**	Won by 36 points	Casey Fields	
6	Saturday, 20 June (11:05am)	Collingwood	**2.2 (14)**	10.7 (67)	Lost by 53 points	Windy Hill	
7	Saturday, 27 June (3:05pm)	North Melbourne Werribee	11.8 (74)	**7.2 (44)**	Lost by 30 points	Arden Street Oval	
8	**BYE**						
9	Friday, 10 July (7:35pm)	Western Bulldogs	5.2 (32)	**3.4 (22)**	Lost by 10 points	Mission Whitten Oval	
10	Saturday, 18 July (11:05am)	Port Melbourne	**2.6 (18)**	6.12 (48)	Lost by 30 points	Windy Hill	
11	Saturday, 25 July (3:35pm)	Box Hill	—	—	—	Box Hill City Oval	—
12	Saturday, 1 August (1:05pm)	Tasmania	—	—	—	Windy Hill	—
13	Sunday, 9 August (10:35am)	Williamstown	—	—	—	DSV Stadium	—
14	Week of Monday, 10 August (TBC)	Sandringham	—	—	—	TBC	—
15	**BYE**						
16	Week of Monday, 24 August (TBC)	Darebin	—	—	—	TBC	—

=== Ladder ===
Pos	Team	Pld	W	L	D	PF	PA	PP	Pts	Qualification
1	North Melbourne Werribee	9	9	0	0	656	244	268.9	36	Finals series
2	Williamstown	9	8	1	0	422	150	281.3	32	Finals series
3	Collingwood	9	8	1	0	498	193	258.0	32	Finals series
4	Port Melbourne	9	6	3	0	353	309	114.2	24	Finals series
5	Carlton	9	5	4	0	441	338	130.5	20	Finals series
6	Western Bulldogs	8	5	3	0	238	275	86.5	20	Finals series
7	Sandringham	9	3	6	0	269	318	84.6	12	
8	Darebin	9	3	6	0	202	323	62.5	12	
9	Tasmania	9	3	6	0	261	383	68.1	12	
10	Geelong Cats	9	3	6	0	191	343	55.7	12	
11	Essendon	9	2	7	0	289	420	68.8	8	
12	Box Hill	9	2	7	0	278	462	60.2	8	
13	Casey	9	1	8	0	176	516	34.1	4	

Updated to match(es) played on 18 July 2026. Source: AFL.com.au
Rules for classification: 1) points; 2) percentage; 3) number of points for.
