= Amart =

Amart may refer to:

- Amart Sports, an Australian sporting goods store chain
- Amart Furniture, an Australian furniture store chain
- A.mart, a Taiwanese hypermarket chain
