= 1891 VFA season =

15th season of the Victorian Football Association

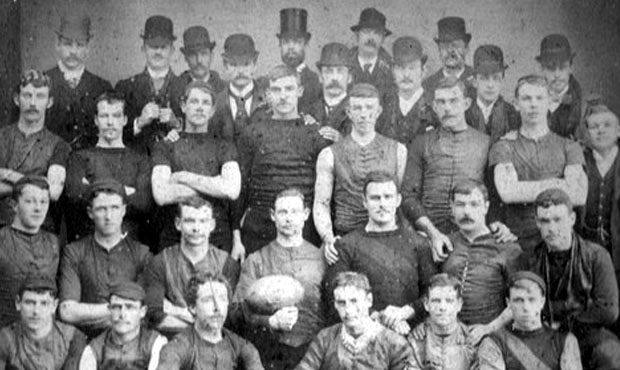
- Essendon – 1891 VFA premiers

Overview
- Date: 2 May – 26 September 1891
- Teams: 12
- Premiers: Essendon; 1st premiership

The 1891 VFA season was the 15th season of the Victorian Football Association (VFA), the highest-level senior Australian rules football competition in Victoria.

Essendon won the premiership for the first time, beginning a sequence of four consecutive premierships won from 1891 to 1894.

== Ladder ==
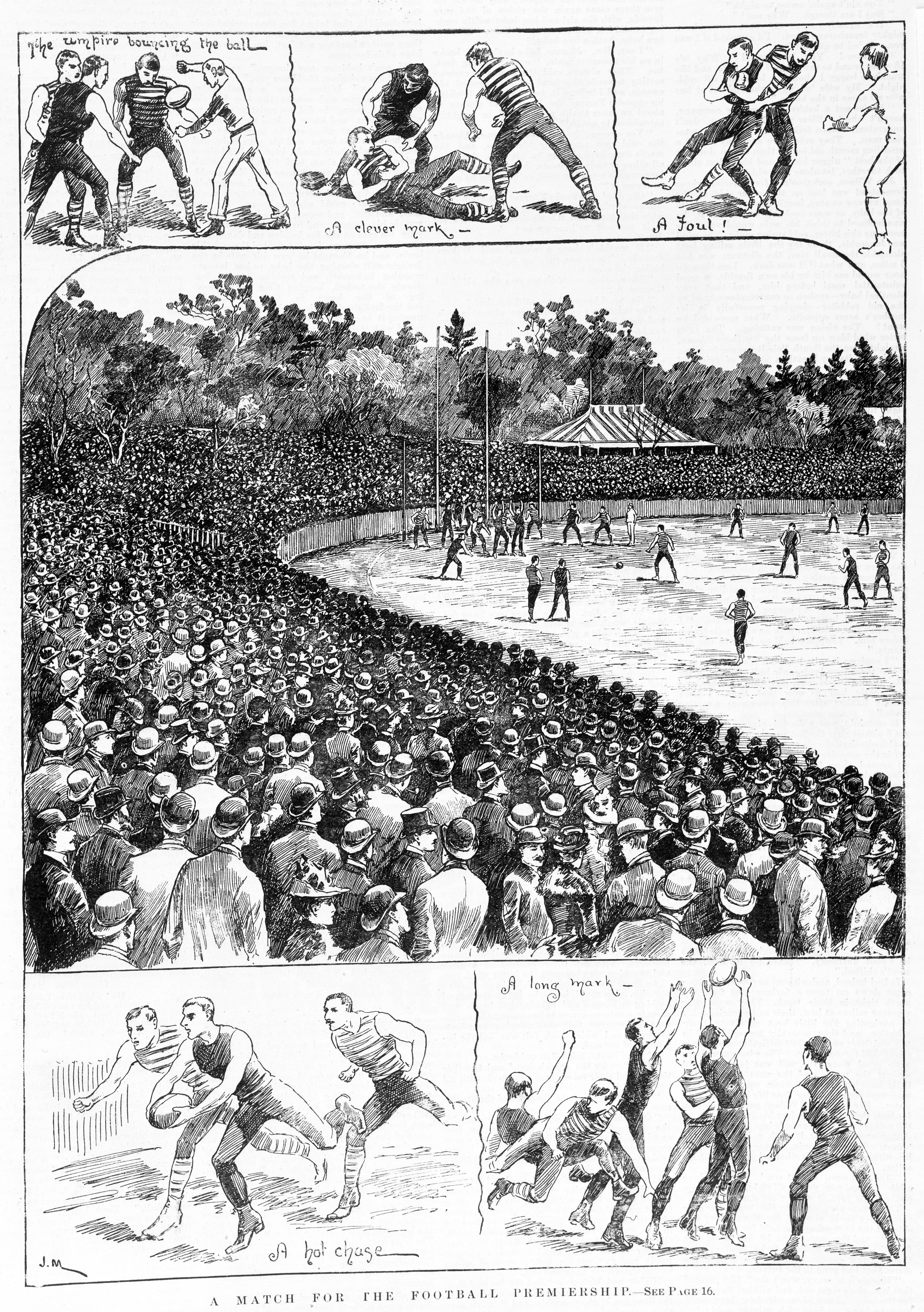
Scenes from an 1891 VFA Premiership Match between Essendon and Carlton

Teams did not play a uniform number of premiership matches during the season. As such, in the final standings, each team's premiership points were adjusted upwards proportionally to represent a 22-match season; e.g., Essendon played 20 matches, so its tally of premiership points was increased by a factor of 22/20. After this adjustment, there was no formal process for breaking a tie.

Pos	Team	Pld	W	L	D	GF	GA	Pts	Adj pts
1	Essendon (P)	20	17	1	2	125	66	72	79.20
2	Carlton	21	14	4	3	113	55	62	64.95
3	Fitzroy	19	12	5	2	110	70	52	60.21
4	South Melbourne	22	14	7	1	120	74	58	58.00
5	Geelong	19	12	7	0	90	74	48	55.58
6	Melbourne	19	8	6	5	88	84	42	48.63
7	St Kilda	20	8	11	1	92	97	34	37.40
8	North Melbourne	20	3	9	8	55	86	28	30.80
9	Williamstown	18	4	11	3	51	78	22	26.89
10	Footscray	18	4	13	1	58	95	18	22.00
11	Port Melbourne	19	3	13	3	61	103	18	20.84
12	Richmond	19	2	14	3	62	143	14	16.21

(P) Premiers

== Notable events ==
- Prior to the season, the distance between each goalpost and its adjacent kick-off post (behind post) was reduced from ten yards to seven yards, making each behind face the same width as the goal face, and establishing the modern measurements for the scoring area which have remained since.
- On 11 July, a torrential downpour from 3:00am saw the VFA grounds in Melbourne left at least partially underwater and made the conditions almost unplayable:
  - The match between Williamstown and North Melbourne was drawn by mutual agreement without taking the field due to torrential rain and the ground being completely flooded.
  - The match between St Kilda and Footscray at the Junction Oval saw only twelve Footscray players appear, with the ground covered in pools of water. Despite both teams' players, captains and officials objections to playing, the umpire overruled them and the match proceeded, with St Kilda (who had a full team of 20 players) winning by 10.5 to nil.
