= Andrew Welsh (footballer) =

Australian rules footballer, born 1983

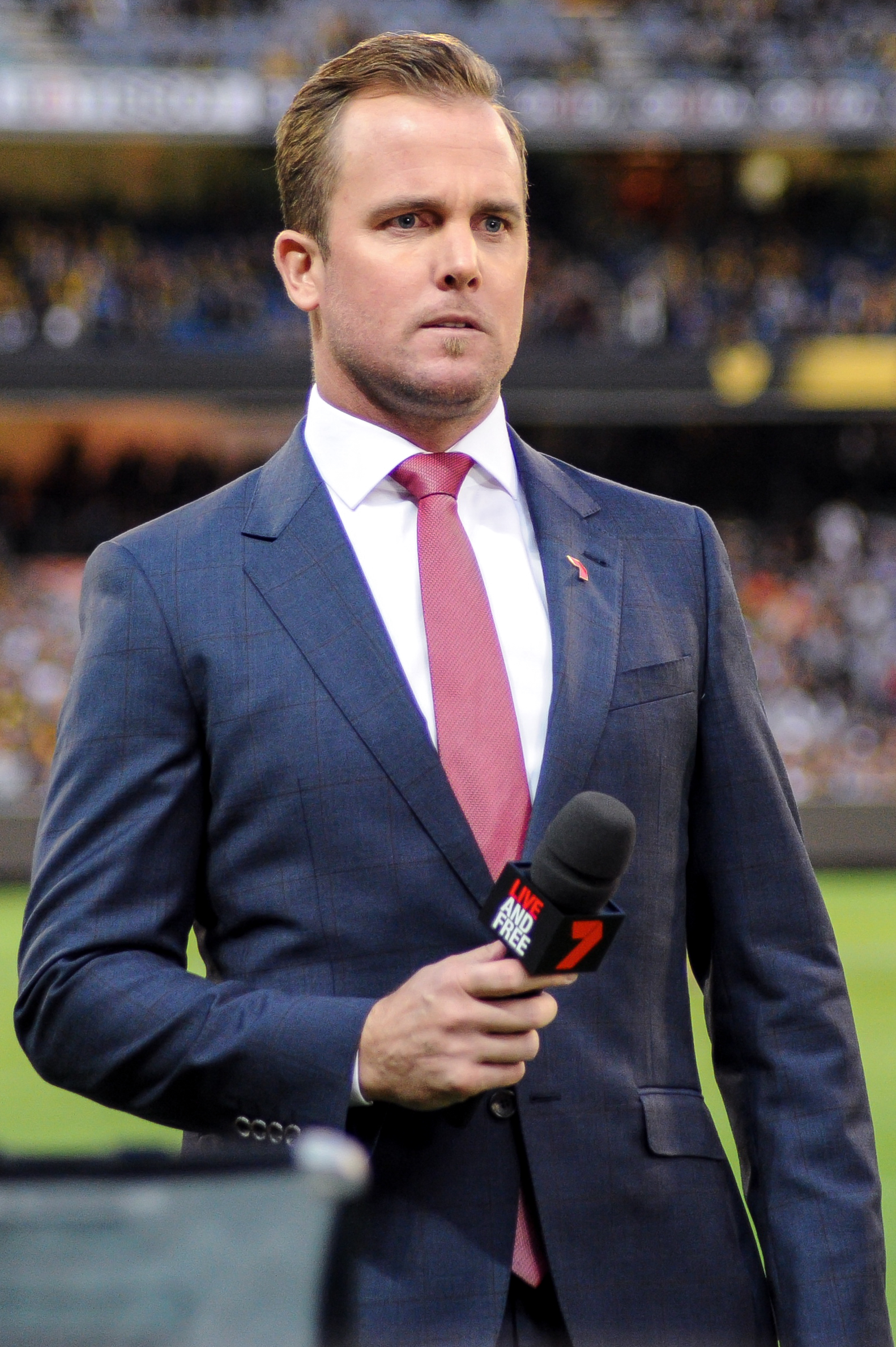
- Welsh with the Seven Network in March 2017

Personal information
- Full name: Andrew Welsh
- Born: 11 February 1983 (age 43); Melbourne, Australia
- Original team: Calder Cannons
- Height: 188 cm (6 ft 2 in)
- Weight: 87 kg (192 lb)
- Position: Midfielder/Defender

Playing career^{1}
Years	Club	Games (Goals)
2002–2011	Essendon	162 (32)
- ^{1} Playing statistics correct to the end of 2011.

Andrew Welsh (born 11 February 1983) is a former Australian rules footballer who played for the Essendon Football Club in the Australian Football League. He is the current president of the club.

He was selected by Essendon with the 47th selection in the 2001 AFL draft. He was a backline player who played halfback or back pocket for much of his career. However, later in his career he developed his game to play as tough, hard running midfielder.

His best individual season was in 2006 where he finished 5th in the club's Best & Fairest.

In October 2011, Welsh who was vice captain retired from Essendon Football Club due to several injury setbacks after playing 162 games with the club. The move was seen as quite selfless as he was only 28 years old at the time - "I didn’t want to be sitting on the sidelines taking up a spot on the list doing rehab. It was important to me to do the right thing by the club and give a young player a chance."

In 2013, he became a boundary rider for the Seven Network.

Welsh is now a property developer with a net worth believed to be over $400 million.

Welsh joined the Essendon Football Club board in 2022 and was promoted to vice president in 2023. In September 2025, Welsh was appointed as the President of the club.

A week after taking on the Presidency, Welsh spoke at the 2025 Crichton Medal promising to galvanize the club into a new era - "We win together, we lose together. But we stick together – and when we stick together, we're a formidable club. All in, all heart."

== Statistics ==
Statistics are correct as of Round 22, 2011 (1 October 2011)

Season	Team	No.	Games	Goals	Behinds	Kicks	Marks	Handballs	Disp. Av
2002	Essendon	41	15	1	3	113	47	38	10.1
2003	Essendon	12	22	4	1	218	93	123	15.5
2004	Essendon	12	22	1	1	244	96	115	16.3
2005	Essendon	12	21	2	2	235	121	141	17.9
2006	Essendon	12	20	1	3	226	130	163	19.4
2007	Essendon	12	17	9	5	180	101	108	16.9
2008	Essendon	12	17	9	0	165	70	129	17.3
2009	Essendon	12	11	2	4	100	42	126	20.5
2010	Essendon	12	11	1	4	77	35	108	16.8
2011	Essendon	12	6	2	0	15	11	33	8
Totals			162	32	23	1573	746	1084	16.4
