= Freedom Furniture =

Australian furniture store chain

Freedom
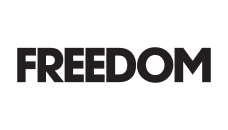
- Industry: Retail
- Founded: 1981; 45 years ago
- Number of locations: 59 stores, 47 in Australia and 12 in New Zealand (2026)
- Area served: Australia, New Zealand
- Products: Furniture; homewares; kitchens; sofas; rugs; lighting
- Number of employees: 1000+
- Parent: Amart Furniture
- Website: freedom.com.au freedom.co.nz

Freedom is a furniture and homewares retail chain in Australia and New Zealand.

== History ==
Freedom was founded in 1981 in Sydney by Warren Higgs. Its first Melbourne store opened in 1984. Freedom was purchased by investment company Jamison Equity in July 1991.

In 1996, Freedom went public on the Australian Securities Exchange. The same year, it expanded to New Zealand through local franchisee Farmers Deka.

In April 1999, Freedom acquired the Guests and Andersons furniture chains for $22.4 million in cash and stock. In 2000, it acquired bedding company Capt'n Snooze. In 2002, the company acquired the Bayswiss homewares chain.

In 2003, Freedom was bought out and taken private by management in a deal backed by Steinhoff International, the company's supplier and largest shareholder.

In 2004, Freedom entered the UK market through a management and supply agreement with Cargo Homeshop, a furniture and homewares with 36 stores at the time. The deal gave Freedom management control over the retailer, with the option to purchase it outright in the future. Freedom also planned to alter the retailer's product range and introduce Freedom products.

The New Zealand arm had 13 stores by 2008. and 15 stores by 2009. In 2023 Freedom saw the closure of two New Zealand stores; Palmerston North and Taupō. This left 12 stores remaining around New Zealand, including five in Auckland.

In June 2025, Amart Furniture announced it would acquire Freedom.

== See also ==
- Fantastic Furniture
