= 1893 VFA season =

17th season of the Victorian Football Association

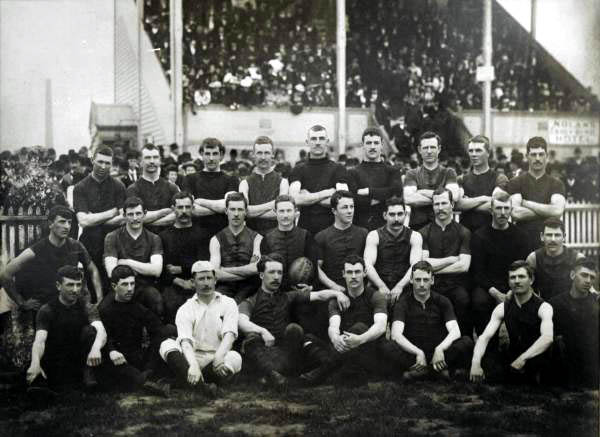
- Essendon – 1893 VFA premiers

Overview
- Teams: 13
- Premiers: Essendon; 3rd premiership

The 1893 VFA season was the 17th season of the Victorian Football Association (VFA), the highest-level senior Australian rules football competition in Victoria.

The premiership was won by the Essendon Football Club, which was unbeaten during the season; Essendon finished with a record of 18 wins and 2 draws from 20 matches. It was also Essendon's third consecutive premiership out of a sequence of four consecutive premierships won from 1891 to 1894.

== Association membership ==
The playing membership of the Association was unchanged from 1892. On the administrative side, the representation of the three Ballarat-based clubs – Ballarat, Ballarat Imperial and South Ballarat – was diminished, with each club now represented by only one delegate on the Board of Management instead of the two delegates to which each other club was entitled. Efforts to reduce Ballarat representation had been occurring since as early as 1891, as Ballarat's control of almost 20% of Association delegates was seen to give excessive voting power to a city which played fewer games than and did not compete in the premiership with the metropolitan teams. The Ballarat-based clubs remained affiliated to the Association with lesser representation, but also started up their own body, the Ballarat Football Association, this same year.

== Ladder ==
Teams did not play a uniform number of premiership matches during the season. As such, in the final standings, each team's premiership points were adjusted upwards proportionally to represent a 21-match season – e.g., Essendon played 20 matches, so its tally of premiership points was increased by a factor of 21/20. After this adjustment, there was no formal process for breaking a tie.

1893 VFA ladder
| Pos | Team | Pld | W | L | D | GF | GA | Pts | Adj pts |
|---|---|---|---|---|---|---|---|---|---|
| 1 | Essendon (P) | 20 | 18 | 0 | 2 | 146 | 64 | 76 | 79.80 |
| 2 | Melbourne | 21 | 16 | 3 | 2 | 118 | 62 | 68 | 68.00 |
| 3 | Geelong | 20 | 14 | 4 | 2 | 106 | 85 | 60 | 63.00 |
| 4 | South Melbourne | 21 | 13 | 4 | 4 | 133 | 90 | 60 | 60.00 |
| 5 | Fitzroy | 21 | 11 | 8 | 2 | 114 | 84 | 48 | 48.00 |
| 6 | Port Melbourne | 20 | 8 | 9 | 3 | 75 | 81 | 38 | 39.90 |
| 6 | St Kilda | 20 | 9 | 10 | 1 | 79 | 98 | 38 | 39.90 |
| 8 | Footscray | 20 | 9 | 11 | 0 | 73 | 75 | 36 | 37.80 |
| 9 | Collingwood | 19 | 7 | 10 | 2 | 64 | 68 | 32 | 35.37 |
| 10 | Williamstown | 20 | 4 | 13 | 3 | 77 | 96 | 22 | 23.10 |
| 11 | Carlton | 20 | 4 | 15 | 1 | 71 | 136 | 18 | 18.90 |
| 12 | Richmond | 20 | 2 | 14 | 4 | 83 | 131 | 16 | 16.80 |
| 13 | North Melbourne | 20 | 3 | 17 | 0 | 47 | 116 | 12 | 12.60 |

(P) Premiers

== Notable events ==
- In Round 22, Essendon's Albert Thurgood set two goalkicking records in his team's win against Richmond: he kicked twelve of Essendon's fourteen goals for the match, to set a new record for most goals by one player in a match in Victoria, and his twelve goals took him to a new record of 64 goals in a season, breaking his own record of 56 goals set the previous year: both records would stand until 1915 and 1919. Thurgood was also the Association's leading goalkicker for the season, finishing ahead of Fitzroy's Jim Grace (49 goals).
- The Stars and Stripes Trophy, a prize of five gold watches sponsored by the Stars and Stripes Cigarette Company, was presented at the end of the season to reward accurate goal-kicking, and was to be awarded to the club which scored the highest ratio of goals to behinds during the season. Melbourne won the trophy, scoring 0.791 goals per behind, while Williamstown was second with 0.770 goals per behind, and Fitzroy was third with 0.735 goals per behind. The Association average was 0.655.
- On 7 October, one week after the close of the premiership season, Essendon hosted South Adelaide, the premiers of the South Australian Football Association, in a challenge match at Victoria Park in Melbourne. Essendon won the match by the score of 10.23 to 3.6.
