= 1892 VFA season =

16th season of the Victorian Football Association

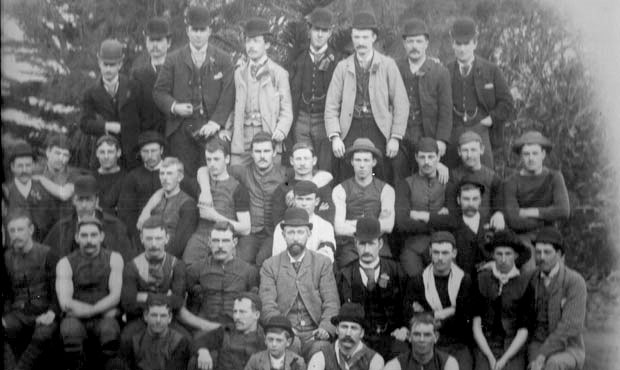
- Essendon – 1892 VFA premiers

Overview
- Teams: 13
- Premiers: Essendon; 2nd premiership

The 1892 VFA season was the 16th season of the Victorian Football Association (VFA), the highest-level senior Australian rules football competition in Victoria.

The premiership was won by the Essendon Football Club, which finished with a record of 15 wins, 1 draw and 3 losses from 19 matches. It was Essendon's second consecutive premiership, out of a sequence of four consecutive premierships won from 1891 to 1894.

== Association membership ==
The size of the Association premiership increased to thirteen senior clubs in 1892, with the newly established Collingwood Football Club competing for the first time. The club was formed from the Britannia Football Club, which had been a leading junior club in the Collingwood area since the establishment of the VFA in 1877, and had applied to enter the VFA since 1889.

== Ladder ==
Teams did not play a uniform number of premiership matches during the season. As such, in the final standings, each team's premiership points were adjusted upwards proportionally to represent a 21-match season – e.g., Essendon played 19 matches, so its tally of premiership points was increased by a factor of 21/19. After this adjustment, there was no formal process for breaking a tie.

1892 VFA ladder
Pos	Team	Pld	W	L	D	GF	GA	Pts	Adj pts
1	Essendon (P)	19	15	1	3	131	53	66	72.95
2	Fitzroy	21	15	4	2	141	63	64	64.00
3	Geelong	18	12	4	2	113	71	52	60.67
4	Melbourne	18	10	5	3	103	79	46	53.67
5	Carlton	20	12	7	1	83	71	50	52.50
6	South Melbourne	21	9	8	4	91	85	44	44.00
7	Port Melbourne	20	9	10	1	76	77	38	39.90
8	Richmond	19	8	10	1	87	104	34	37.58
9	St Kilda	18	7	9	2	89	84	32	37.33
10	Footscray	20	6	13	1	59	107	26	27.30
11	North Melbourne	20	4	14	2	55	114	20	21.00
12	Collingwood	18	3	14	1	48	105	14	16.33
12	Williamstown	18	3	14	1	50	113	14	16.33

(P) Premiers

== Notable events ==
- Essendon's Albert Thurgood was leading goalkicker in premiership matches for the season, kicking 56 goals. He finished ahead of Fitzroy's Jim Grace (48 goals), Melbourne's Harry Graham (42 goals) and Port Melbourne's Bill Fraser (40 goals). Thurgood sealed the leading goalkicker title by kicking nine of Essendon's ten goals in the final round match against North Melbourne (Grace kicked three goals on the same day), and broke the season record of Phil McShane, who kicked 51 goals for Geelong in 1886.

== See also ==
- Victorian Football Association/Victorian Football League History (1877-2008)
- List of VFA/VFL Premiers (1877-2007)
- History of Australian rules football in Victoria (1853-1900)
