= Fred Baring =

Australian rules footballer

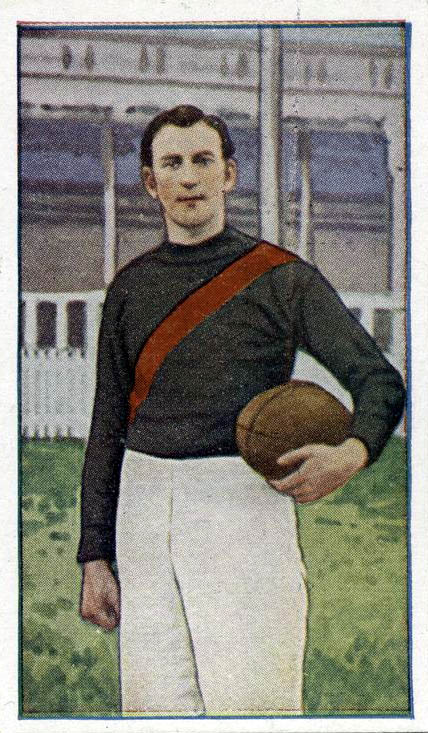

Personal information
- Full name: Frederick Albert Baring
- Born: 15 December 1890; Hotham East, Victoria
- Died: 10 December 1961 (aged 70); Doncaster, Victoria
- Original team: East Melbourne
- Height: 185 cm (6 ft 1 in)
- Weight: 90 kg (198 lb)

Playing career^{1}
Years	Club	Games (Goals)
1910–1924	Essendon	154 (92)
- ^{1} Playing statistics correct to the end of 1924.

Fred Baring
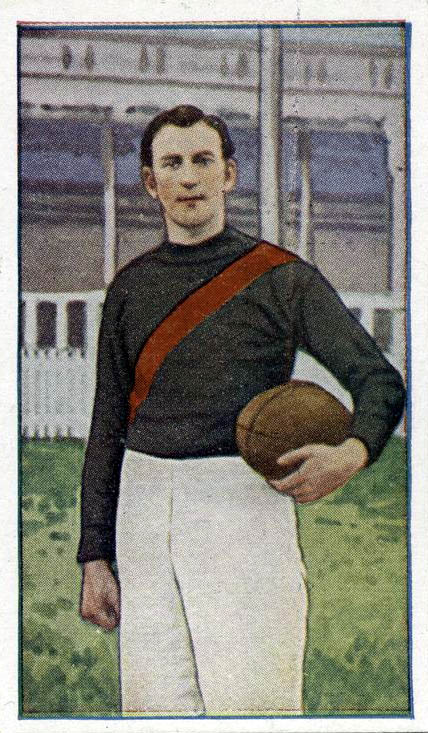

Cricket information
- Batting: Right-handed
- Bowling: Right-arm off-spin

Domestic team information
- Years: Team
- 1911/12–1928/29: Victoria

Career statistics
Competition	First-class
Matches	30
Runs scored	1846
Batting average	32.96
100s/50s	2/11
Top score	131
Balls bowled	538
Wickets	5
Bowling average	57.00
5 wickets in innings	0
10 wickets in match	0
Best bowling	2/23
Catches/stumpings	21/–
- Source: Cricinfo, 14 August 2022

Frederick Albert Baring (15 December 1890 – 10 December 1961) was an Australian rules footballer who played with Essendon in the Victorian Football League (VFL) during the early 1900s. In 1997 he was named at fullback in Essendon's official Team of the Century. He also played first-class cricket for Victoria.

== Family ==
The son of Frederick John Baring (1857–1917), and Annie Baring (−1935), née Riley, Frederick Albert Baring was born in North Melbourne (then known as "East Hotham") on 15 December 1890.

He married Minnie Sybil Horne (−1940) in 1916, and Edith Lillian Ackary in February 1944.

== Football ==
A four-times premiership player with Essendon (1911, 1912, 1923, 1924), Baring started his career as a ruckman and ended it as a fullback.

He kicked the winning goal in the 1912 Grand Final and captained Essendon for eight matches in the 1918 VFL season.

In 1913 he won the Essendon Best and Fairest award. He was a VFL interstate representative at the 1911 Adelaide Carnival. During his career Baring played under the pseudonym "Adamson", when he was unable to get approved leave to play in the VFL from his employer.

== Cricket ==
Baring was also a successful cricketer and played Sheffield Shield matches for Victoria. A right-handed batsman, he managed a total of 30 first-class matches between 1911–12 and 1928–29, scoring 1846 runs at 32.96.

Following the death of Victor Trumper, Baring was recognised, as the best batsman in Australia on poor pitches. He made his highest score of 131 opening the batting for Victoria against New South Wales in December 1918.

He was on the verge of playing Test cricket for Australia after being selected for their squad to tour South Africa in 1914–15; however, the series was canceled due to World War I.

== Death ==
Baring died in the Melbourne suburb of Doncaster on 10 December 1961.

== Champions of Essendon ==
In 2002, an Essendon panel ranked Baring at 24 in their Champions of Essendon list of the 25 greatest players ever to have played for Essendon.

== See also ==
- List of Victoria first-class cricketers
