= Cameron Joyce (coach) =

Australian rules football coach (born 1980)

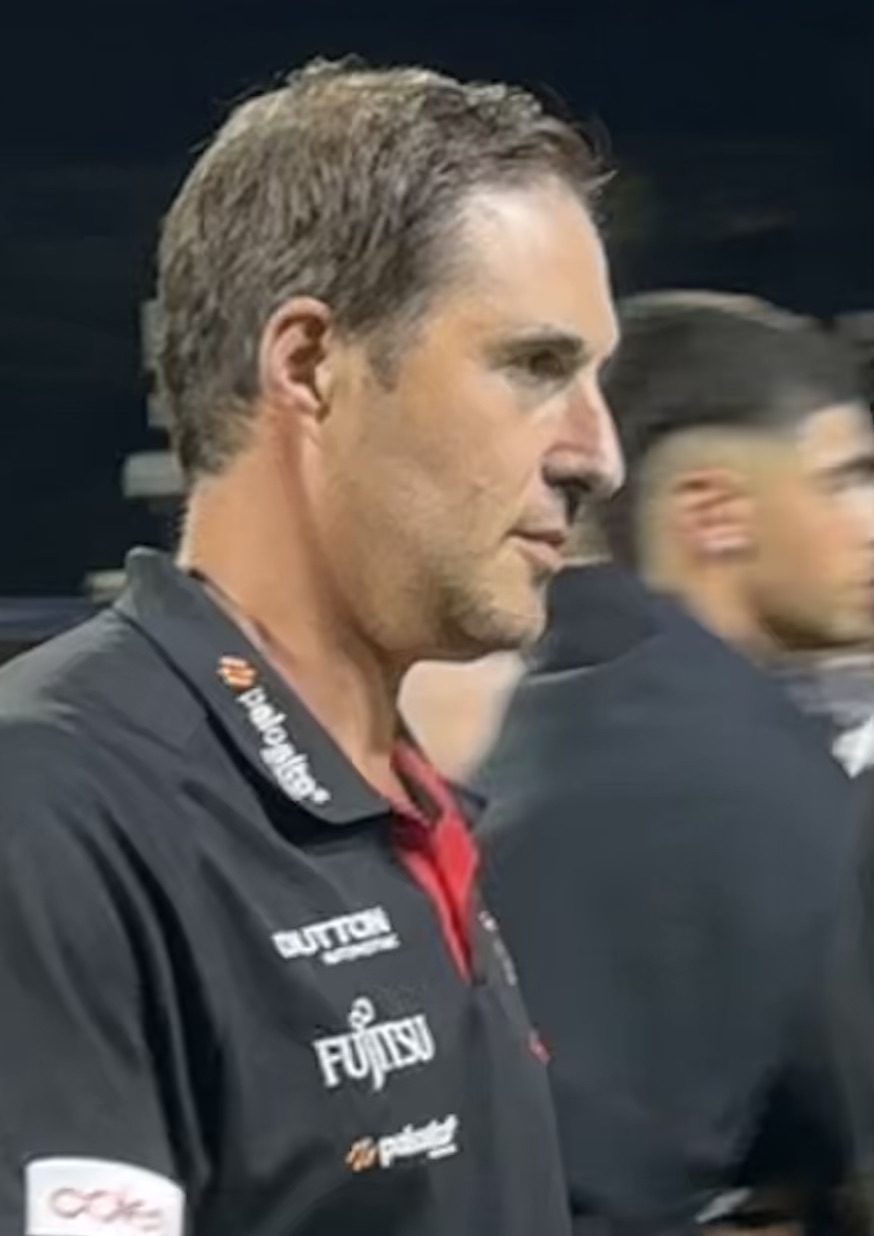
- Joyce in April 2025

Personal information
- Full name: Cameron Joyce
- Born: 1980 (age 45–46); Perth, Western Australia

Coaching career^{3}
Years	Club	Games (W–L–D)
2022 (S6)–2024	Gold Coast (AFLW)	42 (15–24–3)
2025–	Essendon (VFL)	37 (16–21–0)
- ^{3} Coaching statistics correct as of the 2024 season.

Cameron Joyce (born 1980) is an Australian rules football coach who currently serves as the head coach of Essendon in the Victorian Football League (VFL). He previously coached the Gold Coast Suns in the AFL Women's (AFLW) from 2022 season 6 until he was dismissed at the end of the 2024 season.

== Early life and administrative career ==
Joyce was born in Perth, Western Australia in 1980. His father, Alan, was a professional Australian rules footballer who played for Hawthorn in the 1960s and coached the Hawks to a pair of VFL/AFL premierships in 1988 and 1991. Joyce moved with his family to Melbourne at a young age when his father decided to pursue VFL coaching opportunities, which also included a stint as the head coach of the Western Bulldogs.

Joyce played junior football for Glen Iris as well as Oakleigh and although he was invited to train with Hawthorn during their 1998 pre-season, he was not selected by the Hawks. Following high school graduation, Joyce turned his attention to an off-field role when Richmond handed him a video analysis position at the club, and he was promoted to a football administration assistant role the following year. Joyce accepted similar roles with North Melbourne and West Coast in the following years before being given his big break in 2008 when he was appointed the list manager of North Melbourne. Joyce was appointed the General Manager of Football at North Melbourne in 2016 and held that position for three years.

== Coaching career ==
Following his administrative career, Joyce accepted a coaching and development role with AFL Tasmania in October 2019.

=== AFL Women's ===
Joyce was appointed the head coach of the Gold Coast Suns women's team on 2 June 2021. He became the first Gold Coast coach to secure back-to-back AFLW wins when his team defeated West Coast and Richmond in rounds 2 and 3 of his first season as head coach. He coached the Suns to their highest ever end of season position of fifth as well as their second ever finals appearance in 2023.

After the Suns finished 17th in 2024, Joyce was sacked as coach.
