= 1894 VFA season =

1894 premiership season
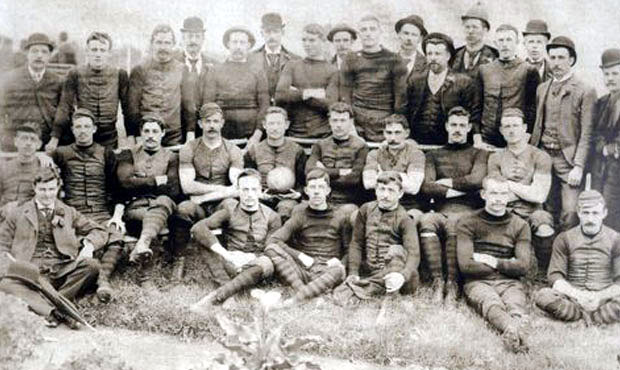
- Essendon FC team
- Teams: 13
- Premiers: Essendon; 4th premiership

The 1894 Victorian Football Association season was the 18th season of the Australian rules football competition. The premiership was won by the Essendon Football Club by a margin of fourteen points, finishing with a record of 16 wins, 1 draw and 1 loss from 18 matches. It was Essendon's fourth consecutive premiership.

== Ladder ==
For the first time, fixtures were standardised under the control of a central committee, with all teams playing 18 premiership matches (i.e. playing half of the other 12 clubs twice and the other half once): thus, the 1888-1893 proportional points system was no longer required.

Prior to 1894, teams had played differing numbers of matches, meaning their final records would be adjusted to allow them to be ranked on an equivalent basis.

1894 VFA ladder
Pos	Team	Pld	W	L	D	GF	GA	Pts
1	Essendon (P)	18	16	1	1	150	70	66
2	Melbourne	18	13	5	0	97	72	52
3	South Melbourne	18	11	5	2	106	74	48
4	Fitzroy	18	10	6	2	75	60	44
4	Footscray	18	9	5	4	78	66	44
4	North Melbourne	18	8	4	6	72	67	44
7	Geelong	18	9	7	2	99	80	40
8	Collingwood	18	8	9	1	69	74	34
9	Port Melbourne	18	7	10	1	70	78	30
10	Williamstown	18	5	10	3	80	94	26
11	Richmond	18	4	13	1	77	125	18
12	St Kilda	18	3	14	1	59	119	14
13	Carlton	18	2	16	0	55	108	8

(P) Premiers

== Notable events ==
- Essendon's Albert Thurgood was the dominant goalkicker for the season, kicking 63 goals. His nearest rival, A. Burns of South Melbourne, kicked only 31 goals.
- St Kilda's win over Port Melbourne in Round 6 was its last away win in either the VFA or the VFL until beating South Melbourne in Round 3 of 1903; in that time, St Kilda played a total of 77 away matches for three draws and 74 losses, including 62 consecutive away losses from 1896 to 1903.
- Essendon's loss to Geelong in Round 19 ended an unbeaten streak of 47 matches.

== See also ==
- Victorian Football Association/Victorian Football League History (1877–2008)
- List of VFA/VFL Premiers (1877–2007)
- History of Australian rules football in Victoria (1853-1900)
