= Toyota Material Handling =

American distributor of Toyota equipment

Toyota Material Handling, Inc.
- Formerly: Toyota Material Handling, U.S.A., Inc.; Toyota Industrial Equipment Manufacturing
- Company type: Public
- Industry: Material handling
- Founded: 1967
- Headquarters: Columbus, Indiana,, U.S.
- Area served: North America
- Key people: Brett Wood, President & CEO
- Products: forklifts, Lift trucks, tow tractors, Aerial work platforms, Automated Guided Vehicles
- Number of employees: 2000
- Website: toyotaforklift.com

Toyota Material Handling, Inc. (TMH), also referred to as Toyota Forklift, is an American manufacturer and distributor of forklifts and tow tractors that is based in Columbus, Indiana. TMHU also is the sole United States distributor for Aichi aerial work platforms, which include scissor lifts, crawler and wheeled boom lifts. TMHU is a subsidiary of Toyota Industries Corporation. Toyota has been the number one lift truck supplier in North America since 2002.

Although its origins date back to 1967, the company was officially formed in January 2020 after the integration of two related business units: Toyota Material Handling, U.S.A., Inc. and Toyota Industrial Equipment Manufacturing. It is a subsidiary of Toyota Material Handling North America which is itself a subsidiary of the Toyota Industries Corporation.

== History ==
The Toyota Motor Corporation introduced its first lift truck (the Model LA) in Japan in 1956 and followed that with its first tow tractor in 1957. In 1967, Toyota sold its first forklift in the United States and established its initial dealership there. All forklift operations in the U.S. were part of the Industrial Equipment Division of Toyota Motor Sales, U.S.A., Inc. A separate business unit (Toyota Industrial Trucks, U.S.A., Inc.) was formed out of the Industrial Equipment Division in 1975 and was based in Carson, California.

In 1988, Toyota announced a new manufacturing subsidiary called Toyota Industrial Equipment Manufacturing (TIEM) that would be based in Columbus, Indiana. Toyoda Automatic Loom Works (now Toyota Industries) possessed an 80% stake in the new venture while the Toyota Motor Corporation owned 20%. The 280,000 square-foot TIEM manufacturing facility in Columbus was completed in 1990 at a cost of $40 million, and forklift production began in May of that year.

In June 1996, the plant produced its 50,000th forklift, and it completed its 100,000th forklift three years later.

In 2002, Toyota Material Handling, U.S.A., Inc. (TMHU)—the North American industrial equipment sales and distribution arm of Toyota—was established in Irvine, California. The same year, it became the number one selling lift truck company in America. In 2003, a new 3-wheel, AC-electric forklift (the 7FBEU) was introduced at the TIEM plant in Columbus. It was the first new forklift to be launched at that location by Toyota, which had previously launched new equipment from its Japanese facilities. In 2004, the Columbus plant produced its 200,000th forklift,

In 2008, the Columbus manufacturing facility began producing tow tractors, and TMHU became the sole North American distributor of Aichi aerial work platforms, including scissor lifts and wheeled- and crawler-boom lifts. In 2012, TMHU announced that it would move its headquarters from Irvine, California to Columbus, Indiana, bringing it to the same campus as the TIEM manufacturing facility and headquarters.

In 2013, TIEM unveiled an updated version of the 8-series forklift. It was the first time a new Toyota forklift model had been built at the Columbus facility first rather than at a Japanese plant.

In 2019, it was announced that TIEM and TMHU would be integrating into a single business unit called Toyota Material Handling, Inc. (TMH) with Jeff Rufener as President and CEO. The integration process was completed in January 2020. TMH is a direct subsidiary of Toyota Materials Handling North America, which is part of the Toyota Industries Corporation.

By 2021, it sold its 750,000th forklift

== Products and operation ==
Toyota Material Handling (TMH) manufactures, distributes, and sells material handling vehicles and industrial equipment. It is known for its lines of forklifts, which are often manufactured on-site at the Columbus, Indiana facility. Types of forklifts include three- and four-wheel electric forklifts, internal combustion forklifts, and forklifts powered by compressed natural gas. TMH also manufactures pallet jacks, tow tractors, order pickers, container handlers, automated guided vehicles, and reach trucks. It is the sole North American distributor of Aichi aerial work platforms, including scissor lifts and wheeled- and crawler-boom lifts.

TMH products are sold through the Toyota Dealer Network, which includes more than 200 independent dealerships throughout the U.S. and Canada.
