= Amart Furniture =

Australian furniture retailer

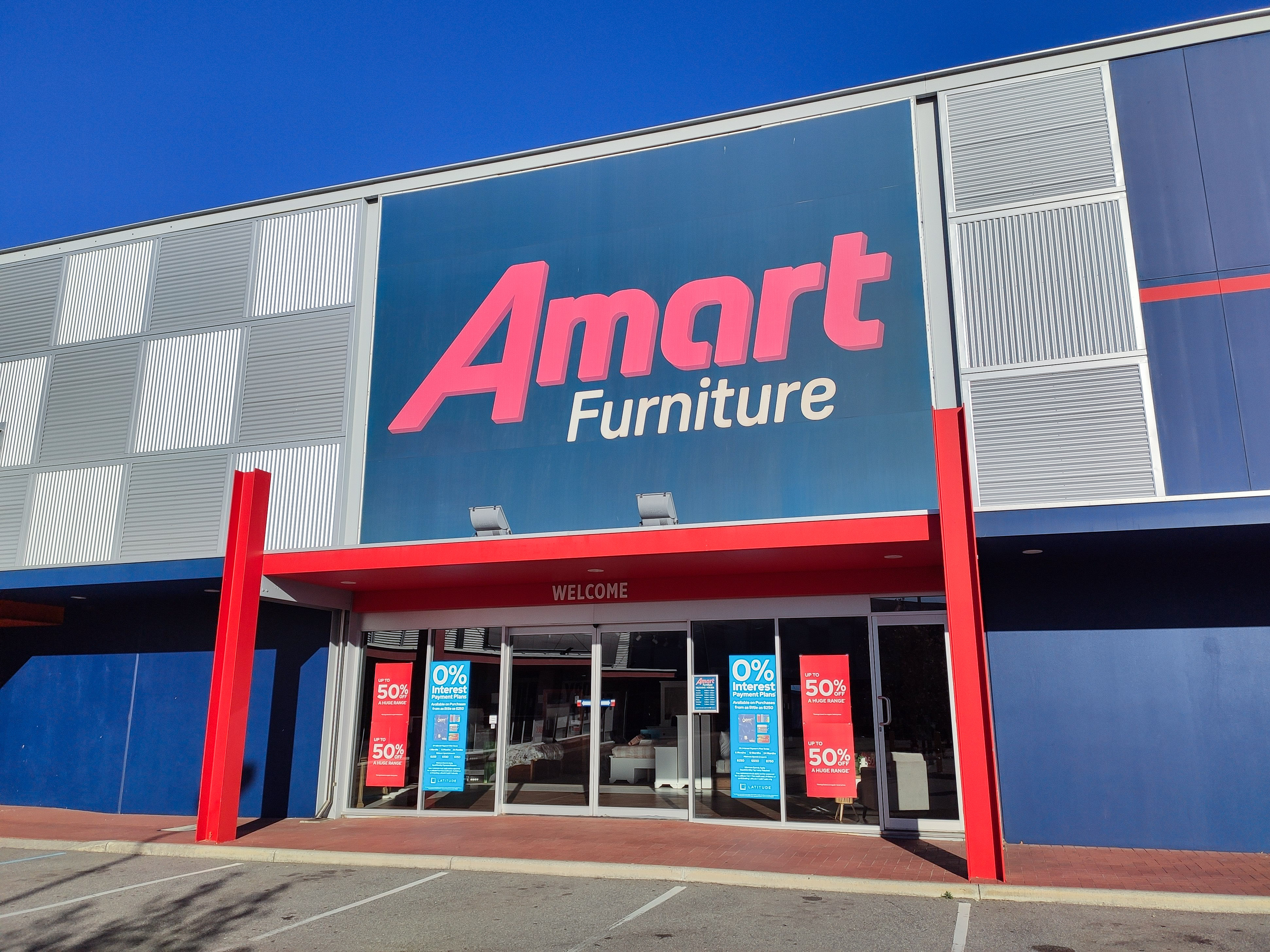
- Amart Furniture store in Beckenham
- Formerly: Super Amart
- Industry: Manufacturing and retailing
- Founded: 1970; 56 years ago in Brisbane, Australia
- Founder: John van Lieshout
- Headquarters: Rochedale, Brisbane, Australia
- Number of locations: 65 stores (2026)
- Area served: Australia
- Products: Household furniture
- Number of employees: 1,000+ (2019)
- Parent: Quadrant Private Equity
- Website: amartfurniture.com.au

Amart Furniture (previously known as Super Amart) is an Australian founded furniture retailer with 68 stores Australia-wide. Amart was founded by John van Lieshout in 1970 in Brisbane, Queensland. Amart is currently majority owned by Australian private equity firm Quadrant Private Equity since 2016.

== History ==
=== Original ownership (1970-2006) ===
The company's first retail store was opened in MacGregor, Brisbane in 1970.

=== Ironbridge Capital (2006-2016) ===
In 2006, John van Lieshout sold Super Amart to Ironbridge Capital for A$500 million.

The current CEO of Amart Furniture is Lee Chadwick, who took the position in 2014.

=== Quadrant Private Equity (Since 2016) ===
Quadrant Private Equity gained ownership of the retailer in 2016 in a deal valued at around A$400 million. Amart Furniture previously had its head office in Springwood, Brisbane before moving to a new head office in Rochedale Brisbane.

In June 2025, Amart announced it would acquire the Freedom business.

== Operations ==
=== Current store formats ===
==== Amart Furniture ====
Amart Furniture has 67 stores in total, with 20 stores in Queensland, 20 stores in New South Wales, 13 stores in Victoria, 8 stores in Western Australia, 3 stores in South Australia,1 store in Tasmania, 1 store in the ACT and 1 store in Northern Territory.

=== Defunct store formats ===
==== Super Amart ====
In 2017, Super Amart rebranded to Amart Furniture. which changed the company's name, logo and tag-line.

== Sponsorship ==
Amart Furniture are major sponsors of Ronald McDonald House charity and were a major sponsor of Essendon Football Club from 2019 to 2023.

== See also ==
- Amart Sports
- Freedom Furniture
