= True Value Solar =

- Company type: Private
- Industry: Renewable Energy
- Founded: March 2009
- Defunct: 2018
- Headquarters: Melbourne, Victoria, Australia
- Key people: David McCallum (Managing Director)
- Products: Solar Systems
- Net income: ▲ A$43.3 million (2011)
- Number of employees: < 30
- Website: truevaluesolar.com.au

True Value Solar was an Australian solar systems sales company, which was founded in 2009 and ceased operations in late 2018. In 2011 German-based M+W Group bought a majority stake in True Value, and bought True Value's remaining 35 per cent of shares in 2013.

The core business of the company was as a sales company of rooftop solar power systems, with installation and perhaps responsibility for issues by contractors. It operated in all major states in Australia except for the Northern Territory and Australian Capital Territory, although it had no office in Tasmania.

== ACCC issues ==
On 11 April 2016, the Australian Competition & Consumer Commission (ACCC) reported that True Value Solar ceased offering its customers incentives for publishing positive online reviews, following an investigation. On 4 November 2011, the ACCC reported that True Value Solar paid two infringement notices totalling $13,200 and provided a court enforceable undertaking regarding misleading advertising.

== Purchase by M+W Group ==
In March 2013, True Value Solar became fully owned by German-based M+W Group, after the engineering and construction firm bought True Value's remaining 35 per cent shareholding. M+W was already the majority shareholder in the rooftop solar specialist, having bought 65 per cent of the company in 2011.

In March 2011 German engineering firm M+W Group announced that it had purchased a majority stake in National Solar Group, the parent company of True Value Solar at the time.

== Executive members ==
- David McCallum, Managing Director

== Market presence ==
The rooftop solar industry in Australia is one of the biggest in the world. With over 1 million residential systems installed throughout the country, the solar sales market is one of the most competitive.

The top ten solar system sales companies in Australia as of April 2017 according to Green Energy Markets include Euro Solar in number one place with around 6.5% of all sales, Powerark (wholesaler/distributor), SolarGain, Origin Energy, AGL Energy, with True Value Solar dropping to tenth place with only around 1% of sales.
