= North Geelong Football Club =

North Geelong

Names
- Full name: North Geelong Football Club Inc
- Nickname: Magpies

Club details
- Founded: 1876; 150 years ago
- Colours: Black White
- Competition: Geelong District FL
- Premierships: 18
- Ground: Osborne Park

Uniforms
Home

Other information
- Official website: northgeelongfnc.net.au

The North Geelong Football Netball Club is an Australian rules football and netball club located in Geelong.

== History ==
The club was established in 1876, and is currently in the Geelong & District Football League. The club's colours are black and white, with a magpie as their logo. Their home shorts are black with black socks. They have won a total of 18 senior premierships, 11 reserves premierships and 7 U18s premierships. Their home ground is Osborne Park in Swinbourne Street, North Geelong.

The club dominated the league in the 1950s, winning seven premierships in a row and eight premierships in ten years between 1949–1958. In 1959, the club considered joining the Victorian Football Association, which was expanding at the time, and the club approached the VFA to enquire about minimum home ground requirements and the like; but it never ultimately joined.

North Geelong also fielded a women's team in Division 1 of the Victorian Women's Football League (2015), before being elevated to the VFL Women's competition in 2016, playing as the Geelong Magpies. In 2017, after the Geelong Cats took the license for the VFLW team, North Geelong Women's team joined the AFL Goldfields Women's Football League, going through the 2017 season undefeated on the way to beating Redan in the Grand Final.

== Premierships ==
- Geelong & District Football League

Seniors — 1925, 1930, 1949, 1950, 1951, 1952, 1953, 1954, 1955, 1958, 1968, 1969, 1988, 1990, 1992, 1993, 2002, 2013,2025

Reserves — 1949, 1955, 1956, 1957, 1958, 1959, 1963, 1988, 1996, 1997, 2002, 2013, 2014, 2015, 2016

Under 18's — 1939, 1944, 1949, 1952, 1996, 1997, 2005, 2006, 2009, 2010, 2011, 2014

- AFL Goldfields Women's

Seniors — 2017

- AFL Barwon Women's Football

Division 1 — 2018
Division 2 — 2019

== VFL/AFL players ==
- Tom Arklay
- Max Atkin
- Lionel Barclay
- Andrew Bews
- Leo Dean
- Marc Dragicevic
- Billy Gallagher
- Bill Goggin
- Ken Hands
- Gordon Hynes
- Doug Jerram
- Kevin Kirkpatrick
- Harold Manson
- Dale Mather
- Tom Morrow
- Jack Mullane
- Angie Muller
- Jack Muller
- Nick Muller
- Don O'Hara
- Alex Perry
- Ray Sarcevic
- Wally Southern
- Jack Stevens
- Vic Taylor
- Neil Tompkins
- Len Vautier
- Rod West

== Bibliography ==
- Cat Country: History of Football In The Geelong Region by John Stoward – ISBN 978-0-9577515-8-3
