= 2026 Geelong Football Club season =

The 2026 Geelong Football Club season was the club's 162nd season playing Australian rules football, with the club competing in their 127th season in the Australian Football League (AFL) and their ninth season in the AFL Women's (AFLW) competition. The club continued to field and men's and women's reserves teams in the Victorian Football League (VFL) and the VFL Women's (VFLW) respectively.

== Club news ==
Club captain Patrick Dangerfield, as well as Jeremy Cameron, Bailey Smith and Max Holmes were chosen to represent Victoria in the return of State of Origin. Cameron would be forced to withdraw from the squad due to injury. Lawson Humphries was selected to represent Western Australia in the match, while Geelong coach Chris Scott was asked to coach the Victoria squad.

At the Australian Football Hall of Fame dinner in June, former dual premiership player Gary Ablett Jr., and player from the 1970s Tim Evans were both inducted into the Hall of Fame.

In July, the club honoured Gary Ablett Jr. by elevating him as the 29th legend in the club's Hall of Fame. Also recognised were 2007 and 2009 premiership coach Mark Thompson and former captain Joel Selwood who were both inducted into the Hall of Fame. Receiving life membership were current players Max Holmes, Jeremy Cameron, Brad Close, and Zach Guthrie. Women's players Julia Crockett-Grills, Nina Morrison, Georgie Rankin, Amy McDonald, Rebecca Webster, and recently retired players Meg McDonald and Maddy McMahon were also afforded life membership status. Former players Larry Donohue, Liam Pickering, and John Mossop we also granted life membership, with recruiter and talent scout Col Watts.

For the sixth successive year, the club broke their membership record, eclipsing last year's record of 92,379 members, reporting a total of 92,563 in August 2026.

Lani Cockrem was added to the club's board of directors in October, having previously served on the board of the Geelong Cats Foundation.

=== Concussion waiver controversy ===
In early August, it was revealed by News Corporation journalist Jay Clark in the Herald Sun that since 2024 an AFL club had a "secret deal requiring a player who has suffered multiple concussions to assume all legal responsibility for any further on-field brain trauma." The "disclosure agreement" was signed by the player who was initially not named by the media. Following the initial reports, the AFL and Geelong released a statement confirming that "the waiver one of its players signed after being cleared by the AFL's Concussion Panel 'went further than was intended'." The AFL and the AFL Players Association (AFLPA) also released a joint statement acknowledging that the waiver was not lodged or approved by the AFL or AFLPA and that it would be removed by Geelong.

The following day, club CEO Steve Hocking denied that the player was "coerced" into signing the document, stating:

it was an extensive process, it was conducted over a roughly two-month period. The player's representatives were involved, including family, legal representation as well, and that letter spelt out all of that entire process. It took time, it wasn’t rushed, as much as some people believe he may have been coerced into it. That is not the case. It was a thorough process, the care of the player and getting the player back to play was really important for the football club and for the player and his family

— Steve Hocking,

Hocking characterised Geelong's failure to correctly notify the AFL and AFLPA as a "misstep" and that Geelong would take full responsibility. Geelong was issued with a "please explain" letter from the AFL in relation to the controversy.

Immediately following Hocking's remarks, Jake Kolodjashnij ended speculation by confirming that he was the player at the centre of the controversy. Kolodjasnij quoted as saying that "I participated fully in the AFL’s independent concussion panel process, respected its independence, and was comfortable with the outcome. I have continued playing AFL football since. What disappoints me most is that my private medical information has been made public. Everyone deserves the right to keep their confidential medical information private."

Forced to remove the "waiver," which Geelong president Grant McCabe called a "voluntary assumption of risk," Kolodasnij was made "unavailable for selection" in both Geelong's AFL and VFL team for the final two weeks of the home and away season.

The AFL engaged independent legal counsel, James Peters KC and Ben Holding (two Victorian Barristers) to investigate the circumstances regarding the controversy.

During the investigation it was revealed that the AFL's Concussion Panel had reached an uncertain or "amber" finding in relation to Kolodjashnij's risk in continuing to play contact sport in November 2023, and that the Geelong board had adopted a recommendation that he agree to an "Acknowledgement of Risk" document. Geelong drafted the document based upon wording provided to them by representatives for Kolodjashnij. The final version of the letter was not seen by the Geelong board or lodged with the AFL or AFLPA after it was determined that it did not vary Kolodjashnij's playing contract.

Following that review, the AFL Commission found that Geelong had breached AFL Rules 4.3(a) and 28.3(c) in relation to the letter signed by Kolodjashnij. The review finding that the letter constituted a "variation to the standard playing contract and should have been lodged with the AFL and AFLPA." The report did not find that Geelong, its current or former directors or employees, or the AFL had engaged in inappropriate or improper conduct, or had intentionally sought to breach AFL Rules. The review finding that there was nothing wrong with clubs seeking to mitigate their legal exposure by negotiating with players, even with those with a history of concussion symptoms.

On 27 August, the AFL Commission fined Geelong A$140,000, imposing a fine of A$100,000 for their breaches in relation to this controversy, also imposing a previously suspended A$40,000 fine that was previously suspended from a 2025 sanction. The fines were to be paid into the AFLPA injury and support fund. AFL Chair Craig Dummond, who was president of the Geelong Football Club at the time when the letter was proposed and signed, apologised saying "the club went too far" and that "there was a process failure in relation to the lodgement of the agreement with the AFL and AFLPA." Drummond had been excluded from any AFL deliberation about the controversy.

Following the exposure of the waiver, Kolodjashnij was made unavailable for selection in either Geelong's AFL or VFL team. He would retire from football at the end of the season on medical grounds.

== AFL team ==
Geelong Football Club
2026 AFL season
- President: Grant McCabe
- Coach: Chris Scott (16th season)
- Captains: Patrick Dangerfield (4th season)
- Home ground: GMHBA Stadium
- AFL season: 15 wins, 8 losses (5th)
- Finals series: Lost semi final
- Best and Fairest: Bailey Smith
- Leading goalkicker: Shannon Neale (47)
- Highest home attendance: 83,166 vs Collingwood (Round 9)
- Lowest home attendance: 20,403 vs Adelaide (Round 3)
- Average home attendance: 32,218
- Club membership: 94,006

=== Season summary ===
It was the club's 16th AFL season under senior coach Chris Scott, with Patrick Dangerfield continuing as club captain.

In round six against the Western Bulldogs, forward Jeremy Cameron kicked ten goals to be the first Geelong player since 1994 to score ten goals in a match at Kardinia Park.

Midfielder Bailey Smith finished second in the Brownlow Medal count, polling a career-best 36 votes behind winner Nick Daicos. Smith earned votes in 14 matches including nine best-on-ground performances. Geelong finished the night with the third most votes among the clubs, with 13 players receiving 87 total votes. With his three votes, Patrick Dangerfield took his career tally to 262 votes, joining Gary Ablett Jr. with the most career Brownlow Medal votes.

=== Pre-season ===
Geelong started the season with a match simulation game against Hawthorn at the Kennedy Community Centre on 16 February, losing 14.10 (94) to 16.15 (117), with Shannon Neale kicking four goals.

Geelong played an official practice match as part of the AFL's Community Series against Carlton at Ikon Park on 25 February. Carlton led for most of the contest, defeating Geelong by 15 points with the Blues scoring 13.8 (86) to the Cats 11.5 (71). The match was Tanner Bruhn's first match since early in 2025 after he was unavailable during the entire 2025 premiership season.

=== Coaching staff ===
Chris Scott continued as the club's men's senior coach for a 16th season, having signed a contract extension in December 2025 until the end of the 2029 season.

2026 Geelong coaching staff
Role	Name
Senior coach	Chris Scott
Assistant coach	Nathan Buckley
Assistant coach	James Kelly
Assistant coach	James Rahilly
Head of player development	Nigel Lappin
Ruck coach	Brad Ottens
Development coach	Aaron Black
Development coach	Shaun Higgins

=== Playing list ===
==== Changes ====
Deletions from playing list
Player	Reason	Ref.
Mitch Duncan	Retired	
Patrick Retschko	Traded to Richmond	
Cameron Guthrie	Delisted	
Ted Clohesy	Delisted	
Xavier Ivisic	Delisted	

Additions to playing list
Player	Acquired	Ref.
James Worpel	Unrestricted free agent from Hawthorn	
Harley Barker	No. 24, 2025 national draft	
Hunter Holmes	No. 33, 2025 national draft	
Nick Driscoll	No. 28, 2026 rookie draft	
Jesse Mellor	Category B rookie	

==== Statistics ====
Updated to end of season

Key
^	Denotes player who was on the club's standard rookie list, and therefore eligible for senior selection.
#	Denotes Category B rookie where player needed to be elevated to club's senior list during this season to be eligible for senior selection.
‡	Competition leader in statistic category (Note: After home and away season)

Playing list and statistics
Player	No.	Games	Goals	Behinds	Kicks	Handballs	Disposals	Tackles	Marks	Hitouts	Milestone(s)
Tom Atkins	30	25	4	1	183	269	452	148	34	0	
Harley Barker	26	—N/a	—N/a	—N/a	—N/a	—N/a	—N/a	—N/a	—N/a	—N/a	
Jed Bews	24	—N/a	—N/a	—N/a	—N/a	—N/a	—N/a	—N/a	—N/a	—N/a	
Mark Blicavs	46	20	5	7	114	150	264	58	52	208	300th match (round 6)
Jack Bowes	12	9	7	6	91	67	158	22	33	0	150th AFL match (round 13)
Tanner Bruhn	4	23	1	6	296	198	494	68	107	0	
Cillian Burke#	41	—N/a	—N/a	—N/a	—N/a	—N/a	—N/a	—N/a	—N/a	—N/a	
Jeremy Cameron	5	19	41	29	211	61	272	20	113	1	
Jhye Clark	13	9	3	3	76	71	147	24	40	0	
Brad Close	45	18	11	12	87	104	191	42	38	0	
Toby Conway	6	—N/a	—N/a	—N/a	—N/a	—N/a	—N/a	—N/a	—N/a	—N/a	
Patrick Dangerfield	35	19	30	16	157	127	284	34	66	0	
Sam De Koning	16	19	1	1	109	164	273	29	69	140	100th match (round 17)
Oliver Dempsey	28	25	30	16	248	248	496	50	131	0	
Nick Driscoll^	27	—N/a	—N/a	—N/a	—N/a	—N/a	—N/a	—N/a	—N/a	—N/a	
Mitchell Edwards	11	20	3	3	84	123	207	38	28	424	AFL debut (round 1)
Zach Guthrie	39	25	1	1	259	141	400	59	128	0	150th match (round 23)
Jack Henry	38	21	6	4	128	72	200	25	86	4	
Oliver Henry	36	24	48	23	172	102	274	47	83	0	100th AFL match (round 17)
Lennox Hofmann	23	—N/a	—N/a	—N/a	—N/a	—N/a	—N/a	—N/a	—N/a	—N/a	
Hunter Holmes	22	—N/a	—N/a	—N/a	—N/a	—N/a	—N/a	—N/a	—N/a	—N/a	
Max Holmes	9	20	5	5	323	236	559	55	92	0	
Lawson Humphries	17	24	5	3	349	138	487	50	135	0	50th match (round 15)
Mitch Knevitt	10	2	2	2	11	10	21	7	4	0	
Jake Kolodjashnij	8	11	1	0	76	55	131	10	44	0	200th match (round 6)
Shaun Mannagh	7	25	38	21	302	136	438	76	65	0	50th match (round 15)
Jack Martin	19	18	22	15	117	84	201	44	73	0	
Keighton Matofai-Forbes^	31	—N/a	—N/a	—N/a	—N/a	—N/a	—N/a	—N/a	—N/a	—N/a	
Jesse Mellor#	25	—N/a	—N/a	—N/a	—N/a	—N/a	—N/a	—N/a	—N/a	—N/a	
Gryan Miers	32	17	6	5	187	156	343	39	82	0	
Jacob Molier	20	—N/a	—N/a	—N/a	—N/a	—N/a	—N/a	—N/a	—N/a	—N/a	
Oisín Mullin	34	25	3	6	160	184	344	102	73	0	50th match (round 7)
Shannon Neale	33	25	52	26	161	100	261	64	108	112	50th match (round 5); 100th AFL goal (round 20)
Mark O'Connor	42	22	4	3	168	149	317	56	96	0	
Connor O'Sullivan	14	25	1	2	229	147	376	41	165	1	50th match (Elimination final)
Joe Pike^	37	—N/a	—N/a	—N/a	—N/a	—N/a	—N/a	—N/a	—N/a	—N/a	
Jay Polkinghorne	2	8	14	8	42	20	62	9	31	0	AFL debut (round 19)
Bailey Smith	3	24	11	6	476‡	298	774	117	96	0	150th AFL match (Semi final)
Rhys Stanley	1	1	0	0	8	9	17	3	3	17	
Tyson Stengle	18	—N/a	—N/a	—N/a	—N/a	—N/a	—N/a	—N/a	—N/a	—N/a	
George Stevens^	15	2	1	0	11	18	29	6	5	0	
Tom Stewart	44	23	2	1	342	134	476	32	129	0	200th match (round 9)
Oliver Wiltshire	21	16	14	10	99	82	181	26	27	0	
James Worpel	29	11	4	3	119	83	202	69	29	0	Club debut (Opening round); 150th AFL match (round 5)

=== Results ===
Key
H	Home game
A	Away game
N	Neutral venue game
EF	Elimination final
SF	Elimination final

Table of 2026 AFL season results
Round	Date	Result	Score			Opponent	Score			Ground		Attendance	Ladder
Round	Date	Result	G	B	T	Opponent	G	B	T	Ground		Attendance	Ladder
OR	6 March	Lost	10	9	69	Gold Coast	19	11	125	People First Stadium	A	19,859	9th
1	14 March	Won	16	14	110	Fremantle	14	16	100	GMHBA Stadium	H	27,815	9th
2	Bye												14th ▼
3	26 March	Won	9	14	68	Adelaide	9	6	60	GMHBA Stadium	H	20,403	10th ▲
4	6 April	Lost	14	7	91	Hawthorn	13	14	92	Melbourne Cricket Ground	A	84,712	11th ▼
5	12 April	Won	17	20	122	West Coast	11	10	76	Norwood Oval	N	9,434	8th ▲
6	17 April	Won	19	17	131	Western Bulldogs	8	8	56	GMHBA Stadium	H	33,200	6th ▲
7	25 April	Lost	10	5	65	Port Adelaide	13	17	95	Adelaide Oval	A	41,164	9th ▼
8	2 May	Won	21	9	135	North Melbourne	13	8	86	GMHBA Stadium	H	32,485	6th ▲
9	9 May	Won	18	14	122	Collingwood	9	14	68	Melbourne Cricket Ground	H	83,166	5th ▲
10	14 May	Won	17	15	117	Brisbane Lions	11	10	76	The Gabba	A	29,221	3rd ▲
11	23 May	Won	15	17	107	Sydney	12	8	80	GMHBA Stadium	H	35,869	3rd
12	29 May	Lost	12	12	84	Carlton	12	16	88	Melbourne Cricket Ground	A	61,081	4th ▼
13	4 June	Lost	10	14	74	Adelaide	11	9	75	Adelaide Oval	A	42,340	4th
14	12 June	Won	15	15	105	Gold Coast	8	12	60	GMHBA Stadium	H	30,276	3rd ▲
15	18 June	Lost	14	6	90	Fremantle	14	15	99	Optus Stadium	A	55,201	4th ▼
16	Bye												4th
17	2 July	Lost	14	17	101	Brisbane Lions	19	9	123	GMHBA Stadium	H	26,741	7th ▼
18	11 July	Lost	11	7	73	Greater Western Sydney	12	14	86	Engie Stadium	A	13,281	9th ▼
19	16 July	Won	15	12	102	St Kilda	11	9	75	GMHBA Stadium	H	23,737	9th
20	24 July	Won	18	9	117	Melbourne	14	13	97	Melbourne Cricket Ground	A	49,292	9th
21	30 July	Won	15	7	97	Collingwood	10	12	72	Melbourne Cricket Ground	A	60,023	7th ▲
22	8 August	Won	17	15	117	Essendon	7	8	50	GMHBA Stadium	H	33,379	7th
23	15 August	Won	19	11	125	North Melbourne	17	8	110	Marvel Stadium	A	35,529	6th ▲
24	22 August	Won	20	13	133	Richmond	11	10	76	GMHBA Stadium	H	29,194	5th ▲
EF	4 September	Won	14	23	107	Carlton	11	8	74	Melbourne Cricket Ground	N	96,680	—
SF	11 September	Lost	16	10	106	Fremantle	18	12	120	Optus Stadium	A	59,725	—

=== Ladder ===
Pos	Team	Pld	W	L	D	PF	PA	PP	Pts	Qualification
1	Fremantle	23	19	4	0	2286	1666	137.2	76	Finals series
2	Sydney	23	18	5	0	2543	1869	136.1	72	Finals series
3	Brisbane Lions (P)	23	16	7	0	2499	2054	121.7	64	Finals series
4	Hawthorn	23	15	6	2	2260	1881	120.1	64	Finals series
5	Geelong	23	15	8	0	2355	1925	122.3	60	Finals series
6	Adelaide	23	15	8	0	2169	1849	117.3	60	Finals series
7	Melbourne	23	15	8	0	2301	2099	109.6	60	Finals series
8	Western Bulldogs	23	13	9	1	1901	1992	95.4	54	Finals series
9	Collingwood	23	12	9	2	2021	1974	102.4	52	Finals series
10	Carlton	23	12	10	1	2007	1978	101.5	50	Finals series
11	St Kilda	23	10	13	0	2030	1974	102.8	40	
12	Greater Western Sydney	23	10	13	0	2073	2095	98.9	40	
13	Gold Coast	23	9	14	0	2011	2128	94.5	36	
14	North Melbourne	23	9	14	0	1932	2175	88.8	36	
15	Port Adelaide	23	7	16	0	1804	2048	88.1	28	
16	West Coast	23	4	19	0	1615	2333	69.2	16	
17	Richmond	23	3	20	0	1483	2373	62.5	12	
18	Essendon	23	2	21	0	1601	2478	64.6	8	

Source: afl.com.au
Rules for classification: 1) points; 2) percentage; 3) number of points for
(P) Premiers

=== Awards ===
==== League awards ====
- All-Australian:
  - Oliver Dempsey (Midfield)
  - Bailey Smith (Midfield) (Note: Max Holmes and Connor O'Sullivan were also selected in the initial squad.)
- 2026 AFL Rising Star: Mitchell Edwards (Nominee – Round 21)
- AFLPA 22 Under 22 team: Connor O'Sullivan (Defence)
- AFL Coaches Association awards:
  - Development Coach of the Year: Nigel Lappin
  - Career & Education Award: James Kelly

==== Club Awards ====
- Carji Greeves Medal: Bailey Smith (178 votes)
- Best Young Player Award: Mitchell Edwards
- Tom Harley Best Clubman: Mark Blicavs
- Carter Family Community Champion Award: Shaun Mannagh

== VFL team ==
Geelong Football Club
2026 VFL season
- President: Grant McCabe
- Coach: Mark Corrigan (4th season)
- Captains: Dan Capiron (3rd season)
- Home ground: GMHBA Stadium
- VFL season: 16 wins, 2 losses (Minor premiers)
- Final series: Runners-up
- Best and Fairest: George Stevens
- Leading goalkicker: Jesse Mellor (40)

=== Season summary ===
Mark Corrigan continued as coach of the club's VFL program for a fourth season. Dan Capiron continued as captain, with Marcus Herbert as vice-captain.

In the 2026 AFL mid-season rookie draft, two Geelong VFL listed players were chosen by AFL clubs. Richmond selected young defender Kye Annand while West Coast selected Herbert.

Geelong was positioned either first or second on the ladder after every round of the competition, losing just two matches on the way to securing the club's third minor premiership. Jesse Mellor (40 goals) and Jamieson Ballantyne (34 goals) were among the top ten goalkickers for the season.

After comfortably winning their two finals, the team progressed to the Grand Final against Box Hill, the club's first since 2013. In blustery conditions at Ikon Park in front of a sold out crowd of 12,941, Geelong lost the Grand Final 5.9 (39) to Box Hill 8.14 (62). The Cats had ten more inside 50m entries than their opposition, but were unable to master the conditions and the defensive game of their opponents.

AFL-listed midfielder George Stevens tied with Frankston captain Trent Mynott to win the J.J. Liston Trophy as the league's best and fairest, the third Geelong player to win that award. Stevens also won the club's best and fairest award ahead of Mitch Knevitt and Lenny Hoffman.

=== Results ===
Key
H	Home game
A	Away game
QF	Qualifying final
PF	Preliminary final
GF	Grand Final

Table of season results
Round	Date	Result	Score			Opponent	Score			Ground	
Round	Date	Result	G	B	T	Opponent	G	B	T	Ground	
1	March 20	Won	24	19	163	Essendon	12	6	78	GMHBA Stadium	H
2	March 27	Won	19	9	123	Box Hill	11	10	76	GMHBA Stadium	H
3	April 4	Won	12	18	90	Werribee	6	10	46	Avalon Airport Oval	A
4	April 17	Lost	7	9	51	Footscray	12	12	84	GMHBA Stadium	H
5	Bye										
6	May 2	Won	11	20	86	North Melbourne	11	7	73	GMHBA Stadium	H
7	May 9	Won	17	14	116	Collingwood	8	7	55	Victoria Park	A
8	May 15	Won	15	25	115	Brisbane	7	7	49	Brighton Homes Arena	A
9	May 23	Won	12	18	90	Sydney	10	16	76	GMHBA Stadium	H
10	May 30	Won	20	11	131	Carlton	12	9	81	Ikon Park	A
11	June 6	Won	13	16	94	Sandringham	5	6	36	Trevor Barker Beach Oval	A
12	June 13	Won	22	15	147	Gold Coast	5	4	34	GMHBA Stadium	H
13	June 20	Won	14	9	93	Southport	6	10	46	Fankhauser Reserve	A
14	Bye										
15	July 3	Won	15	16	106	Frankston	8	6	54	Kinetic Stadium	A
16	July 11	Won	23	14	152	Richmond	11	4	70	GMHBA Stadium	H
17	July 18	Won	9	17	71	St Kilda	6	9	45	RSEA Park	A
18	July 25	Won	17	14	116	Casey	9	9	63	Casey Fields	A
19	July 31	Lost	12	12	84	Collingwood	17	10	112	GMHBA Stadium	H
20	Bye										
21	August 16	Won	16	17	113	North Melbourne	12	7	79	Arden Street Oval	A
QF	August 29	Won	13	11	89	Tasmania	9	12	66	GMHBA Stadium	H
PF	September 13	Won	14	12	96	Port Melbourne	6	13	49	GMHBA Stadium	H
GF	September 20	Lost	5	9	39	Box Hill	8	14	62	Ikon Park	N

=== Ladder ===
Pos	Team	Pld	W	L	D	PF	PA	PP	Pts	Qualification
1	Geelong (R)	18	16	2	0	1941	1157	167.8	64	Finals series
2	Werribee	18	13	4	1	1699	1414	120.2	54	Finals series
3	Box Hill (P)	18	12	6	0	1657	1448	114.4	48	Finals series
4	Tasmania	18	11	6	1	1822	1603	113.7	46	Finals series
5	Essendon (R)	18	11	7	0	1743	1731	100.7	44	Finals series

Source: AFL.com.au
Rules for classification: 1) points; 2) percentage; 3) number of points for
(R) Club is the reserves team of a senior club of the Australian Football League
(P) Premiers

=== Awards ===
==== League Awards ====
- J. J. Liston Trophy (best and fairest): George Stevens (Geelong) – 22 votes (tied) (Note: With Trent Mynott (Frankston).) (Note: Ben Hobbs (Port Melbourne) polled 26 votes, Jacob Dawson (Southport) polled 25 votes, but both were ineligible to win due to suspension.)
- VFL Team of the Year:
  - Nathan Kreuger (defence)
  - Mitch Knevitt (midfield)
  - George Stevens (midfield)
  - Mark Corrigan (coach)

==== Club Awards ====
- Best and Fairest: George Stevens (148 votes)
- Little Vic Award (Best first year player): Lachlan Weidemann

== AFLW team ==
Geelong Football Club
2026 AFL Women's season
- President: Grant McCabe
- Coach: Michael Stinear (1st season)
- Captains: Nina Morrison & Rebecca Webster (1st season)
- Home ground: GMHBA Stadium
- AFLW season: 11 wins, 1 loss (2nd)
- Finals series: Lost semi final
- Leading goalkicker: Jacqueline Parry (26 goals)
- Highest home attendance: 15,226 vs. St Kilda (round 2)
- Lowest home attendance: 2,862 vs. Essendon (round 4)
- Average home attendance: 5,102

=== Season summary ===
Following the retirement of former captain Meg McDonald, the club appointed Nina Morrison and Rebecca Webster as co-captains for the 2026 season.

Ahead of the inaugural AFL Women's international match, Geelong players Georgie Prespakis (Australia), Rachel Kearns (Ireland), and Aishling Moloney (Ireland) were selected to represent their countries. Geelong assistant coach Elise Coventry was asked to be a part of the Ireland coaching panel under head coach Colin O'Riordan. Following withdrawal of players due to injury, Nina Morrison was added to the Australian squad.

Before the start of the season, Geelong faced Melbourne and Western Bulldogs in two match simulation meetings in July, with an official practice match against Brisbane on 25 July at Brighton Homes Arena. Brisbane won that match 8.9 (57) to Geelong 8.6 (54) in a closely fought game. A third match simulation was due to be held against Carlton in early August.

Experienced defender Georgie Rankin was placed on the inactive list before the start of the season after suffering a serious neck injury during a training session. Rankin was hospitalised following the incident.

Opening the season against reigning back-to-back premiers North Melbourne in a doubleheader at Marvel Stadium, Geelong suffered a record defeat, losing by 73 points despite leading midway through the second quarter. The team bounced back the following weekend, scoring 16.4 (100) against St Kilda to record a 85-point victory, the club's highest winning margin and only the second time the women's team had scored 100 points. Forward Jacqueline Parry kicked six goals in the match to equal the club's individual match goal scoring record.

A mounting injury list before the club's round 4 match with Essendon resulted in the club naming two players from the VFL Women's squad (Simone Nalder and Mekah Morrissy) as emergencies.

Keeping Richmond scoreless in the second half of their round 8 match at Ikon Park on a Friday night, the team extended their winning streak to seven matches to temporarily take first place on the AFLW ladder. From then on, the team continued their winning streak, extending it to 11 matches to finish second on the ladder at the end of the home and away season. Forward Jacqueline Parry kicked 26 goals for the season to finish second behind Sydney's Chloe Molloy as the leading AFL Women's goalkicker for the season. Overall, the team ended the season with the highest scoring campaign in the history of the competition, scoring 871 points to eclipse the record of 868 points set by North Melbourne in 2025.

On the eve of the club's final home fixture, Jasmin Stewart announced her retirement from the sport. Stewart joined Geelong before the start of the season after starting her AFL Women's career with Fremantle in 2018.

=== Coaching staff ===
Following the departure of Daniel Lowther after five seasons as head coach, in December 2025 the club appointed Mick Stinear as head coach. Stinear had previously coached Melbourne to the 2022 premiership in the seventh season of the AFL Women's competition. Stinear was assisted by former Geelong AFL player Sam Simpson, former North Melbourne assistant coach Ryan Pendelbury, and returning assistant coach Elise Coventry.

2026 Geelong coaching staff
Role	Name
Senior coach	Mick Stinear
Assistant coach	Sam Simpson
Assistant coach	Ryan Pendlebury
Assistant coach	Elise Coventry

=== Playing list ===
==== Changes ====
Deletions from playing list
Player	Reason	Ref.
Kate Darby	Retired	
Meg McDonald	Retired	
Shelley Scott	Retired	
Erica Fowler	Retired	
Melissa Bragg	Delisted	
Gabbi Featherston	Delisted	
Bella Smith	Delisted	
Caitlin Thorne	Delisted	

Additions to playing list
Player	Acquired	Ref.
Jasmin Stewart	Delisted free agent from Port Adelaide	
Alissa Brook	Delisted free agent from Port Adelaide	
Nicola Stevens	Traded from St Kilda	
Emma Murray	International rookie signing from Waterford GAA	
Evie Cowcher	No. 11, 2025 national draft	
Priya Bowering	No. 27, 2025 national draft	
Renee Morgan	No. 43, 2025 national draft	
Annie Lee	Replacement player signing from Geelong VFLW	

==== Statistics ====
Updated as at round 12

Key
#	Denotes player who was on the club's rookie list.
^	Denotes player who was on the club's inactive list.

Playing list and statistics
Player	No.	Games	Goals	Behinds	Kicks	Handballs	Disposals	Marks	Tackles	Hitouts	Milestone(s)
Mikayla Bowen	1	12	2	4	152	157	309	58	74	0	—N/a
Nicola Stevens	2	8	0	0	27	19	46	5	10	0	Club debut (round 3); 100th AFLW match (round 11)
Amy McDonald	3	8	3	0	78	96	174	14	29	0	—N/a
Caitlin Tipping#	4	—N/a	—N/a	—N/a	—N/a	—N/a	—N/a	—N/a	—N/a	—N/a	—N/a
Jacqueline Parry	5	11	26	6	88	59	114	49	21	8	—N/a
Julia Crockett-Grills	6	12	8	4	114	53	167	33	18	0	—N/a
Kate Surman	7	9	3	4	44	64	108	20	20	0	—N/a
Zali Friswell	8	4	0	1	15	32	47	9	10	0	—N/a
Nina Morrison	9	12	8	3	156	135	291	35	94	0	—N/a
Georgie Rankin^	10	—N/a	—N/a	—N/a	—N/a	—N/a	—N/a	—N/a	—N/a	—N/a	—N/a
Evie Cowcher	11	11	0	0	55	65	120	37	22	0	AFLW debut (round 1)
Kate Kenny#	12	2	1	2	9	10	19	4	7	0	—N/a
Sienna Tallariti	13	—N/a	—N/a	—N/a	—N/a	—N/a	—N/a	—N/a	—N/a	—N/a	—N/a
Chloe Scheer	14	12	22	16	72	34	106	34	15	0	50th AFLW match (round 1)
Priya Bowering	15	3	0	1	13	9	22	3	2	0	AFLW debut (round 1)
Chantel Emonson	16	12	0	1	145	47	192	50	30	0	—N/a
Jasmin Stewart	17	6	5	1	24	15	39	12	7	0	Club debut (round 4)
Piper Dunlop	18	11	1	1	18	67	85	10	17	176	—N/a
Annie Lee	19	9	0	0	57	34	91	23	16	0	Club debut (round 4)
Alissa Brook	20	—N/a	—N/a	—N/a	—N/a	—N/a	—N/a	—N/a	—N/a	—N/a	—N/a
Rebecca Webster	21	12	1	1	160	109	269	58	30	0	—N/a
Rachel Kearns	22	12	10	6	96	72	168	37	31	0	—N/a
Bryde O'Rourke	23	11	5	3	58	72	130	23	17	0	—N/a
Chantal Mason	24	12	9	14	97	61	158	40	34	43	—N/a
Renee Morgan	25	3	0	1	12	15	27	3	10	0	AFLW debut (round 4)
Claudia Gunjaca	26	10	0	0	59	37	96	29	21	1	—N/a
Emma Kilpatrick	27	3	0	0	17	13	30	7	7	0	—N/a
Emma Murray#	28	12	4	2	62	77	139	11	43	0	AFLW debut (round 1)
Lexi Gregor	30	11	0	0	41	24	65	25	26	2	—N/a
Georgie Prespakis	41	12	2	8	160	207	367	30	61	0	—N/a
Aishling Moloney	45	12	17	9	130	65	195	55	21	4	50th AFLW match (semi final)

=== Results ===
Key
H	Home game
A	Away game
QF	Qualifying final
SF	Semi-final

Table of season results
Round	Date	Result	Score			Opponent	Score			Ground		Attendance	Ladder
Round	Date	Result	G	B	T	Opponent	G	B	T	Ground		Attendance	Ladder
1	August 15	Lost	3	9	27	North Melbourne	15	10	100	Marvel Stadium	A	14,573	18th
2	August 22	Won	16	4	100	St Kilda	2	3	15	GMHBA Stadium	H	15,266	9th ▲
3	August 30	Won	10	4	64	Gold Coast	8	9	57	People First Stadium	A	1,838	6th ▲
4	September 6	Won	13	5	83	Essendon	7	9	51	GMHBA Stadium	H	2,862	4th ▲
5	September 12	Won	8	9	57	Adelaide	6	10	46	Thomas Farms Oval	A	2,560	5th ▼
6	September 19	Won	14	6	90	Collingwood	7	7	49	Victoria Park	A	2,041	3rd ▲
7	September 24	Won	12	10	82	Hawthorn	7	4	46	GMHBA Stadium	H	3,430	3rd
8	October 2	Won	7	12	54	Richmond	3	2	20	Ikon Park	A	1,482	3rd
9	October 10	Won	14	12	96	Greater Western Sydney	5	3	33	GMHBA Stadium	H	2,924	2nd ▲
10	October 17	Won	8	18	66	West Coast	1	7	13	Sullivan Logistics Stadium	A	2,234	2nd
11	October 24	Won	9	10	64	Fremantle	5	4	34	GMHBA Stadium	H	3,004	2nd
12	October 30	Won	13	10	88	Western Bulldogs	3	2	20	GMHBA Stadium	H	3,126	2nd
QF	November 7	Lost	8	4	52	Melbourne	8	8	56	Ikon Park	N	4,743	—
SF	November 14	Lost	7	5	47	Sydney	8	2	50	GMHBA Stadium	H	5,656	—

=== Ladder ===
Pos	Team	Pld	W	L	D	PF	PA	PP	Pts	Qualification
1	North Melbourne	12	11	1	0	789	320	246.6	44	Finals series
2	Geelong	12	11	1	0	871	484	180.0	44	Finals series
3	Melbourne	12	10	2	0	715	405	176.5	40	Finals series
4	Carlton	12	9	3	0	554	416	133.2	36	Finals series
5	Gold Coast	12	9	3	0	609	458	133.0	36	Finals series
6	Sydney	12	9	3	0	606	527	115.0	36	Finals series
7	Western Bulldogs	12	8	4	0	495	448	110.5	32	Finals series
8	Hawthorn	12	7	5	0	580	513	113.1	28	Finals series
9	Port Adelaide	12	6	6	0	422	454	93.0	24	
10	Fremantle	12	5	7	0	477	489	97.5	20	
11	Adelaide	12	5	7	0	528	544	97.1	20	
12	Brisbane	12	4	8	0	504	502	100.4	16	
13	West Coast	12	4	8	0	459	656	70.0	16	
14	Richmond	12	4	8	0	468	714	65.5	16	
15	Greater Western Sydney	12	2	10	0	479	691	69.3	8	
16	Essendon	12	2	10	0	386	646	59.8	8	
17	Collingwood	12	1	11	0	350	646	54.2	4	
18	St Kilda	12	1	11	0	332	711	46.7	4	

Source: afl.com.au
Rules for classification: 1) points; 2) percentage; 3) number of points for

=== Awards ===
==== League awards ====
- Rising Star: Chantal Mason (nominated, round 11)
- AFLPA 22 Under 22 team: Evie Cowcher (Defence)

== VFLW team ==
Geelong Football Club
2026 VFL Women's season
- President: Grant McCabe
- Coach: Taylah Hassett (2nd season)
- Captains: Mel Staunton (2nd season)
- Home ground: Deakin University Elite Sports Precinct
- VFLW season: 8 wins, 6 losses (7th)
- Best and Fairest: Lucy Marescuk
- Leading goalkicker: Nikita Harris (14)

=== Season summary ===
Taylah Hassett would again coach the team, with Mel Staunton as captain. Brooke Borchard, who transferred to the club from Casey was nominated as vice-captain.

It was an improved effort again for the squad, winning eight of their 14 matches, including the last five matches in a row. The eight wins more than the previous two seasons combined.

Lucy Marescuk won the team's best and fairest award, playing all 14 matches, averaging almost 20 disposals and more than six tackles per match.

Following the end of the season, Taylah Hassett ended her time with the club after two seasons coaching the VFLW program. Hassett had continued to play local football with the Grovedale Football Club, as well as being a qualified nurse and midwife before joining the Cats.

=== Results ===
Key
H	Home game
A	Away game

Table of season results
Round	Date	Result	Score			Opponent	Score			Ground	
Round	Date	Result	G	B	T	Opponent	G	B	T	Ground	
1	May 16	Lost	3	2	20	Williamstown	12	3	75	Deakin University Elite Sports Precinct	H
2	May 23	Won	4	8	32	Essendon	0	12	12	Windy Hill	A
3	May 30	Lost	3	7	25	Box Hill	7	5	47	Deakin University Elite Sports Precinct	H
4	June 6	Lost	2	7	19	Sandringham	6	5	41	Trevor Barker Beach Oval	A
5	June 12	Won	4	6	30	Western Bulldogs	4	5	29	Mission Whitten Oval	A
6	June 20	Won	4	1	25	Darebin	1	1	7	Deakin University Elite Sports Precinct	H
7	Bye										
8	July 4	Lost	3	3	21	North Melbourne Werribee	14	11	95	Avalon Airport Oval	A
9	July 11	Lost	1	7	13	Tasmania	5	7	37	North Hobart Oval	A
10	July 18	Lost	4	2	26	Carlton	10	8	68	Deakin University Elite Sports Precinct	H
11	July 25	Won	7	5	47	Casey	2	3	15	Casey Fields	A
12	August 1	Won	4	3	27	Collingwood	2	6	18	Deakin University Elite Sports Precinct	H
13	Bye										
14	16 August	Won	8	12	60	Tasmania	3	0	18	Deakin University Elite Sports Precinct	H
15	22 August	Won	3	9	27	Carlton	3	6	24	Ikon Park	A
16	29 August	Won	5	8	38	Port Melbourne	5	4	34	Deakin University Elite Sports Precinct	H

=== Ladder ===
Pos	Team	Pld	W	L	D	PF	PA	PP	Pts	Qualification
5	Port Melbourne	14	9	5	0	525	450	116.7	36	Finals series
6	Western Bulldogs	14	9	5	0	538	487	110.5	36	Finals series
7	Geelong Cats	14	8	6	0	416	520	80.0	32	
8	Tasmania	14	5	9	0	496	649	76.4	20	
9	Essendon	14	4	9	1	441	625	70.6	18	

Source: AFL.com.au
Rules for classification: 1) points; 2) percentage; 3) number of points for.

=== Awards ===
- VFL Women's Team of the Year: Annie Lee (defence)

==== Club Awards ====
- Best and Fairest: Lucy Marescuk (169 votes)
- The Hoops Award: Brooke Borchard
