= List of Tasmania Football Club coaches =

The following is a list of the Tasmania Football Club senior-level coaches since the club's competitive debut in 2026. The club will begin playing in the 2026 VFL and VFL Women's seasons and will debut in the Australian Football League (AFL) and AFL Women's (AFLW) in 2028.

== Men's team coaches ==
Statistics are correct as of the conclusion of round 13, 2026

VFL (2026–2027)
| No. | Coach | Coached | Won | Lost | Drew | Win % | Years | Ref |
|---|---|---|---|---|---|---|---|---|
| 1 | Jeromey Webberley | 11 | 7 | 4 | 0 | 63.64% | 2026–present | |
| 2 | Ken Hinkley | 0 | 0 | 0 | 0 | 0 | From 2028 | |

== Women's team coaches ==
Statistics are correct as of the conclusion of round 6, 2026

VFLW (2026–2027)
| No. | Coach | Coached | Won | Lost | Drew | Win % | Years | Ref |
|---|---|---|---|---|---|---|---|---|
| 1 | Georgia Walker | 5 | 1 | 4 | 0 | 20.00% | 2026–present | |
