= 2022 VFL Women's season =

- Teams: 12
- Premiers: Essendon; 1st premiership
- Minor premiers: Essendon; 1st minor premiership
- Best and fairest: Georgia Nanscawen; Essendon (33 votes)
- Leading goalkicker: Federica Frew; Essendon (29 goals)
- Matches played: 91

The 2022 VFL Women's season was the sixth season of the VFL Women's (VFLW). The season commenced on 12 February and concluded with the grand final on 3 July. Essendon went through the season undefeated and won its first VFLW premiership, defeating the Southern Saints by 35 points in the grand final; this resulted in the first completed VFLW season since 2019 after COVID-19 disruptions affected the previous two seasons.

The season consisted of 14 games for each of the 12 clubs, all of whom returned from the 2021 VFL Women's season. For the first time, all matches were available to watch via the AFL website/app or the VFL/VFLW YouTube channel.

== Clubs ==
- Carlton, Casey, Collingwood, Darebin, Essendon, Geelong Cats, Hawthorn
- North Melbourne, Port Melbourne, Southern Saints, Western Bulldogs, Williamstown

== Ladder ==
Pos	Team	Pld	W	L	D	PF	PA	PP	Pts	Qualification
1	Essendon (P)	14	12	0	2	906	250	362.4	52	Finals series
2	Hawthorn	14	12	1	1	798	220	362.7	50	Finals series
3	Casey	14	11	3	0	701	331	211.8	44	Finals series
4	Geelong Cats	14	10	4	0	581	366	158.7	40	Finals series
5	Southern Saints	14	9	4	1	537	424	126.7	38	Finals series
6	Collingwood	14	7	7	0	450	499	90.2	28	Finals series
7	North Melbourne	14	6	8	0	412	557	74.0	24	
8	Darebin	14	5	9	0	307	568	54.0	20	
9	Carlton	14	4	9	1	392	599	65.4	18	
10	Port Melbourne	14	3	11	0	305	662	46.1	12	
11	Williamstown	14	2	11	1	363	541	67.1	10	
12	Western Bulldogs	14	0	14	0	144	879	16.4	0	

Source: AFL.com.au
Rules for classification: 1) points; 2) percentage; 3) number of points for.
(P) Premiers

== Finals series ==
Match-ups set using the second McIntyre final six system.

Qualifying final
June 11, Windy Hill
1	Essendon	8.12 (60)
2	Hawthorn	1.1 (7)
Elimination finals
June 12, Casey Fields
3	Casey	7.3 (45)
6	Collingwood	1.4 (10)
June 11, Deakin University, Waurn Ponds
4	Geelong Cats	2.6 (18)
5	Southern Saints	4.2 (26)

Semi-finals
June 19, Windy Hill
Essendon	11.10 (76)
Casey	1.3 (9)
June 19, Box Hill City Oval
Hawthorn	6.3 (39)
Southern Saints	8.7 (55)

Preliminary final
June 26, ETU Stadium
Casey	2.3 (15)
Southern Saints	5.5 (35)

Grand final
July 3, ETU Stadium
Essendon	6.6 (42)
Southern Saints	0.7 (7)

=== Qualifying and elimination finals ===
	Qualifying final
Saturday, 11 June (11:05 am)	Essendon 8.12 (60)	def.	Hawthorn 1.1 (7)	Windy Hill	Report

	Elimination finals
Saturday, 11 June (1:05 pm)	Geelong Cats 2.6 (18)	def. by	Southern Saints 4.2 (26)	Deakin University Elite Sports Precinct	Report
Sunday, 12 June (11:35 am)	Casey 7.3 (45)	def.	Collingwood 1.4 (10)	Casey Fields	Report

=== Semi finals ===
	Semi finals
Sunday, 19 June (11:05 am)	Essendon 11.10 (76)	def.	Casey 1.3 (9)	Windy Hill	Report
Sunday, 19 June (1:05 pm)	Hawthorn 6.3 (39)	def. by	Southern Saints 8.7 (55)	Box Hill City Oval	Report

=== Preliminary final ===
	Preliminary final
Sunday, 26 June (4:05 pm)	Casey 2.3 (15)	def. by	Southern Saints 5.5 (35)	ETU Stadium	Report

=== Grand final ===
2022 VFLW Grand Final
Sunday, 3 July (12:15 pm)	Essendon	def.	Southern Saints	ETU Stadium	Report
2.2 (14); 4.3 (27); 6.6 (42); 6.6 (42)	Q1; Q2; Q3; Final	0.0 (0); 0.4 (4); 0.4 (4); 0.7 (7)	Lisa Hardeman Medal: Alana Barba (Essendon); Television broadcast: Seven Network
Frew, Tierney 2 Doonan, Nalder 1	Goals	Nil
Barba, Nanscawen, Radford, Tierney	Best	Capsalis, Stuart
Nanscawen (knee)	Injuries	Nil

== Awards ==
- Lambert-Pearce Medal (Best and Fairest): Georgia Nanscawen (Essendon) – 33 votes
- Rohenna Young Medal (Leading Goal kicker): Federica Frew (Essendon) – 29 goals
- Debbie Lee Medal (Rising Star): Tahlia Fellows (Casey)
- Coaches MVP: Georgia Nanscawen (Essendon)
- Coach of the Year: Brendan Major (Essendon)
- Lisa Hardeman Medal (Best on ground VFL Women's Grand Final): Alana Barba (Essendon)

2022 VFL Women's Team of the Year
B:	Eliza Vale (Western Bulldogs)	Katelyn Lee (Collingwood)	
HB:	Grace Buchan (Southern Saints)	Jenna Richardson (Hawthorn)	Nicole Callinan (Darebin)
C:	Samantha Johnson (Casey)	Hannah Stuart (Southern Saints)	Winnie Laing (Southern Saints)
HF:	Mia-Rae Clifford (c) (Essendon)	Renee Tierney (Essendon)	Tahlia Fellows (Casey)
F:	Federica Frew (Essendon)	Tamara Luke (Hawthorn)	
Foll:	Elizabeth McGrath (North Melbourne)	Georgia Nanscawen (Essendon)	Laura Gardiner (Geelong Cats)
Int:	Amelia Radford (Essendon)	Matilda Zander (Collingwood)	Olivia Barton (Port Melbourne)
Int:	Paige Sheppard (Geelong Cats)	Tayla Kearns (Southern Saints)	
Coach:	Brendan Major (Essendon)		

=== Club best and fairest winners ===
Club	Best & Fairest	Ref
Carlton	Millie Klingbeil	
Casey	Sammie Johnson	
Collingwood	Matilda Zander	
Darebin	Nicole Callinan	
Essendon	Georgia Nanscawen	
Geelong Cats	Paige Sheppard	
Hawthorn	Jordan Mifsud	
North Melbourne	Liz McGrath	
Port Melbourne	Kaitlyn O'Keefe	
Southern Saints	Hannah Stuart	
Western Bulldogs	Eliza Vale	
Williamstown	Ruby Tripodi	
Williamstown	Gabrielle Biedenweb-Webster	

== Notable events ==
- All VFLW matches were streamed on a new online platform, known as "VFLW.tv", during the 2022 season.

== See also ==
- 2022 VFL season
