= List of Tasmania Football Club captains =

List of captains of the Tasmania Football Club

The following is a list of the Tasmania Football Club senior-level captains since the club's competitive debut in 2026. The club will begin playing in the 2026 VFL and VFL Women's seasons and will debut in the Australian Football League (AFL) and AFL Women's (AFLW) in 2028.

== Men's team captains ==
VFL (2026–2027)
Dates	Captain(s)
2026–	Robbie Fox

== Women's team captains ==
VFLW (2026–2027)
Dates	Captain(s)
2026–	Meghan Gaffney
2026–	Georgia Hill (Note: Meghan Gaffney was appointed captain ahead of the 2026 season, however she suffered an ACL injury in pre-season and was ruled out from playing for the entire season. The captaincy was filled by Georgia Hill.)
