= Alex Perry (disambiguation) =

Alex Perry (born 1963) is an Australian fashion designer and television presenter.

Alex Perry may also refer to:

- Alex Perry (Australian footballer) (born 1940), Australian rules footballer
- Alex Perry (English footballer) (born 1998), English football midfielder
- Alex Perry (table tennis) (born 1980), English table tennis player
- Alex Ross Perry (born 1984), American film director, screenwriter and actor
