= Alana Barba =

Australian rules footballer (born 2001)

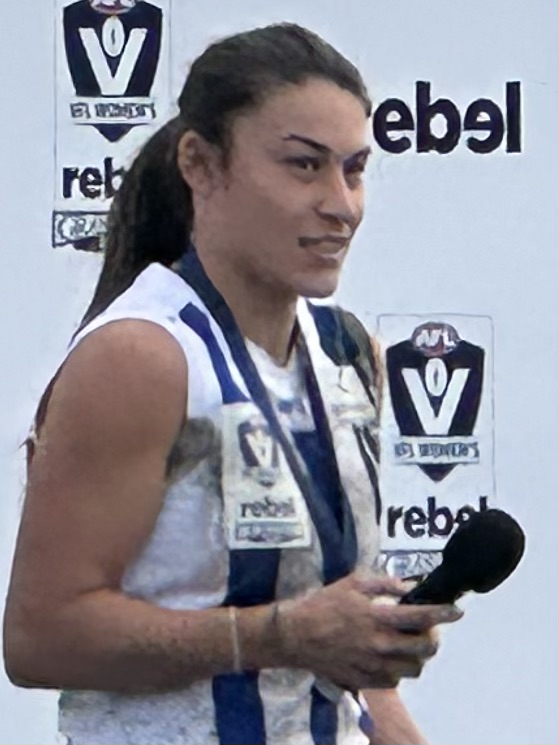
- Barba in 2025

Personal information
- Full name: Alana Barba
- Born: 26 September 2001 (age 25)
- Original team: Essendon (VFLW)
- Debut: Round 1, 2022 (S6), Gold Coast vs. Greater Western Sydney, at Great Barrier Reef Arena
- Height: 164 cm (5 ft 5 in)

Playing career^{1}
Years	Club	Games (Goals)
2022 (S6)	Gold Coast	2 (0)
2022 (S7)–2023	Essendon	10 (0)
Total		12 (0)
- ^{1} Playing statistics correct to the end of the 2023 season.

Career highlights
- 4× VFLW premiership player: 2022, 2024, 2025, 2026; 3x Lisa Hardeman Medal: 2022, 2025, 2026

Alana Barba (born 26 September 2001) is an Australian rules footballer who plays for North Melbourne Werribee in the VFL Women's (VFLW). She previously played for Gold Coast and Essendon in the AFL Women's.

== Football career ==
=== Gold Coast Suns (2022) ===
Barba joined the Suns ahead of the 2022 (S6) season as one of two replacements for players existing players moved to the inactive list.

Barba made her debut for the Suns in Round 1 of 2022 (S6) against the GWS Giants. She was dropped for the Round 2 match-up against the West Coast Eagles and didn't earn a recall until Round 9 against Carlton. This turned out to be Barba’s final game for the Suns, being omitted for the Round 10 match against Fremantle before not being offered a contract for the 2022 (S7) season.

Following her delisting, Barba returned to the Essendon Bombers in the VFLW.

=== Essendon (2022–2023) ===
After winning the 2022 VFLW Premiership with the Bombers where she was award the Lisa Hardeman Medal as player of the match in the Grand Final, Barba was added as a delisted free agent to Essendon’s inaugural AFLW list for the 2022 (S7) season.

Barba played all 10 games in her debut season for the Bombers.

She was not offered a renewed contract for the 2024 (S9) season.

=== North Melbourne (2024) ===
Following her delisting from Essendon's AFLW squad, Barba played for North Melbourne during the 2024 VFL Women's season, scoring a goal in the last minute of the club's semi-final win against Williamstown, as North Melbourne progressed to their first VFLW Grand Final.

Barba played in her second VFL Women's premiership team, and was amongst the best players for North Melbourne in their victory over the Western Bulldogs.

=== North Melbourne Werribee (2025-) ===
In 2025, Barba played in her third VFL Women's premiership team, and was awarded the Lisa Hardeman Medal for a second time, while playing for North Melbourne Werribee in their victory over Collingwood.

In 2026, Barba played in her fourth VFL Women's premiership team, and was awarded the Lisa Hardeman Medal for a third time, while playing for North Melbourne Werribee in their victory over Williamstown.

== AFLW Statistics ==
Statistics are correct to the end of the 2023 AFL Women's season.

Legend
G	Goals	K	Kicks	D	Disposals	T	Tackles
B	Behinds	H	Handballs	M	Marks

Season	Team	No.	Games	Totals							Averages (per game)						
Season	Team	No.	Games	G	B	K	H	D	M	T	G	B	K	H	D	M	T
2022 (S6)	Gold Coast	21	2	0	0	4	2	6	0	6	0.0	0.0	2.0	1.0	3.0	0.0	3.0
2022 (S7)	Essendon	11	10	0	0	32	37	69	6	28	0	0	3.2	3.7	6.9	0.6	2.8
2023	Essendon	11	0	0	0	0	0	0	0	0	0	0	0	0	0	0	0
Career			12	0	0	36	39	75	6	34	0	0	3.0	3.3	6.3	0.5	2.8
