= Gordon Hynes =

Gordon Hynes may refer to:

- Gord Hynes (born 1966), retired Canadian ice hockey defenceman
- Gordon Hynes (footballer) (born 1944), former Australian rules footballer
