= Neil Tompkins =

Australian rules footballer

Personal information
- Full name: William Neil Tompkins
- Born: 15 January 1927; Geelong, Victoria
- Died: 20 February 1991 (aged 64)
- Original team: Navy / North Geelong
- Height: 185 cm (6 ft 1 in)
- Weight: 90 kg (198 lb)

Playing career^{1}
Years	Club	Games (Goals)
1945	Geelong	12 (3)
- ^{1} Playing statistics correct to the end of 1945.

William Neil Tompkins (15 January 1927 – 20 February 1991) was an Australian rules footballer who played with Geelong in the Victorian Football League (VFL).

Tompkins was a member of Royal Australian Navy and played his early football at North Geelong. He made all of his 12 appearances for Geelong in the 1945 VFL season. Geelong cleared him to Carlton in 1950 but he didn't play any league football at his new club. He was inducted into the North Geelong Football Club's Hall of Fame in 2014.
