= List of sports clubs by membership =

This page lists the sports clubs with the largest number of members in the world. In many European countries, professional football teams are not organized as clubs, but as corporations. This includes all teams in the English Premier League and most teams in the Spanish Primera División and the Italian Serie A. They therefore do not appear on this list, although they sometimes offer interested persons the opportunity to become 'members' for a fee, which gives them advantages in the purchase of tickets and merchandise. In the big four sports leagues in the United States and Canada, clubs are usually franchises owned by private investors. In Germany, most professional sport teams are organized as corporations (GmbH or Aktiengesellschaft); however, in accordance with the 50+1 rule, the majority of votes lies with the registered associations (e. V.), which have members.

== List of largest sports clubs ==
This list contains all clubs with a current membership of 75,000 or more, provided this is sufficiently documented. There may be other clubs that meet this criterion. The data is based on various sources and may therefore vary in terms of the survey period or the standards applied, which may limit comparability. The inclusion of inactive members who have stopped paying their membership fees alongside active members who actually pay their fees is another factor that can distort the reliability of this list.

Sports clubs with more than 75,000 members
Rank	Sports club	Sport	Place	Members	Date
1	FC Bayern Munich	Association football	Munich, Germany	500,000	November 2026
2	S.L. Benfica	Association football	Lisbon, Portugal	436,451	February 2026
3	Club Atlético River Plate	Association football	Buenos Aires, Argentina	352,712	December 2024
4	Boca Juniors	Association football	Buenos Aires, Argentina	282,644	January 2026
5	FC Schalke 04	Association football	Gelsenkirchen, Germany	220,000	July 1st 2026
6	Borussia Dortmund	Association football	Dortmund, Germany	218,000	November 2024
7	Tasmania Football Club	Australian rules football	Tasmania, Australia	210,000	May 2025
8	German Alpine Club Munich section	Mountaineering	Munich, Germany	179,391	December 2023
9	Sporting CP	Association football	Lisbon, Portugal	179,208	June 2025
10	FC Porto	Association football	Porto, Portugal	170,000	December 2025
11	1. FC Köln	Association football	Cologne, Germany	160,000	January 2026
12	FC Barcelona	Association football	Barcelona, Spain	150,317	May 2023
13	AFC Ajax	Association football	Amsterdam, Netherlands	150,000	August 2025
14	Eintracht Frankfurt	Association football	Frankfurt, Germany	150,000	February 2025
15	Hamburger SV	Association football	Hamburg, Germany	140,000	November 2025
16	SC Internacional	Association football	Porto Alegre, Brazil	135,000	March 2024
17	HNK Hajduk Split	Association football	Split, Croatia	120,951	December 2025
18	Grêmio FBPA	Association football	Porto Alegre, Brazil	112,425	September 2023
19	Collingwood Football Club	Australian rules football	Melbourne, Australia	110,102	2024
20	Racing Club de Avellaneda	Association football	Avellaneda, Argentina	102,707	January 2026
21	West Coast Eagles	Australian rules football	Perth, Australia	103,275	2023
22	Austrian Alpine Club Edelweiss section	Mountaineering	Vienna, Austria	102,435	December 2022
23	Richmond Football Club	Australian rules football	Melbourne, Australia	101,349	2023
24	VfB Stuttgart	Association football	Stuttgart, Germany	100,000	3rd May 2024
25	Borussia Mönchengladbach	Association football	Mönchengladbach, Germany	111,250	July 2026
26	Real Madrid CF	Association football	Madrid, Spain	99,781	December 2023
27	Carlton Football Club	Australian rules football	Melbourne, Australia	100,743	2025
28	Club Atlético Independiente	Association football	Avellaneda, Argentina	95,173	August 2023
29	CR Flamengo	Association football	Rio de Janeiro, Brazil	89,859	March 2023
30	Essendon Football Club	Australian rules football	Melbourne, Australia	86,274	2023
31	Feyenoord Rotterdam	Association football	Rotterdam, Netherlands	85,000	May 2024
32	CR Vasco da Gama	Association football	Rio de Janeiro, Brazil	82,611	January 2021
33	Geelong Football Club	Australian rules football	Geelong, Australia	82,155	2023
34	Hawthorn Football Club	Australian rules football	Melbourne, Australia	80,698	2023
35	San Lorenzo de Almagro	Association football	Buenos Aires, Argentina	80,410	August 2023
36	SC Freiburg	Association football	Freiburg im Breisgau, Germany	79,000	October 2025
37	Austrian Alpine Club Austria section	Mountaineering	Vienna, Austria	78,211	December 2022

== List of largest association football clubs ==
Association football clubs with more than 100,000 members
Rank	Club	Place	Members	Date
1	FC Bayern Munich	Munich, Germany	500,000	November 2026
2	S.L. Benfica	Lisbon, Portugal	436,451	February 2026
3	Club Atlético River Plate	Buenos Aires, Argentina	350,000	December 2024
4	Boca Juniors	Buenos Aires, Argentina	335,000	August 2023
5	FC Schalke 04	Gelsenkirchen, Germany	220,000	July 2026
6	Borussia Dortmund	Dortmund, Germany	218,000	November 2024
7	Sporting CP	Lisbon, Portugal	179,208	June 2025
8	FC Porto	Porto, Portugal	170,000	December 2025
9	FC Barcelona	Barcelona, Spain	150,317	May 2023
10	Eintracht Frankfurt	Frankfurt, Germany	150,000	February 2025
11	SC Internacional	Porto Alegre, Brazil	135,000	March 2024
12	1. FC Köln	Cologne, Germany	132,439	September 2023
13	HNK Hajduk Split	Split, Croatia	120,951	December 2025
14	Grêmio FBPA	Porto Alegre, Brazil	113,425	September 2023

== List of largest Australian rules football clubs ==
Australian rules football clubs with more than 75,000 members
Rank	Club	Place	Members	Date
1	Tasmania Football Club	Tasmania, Australia	210,000+	May 2025
2	Collingwood Football Club	Melbourne, Australia	110,102	2024
3	West Coast Eagles	Perth, Australia	103,275	2023
4	Richmond Football Club	Melbourne, Australia	101,349	2023
5	Carlton Football Club	Melbourne, Australia	95,277	2023
6	Essendon Football Club	Melbourne, Australia	86,274	2023
7	Geelong Football Club	Geelong, Australia	82,155	2023
8	Hawthorn Football Club	Melbourne, Australia	80,698	2023

== See also ==
- Sports club
- List of fan-owned sports teams
