= Georgia Walker =

Australian rules footballer (born 1998)

Personal information
- Full name: Georgia Walker
- Born: 7 December 1998 (age 27); Rye, Victoria
- Original team: Seaford (VFLW)
- Draft: 2016 free agent: Collingwood
- Debut: Round 2, 2017, Collingwood vs. Brisbane, at South Pine Sports Complex
- Height: 166 cm (5 ft 5 in)
- Position: Midfielder / defender

Playing career^{1}
Years	Club	Games (Goals)
2017	Collingwood	2 (0)
- ^{1} Playing statistics correct to the end of the 2017 season.

Georgia Walker (born 7 December 1998) is an Australian rules footballer who played for the Collingwood Football Club in the AFL Women's (AFLW).

== Early life and state football ==
Born in Rye, Victoria, Walker began playing with the boys of her local club. In 2015, Walker joined the Dandenong Stingrays and was the captain of the youth girls in her two years with the club. At the same time she also played for Rye Youth Girls and for Seaford in the starting VFL Women's (VFLW) season. She won the Youth Girls Academy Challenge premiership with the Dandenong Stingrays, beating the Sandringham Dragons in the grand final, with Walker winning the award for best on ground.

After playing 2 games for Collingwood in the inaugural AFLW season, Walker joined the Southern Saints ahead of the latter's first VFLW season.

== AFL Women's career ==
After going unselected in the 2016 AFL Women's draft, Walker was signed by Collingwood as a late injury replacement, following Canadian recruit Kendra Heil suffering an anterior cruciate ligament (ACL) injury. She made her debut in round 3, 2017, against Brisbane at South Pine Sports Complex. Walker was delisted by Collingwood ahead of the 2018 season.

On 24 November 2025, Walker was appointed as the inaugural coach for the Tasmania Devils (VFLW) team, which will play its first season in 2026.

== Statistics ==
Statistics are correct to the end of the 2017 season.

Legend
G	Goals	K	Kicks	D	Disposals	T	Tackles
B	Behinds	H	Handballs	M	Marks

Season	Team	No.	Games	Totals							Averages (per game)						
Season	Team	No.	Games	G	B	K	H	D	M	T	G	B	K	H	D	M	T
2017	Collingwood	31	2	0	0	5	3	8	0	3	0.0	0.0	2.5	1.5	4.0	0.0	1.5
Career			2	0	0	5	3	8	0	3	0.0	0.0	2.5	1.5	4.0	0.0	1.5
