= Nick Muller =

Australian rules footballer (1914–1947)

Personal information
- Full name: Nichol Haworth Muller
- Born: 10 September 1914; Geelong, Victoria
- Died: 19 May 1947 (aged 32)
- Original team: North Geelong
- Height: 175 cm (5 ft 9 in)
- Weight: 69 kg (152 lb)

Playing career^{1}
Years	Club	Games (Goals)
1936, 1940	Geelong	10 (0)
- ^{1} Playing statistics correct to the end of 1940.

Nichol Haworth "Nick" Muller (10 September 1914 – 19 May 1947) was an Australian rules footballer who played with Geelong in the Victorian Football League (VFL).

== Career ==
Muller, from North Geelong, made three VFL appearances for Geelong early in the 1936 VFL season.

He didn't play a senior game in 1937, but was a member of the Geelong seconds premiership team. His brother, Angie Muller, played in Geelong's senior premiership that year.

In 1939 he joined Warrnambool in the Hampden Football League and ended the year with another premiership.

He returned to Geelong in 1940 and played seven games, including their semi-final loss to Essendon, which would be his final appearance at VFL level.

== Death ==
Muller died on 19 May 1947, aged 32.

An inquest found that he had died from nicotine poisoning. It was unclear how he had ingested nicotine, as he was a non smoker and hadn't been using any insecticide.
