= 2026 VFL Women's season =

10th season of the VFL Women's

- North Melbourne Werribee players celebrate after winning the 2026 grand final
- Date: 16 May – 20 September 2026
- Teams: 13
- Premiers: North Melbourne Werribee; 3rd premiership
- Runners-up: Williamstown; 1st runners-up result
- Minor premiers: Williamstown; 2nd minor premiership
- Lambert–Pearce Medallist: Emily Eaves (Williamstown – 21 votes)
- Rohenna Young Medallist: Mia Zielinski (Williamstown – 32 goals)

The 2026 VFL Women's season was the tenth season of the VFL Women's (VFLW), the state-level senior women's Australian rules football competition in Victoria. The season began on 16 May and concluded with the grand final on 20 September.

== Background ==
=== League membership ===
In September 2025, the Australian Football League (AFL) announced that the Tasmania Football Club would join the VFL Women's in 2026, thereby increasing the number of teams in the competition to 13. Tasmania will field a senior women's team in the VFLW in 2026 and 2027, before graduating to the AFL Women's (AFLW) in 2028, upon which it is expected to field a reserve women's team in the VFLW. Though a Tasmanian team played in the Victorian Football League (VFL) men's competition from 2001 to 2008, this marked the first time a Tasmanian team had competed in the VFLW.

=== Fixture dates ===
The competition calendar was shifted for the second consecutive season, with the league to be played between May and September, as opposed to between April and August. In announcing the change, Jennie Loughnan, the AFL's head of state league competitions, said "the decision to push back the VFLW season dates ensures more crossover with the NAB AFLW competition." The fixture dates were confirmed on 11 February 2026. This was the first occasion in which the VFLW grand final was held on the same weekend as the VFL men's grand final. Though the top six teams still qualified for the finals series, the format of the series was altered, with two elimination finals (3rd vs 6th and 4th vs 5th) held in the first week, followed by the preliminary finals hosted by the top two teams in the second week (1st vs lowest-ranked elimination finals winner and 2nd vs highest-ranked elimination finals winner), and the grand final between the two preliminary finals winners in the third week.

=== Broadcast arrangements ===
As per previous seasons, each VFLW game was made available for live streaming on the AFL website and official app. In addition, expansion side Tasmania had their first six home matches broadcast on the Seven Network and their streaming platform 7plus, marking the first occasion that VFLW games (outside of past grand finals) have been broadcast on free-to-air television.

== Clubs ==
=== Venues and affiliations ===
Club	Home venue(s)	Capacity	AFLW affiliation
Box Hill	Box Hill City Oval	10,000	Hawthorn
Carlton	IKON Park	13,000	Carlton
Casey	Casey Fields	9,000	Melbourne
Collingwood	Victoria Park	10,000	Collingwood
Darebin	Preston City Oval	5,000	—N/a
Essendon	NEC Hangar	3,500	Essendon
Essendon	Windy Hill	10,000	Essendon
Geelong Cats	Deakin University	10,000	Geelong
North Melbourne Werribee	Arden Street Oval	4,000	North Melbourne
North Melbourne Werribee	Avalon Airport Oval	8,000	North Melbourne
Port Melbourne	ETU Stadium	6,000	—N/a
Sandringham	WS Trevor Barker Beach Oval	6,000	St Kilda
Tasmania	North Hobart Oval	11,135	—N/a
Tasmania	UTAS Stadium	17,000	—N/a
Tasmania	Dial Park	3,000	—N/a
Western Bulldogs	Mission Whitten Oval	10,000	Western Bulldogs
Williamstown	DSV Stadium	6,000	—N/a

=== Coach appointments ===
Incomplete list

New coach	Club	Date of appointment	Previous coach	Ref
Georgia Walker	Tasmania	24 November 2025	N/A	

== Home-and-away season ==
=== Round 1 ===
	Round 1
Saturday, 16 May (11:05am)	Darebin 5.3 (33)	def. by	Carlton 7.8 (50)	Preston City Oval	Report
Saturday, 16 May (11:35am)	Port Melbourne 2.6 (18)	def. by	North Melbourne Werribee 8.14 (62)	ETU Stadium	Report
Saturday, 16 May (12:05pm)	Sandringham 6.5 (41)	def.	Essendon 5.8 (38)	Trevor Barker Beach Oval	Report
Saturday, 16 May (12:05pm)	Geelong Cats 3.2 (20)	def. by	Williamstown 12.3 (75)	Deakin University	Report
Saturday, 16 May (12:05pm)	Tasmania 4.5 (29)	def. by	Casey 8.6 (54)	North Hobart Oval	Report
Saturday, 16 May (4:05pm)	Box Hill 5.7 (37)	def. by	Collingwood 9.10 (64)	Box Hill City Oval	Report
	Bye; Western Bulldogs

=== Round 2 ===
	Round 2
Saturday, 23 May (11:05am)	Sandringham 3.8 (26)	def. by	Collingwood 3.9 (27)	Trevor Barker Beach Oval	Report
Saturday, 23 May (11:05am)	Carlton 6.4 (40)	def. by	North Melbourne Werribee 11.6 (72)	Ikon Park	Report
Saturday, 23 May (1:05pm)	Williamstown 3.8 (26)	def. by	Box Hill 4.3 (27)	DSV Stadium	Report
Saturday, 23 May (1:30pm)	Port Melbourne 5.5 (35)	def.	Darebin 5.2 (32)	ETU Stadium	Report
Saturday, 23 May (12:05pm)	Essendon 0.12 (12)	def. by	Geelong Cats 4.8 (32)	Windy Hill	Report
Sunday, 24 May (2:30pm)	Casey 3.0 (18)	def. by	Western Bulldogs 6.5 (41)	Casey Fields	Report
	Bye; Tasmania

=== Round 3 ===
	Round 3
Saturday, 30 May (11:05am)	Essendon 2.4 (16)	def. by	Williamstown 9.15 (69)	Windy Hill	Report
Saturday, 30 May (11:35am)	Western Bulldogs 0.2 (2)	def. by	Collingwood 13.7 (85)	Mission Whitten Oval	Report
Saturday, 30 May (12:05pm)	Geelong Cats 3.7 (25)	def. by	Box Hill 7.5 (47)	Deakin University	Report
Saturday, 30 May (2:05pm)	North Melbourne Werribee 8.14 (62)	def.	Darebin 4.4 (28)	Arden Street Oval	Report
Saturday, 30 May (3:35pm)	Carlton 5.6 (36)	def.	Sandringham 3.6 (24)	Ikon Park	Report
Sunday, 31 May (2:30pm)	Port Melbourne 11.6 (72)	def.	Tasmania 7.5 (47)	ETU Stadium	Report
	Bye; Casey

=== Round 4 ===
	Round 4
Saturday, 6 June (11:05am)	Sandringham 6.4 (41)	def.	Geelong Cats 2.7 (19)	Trevor Barker Beach Oval	Report
Saturday, 6 June (11:05am)	Darebin 2.4 (16)	def. by	Western Bulldogs 4.5 (29)	Mission Whitten Oval	Report
Saturday, 6 June (1:05pm)	Collingwood 11.8 (74)	def.	Casey 1.2 (8)	KGM Centre	Report
Saturday, 6 June (1:35pm)	Tasmania 5.1 (31)	def. by	North Melbourne Werribee 15.11 (101)	North Hobart Oval	Report
Sunday, 7 June (11:05am)	Essendon 10.3 (63)	def.	Carlton 4.7 (31)	Windy Hill	Report
Sunday, 7 June (11:30am)	Port Melbourne 0.9 (9)	def. by	Williamstown 7.8 (50)	ETU Stadium	Report
	Bye; Box Hill
Darebin v Western Bulldogs was moved to the Bulldogs' home ground, Mission Whitten Oval, because of damage to the playing surface at Preston City Oval.; Collingwood v Casey was moved to the KGM Centre due to rain affecting the playing surface at Victoria Park.

=== Round 5 ===
	Round 5
Friday, 12 June (7:35pm)	Western Bulldogs 4.5 (29)	def. by	Geelong Cats 4.6 (30)	Mission Whitten Oval	Report
Saturday, 13 June (11:05am)	Box Hill 2.6 (18)	def. by	North Melbourne Werribee 11.10 (76)	Box Hill City Oval	Report
Saturday, 13 June (3:35pm)	Tasmania 2.2 (14)	def. by	Darebin 7.5 (47)	UTAS Stadium	Report
Saturday, 13 June (4:35pm)	Williamstown 5.9 (39)	def.	Sandringham 1.0 (6)	DSV Stadium	Report
Sunday, 14 June (11:05am)	Casey 4.2 (26)	def. by	Essendon 10.2 (62)	Casey Fields	Report
	Bye; Carlton, Collingwood, Port Melbourne

=== Round 6 ===
	Round 6
Saturday, 20 June (11:05am)	Essendon 2.2 (14)	def. by	Collingwood 10.7 (67)	Windy Hill	Report
Saturday, 20 June (11:05am)	Carlton 3.5 (23)	def. by	Port Melbourne 6.6 (42)	Ikon Park	Report
Saturday, 20 June (11:35am)	Western Bulldogs 6.8 (44)	def.	Box Hill 4.4 (28)	Mission Whitten Oval	Report
Saturday, 20 June (12:05pm)	Geelong Cats 4.1 (25)	def.	Darebin 1.1 (7)	Deakin University	Report
Saturday, 20 June (4:15pm)	Williamstown 7.8 (50)	def.	Casey 1.2 (8)	DSV Stadium	Report
Sunday, 21 June (10:05am)	Sandringham 2.6 (18)	def. by	Tasmania 6.7 (43)	Trevor Barker Beach Oval	Report
	Bye; North Melbourne Werribee

=== Round 7 ===
	Round 7
Saturday, 27 June (9:00am)	Collingwood 6.11 (47)	def.	Tasmania 3.2 (20)	La Trobe Sports Park	Report
Saturday, 27 June (10:35am)	Darebin 3.1 (19)	def. by	Williamstown 5.7 (37)	Preston City Oval	Report
Saturday, 27 June (3:05pm)	North Melbourne Werribee 11.8 (74)	def.	Essendon 7.2 (44)	Arden Street Oval	Report
Saturday, 27 June (3:35pm)	Box Hill 5.2 (32)	def. by	Sandringham 6.10 (46)	Box Hill City Oval	Report
Saturday, 27 June (5:00pm)	Carlton 14.12 (96)	def.	Casey 2.1 (13)	Ikon Park	Report
Sunday, 28 June (11:30am)	Port Melbourne 5.4 (34)	def. by	Western Bulldogs 5.6 (36)	ETU Stadium	Report
	Bye; Geelong Cats

=== Round 8 ===
	Round 8
Saturday, 4 July (9:05am)	Tasmania 6.4 (40)	def.	Box Hill 5.1 (31)	Dial Park	Report
Saturday, 4 July (10:05am)	Williamstown 6.6 (42)	def.	Western Bulldogs 4.1 (25)	DSV Stadium	Report
Saturday, 4 July (2:00pm)	Collingwood 4.6 (30)	def.	Carlton 3.8 (26)	Highgate Recreation Reserve	Report
Saturday, 4 July (2:30pm)	North Melbourne Werribee 14.11 (95)	def.	Geelong Cats 3.3 (21)	Avalon Airport Oval	Report
Sunday, 5 July (11:00am)	Casey 1.1 (7)	def. by	Port Melbourne 7.6 (48)	Casey Fields	Report
	Bye; Darebin, Essendon, Sandringham

=== Round 9 ===
	Round 9
Friday, 10 July (7:35pm)	Western Bulldogs 5.2 (32)	def.	Essendon 3.4 (22)	Mission Whitten Oval	Report
Saturday, 11 July (10:05pm)	Box Hill 4.11 (35)	def. by	Carlton 10.11 (71)	Box Hill City Oval	Report
Saturday, 11 July (11:00am)	Collingwood 5.4 (34)	def. by	North Melbourne Werribee 5.7 (37)	La Trobe Sports Park	Report
Saturday, 11 July (2:05pm)	Tasmania 5.7 (37)	def.	Geelong Cats 1.7 (13)	North Hobart Oval	Report
Sunday, 12 July (11:05am)	Darebin 5.8 (38)	def.	Casey 4.8 (32)	Preston City Oval	Report
Sunday, 12 July (11:30am)	Port Melbourne 6.11 (47)	def.	Sandringham 5.4 (34)	ETU Stadium	Report
	Bye; Williamstown

=== Round 10 ===
	Round 10
Saturday, 18 July (10:05am)	Williamstown 5.4 (34)	def.	Tasmania 3.2 (20)	DSV Stadium	Report
Saturday, 18 July (11:00am)	North Melbourne Werribee 11.11 (77)	def.	Casey 1.4 (10)	ETU Stadium	Report
Saturday, 18 July (11:05am)	Essendon 2.6 (18)	def. by	Port Melbourne 6.12 (48)	Windy Hill	Report
Saturday, 18 July (12:00pm)	Collingwood 10.10 (70)	def.	Box Hill 3.5 (23)	Box Hill City Oval	Report
Saturday, 18 July (12:05pm)	Geelong Cats 4.2 (26)	def. by	Carlton 10.8 (68)	Deakin University	Report
Saturday, 18 July (3:00pm)	Sandringham 5.3 (33)	def. by	Darebin 5.7 (37)	Wilson Storage Trevor Barker Beach Oval	Report
	Bye; Western Bulldogs

=== Round 11 ===
	Round 11
Saturday, 25 July (11:05am)	Western Bulldogs 5.5 (35)	def.	Sandringham 5.2 (32)	Mission Whitten Oval	Report
Saturday, 25 July (1:00pm)	Collingwood 7.11 (53)	def.	Darebin 0.0 (0)	Preston City Oval	Report
Saturday, 25 July (2:00pm)	Carlton 6.6 (42)	def.	Williamstown 4.8 (32)	Ikon Park	Report
Saturday, 25 July (3:30pm)	Casey 2.3 (15)	def. by	Geelong Cats 7.5 (47)	Casey Fields	Report
Saturday, 25 July (3:35pm)	Box Hill 0.5 (5)	def. by	Essendon 5.14 (44)	Kennedy Community Centre	Report
	Bye; North Melbourne Werribee, Port Melbourne, Tasmania

=== Round 12 ===
	Round 12
Saturday, 1 August (11:05am)	Darebin 0.7 (7)	def. by	Port Melbourne 4.8 (32)	Preston City Oval	Report
Saturday, 1 August (12:05pm)	Casey 1.2 (8)	def. by	Carlton 4.12 (36)	Casey Fields	Report
Saturday, 1 August (12:05pm)	Geelong Cats 4.3 (27)	def.	Collingwood 2.6 (18)	Deakin University	Report
Saturday, 1 August (1:05pm)	Essendon 2.7 (19)	def. by	Tasmania 9.5 (59)	Windy Hill	Report
Saturday, 1 August (3:30pm)	North Melbourne Werribee 5.3 (33)	def. by	Western Bulldogs 5.4 (34)	Avalon Airport Oval	Report
Sunday, 2 August (10:00am)	Sandringham 4.4 (28)	def. by	Williamstown 6.11 (47)	Wilson Storage Trevor Barker Beach Oval	Report
	Bye; Box Hill

=== Round 13 ===
	Round 13
Saturday, 8 August (11:05am)	Western Bulldogs 6.5 (41)	def. by	Port Melbourne 6.6 (42)	Mission Whitten Oval	Report
Saturday, 8 August (12:05pm)	Sandringham 6.5 (41)	def. by	North Melbourne Werribee 12.7 (79)	Wilson Storage Trevor Barker Beach Oval	Report
Saturday, 8 August (2:35pm)	Tasmania 7.4 (46)	def. by	Carlton 9.7 (61)	North Hobart Oval	Report
Sunday, 9 August (10:35am)	Williamstown 11.7 (73)	def.	Essendon 1.2 (8)	DSV Stadium	Report
Sunday, 9 August (11:05am)	Darebin 3.5 (23)	def. by	Box Hill 6.6 (42)	Preston City Oval	Report
	Bye; Casey, Collingwood, Geelong Cats

=== Round 14 ===
	Round 14
Saturday, 15 August (9:35am)	Williamstown 9.4 (58)	def.	North Melbourne Werribee 3.3 (21)	DSV Stadium	Report
Saturday, 15 August (10:05am)	Box Hill 12.6 (78)	def.	Casey 2.5 (17)	Box Hill City Oval	Report
Saturday, 15 August (11:05am)	Essendon 7.7 (49)	def.	Sandringham 5.6 (36)	NEC Hangar	Report
Saturday, 15 August (11:05am)	Port Melbourne 5.5 (35)	def. by	Collingwood 6.1 (37)	ETU Stadium	Report
Sunday, 16 August (10:00am)	Geelong Cats 8.12 (60)	def.	Tasmania 3.0 (18)	Deakin University	Report
Sunday, 16 August (12:05pm)	Carlton 7.5 (47)	def.	Western Bulldogs 5.4 (34)	Ikon Park	Report
	Bye; Darebin

=== Round 15 ===
	Round 15
Saturday, 22 August (10:05am)	Box Hill 2.6 (18)	def. by	Port Melbourne 4.5 (29)	Box Hill City Oval	Report
Saturday, 22 August (10:35am)	North Melbourne Werribee 7.6 (48)	def.	Collingwood 6.6 (42)	Arden Street Oval	Report
Saturday, 22 August (11:05am)	Western Bulldogs 14.7 (91)	def.	Darebin 2.4 (16)	Preston City Oval	Report
Saturday, 22 August (12:05pm)	Carlton 3.6 (24)	def. by	Geelong Cats 3.9 (27)	Ikon Park	Report
Sunday, 23 August (11:35am)	Casey 4.3 (27)	def. by	Tasmania 7.8 (50)	Casey Fields	Report
	Bye; Essendon, Sandringham, Williamstown

=== Round 16 ===
	Round 16
Saturday, 29 August (9:35am)	Tasmania 6.6 (42)	def. by	Western Bulldogs 10.5 (65)	Windsor Park	Report
Saturday, 29 August (10:00am)	Collingwood 3.4 (22)	def. by	Williamstown 9.5 (59)	DSV Stadium	Report
Saturday, 29 August (10:05am)	North Melbourne Werribee 11.2 (68)	def.	Box Hill 5.8 (38)	Arden Street Oval	Report
Saturday, 29 August (11:05am)	Darebin 4.8 (32)	drew with	Essendon 4.8 (32)	Preston City Oval	Report
Saturday, 29 August (12:05pm)	Geelong Cats 5.8 (38)	def.	Port Melbourne 5.4 (34)	Deakin University	Repor
Sunday, 30 August (10:05am)	Casey 5.4 (34)	def. by	Sandringham 12.8 (80)	Casey Fields	Report
	Bye; Carlton

== Ladder ==
Pos	Team	Pld	W	L	D	PF	PA	PP	Pts	Qualification
1	Williamstown	14	12	2	0	691	271	255.0	48	Finals series
2	North Melbourne Werribee	14	12	2	0	905	457	198.0	48	Finals series
3	Collingwood	14	10	4	0	670	362	185.1	40	Finals series
4	Carlton	14	9	5	0	651	485	134.2	36	Finals series
5	Port Melbourne	14	9	5	0	525	450	116.7	36	Finals series
6	Western Bulldogs	14	9	5	0	538	487	110.5	36	Finals series
7	Geelong Cats	14	8	6	0	416	520	80.0	32	
8	Tasmania	14	5	9	0	496	649	76.4	20	
9	Essendon	14	4	9	1	441	625	70.6	18	
10	Sandringham	14	4	10	0	486	562	86.5	16	
11	Box Hill	14	4	10	0	459	643	71.4	16	
12	Darebin	14	3	10	1	336	573	58.6	14	
13	Casey	14	1	13	0	277	807	34.3	4	

Source: AFL.com.au
Rules for classification: 1) points; 2) percentage; 3) number of points for.

== Finals series ==
=== Elimination finals ===
	Elimation finals
Saturday, 5 September (1:05pm)	Carlton 5.5 (35)	def. by	Port Melbourne 6.9 (45)	Ikon Park	Report
Sunday, 6 September (10:05am)	Collingwood 6.2 (38)	def.	Western Bulldogs 5.7 (37)	Victoria Park	Report

=== Preliminary finals ===
	Preliminary finals
Saturday, 12 September (11:35am)	North Melbourne Werribee 12.5 (77)	def.	Collingwood 2.4 (16)	Arden Street Oval	Report
Saturday, 12 September (1:35pm)	Williamstown 6.4 (40)	def.	Port Melbourne 5.8 (38)	DSV Stadium	Report

=== Grand Final ===
2026 VFLW Grand Final
Sunday, 20 September (11:00am)	Williamstown	def. by	North Melbourne Werribee	Ikon Park
0.1 (1); 0.3 (3); 1.3 (9); 1.6 (12)	Q1; Q2; Q3; Final	1.1 (7); 2.1 (13); 3.1 (19); 4.1 (25)	Lisa Hardeman Medal: Alana Barba (North Melbourne Werribee); Television broadcast: AFL.com.au
Eaves	Goals	Torpey, Tierney, Reid, Barba
Eaves, Smith, Smith Williams, Hung	Best	Barba, Reid, Tierney, Torpey

== Awards ==
- Lambert–Pearce Medal (league best and fairest): Emily Eaves (Williamstown) – 21 votes
- Rohenna Young Medal (leading goalkicker): Mia Zielinski (Williamstown) – 32 goals
- Debbie Lee Medal (rising star): Stella Huxtable (Collingwood)
- Coaches MVP: Ava Seton (North Melbourne Werribee) – 76 votes

=== Team of the Year ===
2026 VFL Women's Team of the Year
B:	Lucy Burke (Carlton)	Laura Blue (Williamstown)	
HB:	Annie Lee (Geelong Cats)	Annabelle Embelton (Box Hill)	Naomi Ferres (Williamstown)
C:	Ava Seton (North Melbourne Werribee)	Alana Barba (North Melbourne Werribee) (c)	Jorja Livingstone (Western Bulldogs)
HF:	Grace White (Tasmania)	Nell Morris-Dalton (Carlton)	Dominque Carbone (Collingwood)
F:	Amelia Peck (Port Melbourne)	Mia Zielinski (Williamstown)	
Foll:	Georgia Howes (Williamstown)	Emily Eaves (Williamstown)	Hannah Scott (Carlton)
Int:	Maddie Di Cosmo (North Melbourne Werribee)	Octavia Di Donato (Carlton)	Stella Huxtable (Collingwood)
Int:	Kayley Kavanagh (Box Hill)	Renee Tierney (North Melbourne Werribee)	
Coach:	Paul Groves (Williamstown)		

=== Club best and fairest ===
Club	Winner	Ref
Box Hill	Kayley Kavanagh	
Carlton	Hannah Scott	
Carlton	Octavia Di Donato	
Casey	Meg MacDonald	
Collingwood	Dominique Carbone	
Darebin		
Essendon	El Chaston	
Essendon	Ashlea Melnikas	
Geelong Cats	Lucy Marescuk	
North Melbourne Werribee		
Port Melbourne	Georgia Foran	
Sandringham	Charlotte Taylor	
Western Bulldogs	Ellie Bishop	
Williamstown	Emily Eaves	

== Representative match ==
For the second consecutive season, an interstate representative match was arranged against the SANFL Women's League (SANFLW). As was the case with the 2025 fixture, the match was timed to coincide with the AFL's Gather Round fixtures in Adelaide. The match was held as part of a double-header with the equivalent men's interstate match.

2026 State Game
Saturday, 11 April (12:00 ACST)	SANFLW	def.	VFLW	Stratarama Stadium
0.0 (0); 1.2 (8); 2.3 (15); 3.4 (22)	Q1; Q2; Q3; Final	0.4 (4); 1.5 (11); 1.7 (13); 2.8 (20)	SANFLW Best on ground & VFLW Best on ground: Mikaylah Antony (SANFLW) & Dom Carbone (VFLW); Television broadcast: AFL.com.au
Anderson, Lee, O'Neill 1	Goals	Reid, Sanger 1
Antony, Venning, Tentye, Moon, King	Best	Carbone, Chaston, Reid, Thorne, Sanger

2026 VFLW State Team
B:	21. Gabbi Featherston; (Tasmania)	25. Ellyse Gamble; (North Melbourne Werribee)	
HB:	26. El Chaston; (Essendon)	8. Lauren Caruso; (Port Melbourne)	15. Sarah Sansonetti; (Western Bulldogs)
C:	5. Charlotte Ryan; (North Melbourne Werribee)	13. Maddie Di Cosmo; (North Melbourne Werribee)	1. Lulu Beatty; (Darebin)
HF:	12. Courtney Jones; (Port Melbourne)	9. Caitlin Thorne; (Box Hill)	2. Emily Elkington; (Carlton)
F:	28. Amelia Peck; (Collingwood)	23. Renee Tierney (c); (North Melbourne Werribee)	
Foll:	27. Paige Price; (Box Hill)	11. Alana Barba; (North Melbourne Werribee)	7. Dom Carbone; (Collingwood)
Int:	6. Stasia Stevenson; (Box Hill)	4. Kayley Kavanagh; (Box Hill)	17. Stella Reid; (North Melbourne Werribee)
Int:	24. Hayley Peck; (Geelong Cats)	14. Matilda Van Berkel; (Box Hill)	18. Tahlia Sanger; (Collingwood)
Coach:	Brett Gourley (North Melbourne Werribee)		
Emg:	Keely Fullerton (Port Melbourne)		

== See also ==
- 2026 VFL season
