= Angie Muller =

Australian rules footballer, born 1912

Personal information
- Full name: Angus Alan Muller
- Born: 13 November 1912; Ballarat East, Victoria
- Died: 18 August 1966 (aged 53); Fitzroy, Victoria
- Original team: North Geelong
- Height: 175 cm (5 ft 9 in)
- Weight: 82 kg (181 lb)
- Position: Wingman

Playing career^{1}
Years	Club	Games (Goals)
1933–41	Geelong	115 (37)
1942	Fitzroy	1 (1)
Total		116 (38)
- ^{1} Playing statistics correct to the end of 1942.

Angus Alan Muller (13 November 1912 – 18 August 1966) was an Australian rules footballer who played with Geelong and Fitzroy in the Victorian Football League (VFL).

Muller was recruited locally, from North Geelong, and made his league debut in 1933. The following season he had his best year, claiming nine Brownlow Medal votes to finish as the top placed Geelong player. In the 1937 VFL season, Muller appeared in 13 successive wins, the last of which came in the Grand Final where he managed 28 effective disposals and claimed six marks.

A left footer, he was used mainly on the wing but could also play as a centreman, rover and half forward flanker. He is credited as the 4000th player to appear in the VFL and represented the league at interstate football on four occasions.

His brothers, Jack Muller and Nick Muller, also played for Geelong.
