= Wally Southern =

Australian rules footballer

Personal information
- Full name: John Wallace Southern
- Born: 26 October 1921; Carlton North, Victoria
- Died: 8 March 2003 (aged 81)
- Original team: North Geelong (GDFA)
- Height: 178 cm (5 ft 10 in)
- Weight: 74 kg (163 lb)

Playing career^{1}
Years	Club	Games (Goals)
1941	Geelong	1 (0)
1943	South Melbourne	1 (0)
1944–1945	Geelong	25 (11)
1946	St Kilda	4 (2)
Total		31 (13)
- ^{1} Playing statistics correct to the end of 1946.

John Wallace "Wally" Southern (26 October 1921 – 8 March 2003) was an Australian rules footballer who played with Geelong, South Melbourne and St Kilda in the Victorian Football League (VFL).

Southern came to the VFL from North Geelong. He made one appearance for Geelong in the 1941 VFL season and also played a single game for South Melbourne in the 1943 season. In 1944 he went back to Geelong and got to play a full season, missing only one game all year. He spent one more season at Geelong, and then went to St Kilda in 1946, where he played four games. After moving to Adelaide in 1948, Southern began playing for Sturt. He initially played seniors, and then captained their B Grade team and in 1952 won the B Grade Magarey Medal.
