= Harold Manson =

Australian rules footballer

Personal information
- Full name: Harold Albert Manson
- Born: 17 May 1894; Warrnambool, Victoria
- Died: 23 April 1963 (aged 68); Fawkner, Victoria
- Original team: Warrnambool / North Geelong

Playing career^{1}
Years	Club	Games (Goals)
1915	St Kilda	8 (0)
1921	Geelong	1 (0)
Total		9 (0)
- ^{1} Playing statistics correct to the end of 1921.

Harold Albert Manson (17 May 1894 – 23 April 1963) was an Australian rules footballer who played with St Kilda and Geelong in the Victorian Football League (VFL).
