= Vic Taylor (footballer) =

Australian rules footballer (1922–2015)

Personal information
- Full name: Victor Douglas Taylor
- Born: 23 October 1922; Fyansford, Victoria
- Died: 12 April 2015 (aged 92)
- Original team: North Geelong
- Height: 183 cm (6 ft 0 in)
- Weight: 83 kg (183 lb)

Playing career^{1}
Years	Club	Games (Goals)
1944	Geelong	2 (0)
- ^{1} Playing statistics correct to the end of 1944.

Victor Douglas Taylor (23 October 1922 – 12 April 2015) was an Australian rules footballer who played with Geelong in the Victorian Football League (VFL).
