= Billy Gallagher (footballer) =

Australian rules footballer

Personal information
- Full name: William Edward Gallagher
- Born: 11 August 1885; Charlton, Victoria
- Died: 11 October 1959 (aged 74); Geelong, Victoria
- Original team: North Geelong

Playing career^{1}
Years	Club	Games (Goals)
1906	Geelong	4 (1)
- ^{1} Playing statistics correct to the end of 1906.

William Edward Gallagher (11 August 1885 – 11 October 1959) was an Australian rules footballer who played with Geelong in the Victorian Football League (VFL).
