= Jack Mullane =

Australian rules footballer

Personal information
- Full name: John William Mullane
- Born: 13 July 1922; Ballan, Victoria
- Died: 21 June 2015 (aged 92)
- Original team: North Geelong
- Height: 173 cm (5 ft 8 in)
- Weight: 70 kg (154 lb)

Playing career^{1}
Years	Club	Games (Goals)
1947–48	South Melbourne	12 (0)
- ^{1} Playing statistics correct to the end of 1948.

Jack Mullane (13 July 1922 – 21 June 2015) was an Australian rules footballer who played with South Melbourne in the Victorian Football League (VFL).

Prior to playing with South Melbourne, Mullane served in the Australian Army during World War II.
