= Gordon Hynes (footballer) =

Australian rules footballer and coach

Personal information
- Born: 6 November 1944 (age 81)
- Original team: North Geelong (GDFL)
- Height: 177 cm (5 ft 10 in)
- Weight: 77 kg (170 lb)

Playing career^{1}
Years	Club	Games (Goals)
1963–1969	Geelong	61 (52)
1970–1972	North Geelong	
1973–1981	North Shore	167
- ^{1} Playing statistics correct to the end of 1981.

Gordon James Hynes OAM (born 6 November 1944) is a former Australian rules footballer who played with Geelong in the VFL during the 1960s.

Hynes made his league debut in the 1963 season and ended the year as a Geelong premiership player, kicking 3 goals in the grand final. One year earlier Hynes played in Geelong's Under 19's premiership side.

After retiring from the VFL at 24 years of age, he returned to North Shore in the Geelong Football League, where he coached the Seagulls for 12 seasons between 1973 and 1984, 11 of them as playing coach, winning six premierships, the club's senior best and fairest award seven times and the league best and fairest in 1978.

== Playing Achievements ==
=== Premierships ===
Geelong Under 19's: 1962

Geelong: (VFL/AFL) 1963

North Shore: (GDFL) 1974, 1976, 1977. (GFL) 1980, 1981.

=== Best & Fairest's ===
Geelong Under 19's: 1962

North Geelong: 1971, 1972.

North Shore: 1973, 1974, 1975, 1976, 1977, 1978, 1979.

Geelong & District Football League: 1978

== Coaching Achievements ==
=== Premierships ===
North Shore: (GDFL) 1974, 1976, 1977. (GFL) 1980, 1981, 1983.
