= Max Atkin =

Australian rules footballer

Personal information
- Full name: Maxwell Lloyd Atkin
- Born: 9 November 1924
- Died: 15 December 2001 (aged 77)
- Original team: North Geelong
- Height: 178 cm (5 ft 10 in)
- Weight: 77 kg (170 lb)

Playing career^{1}
Years	Club	Games (Goals)
1944–45	Geelong	5 (0)
- ^{1} Playing statistics correct to the end of 1945.

Maxwell Lloyd Atkin (9 November 1924 – 15 December 2001) was an Australian rules footballer who played with Geelong in the Victorian Football League (VFL).
