= Dale Mather =

Australian rules footballer

Personal information
- Full name: Dale Alexander Mather
- Born: 11 November 1940
- Original team: North Geelong
- Height: 175 cm (5 ft 9 in)
- Weight: 73 kg (161 lb)

Playing career^{1}
Years	Club	Games (Goals)
1959–61	Geelong	12 (0)
- ^{1} Playing statistics correct to the end of 1961.

Dale Alexander Mather (born 11 November 1940) is a former Australian rules footballer who played with Geelong in the Victorian Football League (VFL).
