= Dial Regional Sports Complex =

Multi-sports complex in Penguin, Tasmania

Dial Sports Complex
- Interactive map of Dial Sports Complex
- Address: 1 Dial Park Dr; Penguin, Tasmania
- Coordinates: 41°7′36″S 146°4′21″E
- Owner: Central Coast Council
- Operator: Central Coast Council
- Capacity: 3,000 (200 seated)
- Record attendance: 2,800 (Tasmania vs Box Hill, 4 July 2026)
- Field size: 160 m × 135 m (525 ft × 443 ft)

Construction
- Opened: 31 March 2018; 8 years ago

Tenants
- Penguin Football Club (2018–); Penguin Cricket Club (2018–); Tasmania Football Club (2026–)

The Dial Regional Sports Complex (also referred to as Dial Park) is a multi-sports complex located in the Tasmanian north coast town of Penguin. It includes two ovals (known as Oval A and Oval B) which host Australian rules football and cricket matches, along with courts for tennis, netball and basketball, and a wider public park.

It is the home of the Penguin Football Club in the North West Football League (NWFL) and the Penguin Cricket Club in the Mersey Valley Cricket Association (MVCA). The Tasmania Football Club will host AFL Women's (AFLW), Victorian Football League (VFL) and VFL Women's (VFLW) matches at the venue.

== History ==
Work on the Dial Regional Sports Complex Master Plan began in 2016, with a plan to construct two ovals and other facilities at the site of the existing Dial Regional Sports Centre. The Central Coast Council announced that the Penguin Football Club and the Penguin Cricket Club would be relocated from the Penguin Recreation Ground, located approximately 2.3 kilometres (1.4 miles) away, to the new venue. The project also examined whether to move the Cuprona Football Club from the Heybridge Recreation Ground, although this did not eventuate.

Construction on the project continued throughout 2017, with Penguin playing its final North West Football League (NWFL) match at Penguin Recreation Ground in August 2017. The ground was later removed, with plans for it to be developed into housing.

The new venue officially opened at 1:30pm on 31 March 2018 for its first NWFL match, which saw Burnie defeat Penguin by 103 points.

In 2022, the Tasmanian Government committed A$25 million for infrastructure upgrades at the venue, including bringing both ovals up to Australian Football League (AFL) Tier 4 standard, which would allow it to host AFL Women's (AFLW) and pre-season matches. The funding was reduced to A$13.5 million in March 2025, which meant that Oval B would not be included in the upgrades, while it was announced at the same time that a proposed ownership transfer from Central Coast Council to Stadiums Tasmania would not take place.

On 4 July 2026, Dial Regional Sports Complex hosted its first Victorian Football League (VFL) and VFL Women's (VFLW) matches, when Tasmania played the Box Hill Hawks in a double-header.
