= Box Hill City Oval =

Sports venue in Box Hill, Victoria

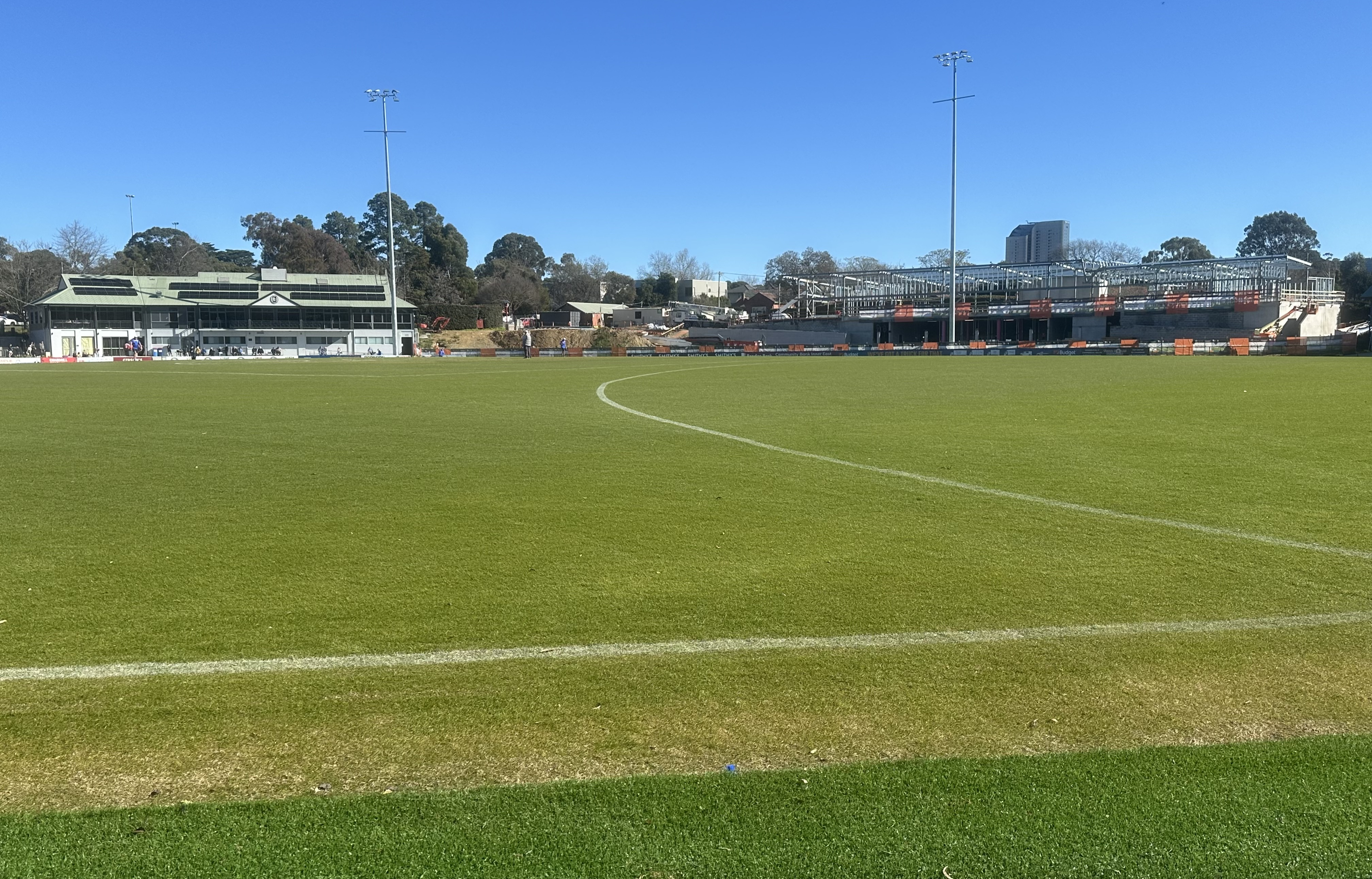
- Box Hill City Oval in August 2026
- Interactive map of Box Hill City Oval
- Former names: Fenjiu Stadium (2024)
- Address: Cnr Whitehorse & Middleborough Rds; Box Hill, Victoria
- Coordinates: 37°49′8″S 145°8′15″E
- Owner: City of Whitehorse
- Capacity: 6,000 (500 seated)
- Field size: 169 metres × 151 metres
- Public transit: ● ● Laburnum

Construction
- Opened: 1937; 89 years ago

Tenants
- Box Hill Hawks (VFL/VFLW); Box Hill Cricket Club (VSDCA)

Box Hill City Oval (BHCO) is an Australian rules football and cricket venue located in the Melbourne suburb of Box Hill.

It is the home of the Box Hill Hawks, which plays in the Victorian Football League (VFL) and VFL Women's (VFLW) competitions, and the Box Hill Cricket Club, which plays in the Victorian Sub-District Cricket Association (VSDCA).

== History ==
Box Hill City Oval was officially opened in 1937. The capacity of the venue is approximately 10,000 people. The largest official attendance at the ground was on 14 August 1983 when 6,200 people attended a VFA game between Box Hill and Oakleigh.

On Melbourne Show Day 1953, the venue hosted a benefit game for the family of Ray Gibb, who had died in an accident in early September, between a combined Hawthorn–Richmond team and a Box Hill team augmented with VFL and VFA stars; the crowd at the time was estimated to be 6,000. The venue has two pavilions and terracing on the western wing, but no grandstand.

A crowd of 5,253 people attended a match between Box Hill and Williamstown during the 2005 VFL season, which was the largest attendance at the ground since the 1980s.

It has previously served as the second-choice venue, behind North Port Oval, for VFL finals; it usually hosts finals only in the first week, but also hosted the preliminary finals in 2010 when the North Port Oval surface was unplayable due to rain and overuse.

The Hawthorn AFLW team's first two AFLW home matches on 4 September 2022 and 17 September 2022 were played at the Box Hill City Oval, with the matches attracting crowds of 2262 and 1108 respectively.

In March 2024, Box Hill Hawks announced a three-year partnership with Fuja Fenjiu and renamed the stadium as Fenjiu Stadium for the duration of the partnership.

== Major milestones ==
1937	Ground opened. Main pavilion constructed.
1951	Box Hill Football Club admitted to VFA. Major improvements including committee rooms, kiosk and scoreboard added.
1970	Coterie room constructed.
1976	Social rooms built in main pavilion.
1983	Present scoreboard constructed.
1989	Playing surface relaid. Present kiosk constructed.
1994	Committee rooms and coterie room joined to form President's Room.
1998	Whitehorse Council acquired 4 remaining houses adjacent to ground. Areas converted into public car parking.
2001	"Federation Gates" constructed
2002	Box Hill Hawks players rooms and administration office constructed
2007	"Barbara and Ron Gibbs Entrance" opened. Cricket practice wickets removed from playing arena.
2009	"South Pavilion" opened (second storey to players rooms and administration office constructed in 2002).
2012	New coaches boxes constructed. Major refurbishment of North Pavilion completed.
2016	Existing scoreboard (built 1983) upgraded to LED display.
