= Alex Perry (Australian footballer) =

Australian rules footballer

Personal information
- Full name: Alex Perry
- Born: 29 July 1940 (age 86)
- Original team: North Geelong
- Height: 170 cm (5 ft 7 in)
- Weight: 73 kg (161 lb)

Playing career^{1}
Years	Club	Games (Goals)
1959	Geelong	3 (0)
- ^{1} Playing statistics correct to the end of 1959.

Alex Perry (born 29 July 1940) is a former Australian rules footballer who played for the Geelong Football Club in the Victorian Football League (VFL).
