= Jack Muller (footballer) =

Australian rules footballer

Personal information
- Full name: Jack Muller
- Born: 27 December 1919; Geelong, Victoria
- Died: 26 December 1977 (aged 57); Queensland
- Original team: North Geelong
- Height: 173 cm (5 ft 8 in)
- Weight: 81 kg (179 lb)

Playing career^{1}
Years	Club	Games (Goals)
1945–46	Geelong	21 (25)
- ^{1} Playing statistics correct to the end of 1946.

Jack Muller (27 December 1919 – 26 December 1977) was an Australian rules footballer who played with Geelong in the Victorian Football League (VFL).
