= Deakin University Elite Sports Precinct =

Cricket and Australian rules football Stadium in Victoria, Australia

- Deakin Geelong Stadium
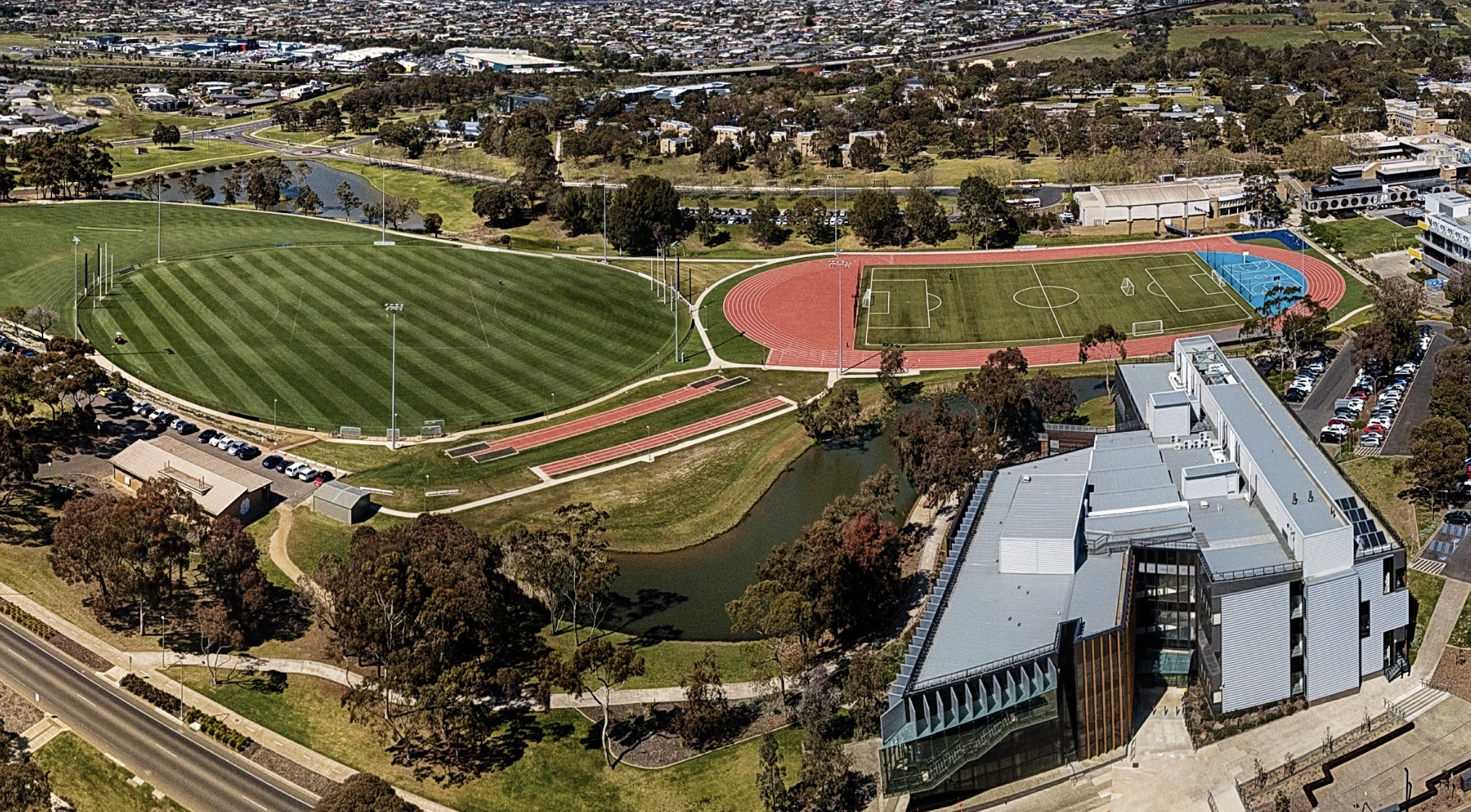
- Interactive map of Deakin University; Elite Sports Precinct
- Location: 75 Pigdons Road, Waurn Ponds, Victoria
- Coordinates: 38°11′49.6″S 144°17′57.13″E
- Owner: Deakin University
- Capacity: 10,000
- Surface: Grass (Football oval); Artificial turf (Soccer pitch)
- Field size: 157 metres × 130 metres (Football oval)

Construction
- Groundbreaking: 12 September 2015
- Opened: 19 May 2016
- Architect: SportENG
- Builders: Pitchcraft; Civilex
- Project manager: SportENG

Tenants
- Geelong Football Club (2016–present); Deakin Ducks Football Club (2016–present)

The Deakin University Elite Sports Precinct is a series of sports venues located on the campus of Deakin University in Waurn Ponds, Victoria. The precinct's Australian rules football oval is used as a training facility by the Geelong Football Club's Australian Football League (AFL) and AFL Women's (AFLW) teams, and as a secondary home ground by its VFL Women's (VFLW) team.

== History ==
Sporting facilities at Deakin University's Waurn Ponds campus were previously limited to a large natural turf playing surface and two dilapidated baseball diamonds. The creation of the precinct was first announced by the university in a media release in September 2015 at a cost of $8.1 million, with construction expected to be completed by April 2016. The total cost grew to $8.4 million by the time of completion. More than 40,000 square metres of turf was brought in from South Australia as part of the project.

The Australian rules football oval was specifically constructed to the exact dimensions of the Melbourne Cricket Ground, allowing the Geelong Football Club to gain vital experience practising on a finals-like venue, as opposed to the narrow playing surface of Kardinia Park. The Cats have used the precinct as an "alternative training base" since its inception.

The first competitive sporting game took part at the precinct in July 2017, when Geelong hosted St Kilda Sharks in round 7 of the 2017 VFL Women's season. The Cats' VFL Women's team played an elimination final at the venue in June 2022.

== Facilities ==
The precinct caters for multiple sports and is used by both professional sporting clubs and community sporting clubs.

It includes:

- An Australian rules football oval, identical in size to the Melbourne Cricket Ground
- A synthetic soccer pitch, constructed to FIFA standards
- An eight-lane 400-metre running track, accredited by World Athletics
- A 50-metre long jump track and sandpits
- A baseball diamond
- Basketball and netball courts
- An outdoor teaching hub.
