= Tasmania Football Club =

Australian rules football club

Names
- Full name: TFC AFL Limited
- Nickname(s): Devils, Tassie

Club details
- Founded: 3 May 2023; 3 years ago
- Colours: Myrtle green; Rose red; Primrose yellow
- Competition: Since 2026: VFL: Senior men; VFLW: Senior women; From 2028: AFL: Senior men; AFLW: Senior women; VFL: Reserves men; VFLW: Reserves women; Talent League: Academy Boys; Talent League Girls: Academy Girls
- Chairperson: Grant O'Brien
- CEO: Brendon Gale
- Coach: AFL: Ken Hinkley; VFL: Jeromey Webberley; VFLW: Georgia Walker
- Captain(s): VFL: Robbie Fox; VFLW: Meghan Gaffney (Note: Meghan Gaffney was named captain ahead of the 2026 VFL Women's season, though she suffered an ACL injury in pre-season which ruled her out from playing for the entire season and the captaincy was filled by Georgia Hill.)
- Premierships: VFL (0); VFLW (0)
- Ground: Bellerive Oval; York Park; Macquarie Point Stadium; Dial Regional Sports Complex; North Hobart Oval
- Training ground: Kingston Twin Ovals

Uniforms
Home (2028–)

Other information
- Official website: devilsfc.com.au

The Tasmania Football Club, nicknamed the Devils, is a professional Australian rules football club expected to compete in the Australian Football League (AFL) and the AFL Women's (AFLW) from the 2028 season. The club is based in Tasmania and will play home matches in Hobart and Launceston, the two largest cities in the state. Both York Park in Launceston and Bellerive Oval in Hobart will host games initially, with Hobart-based matches moving to the yet-to-be-built Macquarie Point Stadium in 2031.

In May 2023, Tasmania secured an AFL licence following a unanimous vote of AFL club presidents. The club commenced playing in the Victorian Football League (VFL) and the VFL Women's (VFLW) in 2026.

== History ==
Tasmania has been a stronghold of Australian rules football since the 1860s. Pictured is the Tasmanian state side that defeated Western Australia at the 1911 Adelaide Carnival.

=== Successful bid and founding ===
Australian rules football has been played in Tasmania since the 1860s and has long been the state's most popular spectator sport. A 2018 study of Internet traffic showed 79% of Tasmanians (424,459) were interested in it, the highest rate in the country, which was, according to Roy Morgan, a figure higher than the number of supporters of around half of existing AFL clubs.

The notion of a Tasmanian team in the VFL/AFL competition had long been suggested, with multiple formal propositions and bids since the 1980s. Successive bids during expansion periods for the competition, in the 1990s and late 2000s, were spurned in favour of Fremantle, Port Adelaide, Gold Coast and Greater Western Sydney.

In 2019, a government-appointed taskforce chaired by Brett Godfrey, with backing from the Tasmanian government and at the advice of the AFL, was set up to commission a business case for a team to be assessed by the league.

By 2021 the state's premier, Peter Gutwein, refused to re-negotiate deals to extend Tasmanian-based AFL premiership matches for Victorian clubs Hawthorn and North Melbourne, without the AFL committing to a timetable for the introduction of a Tasmanian team. An independent review was subsequently overseen by former AFL Commissioner and Geelong Football Club president Colin Carter, and this was publicly released in mid-2021, which concluded a standalone Tasmanian team could be financially viable with the ongoing assistance of government and league funding.

In November 2022, amidst ongoing momentum and public interest throughout the year, an in-principle agreement was reached between the AFL and Tasmanian government, under premier Jeremy Rockliff, on the commercial terms for Tasmania's bid for a 19th licence, which would be awarded to a government-established entity known as the Tasmanian AFL Licence Taskforce. The AFL and club presidents met on 2 May 2023, and provided unanimous support to award the 19th licence to Tasmania. The following day, AFL Chief Executive Officer Gillon McLachlan formally announced the team's admission to the competition at North Hobart Oval, confirming the men's team will join the Australian Football League from the 2028 season.

Following the Tasmanian Parliament's approval of the Macquarie Point Stadium in December 2025, it was confirmed that the club's senior women's team would also compete in the AFL Women's competition from 2028.

=== Competitive debut and list concessions ===
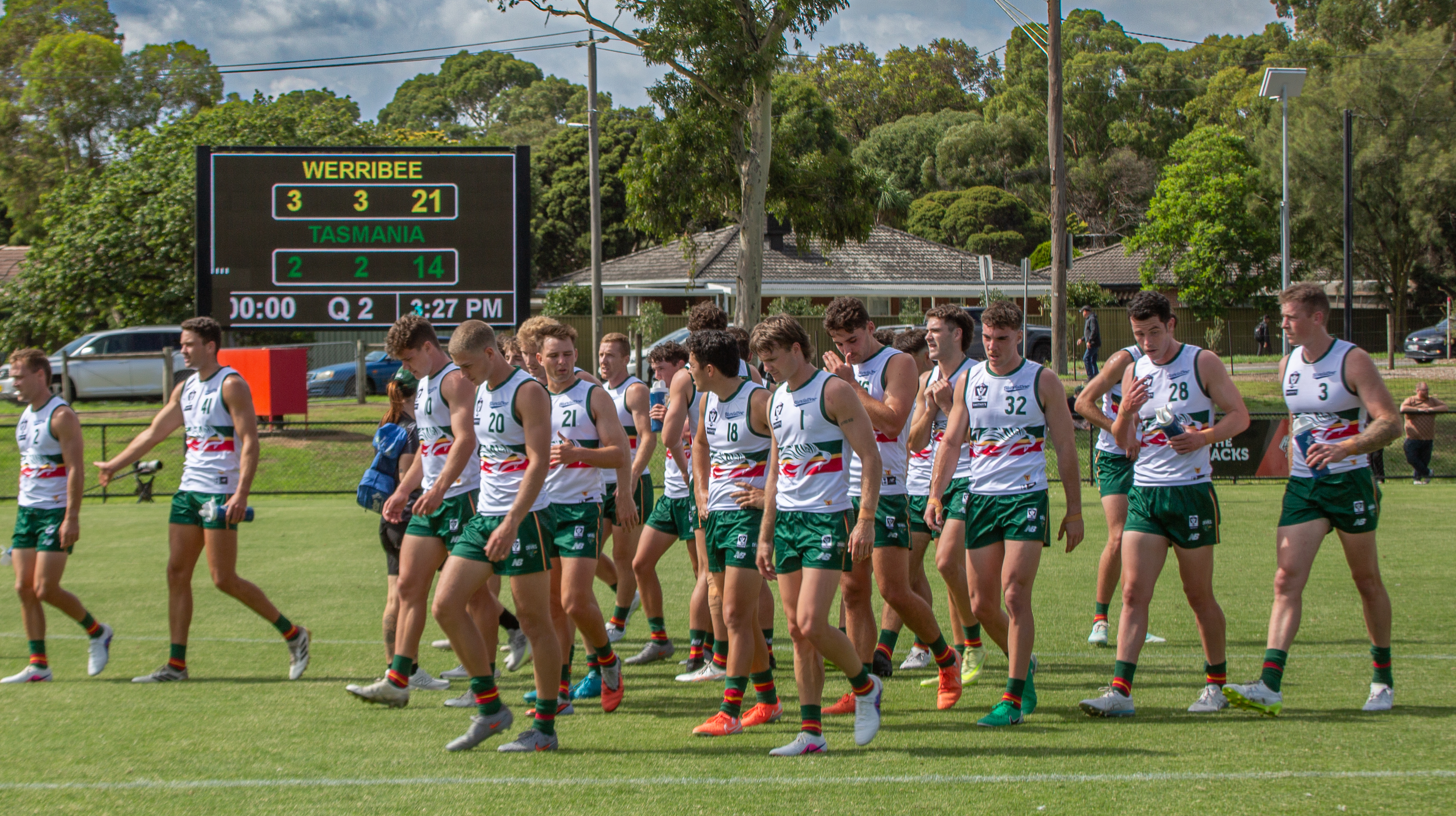
Tasmania during its first VFL practice match against Werribee on 7 March 2026

On 5 September 2025, Tasmania was granted a licence to compete in the Victorian Football League (VFL) and VFL Women's (VFLW), starting in 2026. Home games will be played in Hobart and Launceston, with the possibility of also playing games in Penguin. Jeromey Webberley was appointed as the club's inaugural VFL coach, while former Essendon player Jye Menzie became the club's first player when he was signed on 30 September 2025.

To build its inaugural AFL playing list, the Devils will receive picks 1, 3, 5, 7, 9, 11 and 13, and the first selection of each subsequent round in the 2027 national draft; among those, picks 5, 7, 11 and 13 must be traded with other clubs. In their second and third drafts, the Devils will receive fixed picks 5 (to be traded), 9 and the first selection in each round from the second round onwards, in addition to their natural draft hand. The club will have a $5 million sign-on bonus to sit outside the salary cap for the first two years in the competition and an increased list size of up to 48 players for the first three AFL seasons, gradually reducing to regular list size by the sixth season. Similar concessions were granted to the women's team. The club will have the right to pre-select eligible Tasmanian based players in advance of each of their first four drafts, before transitioning towards matching bids on their Tasmanian Academy players by 2033, under the bidding system that applies to the rest of the competition's academy teams at New South Wales and Queensland clubs. The club was also granted access to players as eligible father-sons if a prospect's father was a Tasmanian-born player who played 100 or more AFL matches, or 200 or more Tasmanian State League matches.

Tasmania made its competitive debut in the VFL on 21 March 2026, in a match against the Coburg Lions. Playing before a capacity crowd of 10,634 spectators at North Hobart Oval, the Devils won 14.12 (96) to 11.13 (79). The women's team made its debut in the VFLW on 16 May 2026, and was defeated by Casey Demons 4.5 (29) to 8.6 (54) at North Hobart Oval. The VFL side was very competitive throughout their inaugural playing season and finished in the top four, though was eliminated by Essendon in the semi-finals.

On 20 July 2026, former Port Adelaide senior coach Ken Hinkley was appointed Tasmania's inaugural AFL coach. Hinkley was signed to a five-year deal commencing in late 2026, enabling him to coach the senior team through to the end of the 2031 season.

== Identity ==
=== Club song ===
The club announced a theme-song for the initial 2026 VFL team sung to the tune of "Along the Road to Gundagai."

=== Nickname and colours ===
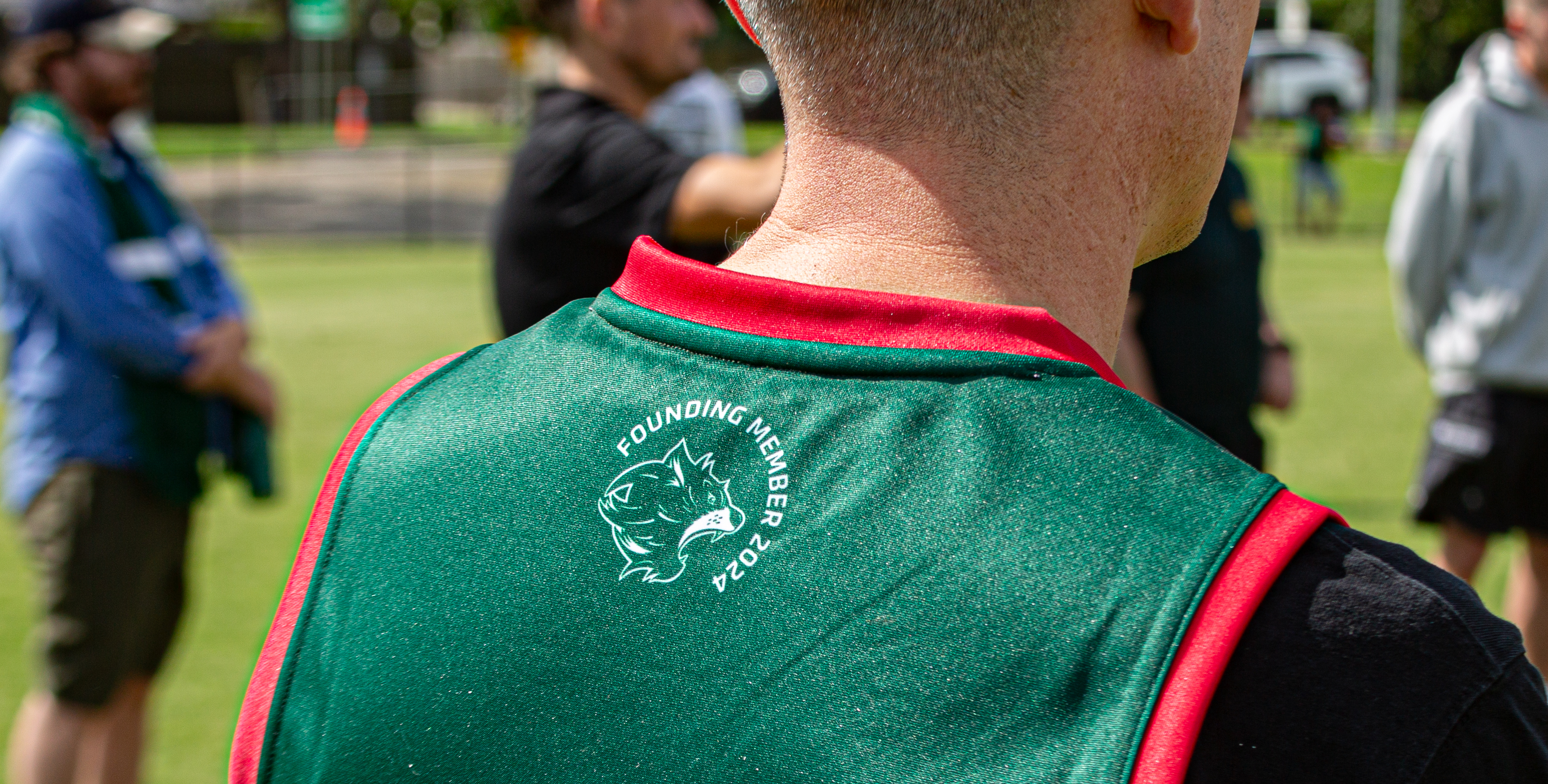
The club's logo on a fan-worn guernsey

On 18 March 2024, the Tasmania Football Club's branding, colours and foundation guernsey were officially launched at several historical football-related sites across the state. The team's name was announced as the Tasmania Devils, with the nickname acknowledging the carnivorous marsupial extinct on the mainland and found only in Tasmania.

The 'devils' nickname has previously been used by the state's Victorian Football League (VFL) and Talent League sides and was confirmed only after negotiations with Warner Bros., whose Tasmanian Devil cartoon character held a trademark on the name. The colours of myrtle green, rose red and primrose yellow were adopted and are based on the colours of the historical Tasmanian interstate representative teams. A foundation guernsey, green with a centrally located red "T" on a yellow map of Tasmania, was unveiled. The guernsey received some criticism for being underwhelming, though Tasmanian broadcaster David Lithgow later confirmed the guernsey was considered a "foundation jumper" by the club to be used sparingly in the AFL.

=== Mascot ===
In March 2025, the club unveiled the team's mascot, Rum'un, a Tasmanian Devil made of materials sourced from recycled school uniforms throughout Tasmania. The name is Tasmanian slang for "an odd or eccentric person; a scallywag, or someone cheeky".

=== Home grounds ===
The club will initially split home games between York Park in Launceston and Bellerive Oval in Hobart, before shifting Hobart-based matches to the proposed Macquarie Point Stadium in 2031.

=== Training base ===
The club will be based at the Kingston Twin Ovals complex, located in the town of Kingston, twelve kilometres south of the Hobart City Centre. The facility has been the long-term home ground of the Kingborough Football Club. $60 million was initially allocated to upgrading the facility for the Devils, however by May 2025 this had blown out to $105 million.

In addition to the two existing football ovals at the site, two more ovals, a gym, aquatic centre, recovery areas, indoor training and administrative facilities will be built, providing a permanent home for the club's teams. The Kingston announcement came after several months of geotechnical investigations at the government's original site, within or adjacent to the Rosny Parklands on Hobart's eastern shore, revealed extensive works would need to be completed to allow the construction of the facility.

== Leadership roles ==
Grant O'Brien, former CEO of Woolworths and chair of Tourism Tasmania, was appointed the new club's first chairman in July 2023 by the Tasmanian AFL Licence Taskforce. In September, a board chaired by O'Brien was announced, including Kath McCann, James Henderson (AFL talent manager), Alastair Lynch, Alicia Leis, Roger Curtis, Laura McBain, Graeme Gardner and Kathy Schaefer. Former Richmond player Jack Riewoldt was appointed club culture manager.

Former Richmond Football Club CEO Brendon Gale was appointed the club's inaugural Chief Executive Officer (CEO) in 2025. In addition, Lauren Jauncey was appointed General Manager of Strategy, People & Culture in February 2025 and James Creak was appointed General Manager Commercial and Partnerships in June 2025.

== Corporate ==
During the 2024 launch, the club commenced selling foundation membership packs for between A$10 and $15 with an initial target of 40,000 by October (one of the original conditions of entry set by the AFL). The club exceeded this target within 2 hours and had sold over 121,000 memberships just two days after launch, giving it the highest on-paper membership of any club in the AFL and taking just 24 hours to break the league's all-time membership record.

In September 2024, the club passed 200,000 members, raising a total of more than $2 million in membership revenue and making it the 5th largest sports club in the world by total membership. The club has over 211,000 members as of 8 August 2025.

=== Sponsorship ===
Tasmania's inaugural sponsorship arrangement, announced in February 2026, was made with Hobart-based footwear brand Blundstone Footwear (stylised as simply "Blundstone"). Their branding was placed on the front chest and bottom of the back of the guernsey, and the sponsorship is in effect until 2032. Confectionery company Cadbury will be the club's back-of-guernsey sponsor for the club’s women’s and men’s VFL and VFLW teams in 2026 and 2027, and the AFL and AFLW teams from 2028 to 2030.

Year	Guernsey manufacturer	Front of guernsey sponsor	Bottom back of guernsey sponsor	Top back of guernsey sponsor	Shorts sponsor
2026–	New Balance	Blundstone	Blundstone (until August); Cadbury (since August)	Blundstone	None

== Club teams ==
=== Football department ===
In May 2025, the club made its first key appointments of its inaugural football department, being Derek Hine as Head of Recruiting and Todd Patterson as Head of List Management and Strategy. Subsequently, the club appointed Scott Clayton as a Future Talent Consultant and the club's first employee, Lizzie Dingeldei, as National Football Recruiting Assistant.

=== VFL team ===
After Jye Menzie became the first player signed to the VFL team in September 2025, the club built up the team-at-large over the next few months. The foundation VFL squad was confirmed on 18 December 2025 with Robbie Fox the inaugural VFL captain.

Tasmania Football Club VFL personnel
Playing list		Coaching staff
Zach Adams; Jaxon Artemis; Harry Bayles; Nelson Beikoff-Smart; Bailey Boag; Jacob Boyd; Jarvis Breen; Harry Brereton; Jack Callinan; Kai Cameron; Brad Cox-Goodyer; Oliver Depaoli-Kubank; Hugh Dixon; Harry Elmer; Robbie Fox (c); Darcy Gardner; Max Geappen; Sam Green; Jed Hagan; Lachy Hay; Maddox Iverach; Theo Ives; Brandon Leary; Max Mapley	Khali Matthews; Tyler McGinness; Rylee McHenry; Charlie Meadows; Jye Menzie (vc); Jack Miller; Caleb Mitchell; Baxter Norton; Yor Nyanjok; Cameron Owen; Oscar Paprotny; Geordie Payne; Max Roney; Sam Siggins; Baker Smith; Will Splann; Michael Stingel; Nathaniel Sulzberger; Archie Wilkinson; Nick Williams; Josh Wolfe; Lucas Wootton; Rory Wright	Head coach: Jeromey Webberley; Assistant coaches: Adrian Smith; Trent Baumeler; Beau Sharman; Legend: (c) Captain(s); (vc) Vice-captain(s); italics - Inactive player list; Long-term injury; Updated: 18 December 2025; Source(s):

=== VFLW team ===
The inaugural VFLW squad was confirmed in February 2026. Former Greater Western Sydney midfielder Meghan Gaffney was named the inaugural captain of the side.

Tasmania Football Club VFLW personnel
Playing list		Coaching staff
Mackenzie Banks; Brieanna Barwick; Candice Belbin; Jemma Blair; Georgia Clark; Angelica Clark; Lucah Conkie; Maisie Edwards; Matilda Elbourne; Gabbi Featherston; Meghan Gaffney (c); Alicia Gordon; Libby Haines; Ellie Hall; Georgia Hill (vc); Kelsie Hill; Courtney Hingston; Perri King; Dearne Krushka	Madi Lamb; Taia Lette; Jacinta Limbrick; Ella Maurer; Ebony McGinniss; Molly Mitchell; Georgia Nicholas; Bellah Parker; Georgia Purton; Meg Radford; Ava Read; Joey Revell; Emilie Saward; Sarah Skinner; Emma Suckling; Brooke Tuszynski; Grace White; Halle Whitehead; Jessie Williams	Head coach: Georgia Walker; Assistant coaches: Richard Robinson; Bobby Beams; Jarrod Read; Legend: (c) Captain(s); (vc) Vice-captain(s); italics - Inactive player list; Long-term injury; Updated: 3 February 2026; Source(s):

== See also ==
- Australian rules football in Tasmania
- History of the Tasmanian AFL bid
- AFL Tasmania
- Tasmanian Devils (2001–2008)
- Tasmania Devils Academy
- Tassie Mariners
- List of sports clubs by membership
- Sport in Tasmania
