= VFL Women's =

Australian rules football league

- Most recent season or competition: 2026 VFL Women's season
- Founded: 21 March 2016; 10 years ago
- First season: 2016
- Administrator: AFL Victoria
- No. of teams: 12
- State: Victoria; Tasmania
- Current premiers (2026): North Melbourne Werribee (3rd premiership)
- Most premierships: North Melbourne Werribee (3 premierships)
- Broadcaster(s): Seven Network (grand final only)
- Streaming partner(s): AFL.com.au
- Sponsor(s): Rebel
- Related competitions: VFL; AFLW; SANFLW; WAFLW
- Official website: vfl.com.au

VFL Women's (VFLW) is the major state-level women's Australian rules football league in Victoria and Tasmania. The league initially comprised the six Premier Division clubs and the top four Division 1 clubs from the now-defunct Victorian Women's Football League (VWFL), and has since evolved into what is also the second primary competition for AFL Women's (AFLW) clubs in Victoria.

Following the 2017 season, the VFL Women's was reconfigured to affiliate teams more closely with AFL clubs. Since 2021, twelve teams have appeared in the competition; nine of the ten Victorian AFL clubs either field their own women's team or have an affiliation of sorts with an existing club in the VFLW, with the other teams being the VFL-affiliated Port Melbourne, Williamstown and independent club Darebin. The reigning premiers are North Melbourne.

The competition was not held in 2020 due to the impact of the COVID-19 pandemic; the grand final was also cancelled in 2021 due to the pandemic, with no premiership being awarded.

== History ==
AFL Victoria launched the VFL Women's competition on 21 March 2016, with its inaugural season featuring twelve doubleheaders with the Victorian Football League (VFL). The league initially comprised the six Premier Division clubs (Darebin, Diamond Creek, Eastern Devils, Melbourne University, St Kilda Sharks and Western Spurs) and 2015's top four Division 1 clubs (Cranbourne, Geelong Magpies, Knox and Seaford) from the Victorian Women's Football League (VWFL). Melbourne University already had an existing partnership with Australian Football League (AFL) club North Melbourne. Following the 2016 season, the Geelong Magpies were replaced with the AFL-aligned Geelong Cats, and Knox's license was purchased by Box Hill (then subsequently re-licensed to Hawthorn in 2018).

Following the inaugural AFL Women's (AFLW) season in 2017, the league made further changes to the competition to affiliate clubs more directly with AFL clubs and the AFL Women's competition. Five other foundation clubs departed, leaving Darebin, Melbourne University and Western Spurs as the only remaining foundation clubs. The departing clubs were replaced by the AFL-aligned Carlton, Collingwood, Essendon, Richmond and Southern Saints, the VFL-aligned Casey and Williamstown, and the North East Australian Football League (NEAFL)-aligned Northern Territory; Northern Territory aligned with Adelaide's AFLW team, giving Crows players an opportunity to play in the Victorian competition. The Western Bulldogs joined in 2018 under a shared license with the Western Spurs, with the senior Spurs team competing as the Western Bulldogs and wearing red, white and blue. The Western Spurs' license was handed over entirely to the Bulldogs ahead of the 2019 season, with the Spurs fielding teams solely in the Northern Football Netball League.

In 2019, Greater Western Sydney's AFLW team played five invitational matches in Victoria against teams having a bye. Following the 2019 season, AFL Northern Territory ended Northern Territory's involvement in the NEAFL and VFLW competitions, and Williamstown aligned with Adelaide in Northern Territory's place. Melbourne University's license was also taken over by North Melbourne, ending the clubs' ten-year partnership and allowing North Melbourne to field its own standalone team. In 2020, amidst the COVID-19 pandemic, AFL Victoria decided to cancel the 2020 VFL Women's season and instead hold a four-team Super Series in September to give 120 footballers the chance to push their case to be selected in the 2020 AFL Women's draft; this was later cancelled as well due to the increase of restrictions around COVID-19 in Victoria.

The Coburg Football Club, already competing in the VFL, formed a women's team in 2020 with a plan to join the VFLW in 2021. However, the plan did not eventuate.

In 2021, Port Melbourne joined the league, replacing Richmond, which initially left the competition due to financial issues before entering into a formal alignment with the VFL club. The competition also shifted to a February commencement, running concurrently with the AFLW season and mirroring other second-tier leagues like the SANFL Women's and WAFL Women's. In 2023, the competition commenced in March, and Hawthorn transferred its license back to Box Hill.

In 2024, the home-and-away season included matches against New South Wales AFL Women's teams Greater Western Sydney and Sydney; the New South Wales teams were not premiership eligible, but there were premiership points available for the Victorian clubs in the matches. This arrangement did not continue in 2025. Ahead of the 2025 season, Port Melbourne became a stand-alone side as Richmond ended their second-tier alignment with the club and ceased any involvement in second-tier women's state football. Meanwhile reigning premiers North Melbourne entered into an affiliation with VFL club Werribee, becoming known as the North Melbourne Werribee Kangaroos and playing up to four games a season at Chirnside Park. The league announced that the Tasmania Football Club would enter the competition in 2026, as part of the club's eventual elevation to the AFL Women's at a later date.

== Clubs ==
=== Current clubs ===
Club	Colours	Moniker	Home Ground	Former League	Est.	Years in VFLW	Premierships	
Club	Colours	Moniker	Home Ground	Former League	Est.	Years in VFLW	Total	Most recent
Box Hill		Hawks	Box Hill City Oval	–	1936	2017–	0	—
Carlton		Blues	Ikon Park	–	1864	2018–	0	—
Casey		Demons	Casey Fields	–	1902	2018–	0	—
Collingwood		Magpies	Victoria Park	–	1892	2018–	1	2019
Darebin		Falcons	Genis Steel Oval	VWFL	1990	2016–	2	2017
Essendon		Bombers	NEC Hangar	–	1871	2018–	1	2022
Geelong		Cats	Deakin University Elite Sports Precinct	–	1859	2017–	0	—
North Melbourne Werribee		Kangaroos	Arden Street Oval; Chirnside Park	–	1869	2021–	3	2026
Port Melbourne		Borough	ETU Stadium	–	1874	2021–	1	2023
Sandringham		Zebras	Trevor Barker Beach Oval	–	1929	2025–	0	—
Tasmania		Devils	Ninja Stadium; North Hobart Oval; UTAS Stadium; Dial Regional Sports Complex	–	2023	2026–	0	—
Western Bulldogs		Bulldogs	Mision Whitten Oval	–	1877	2018–	0	—
Williamstown		Seagulls	DSV Stadium	–	1864	2018–	0	—

=== Former clubs ===
Club	Colours	Moniker	Home Ground	Former League	Est.	Years in VFLW	Premierships		Current league
Club	Colours	Moniker	Home Ground	Former League	Est.	Years in VFLW	Total	Most recent	Current league
Cranbourne		Eagles	Frenken Homes Oval	VWFL	1889	2016–2017	0	—	SFNL
Diamond Creek		Demons, Creekers	C.T. Barling Reserve	VWFL	2002	2016–2017	0	—	NFNL
Eastern Devils		Devils	Mulgrave Reserve	VWFL	1999	2016–2017	0	—	EFNL
Geelong Magpies		Magpies	Osborne Park	VWFL	1876	2016	0	—	GDFNL
Hawthorn		Hawks	Box Hill City Oval	–	1902	2018–2022	1	2018	AFLW
Knox		Falcons	Knox Gardens Reserve	VWFL	1980	2016	0	—	EFNL
Melbourne University		Mugars	University Oval	VWFL	1996	2016–2019	0	—	VAFA
Northern Territory		Thunder	Marrara Oval	–	2008	2018–2019	0	—	Folded; 2019
Richmond		Tigers	Punt Road Oval	–	1885	2018–2019	0	—	AFLW
Seaford		Tigerettes	RF Miles Recreation Reserve	VWFL	1921	2016–2017	0	—	MPFNL
Southern Saints		Saints	Trevor Barker Beach Oval	–	2017	2018–2024	0	—	Merged; 2024 with Sandringham
St Kilda Sharks		Sharks	Peanut Farm Reserve	VWFL	1992	2016–2017	0	—	In recess
Western Spurs		Spurs	Henry Turner Memorial Reserve	VWFL	1993	2016–2017	0	—	WFNL

== Honours ==
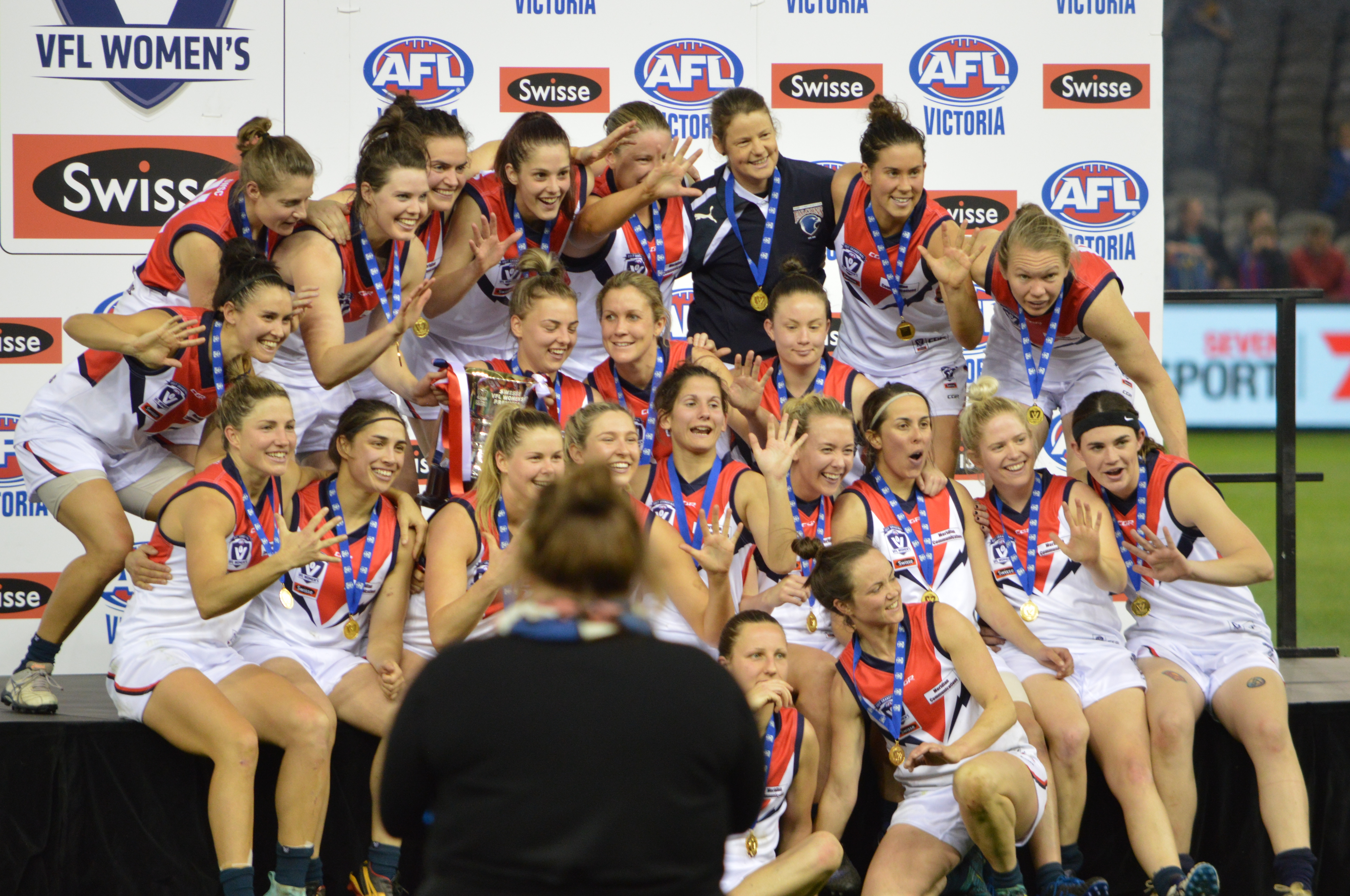
Darebin's 2017 premiership team

=== Premiers ===
- 2016: Darebin
- 2017: Darebin
- 2018: Hawthorn
- 2019: Collingwood
- 2022: Essendon
- 2023: Port Melbourne
- 2024: North Melbourne
- 2025: North Melbourne Werribee
- 2026: North Melbourne Werribee

=== Lambert–Pearce Medal ===
- 2016: Daisy Pearce (Darebin)
- 2017: Katie Brennan (Darebin)
- 2018: Jess Duffin (Williamstown)
- 2019: Lauren Pearce (Darebin)
- 2021: Georgia Nanscawen (Essendon)
- 2022: Georgia Nanscawen (Essendon)
- 2023: Jordan Mifsud (Box Hill), Akayla Peterson (Box Hill), Charlotte Simpson (Geelong Cats) (tied)
- 2024: Dominique Carbone (Western Bulldogs)
- 2025: Angelica Gogos (Darebin)
- 2026: Emily Eaves (Williamstown)

=== Rohenna Young Medal ===
The Rohenna Young Medal is awarded to the leading goalkicker in the VFLW home-and-away season.

- 2016: Moana Hope (St Kilda Sharks – 104 goals)
- 2017: Katie Brennan (Darebin), Chloe Molloy (Diamond Creek – 32 goals each)
- 2018: Darcy Vescio (Carlton – 26 goals)
- 2019: Jaimee Lambert (Collingwood – 21 goals)
- 2021: Imogen Barnett (Collingwood – 20 goals)
- 2022: Federica Frew (Essendon – 29 goals)
- 2023: Sarah Cameron (Williamstown – 18 goals)
- 2024: Monique DeMatteo (Darebin – 24 goals)
- 2025: Nyakoat Dojiok (North Melbourne Werribee – 37 goals)
- 2026: Mia Zielinski (Williamstown – 32 goals)

== See also ==
- AFL Women's
- Victorian Football League
- Victorian Women's Football League
