= 2025 Essendon Football Club season =

151st season of the Essendon Football Club

2025 AFL season
- President: Dave Barham
- Coach: Brad Scott (3rd season)
- Captains: Zach Merrett (4th season)
- Home ground: MCG; Marvel Stadium

The 2025 Essendon Football Club season is the 127th season of the Essendon Football Club playing in the Australian Football League (AFL) and the club's 151st season overall. The club is also fielding reserves teams in the Victorian Football League (VFL) and VFL Women's (VFLW), and is fielding a team in the AFL Women's (AFLW).

== AFL ==
=== Season summary ===
The 2025 season saw the Essendon Football Club finish 15th on the AFL ladder, recording 6 wins and 17 losses. Under senior coach Brad Scott in his third season, the Bombers failed to qualify for the finals series. Despite a promising start, a string of defeats in the middle and latter parts of the season ultimately curtailed their campaign. Captain Zach Merrett continued to lead from the front, but the team struggled with consistency across all lines.

Essendon finished the 2025 AFL season in 15th place with a 6–17 record, missing the finals for the fourth consecutive year.

=== Arrivals ===
Player	Previous Club	League	via
Ben McKay	North Melbourne	AFL	Free Agency
Todd Goldstein	North Melbourne	AFL	Free Agency
Jade Gresham	St Kilda	AFL	Free Agency
Xavier Duursma	Port Adelaide	AFL	Trade
Nate Caddy	Northern Knights	Coates Talent League	AFL Draft, Pick 10
Luamon Lual	Greater Western Victoria Rebels	Coates Talent League	AFL Draft, Pick 39
Archie Roberts	Sandringham Dragons	Coates Talent League	AFL Draft, Pick 54
Vigo Visentini	Sandringham Dragons	Coates Talent League	Rookie Draft, Pick 8

=== Departures ===
Player	New Club	League	via
Brandon Zerk-Thatcher	Port Adelaide	AFL	Trade
Massimo D'Ambrosio	Hawthorn	AFL	Trade
Anthony McDonald-Tipungwuti	—	—	Retired
Andrew Phillips	—	—	Retired
Will Snelling	—	—	Delisted
Patrick Voss	Fremantle	AFL	Delisted
Cian McBride	—	—	Delisted
Alastair Lord	—	—	Delisted
Rhett Montgomerie	—	—	Delisted
Anthony Munkara	—	—	Delisted

Essendon 2025 AFL Playing list and statistics
Player	No.	2025 AFL Statistics								
Player	No.	Games	Goals	Behinds	Kicks	Handballs	Disposals	Marks	Tackles	Hitouts
Nic Martin	37	16	11	6	224	165	389	111	42	0
Zach Merrett	7	22	9	11	335	276	611	82	96	0
Andrew McGrath	1	23	1	3	225	298	523	81	56	0
Jye Caldwell	6	11	5	3	137	148	285	44	74	0
Sam Durham	22	20	8	7	201	236	437	59	82	0
Mason Redman	27	19	4	6	324	111	435	100	35	0
Jayden Laverde	15	14	0	0	139	77	216	97	25	0
Jade Gresham	11	19	10	7	122	127	249	48	55	0
Ben McKay	32	10	0	0	51	37	88	44	14	0
Darcy Parish	3	3	0	1	31	57	88	7	7	0
Jake Stringer	25	0	0	0	0	0	0	0	0	0
Kyle Langford	4	9	8	1	60	40	100	28	18	0
Xavier Duursma	28	22	10	6	219	209	428	114	67	0
Archie Perkins	16	21	17	6	154	141	295	59	48	0
Nik Cox	13	0	0	0	0	0	0	0	0	0
Harry Jones	23	7	2	2	45	26	71	26	19	5
Jordan Ridley	14	10	0	2	121	49	170	55	6	0
Dylan Shiel	9	14	2	2	141	155	296	53	40	0
Sam Draper	2	5	7	2	36	31	67	18	14	103
Nick Hind	19	0	0	0	0	0	0	0	0	0
Peter Wright	20	19	28	20	142	83	225	88	45	198
Matt Guelfi	35	12	9	6	55	55	110	21	35	0
Ben Hobbs	8	18	5	8	129	139	268	38	68	0
Todd Goldstein	17	16	1	0	60	132	192	42	19	427
Jye Menzie	47	10	9	7	48	27	75	32	15	0
Nate Caddy	30	17	20	20	130	56	186	67	17	2
Will Setterfield	12	13	1	3	148	134	282	54	96	0
Archie Roberts	38	23	2	3	304	259	563	122	52	0
Elijah Tsatas	5	5	1	1	40	44	84	5	6	0
Nick Bryan	24	4	0	1	30	9	39	7	7	76
Alwyn Davey	33	0	0	0	0	0	0	0	0	0
Sam Weideman	10	0	0	0	0	0	0	0	0	0
Zach Reid	31	10	0	0	110	44	154	77	25	2
Isaac Kako	10	23	15	9	127	130	257	45	58	0
Jaxon Prior	25	23	0	1	254	108	362	113	35	0
Kayle Gerreyn	19	0	0	0	0	0	0	0	0	0
Luamon Lual	39	12	4	0	50	53	103	35	26	0
Vigo Visentini	18	2	0	0	8	17	25	4	3	25

=== Practice matches ===
Date and local time	Opponent	**Scores** (Essendon's scores indicated in **bold**)			Venue	Attendance	Ref.
Date and local time	Opponent	Home	Away	Result	Venue	Attendance	Ref.
Saturday, 15 February (2:00pm)	Western Bulldogs	8.10 (58)	**11.11 (77)**	Won by 19 points	Mission Whitten Oval	—	
Tuesday, 24 February (7.10pm)	Geelong	12.11 (83)	**17.2 (104)**	Won by 21 points	GMHBA Stadium	11,626	

=== Home-and-away season ===
Rd	Date and local time	Opponent	**Scores** (Essendon's scores indicated in **bold**)			Venue	Attendance	Position	Ref.
Rd	Date and local time	Opponent	Home	Away	Result	Venue	Attendance	Position	Ref.
OR	Wednesday, 27 August (7:20pm)	Gold Coast	23.15 (153)	**8.10 (58)**	Lost by 95 points	People First Stadium	16,768	15th	
1	Friday, 14 March (7:40pm)	Hawthorn	17.9 (111)	**12.13 (85)**	Lost by 26 points	Melbourne Cricket Ground	80,735	14th ▼	—
2	Friday, 14 March (7:40pm)	Adelaide	**15.10 (100)**	25.11 (161)	Lost by 61 points	Melbourne Cricket Ground	46,688	16th ▼	—
3	Thursday, 27 March (7:30pm)	Port Adelaide	**9.18 (72)**	8.12 (60)	Won by 12 points	Marvel Stadium	25,114	14th ▲	—
4	Bye							14th	—
5	Saturday, 12 April (7:05pm)	Melbourne	8.9 (57)	**15.6 (96)**	Won by 39 points	Adelaide Oval	45,039	13th ▲	—
6	Friday, 18 April (4:10pm)	West Coast	11.9 (75)	**11.11 (77)**	Won by 2 points	Optus Stadium	46,080	11th ▲	—
7	Friday, 25 April (3:20pm)	Collingwood	16.11 (107)	**10.6 (66)**	Lost by 41 points	Melbourne Cricket Ground	92,044	12th ▼	—
8	Thursday, 1 May (7:30pm)	North Melbourne	**9.11 (65)**	9.8 (62)	Won by 3 points	Marvel Stadium	35,439	11th ▲	
9	Saturday, 10 May (4:15pm)	Sydney	**11.5 (71)**	8.15 (63)	Won by 8 points	Marvel Stadium	43,799	9th ▲	—
10	Saturday, 17 May (7:35pm)	Western Bulldogs	18.19 (127)	**5.6 (36)**	Lost by 91 points	Marvel Stadium	47,266	10th ▼	—
11	Friday, 23 May (7:40pm)	Richmond	**11.15 (81)**	8.10 (58)	Won by 23 points	Melbourne Cricket Ground	76,051	10th	—
12	Thursday, 29 May (7:30pm)	Brisbane	13.12 (90)	**11.6 (72)**	Lost by 18 points	The Gabba	26,441	10th	—
13	Sunday, 8 June (7:20pm)	Carlton	11.12 (78)	**11.4 (70)**	Lost by 8 points	Melbourne Cricket Ground	74,280	12th ▼	—
14	Saturday, 14 June (4:15pm)	Geelong	**8.8 (56)**	23.13 (151)	Lost by 95 points	Melbourne Cricket Ground	61,643	12th	—
15	Thursday, 19 June (6:10pm)	Fremantle	16.8 (104)	**9.9 (63)**	Lost by 41 points	Optus Stadium	37,570	13th ▼	—
16	Bye							13th	
17	Saturday, 5 July (12:35pm)	Gold Coast	**11.8 (74)**	18.7 (115)	Lost by 41 points	Marvel Stadium	29,672	13th	—
18	Saturday, 12 July (7:45pm)	Richmond	6.10 (46)	**4.13 (37)**	Lost by 9 points	Melbourne Cricket Ground	52,125	14th ▼	—
19	Thursday, 17 July (7:30pm)	Greater Western Sydney	**7.14 (56)**	16.8 (104)	Lost by 48 points	Marvel Stadium	20,347	14th	—
20	Friday, 25 July (7:20pm)	Western Bulldogs	**7.8 (50)**	22.11 (143)	Lost by 93 points	Marvel Stadium	29,367	15th ▼	—
21	Saturday, 2 August (4:15pm)	Sydney	9.14 (68)	**7.12 (54)**	Lost by 14 points	Sydney Cricket Ground	20,805	15th	—
22	Friday, 8 August (7:40pm)	Geelong	15.19 (109)	**10.5 (65)**	Lost by 44 points	Kardinia Park	30,289	15th	—
23	Friday, 15 August (7:20pm)	St Kilda	**11.9 (75)**	11.11 (77)	Lost by 2 points	Marvel Stadium	31,107	15th	—
24	Thursday, 21 August (7:30pm)	Carlton	**8.8 (56)**	13.12 (90)	Lost by 34 points	Melbourne Cricket Ground	41,150	15th	

=== Ladder ===
Pos	Team	Pld	W	L	D	PF	PA	PP	Pts	Qualification
1	Adelaide	23	18	5	0	2278	1635	139.3	72	Finals series
2	Geelong	23	17	6	0	2425	1714	141.5	68	Finals series
3	Brisbane Lions (P)	23	16	6	1	2061	1804	114.2	66	Finals series
4	Collingwood	23	16	7	0	1991	1627	122.4	64	Finals series
5	Greater Western Sydney	23	16	7	0	2114	1834	115.3	64	Finals series
6	Fremantle	23	16	7	0	1978	1815	109.0	64	Finals series
7	Gold Coast	23	15	8	0	2173	1740	124.9	60	Finals series
8	Hawthorn	23	15	8	0	2045	1691	120.9	60	Finals series
9	Western Bulldogs	23	14	9	0	2493	1820	137.0	56	
10	Sydney	23	12	11	0	1845	1902	97.0	48	
11	Carlton	23	9	14	0	1799	1861	96.7	36	
12	St Kilda	23	9	14	0	1839	2077	88.5	36	
13	Port Adelaide	23	9	14	0	1705	2136	79.8	36	
14	Melbourne	23	7	16	0	1902	2038	93.3	28	
**15**	Essendon	**23**	**6**	**17**	**0**	**1535**	**2209**	**69.5**	24	
16	North Melbourne	23	5	17	1	1805	2365	76.3	22	
17	Richmond	23	5	18	0	1449	2197	66.0	20	
18	West Coast	23	1	22	0	1466	2438	60.1	4	

Source: afl.com.au
Rules for classification: 1) points; 2) percentage; 3) number of points for
(P) Premiers

== VFL ==
2025 VFL season
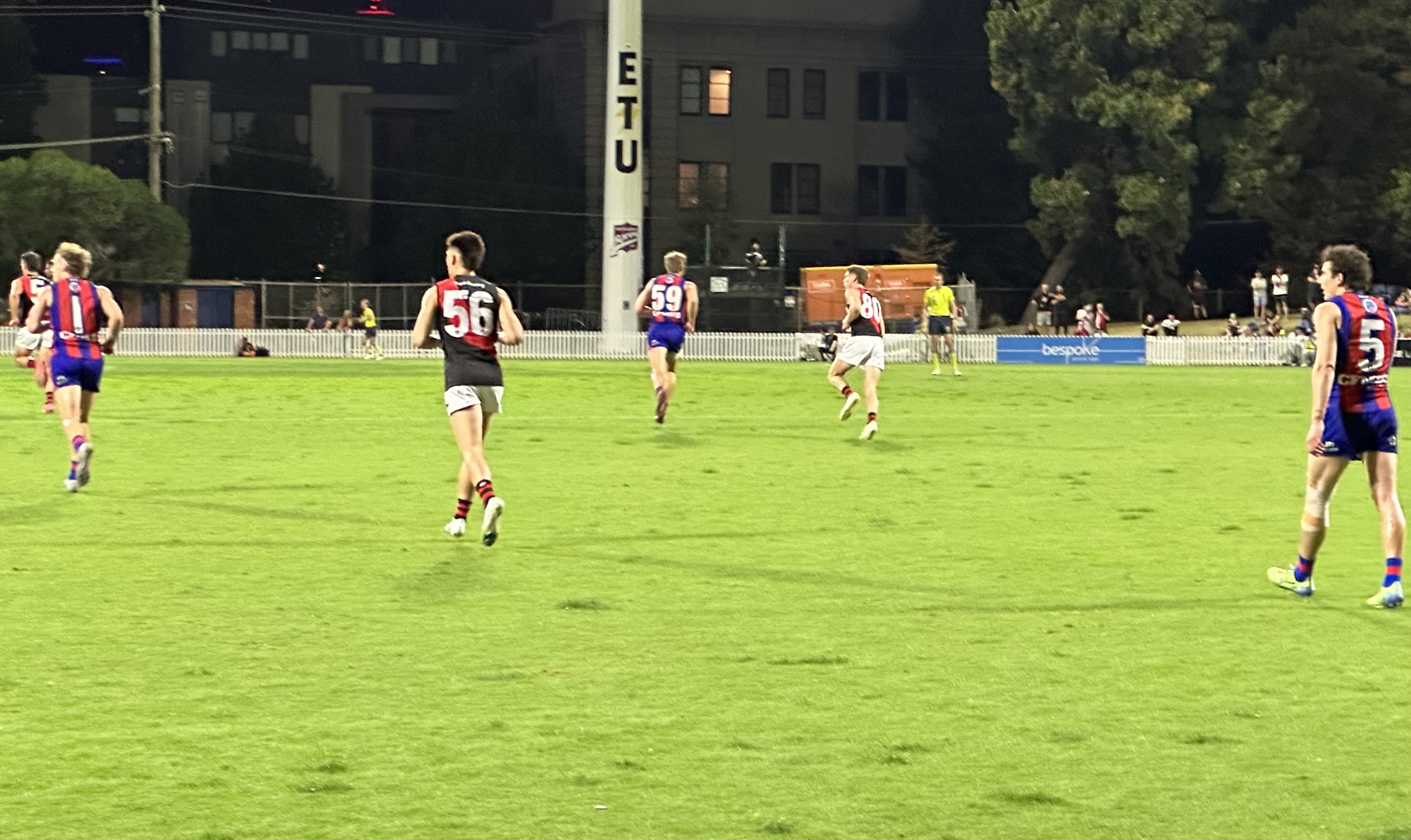
- Essendon playing Port Melbourne in round 4
- Coach: Cameron Joyce
- Captain: Xavier O'Neill
- Home ground: NEC Hangar; Windy Hill

On 4 February 2025, Essendon VFL coach Dale Tapping died, two years after he was diagnosed with myeloma, an aggressive form of blood cancer. Essendon had appointed Tapping as its VFL coach for the 2025 season only several months prior on 11 October 2024. He had previously served as Collingwood's VFL coach from 2013 until the end of the 2016 season, and was named VFL Coach of the Year in 2016.

Cameron Joyce, who coached Gold Coast in the AFL Women's (AFLW) from 2022 season 6 until he was dismissed at the end of the 2024 season, was announced as Essendon's new VFL coach on 24 February 2025.

Essendon's round 5 match against Collingwood was rescheduled from a 2:05pm start at Windy Hill to 7:10pm at ETU Stadium in order for it to be shown live on 7mate as part of a new broadcast rights deal with the Seven Network.

=== Playing squad ===
No.	Player	VFL debut	Community club	Ref
50	Jackson Hately	2024	St Bernard's (VAFA)	
51	Will Hoare	2022	Pascoe Vale (EDFL)	
52	Ricky Monti (D)	2022	Golden Square (BFNL)	
53	Jack Peris	2022	Seymour (GVFNL)	
54	Hamish Sinnott (D)	2022	Camperdown (HFNL)	
55	Xavier O'Neill	2024	Blackburn (EFNL)	
56	Shane Clough (D)	2025	Gisborne (BFNL)	
57	Noah Scott (D)	—	Pascoe Vale (EDFL)	
58	Jared Eckersley (D)	2022	Pascoe Vale (EDFL)	
59	Dayten Uerata (D)	—	Sandhurst (BFNL)	
60	Ryan Brodie (D)	2024	Strathmore (EDFL)	
61	Riley Leedham (D)	—	Greenvale (EDFL)	
62	Mahmoud Taha (D)	2023	Pascoe Vale (EDFL)	
63	Oskar Smartt (D)	2024	Colac (GFNL)	
64	Domanic Akuei	2022	St Mary's (NFNL)	
65	Cam Nyko (D)	2024	Montmorency (NFNL)	

(D) Development list

=== Playing squad changes ===
==== Departures ====
Player	Date	Reason	New club	Ref
Amin Naim	18 October 2024	Club change	Northern Bullants	
Charlie Bolmat	21 October 2024	Club change	Northern Bullants	
James Barrat	21 November 2024	AFL drafted	St Kilda (AFL)	
Ryan Eyre	2 December 2024	Club change	Collingwood	
Kane Loftus	6 February 2025	VFL departure	University Blacks (VAFA)	
Noah Caracella	3 March 2025	VFL departure	Newtown & Chilwell (GFNL)	
Luca Alessio	11 March 2025	VFL departure	St Bernard's (VAFA)	
Oscar Duncan	11 March 2025	VFL departure	—	
Malik Gordon	11 March 2025	VFL departure	Strathfieldsaye (BFNL)	
Macca Hallows	11 March 2025	VFL departure	Pascoe Vale (EDFL)	
Jack Jedwab	11 March 2025	VFL departure	Romsey (RDFNL)	
Michael Kiraly	11 March 2025	Club change	Collingwood	

=== Practice matches ===
Date and local time	Opponent	**Scores** (Essendon's scores indicated in **bold**)			Venue	Attendance	Ref
Date and local time	Opponent	Home	Away	Result	Venue	Attendance	Ref
Saturday, 15 February (5:00pm)	Footscray	13.12 (90)	**11.4 (70)**	Lost by 20 points	Mission Whitten Oval	—	
Tuesday, 24 February	Geelong	9.13 (67)	**12.12 (84)**	Won by 17 points	GMHBA Stadium	—	
Saturday, 8 March	Collingwood	**14.12 (96)**	8.13 (61)	Won by 35 points	NEC Hangar	—	
Friday, 14 March	Box Hill	**11.8 (74)**	18.7 (115)	Lost by 41 points	NEC Hangar	—	
Saturday, 12 April	Box Hill	**8.6 (54)**	8.7 (55)	Lost by 1 point	NEC Hangar	—	

=== Home-and-away season ===
Rd	Date and local time	Opponent	**Scores** (Essendon's scores indicated in **bold**)			Venue	Attendance	Position	Ref
Rd	Date and local time	Opponent	Home	Away	Result	Venue	Attendance	Position	Ref
1	Saturday, 22 March (3:05pm)	Williamstown	**14.10 (94)**	12.11 (83)	Won by 11 points	NEC Hangar	—	7th	
2	Saturday, 29 March (11:05am)	Werribee	**11.12 (78)**	7.13 (55)	Lost by 23 points	NEC Hangar	—	12th ▼	
3	Bye							14th ▼	
4	Saturday, 19 April (7:10pm)	Port Melbourne	7.13 (55)	**9.17 (71)**	Won by 16 points	ETU Stadium	2,000	10th ▲	
5	Saturday, 26 April (7:10pm)	Collingwood	**12.16 (88)**	18.11 (119)	Lost by 31 points	ETU Stadium	—	14th ▼	
6	Friday, 2 May (2:05pm)	North Melbourne	**10.13 (73)**	12.11 (83)	Lost by 10 points	Windy Hill	—	15th ▼	
7	Saturday, 10 May (11:05am)	Sydney	**16.11 (107)**	5.12 (42)	Won by 65 points	Windy Hill	—	11th ▲	
8	Bye							12th ▼	—
9	Saturday, 24 May (7:10pm)	Richmond	10.14 (74)	**7.10 (52)**	Lost by 22 points	Kinetic Stadium	—	15th ▼	—
10	Friday, 30 May (12:05pm)	Brisbane	18.11 (119)	**15.9 (99)**	Lost by 20 points	Brighton Homes Arena	—	15th	—
11	Sunday, 8 June (2:05pm)	Carlton	**8.6 (54)**	10.12 (72)	Lost by 18 points	Windy Hill	—	17th ▼	—
12	Saturday, 14 June (7:10pm)	Casey	17.10 (110)	**12.11 (83)**	Lost by 29 points	ETU Stadium	—	17th	—
13	Saturday, 21 June (7:10pm)	Frankston	9.12 (66)	**9.6 (60)**	Lost by 6 points	Kinetic Stadium	1,442	17th	—
14	Bye							18th ▼	—
15	Saturday, 5 July (1:05pm)	Gold Coast	**13.8 (86)**	14.16 (100)	Lost by 14 points	NEC Hangar	—	18th	—
16	Saturday, 12 July (2:05pm)	Box Hill	20.14 (134)	**9.11 (65)**	Lost by 69 points	Box Hill City Oval	1,820	18th	—
17	Friday, 18 July (2:05pm)	Greater Western Sydney	**12.8 (80)**	15.11 (101)	Lost by 21 points	Windy Hill	—	18th	—
18	Saturday, 26 July (1:05pm)	Footscray	**5.2 (32)**	13.17 (95)	Lost by 63 points	NEC Hangar	—	19th ▼	—
19	Saturday, 2 August (2:05pm)	Sydney	15.10 (105)	**9.11 (65)**	Lost by 40 points	Tramway Oval	—	20th ▼	—
20	Saturday, 9 August (12:05pm)	Geelong	10.13 (73)	**9.5 (59)**	Lost by 14 points	GMHBA Stadium	—	20th	—
21	Saturday, 16 August (2:15pm)	Sandringham	7.12 (54)	**17.13 (115)**	Won by 61 points	Trevor Barker Oval	—	19th ▲	—

=== Ladder ===
Pos	Team	Pld	W	L	D	PF	PA	PP	Pts	Qualification
1	Footscray (R) (P)	18	15	3	0	1670	1146	145.7	60	Qualifying and elimination finals
2	Box Hill	18	14	4	0	1726	1266	136.3	56	Qualifying and elimination finals
3	Southport	18	13	4	1	1808	1368	132.2	54	Qualifying and elimination finals
4	Frankston	18	12	5	1	1630	1466	111.2	50	Qualifying and elimination finals
5	Casey	18	11	6	1	1743	1286	135.5	46	Qualifying and elimination finals
6	Brisbane (R)	18	11	6	1	1748	1605	108.9	46	Qualifying and elimination finals
7	Collingwood (R)	18	11	7	0	1532	1511	101.4	44	Wilcard finals
8	Richmond (R)	18	11	7	0	1365	1366	99.9	44	Wilcard finals
9	Greater Western Sydney (R)	18	10	8	0	1637	1443	113.4	40	Wilcard finals
10	Williamstown	18	10	8	0	1574	1504	104.7	40	Wilcard finals
11	Coburg	18	9	9	0	1525	1452	105.0	36	
12	Geelong (R)	18	9	9	0	1472	1466	100.4	36	
13	Carlton (R)	18	8	10	0	1387	1586	87.5	32	
14	Gold Coast (R)	18	7	10	1	1466	1493	98.2	30	
15	North Melbourne (R)	18	7	10	1	1500	1528	98.2	30	
16	Werribee	18	7	11	0	1325	1378	96.2	28	
17	Port Melbourne	18	6	11	1	1396	1399	99.8	26	
18	Sydney (R)	18	5	13	0	1240	1657	74.8	20	
19	Essendon (R)	18	4	14	0	1338	1560	85.8	16	
20	Sandringham	18	3	14	1	1286	1772	72.6	14	
21	Northern Bullants	18	2	16	0	1024	2140	47.9	8	

Source: AFL.com.au
Rules for classification: 1) points; 2) percentage; 3) number of points for
(R) Club is the reserves team of a senior club of the Australian Football League
(P) Premiers

== AFLW ==
=== Arrivals ===
Player	Previous Club	League	via
Courtney Murphy	Greater Western Sydney	AFLW	Trade
Grace Belloni	Eastern Ranges	Coates Talent League	AFLW Draft, Pick 8
Holly Ridewood	Northern Knights	Coates Talent League	AFLW Draft, Pick 12
Taya Chambers	East Fremantle	WAFLW	AFLW Draft, Pick 30
Sophie Strong	—	—	AFLW Draft

=== Departures ===
Player	New Club	League	via
Amber Clarke	St Kilda	AFLW	Trade
Ash Van Loon	Sydney	AFLW	Trade
Catherine Phillips	—	—	Retired
Lily-Rose Williamson	—	—	Delisted
Kodi Jacques	—	—	Delisted
Jacqui Vogt	—	—	Delisted

=== Playing List ===
Essendon 2025 AFLW Playing List
Player	No.
Emily Gough	1
Georgia Gee	2
Daria Bannister	3
Madison Prespakis	4
Georgia Nanscawen	5
Maddison Gay	6
Grace Belloni	7
Bonnie Toogood	8
Brooke Walker	9
Holly Ridewood	10
Brooke Sheridan	11
Elizabeth Keaney	12
Taya Chambers	13
Ellyse Gamble	14
Chloe Adams	15
Matilda Dyke	16
Georgia Clarke	17
Sophie Strong	18
Mia Van Dyke	19
Stephanie Cain	20
Maggie MacLachlan	21
Amelia Radford	22
Amy Gaylor	23
Sophie Alexander	24
Alexandra Morcom	25
Amelie Gladman	26
Sophie Van de Heuvel	27
Mia Busch	28
Jess Verbrugge	29
Stephanie Wales	30
Grace Brooker	32
Courtney Murphy	33
Brooke Brown	36

=== Home & Away ===
Rd	Date and local time	Opponent	**Scores** (Essendon's scores indicated in **bold**)			Venue	Attendance	Ladder	Ref.
Rd	Date and local time	Opponent	Home	Away	Result	Venue	Attendance	Ladder	Ref.
1	Saturday, 16 August (5:35pm)	Greater Western Sydney	3.11 (29)	**13.7 (85)**	Won by 56 points	Manuka Oval	2,258	1st	
2	Sunday, 24 August (2:35pm)	West Coast	**4.7 (31)**	4.2 (26)	Won by 5 points	Windy Hill	2,635	1st	
3	Friday, 29 August (6:45pm)	Richmond	3.10 (28)	**6.7 (43)**	Won by 15 points	TIO Stadium	5,892	1st	
4	Sunday, 7 September (3:05pm)	Geelong	**4.3 (27)**	8.10 (58)	Lost by 31 points	Windy Hill	2,359	4th	
5	Sunday, 14 September (1:05pm)	St Kilda	**1.2 (8)**	9.6 (60)	Lost by 52 points	Windy Hill	2,640	7th	
6	Friday, 26 September (3:05pm)	North Melbourne	**6.5 (41)**	10.11 (71)	Lost by 30 points	Windy Hill	3,184	8th	
7	Friday, 3 October (7:15pm)	Melbourne	5.6 (36)	**3.4 (22)**	Lost by 14 points	Ikon Park	2,681	9th	
8	Friday, 10 October (7:15pm)	Western Bulldogs	10.7 (67)	**1.4 (10)**	Lost by 57 points	Mission Whitten Oval	4,234	12th	
9	Sunday, 19 October (1:05pm)	Brisbane	**2.4 (16)**	7.12 (54)	Lost by 38 points	Windy Hill	1,801	14th	
10	Saturday, 25 October (3:05pm)	Hawthorn	**3.8 (26)**	7.14 (56)	Lost by 30 points	Windy Hill	2,652	15th	
11	Saturday, 1 November (5:40pm)	Sydney	1.5 (11)	**2.2 (14)**	Won by 3 points	C.ex Coffs International Stadium	1,563	14th	

=== Ladder ===
Pos	Team	Pld	W	L	D	PF	PA	PP	Pts	Qualification
1	North Melbourne (P)	12	12	0	0	868	270	321.5	48	Finals series
2	Melbourne	12	9	3	0	684	327	209.2	36	Finals series
3	Brisbane	12	9	3	0	652	403	161.8	36	Finals series
4	Hawthorn	12	9	3	0	451	433	104.2	36	Finals series
5	Carlton	12	8	4	0	554	474	116.9	32	Finals series
6	Adelaide	12	7	5	0	515	460	112.0	28	Finals series
7	St Kilda	12	7	5	0	392	407	96.3	28	Finals series
8	West Coast	12	6	6	0	472	423	111.6	24	Finals series
9	Sydney	12	6	6	0	542	504	107.5	24	
10	Port Adelaide	12	6	6	0	631	601	105.0	24	
11	Fremantle	12	6	6	0	414	512	80.9	24	
12	Western Bulldogs	12	5	7	0	415	358	115.9	20	
13	Geelong	12	5	7	0	500	539	92.8	20	
**14**	Essendon	**12**	**4**	**8**	**0**	**331**	**552**	**60.0**	16	
15	Collingwood	12	3	9	0	314	505	62.2	12	
16	Richmond	12	2	10	0	349	583	59.9	8	
17	Greater Western Sydney	12	2	10	0	401	681	58.9	8	
18	Gold Coast	12	2	10	0	319	772	41.3	8	

Source: afl.com.au
Rules for classification: 1) points; 2) percentage; 3) number of points for
(P) Premiers

== VFLW ==
=== Home-and-away season ===
Rd	Date and local time	Opponent	**Scores** (Essendon's scores indicated in **bold**)			Venue	Attendance	Position	Ref.
Rd	Date and local time	Opponent	Home	Away	Result	Venue	Attendance	Position	Ref.
1	Saturday, 19 April (4:05pm)	Port Melbourne	7.7 (49)	**4.6 (30)**	Lost by 19 points	ETU Stadium	—	—	
2	Saturday, 26 April (11:05am)	Collingwood	**10.4 (64)**	3.6 (24)	Won by 40 points	Windy Hill, Essendon	—	—	
3	Saturday, 3 May (11:05am)	North Melbourne	**5.5 (35)**	4.8 (32)	Won by 3 points	Windy Hill, Essendon	—	—	
4	Saturday, 10 May (2:35pm)	Carlton	**7.7 (49)**	3.4 (22)	Won by 27 points	Windy Hill, Essendon	—	—	
5	Saturday, 17 May (2:35pm)	Casey	5.6 (36)	**6.6 (42)**	Won by 6 points	Casey Fields	—	—	
6	Saturday, 24 May (1:05pm)	GC	3.6 (24)	**9.10 (64)**	Won by 40 points	Deakin University Elite Sports Precinct	—	—	
7	Saturday, 31 May (11:05am)	Box Hill	**3.7 (25)**	6.6 (42)	Lost by 17 points	Windy Hill, Essendon	—	—	
8	Saturday, 14 June (11:35am)	Collingwood	7.5 (47)	**6.3 (39)**	Lost by 8 points	Olympic Park Oval	—	—	
9	Saturday, 21 June (10:05am)	Williamstown	4.3 (27)	**0.11 (11)**	Lost by 16 points	Williamstown Cricket Ground	—	—	
10	Saturday, 28 June (11:05am)	Casey	**2.6 (18)**	10.13 (73)	Lost by 55 points	Windy Hill, Essendon	—	—	
11	Sunday, 6 July (11:05am)	Darebin	**3.2 (20)**	4.4 (28)	Lost by 8 points	Windy Hill, Essendon	—	—	
12	Saturday, 12 July (11:35am)	Box Hill	5.3 (33)	**8.7 (55)**	Won by 22 points	Box Hill City Oval	—	—	
13	Saturday, 19 July (11:05am)	Sandringham	**3.1 (19)**	2.2 (14)	Won by 5 points	Windy Hill, Essendon	—	—	
14	Friday, 1 August (7:05pm)	Western Bulldogs	5.4 (34)	**5.6 (36)**	Won by 2 points	Whitten Oval	—	—	
EF	Saturday, 9 August (11:35am)	Box Hill	4.4 (28)	**4.5 (29)**	Lost by 1 point	Box Hill City Oval	—	—	

=== Ladder ===
Pos	Team	Pld	W	L	D	PF	PA	PP	Pts	Qualification
1	North Melbourne Werribee	14	12	2	0	809	302	267.9	48	Finals series
2	Collingwood	14	10	4	0	607	441	137.6	40	Finals series
3	Box Hill	14	9	5	0	637	415	153.5	36	Finals series
4	Sandringham	14	8	5	1	414	395	104.8	34	Finals series
5	Williamstown	14	8	6	0	450	430	104.7	32	Finals series
6	Essendon	14	8	6	0	507	485	104.5	32	Finals series
7	Port Melbourne	14	7	6	1	559	446	125.3	30	
8	Darebin	14	7	7	0	388	431	90.0	28	
9	Western Bulldogs	14	5	9	0	386	541	71.3	20	
10	Carlton	14	4	10	0	398	549	72.5	16	
11	Geelong Cats	14	3	11	0	387	771	50.2	12	
12	Casey	14	2	12	0	384	720	53.3	8	

Rules for classification: 1) points; 2) percentage; 3) number of points for.
