= Angelica Gogos =

Australian rules footballer (born 1989)

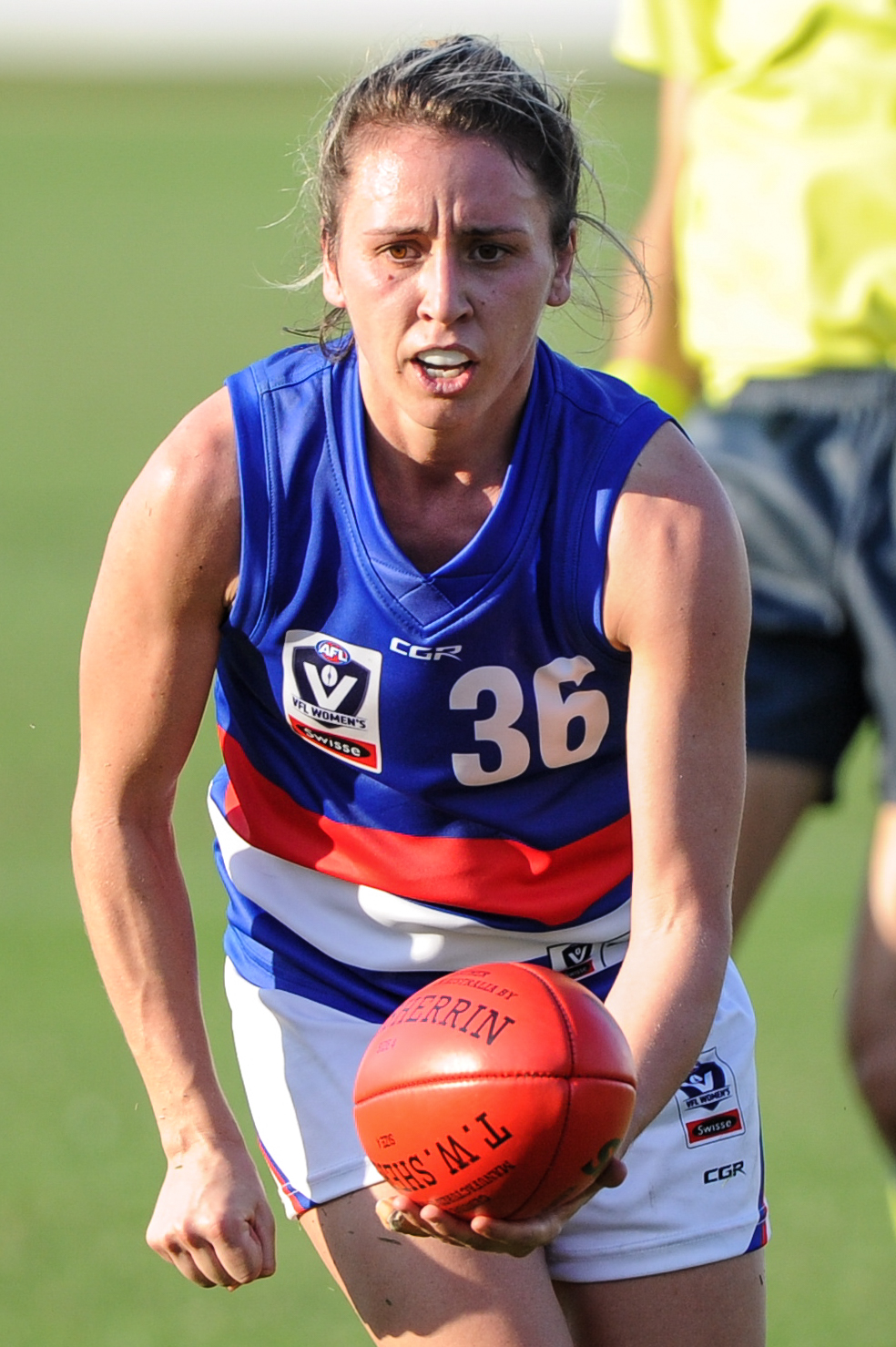
- Gogos in June 2018

Personal information
- Born: 3 September 1989 (age 37)
- Original team: Melbourne University (VFL Women's)
- Draft: 2016 free agent: Western Bulldogs
- Debut: Round 1, 2017, Western Bulldogs vs. Fremantle, at VU Whitten Oval
- Height: 156 cm (5 ft 1 in)
- Position: Midfielder

Playing career^{1}
Years	Club	Games (Goals)
2017–2021	Western Bulldogs	28 (1)
- ^{1} Playing statistics correct to the end of the 2021 season.

Career highlights
- AFL Women's premiership player: 2018

Angelica Gogos (born 3 September 1989) is an Australian rules footballer who played for the Western Bulldogs in the AFL Women's competition. Gogos was recruited by the Western Bulldogs as a free agent in November 2016. She made her debut in the thirty-two point win against Fremantle at VU Whitten Oval in the opening round of the 2017 season. In 2017 she was also a member of the Bulldogs premiership side. She played every match in her debut season to finish with seven matches overall. Gogos announced her retirement from the AFLW on 16 June 2021, citing continual injuries as the main cause.

She continued her football career at second-tier level, going on to play for the Darebin Falcons and winning the Lambert–Pearce Medal as the best and fairest player throughout the 2025 VFL Women's season.

== Statistics ==
Statistics are correct to the end of the 2021 season.

Legend
G	Goals	K	Kicks	D	Disposals	T	Tackles
B	Behinds	H	Handballs	M	Marks

Season	Team	No.	Games	Totals							Averages (per game)							Votes
Season	Team	No.	Games	G	B	K	H	D	M	T	G	B	K	H	D	M	T	Votes
2017	Western Bulldogs	36	7	1	2	26	27	53	1	43	0.1	0.3	3.7	3.9	7.6	0.1	6.1	0
2018^{#}	Western Bulldogs	36	8	0	0	34	44	78	7	50	0.0	0.0	4.3	5.5	9.8	0.9	6.3	0
2019	Western Bulldogs	36	7	0	0	39	14	53	2	42	0.0	0.0	5.6	2.0	7.6	0.3	6.0	0
2020	Western Bulldogs	36	3	0	0	15	9	24	4	10	0.0	0.0	5.0	3.0	8.0	1.3	3.3	0
2021	Western Bulldogs	36	3	0	0	23	0	23	7	9	0.0	0.0	7.7	0.0	7.7	2.3	3.0	0
Career			28	1	2	137	94	231	21	154	0.1	0.1	4.9	3.4	8.3	0.8	5.5	0
