= Southern Saints =

Australian rules football club

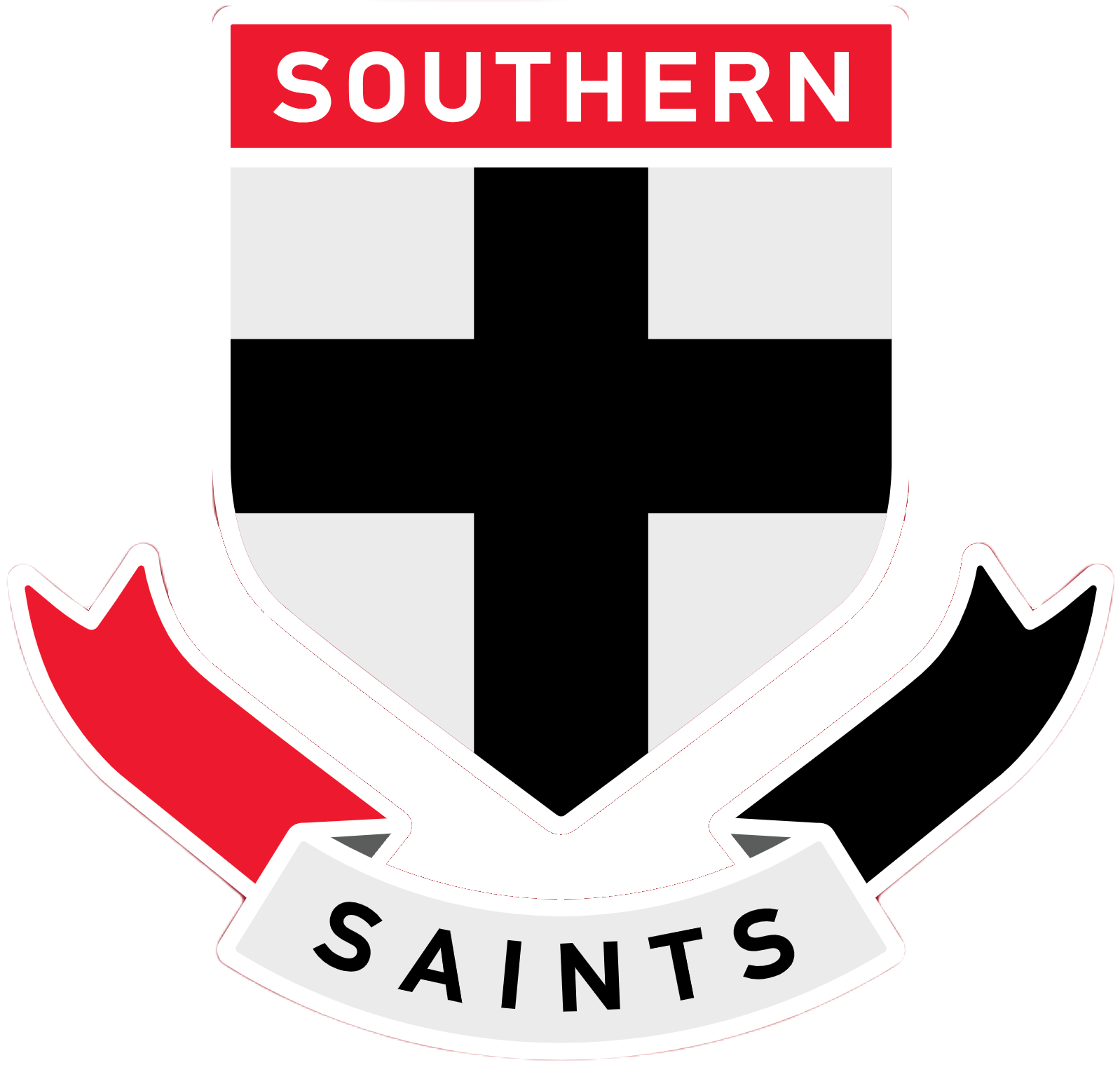

Names
- Full name: Sandringham Football Club
- Nickname(s): Saints, Sainters

2024 season
- Home-and-away season: 13th

Club details
- Founded: October 2017; 7 years ago
- Dissolved: 1 November 2024; 10 months ago
- Colours: Red; White; Black
- Competition: VFL Women's
- Coach: Michelle 'Alpha' Densley

Uniforms
Home

Other information
- Official website: sandringhamfc.com.au

Southern Saints was the name of an Australian rules football club that played in the VFL Women's (VFLW), the major state-level women's Australian rules football league in Victoria. It was affiliated with both the St Kilda Football Club, which competes in the Australian Football League (AFL), and the Sandringham Football Club, which competes in the Victorian Football League (VFL).

The club competed in the VFLW from 2019 until its brand was consolidated with Sandringham at the end of the 2024 season.

== History ==
The Southern Saints entered the VFLW in 2018, after the Seaford Football Club left the competition and had its licence transferred to the St Kilda Football Club.

In its first season, the club had an agreement with the Frankston Football Club. It finished 8th on the ladder at the end of the season.

In 2019, St Kilda and its VFL affiliate, Sandringham, co-managed the club. After St Kilda entered the AFL Women's competition in 2020, Sandringham took over the Southern Saints team licence and full responsibility for the commercial and operational management of the team.

The club's best season came in 2022, when it finished fifth on the home-and-away ladder. They lost in the grand final to Essendon, going down by 35 points.

On 28 October 2024, Sandringham announced that the Southern Saints would be known as the Sandringham Zebras (as of 1 November 2024), consolidating both identities under the one club for the 2025 season.

== Seasons ==
Premiers	Grand Finalist	Minor premiers	Finals appearance	Wooden spoon	VFLW leading goalkicker	Lambert–Pearce Medal

Year	League	Finish	W	L	D	Coach	Captain	Best and fairest	Leading goalkicker	Goals	Ref
2018	VFLW	8th	5	9	0						
2019	VFLW	2nd	11	3	0						
2020	VFLW	(No season)						(No season)			
2021	VFLW	6th	7	7	0	Dale Robinson	Frankie Hocking		Tara Bohanna	19	
2022	VFLW	5th	9	4	1	Dale Robinson	Deanna Jolliffe		Olivia Flanagan	10	
2023	VFLW	7th	8	6	0	Michelle 'Alpha' Densley	Ali Hynes; Tayla Kearns		Gabriella De Angelis	10	
2024	VFLW	13th	4	10	0	Michelle 'Alpha' Densley			Chloe Hunt	18	
