= 2024 VFL Women's season =

8th season of the VFL Women's

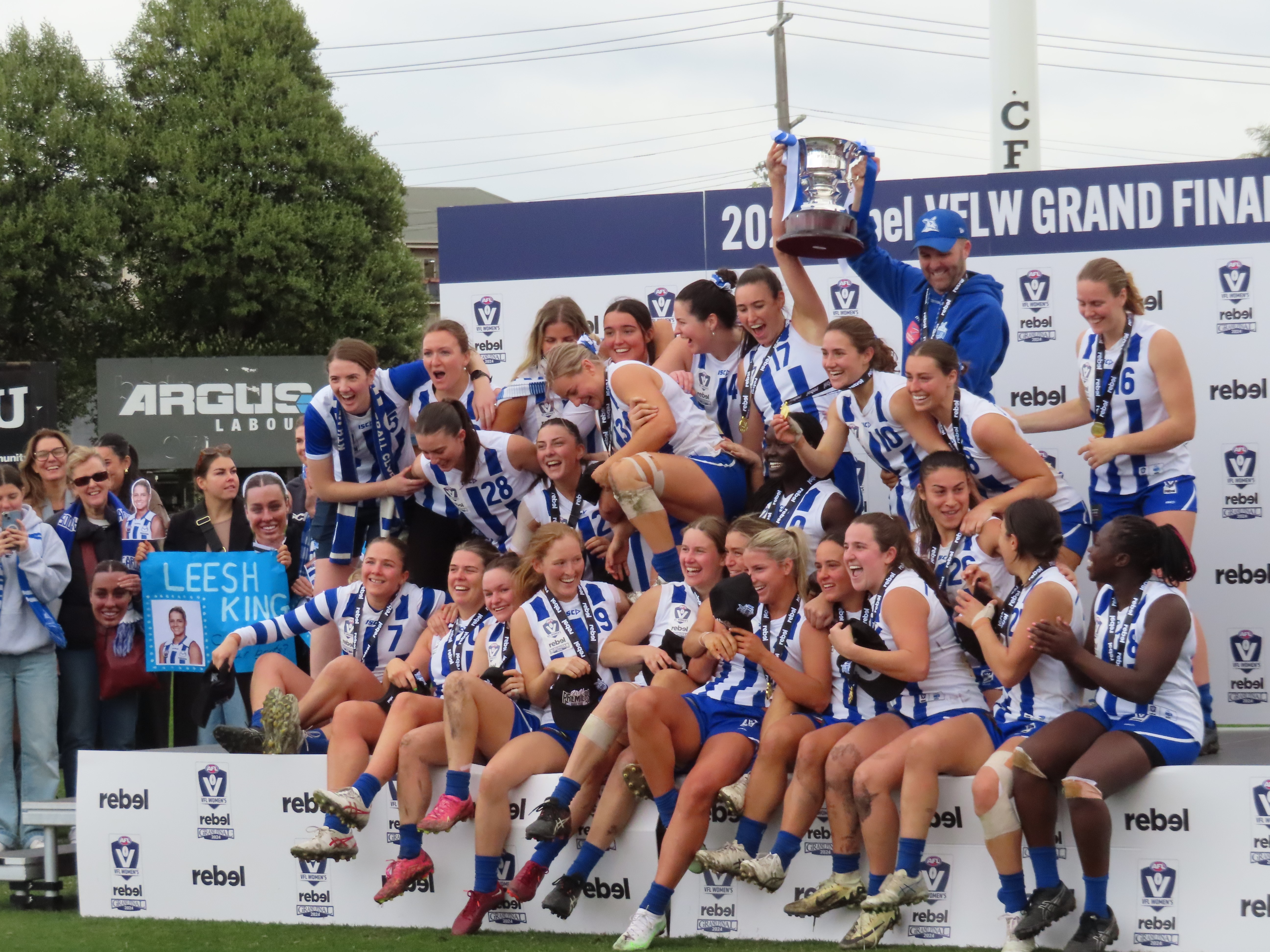
- Date: 22 March – 21 July 2024
- Teams: 12
- Premiers: North Melbourne; 1st premiership
- Runners-up: Western Bulldogs; 2nd runners-up result
- Minor premiers: Williamstown; 1st minor premiership
- Lambert–Pearce Medallist: Dominique Carbone (Western Bulldogs – 17 votes)
- Rohenna Young Medallist: Monique DeMatteo (Darebin – 24 goals)
- Matches played: 94

The 2024 VFL Women's season was the eighth season of the VFL Women's (VFLW), the state-level senior women's Australian rules football competition in Victoria. The season ran from 22 March to 21 July, comprising a home-and-away season, followed by a finals series featuring the top six clubs.

The season was contested by 12 clubs. It also included matches against New South Wales AFL Women's teams Greater Western Sydney and Sydney; the New South Wales teams were not premiership eligible, but there were premiership points available for the Victorian clubs in the matches. The NSW clubs each played five matches featuring many of their AFL Women's contracted players, with the two clubs using the VFLW competition to gain experience ahead of the 2024 AFL Women's season which began in August. The presence of the NSW clubs playing their AFLW-listed players differed from the Victorian clubs who chose not to play their AFLW-listed players in their VFLW programs citing the risk of injury. This resulted in some lop-sided results between the NSW teams and their opponents, with only Collingwood able to defeat Sydney, while the GWS Giants were undefeated in their matches.

Prior to the start of the season, there was speculation that Collingwood would affiliate with Williamstown for the 2024 VFLW season "as part of broader reviews from the AFL and the club into the direction of the VFLW". However, no affiliation agreement resulted from the reviews.

North Melbourne defeated Western Bulldogs in the Grand Final played at ETU Stadium, scoring a record high score of 10.8 (68) points against the Bulldogs 7.6 (48) to claim the club's first VFL Women's premiership.

== Coach appointments ==
New coach	Club	Date of appointment	Previous coach	Ref.
Lache Walker	Darebin	14 September 2023	Kate Tyndall	
Michael Ericson	Box Hill	November 2023	Cherie O'Neill	
Brett Gourley	North Melbourne	21 November 2023	Steph Binder	
Cherie O'Neill	Essendon	31 January 2024	Travis Cloke	

== Win/loss table ==
- Fixture list
- Home matches are in bold and opponents are listed above the margins.

Key
+	Win		Draw
-	Loss	X	Bye

Team	Home-and-away season														Finals series			
Team	1	2	3	4	5	6	7	8	9	10	11	12	13	14	FW1	FW2	FW3	GF
Box Hill	CAS +108	GEE +96	**COL** **+34**	**WIL** **+10**	**NM** **+50**	**SYD** **-63**	WB -25	**SS** **+11**	**DAR** **-8**	CAR +60	ESS -10	**GEE** **+90**	NM -9	PM; 0	**PM** **-18**			
Carlton	GEE +31	NM -21	**GWS** **-8**	COL -17	**PM** **+8**	WB -18	**GEE** **+3**	DAR -25	WIL -28	**BOX** **-60**	**CAS** **-10**	ESS +24	**SS** **+75**	**DAR** **-9**				
Casey	**BOX** **-108**	**WB** **-21**	NM +3	**PM** **+23**	SYD -85	SS +16	**WIL**; **0**	ESS -41	**GEE** **+13**	DAR -21	CAR +10	**COL** **-15**	WB -33	**SS** **-16**				
Collingwood	SS -8	PM -40	BOX -34	**CAR** **+17**	DAR +28	**ESS** **-17**	SYD +2	GEE +42	**WB** **-30**	**NM** **-5**	**SS** **-4**	CAS +15	**DAR** **+9**	**WIL** **-10**				
Darebin	**WIL** **-76**	SS -25	ESS -30	GEE -7	**COL** **-28**	WIL -38	**PM** **-8**	**CAR** **+25**	BOX +8	**CAS** **+21**	NM -6	**WB** **+18**	COL -9	CAR +9				
Essendon	**PM** **-47**	**WIL**; **0**	**DAR** **+30**	WB -2	**SS** **+9**	COL +17	GWS -47	**CAS** **+41**	NM -66	PM +12	**BOX** **+10**	**CAR** **-24**	WIL -18	**GEE** **+49**	NM -63			
Geelong Cats	**CAR** **-31**	**BOX** **-96**	SS +18	**DAR** **+7**	GWS -85	NM +24	CAR -3	**COL** **-42**	CAS -13	WIL -86	**WB** **-71**	BOX -90	**PM** **-47**	ESS -49				
Greater Western Sydney	X	X	CAR +8	**SS** **+62**	**GEE** **+85**	PM +25	**ESS** **+47**	X	X	X	X	X	X	X				
North Melbourne	WB +22	**CAR** **+21**	**CAS** **-3**	SYD -89	BOX -50	**GEE** **-24**	SS +1	WIL -4	**ESS** **+66**	COL +5	**DAR** **+6**	PM +11	**BOX** **+9**	**WB** **-7**	**ESS** **+63**	WIL +18	X	WB +20
Port Melbourne	ESS +47	**COL** **+40**	WIL +23	CAS -23	CAR -8	**GWS** **-25**	DAR +8	**WB** **-33**	SS +4	**ESS** **-12**	**WIL** **-2**	**NM** **-11**	GEE +47	**BOX**; **0**	BOX +18	WB -12		
Southern Saints	**COL** **+8**	**DAR** **+25**	**GEE** **-18**	GWS -62	ESS -9	**CAS** **-16**	**NM** **-1**	BOX -11	**PM** **-4**	WB -10	COL +4	**WIL** **-30**	CAR -75	CAS +16				
Sydney	X	X	WB +62	**NM** **+89**	**CAS** **+85**	BOX +63	**COL** **-2**	X	X	X	X	X	X	X				
Western Bulldogs	**NM** **-22**	CAS +21	**SYD** **-62**	**ESS** **+2**	WIL -21	**CAR** **+18**	**BOX** **+25**	PM +33	COL +30	**SS** **+10**	GEE +71	DAR -18	**CAS** **+33**	NM +7	WIL -18	**PM** **+12**	WIL +44	NM -20
Williamstown	DAR +76	ESS; 0	**PM** **-23**	BOX -10	**WB** **+21**	**DAR** **+38**	CAS; 0	**NM** **+4**	**CAR** **+28**	**GEE** **+86**	PM +2	SS +30	**ESS** **+18**	COL +10	**WB** **+18**	**NM** **-18**	WB -44	

== Ladder ==
Pos	Team	Pld	W	L	D	PF	PA	PP	Pts	Qualification
1	Williamstown	14	10	2	2	594	314	189.2	44	Finals series
2	Western Bulldogs	14	10	4	0	619	492	125.8	40	Finals series
3	Box Hill	14	8	5	1	734	390	188.2	34	Finals series
4	North Melbourne (P)	14	8	6	0	519	555	93.5	32	Finals series
5	Essendon	14	7	6	1	446	482	92.5	30	Finals series
6	Port Melbourne	14	6	7	1	458	403	113.6	26	Finals series
7	Collingwood	14	6	8	0	341	375	90.9	24	
8	Casey	14	5	8	1	457	732	62.4	22	
9	GWS Giants (E)	5	5	0	0	299	72	415.3	20	
10	Carlton	14	5	9	0	447	502	89.0	20	
11	Darebin	14	5	9	0	341	487	70.0	20	
12	Sydney Swans (E)	5	4	1	0	418	121	345.5	16	
13	Southern Saints	14	4	10	0	319	503	63.4	16	
14	Geelong Cats	14	3	11	0	287	851	33.7	12	

Source: AFL.com.au
Rules for classification: 1) points; 2) percentage; 3) number of points for.
(E) Club playing a limited number of exhibition matches, ineligible for progression to finals series; (P) Premiers

=== Progression by round ===
Numbers highlighted in green indicate that the team finished the round inside the top 6.
Numbers highlighted in blue indicates the team finished first on the ladder in that round.
Numbers highlighted in red indicates the team finished in last place on the ladder in that round.
Underlined numbers indicate that the team had a bye during that round.

Team ╲ Round	1	2	3	4	5	6	7	8	9	10	11	12	13	14
Box Hill	4	8	12	16	20	20	20	24	24	28	28	32	32	34
Carlton	4	4	4	4	8	8	12	12	12	12	12	16	20	20
Casey	0	0	4	8	8	12	14	14	18	18	22	22	22	22
Collingwood	0	0	0	4	8	8	12	16	16	16	16	20	24	24
Darebin	0	0	0	0	0	0	0	4	8	12	12	16	16	20
Essendon	0	2	6	6	10	14	14	18	18	22	26	26	26	30
Geelong Cats	0	0	4	8	8	12	12	12	12	12	12	12	12	12
Greater Western Sydney	−	−	4	8	12	16	20	–	−	−	−	−	−	−
North Melbourne	4	8	8	8	8	8	12	12	16	20	24	28	32	32
Port Melbourne	4	8	12	12	12	12	16	16	20	20	20	20	24	26
Southern Saints	4	8	8	8	8	8	8	8	8	8	12	12	12	16
Sydney	−	−	4	8	12	16	16	−	−	−	−	−	−	−
Western Bulldogs	0	0	4	8	8	12	16	20	24	28	32	32	36	40
Williamstown	4	6	6	6	10	14	16	20	24	28	32	36	40	44

Source: AFL.com.au

== Finals series ==
Match-ups set using the second McIntyre final six system.

Qualifying final
30 June, DSV Stadium
1	Williamstown	7.3 (45)
2	Western Bulldogs	4.3 (27)
Elimination finals
29 June, Fenjiu Stadium
3	Box Hill	4.7 (31)
6	Port Melbourne	7.7 (49)
30 June, Arden Street Oval
4	North Melbourne	12.4 (76)
5	Essendon	2.1 (13)

Semi-finals
7 July, DSV Stadium
Williamstown	5.5 (35)
North Melbourne	8.5 (53)
6 July, Mission Whitten Oval
Western Bulldogs	5.4 (34)
Port Melbourne	3.4 (22)

Preliminary final
14 July, ETU Stadium
Williamstown	2.4 (16)
Western Bulldogs	9.6 (60)

Grand final
21 July, ETU Stadium
North Melbourne	10.8 (68)
Western Bulldogs	7.6 (48)

=== Qualifying and elimination finals ===
	Qualifying final
Sunday, 30 June (2:00 pm)	Williamstown 7.3 (45)	def.	Western Bulldogs 4.3 (27)	DSV Stadium	Report

	Elimination finals
Saturday, 29 June (11:30 am)	Box Hill 4.7 (31)	def. by	Port Melbourne 7.7 (49)	Fenjiu Stadium	Report
Sunday, 30 June (1:00 pm)	North Melbourne 12.4 (76)	def.	Essendon 2.1 (13)	Arden Street Oval	Report

=== Semi finals ===
	Semi finals
Saturday, 6 July (1:00 pm)	Western Bulldogs 5.4 (34)	def.	Port Melbourne 3.4 (22)	Mission Whitten Oval	Report
Sunday, 7 July (2:00 pm)	Williamstown 5.5 (35)	def. by	North Melbourne 8.5 (53)	DSV Stadium	Report

=== Preliminary final ===
	Preliminary final
Sunday, 14 July (12:30 pm)	Williamstown 2.4 (16)	def. by	Western Bulldogs 9.6 (60)	ETU Stadium	Report

=== Grand Final ===
2024 VFLW Grand Final
Sunday, 21 July (12:10 pm)	North Melbourne	def.	Western Bulldogs	ETU Stadium (crowd: 2,500)	Report
4.2 (26); 6.4 (40); 6.6 (42); 10.8 (68)	Q1; Q2; Q3; Final	0.1 (1); 2.4 (16); 6.6 (42); 7.6 (48)	Umpires: G. Devenish, A. Bailes, N. Walsh; Lisa Hardeman Medal: Nyakoat Dojiok (North Melbourne); Television broadcast: Seven Network; National anthem: Kane Worthy and Jessica Aiezza
N. Dojiok 4 E. Paterno 2 A. Barba, M. Di Cosmo, G. Nicholas, A. Rhodes	Goals	M. Clifford, R. Saulitis, M. McLeod, I. Milford, T. Pulcino, J. Tabb, K. Hardingham
N. Dojiok, A. Rhodes, A. Barba, M. Di Cosmo, M. McSweeney, K. Reynolds, N. Hales	Best	D. Carbone, K. Hardingham, T. Hurst, C. Ugle, T. Pulcino, J. Tabb
North Melbourne won their first VFL Women's premiership, scoring a record high score in a VFLW Grand Final. North Melbourne had led by 32 points before the Western Bulldogs levelled the scores in the third quarter.; Nyakoat Dojiok (North Melbourne) won the Lisa Hardeman Medal as best-on-ground, kicking three goals in the first half, adding a fourth in the final quarter.

Grand Final gallery

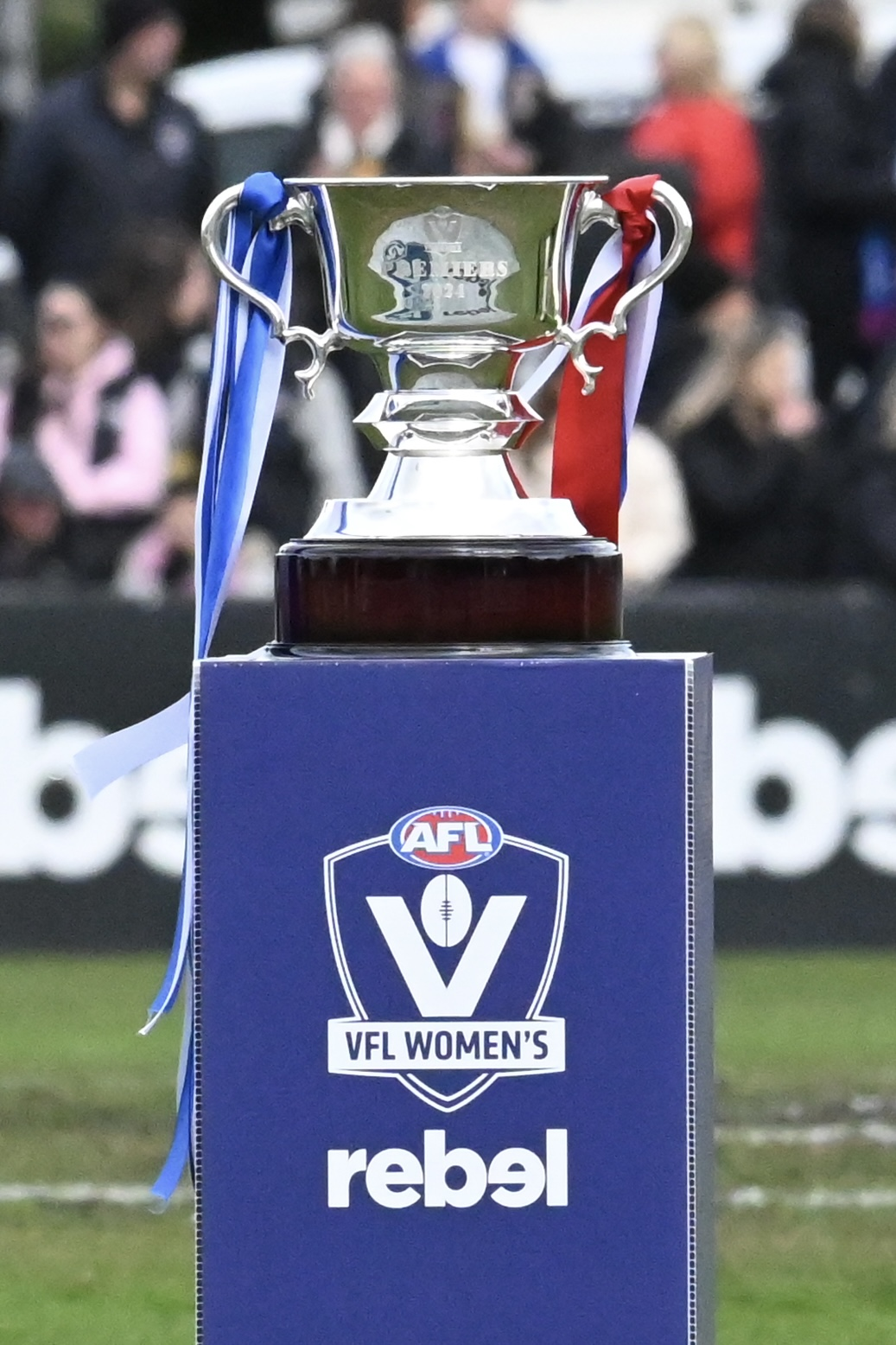
The 2024 VFLW premiership cup

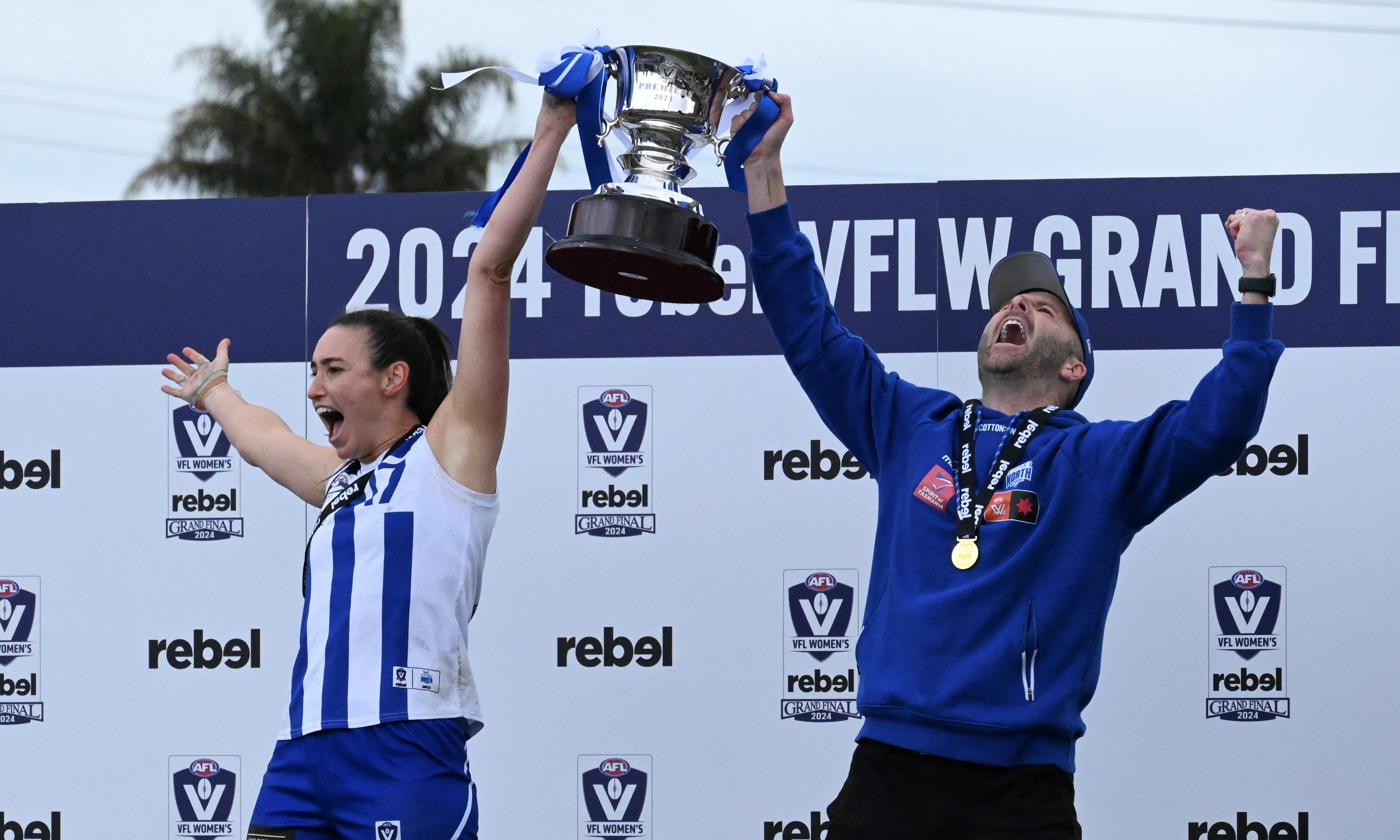
Captain Jess Jones (L) and coach Brett Gourley (R) celebrate with the premiership cup

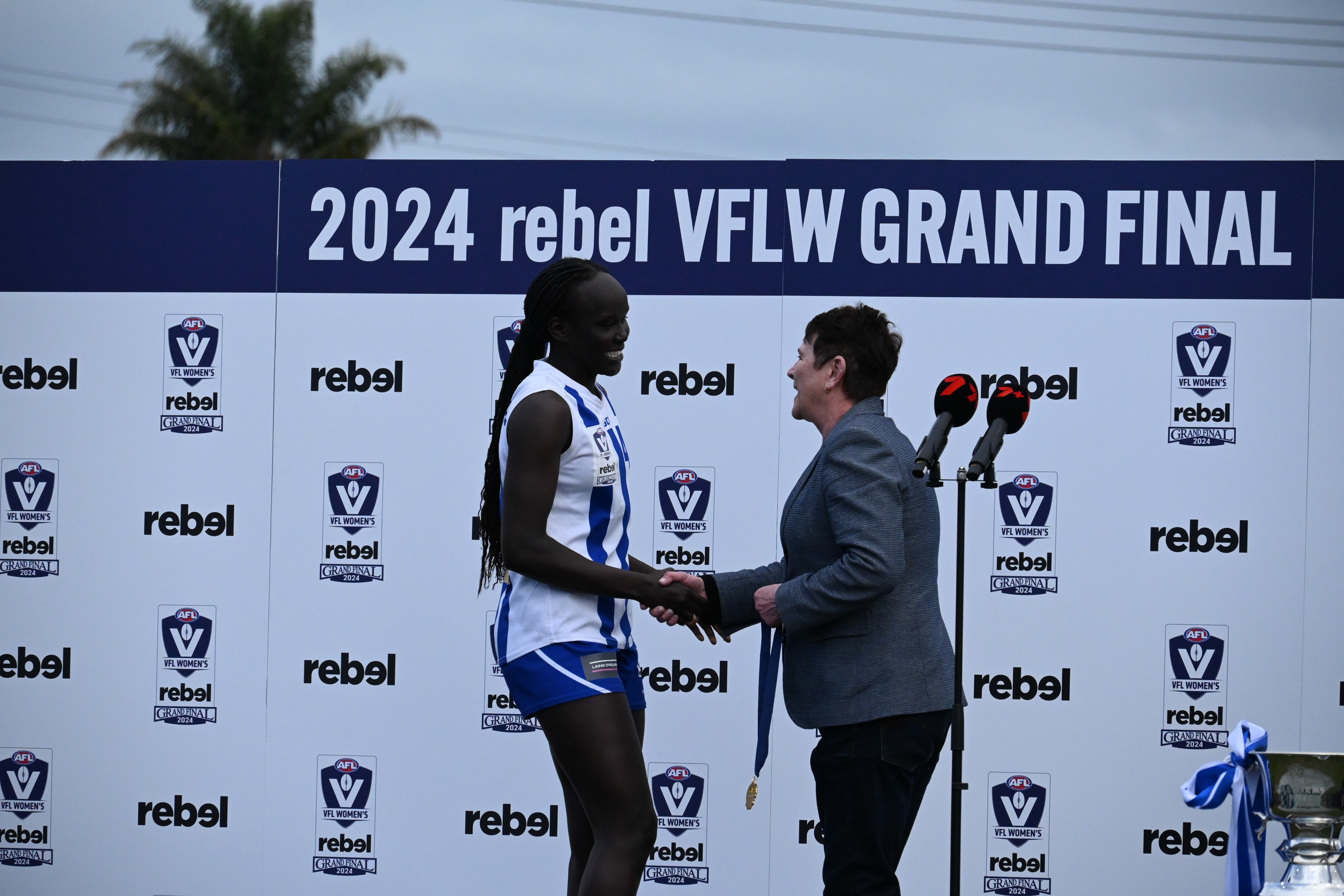
Lisa Hardeman (R) presented Nyakoat Dojiok (L) with the Lisa Hardeman Medal for best on field

== Awards ==
- Lambert–Pearce Medal (Best and Fairest): Dominique Carbone (Western Bulldogs) – 17 votes
- Rohenna Young Medal (Leading Goal kicker): Monique DeMatteo (Darebin) – 24 goals
- Debbie Lee Medal (Rising Star): Keeley Hardingham (Western Bulldogs)
- Coaches MVP: Ange Gogos (Darebin)
- Coach of the Year: Brett Gourley (North Melbourne)
- Lisa Hardeman Medal (Best on ground VFL Women's Grand Final): Nyakoat Dojiok (North Melbourne)

2024 VFL Women's Team of the Year
B:	Lori Stepnell (Williamstown)	Nicole Hales (North Melbourne)	
HB:	Meg MacDonald (Casey)	Tessa Boyd (Southern Saints)	Lauren Caruso (Port Melbourne)
C:	Caitlin Thorne (Box Hill)	Ange Gogos (Darebin)	Charlotte Ryan (Southern Saints)
HF:	Sharnie Whiting (Williamstown)	Monique DeMatteo (Darebin)	Jaimi Tabb (Western Bulldogs)
F:	Eliza Stratford (c) (Williamstown)	Nyakoat Dojiok (North Melbourne)	
Foll:	Keeley Hardingham (Western Bulldogs)	Dominique Carbone (Western Bulldogs)	Alana Barba (North Melbourne)
Int:	Maddie Di Cosmo (North Melbourne)	Maddison Ford (Essendon)	Tamara Luke (Box Hill)
Int:	Audrey Rhodes (North Melbourne)	Ava Seton (Port Melbourne)	
Coach:	Brett Gourley (North Melbourne)		

=== Club best and fairest winners ===
Club	Best & Fairest	Ref
Box Hill	Tamara Luke	
Carlton	Eliza Wood	
Casey	Meg Macdonald	
Collingwood	Katie Day	
Darebin	Ange Gogos	
Essendon	El Chaston	
Geelong Cats	Lily Jordan	
North Melbourne	Maddie Di Cosmo	
Port Melbourne	Ava Seton	
Southern Saints	Charlotte Ryan	
Western Bulldogs	Keeley Hardingham	
Williamstown	Megan Williamson	
Williamstown	Emily Eaves	

== See also ==
- 2024 VFL season
- 2024 AFL Women's season
