= 2025 VFL Women's season =

9th season of the VFL Women's

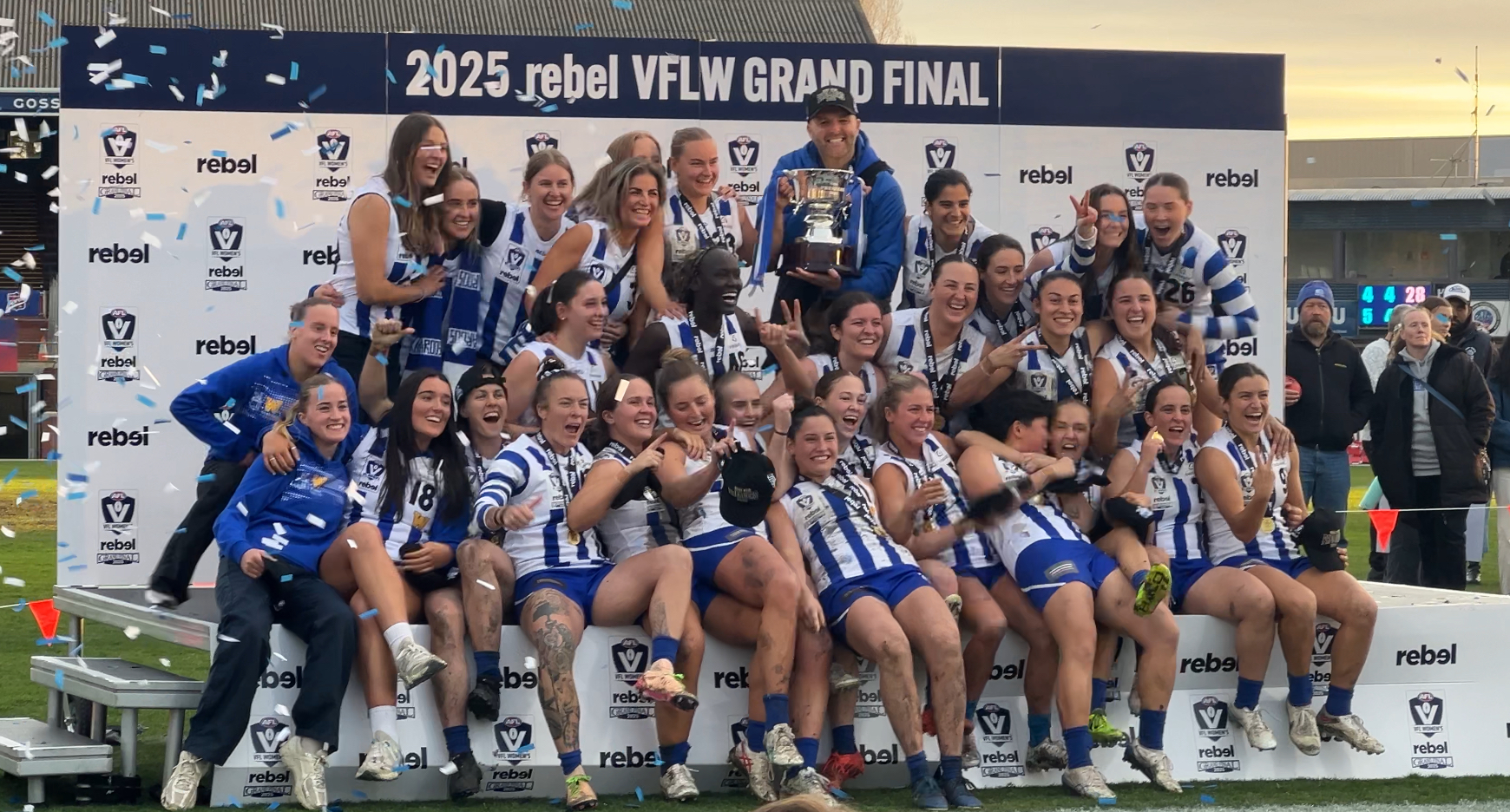
- Date: 19 April – 30 August 2025
- Teams: 12
- Premiers: North Melbourne Werribee; 2nd premiership
- Runners-up: Collingwood; 2nd runners-up result
- Minor premiers: North Melbourne Werribee; 1st minor premiership
- Lambert–Pearce Medallist: Angelica Gogos (Darebin – 25 votes)
- Rohenna Young Medallist: Nyakoat Dojiok (North Melbourne Werribee – 37 goals)
- Matches played: 91

The 2025 VFL Women's season was the ninth season of the VFL Women's (VFLW), the state-level senior women's Australian rules football competition in Victoria. The season began on 19 April and concluded on 30 August.

North Melbourne Werribee won the premiership for the second time and the second consecutive year, defeating Collingwood by six points in the 2025 VFLW Grand Final.

== Background ==
=== League membership ===
On 28 October 2024, the Sandringham Football Club announced that the Southern Saints would be known as the Sandringham Zebras (as of 1 November 2024), consolidating the identities of its men's and women's teams under the one club for the 2025 season. The Saints were formed ahead of the 2018 VFLW season and were managed by the St Kilda Football Club until 2020.

On 21 February 2025, Richmond announced it would not renew its affiliation agreement with Port Melbourne for the 2025 VFLW season, with Port Melbourne instead competing as a standalone club. The affiliation had been in place since the 2021 VFLW season.

Reigning premiers North Melbourne entered into an affiliation with VFL club Werribee, becoming known as the North Melbourne Werribee Kangaroos and playing up to four games a season at Chirnside Park.

Unlike the previous season, the two NSW-based AFL Women's teams were not fixtured to take part in any matches against VFL Women's teams.

=== Fixture dates ===
Beginning this season, the VFLW season was played between April and August, instead of March to July. The change occurred after the Australian Football League (AFL) announced that the AFL Women's season would commence the week beginning 11 August 2025, two weeks earlier than in previous years. The 2025 season fixture was announced in February 2025.

== Clubs ==
=== Venues and affiliations ===
| Club | Home venue(s) | Capacity | AFLW affiliation |
|---|---|---|---|
| Box Hill | Box Hill City Oval | 10,000 | Hawthorn |
| Box Hill | Wonthaggi Recreation Reserve | 10,000 | Hawthorn |
| Carlton | IKON Park | 13,000 | Carlton |
| Casey | Casey Fields | 9,000 | Melbourne |
| Collingwood | AIA Vitality Centre | 3,500 | Collingwood |
| Collingwood | Victoria Park | 10,000 | Collingwood |
| Darebin | Genis Steel Oval | 5,000 | —N/a |
| Essendon | NEC Hangar | 3,500 | Essendon |
| Essendon | Windy Hill | 10,000 | Essendon |
| Geelong Cats | Deakin University | 10,000 | Geelong |
| Geelong Cats | KFC Oval | | Geelong |
| North Melbourne Werribee | Arden Street Oval | 4,000 | North Melbourne |
| North Melbourne Werribee | Avalon Airport Oval | 8,000 | North Melbourne |
| Port Melbourne | ETU Stadium | 6,000 | —N/a |
| Sandringham | RSEA Park | 8,000 | St Kilda |
| Sandringham | WS Trevor Barker Beach Oval | 6,000 | St Kilda |
| Western Bulldogs | Mission Whitten Oval | 10,000 | Western Bulldogs |
| Williamstown | DSV Stadium | 6,000 | —N/a |

=== Coach appointments ===
| New coach | Club | Date of appointment | Previous coach | Ref |
|---|---|---|---|---|
| Lachlan Harris | Sandringham | 6 September 2024 | Michelle Densley | |
| Tom Chitsos | Port Melbourne | 9 September 2024 | Sean Buncle | |
| Taylah Hassett | Geelong Cats | 10 December 2024 | Elise Coventry | |
| Aasta O'Connor | Carlton | 21 February 2025 | Glenn Strachan | |

=== Club leadership ===
| Club | Coach | Leadership group | | | Ref |
| Club | Coach | Captain(s) | Vice-captain(s) | Other leader(s) | Ref |
|---|---|---|---|---|---|
| Box Hill | Michael Ericson | Ellie McLinden | Rosie Dillon | Mietta Kendall, Gabby Collingwood, Maddi Torpey | |
| Carlton | Aasta O'Connor | Octavia Di Donato (Note: Eliza Wood was Carlton's captain until 2 April 2025 (17 days before the first match of the 2025 season) when she was signed to Carlton's AFL Women's (AFLW) list.) | Amy Trindade, Steph Demeo | | |
| Casey | Matt Brewer | Ally Kirkwood, Meg Macdonald | | | |
| Collingwood | Tom Cashin | Dominique Carbone | Lauren Szigeti | Erin McKinnon, Amelia Peck, Jordan Ivey | |
| Darebin | Lache Walker | Caitlin Bunker | Riley Christgoergl | Alyssa Mifsud, Stephanie Simpson, Lulu Beatty | |
| Essendon | Cherie O'Neill | El Chaston | Sophie Molan | Sarah Ford, Ashlea Melnikas, Christina Bernardi | |
| Geelong Cats | Taylah Hassett | Mel Staunton | Abby Favell | Madi Sexton, Liv Stewart, Poppy Schaap | |
| North Melbourne Werribee | Brett Gourley | Renee Tierney | Maddie Di Cosmo | Mara McSweeney, Kate Reynolds, Tessa Boyd | |
| Port Melbourne | Tom Chitsos | Eloise Ashley-Cooper, Olivia Barton | | Lauren Caruso, Molly Denahy Maloney, Lily Hart | |
| Sandringham | Lachie Harris | Grace Hodder | Erica Fowler | Ali Hynes, Tayla Kearns, Bella Enno, Beth Pinchin | |
| Western Bulldogs | Rhys Cahir | Stephanie Asciak | Jaimi Tabb, Bri McFarlane, Millie Klingbeil | Mali McLeod, Mary Sandral | |
| Williamstown | Liam Kavanagh | Eliza Straford | Emily Eaves | Zoe Day, Megan Williamson, Eloise Freeman, Phoebe Chisholm, Jemima Wrigley, Gaby De Angelis | |

== Home-and-away season ==
=== Round 1 ===
| | Round 1 |
| Friday, 18 April (9:15am) | North Melbourne Werribee 9.11 (65) | def. | Carlton 2.5 (17) | Arden Street Oval | Report |
| Saturday, 19 April (11:05am) | Sandringham 8.5 (53) | def. | Darebin 3.3 (21) | Trevor Barker Beach Oval | Report |
| Saturday, 19 April (11:05am) | Geelong Cats 4.6 (30) | def. by | Box Hill 14.4 (88) | Deakin University | Report |
| Saturday, 19 April (2:35pm) | Casey 3.1 (19) | def. by | Collingwood 7.5 (47) | Casey Fields | Report |
| Saturday, 19 April (4:05pm) | Port Melbourne 7.7 (49) | def. | Essendon 4.6 (30) | ETU Stadium | Report |
| Sunday, 20 April (11:05am) | Western Bulldogs 2.6 (18) | def. by | Williamstown 4.4 (28) | Mission Whitten Oval | Report |

=== Round 2 ===
| | Round 2 |
| Friday, 25 April (10:35am) | North Melbourne Werribee 6.8 (44) | def. | Williamstown 4.1 (25) | Arden Street Oval | Report |
| Saturday, 26 April (10:05am) | Western Bulldogs 6.6 (42) | def. | Darebin 3.3 (21) | Mission Whitten Oval | Report |
| Saturday, 26 April (11:05am) | Essendon 10.4 (64) | def. | Collingwood 3.6 (24) | Windy Hill | Report |
| Saturday, 26 April (12:05pm) | Geelong Cats 4.5 (29) | def. by | Carlton 7.6 (48) | Deakin University | Report |
| Saturday, 26 April (2:05pm) | Sandringham 4.2 (26) | def. | Casey 3.6 (24) | RSEA Park | Report |
| Sunday, 27 April (2:35pm) | Box Hill 5.10 (40) | def. | Port Melbourne 5.4 (34) | Wonthaggi Recreation Reserve | Report |

=== Round 3 ===
| | Round 3 |
| Saturday, 3 May (10:05am) | Collingwood 4.2 (26) | def. by | Western Bulldogs 6.13 (49) | Victoria Park | Report |
| Saturday, 3 May (10:35am) | Darebin 1.1 (7) | def. by | Port Melbourne 8.5 (53) | Genis Steel Oval | Report |
| Saturday, 3 May (11:05am) | Essendon 5.5 (35) | def. | North Melbourne Werribee 4.8 (32) | Windy Hill | Report |
| Saturday, 3 May (11:35am) | Box Hill 11.9 (75) | def. | Casey 3.7 (25) | Box Hill City Oval | Report |
| Saturday, 3 May (1:05pm) | Carlton 2.2 (14) | def. by | Sandringham 2.6 (18) | Ikon Park | Report |
| Saturday, 3 May (6:15pm) | Williamstown 10.4 (64) | def. | Geelong Cats 2.5 (17) | DSV Stadium | Report |

=== Round 4 ===
| | Round 4 |
| Saturday, 10 May (10:35am) | Darebin 3.8 (26) | def. | Collingwood 3.5 (23) | Genis Steel Oval | Report |
| Saturday, 10 May (11:05am) | Geelong Cats 2.5 (17) | def. by | Sandringham 10.6 (66) | Deakin University | Report |
| Saturday, 10 May (2:35pm) | Essendon 7.7 (49) | def. | Carlton 3.4 (22) | Windy Hill | Report |
| Saturday, 10 May (2:35pm) | Western Bulldogs 11.13 (79) | def. | Casey 2.2 (14) | Mission Whitten Oval | Report |
| Sunday, 11 May (11:05am) | North Melbourne Werribee 9.7 (61) | def. | Box Hill 4.3 (27) | Arden Street Oval | Report |
| Sunday, 11 May (2:05pm) | Williamstown 4.3 (27) | def. by | Port Melbourne 5.7 (37) | DSV Stadium | Report |
This was the first time in VFLW history that Darebin had defeated Collingwood.

=== Round 5 ===
| | Round 5 |
| Saturday, 17 May (12:35pm) | Carlton 2.4 (16) | def. by | Darebin 7.4 (46) | Ikon Park | Report |
| Saturday, 17 May (2:05pm) | North Melbourne Werribee 6.7 (43) | def. | Western Bulldogs 3.4 (22) | Arden Street Oval | Report |
| Saturday, 17 May (2:05pm) | Collingwood 4.3 (27) | def. | Box Hill 3.7 (25) | Victoria Park | Report |
| Saturday, 17 May (2:35pm) | Casey 5.6 (36) | def. by | Essendon 6.6 (42) | Casey Fields | Report |
| Saturday, 17 May (2:05pm) | Port Melbourne 9.7 (61) | def. | Geelong Cats 0.4 (4) | ETU Stadium | Report |
| Sunday, 18 May (9:45am) | Sandringham 4.4 (28) | def. by | Williamstown 4.5 (29) | Trevor Barker Beach Oval | Report |

=== Round 6 ===
| | Round 6 |
| Saturday, 24 May (10:35am) | Darebin 8.10 (58) | def. | Casey 2.2 (14) | Genis Steel Oval | Report |
| Saturday, 24 May (1:05pm) | Geelong Cats 3.6 (24) | def. by | Essendon 9.10 (64) | Deakin University | Report |
| Saturday, 24 May (2:35pm) | Box Hill 8.8 (56) | def. | Western Bulldogs 3.4 (22) | Box Hill City Oval | Report |
| Sunday, 25 May (10:05am) | Collingwood 7.4 (46) | def. | North Melbourne Werribee 5.3 (33) | Victoria Park | Report |
| Sunday, 25 May (11:05am) | Carlton 3.3 (21) | def. by | Williamstown 5.3 (33) | Ikon Park | Report |
| Sunday, 25 May (2:05pm) | Sandringham 4.0 (24) | drew with | Port Melbourne 3.6 (24) | Trevor Barker Beach Oval | Report |

=== Round 7 ===
| | Round 7 |
| Saturday, 31 May (11:05am) | Essendon 3.7 (25) | def. by | Box Hill 6.6 (42) | Windy Hill | Report |
| Saturday, 31 May (12:05pm) | Casey 2.4 (16) | def. by | Carlton 9.2 (56) | Casey Fields | Report |
| Saturday, 31 May (12:05pm) | Collingwood 8.13 (61) | def. | Sandringham 1.2 (8) | Victoria Park | Report |
| Saturday, 31 May (3:05pm) | Darebin 7.4 (46) | def. | Geelong Cats 3.3 (21) | Genis Steel Oval | Report |
| Sunday, 1 June (9:35am) | Williamstown 2.1 (13) | def. | Western Bulldogs 1.0 (6) | DSV Stadium | Report |
| Sunday, 1 June (11:05am) | Port Melbourne 2.3 (15) | def. by | North Melbourne Werribee 6.6 (42) | ETU Stadium | Report |
The Darebin vs Geelong Cats match, which was scheduled to be played at RMIT Oval in Bundoora, was moved to Genis Steel Oval.

=== Round 8 ===
| | Round 8 |
| Saturday, 14 June (11:05am) | Western Bulldogs 5.3 (33) | def. | Port Melbourne 3.5 (23) | Mission Whitten Oval | Report |
| Saturday, 14 June (11:05am) | Casey 3.5 (23) | def. by | Williamstown 6.4 (40) | Casey Fields | Report |
| Saturday, 14 June (11:35am) | Collingwood 7.5 (47) | def. | Essendon 6.3 (39) | AIA Vitality Centre | Report |
| Saturday, 14 June (11:35am) | Box Hill 6.7 (43) | def. | Darebin 1.5 (11) | Box Hill City Oval | Report |
| Saturday, 14 June (2:45pm) | North Melbourne Werribee 17.8 (110) | def. | Geelong Cats 3.4 (22) | Avalon Airport Oval | Report |
| Sunday, 15 June (11:05am) | Sandringham 6.7 (43) | def. | Carlton 2.3 (15) | Trevor Barker Beach Oval | Report |

=== Round 9 ===
| | Round 9 |
| Saturday, 21 June (10:05am) | Williamstown 4.3 (27) | def. | Essendon 0.11 (11) | DSV Stadium | Report |
| Saturday, 21 June (11:05am) | Port Melbourne 4.2 (26) | def. by | Collingwood 8.5 (53) | ETU Stadium | Report |
| Saturday, 21 June (12:05pm) | Casey 5.6 (36) | def. by | Box Hill 7.6 (48) | Casey Fields | Report |
| Saturday, 21 June (12:05pm) | North Melbourne Werribee 7.12 (54) | def. | Darebin 2.2 (14) | Arden Street Oval | Report |
| Saturday, 21 June (1:05pm) | Western Bulldogs 1.7 (13) | def. by | Sandringham 6.6 (42) | Mission Whitten Oval | Report |
| Sunday, 22 June (11:05am) | Carlton 2.2 (14) | def. by | Geelong Cats 8.8 (56) | Ikon Park | Report |
The Western Bulldogs vs Sandringham match was moved from 11:05am to 1:05pm.

=== Round 10 ===
| | Round 10 |
| Saturday, 28 June (10:05am) | Williamstown 1.6 (12) | def. by | North Melbourne Werribee 4.9 (33) | DSV Stadium | Report |
| Saturday, 28 June (10:35am) | Darebin 1.4 (10) | def. by | Sandringham 2.3 (15) | Genis Steel Oval | Report |
| Saturday, 28 June (11:05am) | Essendon 2.6 (18) | def. by | Casey 10.13 (73) | Windy Hill | Report |
| Saturday, 28 June (11:35am) | Box Hill 3.5 (23) | def. by | Collingwood 4.10 (34) | Box Hill City Oval | Report |
| Saturday, 28 June (12:35pm) | Carlton 2.4 (16) | def. by | Port Melbourne 12.4 (76) | Ikon Park | Report |
| Saturday, 28 June (1:05pm) | Geelong Cats 8.9 (57) | def. | Western Bulldogs 5.4 (34) | Deakin University | Report |

=== Round 11 ===
| | Round 11 |
| Friday, 4 July (7:35pm) | Western Bulldogs 0.2 (2) | def. by | North Melbourne Werribee 9.10 (64) | Mission Whitten Oval | Report |
| Saturday, 5 July (10:05am) | Collingwood 5.7 (37) | def. by | Carlton 6.5 (41) | Victoria Park | Report |
| Saturday, 5 July (10:05am) | Port Melbourne 9.4 (58) | def. | Williamstown 4.3 (27) | ETU Stadium | Report |
| Sunday, 6 July (11:05am) | Casey 8.7 (55) | def. | Geelong Cats 4.5 (29) | Casey Fields | Report |
| Sunday, 6 July (11:05am) | Essendon 3.2 (20) | def. by | Darebin 4.4 (28) | Windy Hill | Report |
| Sunday, 6 July (11:35am) | Box Hill 11.8 (74) | def. | Sandringham 1.3 (13) | Box Hill City Oval | Report |
Carlton's Keeley Skepper kicked a goal as the final siren sounded to defeat Collingwood.

=== Round 12 ===
| | Round 12 |
| Saturday, 12 July (10:05am) | Collingwood 8.9 (57) | def. | Casey 1.5 (11) | Victoria Park | Report |
| Saturday, 12 July (11:35am) | Box Hill 5.3 (33) | def. by | Essendon 8.7 (55) | Box Hill City Oval | Report |
| Saturday, 12 July (12:35pm) | Carlton 15.6 (96) | def. | Western Bulldogs 1.3 (9) | Ikon Park | Report |
| Saturday, 12 July (1:00pm) | North Melbourne Werribee 16.6 (102) | def. | Port Melbourne 3.2 (20) | Arden Street Oval | Report |
| Saturday, 12 July (2:05pm) | Sandringham 6.3 (39) | def. | Geelong Cats 5.2 (32) | Trevor Barker Beach Oval | Report |
| Sunday, 13 July (10:35am) | Darebin 6.2 (38) | def. | Williamstown 5.4 (34) | Genis Steel Oval | Report |

=== Round 13 ===
| | Round 13 |
| Saturday, 19 July (10:35am) | Darebin 5.6 (36) | def. | Carlton 2.3 (15) | Genis Steel Oval | Report |
| Saturday, 19 July (11:05am) | Essendon 3.1 (19) | def. | Sandringham 2.2 (14) | Windy Hill | Report |
| Saturday, 19 July (1:05pm) | Geelong Cats 3.3 (21) | def. by | Collingwood 9.2 (56) | Deakin University | Report |
| Saturday, 19 July (4:05pm) | Port Melbourne 3.4 (22) | def. by | Western Bulldogs 3.5 (23) | ETU Stadium | Report |
| Sunday, 20 July (10:05am) | Casey 3.2 (20) | def. by | North Melbourne Werribee 12.12 (84) | Casey Fields | Report |
| Sunday, 20 July (11:05am) | Williamstown 5.5 (35) | def. | Box Hill 3.9 (27) | DSV Stadium | Report |

=== Round 14 ===
| | Round 14 |
| Friday, 1 August (7:05pm) | Carlton 1.1 (7) | def. by | Box Hill 4.12 (36) | Ikon Park | Report |
| Friday, 1 August (7:05pm) | Western Bulldogs 5.4 (34) | def. | Essendon 5.6 (36) | Mission Whitten Oval | Report |
| Saturday, 2 August (10:05am) | Williamstown 9.2 (56) | def. by | Collingwood 11.3 (69) | DSV Stadium | Report |
| Saturday, 2 August (10:05am) | Port Melbourne 8.13 (61) | def. | Casey 3.0 (18) | ETU Stadium | Report |
| Sunday, 2 August (9:45am) | Sandringham 4.1 (25) | def. by | North Melbourne Werribee 5.12 (42) | Trevor Barker Beach Oval | Report |
| Sunday, 2 August (1:05pm) | Geelong Cats 3.10 (28) | def. | Darebin 3.8 (26) | KFC Oval | Report |

== Ladder ==
| Pos | Team | Pld | W | L | D | PF | PA | PP | Pts | Qualification |
|---|---|---|---|---|---|---|---|---|---|---|
| 1 | North Melbourne Werribee | 14 | 12 | 2 | 0 | 809 | 302 | 267.9 | 48 | Finals series |
| 2 | Collingwood | 14 | 10 | 4 | 0 | 607 | 441 | 137.6 | 40 | Finals series |
| 3 | Box Hill | 14 | 9 | 5 | 0 | 637 | 415 | 153.5 | 36 | Finals series |
| 4 | Sandringham | 14 | 8 | 5 | 1 | 414 | 395 | 104.8 | 34 | Finals series |
| 5 | Williamstown | 14 | 8 | 6 | 0 | 450 | 430 | 104.7 | 32 | Finals series |
| 6 | Essendon | 14 | 8 | 6 | 0 | 507 | 485 | 104.5 | 32 | Finals series |
| 7 | Port Melbourne | 14 | 7 | 6 | 1 | 559 | 446 | 125.3 | 30 | |
| 8 | Darebin | 14 | 7 | 7 | 0 | 388 | 431 | 90.0 | 28 | |
| 9 | Western Bulldogs | 14 | 5 | 9 | 0 | 386 | 541 | 71.3 | 20 | |
| 10 | Carlton | 14 | 4 | 10 | 0 | 398 | 549 | 72.5 | 16 | |
| 11 | Geelong Cats | 14 | 3 | 11 | 0 | 387 | 771 | 50.2 | 12 | |
| 12 | Casey | 14 | 2 | 12 | 0 | 384 | 720 | 53.3 | 8 | |

Rules for classification: 1) points; 2) percentage; 3) number of points for.

=== Progression by round ===
Numbers highlighted in green indicate that the team finished the round inside the top 6.
Numbers highlighted in blue indicates the team finished first on the ladder in that round.
Numbers highlighted in red indicates the team finished in last place on the ladder in that round.
Underlined numbers indicate that the team had a bye during that round.

| Team ╲ Round | 1 | 2 | 3 | 4 | 5 | 6 | 7 | 8 | 9 | 10 | 11 | 12 | 13 | 14 |
|---|---|---|---|---|---|---|---|---|---|---|---|---|---|---|
| Box Hill | 4 | 8 | 12 | 12 | 12 | 16 | 20 | 24 | 28 | 28 | 32 | 32 | 32 | 36 |
| Carlton | 0 | 4 | 4 | 4 | 4 | 4 | 8 | 8 | 8 | 8 | 12 | 26 | 16 | 16 |
| Casey | 0 | 0 | 0 | 0 | 0 | 0 | 0 | 0 | 0 | 4 | 8 | 8 | 8 | 8 |
| Collingwood | 4 | 4 | 4 | 4 | 8 | 12 | 16 | 20 | 24 | 28 | 28 | 32 | 36 | 40 |
| Darebin | 0 | 0 | 0 | 4 | 8 | 12 | 16 | 16 | 16 | 16 | 20 | 24 | 28 | 28 |
| Essendon | 0 | 4 | 8 | 12 | 16 | 20 | 20 | 20 | 20 | 20 | 20 | 24 | 28 | 32 |
| Geelong Cats | 0 | 0 | 0 | 0 | 0 | 0 | 0 | 0 | 4 | 8 | 8 | 8 | 8 | 12 |
| North Melbourne Werribee | 4 | 8 | 8 | 12 | 16 | 16 | 20 | 24 | 28 | 32 | 36 | 40 | 44 | 48 |
| Port Melbourne | 4 | 4 | 8 | 12 | 16 | 18 | 18 | 18 | 18 | 22 | 26 | 26 | 26 | 30 |
| Sandringham | 4 | 8 | 12 | 16 | 16 | 18 | 18 | 22 | 26 | 30 | 30 | 34 | 34 | 34 |
| Western Bulldogs | 0 | 4 | 8 | 12 | 12 | 12 | 12 | 16 | 16 | 16 | 16 | 16 | 20 | 20 |
| Williamstown | 4 | 4 | 8 | 8 | 12 | 16 | 20 | 24 | 28 | 28 | 28 | 28 | 32 | 32 |

Source: AFL

=== Win/loss table ===
- Fixture list
- Home matches are in bold and opponents are listed above the margins.

Key
| + | Win | | Draw |
| - | Loss | X | Bye |

| Team | Home-and-away season | | | | | | | | | | | | | | Finals series | | | |
| Team | 1 | 2 | 3 | 4 | 5 | 6 | 7 | 8 | 9 | 10 | 11 | 12 | 13 | 14 | FW1 | FW2 | FW3 | GF |
|---|---|---|---|---|---|---|---|---|---|---|---|---|---|---|---|---|---|---|
| Box Hill | GEE +58 | **PM** **+6** | **CAS** **+50** | NM -34 | COL -2 | **WB** **+34** | ESS +17 | **DAR** **+32** | CAS +12 | **COL** **-11** | **SAN** **+61** | **ESS** **-22** | WIL -8 | CAR +29 | **ESS** **+1** | COL -25 | **NM** | |
| Carlton | NM -48 | GEE +19 | **SAN** **-4** | ESS -27 | **DAR** **-30** | **WIL** **-12** | CAS +40 | SAN -28 | **GEE** **-42** | **PM** **-60** | COL +4 | **WB** **+87** | DAR -21 | **BOX** **-29** | | | | |
| Casey | **COL** **-28** | SAN -2 | BOX -50 | WB -65 | **ESS** **-6** | DAR -44 | **CAR** **-40** | **WIL** **-17** | **BOX** **-12** | ESS +55 | **GEE** **+26** | COL -46 | **NM** **-64** | PM -43 | | | | |
| Collingwood | CAS +28 | ESS -40 | **WB** **-23** | DAR -3 | **BOX** **+2** | **NM** **+13** | **SAN** **+53** | **ESS** **+8** | PM +27 | BOX +11 | **CAR** **-4** | **CAS** **+46** | GEE +35 | WIL +13 | NM +13 | **BH** **+25** | X | TBC |
| Darebin | SAN -32 | WB -21 | **PM** **-46** | **COL** **+3** | CAR +30 | **CAS** **+44** | **GEE** **+25** | HAW -32 | NM -40 | **SAN** **-5** | ESS +8 | **WIL** **+4** | **CAR** **+21** | GEE -2 | | | | |
| Essendon | PM -19 | **COL** **+40** | **NM** **+3** | **CAR** **+27** | CAS +6 | GEE +40 | **BOX** **-17** | COL -8 | WIL -16 | **CAS** **-55** | **DAR** **-8** | BOX +22 | **SAN** **+5** | WB +2 | BOX -1 | | | |
| Geelong Cats | **BOX** **-58** | **CAR** **-19** | WIL -47 | **SAN** **-49** | PM -57 | **ESS** **-40** | DAR -25 | NM -88 | CAR +42 | **WB** **+23** | CAS -26 | SAN -7 | **COL** **-35** | **DAR** **+2** | | | | |
| North Melbourne Werribee | **CAR** **+48** | **WIL** **+19** | ESS -3 | **BOX** **+34** | **WB** **+21** | COL -13 | PM +27 | **GEE** **+88** | **DAR** **+40** | WIL +21 | WB +62 | **PM** **+82** | CAS +64 | SAN +17 | **COL** **-13** | **WIL** **+24** | BH | |
| Port Melbourne | **ESS** **+19** | BOX -6 | DAR +46 | WIL +10 | **GEE** **+57** | SAN; 0 | **NM** **-27** | WB -10 | **COL** **-27** | CAR +60 | **WIL** **+31** | NM -82 | **WB** **-1** | **CAS** **+43** | | | | |
| Sandringham | **DAR** **+32** | **CAS** **+2** | CAR +4 | GEE +49 | **WIL** **-1** | **PM**; **0** | COL -53 | **CAR** **+28** | WB +29 | DAR +5 | BOX -61 | **GEE** **+7** | ESS -5 | **NM** **-17** | WIL -12 | | | |
| Western Bulldogs | **WIL** **-10** | **DAR** **+21** | COL +23 | **CAS** **+65** | NM -21 | BOX -34 | WIL -7 | **PM** **+10** | **SAN** **-29** | GEE -23 | **NM** **-62** | CAR -87 | PM +1 | **ESS** **-2** | | | | |
| Williamstown | WB +10 | NM -19 | **GEE** **+47** | **PM** **-10** | SAN +1 | CAR +12 | **WB** **+7** | CAS +17 | **ESS** **+16** | **NM** **-21** | PM -31 | DAR -4 | **BOX** **+8** | **COL** **-13** | SAN +12 | NM -24 | | |

== Finals series ==
Match-ups set using the second McIntyre final six system.

Qualifying final
9 August, Arden Street Oval
1 | North Melbourne Werribee | 4.8 (32)
2 | Collingwood | 7.3 (45)
Elimination finals
9 August, Box Hill City Oval
3 | Box Hill | 4.5 (29)
6 | Essendon | 4.4 (28)
9 August, Trevor Barker Beach Oval
4 | Sandringham | 0.6 (6)
5 | Williamstown | 2.6 (18)

Semi-finals
16 August, ETU Stadium
Collingwood | 6.5 (41)
Box Hill | 2.4 (16)
17 August, Arden Street Oval
North Melbourne Werribee | 4.17 (41)
Williamstown | 2.5 (17)

Preliminary final
23 August, Kinetic Stadium
Box Hill | 6.5 (41)
North Melbourne Werribee | 9.8 (62)

Grand final
30 August, ETU Stadium
Collingwood | 4.4 (28)
North Melbourne Werribee | 5.4 (34)

=== Qualifying and elimination finals ===
| | Qualifying final |
| Saturday, 9 August (2:35 pm) | North Melbourne Werribee 4.8 (32) | def. by | Collingwood 7.3 (45) | Arden Street Oval | Report |

| | Elimination finals |
| Saturday, 9 August (11:05 am) | Sandringham 0.6 (6) | def. by | Williamstown 2.6 (18) | Trevor Barker Beach Oval | Report |
| Saturday, 9 August (11:35 am) | Box Hill 4.5 (29) | def. | Essendon 4.4 (28) | Box Hill City Oval | Report |

=== Semi finals ===
| | Semi finals |
| Saturday, 16 August (10:05am) | Collingwood 6.5 (41) | def. | Box Hill 2.4 (16) | ETU Stadium | Report |
| Sunday, 17 August (12:05pm) | North Melbourne Werribee 4.17 (41) | def. | Williamstown 2.5 (17) | Arden Street Oval | Report |

=== Preliminary final ===
| | Preliminary final |
| Saturday, 23 August (12:05pm) | Box Hill 6.5 (41) | def. by | North Melbourne Werribee 9.8 (62) | Kinetic Stadium | Report |

=== Grand Final ===
2025 VFLW Grand Final
Saturday, 30 August (3:10 pm) | Collingwood | def. by | North Melbourne Werribee | ETU Stadium
1.1 (7); 3.2 (20); 4.4 (28); 4.4 (28) | Q1; Q2; Q3; Final | 3.0 (18); 3.2 (20); 4.2 (26); 5.4 (34) | Lisa Hardeman Medal: Alana Barba (North Melbourne Werribee); Television broadcast: AFL.com.au
T Christensen 2 A Peck, B Clarke 1 | Goals | S Reid 3 N Dojiok 2

== Awards ==
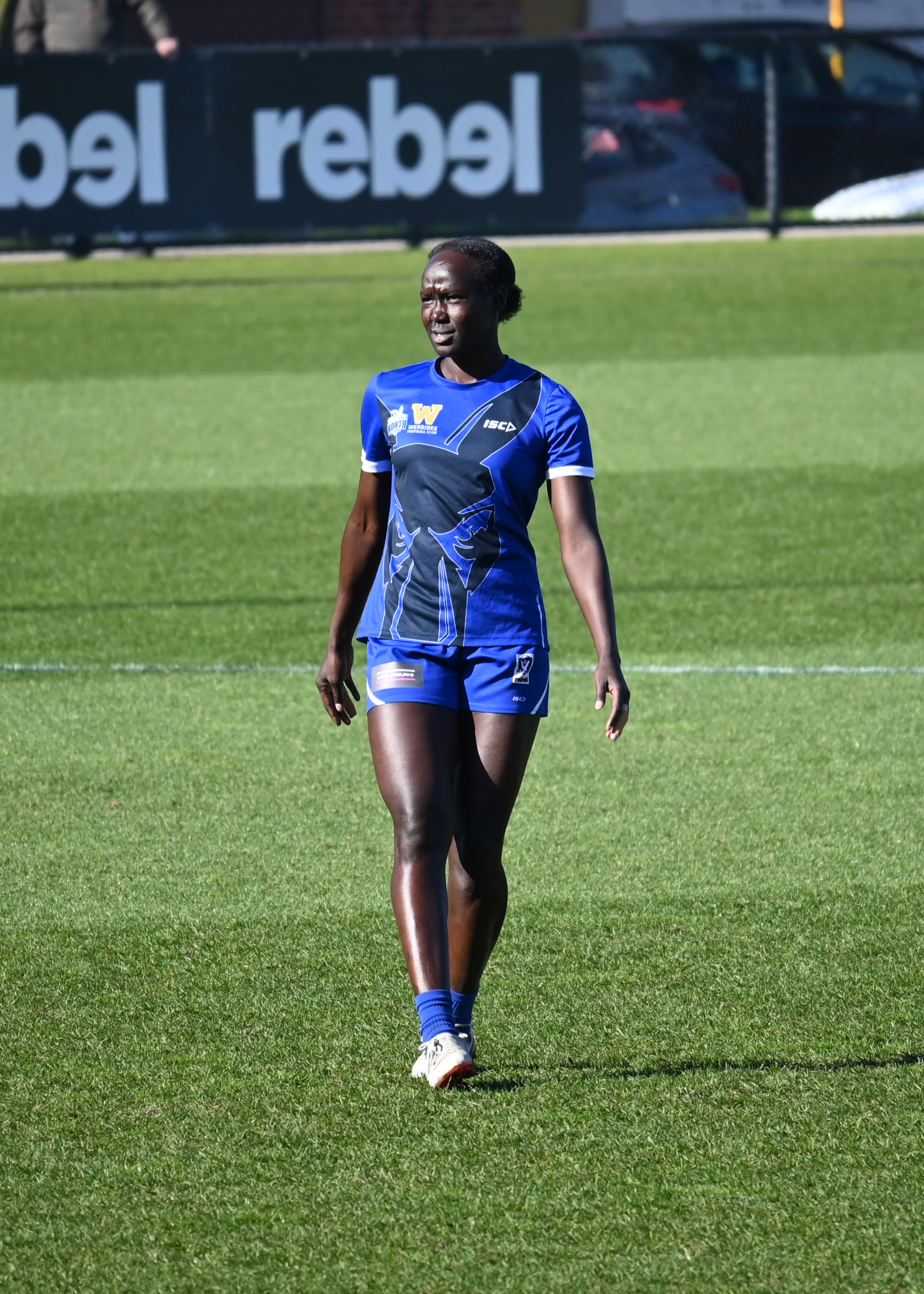
North Melbourne Werribee forward Nyakoat Dojiok won the Rohenna Young Medal after kicking 37 goals during the home-and-away season

- Lambert–Pearce Medal (league best and fairest): Ange Gogos (Darebin) – 25 votes
- Rohenna Young Medal (leading goalkicker): Nyakoat Dojiok (North Melbourne Werribee) – 37 goals
- Debbie Lee Medal (rising star): Tahlia Sanger (Collingwood)
- Coaches MVP: Emily Eaves (Williamstown) & Ange Gogos (Darebin) – 77 votes each

=== Team of the Year ===
2025 VFL Women's Team of the Year
| B: | Stella Reid (North Melbourne Werribee) | Sarah Sansonetti (Western Bulldogs) | |
| HB: | El Chaston (Essendon) | Matilda Van Berkel (Box Hill) | Jemma Wrigley (Williamstown) |
| C: | Brooke Plummer (Essendon) | Maddie Di Cosmo (North Melbourne Werribee) | Charlotte Ryan (North Melbourne Werribee) |
| HF: | Courtney Jones (Collingwood) | Amelia Peck (Collingwood) | Gabby Collingwood (Box Hill) |
| F: | Kaitlyn O'Keefe (Port Melbourne) | Nyakoat Dojiok (North Melbourne Werribee) | |
| Foll: | Paige Price (Box Hill) | Tahlia Sanger (Collingwood) | Ange Gogos (Darebin) |
| Int: | Alana Barba (North Melbourne Werribee) | Charlotte Brewer (Collingwood/Carlton) | Emily Eaves (Williamstown) |
| Int: | Renee Tierney (North Melbourne Werribee) | Lily-Rose Williamson (Collingwood) | |
| Coach: | Brett Gourley (North Melbourne Werribee) | | |

=== Club best and fairest ===
| Club | Winner | Ref |
|---|---|---|
| Box Hill | Matilda Van Berkel | |
| Carlton | Amy Trindade | |
| Casey | Meg Macdonald | |
| Collingwood | Dominique Carbone | |
| Darebin | Ange Gogos | |
| Essendon | El Chaston | |
| Geelong Cats | Hayley Peck | |
| North Melbourne Werribee | Maddie Di Cosmo | |
| Port Melbourne | Ava Seton | |
| Sandringham | Grace Hodder | |
| Western Bulldogs | Jaimi Tabb | |
| Williamstown | Emily Eaves | |

== Representative match ==
Announced in February 2025, the competition's best VFLW-listed players were selected in a team to play against the SANFL Women's League during the 2025 AFL Gather Round in South Australia. It was the first time since the formation of the competition in 2017 that a state league representative fixture was played.

A 50-player squad was announced in late March, with the team coached by 2024 North Melbourne premiership coach Brett Gourley. The squad included 13 members of the 2024 VFLW Team of the Year.

2025 AAMI State Game
Friday, 11 April (18:30 ACST) | SANFLW | def. by | VFLW | Alberton Oval, Adelaide | Report
0.1 (1); 1.6 (7); 2.11 (23); 4.12 (36) | Q1; Q2; Q3; Final | 4.2 (26); 7.2 (44); 8.5 (53); 9.9 (63) | Television broadcast: afl.com.au
L. Breguet, K. Lee, C. Leuzzi, K. Rosenzweig | Goals | T. Fellows 4 L. Williamson 2 E. Chaston, N. Dojiok, S. Whiting
C. Leuzzi, J. Bates, L. Ebert, Z. Venning, M. Anderson, T. King | Best | T. Fellows, A. Barba, D. Carbone, L. Williamson, E. Chaston, S. Casey

=== Final team ===
VFLW State Team
| B: | 16. Sophie Casey; (Casey) | 12. Gen Lawson-Tavan; (North Melbourne Werribee) | |
| HB: | 26. El Chaston; (Essendon) | 1. Lauren Caruso; (Port Melbourne) | 28. Lauren Brazzale (vc); (Sandringham) |
| C: | 15. Meg MacDonald; (Casey) | 13. Lauren Szigeti; (Collingwood) | 10. Ava Seton; (Port Melbourne) |
| HF: | 9. Abbey McDonald; (Essendon) | 18. Tahlia Fellows; (Collingwood) | 27. Jaimi Tabb; (Western Bulldogs) |
| F: | 31. Nyakoat Dojiok; (North Melbourne Werribee) | 50. Sharnie Whiting; (Williamstown) | |
| Foll: | 30. Maddison Torpey; (Box Hill) | 25. Alana Barba; (North Melbourne Werribee) | 7. Dominique Carbone (c); (Collingwood) |
| Int: | 19. Tessa Boyd; (North Melbourne Werribee) | 29. Maddie Di Cosmo; (North Melbourne Werribee) | 36. Lauren Jatczak; (Casey) |
| Int: | 17. Stella Reid; (North Melbourne Werribee) | 14. Lily-Rose Williamson; (Collingwood) | 4. Tamsin Crook; (Western Bulldogs) |
| Coach: | Brett Gourley (North Melbourne Werribee) | | |

== See also ==
- 2025 VFL season
