= The Hangar =

Training ground of Essendon Football Club

Coordinates: 37°41′26″S 144°52′8″E

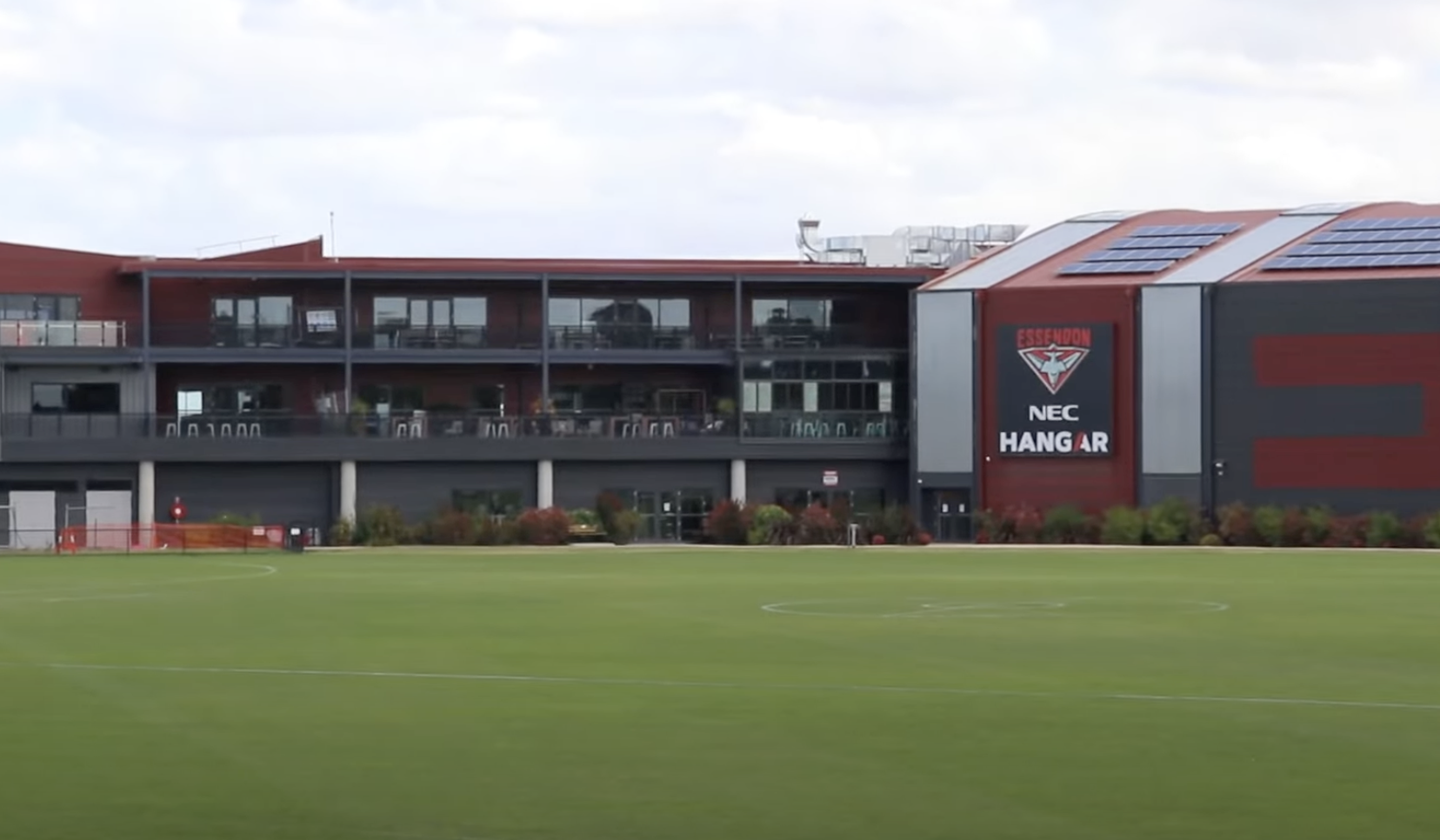
- Interactive map of The Hangar
- Operator: Essendon Football Club
- Capacity: 3,500
- Surface: Grass

Construction
- Groundbreaking: 2011; 15 years ago
- Opened: 18 November 2013; 12 years ago

Tenants
- Essendon Football Club; Administration & Training (2013–present); Western United FC (2021–2024)

The Hangar (known under naming rights as the NEC Hangar) is an Australian rules football venue that serves as the training facility and headquarters of the Essendon Football Club. It is located in the north-west Melbourne suburb of Melbourne Airport and was opened in 2013.

== History ==
Essendon began planning on moving its primary training and administrative facilities to a larger and more spacious facility near Melbourne Airport in May 2011. The club received $6 million in support from the federal government and sought a similar amount from the State Government. With the total cost of the proposed project expected to be around $30 million, the club considered petitioning the Australian Football League (AFL) and club members for the remaining funding. For almost 90 years, Essendon had been based at Windy Hill Oval in the suburb of Essendon, though by 2010 the club had outgrown the restricted space and so signed an agreement with airport authorities to utilise the vacant land for a training facility. The club ultimately raised $14 million towards the project in conjunction with the Australian Paralympic Committee, and received $4.75 million from the AFL and $1.8 million from the State Government. Essendon signed a 37-year lease at Melbourne Airport, and moved its primary training and administrative base to the facility in October 2013. The facility officially opened on 18 November 2013.

The facility doubles as the Victorian offices and training precinct of Paralympics Australia, which secured $4 million in federal funding in early 2019 to assist in the construction of the Community, Education and Events Centre at the site. The facilities in use since opening include large locker rooms for players, an indoor aquatic centre, a running track, a gymnasium, medical and administration offices, and two football ovals, one the size of the Melbourne Cricket Ground and the other the size of Docklands Stadium. The venue's most obvious facility is the 60-metre long, 40-metre wide indoor training hall, commonly utilised by players for warm-up and warm-down procedures. Since the completion of the Community, Education and Events Centre in December 2021, the facility has also featured a women’s football performance and training centre, accessible facilities for paralympic athletes, community change-room and match facilities, a health clinic and classrooms, a public atrium, cafe, an extensive sports museum and club shop.

The facility had limited use during 2020 as a result of COVID-19 pandemic with Essendon being forced to relocate to Queensland. The venue hosted its first competitive match on 28 February 2021, when Essendon's VFLW team were defeated by the Southern Saints on the main oval.

From 2021 until 2024, A-League Men club Western United FC had utilised the Hangar as their training and administration base while their facilities at Ironbark Fields were under construction. Western United trained on the alternate oval more commonly utilised by the public, while also utilising the indoor sports training and administrative facilities that Essendon share with the club and Paralympics Australia.

== Naming ==
For several years after opening the venue was simply known as the High Performance Centre, or by the sponsored name True Value Solar Centre. In December 2017, the Essendon Football Club unveiled the new name of the facility; The Hangar. The club's members were given the opportunity to decide the name via an online vote on the club website and chose The Hangar by a clear margin. In 2020, NEC Australia became a sponsor of the Essendon Football Club seeing the facility renamed the NEC Hangar in a naming rights deal.

== See also ==
- Windy Hill
