= Luamon Lual =

Australian rules footballer (born 2005)

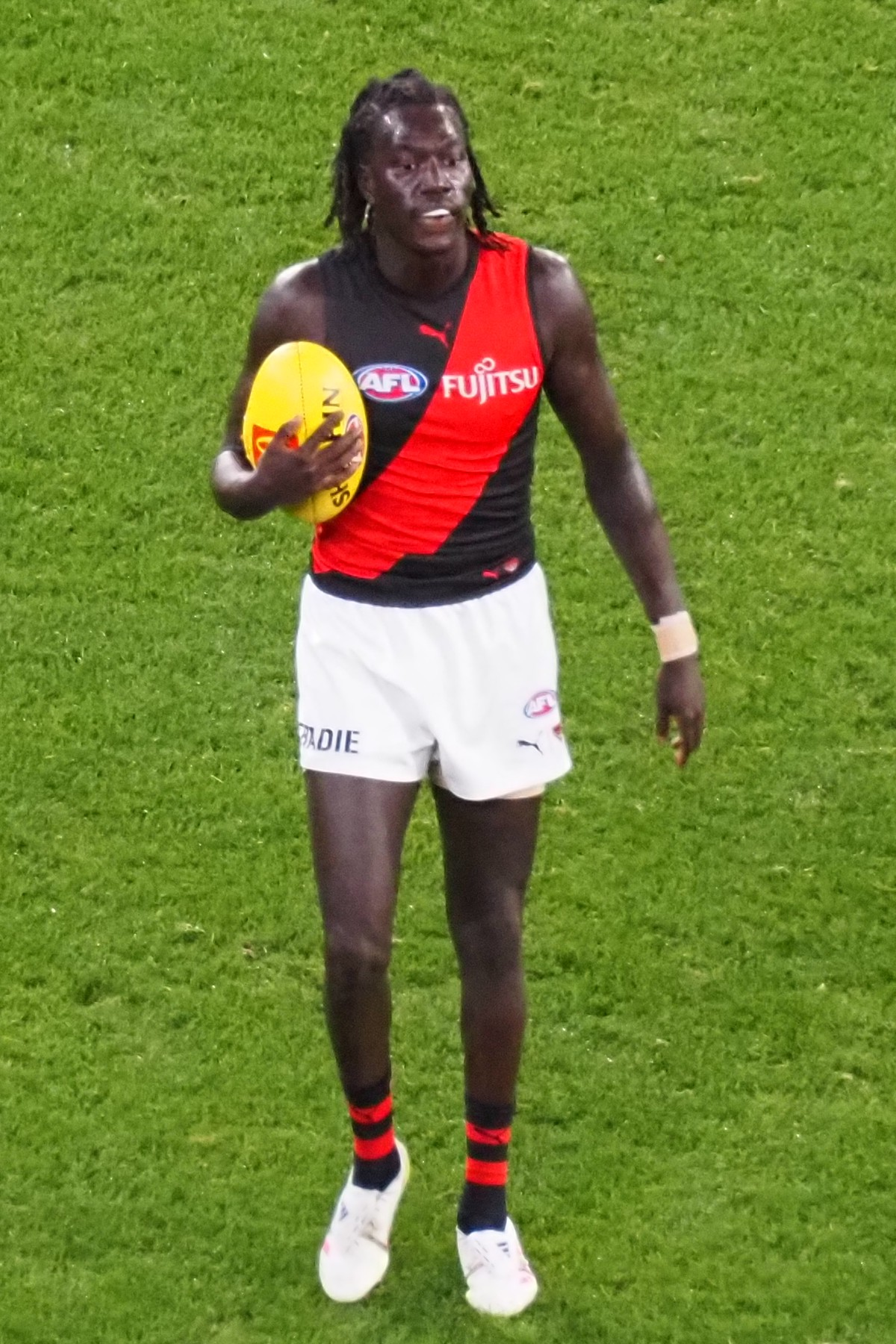
- Lual playing for Essendon in 2025

Personal information
- Full name: Luamon Lual
- Born: 28 March 2005 (age 21); Warrnambool, Victoria
- Original team: Greater Western Victoria Rebels (Talent League)
- Draft: No. 39, 2023 national draft
- Debut: Round 13, 2025, Essendon vs. Carlton, at the Melbourne Cricket Ground
- Height: 181 cm (5 ft 11 in)

Playing career
Years	Club	Games (Goals)
2024–2025	Essendon	12 (4)

Luamon Lual (born 28 March 2005) is a former professional Australian rules footballer who played for the Essendon Football Club in the Australian Football League (AFL). Lual was recruited by Essendon after with the 39th pick in the 2023 AFL draft, and debuted in the 2025 season.

== Early life ==
Lual's parents migrated to Australia in the early 2000s after escaping war-torn South Sudan. His family settled in Warrnambool, Victoria. He attended Emmanuel College and played football for the school.

Lual began playing football at 12 for South Warrnambool Football Club, eventually playing for the Greater Western Victoria Rebels in the U18 Talent League. An excellent 2023 season found him named in the Talent League Team of the Year, as well as being selected for Vic Country in the AFL National Championships.

== AFL career ==
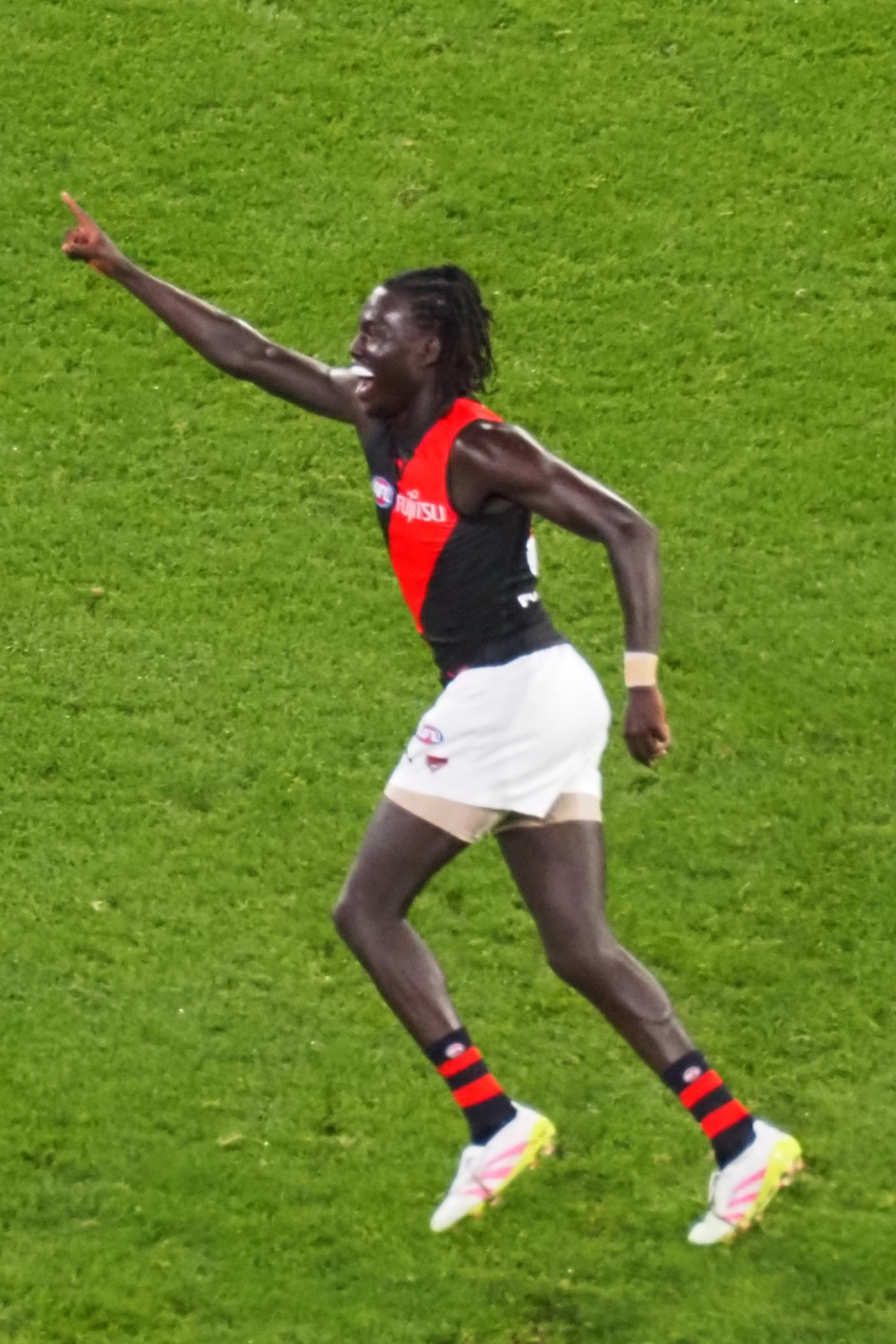
Lual playing for Essendon in 2025

Lual was a member of the Western Bulldogs' Next Generation Academy, however he was drafted by Essendon at Pick 39 of the 2023 AFL draft, one pick before the Bulldogs would have been eligible to match a bid for him.

After not playing a senior game in 2024, he made his debut in Round 13 of the 2025 AFL season, kicking a goal with his first kick in the Bombers' eight-point loss to Carlton. However, Lual was delisted at the end of the season, having played 12 matches.

== Statistics ==
Legend
G	Goals	K	Kicks	D	Disposals	T	Tackles
B	Behinds	H	Handballs	M	Marks

Season	Team	No.	Games	Totals							Averages (per game)							Votes
Season	Team	No.	Games	G	B	K	H	D	M	T	G	B	K	H	D	M	T	Votes
2024	Essendon	34	0	—	—	—	—	—	—	—	—	—	—	—	—	—	—	0
2025	Essendon	34	12	4	0	50	53	103	35	26	0.3	0.0	4.2	4.4	8.6	2.9	2.2	0
Career			12	4	0	50	53	103	35	26	0.3	0.0	4.2	4.4	8.6	2.9	2.2	0
