= Lambert–Pearce Medal =

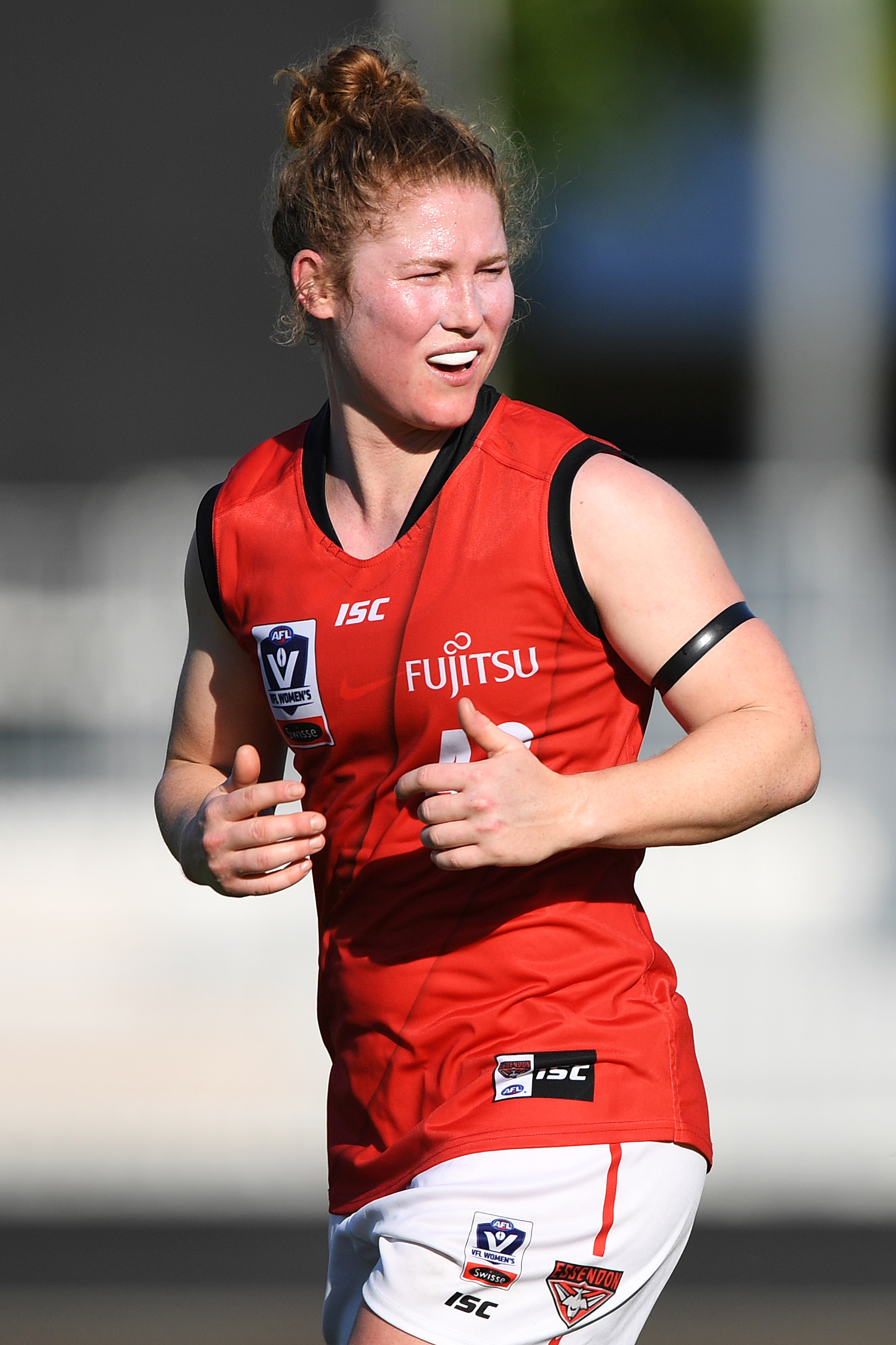
- Georgia Nanscawen, 2021 and 2022 winner
- Awarded for: The best and fairest player in the VFL Women's
- Country: Australia
- Presented by: VFL Women's
- First award: 2016
- Currently held by: Emily Eaves (Williamstown)

Highlights
- Most wins: Georgia Nanscawen (2)
- Website: https://www.afl.com.au/vfl

The Lambert–Pearce Medal is awarded to the best and fairest player in the VFL Women's (VFLW) during the home-and-away season, as determined by votes cast by the officiating field umpires after each game. It is the most prestigious award for individual players in the VFLW.

Essendon's Georgia Nanscawen is the only multiple winner of the award, winning consecutive awards in 2021 and 2022.

== History ==
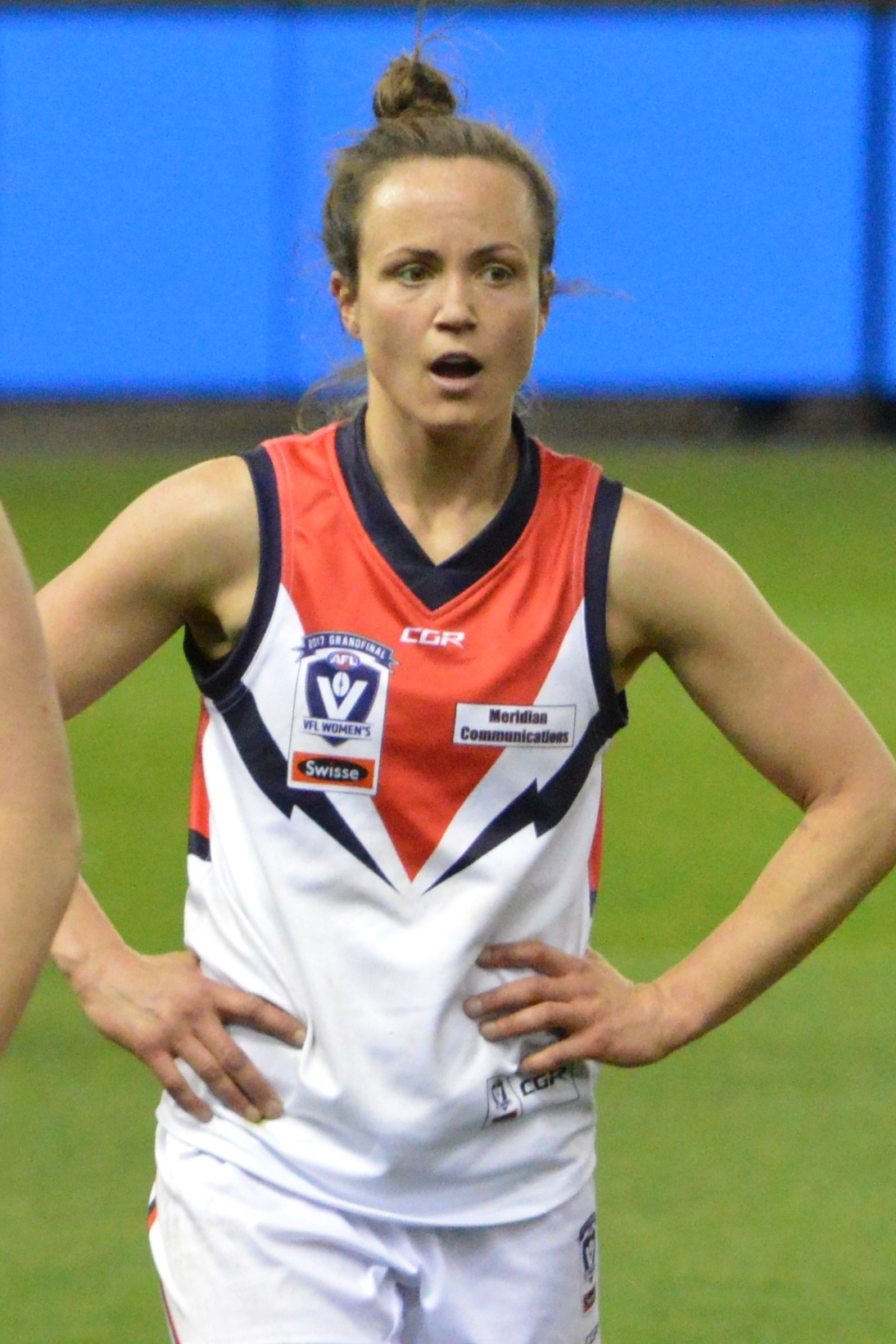
Daisy Pearce (pictured playing for Darebin in the 2017 VFLW Grand Final) won the inaugural VFL Women's best and fairest award.

The VFL Women's best and fairest award was named the Lambert–Pearce Medal in 2018 to honour Victorian Women's Football League (VWFL) founding committee member and former president Helen Lambert (the namesake of the Helen Lambert Medal, the VWFL best and fairest award) and Daisy Pearce, who won the inaugural VFL Women's best and fairest award in 2016 after having previously won six Helen Lambert Medals in the VWFL.

== Criteria ==
=== Voting procedure ===
To determine the best player, the three field umpires (not the goal umpires or boundary umpires) confer after each home-and-away match and award three votes, two votes and one vote to the players they regard as the best, second-best and third-best in the match, respectively. On the awards night, the votes from each match are tallied, and the player or players with the highest number of votes is awarded the trophy (subject to eligibility – see below).

The current voting system, which is the same as that of similar awards such as the Australian Football League (AFL)'s Brownlow Medal or the AFL Women's best and fairest, has been used since the award's inception. If two or more eligible players score the equal highest number of votes, each wins a trophy.

=== Ineligibility ===
The fairest component of the trophy is achieved by making ineligible any player who is suspended by the VFL Tribunal during the home-and-away season. An ineligible player cannot win the award, regardless of the number of votes she has received.

A player remains eligible for the award under the following circumstances:

- she is suspended during the finals or pre-season;
- she serves a suspension in the current season which carried on from, or was earned for an offence committed in, the previous season;
- she receives any sort of club-imposed suspension which is not recognised by the VFL Tribunal;
- she is found guilty by the VFL Tribunal of an offence which attracts only a financial penalty.

Umpires cast their votes for each game independent of eligibility criteria of the players; i.e. umpires can cast votes for players who have already been suspended during that season if they perceive them to be amongst the best on the ground.

== Winners ==
Season	Player	Club	Votes	Ref.
2016	Daisy Pearce	Darebin	33	
2017	Katie Brennan	Darebin	21	
2018	Jess Duffin	Williamstown	23	
2019	Lauren Pearce	Darebin	18	
2020	Not awarded			
2021	Georgia Nanscawen	Essendon	17	
2022	Georgia Nanscawen	Essendon	33	
2023	Jordan Mifsud	Box Hill	14	
2023	Akayla Peterson	Box Hill	14	
2023	Charlotte Simpson	Geelong Cats	14	
2024	Dominique Carbone	Western Bulldogs	17	
2025	Angelica Gogos	Darebin	25	
2026	Emily Eaves	Williamstown	21	

== Records ==
Winners who also won a premiership in the same season

- Daisy Pearce (Darebin, 2016)
- Katie Brennan (Darebin, 2017)
- Georgia Nanscawen (Essendon, 2022)

Winners who also led the league goalkicking in the same season

- Katie Brennan (Darebin, 2017)

Winners who also won the league rising star award in the same season

- Charlotte Simpson (Geelong Cats, 2023)

== See also ==
- J. J. Liston Trophy
- AFL Women's best and fairest
