= 2026 VFL season =

144th season of the Victorian Football League

- Box Hill celebrates with the premiership cup
- Date: 20 March – 20 September 2026
- Teams: 22
- Premiers: Box Hill; 4th premiership
- Runners-up: Geelong reserves 3rd runners-up result
- Minor premiers: Geelong reserves 3rd minor premiership
- J. J. Liston Trophy: Trent Mynott (Frankston – 22 votes); George Stevens (Geelong – 22 votes)
- Frosty Miller Medallist: Corey Ellison (Frankston – 52 goals)

Attendance
- Matches played: 209
- Highest (H&A): 14,122 (Round 5, Tasmania v Carlton)
- Highest (finals): 12,941 (Grand Final, Geelong v Box Hill)

The 2026 VFL season was the 144th season of the Victorian Football League (VFL), a second-tier Australian rules football competition played in the states of Victoria, New South Wales, Queensland and Tasmania. The season commenced on 20 March and concluded on 20 September.

Box Hill won the premiership for the fourth time, defeating Geelong by 23 points in the 2026 VFL Grand Final. It was the first grand final since 2019 to feature two Victorian teams.

== Background ==
=== Broadcast rights ===
The Seven Network, which had broadcast VFL matches since 2015, did not renew its deal, stating that the practice was no longer commercially viable. During the 2025 season, one match per round had been shown in Victoria on its secondary channel, 7mate. On 12 February 2026, Crikey reported that the ABC had secured the VFL television and radio rights for the 2026 season. The full broadcast deal was announced on 12 March 2026.

The ABC broadcast one match per round, generally commencing at 12:05pm on Saturdays, which was available on ABC Television in Victoria, ABC iview nationally, and simulcast on ABC Radio and ABC Listen.

Kayo Sports, which previously broadcast VFL matches in 2021, streamed at least one home-and-away match per round (which was also shown on Fox Footy). The Seven Network broadcast all ten of the Tasmania Football Club's home matches on Seven Tasmania and 7plus nationally. The Sports Entertainment Network (SEN) broadcast all of Tasmania's home-and-away matches on radio.

The preliminary finals and grand final were broadcast by the ABC. All matches continued to be broadcast online through the AFL's website and app.

== League membership ==
In 2026, 22 teams competed in the VFL, the equal-most (with 2021) to contest a VFA/VFL premiership in a single division. It was the first time that clubs from four different states were represented in the same season.

=== Preston ===
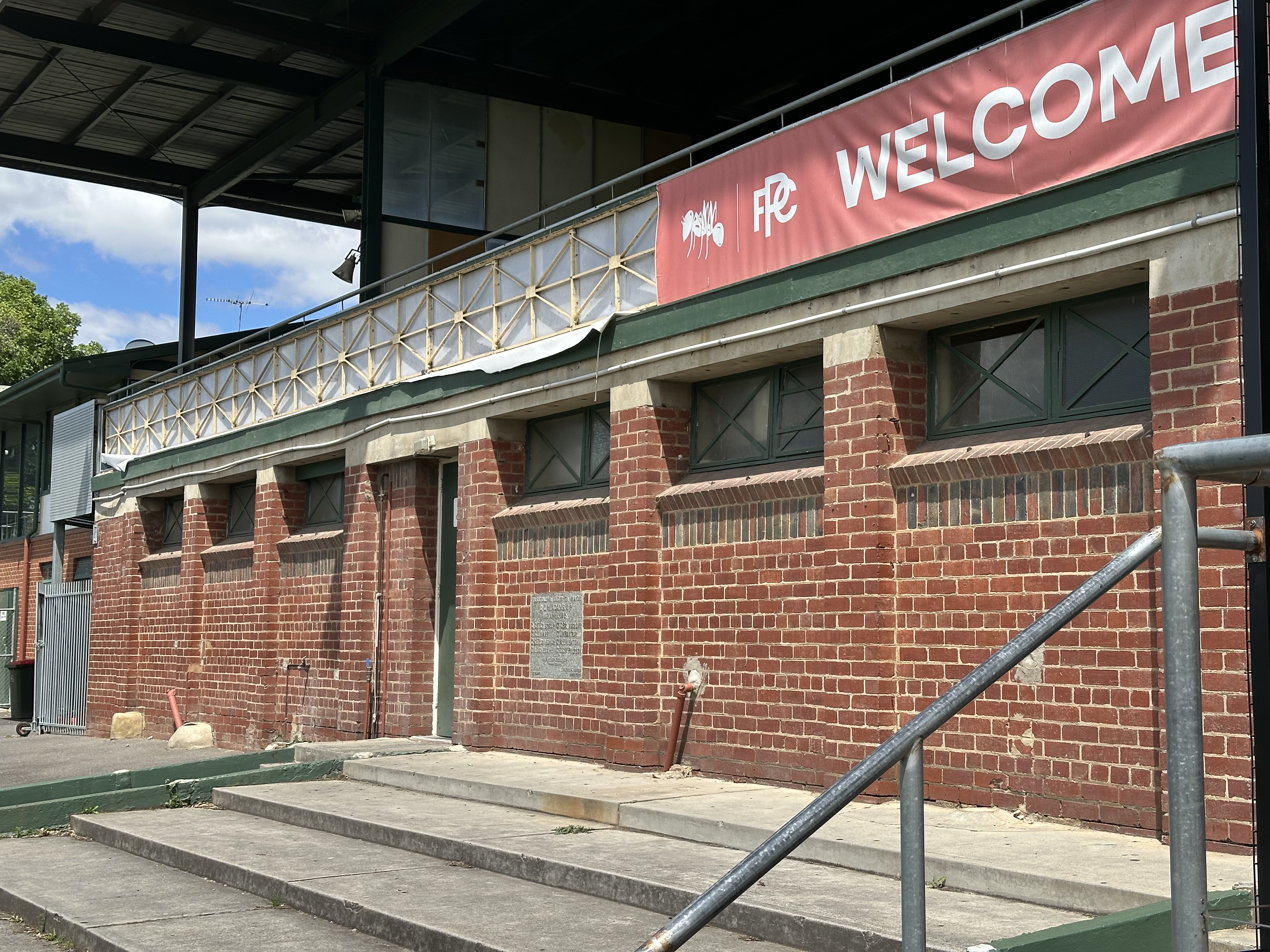
Torn-down advertising signage next to a Preston Football Club banner at Preston City Oval in November 2025

The Northern Bullants faced several challenges throughout the 2025 season. A new president and board took over in May 2025, reverting the club to its traditional "Preston Football Club" name on 20 August 2025, immediately after the conclusion of the home-and-away season. The club had last competed as Preston in 1999 (when it was nicknamed the "Knights").

At the same time, it was reported that the club could be in danger of folding because of debt, with the club asking the Australian Football League (AFL) to financially assist. On 6 October 2025, after years of uncompetitive performances, having struggled to pay its players and staff in 2025, and with questions over its long-term viability without the annual subsidies that clubs had received from the league prior to the pandemic-interrupted 2020 season, the VFL revoked the club's licence.

It was the not the first time Preston's history that it had faced similar circumstances – in 1912 it amalgamated with Northcote, in 1997 its licence was withdrawn but was restored after one month, and in 2020 it almost folded after Carlton ended their affiliation.

Initially, Preston club officials expressed optimism about regaining a VFL licence in 2027 or 2028. However, faced with no viable path to readmission, the club entered voluntary liquidation after a meeting of members on 15 December 2025.

=== St Kilda ===
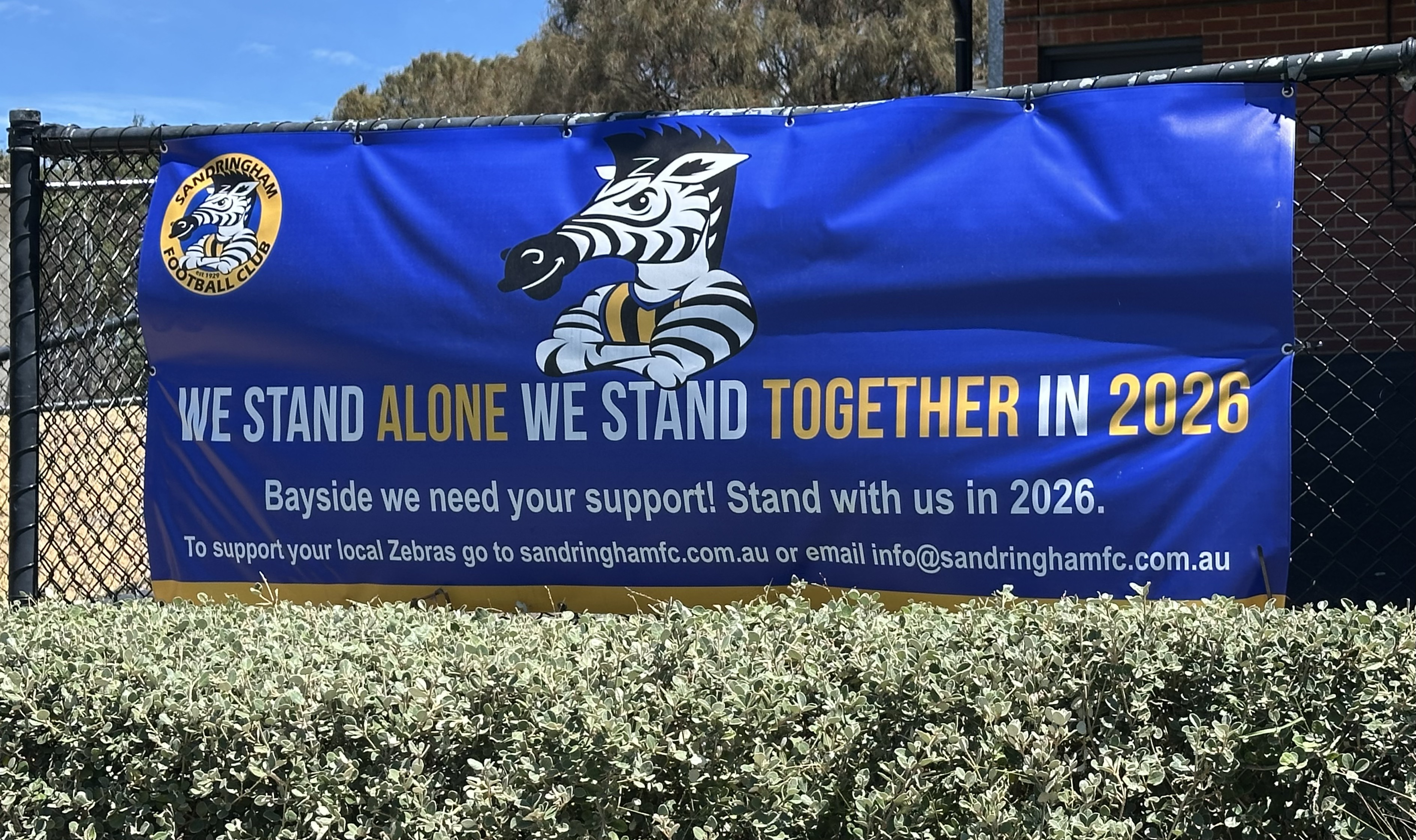
Promotional signage inside Trevor Barker Beach Oval for Sandringham's return as a standalone team

St Kilda competed in the VFL with its own reserves team during the 2000 season, before entering into an affiliation with Springvale (later renamed Casey) in 2001. The agreement ended after the 2008 season and St Kilda affiliated with Sandringham in 2009.

In April 2025, Sandringham rejected a proposal from St Kilda to be renamed to the "Sandringham Saints" and move all home matches from Trevor Barker Beach Oval to Moorabbin Oval. The proposal also would have resulted in Sandringham permanently using St Kilda's colours of red, black and white (which it had already worn as an away jumper beginning in 2019).

On 30 June 2025, St Kilda announced it would end its affiliation with Sandringham following the 2025 season. The AFL granted a VFL licence to St Kilda the same day, while Sandringham continued in the competition as a standalone team.

Sandringham defeated Werribee in round 2 after trailing by 34 points at half-time, which was its first victory as a standalone team since the 1999 VFL semi-final.

=== Tasmania ===
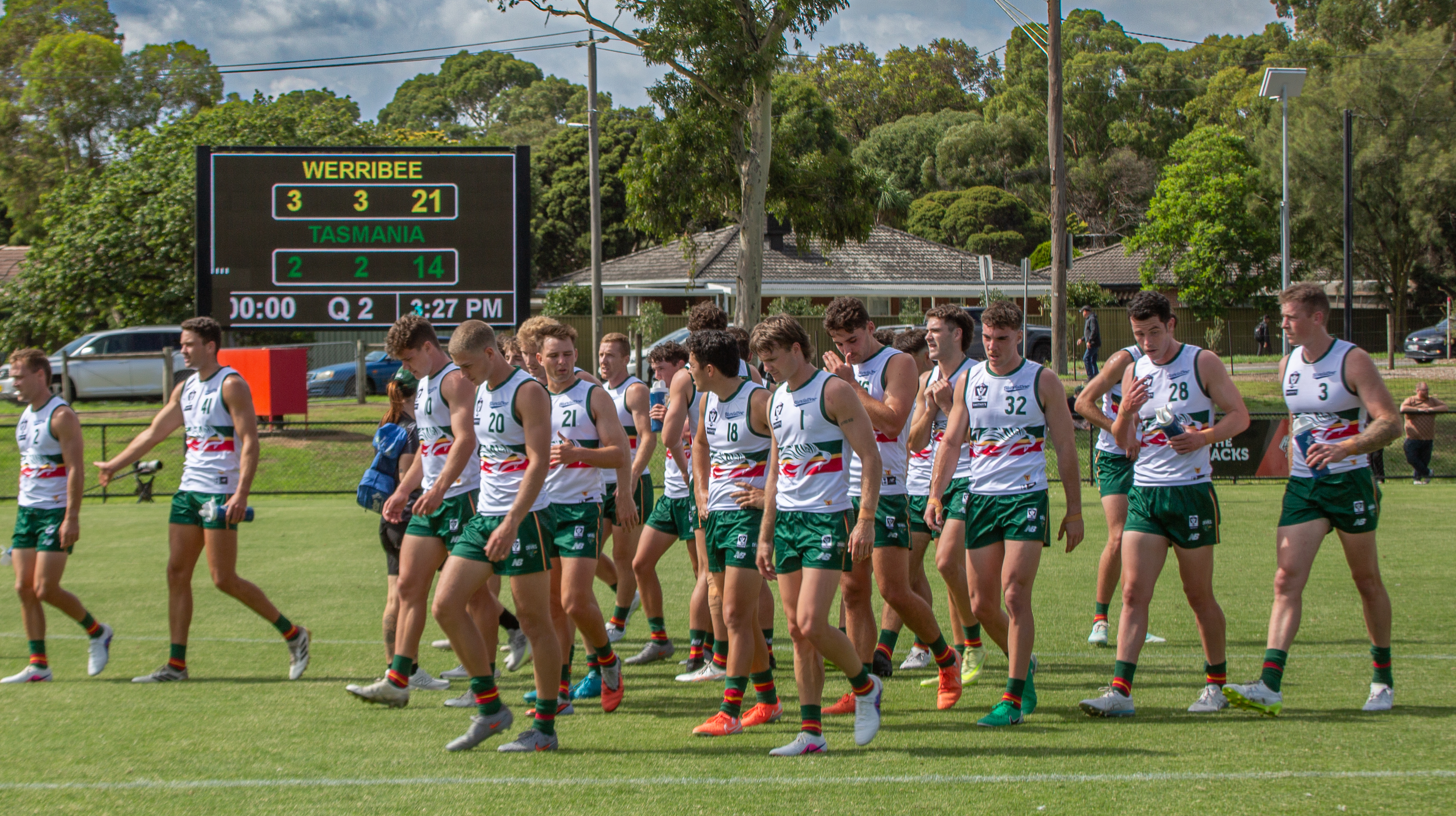
Tasmania during its first practice match against Werribee on 7 March 2026

On 5 September 2025, the Tasmania Football Club was granted a licence to compete in the VFL from 2026, ahead of its planned entry into the AFL from the 2028 season. Jeromey Webberley was appointed as the club's inaugural VFL coach, while former Essendon player Jye Menzie became the club's first player when he was signed on 30 September 2025.

Tasmania played its first official practice match against Werribee at RMIT Oval on 7 March 2026, losing 14.8 (92) to 10.12 (72). It played its first home-and-away season match against Coburg at North Hobart Oval in round 1, winning 14.12 (96) to 11.13 (79).

It was the first time a club from Tasmania had competed in the VFL since the original Tasmania Football Club, which competed from 2001 until the end of 2008.

== Clubs ==
=== Venues and affiliations ===
Club	State	Home venue(s)	Capacity	AFL affiliation
Box Hill	VIC	Box Hill City Oval	6,000	Hawthorn
Box Hill	VIC	Kennedy Community Centre	3,000	Hawthorn
Brisbane	QLD	Brighton Homes Arena	8,000	Brisbane
Carlton	VIC	Ikon Park	13,000	Carlton
Casey	VIC	Casey Fields	9,000	Melbourne
Coburg	VIC	Barry Plant Park	15,000	—N/a
Collingwood	VIC	Victoria Park	10,000	Collingwood
Collingwood	VIC	KGM Centre	3,500	Collingwood
Collingwood	VIC	Tony Sheehan Oval	2,500	Collingwood
Essendon	VIC	NEC Hangar	3,500	Essendon
Essendon	VIC	Windy Hill	10,000	Essendon
Footscray	VIC	Mission Whitten Oval	10,000	Western Bulldogs
Footscray	VIC	Marvel Stadium	53,343	Western Bulldogs
Frankston	VIC	Kinetic Stadium	5,000	—N/a
Geelong	VIC	GMHBA Stadium	40,000	Geelong
Gold Coast	QLD	People First Stadium	25,000	Gold Coast
Greater Western Sydney	NSW	Tom Wills Oval	1,000	Greater Western Sydney
Greater Western Sydney	NSW	ENGIE Stadium	23,500	Greater Western Sydney
Greater Western Sydney	NSW	Narrandera Sportsground	14,000	Greater Western Sydney
North Melbourne	VIC	Arden Street Oval	4,000	North Melbourne
Port Melbourne	VIC	ETU Stadium	6,000	—N/a
Richmond	VIC	Holm Park	7,000	Richmond
Richmond	VIC	Kinetic Stadium	5,000	Richmond
Richmond	VIC	ETU Stadium	6,000	Richmond
Sandringham	VIC	WS Trevor Barker Beach Oval	6,000	—N/a
Southport	QLD	Fankhauser Reserve	8,000	—N/a
St Kilda	VIC	RSEA Park	8,000	St Kilda
Sydney	NSW	Tramway Oval	1,000	Sydney
Sydney	NSW	Blacktown ISP Oval	10,000	Sydney
Sydney	NSW	Sydney Cricket Ground	48,000	Sydney
Tasmania	TAS	Ninja Stadium	20,000	—N/a
Tasmania	TAS	North Hobart Oval	11,135	—N/a
Tasmania	TAS	UTAS Stadium	17,000	—N/a
Tasmania	TAS	Dial Park	3,000	—N/a
Werribee	VIC	Avalon Airport Oval	8,000	—N/a
Williamstown	VIC	DSV Stadium	6,000	—N/a

=== Coach appointments ===
New coach	Club	Date of appointment	Previous coach	Ref
Daniel Ward	Sandringham	4 September 2025	Brendon Goddard	
Jeromey Webberley	Tasmania	8 September 2025	N/A	
Adam Marcon	North Melbourne	15 September 2025	Tom Lynch	
Jack Madgen	Richmond	24 September 2025	Jake Batchelor	
Nick Malceski	Sydney	7 October 2025	Jarrad McVeigh	
Rhett McLennan	Casey	10 October 2025	Taylor Whitford	
David Mirra	Box Hill	12 October 2025	Zane Littlejohn	
Damian Truslove	Carlton	27 October 2025	Luke Power	
Alex Johnson	Footscray	27 October 2025	Stewart Edge	
Matthew Lokan	Collingwood	31 October 2025	Andy Otten	
Brendon Goddard	St Kilda	16 November 2025	N/A	
Dan Lowther	Werribee	10 December 2025	James Allan	
Robbie Chancellor	Greater Western Sydney	4 March 2026	Wayne Cripps	
Scott Borlace	Brisbane	TBD	Ben Hudson	

=== Club leadership ===
Club	Coach	Leadership group			Ref
Club	Coach	Captain(s)	Vice-captain(s)	Other leader(s)	Ref
Box Hill	David Mirra	Stu Horner	Trent Bianco, Kye Declase	Corey Preston, Blake Simondson	
Brisbane	Scott Borlace				
Carlton	Damian Truslove	AFL-listed player rotation		Darcy Tucker, Ethan Phillips, Jack Sammartino, Logan Prout, Will Cookson, Cooper Vickery	
Casey	Rhett McLennan				
Coburg	Jamie Cassidy-McNamara	Jesse Corigliano			
Collingwood	Matthew Lokan	Brady Grey, Ben De Bolfo		Will Phillips, Josh Browne, Max Mahoney	
Essendon	Cameron Joyce	Xavier O'Neill	Jackson Hately		
Footscray	Alex Johnson	Dan Orgill	Billy Crofts, Cooper Craig-Peters		
Frankston	Jackson Kornberg	Trent Mynott	Joe Lloyd, George Grey, Taine Barlow	Noah Gown, Darby Hipwell, Corey Ellison, ~~Tom Blamires~~ (Note: Tom Blamires was drafted to North Melbourne in the AFL pre-season supplemental selection period prior to the start of the VFL season.)	
Geelong	Mark Corrigan	Dan Capiron	~~Marcus Herbert~~ (Note: Marcus Herbert was drafted by West Coast in the 2026 AFL mid-season rookie draft.)		
Gold Coast	Tate Kaesler	Alex Sexton			
Greater Western Sydney	Robbie Chancellor	Ryan Hebron			
North Melbourne	Adam Marcon				
Port Melbourne	Brendan McCartney	Tom Hird	Kaine Baldwin	Tom Highmore, Josh Green, Tom Graham	
Richmond	Jack Madgen				
Sandringham	Daniel Ward	Blake Watson	Ben Stephenson, Mitch Ryan, Ethan Williams	Josh Hutchings, Kynan Brown, Brodie Findlay, Billy Johnson	
Southport	Matthew Primus	Brayden Crossley, Jacob Dawson	Zac Foot	Jesse Joyce, Michael Manteit, Max Spencer	
St Kilda	Brendon Goddard	Billy McGee Galimberti	Ned Maginness, Billy Richardson	Jett Hartman, Bailey McKenzie	
Sydney	Nick Malceski				
Tasmania	Jeromey Webberley	Robbie Fox	Jye Menzie	Brad-Cox Goodyer, Hugh Dixon, Caleb Mitchell	
Werribee	Dan Lowther	Jesse Clark	Dom Brew (vc), Louis Pinnuck (dvc)	Jay Dahlhaus, Charlie Lazzaro	
Williamstown	Justin Plapp	Finn O'Dwyer	Toby Triffett, Jack Toner	Luke Parks	

== Pre-season ==
=== Practice matches ===
VFL practice matches began on 13 February 2026.

	2026 VFL practice matches
Friday, 13 February (6:30pm)	Coburg 6.12 (48)	def. by	Richmond 7.10 (52)	La Trobe Sports Park	Report
Wednesday, 18 February (7:05pm)	Carlton 7.14 (56)	def.	Coburg 7.8 (50)	Ikon Park	Report
Thursday, 19 February (5:00pm)	Footscray 13.9 (87)	def.	Sandringham 8.11 (59)	Mission Whitten Oval	Report
Friday, 20 February (1:05pm)	Essendon 18.13 (121)	def.	Richmond 8.7 (55)	NEC Hangar	Report
Friday, 20 February (2:30pm)	Casey 12.5 (77)	def. by	North Melbourne 11.12 (78)	Casey Fields	Scores
Friday, 20 February (5:30pm)	St Kilda 6.7 (43)	def. by	Port Melbourne 19.10 (124)	RSEA Park	Scores
Saturday, 21 February (12:30pm)	Williamstown 17.11 (113)	def.	Frankston 6.5 (41)	La Trobe Sports Park	Scores
Wednesday, 25 February (2:00pm)	Carlton 13.4 (82)	def.	Geelong 13.3 (81)	Ikon Park	Report
Thursday, 26 February (10:30am)	Brisbane 12.6 (78)	def.	Gold Coast 11.8 (74)	Brighton Homes Arena	Scores
Thursday, 26 February (abandoned)	Sydney	v	Greater Western Sydney	Henson Park
Friday, 27 February (4:10pm)	Footscray 10.11 (71)	def. by	Box Hill 11.7 (73)	Mission Whitten Oval	Report
Friday, 27 February (5:30pm)	North Melbourne 7.9 (51)	def. by	Coburg 9.20 (74)	Arden Street Oval	Scores
Saturday, 28 February (10:00am)	Coburg 12.12 (84)	def.	Sandringham 6.8 (44)	Highgate Recreation Reserve	Report
Saturday, 28 February (11:00am)	Casey 5.4 (34)	def. by	Richmond 12.12 (84)	Casey Fields	Report
Saturday, 28 February (12:45pm)	Werribee 17.10 (112)	def.	Frankston 6.9 (45)	Highgate Recreation Reserve	Scores
Saturday, 28 February (3:30pm)	Williamstown 14.6 (90)	def.	Port Melbourne 10.7 (67)	Highgate Recreation Reserve	Scores
Sunday, 1 March (10:00am)	North Melbourne 11.8 (74)	def. by	Collingwood 15.14 (104)	Arden Street Oval	Report
Sunday, 1 March (11:00am)	Essendon 10.6 (66)	def. by	St Kilda 16.11 (107)	NEC Hangar	Scores
Friday, 6 March (3:00pm)	Gold Coast 13.8 (86)	def.	Southport 7.3 (45)	Austworld Centre Oval	Scores
Friday, 6 March (5:00pm)	Carlton 6.22 (58)	def. by	Footscray 12.7 (79)	Ikon Park	Scores
Friday, 6 March (5:00pm)	Sydney 15.6 (106)	def.	North Shore 1.3 (9)	Tramway Oval	Scores
Saturday, 7 March (10:00am)	Brisbane 27.14 (176)	def.	Aspley 3.3 (21)	Graham Road Oval	Scores
Saturday, 7 March (10:30am)	St Kilda 11.10 (76)	def. by	Williamstown 11.14 (80)	RSEA Park	Scores
Saturday, 7 March (11:00am)	Casey 13.12 (90)	def. by	Box Hill 14.14 (98)	Casey Fields	Report
Saturday, 7 March (12:00pm)	Frankston 13.9 (87)	def. by	Sandringham 13.11 (89)	Belvedere Reserve	Scores
Saturday, 7 March (12:00pm)	North Melbourne 13.9 (87)	def. by	Geelong 14.11 (95)	Arden Street Oval	Scores
Saturday, 7 March (3:00pm)	Werribee 14.8 (92)	def.	Tasmania 10.12 (72)	RMIT Oval	Scores
Saturday, 7 March (3:00pm)	Glenelg 9.10 (64)	def. by	Coburg 11.9 (75)	West Gambier Football Oval	Scores
Thursday, 12 March (1:00pm)	Carlton 10.17 (77)	def.	Richmond 10.10 (70)	Ikon Park	Scores
Friday, 13 March (4:30pm)	Box Hill 12.13 (85)	def.	Port Melbourne 12.10 (82)	Kennedy Community Centre	Scores
Saturday, 14 March (10:00am)	Footscray 17.14 (116)	def.	Werribee 10.10 (70)	Mission Whitten Oval	Scores
Saturday, 14 March (cancelled)	Brisbane	v	Southport	Brighton Homes Arena
Saturday, 14 March (9:30am)	Greater Western Sydney 14.4 (88)	def. by	Sydney 14.14 (98)	Tom Wills Oval
Saturday, 14 March (11:00am)	Geelong 22.4 (138)	def.	Collingwood 13.9 (87)	Deakin University Elite Sports Precinct	Scores
Saturday, 14 March (2:00pm)	North Melbourne 14.11 (95)	def.	Essendon 11.15 (81)	Arden Street Oval	Report
Sunday, 15 March (10:00am)	St Kilda 10.6 (66)	def. by	Casey 24.22 (166)	RSEA Park	Report
Sunday, 15 March (1:30pm)	Gold Coast 17.9 (111)	def.	Palm Beach Currumbin 5.3 (33)	People First Stadium	Report
Sydney v Greater Western Sydney was abandoned without any play having occurred because of poor weather at Henson Park.; Southport v Brisbane was cancelled because Brisbane had only five AFL-listed players available.

== Home-and-away season ==
=== Round 1 ===
	Round 1
Friday, 20 March (12:35pm)	Box Hill 16.11 (107)	def.	Sydney 10.11 (71)	Kennedy Community Centre	Report; Stats
Friday, 20 March (7:05pm)	Geelong 24.19 (163)	def.	Essendon 12.6 (78)	GMHBA Stadium	Report; Stats
Friday, 20 March (7:35pm)	Frankston 14.11 (95)	def. by	Williamstown 14.13 (97)	Kinetic Stadium	Report; Stats
Saturday, 21 March (10:00am)	Richmond 14.16 (100)	def.	Southport 7.18 (60)	Kinetic Stadium	Report; Stats
Satuday, 21 March (11:05am)	Greater Western Sydney 17.16 (118)	def.	St Kilda 10.14 (74)	Tom Wills Oval	Report; Stats
Saturday, 21 March (12:05pm)	Tasmania 14.12 (96)	def.	Coburg 11.13 (79)	North Hobart Oval (crowd: 10,634)	Report; Stats
Saturday, 21 March (12:05pm)	Footscray 19.21 (135)	def.	Casey 14.8 (92)	Mission Whitten Oval	Report; Stats
Sunday, 22 March (11:00am)	Gold Coast 8.10 (58)	def. by	Werribee 9.19 (73)	People First Stadium	Report; Stats
Sunday, 22 March (2:05pm)	Sandringham 12.15 (87)	def. by	Port Melbourne 14.17 (101)	Trevor Barker Beach Oval (crowd: 2,200)	Report; Stats
	Bye; Brisbane, Carlton, Collingwood, North Melbourne
Four matches were impacted by time changes to accommodate broadcasts: Richmond v Southport (12:05pm to 10:00am), Tasmania v Coburg (1:05pm to 12:05pm), Footscray v Casey (2:05pm to 12:05pm), and Gold Coast v Werribee (11:05am to 11:00am).; Because of nearby lightning, the Greater Western Sydney v St Kilda match was halted for 30 minutes during the third quarter.

=== Round 2 ===
	Round 2
Friday, 27 March (3:00pm)	Collingwood 11.13 (79)	def. by	Greater Western Sydney 14.11 (95)	KGM Centre	Report; Stats
Friday, 27 March (7:05pm)	Geelong 19.9 (123)	def.	Box Hill 11.10 (76)	GMHBA Stadium	Report; Stats
Friday, 27 March (7:35pm)	Frankston 10.13 (73)	def.	St Kilda 9.11 (65)	Kinetic Stadium	Report; Stats
Saturday, 28 March (11:05am)	Richmond 9.10 (64)	def. by	Coburg 12.15 (87)	Holm Park	Report; Stats
Saturday, 28 March (12:05pm)	Brisbane 15.11 (101)	def. by	Southport 19.8 (122)	Brighton Homes Arena	Report; Stats
Saturday, 28 March (12:05pm)	Sandringham 10.13 (73)	def.	Werribee 8.9 (57)	Trevor Barker Beach Oval	Report; Stats
Saturday, 28 March (12:05pm)	Tasmania 15.11 (101)	def.	Port Melbourne 14.9 (93)	UTAS Stadium (crowd: 5,013)	Report; Stats
Saturday, 28 March (12:35pm)	Essendon 15.8 (98)	def.	North Melbourne 12.7 (79)	NEC Hangar	Report; Stats
Sunday, 29 March (11:05am)	Carlton 12.7 (79)	def. by	Williamstown 12.12 (84)	Ikon Park	Report; Stats
	Bye; Casey, Footscray, Gold Coast, Sydney
Collingwood v Greater Western Sydney was moved from Victoria Park to KGM Centre.; Tasmania v Port Melbourne, which was scheduled to be played on 29 March, was moved to 28 March with the same starting time of 12:05pm because no flights were scheduled to leave Launceston on the evening of 29 March.

=== Round 3 ===
	Round 3
Friday, 3 April (11:05am)	Brisbane 13.13 (91)	def. by	Sandringham 15.8 (98)	Brighton Homes Arena	Report
Friday, 3 April (11:30am)	North Melbourne 17.8 (110)	def.	Carlton 14.15 (99)	Arden Street Oval	Report
Friday, 3 April (1:05pm)	Coburg 10.14 (74)	def. by	Collingwood 17.17 (119)	Barry Plant Park	Report
Friday, 3 April (2:05pm)	Frankston 9.13 (67)	def. by	Tasmania 21.19 (145)	Kinetic Stadium (crowd: 4,613)	Report
Saturday, 4 April (12:05pm)	Southport 22.13 (145)	def.	Gold Coast 10.9 (69)	Fankhauser Reserve	Report
Saturday, 4 April (12:05pm)	Werribee 6.10 (46)	def. by	Geelong 12.18 (90)	Avalon Airport Oval	Report
Saturday, 4 April (1:00pm)	Port Melbourne 7.15 (57)	def. by	Sydney 12.6 (78)	ETU Stadium (crowd: 2,500)	Report
Sunday, 5 April (11:05am)	Casey 17.8 (110)	def.	Box Hill 16.10 (106)	Casey Fields	Report
Sunday, 5 April (1:05pm)	St Kilda 11.9 (75)	def. by	Richmond 16.12 (108)	RSEA Park	Report
Sunday, 5 April (3:20pm)	Footscray 18.10 (118)	def.	Essendon 10.11 (71)	Marvel Stadium	Report
	Bye; Greater Western Sydney, Williamstown
Footscray v Essendon, which was scheduled to be played at Mission Whitten Oval at 3:05pm, was moved to Marvel Stadium as a curtain-raiser to the round 4 AFL match between the same clubs.

=== Round 4 ===
	Round 4
Friday, 17 April (3:00pm)	Geelong 7.9 (51)	def. by	Footscray 12.12 (84)	GMHBA Stadium	Report
Friday, 17 April (3:35pm)	Sydney 15.6 (96)	def.	Greater Western Sydney 10.14 (74)	Sydney Cricket Ground	Report
Friday, 17 April (7:05pm)	Carlton 11.19 (85)	def.	Collingwood 7.12 (54)	Ikon Park	Report
Saturday, 18 April (9:30am)	Gold Coast 16.21 (117)	def.	Essendon 19.9 (123)	People First Stadium	Report
Saturday, 18 April (12:05pm)	Williamstown 19.13 (127)	def.	Southport 10.14 (74)	DSV Stadium (crowd: 1,000)	Report
Saturday, 18 April (12:05pm)	Coburg 12.13 (85)	def. by	St Kilda 17.12 (114)	Barry Plant Park	Report
Saturday, 18 April (2:05pm)	Sandringham 10.9 (69)	def. by	North Melbourne 22.17 (149)	Trevor Barker Beach Oval	Report
Saturday, 18 April (2:05pm)	Port Melbourne 11.4 (70)	def. by	Box Hill 21.17 (143)	ETU Stadium	Report
Saturday, 18 April (2:05pm)	Werribee 15.12 (102)	def.	Frankston 11.14 (80)	Avalon Airport Oval	Report
Sunday, 19 April (11:05am)	Casey 13.9 (87)	def. by	Brisbane 20.5 (125)	Casey Fields	Report
	Bye; Richmond, Tasmania

=== Round 5 ===
	Round 5
Friday, 24 April (11:05am)	Footscray 12.9 (81)	def. by	Sydney 22.8 (140)	Mission Whitten Oval	Report
Friday, 24 April (2:05pm)	Collingwood 17.12 (114)	def.	Essendon 15.13 (103)	KGM Centre	Report
Friday, 24 April (7:35pm)	Frankston 16.8 (104)	def.	Coburg 10.11 (71)	Kinetic Stadium	Report
Saturday, 25 April (1:05pm)	Casey 11.14 (80)	def.	Richmond 7.11 (53)	Casey Fields	Report
Saturday, 25 April (7:05pm)	Williamstown 11.6 (72)	def. by	Werribee 14.13 (97)	DSV Stadium (crowd: 2,000)	Report
Saturday, 25 April (7:05pm)	Tasmania 9.14 (68)	def. by	Carlton 14.9 (93)	Ninja Stadium (crowd: 14,122)	Report
Sunday, 26 April (9:30am)	Greater Western Sydney 20.22 (142)	def.	North Melbourne 12.7 (79)	Tom Wills Oval	Report
Sunday, 26 April (11:05am)	Brisbane 6.8 (44)	def. by	Port Melbourne 13.11 (89)	Brighton Homes Arena	Report
Sunday, 26 April (2:05pm)	Sandringham 12.11 (83)	def. by	Box Hill 15.13 (103)	Trevor Barker Beach Oval	Report
Sunday, 26 April (2:05pm)	St Kilda 8.13 (61)	def. by	Gold Coast 14.12 (96)	RSEA Park	Report
	Bye; Southport, Geelong
Collingwood v Essendon was moved from Victoria Park to KGM Centre.

=== Round 6 ===
	Round 6
Friday, 1 May (7:05pm)	Box Hill 16.13 (109)	def.	Collingwood 15.10 (100)	Kennedy Community Centre	Report
Friday, 1 May (7:35pm)	Richmond 9.8 (62)	def. by	Frankston 11.8 (74)	Kinetic Stadium	Report
Saturday, 2 May (10:35am)	Southport 12.8 (80)	def.	Footscray 10.10 (70)	Fankhauser Reserve	Report
Saturday, 2 May (12:05pm)	Carlton 14.14 (98)	def.	St Kilda 13.15 (93)	Ikon Park	Report
Saturday, 2 May (12:30pm)	Geelong 11.20 (86)	def.	North Melbourne 11.7 (73)	GMHBA Stadium	Report
Saturday, 2 May (1:05pm)	Coburg 17.13 (115)	def.	Brisbane 6.14 (50)	Barry Plant Park	Report
Saturday, 2 May (2:05pm)	Essendon 11.9 (75)	def. by	Williamstown 12.16 (88)	Windy Hill
Sunday, 3 May (12:05pm)	Tasmania 19.12 (126)	def.	Sandringham 15.10 (100)	UTAS Stadium (crowd: 2,489)	Report
Sunday, 3 May (12:15pm)	Sydney 14.10 (94)	def.	Casey 11.11 (77)	Tramway Oval	Report
Sunday, 3 May (2:05pm)	Port Melbourne 13.12 (90)	def.	Werribee 9.10 (64)	ETU Stadium	Report
Sunday, 3 May (2:35pm)	Gold Coast 11.12 (78)	def. by	Greater Western Sydney 21.8 (134)	People First Stadium	Report
Box Hill v Collingwood, which was scheduled to be played at Box Hill City Oval on 2 May, was moved to Kennedy Community Centre.; This was Box Hill's 500th senior match since the beginning of its reserves affiliation with Hawthorn in 2000.

=== Round 7 ===
	Round 7
Saturday, 9 May (10:00am)	Casey 3.17 (35)	def. by	Carlton 24.13 (157)	Casey Fields	Report
Saturday, 9 May (10:35am)	Southport 9.15 (69)	def. by	Coburg 17.10 (112)	Fankhauser Reserve	Report
Saturday, 9 May (3:05pm)	Collingwood 8.7 (55)	def. by	Geelong 17.14 (116)	Victoria Park	Report
Saturday, 9 May (4:05pm)	Werribee 14.13 (97)	drew with	Tasmania 14.13 (97)	Avalon Airport Oval	Report
Saturday, 9 May (4:35pm)	North Melbourne 10.15 (75)	def.	Sydney 9.9 (63)	Arden Street Oval	Report
Saturday, 9 May (6:05pm)	Williamstown 16.11 (107)	def.	Richmond 10.10 (70)	DSV Stadium	Report
Sunday, 10 May (11:05am)	Greater Western Sydney 8.15 (63)	def. by	Essendon 17.12 (114)	Tom Wills Oval	Report
Sunday, 10 May (2:05pm)	Sandringham 9.16 (70)	def. by	St Kilda 13.7 (85)	Trevor Barker Beach Oval	Report
	Bye; Box Hill, Brisbane, Footscray, Frankston, Gold Coast, Port Melbourne

=== Round 8 ===
	Round 8
Friday, 15 May (12:05pm)	Brisbane 7.7 (49)	def. by	Geelong 15.25 (115)	Brighton Homes Arena	Report
Friday, 15 May (2:05pm)	Sydney 19.12 (126)	def.	Collingwood 10.14 (74)	Tramway Oval	Report
Saturday, 16 May (10:05am)	Box Hill 12.11 (83)	def.	Richmond 12.10 (82)	Box Hill City Oval	Report
Saturday, 16 May (11:05am)	Gold Coast 12.11 (83)	def. by	Frankston 19.8 (122)	People First Stadium	Report
Saturday, 16 May (11:05am)	Tasmania 11.11 (77)	def. by	Southport 20.10 (130)	North Hobart Oval (crowd: 6,300)	Report
Saturday, 16 May (12:05pm)	Carlton 16.21 (117)	def.	Footscray 15.7 (97)	Ikon Park	Report
Saturday, 16 May (2:05pm)	St Kilda 15.15 (105)	def.	Casey 8.9 (57)	RSEA Park	Report
Saturday, 16 May (2:05pm)	Port Melbourne 15.13 (103)	def.	North Melbourne 13.12 (90)	ETU Stadium	Report
Sunday, 17 May (1:05pm)	Sandringham 12.12 (84)	def. by	Greater Western Sydney 12.15 (87)	Trevor Barker Beach Oval	Report
	Bye; Coburg, Werribee, Williamstown, Essendon

=== Round 9 ===
	Round 9
Friday, 22 May (7:05pm)	Williamstown 11.23 (89)	def. by	Box Hill 14.10 (94)	DSV Stadium	Report
Saturday, 23 May (10:00am)	Richmond 14.5 (89)	def. by	Essendon 15.17 (107)	Windy Hill	Report
Saturday, 23 May (11:05am)	Southport 16.14 (110)	def.	Port Melbourne 11.12 (78)	Fankhauser Reserve	Report
Saturday, 23 May (11:05am)	Werribee 19.12 (126)	def.	Collingwood 14.11 (95)	Avalon Airport Oval	Report
Saturday, 23 May (12:05pm)	Geelong 12.18 (90)	def.	Sydney 10.16 (76)	GMHBA Stadium	Report
Saturday, 23 May (1:30pm)	North Melbourne 13.12 (90)	def.	Gold Coast 11.11 (77)	Arden Street Oval	Report
Saturday, 23 May (7:05pm)	Frankston 6.16 (52)	def. by	Sandringham 8.12 (60)	Kinetic Stadium	Report
Sunday, 24 May (11:05am)	Casey 21.10 (136)	def.	Footscray 14.17 (101)	Casey Fields	Report
Sunday, 24 May (1:05pm)	Coburg 16.14 (110)	def.	Carlton 10.14 (74)	Barry Plant Park	Report
Sunday, 24 May (4:00pm)	Greater Western Sydney 16.6 (102)	def.	Brisbane 10.12 (72)	ENGIE Stadium	Report
	Bye; St Kilda, Tasmania
The Geelong v Sydney match, which was scheduled to be played on 24 May at 11:05am, was moved to 23 May at 12:05pm as a curtain-raiser to the round 11 AFL match between the same clubs.

=== Round 10 ===
	Round 10
Saturday, 30 May (10:00am)	Sydney 9.14 (68)	def. by	Richmond 12.8 (80)	Tramway Oval	Report
Saturday, 30 May (12:05pm)	Carlton 12.9 (81)	def. by	Geelong 20.11 (131)	Ikon Park	Report
Saturday, 30 May (2:05pm)	St Kilda 14.8 (92)	def.	Box Hill 9.4 (58)	RSEA Park	Report
Saturday, 30 May (3:05pm)	Footscray 14.8 (92)	def.	Collingwood 10.12 (72)	Mission Whitten Oval	Report
Sunday, 31 May (11:05am)	Casey 12.5 (77)	def.	Greater Western Sydney 9.9 (63)	Casey Fields	Report
Sunday, 31 May (11:05am)	Brisbane 17.6 (108)	def. by	Frankston 20.15 (135)	Brighton Homes Arena	Report
Sunday, 31 May (12:05pm)	Essendon 18.6 (114)	def. by	Werribee 27.12 (174)	Windy Hill	Report
Sunday, 31 May (1:05pm)	Coburg 12.19 (91)	def.	Williamstown 10.13 (73)	Barry Plant Park	Report
Sunday, 31 May (1:05pm)	Port Melbourne 16.8 (104)	def.	Tasmania 14.16 (100)	ETU Stadium	Report
	Bye; Sandringham, Gold Coast, North Melbourne, Southport

=== Round 11 ===
	Round 11
Saturday, 6 June (10:05am)	Tasmania 15.14 (104)	def.	North Melbourne 13.12 (90)	North Hobart Oval (crowd: 4,107)	Report
Saturday, 6 June (12:05pm)	Frankston 21.7 (133)	def.	Southport 12.12 (84)	Kinetic Stadium (crowd: 1,110)	Report
Saturday, 6 June (12:05pm)	Collingwood 9.14 (68)	def.	Casey 8.8 (56)	Casey Fields	Report
Saturday, 6 June (1:30pm)	Gold Coast 12.13 (85)	def.	Brisbane 9.14 (68)	People First Stadium	Report
Saturday, 6 June (2:05pm)	Box Hill 10.13 (73)	def.	Footscray 9.11 (65)	Box Hill City Oval	Report
Saturday, 6 June (2:05pm)	Werribee 16.11 (107)	def.	Coburg 6.12 (48)	Avalon Airport Oval	Report
Saturday, 6 June (2:35pm)	Sandringham 5.6 (36)	def. by	Geelong 13.16 (94)	Trevor Barker Beach Oval	Report
Sunday, 7 June (12:15pm)	Sydney 17.5 (107)	def. by	St Kilda 16.14 (110)	Tramway Oval	Report
Sunday, 7 June (2:05pm)	Essendon 14.9 (93)	def.	Carlton 11.19 (85)	Windy Hill	Report
Sunday, 7 June (2:05pm)	Port Melbourne 14.16 (100)	def.	Williamstown 15.9 (99)	ETU Stadium	Report
	Bye; Richmond, Greater Western Sydney
The Collingwood v Casey fixture was moved to Casey Fields due to heavy rainfall affecting the condition of the playing surface at Victoria Park.

=== Round 12 ===
	Round 12
Saturday, 13 June (10:00am)	Southport 12.10 (82)	def. by	Sydney 17.16 (118)	Fankhauser Reserve	Report
Saturday, 13 June (11:05am)	Geelong 22.15 (147)	def.	Gold Coast 5.4 (34)	GMHBA Stadium Stadium	Report
Saturday, 13 June (12:00pm)	Werribee 12.16 (88)	def.	Brisbane 9.8 (62)	Avalon Airport Oval	Report
Saturday, 13 June (12:05pm)	Footscray 6.12 (48)	def. by	Sandringham 8.11 (59)	Mission Whitten Oval	Report
Saturday, 13 June (12:05pm)	Williamstown 14.9 (93)	def.	Greater Western Sydney 11.17 (83)	DSV Stadium	Report
Saturday, 13 June (12:05pm)	Tasmania 11.19 (85)	def.	Richmond 3.4 (22)	UTAS Stadium	Report
Sunday, 14 June (11:05am)	North Melbourne 13.8 (86)	drew with	St Kilda 11.20 (86)	Arden Street Oval	Report
Sunday, 14 June (1:05pm)	Coburg 12.7 (79)	def.	Frankston 9.10 (64)	Barry Plant Park	Report
Sunday, 14 June (2:05pm)	Casey 16.11 (107)	def.	Essendon 11.9 (75)	Casey Fields	Report
	Bye; Box Hill, Carlton, Collingwood, Port Melbourne

=== Round 13 ===
	Round 13
Friday, 19 June (3:00pm)	Gold Coast 6.9 (45)	def. by	Box Hill 21.16 (142)	People First Stadium	Report
Friday, 19 June (7:35pm)	Frankston 12.7 (79)	def.	Collingwood 11.12 (78)	Kinetic Stadium	Report
Saturday, 20 June (12:05pm)	Southport 6.10 (46)	def. by	Geelong 14.9 (93)	Fankhauser Reserve	Report
Saturday, 20 June (12:05pm)	Williamstown 18.13 (121)	def.	Casey 12.12 (84)	DSV Stadium	Report
Saturday, 20 June (12:15pm)	Greater Western Sydney 24.11 (155)	def.	Carlton 12.14 (86)	ENGIE Stadium	Report
Sunday, 21 June (1:05pm)	Coburg 16.7 (103)	def.	Port Melbourne 12.14 (86)	Barry Plant Park	Report
Sunday, 21 June (1:05pm)	Sandringham 17.10 (112)	def. by	Tasmania 23.10 (148)	Trevor Barker Beach Oval	Report
Sunday, 21 June (2:05pm)	St Kilda 19.11 (125)	def.	Footscray 13.10 (88)	RSEA Park	Report
Sunday, 21 June (2:15pm)	Richmond 8.11 (59)	def. by	North Melbourne 18.14 (122)	ETU Stadium	Report
	Bye; Brisbane, Essendon, Sydney, Werribee

=== Round 14 ===
	Round 14
Friday, 26 June (11:05am)	Brisbane 21.13 (139)	def.	Tasmania 11.12 (78)	Brighton Homes Arena	Report
Saturday, 27 June (10:00am)	Carlton 8.11 (59)	def. by	Werribee 9.12 (66)	Ikon Park	Report
Saturday, 27 June (10:05am)	Box Hill 14.12 (96)	def. by	Greater Western Sydney 17.6 (108)	Box Hill City Oval	Report
Saturday, 27 June (11:05am)	Sydney 26.16 (172)	def.	Sandringham 5.9 (39)	Blacktown ISP	Report
Saturday, 27 June (12:05pm)	Collingwood 19.18 (132)	def.	Richmond 9.8 (62)	La Trobe Sports Park	Report
Saturday, 27 June (12:05pm)	Southport 14.14 (98)	def.	Williamstown 7.7 (49)	Fankhauser Reserve	Report
Sunday, 28 June (12:05pm)	North Melbourne 14.8 (92)	def.	Essendon 13.11 (89)	Arden Street Oval	Report
Sunday, 28 June (2:00pm)	Port Melbourne 9.9 (63)	def.	Gold Coast 8.9 (57)	ETU Stadium	Report
	Bye; Casey, Coburg, Footscray, Frankston, Geelong, St Kilda

=== Round 15 ===
	Round 15
Friday, 3 July (7:35pm)	Frankston 8.6 (54)	def. by	Geelong 15.16 (106)	Kinetic Stadium	Report
Saturday, 4 July (10:00am)	Collingwood 8.19 (67)	def. by	Brisbane 13.10 (88)	Barry Plant Park	Report
Saturday, 4 July (11:00am)	Gold Coast 12.8 (80)	def. by	Sydney 18.12 (120)	People First Stadium	Report
Saturday, 4 July (11:05am)	Werribee 13.13 (91)	def.	Southport 10.11 (71)	Avalon Airport Oval	Report
Saturday, 4 July (11:35am)	Tasmania 10.11 (71)	def. by	Box Hill 11.10 (76)	Dial Park (crowd: 2,800)	Report
Saturday, 4 July (12:05pm)	Richmond 10.7 (67)	def. by	Carlton 15.12 (102)	Ikon Park	Report
Saturday, 4 July (2:05pm)	Williamstown 9.6 (60)	def. by	Footscray 14.17 (101)	DSV Stadium	Report
Sunday, 5 July (10:30am)	Greater Western Sydney 8.18 (66)	def.	Coburg 9.10 (64)	Narrandera Sportsground	Report
Sunday, 5 July (12:00pm)	Essendon 18.8 (116)	def.	St Kilda 13.13 (91)	Windy Hill	Report
Sunday, 5 July (1:30pm)	Casey 9.12 (66)	def. by	Port Melbourne 12.12 (84)	Casey Fields	Report
	Bye; North Melbourne, Sandringham

=== Round 16 ===
	Round 16
Friday, 10 July (3:25pm)	Collingwood 17.16 (118)	def.	North Melbourne 11.9 (75)	Marvel Stadium	Report
Saturday, 11 July (11:05am)	Tasmania 18.14 (122)	def.	Gold Coast 10.12 (72)	North Hobart Oval (crowd: 3,627)	Report
Saturday, 11 July (12:05pm)	Geelong 23.14 (152)	def.	Richmond 11.4 (70)	GMHBA Stadium	Report
Saturday, 11 July (12:05pm)	Sydney 13.13 (91)	drew with	Williamstown 14.7 (91)	Blacktown ISP	Report
Saturday, 11 July (2:05pm)	St Kilda 9.11 (65)	def. by	Werribee 10.6 (66)	RSEA Park	Report
Sunday, 12 July (10:00am)	Brisbane 10.13 (73)	def. by	Essendon 15.13 (103)	Brighton Homes Arena	Report
Sunday, 12 July (11:05am)	Footscray 7.16 (58)	def. by	Frankston 10.11 (71)	Mission Whitten Oval	Report
Sunday, 12 July (1:05pm)	Coburg 20.8 (128)	def.	Casey 12.13 (85)	Barry Plant Park	Report
Sunday, 12 July (2:00pm)	Port Melbourne 7.14 (56)	def.	Sandringham 6.9 (45)	ETU Stadium	Report
Sunday, 12 July (2:05pm)	Box Hill 9.7 (61)	def. by	Carlton 12.12 (84)	Box Hill City Oval	Report
	Bye; Southport, Greater Western Sydney

=== Round 17 ===
	Round 17
Friday, 17 July (12:35pm)	Sydney 11.12 (78)	def.	Brisbane 9.8 (62)	Tramway Oval	Report
Saturday, 18 July (10:05am)	Sandringham 14.14 (98)	drew with	Southport 15.8 (98)	Trevor Barker Beach Oval	Report
Saturday, 18 July (12:05pm)	St Kilda 6.9 (45)	def. by	Geelong 9.17 (71)	RSEA Park	Report
Saturday, 18 July (12:35pm)	Williamstown 13.14 (92)	def.	Tasmania 11.20 (86)	DSV Stadium	Report
Sunday, 19 July (10:00am)	Essendon 17.11 (113)	def.	Coburg 8.12 (60)	Windy Hill	Report
Sunday, 19 July (10:00am)	Gold Coast 7.13 (55)	def. by	Footscray 12.11 (83)	People First Stadium	Report
Sunday, 19 July (12:05pm)	North Melbourne 9.7 (61)	def. by	Casey 14.8 (92)	Arden Street Oval	Report
Sunday, 19 July (12:35pm)	Frankston 20.11 (131)	def.	Greater Western Sydney 9.13 (67)	Kinetic Stadium	Report
Sunday, 19 July (2:05pm)	Werribee 16.13 (109)	def.	Port Melbourne 10.11 (71)	Avalon Airport Oval	Report
Sunday, 19 July (2:30pm)	Richmond 8.9 (57)	def. by	Box Hill 10.9 (69)	Box Hill City Oval	Report
	Bye; Carlton, Collingwood

=== Round 18 ===
	Round 18
Friday, 24 July (12:05pm)	Collingwood 14.19 (103)	def.	St Kilda 14.9 (93)	La Trobe Sports Park	Report
Saturday, 25 July (10:00am)	Carlton 12.5 (77)	def.	Gold Coast 7.17 (59)	Ikon Park	Report
Saturday, 25 July (10:00am)	Box Hill 6.10 (46)	def. by	Essendon 10.11 (71)	Kennedy Community Centre	Report
Saturday, 25 July (10:45am)	Brisbane 20.11 (131)	def.	North Melbourne 19.4 (118)	Brighton Homes Arena	Report
Saturday, 25 July (12:05pm)	Casey 9.9 (63)	def. by	Geelong 17.14 (116)	Casey Fields	Report
Saturday, 25 July (12:05pm)	Southport 11.14 (80)	def.	Frankston 11.7 (73)	Fankhauser Reserve	Report
Saturday, 25 July (12:35pm)	Greater Western Sydney 14.6 (90)	def. by	Sydney 25.18 (168)	ENGIE Stadium	Report
Saturday, 25 July (3:05pm)	Footscray 16.9 (105)	def.	Richmond 4.7 (31)	Mission Whitten Oval	Report
Sunday, 26 July (1:05pm)	Coburg 11.12 (78)	def.	Sandringham 9.10 (64)	Barry Plant Park	Report
	Bye; Port Melbourne, Tasmania, Werribee, Williamstown

=== Round 19 ===
	Round 19
Friday, 31 July (4:00pm)	Geelong 12.12 (84)	def. by	Collingwood 17.10 (112)	GMHBA Stadium	Report
Friday, 31 July (7:35pm)	Frankston 11.13 (79)	def.	Port Melbourne 6.13 (49)	Kinetic Stadium	Report
Saturday, 1 August (11:00am)	Carlton 19.6 (120)	def.	Brisbane 9.6 (60)	Ikon Park	Report
Saturday, 1 August (11:05am)	Sydney 12.14 (86)	def. by	Tasmania 17.14 (116)	Tramway Oval	Report
Saturday, 1 August (11:05am)	Southport 17.12 (114)	def.	Greater Western Sydney 9.19 (73)	Fankhauser Reserve	Report
Saturday, 1 August (12:05pm)	Werribee 16.6 (102)	def.	Footscray 11.16 (82)	Avalon Airport Oval	Report
Saturday, 1 August (2:05pm)	Box Hill 14.19 (103)	def.	North Melbourne 10.12 (72)	Box Hill City Oval	Report
Sunday, 2 August (10:00am)	Gold Coast 15.11 (101)	def.	Casey 14.8 (92)	People First Stadium	Report
Sunday, 2 August (2:05pm)	Sandringham 9.8 (62)	def. by	Williamstown 17.11 (113)	Trevor Barker Beach Oval	Report
	Bye; Coburg, Essendon, St Kilda, Richmond

=== Round 20 ===
	Round 20
Friday, 7 August (2:05pm)	North Melbourne 7.9 (51)	def. by	Footscray 12.25 (97)	Arden Street Oval	Report
Saturday, 8 August (11:05am)	Tasmania 14.14 (98)	def.	Werribee 12.14 (86)	North Hobart Oval (crowd: 4,803)	Report
Saturday, 8 August (12:05pm)	Essendon 10.15 (75)	def.	Collingwood 11.8 (74)	Windy Hill	Report
Saturday, 8 August (12:05pm)	Southport 4.9 (33)	def. by	Brisbane 18.23 (131)	Fankhauser Reserve	Report
Saturday, 8 August (2:00pm)	Port Melbourne 13.9 (87)	def.	Richmond 11.7 (73)	ETU Stadium	Report
Sunday, 9 August (10:00am)	St Kilda 9.14 (68)	def.	Carlton 8.13 (61)	RSEA Park	Report
Sunday, 9 August (11:00am)	Greater Western Sydney 21.7 (133)	def.	Gold Coast 18.12 (120)	Tom Wills Oval	Report
Sunday, 9 August (2:35pm)	Williamstown 6.12 (48)	def. by	Coburg 9.9 (63)	DSV Stadium	Report
	Bye; Box Hill, Casey, Frankston, Geelong, Sandringham, Sydney

=== Round 21 ===
	Round 21
Saturday, 15 August (11:05am)	Brisbane 26.17 (173)	def.	Gold Coast 11.4 (70)	Brighton Homes Arena	Report
Saturday, 15 August (12:05pm)	Coburg 14.8 (92)	def. by	Southport 15.8 (98)	Barry Plant Park	Report
Saturday, 15 August (12:05pm)	Williamstown 16.14 (110)	def.	Frankston 10.8 (68)	DSV Stadium	Report
Saturday, 15 August (1:05pm)	Essendon 18.17 (125)	def.	Sydney 15.8 (98)	Windy Hill	Report
Saturday, 15 August (2:05pm)	Port Melbourne 17.13 (115)	def.	Collingwood 14.5 (89)	ETU Stadium	Report
Saturday, 15 August (2:05pm)	Richmond 13.7 (85)	def.	St Kilda 4.13 (37)	RSEA Park	Report
Saturday, 15 August (2:05pm)	Werribee 23.10 (148)	def.	Sandringham 13.11 (89)	Avalon Airport Oval	Report
Sunday, 16 August (9:35am)	Greater Western Sydney 9.11 (65)	def. by	Tasmania 15.14 (104)	Tom Wills Oval	Report
Sunday, 16 August (10:35am)	Footscray 9.6 (60)	def. by	Carlton 13.13 (91)	Misson Whitten Oval	Report
Sunday, 16 August (12:05pm)	North Melbourne 12.7 (79)	def. by	Geelong 16.17 (113)	Arden Street Oval	Report
Sunday, 16 August (2:05pm)	Box Hill 17.10 (112)	def.	Casey 6.19 (55)	Box Hill City Oval	Report

== Ladder ==
Pos	Team	Pld	W	L	D	PF	PA	PP	Pts	Qualification
1	Geelong (R)	18	16	2	0	1941	1157	167.8	64	Finals series
2	Werribee	18	13	4	1	1699	1414	120.2	54	Finals series
3	Box Hill (P)	18	12	6	0	1657	1448	114.4	48	Finals series
4	Tasmania	18	11	6	1	1822	1603	113.7	46	Finals series
5	Essendon (R)	18	11	7	0	1743	1731	100.7	44	Finals series
6	Port Melbourne	18	11	7	0	1496	1537	97.3	44	Finals series
7	Sydney (R)	18	10	7	1	1850	1510	122.5	42	Finals series
8	Williamstown	18	10	7	1	1613	1511	106.8	42	Finals series
9	Carlton (R)	18	10	8	0	1648	1471	112.0	40	Finals series
10	Frankston	18	10	8	0	1554	1504	103.3	40	Finals series
11	Coburg	18	10	8	0	1539	1495	102.9	40	
12	Greater Western Sydney (R)	18	10	8	0	1718	1729	99.4	40	
13	Southport	18	9	8	1	1594	1685	94.6	38	
14	Footscray (R)	18	8	10	0	1565	1477	106.0	32	
15	St Kilda (R)	18	7	10	1	1484	1546	96.0	30	
16	Collingwood (R)	18	7	11	0	1603	1653	97.0	28	
17	North Melbourne (R)	18	6	11	1	1591	1729	92.0	26	
18	Brisbane (R)	18	6	12	0	1628	1703	95.6	24	
19	Casey	18	6	12	0	1451	1805	80.4	24	
20	Sandringham	18	4	13	1	1328	1806	73.5	18	
21	Richmond (R)	18	4	14	0	1234	1632	75.6	16	
22	Gold Coast (R)	18	3	15	0	1356	1968	68.9	12	

Source: AFL.com.au
Rules for classification: 1) points; 2) percentage; 3) number of points for
(R) Club is the reserves team of a senior club of the Australian Football League
(P) Premiers

=== Progression by round ===
4	Finished the round in first place	0	Finished the round in last place
4	Finished the round inside the top ten		
4_{1}	Subscript indicates the ladder position at the end of the round		
4_{1}	Underlined points indicate the team had a bye that round		

Team	Home-and-away season																				
Team	1	2	3	4	5	6	7	8	9	10	11	12	13	14	15	16	17	18	19	20	21
Box Hill	4_{4}	4_{12}	4_{11}	8_{7}	12_{6}	16_{5}	16_{6}	20_{6}	24_{3}	24_{3}	28_{2}	28_{3}	32_{2}	32_{4}	36_{4}	36_{4}	40_{3}	40_{4}	44_{3}	44_{3}	48_{3}
Brisbane	0_{19}	0_{17}	0_{20}	4_{15}	4_{19}	4_{21}	4_{21}	4_{22}	4_{22}	4_{22}	4_{22}	4_{22}	4_{22}	8_{21}	12_{20}	12_{20}	12_{20}	16_{20}	16_{20}	20_{19}	24_{18}
Carlton	0_{20}	0_{15}	0_{19}	4_{14}	8_{9}	12_{8}	16_{4}	20_{2}	20_{4}	20_{6}	20_{9}	20_{12}	20_{13}	20_{14}	24_{13}	28_{11}	28_{12}	32_{12}	36_{8}	36_{12}	40_{9}
Casey	0_{13}	0_{21}	4_{15}	4_{19}	8_{15}	8_{17}	8_{20}	8_{20}	12_{18}	16_{17}	16_{17}	20_{15}	20_{16}	20_{16}	20_{17}	20_{18}	24_{17}	24_{18}	24_{18}	24_{18}	24_{19}
Coburg	0_{12}	4_{7}	4_{14}	4_{18}	4_{22}	8_{16}	12_{11}	12_{13}	16_{10}	20_{8}	20_{13}	24_{9}	28_{8}	28_{9}	28_{8}	32_{8}	32_{10}	36_{7}	36_{9}	40_{7}	40_{11}
Collingwood	0_{21}	0_{16}	4_{9}	4_{16}	8_{11}	8_{14}	8_{17}	8_{18}	8_{20}	8_{20}	12_{19}	12_{20}	12_{19}	16_{18}	16_{18}	20_{17}	20_{18}	24_{17}	28_{15}	28_{16}	28_{16}
Essendon	0_{18}	4_{14}	4_{18}	8_{13}	8_{18}	8_{19}	12_{15}	12_{16}	16_{14}	16_{16}	20_{14}	20_{14}	20_{15}	20_{15}	24_{15}	28_{12}	32_{11}	36_{8}	36_{11}	40_{9}	44_{5}
Footscray	4_{5}	4_{5}	8_{3}	12_{1}	12_{5}	12_{7}	12_{9}	12_{12}	12_{15}	16_{13}	16_{15}	16_{17}	16_{17}	16_{17}	20_{16}	20_{16}	24_{16}	28_{14}	28_{14}	32_{14}	32_{14}
Frankston	0_{10}	4_{8}	4_{17}	4_{21}	8_{16}	12_{12}	12_{14}	16_{10}	16_{12}	20_{10}	24_{5}	24_{8}	28_{7}	28_{8}	28_{10}	32_{9}	36_{6}	36_{5}	40_{5}	40_{6}	40_{10}
Geelong	4_{1}	8_{1}	12_{1}	12_{2}	12_{1}	16_{1}	20_{1}	24_{1}	28_{1}	32_{1}	36_{1}	40_{1}	44_{1}	44_{1}	48_{1}	52_{1}	56_{1}	60_{1}	60_{1}	60_{1}	64_{1}
Gold Coast	0_{12}	0_{19}	0_{22}	0_{22}	4_{20}	4_{22}	4_{22}	4_{21}	4_{21}	4_{21}	8_{21}	8_{21}	8_{21}	8_{22}	8_{22}	8_{22}	8_{22}	8_{22}	12_{22}	12_{22}	12_{22}
Greater Western Sydney	4_{3}	8_{2}	8_{4}	8_{8}	12_{2}	16_{2}	16_{5}	20_{4}	24_{2}	24_{2}	24_{4}	24_{6}	28_{5}	32_{3}	36_{3}	36_{3}	36_{5}	36_{6}	36_{10}	40_{8}	40_{12}
North Melbourne	0_{22}	0_{18}	4_{10}	8_{5}	8_{12}	8_{15}	12_{10}	12_{14}	16_{11}	16_{14}	16_{16}	18_{16}	22_{12}	26_{11}	26_{11}	26_{13}	26_{14}	26_{16}	26_{17}	26_{17}	26_{17}
Port Melbourne	4_{8}	4_{9}	4_{12}	4_{20}	8_{14}	12_{10}	12_{12}	16_{9}	16_{13}	20_{11}	24_{6}	24_{10}	24_{11}	28_{10}	32_{6}	36_{5}	36_{7}	36_{9}	36_{12}	40_{10}	44_{6}
Richmond	4_{2}	4_{6}	8_{5}	8_{6}	8_{10}	8_{13}	8_{16}	8_{17}	8_{19}	12_{18}	12_{18}	12_{19}	12_{20}	12_{20}	12_{21}	12_{21}	12_{21}	12_{21}	12_{21}	12_{21}	16_{21}
Sandringham	0_{11}	4_{10}	8_{8}	8_{12}	8_{17}	8_{18}	8_{19}	8_{19}	12_{17}	12_{19}	12_{20}	16_{18}	16_{18}	16_{19}	16_{19}	16_{19}	18_{19}	18_{19}	18_{19}	18_{20}	18_{20}
Southport	0_{17}	4_{13}	8_{6}	8_{10}	8_{13}	12_{9}	12_{13}	16_{8}	20_{7}	20_{9}	20_{11}	20_{13}	20_{14}	24_{13}	24_{14}	24_{15}	26_{15}	30_{13}	34_{13}	34_{13}	38_{13}
St Kilda	0_{16}	0_{20}	0_{21}	4_{17}	4_{21}	4_{20}	8_{18}	12_{15}	12_{16}	16_{15}	20_{12}	22_{11}	26_{9}	26_{12}	26_{12}	26_{14}	26_{13}	26_{15}	26_{16}	30_{15}	30_{15}
Sydney	0_{15}	0_{22}	4_{13}	8_{9}	12_{4}	16_{4}	16_{7}	20_{3}	20_{5}	20_{5}	24_{8}	24_{5}	24_{10}	28_{6}	32_{5}	34_{6}	38_{4}	42_{3}	42_{4}	42_{4}	42_{7}
Tasmania	4_{7}	8_{3}	12_{2}	12_{3}	12_{3}	16_{3}	18_{3}	18_{7}	18_{8}	18_{12}	22_{7}	26_{4}	30_{4}	30_{5}	30_{7}	34_{7}	34_{8}	34_{10}	38_{6}	42_{5}	46_{4}
Werribee	4_{6}	4_{11}	4_{16}	8_{11}	12_{8}	12_{11}	14_{8}	14_{11}	18_{9}	22_{4}	26_{3}	30_{2}	30_{3}	34_{2}	38_{2}	42_{2}	46_{2}	46_{2}	50_{2}	50_{2}	54_{2}
Williamstown	4_{9}	8_{4}	8_{7}	12_{4}	12_{7}	16_{6}	20_{2}	20_{5}	20_{6}	20_{7}	20_{10}	24_{7}	28_{6}	28_{7}	28_{9}	30_{10}	34_{9}	34_{11}	38_{7}	38_{11}	42_{8}

== Finals series ==
=== Wildcard finals ===
	Wildcard finals
Saturday, 22 August (11:05am)	Sydney 22.14 (146)	def.	Frankston 11.12 (78)	Blacktown ISP Oval	Report
Saturday, 22 August (11:05am)	Williamstown 19.7 (121)	def.	Carlton 12.11 (83)	DSV Stadium	Report

=== Qualifying finals and elimination finals ===
	Qualifying finals
Saturday, 29 August (12:05pm)	Geelong 13.11 (89)	def.	Tasmania 9.12 (66)	GMHBA Stadium	Report
Saturday, 29 August (2:05pm)	Werribee 15.6 (96)	def. by	Box Hill 16.13 (109)	Avalon Airport Oval	Report

	Elimination finals
Saturday, 29 August (12:05pm)	Essendon 14.12 (96)	def.	Williamstown 7.9 (51)	Windy Hill	Report
Saturday, 29 August (12:35pm)	Port Melbourne 17.14 (116)	def.	Sydney 9.7 (61)	ETU Stadium	Report

=== Semi-finals ===
	Semi-finals
Saturday, 5 September (11:05am)	Tasmania 10.14 (74)	def. by	Essendon 15.11 (101)	North Hobart Oval (crowd: 8,012)	Report
Saturday, 5 September (12:05pm)	Werribee 9.15 (69)	def. by	Port Melbourne 12.13 (85)	Avalon Airport Oval	Report

=== Preliminary finals ===
	Preliminary finals
Saturday, 12 September (11:05am)	Box Hill 13.17 (95)	def.	Essendon 13.10 (88)	Box Hill City Oval	Report
Sunday, 13 September (1:35pm)	Geelong 14.12 (96)	def.	Port Melbourne 6.13 (49)	GMHBA Stadium	Report

=== Grand Final ===
2026 VFL Grand Final
Sunday, 20 September (2:05pm)	Geelong	def. by	Box Hill	Ikon Park (crowd: 12,941)
2.1 (13); 3.4 (22); 3.7 (25); 5.9 (39)	Q1; Q2; Q3; Final	3.1 (19); 6.5 (41); 8.8 (56); 8.14 (62)	Norm Goss Memorial Medal: Ollie Greeves (Box Hill); Television broadcast: ABC
Stevens, Molier, Bowes, Bews, Ballantyne	Goals	Dear 2 Schubert, Reeves, Preston, Nairn, McLaughlin, McCabe

==== Teams ====
Geelong
B:	31. Keighton Matofai-Forbes	69. Nathan Kreuger	23. Lennox Hofmann
HB:	27. Nick Driscoll	41. Cillian Burke	24. Jed Bews
C:	12. Jack Bowes	15. George Stevens	22. Hunter Holmes
HF:	50. Daniel Capiron (c)	20. Jacob Molier	25. Jesse Mellor
F:	57. Jamieson Ballantyne	2. Jay Polkinghorne	55. Jay Rantall
Foll:	37. Joe Pike	10. Mitch Knevitt	13. Jhye Clark
Int:	74. Patrick Kelly	76. Lachlan Weidemann	78. Zach Stevens
Int:	81. Tom Peirce	84. Charley Green	
Coach:	Mark Corrigan		

Box Hill
B:	26. Bodie Ryan	36. James Blanck	14. Jack Scrimshaw
HB:	31. Matt LeRay	21. Noah Mraz	62. Stu Horner (c)
C:	34. Jack Dalton	44. Henry Hustwaite	39. Flynn Perez
HF:	22. Cameron Nairn	13. Calsher Dear	38. Max Ramsden
F:	20. Finn Maginness	29. Aidan Schubert	27. Will McCabe
Foll:	7. Ned Reeves	41. Matt Hill	35. Oliver Greeves
Int:	76. Tom Farrer	50. Brodie McLaughlin	32. Cody Anderson
Int:	73. Corey Preston	58. Trent Bianco	
Coach:	David Mirra		

== Win–loss table ==
Home matches are indicated in bold.

+	Win		Eliminated
−	Loss	X	Bye
	Draw		

Team	Home-and-away season																					Finals series				
Team	1	2	3	4	5	6	7	8	9	10	11	12	13	14	15	16	17	18	19	20	21	FW1	FW2	FW3	FW4	GF
Box Hill	**SYD** **+36**	GEE -47	CAS -4	PM +73	SAN +20	**COL** **+9**	X	**RIC** **+1**	WIL +5	STK -34	**FOO** **+8**	X	GCS +97	**GWS** **-12**	TAS +5	**CAR** **-23**	RIC +12	**ESS** **-25**	**NM** **+31**	X	**CAS** **+57**	X	WER +13	X	**ESS** **+7**	GEE +23
Brisbane	X	**SOU** **-21**	**SAN** **-7**	CAS +38	**PM** **-45**	COB -65	X	**GEE** **-66**	GWS -30	**FRA** **-27**	GCS -17	WER -26	X	**TAS** **+61**	COL +21	**ESS** **-30**	SYD -16	**NM** **+13**	CAR -60	SOU +98	**GCS** **+103**					
Carlton	X	**WIL** **-5**	NM -11	**COL** **+31**	TAS +25	**STK** **+5**	CAS +122	**FOO** **+20**	COB -36	**GEE** **-50**	ESS -8	X	GWS -69	**WER** **-7**	RIC +35	BOX +23	X	**GCS** **+18**	**BRI** **+60**	STK -7	FOO +31	WIL -38				
Casey	FOO -43	X	**BOX** **+4**	**BRI** **-38**	**RIC** **+27**	SYD -17	**CAR** **-122**	STK -48	**FOO** **+35**	**GWS** **+14**	COL -12	**ESS** **+32**	WIL -37	X	**PM** **-18**	COB -43	NM +31	**GEE** **-53**	GCS -9	X	BOX -57					
Coburg	TAS -17	RIC +23	**COL** **-45**	**STK** **-29**	FRA -33	**BRI** **+65**	SOU +43	X	**CAR** **+36**	**WIL** **+18**	WER -59	**FRA** **+15**	**PM** **+17**	X	GWS -2	**CAS** **+43**	ESS -53	**SAN** **+14**	X	WIL +15	**SOU** **-6**					
Collingwood	X	**GWS** **-16**	COB +45	CAR -31	**ESS** **+11**	BOX -9	**GEE** **-61**	SYD -52	WER -31	FOO -20	**CAS** **+12**	X	FRA -1	**RIC** **+70**	**BRI** **-21**	**NM** **+43**	X	**STK** **+10**	GEE +28	ESS -1	PM -26					
Essendon	GEE -85	**NM** **+19**	FOO -47	GCS +6	COL -11	**WIL** **-13**	GWS +51	X	RIC +18	**WER** **-60**	**CAR** **+8**	CAS -32	X	NM -3	**STK** **+25**	BRI +30	**COB** **+53**	BOX +25	X	**COL** **+1**	**SYD** **+27**	X	**WIL** **+45**	TAS +27	BOX -7	
Footscray	**CAS** **+43**	X	**ESS** **+47**	GEE +33	**SYD** **-59**	SOU -10	X	CAR -20	CAS -35	**COL** **+20**	BOX -8	**SAN** **-11**	STK -37	X	WIL +41	**FRA** **-13**	GCS +28	**RIC** **+74**	WER -20	NM +46	**CAR** **-31**					
Frankston	**WIL** **-2**	**STK** **+8**	**TAS** **-78**	WER -22	**COB** **+33**	RIC +12	X	GCS +39	**SAN** **-8**	BRI +27	**SOU** **+49**	COB -15	**COL** **+1**	X	**GEE** **-52**	FOO +13	**GWS** **+64**	SOU -7	**PM** **+30**	X	WIL -42	SYD -68				
Geelong	**ESS** **+85**	**BOX** **+47**	WER +44	**FOO** **-33**	X	**NM** **+13**	COL +61	BRI +66	**SYD** **+14**	CAR +50	SAN +58	**GCS** **+113**	SOU +47	X	FRA +52	**RIC** **+82**	STK +26	CAS +53	**COL** **-28**	X	NM +34	X	**TAS** **+23**	X	**PM** **+47**	BOX -23
Gold Coast	**WER** **-15**	X	SOU -76	**ESS** **-6**	STK +35	**GWS** **-56**	X	**FRA** **-39**	NM -13	X	**BRI** **+17**	GEE -113	**BOX** **-97**	PM -6	**SYD** **-40**	TAS -50	**FOO** **-28**	CAR -18	**CAS** **+9**	GWS -13	BRI -103					
Greater Western Sydney	**STK** **+44**	COL +16	X	SYD -22	**NM** **+63**	GCS +56	**ESS** **-51**	SAN +3	**BRI** **+30**	CAS -14	X	WIL -10	**CAR** **+69**	BOX +12	**COB** **+2**	X	FRA -64	**SYD** **-78**	SOU -41	**GCS** **+13**	**TAS** **-39**					
North Melbourne	X	ESS -19	**CAR** **+11**	SAN +80	GWS -63	GEE -13	**SYD** **+12**	PM -13	**GCS** **+13**	X	TAS -14	**STK**; **0**	RIC +63	**ESS** **+3**	X	COL -43	**CAS** **-31**	BRI -13	BOX -31	**FOO** **-46**	**GEE** **-34**					
Port Melbourne	SAN +14	TAS -8	**SYD** **-21**	**BOX** **-73**	BRI +45	**WER** **+26**	X	**NM** **+13**	SOU -32	**TAS** **+4**	**WIL** **+1**	X	COB -17	**GCS** **+6**	CAS +18	**SAN** **+11**	WER -38	X	FRA -30	**RIC** **+14**	**COL** **+26**	X	**SYD** **+55**	WER +16	GEE -47	
Richmond	**SOU** **+40**	**COB** **-23**	STK +33	X	CAS -27	**FRA** **-12**	WIL -37	BOX -1	**ESS** **-18**	SYD +12	X	TAS -63	**NM** **-63**	COL -70	**CAR** **-35**	GEE -82	**BOX** **-12**	FOO -74	X	PM -14	**STK** **+48**					
Sandringham	**PM** **-14**	**WER** **+16**	BRI +7	**NM** **-80**	**BOX** **-20**	TAS -26	**STK** **-15**	**GWS** **-3**	FRA +8	X	**GEE** **-58**	FOO +11	**TAS** **-36**	SYD -133	X	PM -11	**SOU**; **0**	COB -14	**WIL** **-51**	X	WER -59					
Southport	RIC -40	BRI +21	**GCS** **+76**	WIL -53	X	**FOO** **+10**	**COB** **-43**	TAS +53	**PM** **+32**	X	FRA -49	**SYD** **-36**	**GEE** **-47**	**WIL** **+49**	WER -20	X	SAN; 0	**FRA** **+7**	**GWS** **+41**	**BRI** **-98**	COB +6					
St Kilda	GWS -44	FRA -8	**RIC** **-33**	COB +29	**GCS** **-35**	CAR -5	SAN +15	**CAS** **+48**	X	**BOX** **+34**	SYD +3	NM; 0	**FOO** **+37**	X	ESS -25	**WER** **-1**	**GEE** **-26**	COL -10	X	**CAR** **+7**	RIC -48					
Sydney	BOX -36	X	PM +21	**GWS** **+22**	FOO +59	**CAS** **+17**	NM -12	**COL** **+52**	GEE -14	**RIC** **-12**	**STK** **-3**	SOU +36	X	**SAN** **+133**	GCS +40	**WIL**; **0**	**BRI** **+16**	GWS +78	**TAS** **-30**	X	ESS -27	**FRA** **+68**	PM -55			
Tasmania	**COB** **+17**	**PM** **+8**	FRA +78	X	**CAR** **-25**	**SAN** **+26**	WER; 0	**SOU** **-53**	X	PM -4	**NM** **+14**	**RIC** **+63**	SAN +36	BRI -61	**BOX** **-5**	**GCS** **+50**	WIL -6	X	SYD +30	**WER** **+12**	GWS +39	X	GEE -23	**ESS** **-27**		
Werribee	GCS +15	SAN -16	**GEE** **-44**	**FRA** **+22**	WIL +25	PM -26	**TAS**; **0**	X	**COL** **+31**	ESS +60	**COB** **+59**	**BRI** **+26**	X	CAR +7	**SOU** **+20**	STK +1	**PM** **+38**	X	**FOO** **+20**	TAS -12	**SAN** **+59**	X	**BOX** **-13**	**PM** **-16**		
Williamstown	FRA +2	CAR +5	X	**SOU** **+53**	**WER** **-25**	ESS +13	**RIC** **+37**	X	**BOX** **-5**	COB -18	PM -1	**GWS** **+10**	**CAS** **+37**	SOU -49	**FOO** **-41**	SYD; 0	**TAS** **+6**	X	SAN +51	**COB** **-15**	**FRA** **+42**	**CAR** **+38**	ESS -45			

== Awards ==
- J. J. Liston Trophy (best and fairest): Trent Mynott (Frankston) & George Stevens (Geelong) – 22 votes (tied) (Note: Ben Hobbs (Port Melbourne) polled 26 votes and Jacob Dawson (Southport) polled 25 votes, but both were ineligible due to suspension.)
- Fothergill–Round–Mitchell Medal (rising star): Brady Wright (Werribee)
- Jim 'Frosty' Miller Medal (leading goalkicker): Corey Ellison (Frankston) – 52 goals
- Coaches MVP Award: Jacob Dawson (Southport) – 105 votes

=== Team of the Year ===
2026 VFL Team of the Year
B:	Stu Horner (Box Hill) (c)	Nathan Kreuger (Geelong)	Luke Parks (Williamstown)
HB:	Jackson Voss (Frankston)	Tyler Sellers (Essendon)	Donovan Toohey (Coburg)
C:	Jack Bytel (Coburg)	Jacob Dawson (Southport)	Mitch Knevitt (Geelong)
HF:	Zac Foot (Southport)	Mitch Podhajski (Coburg/Collingwood)	Jed Hagan (Tasmania)
F:	Brady Wright (Werribee)	Corey Ellison (Frankston)	Jaidyn Stephenson (Coburg)
Foll:	Ajang Kuol Mun (Werribee)	George Stevens (Geelong)	Trent Mynott (Frankston)
Int:	Hugh Dixon (Tasmania)	Ben Hobbs (Port Melbourne)	Henry Hustwaite (Box Hill)
Int:	Jye Menzie (Tasmania)	Jack Ough (Greater Western Sydney)	Jack Riding (Werribee)
Coach:	Mark Corrigan (Geelong)		

=== Club best and fairest ===
Club	Award	Winner	Ref
Box Hill	Col Austen Trophy	Henry Hustwaite	
Brisbane	Neville Fallon Award	Luke Beecken	
Brisbane	Neville Fallon Award	Luke Lloyd	
Carlton	Best and Fairest	Lachie Fogarty	
Casey	Gardner Clark Medal	Jack Henderson	
Coburg	Jim Sullivan Medal	Donovan Toohey	
Collingwood	Joseph Wren Trophy	Oskar Faulkhead	
Essendon	Best and Fairest	Tyler Sellers	
Essendon	Best and Fairest	Xavier O'Neill	
Footscray	Best and Fairest	Cooper Craig-Peters	
Frankston	Peter Geddes Medal	Jackson Voss	
Geelong	Best and Fairest	George Stevens	
Gold Coast	Player of the Year	Caleb Graham	
Greater Western Sydney	Player of the Year	Harvey Hooper	
North Melbourne	John Law Medal	Matthew Keast	
North Melbourne	John Law Medal	James Tarrant	
North Melbourne	John Law Medal	Darcy Macpherson	
Port Melbourne	Jack McFarlane Medal	Ben Hobbs	
Richmond	Guinane Medal	Mutaz El Nour	
Sandringham	Neil Bencraft Medal	Nathan Philactides	
Southport	Doc Mackenzie Medal	Jacob Dawson	
St Kilda	Best and Fairest	Hugh Boxshall	
Sydney	Player of the Year	Patrick Snell	
Tasmania	Best and Fairest	Hugh Dixon	
Werribee	Bruce Montgomery Trophy	Ajang Kuol mun	
Williamstown	Gerry Callahan Medal	Kallan Dawson	

== Representative match ==
An interstate representative match against the South Australian National Football League (SANFL) was again played during the AFL's Gather Round, marking the third successive season the fixture was scheduled. The match was played at Stratarama Stadium, the home ground of Glenelg, and was part of a double-header alongside a women's match.

=== Scoreboard ===
2026 State Game
Saturday, 11 April (2:30pm ACST)	SANFL	def. by	VFL	Stratarama Stadium
5.4 (34); 7.9 (51); 12.10 (82); 14.14 (98)	Q1; Q2; Q3; Final	3.3 (21); 7.8 (50); 11.11 (77); 15.13 (103)	Fos Williams Medal (SANFL) & Frank Johnson Medal (VFL): Tom Lewis (SANFL) & Riley Bonner (VFL); Television broadcast: Seven Network; AFL.com.au
Scully 3 McBean, Allan, Doyle 2 Hosie, Emmett, Beattie, Murley, Ryan 1	Goals	Podhajski 4 Clarke, Hagan, Brew, Tarrant 2 Hately, Billings, Declase 1
Lewis, Ryan, Scharenberg, Scully, Doyle	Best	Bonner, Hately, Bell, Parks, Podhajski

=== Victorian team ===
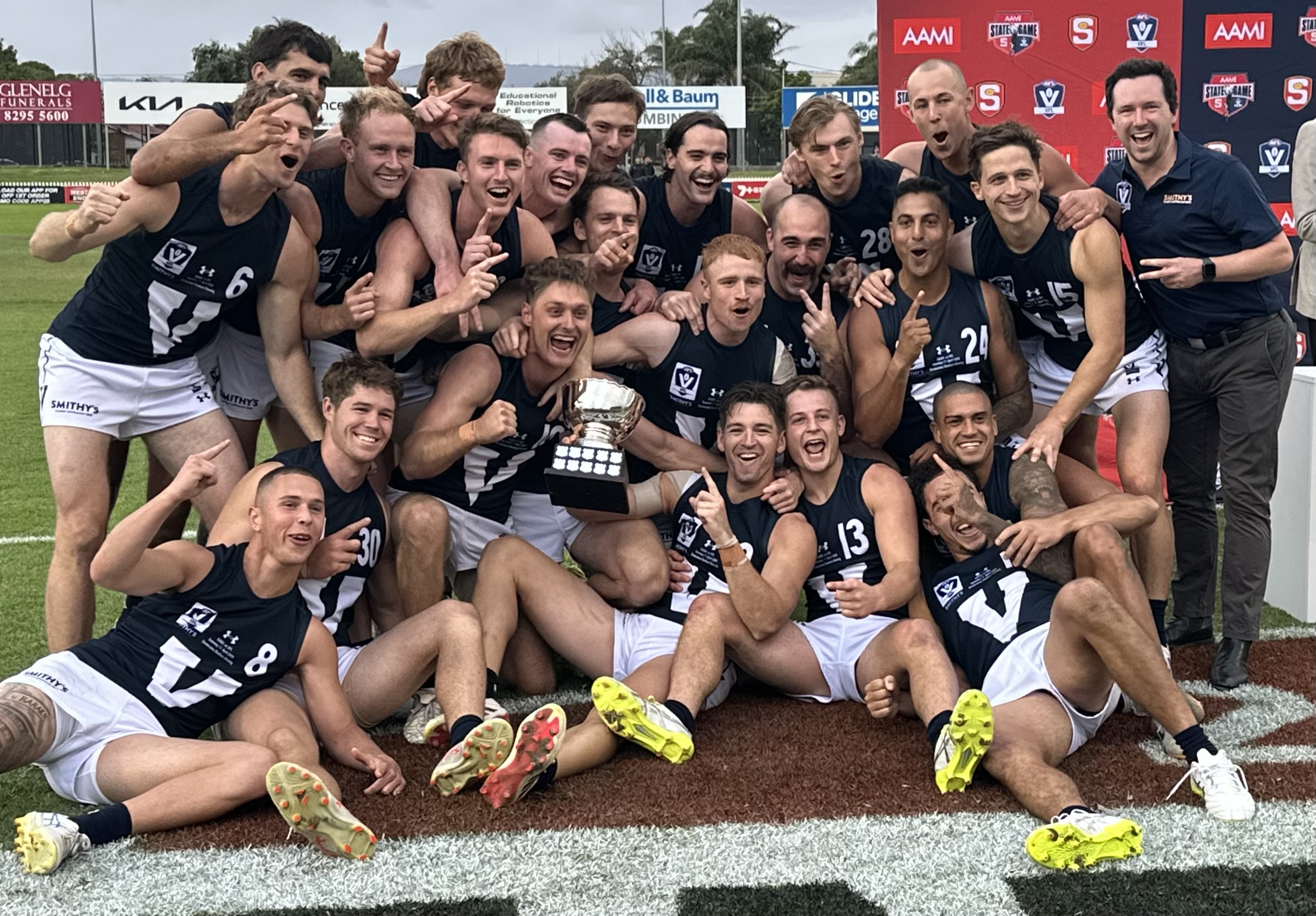
VFL players celebrate the win against the SANFL in the 2026 State Game

2026 VFL State Team
B:	12. Luke Parks; (Williamstown)	25. Ryan Eyers; (Werribee)	13. Jackson Voss; (Frankston)
HB:	9. Louis Pinnuck (c); (Werribee)	38. Jesse Clark; (Werribee)	26. Riley Bonner; (Casey)
C:	24. Kye Declase; (Box Hill)	2. Dom Brew; (Werribee)	15. Jack Billings; (Footscray)
HF:	37. Jack Riding; (Werribee)	32. Mitch Podhajski; (Coburg)	36. Jed Hagan; (Tasmania)
F:	1. Brodie McLaughlin; (Box Hill)	29. Hugh Dixon; (Tasmania)	14. Jaidyn Stephenson; (Coburg)
Foll:	35. Brayden Crossley; (Southport)	28. James Bell; (Greater Western Sydney)	10. Zac Foot; (Southport)
Int:	6. Hugo Hall-Kahan; (Williamstown)	8. Charlie Clarke; (Port Melbourne)	16. Jackson Hately; (Essendon)
Int:	30. Corey Ellison; (Frankston)	23. Harvey Hooper; (Greater Western Sydney)	
Coach:	Jackson Kornberg (Frankston)		
Emg:	5. Cooper Craig-Peters; (Footscray)	11. Marcus Herbert; (Geelong)	28. James Tarrant; (North Melbourne)
Emg:	41. Brynn Teakle; (Collingwood)		

== See also ==
- 2026 VFL Women's season
