= Robbie Chancellor =

Australian rules football coach (born 1991/1992)

- Chancellor with GWS in 2026

Personal information
- Full name: Robert Chancellor
- Born: 1991 or 1992 (age 34–35)

Coaching career
Years	Club	Games (W–L–D)
2021–2022	Western Jets	24 (8–16–0)
2023–2024	UNSW-ES	38 (18–20–0)
2026	GWS reserves	18 (8–10–0)

Career highlights
- AFL Sydney Men's Coach of the Year: 2025

Robert Chancellor (born 1991 or 1992) is an Australian rules football coach who currently serves as the backline and team defence coach at the Greater Western Sydney Giants in the Australian Football League (AFL). He previously served as the club's reserves coach in the Victorian Football League (VFL) and the head coach of the Western Jets in the NAB League Boys competition.

== Career ==
Chancellor began his career in 2008 as a football technology assistant at the Hawthorn Football Club, where he spent three seasons working under head coach Alastair Clarkson. He moved to the Melbourne Football Club in 2011 as a football and opposition analyst.

In 2013, he joined the St Kilda Football Club and moved from analysis into a coaching role, working in the coaches' box as St Kilda's Football Technology Manager. He later became an assistant coach at the club, working in the area of stoppages and structure. In late 2020, Chancellor was appointed as the head coach of the Western Jets in the NAB League Boys competition, while also working as a football coach at the Maribyrnong Sports Academy.

After two seasons at the Western Jets, Chancellor joined the Greater Western Sydney Giants in the Australian Football League (AFL) in September 2022 as the club's head of development. Two months later, Chancellor was arrested and charged with one count of possession of a prohibited drug after being found with cocaine in the Sydney suburb of Marrickville. He pled guilty to the charge and was dismissed by the club on 24 January 2023.

Following his departure from the Giants, Chancellor joined the Port Melbourne Football Club in the Victorian Football League (VFL) as an assistant coach for the 2023 season. He signed with the UNSW-Eastern Suburbs Bulldogs (UNSW-ES) in 2024 as the club's senior men's coach in the AFL Sydney Premier Division competition and remained in the role for the 2025 season, leading UNSW-ES to a preliminary final and earning recognition as the AFL Sydney Men's Coach of the Year.

In September 2025, Chancellor returned to Greater Western Sydney and was appointed the club's VFL coach, taking over from Wayne Cripps. He led the club to a twelfth-placed finish in the 2026 season, narrowly missing out on the finals series by percentage. On 16 October 2026, the Giants announced Chancellor would move into the role of AFL backline and team defence coach in 2027.

== Statistics ==
=== Coaching statistics ===
Legend
W	Wins	L	Losses	D	Draws	W%	Winning percentage	LP	Ladder position	LT	League teams

Season	Team	League	Games	W	L	D	W %	Ladder
2021	Western Jets	NAB League	9	3	6	0	33.3%	12 / 18
2022	Western Jets	NAB League	15	5	10	0	33.3%	11 / 18
2024	UNSW-ES	AFL Sydney	18	4	14	0	22.2%	8 / 10
2025	UNSW-ES	AFL Sydney	20	14	6	0	70.0%	3 / 10
2026	Greater Western Sydney	VFL	18	8	10	0	44.4%	12 / 22
