= Marcus Herbert =

Australian rules footballer (born 2002)

Personal information
- Born: 13 August 2002 (age 24)
- Original teams: South Warrnambool (HFL); GWV Rebels (Talent League); Geelong reserves (VFL)
- Draft: No. 13, 2026 mid-season rookie draft
- Debut: Round 14, 2026, West Coast vs. North Melbourne, at Perth Stadium
- Height: 183 cm (6 ft 0 in)
- Position: Defender

Club information
- Current club: West Coast
- Number: 30

Playing career^{1}
| Years | Club | Games (Goals) |
| 2026– | West Coast | 10 (0) |
- ^{1} Playing statistics correct to the end of 2026.

Career highlights
- Geelong VFL Best and Fairest Award: 2025; VFL State Team representative squad: 2026

Marcus Herbert (born 13 August 2002) is a professional Australian rules footballer who plays for the West Coast Eagles in the Australian Football League (AFL).

== Career ==
=== Early life and career ===
Herbert played local football for the South Warrnambool Football Club in the Hampden Football Netball League (HFNL). He played for the GWV Rebels in the Talent League. In 2021, Herbert joined the Geelong reserves team in the Victorian Football League (VFL) ahead of the 2021 VFL season. In 2025, he became the side's vice-captain and won their Best and Fairest Award. In 2026, he was named as part of the VFL State Team representative squad.

=== AFL career ===
Herbert was selected by the West Coast Eagles with pick 13 of the 2026 mid-season rookie draft. He made his senior debut in round 14 of the 2026 AFL season, against North Melbourne at Perth Stadium.

== Awards and honours ==
=== Individual ===
- Geelong VFL Best and Fairest Award: 2025
- VFL State Team representative squad: 2026

== Statistics ==
Updated to the end of the 2026 season.

Legend
| G | Goals | K | Kicks | D | Disposals | T | Tackles |
| B | Behinds | H | Handballs | M | Marks |

| Season | Team | No. | Games | Totals | | | | | | | Averages (per game) | | | | | | | Votes |
| Season | Team | No. | Games | G | B | K | H | D | M | T | G | B | K | H | D | M | T | Votes |
|---|---|---|---|---|---|---|---|---|---|---|---|---|---|---|---|---|---|---|
| 2026 | West Coast | 51 | 10 | 0 | 1 | 119 | 97 | 216 | 53 | 21 | 0.0 | 0.1 | 11.9 | 9.7 | 21.6 | 5.3 | 2.1 | 0 |
| Career | | | 10 | 0 | 1 | 119 | 97 | 216 | 53 | 21 | 0.0 | 0.1 | 11.9 | 9.7 | 21.6 | 5.3 | 2.1 | 0 |
