= Jye Menzie =

Australian rules footballer (born 2002)

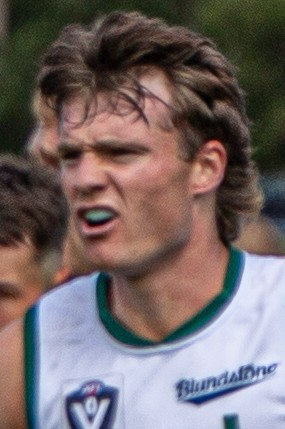
- Menzie playing for Tasmania in 2026

Personal information
- Full name: Jye Menzie
- Born: 28 October 2002 (age 24)
- Original team: North Hobart (TSL)/South Adelaide (SANFL)
- Draft: No. 15, 2022 mid-season rookie draft
- Debut: Round 20, 2022, Essendon vs. North Melbourne, at Docklands Stadium
- Height: 180 cm (5 ft 11 in)
- Weight: 84 kg (185 lb)

Club information
- Current club: Tasmania
- Number: 1

Playing career^{1}
Years	Club	Games (Goals)
2022–2025	Essendon	47 (36)
- ^{1} Playing statistics correct to the end of the 2025 season.

Jye Menzie (born 28 October 2002) is an Australian rules footballer who plays for the Tasmania Football Club in the Victorian Football League (VFL). He previously played professionally for the Essendon Football Club in the Australian Football League (AFL).

== Career ==
=== Essendon ===
Menzie was drafted by Essendon with pick 15 in the 2022 mid-season rookie draft. Menzie was Essendon's second selection in the mid-season rookie draft, having earlier taken Massimo D'Ambrosio as well.

Menzie made his AFL debut for Essendon in round 20 of his first season, starting at the medical sub against North Melbourne at Marvel Stadium. Menzie's only other game for the season came in round 23 against Richmond at the Melbourne Cricket Ground, where Menzie was once again the medical sub. He was substituted on and went on to kick his first career goal. After initially being drafted on a 6-month contract, Menzie secured a one-year contract extension to remain at Essendon for the 2023 season.

Menzie impressed throughout the 2023 pre-season, including a 3-goal performance in a scratch match against Gold Coast, enough to win selection in Essendon's round 1 team.

At the end of the 2025 AFL season, Menzie was delisted after 47 games across three-and-a-half seasons at Essendon.

=== Tasmania ===
On 30 September 2025, Menzie became the first player to be signed by the Tasmania Football Club, joining the club for its inaugural Victorian Football League (VFL) season in 2026. Menzie impressed immediately with Tasmania, kicking 29 goals in seventeen games, as Tasmania finished fourth in their debut season. However, Tasmania would exit the finals series in straight sets, losing a semi-final at home to Menzie's former team, Essendon.

== Statistics ==
Updated to the end of the 2025 season.

Legend
G	Goals	K	Kicks	D	Disposals	T	Tackles
B	Behinds	H	Handballs	M	Marks

Season	Team	No.	Games	Totals							Averages (per game)							Votes
Season	Team	No.	Games	G	B	K	H	D	M	T	G	B	K	H	D	M	T	Votes
2022	Essendon	47	2	1	0	10	9	19	7	3	0.5	0.0	5.0	4.5	9.5	3.5	1.5	0
2023	Essendon	47	21	23	11	100	82	182	47	48	1.1	0.5	4.8	3.9	8.7	2.2	2.3	0
2024	Essendon	47	14	3	5	71	55	126	38	21	0.2	0.4	5.1	3.9	9.0	2.7	1.5	0
2025	Essendon	29	10	9	7	48	27	75	32	15	0.9	0.7	4.8	2.7	7.5	3.2	1.5	0
Career			47	36	23	229	173	402	124	87	0.8	0.5	4.9	3.7	8.6	2.6	1.9	0
