= George Stevens (Australian footballer) =

Australian rules footballer (born 2005)

Personal information
- Born: 14 April 2005 (age 21)
- Original team: South Warrnambool/Greater Western Victoria Rebels
- Draft: No. 58, 2023 National draft
- Debut: Round 17, 2025, Geelong vs. Richmond, at Kardinia Park
- Height: 189 cm (6 ft 2 in)
- Position: Midfielder

Playing career^{1}
Years	Club	Games (Goals)
2024–2026	Geelong	4 (2)
- ^{1} Playing statistics correct to the end of 2026.

Career highlights
- J. J. Liston Trophy: 2026

George Stevens (born 14 April 2005) is a professional Australian rules footballer who played for the Geelong Football Club in the Australian Football League (AFL).

== Junior career ==
Stevens played for South Warrnambool in the Hampden Football League.

Stevens played in the Talent League for the Greater Western Victoria Rebels. After missing the entire 2022 season due to a ruptured ACL, he averaged 28.8 disposals in 2023. He also represented Vic Country in the Under 18 Championships.

== AFL career ==
Stevens was selected by Geelong with pick 58 of the 2023 AFL draft. He made his debut in round 17 of the 2025 AFL season, ending the match with 21 disposals and a game-high eight clearances. He was also awarded a Brownlow vote for his debut performance.

At the end of 2025 his was taken off the main list and then placed onto the rookie list.

In 2026, Stevens was named in the VFL Team of the Year. He also received the 2026 J. J. Liston Trophy, being adjudged the league's best and fairest player for the 2026 VFL season. Following their grand final loss against Box Hill, Stevens was delisted by Geelong.

Stevens later signed with the Tasmania Devils for the upcoming 2027 VFL season. It is understood that Stevens will then be added to its inaugural senior list when the Devils enter the competition in 2028.

== Statistics ==
Updated to the end of the 2026 season.

Legend
G	Goals	K	Kicks	D	Disposals	T	Tackles
B	Behinds	H	Handballs	M	Marks

Season	Team	No.	Games	Totals							Averages (per game)							Votes
Season	Team	No.	Games	G	B	K	H	D	M	T	G	B	K	H	D	M	T	Votes
2024	Geelong	15	0	—	—	—	—	—	—	—	—	—	—	—	—	—	—	0
2025	Geelong	15	2	1	2	16	12	28	4	3	0.5	1.0	8.0	6.0	14.0	2.0	1.5	1
2026	Geelong	15	2	1	0	11	18	29	5	6	0.5	0.0	5.5	9.0	14.5	2.5	3.0	0
Career			4	2	2	27	30	57	9	9	0.5	0.5	6.8	7.5	14.3	2.3	2.3	1
