= Kennedy Community Centre =

Training and administrative ground of Hawthorn Football Club

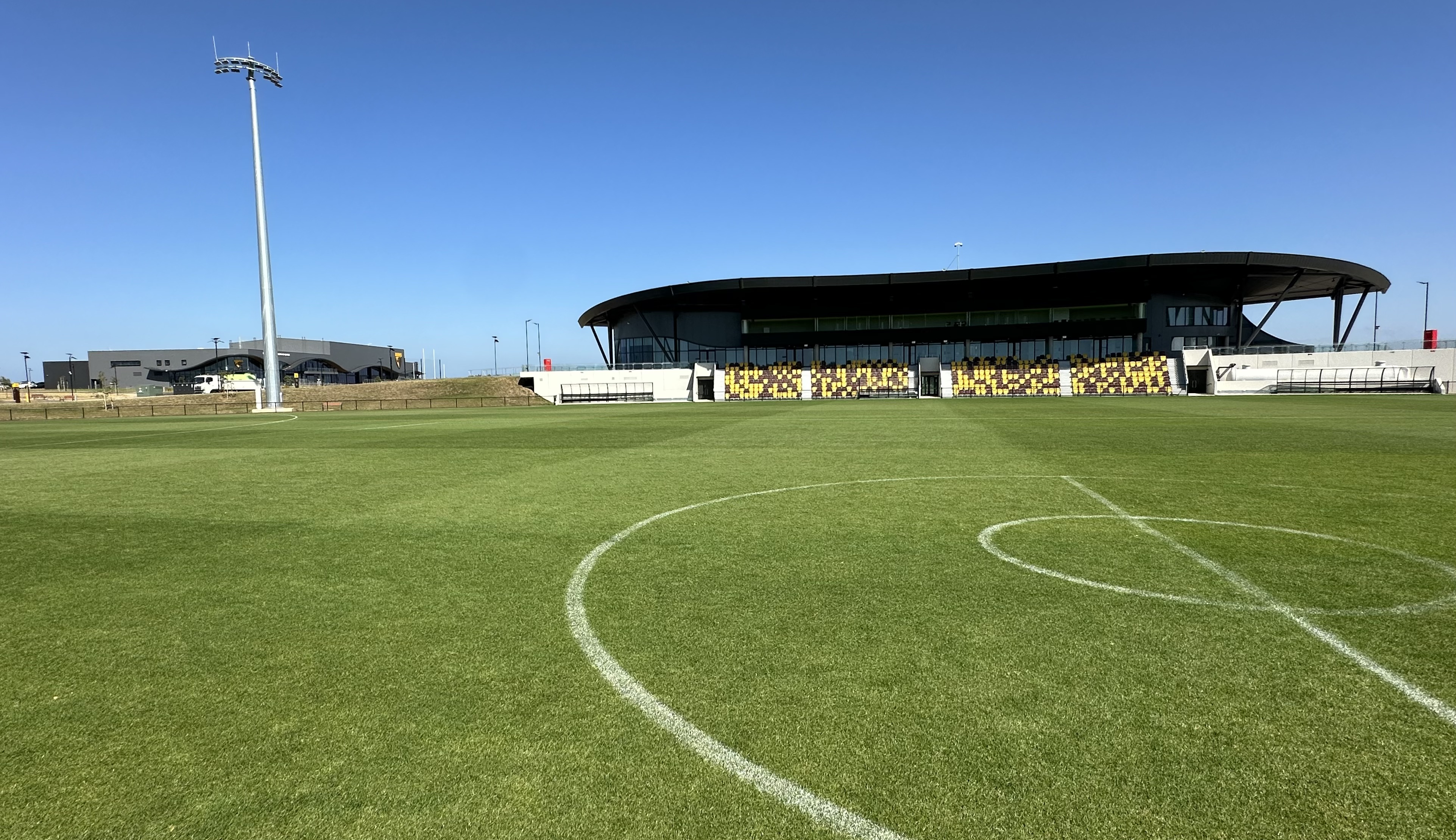
- View from the main oval in January 2026
- Interactive map of Kennedy Community Centre
- Address: 94 Tootal Rd; Dingley Village, Victoria
- Coordinates: 37.965379°S 145.126083°E
- Owner: Hawthorn Football Club
- Operator: Hawthorn Football Club
- Capacity: 3,000 (500 seated)
- Record attendance: 3,424 (Hawthorn vs Adelaide – round 4, 2026 AFL Women's season)
- Public transit: McClure Rd/Tootal Rd

Construction
- Groundbreaking: 9 February 2024
- Opened: 17 November 2025
- Architect: Peddle Thorp Architects

Tenant
- Hawthorn Football Club (2025–present)

The Kennedy Community Centre (KCC) is the training facility and headquarters of the Hawthorn Football Club, located in the south-east Melbourne suburb of Dingley Village. The complex includes two Australian rules football ovals (with plans for an additional two), elite aquatic and gym facilities for Hawthorn's men's and women's teams, an indoor training facility, and recovery facilities.

Construction began in February 2024 and was completed in September 2025, with the facility officially opened two months later.

The main oval (known as the AFLW Community Oval) hosts Hawthorn's home matches in the AFL Women's (AFLW) competition, as well as Victorian Football League (VFL) and community-level matches, and includes a pavilion with a 500-seat grandstand. The facility will be made available for public use for at least 20 hours per week.

== History ==
=== Planning ===
In 2015, Hawthorn revealed well-advanced plans to move its headquarters from Waverley Park in Mulgrave to a large new facility where it signed a contract of purchase for a 28-hectare (69-acre) site in Dingley Village, with the club intending to build a lavish new headquarters for players, administration and supporters modelled on English Premier League clubs Arsenal and Tottenham Hotspur. This came after a three-year study into the Waverley Park site concluded it was rapidly falling below the AFL benchmark. Hawthorn president Andrew Newbold said "We want an elite training facility and administration facility, to align with our values of being a destination club. That's one bucket. The next is if you've got 80,000 members, how do you engage with them? We think this facility can tick that box." A former landfill site, the land was purchased by the Hawthorn Football Club in 2016 for $7.75 million, with the facility estimate to cost $100 million. In May 2016, the Kingston City Council approved a Notice of Decision for a planning permit and a planning scheme amendment for the Kennedy Community Centre's site, which allows for the subdivision of land and creation of a 27.9 hectare lot to be developed and used by the Hawks.

=== Construction ===
Hawthorn received approval to commence construction on the facility in November 2022, with the club signing a construction contract with ADCO Constructions the same month. The first sod was turned in February 2024, with Hawthorn President Andy Gowers, CEO Ash Klein, Senior Coach Sam Mitchell, Prime Minister Anthony Albanese, along with state and local representatives present on the occasion. The construction of the Kennedy Community Centre will be undertaken in stages, with Stage 1 to consist of the construction of a community pavilion and AFLW oval featuring full broadcast capabilities and grandstand seating, and the Harris Elite Training and Administration Facility, comprising an indoor training field, high-performance gym and aquatic facilities and an MCG-sized oval. When completed, Hawthorn will be the only team to own its own facility and the land on which it is situated.

The construction of the Kennedy Community Centre is funded through a combination of $73 million from the Hawthorn Football Club, $15 million from the Australian federal government, $15 million from the Victorian state government, $5 million from the Kingston City Council and $5 million from the Australian Football League.

=== Opening ===
Crowds watch the first AFL Women's match at Kennedy Community Centre in September 2026

Hawthorn commenced moving from Waverley Park to the Kennedy Community Centre in October 2025.

On 16 February 2026, Hawthorn defeated Geelong in an AFL pre-season match simulation on the AFLW Community Oval, marking the first match of any kind played at KCC. The Box Hill Hawks, Hawthorn's reserves affiliate in the Victorian Football League (VFL), played practice match at KCC against Port Melbourne on 13 March 2026.

The first match played for premiership points at KCC was between Box Hill and Sydney in round 1 of the 2026 VFL season, with the AFLW Community Oval being used while Box Hill City Oval underwent redevelopment. Two other VFL matches were moved from Box Hill to KCC during the 2026 season, including the first-ever night match, which was played against Collingwood in round 6.

Hawthorn played its first AFL Women's (AFLW) match at Kennedy Community Centre on 6 September 2026 against Adelaide in front of a crowd of 3,424 people.

== Facilities ==
The Kennedy Community Centre features the following facilities:

- A community pavilion and oval built to ensure gender equal facilities and public amenities, specifically for community use and engagement
- An indoor stadium for community basketball, netball, volleyball, and wheelchair AFL
- A main oval and the Harris Elite Training and Administration Facility which will cater for all Hawthorn teams equally
- Administrative spaces for community and not-for-profit organisations to share the club's resources
- Flexible education and learning spaces enabling delivery of community programs

== Naming ==
The site is named after former Hawthorn player and head coach John Kennedy Sr. The statute of Kennedy at Waverley Park was moved to the entry of the Kennedy Community Centre.

== Transport access ==
The Kennedy Community Centre has limited public transport access, but is primarily serviced by bus route 811, which stops outside the facility. The nearest railway station is Springvale.

== See also ==
- Glenferrie Oval
