= Xavier O'Neill =

Australian rules footballer (born 2000)

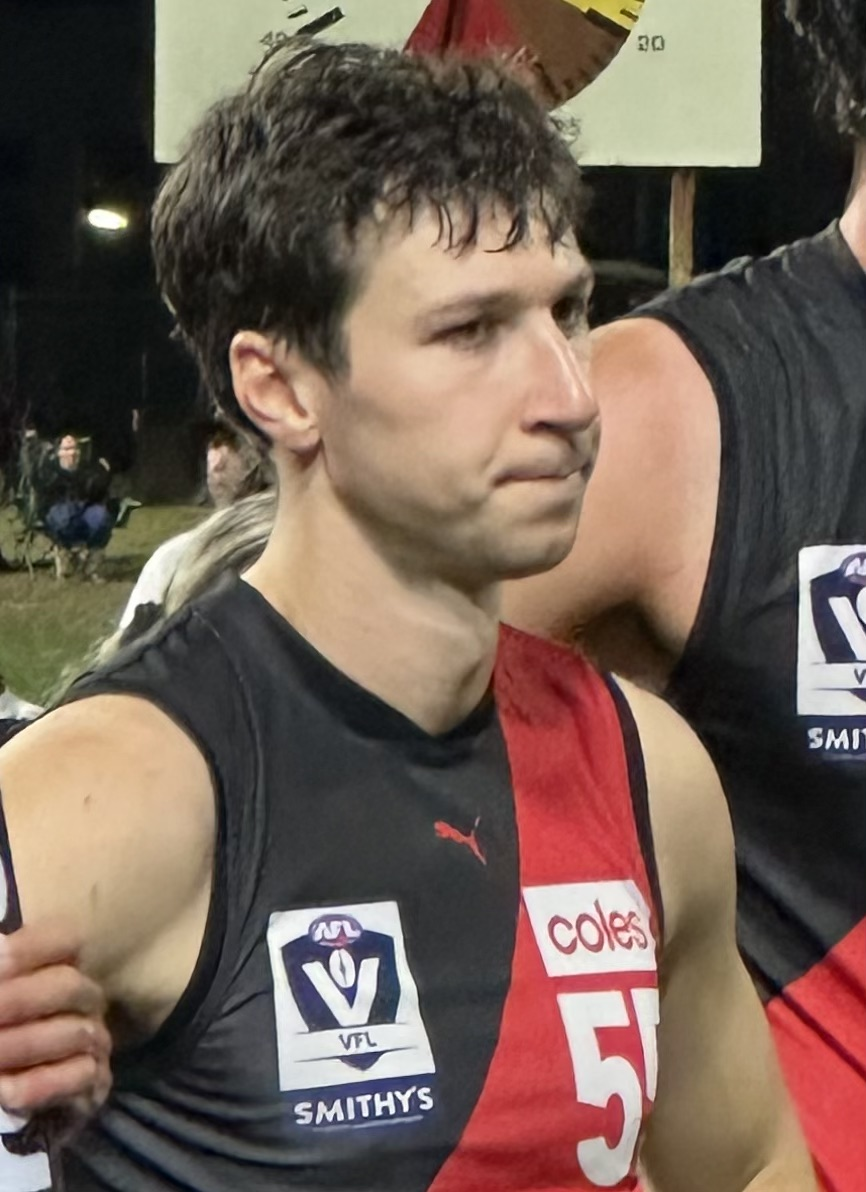
- O'Neill with Essendon reserves in 2025

Personal information
- Full name: Xavier O'Neill
- Born: 3 August 2000 (age 26); Blackburn, Victoria
- Original team: Oakleigh Chargers (NAB League)
- Draft: No. 28, 2018 AFL draft, West Coast
- Debut: 23 August 2020, West Coast vs. Greater Western Sydney, at Perth Stadium
- Height: 186 cm (6 ft 1 in)
- Weight: 84 kg (185 lb)
- Position: Midfielder

Playing career^{1}
Years	Club	Games (Goals)
2019–2023	West Coast	39 (8)
2024–	Essendon (VFL)	56 (22)
- ^{1} Playing statistics correct to the end of 2025.

Xavier O'Neill (born 3 August 2000) is an Australian rules footballer who played for the West Coast Eagles in the Australian Football League (AFL). He was recruited by the West Coast Eagles with the 28th draft pick in the 2018 AFL draft.

== Early football ==
O'Neill played junior football for the Blackburn Football Club in the Eastern Football League. O'Neill also played football for his school, Whitefriars College. He played for the Oakleigh Chargers in the NAB League. Over the two seasons O'Neill played for the Chargers in 2017 and 2018, he played 35 games, kicked 11 goals, and averaged 18.5 disposals a game. He was also named in the NAB AFL All Stars team, playing for team 'Harvey' in the Under 17s.

== AFL career ==
O'Neill debuted in West Coast's 12 point win over Greater Western Sydney in the 13th round of the 2020 AFL season. On debut, O'Neill kicked 1 goal, while also collecting 10 disposals, 1 mark and 4 tackles.

At the conclusion of the 2023 AFL season, O’Neill was delisted by West Coast.

Following his AFL career, O'Neill joined the Essendon VFL team, and was appointed as captain for his first season with the team. He won the VFL Best and Fairest alongside Tyler Sellers for season 2026.

In October 2026 he was appointed as a development coach for the Essendon AFL team.

== Statistics ==
Statistics are correct to round 2, 2021

Legend
G	Goals	K	Kicks	D	Disposals	T	Tackles
B	Behinds	H	Handballs	M	Marks

Season	Team	No.	Games	Totals							Averages (per game)						
Season	Team	No.	Games	G	B	K	H	D	M	T	G	B	K	H	D	M	T
2019	West Coast	24	0	—	—	—	—	—	—	—	—	—	—	—	—	—	—
2020 (Note: The 2020 season was played with 17 home-and-away matches per team (down from 22) and 16-minute quarters with time on (down from 20-minute quarters with time on) due to the impact of the COVID-19 pandemic.)	West Coast	24	5	1	1	25	24	49	9	9	0.2	0.2	5.0	4.8	9.8	1.8	1.8
2021	West Coast	24	2	0	0	17	13	30	4	3	0.0	0.0	8.5	6.5	15.0	2.0	1.5
Career			7	1	1	42	37	79	13	12	0.1	0.1	6.0	5.3	11.3	1.9	1.7
