= RMIT Oval =

Sports venue in Bundoora, Victoria

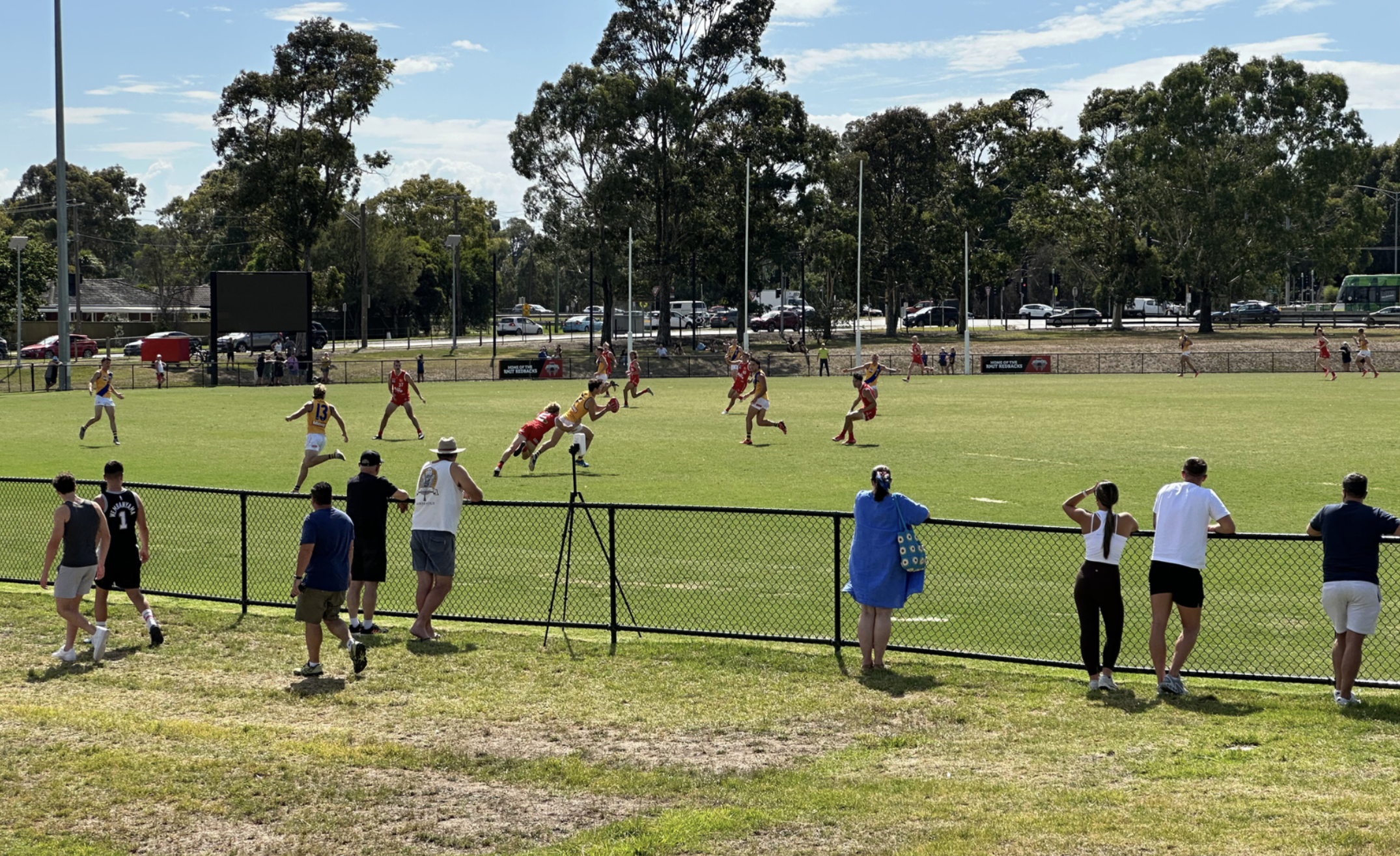
- Interactive map of RMIT Oval
- Location: Bundoora, Victoria
- Coordinates: 37.67972°S 145.06788°E
- Owner: RMIT University
- Capacity: 1,000
- Public transit: ■ RMIT/Plenty Rd; Plenty Rd/McKimmies Rd

Construction
- Renovated: 27 February 2018; 8 years ago

RMIT Oval (sometimes referred to as RMIT University Oval or Bundoora Oval) is an Australian rules football venue located in the Melbourne suburb of Bundoora. It is part of the RMIT Sports Centre, a multi-sports complex located at RMIT University's satellite campus in Bundoora.

The ground was the home of the RMIT Redbacks when it competed in the Victorian Amateur Football Association (VAFA) from 2019 until the end of the 2021 season. Since 2023, it has often been used for practice matches, including those involving Victorian Football League (VFL) clubs.

RMIT Oval matches the size of the playing surface at Docklands Stadium, although the ground has limited spectator facilities, including a lack of seating.

== History ==
RMIT Oval was unused for more than a decade because of drought-related damage that occurred in the late 2000s, with redevelopment beginning in October 2017. The ground reopened on 27 February 2018.

In 2019, the RMIT Redbacks entered the Victorian Amateur Football Association (VAFA) women's competition, playing its home matches at RMIT Oval. The club's first match at the ground was a 120-point defeat to Caulfield Grammarians in the Premier B reserves competition. In the seniors match that followed, RMIT was defeated by 56 points.

Five NAB League matches, including the season opener, were played at RMIT Oval in early 2020, prior to the season being curtailed due to the impact of the COVID-19 pandemic.

The Redbacks withdrew from the VAFA shortly before the start of the 2022 season. Since then, RMIT Oval has remained in occasional use for VAFA matches, with Coburg using the ground for a Premier Women's home match in 2024 after it was moved from Coburg City Oval. Additionally, Kew played several practice matches at the ground in March 2024. In the Northern Football Netball League (NFNL), the Fitzroy Stars played three senior matches at the ground during the 2023 season.

An electronic scoreboard was installed at the ground in 2022, which was followed by the addition of a manual scoreboard in 2024.

The Northern Bullants used RMIT Oval for training sessions during the 2025 VFL season. A practice match against Williamstown was played at the ground in February 2025. The Bullants were scheduled to play a home match at RMIT Oval against Southport on 31 May 2025, which was set to be followed by Darebin playing against the Geelong Cats in the VFL Women's (VFLW), however both matches were moved to Preston City Oval.

On 7 March 2026, RMIT Oval hosted the Tasmania Football Club's first official match, when it played Werribee in a VFL practice match.

== Transport access ==
RMIT Oval is located next to the RMIT/Plenty Road tram stop, which is the terminus for route 86.
