= Henry Hustwaite =

Australian rules footballer (born 2004)

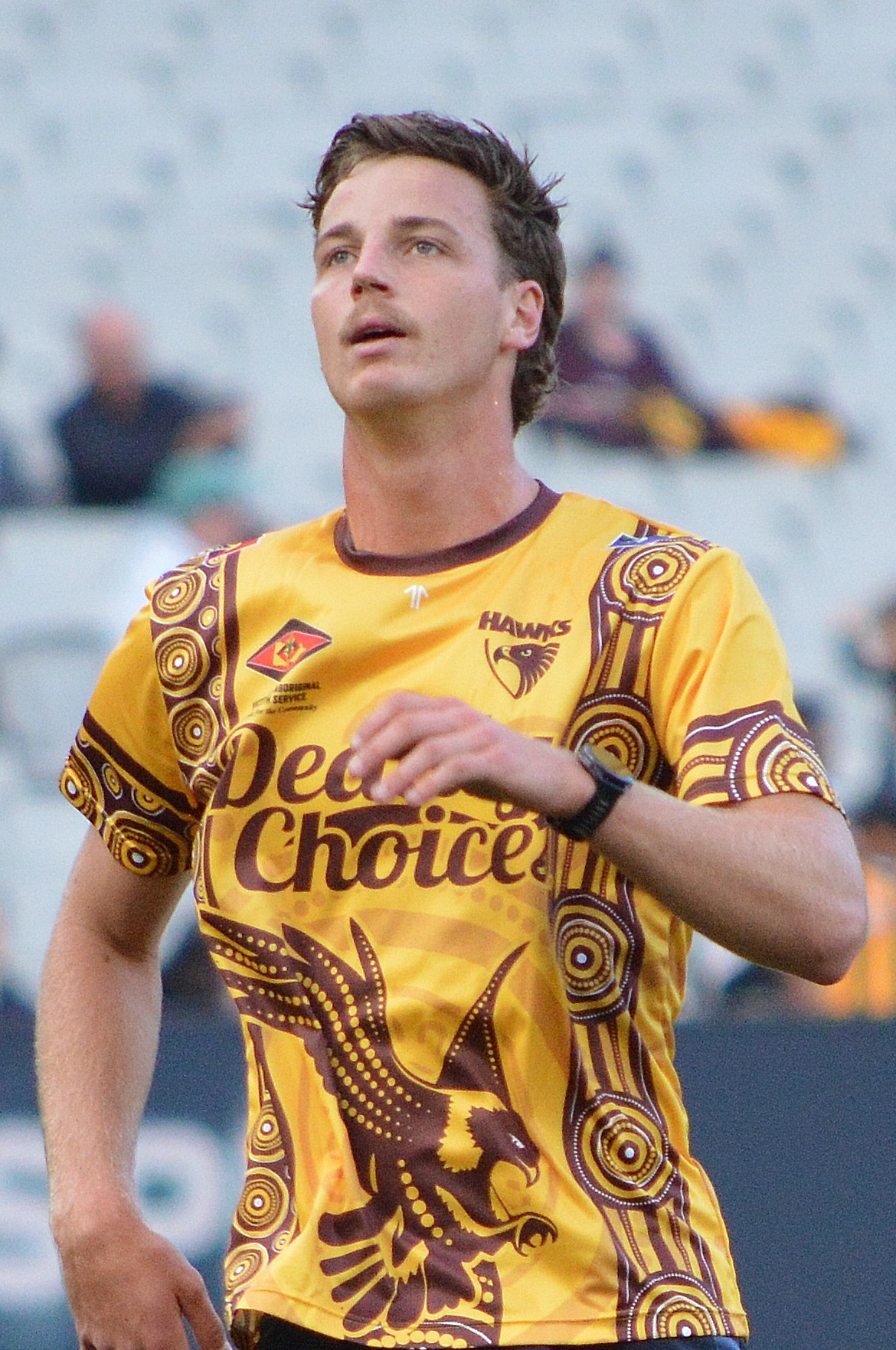
- Hustwaite in May 2026

Personal information
- Full name: Henry Hustwaite
- Born: 20 July 2004 (age 22)
- Original team: Dandenong Stingrays(NAB League)/Rosebud (MPNFL)
- Draft: No. 37, 2022 AFL draft, Hawthorn
- Debut: Round 23, 2023, Hawthorn vs. Melbourne, at MCG
- Height: 195 cm (6 ft 5 in)
- Weight: 84 kg (185 lb)
- Position: Midfielder

Playing career^{1}
Years	Club	Games (Goals)
2023–2026	Hawthorn	11 (2)
- ^{1} Playing statistics correct to the end of 2026.

Career highlights
- VFL premiership player: 2026; 2× VFL Team of the Year: 2025, 2026; Col Austen Trophy: 2026

Henry Hustwaite (born 20 July 2004) is an Australian rules footballer who most recently played for the Hawthorn Football Club in the Australian Football League (AFL).

== Early career ==
Hustwaite is a left footer who played for Rosebud juniors. At 18 he had a growth spurt where he added 10 cm in height and 10 kg in weight, this improved his chances of getting drafted. He was invited to train with the Dandenong Stingrays. He played twelve games with the Stingrays in 2022 and earned a Vic Country selection in the 2022 National Championships.

== AFL career ==
He was the thirty seventh selection in the 2022 AFL draft by Hawthorn.

After some strong performances for Hawthorn's VFL affiliate Box Hill, Hustwaite made his AFL debut against Melbourne at MCG in round 23 2023. Hustwaite kicked two goals on debut.

Hustwaite didn't see consistent football at the AFL level in 2024 or 2025, only playing four games in each season. Instead, he played the majority of his football for Box Hill, being named in the VFL Team of the Year in 2025.

After Zach Merrett requested to join Hawthorn at the end of the 2025 AFL season, it was reported that Hustwaite, along with draft picks, could be sent to Essendon in order to bring Merrett to Hawthorn. Ultimately, the trade fell through.

Hustwaite only featured once for Hawthorn in the 2026 AFL season, racking up nineteen possessions in a loss to Melbourne. Once again, Hustwaite impressed at Box Hill, making the VFL Team of the Year for the second straight season, while also winning Box Hill's best and fairest award, the Col Austen Trophy. Hustwaite completed this impressive season with 27 possessions in the VFL Grand Final, which Box Hill won against Geelong.

On 24 September, 2026, four days after winning the VFL Grand Final, Hustwaite was delisted by Hawthorn.

== Statistics ==
Updated to the end of 2026.

Legend
G	Goals	K	Kicks	D	Disposals	T	Tackles
B	Behinds	H	Handballs	M	Marks

Season	Team	No.	Games	Totals							Averages (per game)							Votes
Season	Team	No.	Games	G	B	K	H	D	M	T	G	B	K	H	D	M	T	Votes
2023	Hawthorn	44	2	2	0	10	18	28	5	8	1.0	0.0	5.0	9.0	14.0	2.5	4.0	0
2024	Hawthorn	44	4	0	0	10	16	26	1	8	0.0	0.0	2.5	4.0	6.5	0.3	2.0	0
2025	Hawthorn	44	4	0	1	23	32	55	8	14	0.0	0.3	5.8	8.0	13.8	2.0	3.5	0
2026	Hawthorn	44	1	0	0	7	12	19	1	3	0.0	0.0	7.0	12.0	19.0	1.0	3.0	0
Career			11	2	1	50	78	128	15	33	0.2	0.1	4.5	7.1	11.6	1.4	3.0	0

== Honours and achievements ==
Team

- McClelland Trophy (Hawthorn): 2024
- VFL premiership player (Box Hill): 2026

Individual

- 2× VFL Team of the Year: 2025, 2026
- Col Austen Trophy: 2026
