= La Trobe Sports Park =

Multi-sports complex in Bundoora, Victoria

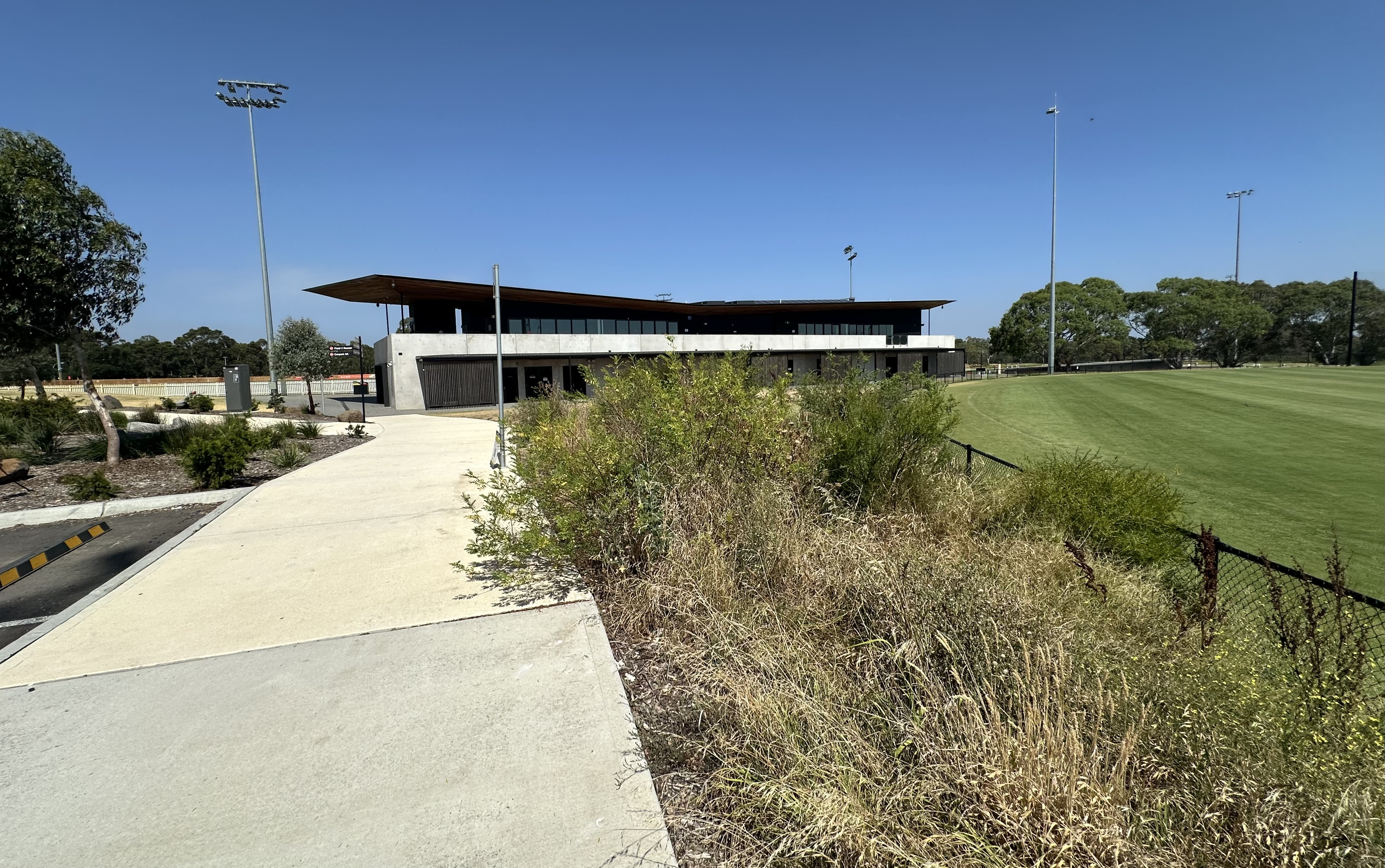
- Interactive map of La Trobe Sports Park
- Address: Plenty Rd & Kingsbury Dr; Bundoora, Victoria
- Coordinates: 37.72314°S 145.04171°E
- Operator: La Trobe University
- Capacity: Tony Sheehan Oval: 2,500; Sports Stadium: 2,250

Construction
- Opened: December 2018; 7 years ago
- Cost: A$150 million

Tenant
- La Trobe University Football Club (VAFA)

The La Trobe Sports Park is a multi-sports complex on the main campus of La Trobe University in the Melbourne suburb of Bundoora. It includes grounds for Australian rules football, cricket, soccer and baseball, as well a multipurpose indoor stadium. The Home of the Matildas is also located within the complex.

As of 2026, it is home to the La Trobe University Football Club in the Victorian Amateur Football Association (VAFA).

== History ==
The oval was officially named the Tony Sheehan Oval on 13 March 2019, after La Trobe University Football Club founding member Tony Sheehan.

Construction of the La Trobe Sports Stadium was announced on 4 April 2017 as part of the second stage of redevelopment. Following completion in January 2020, it featured six high-ball, multipurpose courts, accommodating basketball, netball, volleyball and futsal.

The third stage of redevelopment began in early 2022. This included another oval for Australian rules football and cricket, the Ganbu Djila Multipurpose Sports Field for soccer and baseball, and The Home of the Matildas.

In 2020, the Carlton Football Club was scheduled to play two of its VFL Women's (VFLW) home matches at Tony Sheehan Oval, prior to the season's cancellation because of the COVID-19 pandemic.

Tony Sheehan Oval hosted an Australian Football League (AFL) pre-season match simulation between Collingwood and Greater Western Sydney on 20 February 2026.
