= Tyler Sellers =

Australian rules footballer (born 2002)

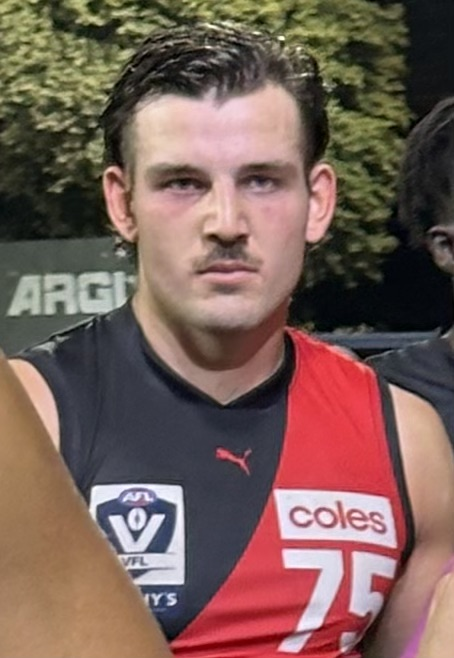
- Sellers playing for Essendon reserves in 2025

Personal information
- Full name: Tyler Sellers
- Born: 9 August 2002 (age 24)
- Original team: Old Scotch/North Melbourne (VFL)
- Draft: 2023 pre-season supplemental selection period: North Melbourne
- Debut: Round 5, 2024, North Melbourne vs. Geelong, at Kardinia Park
- Height: 193 cm (6 ft 4 in)
- Weight: 90 kg (198 lb)
- Position: Key Forward

Playing career
Years	Club	Games (Goals)
2024	North Melbourne	2 (0)

Tyler Sellers (born 9 August 2002) is a professional Australian rules footballer who played for the North Melbourne Football Club in the Australian Football League (AFL).

== AFL career ==
Sellers was recruited by North Melbourne in the Pre-season supplemental selection period of the 2023 national draft after playing for Old Scotch in the Victorian Amateur Football Association (VAFA) and North Melbourne in the Victorian Football League (VFL). He came second in the North Melbourne VFL best and fairest award in 2023 after kicking 30 goals from 16 games.

Sellers debuted for North Melbourne in round five of the 2024 AFL season in a 75-point loss to Geelong in a game which saw him collect only one disposal and one mark. He played again the following week against Hawthorn and again failed to have an impact, collecting only two disposals. He was then not selected in the AFL team for the remainder of the season, and was delisted at the end of the year.

== Statistics ==
Legend
G	Goals	K	Kicks	D	Disposals	T	Tackles
B	Behinds	H	Handballs	M	Marks

Season	Team	No.	Games	Totals							Averages (per game)							Votes
Season	Team	No.	Games	G	B	K	H	D	M	T	G	B	K	H	D	M	T	Votes
2024	North Melbourne	36	2	0	0	1	2	3	1	1	0.0	0.0	0.5	1.0	1.5	0.5	0.5	0
Career			2	0	0	1	2	3	1	1	0.0	0.0	0.5	1.0	1.5	0.5	0.5	0
