= 2025 AFL Women's Grand Final =

2025 Australian football match

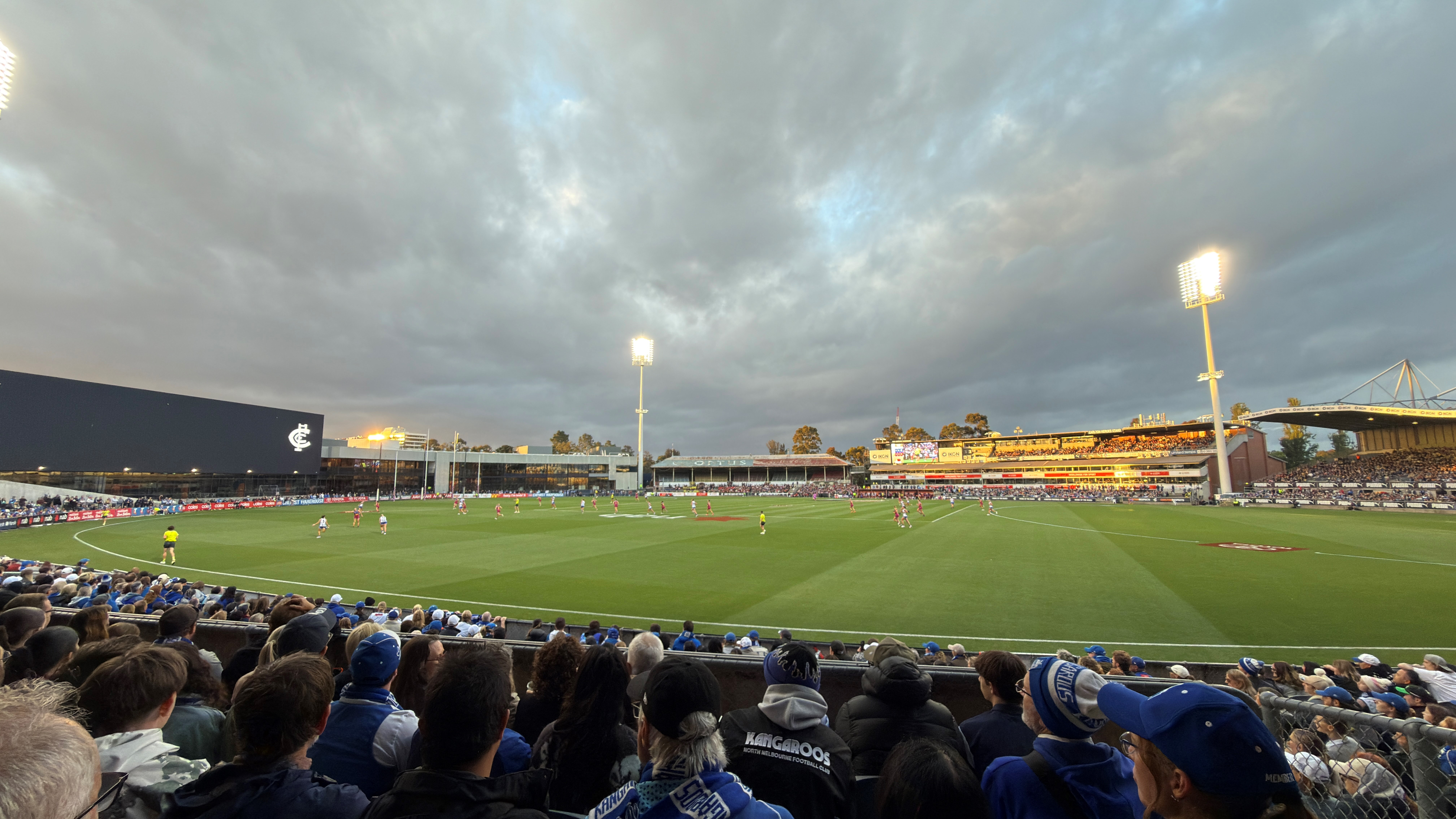
- Ikon Park pictured during the match

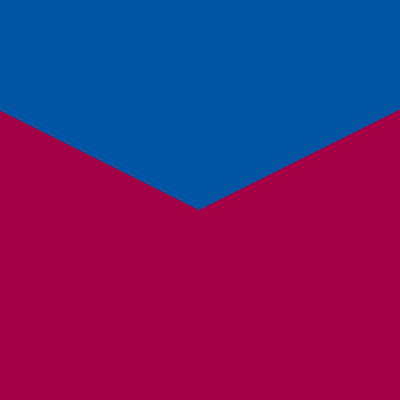
North Melbourne	Brisbane
9.2 (56)	2.4 (16)
	1	2	3	4
NM	2.0 (12)	5.0 (30)	6.0 (36)	9.2 (56)
BL	1.1 (7)	1.2 (8)	2.2 (14)	2.4 (16)
- Date: 29 November 2025
- Stadium: Ikon Park
- Attendance: 12,741
- Umpires: Gabby Simmonds, Sam Nippress, Joshua Ball

Ceremonies
- Pre-match entertainment: Peking Duk
- National anthem: Bonnie Anderson

Broadcast in Australia
- Network: Seven Network, Fox Footy
- Commentators: Alister Nicholson, Jo Wotton, Kate McCarthy, Erin Phillips

The 2025 AFL Women's Grand Final was an Australian rules football match held on 29 November 2025 at Ikon Park to determine the premiers of the tenth season of the AFL Women's (AFLW) competition. The match was played between North Melbourne and Brisbane; the third successive grand final between the teams. North Melbourne won by 40 points to claim their second premiership, and in so doing became the first team to win back-to-back AFLW flags.

== Background ==
North Melbourne entered the 2025 season as the reigning premiers, having defeated Brisbane by 30 points in the 2024 grand final. The Kangaroos dominated throughout the 2025 season, going undefeated through the home-and-away season to finish with a 12–0 record and win the club's second minor premiership. The club became the first male or female VFL/AFL team to go undefeated for 24 consecutive games following their 49-point over Hawthorn in round 12. They then held the Hawks goalless in a 39-point win in the first qualifying final before overcoming a narrow three-quarter time deficit to defeat Melbourne by 10 points in the first preliminary final. This was North's third successive grand final, having lost to the Lions in 2023 and defeating them in 2024. Kangaroos vice-captain Ash Riddell became the club's first AFLW Best and Fairest winner with 23 votes.

Brisbane came into 2025 off the back of a top-four finish the previous season, which culminated in defeat to the Kangaroos in the grand final. Despite losing three matches at home this season, the Lions again comfortably qualified for a top-four position, finishing third on the ladder with a 9–3 record at the end of the home-and-away season. The club faced Melbourne as the away side in the second qualifying final and defeated the Demons by 13 points, with back-to-back majors from Ally Anderson and Lily Postlethwaite in the final quarter sealing the victory. This guaranteed them the McClelland Trophy as the best performed club across both the men's and women's competitions for the respective seasons. They then hosted Carlton in the second preliminary final and won by 35 points, with a six-goal third quarter from the home team proving to be the difference between the sides.

North Melbourne was aiming for its second AFLW premiership following its victory in 2024 and maiden grand final in 2023, while Brisbane, making its seventh appearance in a grand final, was seeking to equal Adelaide's league-leading three premierships following premierships in 2021 and 2023. The two sides met once during the home-and-away season, with North Melbourne recording a comfortable 29-point victory at Brighton Homes Arena.

Bookmakers heavily favoured North Melbourne to win the grand final; on the Monday before the game the Kangaroos were $1.13 favorites compared to Brisbane who were distant $5.75 outsiders. The league determined the match would be played at 7.45pm local time, which replicated the nighttime timeslot first used in 2024. General manager of women's football Emma Moore confirmed Ikon Park would host all Victorian-based finals and the grand final following a rebuffed request from Melbourne to play their home qualifying final at Casey Fields. As the highest-placed winners to reach the final, North Melbourne were classified as the home team and thus the game was held at Ikon Park, a 12,500-set venue. As in 2024, the game was sold out within 24 hours.

== Entertainment ==
Electronic band Peking Duk performed a 17-minute set for the Telstra Pre-Game Entertainment, featuring guest artists Ben Woolner, KYE and Lucy Lucy. Singer, songwriter and actress Bonnie Anderson sang the Australian national anthem.

Peking Duk's setlist included "Dancing2" performed by Keli Holiday (an alias of Peking Duk member Adam Hyde), "Take Me Over" and "Say My Name" with Woolner, an unreleased song called "Thrills" with KYE, before finishing with "Fire" and "High" alongside Lucy Lucy. The performance received largely negative reviews from fans and viewers.

Scheduled on-field events
Time	Event
7:02 pm	Peking Duk performs for the Telstra Pre-Game Entertainment
7:28 pm	Teams enter the ground
7:39 pm	Delivery of the premiership cup by Cup Ambassador, Debbie Lee
7:40 pm	Welcome to Country—Wurundjeri Elder Uncle Colin Hunter Jr.
7:41 pm	The Australian National Anthem performed by Bonnie Anderson
7:43 pm	Coin toss
7:45 pm	Game starts
Half-time	Telstra Half-Time Sprint won by Lucy Single (Gold Coast)
Post game	Post game presentation

All times are in Australian Eastern Daylight Time (GMT +11)

=== Half-time sprint ===
The Telstra Half-Time Sprint lineup was announced on Friday November 28. It featured AFLW players Ebony Marinoff (Adelaide), Georgie Prespakis (Geelong), Lucy Single (Gold Coast), Molly O'Hehir (Melbourne), Zippy Fish (Sydney), Ella Roberts (West Coast), Ellie Blackburn (Western Bulldogs) and a wildcard entry, netballer Jo Weston (Australian Diamonds, Melbourne Vixens). Lucy Single won, securing $5,000 for her junior football club, the Burleigh Bombers, courtesy of Telstra.

=== Medal and cup presenters ===
The 2025 AFLW Premiership Cup Ambassador was women's football pioneer and Australian Football Hall of Fame member Debbie Lee, who delivered the cup onto the ground pre-match. Injured Kangaroos player Nicole Bresnehan presented the cup to the premiership coach Darren Crocker and premiership captain Jasmine Garner.

The Best on ground medal was awarded to Eilish Sheerin by AFL Commissioner Simone Wilkie AO. The medal for premiership coach Darren Crocker was presented by inaugural AFLW Premiership coach Bec Goddard OAM. For the first time, a medal was awarded to premiership captain Jasmine Garner, presented by three-time AFLW premiership star Erin Phillips.

== Teams ==
Both sides announced unchanged teams from their preliminary finals.

North Melbourne Tasmanian Kangaroos
B:	2 Libby Birch	20 Jasmine Ferguson	
HB:	9 Emma Kearney	11 Eliza Shannon	14 Erika O'Shea
C:	15 Amy Smith	19 Ruby Tripodi	8 Taylah Gatt
HF:	6 Alice O'Loughlin	10 Blaithin Bogue	35 Jenna Bruton
F:	16 Tahlia Randall	60 Emma King	
Foll:	26 Kim Rennie	7 Ash Riddell	25 Jasmine Garner (c)
Int:	3 Bella Eddey	4 Eilish Sheerin	5 Tess Craven
Int:	13 Vikki Wall	33 Kate Shierlaw	
Coach:	Darren Crocker		
Emg:	21 Amy Gavin Mangan	23 Mia King	24 Tessa Boyd

Brisbane
B:	20 Shannon Campbell	8 Jennifer Dunne	
HB:	3 Breanna Koenen (c)	10 Nat Grider	6 Lily Postlethwaite
C:	9 Orla O'Dwyer	18 Ally Anderson	28 Charlotte Mullins
HF:	21 Courtney Hodder	31 Taylor Smith	12 Sophie Conway
F:	25 Cathy Svarc	14 Dakota Davidson	
Foll:	2 Tahlia Hickie	5 Jade Ellenger	17 Belle Dawes
Int:	1 Eleanor Hartill	7 Ellie Hampson	11 Shanae Davison
Int:	13 Neasa Dooley	29 Ruby Svarc	
Coach:	Craig Starcevich		
Emg:	15 Poppy Boltz	16 Evie Long	22 Sophie Peters

=== Umpires ===
The umpiring panel comprised three field umpires, four boundary umpires, two goal umpires and an emergency in each position.

2025 AFLW Grand Final umpiring panel
Position					Emergency
Field	1 Gabby Simmonds (2)	7 Samuel Nippress (2)	11 Joshua Ball (1)		12 Gen Devenish
Boundary	Sam Beer (1)	Riley Guerin (1)	Madeleine Lum (1)	Cooper Ranie (1)	Mitchell O'Neill
Goal	Michael Button (1)	Jack Stammers (1)			Brad Kellett

Numbers in brackets represent the number of grand finals umpired, including 2025.

== Scoreboard ==
Grand Final
Saturday, 29 November (7:45 pm)	North Melbourne	def.	Brisbane	Ikon Park (crowd: 12,741)	afl.com.au report
2.0 (12); 5.0 (30); 6.0 (36); 9.2 (56)	Q1; Q2; Q3; Final	1.1 (7); 1.2 (8); 2.2 (14); 2.4 (16)	Umpires: Simmonds, Nippress, Ball; Best on ground: Eilish Sheerin (North Melbourne); Television broadcast: Seven Network, Fox Footy; National anthem: Bonnie Anderson
Bruton 3, Sheerin 2, Eddey, Shierlaw, Randall, Garner	Goals	Mullins, R. Svarc
Sheerin, Riddell, Garner, Bruton, Smith	Best	Dawes, Mullins, Conway, Ellenger
Smith (TBC)	Injuries	Campbell (TBC)

Celebrations gallery

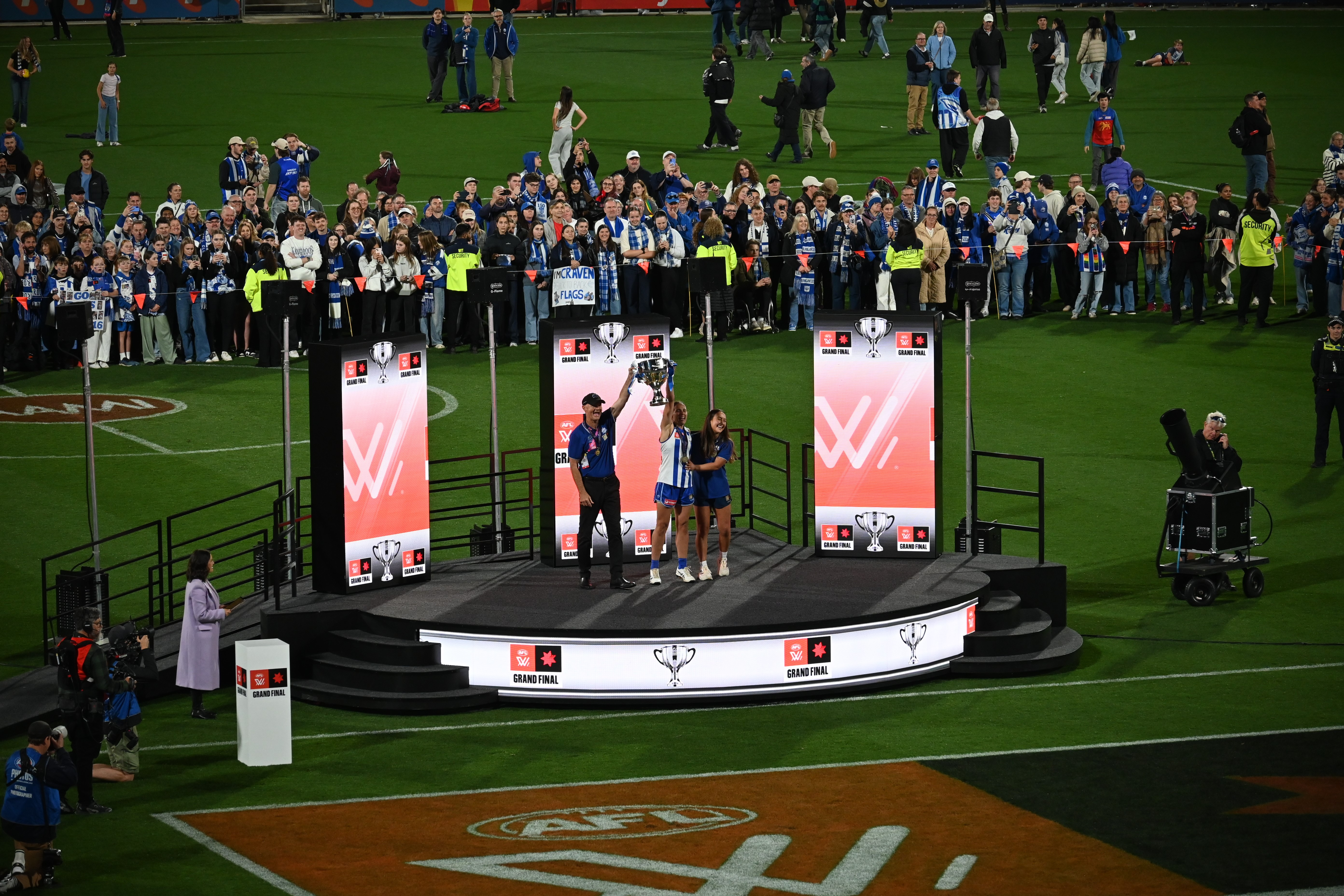
North Melbourne coach Darren Crocker (right) and captain Jasmine Garner (centre) accepted the premiership cup from injured teammate Nicole Bresnehan (right)

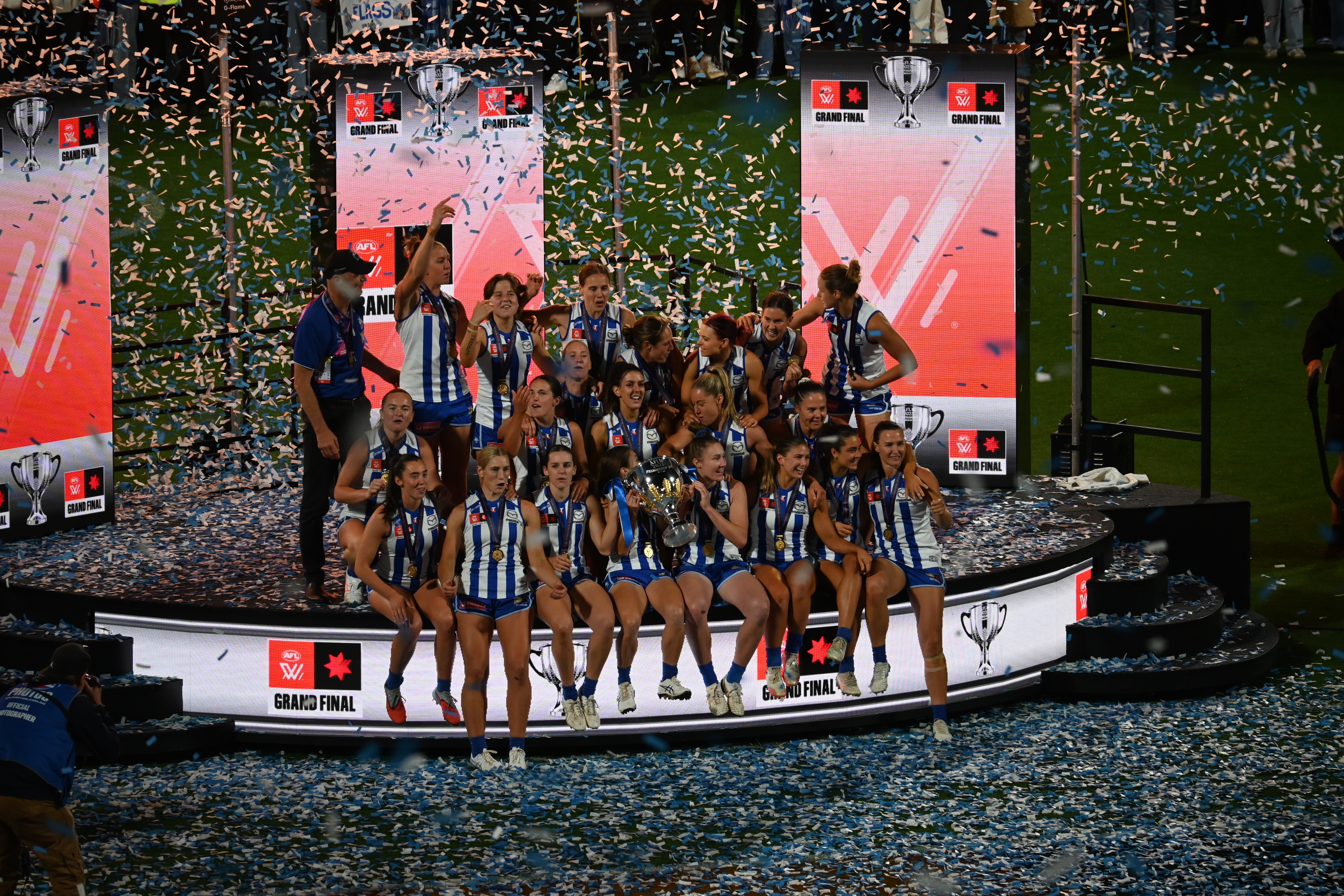
North Melbourne players with the premiership cup on the presentation stage

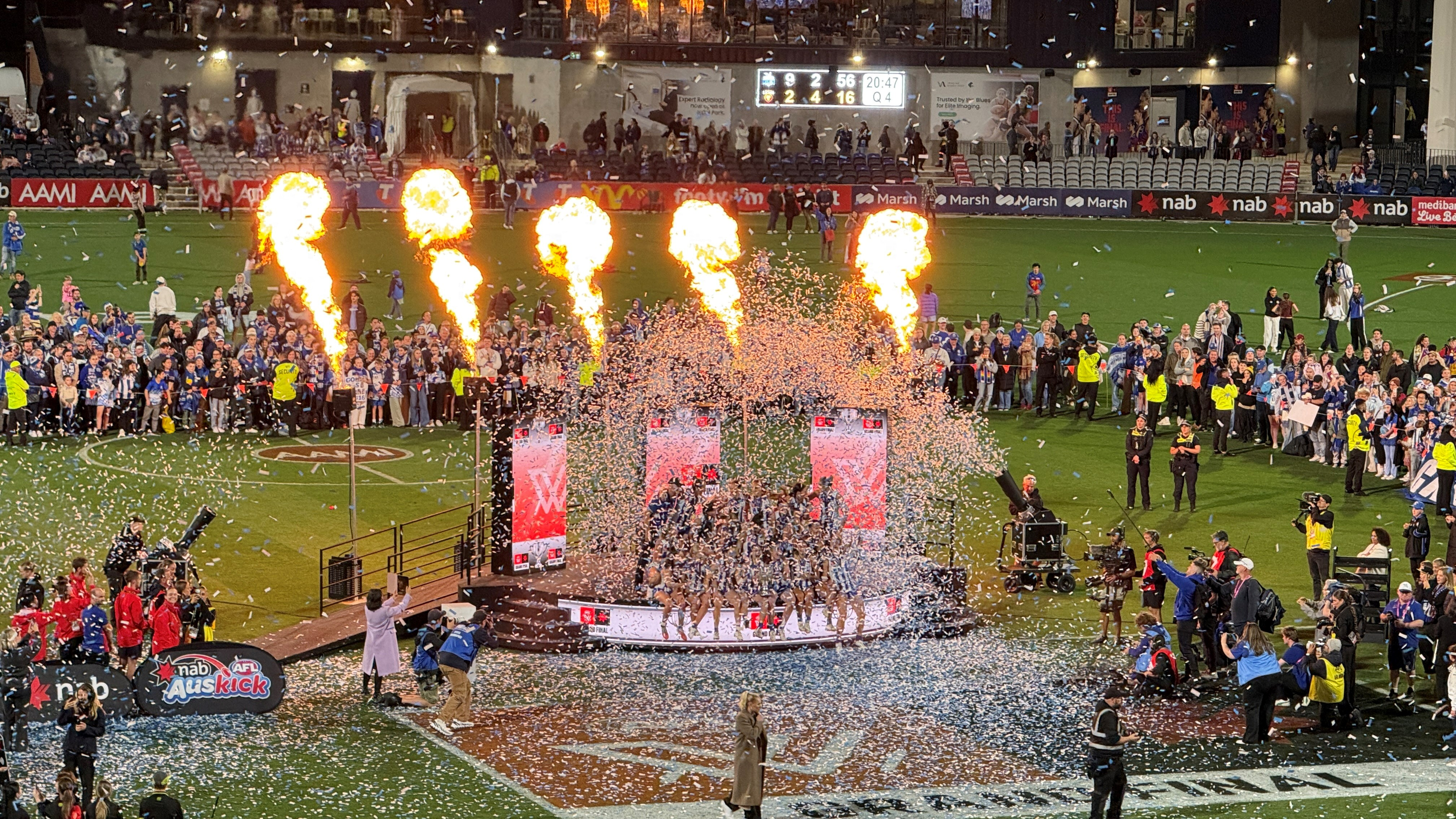

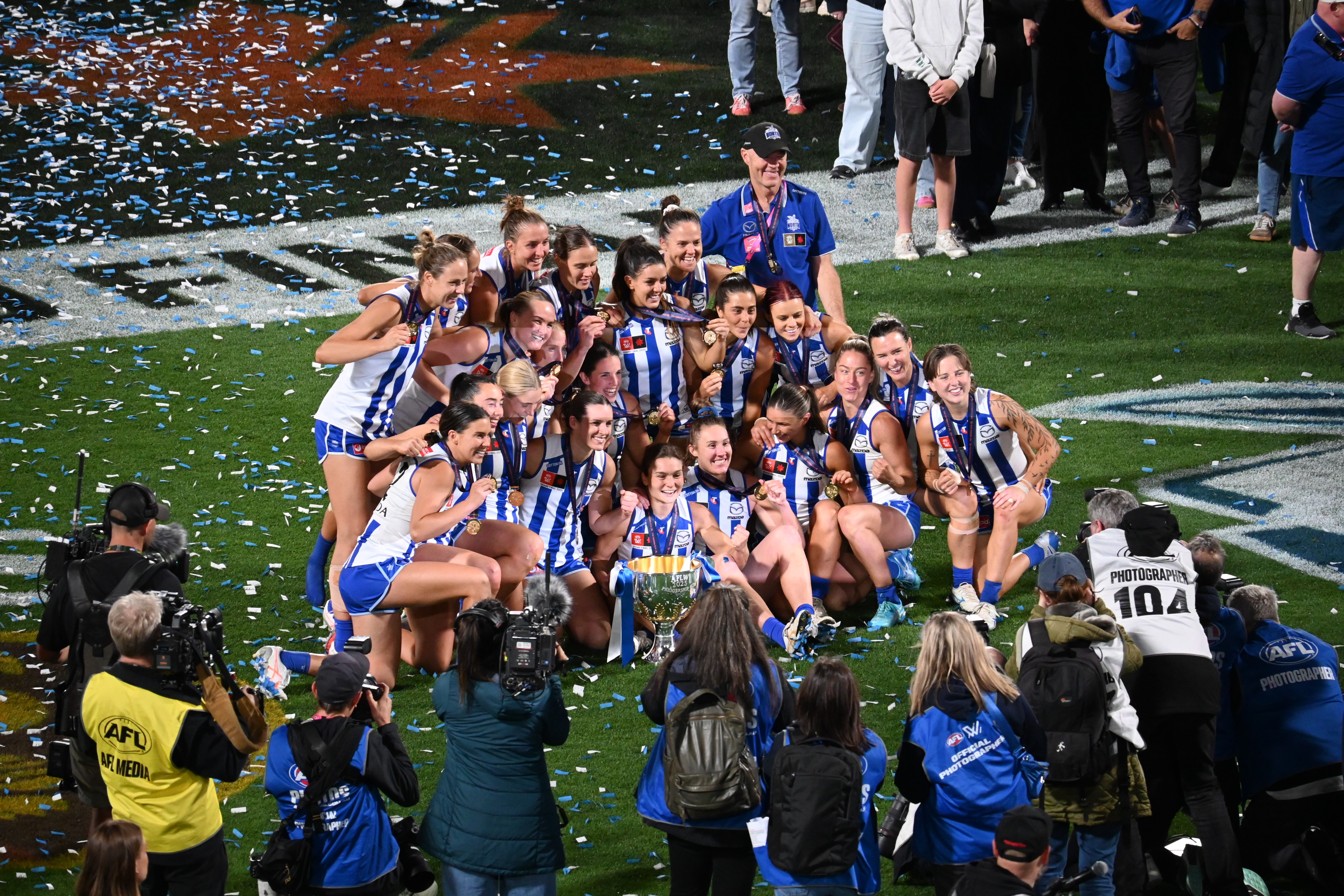

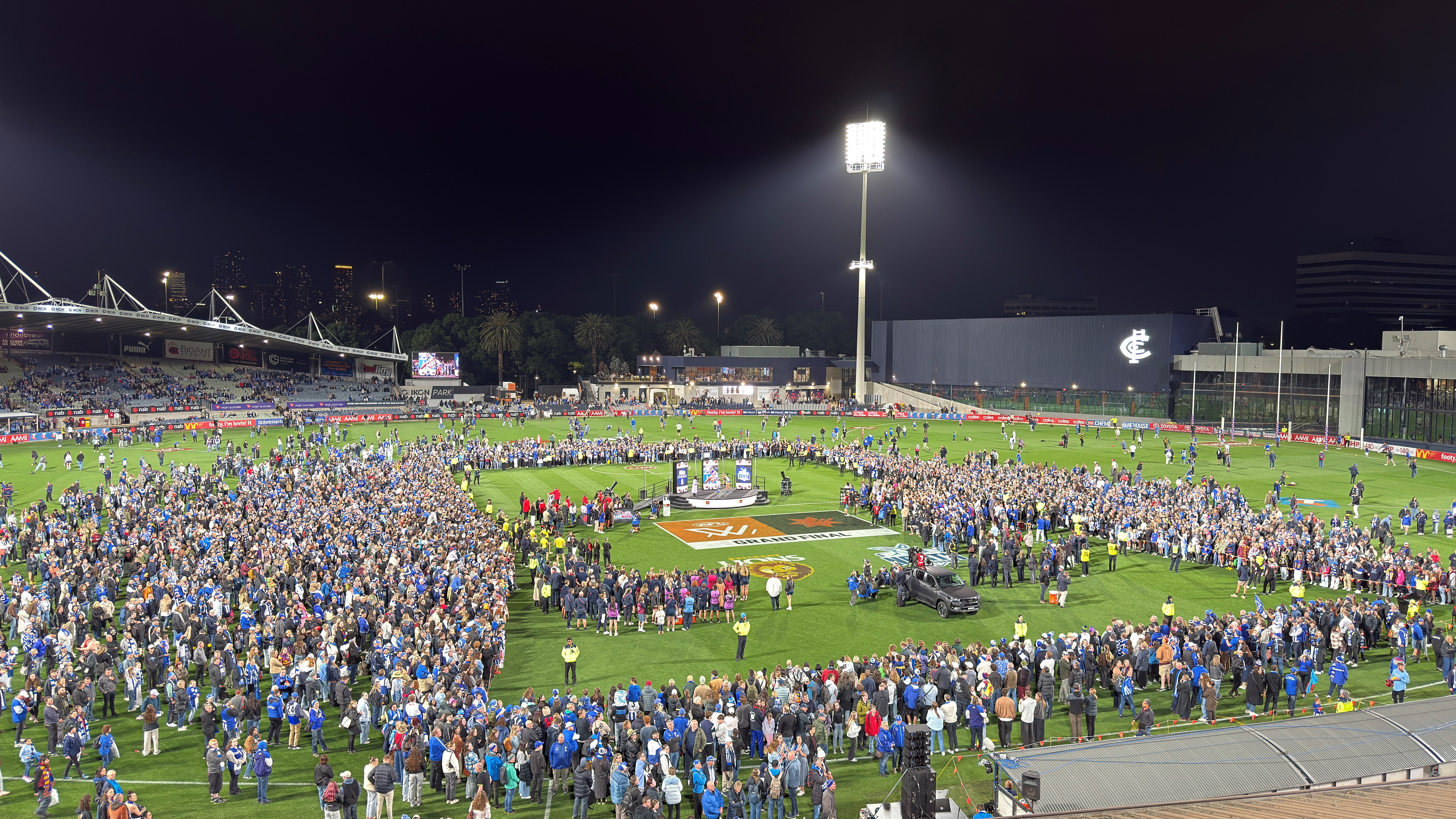
Fans were invited on to the field to surround the presentation area following the match

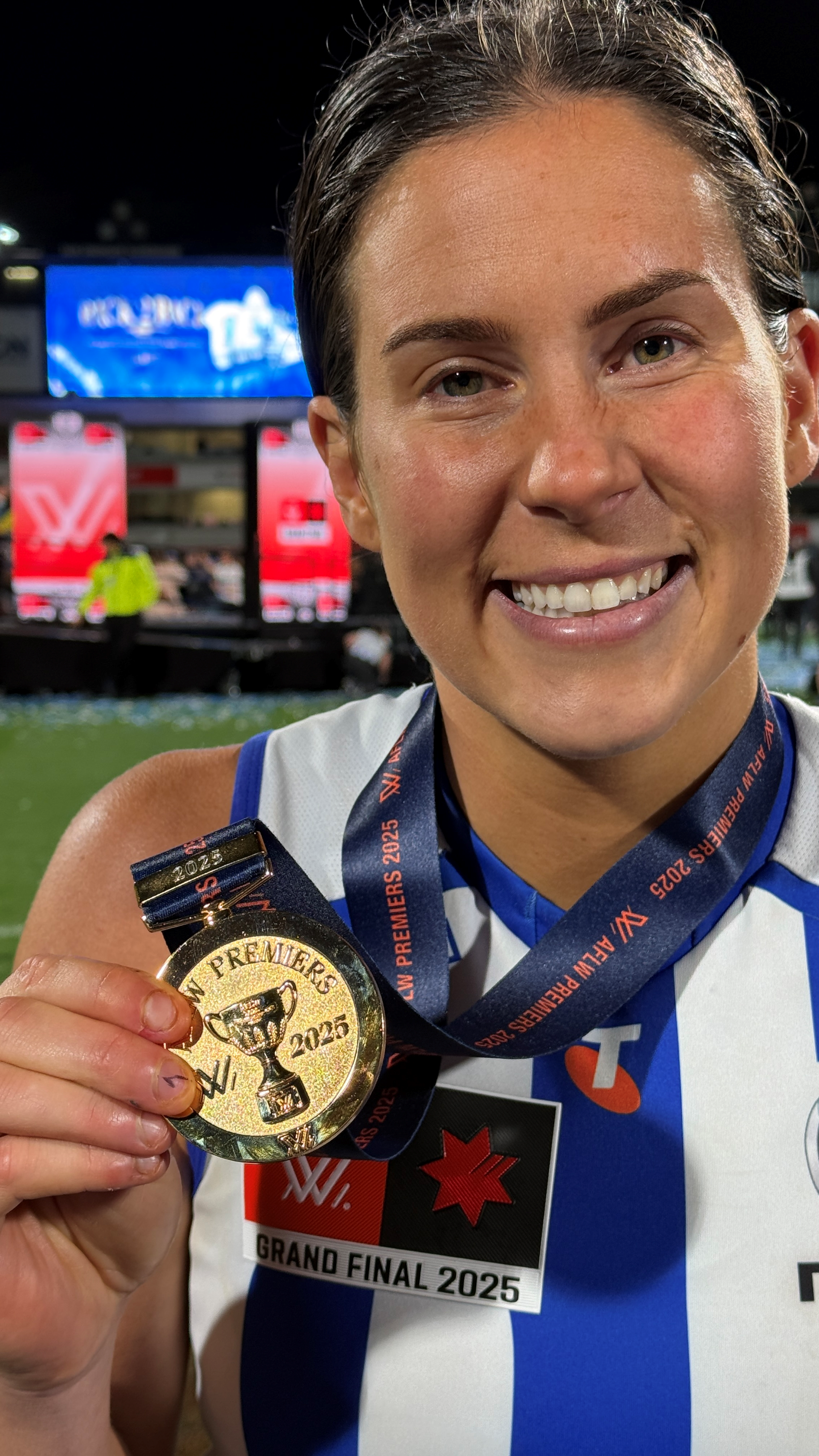
Libby Birch became the first player to win four AFL Women's premiership medals

== Match summary ==
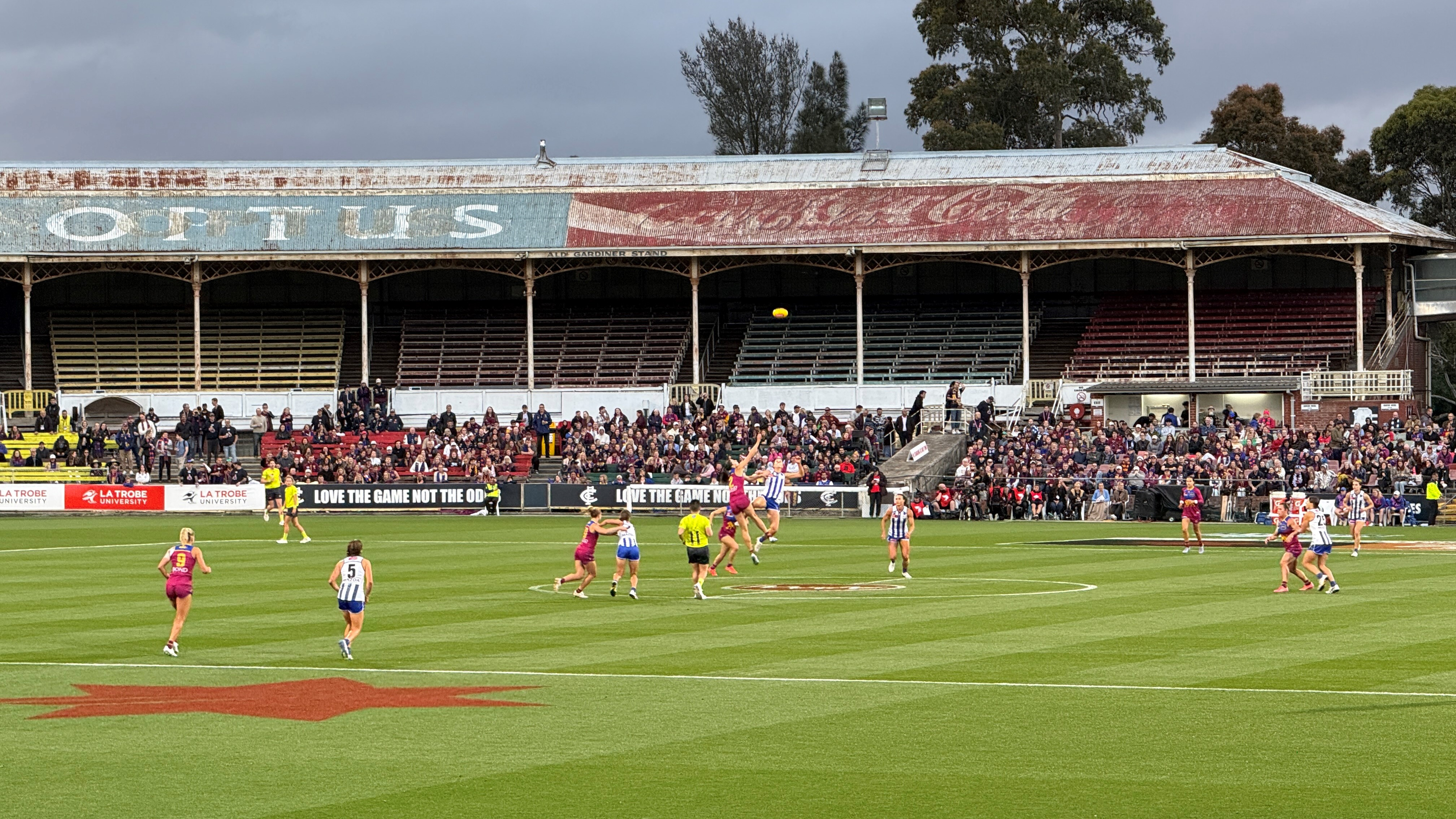
Centre ruck contest during the first quarter

Brisbane got off to a flying start when Brisbane's Charlotte Mullins tackled North Melbourne's Jasmine Ferguson, who was penalised for holding the ball. Mullins converted from a 40-metre set shot. North Melbourne soon responded with a goal from Eilish Sheerin; this was controversial, as North Melbourne's Tahlia Randall had dropped the ball and should have been penalised. A second goal followed shortly before quarter time after North Melbourne ruck Emma King took a spectacular grab and then delivered the ball to Bella Eddey 25 metres out but on a tight angle. Eddey made the shot, giving North Melbourne the lead at quarter time, 2.0 (12) to Brisbane's 1.1 (7).

In the second quarter, Brisbane defender Shannon Campbell pushed North Melbourne' Kate Shierlaw on the ground after Shierlaw had taken a mark, resulting in a 50-metre penalty. Campbell then compounded her error by not exiting the zone as Shierlaw ran ahead, resulting in a second 50-metre penalty. This put Shierlaw well within range for an easy goal. A few minutes later, North Melbourne's Jasmine Garner took an intercept mark when Brisbane tried to move the ball out of defence, and delivered the ball to Jenna Bruton, who scored a fourth unanswered goal for her team from long range. A snap shot by Eilish Sheerin soon made it five. At the half time break, North Melbourne had extended its lead to 6.0 (12) to Brisbane's 1.2 (8). Sheerin had racked up 15 disposals and two goals.

The third quarter opened with Talia Randall extended the lead with a strong mark and another goal. Brisbane finally scored one back, with Ruby Svarc crumbing a chaos ball kicked out the back. This began a strong fight back by Brisbane, led by Isabel Dawes, but North Melbourne's defence, led by Libby Birch, remained well-organised and held firm. At three-quarter time, North Melbourne led by 22 points, 6.0 (36) to Brisbane's 2.2 (14). The final quarter opened with Jasmine garner kicking another one from an intercept mark. Jenna Bruton was pushed over by Brisbane's Ellie Hampson, resulting in a fourth 50-metre penalty being awarded against Brisbane and a second goal to Bruton. With a few minutes left to go, she was awarded a free kick and made it three. Her teammate Ash Riddell also played a great game, finishing with 39 disposals (a record for an AFLW Grand Final), 20 contested possessions and six clearances.

Libby Birch became the first AFLW player to rack up four premierships, having previously won with the Western Bulldogs in 2018, Melbourne in 2022 and North Melbourne in 2024. It was a third premiership win for teammates Emma Kearney, Jenna Bruton and Kim Rennie, and the first for Blaithin Bogue, Eliza Shannon and Best on Ground Eilish Sheerin.

== Best on ground medal ==
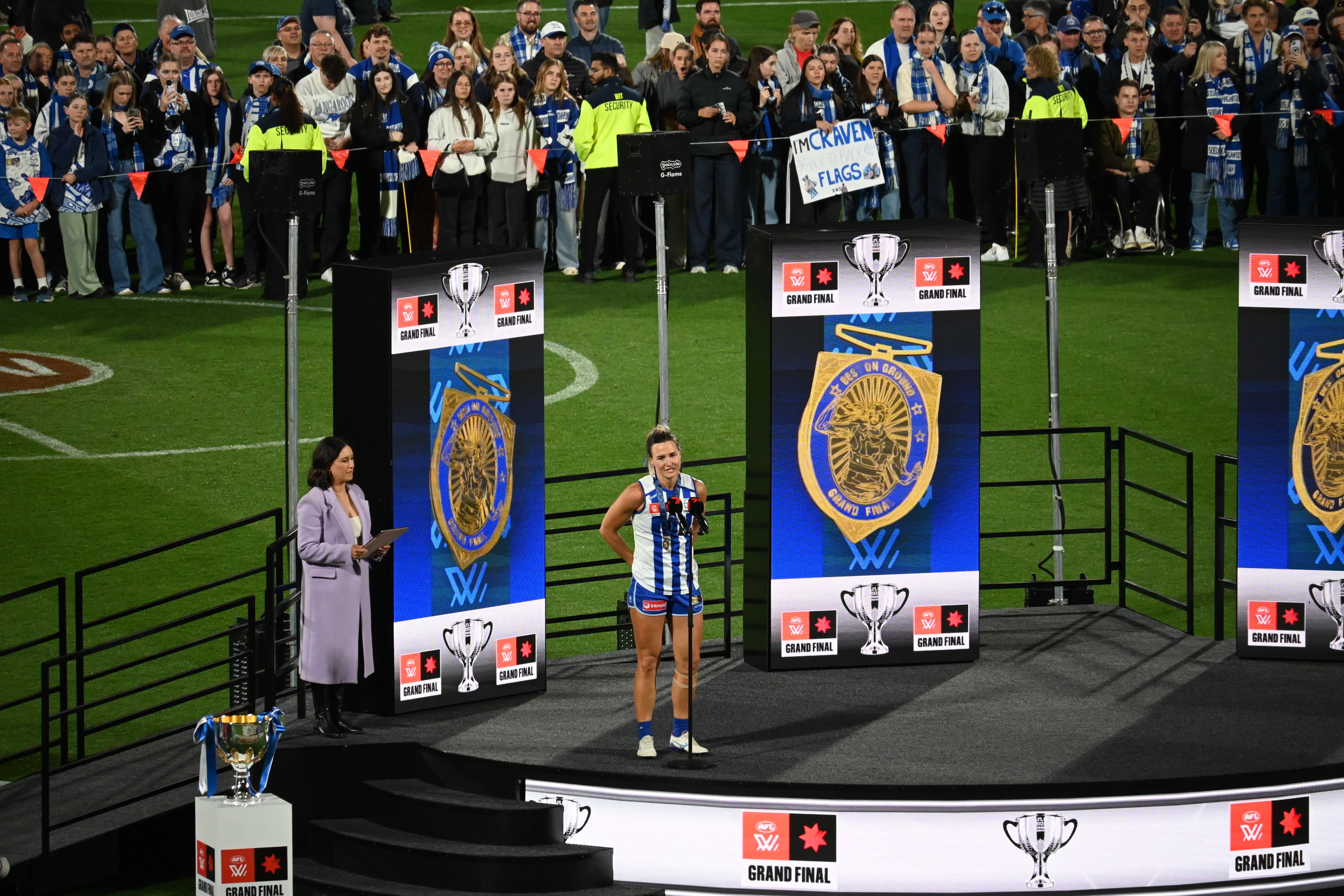
Eilish Sheerin (North Melbourne) on stage accepting the best on ground medal

The best on ground medal was presented by AFL Commissioner Simone Wilkie AO. The voting panel consisted of Abbey Holmes (chair, Seven), Gemma Bastiani (AFL Media, ABC Sport), Laura Spurway (3AW) and Lauren Wood (Herald Sun, Fox Footy). North Melbourne's Eilish Sheerin was unanimously judged best afield with a maximum 12 votes after 28 disposals, 8 tackles, 9 clearances and 2 goals.

=== Voting ===
Best on Ground Medal voting panel
Voter	3 Votes	2 Votes	1 Vote
Abbey Holmes (Chair, Channel 7)	Eilish Sheerin	Ash Riddell	Belle Dawes
Gemma Bastiani (AFL Media, ABC)	Eilish Sheerin	Jasmine Garner	Ash Riddell
Laura Spurway (3AW)	Eilish Sheerin	Ash Riddell	Jasmine Garner
Lauren Wood (Herald Sun, Fox Footy)	Eilish Sheerin	Jasmine Garner	Ash Riddell

Leaderboard
Player	Team	Votes	Total
Eilish Sheerin	North Melbourne	3, 3, 3, 3	12
Ash Riddell	North Melbourne	2, 2, 1, 1	6
Jasmine Garner	North Melbourne	2, 2, 1	5
Belle Dawes	Brisbane	1	1

== Media coverage ==
=== Television ===
Seven's coverage, simulcast on streaming service 7+, began at 7 pm AEDT. Abbey Holmes hosted the broadcast from the ground, with analysis from Kate McCarthy and Erin Phillips. The match was commentated by Alister Nicholson, Jo Wotton, Kate McCarthy and Erin Phillips.

Fox Footy's coverage, also shown on streaming services Kayo Sports and BINGE, began at 6:30 pm AEDT. Kelli Underwood hosted the broadcast from Fox Footy's Studios in Southbank, with analysis coming from former Carlton AFLW coach Daniel Harford and Collingwood AFLW captain Ruby Schleicher. Fox Footy host and Herald Sun journalist Lauren Wood provided interviews and updates from Ikon Park during the broadcast. Fox Footy simulcasted the Seven Network coverage of the match with Seven's commentators and graphics, being accompanied by their own out-of-play analysis.

=== Radio ===
Radio broadcasters
Station	Region	Callers	Special Comments	Boundary Riders
Triple M	National	Tim Solly, Jess Webster	Sarah Hosking, Ethan Meldrum (statistician)	Hannah Davies
ABC Radio	National	Lauren Bordin, Joel Peterson	Chyloe Kurdas, Gemma Bastiani	Poppy Penny
AFL Nation (Note: The AFL Nation coverage was heard on SEN1116 in Melbourne and on SEN stations nationally.)	National	Matthew Cocks	Tarni White	N/A
NIRS	National	Barry Denner, Ron Rogers	Chris Egan, Kaitlyn Ashmore	Megan Waters
3AW (Note: 3AW's coverage was heard on 4BC in Brisbane, 6PR in Perth and FiveAA in Adelaide.)	Melbourne, VIC	Matt Granland, Shane McInnes	Meg McDonald, Sarah Burt	Emilia Fuller

=== International ===
International broadcasters
Country	Channel	FTA/Pay/Stream	Live/Delay
Asia-Pacific	ABC Australia	FTA	Live
East Asia	Premier Sports	Pay	Live
New Zealand	Sky Sport 2	Pay	Live
Pacific Islands	PacificAus TV	FTA	Live
Africa	ESPN	Pay	Live
United Kingdom	TNT Sports 4 discovery+	Pay; Stream	Live
Ireland	TG4; TG4 Channel 2	FTA; Online	Delayed; Live
United States	Fox Sports 2 Fox One	Pay; Stream	Live
Canada	TSN2	Pay	Live

== See also ==
- 2025 AFL Grand Final
