= 2023 AFL Women's Grand Final =

2023 Australian football match

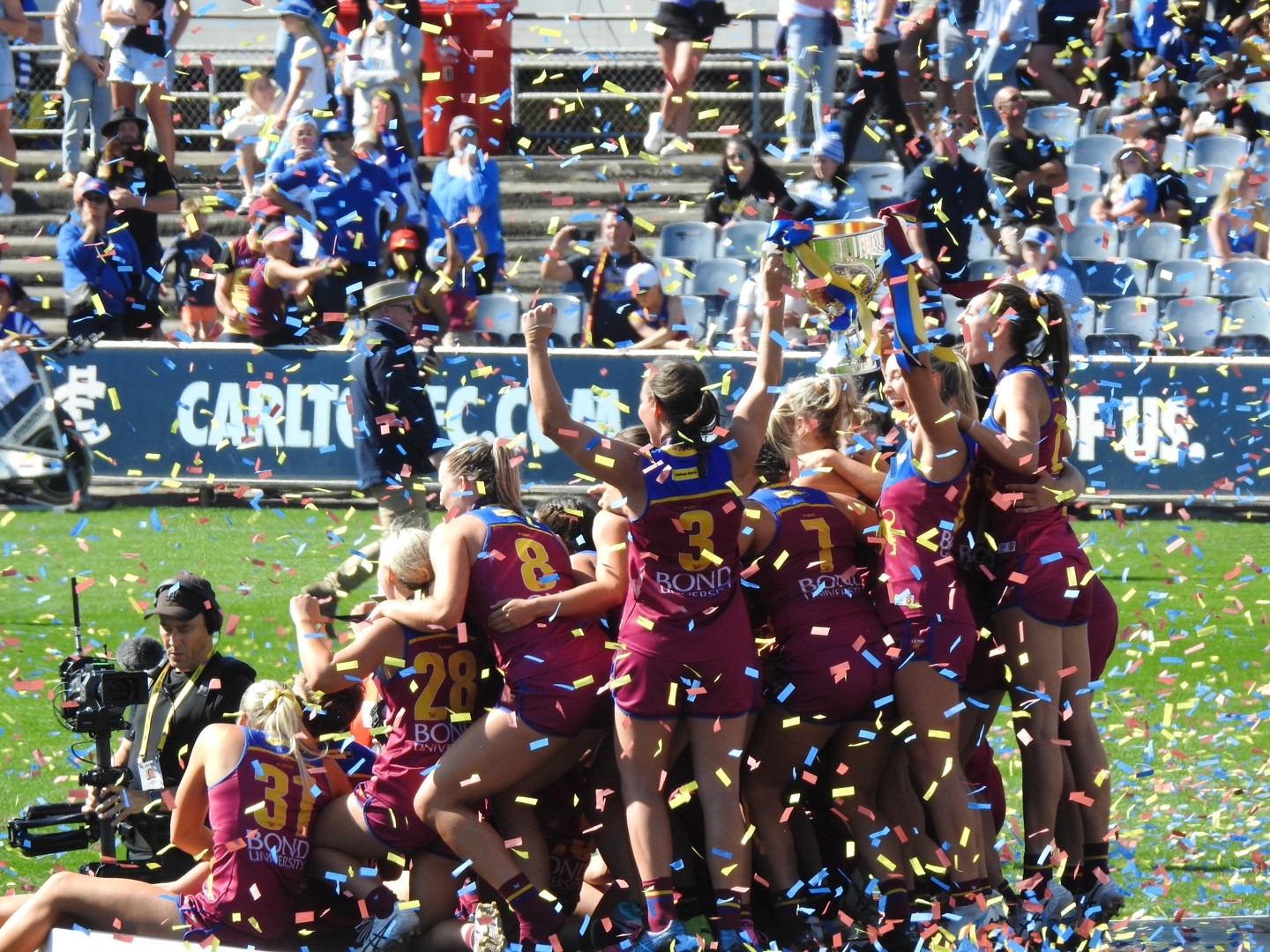

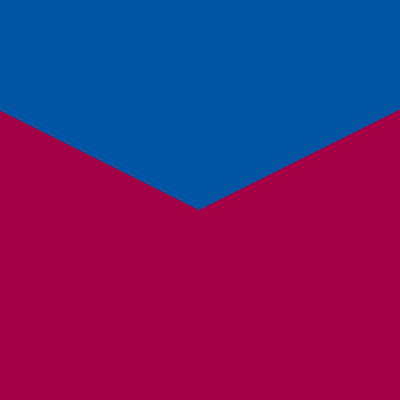
North Melbourne	Brisbane
4.3 (27)	7.2 (44)
	1	2	3	4
NM	1.0 (6)	2.2 (14)	4.3 (27)	4.3 (27)
BL	0.0 (0)	2.1 (13)	3.2 (20)	7.2 (44)
- Date: 3 December 2023
- Stadium: Ikon Park
- Attendance: 12,616
- Umpires: Joel Clamp, Matt Adams, Samuel Nippress
- Coin toss won by: Brisbane

Ceremonies
- National anthem: Vera Blue

Broadcast in Australia
- Network: Seven Network
- Commentators: Jason Bennett, Jo Wotton, Abbey Holmes, Kate McCarthy, Mel Hickey, Nat Edwards

The 2023 AFL Women's Grand Final was an Australian rules football match held on the 3 December at Ikon Park to determine the premiers of the eighth season of the AFL Women's (AFLW) competition. The match was between North Melbourne and Brisbane and was won by Brisbane; it was the club's second senior women's premiership. Brisbane's captain, Breanna Koenen, was awarded the best-on-ground medal.

== Background ==
One of the original sides in the AFL Women's competition, and initially the only one based in Queensland, Brisbane had taken advantage of a well-organised and successful development program for women AFL players in that state, and had chalked up five AFLW grand final appearances, winning the flag in 2021. But as the competition expanded from eight teams to eighteen, it had become a source of players for new teams, eventually providing enough to form an entire team.

In the 2023 season, the Lions had to contend with the loss of key players Emily Bates, Greta Bodey and Jesse Wardlaw, who departed for other clubs, and Kate Lutkins, who was pregnant. Wardlaw's departure put additional pressure on Dakota Davidson, who now became the primary target up forward, and Belle Dawes was called upon to replace Bates in the midfield.

After losing to Melbourne in the 2022 Grand Final, the team embarked on an intense pre-season training regime that included a 20-kilometre trail hike carrying 14 full metal jerry cans between them. At key moments in the finals series, a jerry can was displayed to remind the players of what they had been through, and to spur them to greater effort. During the 2023 regular season, Brisbane suffered defeats at the hands of Richmond, Collingwood and St Kilda, none of which ultimately made the finals, but chalked up wins against the other top-four sides, Adelaide, North Melbourne and Melbourne, to finish fourth on the ladder. The Lions defeated Adelaide by two points to earn a home Preliminary Final, and then Geelong by four to secure a berth in the Grand Final.

North Melbourne made its AFLW debut in 2019, building up its team by aggressively recruiting players. Before 2023 the club had never played in an AFL Women's grand final (or, for that matter, a men's one since 1999). Although it posted several good wins in the 2023 season, it lost its matches against the other top-four contenders, Brisbane, Adelaide and Melbourne. In the finals though, it inflicted a stunning defeat on Melbourne in the Qualifying Final and then beat minor premiers Adelaide by a point in the Preliminary Final.

== Venue and date ==
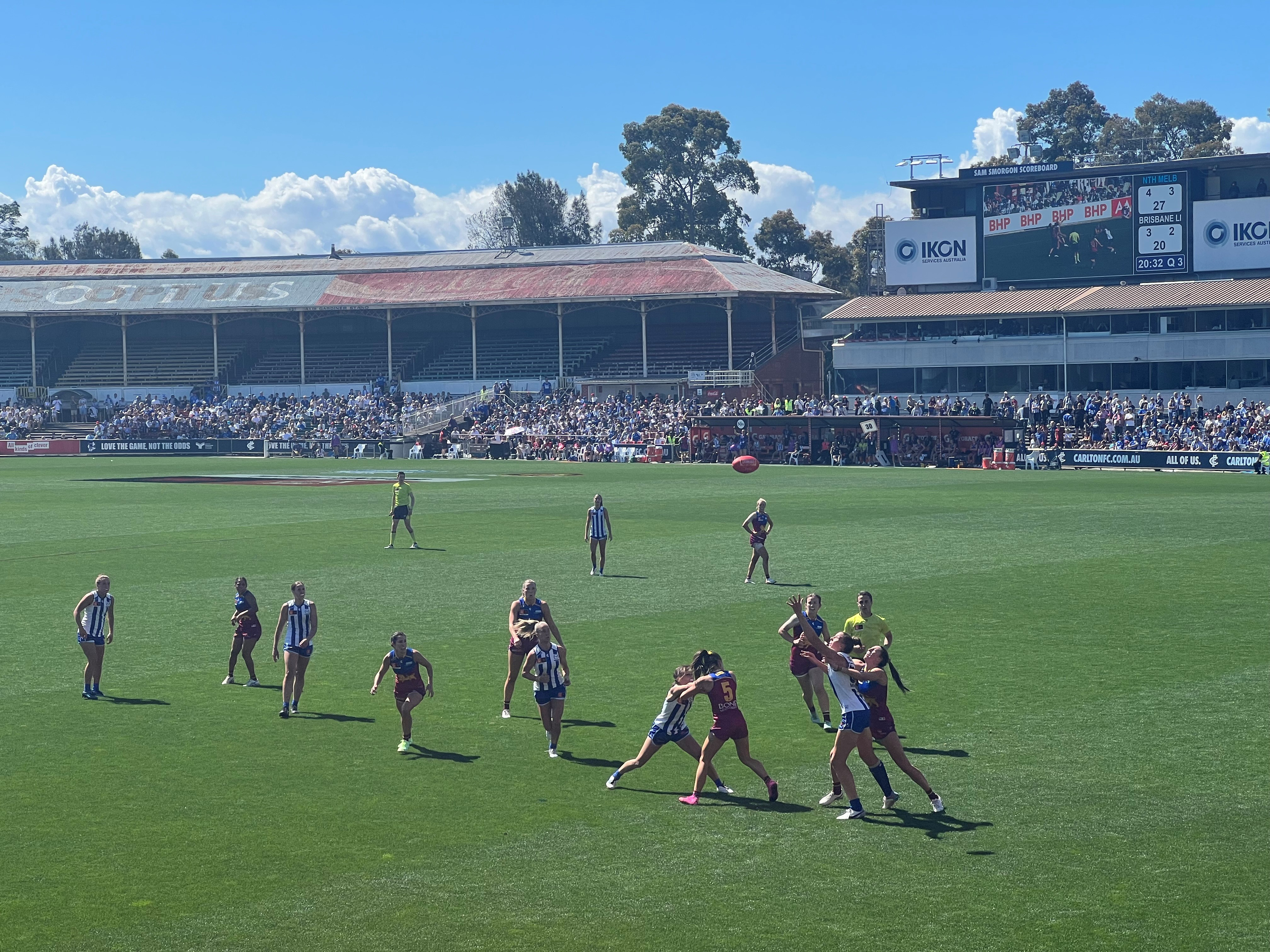
Ikon Park during the match

By virtue of North Melbourne defeating Adelaide in the Preliminary Final, the Grand Final was held at North Melbourne's home ground, Ikon Park, on 3 December 2023. It was the first time that the AFLW Grand Final had been held Melbourne since 2018. The venue had once had a capacity in excess of 20,000 but due to recent works this had been reduced to just 13,000. All 13,000 tickets were sold out on the day they went on sale. Fans were disappointed that the larger Docklands Stadium could not be used, but the AFL said that the turf at Docklands was unsuitable due to the venue hosting other major events in recent weeks. The match was played in front of a crowd of 12,616 spectators.

== Broadcast and entertainment ==
The match was broadcast live in Australia on the Seven Network and Fox Footy. The match was also available via streaming platforms 7plus, Kayo Sports, and the AFL and AFLW apps.

The 7 broadcast was anchored by Nat Edwards, with the match called by Jason Bennett and Jo Wotton, special comments from 2017 Premiership player Abbey Holmes, 2017 All-Australian Kate McCarthy and former Geelong captain, 7-time VFLW Premiership player and 2017 All-Australian Mel Hickey. Edwards provided updates from the boundary.

Fox Footy's broadcast was hosted by Kelli Underwood, with special inputs from former Bulldogs captain, 2018 Premiership player and 3-time All-Australian Ellie Blackburn, 2-time All-Australian Ruby Schleicher and Carlton coach Daniel Harford, with Fox commentator Jess Webster providing updates and interviews from Ikon Park.

2023 AFLW Grand Final - Radio Commentators
Network	Distribution	Play-by-play commentators	Special comments	Boundary rider
ABC Radio	National	Quentin Hull Lauren Bordin	Chyloe Kurdas Meg Hutchins	Lucy Watkin
Triple M	National	Barry Denner Tim Solly	Kirsty Lamb Ethan Meldrum (statistician)	Michael Roberts
AFL Nation SEN1116	National Melbourne, VIC	Matthew Cocks	Jordyn Allen	N/A
3AW 4BC 6PR FiveAA	Melbourne, VIC Brisbane, QLD Perth, WA Adelaide, SA	Matt Granland Bruce Eva	Matt Skubis Damien Keeping	Emilia Fuller

=== Entertainment ===
ARIA Award-winning singer-songwriter G Flip was designated to perform in the pre-game entertainment. G Flip had previously provided the pre-game entertainment for the 2021 AFLW Grand Final and the half-time entertainment for the 2022 AFL Grand Final. They were joined by former Brisbane Lions players Sabrina Frederick and Jesse Wardlaw, who now play for Collingwood and St Kilda respectively, on drums for their song Rough. Uncle Colin Hunter Jr gave the Welcome to Country and Vera Blue sang the national anthem.

== Teams ==
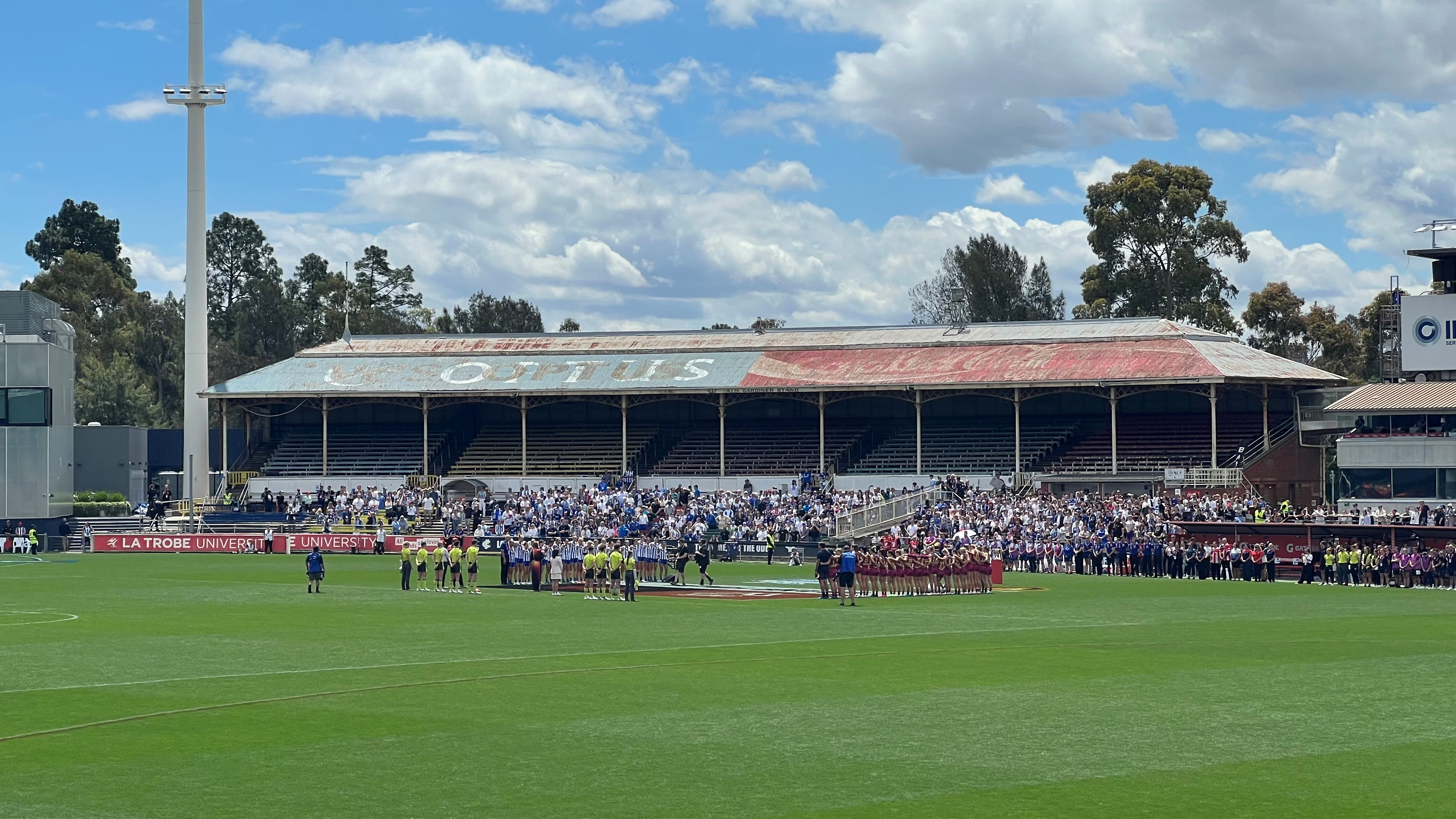
Teams line up for the Australian national anthem

Both sides announced unchanged teams from the preliminary finals despite injury concerns around Brisbane's centre half-forward, Dakota Davidson, who suffered a knee injury in the preliminary final. She was cleared to play after scans indicated there was no serious ligament damage, but her leg was heavily strapped. The Grand Final was the 75th game for Brisbane's Shannon Campbell, who, together with team captain Breanna Koenen and Ally Anderson, played in all four of Brisbane's AFLW Grand Final appearances. It was also the 50th game for ruck Tahlia Hickie and wing Jade Ellenger. North Melbourne's Emma Kearney, Jenna Bruton and Kim Rennie had won a premiership with the Western Bulldogs in the 2018. Tahlia Randall, who was now their North Melbourne team mate, had also played in that match, but for Brisbane.

North Melbourne Kangaroos
B:	17 Sarah Wright	20 Jasmine Ferguson	
HB:	11 Eliza Shannon	9 Emma Kearney (c)	14 Erika O'Shea
C:	8 Taylah Gatt	23 Mia King	24 Lulu Pullar
HF:	3 Bella Eddey	35 Jenna Bruton	6 Alice O'Loughlin
F:	33 Kate Shierlaw	16 Tahlia Randall	
Foll:	60 Emma King	25 Jasmine Garner	7 Ash Riddell
Int:	12 Nicole Bresnehan	5 Tess Craven	15 Amy Smith
Int:	26 Kim Rennie	28 Niamh Martin	
Coach:	Darren Crocker		
Emg:	1 Liz McGrath	22 Ellie Gavalas	29 Lucy Burke

Brisbane Lions
B:	15 Poppy Boltz	8 Jennifer Dunne	
HB:	3 Breanna Koenen (c)	10 Nat Grider	20 Shannon Campbell
C:	9 Orla O'Dwyer	17 Belle Dawes	5 Jade Ellenger
HF:	6 Lily Postlethwaite	14 Dakota Davidson	12 Sophie Conway
F:	21 Courtney Hodder	31 Taylor Smith	
Foll:	2 Tahlia Hickie	25 Cathy Svarc	18 Ally Anderson
Int:	11 Phoebe Monahan	7 Ellie Hampson	29 Ruby Svarc
Int:	28 Charlotte Mullins	27 Mikayla Pauga	
Coach:	Craig Starcevich		
Emg:	4 Caitlin Wendland	16 Bella Smith	33 Analea McKee

=== Umpires ===
AFL Women's 2023 Grand Final umpires
Position	Umpires
Field umpires	Joel Clamp, Matt Adams, Samuel Nippress
Boundary umpires	Adrian Pretorius, Jaco Jansen van Rensburg, Dominic Schiliro, Greta Miller
Goal umpires	Emilie Hill, Georgia Henderson

With Georgia Henderson and Emilie Hill as goal umpires and Greta Miller as a boundary umpire, this was the first time that more than two women officiated at a Grand Final. Hill, Joel Clamp and Adrian Pretorius had all been named as All-Australian umpires in their positions, and Miller was one of only three umpires to have officiated at more than 50 AFLW games.

== Scoreboard ==
Grand Final
Sunday, 3 December (2:30 pm) (AEDT UTC+11)	North Melbourne	def. by	Brisbane	Ikon Park (crowd: 12,616)	Report
1.0 (6); 2.2 (14); 4.3 (27); 4.3 (27)	Q1; Q2; Q3; Final	0.0 (0); 2.1 (13); 3.2 (20); 7.2 (44)	Umpires: Clamp, Adams, Nippress; Best on ground: Bre Koenen; Television broadcast: Seven Network, Fox Footy; National anthem: Vera Blue
Garner (2), Shierlaw, O'Loughlin	Goals	Davidson (2), Hampson (2), Mullins, O'Dwyer, Koenen
Bruton (ankle)	Injuries

== Match summary ==
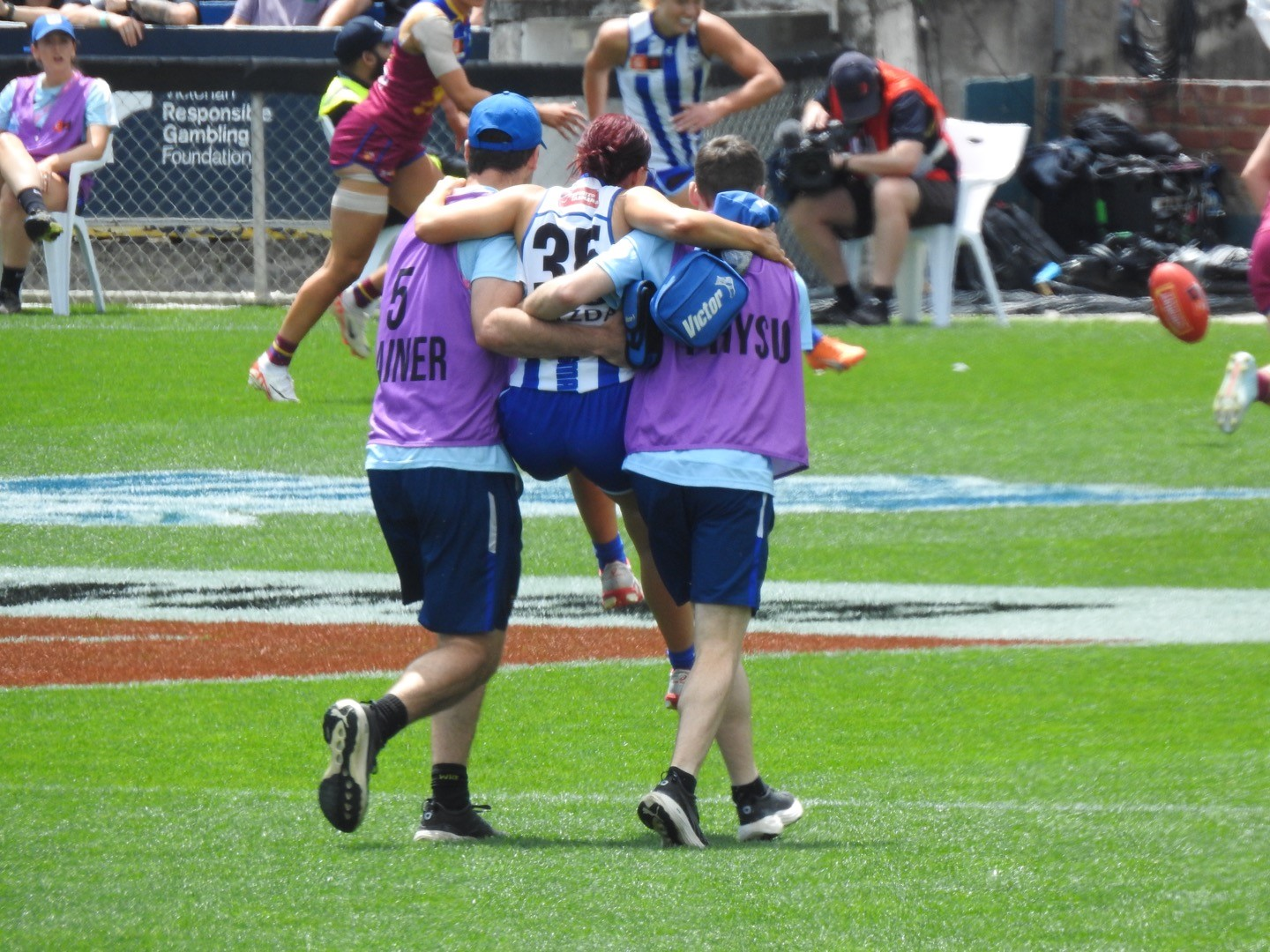
Jenna Bruton (North Melbourne) was assisted from the field during the first quarter

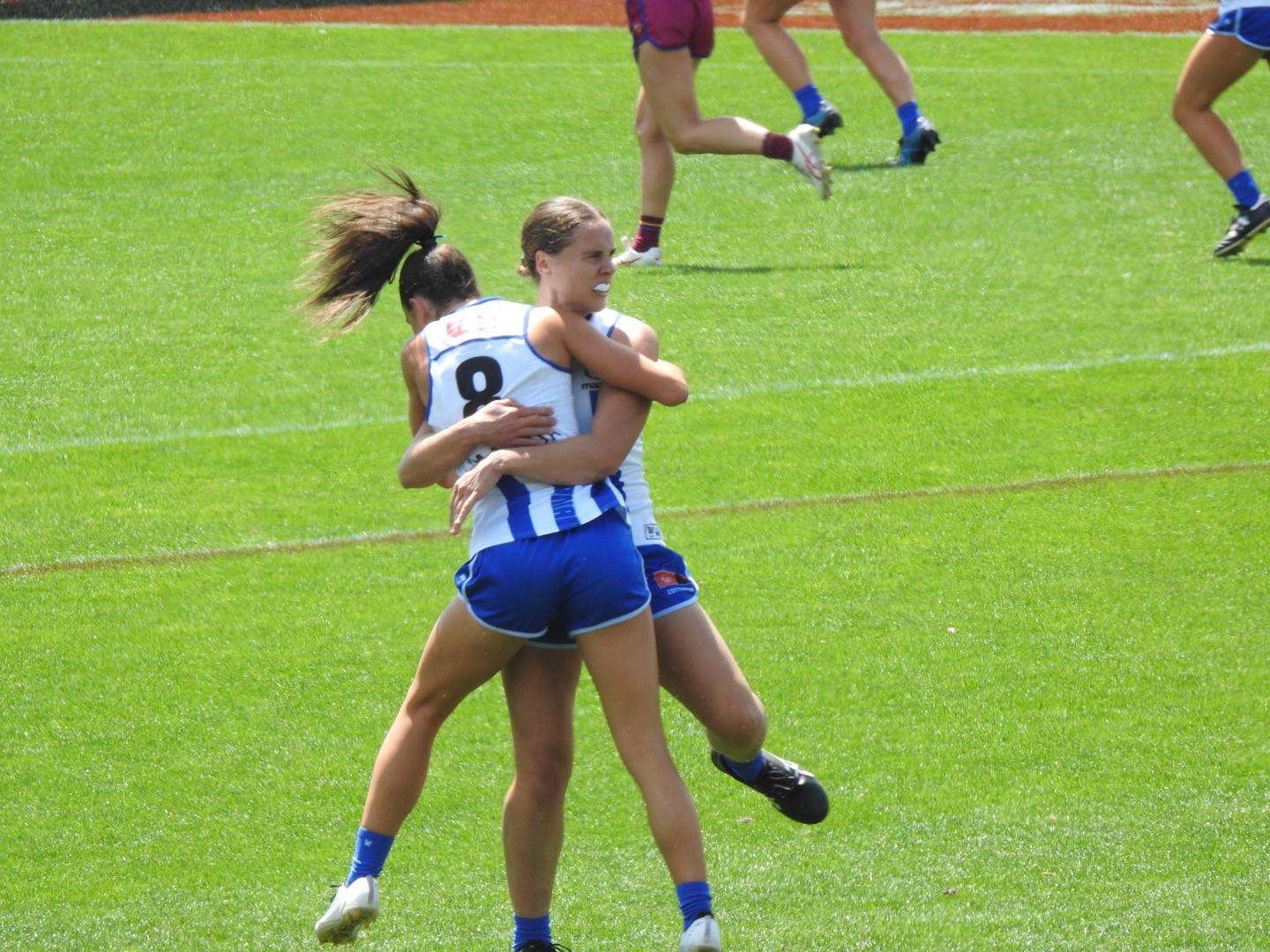
Jasmine Garner and Taylah Gatt (with back to camera) celebrate Garner scoring the opening goal

Brisbane won the coin toss to decide direction the teams would kick. After a minute of play, North Melbourne's Jenna Bruton was carried from the field with an ankle injury and took no further part in the game. By three-quarter time she was on crutches and wearing a moon boot. This was a major blow, as Bruton had been a key figure in the preliminary final win against Adelaide, and it limited North Melbourne's rotations against one of the fittest teams in the competition. The game remained fierce but scoreless until, with less than two minutes to go in the first quarter, North Melbourne's Jasmine Garner, who had scored the first ever goal in an AFLW match back in 2017, scored her team's first ever goal in a Grand Final with a long range set shot. North Melbourne therefore took a one-goal lead into quarter time.

Brisbane hit back in the early second quarter when youngster Charlotte Mullins scored an improbable goal from a long range snap shot that managed to get past the North Melbourne defence and bounced across the line. A few minutes later, Garner scored a second goal from a free kick. It took some brilliant work from Brisbane's Ally Anderson to deliver the ball to forward Ellie Hampson, who marked uncontested inside the 50 metre arc and booted a goal. North Melbourne continued winning centre clearances and attacking, but Brisbane's forward line, led by Bre Koenen, stood firm. Belle Dawes led the possession count, with 14. There was relentless pressure, with North Melbourne laying 47 tackles in the first half and Brisbane 46. At the half time break, North Melbourne was just one point in front, kicking 2.2 (14) to Brisbane's 2.1 (13).

North Melbourne scored two behinds early in the third quarter, but it was Brisbane's Orla O'Dwyer who scored the first goal, putting Brisbane in front for the first time. The lead was short lived; North Melbourne's Kate Shierlaw took a spectacular mark in front of goal, which she converted, and then her midfield managed another centre clearance and delivered the ball to Alice O'Loughlin, who kicked North Melbourne's second goal in as many minutes. Brisbane was successful in keeping North Melbourne's key forward Tahlia Randall quiet, but tagger Cathy Svarc had more difficulty with Jasmine Garner, and Bre Koenen was moved into the midfield to contain her. North Melbourne's Mia King was also very active, and finished the game with twelve clearances and 19 touches. North Melbourne took a seven-point lead into the final break.

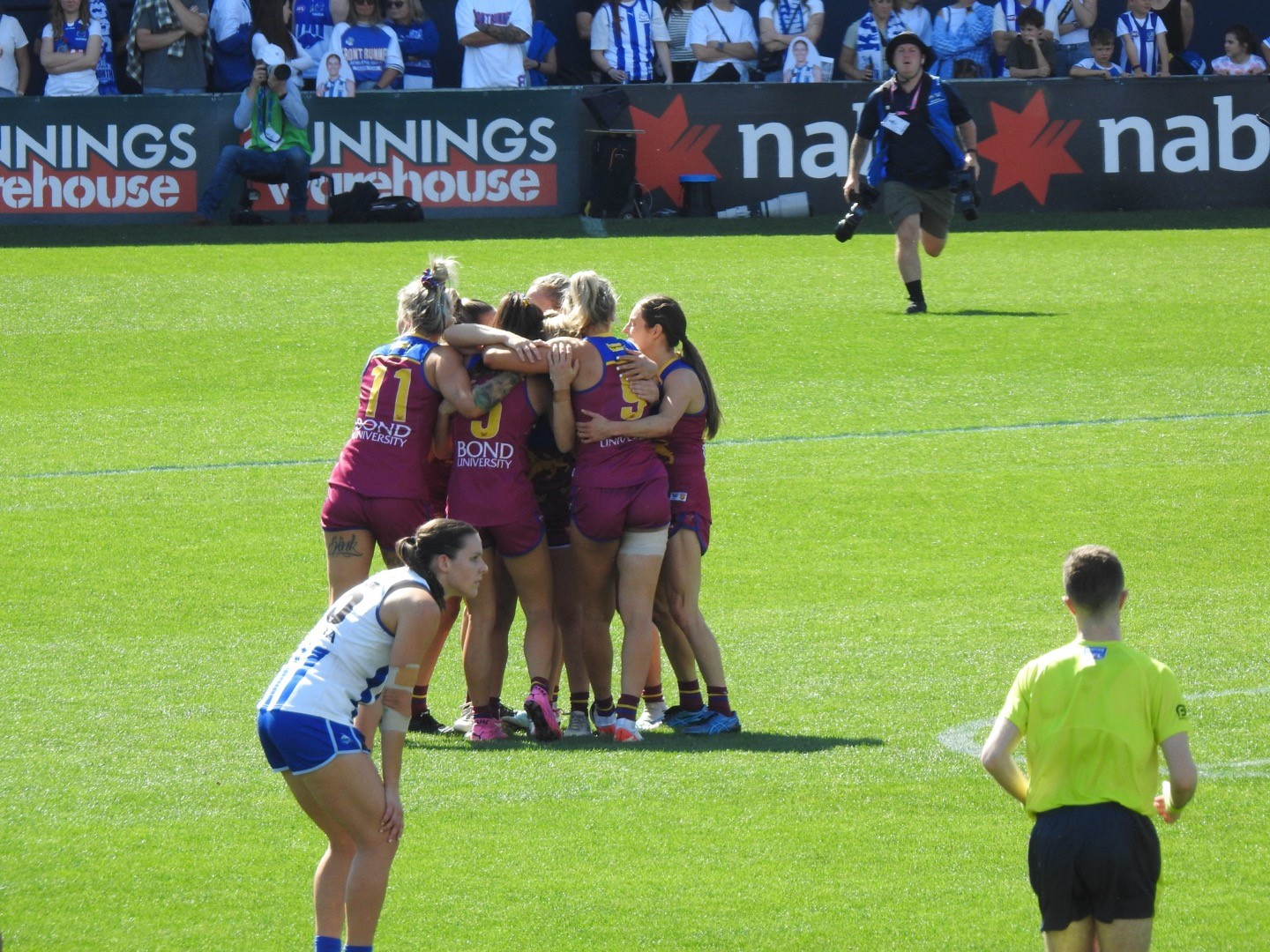
Brisbane Lions players celebrate after the final siren

Brisbane wing Sophie Conway was given a head injury assessment at three-quarter time but returned to the field mid-way through the final quarter. A jerry can was displayed to let the team know that a major effort was now required. Dakota Davidson later recalled that the sight of the jerry can was inspirational. She had been quiet, perhaps due to her knee injury, which clearly had not fully healed, but now managed to soar above a pack and take a strong contested mark. She then scored a goal to peg the margin back to a single point. A few minutes later, she did it again, putting Brisbane back in front. Then Ellie Hampson was awarded a free kick for a hold in the goal square and slotted another goal. North Melbourne's efforts were stymied by ferocious tackling effort, with Brisbane laying on another 64 tackles in the second half to finish with 110 for the match, an AFLW record, and keep North Melbourne scoreless in the final quarter. Belle Dawes finished with 18 contested possessions, 20 touches and 13 tackles, and Ally Anderson had 20 disposals and six clearances. Finally, with four minutes remaining, Bre Koenen, who had been a lion in defence in more ways than one, came forward to kick a goal and put the result beyond doubt. Brisbane claimed its second AFLW premiership, winning by 19 points, 7.2 (44) to 4.3 (27).

== Premiership cup ==
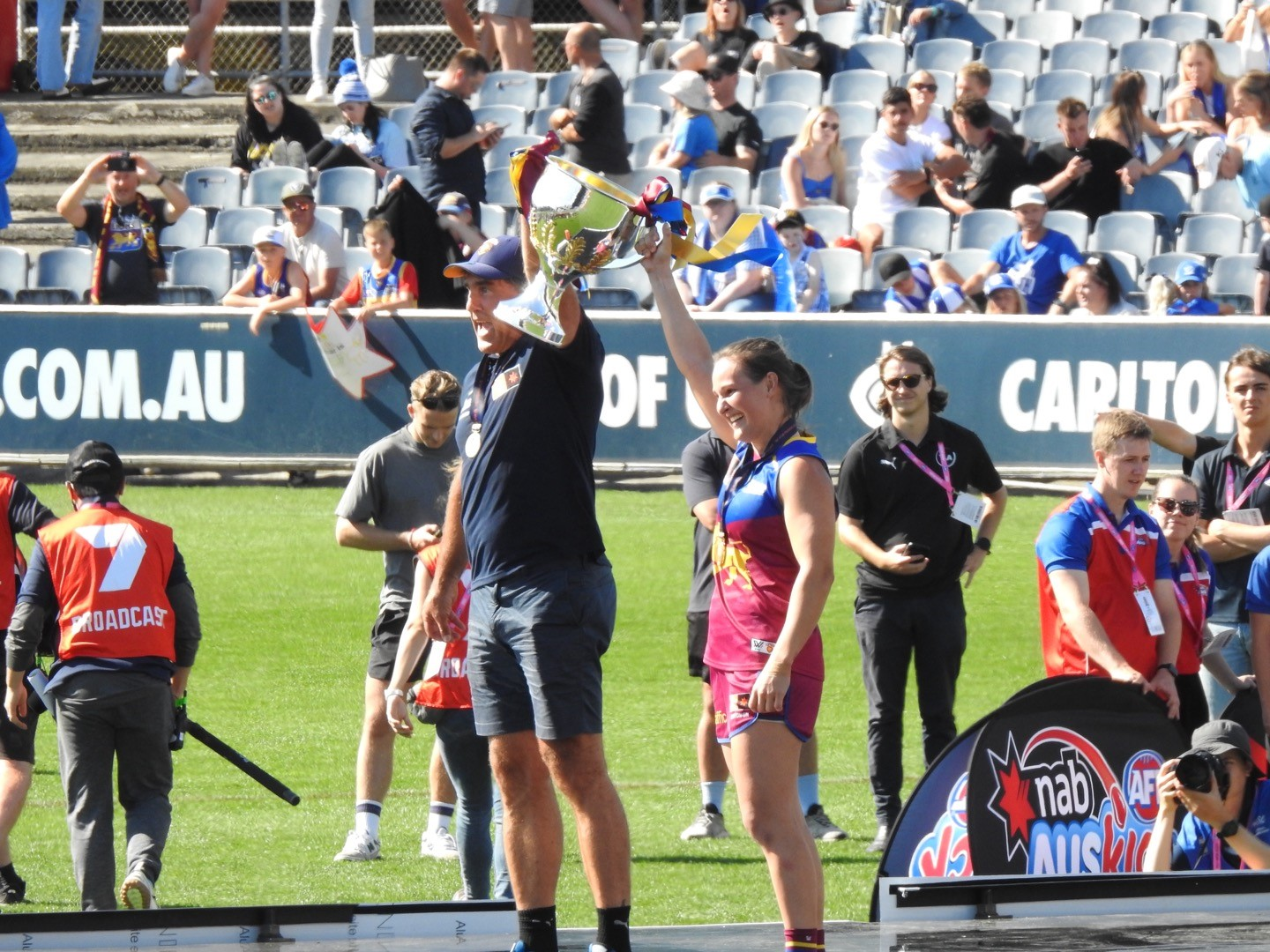
Brisbane Lions captain Breanna Koenen (right) and coach Craig Starcevich (left) with the 2023 AFL Women's premiership cup

It was Koenen's second premiership, and the second for coach Craig Starcevich, who had previously won a men's premiership as a player with Collingwood in 1990. Starcevich, the only coach that the Brisbane women's side had ever known, had coached them for 75 games and had already re-signed with the club for another two years. The premiership cup was handed to Koenen and Starcevich by Brisbane's 2021 AFLW premiership captain, Emma Zielke.

== Best-on-ground medal ==
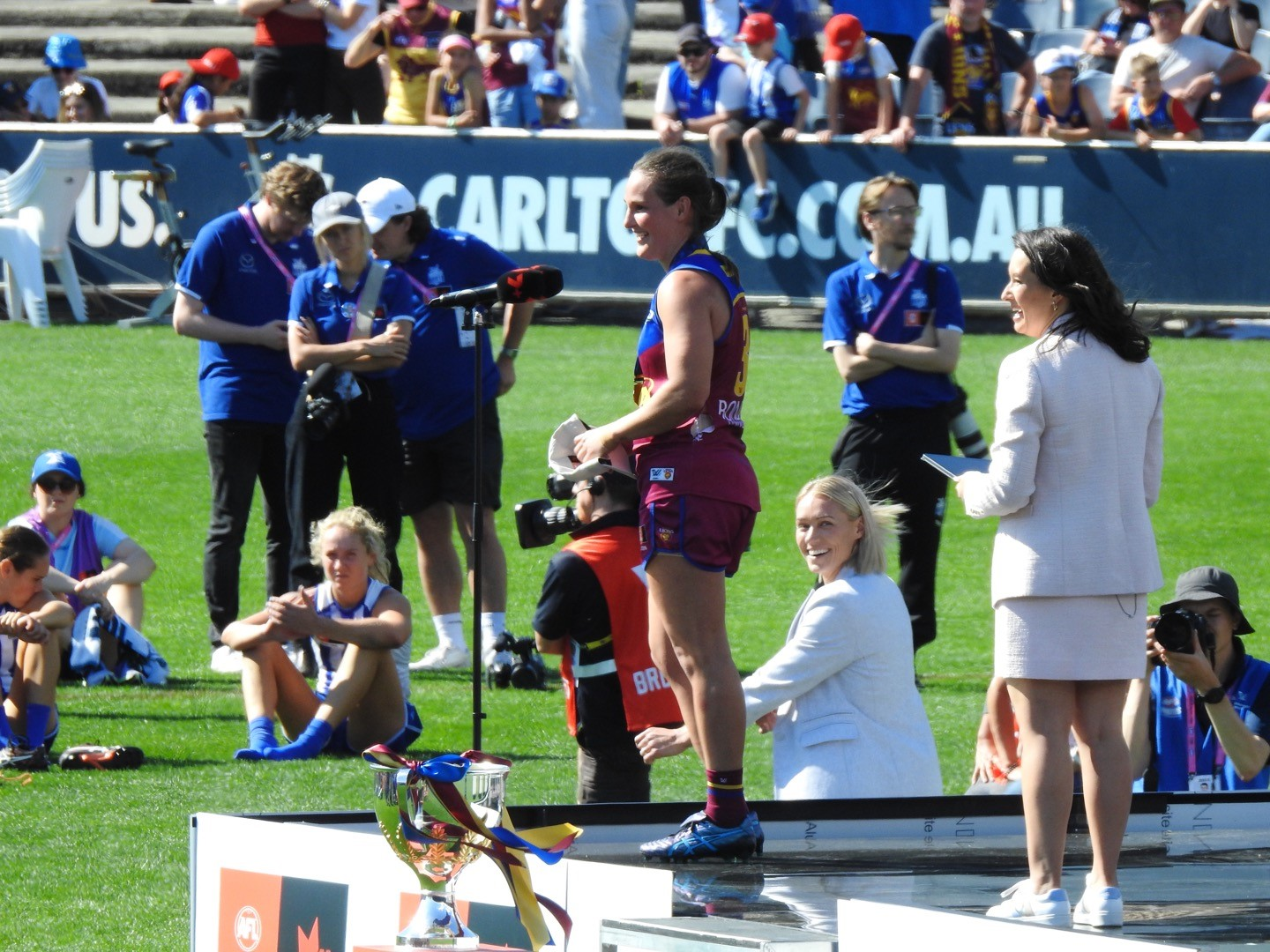
Brisbane Lions captain Breanna Koenen won the 2023 AFLW Grand Final best-on-ground medal

The best-on-ground medal was presented by Erin Phillips, a former Adelaide and Port Adelaide player who had retired at the end of the 2023 season, and herself a dual winner of the medal. Phillips was part of a five-person voting panel chaired by Seven Network commentator and Adelaide premiership player Abbey Holmes and also included AFL.com.au reporter Gemma Bastiani, Herald Sun reporter Lauren Wood and ABC broadcaster Quentin Hull. The medal was awarded to Bre Koenen, who had nineteen disposals, ten tackles, seven marks, and a goal.

=== 2023 Best-on-ground voting ===
Best on Ground Medal Voting Tally
Position	Player	Club	Total votes	Vote summary
1st (winner)	Breanna Koenen	Brisbane Lions	15	3, 3, 3, 3, 3
2nd	Jasmine Garner	North Melbourne	9	2, 2, 2, 2, 1
3rd	Belle Dawes	Brisbane Lions	5	2, 1, 1, 1
4th	Nat Grider	Brisbane Lions	1	1

Best-on-ground votes
Voter	3 Votes	2 Votes	1 Vote
Abbey Holmes (chair) (Seven Network)	Breanna Koenen	Belle Dawes	Jasmine Garner
Erin Phillips	Breanna Koenen	Jasmine Garner	Belle Dawes
Gemma Bastiani (AFL.com.au)	Breanna Koenen	Jasmine Garner	Belle Dawes
Quentin Hull (ABC Sport)	Breanna Koenen	Jasmine Garner	Belle Dawes
Lauren Wood (News Corp Australia)	Breanna Koenen	Jasmine Garner	Natalie Grider
