= Taylah Gatt =

Australian rules footballer (born 2004)

Personal information
- Born: 1 November 2004 (age 22)
- Original teams: Casey (VFLW); Dandenong Stingrays (Talent League Girls)
- Draft: No. 28, 2022 draft
- Debut: Round 1, 2022 (S7), North Melbourne vs. Gold Coast, at Bellerive Oval
- Height: 169 cm (5 ft 7 in)
- Position: Winger

Club information
- Current club: North Melbourne
- Number: 8

Playing career^{1}
| Years | Club | Games (Goals) |
| 2022 (S7)– | North Melbourne | 48 (6) |
- ^{1} Playing statistics correct to the end of 2025.

Career highlights
- 2× AFLW premiership player: 2024, 2025

Taylah Gatt (born 1 November 2004) is a professional Australian rules football player who currently plays for the North Melbourne Football Club in the AFL Women's (AFLW).

== AFL Women's career ==
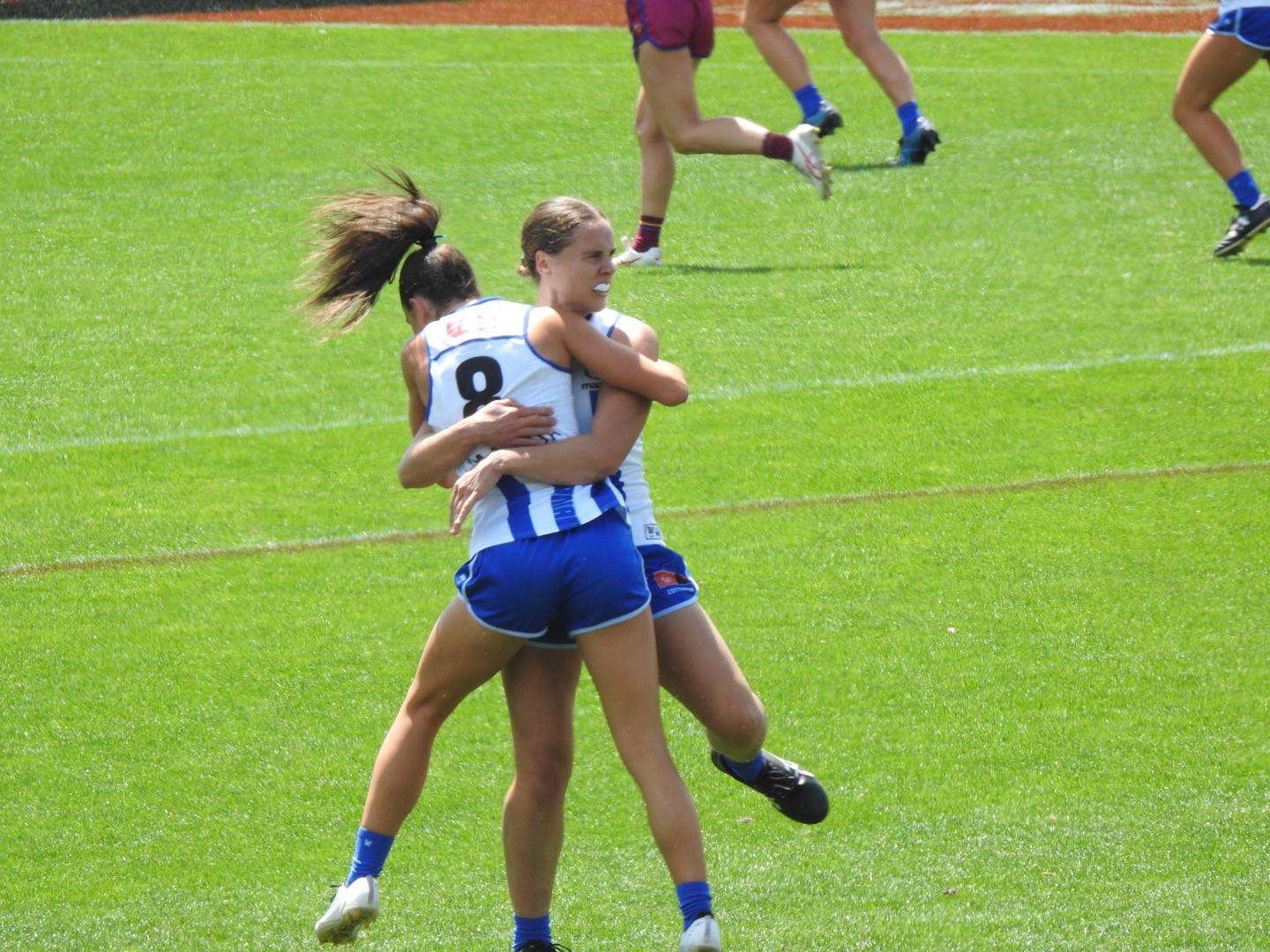
Gatt (front) celebrates a Jasmine Garner goal in the 2023 Grand Final

Gatt was drafted by North Melbourne with the 28th overrall pick in the 2022 draft. She made her debut in round one, 2022 (S7) against Gold Coast, and made 13 appearances in her debut season, all while completing her final year of high school.

She won her first premiership with the Kangaroos when they defeated Brisbane in the 2024 Grand Final, and her second in the following year when North Melbourne completed their premiership defence in the 2025 Grand Final. Her pace outside of the midfield play contributed to each of the premierships.

== Personal life ==
Gatt has a dog-walking business as a side-hustle. She also works and studies part-time.

She grew up supporting Collingwood in the Australian Football League.
