= AFL Women's Grand Final =

Australian rules football match

- Location: Various
- First meeting: 25 March 2017
- Latest meeting: 3 December 2023
- Next meeting: 30 November 2024
- Broadcasters: Seven Network (2017–)
- Stadiums: See below

Statistics
- Total meetings: 7
- Most wins: Adelaide (3)

The AFL Women's Grand Final is an annual women's Australian rules football match to determine the AFL Women's (AFLW) premiers for that year. Each year, the winning club receives a premiership trophy and premiership flag; all players in the winning team receive a premiership medallion.

The record attendance is 53,034, which was set at the 2019 AFL Women's Grand Final.

As of 2025, every AFL Women's Grand Final has featured either (or both of, in the case of 2017 and 2021, for one win each) Adelaide or Brisbane; this will change in 2026, due to both clubs failing to qualify for the finals that season.

== Method of qualification ==
In the first two seasons of the AFL Women's (AFLW) competition, the grand final was contested by the two highest-ranked teams at the end of the home-and-away season, as no finals series existed.

Since the third season, a finals series has been incorporated into the competition as follows:

- In 2019, the top four teams qualified for the preliminary finals, with the two winners playing off in the 2019 Grand Final.
- An expanded eight-team finals series was abandoned in 2020 due to the impact of the COVID-19 pandemic.
- In 2021 and 2022 season 6, the top six teams qualified for the finals series, which was played under the laws of a single-elimination knockout tournament.
- In 2022 season 7, the Final Eight system used in the AFL was implemented in the AFLW following the league's expansion to include all 18 AFL clubs.

From 2021 onwards, the winners of the two preliminary finals have played off in the Grand Final.

2021 and 2022 (S6) process of qualification for AFLW Grand Final

Qualifying Finals
4	Fourth
5	Fifth
3	Third
6	Sixth

Preliminary Finals
1	First
4	QF Winner
2	Second
3	QF Winner

Grand Final
1	PF Winner
2	PF Winner

== Venues ==
Unlike the men's Australian Football League (AFL) premiership, which has a customary host venue for the AFL Grand Final every year (that being the Melbourne Cricket Ground), there is no centralised venue that is contracted to host the women's grand final. In 2017 and 2018, the game was technically "hosted" by the minor premier: Brisbane and Western Bulldogs, respectively. However, in both cases, alternate venues located in the home team's state were used, owing to the unavailability of the Gabba in Brisbane's case and capacity concerns for the Bulldogs' home grand final. In 2019, it was hosted by the preliminary final winner with the most premiership points (percentage would have come into consideration if points were the same), as a conference system was in place for this season's grand final. The conference-style system was abandoned in favour of a single ladder ahead of the 2021 season. Since 2021, the match is played at the highest-ranked preliminary final winner's home venue (or a larger-capacity venue located nearby), with this ranking based on the ladder at the end of the home-and-away season.

Of the four venues to have hosted a grand final, Princes (Ikon) Park, the largest-capacity suburban ground in Melbourne, underwent construction in 2021 and 2022 to turn it into a state-of-the-art precinct that would become the official home of women's football in Victoria, with the idea that all grand finals hosted in Victoria would be played at the stadium.

=== List of venues to host the grand final ===
Venue	City	State	Grand Finals
Princes Park	Melbourne	Victoria	4 (2018, 2023, 2024, 2025)
Adelaide Oval	Adelaide	South Australia	3 (2019, 2021, 2022 (S6))
Springfield Central Stadium	Brisbane	Queensland	1 (2022 (S7))
Carrara Stadium	Gold Coast	Queensland	1 (2017)

NOTE: There was no grand final held in 2020 due to the impact of the COVID-19 pandemic.

== Entertainment and traditions ==
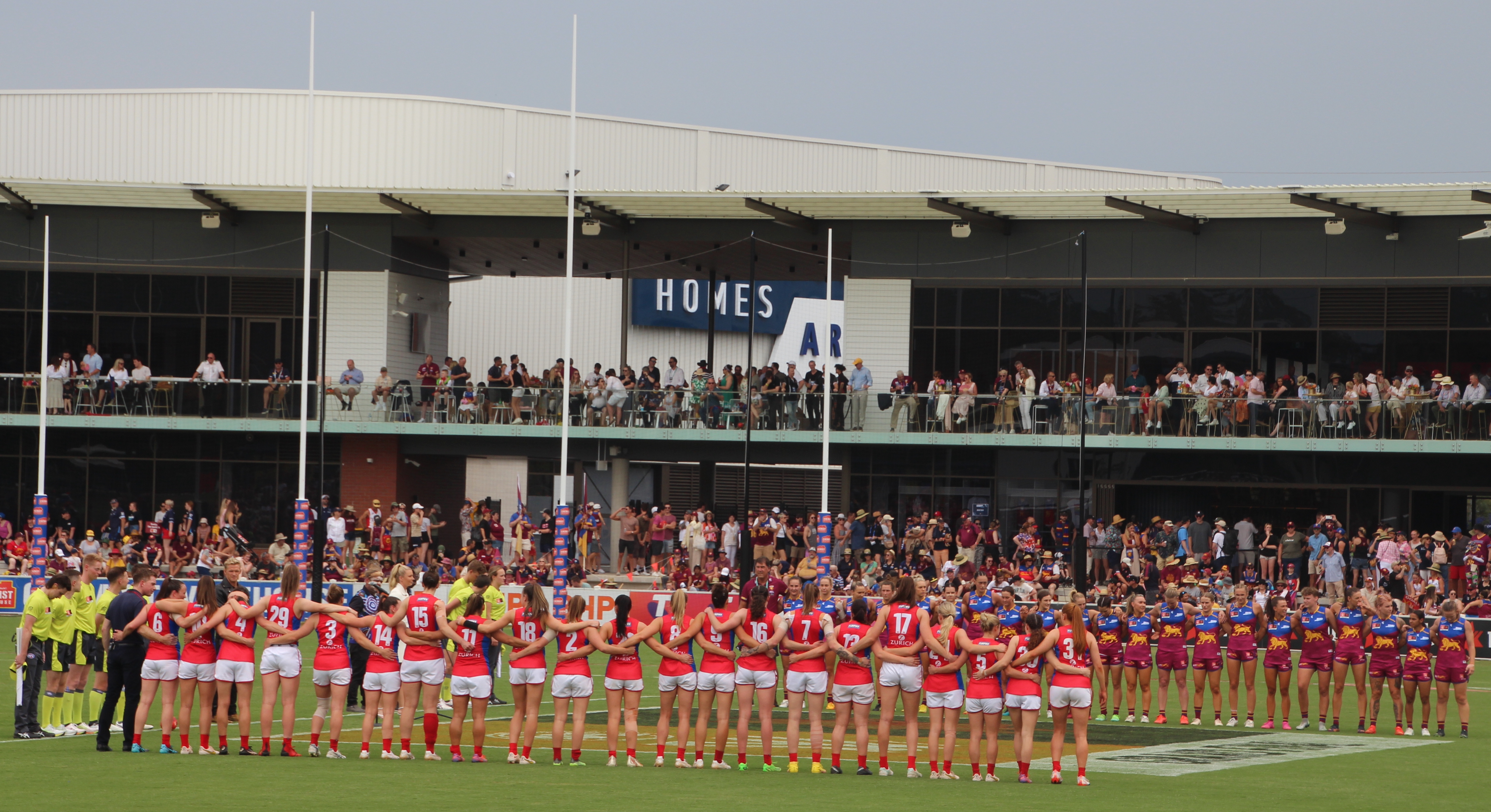
The teams lined up for the national anthem prior to the 2022 (S7) Grand Final

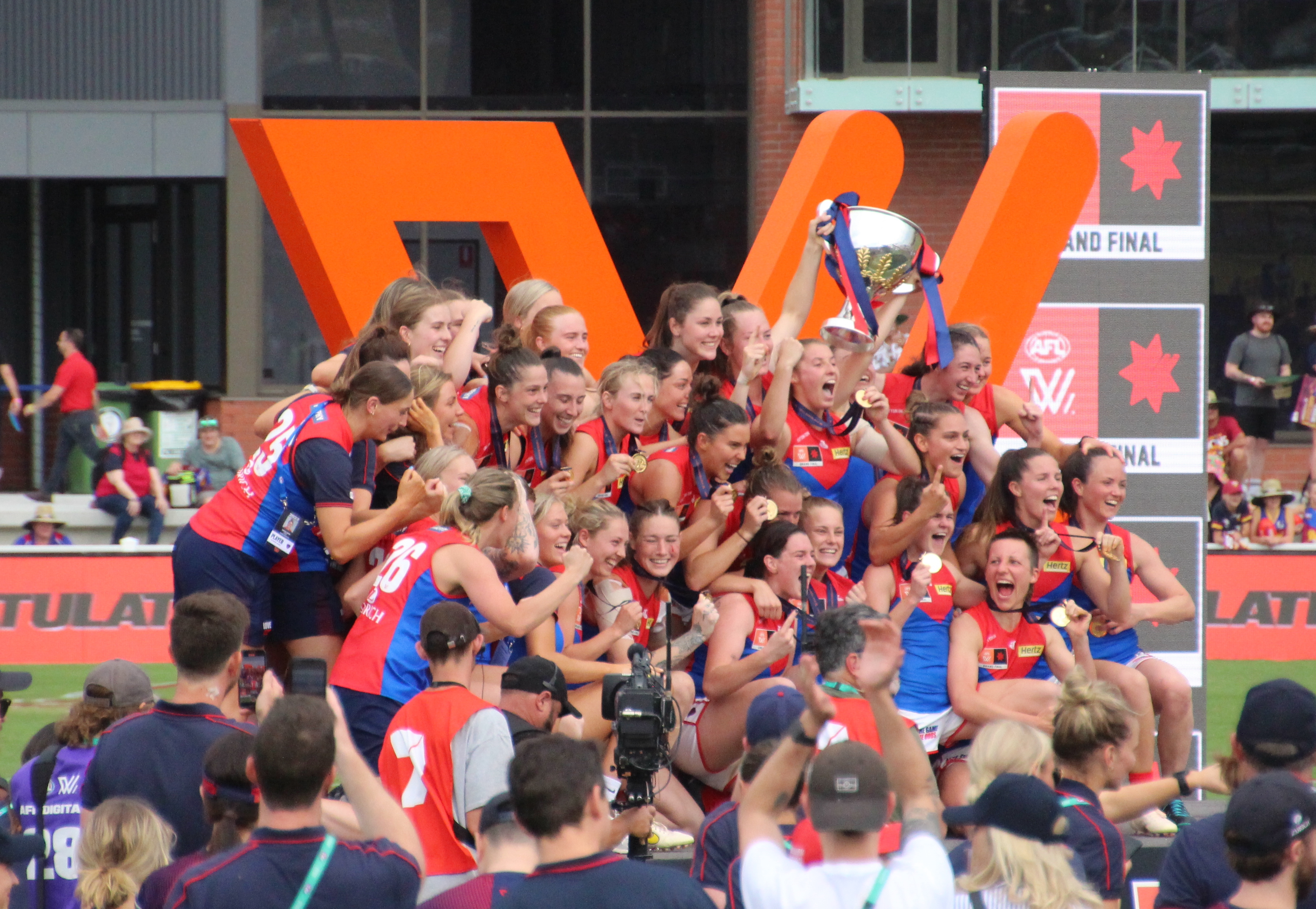
Melbourne players celebrating with their premiership medallions and the 2022 (S7) premiership trophy

It is customary for the Grand Final to begin with a rendition of the Australian National Anthem in which both teams line up opposite each other. Most grand finals thus far have been accompanied by a musical entertainment act that has performed before the match or at half-time. At the conclusion of the match, an award ceremony is held for individual awards, which include a best-on-ground award and premiership medals awarded for each participant. The captains of both sides are invited to make a speech, and the cup is presented to the captain and coach of the winning team. Following the ceremonies, players of the winning side assemble on a podium for team celebration photographs with the premiership cup and premiership medals.

=== Entertainment ===
Musicians and groups to have performed at the grand final include Megan Washington in 2017 and Amy Shark in 2019. Australian musician Missy Higgins was booked to perform at the 2018 Grand Final, but her gig was cancelled on the day of the match due to heavy rain and surface conditions at Princes Park. Delta Goodrem performed the pre-match entertainment at the 2022 season 7 Grand Final.

=== Sprint ===
In 2021, the AFL incorporated a sprint running race (initially known as the Colgate AFLW Grand Final Sprint) into the on-field entertainment on the day of the grand final. In the men's competition, the Grand Final Sprint has been held since 1979 (albeit with a break from 1988–2001). No races were run between 2022 season 7 and 2024.

Grand Final	Sprint winner	Team	Ref
2021	Ruby Svarc	Brisbane	
2022 (S6)	Alana Porter	Collingwood	
2022 (S7)–2024	No sprints run		
2025	Lucy Single	Gold Coast	

== Best on ground ==
The best-on-ground medal is presented to the player judged as best on the ground during the grand final by a panel of experts.

Season	Player	Team	Ref.
2017	Erin Phillips	Adelaide	
2018	Monique Conti	Western Bulldogs	
2019	Erin Phillips	Adelaide	
2021	Kate Lutkins	Brisbane	
2022 (S6)	Anne Hatchard	Adelaide	
2022 (S7)	Shannon Campbell	Brisbane	
2023	Breanna Koenen	Brisbane	
2024	Jasmine Garner	North Melbourne	
2025	Eilish Sheerin	North Melbourne	

== See also ==
- AFL Grand Final
- NRL Women's Grand Final
