= Belle Dawes =

Australian rules footballer

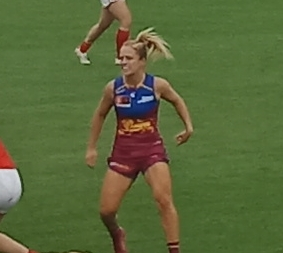

Personal information
- Full name: Isabel Paige Dawes
- Born: 11 May 2001 (age 25)
- Original team: Maroochydore (QWAFL)
- Draft: No. 15, 2019 AFL Women's draft
- Debut: Round 1, 2020, Brisbane vs. Adelaide, at Hickey Park
- Height: 162 cm (5 ft 4 in)
- Position: Midfielder

Club information
- Current club: Brisbane
- Number: 17

Playing career^{1}
Years	Club	Games (Goals)
2020–	Brisbane	85 (14)
- ^{1} Playing statistics correct to the end of the 2025 season.

Career highlights
- AFLW premiership: 2021, 2023; AFL Women's All-Australian team: 2024; Brisbane best and fairest: 2025

Isabel Paige Dawes (born 11 May 2001) is an Australian rules footballer playing for Brisbane in the AFL Women's competition (AFLW).

She spent the early years of her life in Frankston, Victoria before relocating to the Sunshine Coast, Queensland at 12 years of age. As a junior, she often competed in the local boys competition due to a lack of opportunities for girls at the time. She was signed to the Lions Academy at a 13 years old.

She was playing for Maroochydore AFC in the AFL Queensland Women's League when she was drafted by Brisbane with the 15th pick in the 2019 AFL Women's draft.

Dawes made her debut in the Lions' round 1 game against Adelaide at Hickey Park on 8 February 2020. Dawes signed on with Brisbane for one more year on 15 June 2021.

During her time at the Lions, she has won two premierships, in 2021 and 2023; been selected in one All-Australian team, in 2024; and won one Brisbane best and fairest, in 2025.
