= Ellie Hampson =

Australian rules footballer

Personal information
- Born: 8 February 2001 (age 25); Townsville
- Original team: Hermit Park (AFL Townsville)
- Draft: 2019 pre-list signing
- Height: 169 cm (5 ft 7 in)
- Position: Midfield-Forward

Club information
- Current club: Port Adelaide

Playing career^{1}
Years	Club	Games (Goals)
2020–2022 (S7)	Gold Coast	23 (5)
2023–2025	Brisbane	31 (17)
2026–	Port Adelaide	0 (0)
Total		54 (22)
- ^{1} Playing statistics correct to the end of the 2025 season.

Career highlights
- AFLW premiership player: 2023

Ellie Hampson (born 8 February 2001) is an Australian rules footballer playing for Port Adelaide in the AFL Women's competition (AFLW). She previously played for Gold Coast and Brisbane.

== Early life ==
Hampson grew up in Townsville and attended William Ross State High School. She grew up playing soccer and was considered an outstanding prospect. At the age of 15, she began playing Australian rules football for the Hermit Park Football Club and was a junior state representative in both sports but decided to focus on the latter due to better junior pathways. She was one of the Gold Coast Suns' three inaugural signings for the women's list and her acquisition was announced on her 18th birthday. She signed with the Gold Coast Suns Academy and relocated to the Gold Coast for the 2019 season and began playing QAFLW football for Coorparoo. She would go on to play part in Coorparoo's 2019 QAFLW premiership and was named an Under 18 All-Australian as well as Queensland's MVP at the 2019 AFL Women's Under 18 Championships. In 2020, Hampson switched QAFLW clubs and began playing for the Bond University Bull Sharks.

== AFLW career ==
Hampson made her AFLW debut for Gold Coast against Richmond in round 2 of the 2020 AFL Women's season.

At the end of 2022 season 7, she was traded to Brisbane as part of a five-club deal.

After three seasons, 31 games and a premiership with Brisbane, she was traded to Port Adelaide.

== Statistics ==
Statistics are correct to the end of the 2025 season.

Legend
G	Goals	K	Kicks	D	Disposals	T	Tackles
B	Behinds	H	Handballs	M	Marks
#	Played in that season's premiership team

Season	Team	No.	Games	Totals							Averages (per game)							Votes
Season	Team	No.	Games	G	B	K	H	D	M	T	G	B	K	H	D	M	T	Votes
2020	Gold Coast	21	6	0	0	28	27	55	7	21	0.0	0.0	4.7	4.5	9.2	1.2	3.5	0
2021	Gold Coast	21	1	0	0	5	4	9	0	3	0.0	0.0	5.0	4.0	9.0	0.0	3.0	0
2022 (S6)	Gold Coast	1	8	3	1	56	34	90	8	34	0.4	0.1	7.0	4.3	11.3	1.0	4.3	2
2022 (S7)	Gold Coast	1	8	2	5	65	57	122	10	27	0.3	0.6	8.1	7.1	15.3	1.3	3.4	1
2023^{#}	Brisbane	7	12	5	2	50	33	83	9	28	0.2	0.0	4.2	2.8	6.9	0.8	2.3	0
2024	Brisbane	7	10	4	3	52	30	82	14	22	0.4	0.3	5.2	3.0	8.2	1.4	2.2	0
2025	Brisbane	7	9	8	4	50	41	91	11	16	0.9	0.4	5.6	4.6	10.1	1.2	1.8	2
Career			54	22	15	306	226	532	59	151	0.4	0.3	5.7	4.2	9.9	1.1	2.8	5
