= Charlotte Mullins =

Australian rules footballer

Personal information
- Born: 28 October 2004 (age 22)
- Original team: Aspley (QAFLW)
- Draft: No. 70, 2022 AFL Women's draft
- Debut: 3 September 2023, Brisbane vs. Richmond, at Springfield Central Stadium
- Height: 166 cm (5 ft 5 in)
- Position: Midfield

Club information
- Current club: Brisbane
- Number: 28

Playing career^{1}
Years	Club	Games (Goals)
2023–	Brisbane	13 (8)
- ^{1} Playing statistics correct to the end of the 2023 season.

Career highlights
- AFLW premiership player: 2023; Signature

Charlotte Mullins (born 28 October 2004) is an Australian rules footballer playing for Brisbane in the AFL Women's competition (AFLW).

== Early life ==
Mullins was raised in the Brisbane suburb of North Lakes, Queensland in the City of Moreton Bay and played junior football with North Lakes and Ferny Grove before moving to Brisbane to join the Brisbane Lions Academy. There she played junior and senior football with Wilston Grange and Aspley. She represented Queensland in the AFL Women's Under-18 Championships in both 2021 and 2022.

Mullins was playing for Aspley in the AFL Queensland Women's League when she was drafted by Brisbane with the 70th pick in the 2022 AFL Women's draft.

== AFLW Career ==
Mullins debuted for the Lions on 3 September 2023 in the opening round match against the Richmond at Springfield Central Stadium.

An outside midfielder, she often plays on the wing and has good goal sense.
