= Shannon Campbell =

Australian rules footballer (born 1996)

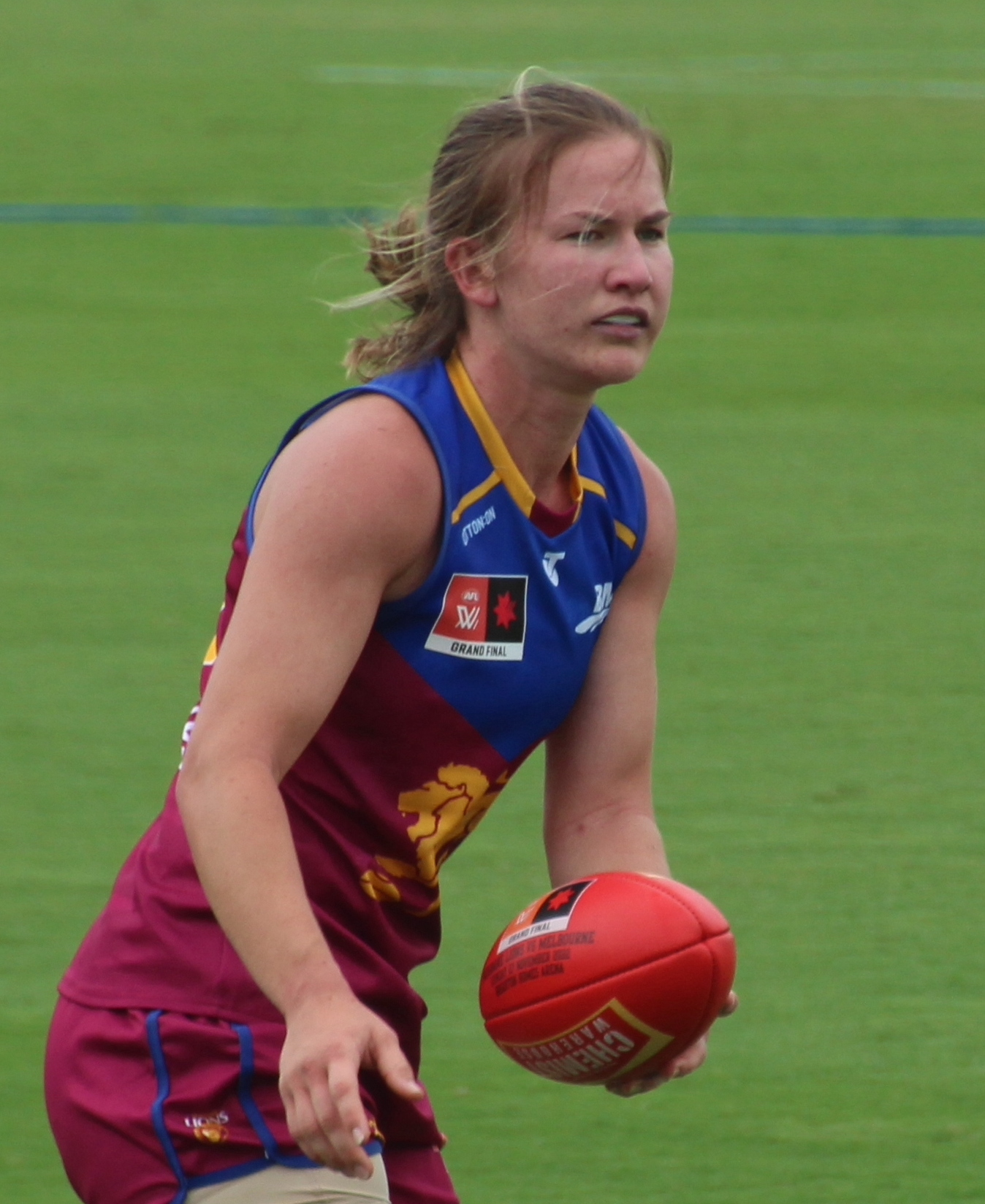
- Campbell playing for Brisbane in the 2022 season 7 Grand Final

Personal information
- Full name: Shannon Campbell
- Born: 24 September 1996 (age 30); Sunshine Coast, Queensland
- Original team: Wilston Grange (QWAFL)
- Draft: Free agent, 2016
- Debut: Round 1, 2017, Brisbane vs. Melbourne, at Casey Fields
- Height: 171 cm (5 ft 7 in)
- Position: Defender

Club information
- Current club: Brisbane
- Number: 20

Playing career^{1}
Years	Club	Games (Goals)
2017–	Brisbane	75 (8)
- ^{1} Playing statistics correct to the end of the 2023 season.

Career highlights
- AFLW premiership player: 2021, 2023; AFL Women's Grand Final best-on-ground: 2022 (S7)

Shannon Campbell (born 24 September 1996) is an Australian rules footballer playing for the Brisbane Lions in the AFL Women's.

== Early life ==
Campbell was born in 1996 in Sunshine Coast, Queensland. She played her early football with the Maroochydore before moving to Brisbane to play for Wilston Grange when she was drafted.

== AFLW career ==
Campbell was recruited by Brisbane as a free agent before the 2017 season. She made her debut in the Lions' inaugural game against Melbourne at Casey Fields on 5 February 2017.

Brisbane signed Campbell for the 2018 season during the trade period in May 2017.

Campbell signed on with Brisbane for 2 more years on 15 June 2021.
