= Bella Eddey =

Australian rules footballer

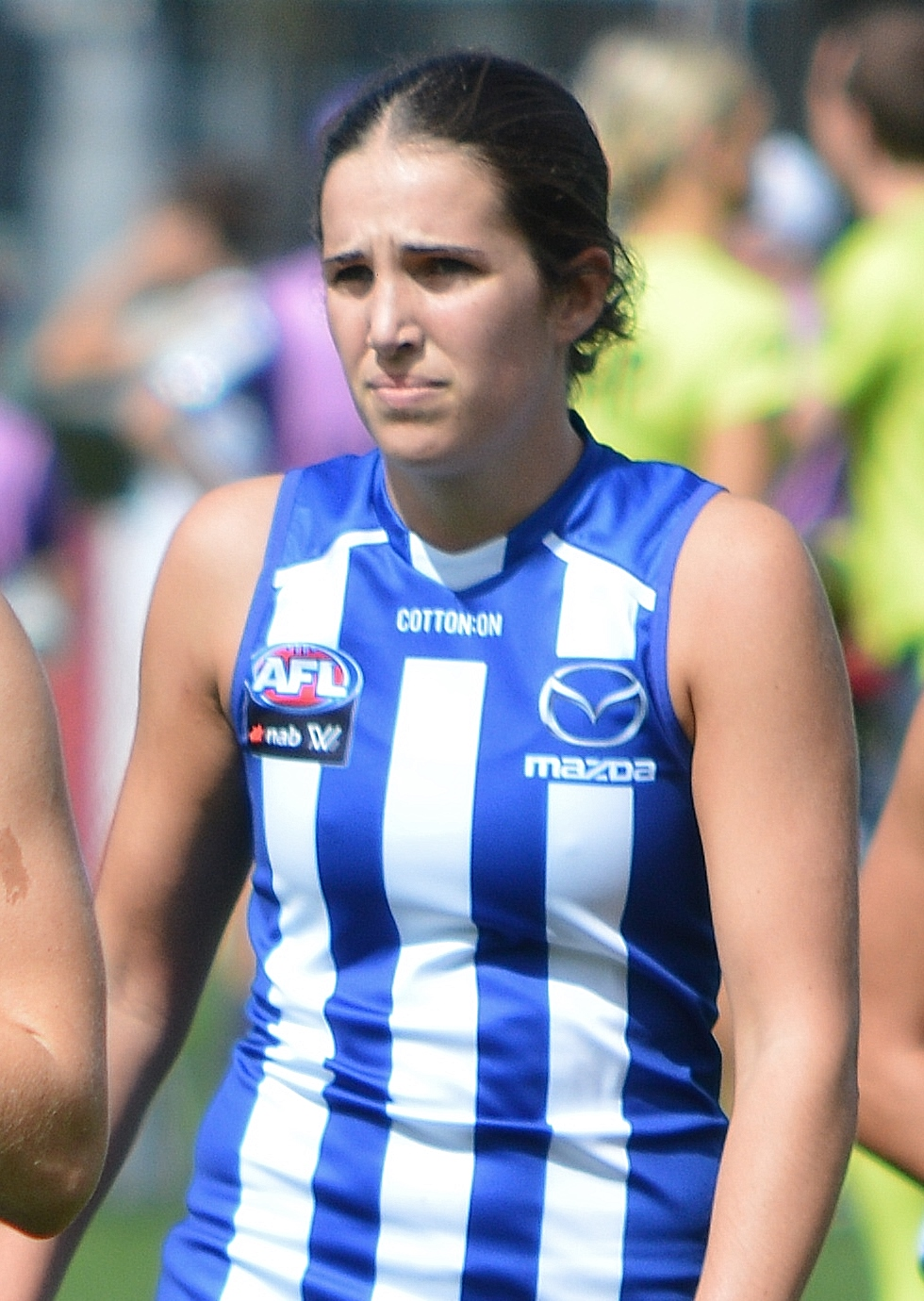
- Eddey with North Melbourne in March 2021

Personal information
- Full name: Isabella Eddey
- Born: 11 February 2002 (age 24)
- Original team: Sandringham Dragons (NAB League Girls)
- Draft: No. 13, 2020 AFLW draft
- Debut: Round 1, 2021, North Melbourne vs. Geelong, at GMHBA Stadium
- Height: 162 cm (5 ft 4 in)
- Position: Midfielder

Club information
- Current club: North Melbourne
- Number: 3

Playing career^{1}
Years	Club	Games (Goals)
2021–	North Melbourne	61 (27)
- ^{1} Playing statistics correct to the end of the 2024 season.

Career highlights
- 2x AFLW premiership player: 2024, 2025

Isabella Eddey (born 11 February 2002) is an Australian rules footballer playing for North Melbourne in the AFL Women's. She grew up in Melbourne’s bayside suburbs and attended Haileybury College.

== Junior career ==
As a junior, Eddey played as an outside midfielder for the Sandringham Dragons in the NAB League Girls and also represented her region, Vic Metro, at the AFLW Under 18 Championships. In 2020, she played three matches in the NAB League, amassing an average of 17.7 disposals, and earning an invitation to the Victorian AFLW draft combine. However, restrictions imposed due to the COVID-19 pandemic would ultimately force the rest of the NAB League season and the Victorian combine to be cancelled.

Despite these interruptions, several commentators considered Eddey an elite prospect, likely to be selected early in the 2020 AFLW draft. Kevin Sheehan ranked Eddey among his top 30 potential draftees, noting her "silky skills", goal sense, composure, and footwork in contested situations. Sarah Black, a womens.afl journalist, concurred with Sheehan's praise and also highlighted Eddey's targeted passes and strong running ability. She predicted Eddey would be selected around pick 16 in the 2020 draft.

== AFLW career ==
Eddey would ultimately be recruited a few picks earlier than Black's prediction by North Melbourne, who selected her with pick 13 in the 2020 draft, their first selection. She made her debut in the opening round of the 2021 season against Geelong, kicking her first goal by capitalising on a loose ball in the goalsquare. It was revealed she signed on with the club for two more seasons on 17 June 2021, tying her to the club until the end of 2023.

== Statistics ==
Updated to the end of the 2024 season.

Legend
G	Goals	K	Kicks	D	Disposals	T	Tackles
B	Behinds	H	Handballs	M	Marks
#	Played in that season's premiership team

Season	Team	No.	Games	Totals							Averages (per game)							Votes
Season	Team	No.	Games	G	B	K	H	D	M	T	G	B	K	H	D	M	T	Votes
2021	North Melbourne	3	10	3	0	19	33	52	9	13	0.3	0.0	1.9	3.3	5.2	0.9	1.3	
2022 (S6)	North Melbourne	3	11	1	0	49	58	107	27	17	0.1	0.0	4.5	5.3	9.7	2.5	1.5	
2022 (S7)	North Melbourne	3	13	5	2	59	60	119	18	29	0.4	0.2	4.5	4.6	9.2	1.4	2.2	
2023	North Melbourne	3	12	8	3	60	68	128	15	38	0.6	0.2	4.6	5.2	9.8	1.2	2.9	
2024^{#}	North Melbourne	3	14	10	7	76	92	168	14	46	0.7	0.5	5.4	6.6	12.0	1.0	3.3	
Career			61	27	12	263	311	574	83	143	0.4	0.2	4.3	5.1	9.4	1.4	2.3	
