= Quentin Hull =

Australian sports journalist

Quentin Hull is an Australian sports journalist at the Australian Broadcasting Corporation (ABC). He has covered a number of prestigious tennis tournaments including the Australian Open, the Davis Cup, and has been part of the BBC Radio team at Wimbledon. Hull's expertise also extends to calling the Australian Football League (AFL), rugby league, rugby union and cricket for ABC Grandstand Radio. Hull regularly commentates for ABC TV on events such as the Hopman Cup tennis, Super Series Lawn Bowls and Nine Ball.

Hull is based in Brisbane, Australia, but started his media career at The Daily Advertiser in his hometown of Wagga Wagga, in the New South Wales (NSW) Riverina.
