= Amy Smith (footballer) =

Australian rules footballer (born 1998)

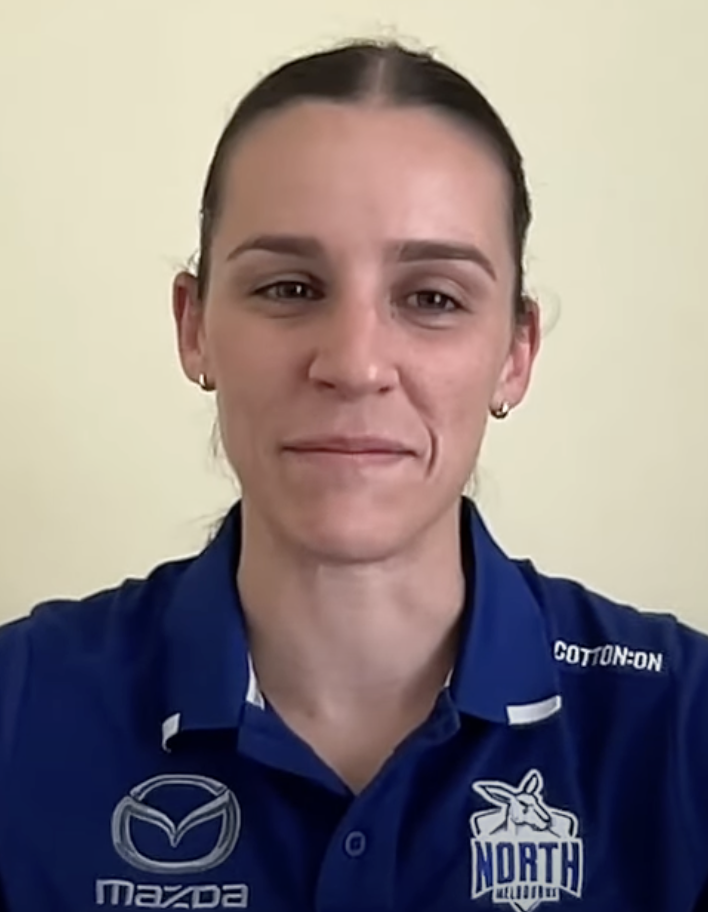
- Smith in 2024

Personal information
- Born: 10 November 1998 (age 27)
- Original team: Williamstown (VFLW)
- Height: 170 cm (5 ft 7 in)
- Position: Midfield

Club information
- Current club: North Melbourne
- Number: 15

Playing career^{1}
Years	Club	Games (Goals)
2021–	North Melbourne	60 (6)
- ^{1} Playing statistics correct to the end of the 2025 season.

Career highlights
- 2x AFLW premiership player: 2024, 2025

Amy Smith (born 10 November 1998) is an Australian rules footballer playing for the North Melbourne Football Club in the AFL Women's competition (AFLW). Smith was drafted by North Melbourne with the 55th pick overall in the 2020 AFL Women's draft. She was the first father–daughter selection for the club, being the daughter of Shaun Smith who played 47 games for the men's team.

Prior to being drafted, Smith played with Williamstown in the VFL Women's competition and with Aberfeldie in the Essendon District Football League (EDFL).

== Statistics ==
Updated to the end of the 2024 season.

Legend
G	Goals	K	Kicks	D	Disposals	T	Tackles
B	Behinds	H	Handballs	M	Marks
#	Played in that season's premiership team

Season	Team	No.	Games	Totals							Averages (per game)							Votes
Season	Team	No.	Games	G	B	K	H	D	M	T	G	B	K	H	D	M	T	Votes
2022 (S6)	North Melbourne	15	6	0	0	20	28	48	11	19	0.0	0.0	3.3	4.7	8.0	1.8	3.2	
2022 (S7)	North Melbourne	15	12	1	0	59	57	116	11	71	0.1	0.0	4.9	4.8	9.7	0.9	5.9	
2023	North Melbourne	15	13	1	2	54	92	146	20	73	0.1	0.2	4.2	7.1	11.2	1.5	5.6	
2024^{#}	North Melbourne	15	14	1	0	77	99	176	29	65	0.1	0.0	5.5	7.1	12.6	2.1	4.6	
Career			45	3	2	210	276	486	71	228	0.1	0.0	4.7	6.1	10.8	1.6	5.1	
