= Ruby Svarc =

Australian rules footballer

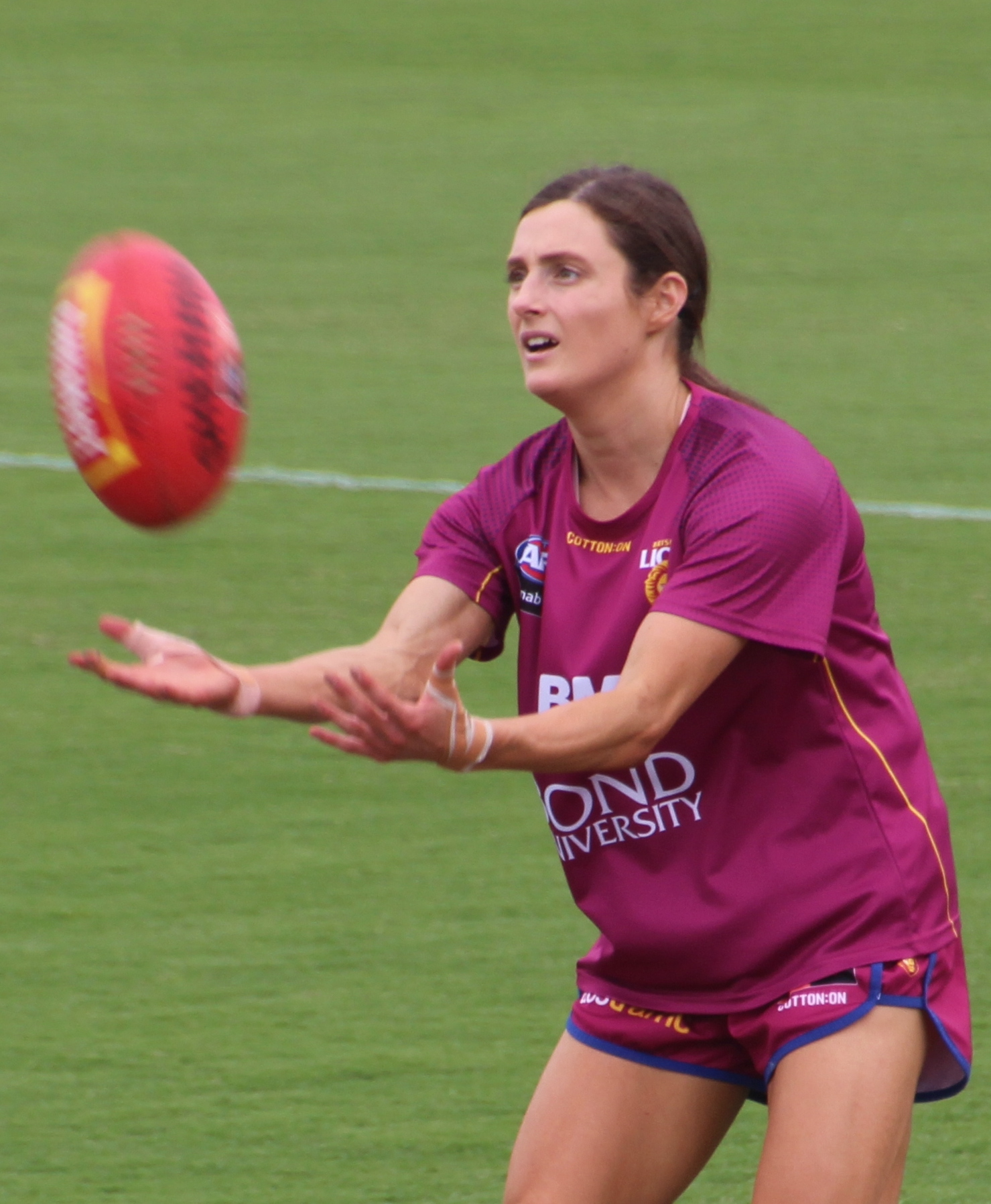
- Svarc warming up before the 2022 season 7 Grand Final

Personal information
- Born: 28 September 1993 (age 33)
- Original team: Essendon (VFLW)
- Draft: No. 38, 2020 AFL Women's draft
- Debut: Round 3, 2022 (S6), Brisbane vs. Carlton, at Carrara Stadium
- Height: 161 cm (5 ft 3 in)
- Position: Defender/wing

Club information
- Current club: Brisbane
- Number: 29

Playing career^{1}
Years	Club	Games (Goals)
2021–	Brisbane	29 (7)
- ^{1} Playing statistics correct to the end of the 2023 season.

Career highlights
- AFLW premiership player: 2023

Ruby Svarc (born 28 September 1993) is an Australian rules footballer who plays for Brisbane in the AFL Women's (AFLW).

Svarc is from Corowa, New South Wales and grew up on a farm with older sister Cathy Svarc in a family passionate about Australian rules.

She grew up playing soccer, volleyball and cricket. Though she played Australian rules informally on the farm, she did not play the sport in New South Wales as there were few opportunities for young girls to play. It wasn't until she was 19 that she moved to Melbourne and began playing with St Mary's Salesian in the Victorian Amateur Football Association that she developed a desire to play the sport at the highest level.

She played for Essendon in the VFL Women's before being drafted by Brisbane with the 38th pick in the 2020 AFL Women's draft.

She spent the 2021 season on the Lions' list without making her debut and was announced as a delisting at the end of the season. She was, however, shortly afterwards reinstated to the Lions' list for 2022 season 6, and made her AFLW debut in round 3 that season in the Lions' win against Carlton at Carrara Stadium.

She won the inaugural AFL Women's Grand Final sprint in 2021.
