= Kim Rennie =

Australian rules footballer

Personal information
- Born: 19 October 1994 (age 32)
- Draft: Rookie signing, 2017
- Debut: Round 4, 2018, Western Bulldogs vs. Carlton, at VU Whitten Oval
- Height: 185 cm (6 ft 1 in)
- Position: Forward

Club information
- Current club: North Melbourne
- Number: 26

Playing career^{1}
Years	Club	Games (Goals)
2018–2021	Western Bulldogs	24 (1)
2022–	North Melbourne	49 (1)
Total		73 (2)
- ^{1} Playing statistics correct to the end of the 2023 season.

Career highlights
- 3x AFLW premiership player: 2018, 2024, 2025

Kim Rennie (born 19 October 1994) is an Australian rules footballer who plays for North Melbourne in the AFL Women's (AFLW). She has previously played for the Western Bulldogs, having been signed as a rookie in 2017, after having converted to the sport from a previous background in basketball. She was upgraded to the Bulldogs' main playing list following an injury to captain Katie Brennan and subsequently made her debut in the 73-point win over Carlton at VU Whitten Oval in round 4 of the 2018 season. She requested a trade to North Melbourne in May 2021, but North Melbourne and the Western Bulldogs were unable to reach an agreement, leaving her at the Bulldogs at the conclusion of the trade period. A few weeks later it was announced that Rennie declined the Western Bulldogs' contract offer and was delisted by the club. In the 2021 AFL Women's draft, Rennie joined North Melbourne, who used the 28th pick for her.

== Statistics ==
Updated to the end of the 2024 season.

Legend
G	Goals	K	Kicks	D	Disposals	T	Tackles
B	Behinds	H	Handballs	M	Marks
#	Played in that season's premiership team

Season	Team	No.	Games	Totals							Averages (per game)							Votes
Season	Team	No.	Games	G	B	K	H	D	M	T	G	B	K	H	D	M	T	Votes
2018	Western Bulldogs	26	5	0	0	11	8	19	4	13	0.0	0.0	2.2	1.6	3.8	0.8	2.6	
2019	Western Bulldogs	26	7	0	0	24	9	33	5	12	0.0	0.0	3.4	1.3	4.7	0.7	1.7	
2020	Western Bulldogs	26	6	1	0	25	21	46	9	16	0.1	0.0	4.2	3.5	7.7	1.5	2.7	
2021	Western Bulldogs	26	6	0	0	13	21	34	8	9	0.0	0.0	2.2	3.5	5.7	1.3	1.5	
2022 (S6)	North Melbourne	25	10	0	0	29	37	66	18	19	0.0	0.0	2.9	3.7	6.6	1.8	1.9	
2022 (S7)	North Melbourne	25	12	1	0	55	37	92	12	41	0.1	0.0	4.6	3.1	7.7	1.0	3.4	
2023	North Melbourne	25	13	0	1	65	50	122	25	34	0.0	0.1	5.0	5.6	10.6	2.5	2.4	
2024^{#}	North Melbourne	3	14	0	1	72	50	122	25	34	0.0	0.1	5.1	3.6	8.7	1.8	2.4	
Career			73	2	2	294	256	550	114	175	0.0	0.0	4.0	3.5	7.5	1.6	2.4	
