= Eilish Sheerin =

Australian rules footballer (born 1992)

Personal information
- Full name: Eilish Sheerin
- Born: 5 October 1992 (age 34)
- Original team: Newtown Breakaways (AFL Sydney)
- Draft: No. 58, 2022 national draft
- Debut: Round 1, 2022 (S7), Richmond vs. Geelong, at GMHBA Stadium
- Height: 175 cm (5 ft 9 in)
- Position: Half-back

Club information
- Current club: North Melbourne

Playing career^{1}
Years	Club	Games (Goals)
2022 (S7)–2024	Richmond	32 (6)
2025–	North Melbourne	9 (4)
Total		43 (10)
- ^{1} Playing statistics correct to the end of the 2025 season.

Career highlights
- AFLW premiership player: 2025; AFL Women's Grand Final best-on-ground: 2025; AFL Women's All-Australian team: 2022 (S7), 2023

Eilish Sheerin (born 5 October 1992) is an Australian rules footballer with North Melbourne in the AFL Women's (AFLW). Sheerin was drafted by Richmond with their second selection and fifty-eighth overall in the 2022 AFL Women's draft. She made her debut against Geelong at GMHBA Stadium in the first round of 2022 season 7.

Sheerin was traded to North Melbourne in exchange for draft pick 18 in the 2024 trade period.

== Statistics ==
Statistics are correct to end 2025

Legend
G	Goals	K	Kicks	D	Disposals	T	Tackles
B	Behinds	H	Handballs	M	Marks

Season	Team	No.	Games	Totals							Averages (per game)						
Season	Team	No.	Games	G	B	K	H	D	M	T	G	B	K	H	D	M	T
2022 (S7)	Richmond	31	12	1	3	105	90	195	21	44	0.1	0.3	8.8	7.5	16.3	1.8	3.7
2023	Richmond	2	10	0	0	105	63	168	28	53	0	0	10.5	6.3	16.8	2.8	5.3
2024	Richmond	2	10	5	3	126	58	184	12	74	0.5	0.3	12.6	5.8	18.4	1.2	7.4
2025	North Melbourne	4	9	4	2	93	79	172	18	49	0.4	0.2	10.3	8.8	19.1	2	5.4
Career			41	10	8	429	290	719	79	220	0.2	0.2	10.5	7.1	17.5	1.9	5.4
