= List of AFL Women's premiers =

This page is a complete chronological listing of AFL Women's premiers. The AFL Women's (AFLW) is the elite national competition in women's Australian rules football.

Each year, the premiership is awarded to the club that wins the AFL Women's Grand Final. The grand final was hosted by the minor premier in the first two seasons when no finals series existed, and was hosted by the preliminary final winner with more premiership points (percentage would have come into consideration if points were the same) in 2019 when a conference system was in place. Since 2021, the grand final has been hosted by the higher-ranked preliminary final winner. In 2020, no premiership was awarded after the season was curtailed and eventually cancelled due to the COVID-19 pandemic.

Adelaide has won the most premierships with three, while Brisbane and North Melbourne have won two each, and Melbourne and the Western Bulldogs one each.

== List of premiers ==
The following is a list of premiers and the grand final results.

No premiership was awarded

Season	Premiers		Runners-up		Best on ground		Venue	Crowd	Date	Ref.
Season	Club	Score	Club	Score	Player	Club	Venue	Crowd	Date	Ref.
2017	Adelaide	4.11 (35)	Brisbane	4.5 (29)	Erin Phillips	Adelaide	Metricon Stadium	15,610	25 March 2017	
2018	Western Bulldogs	4.3 (27)	Brisbane	3.3 (21)	Monique Conti	Western Bulldogs	Ikon Park	7,083	24 March 2018	
2019	Adelaide (2)	10.3 (63)	Carlton	2.6 (18)	Erin Phillips	Adelaide	Adelaide Oval	53,034	31 March 2019	
2020										
2021	Brisbane	6.2 (38)	Adelaide	3.2 (20)	Kate Lutkins	Brisbane	Adelaide Oval	22,934	17 April 2021	
2022 (S6)	Adelaide (3)	4.5 (29)	Melbourne	2.4 (16)	Anne Hatchard	Adelaide	Adelaide Oval	16,712	9 April 2022	
2022 (S7)	Melbourne	2.7 (19)	Brisbane	2.3 (15)	Shannon Campbell	Brisbane	Brighton Homes Arena	7,412	27 November 2022	
2023	Brisbane (2)	7.2 (44)	North Melbourne	4.3 (27)	Breanna Koenen	Brisbane	Ikon Park	12,616	3 December 2023	
2024	North Melbourne	6.3 (39)	Brisbane	1.3 (9)	Jasmine Garner	North Melbourne	Ikon Park	12,122	30 November 2024	
2025	North Melbourne (2)	9.2 (56)	Brisbane	2.4 (16)	Eilish Sheerin	North Melbourne	Ikon Park	12,741	29 November 2025	

== Premiership statistics ==
=== Premierships by team ===
Club	Premierships		Runners-up		Grand finals	Seasons since last premiership
Club	Total	Seasons	Total	Seasons	Grand finals	Seasons since last premiership
Adelaide	3	2017, 2019, S6	1	2021	4	4
Brisbane	2	2021, 2023	5	2017, 2018, S7, 2024, 2025	7	2
North Melbourne	2	2024, 2025	1	2023	3	0
Melbourne	1	S7	1	S6	2	3
Western Bulldogs	1	2018	0	—	1	8
Carlton	0	—	1	2019	1	—
Collingwood	0	—	0	—	0	—
Essendon	0	—	0	—	0	—
Fremantle	0	—	0	—	0	—
Geelong	0	—	0	—	0	—
Gold Coast	0	—	0	—	0	—
Greater Western Sydney	0	—	0	—	0	—
Hawthorn	0	—	0	—	0	—
Port Adelaide	0	—	0	—	0	—
Richmond	0	—	0	—	0	—
St Kilda	0	—	0	—	0	—
Sydney	0	—	0	—	0	—
West Coast	0	—	0	—	0	—

=== Premiership frequency ===
The 2020 season is not included in the latter three columns, as the season was not fully contested and no premiership was awarded.

Club	Seasons	Seasons	Premierships	Runners-up	Strike rate	Average seasons per	
Club	Seasons	Seasons	Premierships	Runners-up	Strike rate	Premiership	Grand final
Adelaide	2017–present	10	3	1	33.33%	3.00	2.25
North Melbourne	2019–present	8	2	1	28.57%	3.50	2.33
Brisbane	2017–present	10	2	5	22.22%	4.50	1.29
Melbourne	2017–present	10	1	1	11.11%	9.00	4.50
Western Bulldogs	2017–present	10	1	0	11.11%	9.00	9.00
Carlton	2017–present	10	0	1	0.00%	—	9.00
Collingwood	2017–present	10	0	0	0.00%	—	—
Fremantle	2017–present	10	0	0	0.00%	—	—
Greater Western Sydney	2017–present	10	0	0	0.00%	—	—
Geelong	2019–present	8	0	0	0.00%	—	—
Gold Coast	2020–present	7	0	0	0.00%	—	—
Richmond	2020–present	7	0	0	0.00%	—	—
St Kilda	2020–present	7	0	0	0.00%	—	—
West Coast	2020–present	7	0	0	0.00%	—	—
Essendon	2022 (S7)–present	4	0	0	0.00%	—	—
Hawthorn	2022 (S7)–present	4	0	0	0.00%	—	—
Port Adelaide	2022 (S7)–present	4	0	0	0.00%	—	—
Sydney	2022 (S7)–present	4	0	0	0.00%	—	—

== See also ==
- AFL Women's Grand Final
- List of VFL Women's premiers
- List of VFL/AFL premiers

== Sources ==
- Official AFL Women's website
