= North Melbourne Football Club honour roll =

Australian rules football honours list

This page is the complete honour roll of the North Melbourne Football Club.

From 1869 till 1875 North competed in and helped organise the challenge cup. In 1876 the club amalgamated with Albert-park Football Club to form Albert-park cum North Melbourne.

In 1877 the club reformed as Hotham FC and joined the newly formed VFA as a founding club. North competed in the VFA from 1877 until 1924. In 1925 the club was promoted to the premier competition in the country, the VFL.

In 1990, with the addition of the Adelaide Football Club the VFL changed its name to the AFL. North continues to compete in the AFL to this day.

== Challenge Cup years ==
Year	W: D: L	Position	President	Secretary	Treasurer	Coach	Captain	Vice-Captain	Best and Fairest	Leading goalkicker
1869	?	?	J. McIndoe	J. H. Gardiner	R. Collie	?	W. Marshall	?	-	?
1870	?	?	J. McIndoe	J. H. Gardiner	T. A. Crockett.	?	H. Fuhrhop	?	-	?
1871	?	?	J. McIndoe	J. H. Gardiner	T. A. Crockett.	?	H. Fuhrhop	?	-	?
1872	?	?	R. J. Alcock	J. H. Gardiner	J. H. Gardiner	?	H. Fuhrhop	?	-	?
1873	7:6:1	?	R. J. Alcock	W. McGibbon	J. H. Gardiner	?	H. Fuhrhop	?	-	?
1874	7:2:2	4th	Dr. Burke	A. Hastings	A. Hastings	?	H. Fuhrhop	?	-	?
1875	6:3:2	4th	R. Sutcliffe	A. Hastings	J. McIndoe	?	H. Fuhrhop	?	-	?

== Amalgamation years ==
Year	W: D: L	Position
1876	8:1:2	3rd

== VFA years ==
Year	W: D: L	Position	President	Secretary	Treasurer	Coach	Captain	Vice-Captain	Best and Fairest	Leading Goalkicker
1877	7:2:5	3rd	R. Sutcliffe	J. McIndoe	J. H. Gardiner	?	H. Fuhrhop	?	-	?
1878	9:3:4	4th	R. Sutcliff	J. McIndoe	J. H. Gardiner	?	J. Robertson	?	-	?
1879	6:2:6	4th	R. Sutcliffe	W. M. Burdick	J. H. Gardiner	?	G. Bruce	?	-	?
1880	10:5:4	5th	R. Sutcliffe	W. M. Burdick	J. H. Gardiner	?	H. Fuhrhop	?	-	?
1881	6:3:11	7th	R. Sutcliffe	W. Neeley	J. H. Gardiner	?	A. Ley	?	-	?
1882	12:?:?	5th	E. Harcourt	E. J. Lawrence	D. Wilson	?	H. Pullen	?	-	?
1883	7:8:7	6th	E. Harcourt	E. J. Lawrence/F. Gray	D. Wilson	?	H. Pullen/A. Young	?	-	A. Todd/H. Todd 10
1884	12:3:7	3rd	E. Harcourt	F. Gray	W.L.Guest	?	A. Ley	?	-	H. Todd 13
1885	15:5:6	5th	E. Harcourt	F. Gray	W.L.Guest	?	A. Ley	?	-	D.Houston 35
1886	14:6:7	6th	R.K. Montgomerie	J. Munro	M. Evans	?	Wal Johnson	?	-	?
1887	8:6:12	8th	M. Evans	J. Munro	W. R. Mullens	?	A. Ley/H. Todd	?	-	?
1888	8:5:7	7th	M. Evans	F. Mitchell	M. Evans	?	Will Johnson	?	-	?
1889	11:1:8	6th	M. Evans	F. Mitchell	E. Starkey	?	H. Todd	?	-	?
1890	9:4:6	5th	M. Evans	F. Mitchell	E. Starkey	?	R. Houston	?	-	?
1891	3:8:9	8th	M. Evans	F. Mitchell	G. Bailey	?	E. Bean	?	-	?
1892	4:2:14	11th	Cr J. Barwise	F. Mitchell	E. E. Bean	?	E. Bean	?	-	?
1893	3:2:15	13th	Cr J. Barwise	A. J. Woodham	E. E. Bean	?	R. Gibson	?	-	?
1894	8:6:4	6th	Cr J. Barwise	A. J. Woodham	G. K. Stewart	?	S. Rolent	?	-	?
1895	7:1:10	8th	Cr J. Barwise	A. J. Woodham	G. K. Stewart	?	T.C. Wilson	?	-	?
1896	8:1:9	6th	Dr. N.M. O'Donnell	A. J. Woodham	G. K. Stewart	?	W. Stuckey	?	-	?
1897	14:?:?	2nd	Cr J. Barwise	A. J. Woodham	G. K. Stewart	?	W. Stuckey	?	-	?
1898	12:?:?	2nd	Cr D. Wadick	A. J. Woodham	G. K. Stewart	?	R. Houston	?	-	?
1899	17:?:?	2nd	Cr. W. H. Fuller	A. J. Woodham	G. K. Stewart	?	S. Rolent	?	-	?
1900	8:0:8	5th	Cr. W. H. Fuller	G. K. Stewart	A. Conabare	?	D. Noonan	?	-	?
1901	11:1:4	3rd	Cr J. H. Gardiner	G. K. Stewart	A. Conabare	?	D. Noonan	?	-	?
1902	10:1:5	3rd	Cr. G. M. Prendergast MLA	G. K. Stewart	A. Conabare	?	D. Noonan	?	-	?
1903	18:1:2	1st	Cr. G. M. Prendergast MLA	A. J. Woodham	A. Conabare	?	P. Noonan	?	-	?
1904	15:?:?	1st	Cr. G. M. Prendergast MLA	W. Crosbie	B. Kavanagh	?	P. Noonan	?	-	?
1905	16:0:5	2nd	Cr. G. M. Prendergast MLA	W. Crosbie	E. Freeman	?	J. Smith	?	-	?
1906	13:?:?	4th	Cr. G. M. Prendergast MLA	W. Crosbie	E. Freeman	?	J. Smith	?	-	?
1907	2:?:?	9th	Cr. G. M. Prendergast MLA	W. H. Ramsbottom	W. Jamieson	?	M. J. Londerigan	?	-	?
1908	4:?:?	9th	Cr. G. M. Prendergast MLA	T. B. Doherty	B. Allison	?	D. Kennedy/S. Rolent	?	-	?
1909	5:?:?	7th	Cr. G. M. Prendergast MLA	A. J. Curran	B. Allison	?	J. Johnson/W. Homan/P. Noonan	?	-	?
1910	16:1:3	1st	Cr. G. M. Prendergast MLA	A. J. Curran	R. L. Treloar	G. S. Johnson	G. S. Johnson	?	-	F. Caine 75
1911	14:?:?	3rd	Cr. G. M. Prendergast MLA	A. J. Curran	P. O'Niell	?	G. S. Johnson	?	-	?
1912	16:2:3	3rd	Cr C. Davidson	J. E. Heffernan	P. O'Niell	F. Jinks	S. Barker	?	-	?
1913	?:?:?	2nd	Cr C. Davidson	J. E. Heffernan	P. O'Niell	?	S. Barker/A. Treeloar	?	-	?
1914	16:?:?	1st	Cr C. Davidson	J. E. Heffernan	P. O'Niell	?	C. Hardy	G. Rawle	-	'Dingo' Moran 45
1915	15:0:0	1st	Cr C. Davidson	J. E. Heffernan	P. O'Niell	?	S. Barker	C. Hardy	-	?
1916	War Years	-	Cr C. Davidson	J. E. Heffernan	P. O'Niell	?	S. Barker	?	-	?
1917	War Years	-	Cr C. Davidson	J. E. Heffernan	P. O'Niell	?	S. Barker	?	-	?
1918	12:0:0	1st	Cr C. Davidson	J. E. Heffernan	P. O'Niell	?	S. Barker	?	-	T. Stevens 54
1919	18:0:2	2nd	Cr C. Davidson	J. E. Heffernan	P. O'Niell	?	S. Barker	?	-	?
1920	13:?:?	3rd	T. F. Jenyns	J. E. Heffernan	J. Kingdom	?	C. Hardy	?	-	?
1921	Disbanded	7th	Cr. B Deveney	J. E. Heffernan	J. Kingdom	?	S. Barker	?	-	?
1922	14:?:?	3rd	G. Ravenhall	J. E. Heffernan	J. Kingdom	G. Rawle	G. Rawle	?	-	?
1923	9:1:8	6th	G. Ravenhall	J. E. Heffernan	G. R. Barnett	?	C. Hall	?	-	?
1924	10:0:18	5th	A. J. Russell	S. C. Thomas	A. Stewart	N C Clarke	A. Giles	?	-	?

== VFL years ==
Year	W: D: L	Position	President	Chairman	Secretary	Treasurer	Coach	Captain	Vice-Captain	Best and Fairest	Leading Goalkicker
1925	5:0:12	10th	P. Sullivan	-	S. C. Thomas	A. Stewart	W. Eicke	W. Eicke	W. Smith	-	J. Woods 27
1926	0:1:17	12th	P. Sullivan	-	S. C. Thomas	A. Stewart	W. Eicke/C.S Thomas/G. Donnelly	W. Eicke/G. Donnelly	J. Lewis	-	F, Metcalf 26
1927	3:0:15	11th	P. Sullivan	-	S. C. Thomas	A. Stewart	S. Barker	S. Barker/C. Tyson	J. Lewis/W. Russ	-	C. Tyson 23
1928	5:0:13	11th	P. Sullivan	-	S. C. Thomas	A. Stewart	C. Tyson	C. Tyson	W. Russ/A. Trevaskis	-	J. Dowling 28
1929	1:0:17	12th	A. A. Callwell	-	J. F. Meere	A. Stewart	C. Tyson/P. Noonan	C. Tyson/A. Trevaskis	J. Morris	-	J. Dowling 28
1930	1:0:17	12th	A. A. Callwell	-	J. F. Meere	P. D. Clifford	J. Lewis	J. Lewis	C. Cameron	-	B. Matthews 29
1931	0:0:18	12th	A. A. Callwell	-	J. F. Meere	P. D. Clifford	N. Clarke/J. Pemberton	J. Lewis	C. Cameron	-	J. Lewis 25
1932	8:0:10	8th	A. A. Callwell	-	J. F. Meere	P. D. Clifford	R. Taylor	R. Taylor	C. Cameron	-	T. Fitzmaurice 62
1933	7:1:10	8th	A. A. Callwell	-	J. F. Meere	P. D. Clifford/J. J Finucane	R. Taylor	R. Taylor	C. Cameron	-	T. Fitzmaurice 60
1934	0:0:18	12th	A. A. Callwell	-	J. F. Adams	J. J Finucane	R. Taylor/T. Fitzmaurice	R. Taylor/T. Fitzmaurice	J. Lewis	-	T. Fitzmaurice 63
1935	0:1:17	12th	Dr. D. Berman	-	J. F. Adams	J. F. Meere	T. Fitzmaurice/P. Scnalon	T. Fitzmaurice/G.E Llewellyn	G. E. Llewellyn/N. Huggins	W Carter	J. Lewis 23
1936	4:0:14	11th	J. F. + Trainor	-	J. F. Adams	J. F. Meere	P. Scanlon	C. Gaudion	R.J. Adamson	C Skinner	D. Cassidy 48
1937	3:0:15	12th	J. F. + Trainor	-	J. F. Adams	J. F. Meere	P. Scanlon	C. Gaudion/ R.J. Adamson	R.J. Adamson/J. Smith	W. Carter	S. Anderson 18
1938	6:0:12	9th	J. F. + Trainor	-	J. F. Adams	J. F. Meere	K. Forbes	K. Forbes	R.J. Adamson	J. Cordner	S. Murray 88
1939	6:0:12	9th	J. F. + Trainor	-	J. F. Adams	J. F. Meere	K. Forbes	K. Forbes	E. Ellis	S. Dyer	S. Murray 78
1940	4:0:14	12th	J. F. + Trainor	-	J. F. Adams	J. F. Meere	L. Thomas/R.J. Adamson	L. Thomas/R.J. Adamson	J. Cordner/R.J. Adamson/W. Carter	R.J. Adamson	S. Murray 58
1941	6:0:12	9th	J. F. Trainor	-	J. F. Adams	J. F. Meere	R. McCaskell	J. Cordner/W. Findlay	N. F. Stubbs	G. Kennedy/W. Findlay	S. Murray 88
1942	4:0:10	9th	J. F. Trainor	-	J. F. Adams	J. F. Meere	R. McCaskell/W. Findlay	W. Findlay	J. Harrison	J. Allister	S. Murray 42
1943	5:1:9	9th	J. F. Trainor	-	J. F. Adams	J. F. Meere	W. Findlay	W. Findlay	S. Dyer	D. Kemp	B. Findlay 43
1944	10:0:8	6th	J. F. Trainor	-	J. F. Adams	J. F. Meere	R. McCaskell	H. D. O'Brien	J. Harrison	A. Crawford	B. Findlay 55
1945	13:0:8	4th	J. F. Trainor	-	J. F. Adams	J. F. Meere	R. McCaskell	H. D. O'Brien	W. Findlay	L. Foote	B. Findlay 49
1946	8:0:11	9th	J. F. Trainor	-	J. F. Adams	J. F. Meere	R. McCaskell	F. Fairweather	L. Foote	D. Condon	S. Dyer 55
1947	4:0:15	10th	J. F. Trainor	-	J. F. Adams	J. F. Meere/B. J. Geary	R. McCaskell	K. Dynon	D. Condon	K. McKenzie	S. Dyer 47
1948	8:0:11	8th	J. F. Trainor	-	J. F. Adams	E. H. Castles	W. Carter	L. Foote	K. Dynon	D. O’Brien	D. Condon 38
1949	14:0:7	3rd	J. F. Trainor	-	J. F. Adams	E. H. Castles	W. Carter	L. Foote	K. Dynon	L. Foote	J. Spencer 65
1950	14:0:7	2nd	J. F. Trainor	-	J. F. Adams	E. H. Castles	W. Carter	L. Foote	K. Dynon	L. Foote	J. Spencer 86
1951	7:0:11	9th	J. F. Trainor	-	J. F. Adams	E. H. Castles	W. Carter	L. Foote	K. Dynon	J. Spencer	J. Spencer 57
1952	9:0:10	7th	J. F. Trainor/J. F. Meere	-	J. F. Adams	E. H. Castles	W. Carter	K Dynon	E. Jarrard	J. McCorkell	J. Spencer 51
1953	9:0:9	7th	J. F. Meere	-	J. F. Adams	E. H. Castles	W. Carter	K Dynon	J. McCorkell/G. Marchesi	J. O’Halloran	G. Marchesi 49
1954	11:1:7	4th	A. V. Tobin	-	J. F. Adams/M. A. Tyrell	E. H. Castles	J. McCorkell	G. Marchesi	J. O'Halloran	J. Brady	J. Spencer 38
1955	3:0:15	11th	A. V. Tobin	-	M. A. Tyrell	W. Berry	J. McCorkell	V. Lawrence	J. Brady	B. Brooker	J. Spencer 68
1956	3:0:15	12th	A. V. Tobin	-	M. A. Tyrell	W. Berry	C. Gaudion	R. Brooker	J. Edwards	J. Edwards	J. Spencer 40
1957	8:0:10	8th	A. Marr	-	M. A. Tyrell	W. Berry	C. Gaudion	J. Brady	A. Mantello	B. Martyn	J. Dugdale 37
1958	12:0:8	4th	A. Marr	-	M. A. Tyrell	W. Berry	W. Carter	J. Brady	A. Mantello	A.J. Aylett	J. Dugdale 57
1959	10:0:8	6th	A. Marr	-	M. A. Tyrell	W. Berry	W. Carter	J. Brady	A. Mantello	A.J. Aylett	P. Schofield 47
1960	5:0:13	11th	A. Marr	-	M. A. Tyrell	W. Berry	W. Carter	A. Mantello	A.J. Aylett	A.J. Aylett	J. Dugdale 38
1961	4:1:13	12th	A. Marr	-	M. A. Tyrell/L. Schemnitz	W. Berry	W. Carter	A.J Aylett	N. Teasdale	L. Dwyer	J. Dugdale 47
1962	4:0:14	11th	A. Marr/J. F. Adams	-	L. Schemnitz	W. Berry/J. T. Hannam	W. Carter	A.J Aylett	N. Teasdale	B. Serong	J. Dugdale 44
1963	8:0:10	7th	J. F. Adams	-	L. Schemnitz	J. T. Hannam	A. Killigrew	A.J Aylett	N. Teasdale	N. Teasdale	J. Dugdale 30
1964	8:0:10	8th	J. F. Adams	-	L. Schemnitz	J. T. Hannam	A. Killigrew	A.J Aylett	N. Teasdale/J. Dugdale	N. Teasdale	J. Dugdale 46
1965	5:0:13	9th	J. F. Adams/A. M. Trainor	-	L. Schemnitz/R.L Joseph	J. T. Hannam	A. Killigrew	N. Teasdale	J. Dugdale	N. Teasdale	F. Goode 38
1966	7:1:10	7th	A. M. Trainor	-	R.L Joseph	J. T. Hannam	A. Killigrew	N. Teasdale	J. Dugdale	N. Teasdale	F. Goode 49
1967	7:1:10	8th	A. M. Trainor	-	R.L Joseph	J. T. Hannam	K. McKenzie	N. Teasdale	J. Dugdale	L. Dwyer	G. Farrant 26
1968	3:0:17	12th	A. M. Trainor	-	R.L Joseph	J. T. Hannam	K. McKenzie	J. Dugdale	L. Dyer	J. Dugdale	D. Farrant 35
1969	8:0:12	8th	A. M. Trainor	-	R.L Joseph	J. T. Hannam	K. McKenzie	J. Dugdale	P. Stewart	S. Kekovich	S. Kekovich 56
1970	4:0:18	12th	A. M. Trainor	-	R.L Joseph	J. T. Hannam	K. McKenzie	J. Dugdale	P. Stewart	B. Cable	D. Farrant 32
1971	5:1:6	9th	A. M. Trainor/A. Aylett	-	R.L Joseph	J. T. Hannam	B. Dixon	B. Goodingham	S. Kekovich	David Dench	S. Kekovich 35
1972	1:0:21	12th	A. Aylett	-	R.L Joseph	J. T. Hannam	B. Dixon	D. Dench	B. Goodingham	K. Montgomery	S. Kekovich/V. Doolan 19
1973	11:1:10	6th	A. Aylett	-	R.L Joseph	J. T. Hannam	R.D Barassi	B. Davis	D. Dench	B.Davis	D. Wade 73
1974	18:0:8	2nd	A. Aylett	-	R.L Joseph	J. T. Hannam	R.D Barassi	B. Davis	D. Dench	J. Rantall	D. Wade 103
1975	17:0:9	1st	A. Aylett	-	D. L. Robb	J. T. Hannam	R.D Barassi	B. Davis	D. Dench	B. Davis	D. Wade 47
1976	17:0:9	2nd	A. Aylett	-	D. L. Robb	J. T. Hannam	R.D Barassi	K. Greig	D. Dench	D. Dench	W. Schimmelbusch 43
1977	18:1:8	1st	L. D. Holyoak	-	R.L Joseph	J. T. Hannam	R.D Barassi	K. Greig	D. Dench	D. Dench	B. Croswell 42
1978	17:0:8	2nd	L. D. Holyoak	-	R.L Joseph	J. T. Hannam	R.D Barassi	K. Greig	D. Dench	M. Blight	M. Blight 77
1979	18:0:7	3rd	L. D. Holyoak	-	R.L Joseph	J. T. Hannam	R.D Barassi	K. Greig/W. Schimmelbusch	D. Dench	G. Dempsey	M. Blight 60
1980	14:1:8	5th	L. D. Holyoak/A. Mantello	R. G. Ansett	R.L Joseph	J. T. Hannam	R.D Barassi	W. Schimmelbusch	D. Dench	K. Greig	A. Briedis 53
1981	10:0:12	8th	-	R. G. Ansett	R.L Joseph	J. T. Hannam	M. Blight/B. Cable	W. Schimmelbusch	D. Dench	D. Dench	M. Blight 70
1982	15:0:9	4th	-	R. G. Ansett	R.L Joseph	J. T. Hannam	B. Cable	W. Schimmelbusch	D. Dench	R. Glendinning	M. Blight 103
1983	16:0:8	3rd	-	R. G. Ansett	R.L Joseph	J. T. Hannam	B. Cable	W. Schimmelbusch	R. Glendinning	R. Glendinning	J. Krakouer/P. Krakouer 44
1984	5:0:17	11th	-	R. G. Ansett	R.L Joseph	J. T. Hannam	B. Cable	W. Schimmelbusch	R. Glendinning	K. Hodgeman	D. McDonald 38
1985	14:1:9	4th	-	R. G. Ansett	R.L Joseph	J. T. Hannam	J. Kennedy	W. Schimmelbusch	-	M. Larkin	P. Krakouer 35
1986	12:0:10	7th	-	R. G. Ansett	R.L Joseph	J. T. Hannam	J. Kennedy	W. Schimmelbusch	-	J. Krakouer	J. Krakouer 32
1987	13:1:9	5th	-	R. G. Ansett	R.L Joseph	S. L. Reiger	J. Kennedy	W. Schimmelbusch	J. Law	M. Larkin	P. Krakouer 43
1988	7:1:14	11th	-	R. G. Ansett	R.L Joseph	S. L. Reiger	J. Kennedy	W. Schimmelbusch/J. Law	J. Law	M. Larkin	J. Krakouer 35
1989	9:0:13	9th	-	R. G. Ansett	R.L Joseph	S. L. Reiger	J. Kennedy	J. Law	-	M. Martyn	I. Fairley 28

== AFL years ==
Year	W-D-L	Position	President	Chairman	CEO	Treasurer	Coach	Captain	Vice-Captain	Best and Fairest	Leading Goalkicker
1990	12-0-10	6th	R. G. Ansett	A. W. Johnson	K. Montgomery	S.L. Rieger	W. Schimmelbusch	M. Larkin	B. Buckley	J. Longmire	J. Longmire (98)
1991	12-0-10	8th	R. G. Ansett	A. W. Johnson; R. P. Casey	K. Montgomery	S.L. Rieger	W. Schimmelbusch	M. Larkin	B. Buckley	C. Sholl; M. Martyn	J. Longmire (2) (91)
1992	7-0-15	12th	R. G. Ansett	R. P. Casey	K. Montgomery	S.L. Rieger	W. Schimmelbusch	M. Larkin	B. Buckley	W. Carey	J. Longmire (3) (64)
1993	13-0-8	5th	-	R. P. Casey	K. Montgomery	S.L. Rieger	D. Pagan	W. Carey	W. Schwass	W. Carey (2)	J. Longmire (4) (75)
1994	14-0-10	3rd	-	R. P. Casey	K. Montgomery	S.L. Rieger	D. Pagan	W. Carey	W. Schwass	W. Schwass	J. Longmire (5) (78)
1995	15-0-9	3rd	-	R. P. Casey	G. Miller	S.L. Rieger	D. Pagan	W. Carey	W. Schwass	W Schwass (2)	W. Carey (65)
1996	19-0-6	1st	-	R. P. Casey	G. Miller	S.L. Rieger	D. Pagan	W. Carey	W. Schwass	W. Carey	W. Carey (2) (88)
1997	14:0:11	4th	-	R. P. Casey	G. Miller	?	D. Pagan	W. Carey	W. Schwass	A. Stevens	B. Alison 43
1998	18:0:7	2nd	-	R. P. Casey	G. Miller	?	D. Pagan	W. Carey	A. Stevens	W. Carey	W. Carey 80
1999	20:0:5	1st	-	R. P. Casey	G. Miller	?	D. Pagan	W. Carey	A. Stevens	A. Stevens	W. Carey 76
2000	15:0:10	4th	-	R. P. Casey/A. Carter	G. Miller	?	D. Pagan	W. Carey	A. Stevens	P. Bell	W. Carey 69
2001	9:0:13	13th	-	A. Carter/A. Aylett	G. Miller/M. Easy	?	D. Pagan	W. Carey	A. Stevens	S. Grant	S. Rocca 48
2002	12:0:11	7th	-	A. Aylett	M. Easy/G. Walsh	?	D. Pagan	A. Stevens	G. Archer	A. Simpson	S. Rocca 50
2003	11:1:10	10th	-	A. Aylett	G. Walsh	?	D. Laidley	A. Stevens	G. Archer	B. Harvey	L. Harding 33
2004	10:0:12	10th	-	A. Aylett	G. Walsh	?	D. Laidley	A. Simpson	B. Harvey	B. Rawlings	S. Rocca 49
2005	13:0:10	7th	-	A. Aylett/G. Duff	G. Walsh	Rob Ewart	D. Laidley	A. Simpson	B. Harvey	B. Harvey	N. Thompson 52
2006	7:0:15	14th	-	G. Duff	G. Walsh/R. Aylett	Rob Ewart	D. Laidley	A. Simpson	?	B. Rawlings	N. Thompson 54
2007	15:0:10	3rd	-	G. Duff/J. Magowan/J. Brayshaw	R. Aylett	Rob Ewart	D. Laidley	A. Simpson	?	B. Harvey	C. Jones 43
2008	12:1:10	7th	J. Brayshaw	J. Brayshaw	E. Arocca	Rob Ewart/Cameron Vale	D. Laidley	A. Simpson	B. Harvey	B. Harvey	D. Hale 37
2009	7:1:14	13th	J. Brayshaw	J. Brayshaw	E. Arocca	Cameron Vale	D. Laidley/D. Crocker	B. Harvey	D. Petrie	A. Swallow	D. Petrie 27
2010	11:0:11	9th	J. Brayshaw	J. Brayshaw	E. Arocca	Cameron Vale	B. Scott	B. Harvey	D. Petrie	B. Harvey / B. Rawlings	Lindsay Thomas 29
2011	10:0:12	9th	J. Brayshaw	J. Brayshaw	E. Arocca	Cameron Vale	B. Scott	B. Harvey	D. Petrie	A. Swallow / D. Wells	D. Petrie 48
2012	10:0:12	8th	J. Brayshaw	J. Brayshaw	E. Arocca/Cameron Vale	Cameron Vale	B. Scott	B. Harvey	D. Petrie	A. Swallow	D. Petrie 57
2013	10:0:12	10th	J. Brayshaw	J. Brayshaw	Carl Dilena	Cameron Vale	B. Scott	A. Swallow	D. Petrie	S.Thompson / D. Wells	L. Thomas 53
2014	14:0:8	4th	J. Brayshaw	J. Brayshaw	Carl Dilena	Cameron Vale	B. Scott	A. Swallow	D. Petrie; J.Ziebell	B. Cunnington	D.Petrie 50
2015	13:0:9	4th	J. Brayshaw	J. Brayshaw	C. Dilena	Cameron Vale	B. Scott	A. Swallow	D. Petrie; J.Ziebell	T. Goldstein	D. Petrie & J. Waite 42
2016	12:0:10	8th	J. Brayshaw	J. Brayshaw	C. Dilena	C. Vale	B. Scott	A. Swallow	J. Ziebell	R. Tarrant	B. Brown 41
2017	6:0:16	15th	B. Buckley	B. Buckley	C. Dilena	P. Carlton	B. Scott	J. Ziebell	R. Tarrant; S. Higgins; J. Macmillan; A. Swallow	S. Higgins	B. Brown (2) 63
2018	12:0:10	9th	B. Buckley	B. Buckley	C. Dilena	P. Carlton	B. Scott	J. Ziebell	R. Tarrant; S. Higgins; J. Macmillan	S. Higgins (2)	B. Brown (3) 61
2019	10:0:12	12th	B. Buckley	B. Buckley	C. Dilena	P. Carlton	B. Scott; R. Shaw	J. Ziebell	R. Tarrant; S. Higgins; J. Macmillan	B. Cunnington (2)	B. Brown (4) 63
2020	3:0:14	17th	B. Buckley	B. Buckley	B. Amarfio	P. Carlton	R. Shaw	J. Ziebell	R. Tarrant; S. Higgins	L. McDonald	C. Zurhaar (18)
2021	4:1:17	18th	B. Buckley	B. Buckley	B. Amarfio	P. Carlton	D. Noble	J. Ziebell	L. McDonald; J. Simpkin	J. Simpkin	N. Larkey 42
2022	2–0–20	18th	S. Hood	S. Hood	B. Amarfio	P. Carlton	D. Noble; L. Adams	J. Ziebell	L. McDonald; J. Simpkin	J. Simpkin (2)	N. Larkey (2) 38
2023	3–0–20	17th	S. Hood	S. Hood	J. Watt	P. Carlton	A. Clarkson; B. Ratten	L. McDonald; J. Simpkin	N. Larkey	H. Sheezel	N. Larkey (3) 71
2024	3–0–20	17th	S. Hood	N. Dowling	J. Watt	C. Simmonds	A. Clarkson	L. McDonald; J. Simpkin	N. Larkey	L. Davies-Uniacke	N. Larkey (4) 46
2025	5–1–17	16th	S. Hood	N. Dowling	J. Watt	C. Simmonds	A. Clarkson	J. Simpkin	N. Larkey; H. Sheezel	H. Sheezel (2); T. Xerri	N. Larkey (5) 41
2026	TBA		S. Hood	N. Dowling	J. Watt	C. Simmonds	A. Clarkson	N. Larkey	H. Sheezel	TBA	

== Notes ==
- Dowling, G. (1997) The North Story - Official history of the North Melbourne Football Club
