= 2022 AFL season =

126th season of the Australian Football League (AFL)

2022 AFL premiership season
- Date: 16 March – 24 September 2022
- Teams: 18
- Premiers: Geelong; 10th premiership
- Runners-up: Sydney; 13th runners-up result
- Minor premiers: Geelong; 15th minor premiership
- Brownlow Medallist: Patrick Cripps (Carlton); 29 votes
- Coleman Medallist: Charlie Curnow (Carlton); 64 goals

Attendance
- Matches played: 207
- Total attendance: 7,392,391 (35,712 per match)
- Highest (H&A): 88,287 (round 23, Carlton v Collingwood)
- Highest (finals): 100,024 (grand final, Geelong v Sydney)

The 2022 AFL season was the 126th season of the Australian Football League (AFL), the highest-level senior men's Australian rules football competition in Australia, which was known as the Victorian Football League until 1989. The season featured eighteen clubs and ran from 16 March until 24 September, comprising a 22-game home-and-away season followed by a finals series featuring the top eight clubs.

The premiership was won by the Geelong Football Club for the tenth time, after defeating Sydney by 81 points in the 2022 AFL Grand Final.

== Background ==
The 2022 season was played during the third year of the COVID-19 pandemic and was the last season to be directly impacted by it. At the start of the season, the roll-out of Australia's vaccination program was almost complete with 95% of adults vaccinated to a two-dose standard and about 50% having received a booster; and across all states except for Western Australia, practically all social and interstate travel restrictions which had been in place through the latter half of 2021 had been lifted; Western Australia maintained some restrictions into the start of the season. Cases of the virus, particularly the Omicron variant which became dominant in December 2021, were widespread in the community for the first time in the pandemic; and confirmed cases and their close contacts were still required to test and isolate, although for shorter periods than earlier in the pandemic.

The main impacts of the pandemic to the AFL season were:

- The league implemented a vaccination policy requiring all players and football department staff to be vaccinated against COVID-19; equivalent requirements were implemented by some state governments. Two players – Liam Jones (Carlton) and Cam Ellis-Yolmen (Brisbane Lions) – resigned as a result of the mandate. The AFL's mandate was lifted in July, on a similar timeline to those of the state governments.
- A player top-up list and policy was put in place to cover the event of a substantial portion of a team being forced into isolation. Each club could nominate twenty top-up players from their affiliated state league and reserves systems; those players would become eligible to play if fewer than 28 main list players were available due for COVID-19 reasons, but would not otherwise be contracted to the club. The Western Australian government's tighter restrictions on isolation for close contacts early in the season meant that state's clubs saw greater COVID-19 impacts, and West Coast was the only club to draw on its top-up list, doing so twice.

Melbourne and the Western Bulldogs opened the season in a rematch of the previous season's grand final. Accor Stadium hosted its first premiership match since the 2016 Qualifying Final, with a Sydney Derby between Greater Western Sydney and Sydney fixtured for the ground in round one. The remainder of the fixture was released on 9 December, with only the first nine rounds released with dates and times for each match. The remainder of the fixture from round 10 was left as a floating fixture so as to prioritize the best matches for each round in prime-time slots, and dates were released progressively through the year. For the first time since 2001, some Friday nights had two scheduled games, aimed at taking games away from a less-favourable or an otherwise occupied timeslot later in the weekend; the broadcast times of the two matches overlapped partially.

== Club leadership ==
Club	Coach	Captain(s)	Vice-captain(s)	Leadership group	Ref.
Adelaide	Matthew Nicks	Rory Sloane		Tom Doedee, Ben Keays, Reilly O'Brien, Brodie Smith	
Brisbane Lions	Chris Fagan	Dayne Zorko	Harris Andrews	Darcy Gardiner, Ryan Lester, Lincoln McCarthy, Hugh McCluggage, Lachie Neale, Daniel Rich	
Carlton	Michael Voss	Patrick Cripps	Sam Walsh, Jacob Weitering		
Collingwood	Craig McRae	Scott Pendlebury	Taylor Adams, Jeremy Howe, Darcy Moore		
Essendon	Ben Rutten	Dyson Heppell	Zach Merrett	Andrew McGrath	
Fremantle	Justin Longmuir	Nat Fyfe		Andrew Brayshaw, David Mundy, Alex Pearce, Caleb Serong	
Geelong	Chris Scott	Joel Selwood	Patrick Dangerfield, Tom Stewart		
Gold Coast	Stuart Dew	Touk Miller, Jarrod Witts	Sam Collins	Noah Anderson, Nick Holman, Sean Lemmens, David Swallow	
Greater Western Sydney	Leon Cameron	Stephen Coniglio, Toby Greene, Josh Kelly		Phil Davis, Matt de Boer, Nick Haynes, Jacob Hopper, Lachie Whitfield	
Hawthorn	Sam Mitchell	Ben McEvoy	Jaeger O'Meara	James Sicily	
Melbourne	Simon Goodwin	Max Gawn	Jack Viney		
North Melbourne	David Noble	Jack Ziebell	Luke McDonald, Jy Simpkin	Aidan Corr, Ben Cunnington, Nick Larkey, Kayne Turner	
Port Adelaide	Ken Hinkley	Tom Jonas		Darcy Byrne-Jones, Ollie Wines	
Richmond	Damien Hardwick	Dylan Grimes, Toby Nankervis			
St Kilda	Brett Ratten	Jack Steele	Dougal Howard, Tim Membrey	Jarryn Geary, Callum Wilkie	
Sydney	John Longmire	Callum Mills, Luke Parker, Dane Rampe		Harry Cunningham, Lance Franklin, Josh Kennedy, Tom Papley	
West Coast	Adam Simpson	Luke Shuey	Jeremy McGovern, Nic Naitanui	Oscar Allen, Tom Barrass, Liam Duggan	
Western Bulldogs	Luke Beveridge	Marcus Bontempelli	Jack Macrae	Caleb Daniel, Taylor Duryea, Aaron Naughton	

== Pre-season ==
The 2022 AAMI Community Series was the Australian Football League (AFL) pre-season competition played before the home and away season. Each team played one match. All matches were televised live on Fox Footy as well as on the Kayo Sports app.

	2022 AAMI Community Series
Thursday, 3 March (7:20 pm)	Carlton 15.8 (98)	def.	Melbourne 14.9 (93)	Marvel Stadium (crowd: 5,765)	Report
Friday, 4 March (7:20 pm)	Western Bulldogs 11.14 (80)	def. by	Brisbane Lions 12.14 (86)	Marvel Stadium (crowd: 5,522)	Report
Saturday, 5 March (1:10 pm)	Hawthorn 9.15 (69)	def. by	Richmond 14.10 (94)	Devonport Oval (crowd: 8,412)	Report
Saturday, 5 March (4:10 pm)	Adelaide 11.8 (74)	def. by	Port Adelaide 17.9 (111)	Richmond Oval (crowd: TBA)	Report
Saturday, 5 March (7:10 pm)	Essendon 9.17 (71)	def. by	St Kilda 12.10 (82)	Marvel Stadium (crowd: 9,075)	Report
Sunday, 6 March (12:40 pm)	Greater Western Sydney 15.10 (100)	def.	Collingwood 8.11 (59)	GIANTS Stadium (crowd: TBA)	Report
Sunday, 6 March (4:20 pm)	Sydney 12.10 (82)	def.	North Melbourne 7.9 (51)	GIANTS Stadium (crowd: TBA)	Report
Sunday, 6 March (7:10 pm)	Fremantle 11.13 (79)	def.	West Coast 10.6 (66)	Optus Stadium (crowd: 0)	Report
Monday, 7 March (7:40 pm)	Gold Coast 13.17 (95)	def.	Geelong 11.6 (72)	Metricon Stadium (crowd: 2,486)	Report
The match between Hawthorn and Richmond was played in Devonport as a fundraiser and show of community support, following a bouncing castle tragedy that caused six deaths at the local Hillcrest Primary School in December 2021.; The game between Fremantle and West Coast was moved from Fremantle Community Bank Oval to Optus Stadium following the WA Government's changed COVID-19 restrictions on crowd numbers forced the change of venues but due to the change it was played without a crowd.

== Home-and-away season ==
=== Round 1 ===
	Round 1
Wednesday, 16 March (7:10 pm)	Melbourne 14.13 (97)	def.	Western Bulldogs 11.5 (71)	MCG (crowd: 58,002)	Report
Thursday, 17 March (7:25 pm)	Carlton 14.17 (101)	def.	Richmond 11.10 (76)	MCG (crowd: 72,179)	Report
Friday, 18 March (7:50 pm)	St Kilda 12.13 (85)	def. by	Collingwood 15.12 (102)	Marvel Stadium (crowd: 40,129)	Report
Saturday, 19 March (2:10 pm)	Geelong 20.18 (138)	def.	Essendon 11.6 (72)	MCG (crowd: 54,495)	Report
Saturday, 19 March (5:10 pm)	Greater Western Sydney 13.14 (92)	def. by	Sydney 17.10 (112)	Accor Stadium (crowd: 25,572)	Report
Saturday, 19 March (7:10 pm)	Brisbane Lions 11.14 (80)	def.	Port Adelaide 10.9 (69)	The Gabba (crowd: 25,100)	Report
Sunday, 20 March (1:10 pm)	Hawthorn 11.12 (78)	def.	North Melbourne 8.10 (58)	MCG (crowd: 38,279)	Report
Sunday, 20 March (3:40 pm)	Adelaide 12.10 (82)	def. by	Fremantle 11.17 (83)	Adelaide Oval (crowd: 28,186)	Report
Sunday, 20 March (4:40 pm)	West Coast 12.8 (80)	def. by	Gold Coast 16.11 (107)	Optus Stadium (crowd: 20,932)	Report
Carlton won its first game against Richmond since the 2013 Elimination Final, ending an eleven-game losing streak. The win was also its first in its annual Round 1 match against Richmond since 2012.

=== Round 2 ===
	Round 2
Thursday, 24 March (7:20 pm)	Western Bulldogs 13.12 (90)	def. by	Carlton 16.6 (102)	Marvel Stadium (crowd: 34,961)	Report
Friday, 25 March (7:50 pm)	Sydney 17.5 (107)	def.	Geelong 10.17 (77)	SCG (crowd: 36,578)	Report
Saturday, 26 March (1:45 pm)	Collingwood 15.10 (100)	def.	Adelaide 8.10 (58)	MCG (crowd: 36,843)	Report
Saturday, 26 March (4:35 pm)	Essendon 10.15 (75)	def. by	Brisbane Lions 15.7 (97)	Marvel Stadium (crowd: 30,631)	Report
Saturday, 26 March (7:10 pm)	Port Adelaide 7.14 (56)	def. by	Hawthorn 19.6 (120)	Adelaide Oval (crowd: 30,267)	Report
Saturday, 26 March (7:00 pm)	Gold Coast 10.9 (69)	def. by	Melbourne 12.10 (82)	Metricon Stadium (crowd: 8,280)	Report
Sunday, 27 March (1:10 pm)	North Melbourne 10.14 (74)	def.	West Coast 8.11 (59)	Marvel Stadium (crowd: 14,204)	Report
Sunday, 27 March (3:20 pm)	Richmond 16.13 (109)	def.	Greater Western Sydney 10.13 (73)	MCG (crowd: 28,813)	Report
Sunday, 27 March (5:20 pm)	Fremantle 8.7 (55)	def. by	St Kilda 9.11 (65)	Optus Stadium (crowd: 25,284)	Report
Lance Franklin (Sydney) became the 6th player in VFL/AFL history to kick 1,000 career goals.; West Coast made a VFL/AFL record 14 changes to its team between rounds 1 and 2, mostly from absences due to COVID-19 protocols, and fielded five players from its top-up list.

=== Round 3 ===
	Round 3
Thursday, 31 March (7:20 pm)	Western Bulldogs 9.17 (71)	def.	Sydney 9.6 (60)	Marvel Stadium (crowd: 24,327)	Report
Friday, 1 April (7:20 pm)	Melbourne 14.15 (99)	def.	Essendon 10.10 (70)	MCG (crowd: 44,503)	Report
Friday, 1 April (7:50 pm)	Adelaide 15.6 (96)	def.	Port Adelaide 13.14 (92)	Adelaide Oval (crowd: 39,190)	Report
Saturday, 2 April (4:35 pm)	Greater Western Sydney 12.11 (83)	def.	Gold Coast 8.9 (57)	Giants Stadium (crowd: 4,014)	Report
Saturday, 2 April (7:25 pm)	Collingwood 13.13 (91)	def. by	Geelong 16.8 (104)	MCG (crowd: 52,974)	Report
Saturday, 2 April (7:00 pm)	Brisbane Lions 23.18 (156)	def.	North Melbourne 7.6 (48)	The Gabba (crowd: 19,817)	Report
Sunday, 3 April (1:10 pm)	Carlton 11.8 (74)	def.	Hawthorn 11.7 (73)	MCG (crowd: 66,317)	Report
Sunday, 3 April (3:20 pm)	St Kilda 18.9 (117)	def.	Richmond 13.6 (84)	Marvel Stadium (crowd: 31,933)	Report
Sunday, 3 April (4:20 pm)	West Coast 7.5 (47)	def. by	Fremantle 15.12 (102)	Optus Stadium (crowd: 38,920)	Report
Jordan Dawson kicked a goal after the siren to win the Showdown for Adelaide.; Joel Selwood captained Geelong for the 227th time, surpassing Carlton's Stephen Kernahan record of most games as captain in VFL/AFL history.; The Brisbane Lions' 108-point win was their first win by 100 points or more since Round 16, 2007.

=== Round 4 ===
	Round 4
Thursday, 7 April (7:10 pm)	Port Adelaide 4.12 (36)	def. by	Melbourne 10.8 (68)	Adelaide Oval (crowd: 23,058)	Report
Friday, 8 April (7:50 pm)	Geelong 11.14 (80)	def.	Brisbane Lions 11.4 (70)	GMHBA Stadium (crowd: 20,505)	Report
Saturday, 9 April (2:40 pm)	Sydney 13.8 (86)	def.	North Melbourne 12.3 (75)	SCG (crowd: 22,307)	Report
Saturday, 9 April (4:35 pm)	Collingwood 10.14 (74)	def. by	West Coast 14.3 (87)	Marvel Stadium (crowd: 25,897)	Report
Saturday, 9 April (7:25 pm)	Richmond 15.9 (99)	def.	Western Bulldogs 7.19 (61)	MCG (crowd: 43,645)	Report
Saturday, 9 April (5:25 pm)	Fremantle 13.10 (88)	def.	Greater Western Sydney 8.6 (54)	Optus Stadium (crowd: 30,201)	Report
Sunday, 10 April (1:10 pm)	Essendon 15.13 (103)	def.	Adelaide 15.9 (99)	Marvel Stadium (crowd: 24,906)	Report
Sunday, 10 April (3:20 pm)	Hawthorn 10.13 (73)	def. by	St Kilda 22.10 (142)	MCG (crowd: 30,926)	Report
Sunday, 10 April (4:10 pm)	Gold Coast 13.14 (92)	def.	Carlton 8.14 (62)	Metricon Stadium (crowd: 14,349)	Report
Port Adelaide's score of 0.5 (5) in the first half against Melbourne was the first time the club's AFL team had been kept goalless in a half.

=== Round 5 ===
	Round 5 (Easter Round)
Thursday, 14 April (7:35 pm)	Brisbane Lions 15.8 (98)	def.	Collingwood 14.7 (91)	The Gabba (crowd: 32,312)	Report
Friday, 15 April (4:20 pm)	North Melbourne 11.5 (71)	def. by	Western Bulldogs 21.13 (139)	Marvel Stadium (crowd: 32,162)	Report
Friday, 15 April (7:40 pm)	West Coast 9.4 (58)	def. by	Sydney 18.13 (121)	Optus Stadium (crowd: 42,888)	Report
Saturday, 16 April (1:45 pm)	St Kilda 13.9 (87)	def.	Gold Coast 9.7 (61)	Marvel Stadium (crowd: 18,724)	Report
Saturday, 16 April (4:35 pm)	Adelaide 15.11 (101)	def.	Richmond 12.10 (82)	Adelaide Oval (crowd: 33,031)	Report
Saturday, 16 April (7:25 pm)	Melbourne 19.6 (120)	def.	Greater Western Sydney 7.11 (53)	MCG (crowd: 20,791)	Report
Sunday, 17 April (1:40 pm)	Carlton 14.10 (94)	def.	Port Adelaide 13.13 (91)	MCG (crowd: 33,433)	Report
Sunday, 17 April (4:40 pm)	Essendon 8.11 (59)	def. by	Fremantle 16.11 (107)	Marvel Stadium (crowd: 23,935)	Report
Monday, 18 April (3:20 pm)	Hawthorn 14.8 (92)	def.	Geelong 11.14 (80)	MCG (crowd: 48,030)	Report

=== Round 6 ===
	Round 6 (Anzac Day Weekend)
Friday, 22 April (7:50 pm)	Greater Western Sydney 8.12 (60)	def. by	St Kilda 10.17 (77)	Manuka Oval (crowd: 11,207)	Report
Saturday, 23 April (1:45 pm)	Western Bulldogs 9.8 (62)	def. by	Adelaide 8.15 (63)	Mars Stadium (crowd: 10,412)	Report
Saturday, 23 April (4:05 pm)	Port Adelaide 18.9 (117)	def.	West Coast 4.9 (33)	Adelaide Oval (crowd: 28,587)	Report
Saturday, 23 April (5:40 pm)	Fremantle 14.13 (97)	def.	Carlton 9.8 (62)	Optus Stadium (crowd: 42,302)	Report
Sunday, 24 April (1:10 pm)	North Melbourne 9.7 (61)	def. by	Geelong 17.19 (121)	Blundstone Arena (crowd: 8,663)	Report
Sunday, 24 April (4:10 pm)	Gold Coast 11.14 (80)	def. by	Brisbane Lions 21.6 (132)	Metricon Stadium (crowd: 14,897)	Report
Sunday, 24 April (7:25 pm)	Richmond 8.6 (54)	def. by	Melbourne 9.22 (76)	MCG (crowd: 70,334)	Report
Monday, 25 April (12:30 pm)	Hawthorn 10.8 (68)	def. by	Sydney 16.13 (109)	University of Tasmania Stadium (crowd: 14,107)	Report
Monday, 25 April (3:20 pm)	Essendon 12.10 (82)	def. by	Collingwood 15.3 (93)	MCG (crowd: 84,205)	Report
The crowd of 10,412 between Western Bulldogs and Adelaide is the largest ever AFL crowd at Mars Stadium.

=== Round 7 ===
	Round 7
Friday, 29 April (6:10 pm)	West Coast 8.8 (56)	def. by	Richmond 25.15 (165)	Optus Stadium (crowd: 39,430)	Report
Saturday, 30 April (1:45 pm)	Geelong 10.6 (66)	def. by	Fremantle 10.9 (69)	GMHBA Stadium (crowd: 20,136)	Report
Saturday, 30 April (1:40 pm)	Adelaide 8.6 (54)	def. by	Greater Western Sydney 17.11 (113)	Adelaide Oval (crowd: 31,811)	Report
Saturday, 30 April (4:35 pm)	Melbourne 13.13 (91)	def.	Hawthorn 11.15 (81)	MCG (crowd: 39,425)	Report
Saturday, 30 April (7:25 pm)	St Kilda 4.18 (42)	def. by	Port Adelaide 5.13 (43)	Cazalys Stadium (crowd: 6,645)	Report
Saturday, 30 April (7:25 pm)	Carlton 17.12 (114)	def.	North Melbourne 10.4 (64)	Marvel Stadium (crowd: 40,129)	Report
Sunday, 1 May (1:10 pm)	Collingwood 17.13 (115)	def.	Gold Coast 14.6 (90)	MCG (crowd: 28,916)	Report
Sunday, 1 May (3:20 pm)	Western Bulldogs 16.7 (103)	def.	Essendon 10.11 (71)	Marvel Stadium (crowd: 33,677)	Report
Sunday, 1 May (4:40 pm)	Sydney 13.11 (89)	def. by	Brisbane Lions 17.11 (113)	SCG (crowd: 30,110)	Report
West Coast suffered its worst ever defeat against Richmond, losing by 109 points. The loss was its worst defeat since Round 13, 2008.

=== Round 8 ===
	Round 8
Friday, 6 May (7:00 pm)	Port Adelaide 12.14 (86)	def.	Western Bulldogs 10.9 (69)	Adelaide Oval (crowd: 29,290)	Report
Friday, 6 May (6:40 pm)	Fremantle 15.12 (102)	def.	North Melbourne 3.6 (24)	Optus Stadium (crowd: 37,040)	Report
Saturday, 7 May (1:45 pm)	Richmond 17.11 (113)	def.	Collingwood 12.14 (86)	MCG (crowd: 64,481)	Report
Saturday, 7 May (1:45 pm)	Sydney 8.13 (61)	def. by	Gold Coast 10.15 (75)	SCG (crowd: 20,420)	Report
Saturday, 7 May (4:35 pm)	Greater Western Sydney 4.11 (35)	def. by	Geelong 12.16 (88)	Manuka Oval (crowd: 11,661)	Report
Saturday, 7 May (7:25 pm)	Essendon 16.12 (108)	def.	Hawthorn 11.15 (81)	Marvel Stadium (crowd: 33,042)	Report
Saturday, 7 May (7:25 pm)	Brisbane Lions 16.9 (105)	def.	West Coast 4.6 (30)	The Gabba (crowd: 19,331)	Report
Sunday, 8 May (1:10 pm)	Melbourne 14.9 (93)	def.	St Kilda 8.7 (55)	MCG (crowd: 35,767)	Report
Sunday, 8 May (4:40 pm)	Carlton 17.14 (116)	def.	Adelaide 10.8 (68)	Marvel Stadium (crowd: 25,376)	Report

=== Round 9 ===
	Round 9
Friday, 13 May (7:50 pm)	Collingwood 7.9 (51)	def. by	Western Bulldogs 14.15 (99)	Marvel Stadium (crowd: 44,029)	Report
Saturday, 14 May (1:45 pm)	Hawthorn 14.10 (94)	def. by	Richmond 17.15 (117)	MCG (crowd: 40,663)	Report
Saturday, 14 May (2:10 pm)	North Melbourne 6.10 (46)	def. by	Port Adelaide 17.13 (115)	Blundstone Arena (crowd: 5,114)	Report
Saturday, 14 May (4:35 pm)	St Kilda 13.12 (90)	def.	Geelong 11.14 (80)	Marvel Stadium (crowd: 32,517)	Report
Saturday, 14 May (7:25 pm)	Sydney 14.21 (105)	def.	Essendon 6.11 (47)	SCG (crowd: 27,464)	Report
Saturday, 14 May (7:10 pm)	Adelaide 9.12 (66)	def. by	Brisbane Lions 16.6 (102)	Adelaide Oval (crowd: 36,579)	Report
Sunday, 15 May (1:40 pm)	Gold Coast 10.9 (69)	def.	Fremantle 4.9 (33)	Metricon Stadium (crowd: 6,136)	Report
Sunday, 15 May (3:20 pm)	Greater Western Sydney 11.9 (75)	def. by	Carlton 15.15 (105)	Giants Stadium (crowd: 8,754)	Report
Sunday, 15 May (3:20 pm)	West Coast 5.8 (38)	def. by	Melbourne 16.16 (112)	Optus Stadium (crowd: 27,488)	Report

=== Round 10 ===
	Round 10 (Sir Doug Nicholls Round Week 1)
Friday, 20 May (7:50 pm)	Carlton 15.12 (102)	def.	Sydney 13.9 (87)	Marvel Stadium (crowd: 44,769)	Report
Saturday, 21 May (1:45 pm)	Geelong 11.16 (82)	def.	Port Adelaide 7.5 (47)	GMHBA Stadium (crowd: 18,721)	Report
Saturday, 21 May (1:45 pm)	Western Bulldogs 15.16 (106)	def.	Gold Coast 13.9 (87)	Mars Stadium (crowd: 6,040)	Report
Saturday, 21 May (4:35 pm)	North Melbourne 8.5 (53)	def. by	Melbourne 14.16 (100)	Marvel Stadium (crowd: 13,422)	Report
Saturday, 21 May (7:00 pm)	Adelaide 9.15 (69)	def. by	St Kilda 14.6 (90)	Adelaide Oval (crowd: 28,783)	Report
Saturday, 21 May (7:30 pm)	Richmond 11.14 (80)	def.	Essendon 7.6 (48)	MCG (crowd: 70,226)	Report
Sunday, 22 May (2:10 pm)	Greater Western Sydney 21.12 (138)	def.	West Coast 13.8 (86)	Giants Stadium (crowd: 5,057)	Report
Sunday, 22 May (3:20 pm)	Hawthorn 18.9 (117)	def.	Brisbane Lions 17.10 (112)	University of Tasmania Stadium (crowd: 12,007)	Report
Sunday, 22 May (3:20 pm)	Fremantle 6.8 (44)	def. by	Collingwood 12.8 (80)	Optus Stadium (crowd: 35,534)	Report
Melbourne across the two rounds of the Sir Doug Nicholls Round rebranded itself as Narrm, becoming the first club to adopt an Indigenous club name for the annual round.

=== Round 11 ===
	Round 11 (Sir Doug Nicholls Round Week 2)
Friday, 27 May (7:50 pm)	Sydney 16.10 (106)	def.	Richmond 15.10 (100)	SCG (crowd: 31,387)	Report
Saturday, 28 May (1:45 pm)	Geelong 15.7 (97)	def.	Adelaide 7.13 (55)	GMHBA Stadium (crowd: 19,051)	Report
Saturday, 28 May (1:45 pm)	Brisbane Lions 16.14 (110)	def.	Greater Western Sydney 15.6 (96)	The Gabba (crowd: 22,068)	Report
Saturday, 28 May (4:35 pm)	Melbourne 7.14 (56)	def. by	Fremantle 14.10 (94)	MCG (crowd: 29,812)	Report
Saturday, 28 May (5:30 pm)	West Coast 9.6 (60)	def. by	Western Bulldogs 25.11 (161)	Optus Stadium (crowd: 31,838)	Report
Saturday, 28 May (7:10 pm)	Gold Coast 18.13 (121)	def.	Hawthorn 7.12 (54)	TIO Stadium (crowd: 7,516)	Report
Sunday, 29 May (1:10 pm)	St Kilda 15.13 (103)	def.	North Melbourne 7.8 (50)	Marvel Stadium (crowd: 23,464)	Report
Sunday, 29 May (3:20 pm)	Collingwood 11.13 (79)	def.	Carlton 11.9 (75)	MCG (crowd: 80,627)	Report
Sunday, 29 May (4:10 pm)	Port Adelaide 9.12 (66)	def.	Essendon 6.14 (50)	Adelaide Oval (crowd: 25,877)	Report
Melbourne suffered its first loss since round 19, 2021, ending a 17 game winning streak.; West Coast suffered its worst ever defeat against the Western Bulldogs, losing by 101 points.

=== Round 12 ===
	Round 12
Friday, 3 June (7:50 pm)	Western Bulldogs 10.10 (70)	def. by	Geelong 12.11 (83)	Marvel Stadium (crowd: 34,370)	Report
Saturday, 4 June (1:15 pm)	Adelaide 13.10 (88)	def.	West Coast 8.9 (57)	Adelaide Oval (crowd: 22,859)	Report
Saturday, 4 June (4:05 pm)	Gold Coast 15.19 (109)	def.	North Melbourne 7.5 (47)	TIO Stadium (crowd: 5,523)	Report
Saturday, 4 June (7:25 pm)	Melbourne 9.7 (61)	def. by	Sydney 10.13 (73)	MCG (crowd: 32,753)	Report
Sunday, 5 June (2:10 pm)	Hawthorn 10.8 (68)	def. by	Collingwood 10.12 (72)	MCG (crowd: 43,939)	Report
Sunday, 5 June (3:20 pm)	Fremantle 15.9 (99)	def.	Brisbane Lions 13.7 (85)	Optus Stadium (crowd: 47,214)	Report
	Bye; Carlton, Essendon, Greater Western Sydney, Port Adelaide, Richmond, St Kilda

=== Round 13 ===
	Round 13 (Queen's Birthday Weekend)
Thursday, 9 June (7:20 pm)	Richmond 11.11 (77)	def.	Port Adelaide 10.5 (65)	MCG (crowd: 21,757)	Report
Friday, 10 June (7:50 pm)	Essendon 7.12 (54)	def. by	Carlton 12.8 (80)	MCG (crowd: 65,440)	Report
Saturday, 11 June (2:10 pm)	Fremantle 14.11 (95)	def.	Hawthorn 12.10 (82)	Optus Stadium (crowd: 39,428)	Report
Saturday, 11 June (7:25 pm)	Brisbane Lions 10.18 (78)	def.	St Kilda 8.9 (57)	The Gabba (crowd: 26,610)	Report
Sunday, 12 June (3:20 pm)	North Melbourne 7.11 (53)	def. by	Greater Western Sydney 15.12 (102)	Marvel Stadium (crowd: 13,742)	Report
Monday, 13 June (3:20 pm)	Collingwood 12.10 (82)	def.	Melbourne 8.8 (56)	MCG (crowd: 76,059)	Report
	Bye; Adelaide, Geelong, Gold Coast, Sydney, West Coast, Western Bulldogs
The crowd of 21,757 between Richmond and Port Adelaide is the lowest crowd for a Richmond home game without COVID-19 restrictions since Round 18, 2010.

=== Round 14 ===
	Round 14
Thursday, 16 June (7:20 pm)	Richmond 11.15 (81)	def.	Carlton 9.12 (66)	MCG (crowd: 50,741)	Report
Friday, 17 June (7:50 pm)	St Kilda 11.6 (72)	def. by	Essendon 15.17 (107)	Marvel Stadium (crowd: 33,274)	Report
Saturday, 18 Jun (1:15 pm)	Port Adelaide 12.10 (82)	def.	Sydney 8.11 (59)	Adelaide Oval (crowd: 30,445)	Report
Saturday, 18 Jun (2:35 pm)	West Coast 9.9 (63)	def. by	Geelong 12.9 (81)	Optus Stadium (crowd: 32,526)	Report
Saturday, 18 Jun (7:25 pm)	Greater Western Sydney 16.9 (105)	def. by	Western Bulldogs 19.11 (125)	Giants Stadium (crowd: 6,208)	Report
Sunday, 19 June (3:20 pm)	Gold Coast 18.8 (116)	def.	Adelaide 10.13 (73)	Metricon Stadium (crowd: 10,507)	Report
	Bye; Brisbane Lions, Collingwood, Fremantle, Hawthorn, Melbourne, North Melbourne

=== Round 15 ===
	Round 15
Thursday, 23 June (7:20 pm)	Melbourne 16.21 (117)	def.	Brisbane Lions 7.11 (53)	MCG (crowd: 37,728)	Report
Friday, 24 June (7:00 pm)	Western Bulldogs 19.11 (125)	def.	Hawthorn 12.11 (83)	Marvel Stadium (crowd: 32,505)	Report
Friday, 24 June (6:40 pm)	West Coast 16.11 (107)	def.	Essendon 14.13 (97)	Optus Stadium (crowd: 40,933)	Report
Saturday, 25 June (1:45 pm)	Carlton 12.9 (81)	def.	Fremantle 7.8 (50)	Marvel Stadium (crowd: 35,441)	Report
Saturday, 25 June (4:35 pm)	Geelong 13.11 (89)	def.	Richmond 13.8 (86)	MCG (crowd: 59,335)	Report
Saturday, 25 June (7:25 pm)	Sydney 12.11 (83)	def.	St Kilda 4.8 (32)	SCG (crowd: 31,513)	Report
Sunday, 26 June (1:10 pm)	North Melbourne 8.10 (58)	def. by	Adelaide 17.13 (115)	Blundstone Arena (crowd: 5,072)	Report
Sunday, 26 June (3:20 pm)	Collingwood 11.22 (88)	def.	Greater Western Sydney 12.5 (77)	MCG (crowd: 30,804)	Report
Sunday, 26 June (3:40 pm)	Port Adelaide 13.15 (93)	def.	Gold Coast 13.13 (91)	Adelaide Oval (crowd: 26,241)	Report

=== Round 16 ===
	Round 16
Thursday, 30 June (7:20 pm)	Brisbane Lions 16.12 (108)	def.	Western Bulldogs 9.13 (67)	The Gabba (crowd: 25,011)	Report
Friday, 1 July (7:50 pm)	Carlton 10.18 (78)	def. by	St Kilda 14.9 (93)	Marvel Stadium (crowd: 43,194)	Report
Saturday, 2 July (1:45 pm)	Essendon 15.5 (95)	def.	Sydney 12.14 (86)	MCG (crowd: 43,163)	Report
Saturday, 2 July (4:05 pm)	Adelaide 10.5 (65)	def. by	Melbourne 14.10 (94)	Adelaide Oval (crowd: 30,702)	Report
Saturday, 2 July (7:25 pm)	Geelong 21.18 (144)	def.	North Melbourne 5.2 (32)	GMHBA Stadium (crowd: 18,091)	Report
Saturday, 2 July (7:25 pm)	Gold Coast 8.14 (62)	def. by	Collingwood 9.13 (67)	Metricon Stadium (crowd: 16,027)	Report
Sunday, 3 July (2:10 pm)	Richmond 20.8 (128)	def.	West Coast 13.15 (93)	MCG (crowd: 39,391)	Report
Sunday, 3 July (3:20 pm)	Greater Western Sydney 11.6 (72)	def.	Hawthorn 7.8 (50)	Giants Stadium (crowd: 4,812)	Report
Sunday, 3 July (3:20 pm)	Fremantle 15.9 (99)	def.	Port Adelaide 14.7 (91)	Optus Stadium (crowd: 41,326)	Report
North Melbourne's 112-point loss to Geelong was its heaviest loss against Geelong since round 13, 1981.

=== Round 17 ===
	Round 17
Thursday, 7 July (7:20 pm)	Geelong 12.19 (91)	def.	Melbourne 9.9 (63)	GMHBA Stadium (crowd: 21,501)	Report
Friday, 8 July (7:50 pm)	Sydney 17.18 (120)	def.	Western Bulldogs 9.13 (67)	SCG (crowd: 26,226)	Report
Saturday, 9 July (1:45 pm)	Collingwood 13.10 (88)	def.	North Melbourne 12.9 (81)	MCG (crowd: 45,039)	Report
Saturday, 9 July (4:35 pm)	Gold Coast 14.10 (94)	def.	Richmond 13.14 (92)	Metricon Stadium (crowd: 18,031)	Report
Saturday, 9 July (7:25 pm)	St Kilda 10.10 (70)	def. by	Fremantle 17.9 (111)	Marvel Stadium (crowd: 21,652)	Report
Saturday, 9 July (7:00 pm)	Port Adelaide 12.12 (84)	def.	Greater Western Sydney 3.11 (29)	Adelaide Oval (crowd: 24,744)	Report
Sunday, 10 July (1:10 pm)	Brisbane Lions 13.12 (90)	def. by	Essendon 15.10 (100)	The Gabba (crowd: 29,101)	Report
Sunday, 10 July (3:20 pm)	Hawthorn 13.8 (86)	def.	Adelaide 8.6 (54)	Marvel Stadium (crowd: 18,833)	Report
Sunday, 10 July (2:40 pm)	West Coast 8.5 (53)	def. by	Carlton 17.14 (116)	Optus Stadium (crowd: 43,359)	Report
Noah Anderson (Gold Coast) kicked a goal after the siren to defeat Richmond after trailing by 40 points in the 3rd quarter.

=== Round 18 ===
	Round 18
Friday, 15 July (7:50 pm)	Western Bulldogs 13.6 (84)	def.	St Kilda 7.14 (56)	Marvel Stadium (crowd: 25,981)	Report
Saturday, 16 July (1:15 pm)	Adelaide 13.8 (86)	def. by	Collingwood 14.7 (91)	Adelaide Oval (crowd: 30,110)	Report
Saturday, 16 July (1:45 pm)	Greater Western Sydney 9.5 (59)	def. by	Brisbane Lions 15.9 (99)	Manuka Oval (crowd: 9,010)	Report
Saturday, 16 July (4:35 pm)	North Melbourne 14.8 (92)	def.	Richmond 11.22 (88)	Marvel Stadium (crowd: 22,666)	Report
Saturday, 16 July (7:25 pm)	Carlton 8.7 (55)	def. by	Geelong 12.13 (85)	MCG (crowd: 68,208)	Report
Saturday, 16 July (5:30 pm)	Fremantle 9.11 (65)	def. by	Sydney 11.16 (82)	Optus Stadium (crowd: 46,596)	Report
Sunday, 17 July (1:10 pm)	Hawthorn 15.12 (102)	def.	West Coast 12.5 (77)	MCG (crowd: 22,598)	Report
Sunday, 17 July (2:50 pm)	Melbourne 12.11 (83)	def.	Port Adelaide 10.9 (69)	TIO Traeger Park (crowd: 6,312)	Report
Sunday, 17 July (4:40 pm)	Essendon 14.19 (103)	def.	Gold Coast 8.7 (55)	Marvel Stadium (crowd: 23,484)	Report
Rory Laird (Adelaide) laid 20 tackles against Collingwood, the most ever recorded in any match.; North Melbourne ended a 14-match losing streak with its win against Richmond.

=== Round 19 ===
	Round 19
Friday, 22 July (7:50 pm)	Richmond 7.10 (52)	drew with	Fremantle 7.10 (52)	Marvel Stadium (crowd: 23,549)	Report
Saturday, 23 July (1:45 pm)	North Melbourne 11.9 (75)	def. by	Hawthorn 19.7 (121)	Blundstone Arena (crowd: 9,713)	Report
Saturday, 23 July (1:45 pm)	Sydney 17.16 (118)	def.	Adelaide 12.13 (85)	SCG (crowd: 25,084)	Report
Saturday, 23 July (4:05 pm)	Port Adelaide 14.10 (94)	def. by	Geelong 16.10 (106)	Adelaide Oval (crowd: 30,937)	Report
Saturday, 23 July (7:10 pm)	Brisbane Lions 16.14 (110)	def.	Gold Coast 14.9 (93)	The Gabba (crowd: 21,467)	Report
Saturday, 23 July (7:25 pm)	Western Bulldogs 17.8 (110)	def.	Melbourne 15.10 (100)	Marvel Stadium (crowd: 26,501)	Report
Sunday, 24 July (1:10 pm)	Carlton 13.12 (90)	def.	Greater Western Sydney 8.6 (54)	Marvel Stadium (crowd: 30,295)	Report
Sunday, 24 July (3:20 pm)	Collingwood 12.8 (80)	def.	Essendon 11.10 (76)	MCG (crowd: 72,402)	Report
Sunday, 24 July (2:40 pm)	West Coast 10.2 (62)	def. by	St Kilda 14.6 (90)	Optus Stadium (crowd: 35,665)	Report
Noah Cumberland (Richmond) marked the ball on the 50-metre line, but played on as the siren sounded, resulting in a draw with Fremantle.; Jamie Elliott (Collingwood) kicked a goal after the siren to defeat Essendon.

=== Round 20 ===
	Round 20
Friday, 29 July (6:10 pm)	Fremantle 5.9 (39)	def. by	Melbourne 12.13 (85)	Optus Stadium (crowd: 46,313)	Report
Saturday, 30 July (1:45 pm)	Collingwood 13.10 (88)	def.	Port Adelaide 12.10 (82)	MCG (crowd: 40,716)	Report
Saturday, 30 July (2:10 pm)	Sydney 17.10 (112)	def.	Greater Western Sydney 5.9 (39)	SCG (crowd: 31,916)	Report
Saturday, 30 July (4:35 pm)	St Kilda 10.15 (75)	def.	Hawthorn 9.9 (63)	Marvel Stadium (crowd: 25,348)	Report
Saturday, 30 July (7:25 pm)	Geelong 14.10 (94)	def.	Western Bulldogs 9.12 (66)	GMHBA Stadium (crowd: 22,106)	Report
Saturday, 30 July (7:00 pm)	Adelaide 12.12 (84)	def.	Carlton 8.7 (55)	Adelaide Oval (crowd: 35,666)	Report
Sunday, 31 July (1:10 pm)	Gold Coast 16.11 (107)	def.	West Coast 16.8 (104)	Metricon Stadium (crowd: 8,282)	Report
Sunday, 31 July (3:20 pm)	Richmond 15.14 (104)	def.	Brisbane Lions 14.13 (97)	MCG (crowd: 39,056)	Report
Sunday, 31 July (4:40 pm)	Essendon 17.12 (114)	def.	North Melbourne 9.12 (66)	Marvel Stadium (crowd: 29,549)	Report

=== Round 21 ===
	Round 21
Friday, 5 August (7:50 pm)	Melbourne 13.11 (89)	def. by	Collingwood 15.6 (96)	MCG (crowd: 70,956)	Report
Saturday, 6 August (1:45 pm)	Hawthorn 10.10 (70)	def.	Gold Coast 8.15 (63)	University of Tasmania Stadium (crowd: 9,022)	Report
Saturday, 6 August (2:10 pm)	Greater Western Sydney 14.12 (96)	def.	Essendon 10.9 (69)	Giants Stadium (crowd: 7,772)	Report
Saturday, 6 August (4:35 pm)	Western Bulldogs 11.12 (78)	def. by	Fremantle 14.11 (95)	Marvel Stadium (crowd: 24,130)	Report
Saturday, 6 August (7:25 pm)	Geelong 17.8 (110)	def.	St Kilda 10.5 (65)	GMHBA Stadium (crowd: 20,583)	Report
Saturday, 6 August (7:10 pm)	Port Adelaide 10.11 (71)	def. by	Richmond 16.13 (109)	Adelaide Oval (crowd: 27,091)	Report
Sunday, 7 August (1:10 pm)	North Melbourne 13.10 (88)	def. by	Sydney 18.18 (126)	Marvel Stadium (crowd: 19,091)	Report
Sunday, 7 August (3:20 pm)	Brisbane Lions 17.12 (114)	def.	Carlton 12.9 (81)	The Gabba (crowd: 31,011)	Report
Sunday, 7 August (2:10 pm)	West Coast 13.8 (86)	def. by	Adelaide 16.6 (102)	Optus Stadium (crowd: 50,117)	Report
Josh Kennedy (West Coast) played his last AFL game and in doing so kicked 8 goals against Adelaide.

=== Round 22 ===
	Round 22
Friday, 12 August (7:50 pm)	St Kilda 9.12 (66)	def. by	Brisbane Lions 12.9 (81)	Marvel Stadium (crowd: 22,211)	Report
Saturday, 13 August (1:45 pm)	Western Bulldogs 9.8 (62)	def.	Greater Western Sydney 8.9 (57)	Marvel Stadium (crowd: 18,301)	Report
Saturday, 13 August (1:40 pm)	Adelaide 15.13 (103)	def.	North Melbourne 10.14 (74)	Adelaide Oval (crowd: 28,802)	Report
Saturday, 13 August (4:35 pm)	Gold Coast 9.5 (59)	def. by	Geelong 18.11 (119)	Metricon Stadium (crowd: 14,728)	Report
Saturday, 13 August (7:25 pm)	Melbourne 11.13 (79)	def.	Carlton 10.14 (74)	MCG (crowd: 55,705)	Report
Saturday, 13 August (5:40 pm)	Fremantle 9.17 (71)	def.	West Coast 7.5 (47)	Optus Stadium (crowd: 53,816)	Report
Sunday, 14 August (1:10 pm)	Richmond 20.8 (128)	def.	Hawthorn 9.13 (67)	MCG (crowd: 59,338)	Report
Sunday, 14 August (3:20 pm)	Sydney 11.11 (77)	def.	Collingwood 7.8 (50)	SCG (crowd: 44,659)	Report
Sunday, 14 August (4:40 pm)	Essendon 9.8 (62)	def. by	Port Adelaide 23.8 (146)	Marvel Stadium (crowd: 20,568)	Report
The crowd of 44,659 between Sydney and Collingwood is the highest crowd for a Sydney home game at the SCG, excluding finals, since Round 22, 1997.

=== Round 23 ===
	Round 23
Friday, 19 August (7:50 pm)	Brisbane Lions 8.9 (57)	def. by	Melbourne 18.7 (115)	The Gabba (crowd: 32,172)	Report
Saturday, 20 August (1:45 pm)	Greater Western Sydney 10.9 (69)	def. by	Fremantle 13.11 (89)	Manuka Oval (crowd: 7,338)	Report
Saturday, 20 August (2:10 pm)	North Melbourne 6.11 (47)	def. by	Gold Coast 16.18 (114)	Marvel Stadium (crowd: 14,196)	Report
Saturday, 20 August (4:35 pm)	Geelong 19.17 (131)	def.	West Coast 7.4 (46)	GMHBA Stadium (crowd: 21,098)	Report
Saturday, 20 August (7:25 pm)	Essendon 11.9 (75)	def. by	Richmond 21.15 (141)	MCG (crowd: 58,366)	Report
Saturday, 20 August (7:00 pm)	Port Adelaide 16.15 (111)	def.	Adelaide 7.13 (55)	Adelaide Oval (crowd: 50,090)	Report
Sunday, 21 August (1:10 pm)	Hawthorn 10.4 (64)	def. by	Western Bulldogs 12.15 (87)	University of Tasmania Stadium (crowd: 13,105)	Report
Sunday, 21 August (3:20 pm)	Carlton 10.14 (74)	def. by	Collingwood 11.9 (75)	MCG (crowd: 88,287)	Report
Sunday, 21 August (4:40 pm)	St Kilda 11.8 (74)	def. by	Sydney 13.10 (88)	Marvel Stadium (crowd: 23,344)	Report

== Ladder ==
Pos	Team	Pld	W	L	D	PF	PA	PP	Pts	Qualification
1	Geelong (P)	22	18	4	0	2146	1488	144.2	72	Finals series
2	Melbourne	22	16	6	0	1936	1483	130.5	64	Finals series
3	Sydney	22	16	6	0	2067	1616	127.9	64	Finals series
4	Collingwood	22	16	6	0	1839	1763	104.3	64	Finals series
5	Fremantle	22	15	6	1	1739	1486	117.0	62	Finals series
6	Brisbane Lions	22	15	7	0	2147	1799	119.3	60	Finals series
7	Richmond	22	13	8	1	2165	1780	121.6	54	Finals series
8	Western Bulldogs	22	12	10	0	1973	1812	108.9	48	Finals series
9	Carlton	22	12	10	0	1857	1714	108.3	48	
10	St Kilda	22	11	11	0	1703	1715	99.3	44	
11	Port Adelaide	22	10	12	0	1806	1638	110.3	40	
12	Gold Coast	22	10	12	0	1871	1820	102.8	40	
13	Hawthorn	22	8	14	0	1787	1991	89.8	32	
14	Adelaide	22	8	14	0	1721	1986	86.7	32	
15	Essendon	22	7	15	0	1737	2087	83.2	28	
16	Greater Western Sydney	22	6	16	0	1631	1927	84.6	24	
17	West Coast	22	2	20	0	1429	2389	59.8	8	
18	North Melbourne	22	2	20	0	1337	2397	55.8	8	

Source: afl.com.au
Rules for classification: 1) points; 2) percentage; 3) number of points for.
(P) Premiers

== Progression by round ==
- Numbers highlighted in green indicates the team finished the round inside the top 8.
- Numbers highlighted in blue indicates the team finished in first place on the ladder in that round.
- Numbers highlighted in red indicates the team finished in last place on the ladder in that round.
- Underlined numbers indicates the team did not play during that round, either due to a bye or a postponed game.
- Subscript numbers indicate ladder position at round's end.

Points by round
Team ╲ Round	1	2	3	4	5	6	7	8	9	10	11	12	13	14	15	16	17	18	19	20	21	22	23
Geelong	4_{1}	4_{7}	8_{7}	12_{5}	12_{7}	16_{6}	16_{7}	20_{5}	20_{7}	24_{6}	28_{6}	32_{4}	32_{5}	36_{4}	40_{2}	44_{2}	48_{1}	52_{1}	56_{1}	60_{1}	64_{1}	68_{1}	72_{1}
Melbourne	4_{2}	8_{4}	12_{2}	16_{1}	20_{1}	24_{1}	28_{1}	32_{1}	36_{1}	40_{1}	40_{1}	40_{1}	40_{2}	40_{2}	44_{1}	48_{1}	48_{2}	52_{2}	52_{2}	56_{2}	56_{3}	60_{3}	64_{2}
Sydney	4_{6}	8_{3}	8_{8}	12_{6}	16_{7}	20_{4}	20_{5}	20_{6}	24_{5}	24_{7}	28_{7}	32_{6}	32_{7}	32_{7}	36_{6}	36_{8}	40_{7}	44_{6}	48_{6}	52_{4}	56_{4}	60_{2}	64_{3}
Collingwood	4_{7}	8_{2}	8_{6}	8_{8}	8_{9}	12_{8}	16_{8}	16_{9}	16_{11}	20_{10}	24_{10}	28_{8}	32_{8}	32_{9}	36_{7}	40_{6}	44_{6}	48_{5}	52_{4}	56_{3}	60_{2}	60_{5}	64_{4}
Fremantle	4_{9}	4_{12}	8_{5}	12_{3}	16_{2}	20_{2}	24_{3}	28_{2}	28_{3}	28_{4}	32_{3}	36_{3}	40_{3}	40_{3}	40_{4}	44_{4}	48_{3}	48_{4}	50_{5}	50_{6}	54_{6}	58_{6}	62_{5}
Brisbane Lions	4_{8}	8_{5}	12_{1}	12_{2}	16_{3}	20_{3}	24_{2}	28_{3}	32_{2}	32_{2}	36_{2}	36_{2}	40_{1}	40_{1}	40_{3}	44_{3}	44_{4}	48_{3}	52_{3}	52_{5}	56_{5}	60_{4}	60_{6}
Richmond	0_{14}	4_{9}	4_{11}	8_{10}	8_{11}	8_{12}	12_{9}	16_{8}	20_{8}	24_{8}	24_{9}	24_{10}	28_{9}	32_{6}	32_{9}	36_{7}	36_{8}	36_{8}	38_{10}	42_{9}	46_{8}	50_{7}	54_{7}
Western Bulldogs	0_{17}	0_{13}	4_{12}	4_{14}	8_{10}	8_{11}	12_{10}	12_{10}	16_{9}	20_{9}	24_{8}	24_{9}	24_{10}	28_{10}	32_{8}	32_{10}	32_{10}	36_{9}	40_{8}	40_{10}	40_{10}	44_{9}	48_{8}
Carlton	4_{5}	8_{6}	12_{3}	12_{7}	16_{6}	16_{7}	20_{6}	24_{4}	28_{4}	32_{3}	32_{5}	32_{7}	36_{4}	36_{5}	40_{5}	40_{5}	44_{5}	44_{7}	48_{7}	48_{7}	48_{7}	48_{8}	48_{9}
St Kilda	0_{12}	4_{11}	8_{9}	12_{4}	16_{4}	20_{5}	20_{4}	20_{7}	24_{6}	28_{5}	32_{4}	32_{5}	32_{6}	32_{8}	32_{10}	36_{9}	36_{9}	36_{10}	40_{9}	44_{8}	44_{9}	44_{10}	44_{10}
Port Adelaide	0_{11}	0_{18}	0_{16}	0_{18}	0_{18}	4_{14}	8_{13}	12_{11}	16_{10}	16_{11}	20_{11}	20_{12}	20_{12}	24_{12}	28_{12}	28_{12}	32_{12}	32_{11}	32_{11}	32_{12}	32_{12}	36_{11}	40_{11}
Gold Coast	4_{4}	4_{8}	4_{10}	8_{9}	8_{12}	8_{13}	8_{14}	12_{13}	16_{12}	16_{12}	20_{12}	24_{11}	24_{11}	28_{11}	28_{11}	28_{11}	32_{11}	32_{12}	32_{12}	36_{11}	36_{11}	36_{12}	40_{12}
Hawthorn	4_{3}	8_{1}	8_{4}	8_{11}	12_{8}	12_{9}	12_{11}	12_{12}	12_{13}	16_{13}	16_{13}	16_{13}	16_{14}	16_{15}	16_{15}	16_{15}	20_{14}	24_{13}	28_{13}	28_{13}	32_{13}	32_{13}	32_{13}
Adelaide	0_{10}	0_{15}	4_{14}	4_{12}	8_{13}	12_{10}	12_{12}	12_{14}	12_{14}	12_{15}	12_{15}	16_{14}	16_{15}	16_{14}	20_{13}	20_{14}	20_{15}	20_{16}	20_{16}	24_{15}	28_{15}	32_{14}	32_{14}
Essendon	0_{18}	0_{17}	0_{18}	4_{16}	4_{15}	4_{16}	4_{16}	8_{16}	8_{16}	8_{16}	8_{16}	8_{16}	8_{16}	12_{16}	12_{16}	16_{16}	20_{16}	24_{14}	24_{14}	28_{14}	28_{14}	28_{15}	28_{15}
Greater Western Sydney	0_{13}	0_{16}	4_{13}	4_{13}	4_{14}	4_{15}	8_{15}	8_{15}	8_{15}	12_{14}	12_{14}	12_{15}	16_{13}	16_{13}	16_{14}	20_{13}	20_{13}	20_{15}	20_{15}	20_{16}	24_{16}	24_{16}	24_{16}
West Coast	0_{15}	0_{14}	0_{17}	4_{15}	4_{16}	4_{17}	4_{18}	4_{18}	4_{18}	4_{18}	4_{18}	4_{18}	4_{18}	4_{18}	8_{17}	8_{17}	8_{17}	8_{17}	8_{17}	8_{17}	8_{17}	8_{17}	8_{17}
North Melbourne	0_{16}	4_{10}	4_{15}	4_{17}	4_{17}	4_{18}	4_{17}	4_{17}	4_{17}	4_{17}	4_{17}	4_{17}	4_{17}	4_{17}	4_{18}	4_{18}	4_{18}	8_{18}	8_{18}	8_{18}	8_{18}	8_{18}	8_{18}

Source: AFL Tables

== Finals series ==
Qualifying and elimination finals
3 Sep, MCG
1	Geelong	11.12 (78)
4	Collingwood	10.12 (72)
3 Sep, Optus Stadium
5	Fremantle	11.7 (73)
8	Western Bulldogs	8.12 (60)
1 Sep, The Gabba
6	Brisbane Lions	16.10 (106)
7	Richmond	16.8 (104)
2 Sep, MCG
2	Melbourne	10.9 (69)
3	Sydney	14.7 (91)

Semi-finals
10 Sep, MCG
Collingwood	11.13 (79)
Fremantle	9.5 (59)
9 Sep, MCG
Melbourne	11.13 (79)
Brisbane Lions	14.8 (92)

Preliminary finals
16 Sep, MCG
Geelong	18.12 (120)
Brisbane Lions	7.7 (49)
17 Sep, SCG
Sydney	14.11 (95)
Collingwood	14.10 (94)

Grand final
24 Sep, MCG
Geelong	20.13 (133)
Sydney	8.4 (52)

=== Finals week 1 ===
	Qualifying finals
QF2: Friday, 2 September (7:50 pm)	Melbourne 10.9 (69)	def. by	Sydney 14.7 (91)	MCG (crowd: 78,377)	Report
QF1: Saturday, 3 September (4:35 pm)	Geelong 11.12 (78)	def.	Collingwood 10.12 (72)	MCG (crowd: 91,525)	Report

	Elimination finals
EF2: Thursday, 1 September (7:20 pm)	Brisbane Lions 16.10 (106)	def.	Richmond 16.8 (104)	The Gabba (crowd: 35,013)	Report
EF1: Saturday, 3 September (6:10 pm)	Fremantle 11.7 (73)	def.	Western Bulldogs 8.12 (60)	Optus Stadium (crowd: 58,982)	Report
The crowd of 58,982 for the first elimination final between Fremantle and Western Bulldogs is the highest crowd between the two sides.

=== Finals week 2 ===
	Semi-finals
SF2: Friday, 9 September (7:50 pm)	Melbourne 11.13 (79)	def. by	Brisbane Lions 14.8 (92)	MCG (crowd: 62,162)	Report
SF1: Saturday, 10 September (7:25 pm)	Collingwood 11.13 (79)	def.	Fremantle 9.5 (59)	MCG (crowd: 90,612)	Report
The Brisbane Lions' win over Melbourne was their first finals win at the Melbourne Cricket Ground since 2004.

=== Finals week 3 ===
	Preliminary finals
PF1: Friday, 16 September (7:50 pm)	Geelong 18.12 (120)	def.	Brisbane Lions 7.7 (49)	MCG (crowd: 77,677)	Report
PF2: Saturday, 17 September (4:45 pm)	Sydney 14.11 (95)	def.	Collingwood 14.10 (94)	SCG (crowd: 45,608)	Report

=== Grand final ===
	Grand final
Saturday, 24 September (2:30 pm)	Geelong 20.13 (133)	def.	Sydney 8.4 (52)	MCG (crowd: 100,024)

== Win–loss table ==
+	Win		Qualified for finals
−	Loss		Eliminated
	Draw	X	Bye

Team	Home-and-away season																							Ladder	Finals series			
Team	1	2	3	4	5	6	7	8	9	10	11	12	13	14	15	16	17	18	19	20	21	22	23	Ladder	F1	F2	F3	GF
Adelaide	FRE −1	COL −42	PA +4	ESS −4	RIC +19	WB +1	GWS −59	CAR −48	BL −36	STK −21	GEE −42	WC +31	X	GC −43	NM +57	MEL −29	HAW −32	COL −5	SYD −33	CAR +29	WC +16	NM +29	PA −56	14 (8–14–0)				
Brisbane Lions	PA +11	ESS +22	NM +108	GEE −10	COL +7	GC +52	SYD +24	WC +75	ADE +36	HAW −5	GWS +14	FRE −14	STK +21	X	MEL −64	WB +41	ESS −10	GWS +40	GC +17	RIC −7	CAR +33	STK +15	MEL −58	6 (15–7–0)	RIC +2	MEL +13	GEE −71	
Carlton	RIC +25	WB +12	HAW +1	GC −30	PA +3	FRE −35	NM +50	ADE +48	GWS +30	SYD +15	COL −4	X	ESS +26	RIC −15	FRE +31	STK −15	WC +63	GEE −30	GWS +36	ADE −29	BL −33	MEL −5	COL −1	9 (12–10–0)				
Collingwood	STK +17	ADE +42	GEE −13	WC −13	BL −7	ESS +11	GC +25	RIC −27	WB −48	FRE +36	CAR +4	HAW +4	MEL +26	X	GWS +11	GC +5	NM +7	ADE +5	ESS +4	PA +6	MEL +7	SYD −27	CAR +1	4 (16–6–0)	GEE −6	FRE +20	SYD −1	
Essendon	GEE −66	BL −22	MEL −29	ADE +4	FRE −48	COL −11	WB −32	HAW +27	SYD −58	RIC −32	PA −16	X	CAR −26	STK +35	WC −10	SYD +9	BL +10	GC +48	COL −4	NM +48	GWS −27	PA −84	RIC −66	15 (7–15–0)				
Fremantle	ADE +1	STK −10	WC +55	GWS +34	ESS +48	CAR +35	GEE +3	NM +78	GC −36	COL −36	MEL +38	BL +14	HAW +13	X	CAR −31	PA +8	STK +41	SYD −17	RIC; 0	MEL −46	WB +17	WC +24	GWS +20	5 (15–6–1)	WB +13	COL −20		
Geelong	ESS +66	SYD −30	COL +13	BL +10	HAW −12	NM +60	FRE −3	GWS +53	STK −10	PA +35	ADE +42	WB +13	X	WC +18	RIC +3	NM +112	MEL +28	CAR +30	PA +12	WB +28	STK +45	GC +60	WC +85	1 (18–4–0)	COL +6	X	BL +71	SYD +81
Gold Coast	WC +27	MEL −13	GWS −26	CAR +30	STK −26	BL −52	COL −25	SYD +14	FRE +36	WB −19	HAW +67	NM +62	X	ADE +43	PA −2	COL −5	RIC +2	ESS −48	BL −17	WC +3	HAW −7	GEE −60	NM +67	12 (10–12–0)				
Greater Western Sydney	SYD −20	RIC −36	GC +26	FRE −34	MEL −67	STK −17	ADE +59	GEE −53	CAR −30	WC +52	BL −14	X	NM +49	WB −20	COL −11	HAW +22	PA −55	BL −40	CAR −36	SYD −73	ESS +27	WB −5	FRE −20	16 (6–16–0)				
Hawthorn	NM +20	PA +64	CAR −1	STK −69	GEE +12	SYD −41	MEL −10	ESS −27	RIC −23	BL +5	GC −67	COL −4	FRE −13	X	WB −42	GWS −22	ADE +32	WC +25	NM +46	STK −12	GC +7	RIC −61	WB −23	13 (8–14–0)				
Melbourne	WB +26	GC +13	ESS +29	PA +32	GWS +67	RIC +22	HAW +10	STK +38	WC +74	NM +47	FRE −38	SYD −12	COL −26	X	BL +64	ADE +29	GEE −28	PA +14	WB −10	FRE +46	COL −7	CAR +5	BL +58	2 (16–6–0)	SYD −22	BL −13		
North Melbourne	HAW −20	WC +15	BL −108	SYD −11	WB −68	GEE −60	CAR −50	FRE −78	PA −69	MEL −47	STK −53	GC −62	GWS −49	X	ADE −57	GEE −112	COL −7	RIC +4	HAW −46	ESS −48	SYD −38	ADE −29	GC −67	18 (2–20–0)				
Port Adelaide	BL −11	HAW −64	ADE −4	MEL −32	CAR −3	WC +84	STK +1	WB +17	NM +69	GEE −35	ESS +16	X	RIC −12	SYD +23	GC +2	FRE −8	GWS +55	MEL −14	GEE −12	COL −6	RIC −38	ESS +84	ADE +56	11 (10–12–0)				
Richmond	CAR −25	GWS +36	STK −33	WB +38	ADE −19	MEL −22	WC +109	COL +27	HAW +23	ESS +32	SYD −6	X	PA +12	CAR +15	GEE −3	WC +35	GC −2	NM −4	FRE; 0	BL +7	PA +38	HAW +61	ESS +66	7 (13–8–1)	BL −2			
St Kilda	COL −17	FRE +10	RIC +33	HAW +69	GC +26	GWS +17	PA −1	MEL −38	GEE +10	ADE +21	NM +53	X	BL −21	ESS −35	SYD −51	CAR +15	FRE −41	WB −28	WC +28	HAW +12	GEE −45	BL −15	SYD −14	10 (11–11–0)				
Sydney	GWS +20	GEE +30	WB −11	NM +11	WC +63	HAW +41	BL −24	GC −14	ESS +58	CAR −15	RIC +6	MEL +12	X	PA −23	STK +51	ESS −9	WB +53	FRE +17	ADE +33	GWS +73	NM +38	COL +27	STK +14	3 (16–6–0)	MEL +22	X	COL +1	GEE −81
West Coast	GC −27	NM −15	FRE −55	COL +13	SYD −63	PA −84	RIC −109	BL −75	MEL −74	GWS −52	WB −101	ADE −31	X	GEE −18	ESS +10	RIC −35	CAR −63	HAW −25	STK −28	GC −3	ADE −16	FRE −24	GEE −85	17 (2–20–0)				
Western Bulldogs	MEL −26	CAR −12	SYD +11	RIC −38	NM +68	ADE −1	ESS +32	PA −17	COL +48	GC +19	WC +101	GEE −13	X	GWS +20	HAW +42	BL −41	SYD −53	STK +28	MEL +10	GEE −28	FRE −17	GWS +5	HAW +23	8 (12–10–0)	FRE −13			

== Season notes ==
- Port Adelaide recorded its longest winless start to an AFL season, its record standing at 0–5 after five rounds; its previous worst start had been 0–4.
- Carlton became the first team since 1977 to place in finals standings in every week except for the last round and miss the finals completely.
- Through the home-and-away season, Collingwood won a record eleven games by margins less than two goals; no club had previously won more than eight games by such narrow margins in a year.

== Player milestones ==
Player milestones
Name	Club	Milestone	Round
Callan Ward	Greater Western Sydney	250 AFL games	Round 2
Lance Franklin	Sydney	1000 AFL goals	Round 2
Daniel Rich	Brisbane Lions	250 AFL games	Round 4
Lachie Neale	Brisbane Lions	200 AFL games	Round 5
Jeremy Howe	Collingwood	200 AFL games	Round 5
Jamie Cripps	West Coast	200 AFL games	Round 5
Stefan Martin	Western Bulldogs	200 AFL games	Round 6
Tom Lynch	Richmond	200 AFL games	Round 7
Josh Kennedy	West Coast	700 AFL goals	Round 7
Tom McDonald	Melbourne	200 AFL games	Round 8
Chad Wingard	Hawthorn	200 AFL games	Round 9
Dyson Heppell	Essendon	200 AFL games	Round 9
Jack Redden	West Coast	250 AFL games	Round 9
Dane Rampe	Sydney	200 AFL games	Round 10
Adam Treloar	Western Bulldogs	200 AFL games	Round 10
Bradley Hill	St Kilda	200 AFL games	Round 10
Jake Melksham	Melbourne	200 AFL games	Round 11
Jack Ziebell	North Melbourne	250 AFL games	Round 11
Luke Breust	Hawthorn	250 AFL games	Round 12
Liam Shiels	Hawthorn	250 AFL games	Round 12
Jeremy Cameron	Geelong	500 AFL goals	Round 12
Dylan Grimes	Richmond	200 AFL games	Round 13
Callan Ward	Greater Western Sydney	200 Greater Western Sydney games	Round 13
Tom Hawkins	Geelong	700 AFL goals	Round 14
Jack Newnes	Carlton	200 AFL games	Round 15
Jeremy Cameron	Geelong	200 AFL games	Round 15
Jack Macrae	Western Bulldogs	200 AFL games	Round 16
Luke Parker	Sydney	250 AFL games	Round 16
Mitch Duncan	Geelong	250 AFL games	Round 16
Jack Darling	West Coast	250 AFL games	Round 16
Isaac Smith	Geelong	250 AFL games	Round 17
Josh Kennedy	West Coast	700 West Coast goals	Round 17
Scott Pendlebury	Collingwood	350 AFL games	Round 18
Tom Jonas	Port Adelaide	200 AFL games	Round 20
Ollie Wines	Port Adelaide	200 AFL games	Round 20
Joel Selwood	Geelong	350 AFL games	Round 20
Andrew Gaff	West Coast	250 AFL games	Round 20
Shane Edwards	Richmond	300 AFL games	Round 20
Rory Laird	Adelaide	200 AFL games	Round 21

== Coach changes ==
Outgoing coach	Club	Date	Notes	Caretaker coach	Incoming coach
Leon Cameron	Greater Western Sydney	12 May 2022	Stepped down after round 9 following poor start to the season in his final year of contract.	Mark McVeigh	Adam Kingsley
David Noble	North Melbourne	12 July 2022	Sacked during an extensive review of the club's football operations and continued poor on-field performances.	Leigh Adams	Alastair Clarkson
Ben Rutten	Essendon	21 August 2022	Sacked following a change in club presidency and a series of uncompetitive on-field performances.	N/A (after season)	Brad Scott
Brett Ratten	St Kilda	13 October 2022	Sacked after an extensive review of the club's football operations and a poor finish to the season.	N/A (after season)	Ross Lyon

== Home attendances and membership ==
The following table excludes finals matches.

Team	Home match attendance						Membership		
Team	Hosted	Total	Highest	Lowest	Average		2021	2022	Change
Team	Hosted	Total	Highest	Lowest	2021	2022	2021	2022	Change
Adelaide	11	345,719	39,190	22,859	24,786	31,429	60,232	63,099	▲2,867
Brisbane Lions	11	284,000	32,312	19,331	20,603	25,818	40,289	43,319	▲3,030
Carlton	11	547,628	88,287	25,376	29,548	49,784	81,302	88,776	▲7,474
Collingwood	11	534,306	80,627	25,897	32,444	48,573	82,527	100,384	▲17,857
Essendon	11	437,289	84,205	20,568	30,294	39,754	81,662	86,001	▲4,339
Fremantle	11	445,056	53,816	25,284	30,008	40,460	50,342	56,105	▲5,763
Geelong	11	295,622	59,335	18,091	22,412	26,875	70,293	71,943	▲1,650
Gold Coast	11	124,276	18,031	5,523	8,437	11,298	19,460	21,422	▲1,962
Greater Western Sydney	11	101,405	25,572	4,014	7,163	9,219	30,185	32,614	▲2,429
Hawthorn	11	291,527	48,030	9,022	16,619	26,502	77,079	81,494	▲4,415
Melbourne	11	431,394	70,956	6,312	27,856	39,218	53,188	66,484	▲13,296
North Melbourne	11	158,045	32,162	5,072	11,174	14,368	46,357	50,191	▲3,834
Port Adelaide	11	326,627	50,090	23,058	30,266	29,693	56,532	58,643	▲2,111
Richmond	11	511,331	70,334	21,757	30,166	46,485	105,084	100,792	▼4,292
St Kilda	11	279,241	40,129	6,645	19,552	25,386	55,802	60,172	▲4,370
Sydney	11	323,664	44,659	22,307	23,330	29,424	50,144	55,394	▲5,250
West Coast	11	404,096	50,117	20,932	41,849	36,736	106,422	102,897	▼3,525
Western Bulldogs	11	271,205	34,961	6,040	21,016	24,655	46,541	50,941	▲4,400
Total/overall	198	6,112,431	88,287	4,014	23,751	30,871	1,113,441	1,190,671	▲77,230

Source: AFL Tables

== Awards ==
=== Major awards ===
- The Norm Smith Medal was awarded to Geelong's Isaac Smith.
- The Brownlow Medal was awarded to Carlton's Patrick Cripps.
- The Leigh Matthews Trophy was awarded to Fremantle's Andrew Brayshaw.
- The Coleman Medal was awarded to Carlton's Charlie Curnow.
- The Goal of the Year was awarded to Essendon's Sam Draper.
- The Mark of the Year was awarded to Port Adelaide's Mitch Georgiades.
- The AFL Rising Star was awarded to Collingwood's Nick Daicos.

=== Coleman Medal ===
1	Led the goalkicking at the end of the round
1	Led the goalkicking at the end of the home-and-away season
1_{1}	Subscript indicates the player's goal tally to that point of the season
–	Did not play during that round
X	Had a bye during that round

#	Player	Club	Home-and-away season (Coleman Medal)																							Finals series				Total	Games	Average
#	Player	Club	1	2	3	4	5	6	7	8	9	10	11	12	13	14	15	16	17	18	19	20	21	22	23	F1	F2	F3	GF	Total	Games	Average
1	Tom Hawkins	Geelong	4_{4}	1_{5}	3_{8}	5_{13}	3_{16}	4_{20}	2_{22}	1_{23}	4_{27}	2_{29}	2_{31}	2_{33}	X_{33}	3_{36}	0_{36}	6_{42}	1_{43}	2_{45}	4_{49}	2_{51}	3_{54}	1_{55}	4_{59}	1_{60}	X_{60}	4_{64}	3_{67}	67	25	2.68
2	Jeremy Cameron	Geelong	2_{2}	-_{2}	6_{8}	1_{9}	3_{12}	7_{19}	-_{19}	5_{24}	1_{25}	3_{28}	4_{32}	6_{38}	X_{38}	1_{39}	3_{42}	4_{46}	-_{46}	3_{49}	3_{52}	2_{54}	2_{56}	3_{59}	-_{59}	3_{62}	X_{62}	1_{63}	2_{65}	65	24	2.72
3	Charlie Curnow	Carlton	0_{0}	5_{5}	3_{8}	1_{9}	5_{14}	2_{16}	3_{19}	6_{25}	2_{27}	6_{33}	4_{37}	X_{37}	2_{39}	1_{40}	4_{44}	1_{45}	5_{50}	3_{53}	4_{57}	2_{59}	2_{61}	1_{62}	2_{64}					64	22	2.91
4	Tom Lynch	Richmond	2_{2}	3_{5}	1_{6}	4_{10}	2_{12}	2_{14}	7_{21}	6_{27}	4_{31}	0_{31}	-_{31}	X_{31}	-_{31}	3_{34}	3_{37}	2_{39}	0_{39}	-_{39}	-_{39}	4_{43}	4_{47}	8_{55}	5_{60}	3_{63}				63	19	3.31
5	Bayley Fritsch	Melbourne	2_{2}	1_{3}	2_{5}	3_{8}	4_{12}	2_{14}	1_{15}	1_{16}	3_{19}	3_{22}	3_{25}	3_{28}	1_{29}	X_{29}	3_{32}	1_{33}	1_{34}	2_{36}	4_{40}	3_{43}	2_{45}	1_{46}	4_{50}	3_{53}	2_{55}			55	24	2.29
6	Charlie Cameron	Brisbane Lions	1_{1}	2_{3}	2_{5}	2_{7}	1_{8}	4_{12}	3_{15}	4_{19}	4_{23}	3_{26}	1_{27}	3_{30}	1_{31}	X_{31}	0_{31}	4_{35}	1_{36}	3_{39}	3_{42}	2_{44}	2_{46}	1_{47}	0_{47}	3_{50}	3_{53}	1_{54}		54	25	2.16
7	Tyson Stengle	Geelong	4_{4}	0_{4}	0_{4}	1_{5}	3_{8}	2_{10}	3_{13}	3_{16}	1_{17}	3_{20}	3_{23}	0_{23}	X_{23}	3_{26}	3_{29}	2_{31}	1_{32}	1_{33}	2_{35}	2_{37}	2_{39}	3_{42}	4_{46}	0_{46}	X_{46}	3_{49}	4_{53}	53	25	2.12
8	Peter Wright	Essendon	2_{2}	3_{5}	4_{9}	3_{12}	0_{12}	1_{13}	4_{17}	6_{23}	2_{25}	0_{25}	0_{25}	X_{25}	0_{25}	4_{29}	4_{33}	2_{35}	5_{40}	2_{42}	3_{45}	2_{47}	2_{49}	1_{50}	3_{53}					53	22	2.41
9	Lance Franklin	Sydney	1_{1}	4_{5}	2_{7}	2_{9}	0_{9}	3_{12}	6_{18}	1_{19}	2_{21}	2_{23}	5_{28}	-_{28}	X_{28}	1_{29}	1_{30}	2_{32}	2_{34}	1_{35}	3_{38}	3_{41}	4_{45}	3_{48}	2_{50}	0_{50}	X	2_{52}	0_{52}	52	23	2.26
9	Max King	St Kilda	1_{1}	4_{5}	4_{9}	4_{13}	3_{16}	1_{17}	2_{19}	2_{21}	2_{23}	6_{29}	3_{32}	X_{32}	2_{34}	1_{35}	0_{35}	3_{38}	2_{40}	2_{42}	2_{44}	2_{46}	1_{47}	0_{47}	5_{52}					52	22	2.36

=== Best and fairest ===
Club	Award name	Player (Multiple wins)
Adelaide	Malcolm Blight Medal	Rory Laird (3)
Brisbane Lions	Merrett–Murray Medal	Lachie Neale (3)
Carlton	John Nicholls Medal	Patrick Cripps (4)
Collingwood	Copeland Trophy	Jack Crisp (2)
Essendon	W. S. Crichton Medal	Peter Wright
Fremantle	Doig Medal	Andrew Brayshaw
Geelong	Carji Greeves Medal	Jeremy Cameron; Cameron Guthrie (2)
Gold Coast	Club Champion	Touk Miller (2)
Greater Western Sydney	Kevin Sheedy Medal	Sam Taylor
Hawthorn	Peter Crimmins Medal	James Sicily
Melbourne	Keith 'Bluey' Truscott Trophy	Clayton Oliver (4)
North Melbourne	Syd Barker Medal	Jy Simpkin (2)
Port Adelaide	John Cahill Medal	Connor Rozee
Richmond	Jack Dyer Medal	Tom Lynch
St Kilda	Trevor Barker Award	Jack Sinclair
Sydney	Bob Skilton Medal	Callum Mills
West Coast	John Worsfold Medal	Tom Barrass
Western Bulldogs	Charles Sutton Medal	Josh Dunkley

== See also ==
- 2022 AFL Women's season 6
- 2022 AFL Women's season 7
- 2022 Australian football code crowds

== Sources ==
- Official website
- Season results
