= Kevin Dynon =

Australian rules footballer

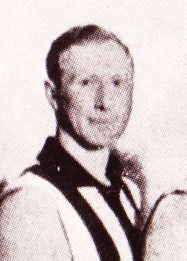

Personal information
- Full name: Kevin James Dynon
- Born: 11 August 1925; Kensington, Victoria
- Died: 8 September 2017 (aged 92)
- Original team: North Colts
- Height: 179 cm (5 ft 10 in)
- Weight: 85 kg (187 lb)

Playing career^{1}
Years	Club	Games (Goals)
1943–1954	North Melbourne	149 (83)

Coaching career
Years	Club	Games (W–L–D)
1955–1956	Moorabbin (VFA)	41 (26–15–0)
- ^{1} Playing statistics correct to the end of 1954.

Career highlights
- North Melbourne captain: 1947, 1952–53

Kevin James Dynon (11 August 1925 – 8 September 2017) was an Australian rules footballer who played for the North Melbourne Football Club in the Australian Football League (VFL).

== Early years ==
Dynon was brought up in Kensington, Victoria and attended St. Joseph's CBC North Melbourne between 1936 and 1940 where he attained his Intermediate Certificate. He was noted for his overall athletic prowess and exceptional sporting ability which allowed him to become a member of the school's tennis, cricket, handball and football teams at various times. In 1940 he earned the title of college captain and was the senior sports champion, winning the 90 yards hurdles, broad jump, high jump and coming second in the 100 yards sprint (under 16). In the same year he acted as captain of the handball team and the athletics squad.

== Military ==
Barely 18 years of age, he enlisted into the Royal Australian Air Force and served in the AFHQ Telecommunication Unit until his discharge as a leading aircraftman in March 1946. During his war service he survived a cyclone in Exmouth, Western Australia by sheltering under a truck after all the base buildings had been blown away. Following his discharge he resumed work in the Federal Public Service.

== Football career ==
Dynon was appointed captain of North Melbourne Football Club in 1947 at age 21, the youngest captain of the club until 1972 when David Dench was appointed at just 20. In 1951, playing with the North Old Boys', he was part of the team which won the Premiership in the Combined Catholic Old Collegians' Association.

In 1952 and 1953 he renewed his captaincy of the Kangaroos, five years after being first appointed.

In 1955 Dynon joined Moorabbin Football Club, in the Victorian Football Association (VFA) as captain-coach.
