= Jy Simpkin =

Australian rules footballer (born 1998)

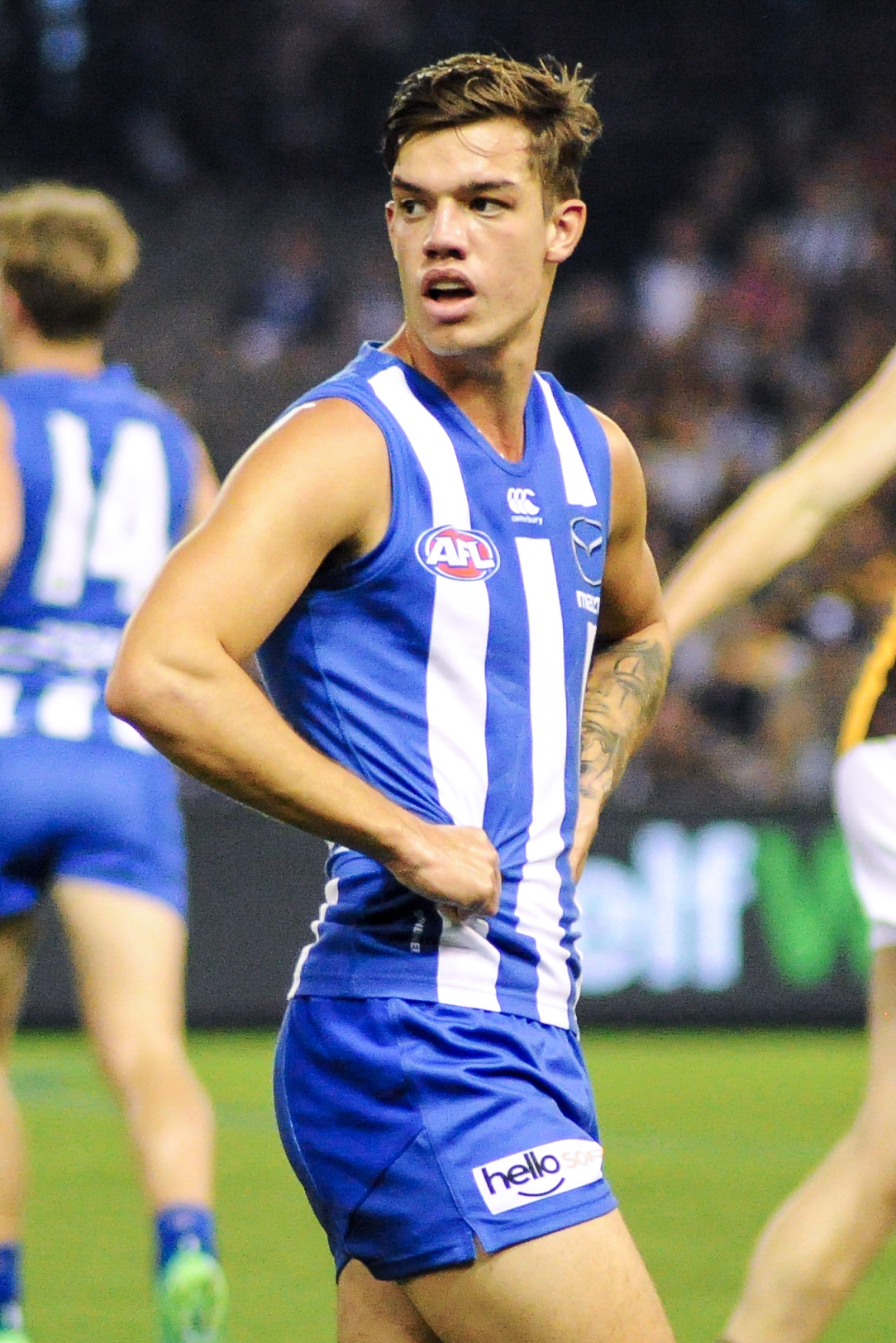
- Simpkin playing for North Melbourne in April 2018

Personal information
- Full name: Jy Simpkin
- Born: 5 March 1998 (age 28); Mooroopna, Victoria
- Original team: Murray Bushrangers (TAC Cup)/Scotch College (APS)/Mooroopna
- Draft: No. 12, 2016 national draft
- Debut: Round 1, 2017, North Melbourne vs. West Coast, at Etihad Stadium
- Height: 182 cm (6 ft 0 in)
- Weight: 75 kg (165 lb)
- Position: Midfielder

Club information
- Current club: North Melbourne
- Number: 12

Playing career^{1}
Years	Club	Games (Goals)
2017–	North Melbourne	196 (87)

Representative team honours
Years	Team	Games (Goals)
2025	Indigenous All-Stars	1 (1)
- ^{1} Playing statistics correct to the end of the 2026 season.

Career highlights
- North Melbourne co-captain: 2023–2024; captain: 2025; 2x Syd Barker Medal: 2021, 2022; Polly Farmer Medal: 2025

Jy Simpkin (born 5 March 1998) is a professional Australian rules footballer playing for the North Melbourne Football Club in the Australian Football League (AFL). He was drafted by the North Melbourne Football Club with their first selection and twelfth overall in the 2016 national draft. He made his debut in the 43-point loss against West Coast in round one of the 2017 season at Etihad Stadium.

Born in Mooroopna, Victoria, Simpkin is of Aboriginal (Yorta Yorta) and European descent. He completed his high-school education at Scotch College, as part of an AIEF scholarship program.

Ahead of the 2023 AFL season, Simpkin was named co-captain of North Melbourne alongside Luke McDonald, replacing Jack Ziebell. In 2025, Simpkin was named sole captain, however, at the end of the season, he stood down from the role, following his attempt to exit the club during the trade period.

== Statistics ==
Updated to the end of round 22, 2026.

Legend
G	Goals	K	Kicks	D	Disposals	T	Tackles
B	Behinds	H	Handballs	M	Marks

Season	Team	No.	Games	Totals							Averages (per game)							Votes
Season	Team	No.	Games	G	B	K	H	D	M	T	G	B	K	H	D	M	T	Votes
2017	North Melbourne	21	13	9	5	72	69	141	35	31	0.7	0.4	5.5	5.3	10.8	2.7	2.4	0
2018	North Melbourne	12	22	12	7	144	183	327	51	80	0.5	0.3	6.5	8.3	14.9	2.3	3.6	0
2019	North Melbourne	12	21	6	8	200	190	390	49	75	0.3	0.4	9.5	9.0	18.6	2.3	3.6	1
2020 (Note: The 2020 season was played with 17 home-and-away matches per team (down from 22) and 16-minute quarters with time on (down from 20-minute quarters with time on) due to the impact of the COVID-19 pandemic.)	North Melbourne	12	17	6	5	171	173	344	37	63	0.4	0.3	10.1	10.2	20.2	2.2	3.7	8
2021	North Melbourne	12	22	2	5	325	267	592	96	84	0.1	0.2	14.8	12.1	26.9	4.4	3.8	1
2022	North Melbourne	12	21	7	5	324	235	559	71	95	0.3	0.2	15.4	11.2	26.6	3.4	4.5	6
2023	North Melbourne	12	18	9	4	194	178	372	48	71	0.5	0.2	10.8	9.9	20.7	2.7	3.9	0
2024	North Melbourne	12	18	11	5	218	160	378	56	56	0.6	0.3	12.1	8.9	21.0	3.1	3.1	1
2025	North Melbourne	12	21	12	10	269	196	465	85	67	0.6	0.5	12.8	9.3	22.1	4.0	3.2	6
2026	North Melbourne	12	21	10	11	260	195	455	106	41	0.5	0.5	12.4	9.3	21.7	5.0	2.0	0
Career			194	84	65	2177	1846	4023	634	663	0.4	0.3	11.2	9.5	20.7	3.3	3.4	23
