= List of North Melbourne Football Club captains =

This is a list of all captains of the North Melbourne Football Club, an Australian rules football club in the Australian Football League.

== VFL/AFL ==
Dates	Captain(s)	Notes
1925	Wels Eicke	
1926	Wels Eicke; Gerry Donnelly	
1927	Syd Barker, Sr. Charlie Tyson	
1928	Charlie Tyson	
1929	Charlie Tyson; Tim Trevaskis	
1930–1931	Johnny Lewis	
1932–1933	Dick Taylor	
1934	Dick Taylor; Tom Fitzmaurice	
1935	Tom Fitzmaurice; Ted Llewellyn	
1936	Charlie Gaudion	
1937	Charlie Gaudion; Jim Adamson	
1938–1939	Keith Forbes	
1940	Len Thomas; Jim Adamson	
1941	Jock Cordner; Bill Findlay	
1942–1943	Bill Findlay	
1944–1945	Dally O'Brien	
1946	Fred Fairweather	
1947	Kevin Dynon	
1948–1951	Les Foote	
1952–1953	Kevin Dynon	
1954	Gerald Marchesi	
1955	Vic Lawrence	
1956	Bob Brooker	
1957–1959	John Brady	
1960	Al Mantello	
1961–1964	Allen Aylett	
1965–1967	Noel Teasdale	
1968–1970	John Dugdale	
1971	Barry Goodingham	
1972	David Dench	
1973–1975	Barry Davis	1975 Premiership Captain
1976–1978	Keith Greig	
1979	Keith Greig; Wayne Schimmelbusch	
1980–1987	Wayne Schimmelbusch	
1988	Wayne Schimmelbusch; John Law	
1989	John Law	
1990–1992	Matthew Larkin	
1993–2001	Wayne Carey	1996 Premiership Captain; 1999 Premiership Captain
2002–2003	Anthony Stevens	
2004–2008	Adam Simpson	
2009–2011	Brent Harvey	
2012–2016	Andrew Swallow	
2017–2022	Jack Ziebell	
2023–2024	Jy Simpkin; Luke McDonald	
2025	Jy Simpkin	
2026–	Nick Larkey	

== AFL Women's ==
Dates	Captain(s)	Notes
2019–2024	Emma Kearney	2024 premiership captain
2025–	Jasmine Garner	2025 premiership captain
