= Luke McDonald (footballer) =

Australian rules footballer (born 1995)

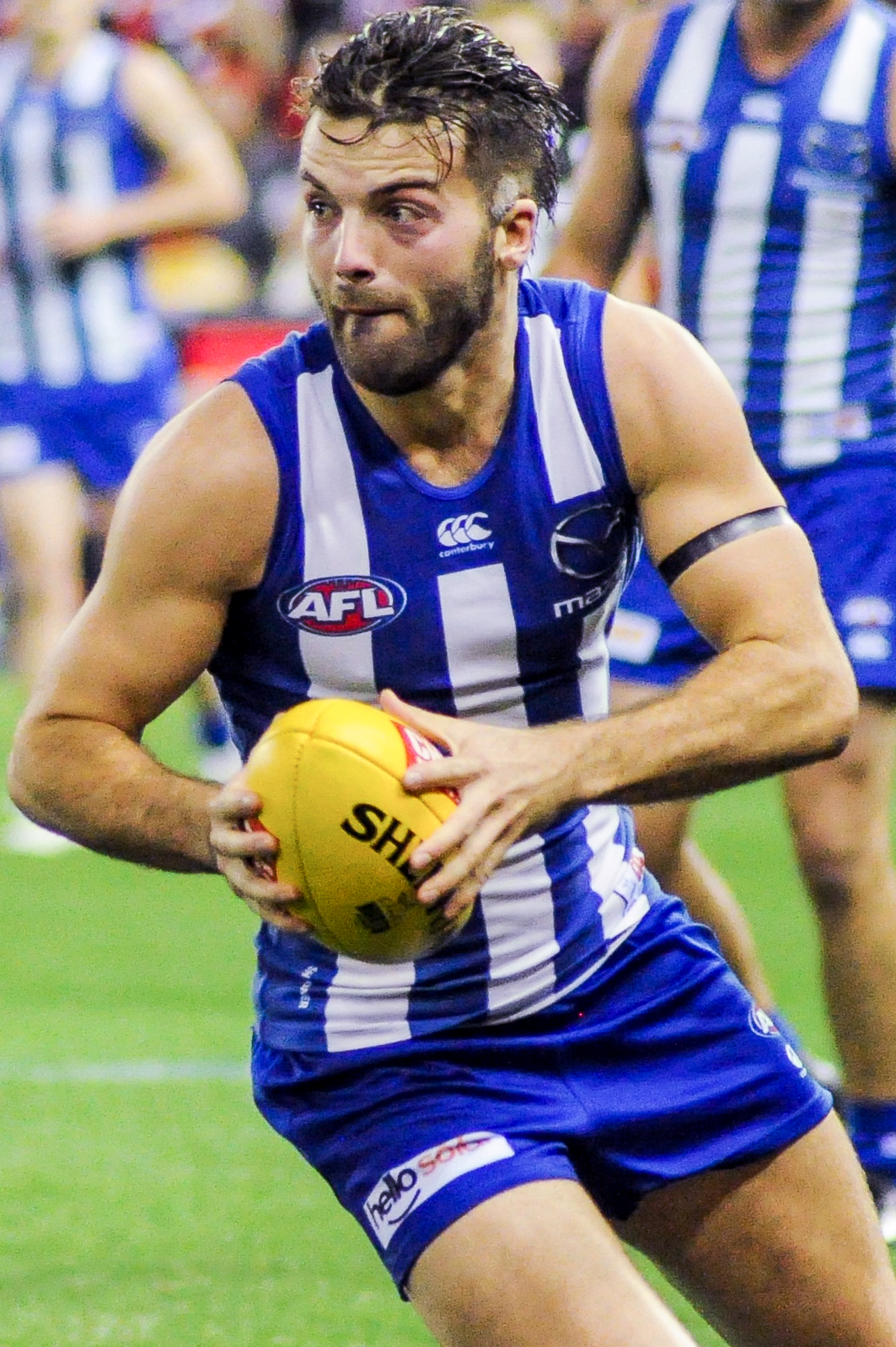
- McDonald in June 2017

Personal information
- Full name: Luke Donald McDonald
- Born: 9 February 1995 (age 31)
- Original team: Werribee (VFL)/Oakleigh Chargers (TAC Cup)/Kew Comets (YJFL)
- Draft: No. 8 (F/S), 2013 national draft
- Debut: Round 1, 2014, North Melbourne vs. Essendon, at Docklands Stadium
- Height: 189 cm (6 ft 2 in)
- Weight: 88 kg (194 lb)
- Position: Defender

Club information
- Current club: North Melbourne
- Number: 11

Playing career^{1}
| Years | Club | Games (Goals) |
| 2014– | North Melbourne | 235 (19) |
- ^{1} Playing statistics correct to the end of round 22, 2026.

Career highlights
- North Melbourne co-captain: 2023–2024; Syd Barker Medal: 2020; AFL Rising Star nominee: 2014; 22under22 team: 2014

Luke Donald McDonald (born 9 February 1995) is an Australian rules footballer who plays for the North Melbourne Football Club in the Australian Football League (AFL). He was recruited under the father–son rule with the eighth selection in the 2013 national draft. His father, Donald McDonald played 155 games for North Melbourne and was working in the club's football department until he left to avoid any conflict of interest.

== Early life ==
McDonald participated in the Auskick program at Kew-Victoria Park. He played his junior football with the Kew Comets (YJFL) and his senior football at the Werribee (VFL) whilst also playing for the Oakleigh Chargers (TAC Cup) from which he was drafted by the North Melbourne Football Club at No. 8 in the 2013 National Draft. In 2012 during his final year of school, he captained Trinity Grammar to a premiership in the AGSV competition.

== AFL career ==
=== North Melbourne (2014-) ===
McDonald played VFL for North Melbourne affiliate Werribee during the 2013 season and attended North's preseason training camp in Utah. He made his debut in the opening round of 2014 against Essendon and played in all but 1 game of that season including the finals campaign. He was voted 3rd in Rising Star award behind Western Bulldogs' Marcus Bontempelli and Brisbane Lions' Lewis Taylor. McDonald played in the 2014 AFL finals series including North's elimination final win against Essendon, semi final win against Geelong where he was named in the bests picking up 20 disposals. McDonald also participated in North's heavy preliminary final defeat to the Sydney Swans at ANZ Stadium.

In February 2015, McDonald revealed that he had suffered a stress fracture to his back during a match against the Brisbane Lions in Round 15 of the previous season. The injury threatened to develop into a fracture-proper and McDonald was unable to train between games. Despite his injury concerns, he was noted in the media for several acts of courage on the field especially a tendency to 'go back with the flight of the ball'.

During North Melbourne's 2015 season McDonald played 14 games, kicking his first goal in North's Semi Final win over the Sydney Swans at ANZ Stadium. While many commentators called McDonald's 2015 season disappointing including McDonald himself, in 2016 he regained form as well as his place in the team's best 22. In a round 13 Friday night game however, during a chase-down run of Hawthorn's small forward Cyril Rioli, McDonald injured his hamstring sidelining him for 10 weeks.

McDonald was North Melbourne’s co-captain, alongside teammate Jy Simpkin for the 2023 & 2024 seasons before standing down the captaincy for the 2025 season.

In August 2026 he signed a one year contract extension, keeping him at North until at least the end of the 2027 season.

== Statistics ==
Updated to the end of round 22, 2026.

Legend
| G | Goals | K | Kicks | D | Disposals | T | Tackles |
| B | Behinds | H | Handballs | M | Marks |

| Season | Team | No. | Games | Totals | | | | | | | Averages (per game) | | | | | | | Votes |
| Season | Team | No. | Games | G | B | K | H | D | M | T | G | B | K | H | D | M | T | Votes |
|---|---|---|---|---|---|---|---|---|---|---|---|---|---|---|---|---|---|---|
| 2014 | North Melbourne | 21 | 23 | 0 | 6 | 207 | 182 | 389 | 86 | 59 | 0.0 | 0.3 | 9.0 | 7.9 | 16.9 | 3.7 | 2.6 | 0 |
| 2015 | North Melbourne | 21 | 14 | 1 | 0 | 105 | 97 | 202 | 44 | 27 | 0.1 | 0.0 | 7.5 | 6.9 | 14.4 | 3.1 | 1.9 | 0 |
| 2016 | North Melbourne | 21 | 15 | 2 | 2 | 129 | 79 | 208 | 62 | 32 | 0.1 | 0.1 | 8.6 | 5.3 | 13.9 | 4.1 | 2.1 | 0 |
| 2017 | North Melbourne | 11 | 22 | 8 | 8 | 276 | 187 | 463 | 92 | 94 | 0.4 | 0.4 | 12.5 | 8.5 | 21.0 | 4.2 | 4.3 | 0 |
| 2018 | North Melbourne | 11 | 22 | 4 | 8 | 242 | 166 | 408 | 95 | 50 | 0.2 | 0.4 | 11.0 | 7.5 | 18.5 | 4.3 | 2.3 | 0 |
| 2019 | North Melbourne | 11 | 13 | 1 | 0 | 101 | 93 | 194 | 51 | 33 | 0.1 | 0.0 | 7.8 | 7.2 | 14.9 | 3.9 | 2.5 | 0 |
| 2020 (Note: The 2020 season was played with 17 home-and-away matches per team (down from 22) and 16-minute quarters with time on (down from 20-minute quarters with time on) due to the impact of the COVID-19 pandemic.) | North Melbourne | 11 | 17 | 0 | 0 | 209 | 135 | 344 | 66 | 44 | 0.0 | 0.0 | 12.3 | 7.9 | 20.2 | 3.9 | 2.6 | 2 |
| 2021 | North Melbourne | 11 | 11 | 0 | 2 | 114 | 75 | 189 | 57 | 28 | 0.0 | 0.2 | 10.4 | 6.8 | 17.2 | 5.2 | 2.5 | 0 |
| 2022 | North Melbourne | 11 | 22 | 1 | 1 | 305 | 141 | 446 | 119 | 54 | 0.0 | 0.0 | 13.9 | 6.4 | 20.3 | 5.4 | 2.5 | 2 |
| 2023 | North Melbourne | 11 | 22 | 1 | 0 | 249 | 134 | 383 | 119 | 80 | 0.0 | 0.0 | 11.3 | 6.1 | 17.4 | 5.4 | 3.6 | 0 |
| 2024 | North Melbourne | 11 | 22 | 0 | 0 | 211 | 98 | 309 | 105 | 51 | 0.0 | 0.0 | 9.6 | 4.5 | 14.0 | 4.8 | 2.3 | 0 |
| 2025 | North Melbourne | 11 | 15 | 0 | 0 | 139 | 93 | 232 | 67 | 30 | 0.0 | 0.0 | 9.3 | 6.2 | 15.5 | 4.5 | 2.0 | 0 |
| 2026 | North Melbourne | 11 | 17 | 1 | 0 | 171 | 93 | 264 | 94 | 32 | 0.1 | 0.0 | 10.1 | 5.5 | 15.5 | 5.5 | 1.9 | 0 |
| Career | | | 235 | 19 | 27 | 2458 | 1573 | 4031 | 1057 | 614 | 0.1 | 0.1 | 10.5 | 6.7 | 17.2 | 4.5 | 2.6 | 4 |
