= Jamie Macmillan =

Australian rules footballer (born 1991)

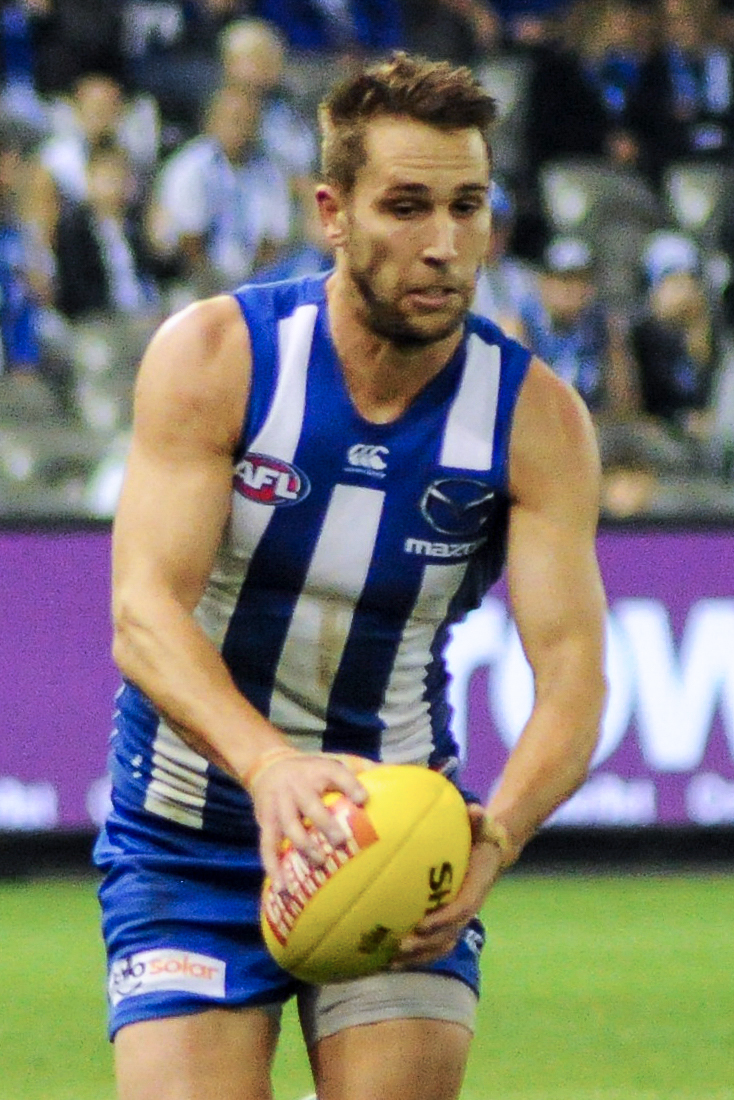
- Macmillan playing for North Melbourne in April 2018

Personal information
- Full name: Jamie Macmillan
- Nicknames: J-Mac, Horse
- Born: 23 September 1991 (age 35)
- Original team: Oakleigh Chargers (TAC Cup)
- Draft: No. 37, 2009 national draft
- Height: 188 cm (6 ft 2 in)
- Weight: 89 kg (196 lb)
- Position: Defender / midfielder

Club information
- Current club: North Melbourne
- Number: 34

Playing career^{1}
Years	Club	Games (Goals)
2010–2020	North Melbourne	167 (46)
- ^{1} Playing statistics correct to the end of 2020.

Jamie Macmillan (born 23 September 1991) is a former professional Australian rules footballer who played for the North Melbourne Football Club in the Australian Football League (AFL). He was taken with draft pick number 37 in the 2009 National Draft, and played the following year, in the 2010 AFL season. Macmillan attended Scotch College Melbourne where he also played First XI cricket and was a proficient batsman and keeper. Macmillan made his debut in Round 17, against Essendon. He played junior football for the Camberwell Sharks in the Yarra Junior Football League. Macmillan was delisted by North Melbourne at the end of the 2020 AFL season after a mass delisting by North Melbourne which saw 11 players cut from the team's list.

In November 2020, Macmillan was appointed North Melbourne’s AFL Football Operations Manager.

== Personal life ==
Macmillan completed a Bachelor of Commerce, Majoring in Finance and Economics, at the University of Melbourne in 2017, with Macmillan studying his degree part-time over seven years while he was playing for North Melbourne.
