= David Noble (Australian footballer) =

Australian rules footballer and coach

Personal information
- Full name: David Noble
- Born: 15 May 1967 (age 59)
- Original team: North Hobart (TFL)
- Draft: 111th overall, 1989 VFL Draft
- Height: 177 cm (5 ft 10 in)
- Weight: 76 kg (168 lb)

Playing career^{1}
Years	Club	Games (Goals)
1991	Fitzroy	2 (0)

Representative team honours
Years	Team	Games (Goals)
1989–1991	Tasmania	2

Coaching career
Years	Club	Games (W–L–D)
2003–2004	Glenelg	40 (12–28–0)
2021–2022	North Melbourne	38 (5–32–1)
- ^{1} Playing statistics correct to the end of 1991.

Career highlights
- North Hobart Football Club premierships 1987, 1989

David Noble (born 15 May 1967) is a former Australian rules football coach, administrator and player, best known for his tenure as the senior men's coach of the North Melbourne Football Club in 2021 and 2022. He is the chief executive officer of Dick Johnson Racing.

== Playing career ==
=== North Hobart ===
A rover from Tasmania, Noble began his senior football career at North Hobart in the Tasmanian Football League in 1985. He soon was made vice-captain of the club, and won statewide premierships in 1987 and 1989.

=== Fitzroy ===
Noble was drafted by Fitzroy at the 1989 draft with the 111th pick. He played mostly in the reserves at Fitzroy. His senior debut in Round 6, 1991 was the first of four premiership matches Fitzroy played on his former home ground, North Hobart Oval, between 1991 and 1992 – but it was a disaster for Fitzroy, losing to Hawthorn by 157 points. He played only one more senior game for Fitzroy. He played two state of origin matches for Tasmania during his career.

=== Prahran ===
In 1992, Noble played for Prahran in the Victorian Football Association. He then served a successful captain-coaching position at the Upwey-Tecoma Football Club in the Yarra Valley Mountain District Football League in 1993 and 1994, winning two premierships and two best-and-fairest awards at the club. Noble retired from playing at the end of 1994.

== Coaching career ==
Following his successful captain-coaching stint at Upwey-Tecoma, Noble began a coaching career in the TAC Cup, serving as assistant coach at the newly established Oakleigh Chargers, then senior coach at the NSW/ACT Rams. He then joined AFL club the Western Bulldogs for five years from 1998–2002, serving as an assistant coach over that time as well as the reserves coach in 1998 and 1999, winning one reserves premiership.

In 2003, Noble moved to South Australia, and served as senior coach at Glenelg in the South Australian National Football League (SANFL) in 2003 and 2004, but did not take the club to finals. He then joined the AFL's Adelaide Crows and spent more than a decade at the club, serving as assistant coach (2005–10), list manager (2011–13) and head of football (2014–16). He was an integral part of the club’s eight finals campaigns over that ten year period.

=== North Melbourne Football Club senior coach (2021–2022) ===
In 2021, after ten years in administrator, Noble returned to coaching and became the senior coach of North Melbourne on an open-ended staff contract. Taking over a club from previous senior coach Rhyce Shaw after Shaw resigned for personal reasons and the club under Shaw had finished second-last in 2020. Noble led the club to the wooden spoon in 2021 with a 4–17–1 record. He became known for a tough coaching style, with it being said that in just his first season he delivered more sprays than former coach Brad Scott had delivered in a 9½ year tenure; and drew such condemnation for the spray he delivered after his team's "embarrassing" 108-point Round 3, 2022 loss to Brisbane Lions at The Gabba, that he apologised days later. Noble was sacked as senior coach of North Melbourne with six weeks remaining in the 2022 season, after a disastrous 1–15 start to what was eventually a second consecutive wooden spoon; after the club's internal review had concluded it would dismiss Noble as a result of his poor win–loss and negative feedback towards his coaching style from staff and players, he and the club agreed to part ways immediately. Noble was replaced by assistant coach Leigh Adams as caretaker senior coach of North Melbourne for the rest of the 2022 season.

== Administrative career ==
In September 2016, he left Adelaide and moved to become the Brisbane Lions General Manager of Football, serving there for four years and overseeing the Lions' return to finals football. In December 2022 Noble was appointed chief executive officer of motor racing team Dick Johnson Racing.

== Accolades ==
Noble was inducted into the AFL Tasmania Hall of Fame in 2016. His son John has played senior AFL football for Collingwood and plays for Gold Coast currently.
