= Jack Ziebell =

Australian rules footballer (born 1991)

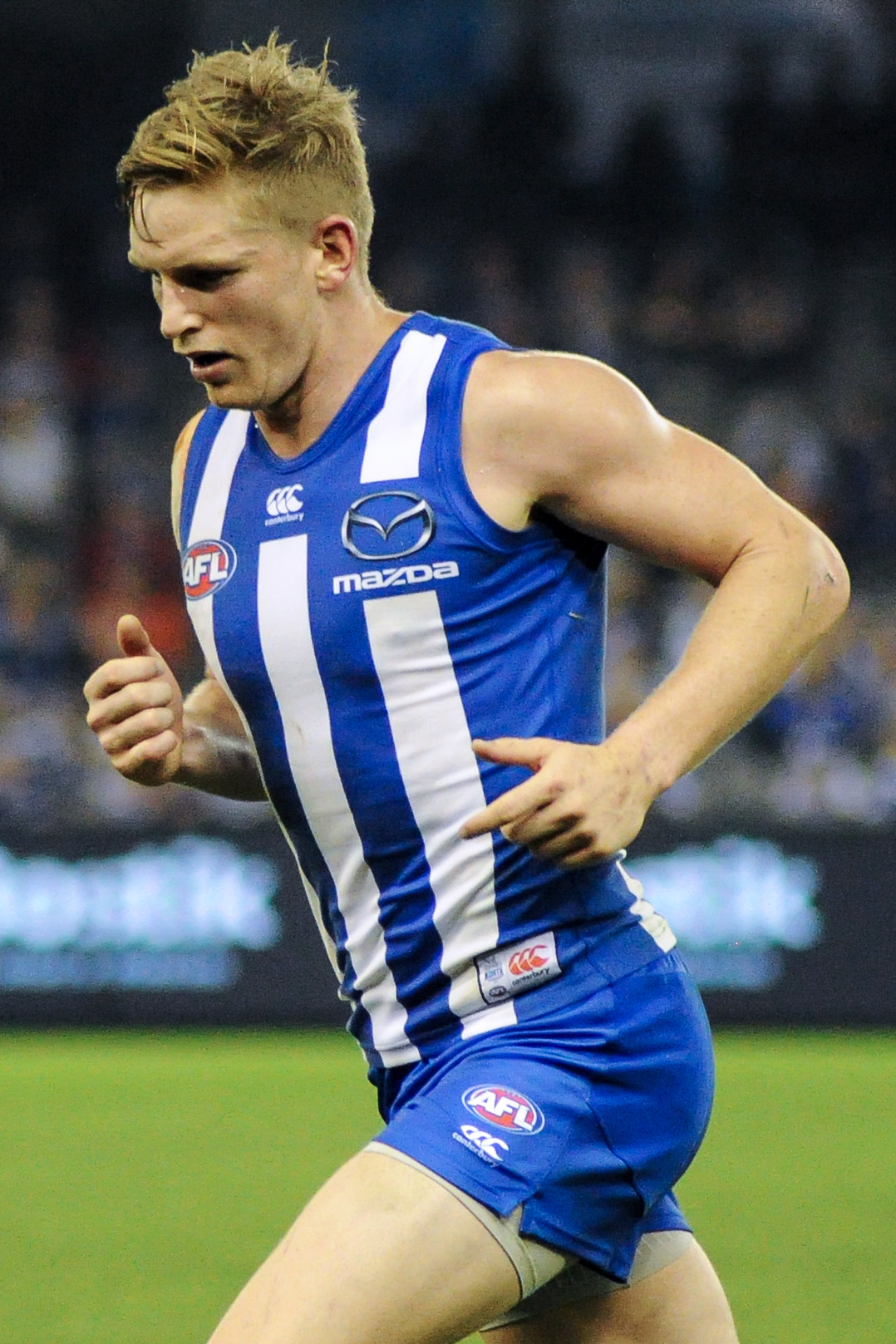
- Ziebell playing for North Melbourne in 2018

Personal information
- Full name: Jack Ziebell
- Born: 28 February 1991 (age 35); Wodonga, Victoria
- Original team: Murray Bushrangers (TAC Cup)/Wodonga Bulldogs
- Draft: No. 9, 2008 national draft
- Debut: Round 1, 2009, North Melbourne vs. Melbourne, at the Melbourne Cricket Ground
- Height: 188 cm (6 ft 2 in)
- Weight: 89 kg (196 lb)
- Position: Midfielder / forward

Playing career
| Years | Club | Games (Goals) |
| 2009–2023 | North Melbourne | 280 (183) |

Career highlights
- North Melbourne captain: 2017–2022; 22under22 team: 2013; AFL Rising Star nominee: 2009

Jack Ziebell (born 28 February 1991) is a former professional Australian rules footballer who played for the North Melbourne Football Club in the Australian Football League (AFL). Ziebell is currently playing for Avondale Heights in the EDFL (Essendon District Football League) Ziebell received a nomination for the 2009 AFL Rising Star award in round 7 of the 2009 season. He was North Melbourne captain from 2017 to 2022.

== Early career ==
Ziebell played for the Murray Bushrangers alongside fellow draftee Steele Sidebottom, and was an important part of the Bushrangers premiership win in 2008, averaging 18 possessions, two goals and six marks a match. Ziebell represented Vic Country at the 2008 NAB AFL Under 18 Championships and gained All-Australian Honours after averaging 17 disposals per match. In his younger years he played local football for Wodonga Bulldogs, where me made his senior debut at just 15 years old.

Ziebell is originally from Wodonga in regional Victoria and attended Caulfield Grammar School as a boarding student where he dominated school football. Prior he attended Wodonga High School. He is of German heritage.

== AFL career ==
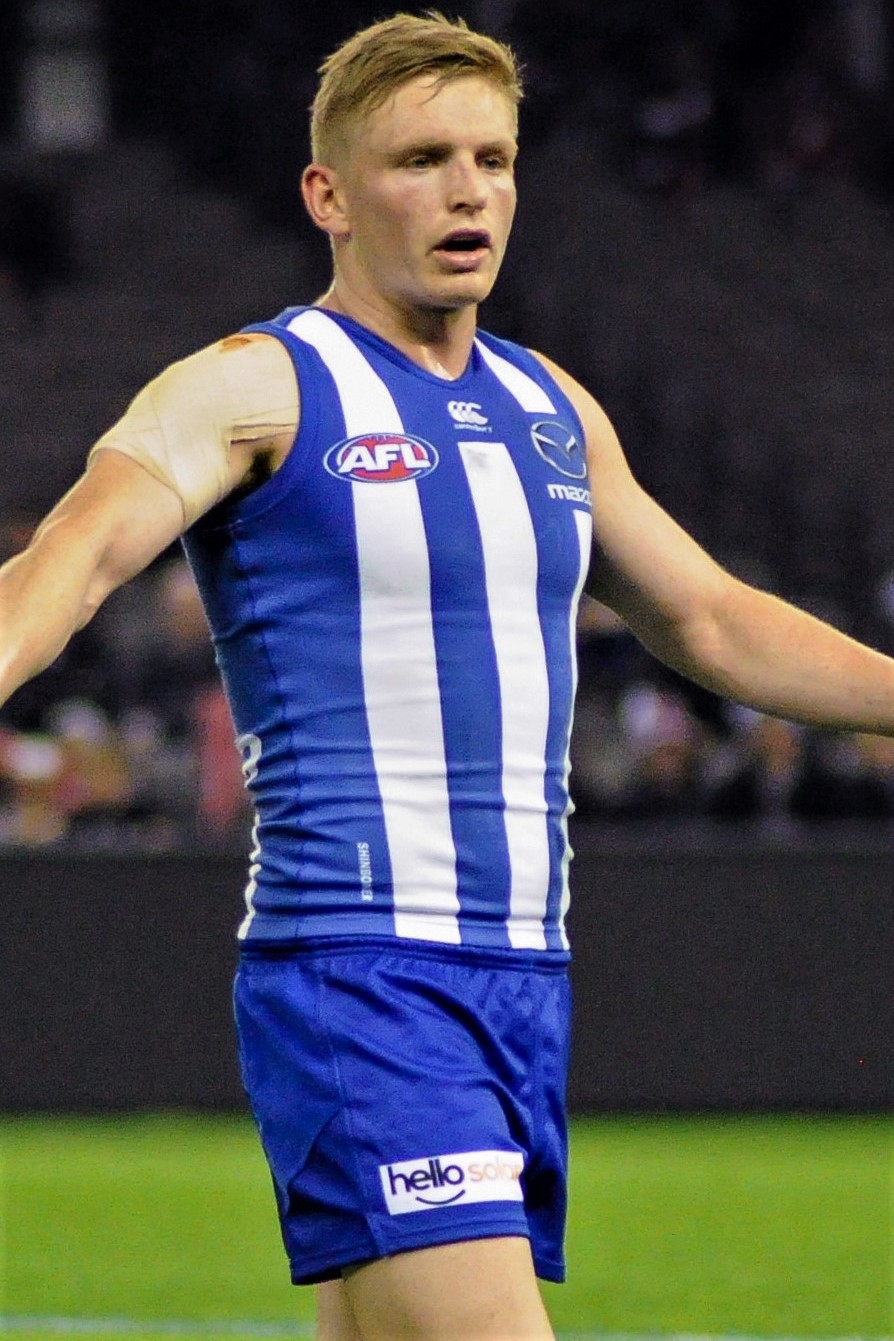
Ziebell playing in 2017

Ziebell made his debut in 2009, his first season at the club, and had an instant impact. He produced consistently impressive performances over the first two months and was rewarded with the Round 7 NAB Rising Star nomination for his 23 disposal and 1 goal game against Port Adelaide. North Melbourne coach, Danielle Laidley, singled him out in the post-match press conference and declared him a "leader" and a "superstar [in the making]". Ziebell was regarded as one of the favourites for the 2009 NAB Rising Star award at the time which is awarded to the best rookie at the end of the season.

However, Ziebell suffered from minor injuries for the next few weeks and his contributions were restricted. His season took an unfortunate turn when he broke his leg against the Adelaide Crows in round 12. He missed the remainder of the 2009 season, after playing just 10 games. However, due to the injury restricting him from playing, Ziebell has retained eligibility for the Rising Star award in 2010, again making him one of the early favourites.

Late in the 2011 season, Ziebell was suspended for three matches for rough conduct on St Kilda captain Nick Riewoldt. This hit was however featured on the AFL's official advertising campaign for the 2012 AFL season.

In December 2016, Ziebell was named North Melbourne's new captain, replacing Andrew Swallow. He remained captain for six years until stepping down before the 2023 season.

On 28 July 2023, Ziebell announced he would retire from AFL at the conclusion of the 2023 season. He retired in the second last round of that year, playing his last game against the Richmond Tigers at the Melbourne Cricket Ground.

== Coaching career ==
Jack Ziebell joined Richmond as an assistant under Adem Yze.

== Statistics ==
Legend
| G | Goals | K | Kicks | D | Disposals | T | Tackles |
| B | Behinds | H | Handballs | M | Marks |

| Season | Team | No. | Games | Totals | | | | | | | Averages (per game) | | | | | | | Votes |
| Season | Team | No. | Games | G | B | K | H | D | M | T | G | B | K | H | D | M | T | Votes |
|---|---|---|---|---|---|---|---|---|---|---|---|---|---|---|---|---|---|---|
| 2009 | North Melbourne | 19 | 10 | 2 | 2 | 108 | 47 | 155 | 42 | 28 | 0.2 | 0.2 | 10.8 | 4.7 | 15.5 | 4.2 | 2.8 | 0 |
| 2010 | North Melbourne | 7 | 14 | 2 | 6 | 126 | 90 | 216 | 46 | 60 | 0.1 | 0.4 | 9.0 | 6.4 | 15.4 | 3.3 | 5.0 | 1 |
| 2011 | North Melbourne | 7 | 21 | 6 | 4 | 255 | 137 | 392 | 63 | 104 | 0.3 | 0.2 | 12.1 | 6.5 | 18.7 | 3.0 | 5.0 | 4 |
| 2012 | North Melbourne | 7 | 17 | 9 | 2 | 222 | 113 | 335 | 67 | 65 | 0.5 | 0.1 | 13.1 | 5.6 | 18.7 | 3.9 | 3.8 | 3 |
| 2013 | North Melbourne | 7 | 18 | 20 | 8 | 259 | 120 | 379 | 67 | 97 | 1.1 | 0.4 | 14.4 | 6.7 | 21.1 | 3.7 | 5.4 | 6 |
| 2014 | North Melbourne | 7 | 20 | 18 | 15 | 240 | 116 | 356 | 85 | 94 | 0.9 | 0.8 | 12.0 | 5.8 | 17.8 | 4.3 | 4.7 | 3 |
| 2015 | North Melbourne | 7 | 24 | 15 | 16 | 354 | 112 | 466 | 93 | 134 | 0.6 | 0.7 | 14.8 | 4.7 | 19.4 | 3.9 | 5.6 | 8 |
| 2016 | North Melbourne | 7 | 23 | 18 | 13 | 352 | 163 | 515 | 84 | 112 | 0.8 | 0.6 | 15.3 | 7.1 | 22.4 | 3.7 | 4.9 | 7 |
| 2017 | North Melbourne | 7 | 19 | 13 | 6 | 262 | 160 | 422 | 66 | 110 | 0.7 | 0.3 | 13.8 | 8.4 | 22.2 | 3.5 | 5.8 | 1 |
| 2018 | North Melbourne | 7 | 22 | 35 | 29 | 267 | 109 | 376 | 104 | 77 | 1.6 | 1.3 | 12.1 | 5.0 | 17.1 | 4.7 | 3.5 | 7 |
| 2019 | North Melbourne | 7 | 22 | 24 | 16 | 282 | 168 | 450 | 84 | 105 | 1.1 | 0.7 | 12.8 | 7.6 | 20.5 | 3.8 | 4.8 | 10 |
| 2020 (Note: The 2020 season was played with 17 home-and-away matches per team (down from 22) and 16-minute quarters with time on (down from 20-minute quarters with time on) due to the impact of the COVID-19 pandemic.) | North Melbourne | 7 | 8 | 1 | 7 | 38 | 25 | 63 | 25 | 16 | 0.1 | 0.9 | 4.8 | 3.1 | 7.9 | 3.1 | 2.0 | 0 |
| 2021 | North Melbourne | 7 | 21 | 2 | 0 | 426 | 104 | 530 | 155 | 40 | 0.1 | 0.0 | 20.3 | 5.0 | 25.2 | 7.4 | 1.9 | 2 |
| 2022 | North Melbourne | 7 | 19 | 17 | 8 | 171 | 85 | 256 | 74 | 42 | 0.9 | 0.4 | 9.0 | 4.5 | 13.5 | 3.9 | 2.2 | 4 |
| 2023 | North Melbourne | 7 | 22 | 1 | 3 | 389 | 99 | 488 | 149 | 41 | 0.0 | 0.1 | 17.7 | 4.5 | 21.2 | 6.8 | 1.9 | 2 |
| Career | | | 280 | 183 | 135 | 3751 | 1648 | 5399 | 1204 | 1125 | 0.7 | 0.5 | 13.4 | 5.9 | 19.3 | 4.3 | 4.0 | 58 |

== Honours and achievements ==
- North Melbourne captain: 2017–2022
- 22under22 team: 2013
- AFL Rising Star nominee: 2009
