= Camperdown Dairy International =

Australian infant formula company

- Type: Private
- Industry: Infant formula
- Founded: 2014
- Defunct: July 2017; 9 years ago
- Fate: Placed into administration in July 2017
- Headquarters: Braeside, Victoria, Australia
- Area served: Australia, China, Vietnam
- Website: camperdowndairyinternational.com.au

Camperdown Dairy International (CDI) was an Australian infant formula company which was founded in 2014 and went into administration in 2017. As well as serving in Australia, it also held licences to sell products in China and Vietnam. It was from 2016 to 2017 one of the two co-major sponsors of the Brisbane Lions.

== History ==
The Camperdown Cheese & Butter Factory began operations in 1891, and CDI purchased the factory in 2014. CDI ran a fully integrated model, being one of the only producers in the world which owned its own farms, processing, and blending and packaging facilities. It was, at one point, one of only eight companies in Australia with a CNCA licence to export infant formula to China. In 2015, CDI secured a 15-year deal, worth $9 billion AUD overall, to sell infant formula to China with Hong Kong Food and beverage company Great Wall Capital Trading. In 2016, CDI announced their co-major sponsorship (with Vero Insurance) with the Brisbane Lions on a three-year contract, starting that season.

In June 2017, Bellamy's Organic announced that it had purchased Camperdown Powder, a subsidiary of CDI, which included its CNCA licence and blending and packaging facilities in Victoria. Bellamy's chief executive Andrew Cohen explained that it would allow his company to now produce its own products and protect its sales channel into China. In July 2017, CDI was placed into administration after an $83 million collapse. It was announced that CDI would not sponsor the Lions for the third year of their contract, and the company was replaced as co-sponsor by Oaks Hotels & Resorts for the 2018 season.

== See also ==
- Dairy farming in Australia
