= Brisbane Lions =

Australian rules football club

Names
- Full name: Brisbane Bears-Fitzroy Football Club Limited, trading as Brisbane Lions Australian Football Club
- Nickname: Lions

2026 season
- After finals: AFL: Premiers
- Home-and-away season: AFL: 3rd
- Leading goalkicker: AFL: Logan Morris (72)
- Best and fairest: AFL: Will Ashcroft

Club details
- Founded: 1 November 1996; From the incorporated AFL operations of: Fitzroy Football Club (formed 1883) Brisbane Bears (formed 1987)
- Colours: Maroon Blue Gold
- Competition: AFL: Senior men AFLW: Senior women VFL: Reserves men Talent League: Academy Boys; Talent League Girls: Academy Girls
- Chairperson: Andrew Wellington
- CEO: Sam Graham
- Coach: AFL: Cameron Bruce; AFLW: Craig Starcevich; VFL: Ben Hudson
- Captain(s): AFL: Harris Andrews Josh Dunkley Hugh McCluggage; AFLW: Breanna Koenen
- Number-one ticket holder(s): Dan Anstey; Abby Coleman
- Premierships: AFL (6): 2001; 2002; 2003; 2024; 2025; 2026; AFLW (2): 2021; 2023; Reserves (5): 2001; 2012; 2013; 2017; 2019
- Ground: AFL: The Gabba (1997–present); AFLW: Springfield Central Stadium (8,000); VFL: Springfield Central Stadium
- Training ground: Springfield Central Stadium (2022–present)

Uniforms
| Home | Away | Clash |

Other information
- Official website: lions.com.au

The Brisbane Lions are a professional Australian rules football club based in Brisbane, Queensland, that compete in the Australian Football League (AFL), the sport's elite competition. Brisbane are the three-time reigning AFL premiers, having won the 2024 Grand Final by 60 points, the 2025 Grand Final by 47 points and 2026 Grand Final by 7 points.

The Lions came into existence in 1996 when expansion club the Brisbane Bears, established in 1987, absorbed the AFL operations of one of the league's foundation clubs, the Fitzroy Football Club, which was established in Melbourne in 1883. The club's colours of maroon, blue, and gold were drawn from both Fitzroy and the Bears.

The club plays its home matches at the Gabba in Brisbane, and its headquarters and training facilities are located at Springfield Central Stadium. The Lions are the most successful club of the AFL era (1990–present), with the best frequency to win a premiership across the entire AFL competition (6 premierships in 30 completed seasons). They appeared in four consecutive grand finals from 2001 to 2004, winning three successive premierships in 2001, 2002 and 2003 before again appearing in four consecutive grand finals during the 2020s, finishing as runners-up in 2023 and winning another three-peat of premierships in 2024, 2025 and 2026.

The Lions were a foundation team in the AFL Women's competition in 2017, and have featured in seven grand finals in that time, winning the premiership in 2021 and again in 2023, finishing runners-up on the other five occasions. They also field a reserves men's team in the Victorian Football League, and operate an under-18s academy which contests Division 2 of the men's and women's underage national championships and the Talent League.

== History of Fitzroy Football Club pre-1996, and Brisbane Bears ==
=== Fitzroy Football Club ===
The Melbourne-based Fitzroy Football Club was formed on 26 September 1883 at the Brunswick Hotel. The Victorian Football Association (VFA) made changes to their rules, allowing Fitzroy to join as the seventh club in 1884, playing in the maroon and blue colours of the local Normanby Junior Football Club.

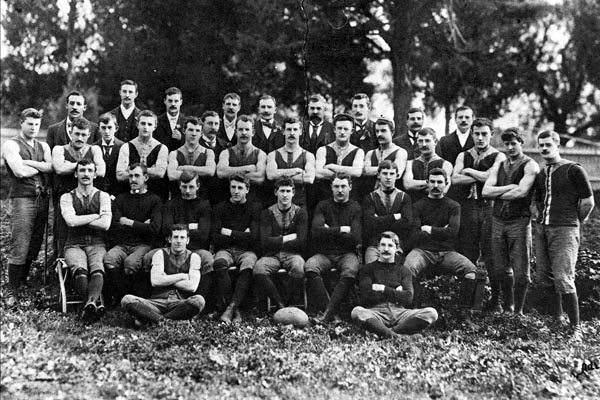
Fitzroy's 1898 premiership-winning side

They quickly became one of the most successful clubs in the VFA, consistently placing in the top four and drawing large crowds to their home at the Brunswick Street Oval in Edinburgh Gardens. This success was capped off by Fitzroy winning the VFA premiership in 1895.

Fitzroy then went on to be one of the eight break-away clubs who formed the Victorian Football League in 1897.

They continued their VFA form and became a powerhouse in the early days of the new VFL, winning a total of eight premierships, of which seven (1898, 1899, 1904, 1905, 1913, 1916 and 1922) were won while they were nicknamed the Maroons, and one (1944) as the Gorillas. The club also boasted six Brownlow Medal winners: Haydn Bunton Sr., Wilfred Smallhorn, Dinny Ryan, Allan Ruthven, Kevin Murray, and Bernie Quinlan.

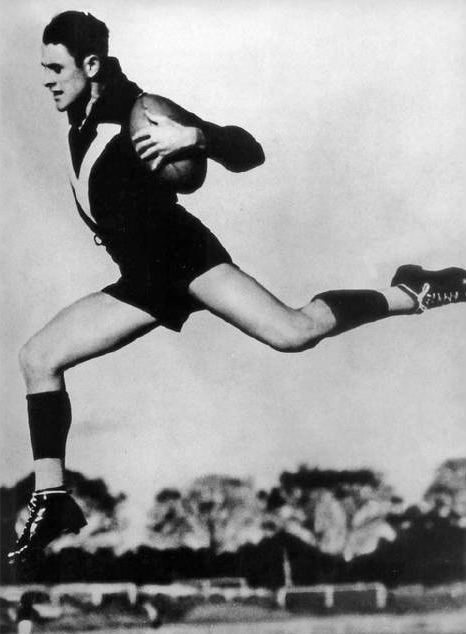
Haydn Bunton Sr. won three Brownlow Medals and two club best and fairest medals in his time at Fitzroy.

The club changed its nickname to the Lions in 1957, but when Fitzroy was evicted from its home ground of Brunswick St Oval in 1965, this began a sustained period of poor on-field performance and financial losses. Fitzroy entered one of the least successful periods any VFL/AFL club has had. The club finished in the bottom three 11 times in the 1960s and 1970s, including three wooden spoons in four years between 1963 and 1966. The club won only a single game between 1963 and 1964 – known as the Miracle Match when it defeated eventual premiers Geelong in Round 10, 1963 – but its 1964 season was winless, and as of 2023 stands as the only winless season by any club since 1950.

Despite a revival in the '80s, when the Lions made the finals four times under the coaching of Robert Walls and David Parkin, and the playing group of 1981 Brownlow Medallist Bernie Quinlan, Ron Alexander, Garry Wilson, Gary Pert and Paul Roos, the club's financial situation was perilous.

The VFL's plans to move or merge struggling Fitzroy to Brisbane pre-dated the Brisbane Bears, and negotiations between the league and the club began in 1986 with the playing group voting for a move to Brisbane. However, Fitzroy resisted the move despite significant incentives and in response, the VFL made the decision to cut any further financial assistance to the club. By the start of the 1996 season, they were almost at the end of their financial tether. With no home ground, back to back wooden spoons, and their future under a cloud, Fitzroy began to consider options for survival.

=== Brisbane Bears (1987–1996) ===
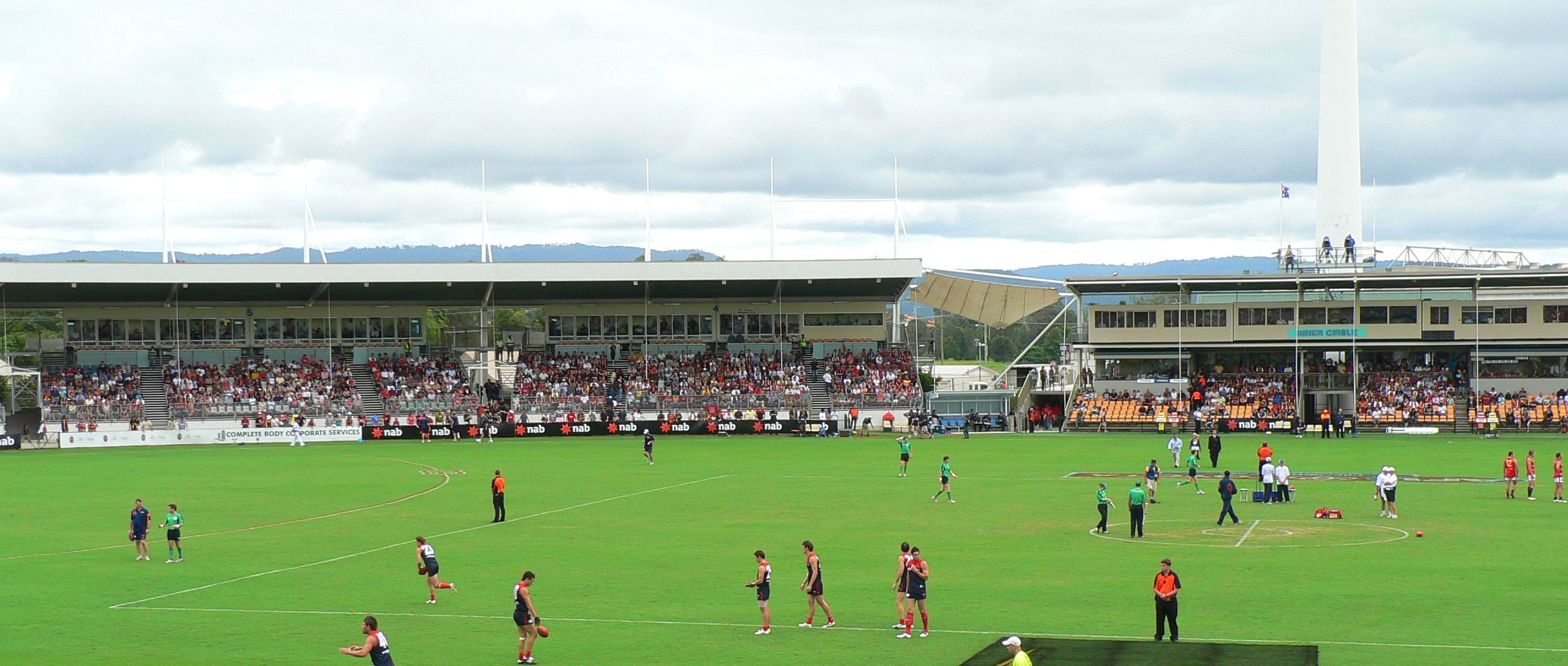
Carrara Stadium was the original home ground of the Brisbane Bears.

The Brisbane Bears were born in 1987 and initially played home matches at Carrara Stadium on the Gold Coast. In its early days, the club was uncompetitive on the field and struggled to shake the derisive tags which included "The Carrara Koalas" (in reference to the Gold Coast home and the somewhat tame marsupial) and "The Bad News Bears".

After the collapse of the business empire belonging to Bears deputy chairman Christopher Skase and the resignation of chairman Paul Cronin, the club was taken over by the AFL and re-sold to Gold Coast hospitality businessman Reuben Pelerman. Off-field, Pelerman was losing millions of dollars annually on the club and at one point in 1991 told Bears coach Robert Walls that he was closing it down. The Bears finished last in 1990 and 1991.

To survive, The Bears experimented with playing matches at the Gabba in Brisbane in 1991, moving all home matches to the venue ahead of the 1993 season. As part of the club's move to the Gabba, Pelerman agreed to release the Bears from private ownership and revert to a traditional club structure in which the club's members were able to elect the board. Membership and attendances instantly tripled now that the club was finally playing in their home city of Brisbane.

The Bears only qualified for the finals series in 1995 and 1996, and the closest the club came to a Grand Final was a preliminary final in 1996.

On extremely shaky financial ground, the Bears struggled to generate many revenue opportunities in their short and turbulent ten-year existence. Despite improving its on-field fortunes, and drafting exciting young players such as Michael Voss, Justin Leppitsch, Jason Akermanis, Darryl White, and Nigel Lappin, the club's existence was still at threat due to severe financial problems, and since 1990 the Bears had been actively exploring merger options with Fitzroy.

=== Brisbane Bears absorb Fitzroy's AFL operations, become Brisbane Lions ===
Fitzroy's directors had agreed in principle to merge with the eventual 1996 premiers, North Melbourne, as the "North-Fitzroy Kangaroos". However, that proposal was rejected 15–1 by the club presidents, reportedly out of concern that an all-Victorian merge would be too powerful. Instead, Fitzroy was placed into administration, and its administrator accepted an offer to merge its AFL operations with Brisbane.

The club became the Brisbane Bears-Fitzroy Football Club (trading as Brisbane Lions), remained at the Gabba, and were coached by Bears coach John Northey. However, the club's identity, logo, song, and guernsey were based on those of Fitzroy, three Fitzroy representatives served on the board, and the Lions kept an office in Melbourne. None of the Fitzroy representatives, former Fitzroy champion Laurie Serafini, David Lucas and Ken Levy, chosen to serve on Brisbane's board, were Fitzroy directors at that time.

Eight Fitzroy players were allowed to be recruited to the Brisbane Lions outside of the normal draft or trade system. They were Brad Boyd, Chris Johnson, Jarrod Molloy, John Barker, Nick Carter, Simon Hawking, Scott Bamford and Shane Clayton.

Fitzroy played its last VFL/AFL game on 1 September 1996 against Fremantle at Subiaco Oval, and the Bears' last match was a preliminary final on Saturday 21 September 1996 at the Melbourne Cricket Ground against North Melbourne.

The Brisbane Lions were officially launched on 1 November 1996, joining the national competition in 1997.

== Brisbane Lions history ==
Chart of yearly ladder positions for Brisbane Lions in AFL

=== Beginnings: 1997–2000 ===
In 1997, the Lions narrowly made the finals, finishing eighth. They ended up with the same win–loss record as fellow 1997 newcomers Port Adelaide, who missed out due to having an inferior percentage. Their first two games were against the eventual grand finalists of that year, Adelaide and St Kilda. They went down to Adelaide by 36 points before recording an emphatic 97-point thrashing of St Kilda in round 2. The Lions met St Kilda again in a cut-throat away qualifying final, going down by 46 points after leading the Saints at half-time. The Brisbane Lions in 1997 remain the only team in VFL/AFL history to have made the finals in their first season.

Despite a talented playing list, the disruption of the merger and injuries to key players Michael Voss and Brad Boyd took their toll. The Lions finished last at the end of the 1998 season. Accordingly, Northey was sacked as coach with eight rounds remaining in the season. During the off-season, the club hired Leigh Matthews, who in 1990 had delivered Collingwood its first premiership since 1958.

Matthews, who was voted "Player of the Century" in 2000, played his entire career with Hawthorn and brought many of the Hawthorn disciplines to the Lions. Importantly, he forced the Lions to embrace and acknowledge their Fitzroy heritage with murals and records being erected at the Gabba, and past players names being placed on lockers. Within a year, the Lions rose from the bottom of the ladder to fourth. The 1999 season included a Round 20 Gabba match where the Lions led Fremantle by 113 points at half-time after having kicked 21 goals. Their half-time score of 21.5 (131) still remains the highest half-time score in VFL/AFL history. Brisbane won their first finals as a merged entity against Carlton and the Western Bulldogs before losing to the eventual premiers, the Kangaroos, in a 1999 preliminary final. The Lions played finals again in 2000 but bowed out in the second week after losing an away game to Carlton by 82 points.

In this period the club drafted and recruited key players who went on to be pillars of the Lions triple premiership years. Victorian Luke Power, Fitzroy father–son selection Jonathan Brown, and exciting WA product Simon Black came via the draft, and Brad Scott, Mal Michael, and ex-Fitzroy B&F winner Martin Pike were recruited from Hawthorn, Collingwood, and North Melbourne respectively.

=== Triple premiership success: 2001–2004 ===
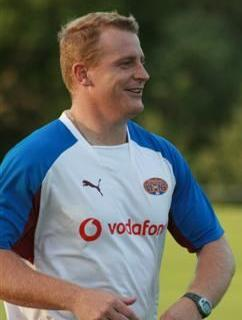
Michael Voss captained Brisbane to three successive premierships.

The Lions began 2001 by making the final of the Ansett Australia Cup, their first pre-season grand final. They went down by 85 points away to Port Adelaide, who they had also been scheduled to play in Round 1 at the same venue. After an inconsistent start to their 2001 season, the Lions took on the reigning premiers Essendon in Round 10. Brisbane finished as 28-point victors, and head coach Leigh Matthews famously used a Predator quote, "if it bleeds, we can kill it", to inspire his team for the game. The Lions then won 16 games straight, finishing the year undefeated and booking their place in the 2001 AFL Grand Final to play Essendon.

Going in as underdogs, Brisbane started the game well, scoring the first goal of the match from a free kick awarded to Alastair Lynch for holding against Dustin Fletcher. Essendon fought back late in the first quarter and then took control of the game in the second term. The Lions' poor kicking for goal almost put them out of the game in the second quarter as Essendon blew their lead out to 20 points late in the term.

| 2001 AFL Grand Final | G | B | Total |
| Brisbane Lions | 15 | 18 | 108 |
| Essendon | 12 | 10 | 82 |
| Venue: MCG | Crowd: 91,482 |

However, The Lions managed to overrun Essendon in the third term, kicking six goals to one and turning a 14-point deficit into a 16-point lead. Brisbane's pace in the midfield and the tiring legs of most of the Essendon players played a pivotal role in them taking full control of the game in the second half. The Lions won their first premiership comfortably, with a final score of 15.18 (108) to 12.10 (82).

The win was topped off with Lions utility player Shaun Hart winning the Norm Smith Medal after being judged best on ground in the Grand Final.

| 2002 AFL Grand Final | G | B | Total |
| Brisbane Lions | 10 | 15 | 75 |
| Collingwood | 9 | 12 | 66 |
| Venue: MCG | Crowd: 91,817 |

In 2002, the Lions won a club-record 17 games, spending most of the season firmly entrenched in the top two with Port Adelaide. They narrowly missed out on the minor premiership following a final round defeat to the Power in Adelaide. In the finals, the Lions claimed easy home victories over the two Adelaide-based teams on their way to a second consecutive Grand Final. They faced Collingwood, who had surprised many that year after having missed the finals the previous seven seasons. Brisbane ended up defeating the Magpies 9.12 (66) to 10.15 (75) in cold and wet conditions at the Melbourne Cricket Ground. Early in the contest, the Lions lost both ruckman Beau McDonald and utility player Martin Pike to injury and had to complete the match with a limited bench.

| 2003 AFL Grand Final | G | B | Total |
| Brisbane Lions | 20 | 14 | 134 |
| Collingwood | 12 | 12 | 84 |
| Venue: MCG | Crowd: 79,451 |

In 2003, the Lions became the first team in the national era to win three consecutive premierships. With a number of players under an injury cloud—and having lost to Collingwood in a qualifying final at the Melbourne Cricket Ground three weeks previously–the Lions went into the game as underdogs. However, they sealed their place in history as an AFL dynasty by thrashing the Magpies in cool but sunny conditions. At one stage in the final quarter, the Lions led by almost 80 points before relaxing when the match was well and truly won, allowing Collingwood to score the last four goals. The final score of 20.14 (134) to 12.12 (84) saw the club become only the fourth in VFL/AFL history to win three consecutive premierships and the first since the creation of the AFL. Simon Black claimed the Norm Smith Medal with a dominant 39-possession match, the most possessions ever gathered by a player in a grand final; the record was equalled by Melbourne's Christian Petracca 18 years later in the 2021 Grand Final.

| 2004 AFL Grand Final | G | B | Total |
| Port Adelaide | 17 | 11 | 113 |
| Brisbane Lions | 10 | 13 | 73 |
| Venue: MCG | Crowd: 77,671 |

The 2004 season saw Brisbane remain in the top portion of the ladder for most of the season. Reaching the finals in second position, Brisbane controversially had to travel to Melbourne to play against Geelong in the preliminary final due to a contract between the Melbourne Cricket Ground (MCG) and the Australian Football League (AFL) that required one preliminary final to be played each year at the MCG. Port Adelaide had finished on top of the ladder and hosted the other preliminary final in Adelaide. Former player Jason Akermanis has since claimed that coach Leigh Matthews was furious over the preliminary final location decision. Despite this setback, Brisbane beat Geelong and reached the grand final for the fourth consecutive year. Their opponents, Port Adelaide, playing in their first grand final, were too good on the day and recorded a 40-point win in what was the first-ever all-non-Victorian grand final. The grand final is partly remembered for a wild punch-up between Port Adelaide's Darryl Wakelin and Alastair Lynch, who was playing in his last ever game and therefore immune from suspension.

=== Rebuild and Michael Voss: 2005–2013 ===
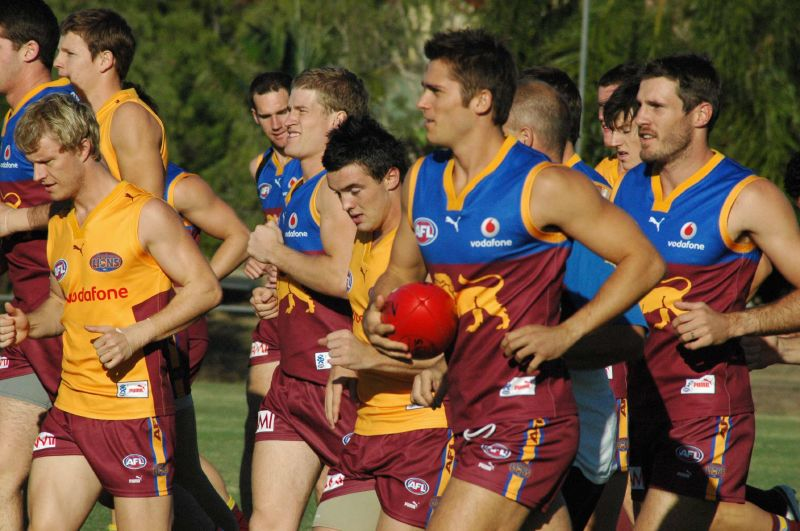
Players training in 2007

The Lions endured a slow start to the 2005 season before having a form reversal towards the end of the year, which included ten-goal thrashings of top-four contenders Geelong and Melbourne. Going into Round 20, they were half a game clear inside the top eight and had one of the strongest percentages in the league. However, they lost their final three games and miss the finals, with their season culminating in a record-breaking 139-point loss to St Kilda at the Telstra Dome. It remains the club's heaviest defeat, in addition to being the largest victory in the over-100-year history of St Kilda. Some believed that the St Kilda game, rather than the 2004 Grand Final, had signaled the end of Brisbane's triple premiership dynasty.

The Lions began the 2006 season optimistically, but injuries plagued the club as they again missed the finals, with Brisbane's players recording an AFL record total of 200 matches lost to injury for the season.

The Brisbane Lions' 2007 season started with them finishing runners-up to Carlton in the 2007 NAB Cup Grand Final. The Lions failed to make the finals for a third successive year, again showing promising glimpses at stages, with a shock away win against reigning premiers the West Coast Eagles, and a 93-point hiding of finalists Collingwood at the MCG. They made history in 2007 by becoming the first club in the history of the AFL to have five co-captains.

The team struggled during the 2008 season and missed out on the finals with a 10–12 record, losing 3 games despite having at least 5 more scoring shots in each of those games. Following the season, Coach Leigh Matthews resigned after 10 seasons and 3 premierships with the club. The Lions appointed former player and Captain Michael Voss as the coach ahead of 2009.

After only winning 2 games from the first 5 played in 2009, the club won 9 of the next 12 to sit in 6th on the ladder, where they finished the season. They also recorded a strong victory over eventual premiers Geelong during this timeframe by 43 points. The club beat Carlton in their Elimination Final, coming from 30 points behind in the final quarter to win by 7 points, before losing to the Western Bulldogs in a Semi Final.

The 2009/2010 off-season was dominated by the arrival of Brendan Fevola from Carlton, with a belief in the club that Fevola could help them capitalise and improve upon their strong 2009 season. Indeed, the Lions won their first four matches of the 2010 season to be top of the ladder after four rounds, but they only won three more games after that, to finish 13th by the end of the season.

The Lions' 2010/2011 off-season was disrupted by the sacking of Fevola after just one season at the Lions, following repeated off-field indiscretions which included getting drunk in the Brisbane streets during New Year's Eve celebrations. On the field, the Lions won only four games for the year and finished 15th overall. The 2011 season saw the debut of another Queensland-based team, the Gold Coast Suns. The Suns, who were coming off a 139-point loss to Essendon the previous week, upset the Lions by 8 points in their first encounter. Despite their worst season since 1998, coach Michael Voss was granted a contract extension after the board recommended that Voss was the best man to take the club forward into the future. Leading into season 2012, only two players from the triple-premiership-winning team of 2001–2003 remained: Simon Black and Jonathan Brown.

The 2013 season started well for Brisbane, defeating Carlton in the final of the NAB Cup, with Daniel Rich winning the Michael Tuck Medal for best on ground. However, the club began its 2013 season with back-to-back losses to the Western Bulldogs and Adelaide. Injuries took a toll on the team, with young players Claye Beams and Jared Polec suffering severe injuries. In Round 13, Brisbane defeated second-placed Geelong, coming from 52 points down late in the third quarter to win by 5 points due to an Ash McGrath goal after the siren in his 200th match, in what became known as the Miracle on Grass.

On 13 August 2013, coach Michael Voss was told his contract would not be renewed.

On 18 October 2013, Brisbane Lions Hall of Famer Simon Black announced his retirement.

=== Playing under Justin Leppitsch: 2014–2016 ===
On 25 August 2013, a former premiership player for the Lions, Justin Leppitsch, was confirmed as the senior coach of the Lions for the next three seasons.

During Round 13, 2014 Lions captain Jonathan Brown was the victim of a facial injury in a clash between the Lions and the Greater Western Sydney Giants. He collided with Tomas Bugg's knee and was taken off the ground. He suffered a concussion and subsequently retired from football. His retirement, alongside the retirement of Ash McGrath, meant there were no players from the triple-premiership era remaining at the club.

On 29 August 2016, just one day after the end of the club's season, Leppitsch was sacked as coach of the Lions after multiple disappointing seasons, despite being granted a one-year contract extension at the start of the year which would have seen him remain at the club until the end of the 2017 season.

=== Building under Chris Fagan: 2017–2022 ===
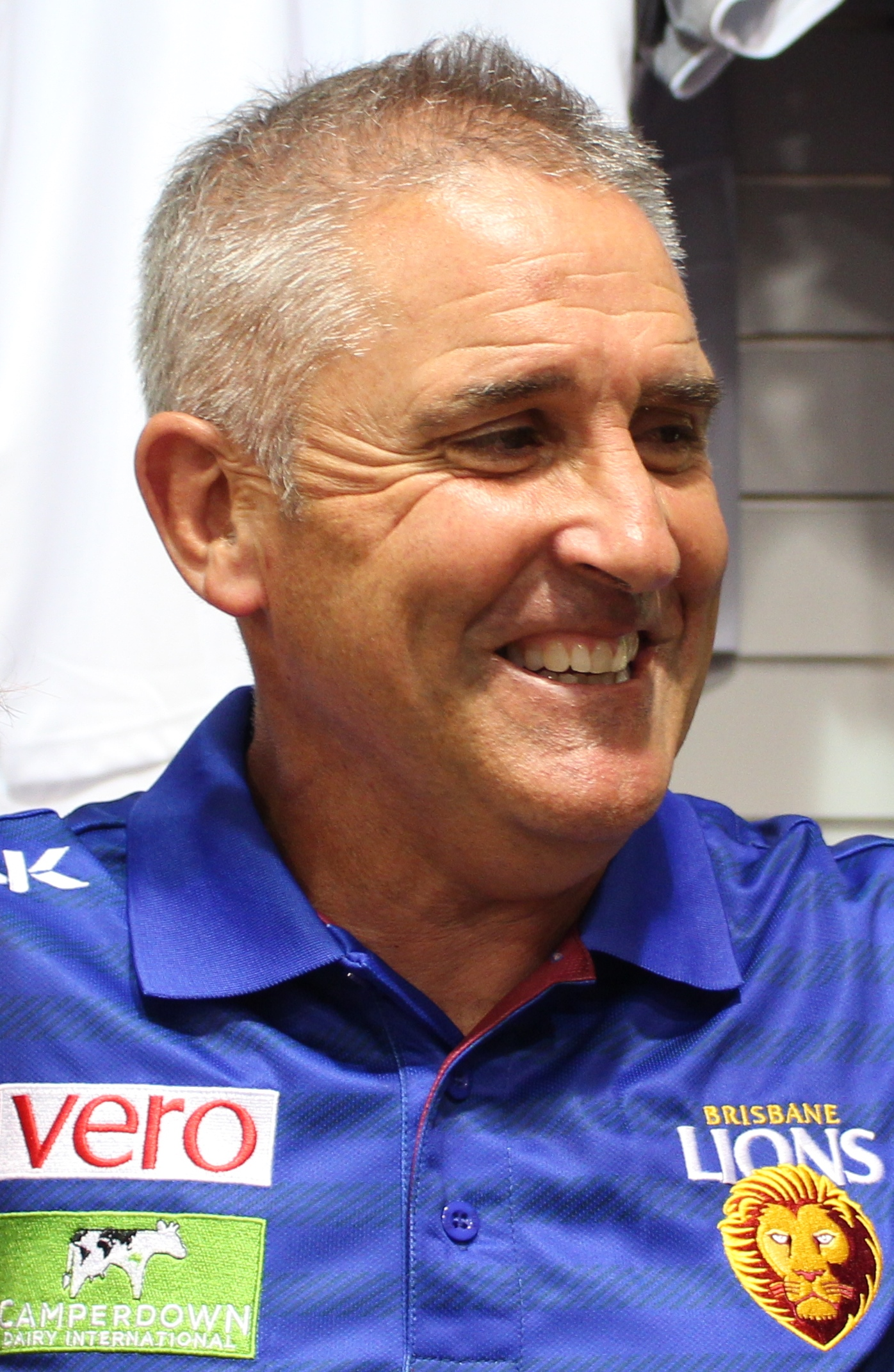
Coach Chris Fagan

On 4 October 2016, Hawthorn football manager Chris Fagan was announced as Brisbane's senior coach from the 2017 season onwards.

The Lions claimed the 2017 wooden spoon, despite winning 5 games for the season, 2 more than the previous season. Their percentage of 74.3 was the worst in the league, behind Fremantle with a percentage of 74.4. The 2018 season was very similar, recording 5 wins to finish in 15th place, but multiple close losses showed signs of a young team about to breakout into finals contention.

The Lions had a dramatically improved 2019 season, making the finals for the first time since 2009 and finishing second on the AFL ladder with 16 wins, behind minor premiers Geelong on percentage. However, Brisbane were bundled out of the finals in straight sets at the Gabba, losing to eventual premiers Richmond by 47 points in their qualifying final and then to eventual runners-up Greater Western Sydney by three points in their semi-final due to a late Brent Daniels goal. The Lions became the first team since Geelong in 1997 to finish second on the ladder and not progress to a preliminary final.

Brisbane repeated their form displayed in 2019 the following year, once again finishing second on percentage at the conclusion of the home-and-away season, which, due to the COVID-19 pandemic, was mostly played in south-east Queensland. They won 14 games in a shortened 17-game season. During their qualifying final, they defeated Richmond for the first time since 2009 and qualified for a preliminary final berth, but were beaten by a more experienced Geelong side in that match, thus missing out on the once-in-a-lifetime opportunity to play for a premiership in their own Gabba backyard.

After an inconsistent start to the 2021 season the Lions hit form, winning seven straight games to sit in the top four for most of the year. However, losses to Melbourne, Richmond, Hawthorn and St Kilda meant the Lions sat in fifth as of the final round.

With the double chance on the line, the Lions regained fourth spot in the dying seconds of their final home-and-away game against West Coast. A behind kicked by Lincoln McCarthy put them ahead of the fourth-placed Bulldogs by a single point of ladder percentage, and a goal after the siren from Charlie Cameron then sealed the result for the Lions, who finished in the top four for the third year running under Chris Fagan. However, the Lions bowed out in straight sets for the second time in three years after suffering losses to eventual premiers Melbourne and eventual runners-up Western Bulldogs in the finals, with the latter winning by a single point, due to a contentious free kick paid to the Bulldogs in the final seconds of the game.

Brisbane reached the finals once again in 2022, but this time missed the top four. With a win-loss record of fifteen wins and seven losses, the Lions finished sixth and hosted seventh-placed Richmond at the Gabba in an Elimination Final. After a close game which had 17 lead changes, the Lions prevailed, defeating the Tigers by a margin of two points in a 106–104 victory thanks to a late Joe Daniher goal. The Lions then played the Melbourne Demons in the Semi-Final, and upset the reigning premiers against all odds, bundling them out in straight sets with a score of 92–79 to progress to their second Preliminary Final under Fagan, taking on Geelong once again in a rematch of the 2020 Preliminary Final.

Unfortunately for Brisbane, their impressive finals run came to an end against the Cats, suffering a 71-point defeat in the First Preliminary Final that ended their 2022 season.

=== Four grand finals in a row under Fagan, back-to-back-to-back premiers: 2023–2026 ===
==== 2023 ====
Brisbane reinforced their squad with multiple star signings in the off-season, such as gun midfielder Josh Dunkley, tall forward Jack Gunston and father–son draftee Will Ashcroft, to make them one of the competition's flag favourites for the 2023 AFL season. Additionally, Fagan also penned a two-year contract extension to keep him at the club until 2025, with Lachie Neale and Harris Andrews also taking over as co-captains from long-serving Lions veteran Dayne Zorko, who stepped down before the commencement of the 2023 season.

Brisbane finished the 2023 Home & Away season in second position, finishing in the Top 2 for the third time under Fagan after previously doing so in 2019 and 2020, and finishing in the Top 4 for the fourth time after also doing so in 2021. They faced Port Adelaide in the Second Qualifying Final on the 9th of September at the Gabba, beating the Power by 48 points and going straight through to a home preliminary final, their third under Fagan, where they faced Carlton on the 23rd of September for a place in the 2023 AFL Grand Final.

After conceding the first five goals, The Lions fought back, prevailing by 16 points over the Blues to progress to the AFL Grand Final for the first time since 2004. This meant that they faced Collingwood, exactly 20 years on since they faced the Magpies in the 2003 Grand Final and completed the historic three-peat.

| 2023 AFL Grand Final | G | B | Total |
| Collingwood | 12 | 18 | 90 |
| Brisbane Lions | 13 | 8 | 86 |
| Venue: MCG | Crowd: 100,024 |

The Lions fell short of the premiership in 2023, losing to the Magpies in an extremely close Grand Final with a final score of 12.18.(90) to 13.8.(86).

==== 2024 ====
The Lions had a rough start to the 2024 season, starting 2–5 and suffering multiple season-ending injuries to best-23 players, and sitting in 13th by the conclusion of Round 13. However, the Lions would rally post-bye, at one stage stringing together a nine-game win streak and sitting as high as second on the ladder. The Lions would eventually finish fifth on the ladder with a home and away record of 14–8–1, qualifying for finals for the sixth successive season and locking in a home Elimination Final at the Gabba against Carlton. After being up 60–0 in the second quarter, the Lions coasted home to a winning margin of 14.15.(99) to 11.5.(71) to progress to the second week of finals, where they met Greater Western Sydney in an away Semi-Final.

The Lions made history against the Giants in the Semi-Final, after trailing by as much as 44 points midway through the third quarter and still managing to prevail, defeating the Giants 15.15. (105) to 15.10. (100) to record one of the biggest finals comebacks of all time. Their victory meant that they progressed to their fourth Preliminary Final under Fagan, facing Geelong in a Preliminary Final at the MCG. The Lions came back from a 25-point deficit to defeat the Cats 14.11. (95) to 12.13. (85) to progress to their second straight Grand Final under Fagan.

| 2024 AFL Grand Final | G | B | Total |
| Brisbane Lions | 18 | 12 | 120 |
| Sydney Swans | 9 | 6 | 60 |
| Venue: MCG | Crowd: 100,013 |

The Lions faced off against Sydney in the 2024 AFL Grand Final, thumping the Swans with a score of 18.12. (120) to 9.6. (60), avenging their loss in 2023 and claiming the club's first premiership since 2003. The Lions became the second side under the current finals system to win the premiership from outside the Top Four, after the Western Bulldogs in 2016. Will Ashcroft claimed the Norm Smith Medal as the best afield, winning the award at the age of 20, the second youngest player to do so in VFL/AFL history, after Carlton's Wayne Harmes in the 1979 VFL Grand Final, who was 19 at the time.

==== 2025 ====
In Round 23 of the 2025 AFL season, the Lions defeated Fremantle by 57 points to secure finals for the seventh straight season, a club record. In Round 24, the final round of the home and away season, they defeated the Hawks by 10 points to finish the season third on the ladder, finishing in the Top 4 for the fifth time under Fagan and progressing to an away Qualifying Final against Geelong at the MCG.

The Lions' 2025 finals series did not begin the way they had hoped, with the Cats defeating them by 38 points with a scoreline of 16.16. (112) to 11.8. (74). This meant the Lions hosted the Gold Coast Suns in a home Semi-Final for the first ever QClash final. The Lions comprehensively defeated the Suns by 53 points, winning 14.16 (100) to 6.11. (47) to progress to their fourth straight Preliminary Final and fifth total under Fagan, where they took on Collingwood at the MCG in an effort to make their third consecutive Grand Final. The Lions defeated the Pies by 29 points, winning 15.10. (100) to 11.5. (71) to progress to their third Grand Final in a row under Fagan.

The Lions faced the Geelong Cats in the 2025 AFL Grand Final in a rematch of their Week 1 Qualifying Final. The Lions thumped the Cats, winning 18.14. (122) to 11.9. (75) to defend their 2024 premiership and go back-to-back. Will Ashcroft claimed the Norm Smith Medal as the best afield for the second straight year, becoming one of five players to win the medal multiple times and one of three players to win it in two consecutive years. The Lions' 2025 victory was their fifth flag overall, making them the most successful non-Victorian AFL club in history, and the most successful of the 21st century; no other club has won five premierships since the turn of the century, with Geelong and Hawthorn the closest with four each. The win also saw them become the joint-most successful club of the AFL era (1990–present), alongside Hawthorn, and sees them have the best frequency for winning a premiership of any club across the entire competition (5 in 29 completed AFL seasons). The Lions' back-to-back premierships saw them become the fourth group to capture consecutive premierships in the 21st century, following Brisbane 2001–03, Hawthorn 2013–15 and Richmond 2019–20. Brisbane's 2025 premiership victory was notable for having eight players under the age of 22, headlined by Norm Smith winner Ashcroft.

| 2025 AFL Grand Final | G | B | Total |
| Brisbane Lions | 18 | 14 | 122 |
| Geelong | 11 | 9 | 75 |
| Venue: MCG | Crowd: 100,022 |

==== 2026 ====
Ahead of the 2026 season, the Lions strengthened their squad in a bid to win a third successive premiership. Additions included West Coast captain Oscar Allen, Essendon ruckman Sam Draper and number 6 draft pick and academy graduate Daniel Annable. Lachie Neale stood down as co-captain ahead of the 2026 season, with Josh Dunkley and Hugh McCluggage both being appointed as co-captains alongside Harris Andrews for a total of three captains.

On March 24, the Lions released the first renders of Brisbane Olympic Stadium, the 63,000 seater stadium that will become their new home from the 2033 AFL season.

In round 21, despite a heavy 76-point loss to Carlton, other results in the round ensured that the Lions would qualify for finals for a club record-extending eighth consecutive season. In round 24, the Lions thumped Collingwood by 63 points at the MCG to finish third on the ladder and secure a top four finish; this was their sixth top four finish in eight finals series under Fagan.

Brisbane's 2026 finals campaign began against the Sydney Swans in an away qualifying final at the SCG, where the Lions were comprehensively defeated by 53 points. The Lions then hosted a home semi final at the Gabba against the Adelaide Crows, where they demolished the Crows by 53 points, winning 21.18. (144) to 13.13. (91). Brisbane's victory meant that they played Hawthorn in an away preliminary final at the MCG; their sixth preliminary final total under Fagan, it was their fifth consecutive, an equal record under the current finals system, joining Geelong's 2007–2011 and Hawthorn's 2011–2015 streaks. This was the first time that Brisbane and Hawthorn had met in finals football.

Brisbane defeated Hawthorn 20.11. (131) to 19.8. (122) to progress to the 2026 AFL Grand Final, their fourth consecutive grand final, where they faced Fremantle in their quest to capture a third consecutive premiership. This was the first time that Brisbane and Fremantle have met in finals football, leaving the West Coast Eagles as the only team the Lions have never contested a final against. Brisbane's 2023–2026 team became the third group in the AFL era to compete in four grand finals in a row, after Brisbane 2001–2004 and Hawthorn 2012–2015.

Brisbane defeated Fremantle 14.12 (96) to 12.17 (89) to win their third premiership in a row, completing a second three-peat. Brisbane were trailing by 17 points with almost 22 minutes elapsed in the final quarter, but kicked four goals in a row within 4 minutes to win. This then made the Lions the most successful club this century and in the AFL era, having won 6 premierships in 30 seasons.

| 2026 AFL Grand Final | G | B | Total |
| Brisbane Lions | 14 | 12 | 96 |
| Fremantle | 12 | 17 | 89 |
| Venue: MCG | Crowd: 100,023 |

On October 1 2026, Fagan announced that he would be stepping down as coach of the Brisbane Lions after ten seasons at the helm.

=== Cameron Bruce era (2027–present) ===
On November 10 2026, it was announced that Cameron Bruce would become the new head coach of the Lions, signing a three year contract. Bruce had been a senior assistant at the club since 2022.

== Membership base and sponsorship ==
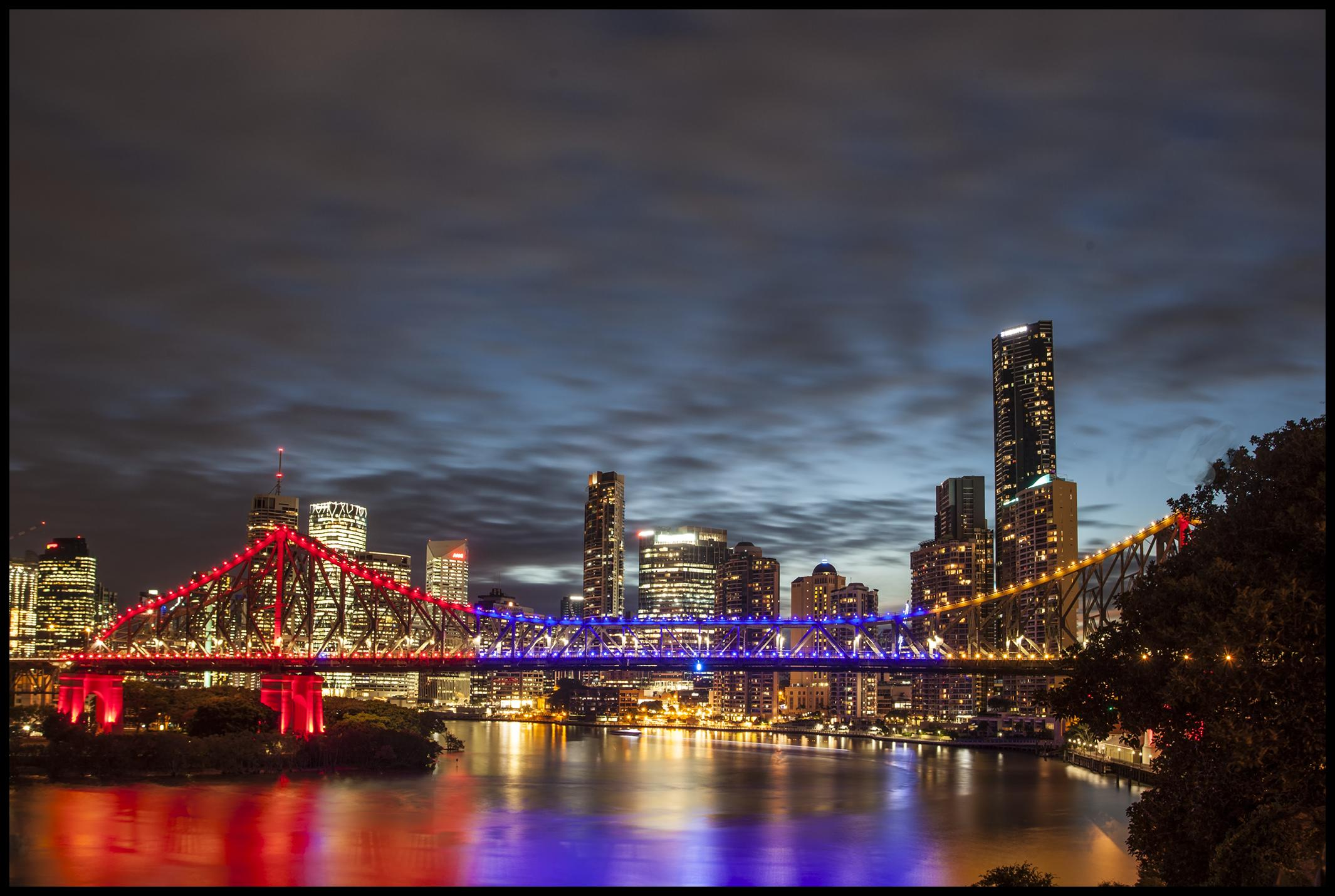
Brisbane's Story Bridge in the colours of the Lions, 2016

Crowds and memberships for the Brisbane Lions grew dramatically during the four seasons in which they made the AFL Grand Final in the early 2000s.

The club still maintains healthy Victorian support, hitting 10,000 Victorian members in the 2024 season. The Royal Derby Hotel in Fitzroy is the official social venue for Victorian Lions fans, showing all televised games, and displaying a mural of club greats Kevin Murray, Jonathan Brown, and Chris Johnson on its Alexandra Parade side.

To add to this presence in Melbourne, the Lions Historical Society is based at Etihad Stadium, containing exhibits from Fitzroy, the Bears, and the Brisbane Lions.

During the 2024-2026 premiership years, the suburb of Fitzroy became a hub of support for the Brisbane Lions, with fans from Queensland and Melbourne all flocking to the pubs and bars of Brunswick Street to experience the Grand Final festivities in the club's Victorian heartland. The massive influx of supporters enabled the club to run a pop up store at Fitzroy Town Hall, and the town hall itself flies a Lions flag during finals to honour the Brisbane Lions connection to Fitzroy.

A 2000 Roy Morgan AFL survey of household incomes suggested that Brisbane Lions supporters were among the lowest-earning supporters in the league.

| Year | Members | Change from previous season | Finishing position | Finals result/Wooden spoon | Average home crowd | Profit (loss) |
|---|---|---|---|---|---|---|
| 1997 | 16,769 | —N/a | 8th | Qualifying finalists | 19,550 | $1,500,000 (Note: includes $6 million from AFL for Brisbane Bears–Fitzroy merger) |
| 1998 | 16,108 | ▼661 | 16th | Wooden spoon | 16,675 | Unknown |
| 1999 | 16,931 | ▲823 | 3rd | Preliminary finalists | 21,890 | Unknown |
| 2000 | 20,295 | ▲3,364 | 6th | Semi-finalists | 27,406 | Unknown |
| 2001 | 18,330 | ▼1,965 | **2nd** | **Premiers** | 27,638 | ($845,000) |
| 2002 | 22,288 | ▲3,958 | **2nd** | **Premiers** | 26,895 | 1,200,000 |
| 2003 | 24,365 | ▲2,077 | 3rd | **Premiers** | 31,717 | $2,200,000 |
| 2004 | 30,941 | ▲6,576 | **2nd** | Grand finalists | **33,619** | $2,170,000 |
| 2005 | 28,913 | ▼1,308 | 11th | —N/a | 33,267 | $1,450,000 |
| 2006 | 26,459 | ▼2,454 | 13th | —N/a | 28,630 | ~(1,000,000) |
| 2007 | 21,976 | ▼4,483 | 10th | —N/a | 28,848 | $1,058,000 |
| 2008 | 22,737 | ▲761 | 10th | —N/a | 28,128 | ($2,200,030) |
| 2009 | 24,873 | ▲2,136 | 6th | Semi-finalists | 29,172 | ($603,207) |
| 2010 | 26,779 | ▲1,906 | 13th | —N/a | 29,933 | ($2,713,848) |
| 2011 | 22,338 | ▼4,441 | 15th | —N/a | 20,462 | ($1,855,926) |
| 2012 | 20,762 | ▼1,576 | 13th | —N/a | 20,344 | ($2,513,262) |
| 2013 | 24,130 | ▲3,368 | 12th | —N/a | 21,083 | ($1,574,762) |
| 2014 | 24,012 | ▼118 | 15th | —N/a | 19,743 | ($3,543,138) |
| 2015 | 25,408 | ▲1,396 | 17th | —N/a | 18,810 | ($681,053) |
| 2016 | 23,286 | ▼2,122 | 17th | —N/a | 17,074 | ($1,783,506) |
| 2017 | 21,362 | ▼1,924 | 18th | Wooden spoon | 16,455 | ($2,261,990) |
| 2018 | 24,867 | ▲3,505 | 15th | —N/a | 18,405 | ($230,641) |
| 2019 | 28,821 | ▲3,954 | **2nd** | Semi-finalists | 24,741 | $648,618 |
| 2020 | 29,277 | ▲456 | **2nd** | Preliminary finalists | 10,648 (Note: Due to the COVID-19 pandemic, there were capped crowd capacities during the 2020 season) | $3,073,413 |
| 2021 | 40,289 | ▲11,012 | 4th | Semi-finalists | 20,603 | $2,938,037 (Note: excludes ~$15 million grant funding for construction of Springfield training ground) |
| 2022 | 43,319 | ▲3,030 | 6th | Preliminary finalists | 25,818 | $2,384,997 (Note: excludes ~$13 million in grant funding for construction of Springfield training ground) |
| 2023 | 52,373 | ▲9,054 | **2nd** | Grand finalists | 27,455 | $633,056 |
| 2024 | 63,268 | ▲10,895 | 5th | **Premiers** | 29,045 | $4,492,000 |
| 2025 | 75,115 | ▲**11,847** | 3rd | **Premiers** | 30,598 | **$9,785,000** |
| 2026 | **85,103** | ▲9,988 | 3rd | **Premiers** | 31,456 |

Statistics highlighted in bold denote the best known season for Brisbane in that category
Statistics highlighted in italic denote the worst known season for Brisbane in that category

=== Non-playing/coaching staff ===
| Name | Position |
|---|---|
| Sam Graham | Chief executive officer |
| Andrew Wellington | Chairman |
| Sarah Kelly | Deputy chairman |
| Tim Forrester | Directors |
| Dean Gibson | Directors |
| Maxine Horne | Directors |
| Cyril Jinks | Directors |
| Chris Johnson | Directors |
| Leigh Matthews | Directors |
| Mick Power | Directors |
| Cathie Reid | Directors |
| Danny Daly | General Manager of Football |
| Dom Ambrogio | List Manager |
| Andrew Crowell | Personal excellence and wellbeing manager |
| Damien Austin | Head of high performance |
| Stephen Conole | National recruiting manager |
| Leon Harris | Recruiter |
| Shane Rogers | Pro scout |

=== Sponsorship ===
==== AFL ====
| Year | Kit manufacturer | Major sponsor | | Shorts sponsor | Back sponsor | | Above-number sponsor | Neckline sponsor |
| Year | Kit manufacturer | Home | Away | Shorts sponsor | Home | Away | Above-number sponsor | Neckline sponsor |
|---|---|---|---|---|---|---|---|---|
| 1997–98 | Puma | Carlton & United Breweries | | Spam | Coca-Cola | | — | — |
| 1999 | Puma | Carlton & United Breweries | | Devine Homes | Coca-Cola | | — | — |
| 2000 | Puma | AAPT | | Spam | Cellular One | | — | — |
| 2001 | Russell Athletic | AAPT | | Bio Organics Vitamins | AAPT Cellular One | | — | — |
| 2002 | Russell Athletic | AAPT | | AAMI | AAPT Cellular One | | — | — |
| 2003–06 | Russell Athletic | AAPT | | AAMI | AAPT | | — | — |
| 2007 | Puma | Vodafone | | AAMI | Vodafone | | — | — |
| 2008 | Puma | Vodafone | | HBA | Vodafone | | — | — |
| 2009 | Puma | Vodafone | | MBF | Vodafone | | — | — |
| 2010 | Puma | Bank of Queensland | Conergy | MBF | Conergy | Bank of Queensland | — | — |
| 2011–12 | Kooga | Bank of Queensland | Conergy | Bupa | Conergy | Bank of Queensland | — | — |
| 2013 | Kooga | Vero Insurance | National Storage | Bupa | National Storage | Vero Insurance | — | — |
| 2014 | BLK | Vero Insurance | National Storage | TechnologyOne | National Storage | Vero Insurance | — | — |
| 2015 | BLK | Vero Insurance | National Storage | Garuda Indonesia | National Storage | Vero Insurance | — | — |
| 2016 | BLK | Vero Insurance | Camperdown Dairy International | – | Camperdown Dairy International | Vero Insurance | — | — |
| 2017 | Majestic Athletic | Vero Insurance | Camperdown Dairy International | XXXX | Camperdown Dairy International | Vero Insurance | — | — |
| 2018 | Majestic Athletic | Vero Insurance | Oaks Hotels & Resorts | XXXX | Oaks Hotels & Resorts | Vero Insurance | — | — |
| 2019 | Majestic Athletic | Neds (Note: For a short period in the 2018–19 off-season, from November '18 to March '19, SOOW were Brisbane's home major sponsor and away back sponsor; however, the contract with SOOW was cancelled before the first game of the home-and-away season was played.) | Oaks Hotels & Resorts | The Coffee Club | Oaks Hotels & Resorts | Neds | — | — |
| 2020 | Classic Sportswear | XL Express | Neds | The Coffee Club | Neds | XL Express | — | — |
| 2021 | Classic Sportswear | XL Express | Neds | Taubmans | Neds | XL Express | — | — |
| 2022 | Classic Sportswear | XL Express | Youi | Taubmans | Youi | XL Express | Hyundai | — |
| 2023–24 | New Balance | Caltex | Youi | XXXX | Youi | Caltex | Hyundai | McDonald's |
| 2025 | New Balance | Youi | | XXXX | Youi | | Hyundai | McDonald's |

==== AFL Women's ====
| Year | Kit manufacturer | Major sponsor | Shorts sponsor | Back sponsor | Above-number sponsor |
|---|---|---|---|---|---|
| 2017 | Cotton On | Hyundai | Austraffic | Hyundai | – |
| 2018 | Cotton On | Hyundai | Austraffic | Bond University | – |
| 2019–20 | Cotton On | Icon Group | Austraffic | Bond University | – |
| 2021 | Cotton On | Price Attack | Austraffic | Bond University | – |
| 2022 (S6) | Cotton On | Price Attack | Austraffic | Bond University | Hastings Deering |
| 2022 (S7)–23 | Cotton On | BMD | Austraffic | Bond University | Hastings Deering |
| 2024– | Cotton On | BMD | Youi | Bond University | Hastings Deering |

== Relationship with the Fitzroy Football Club ==
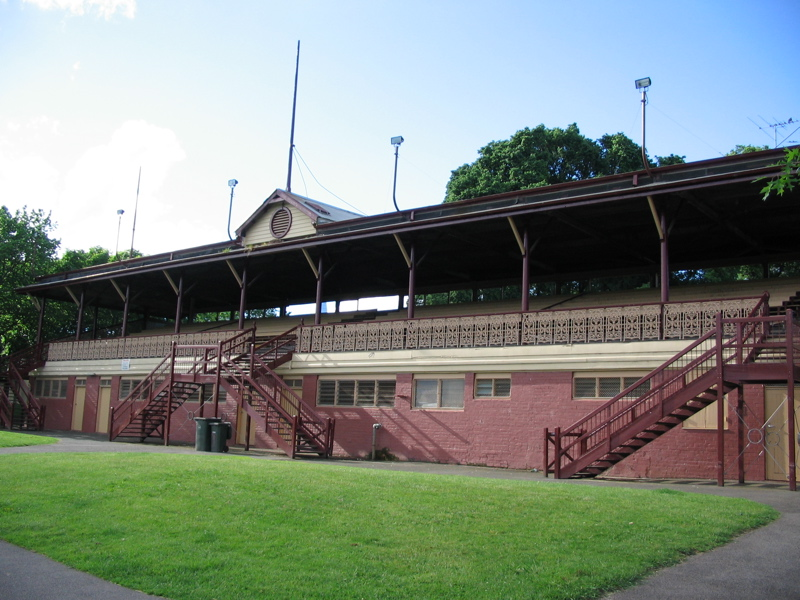
Brunswick Street Oval has been called the spiritual home of both Fitzroy and the Brisbane Lions.

The Fitzroy Football Club exited administration in 1998 and briefly partnered with Coburg Football Club, before merging with the Fitzroy Reds to compete in the Victorian Amateur Football Association (VAFA). It largely revived its original VFL/AFL identity, retaining its 1975–1996 jumper, club song, and home ground at Brunswick Street Oval. The aim was to not only maintain a strong Melbourne presence for Fitzroy/Brisbane Lions fans, but also the Fitzroy supporters who chose not to follow Brisbane in the AFL. This was done with the full support of the Brisbane Lions.

Between 1999 and 2009, Fitzroy and the Brisbane Lions strengthened their relationship. Since 2002, Brisbane has featured the initials BBFFC on the back of its guernseys, reflecting the club's official name. Fitzroy played the curtain-raiser at the MCG when the Brisbane Lions met Collingwood in the 2003 Heritage Round. Brisbane also now wears a version of the Fitzroy guernsey, with red instead of maroon, for most AFL matches in Victoria and other states.

Brisbane honour their connection to Fitzroy by bringing the premiership cups to Brunswick Street Oval each morning after the Grand Final. Started during the 01-03 threepeat, the tradition was maintained by the club during the 2024-2026 premiership triumphs, and family days were also held for the 2004 and 2023 loses.

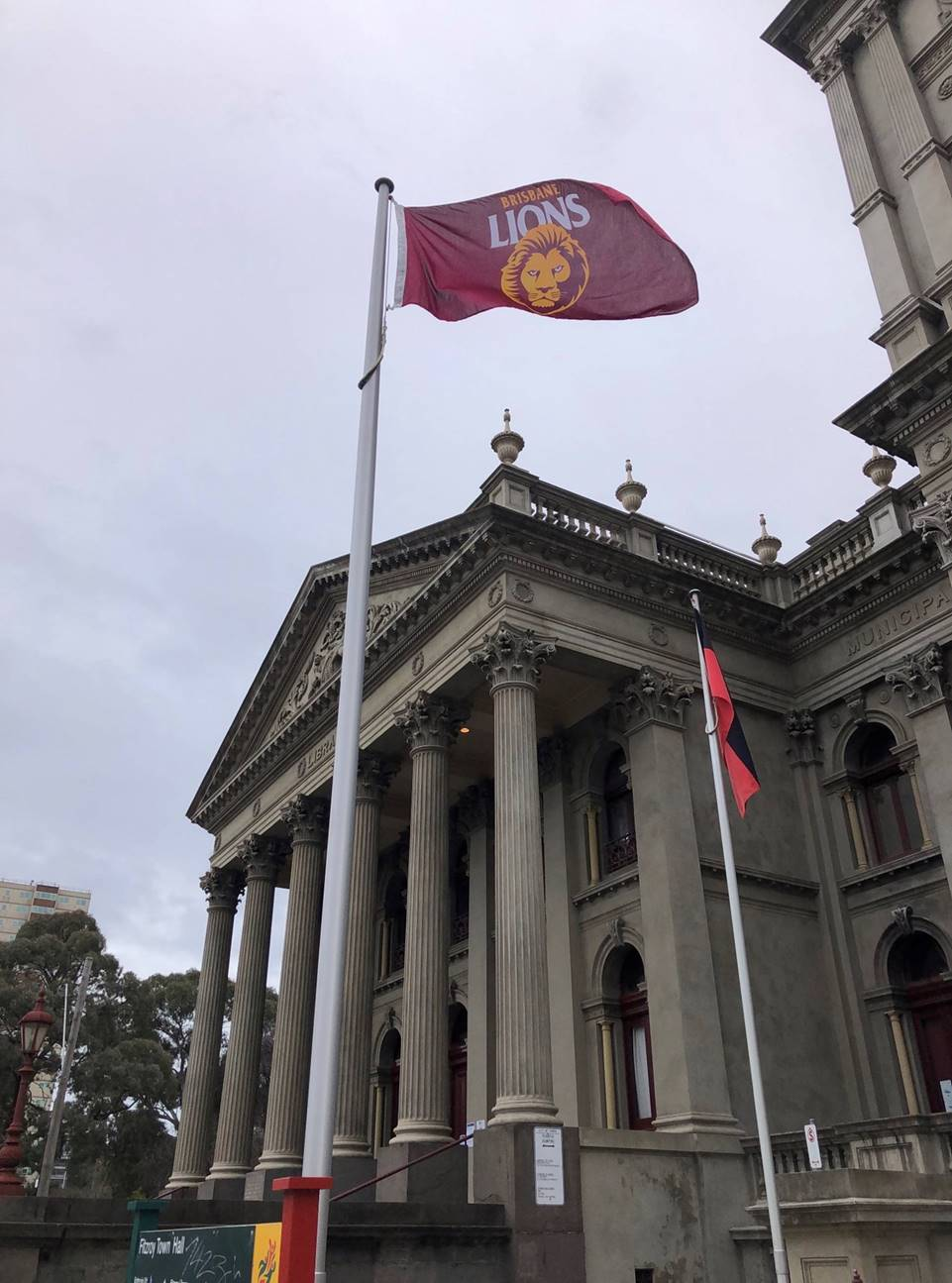
Brisbane Lions flag flying over Fitzroy Town Hall during the 2021 finals series

In 2009, relations between Brisbane and Fitzroy soured when Brisbane introduced a new logo featuring a forward-facing lion's head, replacing the traditional Fitzroy passant lion. Fitzroy claimed this breached Section 7.2(c) of the 1996 Deed of Arrangement and argued the logo change violated Brisbane's obligation to use the Fitzroy lion in perpetuity. Nicknamed "The Paddlepop Lion" after the Paddle Pop ice cream mascot, the new design was widely unpopular among fans. On 22 December 2009, Fitzroy lodged a Statement of Claim in the Supreme Court of Victoria, seeking to prevent Brisbane from using any logo other than the original Fitzroy lion. A settlement was reached on 15 July 2010: both clubs agreed the Fitzroy logo symbolically represented their 1996 merger, and Brisbane committed to using both the new and old logos side-by-side for 14 years on official stationery and publications, and for seven years on the club website.

After immense pressure from both Lions and Fitzroy fans, Brisbane returned to using the old passant lion logo on its playing guernseys from 2015 onwards, but the new lion remained as the club's official logo.

The Brisbane Lions have since renewed and maintained strong ties with the Fitzroy Football Club in the VAFA and the Fitzroy junior football club. The Brisbane Lions sponsor a male and female Fitzroy player each year, conduct coaching workshops for Fitzroy, frequently invite the Fitzroy juniors to form a guard of honour for Victorian games, and have had many Fitzroy past players and representatives as elected board members. In March 2026, The Brisbane Lions and Fitzroy announced a new multi-year sponsorship deal which entailed Brisbane signing on as a multi-year platinum sponsor to help fund Fitzroy's local football programs. This also co-incided with Brisbane unveiling a maroon, navy blue, and white Fitzroy heritage guernsey (made famous by Fitzroy and Brisbane Lions legend Kevin 'Bulldog' Murray), which is to be worn in their round 3 clash with St Kilda and round 24 clash with Collingwood. The Fitzroy club song was also played in place of the Brisbane Lions club song at the round 3 St Kilda game.

== Club identity ==
=== Emblem ===
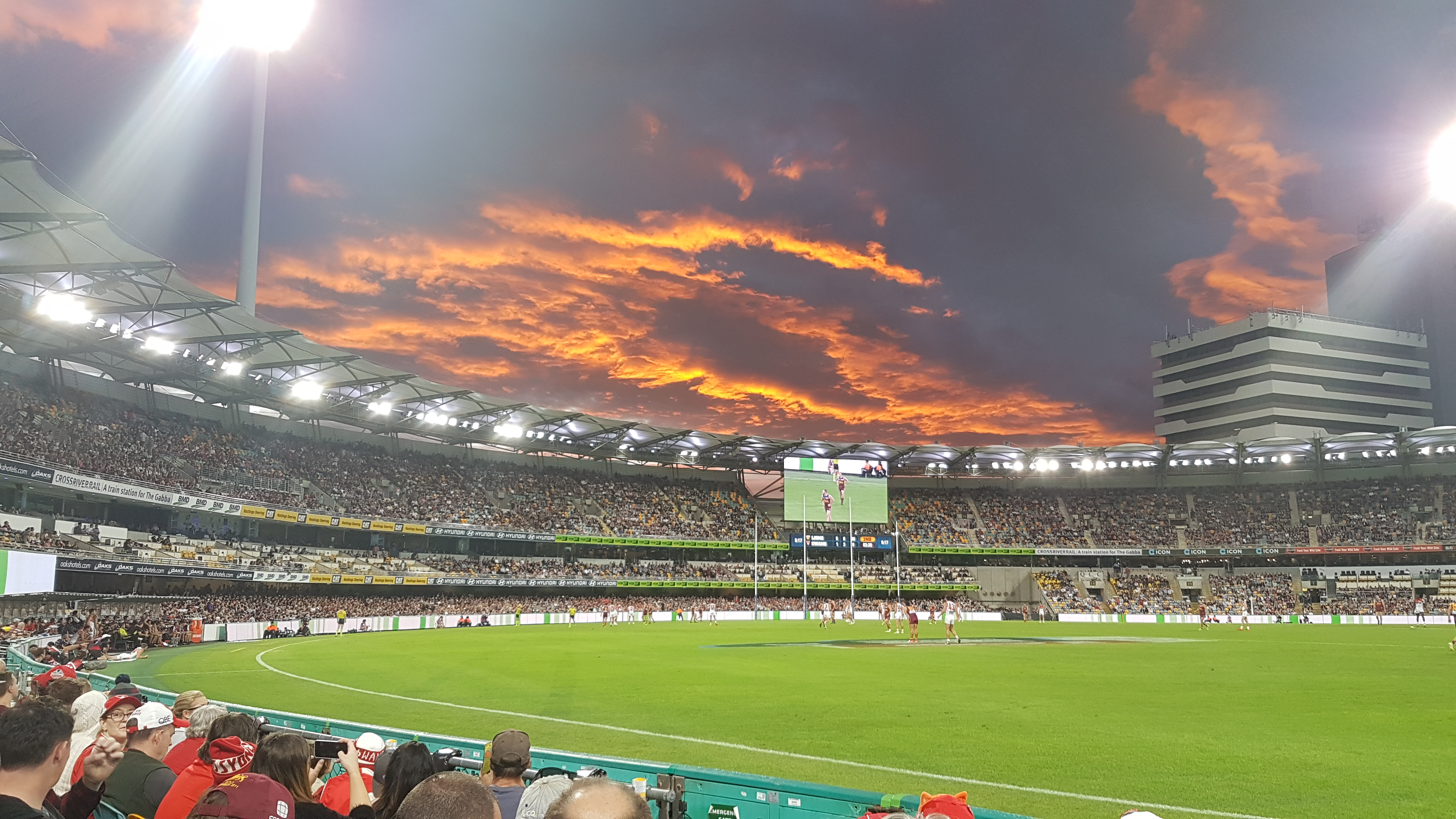
A 2019 match between Brisbane and the Sydney Swans at the Gabba, Brisbane's home ground

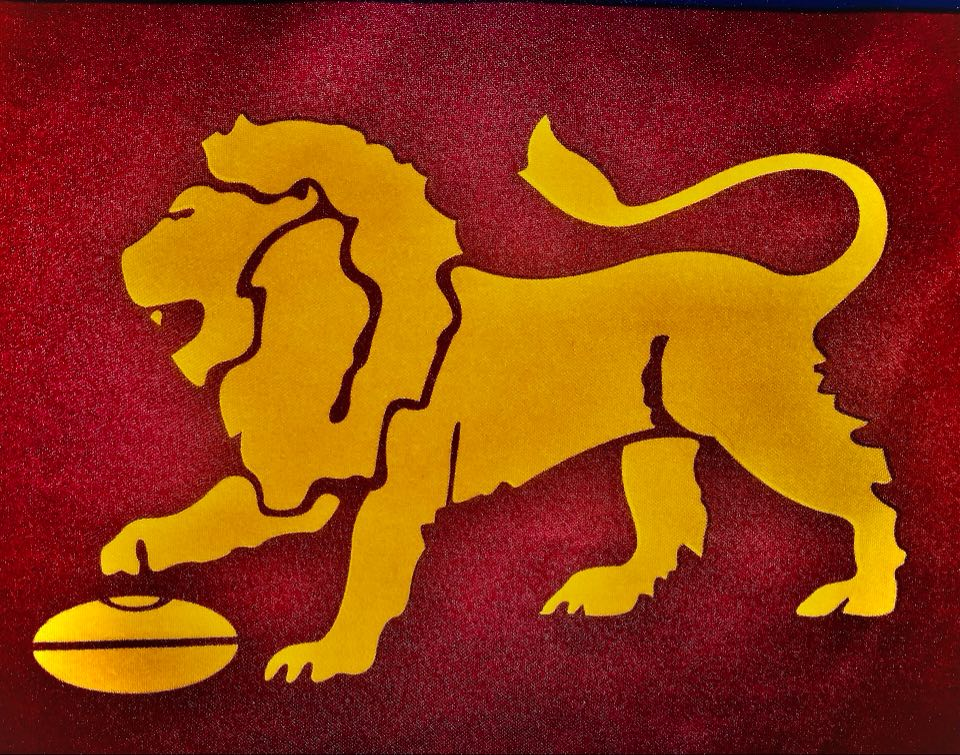
The Fitzroy passant lion became the emblem of the Brisbane Lions.

In 1997, the club unveiled its new emblem, consisting of the golden Fitzroy Lion on a badge of Maroon and Blue. The club used this emblem from 1997 until the end of 2000. In 2001, the club unveiled a new emblem in the shape of a football, emblazoned with the words "Brisbane Lions" and with the Fitzroy Lion located within the "o" of Lions, and the last of the club logos to have the AFL logo on it & this emblem was used until 2009, when the emblem was again changed, this time in favour of a forward-facing Lion head.

=== Guernseys ===
Home Guernsey (worn 1997–2009 and since 2015): Predominantly maroon guernsey with a blue yoke featuring a golden Fitzroy Lion, with a gold collar and cuffs. For shorts, maroon home shorts are worn in home games including the away match against the Swans at the SCG, while the white shorts are worn with the guernsey in the AFL Grand Final, only if the Lions were to played as the away team.

Away Guernsey (worn 2008–2009 and since 2015): Predominantly red guernsey with a blue yoke featuring a golden Fitzroy lion, with a blue collar and cuffs, and based on Fitzroy's final colours in the AFL. White away shorts are worn when this guernsey is used and played predominantly in matches except against the Suns, Giants and the Swans.

Clash Guernsey (worn since 2023): This predominantly gold guernsey features a maroon Fitzroy lion on a gold background (reminiscent of the Bears' first guernsey), with a maroon yoke and golden cuffs, only to be worn if playing against both the Suns and the Giants. The same shorts as the Away Guernsey are worn.

=== Mascot ===
The Lions' Mascot Manor representative and club mascot was Bernie "Gabba" Vegas until 2015 when Roy the Lion (named Roy after the nickname for Fitzroy fans) replaced him as mascot. In 2021 the club unveiled their Lioness mascot Aurora.

=== Songs ===
The club's team song, "The Pride of Brisbane Town", is based on the Fitzroy Football Club song written by ex-Fitzroy player Bill Stephen, and is sung to the music of "La Marseillaise", the French national anthem.

In recent seasons at the request of the playing group certain songs were chosen by the players to be played in the Gabba when they scored a goal, over time the songs such as John Denver's song Country Roads became favourites of the Lions fans who would sing the song in the event that Charlie Cameron would score a goal over time these songs became synonymous with the Lions fans in general as this was largely a first for AFL clubs.

In 2025 at the AFL Grand Final goal songs would be played at the MCG for the first time ever as both the Lions and Geelong have them although only the Lions fans sung them.

=== Home Ground ===
The Gabba has been the primary home ground of the Brisbane Lions since 1997. The Lions will permanently move their home ground and shift their home matches to Brisbane Stadium in 2033.

=== Training base ===
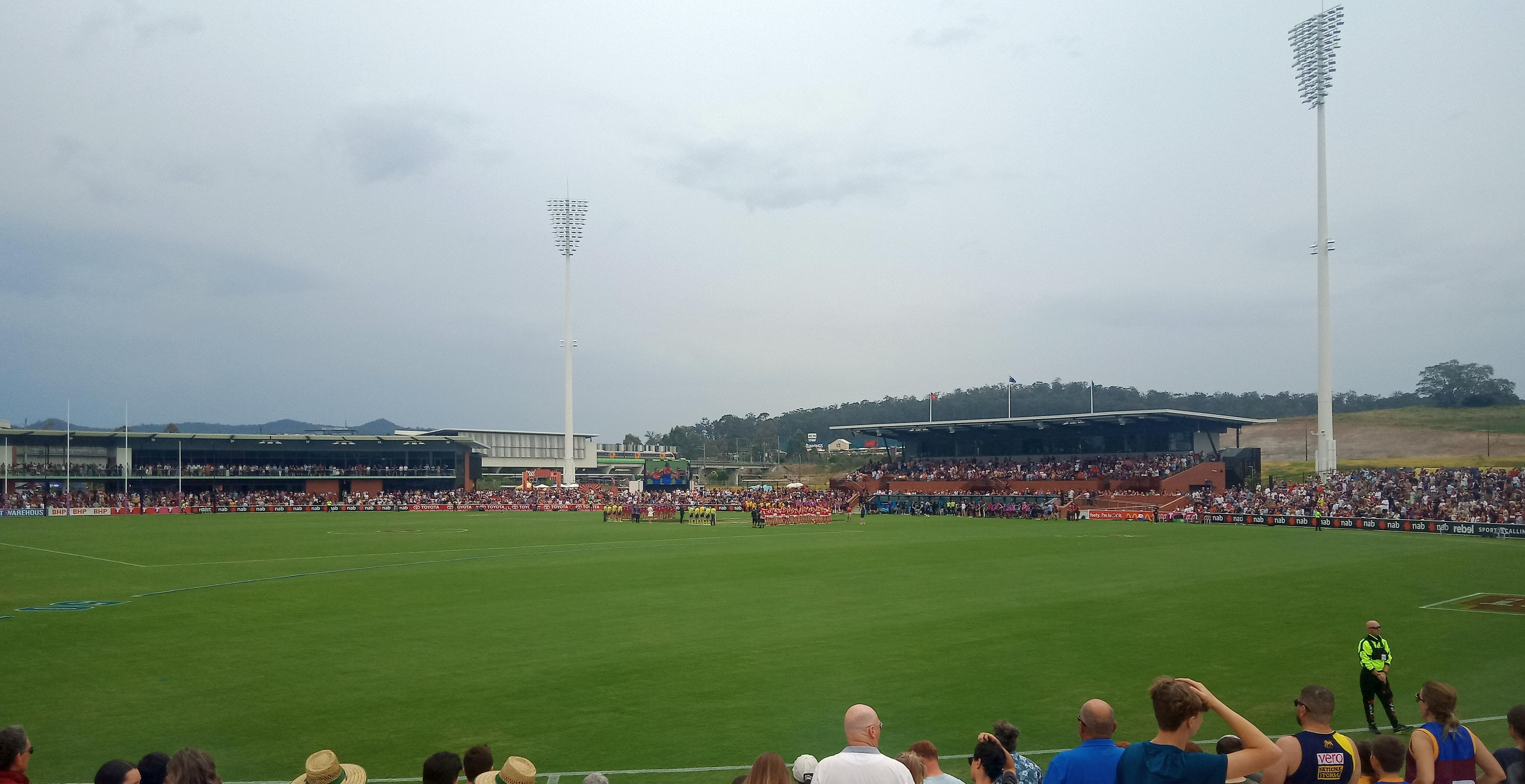
Springfield Central Stadium serves as both the training base of the Brisbane Lions and the home ground of Brisbane's AFLW team.

Between 1997 and 2022, the club trained out of the Gabba during the football season. The club's administrative and indoor training facilities were also located in the stadium. Due to the cricket season in the summer which is during the off-season for the Lions, the club was required to train at alternative locations over the years, this has included the University of Queensland campus, Leyshon Park in Yeronga, Giffin Park in Coorparoo, Moreton Bay Central Sports Complex in Burpengary, South Pine Sports Complex in Brendale and elsewhere, meaning the club lacked a dedicated and permanent home year-round. In 2020 the club announced that it would move its training and administrative facilities into Springfield Central Stadium (known for ground-sponsorship purposes as Brighton Homes Arena), an 8,000-capacity high-class facility in Ipswich that enables the club to base itself in the single location and play reserve-grade and AFLW matches at the one location. The Lions moved into the facility in October 2022.

== Rivalries ==
=== Collingwood ===
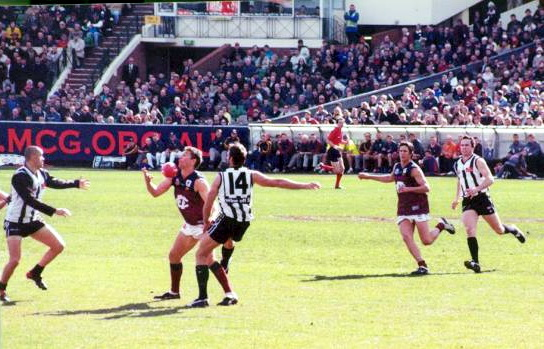
Brisbane playing against Collingwood in a 1960s Fitzroy jumper for the 2003 heritage round

Pre-1996, Fitzroy and Collingwood were fierce local rivals for over 100 years, sharing a suburban boundary down Smith Street, Melbourne, meeting in the 1903, 1905, 1917 and 1922 grand finals (with Fitzroy winning the 1905 and 1922 premierships), and both clubs topping the premiership tally in the early days of the VFL. The bad blood between The Bears and Collingwood began in 1993 after top draft pick Nathan Buckley walked out on them and went to the Magpies after playing only a single season in Brisbane. Buckley was adamant that the move was the right career direction, with the belief he had more chance of winning a premiership elsewhere. However the rivalry between the Lions and the Magpies was properly ignited in late 1999 when Collingwood played their last ever AFL game at their spiritual home ground, Victoria Park. The Lions emerged 42 point victors that day and consigned the Magpies to their second wooden spoon in their VFL/AFL history. The rivalry between the two clubs peaked in the early 2000s, as the clubs played off in two consecutive Grand Finals in 2002 and 2003, with the Lions emerging victors on both occasions. The two clubs clashed once again in the 2023 Grand Final, 20 years on from their 2003 contest, with the Magpies emerging as the victors this time. In the 2025 Preliminary Finals the Lions would eliminate Collingwood on their way to winning the 2025 AFL Premiership.

=== Gold Coast Suns ===
The Brisbane Lions have a rivalry with fellow Queensland AFL team the Gold Coast Suns. The two teams contest the QClash twice each season. The first QClash was held in 2011, with the game establishing the highest pay TV audience ever for an AFL game, with a total of 354,745 viewers watching the game.

The medal for the player adjudged best on ground is known as the Marcus Ashcroft Medal. It is named after former footballer Marcus Ashcroft, who played junior football on the Gold Coast for Southport and 318 VFL/AFL games for the Brisbane Bears/Lions between 1989 and 2003. He later joined Gold Coast's coaching staff and was the first Queenslander to play 300 VFL/AFL games. Sun Touk Miller has won the medal four times, the most by any player.

The trophy awarded to the winner of the game is currently known as the "QClash Trophy". The trophy is a "traditional style" looking silver cup with a wooden base and a plaque. The plaque's inscription reads from left to right, "Brisbane Lions AFC", "QCLASH", "Gold Coast Suns FC".

2025 marked the first time a Qclash was played during a final with the Lions eliminating the Suns 100 – 47.

=== Port Adelaide ===
The Port Adelaide Football Club entered the AFL in 1997 after Fitzroy's AFL operations were merged with Brisbane. Supporters of Fitzroy and the Brisbane Bears were aggrieved about Port's entry having taken place under these circumstances.

In their early days, the two clubs could not be separated and had multiple close encounters, with a draw in two of their first three meetings. In the early 2000s, the rivalry reached its peak as the two clubs were the most dominant of the era, consistently finishing at the top of the ladder. Between 2001 and 2004, the clubs met each other in the 2001 Ansett Australia Cup Grand Final, a 2001 qualifying final, a 2002 preliminary final and the 2004 Grand Final. Other notable encounters from this period include a round 22 match in 2002 to determine the minor premiership that year, which Port Adelaide won by a single goal, and a round 17 match in 2003 with 7 lead changes in the final quarter, which Port Adelaide won by a point.

== Honours ==
=== Club honours ===
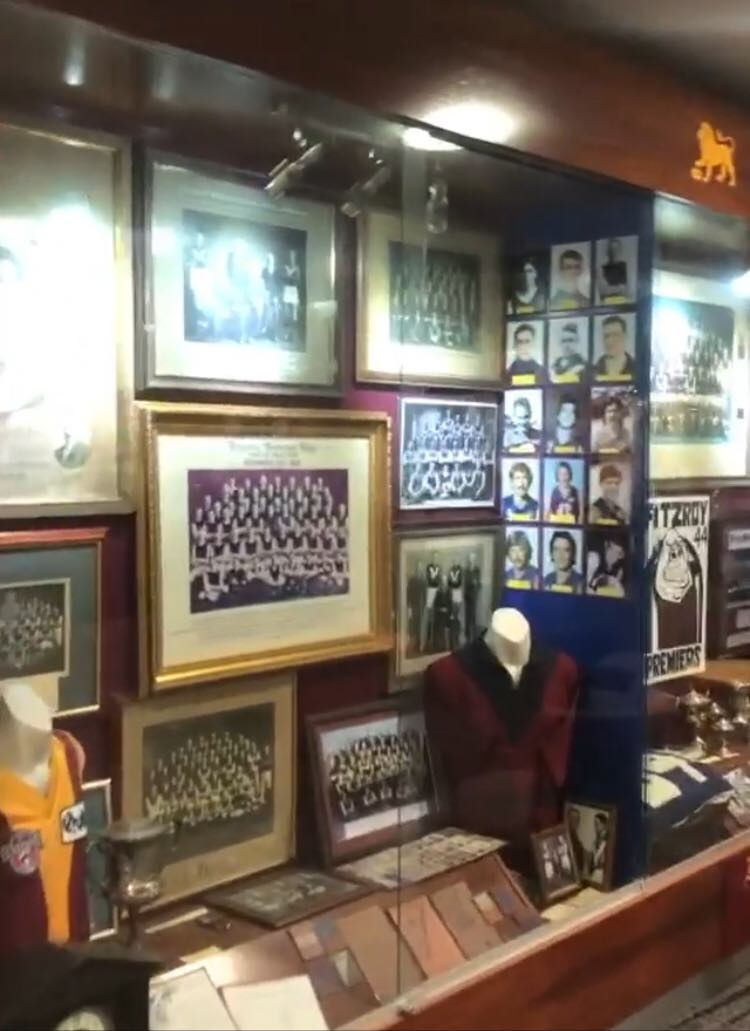
Historical Society at Docklands Stadium, Melbourne, covering the histories and records of Fitzroy, the Bears, and the Brisbane Lions.

Premierships
| Competition | Team | Wins | Seasons Won |
| Australian Football League | Men's Seniors | 6 | 2001, 2002, 2003, 2024, 2025, 2026 |
| AFL Women's | Women's Seniors | 2 | 2021, 2023 |
| Queensland Australian Football League (1998–2010) | Reserves | 1 | 2001 |
| North East Australian Football League (2011–2019) | Reserves | 4 | 2012, 2013, 2017, 2019 |
| Victorian Football League (2021–) | Reserves | 0 | Nil |
Other titles and honours
| AFL pre-season competition | Men's Seniors | 1 | 2013 |
| AFLX Tournament | Men's Seniors | 1 | 2018 |
| McClelland Trophy | Multiple (Note: Between 1951 and 1990 the McClelland Trophy was awarded to the club with the highest-aggregate points across the VFL/AFL seniors premiership, VFL/AFL reserves premiership, and VFL/AFL under 19s premiership. Between 1991 and 2022 it was awarded to the club who finished on top of the AFL premiership ladder, thereby merging it with the minor premiership. Since 2023 it has been awarded to the club with the highest aggregate-points across the AFL and AFL Women's competitions.) | 1 | 2025 |
Finishing positions
| Australian Football League | Minor premiership | 0 | Nil |
| Australian Football League | Grand Finalist | 2 | 2004, 2023 |
| Australian Football League | Wooden spoons | 2 | 1998, 2017 |
| AFL Women's | Minor premiership | 2 | 2017, 2022 (S7) |
| AFL Women's | Grand Finalist | 5 | 2017, 2018, 2022 (S7), 2024, 2025 |

=== Individual ===
==== Premiership players ====
59 players have achieved premiership success with the Brisbane Lions; of those, 39 have enjoyed multiple premierships with the Lions.

==== Team of the Decade ====
In June 2006, to recognise ten years since the creation of the Brisbane Lions, a Team of the Decade was announced.

Team of the Decade
| Backs: | Chris Johnson | Mal Michael | Darryl White |
| Half-Backs: | Marcus Ashcroft | Justin Leppitsch | Chris Scott |
| Midfielders: | Nigel Lappin | Michael Voss (c) | Brad Scott |
| Half-Forwards: | Jason Akermanis | Jonathan Brown | Craig McRae |
| Forwards: | Luke Power | Alastair Lynch | Daniel Bradshaw |
| Followers: | Clark Keating | Simon Black | Shaun Hart |
| Interchange: | Martin Pike | Tim Notting | Jamie Charman | Richard Champion |
| Coach: | Leigh Matthews |

==== Hall of Fame ====
===== Legends =====
| Name | Year inducted as inductee | Year inducted as legend | Reference | Hall of Fame profile |
|---|---|---|---|---|
| Haydn Bunton Sr. | N/A | 2012 | | Profile |
| Kevin Murray | N/A | 2012 | | Profile |
| Michael Voss | 2012 | 2014 | | Profile |
| Garry Wilson | 2012 | 2016 | | Profile |
| Simon Black | N/A | 2023 | | Profile |
| Jonathan Brown | 2019 | 2023 | | Profile |
| Robert Walls | 2019 | 2026 | | Profile |

===== Inductees =====
| Name | Year inducted | Reference | Hall of Fame profile |
|---|---|---|---|
| Marcus Ashcroft | 2012 | | Profile |
| Fred Hughson | 2012 | | Profile |
| Nigel Lappin | 2012 | | Profile |
| Justin Leppitsch | 2012 | | Profile |
| Alastair Lynch | 2012 | | Profile |
| Leigh Matthews | 2012 | | Profile |
| Jack Moriarty | 2012 | | Profile |
| John Murphy | 2012 | | Profile |
| Percy Parratt | 2012 | | Profile |
| Bernie Quinlan | 2012 | | Profile |
| Paul Roos | 2012 | | Profile |
| Allan Ruthven | 2012 | | Profile |
| Bill Stephen | 2012 | | Profile |
| Norm Brown | 2014 | | Profile |
| Shaun Hart | 2014 | | Profile |
| George Holden | 2014 | | Profile |
| Chris Johnson | 2014 | | Profile |
| Harold McLennan | 2014 | | Profile |
| Roger Merrett | 2014 | | Profile |
| Chris Scott | 2014 | | Profile |
| Bill Walker | 2014 | | Profile |
| Darryl White | 2014 | | Profile |
| Len Wigraft | 2014 | | Profile |
| Jason Akermanis | 2016 | | Profile |
| George Coates | 2016 | | Profile |
| Jimmy Freake | 2016 | | Profile |
| Norm Johnstone | 2016 | | Profile |
| Gary Pert | 2016 | | Profile |
| Luke Power | 2016 | | Profile |
| Matt Rendell | 2016 | | Profile |
| Arthur Wilson | 2016 | | Profile |
| Frank Curcio | 2019 | | Profile |
| Alan Gale | 2019 | | Profile |
| Andrew Ireland | 2019 | | Profile |
| Warwick Irwin | 2019 | | Profile |
| Richard Osborne | 2019 | | Profile |
| Daniel Bradshaw | 2023 | | Profile |
| Mick Grace | 2023 | | Profile |
| Clark Keating | 2023 | | Profile |
| Michael McLean | 2023 | | Profile |
| Craig McRae | 2023 | | Profile |
| Harvey Merrigan | 2023 | | Profile |
| Mal Michael | 2023 | | Profile |
| Martin Pike | 2023 | | Profile |
| Wilfred "Chicken" Smallhorn | 2023 | | Profile |
| Owen Abrahams | 2026 | | Profile |
| Scott Clayton | 2026 | | Profile |
| Michael Conlan | 2026 | | Profile |
| Scott McIvor | 2026 | | Profile |
| Tim Notting | 2026 | | Profile |
| Brad Scott | 2026 | | Profile |
| Len Smith | 2026 | | Profile |
| Percy Trotter | 2026 | | Profile |

== Club facts ==
=== Coaches (men's) ===
| **No.** | **Coach** | **P** | **W** | **L** | **D** | **W%** | **Years** |
| 1 | John Northey | 34 | 12 | 21 | 1 | 35.29 | 1997–1998 |
| 2 | Roger Merrett | 11 | 3 | 7 | 1 | 27.27 | 1998 |
| 3 | Leigh Matthews | 237 | 142 | 92 | 3 | 59.92 | 1999–2008 |
| 4 | John Blakey | 1 | 0 | 1 | 0 | 0.00 | 2005 |
| 5 | Michael Voss | 109 | 43 | 65 | 1 | 39.45 | 2009–2013 |
| 6 | Mark Harvey | 3 | 2 | 1 | 0 | 66.67 | 2013 |
| 7 | Justin Leppitsch | 66 | 14 | 52 | 0 | 21.21 | 2014–2016 |
| 8 | Chris Fagan | 238 | 144 | 92 | 2 | 60.92 | 2017–present |

=== Coaches (women's) ===
| No. | Coach | P | W | L | D | W% | Years |
|---|---|---|---|---|---|---|---|
| 1 | Craig Starcevich | 25 | 14 | 10 | 1 | 56.00 | 2017– |
| 2 | Daniel Merrett | 1 | 0 | 0 | 1 | 0.00 | 2020 |

=== Captains (men's) ===
| Captain | Image | Season(s) | Achievements | | | |
|---|---|---|---|---|---|---|
| Captain | Image | Season(s) | Achievements | Alastair Lynch | Colour photograph of Alastair Lynch in 2018 | 1997–2000 (co-captain) |
| Michael Voss | Colour photograph of Michael Voss in 2008 | 1997–2000 (co-captain); 2001–2006 (sole captain) | 3× AFL premiership captain: 2001, 2002, 2003; 2× All-Australian captain: 2002, 2003; 4× AFLPA best captain: 2001, 2002, 2003, 2004; Australian Football Hall of Fame | | | |
| Simon Black | Colour photograph of Simon Black in 2008 | 2007–2008 (co-captain) | | | | |
| Jonathan Brown | Colour photograph of Jonathan Brown in 2012 | 2007–2008 (co-captain); 2009–2012 (sole captain); 2013 (co-captain) | 2× AFLPA best captain: 2007, 2009; All-Australian vice-captain: 2007 | | | |
| Chris Johnson | Colour photograph of Chris Johnson | 2007 (co-captain) | | | | |
| Nigel Lappin | | 2007–2008 (co-captain) | Australian Football Hall of Fame | | | |
| Luke Power | Colour photograph of Luke Power in 2008 | 2007–2008 (co-captain) | | | | |
| Jed Adcock | Colour photograph of Jed Adcock in 2016 | 2013 (co-captain); 2014 (sole captain) | | | | |
| Tom Rockliff | Colour photograph of Tom Rockliff in 2017 | 2015–2016 | | | | |
| Dayne Beams | Colour photograph of Dayne Beams in 2017 | 2017–2018 | | | | |
| Dayne Zorko | Colour photograph of Dayne Zorko in 2017 | 2018–2022 | | | | |
| Lachie Neale | Colour photograph of Lauchie Neale in 2020 | 2023–2025 (co-captain) | 2x Ron Barassi Medalist (AFL premiership captain): 2024, 2025 | | | |
| Harris Andrews | Colour photograph of Harris Andrews in 2018 | 2023–present (co-captain) | 3x Ron Barassi Medalist (AFL premiership captain): 2024, 2025, 2026 | | | |
| Josh Dunkley | Colour photograph of Josh Dunkley in 2025 | 2026–present (co-captain) | Ron Barassi Medalist (AFL premiership captain): 2026 | | | |
| Hugh McCluggage | | 2026–present (co-captain) | Ron Barassi Medalist (AFL premiership captain): 2026 | | | |

=== Captains (women's) ===
| Captain | Image | Season(s) | Achievements | | | | |
|---|---|---|---|---|---|---|---|
| Captain | Image | Season(s) | Achievements | Emma Zielke | Colour photograph of Emma Zielke in 2017 | 2017–2018, 2020–2021 | AFLW premiership captain: 2021 |
| Leah Kaslar | Colour photograph of Leah Kaslar in 2017 | 2019 | | | | | |
| Breanna Koenen | Colour photograph of Breanna Koenen in 2023 | 2022–present | AFLW premiership captain: 2023 | | | | |

=== CEOs ===
- Andrew Ireland: 1996–2001
- Ross Oakley (interim): 2002
- Michael Bowers: 2002–2010
- Steven Wright (interim): 2010–2011
- Malcolm Holmes: 2011–2014
- Keith Samson (interim): 2014
- Greg Swann: 2014–2025
- Sam Graham: 2025–

=== Chairmen ===
- Noel Gordon: 1996–1998
- Alan Piper: 1998–2000
- Graeme Downie: 2000–2006
- Tony Kelly: 2006–2010
- Angus Johnson: 2010–2013
- Bob Sharpless: 2013–2017
- Andrew Wellington: 2017–

=== Match records (men's) ===
- Biggest winning margin: 141 points – 29.15 (189) vs. Adelaide 6.12 (48), the Gabba, 24 July 2004
- Biggest losing margin: 139 points – 7.5 (47) vs. St Kilda 28.18 (186), Docklands Stadium, 27 August 2005
- Highest score: 29.15 (189) vs. Adelaide, the Gabba, 24 July 2004
- Lowest score: 2.5 (17) vs. Richmond, Melbourne Cricket Ground, 14 April 2018
- Highest score conceded: 28.18 (186) vs. St Kilda, Docklands Stadium, 27 August 2005
- Lowest score conceded: 3.10 (28) vs. Essendon, Carrara Stadium, 31 July 2020
- Highest aggregate score: 293 points – Brisbane Lions 25.21 (171) vs. Fremantle 19.8 (122), the Gabba, 29 April 2001
- Lowest aggregate score: 76 points – Brisbane Lions 6.6 (42) vs. Collingwood 5.4 (34), the Gabba, 4 September 2020
- Most goals in a match: Jonathan Brown, ten goals vs. Carlton, the Gabba, 22 July 2007

=== Biggest home crowds ===
| Rank | Crowd | Round, Season | Result | Opponent | Brisbane Lions | Opposition | Margin | Venue | Day/Night/Twilight |
|---|---|---|---|---|---|---|---|---|---|
| 1 | 37,478 | QF2, 2019 | Loss | Richmond | 8.17 (65) | 18.4 (112) | −47 | The Gabba | Night |
| 2 | 37,224 | 15, 2005 | Win | Collingwood | 19.19 (133) | 7.13 (55) | +78 | The Gabba | Night |
| 3 | 37,032 | PF2, 2001 | Win | Richmond | 20.16 (136) | 10.8 (68) | +68 | The Gabba | Night |
| 4 | 36,803 | 4, 2003 | Win | Collingwood | 14.11 (95) | 11.15 (81) | +14 | The Gabba | Night |
| 5 | 36,780 | 2, 2010 | Win | Carlton | 16.11 (107) | 12.16 (88) | +19 | The Gabba | Night |
| 6 | 36,628 | SF2, 2025 | Win | Gold Coast | 14.16 (100) | 6.11 (47) | +53 | The Gabba | Night |
| 7 | 36,467 | 3, 2004 | Win | Collingwood | 21.11 (137) | 12.5 (77) | +60 | The Gabba | Night |
| 8 | 36,197 | 1, 2003 | Win | Essendon | 14.20 (104) | 8.13 (61) | +43 | The Gabba | Night |
| 9 | 36,149 | 10, 2001 | Win | Essendon | 15.12 (102) | 10.14 (74) | +28 | The Gabba | Night |
| 10 | 36,077 | 17, 2005 | Win | Essendon | 17.12 (114) | 14.17 (101) | +13 | The Gabba | Night |

=== AFL finishing positions (1997–present) ===
Legend: Premiers, Wooden spoon

| Finishing Position | Year (Finals in Bold) | Tally |
|---|---|---|
| **Premiers** | **2001**, **2002**, **2003**, **2024**, **2025, 2026** | 6 |
| **Runner-up** | **2004, 2023** | 2 |
| 3rd | nil | 0 |
| 4th | **1999, 2020, 2022** | 3 |
| 5th | **2000, 2019, 2021** | 3 |
| 6th | **2009** | 1 |
| 7th | nil | 0 |
| 8th | **1997** | 1 |
| 9th | nil | 0 |
| 10th | 2007, 2008 | 2 |
| 11th | 2005 | 1 |
| 12th | 2013 | 1 |
| 13th | 2006, 2010, 2012 | 3 |
| 14th | nil | 0 |
| 15th | 2011, 2014, 2018 | 3 |
| 16th | **1998** | 1 |
| 17th | 2015, 2016 | 2 |
| 18th | **2017** | 1 |

== Players ==
=== Current squad ===
Brisbane Lions · AFL personnel
| Playing list | | Inactive list | Coaching staff |
|---|---|---|---|
| 1 Kai Lohmann; 2 Sam Draper; 3 Jaspa Fletcher; 4 Oscar Allen; 5 Josh Dunkley (c); 6 Hugh McCluggage (c); 7 Jarrod Berry; 8 Will Ashcroft; 10 Levi Ashcroft; 11 Lincoln McCarthy (A); 12 Tom Doedee; 13 Logan Morris; 14 Daniel Annable; 15 Dayne Zorko; 16 Cameron Rayner; 21 Zane Zakostelsky; 22 Ty Gallop; 23 Charlie Cameron; 25 Henry Smith; 26 Conor McKenna | 27 Darcy Gardiner; 29 James Tunstill; 30 Eric Hipwood; 31 Harris Andrews (c); 32 Darcy Fort; 33 Zac Bailey; 34 Shadeau Brain; 35 Ryan Lester; 36 Reece Torrent; 37 Cody Curtin; 38 Bruce Reville; 39 Ben Murphy (B); 40 Jack Payne; 42 Tai Hayes; 43 Noah Answerth; 44 Darcy Wilmot; Kodah Edwards; Jackson Phillips; Archie Spencer; Archie Van Dyk | | Senior coach: Cameron Bruce; Assistant coach: Dale Morris (back line); Daniel Lloyd (forward line); Ben Hudson (development – ruck); Liam Jones (development); Scott Thompson (development); Legend: (c) captain; (A) Category A rookie; (B) Category B rookie; Updated: 22 November 2026; Sources: Players (rookies); coaches |

== Reserves team ==
Brisbane Lions

Names
- Former name: Suncoast Lions (2004–2011)
- Former nickname: Lion Cubs

2023 season
- Home-and-away season: 4th

Club details
- Founded: 1998 (as a reserves side)
- Competition: Victorian Football League
- Coach: Ben Hudson
- Premierships: QAFL (1): 2001; NEAFL (4): 2012; 2013; 2017; 2019
- Ground: Springfield Central Stadium

Uniforms
Home

The Brisbane reserves are the reserves team of the club, currently competing in the Victorian Football League.

=== History ===
In the inaugural year of the Brisbane Lions (1997), the club affiliated with the Queensland Australian Football League (QAFL), allowing players not selected for the AFL team to be drafted to individual clubs. Reserves players not on an AFL list cannot be called up to the AFL team, they must first be drafted into the AFL.

Between 1998 and 2010, the club's reserves team participated in the QAFL, where it was initially known as the "Lion Cubs". The club won their first reserve-grade premiership in 2001 when they defeated the Southport Sharks in the Grand Final. In 2004, they began to compete as the Suncoast Lions Football Club. The side played home matches at the Gabba (as a curtain raiser game for Brisbane Lions matches) and, formerly, at the Fishermans Road football complex on the Sunshine Coast.

In 2011, the team moved to the multi-state North East Australian Football League (NEAFL), where they won four premierships − 2012, 2013, 2017 and 2019.

Following the NEAFL disbanding after the 2019 season, the reserves side moved to the Victorian Football League (VFL), with their first season in 2021.

Since 2023, the side has played reserves matches at Springfield Central Stadium.

=== Premierships ===
| Year | Competition | Opponent | Score | Venue |
|---|---|---|---|---|
| 2001 | QAFL | Southport Sharks | **13.20 (98) – 13.8 (86)** | Giffin Park |
| 2012 | NEAFL | Queanbeyan Tigers | **22.12 (144) – 11.9 (75)** | Manuka Oval |
| 2013 | NEAFL | Sydney Swans | **12.9 (81) – 10.13 (73)** | Graham Road Oval |
| 2017 | NEAFL | Sydney Swans | **12.13 (85) – 10.22 (82)** | Sydney Cricket Ground |
| 2019 | NEAFL | Southport Sharks | **20.15 (135) – 8.11 (59)** | Fankhauser Reserve |

=== Season summaries ===
| Season | Competition | W–L–D | Ladder position | Finals result | Coach |
|---|---|---|---|---|---|
| 1998 | QAFL | Unknown | Unknown | Unknown (Note: While the finals result is unknown, it is known the team were neither premiers nor runners-up.) | Roger Merrett |
| 1999 | QAFL | Unknown | Unknown | Unknown | Unknown |
| 2000 | QAFL | Unknown | Unknown | Unknown | Unknown |
| 2001 | QAFL | Unknown | Unknown | **Premiers** | Craig Brittain |
| 2002 | QAFL | Unknown | Unknown | Unknown | Craig Brittain |
| 2003 | QAFL | Unknown | Unknown | Unknown | Craig Brittain |
| 2004 | QAFL | Unknown | Unknown | Unknown | Craig Brittain |
| 2005 | QAFL | Unknown | Unknown | Unknown | Craig Brittain |
| 2006 | QAFL | Unknown | Unknown | Unknown | John Blakey/Daryn Cresswell |
| 2007 | QAFL | Unknown | Unknown | Unknown | Craig Brittain |
| 2008 | QAFL | Unknown | Unknown | Unknown | Paul Hudson |
| 2009 | QAFL | Unknown | Unknown | Unknown | Craig Brittain |
| 2010 | QAFL | 6–12–0 | 8/10 | —N/a | Craig McRae |
| 2011 | NEAFL (Northern Conference) | 4–13–1 | 10/10 | —N/a | Nathan Clarke |
| 2012 | NEAFL (Northern Conference) | 14–4–0 | 2/10 | **Northern Conference Premiers**; **League Premiers** | Nathan Clarke |
| 2013 | NEAFL (Northern Conference) | 16–2–0 | **1/10** | **Northern Conference Premiers**; **League Premiers** | Leigh Harding |
| 2014 | NEAFL | 6–12–0 | 9/14 | —N/a | Leigh Harding |
| 2015 | NEAFL | 2–16–0 | 10/11 | —N/a | Shane Woewodin |
| 2016 | NEAFL | 3–15–0 | 10/10 | —N/a | Shane Woewodin |
| 2017 | NEAFL | 15–3–0 | 2/17 | **Premiers** | Mitch Hahn |
| 2018 | NEAFL | 10–7–1 | 5/10 | Elimination finalists | Mitch Hahn |
| 2019 | NEAFL | **18–0–0** | **1/10** | **Premiers** | Mitch Hahn |
| 2020 | Season cancelled due to COVID-19 | | | | Mitch Hahn |
| 2021 | VFL | 3–7–0 | 17/22 | —N/a | Mitch Hahn |
| 2022 | VFL | 14–4–0 | 2/21 | Preliminary finalists | Mitch Hahn |
| 2023 | VFL | 13–4–1 | 4/21 | Preliminary finalists | Ben Hudson |
| 2024 | VFL | 13–5–0 | 3/21 | Preliminary finalists | Ben Hudson |
| 2025 | VFL | 11–6–1 | 6/21 | Semi-finalists | Ben Hudson |

Statistics highlighted in bold denote the best known season for Brisbane in that category
Statistics highlighted in italic denote the worst known season for Brisbane in that category

== AFL Women's team ==
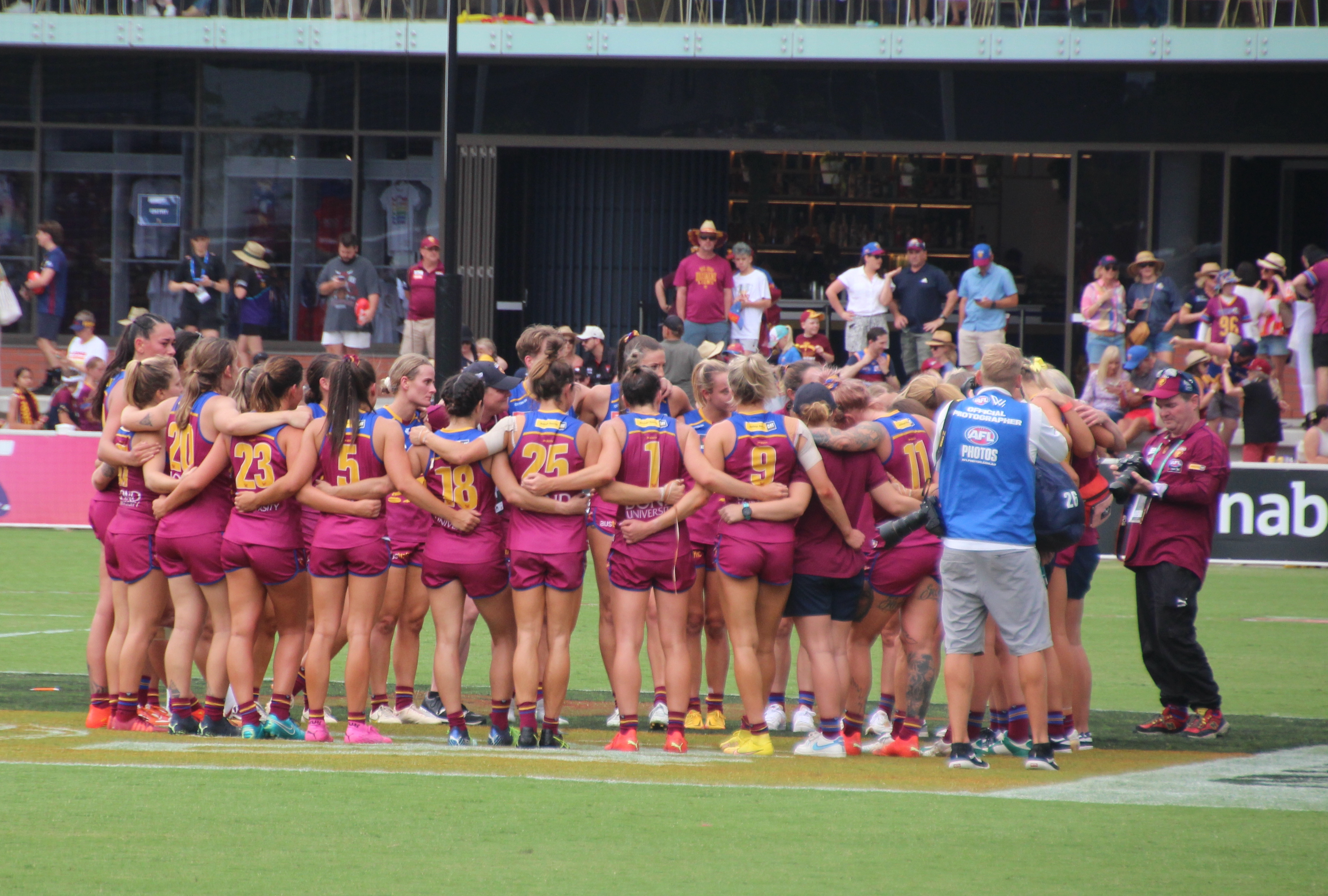
Brisbane Lions AFLW team during the 2022 season 7 Grand Final at Springfield Stadium

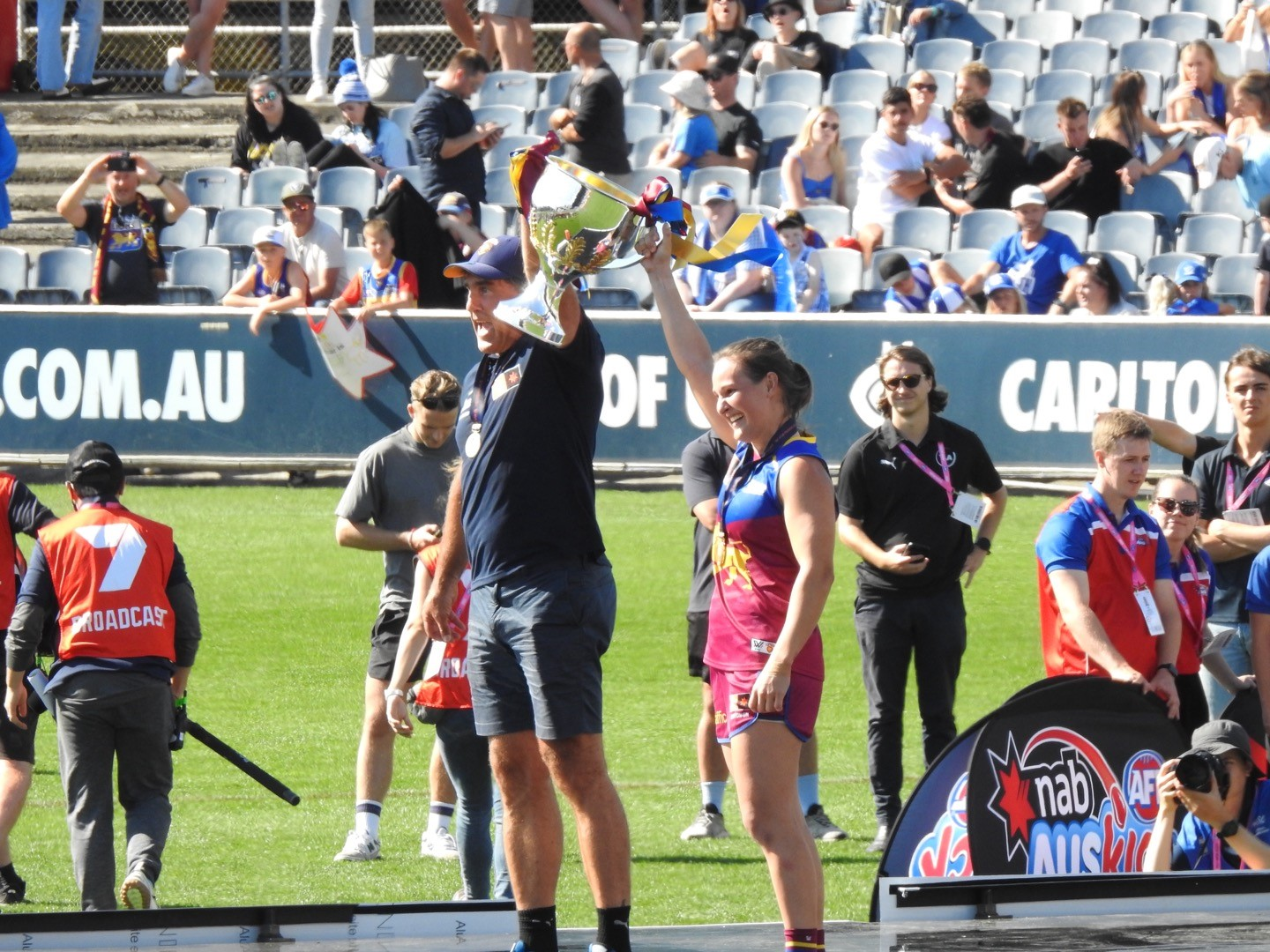
Captain Breanna Koenen and coach Craig Starcevich hold up the 2023 premiership trophy at Ikon Park.

In May 2016, the club launched a bid to enter a team in the inaugural AFL Women's season in 2017. The Brisbane Lions were granted a licence on 15 June 2016, becoming one of eight teams to compete in the league's first season. Former AFL Queensland employee Breeanna Brock was appointed to the position of Women's CEO the following day.

Tayla Harris and Sabrina Frederick-Traub were the club's first signings, unveiled along with the league's other 14 marquee players on 27 July 2016. A further 23 senior players and two rookie players were added to the club's inaugural list in the league's drafting and signing period. Emma Zielke captained the team for their inaugural season.

Former Collingwood and Brisbane Bears player and AFL Queensland coach Craig Starcevich was appointed the team's inaugural head coach in June 2016. The rest of the coaching team was announced on 8 November 2016 as David Lake as the midfield coach, Daniel Merrett as the backline coach and Brent Staker as the forward coach. Car company Hyundai, along with Epic Pharmacy, sponsored the team in 2017.

The Lions have been a successful team in the AFLW, reaching the finals in six of the first seven seasons. They narrowly lost grand finals in 2017, 2018, and 2022 (S7), and only missed out on finals in 2019. Due to a shortened 2020 season, the Lions played a Qualifying Final against Carlton before the season was prematurely ended due to COVID border restrictions. No premiership was awarded in 2020.

In 2021 the team finally broke through to win their first premiership by defeating arch-rival Adelaide in the grand final.

In 2023 the Lions took out their second premiership by defeating North Melbourne at IKON Park by 17 points. Captain Breanna Koenen was adjudged best afield for her performance in the grand final.

The team plays their home games at Springfield Central Stadium in Ipswich.

=== Current squad ===
Brisbane Lions · AFL Women's personnel
| Playing list | | Inactive list | Coaching staff |
|---|---|---|---|
| 1 Eleanor Hartill; 2 Tahlia Hickie; 3 Breanna Koenen (c); 4 Meg Lappin; 5 Jade Ellenger; 6 Lily Postlethwaite; 7 Lilly Baker; 8 Jennifer Dunne; 9 Orla O'Dwyer; 10 Nat Grider (vc); 11 Shanae Davison; 12 Sophie Conway; 13 Neasa Dooley*; 14 Dakota Davidson; 15 Lily-Rose Williamson | 16 Evie Long; 17 Belle Dawes (vc); 18 Ally Anderson; 19 Asher Fearn-Wannan; 20 Shannon Campbell; 21 Courtney Hodder; 22 Sophie Peters; 23 Rania Crozier; 24 Claudia Wright; 25 Cathy Svarc; 28 Charlotte Mullins; 29 Ruby Svarc; 30 Marlo Graham; 31 Madison Evans; 32 Keyshia Matenga | 26 Caitlin Kennedy*; 27 Olivia Lacy | Senior coach: Craig Starcevich; Assistant coaches: Paul Henriksen (assistant); Phil Lovett (assistant); Jeff White (assistant); Legend: (c) captain; (vc) vice-captain; * rookie; Updated: 22 November 2026; Sources: Players, coaches |

=== Non-playing/coaching staff ===
| Name | Position |
|---|---|
| Breeanna Brock | Chief Executive Officer |
| Zachary Zropf | Football Analyst |
| Alex Gorman | Sports Psychologist |
| Michael Swann | Wellbeing Mentor |
| Matt Green | High Performance Manager |
| Alice Walker | Head of Medical |
| Jessica Clarey | Physio |
| Abbey Le Busque | Head Trainer |
| Kieran Miles | Doctor |

=== Season summaries ===
Brisbane AFLW honour roll
| Season | Ladder | W–L–D | Finals | Coach | Captain | Best and fairest | Leading goalkicker |
|---|---|---|---|---|---|---|---|
| 2017 | 1st | 6–0–1 | Runners-up | Craig Starcevich | Emma Zielke | Emily Bates | Kate McCarthy (9) |
| 2018 | 2nd | 4–3–0 | Runners-up | Craig Starcevich | Emma Zielke | Kate Lutkins | Jess Wuetschner (13) |
| 2019 | 4th^{c}/9th^{o} (Note: In 2019 and 2020, the AFLW was split into two conferences. ^{c} denotes the statistic for Brisbane's conference, while ^{o} denotes the statistic if the conferences were combined.) | 2–5–0 | DNQ | Craig Starcevich | Leah Kaslar | Ally Anderson | Jess Wuetschner (8) |
| 2020 | 3rd^{c}/7th^{o} | 3–2–1 | Qualifying final | Craig Starcevich (Note: Daniel Merrett was coach for round 3, and Starcevich was coach for all other matches.) | Emma Zielke | Emily Bates | Jesse Wardlaw (9) |
| 2021 | 2nd | 7–2–0 | Premiers | Craig Starcevich | Emma Zielke | Ally Anderson | Dakota Davidson (16) |
| 2022 (S6) | 3rd | 8–2–0 | Preliminary final | Craig Starcevich | Breanna Koenen | Emily Bates | Greta Bodey (13) |
| 2022 (S7) | 1st | 9–1–0 | Runners-up | Craig Starcevich | Breanna Koenen | Emily Bates | Jesse Wardlaw (22) |
| 2023 | 4th | 7–3–0 | Premiers | Craig Starcevich | Breanna Koenen | Ally Anderson | Dakota Davidson (23) |
| 2024 | 3rd | 9–2–0 | Runners-up | Craig Starcevich | Breanna Koenen | Ally Anderson | Taylor Smith (22) |
| 2025 | 3rd | 9–3–0 | Runners-up | Craig Starcevich | Breanna Koenen | Belle Dawes | Taylor Smith (18) |

== Brisbane Lions Academy ==
The Brisbane Lions Academy consists of the club's junior development signings. It was formed in 2010 as one of four Northern AFL Academies including the Gold Coast Suns Academy, Sydney Swans Academy and GWS Giants Academy.

28 staff (including 3 full time) manage 220 selected underage players from age 12 up.

The men's and women's U16 and U18 teams have contested Division 2 of the men's and women's underage championships since 2017. The Under 16 women's was crowned inaugural champions in 2023.

The Lions Academy also joined the Talent League in 2019.

=== Notable members ===
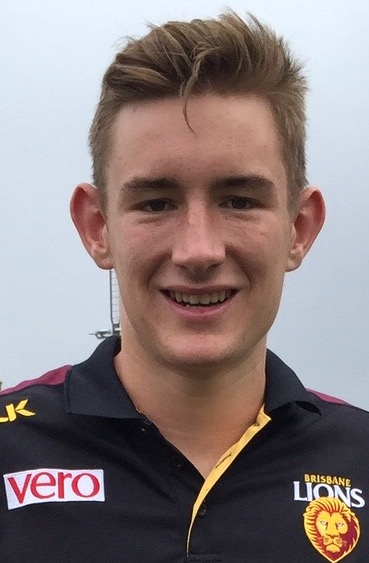
Local Brisbane product and Lions captain Harris Andrews was recruited via the club's Academy as a 17 year old.

Past academy members include Brisbane AFL players Charlie Cameron, Harris Andrews, Eric Hipwood, Keidean Coleman, Jack Payne, Jaspa Fletcher, Ty Gallop and Matthew Hammelmann. It also includes players who found success with other clubs: Aliir Aliir, Mabior Chol, Noah Cumberland, Wylie Buzza, Samson Ryan, Ben Keays and, Corey Wagner. Academy members who went on to excel in other sports include Kalyn Ponga and Corey Horsburgh. Leigh Ryswyk, who played for Suncoast Lions in 2005, became notable in January 2026 when he became the first AFL player to come out as gay.

Notable female academy players include Brisbane Lions senior AFLW players Mikayla Pauga, Sophie Conway, Belle Dawes, Gabby Collingwood, Nat Grider, Tahlia Hickie, Jade Ellenger, Lily Postlethwaite, Luka Yoshida-Martin and Charlotte Mullins. Players who went on to other clubs include: Jesse Wardlaw, Zimmorlei Farquharson and Jacqui Yorston.

== Activism ==
=== Same Sex Marriage ===
During the Australian Marriage Law Postal Survey, The Brisbane Lions supported the Yes vote.

=== Voice to Parliament ===
The Brisbane Lions were a supporter of the Voice to Parliament.

== See also ==
- Brisbane Lions players
- Merrett–Murray Medal
- Australian rules football in Queensland
- Sport in Queensland
