= Ben Hudson =

Australian rules footballer

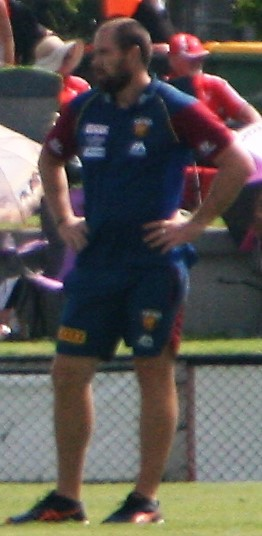
- Hudson before a game in March 2018

Personal information
- Full name: Benjamin Hudson
- Born: 24 February 1979 (age 47); Fitzroy, Melbourne
- Original team: Werribee (VFL)
- Draft: No. 58, 2003 National Draft, Adelaide
- Height: 199 cm (6 ft 6 in)
- Weight: 108 kg (238 lb)
- Position: Ruckman

Club information
- Current club: Brisbane Lions (ruck and midfield coach)

Playing career
Years	Club	Games (Goals)
2004–2007	Adelaide	55 (6)
2008–2011	Western Bulldogs	88 (9)
2012	Brisbane Lions	18 (3)
2013–2014	Collingwood	7 (1)
Total		168 (19)

Ben Hudson (born 24 February 1979) is a former professional Australian rules footballer who played for the Adelaide Football Club, Western Bulldogs, Brisbane Lions and Collingwood Football Club in the Australian Football League (AFL). He has served as the defensive skills, ruck and forwards coach at the Brisbane Lions since September 2014. He was also the ruck coach for Collingwood after being selected as a mature age rookie player in the 2012 rookie draft.

== Early life ==
Hudson was born in Victoria, but moved to Queensland at 8 years old where he grew up in Palm Beach, a suburb of the Gold Coast. He first played junior football for Palm Beach Currumbin before focusing on basketball while he attended Somerset College on the Gold Coast throughout his teenage years.

Hudson played basketball until 2000, when he began driving to Brisbane to study physiotherapy at the University of Queensland, living at Union College, where he played for the University of Queensland Australian Football Club at 21 years of age as a ruckman. His coach later recommended that he play for Mount Gravatt Football Club where he played under coach Danny Craven.

At Mount Gravatt, he won a best and fairest in 2001, before taking part in the club's 2002 premiership side. That year he represented Queensland against Western Australia.

He later returned to Victoria, where he tried out with the Werribee Football Club, where at the relatively late age of 24, Adelaide Football Club talent scouts recognised his skills and lured him to the AFL at pick number 58 in the 2003 AFL draft.

== AFL career ==
=== Adelaide ===
As a mobile ruckman, Hudson enjoyed a successful debut before seriously injuring the anterior cruciate ligament in his right knee during a fall on the eve of the 2005 finals series. He required a full knee reconstruction, which resulted in the return of veteran ruckman Matthew Clarke back from the brink of retirement.

Hudson recovered well from the injury to play in the SANFL late in 2006. He returned to the Crows in 2007 and performed well throughout the year, playing 22 games, garnering 366 hit-outs and finishing second overall in the AFL for hardball gets.

During the year, he was suspended for one week by the club for breaking the team curfew. He was also allegedly upset by criticism from Adelaide coach Neil Craig.

On 19 September 2007, Hudson asked to be traded to the Western Bulldogs, after contract negotiations with Adelaide broke down.

=== Western Bulldogs ===
Hudson officially joined the Western Bulldogs on a three-year contract on 12 October 2007, after the Adelaide Football Club's hand was forced into a trade. Hudson has fitted in well at his new club and his superb performance against ladder leaders Hawthorn led coach Alastair Clarkson to name him the trade of the year.

Hudson was elected into the Western Bulldogs Leadership Group by the players for the 2009 season, joining Captain Brad Johnson, Daniel Giansiracusa, Robert Murphy, Daniel Cross, Matthew Boyd, Dale Morris and Shaun Higgins.

In the Round 11 match against St. Kilda, Hudson was charged with a Level Two striking offence against Leigh Montagna during the second quarter, because the action was considered to be of intentional conduct (three points), low impact (one point) and body contact (one point). A Level Two offence draws 125 demerit points and a one-match sanction. However, because Hudson had no existing good or bad record, an early plea could reduce the penalty by 25 percent to a reprimand and 93.75 points towards his future record, which he accepted.

=== Brisbane Lions ===
On 24 August 2011, Hudson announced that he was to retire from football at the end of the season and move to Queensland, however an offer from the Brisbane Lions talked him out of retirement, and the Bulldogs traded him to the Lions for Pick #70 in the 2011 AFL draft. On 27 October 2012, he again announced his retirement after playing seven games for the Lions in 2012.

=== Collingwood ===
Hudson announced his intentions to again come out of retirement and started training with Collingwood on 27 November in hopes of them drafting him as a mature aged rookie. On 11 December, Collingwood drafted him in the 2013 Rookie Draft. Hudson played his first game for Collingwood on 14 April, against Hawthorn. Collingwood also used Hudson as the club's ruck coach during his two years. In 2014, Hudson retired from playing football.

=== Return to Brisbane Lions ===
After retiring from playing football and following his work as a ruck coach with Collingwood, Hudson returned to Brisbane Lions when he was announced forward, defensive skills and ruck coach for 2015 on 18 September 2014. He has maintained this coaching role in 2016.
