= 1997 Brisbane Lions season =

Brisbane Lions
1997 season
- Coach: John Northey
- Captains: Alastair Lynch; Michael Voss
- Home ground: The Gabba (Capacity: 42,000)
- AFL season: 8th
- Best and fairest: Matthew Clarke
- Leading goalkicker: Justin Leppitsch (50 goals)
- Highest home attendance: 21,348 vs. Adelaide (18 July 1997)
- Lowest home attendance: 17,123 vs. St Kilda (6 April 1997)
- Average home attendance: 19,550
- Club membership: 16,769

The Brisbane Lions' 1997 season was its first season in the Australian Football League (AFL) after its merger.

== Draft picks ==
Round	Pick	Player	Recruited from
1	3	Rory Hilton	Murray Bushrangers
2	26	Tim Notting	North Ballarat Rebels

== Players ==
Brisbane Lions 1997 squad
Senior list		Coaching staff
1 Richard Champion; 2 Chris Johnson; 3 Michael Voss (c); 4 Craig McRae; 5 Nathan Chapman; 6 Adrian Fletcher; 7 Scott McIvor; 8 Andrew Gowers; 9 Brad Boyd; 10 Marcus Ashcroft; 11 Alastair Lynch (c); 12 Jason Akermanis; 13 Brett Voss; 14 Danny Dickfos; 15 Steven Lawrence; 16 Matthew Clarke; 18 Craig Lambert; 19 Michael McLean; 20 Jarrod Molloy; 21 Brent Green; 22 Chris Scott	23 Justin Leppitsch; 25 Andrew Bews; 26 John Barker; 27 Clark Keating; 28 Ben Robbins; 32 Shaun Hart; 33 Darryl White; 34 Scott Bamford; 35 Nick Trask; 36 Daniel Bradshaw; 37 Nick Carter; 38 Dion Scott; 40 Shane Clayton; 41 Matthew Kennedy; 42 Tristan Lynch; 44 Nigel Lappin	Head coach: John Northey; Legend: (c) Captain(s); (vc) Vice-captain(s)

== Season summary ==
=== Premiership Season ===
==== Home and away season ====
Rd	Date and local time	Opponent	Scores		Venue	Attendance
Rd	Date and local time	Opponent	Brisbane	Opponent	Venue	Attendance
1	30 March (1:40 pm)	Adelaide	96	132	Football Park (A)	36,602
2	6 April (2:45 pm)	St Kilda	154	57	The Gabba (H)	17,123
3	13 April (2:10 pm)	Hawthorn	75	87	Waverley Park (A)	27,947
4	20 April (2:45 pm)	North Melbourne	109	83	The Gabba (H)	18,575
5	27 April (2:10 pm)	Port Adelaide	71	73	Football Park (A)	31,757
6	3 May (2:10 pm)	Essendon	71	102	Melbourne Cricket Ground (A)	37,642
7	11 May (2:45 pm)	West Coast	60	139	The Gabba (H)	17,524
8	18 May (2:10 pm)	Fremantle	93	98	Subiaco Oval (A)	14,721
9	25 May (2:45 pm)	Geelong	126	98	The Gabba (H)	19,828
10	1 June (2:10 pm)	Sydney	92	89	The Gabba (H)	20,403
11	9 June (2:10 pm)	Carlton	63	84	Princes Park (A)	27,904
12	15 June (2:10 pm)	Melbourne	135	50	Melbourne Cricket Ground (A)	13,392
13	28 June (7:40 pm)	Collingwood	88	73	The Gabba (H)	19,560
14	6 July (2:10 pm)	Richmond	68	50	The Gabba (H)	19,155
15	12 July (2:10 pm)	Western Bulldogs	137	73	Princes Park (A)	16,430
16	18 July (7:40 pm)	Adelaide	118	87	The Gabba (H)	21,348
17	27 July (2:10 pm)	St Kilda	44	92	Waverley Park (A)	34,859
18	2 August (7:40 pm)	Hawthorn	141	71	The Gabba (H)	19,635
19	8 August (7:40 pm)	North Melbourne	59	116	Melbourne Cricket Ground (A)	27,021
20	16 August (7:40 pm)	Port Adelaide	93	93	The Gabba (H)	20,835
21	23 August (7:40 pm)	Essendon	102	106	The Gabba (H)	21,065
22	29 August (6:40 pm)	West Coast	81	120	WACA (A)	29,402

==== Finals series ====
Rd	Date and local time	Opponent	Scores		Venue	Attendance
Rd	Date and local time	Opponent	Brisbane	Opponent	Venue	Attendance
Second qualifying final	7 September (2:30 pm)	St Kilda	89	135	Waverley Park	50,035

== Ladder ==
(P)	Premiers
	Qualified for finals

#	Team	P	W	L	D	PF	PA	%	Pts
1	St Kilda	22	15	7	0	2294	1918	119.6	60
2	Geelong	22	15	7	0	2111	1791	117.9	60
3	Western Bulldogs	22	14	8	0	2100	2062	101.8	56
4	Adelaide (P)	22	13	9	0	2151	1769	121.6	52
5	West Coast	22	13	9	0	1969	1770	111.2	52
6	Sydney	22	12	10	0	2093	1801	116.2	48
7	North Melbourne	22	12	10	0	2051	1835	111.8	48
8	Brisbane Lions	22	10	11	1	2076	1973	105.2	42
9	Port Adelaide	22	10	11	1	1852	2017	91.8	42
10	Collingwood	22	10	12	0	2138	1919	111.4	40
11	Carlton	22	10	12	0	1978	2045	96.7	40
12	Fremantle	22	10	12	0	1748	1902	91.9	40
13	Richmond	22	10	12	0	1883	2253	83.6	40
14	Essendon	22	9	13	0	2004	2170	92.4	36
15	Hawthorn	22	8	14	0	1873	2144	87.4	32
16	Melbourne	22	4	18	0	1477	2429	60.8	16

Rules for classification: 1. premiership points; 2. percentage; 3. points for
Average score: 90.3
Source: AFL Tables
