= Vero Insurance =

Australian insurance company

- Industry: General insurance
- Founded: 2003; 23 years ago
- Headquarters: Sydney, Australia
- Area served: Australia and New Zealand
- Key people: Anthony Day (CEO); Andrew Mair; Darren O'Connell; Matt Pearson (Executive General Managers)
- Parent: Suncorp Group
- Website: www.vero.com.au

Vero Insurance is an Australian insurance company. Founded in 2003, it is one of the largest insurance companies in Australia.

== History ==
In 1833, Alliance Insurance, a UK-based company, established an office in Australia, and wrote one of Australia's first life insurance policies. In 1848, Royal Insurance opened an office in Adelaide. In 1849, it opened one in Sydney, and in 1850, Melbourne. In 1865, the Sun Insurance Office began functioning as an agency for the first time. Also in 1865, London Insurance began functioning simultaneously in the cities of Sydney, Melbourne, Adelaide, Hobart and Launceston.

In 1959, Alliance Insurance and Sun Insurance merged to form Sun Alliance. In 1961, Royal Insurance acquired the London & Lancashire and Derwent & Tamar group. Derwent & Tamar was Australia's first insurance company.

In 1965, Sun Alliance merged with London Insurance, and changed its name slightly to SunAlliance.

In 1985, SunAlliance acquired the Phoenix group of Century, Prudential and Cornhill. In 1986, Australian Alliance Insurance was established as a separate company to SunAlliance, to cater to the needs of the elderly. It did this through its brand, Australian Pensioners Insurance Agency. In 1992, Royal Insurance and SunAlliance merged to become Royal & SunAlliance. In 1994. SunAlliance purchased New Zealand's general insurance group Royal Insurance.

In 2003, Royal & SunAlliance announced a change in organisational structure in Australia and New Zealand and changed its name to Promina. The name of the general insurance company was changed to Vero Insurance. In 2007, Promina and Suncorp merged. In 2012, Vero Insurance became the co-major sponsor, with National Storage, for the Brisbane Lions, from the 2013 season onwards. Its sponsorship of the Lions ended at the conclusion of the 2018 season.

== Notable claims ==
Vero made what it considered a "historic" claim on the New Zealand 2011 earthquakes in December 2014. It made the biggest claim for the 2011 earthquakes, with $550 million.

== Attempted creation of controversy ==
In May 2014, Vero refused to pay Alex Fraser (an 87-year-old pensioner) the $2,900 cost of a cruise he had cancelled when his sister, Jean Docherty, became ill. She died three days later. He had paid $200 on his insurance policy to cover in case a relative became sick or died but a clause in the policy defined a 'relative' as an immediate family member under the age of 75. His sister was 81 at the time.
