= National Storage =

Australian self storage company

- Company type: Public
- Traded as: ASX: NSR
- Industry: Self storage
- Predecessors: Merger of: Stowaway Self Storage; National Mini Storage; Premier Self Storage
- Founded: December 2000; 25 years ago
- Headquarters: Brisbane, Australia
- Area served: Australia and New Zealand
- Key people: Andrew Catsoulis (Managing Director)
- Website: nationalstorage.com.au

National Storage is one of the leading self-storage providers in Australia and New Zealand, providing residential and commercial storage to customers at 200+ centres. In December 2013, National Storage listed on the Australian Securities Exchange (ASX) forming National Storage REIT (NSR), the first publicly listed independent, internally managed and fully integrated owner and operator of self-storage centres in Australia.

National Storage offers self-storage, business storage, climate controlled wine storage, vehicle storage, vehicle and trailer hire, packaging, insurance, logistics and other value-add services.

They are currently one of the premier sponsors of the Brisbane Broncos, and gold sponsors of Richmond Football Club, amongst other partnerships. From 2013 to 2015, they were a major sponsors of the Brisbane Lions in the Australian Football League.

National Storage REIT Head Office is in Brisbane, Australia.

== History ==
National Storage was founded in December 2000, in a merger between Stowaway Self Storage, National Mini Storage and Premier Self Storage.
