= 2024 AFL Women's Grand Final =

2024 Australian football match

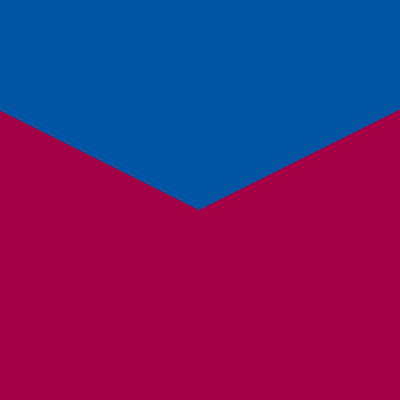
North Melbourne	Brisbane
6.3 (39)	1.3 (9)
	1	2	3	4
NM	3.0 (18)	4.1 (25)	4.1 (25)	6.3 (39)
BL	1.1 (7)	1.2 (8)	1.3 (9)	1.3 (9)
- Date: 30 November 2024
- Stadium: Ikon Park
- Attendance: 12,122
- Umpires: Matt Adams, Gabby Simmonds, Sam Whetton

Ceremonies
- Pre-match entertainment: Lime Cordiale
- National anthem: Bobby Fox

Broadcast in Australia
- Network: Seven Network, Fox Footy
- Commentators: Jason Bennett, Jo Wotton, Abbey Holmes, Kate McCarthy, Erin Phillips, Nat Edwards

The 2024 AFL Women's Grand Final was an Australian rules football match which was held on 30 November at Ikon Park to determine the premiers of the ninth season of the AFL Women's (AFLW) competition. The match was between North Melbourne and Brisbane, and was the second consecutive grand final to feature the matchup. North Melbourne beat the Lions by 30 points. This was the club's first premiership in the AFLW and the first premiership of an expansion club.

== Entertainment ==
Pop rock band Lime Cordiale provided a 15-minute set for the Telstra Pre-Game Entertainment, while actor, dancer and singer Bobby Fox sang the Australian national anthem.

Lime Cordiale's setlist included "Pedestal", "Temper Temper", "Robbery" and "Inappropriate Behaviour". The performance received mixed reviews from fans and viewers.

Scheduled on-field events
Time	Event
7:03 pm	Lime Cordiale performs for the Telstra Pre-Game Entertainment
7:24 pm	Teams enter the ground
7:37 pm	Welcome to Country—Wurundjeri Elder Uncle Colin Hunter Jr.
7:39 pm	Delivery of the premiership cup by Cup Ambassador, Erin Phillips
7:40 pm	A moment of silence in memoriam of Bianca Jones and Holly Bowles, victims of the Laos methanol poisoning incident
7:41 pm	The Australian National Anthem performed by Bobby Fox
7:45 pm	Game starts
Post game	Post game presentation

All times are in Australian Eastern Daylight Time (GMT +11)

== Teams ==
Both sides announced unchanged teams from their preliminary finals.

North Melbourne
B:	17 Sarah Wright	20 Jasmine Ferguson	
HB:	2 Libby Birch	9 Emma Kearney (c)	12 Nicole Bresnehan
C:	8 Taylah Gatt	25 Jasmine Garner	15 Amy Smith
HF:	13 Vikki Wall	3 Bella Eddey	6 Alice O'Loughlin
F:	16 Tahlia Randall	33 Kate Shierlaw	
Foll:	26 Kim Rennie	7 Ash Riddell	23 Mia King
Int:	14 Erika O'Shea	19 Ruby Tripodi	5 Tess Craven
Int:	60 Emma King	35 Jenna Bruton	
Coach:	Darren Crocker		
Emg:	11 Eliza Shannon	28 Niamh Martin	24 Lulu Pullar

Brisbane
B:	8 Jennifer Dunne	20 Shannon Campbell	
HB:	10 Nat Grider	3 Breanna Koenen (c)	5 Jade Ellenger
C:	9 Orla O'Dwyer	18 Ally Anderson	12 Sophie Conway
HF:	28 Charlotte Mullins	21 Courtney Hodder	6 Lily Postlethwaite
F:	31 Taylor Smith	14 Dakota Davidson	
Foll:	2 Tahlia Hickie	17 Belle Dawes	25 Cathy Svarc
Int:	15 Poppy Boltz	1 Eleanor Hartill	29 Ruby Svarc
Int:	16 Evie Long	7 Ellie Hampson	
Coach:	Craig Starcevich		
Emg:	11 Shanae Davison	4 Dee Heslop	13 Kate Lutkins

=== Umpires ===
2024 AFL Women's Grand Final umpires
Position	Umpires	Emergency
Field umpires	Matt Adams, Gabby Simmonds, Sam Whetton	Jordyn Pearson
Boundary umpires	Kaitlin Barr, Ben Duce, Scott Hansford, Zachary Mousaco	Harrison Bell
Goal umpires	Georgia Henderson, John Varker	Matthew Edwards

== Scoreboard ==
Grand Final
Saturday, 30 November (7:45 pm)	North Melbourne	def.	Brisbane	Ikon Park (crowd: 12,122)	afl.com.au report
3.0 (18); 4.1 (25); 4.1 (25); 6.3 (39)	Q1; Q2; Q3; Final	1.1 (7); 1.2 (8); 1.3 (9); 1.3 (9)	Umpires: Adams, Simmonds, Whetton; Best on ground: Jasmine Garner (North Melbourne); Television broadcast: Seven Network, Fox Footy; National anthem: Bobby Fox
O'Loughlin 3, Wall 2, Craven	Goals	Hampson
Garner, Riddell, Kearney, Craven, Wright	Best	Dawes, Anderson, O'Dwyer, Dunne
Nil	Injuries	Hickie (elbow), Ellenger (ankle)
Nil	Reports	Nil

== Match summary ==
The first goal of the game was scored by North Melbourne's Tess Craven, who somehow found herself in space in front of goal to take an uncontested mark from a hurried kick from Jasmine Garner. Although the Brisbane Lions mounted a series of strong attacks, North Melbourne made more of its opportunities, and led the uncontested possession count by 29–8. A second goal was scored by North's Alice O'Loughlin from the top of the goal square after receiving a handball from Tahlia Randall. Soon after, O'Loughlin scored again after laying a tackle on Brisbane defender Poppy Boltz. In the dying minutes of the quarter, North ruck Emma King laid a late high tackle on Brisbane's Bre Koenen, resulting in Ellie Hampson being awarded a down-field free kick. A thumping and accurate one followed, and Brisbane had scored its first goal. North Melbourne took an eleven-point lead into quarter time.

North dominated the second term, but Brisbane's Jennifer Dunne, Shannon Campbell and Bre Koenen were staunch in defence and conceded only added one goal. North Melbourne's Vikki Wall marked 20 metres out and directly in front of goal. She was the only North Melbourne player without a touch in the first quarter, whereas eight Brisbane Lions players had not touched the football. At the other end of the ground, North's back line was impressively disciplined, with Sarah Wright, Emma Kearney and Libby Birch maintaining their formation under pressure and dealing with Brisbane's forays forward. The Lions had one decent shot at goal, but Orla O'Dwyer missed. O'Dwyer and teammate Ally Anderson led the disposal count, but forward Dakota Davidson had still not had a touch.

Brisbane ruck Tahlia Hickie injured her elbow in the opening minutes of the third quarter, but later returned to the game after treatment. Brisbane's Jade Ellenger injured her ankle later in the quarter, and did not return. North Melbourne skipper Emma Kearney had only returned from a hamstring injury the week before, and had not racked up much time on ground in that preliminary final match, but there was no sign of it, and her 19th disposal sent the ball to O'Loughlin, who once again marked inside 50, but failed to score. Her strongest competition for best on ground came from teammate Jasmine Garner. Garner was loosely tagged by Ellenger in the first half, but Bre Koenen was moved on to her in the second, as was the case in the previous year's grand final. Brisbane actually won the quarter, but only by a solitary rushed behind.

In the final quarter, Wall kicked a second goal from 35 metres out, and a dangerous sling tackle by Brisbane's Nat Grider gave O'Loughlin a shot a goal from point blank range, which she easily converted. North Melbourne came out victors by thirty points. Libby Birch became the first AFLW player to win three premierships with three different clubs, having previously won with the Western Bulldogs in 2018 and with Melbourne in 2022.

== Best-on-ground medal ==
The best-on-ground medal was presented by former Richmond president Peggy O'Neal. The panel to decide the medal consisted of Kate McCarthy (chair, Seven Network), Sarah Black (AFL Media), Ed Bourke (NCA NewsWire) and Jess Webster (Fox Footy).

=== Voting ===
Best on ground medal voting tally
Position	Player	Club	Total votes	Vote summary
1st	Jasmine Garner	North Melbourne	11	3, 3, 3, 2
2nd	Emma Kearney	North Melbourne	8	3, 2, 2, 1
3rd	Ash Riddell	North Melbourne	4	2, 1, 1
4th	Alice O'Loughlin	North Melbourne	1	1

Best-on-ground votes
Voter	3 votes	2 votes	1 vote
Kate McCarthy (chair, Seven Network)	Jasmine Garner	Emma Kearney	Ash Riddell
Sarah Black (AFL Media)	Jasmine Garner	Ash Riddell	Emma Kearney
Ed Bourke (NCA NewsWire)	Emma Kearney	Jasmine Garner	Alice O'Loughlin
Jess Webster (Fox Footy)	Jasmine Garner	Emma Kearney	Ash Riddell

== Media coverage ==
=== Television ===
Seven's coverage, simulcast on streaming service 7+, began at 7 pm AEDT. Abbey Holmes hosted the broadcast from the ground, with analysis coming from Kate McCarthy and Erin Phillips. The match was commentated by Jason Bennett, Jo Wotton, Abbey Holmes, Kate McCarthy, Erin Phillips and Nat Edwards. The game had a national reach of 1.236 million people with a national average audience of 354,000 across the Seven Network.

Fox Footy's coverage, simulcast on Kayo Sports and for the first time ever, BINGE, began at 7 pm AEDT. Kelli Underwood hosted the broadcast from Fox Footy's Studios in Southbank, with analysis coming from Collingwood star and 2-time AFLW All-Australian Ruby Schleicher and Western Bulldogs 2018 premiership player and 3-time AFLW All-Australian Ellie Blackburn. Fox Footy commentator Jess Webster provided interviews and updates from Ikon Park during the broadcast. Fox Footy simulcast the Seven Network coverage with Seven's commentators and graphics for the game.

=== Radio ===
Radio broadcasters
Station	Region	Callers	Special Comments	Boundary Riders
Triple M	National	Jack Heverin, Barry Denner	Sarah Hosking, Ethan Meldrum (statistician)	Joseph Pignataro
ABC Radio	National	Matt Clinch, Lauren Bordin	Chyloe Kurdas, Kerryn Peterson, Meg Hutchins	Marnie Vinall
AFL Nation (Note: The AFL Nation coverage was heard on SEN1116 in Melbourne.)	National	Matthew Cocks	Melissa Kuys	N/A
3AW (Note: 3AW's coverage was heard on 4BC in Brisbane, 6PR in Perth and FiveAA in Adelaide.)	Melbourne, VIC	Bruce Eva, Shane McInnes	Matt Skubis, Maddy Prespakis	Emilia Fuller

=== International ===
International broadcasters
Country	Channel	FTA/Pay/Stream	Live/Delay
Asia-Pacific	ABC Australia	FTA	Live
New Zealand	Sky Sport 9	Pay	Live
Pacific Islands	PacificAus TV	FTA	Live
United Kingdom	TNT Sports 2 discovery+	Pay; Stream	Live
Ireland	TG4	FTA	Live
United States	Fox Sports 2	Pay	Live
Canada	TSN 2	Pay	Live
Latin America	Disney+	Stream	Live
