= Alice O'Loughlin =

Personal information
- Full name: Alice O'Loughlin
- Born: 8 July 2002 (age 24)
- Original teams: Oakleigh Cannons (Talent League Girls; Kew Comets (YJFL)
- Draft: No. 22, 2020 draft
- Debut: Round 1, 2021, North Melbourne vs. Geelong, at Kardinia Park
- Height: 170 cm (5 ft 7 in)
- Position: Forward

Club information
- Current club: North Melbourne
- Number: 6

Playing career^{1}
| Years | Club | Games (Goals) |
| 2021– | North Melbourne | 59 (46) |
- ^{1} Playing statistics correct to the end of 2025.

Career highlights
- 2× AFL Women's premiership player: 2024, 2025; All-Australian team: 2024; North Melbourne leading goalkicker: 2024; 2× 22under22 team: 2023, 2024

Alice O'Loughlin (born 8 July 2002) is a professional Australian rules footballer playing for North Melbourne in the AFL Women's (AFLW).

She was initially drafted to North Melbourne with pick 22 in the 2020 AFL Women's draft.

== AFL Women's career ==
O'Loughlin made her debut in round 1 of the 2021 season against Geelong.

She had a breakout season in 2024, kicking 19 goals for the season and becoming her club's leading goalkicker in a premiership year. She was also selected in the All-Australian team for the first time and earned her second selection in the 22 Under 22 team. Late in 2025, O'Loughlin suffered a rare internal injury as she lacerated her liver in a match against Carlton. Despite the injury, O'Loughlin's success was compounded in 2025 as she won back-to-back premierships with North Melbourne.
