= Darren Crocker =

Australian rules footballer and coach (born 1967)

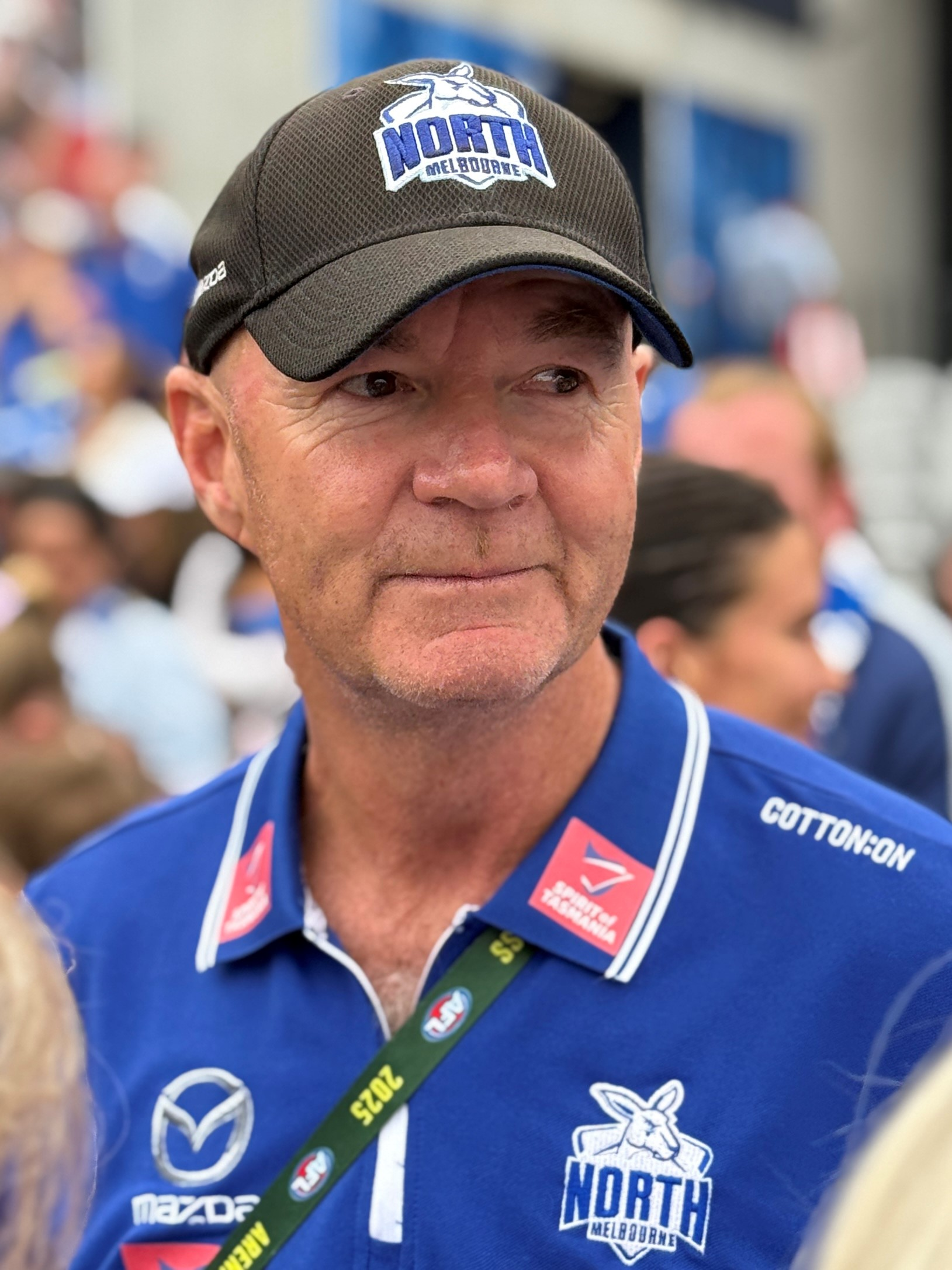
- Crocker in November 2025

Personal information
- Full name: Darren Crocker
- Born: 26 March 1967 (age 59)
- Original team: Belgrave
- Height: 189 cm (6 ft 2 in)
- Weight: 88 kg (194 lb)
- Position: Half-forward/Forward pocket

Playing career^{1}
Years	Club	Games (Goals)
1985–1998	North Melbourne	165 (119)

Coaching career^{3}
Years	Club	Games (W–L–D)
2009; 2015; 2016	North Melbourne	15 (6–8–1)
2021–	North Melbourne (W)	76 (58–16–2)
- ^{1} Playing statistics correct to the end of 1998.^{3} Coaching statistics correct as of 2025 season.

Career highlights
- AFL premiership player: 1996; AFLW premiership coach: 2024, 2025

Darren Crocker (born 26 March 1967) is a former Australian rules footballer who is currently the coach of the North Melbourne AFL Women's team. He formerly played for, and was on three occasions a caretaker coach of, the North Melbourne Football Club in the Australian Football League (AFL).

== Playing career ==
Crocker played in the 1996 AFL Grand Final against the Sydney Swans.

== Coaching career ==
On 16 June 2009, he was appointed caretaker senior coach of the North Melbourne Football Club after the resignation of Dean Laidley. On 17 August 2009 the North Melbourne Football Club appointed Brad Scott as their senior coach, thus Crocker was not retained as North Melbourne coach for the 2010 season. However, he remained as assistant coach at North Melbourne Football Club. In 2015, Crocker again served as acting coach when Scott underwent back surgery, and again for one match in 2016 when Scott was ill.

On 4 June 2020, Crocker was appointed as coach of the North Melbourne AFL Women's side, following the departure of inaugural coach Scott Gowans.

During the 2024 AFL Women's season, Crocker would lead North Melbourne to an undefeated record, en route to the club's maiden premiership in the 2024 AFLW Grand Final against the Brisbane Lions AFL Women's side. For his efforts, Crocker was named AFLW Coach's Association Coach of the Year.

In 2025, Crocker and North Melbourne would go one better, winning every single game and completing a perfect season, becoming the league's first side to win back-to-back premierships.

== Personal life ==
He is married with four children.

== Statistics ==
=== Playing statistics ===
Legend
G	Goals	K	Kicks	D	Disposals	T	Tackles
B	Behinds	H	Handballs	M	Marks

Season	Team	No.	Games	Totals							Averages (per game)							Votes
Season	Team	No.	Games	G	B	K	H	D	M	T	G	B	K	H	D	M	T	Votes
1985	North Melbourne	49	13	8	6	111	62	173	49	—N/a	0.6	0.5	8.5	4.8	13.3	3.8	—N/a	0
1986	North Melbourne	14	11	8	4	94	45	139	43	—N/a	0.7	0.4	8.5	4.1	12.6	3.9	—N/a	0
1987	North Melbourne	27	15	11	5	177	74	251	59	29	0.7	0.3	11.8	4.9	16.7	3.9	1.9	7
1988	North Melbourne	27	4	0	2	36	14	50	11	2	0.0	0.5	9.0	3.5	12.5	2.8	0.5	0
1989	North Melbourne	27	9	12	5	75	34	109	37	14	1.3	0.6	8.3	3.8	12.1	4.1	1.6	0
1990	North Melbourne	27	14	5	11	154	60	214	43	18	0.4	0.8	11.0	4.3	15.3	3.1	1.3	8
1991	North Melbourne	27	15	4	3	147	73	220	56	10	0.3	0.2	9.8	4.9	14.7	3.7	0.7	2
1992	North Melbourne	27	22	16	15	290	141	431	82	32	0.7	0.7	13.2	6.4	19.6	3.7	1.5	3
1993	North Melbourne	27	14	10	10	152	61	213	47	26	0.7	0.7	10.9	4.4	15.2	3.4	2.3	0
1994	North Melbourne	27	14	7	3	128	98	226	50	15	0.5	0.2	9.1	7.0	16.1	3.6	1.1	4
1995	North Melbourne	27	3	5	1	17	10	27	9	4	1.7	0.3	5.7	3.3	9.0	3.0	1.3	0
1996†	North Melbourne	27	15	20	15	94	29	123	42	15	1.3	1.0	6.3	1.9	8.2	2.8	1.0	4
1997	North Melbourne	27	9	10	4	25	14	39	6	4	1.1	0.4	3.1	2.9	6.0	1.1	0.7	0
Career			165	119	90	1522	735	2257	542	174	0.7	0.5	9.2	4.5	13.7	3.3	1.2	28

=== Coaching statistics ===
Legend
W	Wins	L	Losses	D	Draws	W%	Winning percentage	LP	Ladder position	LT	League teams

Season	Team	Games	W	L	D	W %	LP	LT
2009	North Melbourne (AFL)	10	3	6	1	35.0%	13	16
2015	North Melbourne (AFL)	4	2	2	0	50.0%	—N/a	—N/a
2016	North Melbourne (AFL)	1	1	0	0	100.0%	—N/a	—N/a
2021	North Melbourne (AFLW)	10	6	4	0	60.0%	6	14
2022 (S6)	North Melbourne (AFLW)	11	7	4	0	57.1%	4	14
2022 (S7)	North Melbourne (AFLW)	13	8	4	1	61.5%	8	18
2023	North Melbourne (AFLW)	13	9	4	0	69.2%	3	18
2024	North Melbourne (AFLW)	14	13	0	1	92.8%	1	18
2025	North Melbourne (AFLW)	8	8	0	0	100.0%	—N/a	18
Career totals		77	50	24	3	64.9%		
