= Nicole Bresnehan =

Australian rules footballer

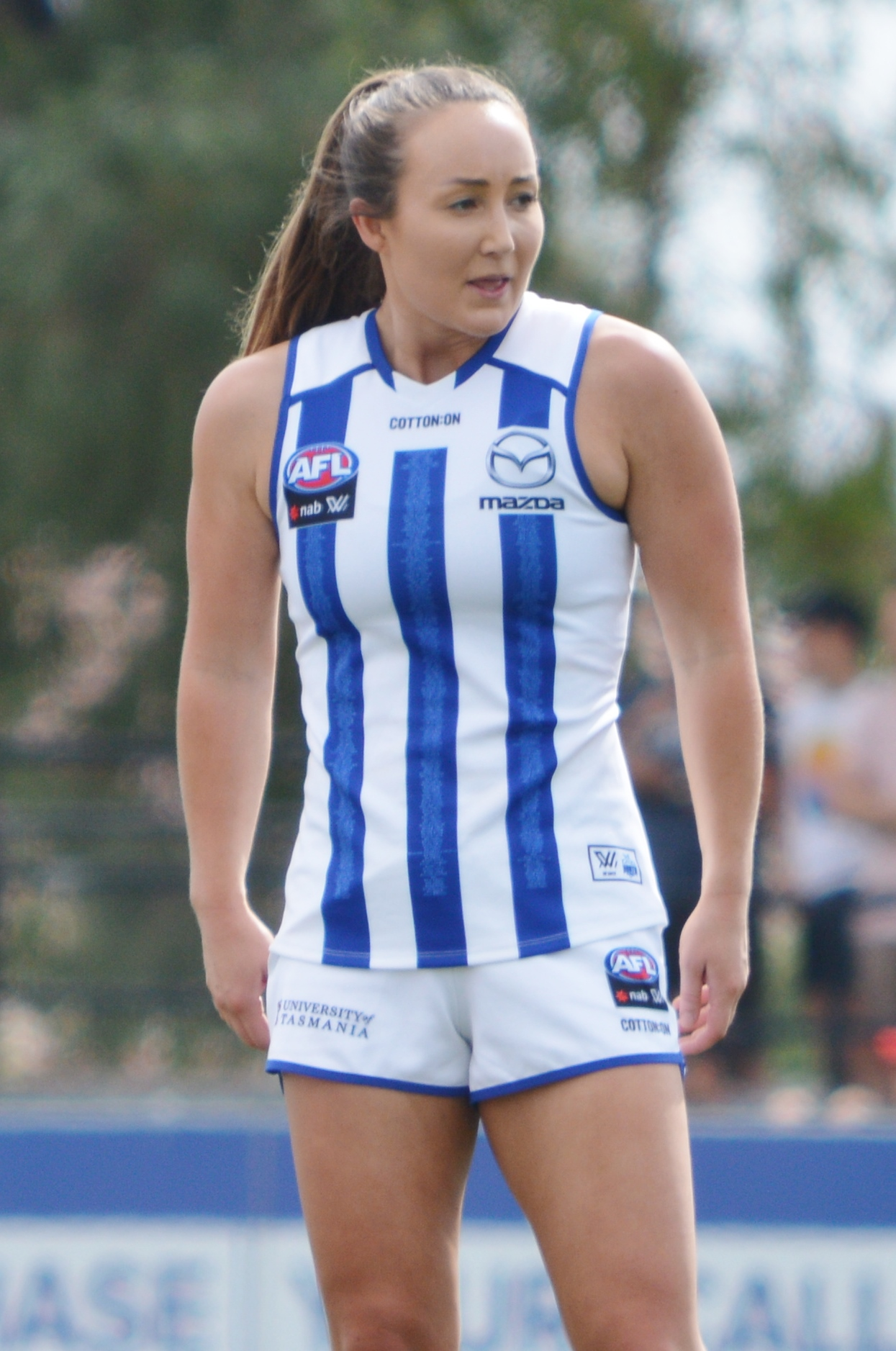
- Bresnehan with North Melbourne in January 2019

Personal information
- Born: 25 March 1997 (age 29)
- Original team: Clarence (TSL Women's)
- Debut: Round 1, 2019, North Melbourne vs. Carlton, at North Hobart Oval
- Height: 168 cm (5 ft 6 in)
- Position: Utility

Club information
- Current club: North Melbourne
- Number: 12

Playing career^{1}
Years	Club	Games (Goals)
2019–	North Melbourne	63 (0)
- ^{1} Playing statistics correct to the end of the 2023 season.

Career highlights
- AFLW premiership player: 2024

Nicole Bresnehan (born 25 March 1997) is an Australian rules footballer playing for the North Melbourne Football Club in the AFL Women's competition (AFLW). Bresnehan was drafted by North Melbourne with the club's fifth selection and the 63rd pick overall in the 2018 AFL Women's draft. She made her debut in the club's inaugural match, a 36-point victory over Carlton at North Hobart Oval in the opening round of the 2019 season. It was reported that she signed on with the club for one more season on 17 June 2021, tying her to the club until the end of 2022.

== Statistics ==
Updated to the end of the 2024 season.

Legend
G	Goals	K	Kicks	D	Disposals	T	Tackles
B	Behinds	H	Handballs	M	Marks
#	Played in that season's premiership team

Season	Team	No.	Games	Totals							Averages (per game)							Votes
Season	Team	No.	Games	G	B	K	H	D	M	T	G	B	K	H	D	M	T	Votes
2019	North Melbourne	12	4	0	0	15	8	23	7	7	0.0	0.0	3.8	2.0	5.8	1.8	1.8	
2020	North Melbourne	12	3	0	0	9	3	12	4	6	0.0	0.0	3.0	1.0	4.0	1.3	2.0	
2021	North Melbourne	12	10	0	0	44	27	71	19	25	0.0	0.0	4.4	2.7	7.1	1.9	2.5	
2022 (S6)	North Melbourne	12	13	0	0	102	52	154	47	52	0.0	0.0	4.8	3.8	8.6	1.3	2.6	
2022 (S7)	North Melbourne	12	11	0	1	53	42	95	14	29	0.0	0.1	7.8	4.0	11.8	3.6	4.0	
2023	North Melbourne	12	8	0	0	54	28	82	23	23	0.0	0.0	6.8	3.5	10.2	2.9	2.9	
2024^{#}	North Melbourne	12	14	0	0	97	68	165	34	33	0.0	0.0	6.9	4.9	11.8	2.4	2.4	
Career			63	0	1	374	228	604	148	175	0.0	0.0	5.9	3.6	9.6	2.3	2.8	
