= Tess Craven =

Australian rules footballer

Personal information
- Born: 23 December 2003 (age 22)
- Original team: Drysdale (Vic)/Geelong U18
- Draft: No. 13, 2021 AFLW draft
- Debut: Round 1, 2022 S6, North Melbourne vs. Geelong, at Arden Street Oval
- Height: 163 cm (5 ft 4 in)
- Position: Medium Forward

Club information
- Current club: North Melbourne
- Number: 5

Playing career^{1}
Years	Club	Games (Goals)
2022–	North Melbourne	40 (6)
- ^{1} Playing statistics correct to the end of the 2024 season.

Career highlights
- 2x AFLW premiership player: 2024, 2025

Tess Craven (born 23 December 2003) is an Australian rules football player for the North Melbourne football club's AFL Women's team.

Craven played her first AFLW game in the truncated 2022 AFL Women's season 6.

Craven kicked the first goal for North Melbourne when they defeated the Brisbane Lions in the 2024 AFL Women's Grand Final.

== Statistics ==
Updated to the end of the 2024 season.

Legend
G	Goals	K	Kicks	D	Disposals	T	Tackles
B	Behinds	H	Handballs	M	Marks
#	Played in that season's premiership team

Season	Team	No.	Games	Totals							Averages (per game)							Votes
Season	Team	No.	Games	G	B	K	H	D	M	T	G	B	K	H	D	M	T	Votes
2022 (S6)	North Melbourne	5	1	0	0	3	0	3	1	0	0.0	0.0	3.0	0.0	3.0	1.0	0.0	
2022 (S7)	North Melbourne	5	13	1	2	80	16	96	24	28	0.1	0.2	6.2	1.2	7.4	1.8	2.2	
2023	North Melbourne	5	12	2	1	72	21	93	17	19	0.2	0.1	6.0	1.8	7.8	1.4	1.6	
2024^{#}	North Melbourne	5	14	3	0	119	42	161	37	35	0.2	0.1	6.0	1.8	7.8	1.4	1.6	
Career			40	6	3	274	79	353	79	82	0.2	0.1	6.8	2.0	8.8	2.0	2.0	
