= North Melbourne Football Club =

Australian rules football club

Names
- Full name: North Melbourne Football Club Limited
- Former name(s): Hotham Football Club (1877–1888); Kangaroos Football Club (1999–2007)
- Nickname(s): Kangaroos, Kangas, Roos, North, Shinboners
- Motto: Victoria Amat Curam (Victory Demands Dedication)

2025 season
- Home-and-away season: 16th
- Leading goalkicker: Nick Larkey (41 goals)
- Syd Barker Medal: Tristan Xerri & Harry Sheezel

Club details
- Founded: 1869; 157 years ago
- Colours: Royal Blue White
- Competition: AFL: Senior men AFLW: Senior women VFL: Reserves men VFLW: Reserves women
- Chairperson: Sonja Hood
- CEO: Jennifer Watt
- Coach: AFL: Jaymie Graham; AFLW: Darren Crocker; VFL: Adam Marcon; VFLW: Alex McKenzie
- Captain(s): AFL: Nick Larkey; AFLW: Jasmine Garner; VFL: Darcy Macpherson; VFLW: Renee Tierney
- Membership (2025): ▲56,283
- Premierships: VFL/AFL (4): 1975; 1977; 1996; 1999; AFLW (2): 2024; 2025; Reserves/VFL (7): 1947; 1957; 1967; 1978; 1979; 1995; 1996; Under-19s (7): 1946; 1976; 1984; 1987; 1988; 1990; 1991; VFA (6): 1903; 1904; 1910; 1914; 1915; 1918; VFLW (2): 2024; 2025
- Ground: AFL: Marvel Stadium (56,347); Hands Oval (15,000); Optus Stadium (61,266); AFLW: Arden Street Oval (4,000); North Hobart Oval (10,000); University of Tasmania Stadium (21,000); VFL/VFLW: Arden Street Oval (4,000)
- Former ground: MCG (1984–2005); Arden Street Oval (1966–1985); Coburg City Oval (1965); Arden Street Oval (1925–1964)
- Training ground: Arden Street Oval

Uniforms
| Home | Away | Clash |

Other information

The North Melbourne Football Club, nicknamed the Kangaroos or colloquially the Roos, is a professional Australian rules football club. The men's team competes in the Australian Football League (AFL), and the women's team in the AFL Women's (AFLW). The Kangaroos also field a reserves men's team in the Victorian Football League (VFL) and women's team in the VFLW.

Informally founded in the suburb of North Melbourne in 1858 during the scratch matches era, its official foundaton date of 1869 makes it the fourth-oldest club in the competition. The club has been based at Arden Street Oval since 1882. Arden Street serves as its headquarters, training facilities and home ground for its women's side. The club's senior men's team plays its home matches at Marvel Stadium in the Docklands area of Melbourne, as well as Bellerive Oval in Hobart, Tasmania which is also used by the women's team as a secondary home ground.

The club's mascots are Kanga and Ruby. The usage of kangaroos on the team's brand dates from the mid-20th century. The club is also unofficially known as "The Shinboners", a term which dates to the 19th century. The club's motto is victoria amat curam, Latin for "victory demands dedication".

The Kangaroos have won four VFL/AFL premierships; in 1975, 1977 (after a replay), 1996 and 1999. They have also won two AFL Women's premiership; in 2024 and 2025.

== History ==
=== Formative years ===
The club's official foundation date of 1869 is based on Gerard Dowling's 1973 and 1997 work. Historian John Lindsay Robert Guest in 2025 drew on Gilberts work to strongly suggest that it was formed much earlier as an offshoot of the cricket club formed in 1855, with the football club starting around 1857 (which would make it older than Melbourne Football Club/Australian rules), having a continuous though poorly documented existence. Guest argues that the club took decades to formalise its constitution. Despite the absence of its original records of incorporation, the club has adopted 1869 as its official year of establishment.

The early football club between 1855 and 1859 was based at Graham's Paddock also known as Hotham Hill in North Melbourne. It had been actively searching for a more permanent home which it found at Royal Park in 1858. The borough was initially called North Melbourne, then Hotham from 1859, before the town reverted to its original name on August 27, 1887. The club primarily went by "North Melbourne Football Club" until 1876. As a foundation club of the Victorian Football Association (VFA) in 1877, the club was known as Hotham, reclaiming its original name, North Melbourne in 1888. James Henry Gardiner is cited as a significant figure during the formative period of the club and remains so.

A match between North Melbourne and the South Yarra Football Club appears in a 1865 newspaper article. A few weeks later, on 2 September, North Melbourne played South Yarra for the Challenge Cup. The predominantly Irish team was barred from the Challenge Cup, and the lack of public records from 1866 onward is likely to reflect this, with the club resorting to scratch matches.

On 14 August 1869, North Melbourne played the employees of Messrs, Walker, May, and Co. at Princes Bridge in what is now central Melbourne. North also fielded a second-20 team that day. North Melbourne defeated the Surrey Football Club at Royal Park on 18 September 1869. According to Dowling, Harry Fuhrhop was a pivotal figure among the generation of players being reported in the media from 1869. Fuhrop is listed regularly from 1869 representing the club as captain and a player, and further in 1884 as a general committee member. Other early newspaper reports include playing Carlton United at Royal Park on 24 September 1870, and 1 October 1870 against East Brunswick.

Regular premiership matches of Australian Football commenced in Victoria in 1870. Although North Melbourne was a part of this, it was classed as a "junior club". The words junior and senior at the time were not used to distinguish underage side but rather the playing quality and strength of the side. The Australasian noted them as being "one of the best of many junior clubs". The club graduated to senior ranks in 1874, finishing fourth. Along with the promotion, the club adopted its first uniform of blue and white horizontal stripes.

In 1876, twelve players from North Melbourne defected to join Albert Park. It was in 1939 that Brunswick resident Mr A.M. Alexander wrote in a letter to the editor of The Argus with numerous historical errors, that the dozen North Melbourne players which defected gave strong influence over their destination club, "Albert Park-cum-North Melbourne." No mention however is ever made by the Albert Park Football Club of them merging with North Melbourne, including no mention in their 1877 Annual General Meeting (AGM) reported by The Argus on 21 April 1877.

Despite the loss of twelve senior players in 1876, North Melbourne Football Club maintained its reserves team playing under the name Hotham United. The club's determination to continue football operations as Hotham United forced them to bolster their player stocks by recruiting youths who had recently completed their studies at St Mary's Anglican School. It was also in 1876 that the club played for the first time in their colours of blue and white. North Melbourne's ties to St Mary's Anglican School, established in 1853, began when students played football at the corner of Queens and Howard Streets. Impressed by the students' progress, the football committee recruited school leavers from St Mary's and increased recruitment from the school in 1876. This ultimately led the committee to adopt St Mary's blue and white colours in 1876, which continue to be reflected in the club's colours today. Recruits in 1876 included Sam Butt, who would later captain the club in the 1880s. For the clubs monumental efforts to keep North afloat, the rewards came in 1877 when the Victorian Football (VFA) accepted them as Hotham Football Club as a foundation member of the elite VFA competition.

Royal Park served as the club's home ground until 1882, when they moved to the Hotham Cricket Ground (now Arden Street Oval).

=== Association years ===
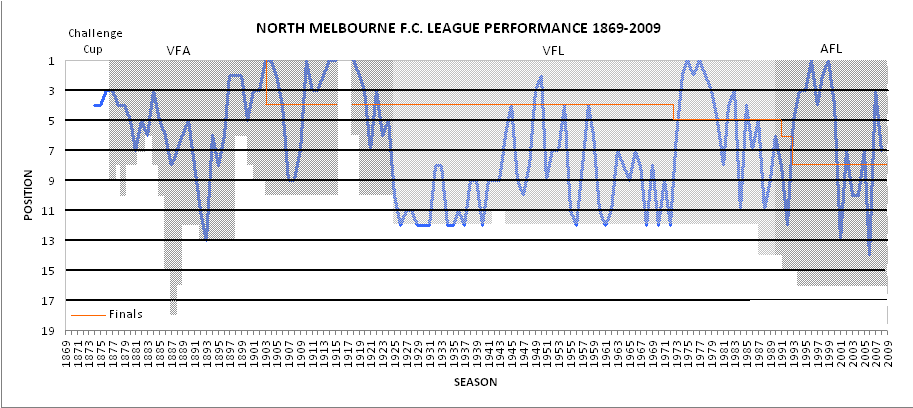
Chart showing the progress of North Melbourne F.C. through the VFA and V/AFL

Football took a significant step forward in 1877, with the formation of the Victorian Football Association (VFA), the first properly constituted administrative body in the colony of Victoria. Hotham was one of five senior metropolitan clubs to compete in the inaugural season.

In 1882, Hotham football club once again became co-located with the Hotham Cricket Club when they moved into the North Melbourne Recreation Reserve (Arden Street Oval). The move was part of an effort to improve the ground improvements at the Hotham Cricket Ground, which was the name of the Reserve at the time, and a few years after the football club was given legal control of the cricket club in 1879 (citation to follow).

In 1886, the club adopted the traditional uniform of blue and white vertical stripes at the insistence of the VFA, who wanted a visible contrast between Geelong's and Hotham's uniforms. Additionally, the club returned to its original "North Melbourne Football Club" name on 30 March 1888 after the local government area reverted its name to North Melbourne.

The 1880s saw the club develop a penchant for inter-colonial travel with trips to Tasmania (1881 and 1887) and South Australia (1889). Hotham also found itself well represented at the first ever intercolonial representative game in 1879, with four players from the club gaining selection for Victoria.

=== Disregarded by the VFL ===
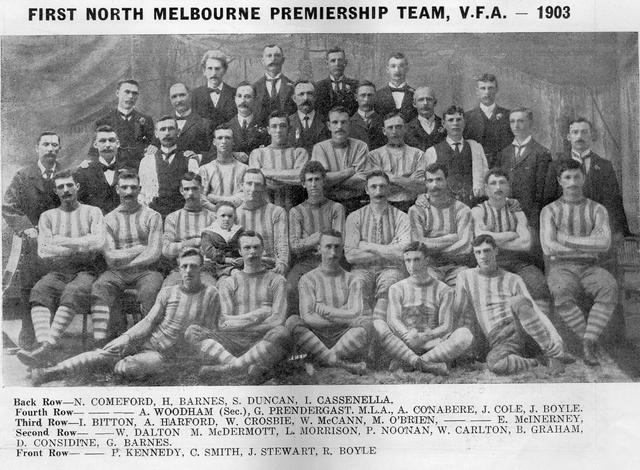
"The Inaugurals". The side that brought North premiership glory after 34 years of wait. To commemorate the achievement, club President G/M Prendergast presented the 26 players and head trainer with a gold medal at the club's general meeting that year.

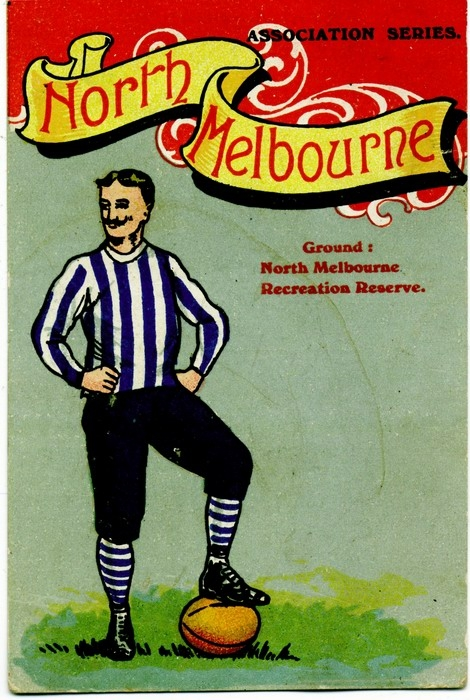
A VFA cigarette card from 1906

The VFA grew to 13 senior clubs in the 1890s. Led by Geelong and Essendon, the largest clubs of the VFA formed their own breakaway league, the Victorian Football League (VFL), in 1896. Despite finishing 6th in 1896, North Melbourne was not invited to the breakaway competition. The main reasons for being excluded were:

- North had not won a premiership yet, and thus was not considered a powerful club
- The industrialisation of the locality had drained the club's income streams
- The club had a strong reputation for hooliganism from their fans
- There was a lot of bad blood between Collingwood and North following a torrid engagement in the previous season
- Essendon felt threatened by the proximity of North Melbourne
- A court case against the North Melbourne Cricket Club had damaged the Football Club's status

North continued on in the depleted VFA, emerging as a powerhouse, finishing 2nd in 1897, 1898 and 1899. In 1903, after 34 years of competing, the club won its first premiership, defeating Richmond in the final. The club became back to back premiers in 1904 after Richmond forfeited the grand final due to the appointment of an umpire whose performance when the two teams met earlier in the year was severely criticised by Richmond players and officials.

North merged with fellow VFA football club West Melbourne in 1907, which at the time had lost its home ground. The joint venture saw a chance of promotion, and the club applied for admission to the more prestigious VFL in 1908, but Richmond and University were admitted instead. North was kicked out of the VFA during the 1907/08 offseason as a result of applying to join the VFL, before the local community re-established the North Melbourne Football Club under a new committee, successfully enabling the club to play in the VFA in the 1908 season.

=== "The Invincibles" ===
The reformation of the club necessitated a massive cleanout of the team, leaving only two players remaining from the previous season. The 1910 season was marked by one of the most sensational transfers in Victorian football history, when Andy Curran masterminded the clearance of Carlton's famed "Big Four" of 'Mallee' Johnson, Fred Jinks, Charlie Hammond and Frank 'Silver' Caine to North Melbourne. These signings secured the Northerners' third premiership in 1910.

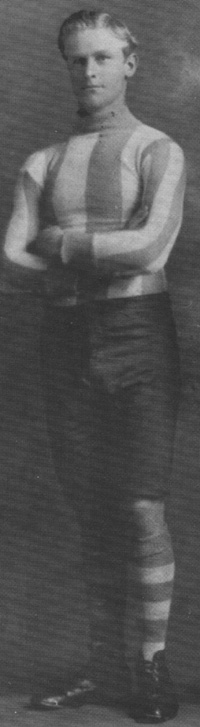
Syd Barker, Sr., club legend and star ruckman of "The Invincibles" era.

The 1912 finals series was one of the most amazing ever, with the semi-final having to be played three times, after North and Brunswick drew twice. North was eventually victorious and moved on to the final, but lost the game by a mere four points with the last kick of the day.

The next few years were punctuated by "The Invincibles". In the Northerners' most illustrious period ever, the club went undefeated from 1914 to 1919, collecting premierships in 1914, 1915 and 1918 – the competition was in recess in 1916 and 1917 due to World War I. As well as this, the club won the championship in both 1915 and 1918 for finishing on top of the ladder, and accounted for VFL side St Kilda comfortably. During this period the club won 58 consecutive matches including 49 successive premiership matches, a record that has remained unmatched in Association or League history since.

Despite being rejected from the VFL in both 1896 and 1907, North persisted in trying to gain admission into the League. On 30 June 1921, North told its players it would disband and try to gain entry to the VFL by the 'back-door'. Essendon League Football Club had lost its playing ground at East Melbourne and had decided to acquire the North Melbourne Recreation Reserve as a new playing ground. North accepted their proposal in the idea that the clubs would amalgamate. All of North's players were urged to join the Essendon League Club to help facilitate the amalgamation. The amalgamation was foiled when some members of the VFA launched a successful legal challenge. As a result, the Essendon League Club moved instead to the Essendon Oval, replacing the ground's original occupants, Essendon Association.

North was now without a playing team and the Essendon Association Club was now without a ground, so as a matter of convenience the two clubs amalgamated so they could compete in the 1922 season. As it had after the merger with West Melbourne, North once again managed to avert its destruction. During this Period, North's main rivals were Footscray, meeting them in three Grand Finals.

=== Entering the VFL ===
Chart of yearly ladder positions for North Melbourne in VFL/AFL

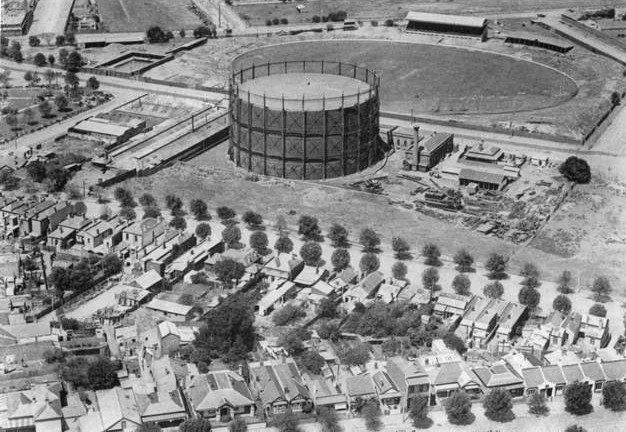
North Melbourne and Arden St Oval after admission to the VFL. c. 1928

After three attempts, 29 years of waiting and numerous other applications to enter the VFL, finally North was rewarded for its persistence with admittance to the League in 1925, along with Footscray and Hawthorn. Even then, the opportunity was almost lost as the League delegates debated into the early hours of the morning on which clubs should be invited to join the intake. It was only after much deliberation that North Melbourne's name was eventually substituted for Prahran's making North "the lucky side" of the invitees that included Footscray and Hawthorn. North Melbourne was forced to change its uniform to avoid a clash when it joined the VFL.

North Melbourne struggled for most of its first twenty-five years in the VFL, with one of few bright notes being Sel Murray winning the VFL Leading Goalkicker Medal in 1941 with 88 goals. By the late 1940s, North Melbourne had developed a strong list and significant supporter base. In 1949 North secured the VFL Minor Premiership, finishing top of the ladder at the end of the home-and-away season with 14 wins and 5 losses. They failed to make the Grand Final that year (eventually won by Essendon), but in 1950 they did reach the final, but were defeated by Essendon. It was in this year that the club adopted the "Kangaroos" mascot.

In February 1965, North Melbourne moved its playing and training base from the Arden Street Oval to Coburg Oval, signing a seven-year lease with the City of Coburg after initially negotiating long-term leases for up to 40 years. The club came to an arrangement to merge with the VFA's Coburg Football Club, whom it was displacing from the ground; fourteen Coburg committeemen joined the North Melbourne committee, but the merger was never completed after Coburg established a rival committee which remained loyal to the VFA. The lease at Coburg lasted only eight months; the Coburg council was hesitant to build a new grandstand without the security of a long-term lease, and neither party made the returns they expected, so it was terminated by mutual agreement in September 1965 and North Melbourne returned to the Arden Street Oval.

On field, the 1950s and 1960s were lean years for North Melbourne, though the club did secure two consecutive Night Premierships in 1965 and 1966. Allen Aylett was a brilliant player in the late 1950s and early 1960s (and captain between 1961 and 1964), as was Noel Teasdale, who lost the Brownlow Medal on a countback in 1965 (he was later awarded a retrospective medal when the counting system was amended).

=== Golden era ===
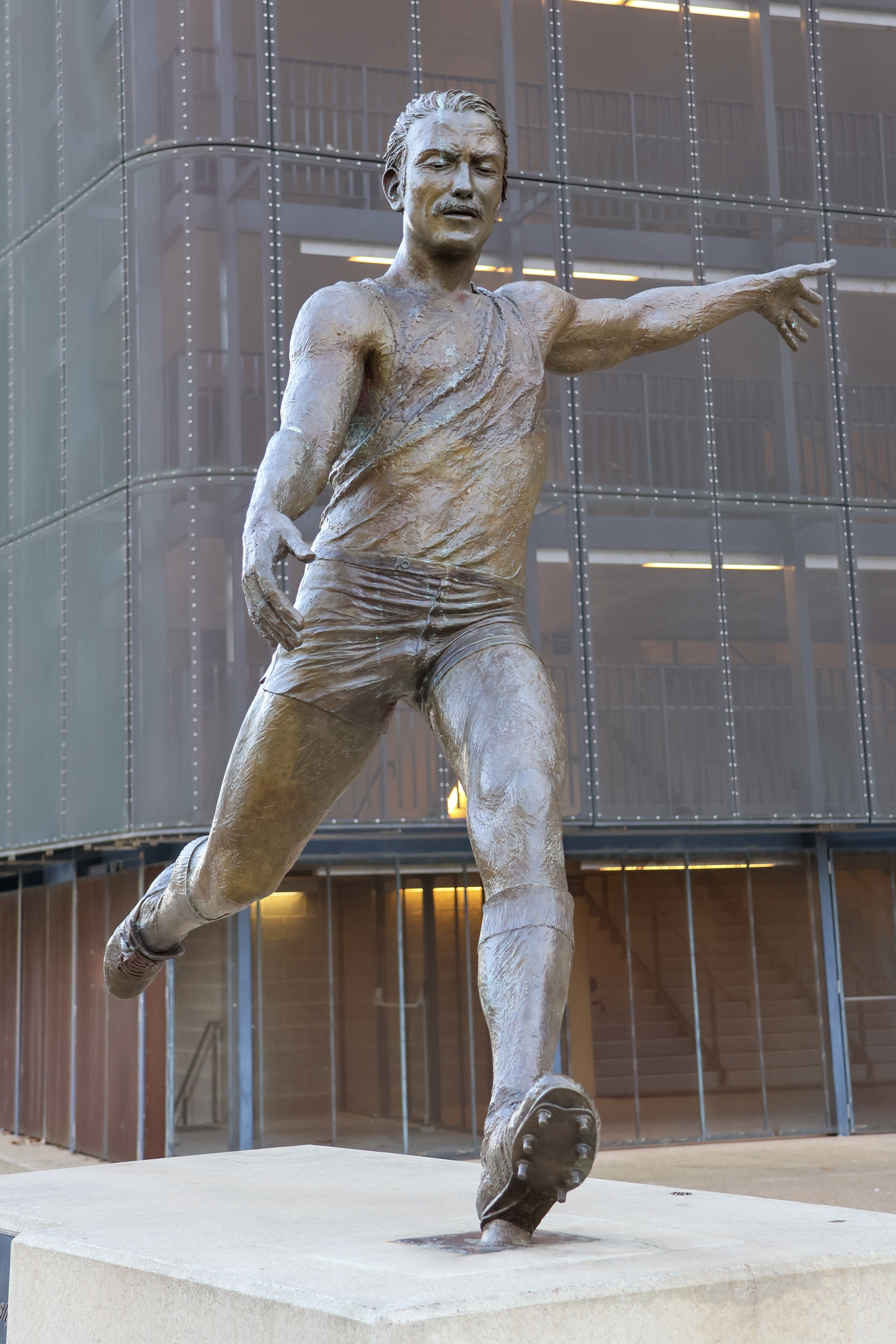
Malcolm Blight was one of the stars of the 1970s premiership era, and won both a Brownlow Medal and Coleman Medal while at North Melbourne.

In the late 1960s, under the leadership of Allen Aylett, North Melbourne began its climb to supremacy. As part of a major recruitment drive North secured the services of several big-name stars, including Barry Davis from Essendon, Doug Wade from Geelong, John Rantall from South Melbourne, and Barry Cable from Perth. In a major coup, the great Ron Barassi was appointed coach in 1973. Barrassi reversed the club's playing fortunes, taking a struggling team that was once regarded as the traditional cellar dwellers of the competition through to a golden era of success that transformed North Melbourne into one of the powerhouses of the VFL. Barassi took North to a Grand Final (losing to Richmond by 41 points) in 1974 and brought success in his 1975 and 1977 seasons. North made five consecutive Grand Finals from 1974 to 1978 and defeated Norwood in the 1975 national championship and thus declared Champions of Australia.

| 1975 VFL Grand Final | G | B | Total |
| Hawthorn | 9 | 13 | 67 |
| North Melbourne | 19 | 8 | 122 |
| Venue: Melbourne Cricket Ground | Crowd: 110,551 |

In 1973 and 1974, North's wingman Keith Greig (recruited from Brunswick Football Club, Victoria) won consecutive Brownlow Medals; forward Malcolm Blight (recruited from Woodville Football Club, South Australia) then won the award in 1978. Doug Wade (recruited from Geelong Football Club, Geelong) won the Coleman Medal in 1974 with his 103 goals for the season.

| 1977 VFL Grand Final | G | B | Total |
| North Melbourne | 21 | 25 | 151 |
| Collingwood | 19 | 10 | 124 |
| Venue: Melbourne Cricket Ground | Crowd: 98,491 |

Barassi remained team coach until 1980, but only a Night Premiership in that year resulted in him leaving Arden Street. North then entered another period of decline, though Malcolm Blight kicked 103 goals to take out the Coleman medal in 1982, and another Brownlow win came through the talented Ross Glendinning in 1983. In that year, North Melbourne won a third Minor Premiership with 16 wins and 6 losses for the season, but they failed to make the Grand Final.

=== Team of the 1990s ===
Despite the tough, disciplined coaching of the legendary John Kennedy, the 1980s and early 1990s were mostly lean years for the Kangaroos. However, the rebuilding of the club was taking place. The Krakouer brothers (Jim and Phil) brought a spark into the side and lifted many hopes for North supporters and the excitement to the general football public. The innovative idea of night games was instigated by the club and meeting the challenges, the club survived. One major highlight was the recruitment of forward John Longmire in 1989, who topped the club goalkicking over five consecutive seasons (1990–1994) and won the Coleman medal in 1990 with 98 goals. At the beginning of the 1993 season, in a dramatic and controversial move, the board of the club sacked coach and long-time player Wayne Schimmelbusch, and appointed Denis Pagan in his place. Results were immediate, as North reached the finals for the first time in nearly a decade.

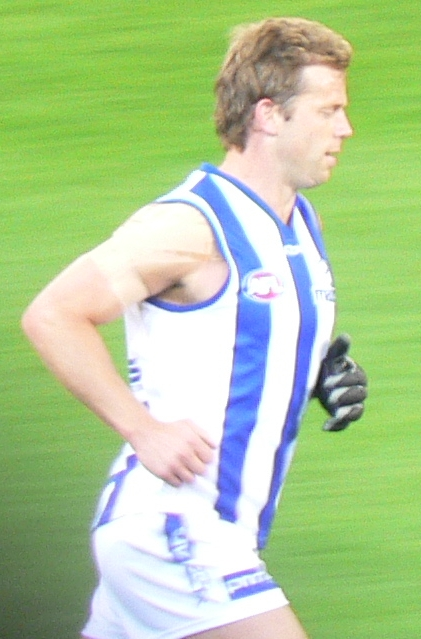
1990s dual-premiership player and Norm Smith Medallist Glenn Archer was named "Shinboner of the Century" as the player who most embodies the North Melbourne spirit.

Pagan was instrumental in appointing young centre half-forward Wayne Carey as the club's youngest-ever captain. Carey had been recruited at the same time as Longmire, but had taken longer to develop as a player. Over the next nine seasons, Carey came to be regarded as the standout player in the league and was known as 'the King'.

| 1996 AFL Grand Final | G | B | Total |
| North Melbourne | 19 | 17 | 131 |
| Sydney Swans | 13 | 10 | 88 |
| Venue: Melbourne Cricket Ground | Crowd: 93,102 |

| 1995 AFL Ansett Australia Cup Final | G | B | Total |
| North Melbourne | 14 | 9 | 93 |
| Adelaide | 8 | 15 | 63 |
| Venue: Waverley Park | Crowd: 49,393 |

North Melbourne became a powerhouse through the 1990s under Pagan and Carey, and finished in the top four, making the preliminary finals or better, in every season from 1994 until 2000. After being eliminated in the preliminary finals in 1994 and 1995, North went on to defeat the Sydney Swans in the 1996 Grand Final to take out the club's third premiership, and the gold centenary AFL cup; Glenn Archer won the Norm Smith Medal. The club was again eliminated in the preliminary final in 1997. In 1998, as the club won both the pre-season Ansett Cup and topped the ladder with 16 wins and 6 losses, but went on to lose the 1998 Grand Final to Adelaide, not helped by an inaccurate goalkicking performance of 8.22 (70) to Adelaide's 15.15 (105). In 1999, the Kangaroos finished the regular season in second position on the ladder, and went on to defeat Carlton in the Grand Final, winning the club's fourth VFL/AFL premiership; former Sydney midfielder Shannon Grant taking out the Norm Smith Medal. The club was eliminated in the preliminary finals in 2000 against Melbourne.

| 1999 AFL Grand Final | G | B | Total |
| Kangaroos | 19 | 10 | 124 |
| Carlton | 12 | 17 | 89 |
| Venue: Melbourne Cricket Ground | Crowd: 94,228 |

| 1998 AFL Ansett Australia Cup Final | G | B | Total |
| North Melbourne | 14 | 13 | 97 |
| St Kilda | 12 | 11 | 83 |
| Venue: Waverley Park | Crowd: 63,898 |

In 1996, the club was in advanced merger talks with the financially depleted Fitzroy Football Club to create the North Fitzroy Kangaroos Football Club; however, Fitzroy ultimately merged with the Brisbane Bears instead.

Seeking new markets and greater financial security in an increasingly corporatized AFL environment, the title "North Melbourne" was officially dropped from the logo in 1999, during which time the team played only as the "Kangaroos". During the successful 1999 season, North Melbourne played home games in Sydney with a view of becoming a second team in New South Wales; however, the experiment was not successful, with crowds averaging only 12,000.

=== 21st century ===
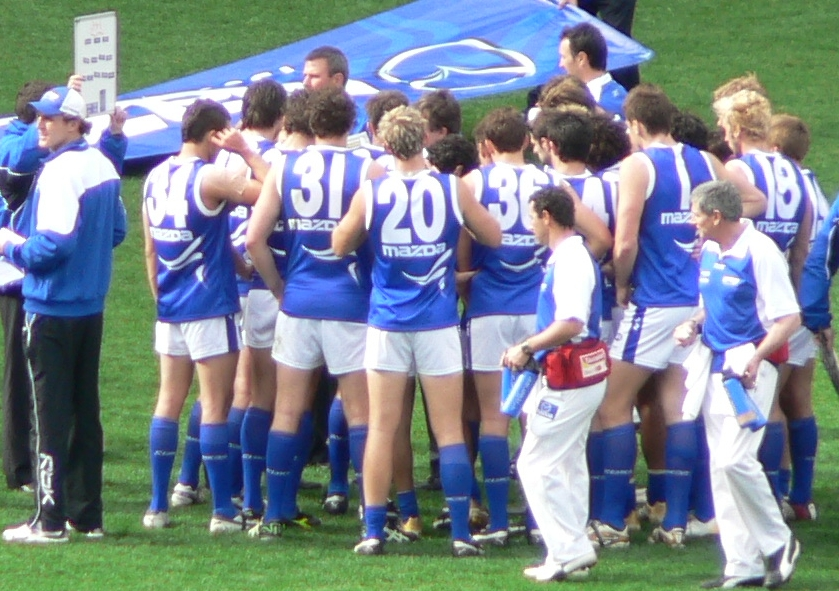
A Kangaroos quarter-time team huddle at the MCG in 2006

North's dominance of the league did not continue into the 21st century. Its decade-long on-field potency was in decline, and questions were raised about its financial position and long-term sustainability. Furthermore, three of the people most important to the club's success in the 1990s left the club under acrimonious circumstances: CEO Greg Miller left the club, captain Wayne Carey left prior to the 2002 season following an extramarital affair with the wife of teammate and vice captain Anthony Stevens, and coach Denis Pagan was lured to Carlton at the end of 2002. Pagan was replaced by 1996 premiership player Dean Laidley, who had previously been an assistant coach at Collingwood from 1999 until the end of season 2002.

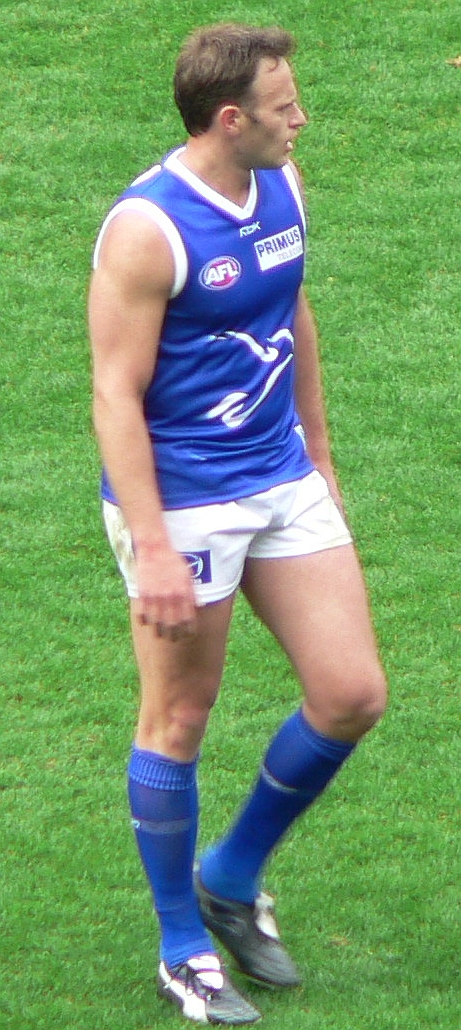
Cult hero Sav Rocca led the goal kicking in the early 2000s.

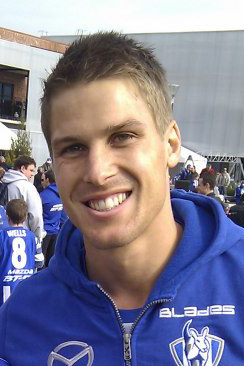
Three-time Syd Barker Medallist Andrew Swallow captained the club in the 2010s.

On a post-season holiday, several players were caught in the 2002 Bali bombings terrorist attack, notably defender Jason McCartney, who suffered second-degree burns to over 50% of his body while carrying others to safety and nearly died during surgery after being flown back to Melbourne. In what is regarded as one of the most inspirational stories of Australian rules football and Australian sport in general, McCartney successfully returned to action on 6 June 2003 against Richmond at Docklands Stadium. Playing at full-forward, he took a mark in the final quarter, scored a goal from the resulting set shot, and set up Leigh Harding's winning goal with two minutes remaining. McCartney retired immediately after the game, citing that his recovery had left him spent, and he was chaired from the ground. McCartney wore the numbers "88" and "202" on the front of his long-sleeved guernsey for the match, signifying the Australian and total number of victims of the Bali bombings, while many in the crowd bore signs reading "Bali 88/202".

Onfield, the club reached the elimination finals in 2002 and 2004. After a top-4 finish and a preliminary final berth in 2007, and a first-round elimination final exit in 2008, North Melbourne dropped to 13th in 2009, and coach Dani Laidley announced her resignation, with Darren Crocker acting as caretaker coach for the rest of the season, to eventually be replaced by ex-Brisbane Lions premiership player and Collingwood assistant coach Brad Scott. A$15 million redevelopment of the Arden Street, which had started in 2006, was completed in 2009, giving the club top-class training facilities.

=== Brad Scott era ===
North Melbourne struggled in its first two years under Brad Scott, finishing 9th in both 2010 and 2011. In 2012, the club returned to the finals for the first time since 2008, finishing the season in 8th place, but would go down to the West Coast Eagles by 96 points in an elimination final. In 2012, the club began a three-year deal to play two games each year at Bellerive Oval in Hobart, Tasmania. The club finished 10th in 2013 in a season full of close losses. Nick Dal Santo signed with the club at the end of the 2013 season as a restricted free agent.

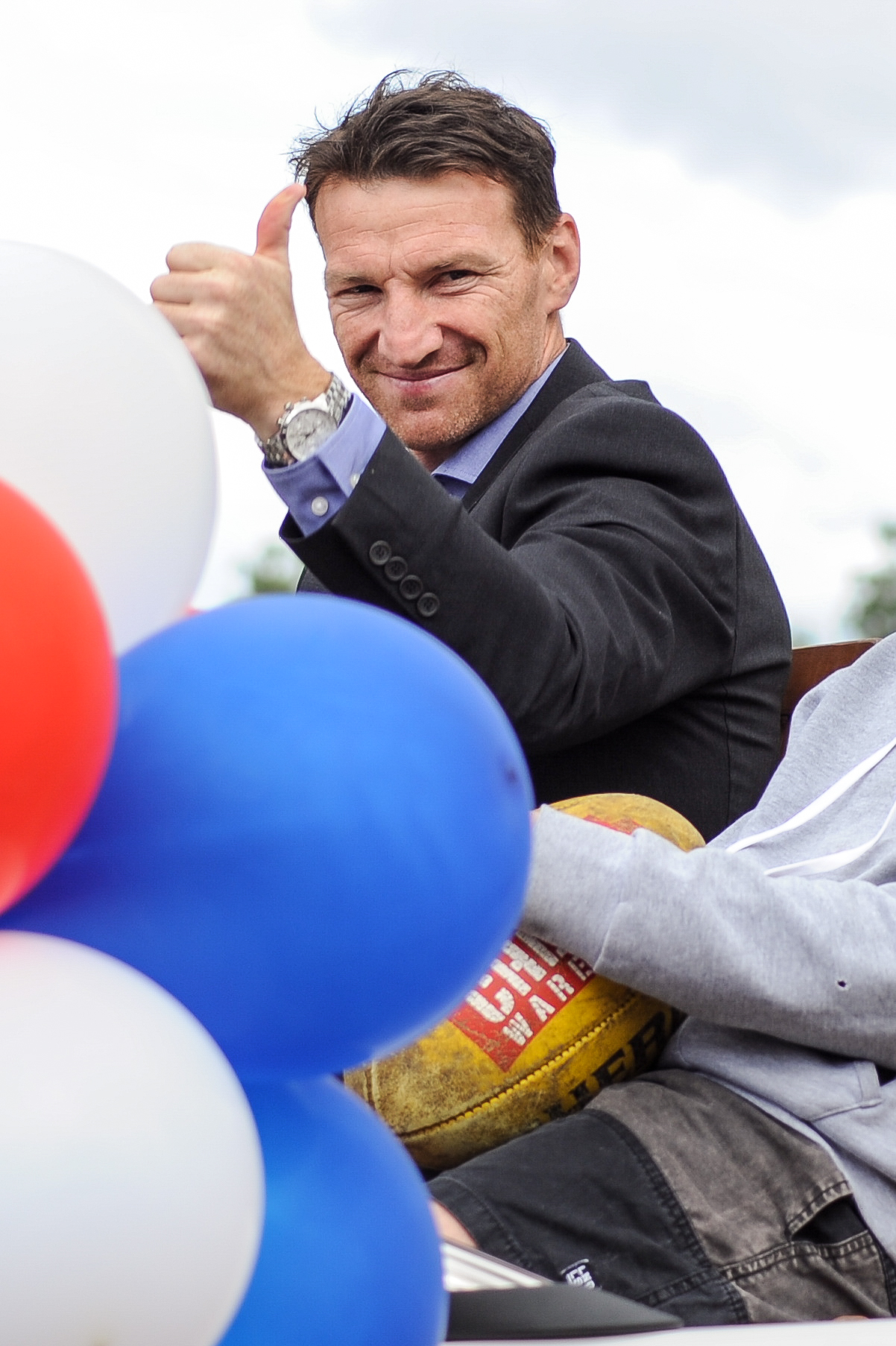
Brent Harvey broke the all-time AFL record for most career games in 2016, finishing with 432 games.

In 2014, North Melbourne finished 6th at the end of the home and away season and reached 40,000 members for the first time in the club's history. In September, North Melbourne went on to defeat Essendon by 12 points in the 2nd Elimination Final, only taking the lead in the last quarter. The following week, North Melbourne beat Geelong in the 2nd Semi-final by 6 points advancing them through to their first preliminary final since 2007. Their finals campaign came to a disappointing end at Stadium Australia when they were beaten by Sydney by 71 points. In 2015 the club made history by becoming the first team to qualify for a preliminary final from 8th spot, losing to the West Coast Eagles by 25 points after leading at half time. In 2016, North Melbourne won its first nine matches, which is the club's best start to a season in its VFL/AFL history. On 27 July 2016, the club announced it had surpassed 45,000 members for the first time in the club's history. In 2016, the Kangaroos fielded what was the oldest team in AFL history. Unfortunately after the midpoint of the season they fell away and struggled against some of the worst teams in competition. In the mid season of 2019 Brad Scott made the decision to leave NMFC after 10 years at the club taking them to the finals on multiple occasions.

=== Rhyce Shaw and David Noble ===
Rhyce Shaw took over as caretaker coach in the interim in mid- to late 2019 and was later awarded the position as head coach for the following 2020 season. After a disappointing 2020 season where North won only 3 games and finished second-last, Rhyce Shaw left the club in late October 2020 due to personal issues, bringing his short tenure as head coach to an end.

In 2021, former Western Bulldogs and Adelaide assistant coach and long-time football administrator David Noble was appointed as the new senior coach on an open-ended staff contract. Noble led the club to the wooden spoon in 2021 despite the team producing some encouraging results towards the end of the season and ending with four wins and a draw from the season. Noble resigned from the position in mid-2022 after pressure resulting from North's poor start to the season.

=== Alastair Clarkson era ===
After David Noble was sacked as senior coach of North Melbourne and caretaker senior coach Leigh Adams took over for the remaining matches of the 2022 season, on 19 August 2022, it was announced that four-time premiership coach Alastair Clarkson would become senior coach of North Melbourne on a five-year contract, starting from the 2023 season. The appointment was described as a "homecoming" for him due to his playing career starting at the club.

In May 2023, just before the start of Round 10, Clarkson announced that he would step away from his role as North Melbourne senior coach indefinitely, citing mental health as a result of the investigation into alleged historical racism during his time at Hawthorn. Assistant coach Brett Ratten, who had been caretaker senior coach at two previous clubs, was announced as Clarkson's caretaker. Clarkson resumed his role as senior coach of North Melbourne in Round 21, 2023 against Melbourne.

Clarkson was removed as coach of the club in September 2026.

== Club symbols and identity ==
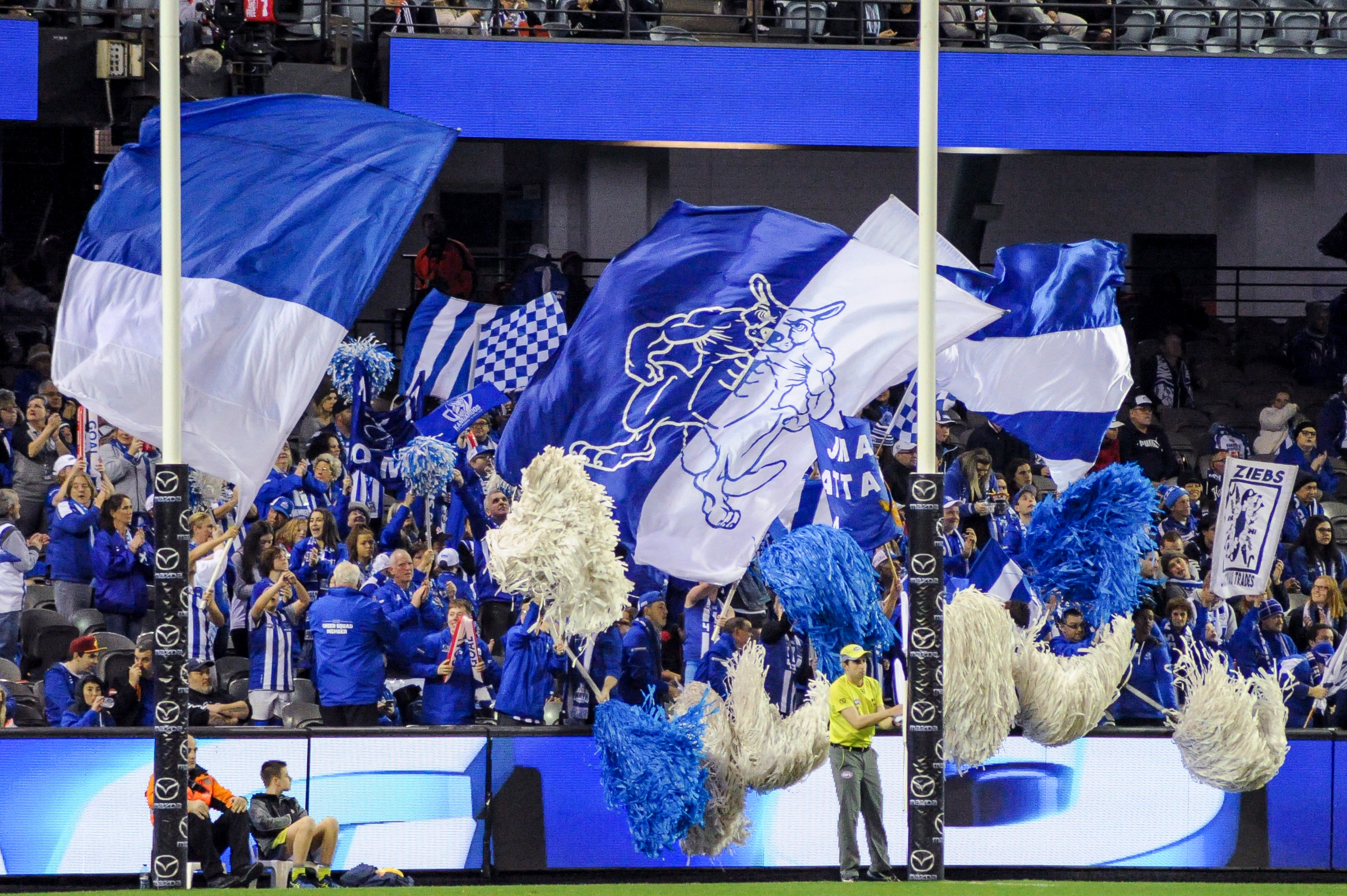
North Melbourne cheer squad in 2017

=== Name and mascot ===
The club was widely known as the "Shinboners" for much of its early history. The origins of the nickname is believed to come from the area's abattoirs, where a number of the players worked. It was Phonse Tobin, North president from 1953 to 1956, who oversaw the club adopting the kangaroo emblem in 1954; Tobin found the image of a shinbone unsavoury and wanted the club to have a mascot it could show with pride. In selecting a new name, he wanted something characteristically Australian and was inspired by a large kangaroo he saw on display outside a city store.

The official name of the club is North Melbourne, but the club has gone under several other aliases over the years. The club was founded as the "North Melbourne Football Club", but changed to "North Melbourne cum Albert Park" after merging with Albert Park in 1876. Following the reformation of the club in 1877, it was known as the "Hotham Football Club" but later took the name "North Melbourne" again in 1888. In 1998 the club proposed changing its name to the "Northern Kangaroos", but it was rejected by the AFL. From 1999 to 2007, the club traded without much success as "The Kangaroos" in a bid to increase its appeal nationally; this decision was reversed at the end of 2007 when the club again reverted to the name "North Melbourne".

The club mascots are Kanga and Ruby. Ruby was introduced in 22 April 2018 in their match vs Hawthorn, and was named as Ruby in 3 May 2018.

=== Club song ===
"Join in the Chorus" is the official anthem of the North Melbourne Football Club. It is sung to the tune of a Scottish folk song from around 1911, "A Wee Deoch an Doris".

The song is generally sung, in accordance to common football tradition, after a victory. It is also played before every match.

"Join in the Chorus" is believed to be the oldest club anthem of any AFL club and has been associated with North from its early VFA days. The preamble of the song originates from a score of a theatre musical called Australia: Heart to Heart and Hand to Hand, written by Toso Taylor in the 1890s in pre-federation Australia. The second verse is unknown in origin and was presumably added later by members of the club when the song was chosen. The chorus was appropriated from a song written and performed by Scottish musician Harry Lauder. The recording currently used by the club was performed by the Fable Singers in April 1972 and only includes the choruses.

The song has a strong Victorian heritage and has been traditionally sung by the Victorian State Football and Victorian Cricket teams respectively. The lyrics have occasionally been changed, including updating the year in the song (e.g. "North Melbourne will be premiers in 1993"), or to remove the words "North Melbourne" during the period when the club was competing only as the Kangaroos. Following 1993, the players would sing after a win, the last line as "North Melbourne will be premiers just you wait and see." instead of "..is the team that plays to win for you and me."

For the 2015 premiership season, You Am I's lead singer, Tim Rogers, a North Melbourne supporter, announced that he would assist in an updated version of the song including the two verses. This version was only played at North home games as the team runs onto the ground in early into the season before being replaced.

=== "Shinboner spirit" ===
At clubs with bigger memberships, their supporters only touch their colours, but at North we have the Shinboner spirit. North people can touch that spirit – they are the real Shinboners, they are the club.

— Ron Joseph

North Melbourne has a history as a working-class, inner-city club. Reflecting the suburb of North Melbourne's lower socio-economic status in the 19th and early 20th century, the team has always been one of the smaller and less wealthy clubs, relying on the mateship and grit of its players and membership to succeed.

'Shinboner spirit' refers to North's reputation of fighting against the odds and not asking for hand-outs. North's fans like to compare this to the (generally richer) clubs like Essendon and Carlton, which through their wealthier patronage and corresponding improved player catchments and ability to pay players more, were generally more successful in the pre–salary cap era. The term persists to the modern day despite North Melbourne having switched its official nickname from the Shinboners to the Kangaroos in the 1950s.

Because it relates to the club's original nickname, Shinboner spirit is often associated with the complete history of the club. In 2005, to celebrate the club's 80th anniversary of senior competition in the VFL and the 30th anniversary of its first VFL premiership, the Kangaroos held a "Shinboner Spirit" gala event attended by almost the entire surviving players. In the awards ceremony, the key Shinboners of the past 80 years were acknowledged, and Glenn Archer was named the "Shinboner of the Century".

=== Guernsey ===
The North Melbourne Football Club has a long history of wearing various designs in the colours of royal blue and white.

Most of the club's earliest jumpers were long-sleeved and not the sleeveless design common today. In their early years the club sported a hooped design when they took to the field. This changed at the behest of the VFA in 1884 who insisted that Hotham change their jumpers to vertical stripes to provide a visible contrast between Hotham and Geelong.

After 1884 the vertical top was worn more often, usually in the lace-up design in the gallery below.

After the merger with West Melbourne, North used a composite jumper that incorporated West Melbourne's red sash for the 1908 season. The merger was in reality, a takeover. The red sash was a token gesture and was removed the following season.

In the early 1920s North experimented with an NMFC monogram design, following League clubs like Carlton and South Melbourne.

Upon promotion to the VFL in 1925, North Melbourne was forced to abandon its royal blue and white striped jumper as it was deemed the jumper design clashed with other clubs. During this period a jumper with a V design was used for several years, before the club returned to using its striped jumper combination of royal blue and white which has been used continuously since 1932.

For 86 seasons, until 2016, the blue stripes were centred, the guernsey had a blue collar and cuffs, and black numbers. Until the 1970s, the numbers were attached to a white panel, while since this point, the top half of the back of the guernsey has been made white to accommodate larger numbers.

Between 2011 and 2016, North Melbourne wore an inverted version of their guernsey, which was predominantly blue with white numbers, as an alternate uniform. In 2017, this was made the club's home jumper and the traditional version was reserved for clashes. However, this was reversed when the club signed a sponsorship deal with German sporting brand Puma, effective from the 2022 season. This saw a return of the traditional guernsey, as well as hooped socks, unused as part of the home uniform since the 1960s. The black player numbers would return in 2023.

In the 1990s, many AFL clubs began to produce alternate uniforms, known in Australian football as 'clash' guernseys. At Arden Street, this meant the introduction of the 'Bounding Roo'. Coinciding with a change in marketing by which the club sought to identify more with the Kangaroos image, this design included a blue chest with thin stripes extending downwards, onto a large kangaroo. The kangaroo was taken from the club's logo, in which it is represented bounding rightward. The guernsey is thus known as the 'Bounding Roo'. Given its association with the club's golden era in the late 1990s, the guernsey is popular among NMFC supporters today. It was used in 2016 to celebrate 20 years since the club's third premiership, and in 2019, North's 150th anniversary.

=== Uniform evolution ===
Changes in the North Melbourne uniform through the years:

Initial years & VFA:

| 1874–85 | 1886–1907 | 1908 | 1909 | 1910,12,14,15 | 1911,13,18,21 | 1922–24 |

VFL/AFL:

| 1925–1932 | 1933–1970 | 1971–1974 | 1974–2015 | 2016–2021 | 2022– |

Significant alternate uniforms:

1995–2002, 2016, 2019

=== Logo ===
North Melbourne has experienced 7 logo changes since its introduction, with 5 of them featuring a bounding kangaroo behind a shield of blue and white stripes. In 2016, North Melbourne introduced a new logo that featured a much fiercer-looking kangaroo—with its head only—sitting on top of the words 'North Melbourne' inside a shield. The change was generally welcomed. The new kangaroo looks slightly to the right, indicating that it is looking into the future.

== Home ground ==
Arden Street Oval was home to the Kangaroos between 1882 and 1985. The oval is currently owned by the City of Melbourne and leased by the North Melbourne Football Club for social, administration and training facilities, and is the site of the club's AFL Women's, VFL and VFL Women's home matches. The grandstands were removed following the conclusion of VFL/AFL matches.

The club has been a home tenant club at Docklands Stadium since the stadium's opening in 2000, and have also played several home games per season in non-Victorian stadiums. In 2012, the Kangaroos commenced playing a maximum of four home games per season at Bellerive Oval in Hobart. The arrangement, which was made in partnership with the Tasmanian Government and the AFL, concluded in 2025. From 2025 to at least 2028, the club will play two home games per season in Western Australia, splitting these games between Optus Stadium and Hands Oval in Bunbury.

=== Current home grounds ===
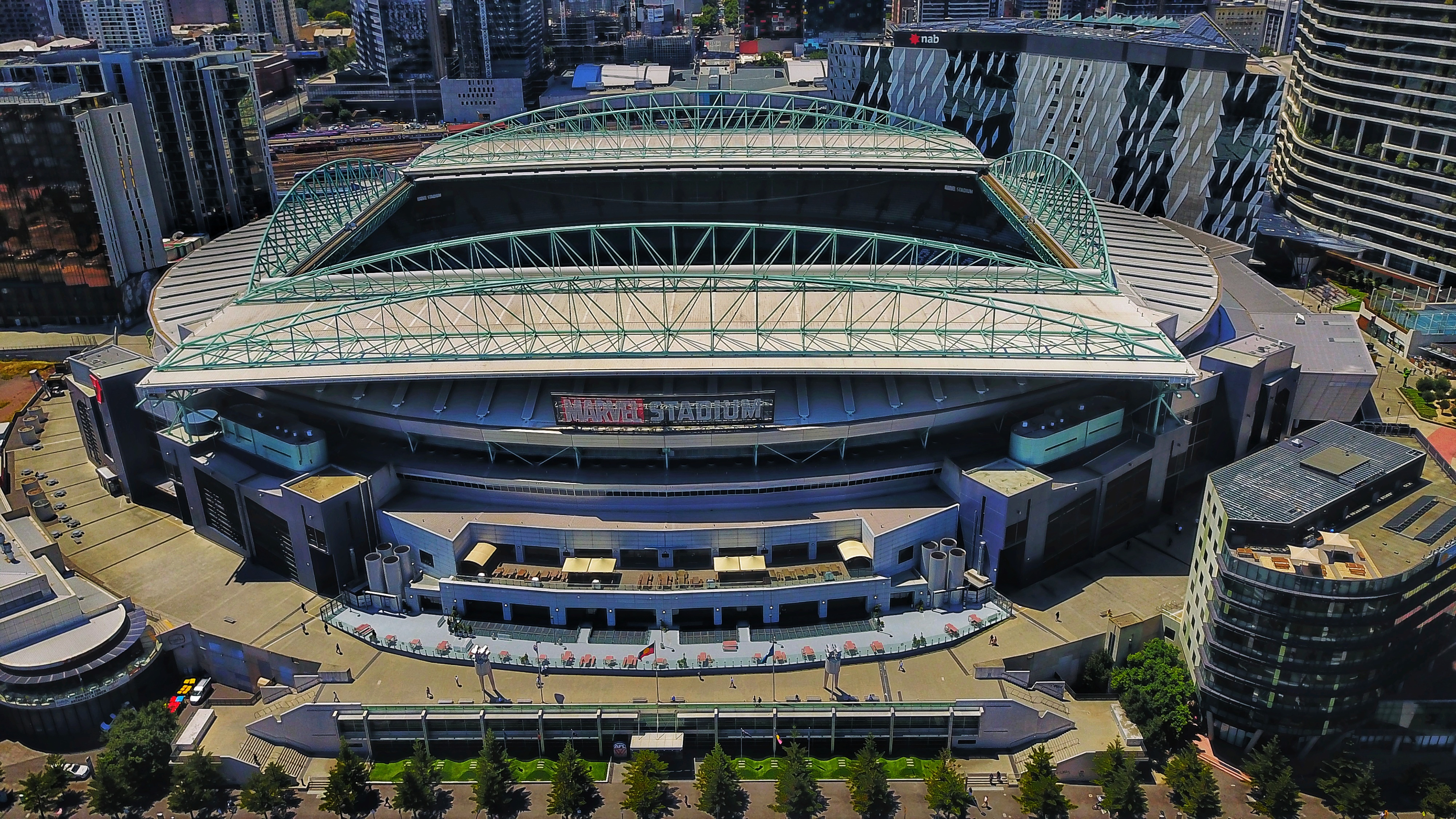
Docklands Stadium (Marvel Stadium) – North Melbourne's home ground

- Docklands Stadium (Marvel Stadium), Docklands, Melbourne
- Hands Oval (JE Hands Memorial Park), South Bunbury, Bunbury
- Perth Stadium (Optus Stadium), Burswood, Perth

| Homegrounds | Years |
|---|---|
| Royal Park | 1869–1875 |
| Albert Park | 1876 |
| Royal Park | 1877–1882 |
| Arden Street Oval | 1882–1964 |
| Coburg City Oval | 1965 |
| Arden Street Oval | 1966–1985 |
| Melbourne Cricket Ground | 1985–2005 |
| Manuka Oval | 1998, 2001–2006 |
| Sydney Cricket Ground | 1999–2002 |
| Docklands Stadium | 2002–present |
| Carrara Stadium | 2007–2008 |
| Ninja Stadium | 2012–2025 |
| Hands Oval | 2025–present |
| Optus Stadium | 2025–present |

== Corporate ==
=== Ownership ===
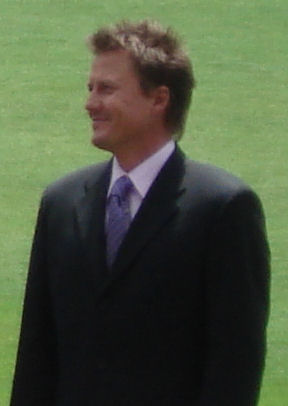
James Brayshaw was club chairman from 2007 to 2017

`The North Melbourne Football Club is a non-profit organisation limited by guarantee. Members of the club serve as the guarantees of capital and have full voting rights at AGMs to elect directors to the club's board.

The club's board of directors has nine members, with each director serving a three-year term before their position is put up for re-election at an AGM. Only one-third of the board is contested at each AGM due to the rolling structure of the terms of the directors. This structure safeguards the entire board from being ousted at a single AGM and has made North Melbourne immune to a lot of the in-house fighting witnessed at other AFL football clubs. The board governs the club as well as selecting a chairman to head the club through a majority vote of directors.

North Melbourne is unique in its structure, because from 1986 to 2006 the club was privately owned and limited by shares. The club was floated in 1986 through a membership vote led by then chairman Bob Ansett. At the meeting, members were encouraged to buy into the club by purchasing shares. The float ended up raising over $3 million and helped to keep the club solvent through the next decade.

In 1991, the John Elliott-led Carlton Football Club attempted a hostile take over North Melbourne by purchasing a large parcel of shares formerly owned by Bob Ansett. The Blues acquired 20 per cent of the capital but that stake was eventually bought back in 2001 by John Magowan, the former head of Merrill Lynch Australia. The resulting melodrama saw the formation of B-Class shareholders who had the effective power of veto over any attempt to merge or relocate the club.

Further takeover attempts were made in the first decade of the 21st century by the Southport Sharks. Then chairman Allan Aylett knocked back a proposal from the Sharks that would have seen them gain a majority stake in the club in exchange for an injection of capital. In early 2006, another proposal from Sharks to underwrite the Kangaroos' games on the Gold Coast, in exchange for a slice of the shareholder structure at the club was knocked back after AFL intervention.

Due to an Australian Taxation Office ruling in 2006, the club proposed a shareholder restructure that would have seen the B Class shareholders power reduced significantly and some voting rights returned to members. This was done to avoid extraordinary taxes being placed on the club, but the move was blocked in December by Bob Ansett and his proxies who feared that the restructure would make the club vulnerable to further takeover bids.

On 28 February 2007, another meeting was called to resolve the shareholder issue. A motion was passed that would return see some voting rights return to members and stop any future tax increments.

In April 2007 it was revealed the AFL was attempting to buy out the shareholders of the club in a bid to gain full ownership, and force a relocation of the club to the Gold Coast.

During October 2007, a group called We Are North Melbourne (WANM) emerged and launched a public campaign, calling for ordinary members to be given the final say on the relocation issue. While the group became synonymous with the push to keep the club in Melbourne, its first priority was to see the club's shareholder structure wound-up and control returned to ordinary members.

North Melbourne reverted to public company in November 2008. A moratorium was passed at an extraordinary general meeting that allowed James Brayshaw's board to serve unopposed until 2010, so as to allow his ticket the maximum time to enact their policies to make the North Melbourne Football Club financially viable.

On 20 November 2016, former Aussie Rules footballer and Football Federation Australia chairman Ben Buckley replaced James Brayshaw as the new chairman of the club.

In 2022, North Melbourne appointed Jen Watt as its CEO, joining president Sonja Hood in the first all-female AFL leadership team.

Previously a club with issues about financial sustainability, North became debt free in 2021 and through to 2023 has posted multiple consecutive surpluses. In 2022, North established the Arden Fund to boost the club's long-term financial sustainability.

=== Sponsorship ===
Guernsey details
| Season | Manufacturer | Guernsey sponsor(s) | Short sponsor |
|---|---|---|---|
| 1975–1978 | — | Courage | — |
| 1979–1984 | — | Budget | — |
| 1985–1992 | — | Qantas | — |
| 1993–1995 | — | NZI Insurance | — |
| 1996 | Nike | Hypertec PCs | NZI Insurance |
| 1997 | Nike | Hewlett-Packard | SmokeFree |
| 1998 | Nike | Hewlett-Packard | SmokeFree |
| 1999 | Nike | Mazda, SmokeFree | Wentworth |
| 2000 | Nike | Mazda, SmokeFree | Wentworth |
| 2001 | Russell Athletic | Mazda, SmokeFree | iPrimus |
| 2002 | Russell Athletic | Mazda | iPrimus |
| 2003 | Russell Athletic | Mazda | iPrimus |
| 2004 | Bont | Mazda, iPrimus | iPrimus |
| 2005 | Bont | Mazda, iPrimus | iPrimus |
| 2006 | Reebok | Mazda, iPrimus | iPrimus |
| 2007 | Reebok | Mazda, iPrimus | iPrimus |
| 2008 | Reebok | Mazda, Vodafone | Blackwoods |
| 2009 | XBlades | Mazda | Blackwoods |
| 2010 | XBlades | Mazda | Blackwoods |
| 2011 | XBlades | Mazda | Blackwoods |
| 2012 | XBlades | Mazda | Blackwoods |
| 2013 | XBlades | Mazda | Blackwoods |
| 2014 | XBlades | Mazda | Blackwoods |
| 2015 | Canterbury | Mazda | Blackwoods |
| 2016 | Canterbury | Mazda | Anytime Fitness |
| 2017 | Canterbury | Mazda | Hello Solar |
| 2018 | Canterbury | Mazda | Hello Solar |
| 2019 | Canterbury | Mazda | Hello Solar |
| 2020 | Canterbury | Mazda | Hello Solar |
| 2021 | Canterbury | Mazda | Hello Solar |
| 2022 | Puma | Mazda | Hello Solar |
| 2023 | Puma | Mazda | Hello Solar |
| 2024 | Puma | Mazda |
| 2025 | Puma | Mazda | Intrepid Travel |
| 2026 | Kookaburra | Mazda | 13cabs |

=== Membership base ===
| Season | Members | Change from previous season | Finishing position | Average Attendance | Total Attendance |
|---|---|---|---|---|---|
| 1984 | 6,374 | — | 11th | 17,675 | 388,856 |
| 1985 | 6,520 | ▲146 (+2.29%) | 4th | 24,042 | 577,019 |
| 1986 | 5,318 | ▼1202 (−18.44%) | 7th | 21,592 | 475,032 |
| 1987 | 3,430 | ▼1888 (−35.50%) | 5th | 21,108 | 485,491 |
| 1988 | 4,415 | ▲985 (+28.72%) | 11th | 15,662 | 344,558 |
| 1989 | 3,411 | ▼1004 (−22.74%) | 9th | 17,759 | 390,693 |
| 1990 | 5,201 | ▲1790 (+52.48%) | 6th | 19,526 | 429,565 |
| 1991 | 6,683 | ▲1482 (+28.49%) | 8th | 20,574 | 452,617 |
| 1992 | 6,083 | ▼600 (−8.98%) | 12th | 19,652 | 432,350 |
| 1993 | 6,851 | ▲768 (+12.63%) | 5th | 27,213 | 571,481 |
| 1994 | 10,296 | ▲3445 (+50.28%) | 3rd | 33,177 | 796,254 |
| 1995 | 14,027 | ▲3731 (+36.24%) | 3rd | 35,379 | 884,477 |
| 1996 | 14,438 | ▲411 (+2.93%) | 2nd | 37,827 | 945,678 |
| 1997 | 19,368 | ▲4930 (+34.15%) | 4th | 36,873 | 921,829 |
| 1998 | 20,196 | ▲828 (+4.26%) | 1^{st} | 38,336 | 958,394 |
| 1999 | 22,080 | ▲1884 (+9.33%) | 2nd | 34,814 | 870,349 |
| 2000 | 22,156 | ▲76 (+0.34%) | 4th | 33,471 | 836,765 |
| 2001 | 21,409 | ▼747 (−3.37%) | 13th | 30,209 | 664,601 |
| 2002 | 20,831 | ▼578 (−2.70%) | 7th | 26,879 | 618,211 |
| 2003 | 21,403 | ▲572 (+2.76%) | 10th | 29,812 | 655,854 |
| 2004 | 23,420 | ▲2017 (+9.42%) | 10th | 28,300 | 622,580 |
| 2005 | 24,154 | ▲734 (+3.13%) | 7th | 31,511 | 724,757 |
| 2006 | 24,700 | ▲546 (+2.26%) | 14th | 28,849 | 634,686 |
| 2007 | 22,372 | ▼2328 (−9.43%) | 3rd | 33,458 | 836,445 |
| 2008 | 34,342 | ▲11970 (+53.50%) | 8th | 29,569 | 680,095 |
| 2009 | 30,613 | ▼3729 (−10.86%) | 13th | 27,028 | 594,606 |
| 2010 | 29,272 | ▼1341 (−4.38%) | 9th | 27,435 | 603,586 |
| 2011 | 30,362 | ▲1090 (+3.97%) | 9th | 25,734 | 617,625 |
| 2012 | 33,754 | ▲3392 (+11.17%) | 8th | 24,666 | 567,323 |
| 2013 | 35,246 | ▲1492 (+2.53%) | 10th | 28,683 | 631,035 |
| 2014 | 40,092 | ▲4846 (+13.74%) | 6th | 28,060 | 617,316 |
| 2015 | 41,418 | ▲1326 (+3.3%) | 8th | 25,674 | 608,974 |
| 2016 | 45,014 | ▲3596 | 8th | 28,171 | 720,874 |
| 2017 | 40,343 | ▼4671 (10.38%) | 15th | 25,196 | 554,306 |
| 2018 | 40,789 | ▲446 (1.10%) | 9th | 25,896 | 569,722 |
| 2019 | 42,419 | ▲1630 (3.84%) | 12th | 27,429 | 603,438 |
| 2020 | 38,667 | ▼3752 (-8.8%) | 17th | 2,133 | 27,731 |
| 2021 | 46,357 | ▲7690 (19.88%) | 18th | 14,339 | 24,3757 |
| 2022 | 50,191 | ▲3834 (8.27%) | 18th | 21,187 | 466,103 |
| 2023 | 51,084 | ▲893 (1.77%) | 17th | 25,160 | 578,674 |
| 2024 | 50,628 | ▼456 (0.89%) | 17th | 24,271 | 558,230 |

- Note: membership reference

=== Night football ===
In Round 1,1985, North Melbourne pioneered the concept of playing football on Friday nights. Since then, North Melbourne has played the most Friday night games of any AFL club.

Friday night matches later became the most lucrative timeslot for televised games, and North Melbourne's relatively low supporter base resulted in fewer Friday night matches. Between 2010 and 2014, North Melbourne had hosted an annual Friday night match against Carlton in recognition of its pioneering role in the concept.

=== Good Friday football ===
After years of campaigning to play on Good Friday, the AFL announced on 25 October 2016 that North Melbourne would play the Western Bulldogs on Good Friday in 2017. Good Friday in Australia is a day when people raise money for Melbourne's Royal Children's Hospital and North Melbourne announced that $5 from each ticket sold would go to the charity. The game is known as the Good Friday Superclash. North Melbourne played Essendon on Good Friday on 19 April 2019.

=== Indigenous players ===
North Melbourne has a strong history of supporting and fostering Aboriginal footballers in the VFL and AFL. The first indigenous footballer to play for the club was Percy Johnson in the 1950s, and was followed by other fan favourites such as Bertie Johnson, Barry Cable and the Krakouer brothers in the following decades.

The following is a list of Indigenous footballers to have played senior football at the club:

- Chris Gomez † (1925)
- Alf Egan † (1934–35)
- Percy Johnson (1951–1955)
- Bert Johnson (1965–1968)
- Alan Bloomfield (1970–71)
- Barry Cable (1970, 1974–1977)
- Craig Holden † (1982–1983)
- Jim Krakouer (1982–1989)
- Phil Krakouer (1982–1989)
- Derek Kickett (1989)
- Andrew L. Krakouer (1989–1990)
- Adrian McAdam (1993–1995)
- Warren Campbell (1994–1995)
- Winston Abraham (1998–2001)
- Byron Pickett (1997–2002)
- Gary Dhurrkay (1999–2000)
- Shannon Motlop (1999–2003)
- Daniel Motlop (2001–2005)
- Daniel Wells (2003–2016)
- Eddie Sansbury (2004–2008)
- Djaran Whyman (2007)
- Matt Campbell (2007–2012)
- Lindsay Thomas (2007–2017)
- Cruize Garlett (2009–2012)
- Jed Anderson (2016–2022)
- Jy Simpkin (2017–present)
- Paul Ahern (2018–2020)
- Tarryn Thomas (2019–2023)
- Kyron Hayden (2019–2022)
- Phoenix Spicer (2021–2023)
- Jason Horne-Francis (2022)
- Robert Hansen Jr. (2023)

†: Aboriginality uncertain

=== Killed in action ===
The following footballers were killed in action during the World Wars and played senior football for North Melbourne.

==== World War I ====
- Peter Martin

==== World War II ====
- George Brock
- Alf Goonan
- Len Johnson
- Mo Shapir
- Len Thomas
- Beres Reilly
- Bert Peters

== Rivalries ==
=== Essendon ===
One of the fiercest rivalries in the AFL can be traced back to 1896, when several clubs, including Essendon Football Club, broke away from the Victorian Football Association to form the Victorian Football League. North sought to join the breakaway competition, but some argue this desire was not realised due to Essendon feeling threatened by North's proximity and the fact their inclusion could drain Essendon of vital talent. More than 100 years later, some North supporters have not forgiven Essendon for the decision and have blamed the Bombers for their relatively small supporter base and gate revenue. North were finally admitted into the VFL in 1925 alongside Footscray and Hawthorn. In 1950, the two sides met in their first and only grand final meeting to date, which Essendon won by 38 points. The rivalry would flare up again in the 1980s. In 1982, the Krakouer brothers, Jim and Phil, led the Kangaroos to an Elimination Final win. Essendon had their revenge a year later, winning a Preliminary Final by 86 points. The rivalry was re-ignited in the late 1990s and early 2000s due to the on-field success of the two sides. In preparation for the 1998 finals series, and despite losing six of their last eight to the Kangaroos, legendary Essendon coach Kevin Sheedy publicly labelled North executives Greg Miller and Mark Dawson soft in response to comments from commentators that his Essendon team was soft. The Kangaroos beat Essendon in the much-hyped encounter that followed (a Qualifying Final), and North fans pelted Sheedy with marshmallows as he left the ground, although Sheedy was seemingly unfazed by the incident, encouraging a "Marshmallow Game" the next year and relishing in the fact that Sheedy's ulterior motive was to build up the game and draw a large crowd, which proved to be correct, drawing in 71,154 people to attend the game. In 2000, the Bombers thrashed North by 125 points. The biggest VFL/AFL comeback of all time occurred between the two teams when Essendon managed to come back from a 69-point deficit to win by 12 points in 2001. A meeting of the two rivals at the MCG in the 2014 AFL finals series in the 2nd Elimination Final resulted in North winning by 12 points, eliminating Essendon from the finals series and extending their drought of years without a finals win.

The rivalry has at times been described as one-sided; in 2020, Essendon player Devon Smith remarked "It's a bit of a rivalry built up from them, but for us it's another game" given Essendon Football club considers its main rivals to be Carlton, Collingwood and Hawthorn.

=== Hawthorn ===
North and Hawthorn have a rivalry that dates back to the 1950s when the two teams competed for the McCaskill Trophy in a series of tough and torrid encounters from 1952 to 1956, the trophy being named after Bob McCaskill who had coached both North and Hawthorn. The rivalry intensified in the 1970s when, after being generally unsuccessful in the first few decades since their entry into the VFL, both clubs became dominant and played against each other in three grand finals in four years. North Melbourne defeated Hawthorn in the 1975 VFL Grand Final by 55 points to win their maiden premiership. However, Hawthorn defeated North Melbourne in the 1976 grand final by 30 points and the 1978 grand final by 18 points. From 1974 to 1978 they played together in 10 finals and the 1976 NFL Night Series final in Adelaide. During the 1980s, Hawthorn dominated North but during the '90s the results were reversed, including a qualifying final which became the first ever AFL finals match to require extra time, after the scores were level with North Melbourne 12.19 (91) to Hawthorn 13.13 (91) at the end of regular time. North Melbourne dominated extra time, kicking 3.5 to Hawthorn's nil and won by 23 points. The rivalry reignited in the 21st century, firstly with an intense semi-final in 2007. Played in front of a crowd of nearly 75,000, the game was noted not only for its physical intensity, but also the flair and attacking ability of both teams' young playing groups, including a high-flying mark by North forward Aaron Edwards. In 2014 a choking incident involved Brian Lake and North Melbourne forward Drew Petrie, when Lake had Petrie in a choking hold during a match at Docklands Stadium. In 2015 there were several off the ball incidents and fights, including an all-in melee during the first term of their round 5 clash.

== Club honour board ==
=== Honour roll ===
| Year | W: L: D | Position | Chairman | CEO | Coach | Captain | Vice-Captain | Best and Fairest | Leading Goalkicker |
|---|---|---|---|---|---|---|---|---|---|
| 2000 | 15:10:0 | 4th | R. P. Casey/A. Carter | G. Miller | D. Pagan | W. Carey | A. Stevens | P. Bell | W. Carey 69 |
| 2001 | 9:13:0 | 13th | A. Carter/A. Aylett | G. Miller/M. Easy | D. Pagan | W. Carey | A. Stevens | S. Grant | S. Rocca 48 |
| 2002 | 12:11:0 | 7th | A. Aylett | M. Easy/G. Walsh | D. Pagan | A. Stevens | G. Archer | A. Simpson | S. Rocca 50 |
| 2003 | 11:10:1 | 10th | A. Aylett | G. Walsh | D. Laidley | A. Stevens | G. Archer | B. Harvey | L. Harding 33 |
| 2004 | 10:12:0 | 10th | A. Aylett | G. Walsh | D. Laidley | A. Simpson | B. Harvey | B. Rawlings | S. Rocca 49 |
| 2005 | 13:10:0 | 7th | A. Aylett/G. Duff | G. Walsh | D. Laidley | A. Simpson | B. Harvey | B. Harvey | N. Thompson 52 |
| 2006 | 7:15:0 | 14th | G. Duff | G. Walsh/R. Aylett | D. Laidley | A. Simpson | B. Harvey | B. Rawlings | N. Thompson 54 |
| 2007 | 15:10:0 | 3rd | G. Duff/J. Magowan/J. Brayshaw | R. Aylett | D. Laidley | A. Simpson | B. Harvey | B. Harvey | C. Jones 43 |
| 2008 | 12:10:1 | 7th | J. Brayshaw | E. Arocca | D. Laidley | A. Simpson | B. Harvey | B. Harvey | D. Hale 37 |
| 2009 | 7:14:1 | 13th | J. Brayshaw | E. Arocca | D. Laidley/D. Crocker | B. Harvey | D. Petrie | A. Swallow | D. Petrie 27 |
| 2010 | 11:11:0 | 9th | J. Brayshaw | E. Arocca | B. Scott | B. Harvey | D. Petrie | B. Harvey, B. Rawlings | L. Thomas 29 |
| 2011 | 10:12:0 | 9th | J. Brayshaw | E. Arocca | B. Scott | B. Harvey | D. Petrie | A. Swallow, D. Wells | D. Petrie 48 |
| 2012 | 14:8:0 | 8th | J. Brayshaw | E. Arocca/C. Vale | B. Scott | A. Swallow | D. Petrie, J. Ziebell | A. Swallow | D. Petrie 57 |
| 2013 | 10:12:0 | 10th | J. Brayshaw | C. Dilena | B. Scott | A. Swallow | D. Petrie, J. Ziebell | D. Wells, S. Thompson | L. Thomas 53 |
| 2014 | 14:8:0 | 4th | J. Brayshaw | C. Dilena | B. Scott | A. Swallow | D. Petrie, J. Ziebell | B. Cunnington | D. Petrie 50 |
| 2015 | 13:9:0 | 4th | J. Brayshaw | C. Dilena | B. Scott | A. Swallow | D. Petrie, J. Ziebell | T. Goldstein | D. Petrie & J. Waite 42 |
| 2016 | 12:10:0 | 8th | J. Brayshaw | C. Dilena | B. Scott | A. Swallow | | R. Tarrant | B. Brown 41 |
| 2017 | 6:16:0 | 15th | B. Buckley | C. Dilena | B. Scott | J. Ziebell | R. Tarrant, S. Higgins, J. Macmillan, A. Swallow | S. Higgins | B. Brown 63 |
| 2018 | 12:10:0 | 9th | B. Buckley | C. Dilena | B. Scott | J. Ziebell | R. Tarrant, S. Higgins, J. Macmillan | S. Higgins | B. Brown 61 |
| 2019 | 10:12:0 | 12th | B. Buckley | C. Dilena | B.Scott/R. Shaw | J. Ziebell | R. Tarrant, S. Higgins, J. Macmillan | B. Cunnington | B. Brown 63 |
| 2020 | 3:17:0 | 17th | B. Buckley | B. Amarfio | R. Shaw | J. Ziebell | R. Tarrant, S. Higgins | L. McDonald | C. Zurhaar 18 |
| 2021 | 4:17:1 | 18th | B. Buckley | B. Amarfio | D. Noble | J. Ziebell | L. McDonald, J.Simpkin | J. Simpkin | N. Larkey 42 |
| 2022 | 2:20:0 | 18th | B. Buckley | B. Amarfio | D. Noble/L. Adams | J. Ziebell | L. McDonald, J.Simpkin | J. Simpkin | N. Larkey 38 |
| 2023 | 3:20:0 | 17th | S. Hood | J. Watt | A. Clarkson/B. Ratten | L. McDonald, J. Simpkin | N. Larkey | H. Sheezel | N. Larkey 71 |
| 2024 | 3:20:0 | 17th | S. Hood | J. Watt | A. Clarkson | L. McDonald, J. Simpkin | N. Larkey | L. Davies-Uniacke | N. Larkey 46 |

- note: Season Summary reference
- note: Goal kicker reference

=== North Melbourne Team of the Century ===
At a special function in August 2001, the North Melbourne Team of the Century was announced. There was no minimum number of games set for selection. Wayne Carey was named as captain and Denis Pagan as coach. The selection panel was Geoff Poulter (journalist), Father Gerard Dowling (club historian), Keith McKenzie (former coach), Lloyd Holyoak (former president), Max Ritchie (former player and chairman of selectors) and Greg Miller (chief executive).

North Melbourne Team of the Century
| B: | Glenn Archer | David Dench | Mick Martyn |
| HB: | John Rantall | Ross Glendinning | Ted Jarrard |
| C: | Keith Greig | Les Foote | Laurie Dwyer |
| HF: | Malcolm Blight | Wayne Carey (c) | Wayne Schimmelbusch |
| F: | John Dugdale | Jock Spencer | Allen Aylett |
| Foll: | Noel Teasdale | Anthony Stevens | Barry Cable |
| Int: | Brent Crosswell | Barry Davis | Peter Steward |
| Int: | Sam Kekovich | Jim Krakouer | Brent Harvey |
| Coach: | Denis Pagan | | |
| Emg: | David King | John Blakey | Wayne Schwass |
| Emg: | Gary Dempsey | | |

=== Shinboner of the Century ===
On 18 March 2005, the North Melbourne football club held a special gala dinner entitled the "North Story" to celebrate the 80th anniversary of North's admission to the VFL, and the 30th anniversary of the club's first VFL premiership. Over 3500 people attended the historic event held at the Royal Exhibition Building, including almost all surviving North Melbourne players. Glenn Archer was voted the Shinboner of the Century by his peers as the player who most represents the 'Shinboner Spirit'. The following players were voted 'Shinboners' of their era:

- Les Foote – Shinboner of the early era (1925–1950)
- Allen Aylett – Shinboner of the '50s
- Noel Teasdale – Shinboner of the '60s
- Malcolm Blight – Shinboner of the '70s
- Wayne Schimmelbusch – Shinboner of the '80s
- Wayne Carey – Shinboner of the modern era (1990–2005)

=== 150th-year celebration ===
To commemorate the 150th year of the founding of the North Melbourne Football Club, a 150th Year Celebration was organised for the first weekend of August 2019, which commenced with a Friday Night blockbuster against archrivals Hawthorn. Starting from 27 points down in the first quarter, the Kangaroos fought back against the Hawks to triumph as 22-point winners to get the weekend celebrations underway. The following day, the Kangaroos' VFL side took on Box Hill and won in a similar comeback performance, coming from 31 points down at three-quarter time to win by 2 points. To cap off the weekend, a 150th-Year Celebration Dinner was held at the Melbourne Convention & Exhibition Centre, where the 150 greatest-ever North Melbourne players were announced, with the top-10 greatest North Melbourne players announced on the night from the results of an expert panel.

Top 10 Greatest North Players

- 1 – Wayne Carey
- 2 – Keith Greig
- 3 – David Dench
- 4 – Allen Aylett
- 5 – Brent Harvey
- 6 – Malcolm Blight
- 7 – Wayne Schimmelbusch
- 8 – Les Foote
- 9 – Anthony Stevens
- 10 – Ross Glendinning

=== Club achievements ===
Premierships
| Competition | Level | Wins | Years won |
| Australian Football League | Men's seniors | 4 | 1975, 1977, 1996, 1999 |
| Australian Football League | Men's reserves (1919–1999) | 7 | 1947, 1957, 1967, 1978, 1979, 1995, 1996 |
| Australian Football League | Men's under-19s (1946–1991) | 7 | 1946, 1976, 1984, 1987, 1988, 1990, 1991 |
| AFL Women's | Women's seniors | 2 | 2024, 2025 |
| Victorian Football Association | Seniors (1877–1924) | 6 | 1903, 1904, 1910, 1914, 1915, 1918 |
| Victorian Football Association | Second-twenty | 2 | 1886, 1887 |
| VFL Women's | Women's reserves | 3 | 2024, 2025, (Note: Team was known as "North Melbourne Werribee" as a result of an affiliation with Werribee Football Club.) 2026 |
Other titles and honours
| McClelland Trophy | Seniors | 4 | 1976, 1978, 1983, 1998 |
| Championship of Australia | Seniors | 1 | 1975 |
| VFL Night Series | Seniors | 2 | 1965, 1966 |
| AFC Night Series | Seniors | 1 | 1980 |
| AFL pre-season competition | Seniors | 2 | 1995, 1998 |
Finishing positions
| Australian Football League | Minor premiership | 4 | 1949, 1978, 1983, 1998 |
| Australian Football League | Grand Finalist | 5 | 1950, 1974, 1976, 1978, 1998 |
| Australian Football League | Wooden spoons | 15 | 1926, 1929, 1930, 1931, 1934, 1935, 1937, 1940, 1956, 1961, 1968, 1970, 1972, 2021, 2022 |
| AFL Women's | Minor premiership | 3 | 2024, 2025, 2026 |
| AFL Women's | Grand Finalist | 1 | 2023 |
| AFL Women's | Wooden spoons | 0 | Nil |

=== VFL/AFL finishing positions (1925–present) ===
| Finishing Position | Year (Finals in Bold) | Tally |
|---|---|---|
| 1st (Premiers) | **1975**, **1977**, **1996**, **1999** | 4 |
| 2nd (Runner-Up) | **1950**, **1974**, **1976**, **1978**, **1998** | 5 |
| 3rd | **1949**, **1958**, **1979**, **1983**, **1994**, **2007** | 6 |
| 4th | **1945**, **1954**, **1982**, **1985**, **1995**, **1997**, **2000**, **2014**, **2015** | 9 |
| 5th | **1980**, **1987**, **1993** | 3 |
| 6th | 1944, 1959, 1973, 1990 | 4 |
| 7th | 1952, 1953, 1963, 1966, 1986, **2002**, **2005** | 7 |
| 8th | 1932, 1933, 1948, 1957, 1964, 1967, 1969, 1981, 1991, **2008**, **2012**, **2016** | 12 |
| 9th | 1938, 1939, 1941, 1942, 1943, 1946, 1951, 1965, 1971, 1989, 2010, 2011, 2018 | 13 |
| 10th | 1925, 1947, 2003, 2004, 2013 | 5 |
| 11th | 1927, 1928, 1936, 1955, 1960, 1962, 1984, 1988 | 8 |
| 12th | 1926, 1929, 1930, 1931, 1934, 1935, 1937, 1940, 1956, 1961, 1968, 1970, 1972, 1992, 2019 | 15 |
| 13th | 2001, 2009 | 2 |
| 14th | 2006 | 1 |
| 15th | 2017 | 1 |
| 16th | 2025 | 1 |
| 17th | 2020, 2023, 2024 | 3 |
| 18th | 2021, 2022 | 2 |

== Players ==
=== Current squad ===
North Melbourne Football Club · AFL personnel
| Playing list | | Inactive list | Coaching staff |
|---|---|---|---|
| 1 Lachy Dovaston; 2 Finn O'Sullivan; 3 Harry Sheezel (vc); 4 Aidan Corr; 5 Caleb Daniel; 6 George Wardlaw; 9 Luke Davies-Uniacke; 10 Colby McKercher; 11 Luke McDonald; 12 Jy Simpkin; 13 Charlie Spargo; 15 Dylan Stephens; 17 Riley Hardeman; 18 Wil Dawson; 19 Griffin Logue; 20 Nick Larkey (c); 22 Taylor Goad; 23 Blake Thredgold | 24 Tom Powell; 25 Paul Curtis; 26 Luke Parker; 27 Jack Darling; 28 Hugo Mikunda; 30 Charlie Comben; 32 Toby Pink*; 34 Jackson Archer; 35 Matt Whitlock; 36 River Stevens; 38 Tristan Xerri; 39 Tom Blamires*; 41 Jacob Konstanty; 42 Oliver Griffin*; 44 Cameron Zurhaar; 45 Zac Banch*; 47 Cooper Trembath*; Nick Blakey | | Senior coach: Jaymie Graham; Assistant coaches: Jed Adcock (back line); Michael Barlow (midfield); Xavier Clarke (forward line); Damian Monkhorst (ruck); Jarrod Lienert (development); Shaun Hampson (development); Darcy Macpherson (development); Sam Switkowski (development); Legend: (c) captain; (vc) vice-captain; * rookie; Updated: 6 November 2026; Sources: Players, coaches |

== Reserves team ==
North Melbourne

Names
- Full name: North Melbourne Football Club
- Former name: Kangaroos (1999)

2025 season
- Home-and-away season: 15th

Club details
- Founded: 1925, re-established 2018 (as a reserves side)
- Competition: Victorian Football League
- Coach: Tom Lynch
- Captain: Darcy Macpherson
- Premierships: VFL/AFL reserves (7): 1947; 1957; 1967; 1978; 1979; 1995; 1996
- Ground: Arden Street Oval (10,000)
- Training ground: Arden Street

Uniforms
Home

The North Melbourne reserves are the reserves team of the club, playing in the Victorian Football League (VFL).

=== History ===
North Melbourne competed in the VFL/AFL reserves from 1925 until 1999. During that time, the team won seven premierships − 1947, 1957, 1967, 1978, 1979, 1995 and 1996.

Following the demise of the AFL reserves competition, the standalone reserves team was dissolved, and over the following eighteen years the club entered reserves affiliations with a range of VFL clubs.

- 2000–2002: Murray Kangaroos
- 2003–2005: Port Melbourne
- 2006–2007: North Ballarat and Tasmania
- 2008–2015: North Ballarat and Werribee
- 2016–2017: Werribee

In 2018, North Melbourne re-established its own reserves team. The side initially played its home games at Chirnside Park in Werribee until mid-2019, and then at the redeveloped Arden Street Oval since the second half of 2019.

=== Honours ===
Jim 'Frosty' Miller Medal: Nick Larkey (2018)

=== Seasons ===
| Premiers | Grand Finalist | Minor premiers | Finals appearance | Wildcard Round appearance | Wooden spoon | League leading goalkicker | League best and fairest |

| Year | League | Finish | W | L | D | Coach | Captain | Best and fairest | Leading goalkicker | Ref |
|---|---|---|---|---|---|---|---|---|---|---|
| 2018 | VFL | 10th | 8 | 10 | 0 | David Loader | Michael Close | Nick Rippon | Nick Larkey (41) | |
| 2019 | VFL | 13th | 5 | 13 | 0 | David Loader | Brendan Whitecross | Tom Campbell | Lachlan Hosie (20) | |
| 2020 | VFL | (No season) | | | | David Loader | Brendan Whitecross | (No season) | | |
| 2021 | VFL | 15th | 4 | 6 | 0 | Leigh Adams | Flynn Appleby | Harry Jones | Ben Speight (12) | |
| 2022 | VFL | 18th | 4 | 14 | 0 | Leigh Adams | Harry Jones | Dom Tyson | Mat Walker (23) | |
| 2023 | VFL | 10th | 10 | 8 | 0 | Tom Lynch | Jack Watkins | Jack Watkins | Sam Lowson (34) | |
| 2024 | VFL | 15th | 8 | 10 | 0 | Tom Lynch | Jack Watkins | Jack Watkins (2) | Tyler Sellers (30) | |
| 2025 | VFL | 15th | 7 | 10 | 1 | Tom Lynch | Darcy Macpherson | Darcy Macpherson | Finnbar Maley (21) | |

== Women's teams ==
=== AFL Women's team ===
North Melbourne Women's

Names
- Full name: North Melbourne Tasmanian Kangaroos

2025 season
- Home-and-away season: 1st

Club details
- Founded: 2018
- Competition: AFL Women's
- Coach: Darren Crocker
- Captain: Jasmine Garner
- Premierships: AFL Women's (2): 2024; 2025
- Grounds: Arden Street Oval (10,000)
- North Hobart Oval (10,000)
- University of Tasmania Stadium (21,000)
- Training ground: Arden Street

The North Melbourne Women's are the women's team of the club, playing in the AFL Women's competition (AFLW).

In 2017, following the inaugural AFL Women's (AFLW) season, North Melbourne was among eight clubs that applied for licences to enter the competition from 2019 onwards. In September 2017, the club was announced as one of two clubs, along with Geelong, to receive a licence to join the competition in 2019. In April 2018, the club announced the signing of Western Bulldogs midfielder Emma Kearney, who had just won the AFL Women's best and fairest and a premiership and club best-and-fairest with the Bulldogs. The club officially competes as the North Melbourne Tasmanian Kangaroos – often shortened simply to Kangaroos across league publications – due to its ground-sharing arrangement between venues in Victoria and Tasmania.

The team made the grand final in 2023, losing narrowly to Brisbane. In 2024 the club went on a 12-match unbeaten streak, a record for the AFL Women's competition (though this includes a draw against Geelong in round two), which culminated in a 30-point premiership victory against Brisbane. Star midfielder Jasmine Garner was awarded the best-on-ground medal for her 35-possession performance. The club again dominated in the 2025, winning all 12 home-and-away games and all three finals, to record back-to-back premierships and extend their winning run to 27 consecutive matches.

| 2024 AFL Women's Grand Final | G | B | Total |
| North Melbourne | 6 | 3 | 39 |
| Brisbane | 1 | 3 | 9 |
| Venue: Ikon Park | Crowd: 12,122 |

| 2025 AFL Women's Grand Final | G | B | Total |
| North Melbourne | 9 | 2 | 56 |
| Brisbane | 2 | 4 | 16 |
| Venue: Ikon Park | Crowd: 12,741 |

==== AFL Women's squad ====
North Melbourne Football Club · AFL Women's personnel
| Playing list | | Inactive list | Coaching staff |
|---|---|---|---|
| 1 Kristie-Lee Weston-Turner; 2 Libby Birch; 3 Bella Eddey; 4 Eilish Sheerin; 5 Tess Craven; 6 Alice O'Loughlin; 7 Ash Riddell (vc); 8 Taylah Gatt; 9 Emma Kearney; 10 Bláithín Bogue; 11 Eliza Shannon; 12 Nicole Bresnehan; 13 Vikki Wall; 14 Erika O'Shea; 16 Tahlia Randall | 18 Shauna McElligott; 19 Ruby Tripodi; 20 Jasmine Ferguson; 21 Amy Gavin Mangan; 22 Claire Mahony; 23 Mia King; 24 Tessa Boyd; 25 Jasmine Garner (c); 26 Kim Rennie; 28 Abby Favell; 30 Sarah Wall; 33 Kate Shierlaw; 35 Jenna Bruton; 37 Maddison Torpey; 60 Emma King | 15 Amy Smith | Senior coach: Darren Crocker; Assistant coaches: Nick Devereux (senior assistant); Daniel McKenzie (back line); Trent Dumont (midfield); Regan Kerslake (forward line); Legend: (c) captain; (vc) vice-captain; Updated: 6 November 2026; Sources: Players, coaches |

==== AFL Women's season summaries ====
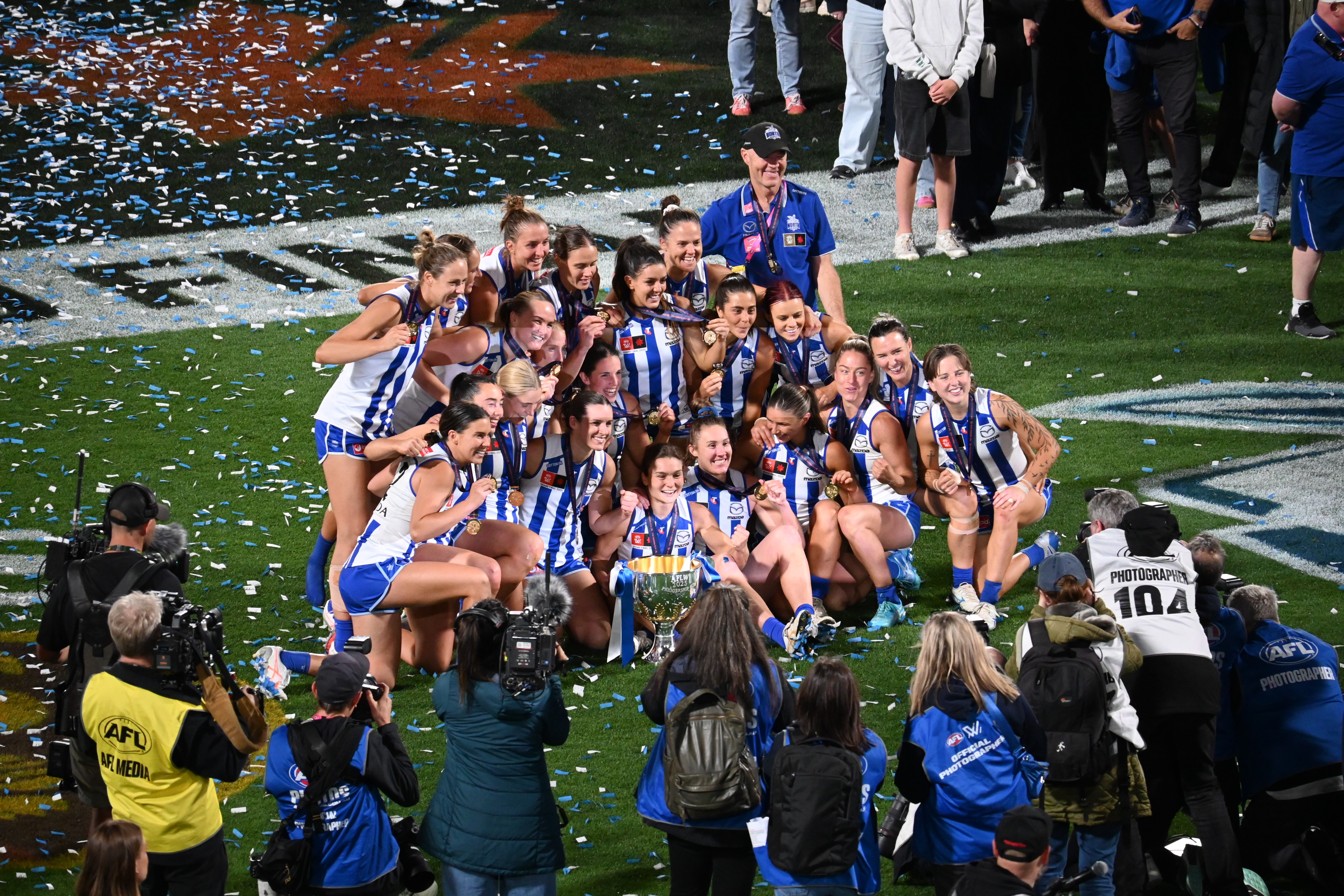
North Melbourne players with the premiership cup following the 2025 AFL Women's Grand Final.

North Melbourne AFLW honour roll
| Season | Ladder | W–L–D | Finals | Coach | Captain(s) | Best and fairest | Leading goalkicker |
|---|---|---|---|---|---|---|---|
| 2019 | 3rd ^ | 5–2–0 | DNQ | Scott Gowans | Emma Kearney | Jenna Bruton | Emma King (8) |
| 2020 | 2nd ^ | 5–1–0 | Semi-finalists | Scott Gowans | Emma Kearney | Jasmine Garner | Kaitlyn Ashmore (9) |
| 2021 | 6th | 6–3–0 | Elimination finalists | Darren Crocker | Emma Kearney | Jasmine Garner (2) | Sophie Abbatangelo & Jasmine Garner (9) |
| 2022 (S6) | 4th | 7–3–0 | Elimination finalists | Darren Crocker | Emma Kearney | Ash Riddell | Jasmine Garner (2) (10) |
| 2022 (S7) | 8th | 6–3–1 | Preliminary finalists | Darren Crocker | Emma Kearney | Jasmine Garner (3) | Tahlia Randall (12) |
| 2023 | 3rd | 7–3–0 | Runners-up | Darren Crocker | Emma Kearney | Jasmine Garner (4) | Tahlia Randall (2) (21) |
| 2024 | 1st | 10–0–1 | Premiers | Darren Crocker | Emma Kearney | Jasmine Garner (5) | Alice O'Loughlin (19) |
| 2025 | 1st | 12–0–0 | Premiers | Darren Crocker | Jasmine Garner | Ash Riddell (2) | Blaithin Bogue (25) |

^ Denotes the ladder was split into two conferences. Figure refers to the club's overall finishing position in the home-and-away season.

=== VFL Women's team ===
North Melbourne began fielding a team in the second-tier VFL Women's league in 2021, following several years of affiliation with Melbourne University in the competition.

Under coach Brett Gourley, the club won the 2024 premiership, defeating the Western Bulldogs in the Grand Final played at Port Melbourne's ETU Stadium in July 2024.

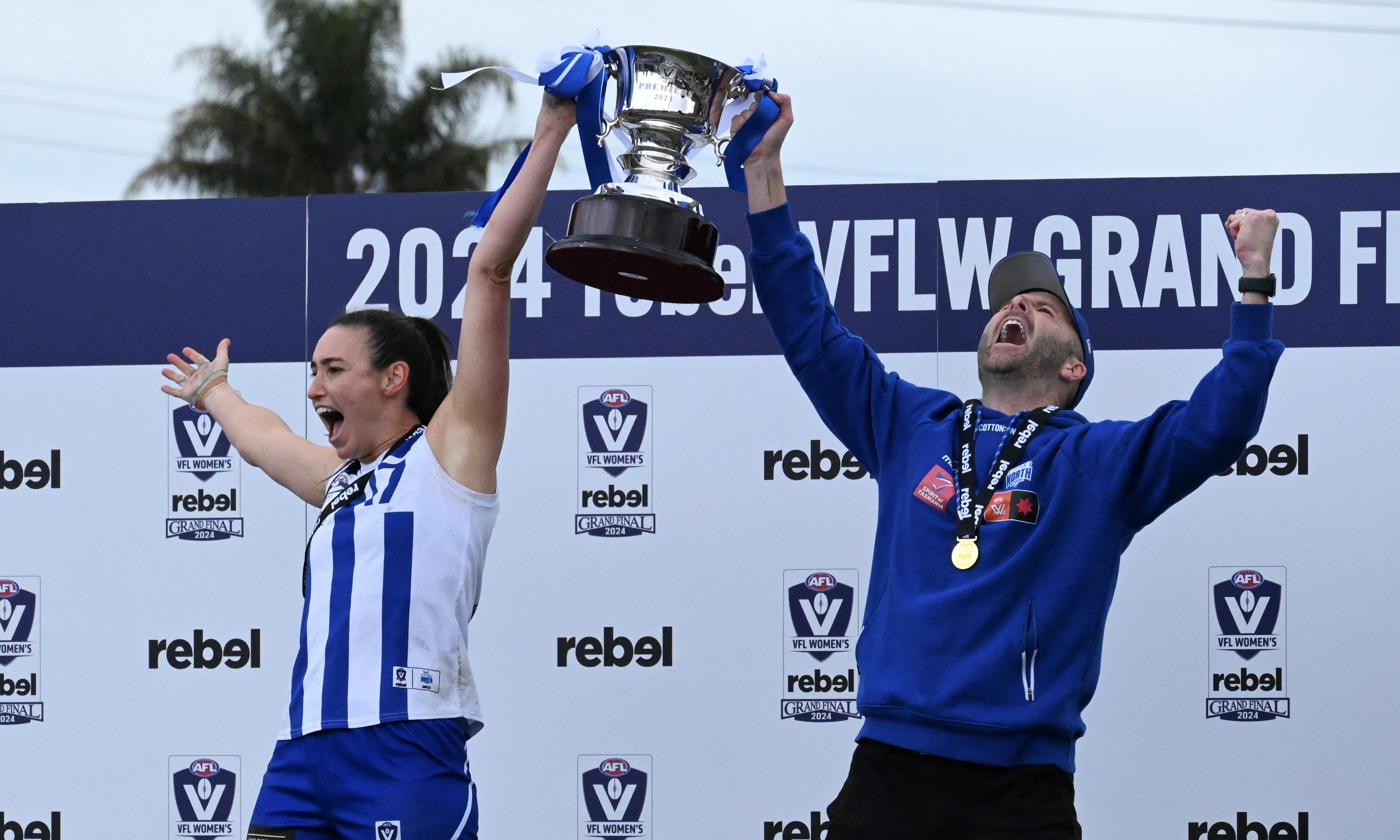
Captain Jess Jones (L) and coach Brett Gourley (R) celebrate with the 2024 VFL Women's premiership cup

The team was renamed North Melbourne Werribee ahead of the 2025 season, as North Melbourne and Werribee Football Club entered into an affiliation arrangement and shared home games. The side claimed a second consecutive premiership, defeating Collingwood in the Grand Final by six points.

==== VFL Women's season summaries ====
North Melbourne VFLW honour roll
| Season | Final position | Coach | Captain | Best and fairest | Leading goal kicker |
|---|---|---|---|---|---|
| 2021 | 10th | Cheyne Webster | Nikki Wallace | Meagan Kiely | Brooke Brown (8) |
| 2022 | 7th | Steph Binder | Molly Eastman | Liz McGrath | Sarah Skinner (12) |
| 2023 | 9th | Steph Binder | Jess Jones | Audrey Rhodes | Emily Paterno (9) |
| 2024 | Premiers | Brett Gourley | Jess Jones/Sarah King | Maddie Di Cosmo | Nyakoat Dojiok (22) |
| 2025 | Premiers | Brett Gourley | Renee Tierney | Maddie Di Cosmo | Nyakoat Dojiok (37) |
| 2026 | Premiers | Alex McKenzie | Renee Tierney | | Nyakoat Dojiok (20) |

Sources: Club historical data and VFLW stats

== Activism ==
=== Same-Sex Marriage ===
During the Australian Marriage Law Postal Survey, North Melbourne Football Club supported the Yes vote.

=== Voice to Parliament ===
North Melbourne Football Club was a supporter of the Voice to Parliament.

=== Poker machines ===
In 2008, North became the first Victorian AFL club to ‘exit’ poker machine ownership, the club noting at the time that it didn't want to make money off the losses of others.

=== Sustainability ===
In October 2025, North Melbourne became the first sporting club in Australia to receive a B Corp certification, for its ‘remarkable impact on social and environmental performance, as well as its accountability and transparency.’

== See also ==
- Sport in Australia
- Sport in Victoria
- List of North Melbourne Football Club players
