= Matt Adams (umpire) =

Australian rules football umpire

Personal information
- Full name: Matthew Adams
- Nicknames: Matt, Madams
- Height: 170 cm (5 ft 7 in)
- Other occupation: Teacher

Umpiring career
Years	League	Role	Games
2014–2017	AFL	Field umpire	1

Matt Adams is an Australian rules football umpire who has officiated in the Australian Football League.

Before umpiring in the AFL, he umpired in the West Australian Football League, officiating over 30 matches. He was appointed to the AFL rookie list in 2014, and made his debut, as an emergency umpire replacing an injured Matthew Leppard, in a match between West Coast and Gold Coast in Round 13 of that year. He left the AFL rookie list at the end of the 2017 season.
