= 2021 West Coast Eagles women's season =

AFL women's competition season

West Coast Eagles
2021 season
- Coach: Daniel Pratt (1st season)
- Captain(s): Emma Swanson (2nd season)
- Home ground: Mineral Resources Park; Optus Stadium
- AFLW season: 12th
- Best and Fairest: Isabella Lewis
- Leading goalkicker: Grace Kelly (7)
- Highest home attendance: 9,552 vs. Fremantle (Round 6)
- Lowest home attendance: 809 vs. St Kilda (Round 9)
- Club membership: 3,081

The West Coast Eagles are an Australian rules football team based in Perth, Western Australia. The 2021 AFL Women's season was their second season in that competition, their first season with Daniel Pratt as coach, and their second season with Emma Swanson as captain. They won two out of the nine games they played, their only wins being by one point against Gold Coast and 39 points against Geelong. They finished 12th out of 14 on the ladder, missing out on qualifying for finals.

The season was marked by many injuries to the team's players, most notably to star player Dana Hooker, who was unable to play for most of the season due to a kitchen accident. Young midfielders Mikayla Bowen and Isabella Lewis were standout players, both receiving Rising Star nominations. Lewis was the team's best and fairest player, winning the West Coast Club Champion medal. Bowen was the team's sole inclusion in the All-Australian squad. Grace Kelly was the team's leading goalkicker, with seven goals.

== Background ==
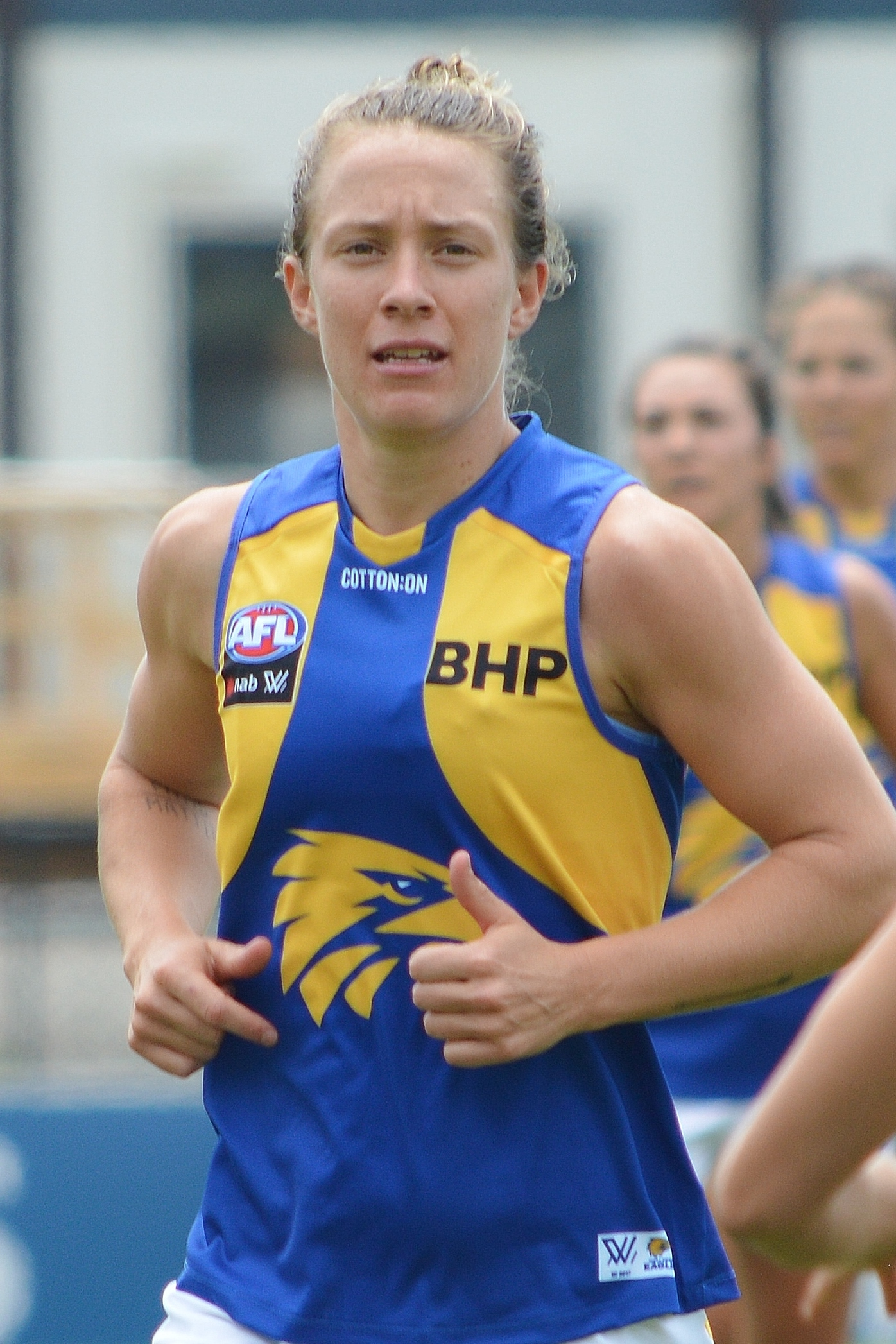
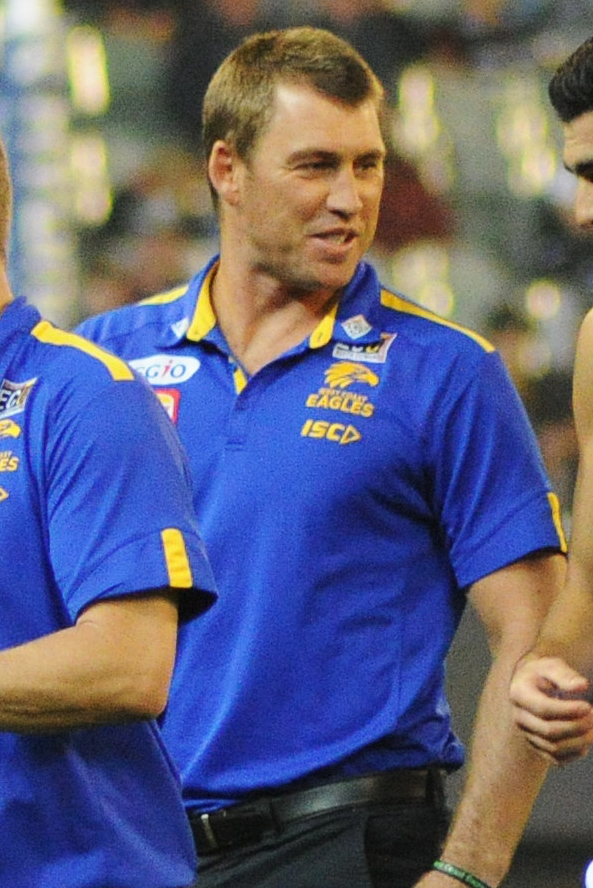
Emma Swanson (captain) and Daniel Pratt (coach)

The West Coast Eagles are an Australian rules football team based in Perth, Western Australia. They began playing in the AFL Women's in the 2020 season. That year, they won one out of their six games, finishing last on the ladder for their conference.

In October 2020, it was announced that Daniel Pratt would take over as senior coach from Luke Dwyer, who resigned. Pratt had been a development coach and an assistant coach for West Coast's men's team for seven years. He was assisted by forwardline coaches Michelle Cowan and Jo Beechey, midfield coaches Brady Grey and Ryan Turnbull, and backline coach Andrew Di Loreto. Emma Swanson was captain for a second season. Dana Hooker was vice-captain for a second season as well. Courtney Guard and Alicia Janz continued being part of the leadership group, along with newcomer Parris Laurie. Mikayla Bowen and Hayley Bullas were appointed as "emerging leaders", a new position which is used for developing leadership skills.

The club had 3,081 AFLW members in 2021, the second most of any club, behind St Kilda.

== Playing list ==
=== Changes ===
During the off season, Talia Radan and Emily Bonser retired, and Kate Bartlett, Cassie Davidson, Emily McGuire, Danika Pisconeri and Tarnee Tester were delisted. Andrea Gilmore was also delisted following a season as an injury replacement player. Tarnee Tester was later signed by Fremantle as a delisted free agent.

Due to West Coast's poor performance in 2020, before the start of the trade period, West Coast, and Richmond, were given a draft pick at the end of the first round (pick 16). This draft pick had the requirement that it had to be traded with another club for an established player. The pick was allowed to be traded in combination with other draft picks or players, but it could not be used in a trade that involved West Coast receiving any draft picks. During the 2020 trade period in August, West Coast had two trades. The first had West Coast receive Aisling McCarthy and pick 3 in the 2020 AFL Women's draft from the Western Bulldogs, in exchange for pick 2 and pick 16. The second had West Coast receive Tayla Bresland from Fremantle, in exchange for pick 46.

Before the 2020 AFLW, McKenzie Dowrick was placed on the inactive list to allow her more time to recover from surgery. During the 2020 draft on 6 October, teams were only allowed to pick from a pool of players in their state. West Coast drafted Isabella Lewis (pick 3), Shanae Davison (pick 18), Julie-Anne Norrish (pick 32) and Andrea Gilmore (pick 53), who was previously delisted. They passed on picks 56 and 59.

If players were undrafted in their nominated state, clubs from outside that state with room on their lists could sign those players. This mechanism enabled West Coast to sign Amber Ward and Lauren Gauci, both of whom are from South Australia, on 8 October. In November, Demi Liddle was signed as an injury replacement player for Ashton Hill, who ruptured an anterior cruciate ligament in round 1 of the previous season. In January, Katelyn Pope was signed as an injury replacement player for Mhicca Carter, who had a season-ending foot injury.

Removals from playing list
Player	Reason	Games played	Ref.
Talia Radan	Retired	16 (6 for West Coast)	
Emily Bonser	Retired	3	
Kate Bartlett	Delisted	1 (0 for West Coast)	
Cassie Davidson	Delisted	17 (3 for West Coast)	
Emily McGuire	Delisted	6 (3 for West Coast)	
Danika Pisconeri	Delisted	3	
Tarnee Tester	Delisted	4	
Andrea Gilmore	Delisted	0	

Additions to playing list
Player	Acquired	Former club	Former league	Ref.
Aisling McCarthy	Trade	Western Bulldogs	AFL Women's	
Tayla Bresland	Trade	Fremantle	AFL Women's	
Isabella Lewis	No. 3, 2020 draft	Claremont	WAFLW	
Shanae Davison	No. 18, 2020 draft	Swan District	WAFLW	
Julie-Anne Norrish	No. 32, 2020 draft	East Fremantle	WAFLW	
Andrea Gilmore	No. 53, 2020 draft	Claremont	WAFLW	
Amber Ward	Undrafted free agent	North Adelaide	SANFLW	
Lauren Gauci	Undrafted free agent	North Adelaide	SANFLW	
Demi Liddle	Injury replacement	Peel Thunder	WAFLW	
Katelyn Pope	Injury replacement	North Adelaide	SANFLW	

=== Statistics ===
Playing list and statistics
Player	No.	Games	Goals	Behinds	Kicks	Handballs	Disposals	Marks	Tackles	Notes/Milestone(s)
Mikayla Bowen	1	9	5	1	84	65	149	35	26	
Kellie Gibson	2	9	0	4	52	28	80	8	30	
Brianna Green	3	4	0	0	10	15	25	1	9	West Coast debut (round 1)
Courtney Guard	4	8	0	0	31	30	61	7	11	
McKenzie Dowrick	5	0	—	—	—	—	—	—	—	Inactive list
Isabella Lewis	6	9	0	2	71	47	118	16	43	AFLW debut (round 1)
Beatrice Devlyn	7	0	—	—	—	—	—	—	—	
Maddy Collier	8	7	1	1	59	35	94	11	28	
Ashlee Atkins	9	9	1	5	53	29	82	15	28	
Melissa Caulfield	10	7	3	1	31	26	57	7	23	
Aisling McCarthy	11	7	2	2	69	30	99	10	32	West Coast debut (round 1)
Niamh Kelly	12	7	3	4	56	31	87	15	19	Rookie
Emma Swanson	13	7	0	0	68	47	115	19	32	
Belinda Smith	14	9	0	0	62	55	117	22	21	
Grace Kelly	15	9	7	3	69	26	95	12	19	Rookie
Ashton Hill	16	0	—	—	—	—	—	—	—	
Dana Hooker	17	1	0	0	14	5	19	2	2	
Julie-Anne Norrish	18	0	—	—	—	—	—	—	—	
Imahra Cameron	19	8	6	4	28	11	39	7	17	
Tayla Bresland	20	5	0	0	35	8	43	11	14	West Coast debut (round 1)
Mhicca Carter	21	0	—	—	—	—	—	—	—	Rookie
Andrea Gilmore	22	3	1	1	9	3	12	1	8	AFLW debut (round 1)
Demi Liddle	23	4	0	0	3	7	10	1	7	AFLW debut (round 1)
Hayley Bullas	24	9	0	1	44	34	78	7	38	
Parris Laurie	25	9	1	2	29	49	78	17	14	
Lauren Gauci	26	6	0	0	26	28	54	5	9	AFLW debut (round 4)
Chantella Perera	27	8	0	0	34	28	62	13	16	
Shanae Davison	28	5	0	0	8	8	16	3	11	AFLW debut (round 1)
Katelyn Pope	29	6	1	1	19	23	42	1	9	AFLW debut (round 2)
Kate Orme	32	4	1	0	34	11	45	11	10	
Amber Ward	33	9	0	0	66	32	98	13	12	AFLW debut (round 1)
Sophie McDonald	35	5	0	0	21	13	34	4	3	
Alicia Janz	37	6	0	0	12	19	31	5	11	West Coast debut (round 4)

== Season summary ==
For the 2021 AFLW season, the conference system was removed, with every team now on the same ladder. The planned fixture was revealed on 11 December 2020; continued restrictions and border closures caused by the COVID-19 pandemic, however, forced it to change several times. The first change was rounds one and two, in which West Coast were originally going to face Gold Coast at Metricon Stadium, and then Richmond in Perth. That changed on 22 January to West Coast facing Adelaide in Perth, and then Greater Western Sydney (GWS) at Norwood Oval in Adelaide, in a GWS home match. This was because there were no restrictions to travel between Western Australia and South Australia, and GWS had temporarily relocated to Adelaide.

=== Rounds 1–4 ===
West Coast's round one match took place against the Adelaide Crows, the reigning premiers, on 30 January 2021. At half time, the Eagles were only behind by five points, as the Crows missed opportunities to score. However, Adelaide dominated the third quarter, kicking four unanswered goals and even preventing any inside 50s for West Coast. The final score was 18–56. This match had eight new players for West Coast, and three players suffered injuries: Brianna Green received an ankle injury, Maddy Collier was concussed and Demi Liddle injured her back.

Western Australia went into lockdown on 1 February, resulting in South Australia closing its border to Western Australia. West Coast's match against GWS was cancelled as a result, and West Coast were not allowed to train together during the lockdown. After the lockdown was lifted on 5 February, a Western Derby against Fremantle was scheduled instead for 7 February, albeit with no crowds. The derby meant that the Western Australian teams did not have to leave Western Australia or have another team enter. During the week between rounds one and two, vice-captain Dana Hooker cut a tendon in her foot when a knife fell off her kitchen bench, ruling her out for the rest of the season. She joined Green, Collier and Liddle as the four outs for round 2.

West Coast lost their match against Fremantle 14–23, playing at Fremantle Oval in heavy rain. Aisling McCarthy got the first and only goal in the first quarter, but Fremantle took over from there, reaching 20 points at three quarter time. Imahra Cameron kicked a goal in the final quarter to reduce the margin to 6 points, but Fremantle held off from there, winning by nine points. The result wasn't considered a total failure for West Coast, considering that their previous match against Fremantle was a 45-point blowout, and that Fremantle finished at the top of the ladder in 2020, however, there were several more injuries during the match. Niamh Kelly and Andrea Gilmore suffered finger injuries and Parris Laurie sustained a right knee injury. Katelyn Pope made her AFLW debut in this match. Daniel Pratt said after the match that West Coast may have to use players from outside their squad to field a team in round three if none of the injured players are able to play.

The fixture for round three was announced on 8 February. West Coast were scheduled to face Richmond at the Swinburne Centre on 14 February. A COVID-19 outbreak in Melbourne caused Western Australia to close its border to Victoria, resulting in the cancellation of West Coast's match against Richmond on 11 February. The following day, it was announced that West Coast would play Brisbane at Hickey Park on Monday, 15 February.

During the week between rounds two and three, Claremont WAFLW players Jessica Low and Sasha Goranova trained with West Coast in case the team needed them as top-up players. West Coast ended up not needing them, with several players back from injury for round three. Maddy Collier returned after completing concussion protocols, Parris Laurie and Andrea Gilmore's injuries were minor enough to allow them to return, and Melissa Caulfield was back for the first time this season following a pre-season hamstring injury. During the first half of their match against the Brisbane Lions, the Eagles dominated the inside 50s and clearances, but because they were unable to convert that into goals, the margin at half time was one point in favour of the Lions. Brisbane dominated for the rest of the match though, including kicking four goals in the first six minutes of the third quarter. The final score was 20–65 in favour of the Lions. Andrea Gilmore suffered another injury, this time a concussion in the third quarter, ruling her out of round four due to the concussion protocol.

The round four fixture was revealed on 14 February, with West Coast facing GWS on Sunday, 21 February at Blacktown International Sportspark Oval. In that match, Alicia Janz made her West Coast debut, and Lauren Gauci made her AFLW debut. West Coast were beaten yet again in round four, with the final score being 28–48. The Eagles lead for a brief moment in the first quarter, but GWS lead for the rest of the match. The only injury was to Aisling McCarthy, who had a knee injury after landing awkwardly in the third quarter.

=== Rounds 5–9 ===
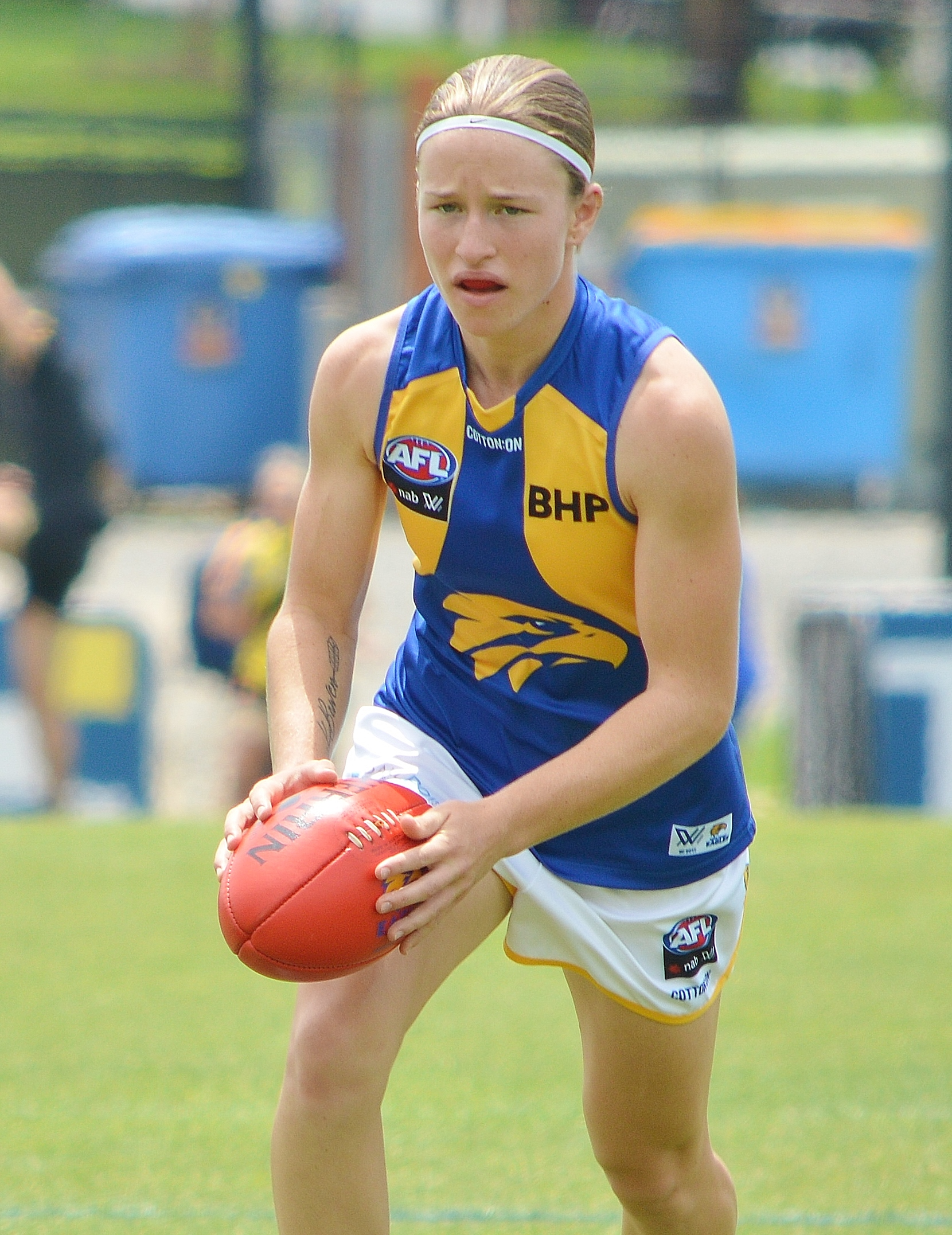
Mikayla Bowen received a Rising Star nomination for her effort in round five.

On 21 February, the round five fixture was revealed. West Coast were scheduled to play against fellow winless side Gold Coast, in the Eagles' first home game since round one. The round five match was Niamh Kelly's and Demi Liddle's first match back from injury. Aisling McCarthy was also due to play her first game back, but was a late out due to her knee injury, being replaced by Kate Orme. Sophie McDonald and Courtney Guard were omitted. West Coast got their first win of the season in that round, beating Gold Coast 34–33. Mikayla Bowen stood out, getting 21 disposals, seven marks, three clearances and the match-winning goal. She received a Rising Star nomination for her effort. Yet another injury occurred, with Tayla Bresland receiving a hamstring injury in the first quarter.

Between rounds five and six, over a third of West Coast's players were on its injury list. The round six fixture was revealed on 27 February. West Coast were scheduled to play Fremantle for the second time in a season. Aisling McCarthy made a return from injury in this game. The Eagles were thrashed by Fremantle, which was played at Optus Stadium in front of West Coast's largest crowd for the season. The final score was 8–75, with Grace Kelly scoring the Eagles' only goal.

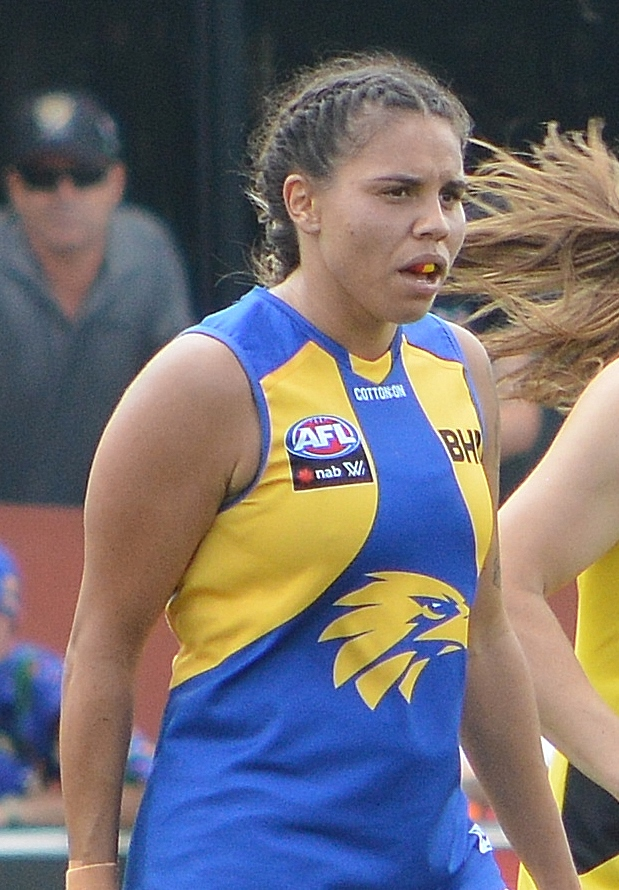
Imahra Cameron kicked three goals against Geelong, setting a club record.

The fixture for the remaining rounds was revealed on 4 March. West Coast were scheduled to play against Geelong at home in round seven, Richmond away in round eight, and St Kilda at home in round nine, all on the Sundays of each round. On 9 March, the round seven match against Geelong was changed to Monday, 15 March. In the match, West Coast had their second win of the season, and largest win in their history, beating Geelong 53–14. Imahra Cameron kicked three goals, a record for the club. Brianna Green was back from injury. Emma Swanson was reported to the match review panel for rough conduct due to an off-the-ball bump on Geelong's Georgie Rankin which gave Rankin a concussion. Swanson received a two match ban for the incident, causing her to miss the remainder of the season.

In round eight, West Coast were beaten by Richmond 34–42, although they almost made a comeback in the fourth quarter. At half time, the margin was 22 points with Richmond in front. The Eagles had kicked no goals in the first half compared to Richmond's three. But West Coast started to catch up during the second half, kicking three third-quarter goals, compared to Richmond with just one. The Eagles managed to get the margin to seven points during the fourth quarter, but Richmond managed to hold off West Coast. Mikayla Bowen and Isabella Lewis were the strongest among the midfield, with 21 and 18 disposals respectively. Lewis received a Rising Star nomination for this effort. West Coast suffered a multitude of injuries in that match, with Aisling McCarthy (corked thigh), Belinda Smith (cork), Shanae Davison (hamstring) and Maddy Collier (concussion) all injured.

Collier, McCarthy and Davison were all left out for the final match of the season due to their injuries, joining a large list of key players who could not play. Parris Laurie also suffered an ankle injury just before the start of the match, too late for her to be replaced in the team. West Coast were thrashed by St Kilda, the score being 20–76. West Coast ended the season 12th on the ladder, capping off an injury-plagued season having not qualified for finals.

=== Results ===
Regular season results
Round	Date	Result	Score			Opponent	Score			Ground		Attendance	Ladder
Round	Date	Result	G	B	T	Opponent	G	B	T	Ground		Attendance	Ladder
1	30 January	Lost	2	6	18	Adelaide	8	8	56	Mineral Resources Park	H	1,929	12th
2	7 February	Lost	2	2	14	Fremantle	2	11	23	Fremantle Oval	A	0	10th
3	15 February	Lost	2	8	20	Brisbane	10	5	65	Hickey Park	A	0	12th
4	21 February	Lost	4	4	28	Greater Western Sydney	7	6	48	Blacktown ISP Oval	A	974	12th
5	28 February	Won	5	4	34	Gold Coast	4	9	33	Mineral Resources Park	H	1,119	12th
6	7 March	Lost	1	2	8	Fremantle	11	9	75	Optus Stadium	H	9,552	12th
7	15 March	Won	8	5	53	Geelong	2	2	14	Mineral Resources Park	H	848	12th
8	21 March	Lost	5	4	34	Richmond	5	12	42	Swinburne Centre	A	619	11th
9	28 March	Lost	3	2	20	St Kilda	11	10	76	Mineral Resources Park	H	809	12th

Key
H	Home game
A	Away game

=== Ladder ===
Pos	Team	Pld	W	L	D	PF	PA	PP	Pts	Qualification
1	Adelaide	9	7	2	0	446	214	208.4	28	Finals series
2	Brisbane Lions (P)	9	7	2	0	390	200	195.0	28	Finals series
3	Collingwood	9	7	2	0	362	190	190.5	28	Finals series
4	Melbourne	9	7	2	0	382	293	130.4	28	Finals series
5	Fremantle	9	6	3	0	374	202	185.1	24	Finals series
6	North Melbourne	9	6	3	0	379	266	142.5	24	Finals series
7	Carlton	9	5	4	0	415	330	125.8	20	
8	Western Bulldogs	9	5	4	0	300	340	88.2	20	
9	Greater Western Sydney	9	4	5	0	240	324	74.1	16	
10	Richmond	9	3	6	0	312	369	84.6	12	
11	St Kilda	9	3	6	0	272	391	69.6	12	
12	West Coast	9	2	7	0	229	432	53.0	8	
13	Geelong	9	1	8	0	164	408	40.2	4	
14	Gold Coast	9	0	9	0	176	482	36.5	0	

Updated to match(es) played on 17 March 2021. Source: Womens.AFL
Rules for classification: 1) points; 2) percentage; 3) number of points for.
(P) Premiers

== Awards ==
Mikayla Bowen received a Rising Star nomination in round five, and Isabella Lewis received a nomination in round eight. Mikayla Bowen was also named in the initial 40-woman All-Australian squad, but was not named in the final 21-woman team. West Coast was only one of two teams that did not have any player in the All-Australian team in 2021, the other team being the Gold Coast Suns.

First-year player Isabella Lewis won the Club Champion award for best and fairest player, with 40 votes. Behind her was Aisling McCarthy, on 37 votes, Mikayla Bowen, on 35 votes, and Maddy Collier, Grace Kelly and Niamh Kelly, on 34 votes. Lewis was also the Best First Year Player, and Parris Laurie was Best Clubperson.

Awards received by West Coast players
Award	Awarded by	Player	Result	Ref.
All-Australian team	AFL Women's	Mikayla Bowen	Shortlisted	
Rising Star	AFL Women's	Mikayla Bowen (round 5)	Nominated	
Rising Star	AFL Women's	Isabella Lewis (round 8)	Nominated	
Club Champion	West Coast Eagles	Isabella Lewis	Won	
Best First Year Player	West Coast Eagles	Isabella Lewis	Won	
Best Clubperson	West Coast Eagles	Parris Laurie	Won	

== See also ==
- 2021 West Coast Eagles season
