= 2022 West Coast Eagles women's season =

AFL women's competition season

West Coast Eagles
2022 (S6) season
- Coach: Michael Prior (1st season)
- Captain(s): Emma Swanson (3rd season)
- Home ground: Mineral Resources Park; Optus Stadium
- AFLW season: 14th

The West Coast Eagles are an Australian rules football team based in Perth, Western Australia. 2022 AFL Women's season 6, which started in January 2021, is their third season in the competition. At the end of the 2021 season, West Coast delisted 10 players, gained a player via trade, a player via restricted free agency and five players at the 2021 AFL Women's draft. 2021 coach Daniel Pratt was replaced with Michael Prior, after Pratt resigned from the role.

== Background ==
The West Coast Eagles are an Australian rules football team based in Perth, Western Australia, that competes in the AFL Women's (AFLW). In the 2021 AFL Women's season, they finished the season with two wins and seven losses, placing them 12th on the ladder out of 14 teams, and thus missing out on playing in the 2021 finals series.

In September 2021, it was announced that Michael Prior would take over as head coach from Daniel Pratt, as Pratt's partner was scheduled to give birth early 2022, and they didn't want him to do any quarantine that could occur in the AFLW.

Emma Swanson was captain for a third season, and Dana Hooker was vice-captain for a third season. Parris Laurie was part of the leadership group for a second season, joined by Aisling McCarthy, who joined the leadership group for the first time. These positions were decided by a vote between the players.

== Playing list ==
=== Changes ===
During the off-season, Mhicca Carter, Beatrice Devlyn, McKenzie Dowrick, Brianna Green, Alicia Janz, Demi Liddle, Julie-Anne Norrish, Kate Orme, Chantella Perera and Katelyn Pope were delisted.

In May 2021, the AFL commission approved giving five AFLW clubs, including West Coast, various assistance measures to help strengthen their playing list. West Coast received priority draft picks in the second and third rounds of the 2021 draft, directly after the fifth selection in those rounds. The priority picks were given under the condition that West Coast's first five draft picks were not traded to another club. During the 2021 trade period, West Coast made one trade, with Fremantle. The Eagles received Fremantle player Evangeline Gooch in exchange for draft pick 38. West Coast also signed Aimee Schmidt as a restricted free agent, having grown up in Western Australia before playing for Greater Western Sydney for five years.

In the 2021 AFL Women's draft, teams were only allowed to pick from a pool of players in their state. West Coast held the first three out of four draft picks in Western Australia, with Fremantle holding the second in the state. West Coast ended up drafting Charlie Thomas (pick 3), Courtney Rowley (pick 21), Beth Schilling (pick 24), Sarah Lakay (pick 40) and Emily Bennett (pick 47).

Removals from playing list
Player	Reason	Games played	Ref.
Mhicca Carter	Delisted	1	
Beatrice Devlyn	Delisted	8 (6 at West Coast)	
McKenzie Dowrick	Delisted	12 (5 for West Coast)	
Brianna Green	Delisted	7 (4 for West Coast)	
Alicia Janz	Delisted	20 (6 for West Coast)	
Demi Liddle	Delisted	4	
Julie-Anne Norrish	Delisted	0	
Kate Orme	Delisted	7	
Chantella Perera	Delisted	13	
Katelyn Pope	Delisted	6	

Additions to playing list
Player	Acquired	Former club	Former league	Ref.
Evangeline Gooch	Trade	Fremantle	AFL Women's	
Aimee Schmidt	Restricted free agent	Greater Western Sydney	AFL Women's	
Charlie Thomas	No. 3, 2021 draft	Subiaco	WAFL Women's	
Courtney Rowley	No. 21, 2021 draft	Peel Thunder	WAFL Women's	
Beth Schilling	No. 24, 2021 draft	Peel Thunder	WAFL Women's	
Sarah Lakay	No. 40, 2021 draft	Swan Districts	WAFL Women's	
Emily Bennett	No. 47, 2021 draft	Claremont	WAFL Women's	

=== Statistics ===
Playing list and statistics
Player	No.	Games	Goals	Behinds	Kicks	Handballs	Disposals	Marks	Tackles	Notes/Milestone(s)
Mikayla Bowen	1	10	2	0	83	43	126	24	58	
Kellie Gibson	2	8	4	1	45	12	57	16	24	
Charlie Thomas	3	10	0	0	64	29	93	19	23	AFLW debut (round 1)
Courtney Guard	4	7	0	0	18	12	30	7	5	
Courtney Rowley	5	5	0	0	14	9	23	9	6	AFLW debut (round 3)
Isabella Lewis	6	10	1	0	65	58	123	14	42	
Aimee Schmidt	7	10	7	9	47	22	69	17	9	West Coast debut (round 1)
Maddy Collier	8	7	1	1	41	10	51	8	28	
Ashlee Atkins	9	8	1	0	32	18	50	10	26	
Melissa Caulfield	10	5	0	2	23	8	31	8	13	
Aisling McCarthy	11	4	1	0	21	20	41	5	10	
Niamh Kelly	12	9	2	2	73	20	93	18	14	
Emma Swanson	13	9	3	3	117	83	200	37	42	
Belinda Smith	14	10	0	0	78	34	112	37	18	
Grace Kelly	15	8	1	0	44	13	57	14	12	
Ashton Hill	16	8	0	0	42	11	53	21	11	
Dana Hooker	17	9	2	1	99	47	146	18	30	
Imahra Cameron	19	5	2	2	19	8	27	9	13	
Tayla Bresland	20	3	0	0	12	3	15	2	7	
Andrea Gilmore	22	8	0	2	20	11	31	11	15	
Sarah Lakay	23	8	0	0	15	21	36	6	19	AFLW debut (round 3)
Hayley Bullas	24	8	3	2	49	25	74	10	26	
Parris Laurie	25	10	0	0	40	46	86	26	19	
Lauren Gauci	26	2	0	0	1	6	7	2	3	
Emily Bennett	27	3	0	0	8	6	14	6	9	
Shanae Davison	28	4	0	1	11	7	18	5	5	
Beth Schilling	30	2	0	0	8	7	15	6	6	
Evangeline Gooch	31	9	1	1	85	16	101	14	14	West Coast debut (round 1)
Amber Ward	33	5	0	0	28	9	37	3	7	
Sophie McDonald	35	6	0	0	32	7	39	12	10	

== Season summary ==
2022 AFL Women's season 6 started in January 2022, ended in April 2022, and had 10 rounds.

=== Results ===
Regular season results
Round	Date	Result	Score			Opponent	Score			Ground		Attendance	Ladder
Round	Date	Result	G	B	T	Opponent	G	B	T	Ground		Attendance	Ladder
1	8 January	Lost	2	3	15	Fremantle	6	7	43	Fremantle Oval	A	5,533	13th
2	16 January	Lost	5	3	33	Gold Coast	7	4	46	Whitten Oval	H	587	11th
3	22 January	Lost	1	3	9	Adelaide	6	6	42	Punt Road Oval	H	323	12th
4	29 January	Cancelled				St Kilda				Trevor Barker Oval	A		13th
5	4 February	Lost	3	6	24	Geelong	4	3	27	GMHBA Stadium	A	1,938	
5	8 February	Won	2	10	22	St Kilda	2	8	20	Trevor Barker Oval	A	665	12th
6	12 February	Lost	3	4	22	Collingwood	7	4	46	Mineral Resources Park	A	1,295	12th
7	19 February	Lost	7	3	45	Richmond	10	8	68	Mineral Resources Park	H	878	13th
8	26 February	Lost	4	0	24	Brisbane	15	8	98	Mineral Resources Park	H	730	14th
9	5 March	Lost	1	2	8	Western Bulldogs	10	8	68	Optus Stadium	H	3,164	14th
10	12 March	Lost	3	2	20	North Melbourne	15	8	98	Arden Street Oval	A	1,032	14th

Key
H	Home game
A	Away game

=== Ladder ===
Pos	Team	Pld	W	L	D	PF	PA	PP	Pts	Qualification
1	Adelaide (P)	10	9	1	0	405	187	216.6	36	Finals series
2	Melbourne	10	9	1	0	470	252	186.5	36	Finals series
3	Brisbane	10	8	2	0	496	252	196.8	32	Finals series
4	North Melbourne	10	7	3	0	346	249	139.0	28	Finals series
5	Fremantle	10	7	3	0	383	284	134.9	28	Finals series
6	Collingwood	10	6	4	0	340	276	123.2	24	Finals series
7	Western Bulldogs	10	4	5	1	354	372	95.2	18	
8	Carlton	10	4	6	0	304	362	84.0	16	
9	Greater Western Sydney	10	4	6	0	303	409	74.1	16	
10	Gold Coast	10	3	6	1	294	431	68.2	14	
11	Richmond	10	3	7	0	344	423	81.3	12	
12	Geelong	10	2	8	0	242	301	80.4	8	
13	St Kilda	10	2	8	0	213	401	53.1	8	
14	West Coast	10	1	9	0	222	517	42.9	4	

Source: Womens.AFL
Rules for classification: 1) points; 2) percentage; 3) number of points for.
(P) Premiers
