= 2020 West Coast Eagles women's season =

West Coast Eagles
2020 season
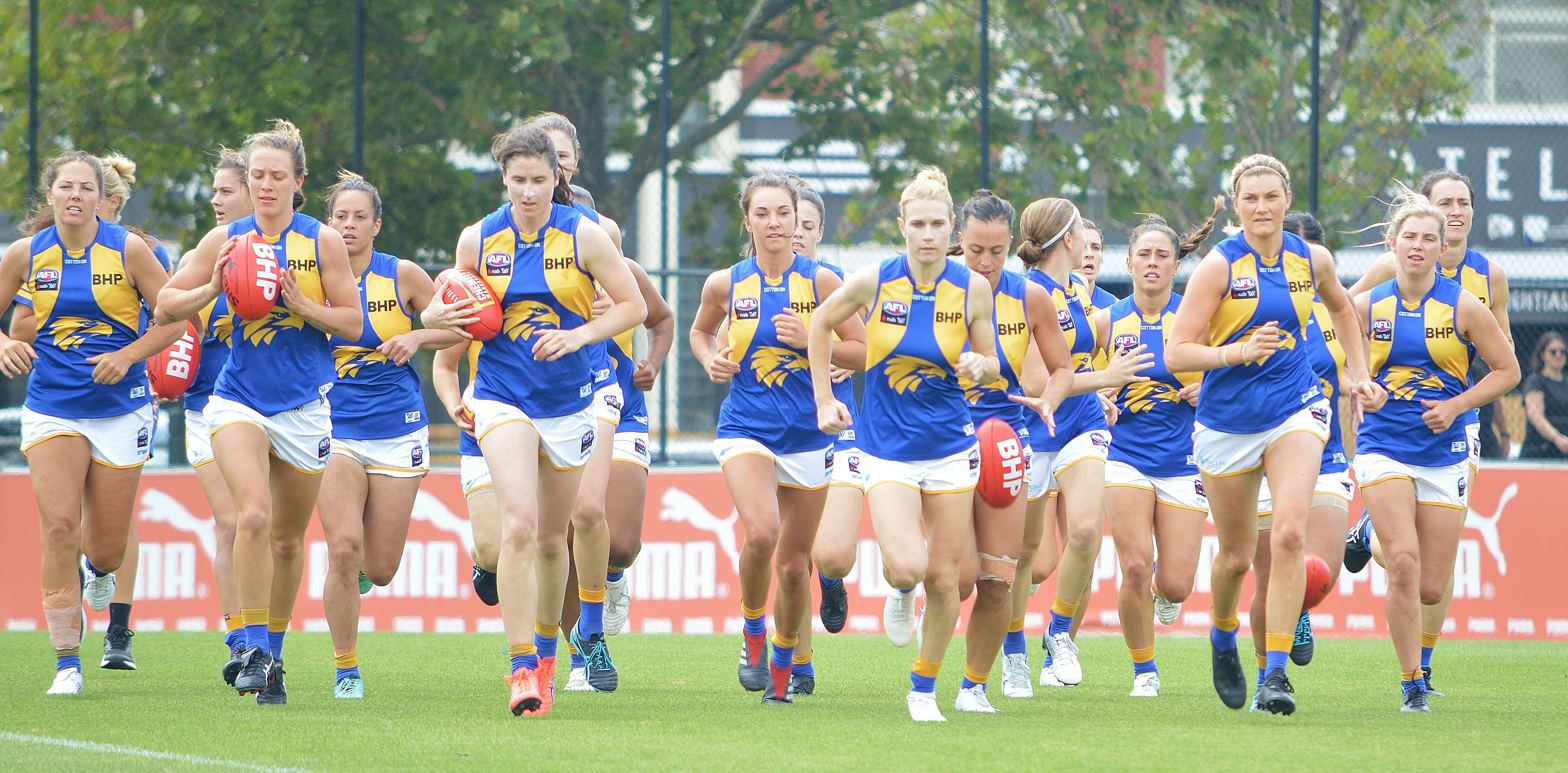
- West Coast Eagles warming up before a pre-season match against Richmond
- Coach: Luke Dwyer (1st season)
- Captain(s): Emma Swanson (1st season)
- Home ground: Mineral Resources Park; Leederville Oval; Optus Stadium
- AFLW season: 7th (Conference B)
- Best and Fairest: Dana Hooker
- Leading goalkicker: Hayley Bullas (2)
- Highest home attendance: 35,185 vs. Fremantle (Round 2)
- Lowest home attendance: 0 vs. Gold Coast (Round 6)
- Club membership: 3,318

The West Coast Eagles are an Australian rules football team based in Perth, Western Australia. The 2020 AFL Women's season was their first year in that competition. Luke Dwyer was the team's inaugural coach, and Emma Swanson was the team's inaugural captain. West Coast finished the home-and-away season seventh out of seven on the ladder, with a win–loss record of 1–5.

Dana Hooker was the team's best and fairest player, winning the West Coast Club Champion medal. Hayley Bullas was the team's leading goalkicker, with two goals.

== Background ==
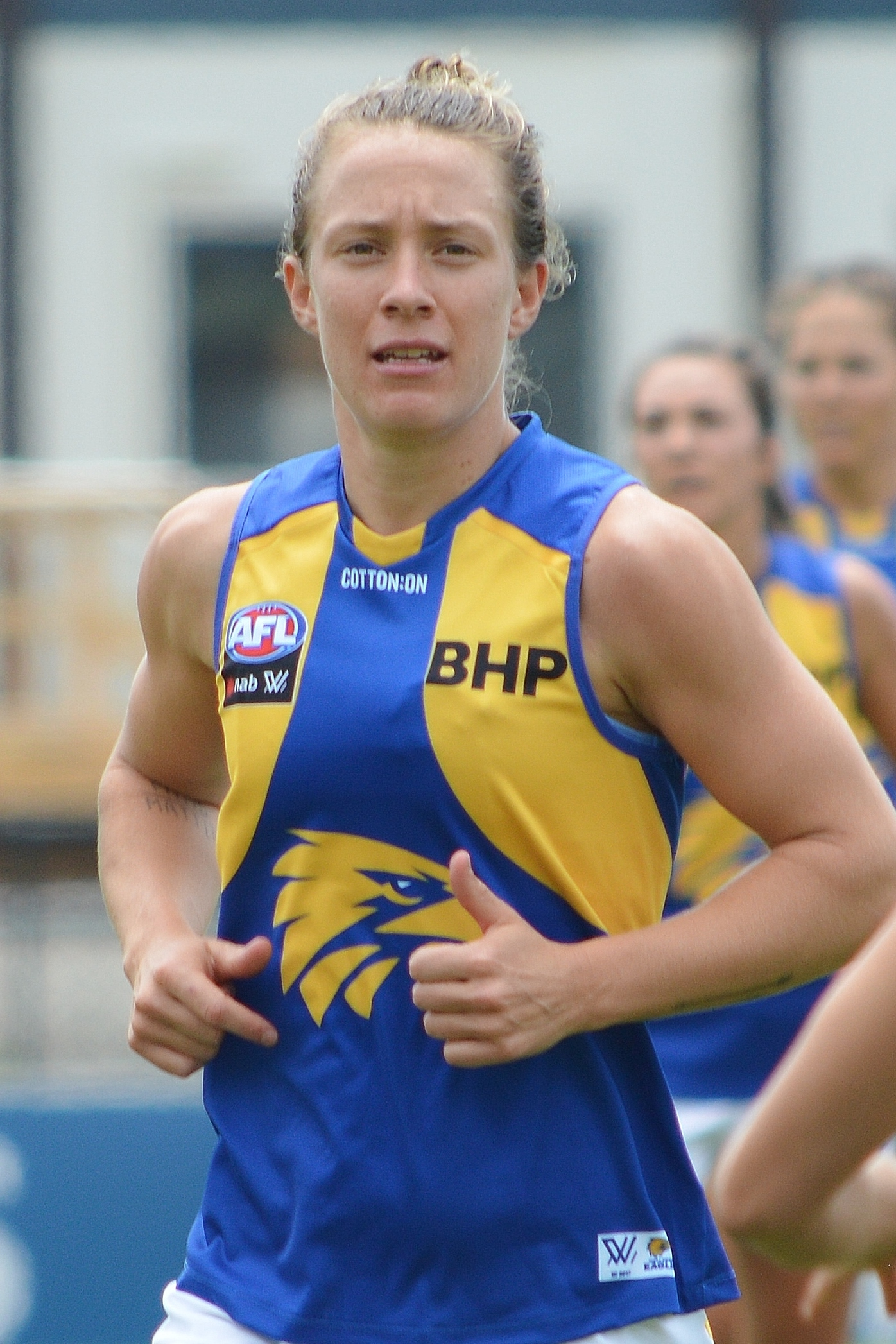
Emma Swanson captained West Coast in 2020.

The West Coast Eagles are an Australian rules football team based in Perth, Western Australia. Having competed in the men's Australian Football League since 1987, 2020 was their first year in the AFL Women's competition.

Luke Dwyer was announced as the inaugural West Coast Eagles AFLW coach in December 2018. He was already a development coach for the Eagles' men's team.

In December 2019, it was announced that Emma Swanson would be the team's inaugural captain, having previously served as vice-captain at Greater Western Sydney. The vice-captain was Dana Hooker, and the rest of the leadership group consisted of Maddy Collier, Courtney Guard and Alicia Janz.

West Coast had 3,318 members in 2020, the most of any AFLW club.

== Impact of COVID-19 ==
On 11 March 2020, COVID-19 was formally declared a pandemic. This was on the Wednesday prior to round 6. As a result, West Coast's round 6 match did not have any spectators, and their rounds 7 and 8 matches against Carlton and St Kilda were cancelled. Due to their ladder position at the end of round 6, West Coast did not proceed to the finals series.

== Playing list ==
=== Statistics ===
Playing list and statistics
| Player | No. | Games | Goals | Behinds | Kicks | Handballs | Disposals | Marks | Tackles | Notes/Milestone(s) |
|---|---|---|---|---|---|---|---|---|---|---|
| Mikayla Bowen | 1 | 6 | 1 | 1 | 34 | 28 | 62 | 5 | 31 | AFLW debut (round 1) |
| Kellie Gibson | 2 | 6 | 0 | 2 | 34 | 7 | 41 | 11 | 15 | |
| Brianna Green | 3 | 0 | — | — | — | — | — | — | — | |
| Courtney Guard | 4 | 6 | 0 | 0 | 34 | 14 | 48 | 8 | 14 | |
| McKenzie Dowrick | 5 | 5 | 1 | 0 | 18 | 9 | 27 | 5 | 13 | |
| Emily Bonser | 6 | 3 | 0 | 0 | 7 | 8 | 15 | 3 | 2 | AFLW debut (round 3) |
| Beatrice Devlyn | 7 | 6 | 0 | 0 | 21 | 8 | 29 | 6 | 9 | |
| Maddy Collier | 8 | 5 | 1 | 0 | 22 | 9 | 31 | 4 | 18 | |
| Ashlee Atkins | 9 | 6 | 1 | 1 | 40 | 14 | 54 | 8 | 19 | |
| Melissa Caulfield | 10 | 1 | 0 | 0 | 1 | 0 | 1 | 0 | 0 | |
| Danika Pisconeri | 11 | 3 | 0 | 1 | 10 | 6 | 16 | 4 | 7 | AFLW debut (round 1) |
| Niamh Kelly | 12 | 6 | 0 | 3 | 34 | 24 | 58 | 9 | 14 | Rookie, AFLW debut (round 1) |
| Emma Swanson | 13 | 6 | 1 | 3 | 79 | 23 | 102 | 13 | 27 | |
| Belinda Smith | 14 | 6 | 0 | 0 | 43 | 23 | 66 | 10 | 17 | |
| Grace Kelly | 15 | 6 | 1 | 2 | 20 | 12 | 32 | 8 | 5 | Rookie, AFLW debut (round 1) |
| Ashton Hill | 16 | 1 | 0 | 0 | 1 | 0 | 1 | 0 | 0 | AFLW debut (round 1) |
| Dana Hooker | 17 | 6 | 1 | 0 | 85 | 33 | 118 | 16 | 41 | |
| Imahra Cameron | 19 | 6 | 1 | 4 | 58 | 25 | 83 | 15 | 21 | AFLW debut (round 1) |
| Kate Bartlett | 20 | 0 | — | — | — | — | — | — | — | |
| Mhicca Carter | 21 | 1 | 0 | 0 | 2 | 4 | 6 | 1 | 0 | Rookie, AFW debut (round 6) |
| Tarnee Tester | 23 | 4 | 1 | 0 | 10 | 8 | 18 | 5 | 5 | AFLW debut (round 1) |
| Hayley Bullas | 24 | 6 | 2 | 0 | 35 | 15 | 50 | 5 | 24 | AFLW debut (round 1) |
| Parris Laurie | 25 | 6 | 0 | 1 | 20 | 34 | 54 | 12 | 16 | |
| Talia Radan | 26 | 6 | 0 | 0 | 16 | 13 | 29 | 3 | 10 | |
| Chantella Perera | 27 | 5 | 0 | 0 | 22 | 13 | 35 | 9 | 15 | AFLW debut (round 1) |
| Emily McGuire | 31 | 3 | 0 | 0 | 5 | 4 | 9 | 3 | 7 | |
| Kate Orme | 32 | 3 | 0 | 0 | 11 | 3 | 14 | 2 | 2 | AFLW debut (round 2) |
| Cassie Davidson | 33 | 3 | 0 | 0 | 8 | 9 | 17 | 3 | 9 | |
| Sophie McDonald | 35 | 5 | 0 | 0 | 26 | 6 | 32 | 5 | 11 | AFLW debut (round 1) |
| Alicia Janz | 37 | 0 | — | — | — | — | — | — | — | |
| Rosie Deegan | | 0 | — | — | — | — | — | — | — | |

== Season summary ==
West Coast were in Conference B for the 2020 AFLW season.

=== Results ===
Regular season results
| Round | Date | Result | Score | | | Opponent | Score | | | Ground | | Attendance | Ladder |
| Round | Date | Result | G | B | T | Opponent | G | B | T | Ground | | Attendance | Ladder |
|---|---|---|---|---|---|---|---|---|---|---|---|---|---|
| 1 | 9 February | Lost | 1 | 5 | 11 | Collingwood | 5 | 8 | 38 | Victoria Park | A | 6,100 | 7rd |
| 2 | 15 February | Lost | 2 | 3 | 15 | Fremantle | 9 | 6 | 60 | Optus Stadium | H | 35,185 | 7rd |
| 3 | 23 February | Lost | 2 | 2 | 14 | Greater Western Sydney | 6 | 6 | 42 | Blacktown ISP Oval | A | 1,980 | 7rd |
| 4 | 29 February | Won | 4 | 6 | 30 | Western Bulldogs | 3 | 8 | 26 | Leederville Oval | H | 2,455 | 7rd |
| 5 | 8 March | Lost | 1 | 1 | 7 | Melbourne | 10 | 6 | 66 | Casey Fields | A | 1,800 | 7rd |
| 6 | 15 March | Lost | 1 | 2 | 8 | Gold Coast | 5 | 3 | 33 | Mineral Resources Park | H | 0 | 7rd |
| 7 | 21 March | Cancelled | | | | Carlton | | | | Ikon Park | A | 0 | N/A |
| 8 | 29 March | Cancelled | | | | St Kilda | | | | Mineral Resources Park | H | 0 | N/A |

Key
| H | Home game |
| A | Away game |

=== Ladder ===
Conference B
| Pos | Team | Pld | W | L | D | PF | PA | PP | Pts | Qualification |
|---|---|---|---|---|---|---|---|---|---|---|
| 1 | Fremantle | 6 | 6 | 0 | 0 | 277 | 179 | 154.7 | 24 | Finals series |
| 2 | Carlton | 6 | 5 | 1 | 0 | 249 | 164 | 151.8 | 20 | Finals series |
| 3 | Melbourne | 6 | 4 | 2 | 0 | 204 | 124 | 164.5 | 16 | Finals series |
| 4 | Collingwood | 6 | 4 | 2 | 0 | 229 | 149 | 153.7 | 16 | Finals series |
| 5 | St Kilda | 6 | 2 | 4 | 0 | 154 | 170 | 90.6 | 8 | |
| 6 | Western Bulldogs | 6 | 1 | 5 | 0 | 179 | 246 | 72.8 | 4 | |
| 7 | West Coast | 6 | 1 | 5 | 0 | 77 | 232 | 33.2 | 4 | |

Source: womens.afl
Rules for classification: 1) points; 2) percentage; 3) number of points for.

== Awards ==
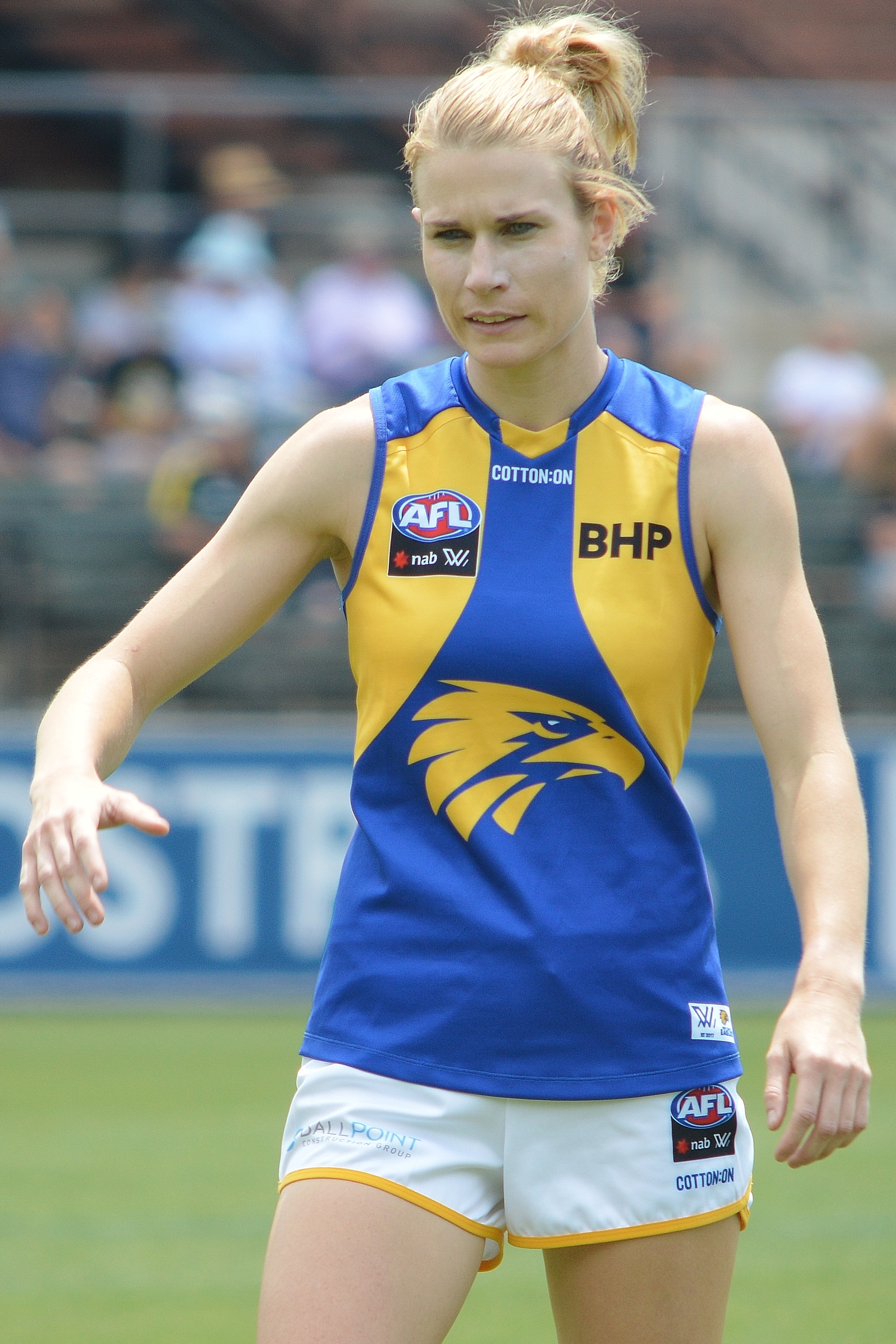
Dana Hooker won West Coast's inaugural Club Champion award

West Coast held its inaugural AFLW awards night at Mineral Resources Park on 11 August 2020. Vice-captain Dana Hooker won the Club Champion award with 26 votes. The runners-up were Emma Swanson, with 25 votes, and Ashlee Atkins and Parris Laurie with 23 votes. Imahra Cameron was the Best First Year Player, and Alicia Janz was the Best Club Person.

Dana Hooker was West Coast's only player in the 40-woman initial All-Australian squad. She did not get selected for the All-Australian team.

Awards received by West Coast players
| Award | Awarded by | Player | Result | Ref. |
|---|---|---|---|---|
| All-Australian team | AFL Women's | Dana Hooker | Shortlisted | |
| Club Champion | West Coast Eagles | Dana Hooker | Won | |
| Best First Year Player | West Coast Eagles | Imahra Cameron | Won | |
| Best Club Person | West Coast Eagles | Alicia Janz | Won | |

== See also ==
- 2020 West Coast Eagles season
