= List of AFL Women's debuts in 2021 =

List of Players In AFLW

The following is the list of players in the AFL Women's (AFLW) who have either made their AFLW debut or played for a new club during the 2021 AFL Women's season.

== Summary ==
Summary of debuts in 2021
Club	Debut		Total
Club	AFLW	New club	Total
Adelaide	1	3	4
Brisbane	2	1	3
Carlton	4	2	6
Collingwood	5	1	5
Fremantle	2	0	2
Geelong	6	0	6
Gold Coast	7	4	11
Greater Western Sydney	4	1	5
Melbourne	4	0	4
North Melbourne	4	1	4
Richmond	3	4	7
St Kilda	7	2	9
West Coast	7	4	11
Western Bulldogs	4	1	4
Total	61	24	85

== AFL Women's debuts ==
Name	Club	Age at debut	Debut round	Notes
Charlotte Hammans	Carlton	19 years, 316 days	1	Traded in 2020
Mimi Hill	Carlton	18 years, 116 days	1	Pick 12, 2020 AFL Women's draft
Tarni Brown	Collingwood	18 years, 308 days	1	Pick 19, 2020 AFL Women's draft
Bella Smith	Collingwood	19 years, 130 days	1	Free agency signing, 2020
Amelia Velardo	Collingwood	18 years, 245 days	1	Pick 25, 2020 AFL Women's draft
Alice Burke	St Kilda	18 years, 352 days	1	Pick 24, 2020 AFL Women's draft
Tahlia Meyer	St Kilda	25 years, 207 days	1	Free agency signing, 2020
Renee Saulitis	St Kilda	18 years, 168 days	1	Pick 34, 2020 AFL Women's draft
Tyanna Smith	St Kilda	18 years, 92 days	1	Pick 6, 2020 AFL Women's draft
Jacqui Vogt	St Kilda	26 years, 323 days	1	Pick 40, 2020 AFL Women's draft
Jess Fitzgerald	Western Bulldogs	18 years, 327 days	1	Pick 2, 2020 AFL Women's draft
Sarah Hartwig	Western Bulldogs	18 years, 292 days	1	Pick 11, 2020 AFL Women's draft
Annise Bradfield	Gold Coast	18 years, 59 days	1	Pick 7, 2020 AFL Women's draft
Daisy D'Arcy	Gold Coast	18 years, 49 days	1	Pick 60, 2020 AFL Women's draft
Elizabeth Keaney	Gold Coast	29 years, 39 days	1	Pick 58, 2020 AFL Women's draft
Maddison Levi	Gold Coast	18 years, 278 days	1	Pick 50, 2020 AFL Women's draft
Lucy Single	Gold Coast	18 years, 124 days	1	Pick 57, 2020 AFL Women's draft
Alyssa Bannan	Melbourne	18 years, 292 days	1	Pick 5, 2020 AFL Women's draft
Megan Fitzsimon	Melbourne	18 years, 173 days	1	Pick 35, 2020 AFL Women's draft
Eliza McNamara	Melbourne	18 years, 268 days	1	Pick 15, 2020 AFL Women's draft
Shanae Davison	West Coast	19 years, 165 days	1	Pick 18, 2020 AFL Women's draft
Andrea Gilmore	West Coast	32 years, 95 days	1	Pick 53, 2020 AFL Women's draft
Isabella Lewis	West Coast	18 years, 75 days	1	Pick 3, 2020 AFL Women's draft
Demi Liddle	West Coast	21 years, 237 days	1	Free agency signing, 2020
Amber Ward	West Coast	19 years, 110 days	1	Free agency signing, 2020
Teah Charlton	Adelaide	18 years, 280 days	1	Pick 4, 2020 AFL Women's draft
Darcy Moloney	Geelong	18 years, 72 days	1	Pick 10, 2020 AFL Women's draft
Isabella Eddey	North Melbourne	18 years, 355 days	1	Pick 13, 2020 AFL Women's draft
Alice O'Loughlin	North Melbourne	18 years, 207 days	1	Pick 22, 2020 AFL Women's draft
Luka Lesosky-Hay	Richmond	18 years, 214 days	1	Pick 52, 2020 AFL Women's draft
Ellie McKenzie	Richmond	18 years, 106 days	1	Pick 1, 2020 AFL Women's draft
Courtney Hodder	Brisbane	20 years, 207 days	1	Rookie signing, 2020
Mikayla Hyde	Fremantle	19 years, 19 days	1	Replacement player, 2021
Sarah Verrier	Fremantle	18 years, 182 days	1	Pick 14, 2020 AFL Women's draft
Tarni Evans	Greater Western Sydney	18 years, 365 days	1	Pick 9, 2020 AFL Women's draft
Erin Todd	Greater Western Sydney	34 years, 363 days	1	Free agency signing, 2020
Joanna Lin	Collingwood	18 years, 352 days	2	Pick 26, 2020 AFL Women's draft
Olivia Barber	Geelong	18 years, 207 days	2	Pick 21, 2020 AFL Women's draft
Stephanie Williams	Geelong	19 years, 10 days	2	Pick 27, 2020 AFL Women's draft
Katelyn Pope	West Coast	24 years, 315 days	2	Replacement player, 2021
Nicole Garner	Geelong	28 years, 239 days	3	Pick 50, 2019 AFL Women's draft
Isabella Grant	Western Bulldogs	19 years, 144 days	3	Pick 47, 2019 AFL Women's draft (Father–daughter selection – Chris Grant)
Georgia Garnett	Greater Western Sydney	19 years, 161 days	3	Pick 90, 2019 AFL Women's draft
Janet Baird	Gold Coast	21 years, 32 days	3	Pick 54, 2020 AFL Women's draft
Jessica Matin	St Kilda	18 years, 230 days	3	Replacement player, 2020
Daisy Walker	Carlton	18 years, 252 days	3	Pick 28, 2020 AFL Women's draft
Tessa Lavey	Richmond	27 years, 322 days	3	Pick 43, 2020 AFL Women's draft
Rebecca Ott	St Kilda	26 years, 194 days	4	Replacement player, 2021
Laura Gardiner	Geelong	18 years, 90 days	4	Pick 20, 2020 AFL Women's draft
Brooke Brown	North Melbourne	23 years, 322 days	4	Pick 49, 2020 AFL Women's draft
Indy Tahau	Brisbane	18 years, 122 days	4	Pick 37, 2020 AFL Women's draft
Lauren Magee	Melbourne	23 years, 232 days	4	2020 Rookie signing (Gaelic football)
Lauren Gauci	West Coast	24 years, 319 days	4	Free agency signing, 2020
Serena Gibbs	Carlton	20 years, 269 days	5	Pick 44, 2019 AFL Women's draft
Wallis Randell	Gold Coast	19 years, 229 days	5	Pick 61, 2020 AFL Women's draft
Georgia Hammond	North Melbourne	28 years, 164 days	6	Pick 44, 2020 AFL Women's draft
Libby Graham	Greater Western Sydney	23 years, 175 days	6	Pick 42, 2020 AFL Women's draft
Abbi Moloney	Collingwood	18 years, 189 days	6	Pick 31, 2020 AFL Women's draft
Isabelle Pritchard	Western Bulldogs	18 years, 364 days	6	Pick 16, 2020 AFL Women's draft
Carly Remmos	Geelong	18 years, 216 days	8	Pick 39, 2020 AFL Women's draft

== Change of AFL Women's club ==
Name	Club	Age at debut	Debut round	Former club(s)	Recruiting method
Maddy Guerin	Carlton	21 years, 95 days	1	Melbourne	Traded in 2020
Elise O'Dea	Carlton	29 years, 146 days	1	Melbourne	Traded in 2020
Aliesha Newman	Collingwood	25 years, 134 days	1	Melbourne	Traded in 2020
Jayde Van Dyk	St Kilda	24 years, 307 days	1	Carlton	Traded in 2020
Katie Lynch	Western Bulldogs	20 years, 298 days	1	Collingwood	Traded in 2020
Alison Drennan	Gold Coast	30 years, 0 days	1	North Melbourne, St Kilda	Traded in 2020
Sarah Perkins	Gold Coast	27 years, 188 days	1	Adelaide, Melbourne	Pick 23, 2020 AFL Women's draft
Tayla Bresland	West Coast	24 years, 361 days	1	Fremantle	Traded in 2020
Brianna Green	West Coast	24 years, 71 days	1	Fremantle	Expansion signing, 2019
Aisling McCarthy	West Coast	24 years, 341 days	1	Western Bulldogs	Traded in 2020
Lisa Whiteley	Adelaide	28 years, 52 days	1	Greater Western Sydney	Traded in 2020
Ashleigh Woodland	Adelaide	22 years, 143 days	1	Melbourne	Pick 47, 2020 AFL Women's draft
Harriet Cordner	Richmond	28 years, 193 days	1	Melbourne	Traded in 2020
Sarah D'Arcy	Richmond	29 years, 162 days	1	Collingwood	Traded in 2020
Sarah Dargan	Richmond	21 years, 363 days	1	Collingwood	Traded in 2020
Sarah Hosking	Richmond	25 years, 60 days	1	Carlton	Traded in 2020
Taylor Smith	Brisbane	20 years, 353 days	1	Gold Coast	Traded in 2020
Bianca Jakobsson	St Kilda	27 years, 314 days	2	Carlton, Melbourne	Traded in 2020
Georgia Bevan	Gold Coast	27 years, 241 days	2	Adelaide	Replacement player signing in 2020
Grace Campbell	North Melbourne	25 years, 70 days	3	Richmond	Traded in 2020
Hannah Munyard	Adelaide	19 years, 201 days	4	Western Bulldogs	Traded in 2020
Alicia Janz	West Coast	30 years, 272 days	4	Fremantle	Expansion signing, 2019
Katherine Smith	Greater Western Sydney	22 years, 152 days	5	Melbourne	Traded in 2020
Emma Pittman	Gold Coast	28 years, 80 days	8	Brisbane	Traded in 2019

== See also ==
- List of AFL debuts in 2021
