= Demi Liddle =

Australian rules football player

Personal information
- Born: 7 June 1999 (age 27)
- Original teams: Peel Thunder, (WAFLW)
- Draft: Injury replacement for Ashton Hill, West Coast
- Debut: 30 January 2021, West Coast vs. Adelaide, at Lathlain Park
- Height: 175 cm (5 ft 9 in)
- Position: Key defender

Club information
- Current club: West Coast
- Number: 23

Playing career^{1}
Years	Club	Games (Goals)
2021	West Coast	4 (0)
- ^{1} Playing statistics correct to the end of 2021.

Demi Liddle (born 7 June 1999) is an Australian rules footballer that played for the West Coast Eagles in the AFL Women's (AFLW) in their 2021 season.

== Career ==
Demi Liddle has played basketball since she was 10 years old. When she was 16, she signed with the South West Slammers.

Liddle started playing Australian rules football in 2017, playing for her local club, Busselton Football Club. She signed with Peel Thunder Football Club in the WAFL Women's for 2018, playing there for three years, including their 2020 premiership.

Liddle was brought onto West Coast's playing list in November 2020 as an injury replacement player for Ashton Hill. Hill had been moved to the inactive list due to needing more time to recover after rupturing an anterior cruciate ligament in round 1 of the 2020 season. She debuted in round 1 of the 2021 AFLW season, against Adelaide.

Liddle was automatically delisted by West Coast at the end of the 2021 season as she was an injury replacement player. She again played for Peel Thunder in 2021, and went on to play in their premiership that year.

== Statistics ==
Statistics are correct to the end of the 2021 AFLW season

Legend
G	Goals	K	Kicks	D	Disposals	T	Tackles
B	Behinds	H	Handballs	M	Marks

Season	Team	No.	Games	Totals							Averages (per game)							Votes
Season	Team	No.	Games	G	B	K	H	D	M	T	G	B	K	H	D	M	T	Votes
2021	West Coast	23	4	0	0	3	7	10	1	7	0.0	0.0	0.7	1.7	2.5	0.2	1.7	0
Career			4	0	0	3	7	10	1	7	0.0	0.0	0.7	1.7	2.5	0.2	1.7	0
