= List of AFL debuts in 2021 =

This is a list of players in the Australian Football League (AFL) who have either made their AFL debut or played for a new club during the 2021 AFL season.

== Summary ==
Summary of debuts in 2021
| Club | AFL debuts | Change of club |
|---|---|---|
| Adelaide | 9 | 2 |
| Brisbane Lions | 3 | 2 |
| Carlton | 3 | 4 |
| Collingwood | 9 | 0 |
| Essendon | 7 | 3 |
| Fremantle | 5 | 0 |
| Geelong | 4 | 3 |
| Gold Coast | 3 | 3 |
| Greater Western Sydney | 6 | 1 |
| Hawthorn | 8 | 2 |
| Melbourne | 2 | 1 |
| North Melbourne | 6 | 5 |
| Port Adelaide | 5 | 2 |
| Richmond | 7 | 1 |
| St Kilda | 5 | 5 |
| Sydney | 3 | 1 |
| West Coast | 3 | 2 |
| Western Bulldogs | 6 | 3 |
| Total | 94 | 40 |

== AFL 2021 debuts ==
| Name | Club | Age at debut | Debut round | Games (in 2021) | Goals (in 2021) | Notes |
|---|---|---|---|---|---|---|
| Oliver Henry | Collingwood | 18 years, 233 days | 1 | 10 | 7 | Pick 17, 2020 national draft |
| Lachlan McNeil | Western Bulldogs | 20 years, 38 days | 1 | 13 | 7 | Pick 11, 2021 rookie draft |
| Anthony Scott | Western Bulldogs | 26 years, 19 days | 1 | 21 | 10 | 2020 Pre-season supplemental selection |
| James Jordon | Melbourne | 20 years, 90 days | 1 | 25 | 6 | Pick 33, 2018 national draft |
| Lloyd Meek | Fremantle | 22 years, 332 days | 1 | 9 | 1 | Pick 69, 2017 national draft |
| Sam Berry | Adelaide | 19 years, 36 days | 1 | 17 | 5 | Pick 28, 2020 national draft |
| James Rowe | Adelaide | 21 years, 184 days | 1 | 19 | 15 | Pick 38, 2020 national draft |
| Harrison Jones | Essendon | 20 years, 23 days | 1 | 16 | 20 | Pick 30, 2019 national draft |
| Nikolas Cox | Essendon | 19 years, 64 days | 1 | 22 | 9 | Pick 8, 2020 national draft |
| Jacob Koschitzke | Hawthorn | 20 years, 252 days | 1 | 20 | 27 | Pick 52, 2018 national draft |
| Tyler Brockman | Hawthorn | 18 years, 118 days | 1 | 11 | 10 | Pick 46, 2020 national draft |
| Connor Downie | Hawthorn | 18 years, 293 days | 1 (unused substitute) | 2 | 0 | Pick 35, 2020 national draft |
| Harry Sharp | Brisbane Lions | 18 years, 93 days | 1 | 2 | 0 | Pick 43, 2020 national draft |
| Logan McDonald | Sydney | 18 years, 350 days | 1 | 7 | 9 | Pick 4, 2020 national draft |
| Braeden Campbell | Sydney | 19 years, 44 days | 1 | 8 | 1 | Pick 5, 2020 national draft |
| Errol Gulden | Sydney | 18 years, 245 days | 1 | 18 | 14 | Pick 32, 2020 national draft |
| Tom Powell | North Melbourne | 19 years, 19 days | 1 | 13 | 4 | Pick 13, 2020 national draft |
| Charlie Lazzaro | North Melbourne | 18 years, 361 days | 1 | 12 | 3 | Pick 36, 2020 national draft |
| Miles Bergman | Port Adelaide | 19 years, 154 days | 1 | 23 | 7 | Pick 14, 2019 national draft |
| Matt Flynn | Greater Western Sydney | 23 years, 189 days | 1 | 12 | 5 | Pick 41, 2015 national draft |
| Tanner Bruhn | Greater Western Sydney | 18 years, 298 days | 1 | 13 | 4 | Pick 12, 2020 national draft |
| Paul Hunter | St Kilda | 28 years, 40 days | 1 | 7 | 2 | 2020 Pre-season supplemental selection |
| Tom Highmore | St Kilda | 23 years, 25 days | 1 | 13 | 0 | Pick 45, 2020 national draft |
| Francis Evans | Geelong | 19 years, 215 days | 2 | 2 | 2 | Pick 41, 2019 national draft |
| Jaxon Prior | Brisbane Lions | 19 years, 295 days | 2 | 18 | 6 | Pick 59, 2019 national draft |
| Nick Murray | Adelaide | 20 years, 99 days | 2 | 13 | 1 | 2020 Pre-season supplemental selection |
| Heath Chapman | Fremantle | 19 years, 56 days | 2 | 6 | 1 | Pick 14, 2020 national draft |
| Beau McCreery | Collingwood | 19 years, 347 days | 3 (unused substitute) | 13 | 11 | Pick 44, 2020 national draft |
| Will Phillips | North Melbourne | 18 years, 315 days | 3 | 16 | 3 | Pick 3, 2020 national draft |
| Alec Waterman | Essendon | 24 years, 227 days | 3 | 14 | 17 | 2020 Pre-season supplemental selection |
| Archie Perkins | Essendon | 19 years, 8 days | 3 | 21 | 9 | Pick 9, 2020 national draft |
| Luke Parks | Carlton | 19 years, 351 days | 3 | 6 | 0 | Pick 8, 2021 rookie draft |
| Max Holmes | Geelong | 18 years, 219 days | 3 | 12 | 1 | Pick 20, 2020 national draft |
| Lachie Jones | Port Adelaide | 19 years | 4 | 6 | 1 | Pick 16, 2020 national draft |
| Rhyan Mansell | Richmond | 20 years, 309 days | 4 | 13 | 1 | 2020 Pre-season supplemental selection |
| Will Martyn | Richmond | 20 years, 11 days | 4 | 3 | 0 | Pick 44, 2019 national draft |
| Isiah Winder | West Coast | 18 years, 329 days | 4 | 1 | 1 | Pick 57, 2020 national draft |
| Conor Stone | Greater Western Sydney | 18 years, 353 days | 4 | 5 | 3 | Pick 15, 2020 national draft |
| Josh Treacy | Fremantle | 18 years, 250 days | 4 | 15 | 13 | Pick 7, 2021 rookie draft |
| Finlay Macrae | Collingwood | 19 years, 34 days | 5 | 9 | 1 | Pick 19, 2020 national draft |
| Jordon Sweet | Western Bulldogs | 23 years, 74 days | 5 | 5 | 1 | Pick 23, 2018 national draft |
| Zach Reid | Essendon | 19 years, 46 days | 5 | 1 | 0 | Pick 10, 2020 national draft |
| Sam De Koning | Geelong | 20 years, 51 days | 5 | 1 | 0 | Pick 19, 2019 national draft |
| Riley Thilthorpe | Adelaide | 18 years, 292 days | 6 | 14 | 18 | Pick 2, 2020 national draft |
| Jay Rantall | Collingwood | 19 years, 319 days | 6 | 5 | 0 | Pick 40, 2019 national draft |
| Martin Frederick | Port Adelaide | 20 years, 343 days | 6 | 8 | 1 | 2018 Category B rookie selection, Next Generation Academy selection (South Sudanese) |
| Riley Collier-Dawkins | Richmond | 21 years, 86 days | 7 | 9 | 3 | Pick 20, 2018 national draft |
| Caleb Poulter | Collingwood | 18 years, 201 days | 7 | 11 | 2 | Pick 30, 2020 national draft |
| Emerson Jeka | Hawthorn | 19 years, 225 days | 7 | 4 | 2 | Pick 9, 2020 rookie draft |
| James Madden | Brisbane Lions | 21 years, 167 days | 7 | 9 | 1 | 2018 Category B rookie selection (Ireland) |
| Nick Bryan | Essendon | 19 years, 192 days | 7 | 1 | 0 | Pick 38, 2019 national draft |
| Buku Khamis | Western Bulldogs | 21 years, 46 days | 8 | 1 | 0 | 2018 Category B rookie selection, Next Generation Academy selection (South Sudanese) |
| Tom Wilson | Collingwood | 23 years, 335 days | 9 | 4 | 0 | 2019 Category B rookie selection (basketball) |
| Malcolm Rosas | Gold Coast | 19 years, 322 days | 9 | 4 | 0 | Pick 37, 2019 rookie draft |
| Hugo Ralphsmith | Richmond | 19 years, 187 days | 9 | 6 | 3 | Pick 46, 2019 national draft |
| Kieren Briggs | Greater Western Sydney | 21 years, 221 days | 9 | 5 | 2 | Pick 34, 2018 national draft |
| Ronin O'Connor | Adelaide | 20 years, 104 days | 9 | 3 | 0 | Pick 42, 2019 national draft |
| Ned Reeves | Hawthorn | 22 years, 203 days | 10 | 5 | 1 | 2018 Pre-season supplemental selection |
| Riley Garcia | Western Bulldogs | 20 years, 118 days | 11 | 9 | 4 | Pick 62, 2019 national draft |
| Trent Bianco | Collingwood | 20 years, 129 days | 11 | 12 | 7 | Pick 45, 2019 national draft |
| Callum Brown | Greater Western Sydney | 20 years, 287 days | 11 (unused substitute) | 2 | 2 | 2018 Category B rookie selection (Ireland) |
| Oscar Clavarino | St Kilda | 22 years, 7 days | 11 | 5 | 0 | Pick 35, 2017 national draft |
| Luke Edwards | West Coast | 19 years, 114 days | 12 | 8 | 0 | Pick 52, 2020 national draft |
| Jai Newcombe | Hawthorn | 19 years, 313 days | 13 | 7 | 1 | Pick 2, 2021 mid-season rookie draft |
| Brandon Walker | Fremantle | 18 years, 238 days | 13 | 10 | 0 | Pick 50, 2020 national draft |
| Joel Western | Fremantle | 18 years, 243 days | 13 | 4 | 0 | Pick 54, 2020 national draft |
| Josh Worrell | Adelaide | 20 years, 62 days | 13 | 1 | 0 | Pick 28, 2019 national draft |
| Lachlan Bramble | Hawthorn | 23 years, 62 days | 14 | 10 | 1 | 2020 Pre-season supplemental selection |
| Samson Ryan | Richmond | 20 years, 198 days | 15 | 1 | 0 | Pick 40, 2020 national draft |
| Leo Connolly | St Kilda | 19 years, 322 days | 15 | 7 | 1 | Pick 64, 2019 national draft |
| Dylan Williams | Port Adelaide | 19 years, 360 days | 15 | 1 | 0 | Pick 23, 2019 national draft |
| Denver Grainger-Barras | Hawthorn | 19 years, 71 days | 15 | 5 | 0 | Pick 6, 2020 national draft |
| Luke Pedlar | Adelaide | 19 years, 47 days | 16 | 2 | 0 | Pick 11, 2020 national draft |
| Eddie Ford | North Melbourne | 19 years, 13 days | 16 (unused substitute) | 5 | 3 | Pick 56, 2020 national draft |
| Jamarra Ugle-Hagan | Western Bulldogs | 19 years, 98 days | 17 | 5 | 7 | Pick 1, 2020 national draft |
| Jed McEntee | Port Adelaide | 20 years, 152 days | 18 | 1 | 0 | Pick 13, 2021 mid-season rookie draft |
| Sam Durham | Essendon | 20 years, 9 days | 18 | 7 | 1 | Pick 9, 2021 mid-season rookie draft |
| Connor West | West Coast | 20 years, 72 days | 18 | 5 | 1 | Pick 21, 2021 mid-season rookie draft |
| Jack Ginnivan | Collingwood | 18 years, 216 days | 19 | 5 | 6 | Pick 13, 2020 national draft |
| Anton Tohill | Collingwood | 21 years, 221 days | 19 | 1 | 0 | 2018 Category B rookie selection (Ireland) |
| Cooper Sharman | St Kilda | 20 years, 346 days | 19 (unused substitute) | 5 | 10 | Pick 21, 2021 mid-season rookie draft |
| Nathan Kreuger | Geelong | 22 years, 36 days | 20 | 2 | 0 | Trade, 2018 AFL draft |
| Jake Bowey | Melbourne | 18 years, 323 days | 20 | 7 | 0 | Pick 21, 2020 national draft |
| Joel Jeffrey | Gold Coast | 19 years, 142 days | 20 | 4 | 2 | 2020 Pre-draft selection |
| James Peatling | Greater Western Sydney | 20 years, 345 days | 20 | 4 | 0 | Pick 8, 2021 mid-season rookie draft |
| Maurice Rioli Jr | Richmond | 18 years, 340 days | 21 | 2 | 2 | Pick 51, 2020 national draft |
| Brayden Cook | Adelaide | 19 years, 20 days | 21 | 3 | 0 | Pick 25, 2020 national draft |
| Corey Durdin | Carlton | 19 years, 122 days | 22 | 2 | 1 | Pick 37, 2020 national draft |
| Brodie Kemp | Carlton | 20 years, 105 days | 22 | 2 | 0 | Pick 17, 2019 national draft |
| Charlie Comben | North Melbourne | 20 years, 25 days | 22 | 1 | 1 | Pick 31, 2019 national draft |
| Ben Miller | Richmond | 21 years, 355 days | 23 | 1 | 0 | Pick 63, 2017 national draft |
| Alex Davies | Gold Coast | 19 years, 156 days | 23 | 1 | 0 | 2020 Pre-draft selection |
| Lachlan Gollant | Adelaide | 19 years, 344 days | 23 | 1 | 1 | Pick 48, 2019 national draft |
| Phoenix Spicer | North Melbourne | 19 years, 204 days | 23 | 1 | 0 | Pick 42, 2020 national draft |

== Change of AFL club ==
| Name | Club | Age at debut | Debut round | Former clubs | Recruiting method |
|---|---|---|---|---|---|
| Lachie Fogarty | Carlton | 21 years, 351 days | 1 | Geelong | 2020 trade |
| Adam Saad | Carlton | 28 years, 238 days | 1 | Gold Coast, Essendon | 2020 trade |
| Oscar McDonald | Carlton | 25 years | 1 | Melbourne | 2020 Pre-season supplemental selection |
| Adam Treloar | Western Bulldogs | 28 years, 10 days | 1 | Greater Western Sydney, Collingwood | 2020 trade |
| Stefan Martin | Western Bulldogs | 34 years, 122 days | 1 | Melbourne, Brisbane Lions | 2020 trade |
| Mitch Hinge | Adelaide | 22 years, 267 days | 1 | Brisbane Lions | 2020 free agent |
| Shaun Higgins | Geelong | 33 years, 16 days | 1 | Western Bulldogs, North Melbourne | 2020 trade |
| Isaac Smith | Geelong | 32 years, 80 days | 1 | Hawthorn | 2020 free agent |
| Nick Hind | Essendon | 26 years, 213 days | 1 | St Kilda | 2020 trade |
| Peter Wright | Essendon | 24 years, 193 days | 1 | Gold Coast | 2020 trade |
| Jye Caldwell | Essendon | 20 years, 173 days | 1 | Greater Western Sydney | 2020 trade |
| Tom Phillips | Hawthorn | 24 years, 317 days | 1 | Collingwood | 2020 trade |
| Kyle Hartigan | Hawthorn | 29 years, 133 days | 1 | Adelaide | 2020 trade |
| Joe Daniher | Brisbane Lions | 27 years, 16 days | 1 | Essendon | 2020 free agent |
| Tom Hickey | Sydney | 30 years, 14 days | 1 | Gold Coast, St Kilda, West Coast | 2020 trade |
| Connor Menadue | North Melbourne | 24 years, 183 days | 1 | Richmond | Pick 18, 2021 rookie draft |
| Lachie Young | North Melbourne | 21 years, 349 days | 1 | Western Bulldogs | 2020 trade |
| Aidan Corr | North Melbourne | 26 years, 308 days | 1 | Greater Western Sydney | 2020 free agent |
| Jaidyn Stephenson | North Melbourne | 22 years, 65 days | 1 | Collingwood | 2020 trade |
| Aliir Aliir | Port Adelaide | 26 years, 197 days | 1 | Sydney | 2020 trade |
| Orazio Fantasia | Port Adelaide | 25 years, 188 days | 1 | Essendon | 2020 trade |
| Shaun McKernan | St Kilda | 30 years, 201 days | 1 | Adelaide, Essendon | 2020 free agent |
| Mason Wood | St Kilda | 27 years, 189 days | 1 | North Melbourne | 2020 Pre-season supplemental selection |
| Jack Higgins | St Kilda | 22 years, 2 days | 1 | Richmond | 2020 trade |
| Zac Langdon | West Coast | 25 years, 128 days | 1 | Greater Western Sydney | 2020 trade |
| Oleg Markov | Gold Coast | 24 years, 317 days | 1 | Richmond | 2020 trade |
| Zac Williams | Carlton | 26 years, 186 days | 2 | Greater Western Sydney | 2020 free agent |
| Brad Crouch | St Kilda | 27 years, 79 days | 3 | Adelaide | 2020 free agent |
| Alex Witherden | West Coast | 22 years, 218 days | 5 | Brisbane Lions | 2020 trade |
| Atu Bosenavulagi | North Melbourne | 20 years, 213 days | 5 | Collingwood | 2020 trade |
| Jeremy Cameron | Geelong | 28 years, 23 days | 6 | Greater Western Sydney | 2020 trade |
| Jackson Hately | Adelaide | 20 years, 186 days | 6 | Greater Western Sydney | Pick 1, 2021 pre-season draft |
| Mitch Hannan | Western Bulldogs | 27 years, 52 days | 7 | Melbourne | 2020 trade |
| Jesse Hogan | Greater Western Sydney | 26 years, 78 days | 7 | Melbourne & Fremantle | 2020 trade |
| Ben Brown | Melbourne | 28 years, 163 days | 7 | North Melbourne | 2020 trade |
| James Frawley | St Kilda | 32 years, 236 days | 9 | Melbourne & Hawthorn | 2020 free agent |
| Rory Atkins | Gold Coast | 26 years, 307 days | 9 | Adelaide | 2020 free agent |
| Matthew Parker | Richmond | 25 years, 172 days | 18 | St Kilda | Pick 10, 2021 mid-season rookie draft |
| Nakia Cockatoo | Brisbane Lions | 24 years, 274 days | 19 | Geelong | 2020 trade |
| Jacob Townsend | Gold Coast | 28 years, 48 days | 21 | Greater Western Sydney, Richmond & Essendon | Pick 5, 2021 rookie draft |

== See also ==
- List of AFL Women's debuts in 2021
