= Cassie Davidson =

Australian rules footballer (born 1996)

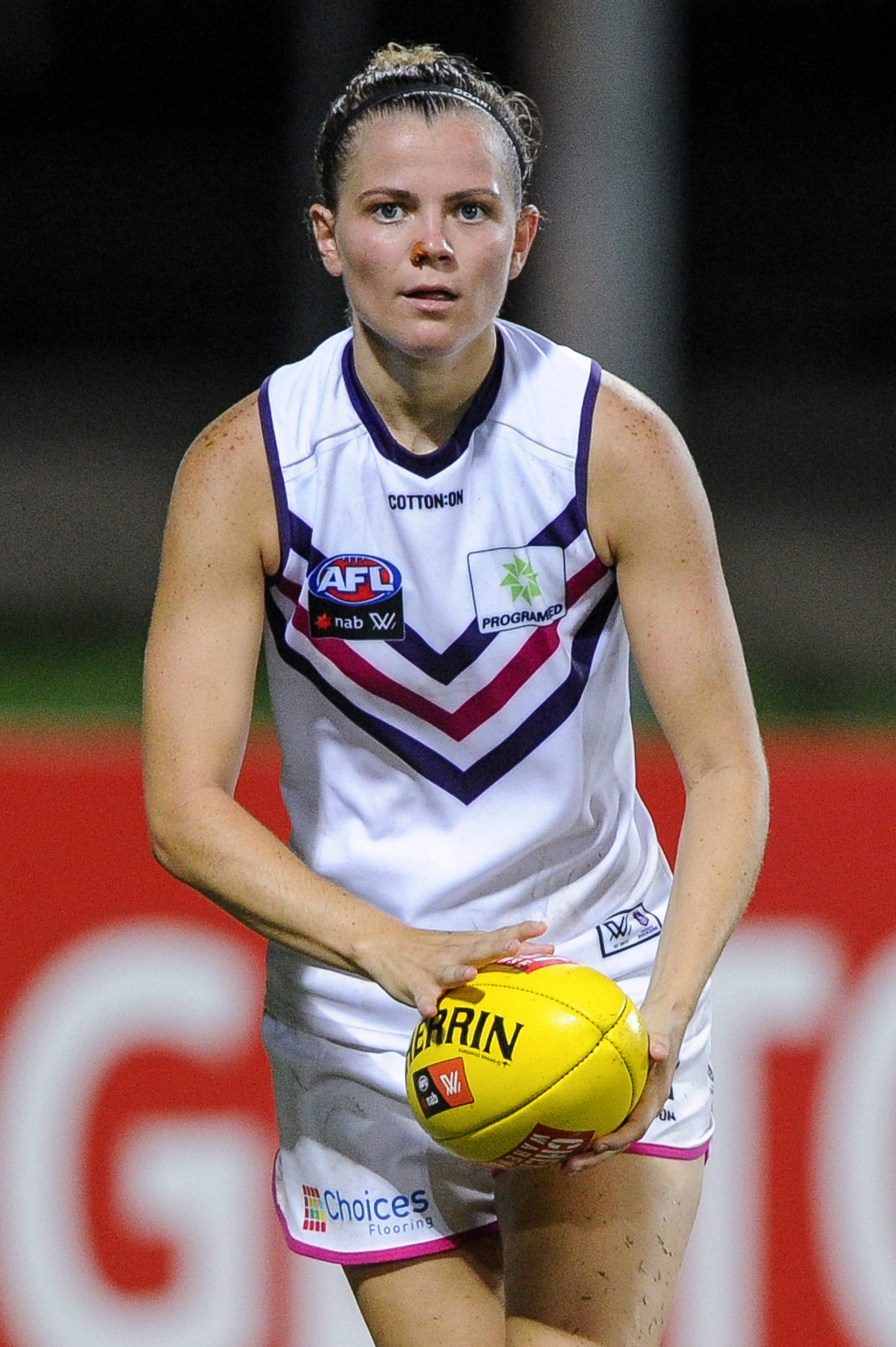
- Davidson playing for Fremantle in January 2018

Personal information
- Born: 6 October 1996 (age 30)
- Original team: East Fremantle (WAWFL)
- Draft: No. 84, 2016 AFL Women's draft
- Debut: Round 1, 2017, Fremantle vs. Western Bulldogs, at VU Whitten Oval
- Height: 166 cm (5 ft 5 in)
- Position: Midfielder

Playing career^{1}
Years	Club	Games (Goals)
2017–2019	Fremantle	14 (0)
2020	West Coast	3 (0)
Total		17 (0)
- ^{1} Playing statistics correct to the end of the 2020 season.

Cassie Davidson (born 6 October 1996) is an Australian rules footballer playing for West Coast in the AFL Women's competition. Davidson was drafted by Fremantle with their eleventh selection and eighty-fourth overall in the 2016 AFL Women's draft. She made her debut in the thirty-two point loss to the Western Bulldogs at VU Whitten Oval in the opening round of the 2017 season. She played every match in her debut season to finish with seven matches.

In April 2019, Davidson was traded to expansion club West Coast. In August 2020, Davidson was delisted by West Coast.
