= Tarnee Tester =

Female Australian rules footballer

Personal information
- Full name: Tarnee Tester
- Born: 22 January 1993 (age 33); Broken Hill
- Original team: Subiaco (WAWFL)
- Draft: No. 56, 2019 national draft
- Debut: Round 1, 2020, West Coast vs. Collingwood, at Victoria Park
- Height: 159 cm (5 ft 3 in)
- Position: Forward

Playing career^{1}
Years	Club	Games (Goals)
2020	West Coast	4 (1)
2021	Fremantle	0 (0)
Total		4 (1)
- ^{1} Playing statistics correct to the end of the 2021 season.

Tarnee Tester (born 22 January 1993) is an Australian rules footballer who played for West Coast and Fremantle in the AFL Women's (AFLW).

== Early life ==
Tester was born and raised in Broken Hill of indigenous Barkindji heritage. Tester began playing football in 2012 with West Broken Hill. Tester moved to Perth to pursue a career in the AFLW.

== AFLW career ==
=== West Coast ===
In August 2020, Tester was delisted by West Coast.

=== Fremantle ===
In August 2020, Tester was signed by Fremantle in the delisted free agency period. Following the 2021 season, she was delisted by Fremantle.
