= Emily Bonser =

Australian rules footballer

Personal information
- Full name: Emily Bonser
- Born: 27 October 1995 (age 31)
- Original team: Claremont (WAWFL)
- Draft: Pre-list signing, 2019 national draft
- Debut: Round 3, 2020, West Coast vs. Greater Western Sydney, at Blacktown ISP Oval
- Height: 163 cm (5 ft 4 in)
- Position: Midfielder

Playing career^{1}
Years	Club	Games (Goals)
2020	West Coast	3 (0)
- ^{1} Playing statistics correct to the end of the 2020 season.

Emily Bonser (born 27 October 1995) is a retired Australian rules footballer who played for West Coast in the AFL Women's (AFLW).

== AFLW career ==
Bonser joined West Coast for their inaugural season. At the end of the season, Bonser retired from football for personal reasons.
