= Aimee Schmidt =

Australian rules footballer

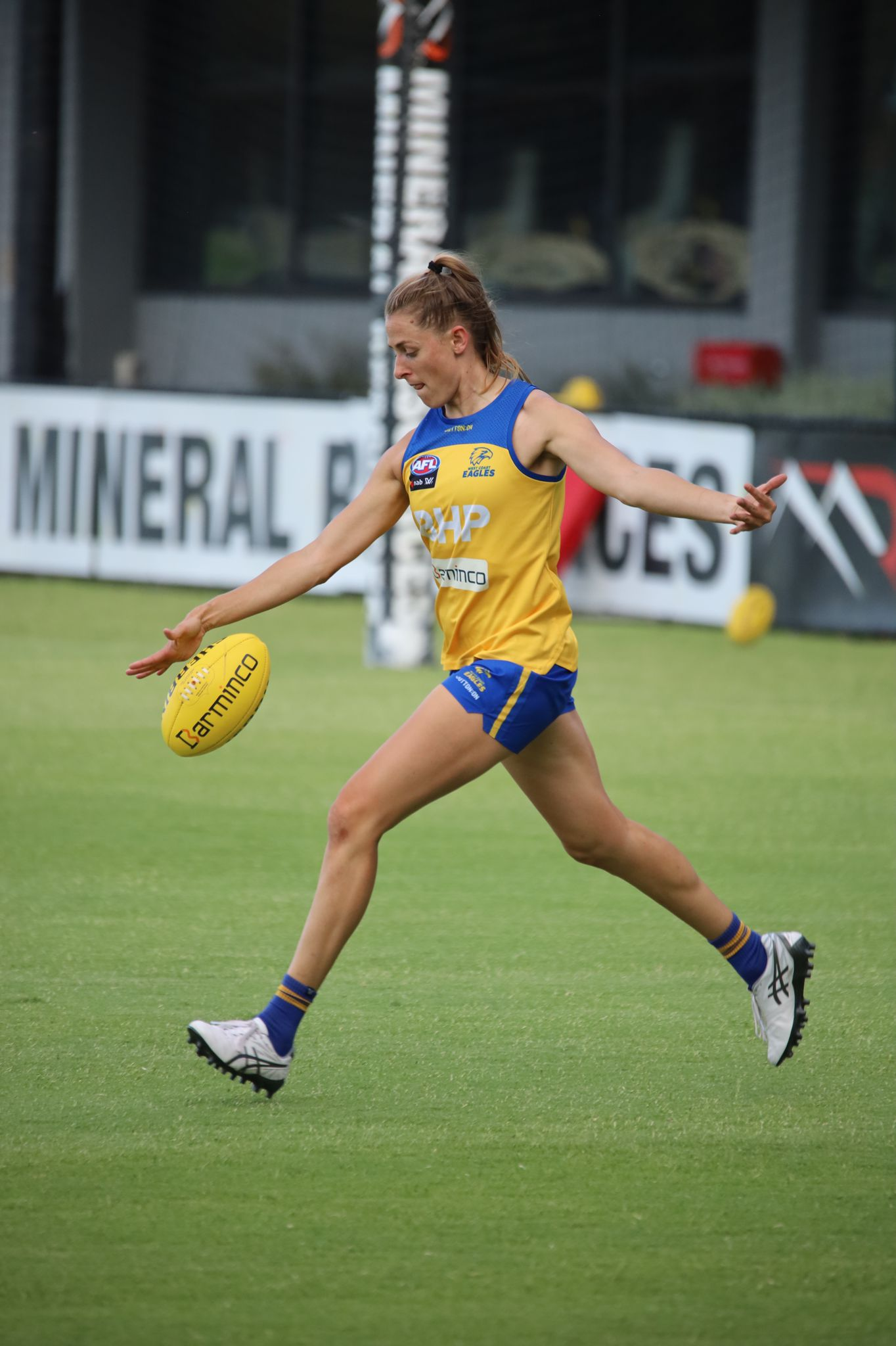
- Aimee Schmidt at training in 2021

Personal information
- Born: 16 April 1993 (age 33)
- Original team: Coastal Titans (WAWFL)
- Draft: No. 17, 2016 AFL Women's draft
- Debut: Round 1, 2017, Greater Western Sydney vs. Adelaide, at Thebarton Oval
- Height: 173 cm (5 ft 8 in)
- Position: Forward / ruck

Playing career^{1}
Years	Club	Games (Goals)
2017–2021	Greater Western Sydney	23 (10)
2022–	West Coast	26 (13)
Total		49 (23)
- ^{1} Playing statistics correct to the end of the 2023 season.

Career highlights
- 2× West Coast leading goalkicker: 2022 (S6), 2022 (S7)

Aimee Schmidt (born 16 April 1993) is an Australian rules footballer who played for West Coast and Greater Western Sydney in the AFL Women's (AFLW) competition.

== AFLW career ==
Schmidt was drafted by Greater Western Sydney with their third selection and seventeenth overall in the 2016 AFL Women's draft. She made her debut in the thirty-six point loss to Adelaide at Thebarton Oval in the opening round of the 2017 season. She played every match in her debut season to finish with seven games.

Schmidt left Greater Western Sydney in June 2021 and joined West Coast as a free agent. She made her debut for West Coast in round 1 of the 2022 season, against Fremantle. Schmidt retired at the end of the 2023 AFL Women's season.
