= Lauren Gauci =

Australian rules football player (born 1996)

Personal information
- Born: 8 April 1996 (age 30)
- Original teams: North Adelaide, (SANFLW)
- Draft: Undrafted free agent
- Debut: 21 February 2021, West Coast vs. Greater Western Sydney, at Blacktown ISP Oval
- Height: 171 cm (5 ft 7 in)
- Position: Medium defender

Playing career^{1}
Years	Club	Games (Goals)
2021–2022	West Coast	8 (0)
- ^{1} Playing statistics correct to the end of the 2022 season.

Lauren Gauci (born 8 April 1996) is an Australian rules footballer. She was selected by the West Coast Eagles as an undrafted free agent following the 2020 AFL Women's draft, and made her AFL Women's debut in round 4 of the 2021 AFL Women's season.

== Career ==
Before playing for West Coast, she played for North Adelaide in the SANFLW, including playing in the team's 2020 SANFLW premiership.

She nominated for the 2020 AFL Women's draft, and was selected by the West Coast Eagles as an undrafted free agent. Players that are not drafted from their nominated state by the end of the draft can be approached and signed by clubs outside of their state as undrafted free agents, as long as those clubs have room on their team.

Gauci missed the first three matches of the 2021 season due to a knee injury. She made her AFL Women's debut in round 4 of that season, on 21 February, playing against Greater Western Sydney at Blacktown ISP Oval. Gauci was one of three former North Adelaide players making their debut in 2021 for West Coast. She continued through the season to play all five of the remaining matches.

In May 2022, Gauci was delisted by West Coast.
