= Beatrice Devlyn =

Australian rules footballer

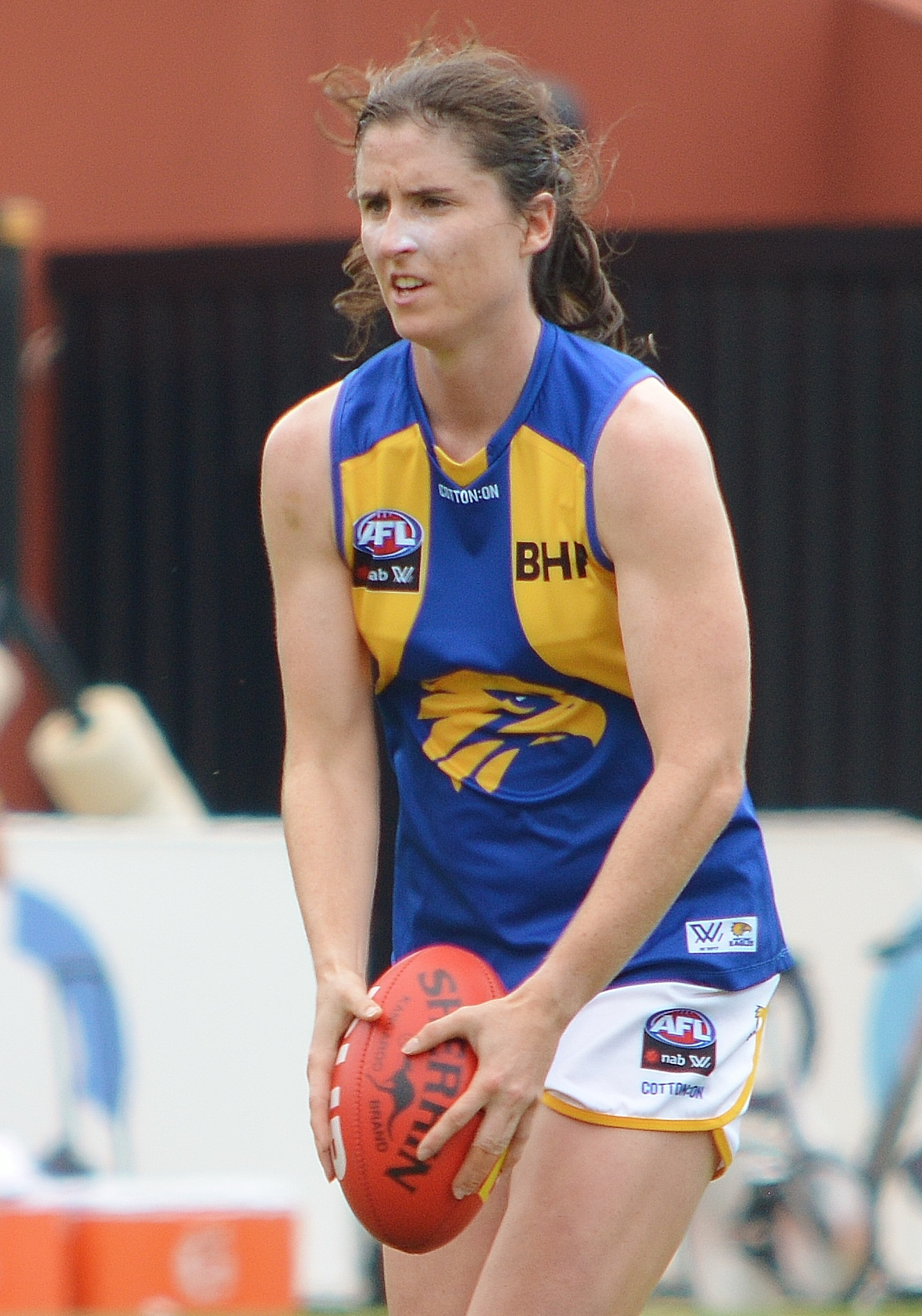
- Devlyn with West Coast in January 2020

Personal information
- Born: 8 February 1998 (age 28)
- Original team: South Fremantle (WAWFL)
- Debut: Round 4, 2017, Fremantle vs. Adelaide, at Fremantle Oval
- Height: 178 cm (5 ft 10 in)
- Position: Forward

Playing career^{1}
Years	Club	Games (Goals)
2017–2018	Fremantle	2 (0)
2020–2021	West Coast	6 (0)
Total		8 (0)
- ^{1} Playing statistics correct to the end of the 2021 season.

Beatrice Devlyn (born 8 February 1998) is an Australian rules footballer who played for the Fremantle Football Club in the AFL Women's competition. Devlyn was recruited by Fremantle as an injury replacement player in January 2017. She made her debut in the twenty-three point loss to Adelaide at Fremantle Oval in round four of the 2017 season. She played the next week before she was omitted for the round six match against Carlton to finish with two matches for the season. She was delisted at the end of the 2017 season. She was subsequently re-drafted as a rookie by Fremantle with pick No. 16 in the 2017 rookie draft.

Devlyn sustained a finger injury in a practice match before the beginning of the 2018 AFL Women's season. Surgery to repair the finger was successful with a four-to-six week timetable placed on her recovery. She was delisted by Fremantle at the end of the 2018 season after rupturing her left ACL in a training session. Devlyn was signed in July 2019 to the West coast Eagles AFLW team as an academy signing for the club's inaugural season in 2020 having fully recovered from her knee injury. Devlyn was delisted by the Eagles on 9 June 2021, after playing 6 games with the team throughout her career.

She currently works as a strength and conditioning coach at a private gym and for Subiaco's women's team in the WAFLW.
