= Luke Dwyer =

Personal information
- Full name: Luke Dwyer
- Born: 9 January 1978 (age 48)

Playing career
Years	Club	Games (Goals)
1997–1999	East Perth	40 (14)
2000–2007	Claremont	105 (31)
Total		145 (45)

Coaching career^{3}
Years	Club	Games (W–L–D)
2020	West Coast (W)	6 (1–5–0)
- ^{3} Coaching statistics correct as of 2020.

Luke Dwyer (born 9 January 1978) is a former Australian rules football player and coach. He was the inaugural coach of the West Coast Eagles in the AFL Women's (AFLW).

He began his football career in 1997 with East Perth in the Westar Rules competition (now known as the West Australian Football League (WAFL)). In his three years at the club, he kicked 14 goals across 40 games. Dwyer began representing Claremont from 2000; his eight-year stint extended until 2007, in which he played 105 matches and scored 31 goals. After finishing his playing career, he began teaching physical education at Christ Church Grammar School, before a five-year coaching stretch at University Football Club, in which he led the amateur team to four premierships.

In late 2015, West Coast offered Dwyer an opportunity to coach East Perth (the club's WAFL affiliate at the time). After a season, Dwyer became a full-time development coach, later moving to the club's women's program. He was announced as West Coast's inaugural AFLW coach in late 2018. In September 2020, Dwyer stepped down from the role after only one season in which West Coast won a single game and finished bottom of the conference ladder.
