= Courtney Guard =

Australian footballer

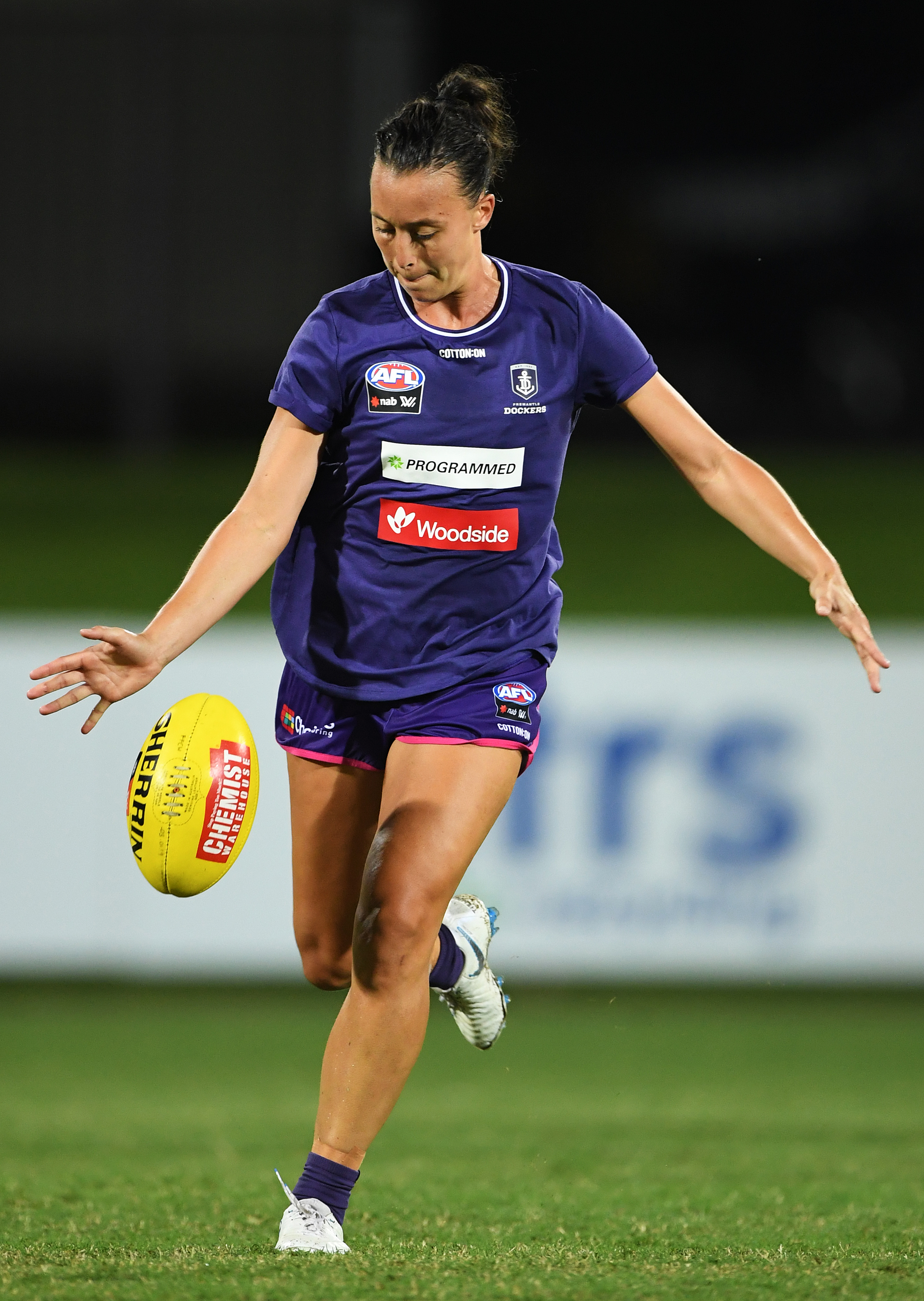

Personal information
- Nickname: Stubbsy
- Born: 26 September 1991 (age 35)
- Original team: Subiaco (WAWFL)
- Draft: No. 39, 2018 AFL Women's draft
- Debut: Round 4, 2019, Fremantle vs. Adelaide, at Marrara Oval
- Height: 168 cm (5 ft 6 in)

Playing career^{1}
Years	Club	Games (Goals)
2019	Fremantle	1 (0)
2020–2022 (S6)	West Coast	21 (0)
Total		22 (0)
- ^{1} Playing statistics correct to the end of 2022 season 6.

Courtney Guard (née Stubbs, born 26 September 1991) is a retired Australian rules footballer who played for Fremantle and West Coast in the AFL Women's (AFLW).

Guard was drafted by Fremantle with their fourth selection and thirty-ninth overall in the 2018 AFL Women's draft. She only played one game for Fremantle, in a loss to Adelaide in Darwin in the fourth round of the 2019 season.

At the end of the 2019 season, Guard was recruited by West Coast for their inaugural season in 2020.

In May 2022, Guard retired to focus on her career and new role as Head of Sport at Perth College.

A school teacher, Guard was previously a 100m hurdler and basketball player.
