= Melissa Caulfield =

Australian rules footballer (born 1988)

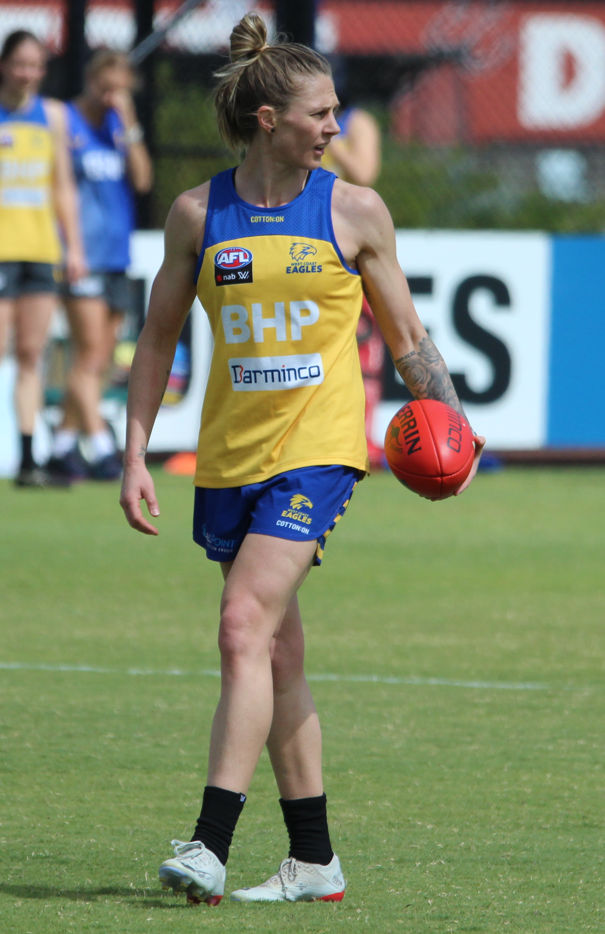
- Melissa Caulfield training with West Coast in 2021

Personal information
- Born: 29 May 1988 (age 38)
- Original team: East Fremantle (WAWFL)
- Draft: No. 77, 2016 AFL Women's draft
- Debut: Round 1, 2017, Fremantle vs. Western Bulldogs, at VU Whitten Oval
- Height: 167 cm (5 ft 6 in)
- Position: Midfielder / forward

Playing career^{1}
Years	Club	Games (Goals)
2017–2019	Fremantle	20 (5)
2020–2022 (S6)	West Coast	13 (3)
Total		33 (8)
- ^{1} Playing statistics correct to the end of 2022 season 6.

Melissa Caulfield (born 29 May 1988) is a retired Australian rules footballer who played for Fremantle and West Coast in the AFL Women's competition. Caulfield was drafted by Fremantle with their tenth selection and seventy-seventh overall in the 2016 AFL Women's draft. She made her debut in the thirty-two point loss to the Western Bulldogs at VU Whitten Oval in the opening round of the 2017 season. She played the first two matches of the year before missing the round three match against Greater Western Sydney. She returned for the round four match against Adelaide and played every match for the remainder of the year apart from the last round of the season, and finished with five matches. In March 2022, Caulfield retired to focus on work and travel.
