= Imahra Cameron =

Australian rules footballer (born 1997)

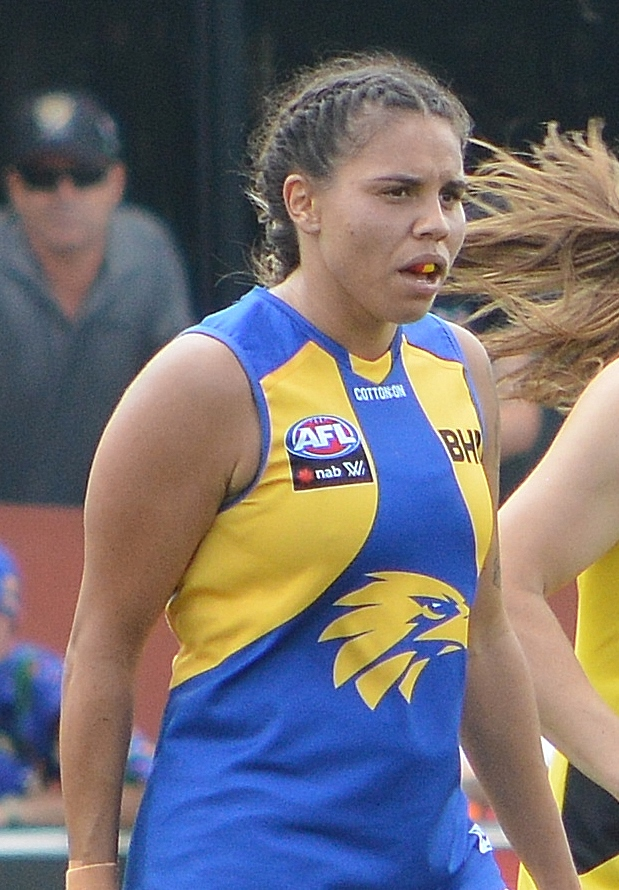
- Cameron with West Coast in 2020

Personal information
- Born: 9 January 1997 (age 29)
- Original team: South Fremantle (WAWFL)
- Draft: No. 19, 2019 national draft
- Debut: Round 1, 2020, West Coast vs. Collingwood, at Victoria Park
- Height: 164 cm (5 ft 5 in)
- Position: Midfielder/forward

Playing career^{1}
Years	Club	Games (Goals)
2020–S7 (2022)	West Coast	23 (10)
- ^{1} Playing statistics correct to the end of the S7 (2022) season.

Imahra Cameron (born 9 January 1997) is an Australian rules footballer who played for West Coast in the AFL Women's (AFLW). Throughout her career, she has taken on a mixture of forward and midfield roles. She was West Coast's first female draftee, debuting in the club's inaugural AFLW team in the opening round of the 2020 season.

Cameron played junior football for Kelmscott before moving to the West Australian Women's Football League (WAWFL), where she represented South Fremantle and the Perth Angels. For 2019, the WAWFL was superseded by the WAFL Women's; Cameron joined the Swan Districts and reached the inaugural grand final with the club. In October that year, she was recruited by West Coast with pick 19 in the AFLW national draft. Adam Selwood, the club's head of women's football, cited her "X-factor" and explosiveness.

In November 2022, Cameron was delisted by West Coast.

Cameron, an Indigenous Australian, is a mentor for Deadly Sista Girlz, a program aiming to improve young Aboriginal and Torres Strait Islander women's health choices by presenting strong female role models.
