= Mhicca Carter =

Australian rules footballer

- Born: 23 March 1990 (age 36) New Zealand
- Height: 163 cm (5 ft 4 in)

Rugby union career
Super Rugby
Years	Team	Apps	(Points)
	RugbyWA		(0)
International career
Years	Team	Apps	(Points)
2018–	Australia		(0)
Australian rules football career
Personal information
- Draft: 2019 rookie signing
- Debut: Round 6, 2020, West Coast vs. Gold Coast, at Mineral Resources Park
- Position: Defender
Playing career^{1}
Years	Club	Games (Goals)
2020–2021	West Coast	1 (0)
- ^{1} Playing statistics correct to the end of the 2021 season.

Mhicca Carter (born 23 March 1990) is an Australian athlete who plays Australian rules football and rugby union.

== Biography ==
Carter played age-group basketball and touch football for New Zealand. She also played a bit of club rugby in Marlborough. In 2011, Carter moved from New Zealand to Australia at the age of 20.

=== Rugby career ===
Carter played women's rugby union domestically for RugbyWA in the Super W and internationally for the Wallaroos. She made her test debut for the Wallaroos in 2018.

=== Aussie rules career ===
Carter switched sports and played Aussie rules for the West Coast Eagles in the 2019 AFL Women's season. She was delisted by the Eagles on 9 June 2021, after playing 1 game with the team throughout her career.
