= Chantella Perera =

Australian rules footballer and basketball player (born 1986)

Personal information
- Full name: Chantella Mary Perera
- Born: 7 June 1986 (age 40)
- Original team: Hawthorn (VFLW)
- Draft: No. 101, 2019 national draft
- Debut: Round 1, 2020, West Coast vs. Collingwood, at Victoria Park
- Height: 174 cm (5 ft 9 in)
- Position: Defender

Playing career^{1}
Years	Club	Games (Goals)
2020–2021	West Coast	13 (0)
- ^{1} Playing statistics correct to the end of the 2021 season.

Chantella Mary Perera (born 7 June 1986) is an Australian rules footballer who played for West Coast in the AFL Women's (AFLW).

== AFLW career ==
In June 2021, Perera was delisted by West Coast.
