= Amber Ward =

Australian rules football player

Personal information
- Full name: Amber Ward
- Born: 12 October 2001 (age 25)
- Original teams: North Adelaide, (SANFLW)
- Draft: Undrafted free agent
- Debut: 30 January 2021, West Coast vs. Adelaide, at Lathlain Park
- Height: 176 cm (5 ft 9 in)
- Position: Medium defender

Club information
- Current club: Adelaide
- Number: 3

Playing career^{1}
Years	Club	Games (Goals)
2021–2022	West Coast	14 (0)
S7 (2022)–	Adelaide	4 (0)
Total		18 (0)
- ^{1} Playing statistics correct to the end of the S7 (2022) season.

Amber Ward (born 12 October 2001) is an Australian rules footballer playing for Adelaide. She was selected by the West Coast Eagles as an undrafted free agent following the 2020 AFL Women's draft, and made her AFL Women's debut in round 1 of the 2021 AFL Women's season.

== Career ==
Ward formerly played soccer, only beginning to play Australian rules football three years before being signed with West Coast in 2020.

She represented South Australia in the 2018 AFL Women's Under 18 Championships, and the Central Allies (South Australian and the Northern Territory) in the 2019 AFL Women's Under 18 Championships.

In the SANFLW, Ward played for North Adelaide Football Club. She nominated for the 2019 AFL Women's draft, but wasn't picked. She nominated again for the 2020 AFL Women's draft, and was selected by the West Coast Eagles as an undrafted free agent. Players that are not drafted from their nominated state by the end of the draft can be approached and signed by clubs outside of their state as undrafted free agents, as long as those clubs have room on their team.

She made her AFL Women's debut in the first round of the 2021 AFL Women's season, on 30 January 2021, playing against Adelaide. Ward was one of three former North Adelaide players making their debut in 2021 for West Coast. She continued through the season to play all nine matches.

In June 2022, she was traded to Adelaide.
