= Shanae Davison =

Australian rules football player

Personal information
- Born: 18 August 2001 (age 25); Perth, Western Australia, Australia
- Original teams: Swan Districts, (WAFLW)
- Draft: No. 18, 2020 AFL Women's draft
- Debut: 30 January 2021, West Coast vs. Adelaide, at Lathlain Park
- Height: 167 cm (5 ft 6 in)
- Position: Medium forward

Club information
- Current club: Brisbane

Playing career^{1}
| Years | Club | Games (Goals) |
| 2021–2023 | West Coast | 18 (1) |
| 2024– | Brisbane | 0 (0) |
| Total | | 18 (1) |
- ^{1} Playing statistics correct to the end of the 2023 season.

Shanae Davison is an Australian rules footballer who plays for Brisbane in the AFL Women's (AFLW). She has previously played for West Coast.

== Early life ==
Davison was born in Perth, Western Australia on 18 August 2001, but moved to Broome, in the state's north, at a young age. She lived there for 10 years, throughout all of primary school, before moving back to Perth for high school. At first, she played basketball, but she started playing football at the Noranda Hawks in 2018. Growing up, she was a Geelong supporter.

== Football career ==
In 2019, she started playing for the Swan Districts WAFLW team. That year, during a match against Claremont, she took a spectacular mark, which was a contender for WAFLW Mark of the Year.

Davison was selected by the West Coast Eagles with pick number 18 in the 2020 AFL Women's draft. She was one of six West Coast Eagles AFLW players to debut for the first round of the 2021 season, on 30 January. She played a further four matches that season before injuring her hamstring.

Following the 2023 season, she was traded to Brisbane alongside teammate Eleanor Hartill.
