= Parris Laurie =

Australian rules footballer (born 1994)

Personal information
- Full name: Parris Laurie
- Born: 9 December 1994 (age 31); Denmark, Western Australia
- Original team: Claremont (WAWFL)
- Draft: No. 50, 2018 AFL Women's draft
- Debut: Round 1, 2019, Fremantle vs. Melbourne, at Casey Fields
- Height: 178 cm (5 ft 10 in)
- Position: Ruck

Playing career^{1}
Years	Club	Games (Goals)
2019	Fremantle	8 (0)
2020–2022	West Coast	25 (1)
Total		33 (1)
- ^{1} Playing statistics correct to the end of the 2022 season.

Parris Laurie (born 9 December 1994) is a retired Australian rules footballer who played for Fremantle and West Coast in the AFL Women's (AFLW).

== AFLW career ==
Laurie was drafted by Fremantle with their fifth selection and fiftieth overall in the 2018 AFL Women's draft. She made her debut in the four point win against Melbourne at Casey Fields in the opening round of the 2019 season.

In April 2019, Laurie joined crosstown rivals West Coast for their inaugural season.

In June 2022, Laurie retired from AFLW football.

In February 2021, Laurie joined the Wembley Magpies AFC as the coach of their Women's League side, in C1 League of PFL. After winning the 2022 C1 flag and 2022 B Grade flag as coach, Laurie returned as a player for 2023, as player coach in A Grade; where she won the Best Player of the Grand Final Medal and the League Best & Fairest Medal as the team won the A Grade flag.

For 2024, Laurie stepped down as coach, remaining as the A Grade Captain, as Wembley collected their fourth consecutive Women's League flag, again in A Grade. 2024 also saw Laurie collect her second Best Player of the Grand Final Medal and second the League Best & Fairest Medal.

== Personal life ==
Her brother Jesse Laurie played football for Claremont in the West Australian Football League and was drafted by Port Adelaide in the 2009 AFL rookie draft, but never played a senior game in the Australian Football League.

As at August 2025, Laurie has been in a long term relationship with Nick Jefferies, an ex-President of Wembley AFC and current player.
