= Tayla Bresland =

Australian rules footballer

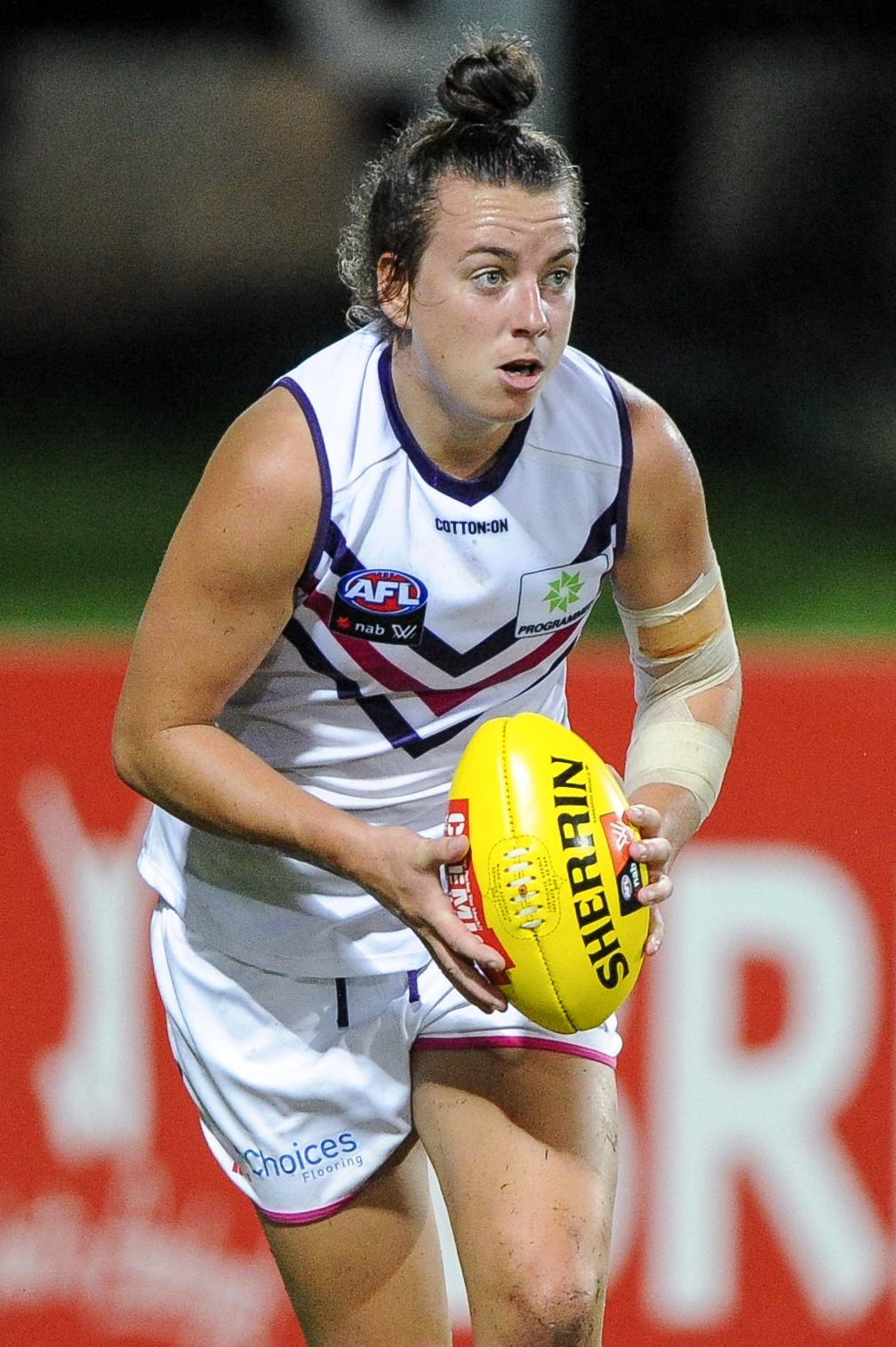
- Bresland playing for Fremantle in January 2018

Personal information
- Born: 4 February 1996 (age 30)
- Original team: Peel Thunder (WAWFL)
- Draft: No. 52, 2016 AFL Women's draft
- Debut: Round 1, 2017, Fremantle vs. Western Bulldogs, at VU Whitten Oval
- Height: 172 cm (5 ft 8 in)
- Position: Defender

Playing career^{1}
Years	Club	Games (Goals)
2017–2020	Fremantle	17 (1)
2021–2022 (S6)	West Coast	8 (0)
Total		25 (1)
- ^{1} Playing statistics correct to the end of 2022 season 6.

Tayla Bresland (born 4 February 1996) is a retired Australian rules footballer who played for Fremantle and West Coast in the AFL Women's (AFLW) competition.

== AFLW career ==
=== Fremantle ===
Bresland was drafted by Fremantle with their seventh selection and fifty-second overall in the 2016 AFL Women's draft. She made her debut in the thirty-two point loss to the Western Bulldogs at VU Whitten Oval in the opening round of the 2017 season. She played every match in her debut season to finish with seven matches.

=== West Coast ===
In August 2020, Bresland was traded to West Coast for the 46th pick of the 2020 AFL Women's draft. In March 2022, Bresland retired to focus on her career as a carpenter and Air Force Reservist.
