= Kate Orme =

Female Australian rules footballer (born 1989)

Personal information
- Full name: Katherine Orme
- Born: 14 April 1989 (age 37)
- Original team: Claremont (WAWFL)
- Draft: No. 70, 2019 national draft
- Debut: Round 2, 2020, West Coast vs. Fremantle, at Optus Stadium
- Height: 165 cm (5 ft 5 in)
- Position: Midfielder

Playing career^{1}
Years	Club	Games (Goals)
2020–2021	West Coast	7 (1)
- ^{1} Playing statistics correct to the end of the 2021 season.

Katherine "Kate" Orme (born 14 April 1989) is a former Australian rules footballer who played for West Coast in the AFL Women's (AFLW). When she was drafted to the West Coast Eagles, she had been working for the team as digital and social media producer for five years and was captain of Claremont Football Club women's team. Orme was delisted by the Eagles on 9 June 2021, after playing 7 games with the team throughout her two-year career.

Orme is an ambassador for the National Asthma Council of Australia and for Asthma WA.
