= Hayley Bullas =

Australian rules footballer

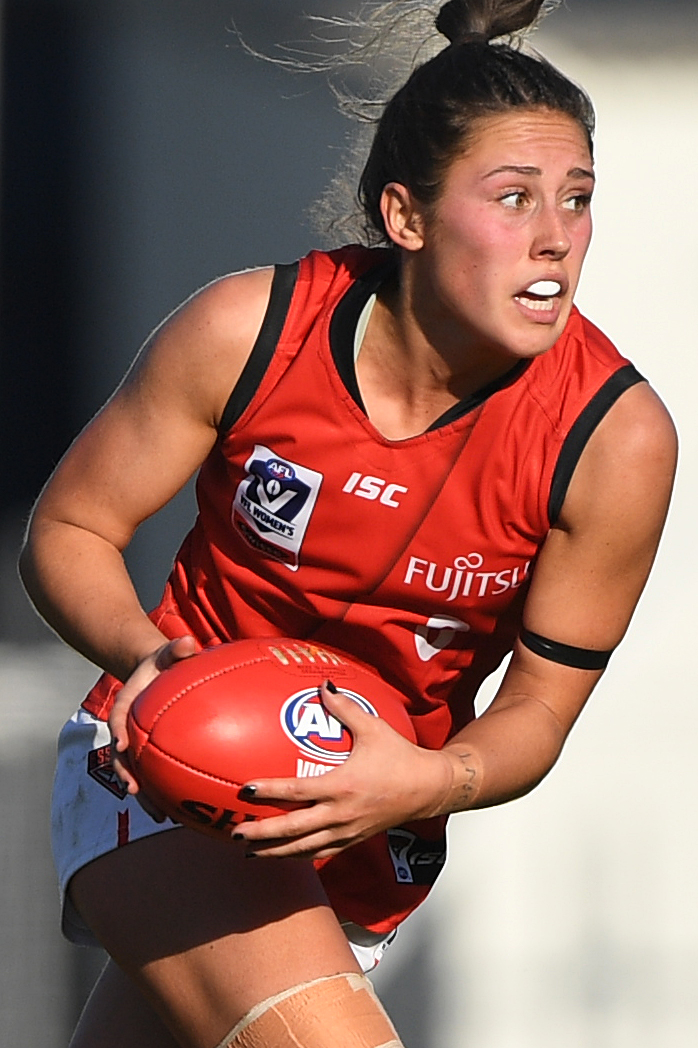
- Bullas playing for Essendon's VFLW team in June 2019

Personal information
- Born: 23 September 1996 (age 30)
- Original team: Essendon (VFLW)
- Debut: Round 1, 2020, West Coast vs. Collingwood, at Victoria Park
- Height: 164 cm (5 ft 5 in)

Club information
- Current club: Sydney

Playing career^{1}
Years	Club	Games (Goals)
2020–S7 (2022)	West Coast	30 (5)
2023–2024	Sydney	7 (0)
Total		37 (5)
- ^{1} Playing statistics correct to the end of the 2024 season.

Career highlights
- West Coast leading goalkicker: 2020

Hayley Bullas (born 23 September 1996) is a former Australian rules footballer who played for Sydney and West Coast in the AFL Women's (AFLW).

== AFLW career ==
Bullas signed with West Coast during the first period of the 2019 expansion club signing period in August. She made her debut against Collingwood at Victoria Park in the opening round of the 2020 season.

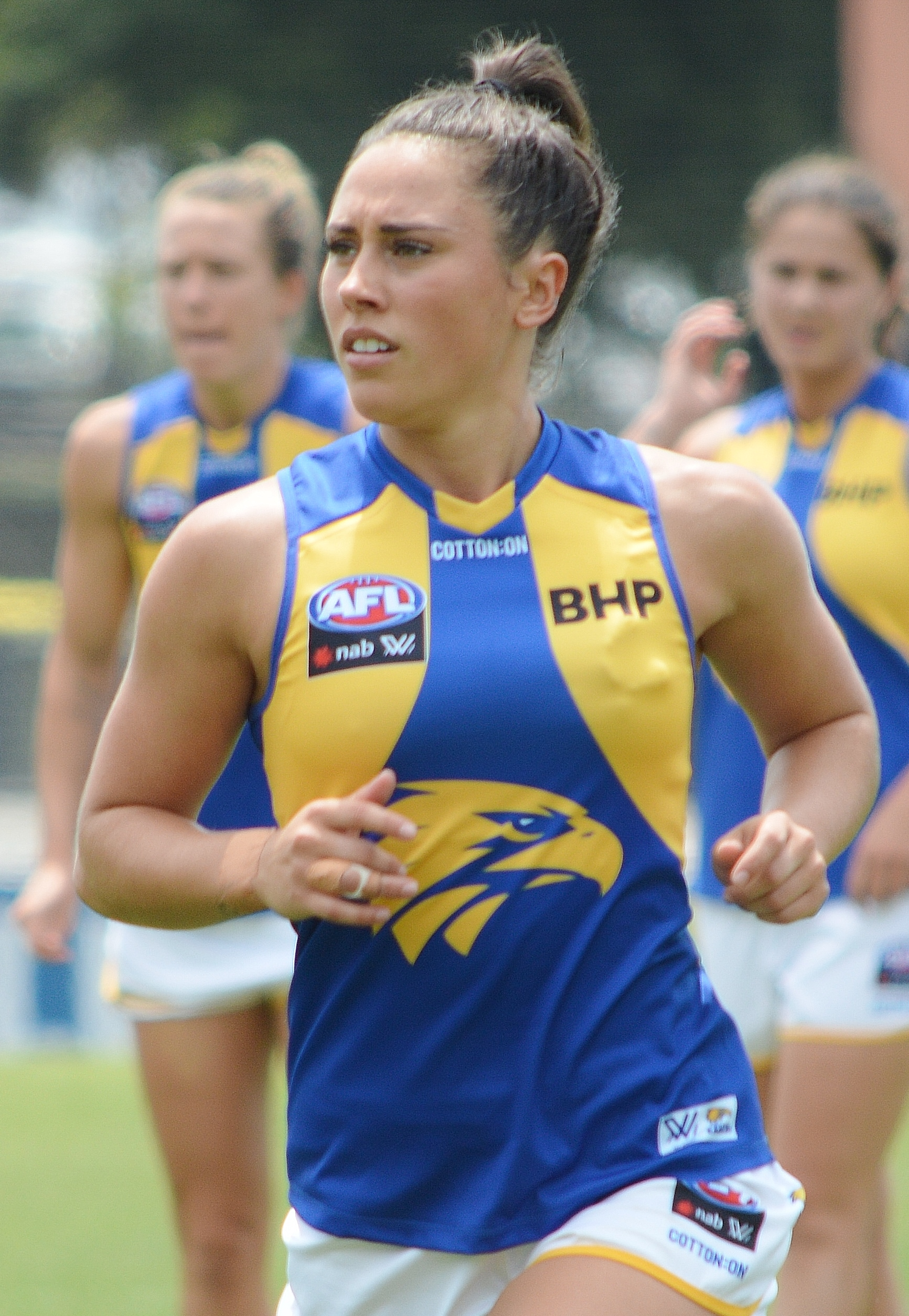
Bullas with West Coast in January 2020

In November 2022, Bullas was delisted by West Coast.

In March 2023, Bullas was signed by Sydney as a delisted free agent.
