= Andrea Gilmore =

Australian netball player and Australian rules footballer

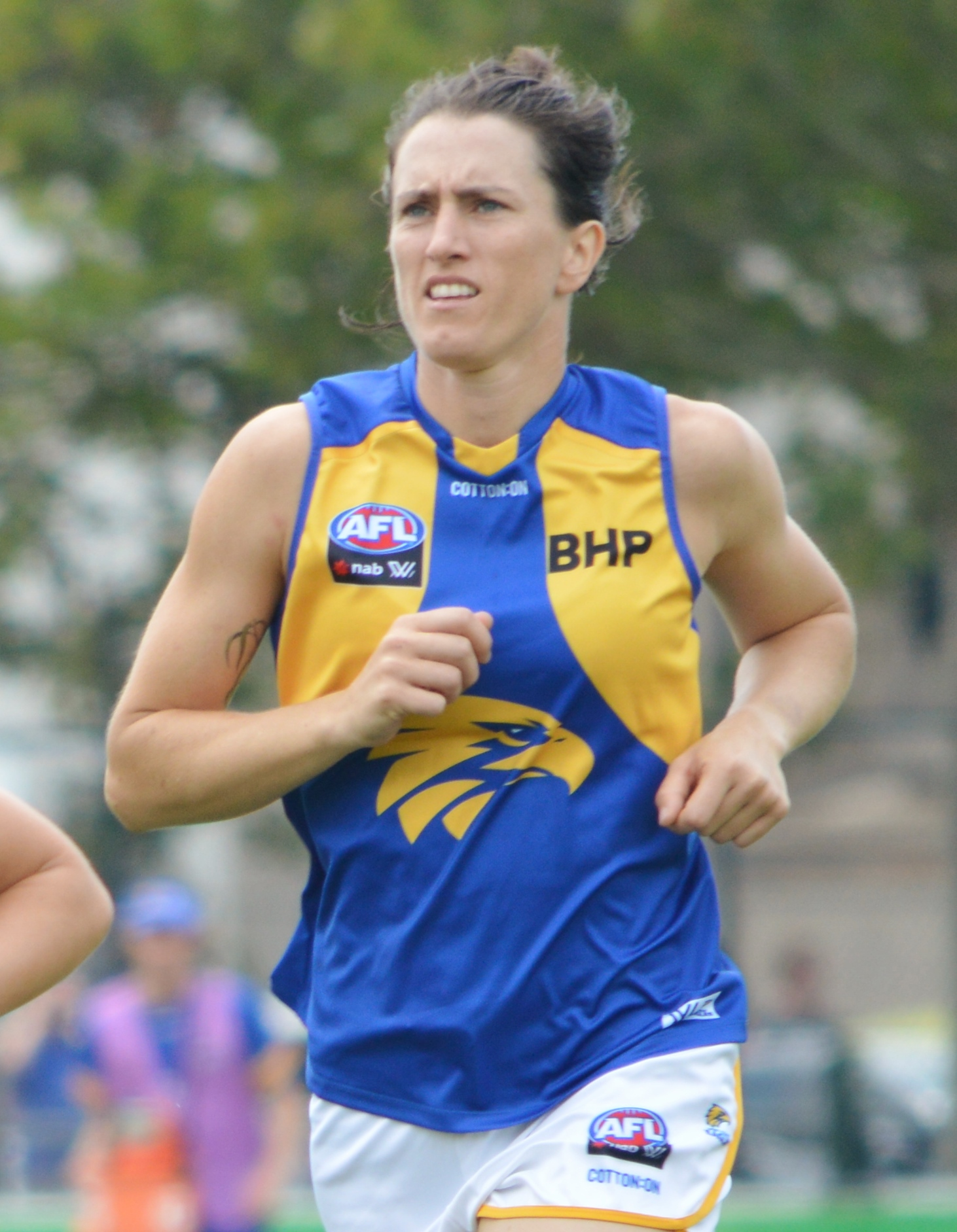
- Gilmore playing Australian rules football with West Coast in January 2020

Personal information
- Full name: Andrea Gilmore
- Born: 27 October 1988 (age 37)
- Occupation: Student
- Height: 1.82 m (6 ft 0 in)

Netball career
- Playing position: WD
Years	Club team	Apps
2008–present	West Coast Fever	
- Updated on 2009-03-15

Andrea Gilmore (born 27 October 1988) is an Australian netball and Australian rules football player with West Coast Fever in the ANZ Championship and West Coast Eagles in the AFL Women's competition (AFLW), respectively.
