= Brianna Green =

Australian rules footballer (born 1996)

Personal information
- Born: 20 November 1996 (age 29)
- Original team: East Fremantle (WAWFL)
- Draft: No. 13, 2016 AFL Women's draft
- Debut: Round 1, 2017, Fremantle vs. Western Bulldogs, at VU Whitten Oval
- Height: 161 cm (5 ft 3 in)
- Position: Midfield

Playing career^{1}
Years	Club	Games (Goals)
2017–2019	Fremantle	3 (0)
2020–2021	West Coast	4 (0)
Total		7 (0)
- ^{1} Playing statistics correct to the end of the 2021 season.

Brianna Green (born 20 November 1996) is an Australian rules footballer playing for West Coast in the AFL Women's competition. Green was drafted by Fremantle with their second selection and thirteenth overall in the 2016 AFL Women's draft. She made her debut in the thirty-two point loss to the Western Bulldogs at VU Whitten Oval in the opening round of the 2017 season. She played the first two matches for the year before missing the remainder of the year due to a shoulder injury. Green played in the club's opening match the following season, a twenty-six point loss to Fremantle at VU Whitten Oval. She would not make it through to the following week's match however, sustaining a serious knee injury at training two days before round 2. Scans later confirmed she had sustained a season ending ruptured anterior cruciate ligament, which will also sideline Green for the 2019 AFLW season. Green was delisted by the Eagles on 9 June 2021, after playing 7 games with the team throughout her career.
