= Ashton Hill =

Australian rules footballer (born 1995)

Personal information
- Born: 12 October 1995 (age 31)
- Original team: West Perth (WAWFL)
- Draft: Expansion signing, 2019
- Debut: Round 1, 2019, West Coast vs. Collingwood, at Victoria Park
- Height: 170 cm (5 ft 7 in)
- Position: Defender

Playing career^{1}
Years	Club	Games (Goals)
2020–2022	West Coast	9 (0)
- ^{1} Playing statistics correct to the end of the 2022 season.

Ashton Hill (born 12 October 1995) is a retired Australian rules footballer who played for West Coast in the AFL Women's (AFLW). A defender, she had previously played in the West Australian Women's Football League (WAWFL) before signing with West Coast for their first season in the AFLW. She played in the club's inaugural team.

== Junior and WAWFL career ==
Hill first played football for Mater Dei College. In 2014, she began playing for the Joondalup Falcons in the WAWFL reserves, winning the competition's best and fairest in her first two seasons. She captained the side to the 2016 premiership and finished runner-up in the best and fairest. In 2017, the Joondalup Falcons merged into the West Perth Falcons and Hill was voted to become West Perth's inaugural senior women's captain by her teammates. She remained captain for one more season, winning the club's best and fairest in the same year, before switching to East Fremantle for 2019, where she played in a premiership.

Hill was part of West Coast's female academy during her early career.

== AFLW career ==
In August 2019, Hill signed to West Coast ahead of its inaugural AFLW season. She debuted in the opening round of the season as part of West Coast's inaugural AFLW side, but ruptured her anterior cruciate ligament dodging an opponent during the second quarter and was ruled out injured for the rest of the season. In June 2022, after playing a full season following her injury limiting her to one appearance in two seasons, Hill retired to focus on work and family.
