= West Coast Eagles (AFL Women's) =

Women's Australian Rules Football team

Names
- Nickname: Eagles

2022 (S7) season
- Home-and-away season: 14th
- Leading goalkicker: Aimee Schmidt
- Best and fairest: Emma Swanson

Club details
- Colours: Royal blue Gold
- Competition: AFL Women's
- Owners: West Australian Football Commission (WAFC)
- Chairperson: Paul Fitzpatrick
- CEO: Don Pyke
- Coach: Daisy Pearce
- Captain: Emma Swanson
- Ground: Mineral Resources Park (6,500)
- Training ground: Mineral Resources Park

Uniforms
Home	Away	Clash

Other information
- Official website: Official website

The West Coast Eagles (abbreviated as Eagles) is an AFL Women's team based in Perth, Western Australia.

The team is associated with the West Coast Eagles (AFL Men's) team and in September 2017 was granted a license by the AFL to compete in the league from the start of the 2020 season. The team shares home games between Lathlain Park, Perth Stadium and Leederville Oval.

== Squad ==
West Coast Eagles · AFL Women's personnel
Senior list		Coaching staff
1 Lauren Wakfer; 2 Kellie Gibson; 3 Charlie Thomas (c); 4 Ella Roberts; 5 Courtney Rowley; 6 Bella Lewis (c); 7 Jess Rentsch; 8 Lucia Painter; 9 Roxy Roux; 10 Alison Drennan; 12 Charlotte Riggs; 13 Emma Swanson; 14 Belinda Smith; 15 Abbygail Bushby; 16 Zoe Wakfer; 18 Jaide Britton; 19 Amy Franklin	20 Sanne Bakker; 21 Mikayla Western (vc); 22 Georgie Cleaver; 23 Sarah Lakay; 27 Liz McGrath; 30 Beth Schilling; 32 Kayla Dalgleish; 35 Sophie McDonald; Lily Paterson; Mia Russo; Keeley Skepper; Jovie Skewes-Clinton; Ella Slocombe	Head coach: Daisy Pearce; Assistant coaches: Martene Pearman (back line); Baker Denneman (midfield); Rohan McHugh (forward line); Brett King (ruck); Andrew Di Loreto (development); Dylan Parsons (tackling); Legend: (c) Captain(s); (vc) Vice-captain(s); italics – Inactive; Long-term injury; Updated: 20 January 2026; Source(s): Players, coaches

== Season summaries ==
West Coast AFLW honour roll
Season	Ladder	W–L–D	Finals	Coach	Captain(s)	Best and fairest	Leading goalkicker
2020	13th ^	1–5–0	DNQ	Luke Dwyer	Emma Swanson	Dana Hooker	Hayley Bullas (2)
2021	12th	2–7–0	DNQ	Daniel Pratt	Emma Swanson	Isabella Lewis	Grace Kelly (7)
2022 (S6)	14th	1–9–0	DNQ	Michael Prior	Emma Swanson	Emma Swanson	Aimee Schmidt (7)
2022 (S7)	16th	2–8–0	DNQ	Michael Prior	Emma Swanson	Emma Swanson	Aimee Schmidt (5)
2023	17th	2–8–0	DNQ	Michael Prior	Emma Swanson	Charlotte Thomas	Kellie Gibson (12)

^ Denotes the ladder was split into two conferences. Figure refers to the club's overall finishing position in the home-and-away season.
