= Lucia Painter =

Australian rules footballer (born 2006)

Personal information
- Full name: Lucia Painter
- Nickname: Lu
- Born: 23 February 2006 (age 20)
- Original teams: Sandhurst Dragons; Bendigo Pioneers
- Draft: No. 7, 2024 AFL Women's National draft
- Height: 174 cm (5 ft 9 in)
- Position: Midfielder

Club information
- Current club: West Coast
- Number: 8

Playing career^{1}
Years	Club	Games (Goals)
2025–	West Coast	14 (11)
- ^{1} Playing statistics correct to the end of Round 3, 2026.

Career highlights
- 2025 AFL Women's Rising Star nomination; West Coast leading goalkicker: 2025; 22under22: 2025

Lucia Painter (born 23 February 2006) is an Australian rules footballer who plays for West Coast in the AFL Women's (AFLW).

== Early life ==
Painter is from Bendigo, Victoria. She first started playing Australian rules football for the Sandhurst Dragons. In her time at Sandhurst, she was a five-time premiership player. In 2021, she joined the Bendigo Pioneers at NAB League Girls level, playing two games in her debut season and averaging 10.5 disposals per game.

In 2024, Painter was made co-captain of the Pioneers. She played 11 games, kicking six goals and finished runner-up in the Coates Talent League Best and Fairest award, behind eventual top draft pick Ash Centra. She also represented Victoria Country and was named in the All-Australian team.

She attended Marist College in Bendigo.

== AFL Women's career ==
Painter was drafted by West Coast with pick number 7 in the 2024 AFL Women's draft. She made her debut in Round 1 of the 2025 AFL Women's season against the Gold Coast Suns at Lathlain Park, kicking 3 goals within a seven-minute period during the third quarter. She was awarded a Rising Star nomination after the match.

Painter finished her first season at the Eagles as their leading goalkicker, having kicked 10 goals from 11 games. She also finished equal-second in the Rising Star award with 23 votes, only behind Sydney's Zippy Fish.

== Statistics ==
Updated to the end of the 2025 season.

Legend
G	Goals	K	Kicks	D	Disposals	T	Tackles
B	Behinds	H	Handballs	M	Marks

Season	Team	No.	Games	Totals							Averages (per game)							Votes
Season	Team	No.	Games	G	B	K	H	D	M	T	G	B	K	H	D	M	T	Votes
2025	West Coast	8	11	10	10	88	37	125	27	37	0.9	0.9	8.0	3.4	11.4	2.5	3.4	2
Career			11	10	10	88	37	125	27	37	0.9	0.9	8.0	3.4	11.4	2.5	3.4	2
