= Brooke Boileau =

Australian rules footballer (born 2006)

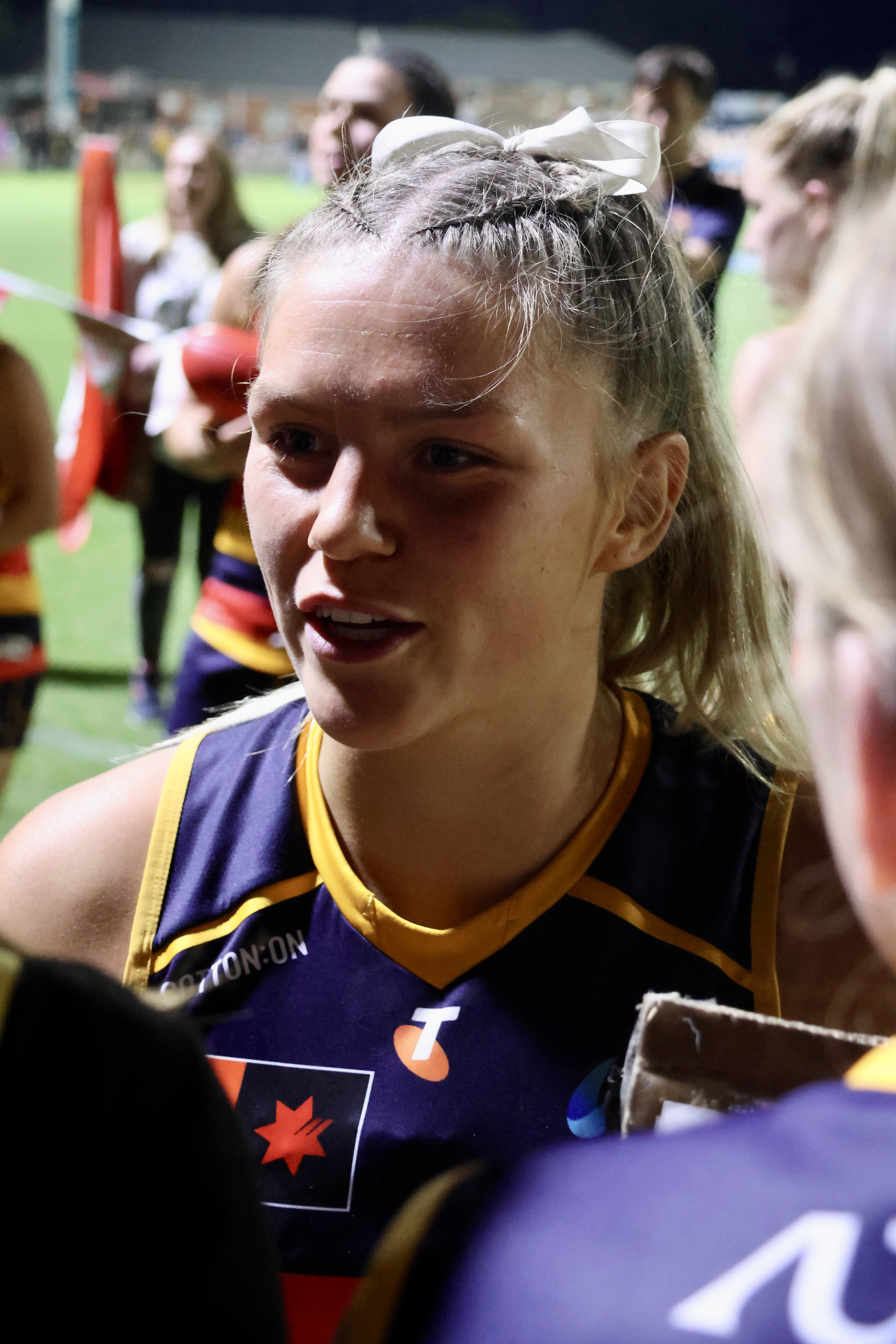
- Boileau with Adelaide in 2025

Personal information
- Born: 28 January 2005 (age 21)
- Original teams: South Adelaide (SANFLW); Mount Compass (GSFL)
- Draft: No. 22, 2023 national draft
- Debut: Round 1, 2024, Adelaide vs. Port Adelaide, at Alberton Oval
- Height: 170 cm (5 ft 7 in)
- Position: Midfielder

Club information
- Current club: Carlton
- Number: 22

Playing career^{1}
Years	Club	Games (Goals)
2024–2025	Adelaide	18 (3)
2026–	Carlton	0 (0)
Total		18 (3)
- ^{1} Playing statistics correct to the end of 2025.

Career highlights
- AFL Women's Rising Star nomination: 2025; 22under22 team: 2025

Brooke Boileau (born 28 January 2005) is a professional Australian rules football player who currently plays for Carlton in the AFL Women's (AFLW). She previously played for the Adelaide Crows from 2024 to 2025.

== Early life ==
Originally from Mount Compass Football Club, Boileau played her junior football with South Adelaide in the SANFL Women's League. Excelling at a young age, she was named in the 2023 AFL National Championships U18 Girls All-Australian Team. In her successful junior year, she was also reward with a Team of the Year selection and the Coaches’ Award at South Adelaide.

== AFL Women's career ==
Boileau was drafted by Adelaide with their first pick in the 2023 national draft, and the 22nd overall. She made her debut for the club in the round one, 2024 Showdown against Port Adelaide at Alberton Oval. She missed Adelaide's first final with a finger injury, but despite her recovery was not selected for the remainder of the finals series, managing four games in her debut season.

She had a breakout year in 2025, becoming a mainstay in Adelaide's midfield and playing all games. She kicked her first career goal in round four against Brisbane. Boileau was nominated for the 2025 Rising Star award in round seven against Sydney when she collected a career-high 17 disposals and 6 tackles in the win. She requested a trade to Carlton following Adelaide's semi-final exit in November.
