= 2025 AFL Women's Rising Star =

- Sponsored by: Telstra
- Date: 24 November 2025
- Venue: Crown Melbourne
- Hosted by: Brihony Dawson; Lauren Wood
- Winner: Zippy Fish (Sydney)

Television/radio coverage
- Network: Fox Footy

The 2025 AFL Women's Rising Star award was presented to the player adjudged the best young player during the 2025 AFL Women's season. Sydney's Zippy Fish won the award with the maximum 50 votes.

== Eligibility ==
To be eligible for nomination, players must be under 21 years of age on 31 December, have not previously been nominated for the award (unless they have played ten or fewer matches at the beginning of the season) and have not previously won the award.

== Nominations ==
Table of nominees
| Round | Player | Club | Ref. |
|---|---|---|---|
| 1 | Lucia Painter | West Coast | |
| 2 | Zippy Fish | Sydney | |
| 3 | Havana Harris | Gold Coast | |
| 4 | Sophie McKay | Carlton | |
| 5 | Ash Centra | Collingwood | |
| 6 | Poppy Scholz | Carlton | |
| 7 | Brooke Boileau | Adelaide | |
| 8 | Kaitlyn Srhoj | Greater Western Sydney | |
| 9 | Jess Rentsch | West Coast | |
| 10 | Emma McDonald | Western Bulldogs | |
| 11 | India Rasheed | Adelaide | |
| 12 | Sarah Poustie | Western Bulldogs | |

Table of nominations by club
| Number | Club | Player | Round |
|---|---|---|---|
| 2 | Adelaide | Brooke Boileau | 7 |
| 2 | Adelaide | India Rasheed | 11 |
| 2 | Carlton | Sophie McKay | 4 |
| 2 | Carlton | Poppy Scholz | 6 |
| 2 | West Coast | Lucia Painter | 1 |
| 2 | West Coast | Jess Rentsch | 9 |
| 2 | Western Bulldogs | Emma McDonald | 10 |
| 2 | Western Bulldogs | Sarah Poustie | 12 |
| 1 | Collingwood | Ash Centra | 5 |
| 1 | Gold Coast | Havana Harris | 3 |
| 1 | Greater Western Sydney | Kaitlyn Srhoj | 8 |
| 1 | Sydney | Zippy Fish | 2 |

== Final voting ==
Table of votes
| Placing | Player | Club | Nom. | Votes |
|---|---|---|---|---|
| 1 | Zippy Fish | Sydney | 2 | 50 |
| 2 | Lucia Painter | West Coast | 1 | 23 |
| 2 | Poppy Scholz | Carlton | 6 | 23 |
| 4 | Havana Harris | Gold Coast | 3 | 19 |
| 5 | Sophie McKay | Carlton | 5 | 19 |
| 6 | Kaitlin Srhoj | Greater Western Sydney | 8 | 7 |
| 7 | Jess Rentsch | West Coast | 9 | 6 |
| 8 | Ash Centra | Collingwood | 5 | 4 |
| 9 | Emma McDonald | Western Bulldogs | 10 | 2 |
| 10 | Sarah Poustie | Western Bulldogs | 12 | 1 |
| 11 | Brooke Boileau | Adelaide | 7 | 0 |
| 11 | India Rasheed | Adelaide | 11 | 0 |

== See also ==
- 2025 AFL Rising Star
