= Ava Usher =

Australian rules footballer (born 2007)

- Usher in November 2026

Personal information
- Born: 11 August 2007 (age 19); Cairns, Queensland
- Original team: Bond University (QAFLW)
- Draft: No. 7, 2025 national draft
- Debut: Round 1, 2026, Gold Coast vs. Western Bulldogs, at Carrara Stadium
- Height: 165 cm (5 ft 5 in)
- Position: Midfielder

Club information
- Current club: Gold Coast
- Number: 10

Playing career^{1}
Years	Club	Games (Goals)
2026–	Gold Coast	9 (9)
- ^{1} Playing statistics correct to the end of round 9, 2026.

Career highlights
- Rising Star nominee: 2026

Ava Usher (born 11 August 2007) is an Australian rules footballer with the Gold Coast Suns in the AFL Women's (AFLW).

== Early life ==
Usher was born in Cairns, Queensland and grew up on the Gold Coast from the age of two after her family relocated back to their hometown in Currumbin. She attended Hillcrest Christian College throughout her upbringing and became a National representative in basketball, swimming and surf lifesaving throughout her adolescence. In 2019, one of her school friends and future Suns teammate Sunny Lappin convinced Usher to begin playing Australian rules football and the pair would lead Hillcrest Christian College to an AFL Queensland Junior State Championship that year. She subsequently signed up to play club football for Burleigh in the years that followed and joined the Gold Coast Suns Academy at 11 years of age.

In 2023, at 15 years of age, Usher was awarded the best and fairest award at the under 16 national championships for her outstanding performances for Queensland as a bottom ager and played and started in the sunder 18 QLD team at the National championships and was awarded an All Australian spot as a rover at 15 and 16 years of age. Usher in that same year was awarded QAFLW team of the year and was named as the QAFLW rising star now at just 16 years of age. Along with many accolades she was voted second best on ground in Bond University's 2023 QAFLW Senior Grand Final victory behind best friend and future Suns teammate Havana Harris. She impressed so much in 2023 that many scouts believed she was capable of playing in the AFLW at 16 years of age before tearing her ACL on the eve of her 2024 bottom age season. Along with football, Usher continued to play basketball for her school and was Hillcrest Christian College's top scorer in their 2023 under-17 Australian National Schools Basketball Championship win.

== AFL Women's career ==
Despite her ACL injury requiring 18 months of recovery, Usher was drafted as an academy selection by the Gold Coast Suns with the seventh pick in the 2025 AFL Women's draft, matching a bid from Collingwood.

After making her debut in the round one, 2026 match against the Western Bulldogs, Usher became a mainstay in the improving Suns' squad, eventually leading into a two-goal performance and a Rising Star nomination in round 9 against Melbourne. Despite becoming one of the favourites to win the award, she became inelgibile after receiving a suspension for rough conduct against Richmond's Bec Miller. Usher missed the round 12 match against Greater Western Sydney.
