= Zach Reid =

Australian football league player

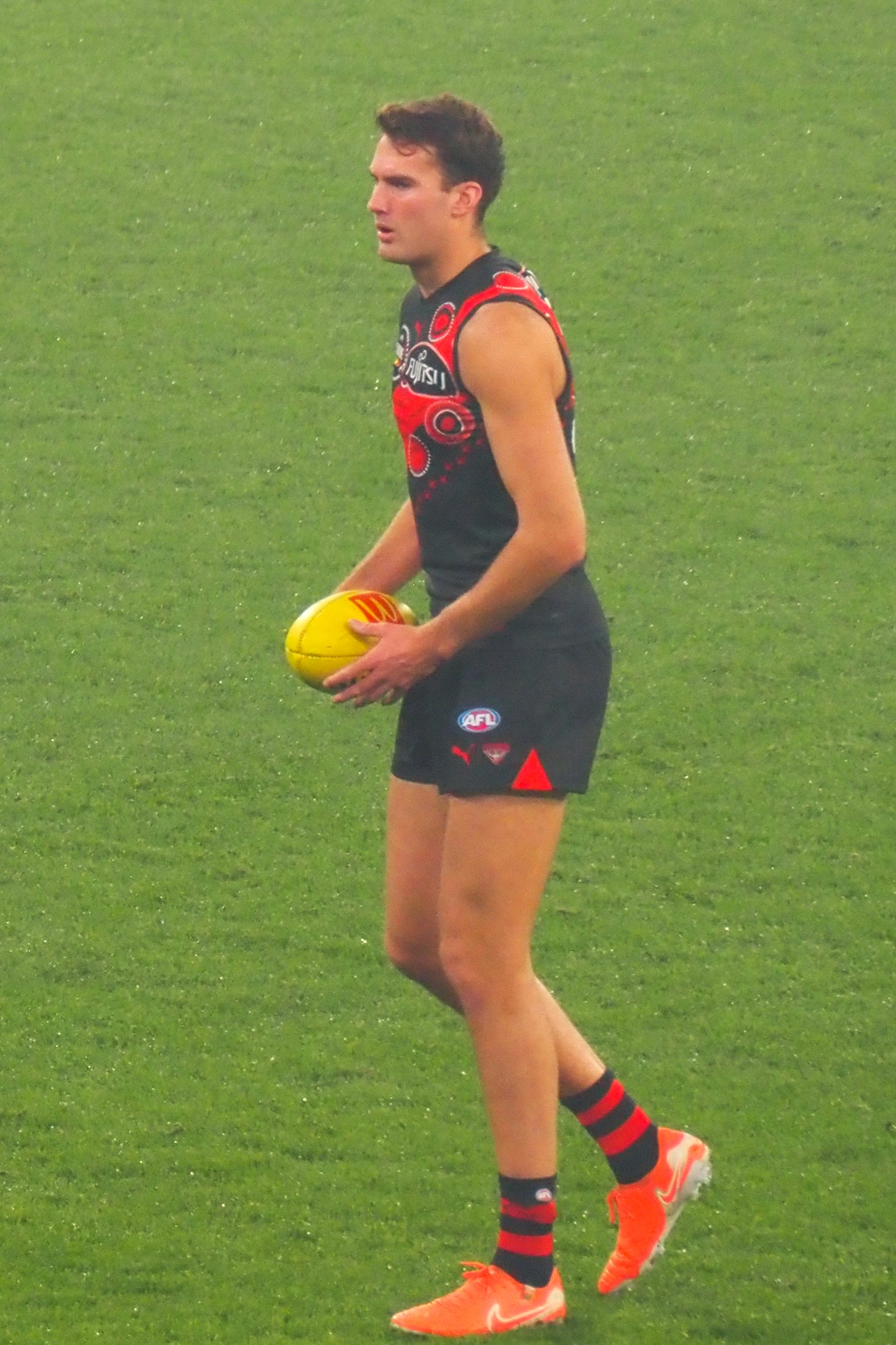
- Reid playing for Essendon in 2025

Personal information
- Born: 2 March 2002 (age 24)
- Original team: Gippsland Power (TAC Cup)
- Draft: No. 10, 2020 national draft
- Debut: 17 April 2021, Essendon vs. Brisbane Lions, at The Gabba
- Height: 202 cm (6 ft 8 in)
- Weight: 90 kg (198 lb)
- Position: Key Defender

Club information
- Current club: Essendon
- Number: 31

Playing career^{1}
Years	Club	Games (Goals)
2021–	Essendon	40 (1)
- ^{1} Playing statistics correct to the end of round 22, 2026.

Zach Reid (born 2 March 2002) is an Australian rules footballer who plays for Essendon in the Australian Football League (AFL). He was recruited by the Essendon with the 10th draft pick in the 2020 AFL draft.

== Early football ==
Reid came from Leongatha, where he played for the Leongatha Football Club in the Gippsland Football League. He played 36 games for the club between 2017 and 2020, kicking 35 goals in that time. He played for the Gippsland Power in the NAB League, alongside future draftees Caleb Serong and Sam Flanders, after previously playing for them in the Under 16 squads. He played 15 games with the Power, averaging 11 disposals, 4 marks and 2 tackles a game.

His younger brother Archer Reid plays for the West Coast Eagles and his grandfather Peter McRae played for Footscray in the 1950s.

== AFL career ==
Reid stated that he based his playing style off that of All-Australian Harris Andrews. Reid debuted in the 5th round of the 2021 AFL season, in the Essendon's 57 point loss to Brisbane Lions. On debut, Reid collected 10 disposals, 1 mark and 5 tackles.

Suffering from a stress injury in his back, Reid finished his debut season with one senior game and managed a further seven in 2022 due to a foot injury.

A hamstring injury in July 2023 while playing in the VFL ended Reid's season early with no further senior level AFL games played.

In the first half of the 2025 season, Reid broke out to establish himself as one of the best performing young players in the league. Reid received widespread plaudits for his form, including from club legend James Hird. However, in Round 11, Reid suffered a hamstring strain, which sidelined him. Reid then suffered a further hamstring setback when he was on the verge of a return, and didn't play again for the rest of the season. Despite missing the second half of the season, the 10 matches Reid played in 2025 were the most in his five seasons in the AFL to date, and he was rewarded with a three-year contract extension to keep him at Essendon until the end of the 2028 season.

== Statistics ==
Updated to the end of round 22, 2026.

Legend
G	Goals	K	Kicks	D	Disposals	T	Tackles
B	Behinds	H	Handballs	M	Marks

Season	Team	No.	Games	Totals							Averages (per game)							Votes
Season	Team	No.	Games	G	B	K	H	D	M	T	G	B	K	H	D	M	T	Votes
2021	Essendon	31	1	0	0	5	5	10	1	5	0.0	0.0	5.0	5.0	10.0	1.0	5.0	0
2022	Essendon	31	7	0	0	35	24	59	23	16	0.0	0.0	5.0	3.4	8.4	3.3	2.3	0
2023	Essendon	31	0	—	—	—	—	—	—	—	—	—	—	—	—	—	—	0
2024	Essendon	31	1	0	0	1	2	3	2	1	0.0	0.0	1.0	2.0	3.0	2.0	1.0	0
2025	Essendon	31	10	0	0	110	44	154	77	25	0.0	0.0	11.0	4.4	15.4	7.7	2.5	0
2026	Essendon	31	21	1	1	188	84	272	119	26	0.0	0.0	9.0	4.0	13.0	5.7	1.2	0
Career			40	1	1	339	159	498	222	73	0.0	0.0	8.5	4.0	12.5	5.6	1.8	0
