= Archer Reid =

Australian rules footballer (born 2005)

Personal information
- Born: 19 September 2005 (age 21)
- Original team: Inverloch-Kongwak / Gippsland Power
- Draft: No. 30, 2023 national draft
- Debut: Round 1, 2025, West Coast vs. Gold Coast, at Optus Stadium
- Height: 203 cm (6 ft 8 in)
- Position: Forward / Ruck

Club information
- Current club: West Coast
- Number: 22

Playing career^{1}
Years	Club	Games (Goals)
2024–	West Coast	20 (8)
Total		20 (8)
- ^{1} Playing statistics correct to the end of round 22, 2026.

Archer Reid (born 19 September 2005) is a professional Australian rules footballer playing for the West Coast Eagles in the Australian Football League (AFL). Standing at 203cm, he plays primarily as a tall forward but can also play as a ruckman.

== Early life ==
Reid is from the Victorian town of Inverloch. He played his early football for Inverloch-Kongwak in the West Gippsland Football Netball Competition where he was a part of their 2023 premiership team, and later represented Vic Country twice at the Under 18 National Championships. Reid attended Bass Coast College in Wonthaggi. He is the younger brother of current Essendon defender Zach Reid. His father, Craig, previously played five games in the WAFL for Perth in 1991, and his grandfather Peter McRae previously played in the VFL for Footscray in 1956/1957.

Reid was drafted by the West Coast Eagles from the Gippsland Power with pick number 30 in the 2023 national draft. Although he was drafted in 2023, a pre-existing knee injury meant he didn't play a senior game in his first year. He instead played for West Coast's reserves team in the WAFL, where he kicked 17 goals from 15 games. In September 2024, Reid signed a two-year contract extension, keeping him at West Coast until at least the end of 2027. He is not related to teammate Harley Reid, with whom he shares the same surname.

== AFL career ==
=== 2025: Debut season ===
Reid made his debut in Round 1 of the 2025 AFL season against Gold Coast at Optus Stadium. He was impressive two weeks later in Western Derby 60, recording eight disposals, six hit-outs, and kicking two goals during the match to be one of the Eagles' best players. In Round 22 against Adelaide, Reid injured his toe in the first quarter and was ruled out for the remainder of the season. He had played 13 games up until that point.

== Statistics ==
Updated to the end of round 22, 2026.

Legend
G	Goals	K	Kicks	D	Disposals	T	Tackles
B	Behinds	H	Handballs	M	Marks	H/O	Hit-outs

Season	Team	No.	Games	Totals								Averages (per game)								Votes
Season	Team	No.	Games	G	B	K	H	D	M	T	H/O	G	B	K	H	D	M	T	H/O	Votes
2025	West Coast	22	14	5	10	48	31	79	29	22	73	0.4	0.7	3.4	2.2	5.6	2.1	1.6	5.2	0
2026	West Coast	22	6	3	3	21	15	36	14	7	24	0.5	0.5	3.5	2.5	6.0	2.3	1.2	4.0	0
Career			20	8	13	69	46	115	43	29	97	0.4	0.7	3.5	2.3	5.8	2.2	1.5	4.9	0
