= 2024 AFL Women's draft =

Tenth AFL Women's (AFLW) draft

General information
- Date: 16 December 2024
- Time: 7:00 pm AEDT
- Location: Marvel Stadium
- Network: AFL Media
- Sponsored by: Telstra

Overview
- League: AFL Women's
- First selection: Ash Centra (Collingwood)

The 2024 AFL Women's draft was the annual draft that enabled the 18 clubs in the AFL Women's (AFLW) competition to recruit players following the 2024 AFL Women's season. It was held on 16 December 2024. It took place during the 2024–25 AFL Women's player movement period, which began in November 2024 and ran until March 2025.

== Background ==
In June 2024, the Australian Football League (AFL) announced that long-time major partner Telstra had expanded its partnership with the league to become the naming rights sponsor for the AFL and AFLW drafts and both competitions' Rising Star awards from 2024 onwards. Later that month, AFL executive general manager Laura Kane announced that the AFL Women's draft would transition to a fully national draft for the first time, following feedback from clubs and the use of an "opt-in model" in the 2023 draft, where nearly 70 per cent of draftees (including twelve of the top 16 selections) nominated for the national draft pool rather than chose to remain in their home state. The draft also saw the introduction of minimum two-year contracts for draftees. In August, AFLW general manager Emma Moore announced that the girls' draft combine would also become a national event for the first time, having previously been staged only as state-based events, and would be held in Melbourne in October on the same weekend as the boys' combine. Players who were not invited to the national combine were also able to attend smaller state-based draft combines in Victoria, South Australia and Western Australia.

The draft was held on 16 December at Marvel Stadium and broadcast on afl.com.au and the official AFL app. In the week leading up to the draft, experts from afl.com.au, The Age and Fox Sports considered Gippsland Power midfielder Ash Centra the favourite to be taken by Collingwood with the first selection; the Herald Sun reported the day before the draft that Collingwood had already settled on Centra for the selection, with Collingwood confirming the selection the following night at the draft.

== National draft ==
The order of selections for the national draft was finalised on 11 December, at the conclusion of the 2024 trade period.

A	Academy selection
FD	Father–daughter selection

Rd.	Pick	Player	Club	Recruited from		Notes
Rd.	Pick	Player	Club	Club	League	Notes
1	1	Ash Centra	Collingwood	Gippsland Power	Talent League Girls	
1	2	Havana Harris (A (Note: Matched bid from Melbourne))	Gold Coast	Gold Coast Academy/Bond University	QAFL Women's	
1	3	Molly O'Hehir	Melbourne	South Fremantle	WAFL Women's	Received from Gold Coast
1	4	Sara Howley	Greater Western Sydney	Geelong Falcons	Talent League Girls	
1	5	Zippy Fish	Sydney	East Fremantle	WAFL Women's	
1	6	Poppy Scholz	Carlton	Glenelg	SANFL Women's	
1	7	Lucia Painter	West Coast	Bendigo Pioneers	Talent League Girls	
1	8	Emma McDonald	Western Bulldogs	Oakleigh Chargers	Talent League Girls	
1	9	Grace Belloni	Essendon	Eastern Ranges	Talent League Girls	Received from St Kilda
1	10	Lexi Gregor	Geelong	Bendigo Pioneers	Talent League Girls	
1	11	Sierra Grieves	Richmond	Western Jets	Talent League Girls	Received from Melbourne
1	12	Holly Ridewood	Essendon	Northern Knights	Talent League Girls	
1	13	India Rasheed	Adelaide	Sturt	SANFL Women's	Received from Richmond
1	14	Georgie Brisbane	Fremantle	Eastern Ranges	Talent League Girls	
1	15	Lavinia Cox	Hawthorn	Bendigo Pioneers	Talent League Girls	
1	16	Claudia Wright	Brisbane	Claremont	WAFL Women's	Received from Port Adelaide
1	17	Sophie McKay (FD (Note: Matched bid from Geelong))	Carlton	Sandringham Dragons	Talent League Girls	
1	18	Sienna Tallariti	Geelong	Oakleigh Chargers	Talent League Girls	Received from Adelaide
1	19	Lily Paterson	Port Adelaide	Swan Districts	WAFL Women's	Received from Brisbane
1	20	Zoe Hargreaves	Richmond	Northern Knights	Talent League Girls	Received from North Melbourne
2	21	Maggie Mahony	Melbourne	Oakleigh Chargers	Talent League Girls	Received from Gold Coast
2	22	Grace Martin	Greater Western Sydney	Woodville-West Torrens	SANFL Women's	
2	23	Daisy Flockart	Hawthorn	Sandringham Dragons	Talent League Girls	Received from Collingwood; previously from Geelong; originally from Sydney
2	24	Charlotte Riggs	West Coast	Central District	SANFL Women's	
2	25	Sarah Poustie	Western Bulldogs	Oakleigh Chargers	Talent League Girls	
2	26	Georgia Knight	Collingwood	Eastern Ranges	Talent League Girls	Received from Hawthorn; originally from St Kilda
2	27	Heidi Talbot (A)	Gold Coast	Gold Coast Academy/Bond University	QAFL Women's	Received from Geelong
2	28	Grace Baba	Hawthorn	Eastern Ranges	Talent League Girls	Received from Collingwood; originally from Melbourne
2	29	Mia Salisbury (A (Note: Matched bid from Essendon))	Gold Coast	Gold Coast Academy/Bond University	QAFL Women's	Received from Richmond
2	30	Taya Chambers	Essendon	East Fremantle	WAFL Women's	
2	31	Paige Scott	Richmond	Essendon	AFL Women's	Received from Fremantle
2	32	Zoe Besanko	St Kilda	Dandenong Stingrays	Talent League Girls	Received from Hawthorn
2	33	Jasmine Evans	Port Adelaide	Woodville-West Torrens	SANFL Women's	
2	34	Holly Egan	Fremantle	Murray Bushrangers	Talent League Girls	Received from Richmond; originally from Adelaide
2	35	Sophie Strong	Essendon	Tasmania Devils	Talent League Girls	Received from Brisbane
2	36	Claire Mahony	North Melbourne	Greater Western Victoria Rebels	Talent League Girls	
3	37	Piper Dunlop	Geelong	Geelong Cats	VFL Women's	Received from Collingwood
3	38	Evie Parker	Fremantle	Eastern Ranges	Talent League Girls	Received from Richmond; originally from Gold Coast
3	39	Lilly Baker (A)	Brisbane	Brisbane Academy/Maroochydore	QAFL Women's	Received from Port Adelaide; previously from Adelaide; originally from Greater Western Sydney
3	40	Jemma Whitington-Charity	Port Adelaide	North Adelaide	SANFL Women's	Received from Sydney
3	41	Nyalli Milne (A)	Gold Coast	Gold Coast Academy/Bond University	QAFL Women's	Received from Carlton
3	42	Violet Patterson (FD (Note: Matched bid from North Melbourne))	Collingwood	Glenelg	SANFL Women's	
3	43	Amy Gavin Mangan	North Melbourne	Offaly	All-Ireland ILFC	Received from West Coast
3	44	Georgia McKee	Adelaide	Central District	SANFL Women's	Received from Western Bulldogs
3	45	Elli Symonds	Hawthorn	Dandenong Stingrays	Talent League Girls	Received from St Kilda
3	46	Loulou Field	Carlton	Western Jets	Talent League Girls	Received from Richmond; previously from Fremantle; previously from Collingwood; originally from Geelong
3	47	Tara Harrington (A)	Gold Coast	Gold Coast Academy/Bond University	QAFL Women's	Received from Melbourne
3	48	Chloe Gaunt	Port Adelaide	Brisbane Academy/Coorparoo	QAFL Women's	Received from Essendon
3	49	Keely Hardingham	Western Bulldogs	Western Bulldogs	VFL Women's	Received from Adelaide; originally from Richmond
3	50	Rebecca Clottey	Hawthorn	Geelong Falcons	Talent League Girls	
3	51	Indi Strom	Fremantle	South Fremantle	WAFL Women's	Received from North Melbourne; previously from Sydney; originally from Port Adelaide
3	52	Jasmine Sowden	Port Adelaide	Gippsland Power	Talent League Girls	Received from Adelaide
3	53	Lucy Boyd	West Coast	West Adelaide	SANFL Women's	Received from North Melbourne
4	54	Pass	Richmond	—		Received from Carlton; originally from Gold Coast
4	55	Kyla Forbes	St Kilda	Calder Cannons	Talent League Girls	Received from Greater Western Sydney
4	56	Amelia Martin (A)	Sydney	Sydney Academy	Talent League Girls	
4	57	Kayla Dalgleish	West Coast	Dandenong Stingrays	Talent League Girls	
4	58	Alana Gee	St Kilda	Gold Coast	AFL Women's	
5	59	Caitlin Reid	Sydney	East Coast Eagles	AFL Sydney Women's	
5	60	Pass	Essendon	—		
6	61	Sarah Steele-Park	Sydney	North Adelaide	SANFL Women's	
7	62	Pass	Geelong	—		
7	63	Amelia Dethridge	Melbourne	Cross-code athlete (cross country, hockey, swimming)		

== Rookie signings ==
Player	Club	Date	Other/former sport	Ref.
Kellyann Hogan	Collingwood	2 December 2024	Gaelic football	
Grace Kós	Greater Western Sydney	5 December 2024	Gaelic football	
Matilda Banfield	Fremantle	6 December 2024	Hockey	

== See also ==
- 2024 AFL draft
