= Poppy Scholz =

Personal information
- Born: 31 December 2006 (age 19)
- Original team: Glenelg (SANFLW)
- Draft: No. 6, 2024 national draft
- Debut: Round 1, 2026, Carlton vs. Collingwood, at Princes Park
- Height: 179 cm (5 ft 10 in)
- Position: Utility

Club information
- Current club: Carlton
- Number: 7

Playing career^{1}
Years	Club	Games (Goals)
2025–	Carlton	28 (19)
- ^{1} Playing statistics correct to the end of the 2026 season.

Career highlights
- Rising Star nomination: 2025

Poppy Scholz (born 31 December 2006) is an Australian rules footballer who plays for the Carlton Football Club in the AFL Women's (AFLW). She was drafted by Carlton from Glenelg in the SANFL Women's League (SANFLW) with the sixth selection in the 2024 AFL Women's draft.

== Early life and SANFLW career ==
Scholz played for Mitcham as a junior before joining Glenelg in the SANFLW. Prior to her AFLW debut, Scholz was named one of the most promising young footballers in South Australia by The Advertiser.

In the 2024 national draft, Scholz was one of ten SANFLW players selected, with Carlton using their first pick, sixth overall, to recruit her.

== AFL Women's career ==
Scholz made her AFLW debut in the round one win against Collingwood early in the 2025 AFL Women's season at IKON Park. She kicked a goal on debut. She received a nomination for the 2025 AFL Women's Rising Star award following a strong defensive performance in round six against North Melbourne.

Scholz began the 2026 season in a new role, playing as a ruck against St Kilda. She kicked the first goal of the new season. Her aerial strength and adaptability was described as one of her strengths, earning comparisons to versatile AFL ruckman Luke Jackson.

== Personal life and family ==
Scholz's mother, Peta Scholz (née Squire), is a former Australian netballer who won a World Championship in 1999, and a Commonwealth Games gold medal in 2002 with the Australia netball team. Peta also won premierships with the Adelaide Thunderbirds in the ANZ Championship.

Scholz's older sister Matilda also plays in the AFLW with Port Adelaide.The pair attended Scotch College in Adelaide, and her father David was their junior football coach.
