= Matthew Ferguson (Australian footballer) =

Australian rules footballer

Personal information
- Born: 1 October 1984 (age 42)
- Original team: Gippsland / Heyfield
- Debut: Round 12, 14 June 2003, St Kilda vs. Port Adelaide, at York Park
- Height: 187 cm (6 ft 2 in)
- Weight: 87 kg (192 lb)

Playing career^{1}
Years	Club	Games (Goals)
2003–2008	St Kilda	12 (0)
- ^{1} Playing statistics correct to the end of 2008.

Matthew J. Ferguson (born 1 October 1984) is a former Australian rules footballer in the Australian Football League (AFL).

He was recruited as the number 22 draft pick in the 2002 AFL draft from Gippsland. He made his debut for St Kilda in Round 12, 2003 against Port Adelaide.

After being delisted at the end of the 2006 season following just eight games in four seasons, he was given a second chance when redrafted in the 2006 AFL draft.

He was recalled to the side for the clash with West Coast in Round 21, 2007, after having missed selection in 44 consecutive matches.

Ferguson took a huge screamer against Melbourne in Round 10, 2008 to receive a nomination for Mark of the Year, but was delisted again at the end of the season.

In 2009 he moved the Western Australia to play for Perth in the West Australian Football League.
