= Sophie McKay (footballer) =

Australian rules footballer (born 2006)

Personal information
- Born: 27 April 2006 (age 20)
- Original teams: Sandringham Dragons (Talent League Girls); Prahran (VAFA)
- Draft: No. 17 (F/D), 2024 national draft
- Debut: Round 1, 2025, Carlton vs. Collingwood, at Princes Park
- Height: 167 cm (5 ft 6 in)
- Position: Midfielder

Club information
- Current club: Carlton
- Number: 55

Playing career^{1}
Years	Club	Games (Goals)
2025–	Carlton	15 (18)
- ^{1} Playing statistics correct to the end of the 2025 season.

Career highlights
- Carlton Leading Goalkicker: 2025; AFL Women's Rising Star nominee: 2025; 22under22 team: 2025

Sophie McKay (born 27 April 2006) is an Australian rules footballer playing for the Carlton Football Club in the AFL Women's (AFLW).

== Junior career ==
McKay played for the Sandringham Dragons in the Talent League Girls. She averaged 22.5 disposals a game in 2024. She also represented Vic Metro in the Under 18 Championships.

== AFL career ==
McKay was selected by Carlton with pick 17 of the 2024 AFLW draft under the father-daughter rule. She made her debut in round one of the 2025 AFLW season.

In round four of the 2025 season, McKay earned a nomination for the 2025 AFL Women's Rising Star after kicking two goals and having 13 disposals. At the end of the 2025 season she came fifth in the voting for the award. She also won a place in the 2025 AFLW 22 Under 22 team.

== Statistics ==
Updated to the end of the 2025 season.

Legend
G	Goals	K	Kicks	D	Disposals	T	Tackles
B	Behinds	H	Handballs	M	Marks

Season	Team	No.	Games	Totals							Averages (per game)							Votes
Season	Team	No.	Games	G	B	K	H	D	M	T	G	B	K	H	D	M	T	Votes
2025	Carlton	55	15	18	12	117	79	196	31	39	1.2	0.8	7.8	5.3	13.1	2.1	2.6	1
Career			15	18	12	117	79	196	31	39	1.2	0.8	7.8	5.3	13.1	2.1	2.6	1

== Personal life ==
McKay's father, Andrew, played 244 games for Carlton in the AFL. Her sister, Abbie, is also a current Carlton player.

McKay is a person with attention deficit hyperactivity disorder. She was diagnosed following the COVID-19 pandemic and takes "life-changing" medication.
