= Ash Centra =

Personal information
- Full name: Ashley Centra
- Nickname: Cench
- Born: 2 June 2006 (age 20); Seaspray, Victoria
- Original team: Gippsland Power (Talent League)
- Draft: No. 1, 2024 AFL Women's draft
- Debut: Round 1, 2025, Collingwood vs. Carlton, at Princes Park
- Height: 177 cm (5 ft 10 in)
- Position: Midfielder

Club information
- Current club: Collingwood
- Number: 16

Playing career^{1}
Years	Club	Games (Goals)
2025–	Collingwood	19 (14)
- ^{1} Playing statistics correct to the end of the 2026 season.

Career highlights
- 2× Rising Star nominee: 2025, 2026; 22under22 team: 2025

Ashley Centra (born 2 June 2006) is an Australian rules football player who plays for the Collingwood Football Club in the AFL Women's (AFLW) competition. She was selected with the first overall pick in the 2024 AFL Women's draft.

== Early life and junior football ==
Ash Centra was born in Seaspray, Victoria. After choosing football over basketball, played junior football with Gippsland Power in the Talent League Girls and was selected for Vic Country at the 2024 AFL Under‑18 Championships.

Centra averaged 27.7 disposals and kicked 18 goals over 13 games in the 2024 season, and was named as the league's best and fairest. She earned All-Australian honours at the AFL National Championships and recorded a standout 47-disposal, 4-goal game in Round 2.

== AFL Women's career ==
Centra was selected by Collingwood Football Club with the first overall pick in the 2024 national draft. In December 2024, Collingwood extended Centra’s contract until the end of the 2027 season, before she had played an official AFLW game.

Prior to her round one debut against Carlton, Centra went viral for bouncing the football between her legs like a basketballer. She kicked a goal that night on debut. In round five, Centra collected a career-best 18 disposals, and was rewarded with a Rising Star nomination.

Centra starred in the round eight, 2026 clash against Melbourne, collecting 30 disposals and kicking a goal to secure her second Rising Star nomination.

== Statistics ==
Statistics are correct to the end of the 2025 season.

Legend
G	Goals	K	Kicks	D	Disposals	T	Tackles
B	Behinds	H	Handballs	M	Marks

Season	Team	No.	Games	Totals							Averages (per game)							Votes
Season	Team	No.	Games	G	B	K	H	D	M	T	G	B	K	H	D	M	T	Votes
2025	Collingwood	16	8	6	5	61	51	112	26	23	0.8	0.6	7.6	6.4	14.0	3.3	2.9	4
Career			8	6	5	61	51	112	26	23	0.8	0.6	7.6	6.4	14.0	3.3	2.9	4
