= 2026 AFL Women's Rising Star =

- Sponsored by: Telstra

The 2026 AFL Women's Rising Star award will be presented to the player adjudged the best young player during the 2026 AFL Women's season.

== Eligibility ==
To be eligible for nomination, players must be under 21 years of age on 31 December, have not previously been nominated for the award (unless they have played ten or fewer matches at the beginning of the season) and have not previously won the award. Players who received a suspension during the season are ineligible to win the award, but can be nominated.

Following a suspension for rough conduct, Round Nine nominee Ava Usher is ineligible to win the award.

== Nominations ==
Key
*	Ineligible to win the Rising Star due to suspension.

Table of nominees
Round	Player	Club	Ref.
1	Sierra Grieves	Richmond	
2	Alannah Welsh	Gold Coast	
3	Lauren Young	Port Adelaide	
4	Jordyn Allen	Melbourne	
5	Jade McLay	St Kilda	
6	Olivia Wolmarans	Richmond	
7	Dekota Baron	Gold Coast	
8	Ash Centra	Collingwood	
9	Ava Usher*	Gold Coast	
10	Chloe Bown	Adelaide	
11	Chantal Mason	Geelong	
12	Georja Davies	Gold Coast	

Table of nominations by club
Number	Club	Player	Round
4	Gold Coast	Alannah Welsh	2
4	Gold Coast	Dekota Baron	7
4	Gold Coast	Ava Usher	9
4	Gold Coast	Georja Davies	12
2	Richmond	Sierra Grieves	1
2	Richmond	Olivia Wolmarans	6
1	Adelaide	Chloe Bown	10
1	Collingwood	Ash Centra	8
1	Geelong	Chantal Mason	11
1	Port Adelaide	Lauren Young	3
1	Melbourne	Jordyn Allen	4
1	St Kilda	Jade McLay	5

== See also ==
- 2026 AFL Rising Star
