= Peter McRae (footballer) =

Australian rules footballer

Personal information
- Full name: Peter McRae
- Born: 10 October 1937
- Height: 188 cm (6 ft 2 in)
- Weight: 99 kg (218 lb)

Playing career^{1}
Years	Club	Games (Goals)
1956–57	Footscray	13 (0)
- ^{1} Playing statistics correct to the end of 1957.

Peter McRae (born 10 October 1937) is a former Australian rules footballer who played with Footscray in the Victorian Football League (VFL).

His grandsons Zach and Archer Reid are current AFL players for Essendon and West Coast Eagles respectively.
