= India Rasheed =

Australian rules footballer (born 2006)

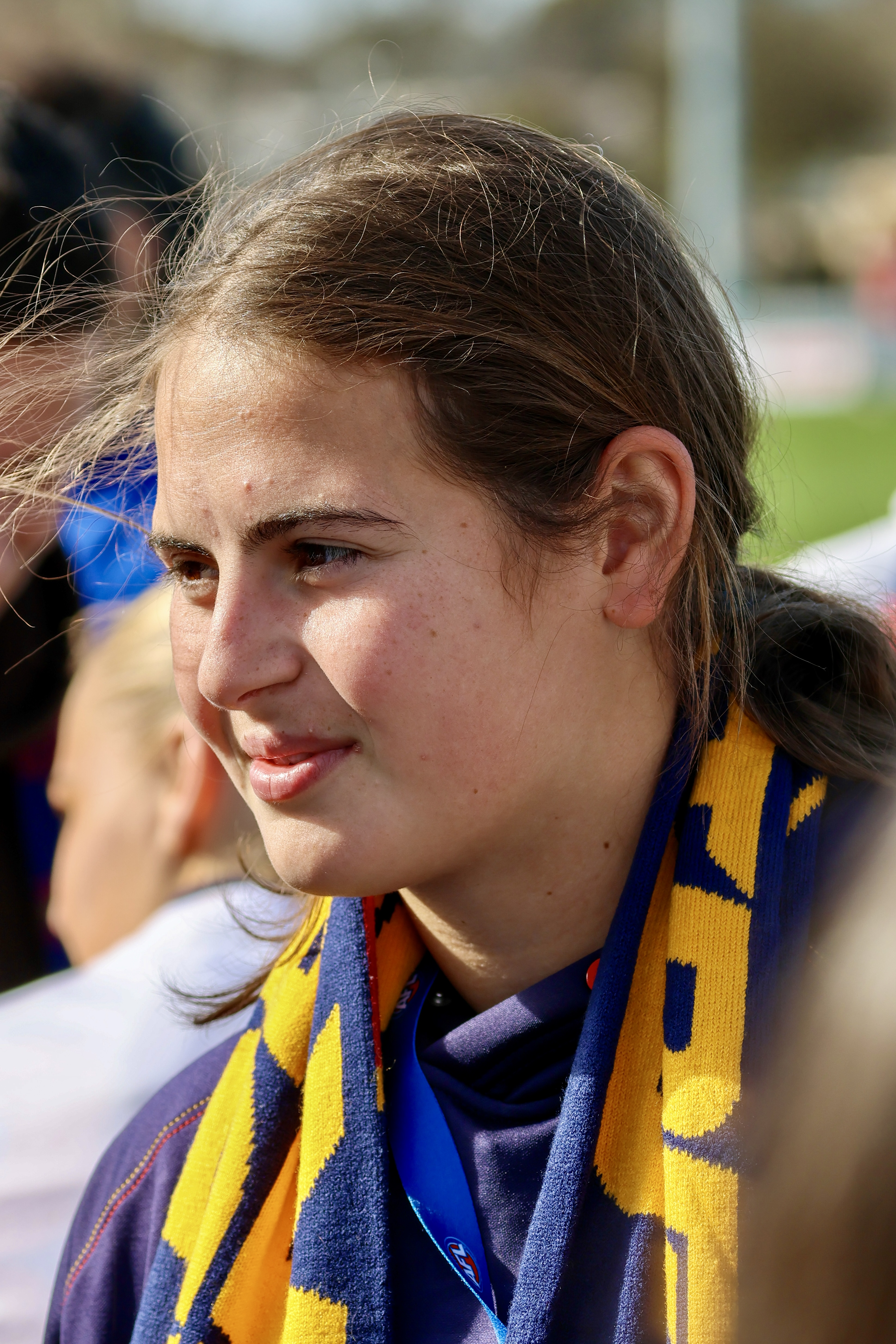
- Rasheed with Adelaide in 2026

Personal information
- Nickname: Itch
- Born: 29 November 2006 (age 19)
- Original teams: Sturt (SANFL); Glenunga (Adelaide Footy League)
- Draft: No. 13, 2024 national draft
- Debut: Round 1, 2025, Adelaide vs. St Kilda, at Moorabbin Oval
- Height: 173 cm (5 ft 8 in)
- Position: Midfielder

Club information
- Current club: Adelaide
- Number: 8

Playing career^{1}
Years	Club	Games (Goals)
2025–	Adelaide	14 (3)
- ^{1} Playing statistics correct to the end of 2025.

Career highlights
- AFL Women's Rising Star nomination: 2025

India Rasheed (born 29 November 2006) is a professional Australian rules football player who currently plays for the Adelaide Crows in the AFL Women's (AFLW).

== Early life ==
Rasheed was born in 2006 to father Roger Rasheed, who is a former tennis coach and player who had a short Australian rules football career with Sturt in the South Australian National Football League (SANFL).

Her uncle is former Port Adelaide and Collingwood player Tyson Goldsack. Rasheed and her family were big fans of Port Adelaide until she was drafted into the league.

Rasheed, originally from Payneham NU until she was 15 and the Glenunga Football Club in the Adelaide Footy League, was a part of the AFLW Academy program. Playing for Sturt at a junior age, she won the SANFLW Breakthrough Player Award in 2024 while also finishing third in the League Best and Fairest Award.

== AFL Women's career ==
Drafted with pick 13 in the 2024 national draft, Rasheed made an instant impact at the Adelaide Crows and earned an early debut in round 1, 2025 against St Kilda. She kicked her first goal in the loss at Moorabbin Oval.

In the round 11 Showdown against Port Adelaide, Rasheed had 14 disposals and 6 marks, earning her a nomination for the 2025 Rising Star award. She later kicked two goals in her first finals match, as her Crows defeated St Kilda in the elimination final.
