= Jacob Schuback =

Australian rules footballer (born 1983)

Personal information
- Full name: Jacob Schuback
- Born: 28 November 1983 (age 42); Sale, Victoria
- Original team: Sale / Gippsland Power
- Draft: 59th, 2001 National Draft
- Height: 180 cm (5 ft 11 in)
- Weight: 80 kg (176 lb)
- Position: Small Forward

Playing career^{1}
Years	Club	Games (Goals)
2003–2004	Adelaide	7 (4)
- ^{1} Playing statistics correct to the end of 2004.

Jacob Schuback (born 28 November 1983) is an Australian rules footballer who played with Adelaide in the Australian Football League (AFL).

A small forward, Schuback came to Adelaide from the Gippsland Power, but originally played for Sale Magpies. He made just one appearance in the 2003 AFL season and put together six senior games in 2004, until suffering a shoulder injury. In 2005 he spent the entire season at Glenelg, not able to earn a call up to the Adelaide team due to constant shoulder trouble. He was delisted at the end of the 2005 season and returned to Sale Magpies.
