= Gippsland Power =

Australian rules football talent development club

Names
- Full name: Gippsland Power
- Nickname: Power

Club details
- Founded: 1993; 33 years ago
- Colours: Red; White; Blue
- Competition: Talent League: Boys; Talent League Girls: Girls
- Coach: Boys: Kris Pendlebury; Girls: Michael Farmer
- Premierships: Talent League: (2); 2005, 2026; Talent League Girls: (0)
- Ground: Morwell Recreation Reserve, Morwell

Other information
- Official website: Gippsland Power

Gippsland Power is an Australian rules football talent development club based in Morwell, Victoria. The club competes in the Talent League, fielding boys and girls teams representing the Gippsland region of Victoria.

Established in 1993, Gippsland has produced numerous players who have progressed to the Australian Football League (AFL) and AFL Women's competitions. The Power's boys team has won two Talent League premierships, defeating the Dandenong Stingrays in both the 2005 and 2026 Grand Finals.

== History ==
Gippsland Power entered the TAC Cup in 1993 as one of four country-based programs to join the statewide under-18 competition that year, alongside the Bendigo Pioneers, Ballarat Rebels and Murray Bushrangers. Peter Francis joined the club in late 1994 and coached the Power for six seasons. Under Francis, Gippsland reached its first Grand Final in 1999, where it finished runner-up to the Sandringham Dragons. Francis subsequently became the club's talent manager, a position he held for 19 years.

Gippsland won its first premiership in 2005 under first-year coach Paul Hudson. After finishing on top of the ladder, the Power defeated the Calder Cannons by 77 points in its opening final and the Northern Knights by 10 points in the preliminary final. Gippsland then defeated the Dandenong Stingrays 12.9 (81) to 10.6 (66) in the Grand Final at the Melbourne Cricket Ground. Dale Thomas kicked four goals and was awarded the TAC Medal as the best player on the ground. The premiership team also included future AFL players Scott Pendlebury, Xavier Ellis, Tyson Goldsack and Brent Macaffer. Thomas, Ellis and Pendlebury were subsequently selected with picks two, three and five respectively in the 2005 AFL draft.

The Power returned to the Grand Final in 2010, losing to the Calder Cannons 17.14 (116) to 8.10 (58). Two years later, Gippsland reached its fourth Grand Final and was defeated by the Oakleigh Chargers by one point. Scores were level at 81 apiece at full time before Oakleigh's Jackson Macrae kicked the match-winning behind in extra time.

Former Gippsland player Leigh Brown became head coach in 2014 and remained in the role for five seasons. In 2017, Brown was named TAC Cup Coach of the Year, becoming the first Gippsland Power head coach to receive the award. During this period the club's talent pathway expanded beyond its under-18 boys program, including the establishment of its girls team in 2017.

Rhett McLennan became head coach of the boys program in 2019 and remained in the position through the 2025 season. During his tenure, Gippsland won minor premierships in 2022 and 2025 and reached preliminary finals in 2019, 2022, 2023 and 2025. McLennan became the longest-serving head coach in the club's history before departing to coach the Casey Demons in the Victorian Football League ahead of the 2026 season. During his tenure the competition was renamed from the NAB League to the Coates Talent League in 2023.

=== 2026 premiership ===
In 2026, Gippsland appointed former Power player Kris Pendlebury as coach of its boys program. The Power finished fifth on the overall home-and-away ladder and qualified for the finals through the wildcard round.

Gippsland defeated the Murray Bushrangers 18.14 (122) to 7.4 (46) in the wildcard round and the Tasmania Devils 18.18 (126) to 13.10 (88) in the quarter-final. The Power then defeated the Sandringham Dragons 10.11 (71) to 10.9 (69) in the preliminary final to qualify for its first Grand Final since 2012.

In the Grand Final at Whitten Oval on 19 September, Gippsland defeated the Dandenong Stingrays 16.10 (106) to 10.11 (71), winning its second premiership and its first since 2005. Wil Malady and Cody Templeton each kicked five goals, while Judd Burgiel recorded 29 disposals.

== Girls program ==
Gippsland Power has fielded a girls team since the establishment of the TAC Cup Girls competition in 2017. Gippsland was one of the 12 inaugural clubs in the statewide under-18 girls competition, which was introduced as a talent pathway to the AFL Women's competition.

The program has produced a number of players who have progressed to the AFL Women's competition. Tyla Hanks was drafted by Melbourne following the 2018 season.

In 2024, Ash Centra became the first Gippsland Power player to win the Talent League Girls best and fairest award, polling 25 votes. The girls team is coached by Michael Farmer in 2026.

== Honours ==
=== Boys ===
- Premierships (2): 2005, 2026
- Runners-up (3): 1999, 2010, 2012
- Minor premierships (4): 2005, 2007, 2022, 2025

==== Individual honours ====
- Morrish Medal: Matthew Stolarczyk (1999), Jarryd Blair (2008), Dyson Heppell (2010), Nick Graham (2012), Josh Scott (2013), Alex Carr (2014)
- TAC Cup Coach Award: Jason McFarlane (1994), Steven Hazelman (1998), Leigh Brown (1999), Shaun Marusic (2011)
- Grand Final best-on-ground: Dale Thomas (2005)

=== Girls ===
==== Individual honours ====
- Talent League Girls best and fairest: Ash Centra (2024)

== Draft and recruitment history ==
=== AFL draftees ===
Players selected from Gippsland Power in the AFL National Draft or Rookie Draft include:

- 1993: Mark Stevens, Craig Biddiscombe, Ben Robbins
- 1994: Robert McMahon, Tim Elliott
- 1995: Mark Bradley
- 1996: Brett Knowles
- 1997: Callum Chambers, Greg Tivendale, Brent Cowell, Hayden Burgiel
- 1998: Damien Adkins, David Wojcinski, Adrian Cox, Danny O'Brien, Don Webb
- 1999: Leigh Brown, Robert Murphy, Shannon O'Brien, Joe Allen, Leigh Sheehan
- 2000: Luke Ablett, Shane Birss
- 2001: Jason Gram, Jacob Schuback, Nick Greenwood
- 2002: Brendon Goddard, Jason Winderlich, Matthew Ferguson, Sean Dempster
- 2003: Ryan Murphy, Sam Pleming
- 2004: Jarryd Roughead, Andrew McQualter, Dean Polo
- 2005: Dale Thomas, Xavier Ellis, Scott Pendlebury, Trent West, Jay Neagle, Craig Flint
- 2006: Lachlan Hansen, Tyson Goldsack, Brent Macaffer, Ben Hughes, Robert Eddy
- 2007: Dan McKenna, Brent Connelly
- 2008: Nick Heyne, Campbell Heath, Jarryd Blair, Tristan Francis
- 2009: John Butcher, Koby Stevens, Nathan Vardy, Jack Weston, Mitch Golby
- 2010: Dyson Heppell, Jed Lamb, Dean MacDonald, Michael Ross
- 2011: Sam Docherty, Clay Smith, Josh Tynan, Danny Butcher, Jordan Staley
- 2012: Nick Graham, Tim Membrey
- 2013: Jack Leslie
- 2014: Jordan Cunico, Lukas Webb
- 2015: Harry McKay, Ben McKay, Josh Dunkley, Sam Skinner, Tom Papley
- 2016: Ben Ainsworth
- 2017: Callum Porter
- 2018: Xavier Duursma, Irving Mosquito, Noah Gown
- 2019: Caleb Serong, Sam Flanders, Charlie Comben, Brock Smith, Leo Connolly, Fraser Phillips
- 2020: Zach Reid, Ryan Angwin, Sam Berry
- 2021: Jai Serong
- 2022: Bailey Humphrey, Jacob Konstanty, Cooper Vickery, Coby Burgiel, Max Knobel
- 2023: Zane Duursma, Wil Dawson, Archer Reid, Tew Jiath, Lachlan Smith
- 2024: Alix Tauru, Xavier Lindsay, Asher Eastham
- 2025: Willem Duursma, Thomas Matthews

=== Other AFL list entries ===
Other players have joined AFL lists directly from Gippsland Power through alternative list-entry mechanisms:

- 1994: Trent Churchill – Footscray, pre-draft supplementary selection; Anthony Ljubic – Fremantle, pre-draft concession selection
- 2001: Dylan McLaren – Brisbane Lions, pre-season draft (pick 9)
- 2007: Ben Ross – Kangaroos, pre-season draft (pick 3)
- 2010: Tomas Bugg – Greater Western Sydney, 17-year-old access selection
- 2013: Will Hams – Essendon, pre-season draft (pick 6)
- 2017: Changkuoth Jiath – Hawthorn, Category B rookie through the club's Next Generation Academy
- 2019: Harry Pepper – Hawthorn, Category B rookie through the club's Next Generation Academy
- 2023: Ryan Maric – West Coast Eagles, mid-season rookie draft (pick 1)
- 2024: Tom Hanily – Sydney Swans, mid-season rookie draft (pick 14); Ricky Mentha – Melbourne, Category B rookie through the club's Next Generation Academy
- 2025: Zac Walker – Western Bulldogs, mid-season rookie draft (pick 12)

=== AFLW draftees ===
- 2017: Darcy Guttridge, Holly Whitford (rookie)
- 2018: Tyla Hanks
- 2020: Megan Fitzsimon
- 2022: Yasmin Duursma
- 2023: Amber Schutte
- 2024: Ash Centra
- 2025: Chelsea Sutton, Abby Hobson, Baia Pugh
