= Heidi Talbot (footballer) =

Personal information
- Full name: Heidi Talbot
- Born: 18 December 2006 (age 19)
- Original teams: Bond University (QAFLW); North Cairns (AFL Cairns)
- Draft: No. 27, 2024 AFLW draft
- Height: 160 cm (5 ft 3 in)
- Position: Utility

Club information
- Current club: Gold Coast
- Number: 21

Playing career^{1}
Years	Club	Games (Goals)
2025–	Gold Coast	8 (0)
- ^{1} Playing statistics correct to the end of Round 8, 2026.

Heidi Talbot is a professional Australian rules footballer who was selected by the Gold Coast Suns with the 27th pick in the 2024 AFL Women's draft.

== Early life ==
Talbot is of Torres Strait Islander (Ait Koedal) descent and spent the early years of her life in Saibai Island before moving to Cairns. She was a talented athlete in her younger years and excelled in both Australian rules football and field hockey. She was coached by Cairns football icon Jo Butland in her younger years while playing for the North Cairns Tigers.

== AFLW career ==
Talbot was drafted to the Gold Coast Suns with the 27th selection in the 2024 AFL Women's draft. As of 2025, she is the only Torres Strait Islander in either the AFL or AFLW competitions. She made her AFLW debut in round 1 of the 2026 AFLW season.
