= Megan Fitzsimon =

Australian rules footballer

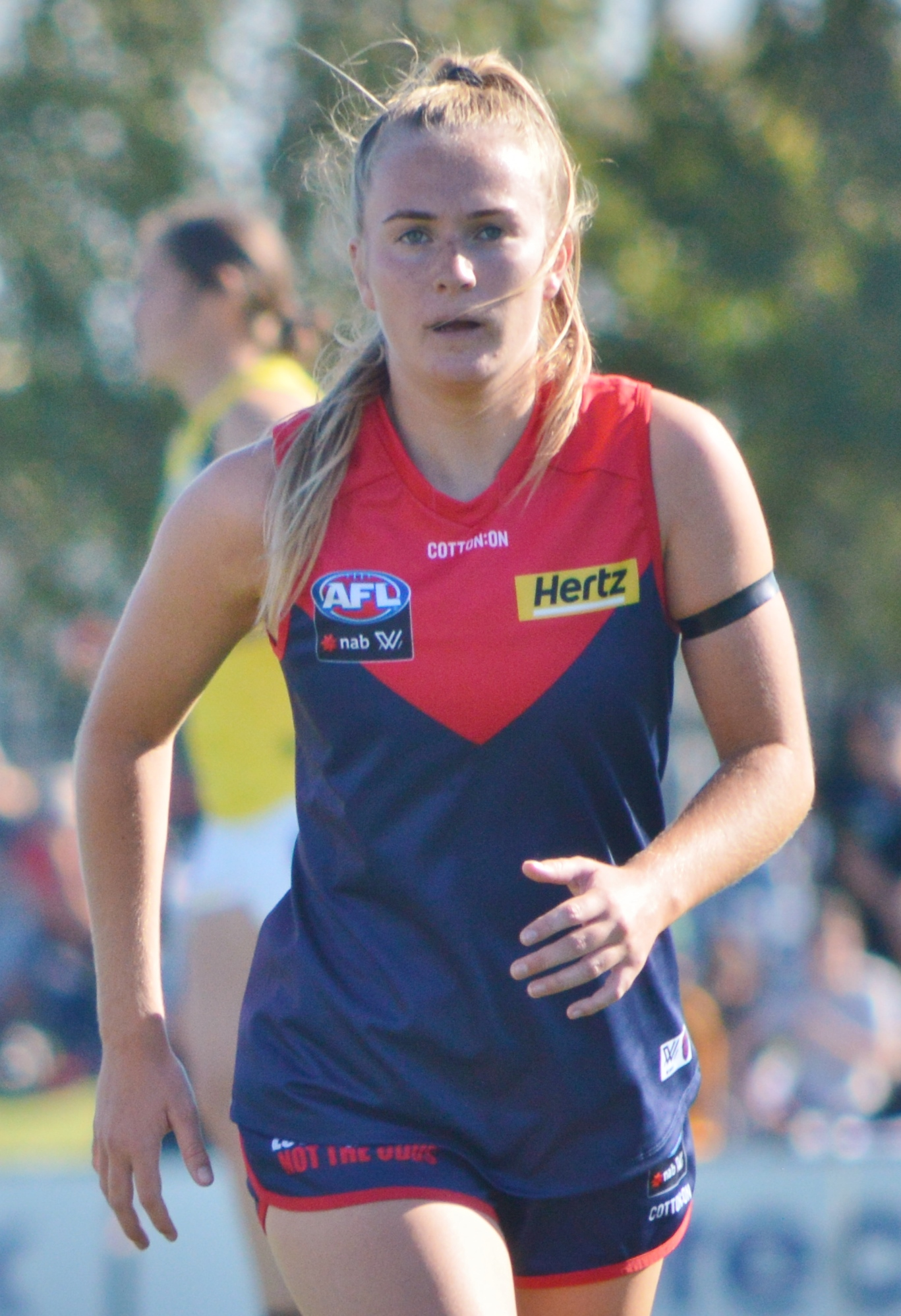
- Fitzsimon with Melbourne in February 2021

Personal information
- Born: 10 August 2002 (age 24); Bairnsdale
- Original team: Gippsland Power (NAB League Girls)
- Draft: No. 35, 2020 national draft
- Debut: Round 1, 2021, Melbourne vs. Gold Coast, at Metricon Stadium
- Height: 169 cm (5 ft 7 in)
- Position: Midfield / forward

Club information
- Current club: Melbourne
- Number: 24

Playing career^{1}
Years	Club	Games (Goals)
2021–	Melbourne	34 (6)
- ^{1} Playing statistics correct to the end of the 2023 season.

Career highlights
- AFLW premiership player: Season 7 (2022)

Megan Fitzsimon (born 10 August 2002) is an Australian rules footballer playing for the Melbourne Football Club in the AFL Women's competition (AFLW). After a junior career with the Gippsland Power in the NAB League Girls competition, Fitzsimon was selected by Melbourne with the club's fourth selection and the thirty fifth selection overall in the 2020 AFL Women's draft. She made her debut against Gold Coast at Metricon Stadium in the opening round of the 2021 season.
