= Havana Harris =

- Harris in November 2026

Personal information
- Full name: Havana Harris
- Born: 1 July 2006 (age 20); Gold Coast, Queensland
- Original teams: Bond University (QAFLW); Burleigh Bombettes (QFAW)
- Draft: No. 2, 2024 AFLW draft
- Height: 182 cm (6 ft 0 in)
- Position: Utility

Club information
- Current club: Gold Coast

Playing career^{1}
Years	Club	Games (Goals)
2025–	Gold Coast	25 (31)
- ^{1} Playing statistics correct to the end of 2026.

Career highlights
- 2025 AFL Women's Rising Star nomination; 2× Gold Coast leading goalkicker: 2025, 2026

Havana Harris is a professional Australian rules footballer who was selected by the Gold Coast Suns with the second pick in the 2024 AFL Women's draft.

== Early life ==
Harris was born on the Gold Coast, Queensland, to parents Samantha née Hughes and Jonathan. Her mother was a junior netballer who transitioned to marathon running, winning the Gold Coast Marathon in 2000 and the Melbourne Marathon in 2001, whilst her father was a professional basketballer who played for the Gold Coast Rollers in the National Basketball League in the 1990s, before later becoming a sergeant at the Coolangatta Police Station. She has one brother, Jonah, who is a member of the Gold Coast Suns Academy. Her second cousin is Australian tennis player Nicole Pratt.

Harris attended Varsity College from prep to Year 12. She began her sports journey in athletics where she was an elite runner and was crowned under-12 national champion in high jump. Harris was invited to play Australian rules football by her school for the first time at the age of 13 and would later go on to lead Varsity College to an AFL Queensland State Championship win in 2022. She also played junior football for the Burleigh Bombettes and later switched clubs to play in the top state QAFLW competition for Bond University and was voted Best on Ground in their 2023 QAFLW Grand Final victory. She was represented Queensland multiple times throughout her junior football career and was named in the U18 All-Australian team in back-to-back years after two outstanding performances in the U18 National Championships.

== AFLW career ==
Harris was drafted to her hometown team, the Gold Coast Suns, with the second selection in the 2024 AFL Women's draft after matching a bid from Melbourne.
