= Zippy Fish =

Australian rules footballer

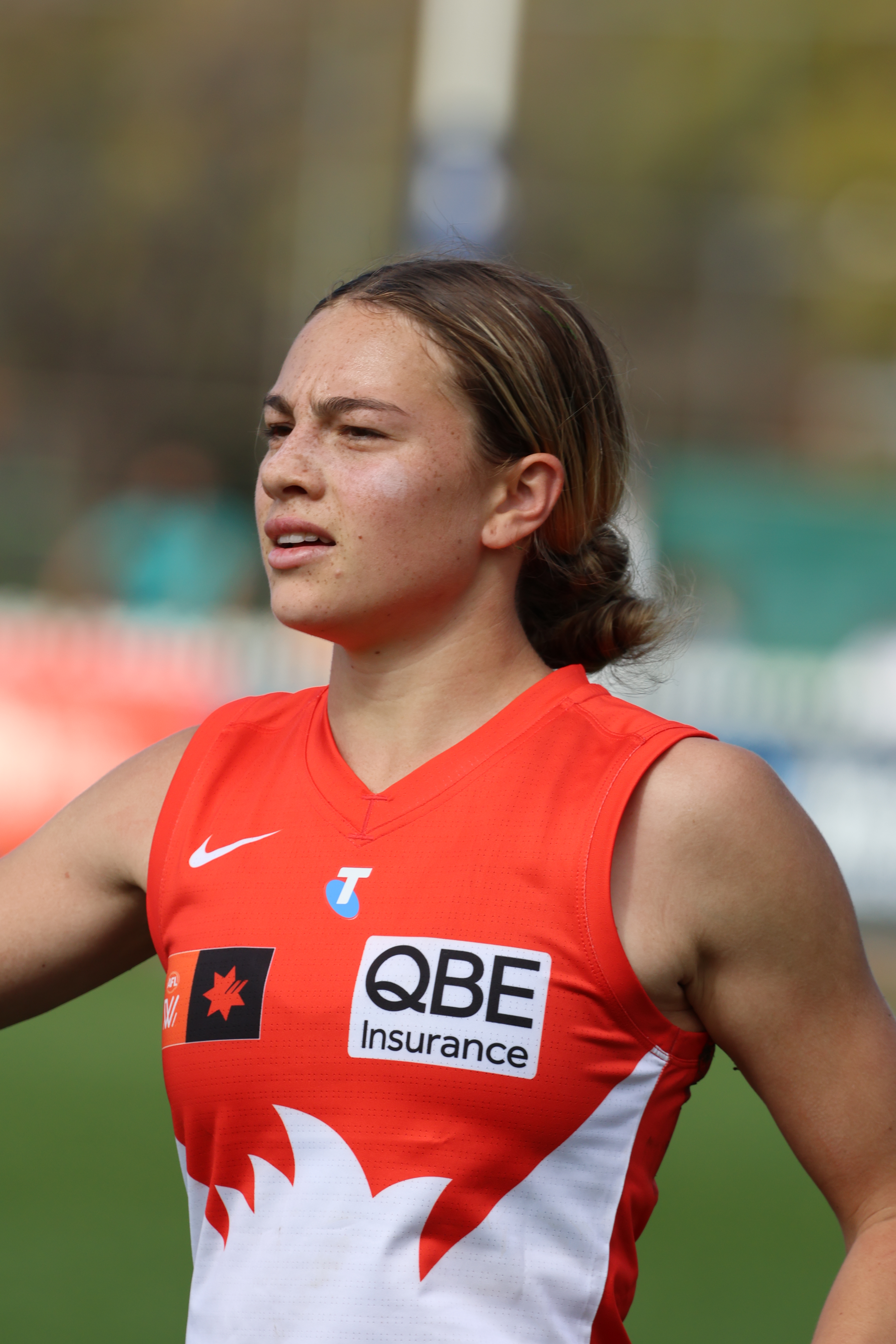
- Fish in 2026

Personal information
- Full name: Zipporah Fish
- Born: 4 June 2006 (age 20)
- Original team: East Fremantle
- Draft: No. 5, 2024 AFL Women's National draft
- Height: 160 cm (5 ft 3 in)
- Position: Midfielder / half back

Club information
- Current club: Sydney
- Number: 23

Playing career^{1}
Years	Club	Games (Goals)
2025–	Sydney	27 (4)

Representative team honours^{2}
Years	Team	Games (Goals)
2026	Australia	1 (1)
- ^{1} Playing statistics correct to the end of 2026.^{2} Representative statistics correct as of 2026.

Career highlights
- 2x 22under22 team: 2025, 2026; AFLPA best first-year player: 2025; AFL Women's Rising Star: 2025

Zipporah "Zippy" Fish (born 4 June 2006) is an Australian rules footballer who plays for the Sydney Swans in the AFL Women's (AFLW). Although traditionally a midfielder, she also plays at half back. She was awarded the AFLPA best first-year player for 2025 and won the 2025 AFL Women's Rising Star.

== Early life ==
Fish is from Newman, a small town in the Pilbara region of Western Australia. Her first name, Zipporah, is of biblical origin. Her father Troy played a few league games for Peel Thunder in the West Australian Football League (WAFL) and some reserves games for Port Adelaide in the South Australian National Football League (SANFL), before switching to junior coaching and player development roles with East Fremantle.

Originally focusing mostly on basketball and soccer, Fish first started playing Australian rules football for East Fremantle in the Rogers Cup, a developmental league for female footballers under the age of 19 in Western Australia. She attended secondary school at All Saints' College in Perth, graduating in 2023. During her gap year, she began studying for a teaching degree specialising in sport, whilst also working as a game development officer for the West Australian Football Commission (WAFC) running school clinics and carnivals.

== AFLW career ==
=== 2025: Debut season ===
A highly rated junior, Fish was a member of Fremantle's Next Generation Academy and the AFLW Academy programs and was considered a top-five draft prospect. She was drafted by Sydney with pick 5 in the 2024 AFL Women's National draft, and was named to make her debut in Round 1 of the 2025 AFL Women's season against Richmond. She collected 26 disposals during the match, the equal-most from a debutante, and was listed as one of Sydney's best players in the subsequent match report. She received a Rising Star nomination the following week in Round 2 playing against the Gold Coast Suns, recording 27 disposals and eight intercepts.

In Round 8 against reigning premiers North Melbourne, she recorded a game-high 722 metres gained and career-best numbers in both disposals and kicks, with 34 and 25, respectively. She was also the only Swans' player to receive coaches' votes from the game. Two weeks later on 17 October, she was named as one of the favorites to win the 2025 AFL Women's Rising Star award. Fish finished her first season in the competition having played all 12 games, polling coaches' votes in all but three of them. She received selection in the 22 Under 22 team, and was also named in the initial 42-woman All-Australian squad. On 24 November at the league's annual W Awards, Fish was awarded the Rising Star award as the competition's best young player, polling the maximum 50 votes. She was also awarded the AFLPA best first-year player award in November.

=== 2026 ===
In June, Fish was selected to represent Australia in the then-upcoming Australia v Ireland representative game. She kicked the first goal of the match, with Australia going on to win the game by 50 points.

== Statistics ==
Updated to the end of 2026.

Legend
G	Goals	K	Kicks	D	Disposals	T	Tackles
B	Behinds	H	Handballs	M	Marks

Season	Team	No.	Games	Totals							Averages (per game)							Votes
Season	Team	No.	Games	G	B	K	H	D	M	T	G	B	K	H	D	M	T	Votes
2025	Sydney	23	12	4	0	190	64	254	37	40	0.3	0.0	15.8	5.3	21.2	3.1	3.3	4
2026	Sydney	23	15	0	1	216	98	314	37	68	0.0	0.1	14.4	6.5	20.9	2.5	4.5	-
Career			27	4	1	406	162	568	74	108	0.1	0.1	15.0	6.0	21.0	2.7	4.0	4

== Honours & achievements ==
Team

- McClelland Trophy: (Sydney) 2026

Individual

- 2x 22under22 team: 2025, 2026
- AFLPA Best First Year Player: 2025
- AFL Women's Rising Star: 2025
