= 2025 AFL Women's season =

Tenth season of the AFL Women's (AFLW) competition

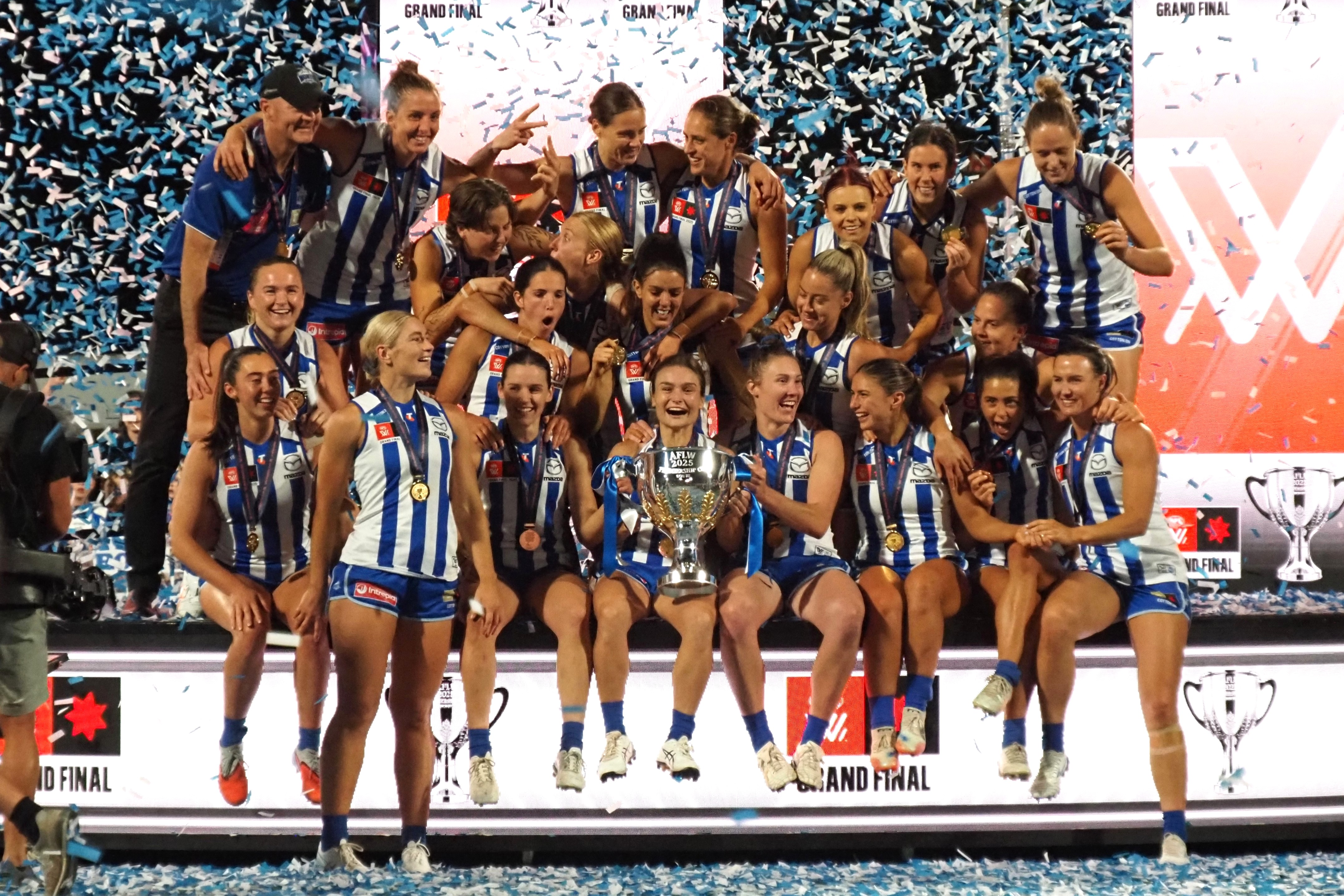
- North Melbourne players celebrate after winning the 2025 AFL Women's Grand Final

Overview
- Date: 14 August – 29 November 2025
- Teams: 18
- Premiers: North Melbourne; 2nd premiership
- Runners-up: Brisbane; 5th runners-up result
- Minor premiers: North Melbourne; 2nd minor premiership
- Best and fairest: Ash Riddell (North Melbourne); 23 votes
- Leading goalkicker: Indy Tahau (Port Adelaide); 25 goals

Attendance
- Matches played: 117
- Total attendance: 317,422 (2,713 per match)
- Highest (H&A): 8,042 (round 1, Carlton v Collingwood)
- Highest (finals): 12,741 (grand final, North Melbourne v Brisbane)

The 2025 AFL Women's season was the tenth season of the AFL Women's (AFLW) competition, the highest-level senior women's Australian rules football competition in Australia. The season featured 18 clubs and ran from 14 August to 29 November, comprising a twelve-round home-and-away season followed by a four-week finals series featuring the top eight clubs.

North Melbourne won the premiership, defeating Brisbane by 40 points in the 2025 AFL Women's Grand Final; it was North Melbourne's second (consecutive and overall) AFL Women's premiership. North Melbourne won the minor premiership by finishing atop the home-and-away ladder with a perfect 12–0 win–loss record and won all three of its finals, completing a perfect season. North Melbourne's Ash Riddell won the AFL Women's best and fairest award as the league's best and fairest player, while Port Adelaide's Indy Tahau won the AFL Women's leading goalkicker award as the league's leading goalkicker.

== Background ==
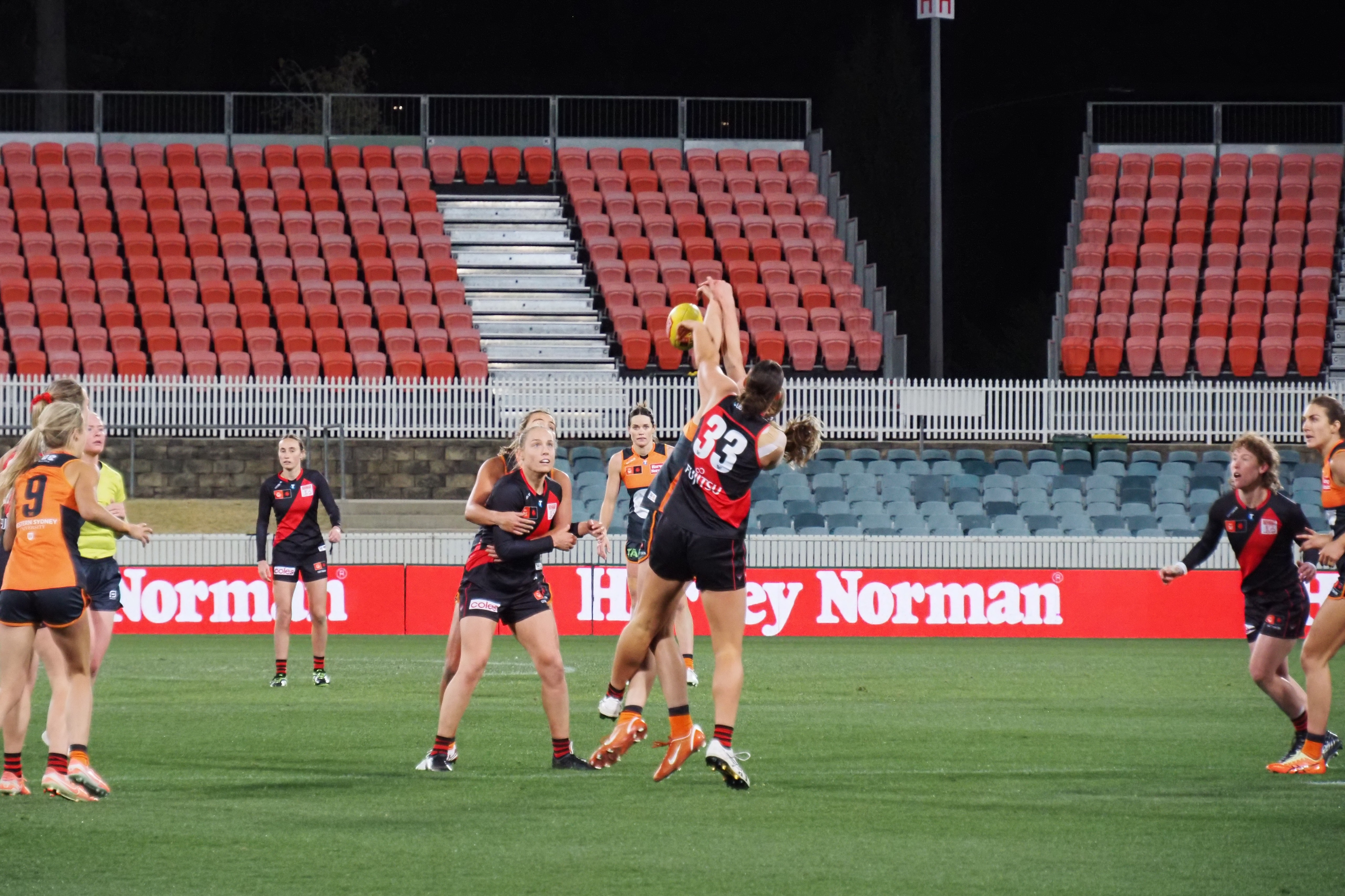
Greater Western Sydney and Essendon players contest the football in round 1

In September 2024, Australian Football League (AFL) chief executive officer Andrew Dillon announced that the 2025 season would have an earlier start date than previous seasons to accommodate an extra home-and-away match, and in November, AFL executive general manager Laura Kane announced that a twelve-match home-and-away season would be played over twelve weeks in 2025, abandoning the strategy of a compressed fixture trialled in 2024 where eleven matches were played over ten weeks.

== Coach appointments ==
New coach	Club	Date of appointment	Previous coach	Ref.
Rhyce Shaw	Gold Coast	21 January 2025	Cameron Joyce	

== Club leadership ==
Club	Coach	Leadership group		
Club	Coach	Captain(s)	Vice-captain(s)	Other leader(s)
Adelaide	Matthew Clarke	Sarah Allan, Ebony Marinoff		Jess Allan, Chelsea Biddell, Anne Hatchard, Eloise Jones
Brisbane	Craig Starcevich	Breanna Koenen	Belle Dawes, Nat Grider	Ally Anderson, Sophie Conway, Jade Ellenger, Cathy Svarc, Ruby Svarc
Carlton	Mathew Buck	Abbie McKay	Mimi Hill	Tara Bohanna, Harriet Cordner
Collingwood	Sam Wright	Ruby Schleicher	Jordyn Allen	Lauren Butler, Mikala Cann
Essendon	Natalie Wood	Steph Cain, Bonnie Toogood	Maddi Gay	Bess Keaney, Steph Wales
Fremantle	Lisa Webb	Ange Stannett	Ashleigh Brazill	Hayley Miller, Gabby Newton, Emma O'Driscoll, Áine Tighe
Geelong	Daniel Lowther	Meg McDonald	Amy McDonald, Nina Morrison	
Gold Coast	Rhyce Shaw	Niamh McLaughlin, Lucy Single		Georgia Clayden, Meara Girvan, Lily Mithen, Charlie Rowbottom, Jamie Stanton
Greater Western Sydney	Cameron Bernasconi	Rebecca Beeson	Tarni Evans, Alyce Parker, Katherine Smith	
Hawthorn	Daniel Webster	Emily Bates	Eliza West	Jasmine Fleming, Tilly Lucas-Rodd, Áine McDonagh, Jenna Richardson
Melbourne	Mick Stinear	Kate Hore	Tyla Hanks	Sarah Lampard, Paxy Paxman
North Melbourne	Darren Crocker	Jasmine Garner	Ash Riddell	Libby Birch, Nicole Bresnehan, Bella Eddey, Jasmine Ferguson
Port Adelaide	Lauren Arnell	Justine Mules-Robinson	Amelie Borg, Julia Teakle	Kirsty Lamb
Richmond	Ryan Ferguson	Katie Brennan	Tessa Lavey, Gabby Seymour	Monique Conti, Beth Lynch, Ellie McKenzie
St Kilda	Nick Dal Santo	Hannah Priest	Serene Watson	Nicola Barr, Molly McDonald, Georgia Patrikios, Tyanna Smith
Sydney	Scott Gowans	Lucy McEvoy, Chloe Molloy		
West Coast	Daisy Pearce	Bella Lewis, Charlie Thomas	Mikayla Western	Alison Drennan, Dana Hooker
Western Bulldogs	Tamara Hyett	Deanna Berry	Ellie Blackburn	Elle Bennetts, Jess Fitzgerald, Elisabeth Georgostathis, Isabella Grant, Isabelle Pritchard, Louise Stephenson

== Pre-season ==
All starting times are local time. Source: afl.com.au (fixture; results/report)

	Official practice matches
Saturday, 2 August (9:00 am)	Fremantle 1.9 (15)	def. by	St Kilda 2.10 (22)	Victor George Kailis Oval
Saturday, 2 August (12:00 pm)	North Melbourne 15.5 (95)	def.	Essendon 2.2 (14)	Avalon Airport Oval
Saturday, 2 August (12:05 pm)	Greater Western Sydney 6.3 (39)	def. by	Carlton 8.12 (60)	Blacktown ISP Oval
Saturday, 2 August (12:30 pm)	Brisbane 7.7 (49)	def.	Sydney 5.6 (36)	Brighton Homes Arena
Saturday, 2 August (8:00 pm)	Gold Coast 1.3 (9)	def. by	Geelong 10.7 (67)	People First Stadium
Saturday, 2 August (6:15 pm)	West Coast 4.4 (28)	drew with	Western Bulldogs 4.4 (28)	Mineral Resources Park
Sunday, 3 August (11:00 am)	Adelaide 5.8 (38)	def. by	Melbourne 8.4 (52)	Thomas Farms Oval
Sunday, 3 August (12:00 pm)	Richmond 6.2 (38)	def. by	Hawthorn 10.15 (75)	Ikon Park
Sunday, 3 August (1:30 pm)	Port Adelaide 2.4 (16)	def. by	Collingwood 3.12 (30)	Alberton Oval

== Home-and-away season ==
All starting times are local time. Source: afl.com.au

=== Round 1 ===
	Round 1
Thursday, 14 August (7:15 pm)	Carlton 6.9 (45)	def.	Collingwood 3.3 (21)	Ikon Park (crowd: 8,042)	Report; Stats
Thursday, 14 August (7:15 pm)	West Coast 5.5 (35)	def.	Gold Coast 2.8 (20)	Mineral Resources Park (crowd: 1,453)	Report; Stats
Friday, 15 August (6:15 pm)	Sydney 8.10 (58)	def.	Richmond 5.8 (38)	North Sydney Oval (crowd: 4,126)	Report; Stats
Saturday, 16 August (3:35 pm)	Geelong 3.3 (21)	def. by	North Melbourne 8.3 (51)	GMHBA Stadium (crowd: 2,764)	Report; Stats
Saturday, 16 August (5:35 pm)	Greater Western Sydney 3.11 (29)	def. by	Essendon 13.7 (85)	Corroboree Group Oval (crowd: 2,258)	Report; Stats
Saturday, 16 August (7:35 pm)	Western Bulldogs 1.8 (14)	def. by	Melbourne 9.8 (62)	Mission Whitten Oval (crowd: 3,278)	Report; Stats
Sunday, 17 August (12:40 pm)	Brisbane 3.11 (29)	def. by	Hawthorn 4.9 (33)	Brighton Homes Arena (crowd: 4,208)	Report; Stats
Sunday, 17 August (2:10 pm)	St Kilda 6.5 (41)	def.	Adelaide 2.7 (19)	RSEA Park (crowd: 1,670)	Report; Stats
Sunday, 17 August (3:40 pm)	Port Adelaide 3.6 (24)	def. by	Fremantle 7.4 (46)	Alberton Oval (crowd: 2,873)	Report; Stats
The West Coast v Gold Coast match was originally scheduled to be played at Sullivan Logistics Stadium, but was moved to Mineral Resources Park due to safety concerns over the former's playing surface following frequent usage and persistent rainfall.; Essendon's score of 13.7 (85) against Greater Western Sydney was its highest ever.

=== Round 2 ===
	Round 2
Saturday, 23 August (1:05 pm)	Collingwood 4.9 (33)	def.	Greater Western Sydney 4.1 (25)	Victoria Park (crowd: 1,542)	Report; Stats
Saturday, 23 August (3:05 pm)	Melbourne 13.11 (89)	def.	St Kilda 2.3 (15)	Casey Fields (crowd: 2,152)	Report; Stats
Saturday, 23 August (3:05 pm)	Gold Coast 3.3 (21)	def. by	Sydney 15.13 (103)	People First Stadium (crowd: 1,851)	Report; Stats
Saturday, 23 August (3:05 pm)	Fremantle 5.5 (35)	def. by	Brisbane 17.3 (105)	Fremantle Community Bank Oval (crowd: 2,103)	Report; Stats
Saturday, 23 August (7:15 pm)	Hawthorn 3.12 (30)	def.	Carlton 2.10 (22)	Kinetic Stadium (crowd: 2,214)	Report; Stats
Sunday, 24 August (12:35 pm)	Richmond 3.3 (21)	def. by	Western Bulldogs 6.6 (42)	Ikon Park (crowd: 1,760)	Report; Stats
Sunday, 24 August (1:05 pm)	North Melbourne 13.9 (87)	def.	Port Adelaide 2.3 (15)	Arden Street Oval (crowd: 2,346)	Report; Stats
Sunday, 24 August (2:35 pm)	Essendon 4.7 (31)	def.	West Coast 4.2 (26)	Windy Hill (crowd: 2,635)	Report; Stats
Sunday, 24 August (2:35 pm)	Adelaide 10.5 (65)	def.	Geelong 3.9 (27)	Thomas Farms Oval (crowd: 3,088)	Report; Stats
The Essendon v West Coast match was moved back from 1:05 pm to 2:35 pm and the Richmond v Western Bulldogs match was moved forward from 3:05 pm to 12:35 pm to allow Bulldogs fans to watch their AFLW and AFL teams play on the same day.; St Kilda's 74-point loss to Melbourne was the biggest in its history.; Chloe Molloy (Sydney) kicked seven goals against Gold Coast, an equal AFLW record.; Sydney's score of 15.13 (103) against Gold Coast was its highest ever, and its 82-point win was the biggest in its history.; Brisbane's score of 17.3 (105) against Fremantle was its highest ever.

=== Round 3 ===
	Round 3 (Indigenous Round week 1)
Friday, 29 August (6:45 pm)	Richmond 3.10 (28)	def. by	Essendon 6.7 (43)	TIO Stadium (crowd: 5,892)	Report; Stats
Saturday, 30 August (1:05 pm)	Greater Western Sydney 2.10 (22)	def. by	Adelaide 7.12 (54)	Henson Park (crowd: 1,556)	Report; Stats
Saturday, 30 August (3:05 pm)	St Kilda 4.4 (28)	def. by	West Coast 6.6 (42)	RSEA Park (crowd: 1,438)	Report; Stats
Saturday, 30 August (3:05 pm)	Geelong 6.9 (45)	def. by	Sydney 7.8 (50)	GMHBA Stadium (crowd: 2,114)	Report; Stats
Saturday, 30 August (4:35 pm)	Port Adelaide 16.12 (108)	def.	Gold Coast 5.10 (40)	Alberton Oval (crowd: 2,162)	Report; Stats
Saturday, 30 August (7:15 pm)	Western Bulldogs 1.4 (10)	def. by	Hawthorn 2.2 (14)	Mission Whitten Oval (crowd: 2,021)	Report; Stats
Sunday, 31 August (1:05 pm)	Collingwood 4.9 (33)	def. by	Melbourne 5.7 (37)	Victoria Park (crowd: 2,794)	Report; Stats
Sunday, 31 August (1:05 pm)	Fremantle 2.2 (14)	def. by	North Melbourne 18.6 (114)	Fremantle Community Bank Oval (crowd: 2,708)	Report; Stats
Sunday, 31 August (5:05 pm)	Brisbane 6.8 (44)	def. by	Carlton 9.4 (58)	Brighton Homes Arena (crowd: 2,805)	Report; Stats
Port Adelaide's score of 16.12 (108) against Gold Coast was the highest in AFLW history (until it was surpassed by North Melbourne the following day), and its 68-point win was the equal-highest in the club's history.; Grace Campbell (Collingwood) had a shot at goal after the final siren to win the match against Melbourne, but kicked a behind.; North Melbourne's score of 18.6 (114) against Fremantle was the highest in AFLW history, and its 100-point win was also a competition record.; North Melbourne's win over Fremantle was its 15th consecutive win, breaking the AFLW record set by Melbourne in 2023.

=== Round 4 ===
	Round 4 (Indigenous Round week 2)
Saturday, 6 September (12:35 pm)	Melbourne 8.9 (57)	def.	Richmond 2.8 (20)	Casey Fields (crowd: 2,000)	Report; Stats
Saturday, 6 September (1:05 pm)	Gold Coast 7.10 (52)	def.	Greater Western Sydney 4.9 (33)	People First Stadium (crowd: 839)	Report; Stats
Saturday, 6 September (3:05 pm)	Carlton 7.7 (49)	def.	Western Bulldogs 4.9 (33)	Ikon Park (crowd: 2,826)	Report; Stats
Saturday, 6 September (7:15 pm)	Hawthorn 5.10 (40)	def.	St Kilda 2.5 (17)	Cazalys Stadium (crowd: 2,017)	Report; Stats
Sunday, 7 September (1:05 pm)	Sydney 9.8 (62)	def.	Fremantle 5.7 (37)	Henson Park (crowd: 4,564)	Report; Stats
Sunday, 7 September (12:35 pm)	Adelaide 6.2 (38)	def. by	Brisbane 6.5 (41)	Norwood Oval (crowd: 1,517)	Report; Stats
Sunday, 7 September (3:05 pm)	North Melbourne 8.10 (58)	def.	Collingwood 2.1 (13)	Arden Street Oval (crowd: 1,931)	Report; Stats
Sunday, 7 September (3:05 pm)	Essendon 4.3 (27)	def. by	Geelong 8.10 (58)	Windy Hill (crowd: 2,359)	Report; Stats
Sunday, 7 September (3:05 pm)	West Coast 10.4 (64)	def.	Port Adelaide 7.3 (45)	Mineral Resources Park (crowd: 1,597)	Report; Stats

=== Round 5 ===
	Round 5
Saturday, 13 September (1:05 pm)	Collingwood 6.7 (43)	def.	Sydney 2.5 (17)	Victoria Park (crowd: 2,685)	Report; Stats
Saturday, 13 September (2:35 pm)	Carlton 10.11 (71)	def.	Gold Coast 4.1 (25)	Ikon Park (crowd: 2,016)	Report; Stats
Saturday, 13 September (2:35 pm)	Port Adelaide 6.7 (43)	def.	Melbourne 5.11 (41)	Alberton Oval (crowd: 2,736)	Report; Stats
Saturday, 13 September (4:35 pm)	Greater Western Sydney 8.2 (50)	def.	Western Bulldogs 3.11 (29)	Corroboree Group Oval (crowd: 2,135)	Report; Stats
Sunday, 14 September (1:05 pm)	Essendon 1.2 (8)	def. by	St Kilda 9.6 (60)	Windy Hill (crowd: 2,640)	Report; Stats
Sunday, 14 September (1:05 pm)	Richmond 4.5 (29)	def. by	Geelong 8.11 (59)	Ikon Park (crowd: 2,351)	Report; Stats
Sunday, 14 September (3:05 pm)	Hawthorn 4.3 (27)	def. by	Adelaide 7.6 (48)	Kinetic Stadium (crowd: 2,401)	Report; Stats
Sunday, 14 September (3:05 pm)	Brisbane 5.6 (36)	def. by	North Melbourne 10.5 (65)	Brighton Homes Arena (crowd: 3,117)	Report; Stats
Sunday, 14 September (3:05 pm)	Fremantle 3.5 (23)	def.	West Coast 2.4 (16)	Fremantle Community Bank Oval (crowd: 2,502)	Report; Stats
Greater Western Sydney's win over the Western Bulldogs ended a 14-match winless streak.

=== Round 6 ===
	Round 6
Saturday, 20 September (12:35 pm)	Collingwood 3.12 (30)	def. by	Hawthorn 5.9 (39)	Victoria Park (crowd: 2,067)	Report; Stats
Saturday, 20 September (12:35 pm)	Port Adelaide 6.4 (40)	def. by	Geelong 6.9 (45)	Alberton Oval (crowd: 2,255)	Report; Stats
Saturday, 20 September (2:35 pm)	North Melbourne 12.7 (79)	def.	Carlton 4.2 (26)	Arden Street Oval (crowd: 2,633)	Report; Stats
Saturday, 20 September (1:05 pm)	Fremantle 9.2 (56)	def.	Essendon 1.2 (8)	Fremantle Community Bank Oval (crowd: 1,580)	Report; Stats
Sunday, 21 September (1:05 pm)	Sydney 6.6 (42)	def. by	Greater Western Sydney 7.7 (49)	Henson Park (crowd: 7,171)	Report; Stats
Sunday, 21 September (1:05 pm)	Melbourne 10.14 (74)	def.	West Coast 3.5 (23)	Casey Fields (crowd: 1,557)	Report; Stats
Sunday, 21 September (3:05 pm)	Western Bulldogs 3.4 (22)	def. by	Brisbane 6.11 (47)	Mission Whitten Oval (crowd: 1,521)	Report; Stats
Sunday, 21 September (3:05 pm)	St Kilda 6.7 (43)	def.	Richmond 5.6 (36)	RSEA Park (crowd: 1,970)	Report; Stats
Sunday, 21 September (5:05 pm)	Gold Coast 5.4 (34)	def. by	Adelaide 7.8 (50)	People First Stadium (crowd: 1,252)	Report; Stats

=== Round 7 ===
	Round 7
Thursday, 25 September (7:15 pm)	Geelong 5.5 (35)	def. by	Hawthorn 6.6 (42)	GMHBA Stadium (crowd: 3,146)	Report; Stats
Friday, 26 September (1:05 pm)	Melbourne 13.15 (93)	def.	Gold Coast 0.6 (6)	Casey Fields (crowd: 1,557)	Report; Stats
Friday, 26 September (3:05 pm)	Essendon 6.5 (41)	def. by	North Melbourne 10.11 (71)	Windy Hill (crowd: 3,184)	Report; Stats
Friday, 26 September (5:05 pm)	Carlton 5.2 (32)	def.	Fremantle 3.5 (23)	Ikon Park (crowd: 2,165)	Report; Stats
Friday, 26 September (7:15 pm)	Western Bulldogs 10.5 (65)	def.	Collingwood 1.2 (8)	Mission Whitten Oval (crowd: 2,016)	Report; Stats
Sunday, 28 September (1:05 pm)	St Kilda 8.5 (53)	def.	Port Adelaide 6.6 (42)	RSEA Park (crowd: 1,776)	Report; Stats
Sunday, 28 September (2:35 pm)	Adelaide 6.5 (41)	def.	Sydney 6.3 (39)	Thomas Farms Oval (crowd: 2,829)	Report; Stats
Sunday, 28 September (3:05 pm)	Brisbane 7.12 (54)	def.	Richmond 3.2 (20)	Brighton Homes Arena (crowd: 3,937)	Report; Stats
Sunday, 28 September (3:05 pm)	West Coast 11.9 (75)	def.	Greater Western Sydney 5.3 (33)	Mineral Resources Park (crowd: 1,457)	Report; Stats
St Kilda trailed Port Adelaide by 27 points at three-quarter time and went on to win, recording the biggest comeback from a three-quarter time deficit in AFLW history.; Ally Anderson (Brisbane) and Ebony Marinoff (Adelaide) played their 100th AFLW matches in round 7, becoming the first players to do so.; West Coast's score of 11.9 (75) against Greater Western Sydney was its highest ever.

=== Round 8 ===
	Round 8
Thursday, 2 October (7:15 pm)	Hawthorn 5.3 (33)	def.	Fremantle 2.6 (18)	Kinetic Stadium (crowd: 1,643)	Report; Stats
Friday, 3 October (7:15 pm)	Melbourne 5.6 (36)	def.	Essendon 3.4 (22)	Ikon Park (crowd: 2,681)	Report; Stats
Saturday, 4 October (1:05 pm)	Greater Western Sydney 2.4 (16)	def. by	St Kilda 4.6 (30)	Henson Park (crowd: 1,519)	Report; Stats
Saturday, 4 October (3:05 pm)	North Melbourne 13.10 (88)	def.	Sydney 3.2 (20)	University of Tasmania Stadium (crowd: 915)	Report; Stats
Saturday, 4 October (5:05 pm)	Gold Coast 2.3 (15)	def. by	Brisbane 11.17 (83)	People First Stadium (crowd: 1,917)	Report; Stats
Saturday, 4 October (6:45 pm)	Port Adelaide 8.6 (54)	def.	Western Bulldogs 5.5 (35)	Alberton Oval (crowd: 2,444)	Report; Stats
Sunday, 5 October (1:05 pm)	Richmond 8.10 (58)	def.	Adelaide 6.11 (47)	Ikon Park (crowd: 1,309)	Report; Stats
Sunday, 5 October (3:05 pm)	Geelong 5.7 (37)	def. by	Carlton 7.13 (55)	GMHBA Stadium (crowd: 2,907)	Report; Stats
Sunday, 5 October (2:05 pm)	West Coast 8.14 (62)	def.	Collingwood 2.5 (17)	Mineral Resources Park (crowd: 2,216)	Report; Stats
Craig Starcevich (Brisbane) coached his 100th AFLW match against Gold Coast, becoming the first coach to do so.; Brisbane's 17 behinds in the match against Gold Coast were the most in an AFLW match.; West Coast's 45-point win over Collingwood was the biggest in its history.

=== Round 9 ===
	Round 9 (Pride Round week 1)
Friday, 10 October (7:15 pm)	Western Bulldogs 10.7 (67)	def.	Essendon 1.4 (10)	Mission Whitten Oval (crowd: 4,234)	Report; Stats
Saturday, 11 October (12:35 pm)	Adelaide 7.6 (48)	def.	West Coast 4.7 (31)	Norwood Oval (crowd: 2,738)	Report; Stats
Saturday, 11 October (3:05 pm)	Geelong 11.6 (72)	def.	Greater Western Sydney 6.9 (45)	GMHBA Stadium (crowd: 2,509)	Report; Stats
Saturday, 11 October (3:05 pm)	Hawthorn 8.12 (60)	def.	Gold Coast 6.1 (37)	Kinetic Stadium (crowd: 2,195)	Report; Stats
Saturday, 11 October (4:05 pm)	Brisbane 9.8 (62)	def.	Port Adelaide 4.9 (33)	Brighton Homes Arena (crowd: 2,685)	Report; Stats
Saturday, 11 October (7:15 pm)	Richmond 2.2 (14)	def. by	North Melbourne 7.8 (50)	Ikon Park (crowd: 2,321)	Report; Stats
Sunday, 12 October (1:05 pm)	Sydney 11.10 (76)	def.	Carlton 5.7 (37)	Henson Park (crowd: 5,043)	Report; Stats
Sunday, 12 October (3:05 pm)	St Kilda 5.5 (35)	def.	Collingwood 1.6 (12)	RSEA Park (crowd: 2,898)	Report; Stats
Sunday, 12 October (2:05 pm)	Fremantle 6.4 (40)	def.	Melbourne 5.5 (35)	Fremantle Community Bank Oval (crowd: 2,137)	Report; Stats

=== Round 10 ===
	Round 10 (Pride Round week 2)
Friday, 17 October (6:45 pm)	Port Adelaide 15.4 (94)	def.	Hawthorn 8.11 (59)	Alberton Oval (crowd: 3,039)	Report; Stats
Friday, 17 October (6:15 pm)	West Coast 7.8 (50)	def.	Geelong 2.7 (19)	Sullivan Logistics Stadium (crowd: 2,428)	Report; Stats
Saturday, 18 October (1:05 pm)	Melbourne 9.11 (65)	def.	Sydney 3.3 (21)	Casey Fields (crowd: 2,277)	Report; Stats
Saturday, 18 October (3:05 pm)	North Melbourne 10.11 (71)	def.	Adelaide 5.1 (31)	Arden Street Oval (crowd: 3,282)	Report; Stats
Saturday, 18 October (3:05 pm)	Greater Western Sydney 6.4 (40)	def. by	Fremantle 6.11 (47)	Henson Park (crowd: 1,105)	Report; Stats
Saturday, 18 October (7:15 pm)	Carlton 5.6 (36)	def. by	St Kilda 7.7 (49)	Ikon Park (crowd: 2,480)	Report; Stats
Sunday, 19 October (1:05 pm)	Essendon 2.4 (16)	def. by	Brisbane 7.12 (54)	Windy Hill (crowd: 1,801)	Report; Stats
Sunday, 19 October (3:05 pm)	Collingwood 5.3 (33)	def. by	Richmond 7.4 (46)	Victoria Park (crowd: 4,057)	Report; Stats
Sunday, 19 October (4:05 pm)	Gold Coast 0.6 (6)	def. by	Western Bulldogs 10.12 (72)	Great Barrier Reef Arena (crowd: 905)	Report; Stats
The aggregate score of 23.15 (153) in the Port Adelaide v Hawthorn match was the highest in AFLW history.; The crowd of 3,282 for the North Melbourne v Adelaide match is the largest crowd for an AFLW match at Arden Street Oval.

=== Round 11 ===
	Round 11
Friday, 24 October (7:05 pm)	Adelaide 6.9 (45)	def. by	Port Adelaide 7.10 (52)	Norwood Oval (crowd: 5,434)	Report; Stats
Saturday, 25 October (1:05 pm)	Sydney 6.7 (43)	def.	West Coast 3.8 (26)	Henson Park (crowd: 4,519)	Report; Stats
Saturday, 25 October (3:05 pm)	Essendon 3.8 (26)	def. by	Hawthorn 7.14 (56)	Windy Hill (crowd: 2,652)	Report; Stats
Saturday, 25 October (2:05 pm)	Fremantle 8.10 (58)	def.	Richmond 2.2 (14)	Fremantle Community Bank Oval (crowd: 2,406)	Report; Stats
Saturday, 25 October (6:15 pm)	Brisbane 6.9 (45)	def.	Melbourne 5.6 (36)	Brighton Homes Arena (crowd: 5,022)	Report; Stats
Sunday, 26 October (1:05 pm)	Western Bulldogs 3.8 (26)	def. by	Geelong 6.1 (37)	Mars Stadium (crowd: 1,332)	Report; Stats
Sunday, 26 October (1:05 pm)	North Melbourne 9.13 (67)	def.	St Kilda 3.3 (21)	North Hobart Oval (crowd: 1,377)	Report; Stats
Sunday, 26 October (3:05 pm)	Carlton 12.9 (81)	def.	Greater Western Sydney 5.5 (35)	Ikon Park (crowd: 1,336)	Report; Stats
Sunday, 26 October (3:05 pm)	Gold Coast 3.6 (24)	def. by	Collingwood 5.9 (39)	Bond University (crowd: 921)	Report; Stats
Two matches were delayed due to nearby lightning under the AFL's lightning protocols: play was halted during the third quarter of the Carlton v Greater Western Sydney match, while the three-quarter time break of the Gold Coast v Collingwood match was extended by 20 minutes.

=== Round 12 ===
	Round 12
Friday, 31 October (7:15 pm)	Hawthorn 2.6 (18)	def. by	North Melbourne 10.7 (67)	Kinetic Stadium (crowd: 2,508)	Report; Stats
Friday, 31 October (6:15 pm)	West Coast 3.4 (22)	def. by	Carlton 6.6 (42)	Sullivan Logistics Stadium (crowd: 2,365)	Report; Stats
Saturday, 1 November (1:05 pm)	Greater Western Sydney 3.6 (24)	def. by	Port Adelaide 11.15 (81)	Henson Park (crowd: 1,172)	Report; Stats
Saturday, 1 November (3:05 pm)	Richmond 3.7 (25)	def. by	Gold Coast 5.9 (39)	Ikon Park (crowd: 1,318)	Report; Stats
Saturday, 1 November (5:40 pm)	Sydney 1.5 (11)	def. by	Essendon 2.2 (14)	C.ex Coffs International Stadium (crowd: 1,563)	Report; Stats
Saturday, 1 November (7:15 pm)	Geelong 6.9 (45)	def. by	Melbourne 9.5 (59)	GMHBA Stadium (crowd: 2,214)	Report; Stats
Sunday, 2 November (1:05 pm)	Collingwood 5.2 (32)	def. by	Brisbane 6.16 (52)	Victoria Park (crowd: 2,032)	Report; Stats
Sunday, 2 November (3:05 pm)	St Kilda 4.3 (27)	def. by	Western Bulldogs 10.12 (72)	RSEA Park (crowd: 2,863)	Report; Stats
Sunday, 2 November (4:35 pm)	Adelaide 4.5 (29)	def.	Fremantle 2.5 (17)	Norwood Oval (crowd: 1,225)	Report; Stats
Gemma Houghton (Port Adelaide) kicked her 100th AFLW goal after the final siren of the match against Greater Western Sydney, becoming the first AFLW player to kick 100 career goals.; The start of the Sydney v Essendon match was delayed by 35 minutes due to nearby lightning under the AFL's lightning protocols.; Ebony Marinoff (Adelaide) recorded her 1,000th career tackle during the match against Fremantle, becoming the first AFLW player to do so.

== Ladder ==
Pos	Team	Pld	W	L	D	PF	PA	PP	Pts	Qualification
1	North Melbourne (P)	12	12	0	0	868	270	321.5	48	Finals series
2	Melbourne	12	9	3	0	684	327	209.2	36	Finals series
3	Brisbane	12	9	3	0	652	403	161.8	36	Finals series
4	Hawthorn	12	9	3	0	451	433	104.2	36	Finals series
5	Carlton	12	8	4	0	554	474	116.9	32	Finals series
6	Adelaide	12	7	5	0	515	460	112.0	28	Finals series
7	St Kilda	12	7	5	0	392	407	96.3	28	Finals series
8	West Coast	12	6	6	0	472	423	111.6	24	Finals series
9	Sydney	12	6	6	0	542	504	107.5	24	
10	Port Adelaide	12	6	6	0	631	601	105.0	24	
11	Fremantle	12	6	6	0	414	512	80.9	24	
12	Western Bulldogs	12	5	7	0	415	358	115.9	20	
13	Geelong	12	5	7	0	500	539	92.8	20	
14	Essendon	12	4	8	0	331	552	60.0	16	
15	Collingwood	12	3	9	0	314	505	62.2	12	
16	Richmond	12	2	10	0	349	583	59.9	8	
17	Greater Western Sydney	12	2	10	0	401	681	58.9	8	
18	Gold Coast	12	2	10	0	319	772	41.3	8	

Source: afl.com.au
Rules for classification: 1) points; 2) percentage; 3) number of points for
(P) Premiers

== Progression by round ==
4	Finished the round in first place	0	Finished the round in last place
4	Won the minor premiership	0	Finished the season in last place
4	Finished the round inside the top eight		
4_{1}	Subscript indicates the ladder position at the end of the round		

Team	1	2	3	4	5	6	7	8	9	10	11	12
North Melbourne	4_{3}	8_{2}	12_{1}	16_{1}	20_{1}	24_{1}	28_{1}	32_{1}	36_{1}	40_{1}	44_{1}	48_{1}
Melbourne	4_{1}	8_{1}	12_{2}	16_{2}	16_{2}	20_{2}	24_{2}	28_{2}	28_{3}	32_{2}	32_{3}	36_{2}
Brisbane	0_{10}	4_{6}	4_{9}	8_{9}	8_{9}	12_{7}	16_{7}	20_{5}	24_{4}	28_{4}	32_{4}	36_{3}
Hawthorn	4_{9}	8_{5}	12_{5}	16_{4}	16_{5}	20_{3}	24_{3}	28_{3}	32_{2}	32_{3}	36_{2}	36_{4}
Carlton	4_{5}	4_{7}	8_{7}	12_{5}	16_{3}	16_{6}	20_{5}	24_{4}	24_{6}	24_{8}	28_{5}	32_{5}
Adelaide	0_{15}	4_{8}	8_{6}	8_{8}	12_{6}	16_{4}	20_{4}	20_{7}	24_{5}	24_{7}	24_{8}	28_{6}
St Kilda	4_{4}	4_{13}	4_{13}	4_{14}	8_{12}	12_{10}	16_{9}	20_{8}	24_{7}	28_{5}	28_{6}	28_{7}
West Coast	4_{7}	4_{9}	8_{8}	12_{6}	12_{7}	12_{9}	16_{8}	20_{6}	20_{8}	24_{6}	24_{7}	24_{8}
Sydney	4_{8}	8_{3}	12_{3}	16_{3}	16_{4}	16_{5}	16_{6}	16_{9}	20_{9}	20_{9}	24_{9}	24_{9}
Port Adelaide	0_{13}	0_{18}	4_{10}	4_{10}	8_{11}	8_{13}	8_{14}	12_{11}	12_{13}	16_{12}	20_{11}	24_{10}
Fremantle	4_{6}	4_{12}	4_{14}	4_{16}	8_{14}	12_{12}	12_{12}	12_{13}	16_{11}	20_{10}	24_{10}	24_{11}
Western Bulldogs	0_{18}	4_{11}	4_{12}	4_{12}	4_{15}	4_{16}	8_{13}	8_{14}	12_{12}	16_{11}	16_{13}	20_{12}
Geelong	0_{16}	0_{16}	0_{16}	4_{11}	8_{10}	12_{8}	12_{10}	12_{10}	16_{10}	16_{13}	20_{12}	20_{13}
Essendon	4_{2}	8_{4}	12_{4}	12_{7}	12_{8}	12_{11}	12_{11}	12_{12}	12_{14}	12_{14}	12_{15}	16_{14}
Collingwood	0_{14}	4_{10}	4_{11}	4_{13}	8_{13}	8_{14}	8_{16}	8_{16}	8_{16}	8_{17}	12_{14}	12_{15}
Richmond	0_{11}	0_{14}	0_{15}	0_{17}	0_{18}	0_{18}	0_{18}	4_{17}	4_{17}	8_{16}	8_{17}	8_{16}
Greater Western Sydney	0_{17}	0_{15}	0_{17}	0_{18}	4_{16}	8_{15}	8_{15}	8_{15}	8_{15}	8_{15}	8_{16}	8_{17}
Gold Coast	0_{12}	0_{17}	0_{18}	4_{15}	4_{17}	4_{17}	4_{17}	4_{18}	4_{18}	4_{18}	4_{18}	8_{18}

Source: Australian Football

== Home match attendance ==
The following table includes all home match attendance figures from the home-and-away season.

Team	Hosted	Total	Highest	Lowest	Average		
Team	Hosted	Total	Highest	Lowest	2024	2025	Change
Adelaide	6	16,831	5,434	1,225	2,862	2,805	▼57
Brisbane	6	21,774	5,022	2,685	3,439	3,629	▲190
Carlton	6	18,865	8,042	1,336	1,974	3,144	▲1,170
Collingwood	6	15,177	4,057	1,542	2,196	2,530	▲334
Essendon	6	15,271	3,184	1,801	3,226	2,545	▼681
Fremantle	6	13,436	2,708	1,580	2,226	2,239	▲13
Geelong	6	15,654	3,146	2,114	2,733	2,609	▼124
Gold Coast	6	7,685	1,917	839	1,634	1,281	▼353
Greater Western Sydney	6	9,745	2,258	1,105	1,369	1,624	▲255
Hawthorn	6	12,978	2,508	1,643	2,430	2,163	▼267
Melbourne	6	12,224	2,681	1,557	1,740	2,037	▲297
North Melbourne	6	12,484	3,282	915	1,821	2,081	▲260
Port Adelaide	6	15,509	3,039	2,162	3,013	2,584	▼429
Richmond	6	14,951	5,892	1,309	1,772	2,492	▲720
St Kilda	6	12,605	2,898	1,428	1,724	2,101	▲377
Sydney	6	26,986	7,171	1,563	3,613	4,498	▼885
West Coast	6	11,516	2,428	1,453	2,757	1,919	▼838
Western Bulldogs	6	14,402	4,234	1,521	6,683	2,400	▼4,283
Total/overall	108	268,093	8,042	839	2,658	2,482	▼176

Source: Australian Football

== Finals series ==
Qualifying and elimination finals
7 November, Ikon Park
1	North Melbourne	5.12 (42)
4	Hawthorn	0.3 (3)
8 November, Ikon Park
5	Carlton	9.6 (60)
8	West Coast	2.7 (19)
9 November, Norwood Oval
6	Adelaide	8.12 (60)
7	St Kilda	2.4 (16)
9 November, Ikon Park
2	Melbourne	6.7 (43)
3	Brisbane	9.2 (56)

Semi-finals
15 November, Ikon Park
Hawthorn	4.9 (33)
Carlton	11.13 (79)
15 November, Ikon Park
Melbourne	9.6 (60)
Adelaide	7.7 (49)

Preliminary finals
22 November, Ikon Park
North Melbourne	6.10 (46)
Melbourne	5.6 (36)
22 November, Brighton Homes Arena
Brisbane	10.7 (67)
Carlton	5.2 (32)

Grand final
29 November, Ikon Park
North Melbourne	9.2 (56)
Brisbane	2.4 (16)

All starting times are local time. Source: afl.com.au

=== Finals week 1 ===
First qualifying final
Friday, 7 November (7:15 pm)	North Melbourne 5.12 (42)	def.	Hawthorn 0.3 (3)	Ikon Park (crowd: 4,392)	Report; Stats
1.4 (10); 2.7 (19); 2.8 (20); 5.12 (42)	Q1; Q2; Q3; Q4	0.0 (0); 0.1 (1); 0.2 (2); 0.3 (3)
Bogue, Eddey, O'Loughlin, Randall, Rennie	Goals	Nil
Garner, Riddell, O'Shea, Craven, Bruton	Best	West, Richardson, Everist, Lucas-Rodd
Hawthorn's score of 0.3 (3) against North Melbourne was the lowest in an AFLW final.

First elimination final
Saturday, 8 November (3:05 pm)	Carlton 9.6 (60)	def.	West Coast 2.7 (19)	Ikon Park (crowd: 3,420)	Report; Stats
2.3 (15); 2.4 (16); 8.6 (54); 9.6 (60)	Q1; Q2; Q3; Q4	0.0 (0); 1.2 (8); 1.3 (9); 2.7 (19)
Finn 2, Fitzpatrick 2, S. McKay 2, Austin, Bohanna, Scholz	Goals	Painter, Roberts
Fitzpatrick, S. McKay, Harrington, Guerin, Finn	Best	Roberts, Britton, Thomas, Painter, Swanson

Second qualifying final
Sunday, 9 November (1:05 pm)	Melbourne 6.7 (43)	def. by	Brisbane 9.2 (56)	Ikon Park (crowd: 3,711)	Report; Stats
2.3 (15); 2.4 (16); 3.6 (24); 6.7 (43)	Q1; Q2; Q3; Q4	0.1 (1); 3.1 (19); 6.2 (38); 9.2 (56)
Bannan, Gall, Harris, Hore, Mahony, Wotherspoon	Goals	Anderson 2, Hampson 2, Davidson, Dooley, Hodder, Mullins, Postlethwaite
Hore, B. Mackin, Gillard, McNamara, Paxman	Best	Anderson, Koenen, Davidson, Hampson, Campbell, Mullins

Second elimination final
Sunday, 9 November (2:35 pm)	Adelaide 8.12 (60)	def.	St Kilda 2.4 (16)	Norwood Oval (crowd: 3,228)	Report; Stats
1.3 (9); 4.5 (29); 6.6 (42); 8.12 (60)	Q1; Q2; Q3; Q4	0.0 (0); 0.1 (1); 2.4 (16); 2.4 (16)
Gould 2, Rasheed 2, Charlton, Hatchard, Jones, Prowse	Goals	Patrikios, Wardlaw
Marinoff, N. Kelly, Hatchard, Goodwin, Rasheed, Newman	Best	Patrikios, Smith, Lambert, Watson, Gee, Stevens

=== Finals week 2 ===
Second semi-final
Saturday, 15 November (1:05 pm)	Melbourne 9.6 (60)	def.	Adelaide 7.7 (49)	Ikon Park (crowd: 2,624)	Report; Stats
3.2 (20); 4.3 (27); 6.5 (41); 9.6 (60)	Q1; Q2; Q3; Q4	1.2 (8); 6.4 (40); 6.5 (41); 7.7 (49)
Hore 3, Mahony 2, Campbell, Fitzsimon, B. Mackin, Wotherspoon	Goals	J. Allan, Charlton, Gould, N. Kelly, Marinoff, Ponter, Prowse
Hore, Hanks, Mahony, Gillard, Heath, Harris	Best	Marinoff, Biddell, N. Kelly, Newman, Hatchard

First semi-final
Saturday, 15 November (7:15 pm)	Hawthorn 4.9 (33)	def. by	Carlton 11.13 (79)	Ikon Park (crowd: 5,645)	Report; Stats
0.0 (0); 2.4 (16); 2.6 (18); 4.9 (33)	Q1; Q2; Q3; Q4	4.7 (31); 6.7 (43); 10.10 (70); 11.13 (79)
Fleming, Flockart, McDonagh, Stone	Goals	S. McKay 3, Austin 2, Finn 2, Goss, Hill, A. McKay, Scholz
Lucas-Rodd, Fleming, West, Elliott	Best	Hill, Scholz, A. McKay, Cordner, S. McKay, Goss

=== Finals week 3 ===
First preliminary final
Saturday, 22 November (3:05 pm)	North Melbourne 6.10 (46)	def.	Melbourne 5.6 (36)	Ikon Park (crowd: 7,057)	Report; Stats
3.1 (19); 4.6 (30); 4.6 (30); 6.10 (46)	Q1; Q2; Q3; Q4	4.2 (26); 5.2 (32); 5.6 (36); 5.6 (36)
Bogue 3, Garner, Riddell, Sheerin	Goals	Hore 2, Harris, Paxman, Wotherspoon
Garner, Kearney, O'Shea, Riddell, Smith	Best	Gillard, Chaplin, Hore, Hanks, Goldrick

Second preliminary final
Saturday, 22 November (6:35 pm)	Brisbane 10.7 (67)	def.	Carlton 5.2 (32)	Brighton Homes Arena (crowd: 6,511)	Report; Stats
0.3 (3); 3.5 (23); 9.6 (60); 10.7 (67)	Q1; Q2; Q3; Q4	1.0 (6); 3.0 (18); 4.0 (24); 5.2 (32)
R. Svarc 4, Davidson 2, Hampson 2, Hodder, Smith	Goals	Finn 2, Scholz 2, S. McKay
R. Svarc, Hodder, Ellenger, Dawes, Hickie, Hampson	Best	Cordner, Finn, Guerin, Hill

=== Grand final ===
Grand final
Saturday, 29 November (7:45 pm)	North Melbourne 9.2 (56)	def.	Brisbane 2.4 (16)	Ikon Park (crowd: 12,741)	Report; Stats
2.0 (12); 5.0 (30); 6.0 (36); 9.2 (56)	Q1; Q2; Q3; Q4	1.1 (7); 1.2 (8); 2.2 (14); 2.4 (16)	Best on ground: Eilish Sheerin (North Melbourne); Field umpires: Joshua Ball, Sam Nippress, Gabby Simmonds; National anthem: Bonnie Anderson
Bruton 3, Sheerin 2, Eddey, Garner, Randall, Shierlaw	Goals	Mullins, R. Svarc
Sheerin, Riddell, Garner, Bruton, A. Smith	Best	Dawes, Conway, Anderson, Dunne
Ash Riddell (North Melbourne) recorded 39 disposals in the grand final against Brisbane, an AFLW grand final record.; Libby Birch (North Melbourne) became the first player to win four AFLW premierships.

== Win–loss table ==
The following table can be sorted from biggest winning margin to biggest losing margin for each round. If two or more matches in a round are decided by the same margin, these margins are sorted by percentage (i.e. the lowest-scoring winning team is ranked highest and the lowest-scoring losing team is ranked lowest). Home matches are in bold, and opponents are listed above the margins.

+	Win	Qualified for finals
−	Loss	Eliminated
X	Bye	

Team	Home-and-away season												Ladder	Finals series			
Team	1	2	3	4	5	6	7	8	9	10	11	12	Ladder	F1	F2	F3	GF
Adelaide	STK −22	**GEE** **+38**	GWS +32	**BRI** **−3**	HAW +21	GC +16	**SYD** **+2**	RIC –11	**WC** **+17**	NM −40	**PA** **–7**	**FRE** **+12**	6 (7–5–0)	**STK** **+44**	MEL –11		
Brisbane	**HAW** **−4**	FRE +70	**CAR** **−14**	ADE +3	**NM** **−29**	WB +25	**RIC** **+34**	GC +68	**PA** **+29**	ESS +38	**MEL** **+9**	COL +20	3 (9–3–0)	MEL +13	X	**CAR** **+35**	NM −40
Carlton	**COL** **+24**	HAW −8	BRI +14	**WB** **+16**	**GC** **+46**	NM −53	**FRE** **+9**	GEE +18	SYD –39	**STK** **–13**	**GWS** **+46**	WC +20	5 (8–4–0)	**WC** **+41**	HAW +46	BRI −35	
Collingwood	CAR −24	**GWS** **+8**	**MEL** **−4**	NM −45	**SYD** **+26**	**HAW** **−9**	WB −57	WC −45	STK –23	**RIC** **–13**	GC +15	**BRI** **−20**	15 (3–9–0)				
Essendon	GWS +56	**WC** **+5**	RIC +15	**GEE** **−31**	**STK** **−52**	FRE −48	**NM** **−30**	MEL –14	WB –57	**BRI** **−38**	**HAW** **−30**	SYD +3	14 (4–8–0)				
Fremantle	PA +22	**BRI** **−70**	**NM** **−100**	SYD −25	**WC** **+7**	**ESS** **+48**	CAR −9	HAW –15	**MEL** **+5**	GWS +7	**RIC** **+44**	ADE −12	11 (6–6–0)				
Geelong	**NM** **−30**	ADE −38	**SYD** **−5**	ESS +31	RIC +30	PA +5	**HAW** **−7**	**CAR** **–18**	**GWS** **+27**	WC –31	WB +11	**MEL** **−14**	13 (5–7–0)				
Gold Coast	WC −15	**SYD** **−82**	PA −68	**GWS** **+19**	CAR −46	**ADE** **−16**	MEL −87	**BRI** **–68**	HAW –23	**WB** **–66**	**COL** **–15**	RIC +14	18 (2–10–0)				
Greater Western Sydney	**ESS** **−56**	COL −8	**ADE** **−32**	GC −19	**WB** **+21**	SYD +7	WC −42	**STK** **−14**	GEE –27	**FRE** **–7**	CAR −46	**PA** **–57**	17 (2–10–0)				
Hawthorn	BRI +4	**CAR** **+8**	WB +4	**STK** **+23**	**ADE** **−21**	COL +9	GEE +7	**FRE** **+15**	**GC** **+23**	PA –35	ESS +30	**NM** **–49**	4 (9–3–0)	NM –39	**CAR** **–46**		
Melbourne	WB +48	**STK** **+74**	COL +4	**RIC** **+37**	PA −2	**WC** **+51**	**GC** **+87**	**ESS** **+14**	FRE –5	**SYD** **+44**	BRI –9	GEE +14	2 (9–3–0)	**BRI** **–13**	**ADE** **+11**	NM −10	
North Melbourne	GEE +30	**PA** **+72**	FRE +100	**COL** **+45**	BRI +29	**CAR** **+53**	ESS +30	**SYD** **+68**	RIC +36	**ADE** **+40**	**STK** **+46**	HAW +49	1 (12–0–0)	**HAW** **+39**	X	**MEL** **+10**	**BRI** **+40**
Port Adelaide	**FRE** **−22**	NM −72	**GC** **+68**	WC −19	**MEL** **+2**	**GEE** **−5**	STK −11	**WB** **+19**	BRI −29	**HAW** **+35**	ADE +7	GWS +57	10 (6–6–0)				
Richmond	SYD −20	**WB** **−21**	**ESS** **−15**	MEL −37	**GEE** **−30**	STK −7	BRI −34	**ADE** **+11**	**NM** **–36**	COL +13	FRE −44	**GC** **−14**	16 (2–10–0)				
St Kilda	**ADE** **+22**	MEL −74	**WC** **−14**	HAW −23	ESS +52	**RIC** **+7**	**PA** **+11**	GWS +14	**COL** **+23**	CAR +13	NM −46	**WB** **−45**	7 (7–5–0)	ADE −44			
Sydney	**RIC** **+20**	GC +82	GEE +5	**FRE** **+25**	COL −26	**GWS** **−7**	ADE −2	NM –68	**CAR** **+39**	MEL –44	**WC** **+17**	**ESS** **−3**	9 (6–6–0)				
West Coast	**GC** **+15**	ESS −5	STK +14	**PA** **+19**	FRE −7	MEL −51	**GWS** **+42**	**COL** **+45**	ADE −17	**GEE** **+31**	SYD −17	**CAR** **−20**	8 (6–6–0)	CAR −41			
Western Bulldogs	**MEL** **−48**	RIC +21	**HAW** **−4**	CAR −16	GWS −21	**BRI** **−25**	**COL** **+57**	PA –19	**ESS** **+57**	GC +66	**GEE** **–11**	STK +45	12 (5–7–0)				

Source: Australian Football

== Season notes ==
- St Kilda and West Coast qualified for finals for the first time.
- North Melbourne completed a perfect season, winning all 15 matches across the home-and-away season and finals series, and became the first club in the competition's history to win consecutive premierships.

== Coach departures ==
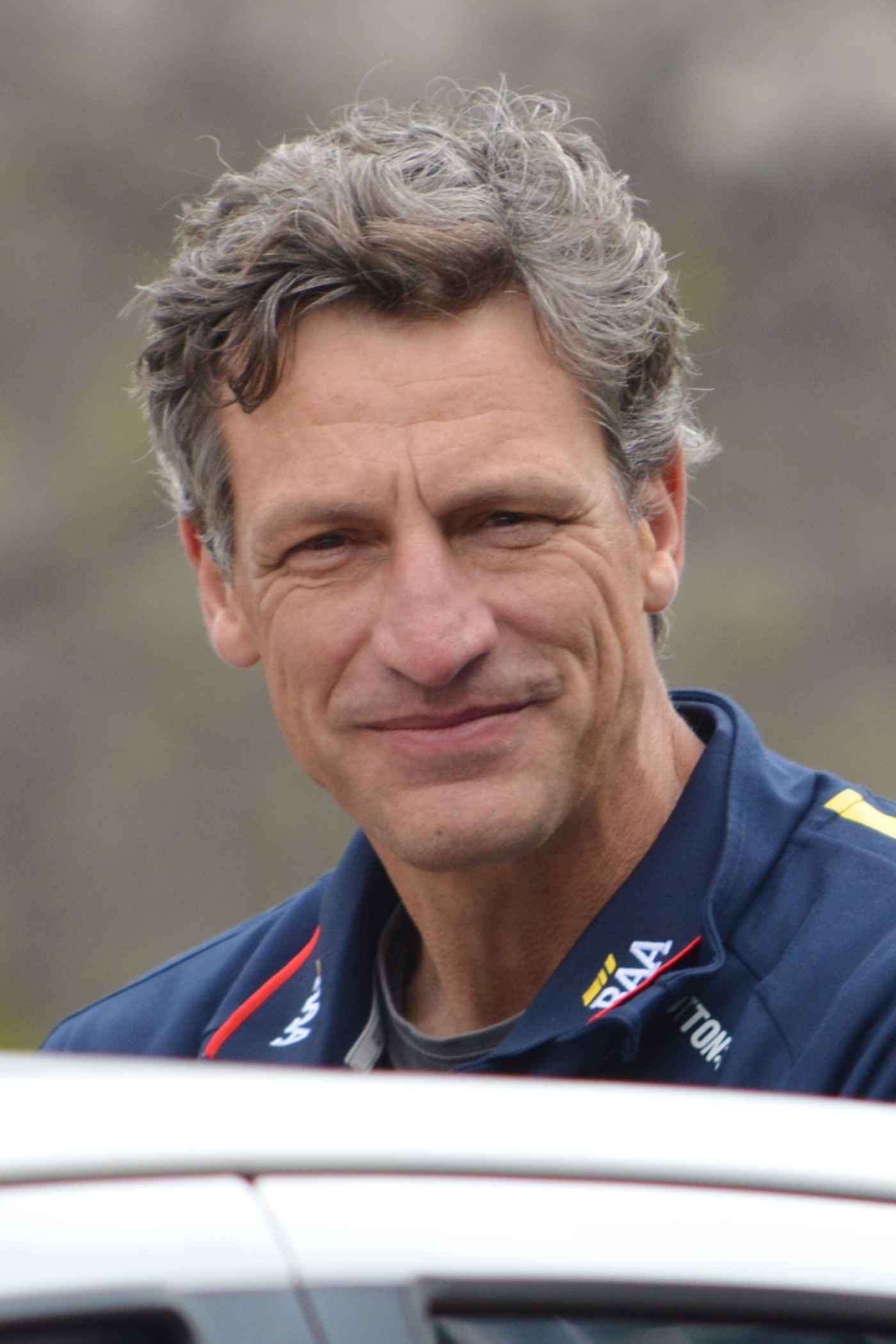
Dual Adelaide premiership coach Matthew Clarke announced leading into the season that 2025 would be his final season as Adelaide coach.

Outgoing coach	Club	Manner of departure	Date of departure	Caretaker coach	Incoming coach	Date of appointment
Matthew Clarke	Adelaide	Stepped down at end of season	3 April 2025 (Note: Announcement of final season)	—	Ryan Davis	2 December 2025
Scott Gowans	Sydney	Dismissed with two years remaining on contract	6 November 2025	—	Colin O'Riordan	17 December 2025
Dan Lowther	Geelong	Stepped down at end of season	21 November 2025	—	Mick Stinear	10 December 2025
Mick Stinear	Melbourne	Stepped down at end of season	24 November 2025	—	Tom Wilson	7 April 2026
Ryan Ferguson	Richmond	Parted ways following club review	4 December 2025	—	Jarrad Donders	24 February 2026
Lauren Arnell	Port Adelaide	Stepped down during off-season	27 January 2026	—	Glenn Strachan	11 March 2026

== Awards ==
=== Major awards ===
- The AFL Women's best and fairest was awarded to North Melbourne midfielder Ash Riddell.
- The AFLPA AFLW most valuable player was awarded to North Melbourne's Jasmine Garner; the best captain award was also won by Garner, the most courageous player award was won by Kiara Bowers of Fremantle and best first-year player was won by Zippy Fish of Sydney.
- The AFLCA AFLW champion player of the year was awarded to North Melbourne's Ash Riddell.
- The AFL Women's All-Australian team was announced on 24 November; North Melbourne's Jasmine Garner was named captain and Melbourne forward Kate Hore was named vice-captain. Garner's selection was the eighth of her career, tying the league record with teammate Emma Kearney.
- The AFL Women's leading goalkicker was awarded to Port Adelaide's Indy Tahau, who scored 25 goals in the home-and-away season.
- The AFL Women's Rising Star was awarded to Sydney's Zippy Fish.
- The Goal of the Year was awarded to Sydney's Montana Ham.
- The Mark of the Year was awarded to Richmond's Sarah Hosking.

=== Leading goalkickers ===
1	Led the goalkicking at the end of the round
1	Led the goalkicking at the end of the home-and-away season
1_{1}	Subscript indicates the player's goal tally to that point of the season
–	Did not play during that round
X	Had a bye during that round

#	Player	Team	Home-and-away season (AFL Women's leading goalkicker)												Finals series				Total	Games	Average
#	Player	Team	1	2	3	4	5	6	7	8	9	10	11	12	F1	F2	F3	GF	Total	Games	Average
1	Blaithin Bogue	North Melbourne	2_{2}	1_{3}	4_{7}	1_{8}	3_{11}	1_{12}	2_{14}	1_{15}	2_{17}	1_{18}	2_{20}	1_{21}	1_{22}	X_{22}	3_{25}	0_{25}	25	15	1.67
1	Indy Tahau	Port Adelaide	0_{0}	0_{0}	3_{3}	2_{5}	3_{8}	2_{10}	1_{11}	4_{15}	1_{16}	5_{21}	2_{23}	2_{25}					25	12	2.08
3	Kate Hore	Melbourne	2_{2}	1_{3}	2_{5}	2_{7}	3_{10}	2_{12}	2_{14}	0_{14}	1_{15}	1_{16}	1_{17}	1_{18}	1_{19}	3_{22}	2_{24}		24	15	1.60
3	Tahlia Randall	North Melbourne	0_{0}	1_{1}	3_{4}	2_{6}	2_{8}	2_{10}	1_{11}	3_{14}	2_{16}	1_{17}	1_{18}	4_{22}	1_{23}	X_{23}	0_{23}	1_{24}	24	15	1.60
5	Gemma Houghton	Port Adelaide	0_{0}	2_{2}	4_{6}	1_{7}	1_{8}	1_{9}	2_{11}	1_{12}	2_{14}	3_{17}	2_{19}	4_{23}					23	12	1.92
6	Áine McDonagh	Hawthorn	2_{2}	1_{3}	0_{3}	2_{5}	1_{6}	2_{8}	2_{10}	1_{11}	3_{14}	3_{17}	3_{20}	1_{21}	0_{21}	1_{22}			22	14	1.57
6	Eden Zanker	Melbourne	2_{2}	2_{4}	1_{5}	1_{6}	0_{6}	5_{11}	0_{11}	0_{11}	1_{12}	4_{16}	2_{18}	4_{22}	0_{22}	–_{22}	0_{22}		22	14	1.57
8	Jasmine Garner	North Melbourne	1_{1}	6_{7}	1_{8}	–_{8}	1_{9}	2_{11}	1_{12}	4_{16}	2_{18}	1_{19}	0_{19}	0_{19}	0_{19}	X_{19}	1_{20}	1_{20}	21	14	1.50
9	Chloe Molloy	Sydney	4_{4}	7_{11}	1_{12}	2_{14}	1_{15}	0_{15}	2_{17}	0_{17}	2_{19}	–_{19}	–_{19}	–_{19}					19	9	2.11
10	Sophie McKay	Carlton	0_{0}	0_{0}	1_{1}	2_{3}	3_{6}	1_{7}	1_{8}	0_{8}	0_{8}	2_{10}	2_{12}	0_{12}	2_{14}	3_{17}	1_{18}		18	15	1.20
10	Taylor Smith	Brisbane	1_{1}	2_{3}	1_{4}	2_{6}	0_{6}	2_{8}	1_{9}	3_{12}	1_{13}	1_{14}	1_{15}	2_{17}	0_{17}	X_{17}	1_{18}	0_{18}	18	15	1.20

Source: Australian Football

=== Club best and fairest ===
Dayna Finn (Carlton), Aisling McCarthy (Fremantle) and Áine McDonagh (Hawthorn) became the first Irish players to win club best and fairest awards at AFLW level.

Player	Club	Award	Ref.
Ebony Marinoff	Adelaide	Club Champion	
Belle Dawes	Brisbane	Best and fairest	
Dayna Finn	Carlton	Best and fairest	
Brittany Bonnici	Collingwood	Best and fairest	
Georgia Nanscawen	Essendon	Best and fairest	
Aisling McCarthy	Fremantle	Fairest and best	
Georgie Prespakis	Geelong	Best and fairest	
Charlie Rowbottom	Gold Coast	Club Champion	
Zarlie Goldsworthy	Greater Western Sydney	Gabrielle Trainor Medal	
Áine McDonagh	Hawthorn	Best and fairest	
Kate Hore	Melbourne	Daisy Pearce Trophy	
Ash Riddell	North Melbourne	Club Champion	
Matilda Scholz	Port Adelaide	Best and fairest	
Monique Conti	Richmond	Best and fairest	
Tyanna Smith	St Kilda	Best and fairest	
Laura Gardiner	Sydney	Club Champion	
Ella Roberts	West Coast	Club Champion	
Ellie Blackburn	Western Bulldogs	Best and fairest	

== See also ==
- 2025 AFL season

== Sources ==
- 2025 AFL Women's season at afl.com.au
- 2025 AFL Women's season at Australian Football
- 2025 AFL Women's season at Austadiums
