= 2025–26 AFL Women's player movement period =

Tenth player movement period of the AFL Women's (AFLW) competition

The 2025–26 AFL Women's player movement period consisted of the various periods when the 18 clubs in the AFL Women's (AFLW) competition can recruit players following the 2025 AFL Women's season.

== Retirements and delistings ==
Name	Club	Date	Status	Ref.
Jess Hosking	West Coast	19 September 2025	Retired	
Jodie Hicks	Richmond	22 October 2025	Retired	
Rebecca Clottey	Hawthorn	24 October 2025	Delisted	
Maddy Collier	Sydney	27 October 2025	Retired	
Aliesha Newman	Greater Western Sydney	28 October 2025	Retired	
Meg McDonald	Geelong	29 October 2025	Retired	
Dana Hooker	West Coast	29 October 2025	Retired	
Kate Darby	Geelong	30 October 2025	Retired	
Shelley Scott	Geelong	30 October 2025	Retired	
Philipa Seth	Fremantle	2 November 2025	Retired	
Janelle Cuthbertson	Port Adelaide	3 November 2025	Retired	
Rebecca Privitelli	Sydney	5 November 2025	Retired	
Giselle Davies	Sydney	5 November 2025	Delisted	
Kiara Hillier	Sydney	5 November 2025	Delisted	
Alissa Brook	Port Adelaide	5 November 2025	Delisted	
Coby Morgan	Port Adelaide	5 November 2025	Delisted	
Jasmin Stewart	Port Adelaide	5 November 2025	Delisted	
Tessa Lavey	Richmond	5 November 2025	Retired	
Keely Fullerton	Gold Coast	6 November 2025	Delisted	
Tayla Gregory	Gold Coast	6 November 2025	Delisted	
Ella Maurer	Gold Coast	6 November 2025	Delisted	
Taya Oliver	Gold Coast	6 November 2025	Delisted	
Wallis Randell	Gold Coast	6 November 2025	Delisted	
Ella Smith	Gold Coast	6 November 2025	Delisted	
Brooke Sheridan	Essendon	6 November 2025	Delisted	
Mia Van Dyke	Essendon	6 November 2025	Delisted	
Joanne Cregg	Fremantle	7 November 2025	Retired	
Amy Mulholland	Fremantle	7 November 2025	Retired	
Gabby Biedenweg-Webster	Fremantle	7 November 2025	Delisted	
Erica Fowler	Geelong	7 November 2025	Retired	
Anna-Rose Kennedy	Geelong	7 November 2025	Retired	
Melissa Bragg	Geelong	7 November 2025	Delisted	
Gabbi Featherston	Geelong	7 November 2025	Delisted	
Bella Smith	Geelong	7 November 2025	Delisted	
Lulu Beatty	Richmond	7 November 2025	Delisted	
Lauren Brazzale	Richmond	7 November 2025	Delisted	
Charley Ryan	Richmond	7 November 2025	Delisted	
Meghan Gaffney	Greater Western Sydney	10 November 2025	Delisted	
Vivien Saad	Greater Western Sydney	10 November 2025	Delisted	
Muireann Atkinson	Collingwood	12 November 2025	Delisted	
Mikayla Hyde	Collingwood	12 November 2025	Delisted	
Selena Karlson	Collingwood	12 November 2025	Delisted	
Nell Morris-Dalton	Collingwood	12 November 2025	Delisted	
Charlotte Taylor	Collingwood	12 November 2025	Delisted	
Rebecca Ott	St Kilda	14 November 2025	Delisted	
Natalie Plane	St Kilda	14 November 2025	Delisted	
Charlotte Simpson	St Kilda	14 November 2025	Delisted	
Hannah Stuart	St Kilda	14 November 2025	Delisted	
Grace Brooker	Essendon	19 November 2025	Retired	
Zimmorlei Farquharson	Western Bulldogs	20 November 2025	Delisted	
Naomi Ferres	Western Bulldogs	20 November 2025	Delisted	
Nat Exon	Hawthorn	21 November 2025	Delisted	
Kristy Stratton	Hawthorn	21 November 2025	Delisted	
Tarni Brown	Carlton	27 November 2025	Retired	
Eliza Wood	Carlton	27 November 2025	Delisted	
Charlotte Brewer	Carlton	27 November 2025	Delisted	
Ebony Antonio	Fremantle	27 November 2025	Retired	
Denby Taylor	Melbourne	28 November 2025	Delisted	
Gabrielle Colvin	Melbourne	28 November 2025	Retired	
Caitlin Thorne	Geelong	2 December 2025	Delisted	
Abbie Ballard	Adelaide	3 December 2025	Delisted	
Rachelle Martin	Adelaide	3 December 2025	Delisted	
Annabel Johnson	West Coast	3 December 2025	Delisted	
Courtney Lindgren	West Coast	3 December 2025	Delisted	
Kerryn Peterson	Carlton	5 December 2025	Delisted	
Stevie-Lee Thompson	Adelaide	5 December 2025	Retired	
Haneen Zreika	Greater Western Sydney	8 December 2025	Delisted	
Jacinta Baldwick	Brisbane	8 December 2025	Delisted	
Dee Heslop	Brisbane	8 December 2025	Delisted	
Indiana Williams	Brisbane	8 December 2025	Delisted	
Kiara Bischa	Gold Coast	8 December 2025	Delisted	
Ruby Sargent-Wilson	Sydney	9 December 2025	Delisted	
Katelyn Cox	Richmond	10 December 2025	Delisted	
Shelby Knoll	Richmond	10 December 2025	Delisted	
Grace Campbell	Collingwood	10 December 2025	Delisted	
Georgia Clark	Collingwood	10 December 2025	Delisted	
Annie Lee	Collingwood	10 December 2025	Delisted	
Alana Porter	Collingwood	10 December 2025	Delisted	
Kayley Kavanagh	West Coast	10 December 2025	Delisted	
Kristie-Lee Weston-Turner	Western Bulldogs	10 December 2025	Self-delisted	
Ainslie Kemp	Hawthorn	11 December 2025	Delisted	
Ellyse Gamble	Essendon	11 December 2025	Delisted	
Amelie Gladman	Essendon	11 December 2025	Delisted	
Jess Verbrugge	Essendon	11 December 2025	Delisted	
Holly Ifould	Fremantle	11 December 2025	Delisted	
Poppy Stockwell	Fremantle	11 December 2025	Delisted	
Sophie Kavanagh	Greater Western Sydney	12 December 2025	Delisted	
Indi Linde	Greater Western Sydney	12 December 2025	Delisted	
Arianna Clarke	St Kilda	12 December 2025	Delisted	
Lilu Hung	St Kilda	12 December 2025	Delisted	
Maria Cannon	Carlton	12 December 2025	Delisted	
Jemma Rigoni	Melbourne	12 December 2025	Self-delisted	
Sarah Wright	North Melbourne	18 December 2025	Retired	
Chelsea Randall	Adelaide	29 June 2026	Retired	

== Trade period ==
=== Trades ===
The trade period took place from 4 to 10 December 2025. This marked the first trade period in which future picks could be traded.

Pick #→	Draft pick was later on-traded to another club

Date	Clubs involved	Club	Received	Ref.
4 December	Adelaide / Greater Western Sydney	Adelaide	Pick 21→	
4 December	Adelaide / Greater Western Sydney	Adelaide	Pick 39	
4 December	Adelaide / Greater Western Sydney	Greater Western Sydney	2026 Adelaide first-round pick	
4 December	Essendon / St Kilda	Essendon	Pick 13→	
4 December	Essendon / St Kilda	Essendon	Pick 49	
4 December	Essendon / St Kilda	St Kilda	Pick 24	
4 December	Essendon / St Kilda	St Kilda	Pick 42	
4 December	Essendon / St Kilda	St Kilda	2026 Essendon second-round pick	
5 December	North Melbourne / Richmond	North Melbourne	2026 Richmond fourth-round pick→	
5 December	North Melbourne / Richmond	Richmond	Georgia Stubs	
5 December	North Melbourne / Richmond	Richmond	2026 North Melbourne fourth-round pick→	
5 December	Carlton / North Melbourne	Carlton	Pick 19→	
5 December	Carlton / North Melbourne	Carlton	2026 North Melbourne second-round pick→	
5 December	Carlton / North Melbourne	North Melbourne	2026 Carlton first-round pick	
5 December	Carlton / North Melbourne	North Melbourne	2026 Carlton third-round pick	
7 December	Carlton / Gold Coast	Carlton	Lauren Bella	
7 December	Carlton / Gold Coast	Carlton	Claudia Whitfort	
7 December	Carlton / Gold Coast	Gold Coast	Pick 19	
7 December	Carlton / Gold Coast	Gold Coast	2026 North Melbourne second-round pick	
7 December	Gold Coast / Richmond	Gold Coast	Pick 4→	
7 December	Gold Coast / Richmond	Gold Coast	Pick 22	
7 December	Gold Coast / Richmond	Richmond	Pick 1	
7 December	Gold Coast / Richmond	Richmond	Pick 56	
7 December	Gold Coast / Richmond	Richmond	2026 Gold Coast third-round pick→	
7 December	Adelaide / Gold Coast	Adelaide	Pick 4	
7 December	Adelaide / Gold Coast	Adelaide	Pick 38→	
7 December	Adelaide / Gold Coast	Adelaide	2026 Gold Coast first-round pick	
7 December	Adelaide / Gold Coast	Gold Coast	Anne Hatchard	
7 December	Adelaide / Gold Coast	Gold Coast	Pick 14→	
7 December	Adelaide / Gold Coast	Gold Coast	Pick 21	
7 December	Adelaide / Gold Coast	Gold Coast	Pick 32	
8 December	North Melbourne / West Coast	North Melbourne	Pick 48	
8 December	North Melbourne / West Coast	West Coast	Ella Slocombe	
8 December	North Melbourne / West Coast	West Coast	2026 Richmond fourth-round pick	
8 December	Brisbane / Greater Western Sydney	Brisbane	2026 Greater Western Sydney end-of-first-round pick	
8 December	Brisbane / Greater Western Sydney	Greater Western Sydney	Poppy Boltz	
8 December	Brisbane / Greater Western Sydney	Greater Western Sydney	2026 Brisbane second-round pick→	
8 December	Fremantle / Melbourne	Fremantle	Lily Johnson	
8 December	Fremantle / Melbourne	Fremantle	Eden Zanker	
8 December	Fremantle / Melbourne	Fremantle	Pick 35	
8 December	Fremantle / Melbourne	Fremantle	2026 Melbourne fourth-round pick	
8 December	Fremantle / Melbourne	Melbourne	Pick 9	
8 December	Fremantle / Melbourne	Melbourne	Pick 27→	
8 December	Fremantle / Melbourne	Melbourne	Pick 81	
8 December	Fremantle / Melbourne	Melbourne	2026 Fremantle second-round pick→	
8 December	Adelaide / Richmond	Adelaide	Grace Egan	
8 December	Adelaide / Richmond	Richmond	Pick 38	
8 December	Gold Coast / Melbourne	Gold Coast	Pick 17→	
8 December	Gold Coast / Melbourne	Gold Coast	Pick 27	
8 December	Gold Coast / Melbourne	Melbourne	Pick 14	
8 December	Gold Coast / Melbourne	Melbourne	2026 Gold Coast second-round pick	
8 December	Brisbane / Port Adelaide	Brisbane	Pick 28→	
8 December	Brisbane / Port Adelaide	Brisbane	Pick 46→	
8 December	Brisbane / Port Adelaide	Brisbane	2026 Port Adelaide third-round pick→	
8 December	Brisbane / Port Adelaide	Port Adelaide	Ellie Hampson	
8 December	Brisbane / Port Adelaide	Port Adelaide	Pick 36→	
8 December	Brisbane / Port Adelaide	Port Adelaide	2026 Brisbane fourth-round pick→	
9 December	Carlton / West Coast	Carlton	Pick 66	
9 December	Carlton / West Coast	Carlton	2026 West Coast fifth-round pick	
9 December	Carlton / West Coast	West Coast	Keeley Skepper	
9 December	Carlton / West Coast	West Coast	2026 Carlton fourth-round pick	
9 December	Geelong / St Kilda	Geelong	Nicola Stevens	
9 December	Geelong / St Kilda	Geelong	2026 St Kilda third-round pick	
9 December	Geelong / St Kilda	St Kilda	2026 Geelong second-round pick	
10 December	Brisbane / Hawthorn / Sydney	Brisbane	Pick 11 (from Sydney)	
10 December	Brisbane / Hawthorn / Sydney	Brisbane	Pick 15→ (from Hawthorn)	
10 December	Brisbane / Hawthorn / Sydney	Brisbane	Pick 29→ (from Brisbane)	
10 December	Brisbane / Hawthorn / Sydney	Brisbane	Pick 33 (from Hawthorn)	
10 December	Brisbane / Hawthorn / Sydney	Brisbane	Pick 47→ (from Brisbane)	
10 December	Brisbane / Hawthorn / Sydney	Hawthorn	2026 Sydney first-round pick (from Sydney)	
10 December	Brisbane / Hawthorn / Sydney	Hawthorn	2026 Brisbane third-round pick→ (from Brisbane)	
10 December	Brisbane / Hawthorn / Sydney	Hawthorn	2026 Port Adelaide third-round pick→ (from Brisbane)	
10 December	Brisbane / Hawthorn / Sydney	Hawthorn	2026 Sydney third-round pick→ (from Sydney)	
10 December	Brisbane / Hawthorn / Sydney	Sydney	Taylor Smith (from Brisbane)	
10 December	Brisbane / Hawthorn / Sydney	Sydney	Pick 18 (from Brisbane)	
10 December	Brisbane / Hawthorn / Sydney	Sydney	Pick 28 (from Brisbane)	
10 December	Brisbane / Hawthorn / Sydney	Sydney	Pick 46 (from Brisbane)	
10 December	Gold Coast / Hawthorn	Gold Coast	2026 Brisbane third-round pick	
10 December	Gold Coast / Hawthorn	Hawthorn	Jacqui Dupuy	
10 December	Collingwood / North Melbourne	Collingwood	Ariana Hetherington	
10 December	Collingwood / North Melbourne	North Melbourne	2026 Collingwood third-round pick	
10 December	Collingwood / Gold Coast / Western Bulldogs	Collingwood	Pick 17→ (from Gold Coast)	
10 December	Collingwood / Gold Coast / Western Bulldogs	Collingwood	Pick 26 (from Western Bulldogs)	
10 December	Collingwood / Gold Coast / Western Bulldogs	Gold Coast	Pick 23 (from Collingwood)	
10 December	Collingwood / Gold Coast / Western Bulldogs	Gold Coast	2026 Western Bulldogs third-round pick (from Western Bulldogs)	
10 December	Collingwood / Gold Coast / Western Bulldogs	Western Bulldogs	Mikala Cann (from Collingwood)	
10 December	Adelaide / Essendon	Adelaide	Pick 13	
10 December	Adelaide / Essendon	Adelaide	Pick 60	
10 December	Adelaide / Essendon	Adelaide	2026 Essendon third-round pick	
10 December	Adelaide / Essendon	Essendon	Zoe Prowse	
10 December	Adelaide / Essendon	Essendon	Pick 50	
10 December	Adelaide / Essendon	Essendon	2026 Adelaide fourth-round pick	
10 December	Carlton / Melbourne	Carlton	2026 Fremantle second-round pick→	
10 December	Carlton / Melbourne	Carlton	2026 Melbourne third-round pick→	
10 December	Carlton / Melbourne	Melbourne	Mia Austin	
10 December	Hawthorn / St Kilda	Hawthorn	Pick 67	
10 December	Hawthorn / St Kilda	Hawthorn	2026 St Kilda fourth-round pick	
10 December	Hawthorn / St Kilda	St Kilda	Sophie Butterworth	
10 December	Hawthorn / St Kilda	St Kilda	Pick 87	
10 December	Brisbane / Collingwood	Brisbane	Lily-Rose Williamson	
10 December	Brisbane / Collingwood	Brisbane	Pick 17→	
10 December	Brisbane / Collingwood	Brisbane	2026 Collingwood second-round pick	
10 December	Brisbane / Collingwood	Collingwood	Pick 15	
10 December	Brisbane / Collingwood	Collingwood	Pick 29	
10 December	Brisbane / Collingwood	Collingwood	Pick 47	
10 December	Adelaide / Brisbane / Carlton	Adelaide	Pick 17 (from Brisbane)	
10 December	Adelaide / Brisbane / Carlton	Adelaide	2026 Melbourne third-round pick (from Carlton)	
10 December	Adelaide / Brisbane / Carlton	Brisbane	2026 Adelaide second-round pick (from Adelaide)	
10 December	Adelaide / Brisbane / Carlton	Brisbane	2026 Fremantle second-round pick (from Carlton)	
10 December	Adelaide / Brisbane / Carlton	Carlton	Brooke Boileau (from Adelaide)	
10 December	Carlton / North Melbourne	Carlton	2026 North Melbourne fifth-round pick	
10 December	Carlton / North Melbourne	North Melbourne	Maddison Torpey	
10 December	Hawthorn / North Melbourne	Hawthorn	Niamh Martin	
10 December	Hawthorn / North Melbourne	North Melbourne	2026 Port Adelaide third-round pick	
10 December	Hawthorn / North Melbourne	North Melbourne	2026 Sydney third-round pick	
10 December	Port Adelaide / West Coast	Port Adelaide	Lucy Boyd	
10 December	Port Adelaide / West Coast	Port Adelaide	Pick 30	
10 December	Port Adelaide / West Coast	Port Adelaide	2026 West Coast third-round pick	
10 December	Port Adelaide / West Coast	West Coast	Lily Paterson	
10 December	Port Adelaide / West Coast	West Coast	Pick 36	
10 December	Port Adelaide / West Coast	West Coast	2026 Brisbane fourth-round pick	
10 December	Greater Western Sydney / Hawthorn	Greater Western Sydney	Tilly Lucas-Rodd	
10 December	Greater Western Sydney / Hawthorn	Greater Western Sydney	2026 Hawthorn fourth-round pick	
10 December	Greater Western Sydney / Hawthorn	Hawthorn	2026 Brisbane second-round pick	
10 December	Greater Western Sydney / Hawthorn	Hawthorn	2026 Greater Western Sydney second-round pick	
10 December	Greater Western Sydney / Hawthorn	Hawthorn	2026 Greater Western Sydney third-round pick	
10 December	Fremantle / Richmond	Fremantle	Pick 40	
10 December	Fremantle / Richmond	Fremantle	2026 Gold Coast third-round pick	
10 December	Fremantle / Richmond	Fremantle	2026 North Melbourne fourth-round pick	
10 December	Fremantle / Richmond	Richmond	Dana East	
10 December	Fremantle / Richmond	Richmond	Pick 63	
10 December	Fremantle / Richmond	Richmond	2026 Fremantle third-round pick	

=== Summary ===
The following table summarises the players and picks that were traded in and out of each club during the trade period (excluding picks that were later on-traded).

Club	In	Out
Adelaide	Grace Egan, 4, 13, 17, 39, 60, GC2026R1, ESS2026R3, MEL2026R3	Brooke Boileau, Anne Hatchard, Zoe Prowse, 14, 32, 50, 2026R1, 2026R2, 2026R4
Brisbane	Lily-Rose Williamson, 11, 33, GWS2026ER1, ADE2026R2, COL2026R2, FRE2026R2	Poppy Boltz, Ellie Hampson, Taylor Smith, 18, 36, 2026R2, 2026R4
Carlton	Lauren Bella, Brooke Boileau, Claudia Whitfort, 66, NM2026R5, WC2026R5	Mia Austin, Keeley Skepper, Maddison Torpey, 2026R1, 2026R3, 2026R4
Collingwood	Ariana Hetherington, 15, 26, 29, 47	Mikala Cann, Lily-Rose Williamson, 23, 2026R2, 2026R3
Essendon	Zoe Prowse, 49, 50, ADE2026R4	24, 42, 60, 2026R2, 2026R3
Fremantle	Lily Johnson, Eden Zanker, 35, 40, GC2026R3, MEL2026R4, NM2026R4	Dana East, 9, 27, 63, 81, 2026R2, 2026R3
Geelong		
Gold Coast	Anne Hatchard, 19, 21, 22, 23, 27, 32, NM2026R2, BRI2026R3, WB2026R3	Lauren Bella, Claudia Whitfort, 1, 38, 56, 2026R1, 2026R2, 2026R3
Greater Western Sydney	Poppy Boltz, Tilly Lucas-Rodd, ADE2026R1, HAW2026R4	21, 39, 2026ER1, 2026R2, 2026R3
Hawthorn	Niamh Martin, 67, SYD2026R1, BRI2026R2, GWS2026R2, GWS2026R3, STK2026R4	Sophie Butterworth, Tilly Lucas-Rodd, 15, 33, 87, 2026R4
Melbourne	Mia Austin, 9, 14, 81, GC2026R2	Lily Johnson, Eden Zanker, 17, 35, 2026R3, 2026R4
North Melbourne	Maddison Torpey, 48, CAR2026R1, CAR2026R3, COL2026R3, PA2026R3, SYD2026R3	Ariana Hetherington, Niamh Martin, Ella Slocombe, Georgia Stubs, 19, 2026R2, 2026R4, 2026R5
Port Adelaide	Lucy Boyd, Ellie Hampson, 30, WC2026R3	Lily Paterson, 28, 46, 2026R3
Richmond	Dana East, Georgia Stubs, 1, 38, 56, 63, FRE2026R3	Grace Egan, 4, 22, 40, 2026R4
St Kilda	Sophie Butterworth, 24, 42, 87, ESS2026R2	13, 49, 67 2026R4
Sydney	Taylor Smith, 18, 28, 46	11, 29, 47, 2026R1, 2026R3
West Coast	Lily Paterson, Keeley Skepper, Ella Slocombe, 36, BRI2026R4, CAR2026R4, RIC2026R4	Lucy Boyd, 30, 48, 66, 2026R3, 2026R5
Western Bulldogs	Mikala Cann	26, 2026R3

== Delisted free agency ==
Name	New club	Previous club	Date	Ref.
Charlotte Brewer	Collingwood	Carlton	8 December 2025	
Alissa Brook	Geelong	Port Adelaide	9 December 2025	
Jasmin Stewart	Geelong	Port Adelaide	9 December 2025	
Jemma Rigoni	Collingwood	Melbourne	12 December 2025	

== Draft ==
The national draft was held on 15 December 2025. The inaugural pre-season draft, staged in the weeks leading up to start of pre-season training ahead of the 2026 season, was held on 4 May 2026.

== Replacement players ==
Where players were moved to inactive list after the draft had taken place, due to injury, personal reasons, retirement or pregnancy, the clubs were allowed to recruit replacement players.

Name	Club	Recruited from		Replacing	Date	Ref.
Name	Club	Club	League	Replacing	Date	Ref.
Kiara Bischa	Carlton	Gold Coast	AFL Women's	Breann Harrington (pregnancy)	18 May 2026	
Paige Price	Gold Coast	Box Hill	VFL Women's	Georgia Clayden (pregnancy)	25 May 2026	
Poppy Stockwell	Hawthorn	Fremantle	AFL Women's	Aileen Gilroy (retirement)	4 June 2026	
Juliet Kelly	Adelaide	Claremont	WAFL Women's	Brooke Smith (injury)	15 June 2026	
Grace Parsons	Port Adelaide	Sydney Swans Academy	Talent League Girls	Jemma Charity (injury)	17 June 2026	
Abby Favell	North Melbourne	North Melbourne	VFL Women's	Amy Smith (injury)	24 June 2026	
Natasha Entwistle	West Coast	South Fremantle	WAFL Women's	Mikayla Western (injury)	26 June 2026	
Matilda Van Berkel	Hawthorn	Box Hill	VFL Women's	Emily Everist (injury)	28 June 2026	
Alice Tentye	Adelaide	Woodville-West Torrens	SANFL Women's League	Danielle Ponter (pregnancy)	1 July 2026	
Emma Juneja	Sydney	Sydney University	Sydney Women's AFL	Alice Mitchell (injury)	7 July 2026	
Georgia Clark	Greater Western Sydney	Collingwood	AFL Women's	Scarlett Johnson (injury)	17 July 2026	
Madison Evans	Brisbane	South Fremantle	WAFL Women's	Caitlin Kennedy (injury)	24 July 2026	
Dom Carbone	Collingwood	Collingwood	VFL Women's	Matilda Argus (injury)	27 July 2026	
Jemmika Douglas	Adelaide	North Melbourne	VFL Women's	Chelsea Randall (retirement)	28 July 2026	
Keyshia Matenga	Brisbane	Wilston Grange	QAFL Women's	Olivia Lacy (injury)	4 August 2026	
Isabella Shannon	West Coast	Perth	WAFL Women's	Lily Smart (injury)	5 August 2026	
Annabelle Embelton	Hawthorn	Box Hill Hawks	VFL Women's	Matilda Van Berkel (injury)	6 August 2026	
Emily Elkington	Port Adelaide	Carlton	VFL Women's	Caitlin Wendland (injury)	12 August 2026	
