= 2018 AFL Women's Under-18 Championships =

AFL Women's Under-18 Championships
- 2018

Tournament information
- Sport: Australian rules football
- Dates: 25 May–13 July
- Tournament format: Round-robin
- Venue(s): Blacktown International Sportspark; Bond University; Broadbeach Sports Club; Domain Stadium; GMHBA Stadium; TIO Stadium
- Teams: 8 (series 1); 6 (series 2)

Final positions
- Champions: Vic Country (de facto)

Tournament statistics
- Matches played: 16
- MVPs: Nina Morrison (Vic Country); Maddy Prespakis (Vic Metro)

The 2018 NAB AFL Women's Under-18 Championships was played between May and July 2018, with six teams competing in the main 'Series 2' round robin tournament and with a further four playing in a two-match on-on-one exhibition as the competition's initial 'Series 1'.

== Format ==
The competition was opened with 'Series 1', a set of closed competitions between four pairs of teams representing the country's eight largest states and territories. In 'Series 2' teams representing Vic Country, Vic Metro, Queensland and Western Australia were joined by Central and Eastern Allies teams representing teams of the combined regions of Northern Territory and South Australia (Central) as well as New South Wales, ACT and Tasmania (Eastern). Each team played a total of three matches in that series.

Vic Country finished the round-robin 'Series 2' as the only team undefeated in that series, making them the de facto tournament winners. The competition's best player award was jointly won by Vic Country's Nina Morrison and by the previous year's outright winner, Maddy Prespakis of Vic Metro.

== Fixture ==
=== Series 1 ===
	Northern Territory vs. South Australia
Friday, 25 May	Northern Territory 6.2 (38)	def. by	South Australia 9.13 (67)	TIO Stadium	Results
Sunday, 27 May	Northern Territory 0.1 (1)	def. by	South Australia 10.9 (69)	TIO Stadium	Results

	NSW/ACT vs. Tasmania
Friday, 1 June	NSW/ACT 6.7 (43)	def.	Tasmania 1.1 (7)	Blacktown International Sportspark	Results
Sunday, 3 June	NSW/ACT 6.8 (44)	def.	Tasmania 0.3 (3)	Blacktown International Sportspark	Results

	Western Australia vs. Queensland
Saturday, 2 June	Western Australia 4.6 (30)	def.	Queensland 3.9 (27)	Domain Stadium	Results
Monday, 4 June	Western Australia 6.4 (40)	def.	Queensland 2.3 (15)	Domain Stadium	Results

	Vic Country vs. Vic Metro
Saturday, 16 June	Vic Country 2.5 (17)	def. by	Vic Metro 4.5 (29)	GMHBA Stadium	Results

=== Series 2 ===
	Round 1
Monday, 9 July	Queensland 1.5 (11)	def. by	Vic Country 10.7 (67)	Metricon Stadium	Results
Monday, 9 July	Vic Metro 7.9 (51)	def.	Western Australia 6.7 (43)	Metricon Stadium	Results
Monday, 9 July	Eastern Allies 6.8 (44)	def.	Central Allies 2.4 (16)	Metricon Stadium	Results

	Round 2
Wednesday, 11 July	Queensland 4.3 (27)	def.	Vic Metro 3.1 (19)	Broadbeach Sports Club	Results
Wednesday, 11 July	Vic Country 6.6 (42)	def.	Central Allies 3.1 (19)	Broadbeach Sports Club	Results
Wednesday, 11 July	Western Australia 7.3 (45)	def.	Eastern Allies 2.3 (15)	Broadbeach Sports Club	Results

	Round 3
Friday, 13 July	Vic Metro 10.6 (66)	def.	Central Allies 3.3 (21)	Bond University	Results
Friday, 13 July	Queensland 5.5 (35)	def.	Eastern Allies 2.6 (18)	Bond University	Results
Friday, 13 July	Vic Country 7.11 (53)	def.	Western Australia 2.5 (17)	Bond University	Results

== All-Australian team ==
The 2018 Women's All-Australian team was decided following an all-star exhibition match between members of the 48-player squad. 13 of the players named were 'top-aged' and draft eligible that year, while the remaining nine were 'bottom-aged'.

2018 Under 18 Women's All-Australian team
B:	Serene Watson (Qld)	Lucinda Cripps (VC)	Nat Grider (Qld)
HB:	Jordyn Allen (VC)	McKenzie Dowrick (WA)	Sabreena Duffy (WA)
C:	Georgia Patrikios (VM)	Maddy Prespakis (VM)	Nina Morrison (VC)
HF:	Sophie Van De Heuvel (VC)	Gabby Newton (VM)	Belle Dawes (Qld)
F:	Daisy Bateman (VM)	Lucy McEvoy (VC)	Montana McKinnon (SA)
Foll:	Lauren Bella (Qld)	Alyce Parker (NSW/ACT) (captain)	Tyla Hanks (VC)
Int:	Jacqui Yorston (Qld)	Lily Postlethwaite (Qld)	Olivia Purcell (VC)
Int:	Eleanor Brown (VM)		
Coach:	Not named		

=== Initial squad ===
- NSW/ACT: Brianna McFarlane, Alexia Hamilton, Alyce Parker
- Northern Territory: Janet Baird
- Queensland: Lauren Bella, Belle Dawes, Kitara Farrar, Nat Grider, Tori Groves-Little, Charlotte Hammans, Dee Heslop, Lily Postlethwaite, Serene Watson, Jacqui Yorston
- South Australia: Nikki Gore, Montana McKinnon, Katelyn Rosenzweig
- Tasmania: Mia King
- Victoria Country: Jordyn Allen, Rene Caris, Georgia Clarke, Lucinda Cripps, Tyla Hanks, Courtney Jones, Lucy McEvoy, Nina Morrison, Olivia Purcell, Denby Taylor, Sophie Van De Heuvel, Rebecca Webster
- Victoria Metro: Daisy Bateman, Eleanor Brown, Mikala Cann, Isabella Grant, Katie Lynch, Hannah McLaren, Abbie McKay, Georgia MacPherson, Gabby Newton, Georgia Patrikios, Maddy Prespakis, Emerson Woods
- Western Australia: Kate Bartlett, Mikayla Bowen, McKenzie Dowrick, Sabreena Duffy, Rikki Ryan-Carling, Matilda Sergeant

== Team MVPs ==
At the conclusion of the tournament each competing team named their best player for the tournament. The winner of these 'most valuable player' awards are as follows:

Team	Player
NSW/ACT	Alyce Parker
Northern Territory	Tabitha May
Queensland	Nat Grider
South Australia	Montana McKinnon
Tasmania	Mia King
Vic Country	Nina Morrison
Vic Metro	Maddy Prespakis
Western Australia	Sabreena Duffy
Central Allies (NT and SA)	Janet Baird
Eastern Allies (NSW/ACT and Tas)	Alyce Parker
