= 2023 AFL Women's supplementary draft =

Eighth AFL Women's (AFLW) draft

General information
- Date(s): 4 April 2023
- Sponsored by: National Australia Bank

Overview
- League: AFL Women's

The 2023 AFL Women's supplementary draft was the draft that enabled the 18 clubs in the AFL Women's competition to recruit overage players prior to the 2023 AFL Women's season.

On October 19, 2022, the AFL announced that the draft would be a once-off overage national draft, to be held on Tuesday, 4 April, 2023. This was a stop-gap measure due to the shortened seasons between season 7 and the 2023 season, and there being no underage competition between the last draft in June 2022 and this one. Only players aged over 19 were eligible to be drafted.

== Draft ==
Table of draft selections
Rd.	Pick	Player	Club	Recruited from		Notes
Rd.	Pick	Player	Club	Club	League	Notes
1	1	Erin Hoare	Geelong	Geelong	VFLW	←Sydney
1	2	Jasmin Stewart	Port Adelaide	Claremont	WAFLW	
1	3	Tahleah Mulder	Fremantle	South Fremantle	WAFLW	←West Coast
1	4	Mattea Breed	Hawthorn	North Adelaide	SANFLW	
1	5	Lulu Beatty	Carlton	Carlton	VFLW	
1	6	Cara McCrossan	Gold Coast	Casey Demons	VFLW	←St Kilda
1	7	Emmelie Fiedler	Fremantle	East Fremantle	WAFLW	
1	8	Caitlin Miller	Greater Western Sydney	Southport	QAFLW	
1	9	Madeline Hendrie	Carlton	Western Bulldogs	VFLW	←Essendon
1	10	Meara Girvan	Gold Coast	Bond University	QAFLW	
1	11	Dominique Carruthers	Western Bulldogs	Western Bulldogs	VFLW	
1	12	Katelyn Pope	Port Adelaide	North Adelaide	SANFLW	←Geelong
1	13	Eleri Morris	Collingwood	Collingwood	VFLW	
1	14	Selena Karlson	Collingwood	Collingwood	VFLW	←St Kilda←Richmond
1	15	Passed	Western Bulldogs	—	—	←Collingwood←North Melbourne
1	16	Georgie Jaques	Port Adelaide	Norwood	SANFLW	←Adelaide
1	17	Poppy Boltz	Brisbane	Southport	QAFLW	
2	18	Jae Flynn	Fremantle	East Fremantle	WAFLW	←West Coast
2	19	Kristy Stratton	Hawthorn	Box Hill Hawks	VFLW	
2	20	Marianna Anthony	Carlton	North Melbourne	VFLW	
2	21	Bethany Pinchin	St Kilda	Southern Saints	VFLW	
2	22	Joanne Cregg	Fremantle	Subiaco	WAFLW	
2	23	Annise Bradfield	Greater Western Sydney	Gold Coast	AFLW	
2	24	Passed	Gold Coast	—	—	
2	25	Passed	Western Bulldogs	—	—	
2	26	Ruby Tripodi	North Melbourne	Williamstown	VFLW	←St Kilda←Collingwood
2	27	Shelby Knoll	Richmond	Casey Demons	VFLW	
3	28	Chloe Wrigley	Carlton	Peel Thunder	WAFLW	
4	29	Yvonne Bonner	Adelaide	Donegal GAA	Ladies' Gaelic Football	

== Free agency and replacement signings ==
Where players were moved to inactive list after the draft had taken place, club were entitled to replace them by free agency signing.

Free agent or replacement signings
Club	Player	Reason	Former club	Former league	Ref
Adelaide	Brooke Smith	Replacement (Dowrick)	Casey Demons	VFLW	
Brisbane	Analea McKee	Replacement (Farquharson)	Geelong	VFLW	
Brisbane	Caitlin Wendland	Replacement (Yoshida-Martin)	Central District	SANFLW	
Brisbane	Brooke Sheridan	Replacement (Lutkins)	University of Queensland	QAFLW	
Carlton	Gen Lawson-Tavan	Replacement (Guerin)	Sydney	AFLW	
Essendon	Matilda Dyke	Replacement (Phillips)	Claremont	WAFLW	
Fremantle	Ariana Hetherington	Replacement (Morrison)	South Fremantle	WAFLW	
Gold Coast	Darcie Davies	Replacement (Ransom)	Southport	QAFLW	
Greater Western Sydney	Teagan Germech	Replacement (Mackrill)	Belconnen	AFL Canberra Women's	
Greater Western Sydney	Rene Caris	Replacement (Gaffney)	Collingwood	VFLW	
Melbourne	Saraid Taylor	Replacement (Johnson)	Richmond	AFLW	
North Melbourne	Lucy Burke	Replacement (Hardiman)	St Kilda	AFLW	
North Melbourne	Ailish Considine	Replacement (Wall)	Adelaide	AFLW	
Richmond	Charli Wicksteed	Replacement (Lavey)	South Fremantle	WAFLW	
Richmond	Lilly Pearce	Replacement (Williams)	Southport	QAFLW	
St Kilda	Maddie Boyd	Replacement (Van Dyk)	Box Hill Hawks	VFLW	
Sydney	Tanya Kennedy	Replacement (Bullas)	Donegal GAA	N/A	
West Coast	Mackenzie Webb	Replacement (Petrevski)	Claremont	WAFLW	
Western Bulldogs	Maggie Gorham	Free agent (unrestricted)	Ainslie	AFL Canberra Women's	
Western Bulldogs	Brianna McFarlane	Free agent (unrestricted)	Western Bulldogs	VFLW	
