= Nat Grider =

Australian rules footballer (born 2000)

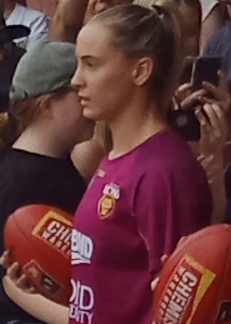

Personal information
- Full name: Natalie Jade Grider
- Born: 10 October 2000 (age 26); Brisbane, Queensland
- Original team: University of Queensland (QWAFL)
- Draft: No. 22, 2018 AFL Women's draft
- Debut: Round 4, 2019, Brisbane vs. Western Bulldogs, at Whitten Oval
- Height: 171 cm (5 ft 7 in)
- Position: Half-back/Midfield

Club information
- Current club: Brisbane
- Number: 10

Playing career^{1}
Years	Club	Games (Goals)
2019–	Brisbane	85 (0)
- ^{1} Playing statistics correct to the end of the 2025 season.

Career highlights
- AFLW premiership player: 2021, 2023; 2× AFL Women's All-Australian team: 2022 (S6), 2022 (S7)

Natalie "Nat" Grider (born 10 October 2000) is an Australian rules footballer playing for Brisbane in the AFL Women's competition (AFLW).

== Junior and state football ==
Grider was raised in Brisbane, Queensland and began playing Australian rules football as a teenager with the junior Jindalee Jags club in suburban Jindalee. She was also a member of the Brisbane Lions Academy and excelled for the club in the 2018 Winter Series against Greater Western Sydney and Gold Coast. After three years at Jindalee Jags, in 2017, Grider joined the University of Queensland in the AFL Queensland Women's League (QWAFL). In the 2018 season she won the QWAFL Rising Star Award, was selected in the QWAFL Team of the Year, and shared the club's best and fairest award with Megan Hunt and Jane Childes. In 2019, she was selected again for the QWAFL Team of the Year. Grider represented Queensland in the AFL Women's Under 18 Championships. In the 2018 AFL Women's Under 18 Championships she led the team as captain, was selected for the All-Australian team, and was selected as Queensland's most valuable player.

== AFLW career ==
Grider was drafted to the AFL Women's (AFLW) by Brisbane with the 22nd pick in the 2018 AFL Women's draft, joining her long-time teammate Gabby Collingwood. She made her AFLW debut in the Lions' round 4 game against Western Bulldogs at Whitten Oval on 23 February 2019 as a late replacement for captain Leah Kaslar. She played two games in her debut season. In April 2019, Grider re-committed to Brisbane for the 2020 season. She played every game of the season, shutting down small forwards and steadily disposing the ball out of the back-line. She raised her game every week and culminated the season with the club nominating her for the 2020 AFLW Players' Association's Most Valuable Player Award along with Emily Bates and Kate Lutkins. The 2021 AFL Women's season saw Grider rapidly improve, besting her averages in disposals, kicks, handballs, marks and tackles. She received a 2021 AFL Women's Rising Star nomination in the third round of the season after an impressive game against West Coast where she collected 16 disposals, 7 marks and 2 tackles. The first three rounds of the season saw her become the Lions' leading disposal getter. Grider signed on with Brisbane for one more year on 15 June 2021.

== Statistics ==
Statistics correct to the end of round 3, 2021.

Legend
G	Goals	K	Kicks	D	Disposals	T	Tackles
B	Behinds	H	Handballs	M	Marks

Season	Team	No.	Games	Totals							Averages (per game)							Votes
Season	Team	No.	Games	G	B	K	H	D	M	T	G	B	K	H	D	M	T	Votes
2019	Brisbane	17	2	0	0	5	5	10	3	4	0.0	0.0	2.5	2.5	5.0	1.5	2.0	0
2020	Brisbane	10	7	0	0	29	28	57	7	20	0.0	0.0	4.1	4.0	8.1	1.0	2.9	0
2021	Brisbane	10	3	0	0	27	25	52	7	16	0.0	0.0	9.0	8.3	17.3	2.3	5.3	
Career			12	0	0	61	58	119	17	40	0.0	0.0	5.1	4.8	9.9	1.4	3.3	0

== Playing style ==
Grider can play as a half-back or as a midfielder and demonstrates athleticism and strong marking skills.

== Personal life ==
Grider was born and raised in Brisbane. She is a supporter of Brisbane Lions, despite her mum supporting St Kilda and her dad supporting Carlton. She studied at the University of Queensland and received a Bachelor of Exercise and Sports Science.
