= 2022 AFL Women's season 6 Rising Star =

- Sponsored by: National Australia Bank
- Date: 5 April 2022
- Venue: Crown Melbourne
- Hosted by: Sarah Jones
- Winner: Mimi Hill (Carlton)

Television/radio coverage
- Network: Fox Footy

The 2022 AFL Women's season 6 Rising Star award was presented to the player adjudged the best young player during 2022 AFL Women's season 6. Mimi Hill of the Carlton Football Club won the award with 43 votes.

== Eligibility ==
Every round, two nominations will be given to standout young players who performed well during that particular round. To be eligible for nomination, players must have been under 21 years of age on 1 January 2022 and not suspended during the season.

== Nominations ==
Table of nominees
Round	Player	Club	Ref.
1	Mia King	North Melbourne	
1	Georgie Prespakis	Geelong	
2	Alyssa Bannan	Melbourne	
2	Charlie Rowbottom	Gold Coast	
3	Zimmorlei Farquharson	Brisbane	
3	Megan Fitzsimon	Melbourne	
4	Keeley Sherar	Carlton	
4	Sarah Verrier	Fremantle	
5	Mimi Hill	Carlton	
5	Montana McKinnon	Adelaide	
6	Ellie Hampson	Gold Coast	
6	Mikayla Morrison	Fremantle	
7	Isabella Eddey	North Melbourne	
7	Elisabeth Georgostathis	Western Bulldogs	
8	Teah Charlton	Adelaide	
8	Eliza James	Collingwood	
9	Dana East	Fremantle	
9	Nell Morris-Dalton	Western Bulldogs	
10	Darcy Moloney	Geelong	
10	Isabelle Pritchard	Western Bulldogs	

Table of nominations by club
Number	Club	Player	Nom.
3	Fremantle	Sarah Verrier	4
3	Fremantle	Mikayla Morrison	6
3	Fremantle	Dana East	9
3	Western Bulldogs	Elisabeth Georgostathis	7
3	Western Bulldogs	Nell Morris-Dalton	9
3	Western Bulldogs	Isabelle Pritchard	10
2	Adelaide	Montana McKinnon	5
2	Adelaide	Teah Charlton	8
2	Carlton	Keeley Sherar	4
2	Carlton	Mimi Hill	5
2	Geelong	Georgie Prespakis	1
2	Geelong	Darcy Moloney	10
2	Gold Coast	Charlie Rowbottom	2
2	Gold Coast	Ellie Hampson	6
2	Melbourne	Alyssa Bannan	2
2	Melbourne	Megan Fitzsimon	3
2	North Melbourne	Mia King	1
2	North Melbourne	Isabella Eddey	7
1	Brisbane	Zimmorlei Farquharson	3
1	Collingwood	Eliza James	8

== Final voting ==
Table of votes
Placing	Player	Club	Nom.	Votes
1	Mimi Hill	Carlton	5	43
2	Charlie Rowbottom	Gold Coast	2	42
3	Mia King	North Melbourne	1	33
4	Georgie Prespakis	Geelong	1	20
5	Alyssa Bannan	Melbourne	2	5
