= Charlotte Hammans =

Australian rules footballer

Personal information
- Born: 18 March 2001 (age 25)
- Original teams: Bond University (QAFLW); Burleigh Bombettes (QFAW)
- Draft: 2019 Pre-list signing
- Debut: Round 1, 2021, Carlton vs. Collingwood, at Ikon Park
- Height: 172 cm (5 ft 8 in)
- Position: Forward

Club information
- Current club: Carlton
- Number: 17

Playing career^{1}
Years	Club	Games (Goals)
2020	Gold Coast	0 (0)
2021–	Carlton	3 (0)
- ^{1} Playing statistics correct to the end of the 2021 season.

Charlotte Hammans (born 18 March 2001) is an Australian rules footballer playing for the Carlton Football Club in the AFL Women's (AFLW).

== Early football ==
Hammans signed with the Gold Coast Suns Academy and was named in the initial squad of the 2018 Under 18s All Australian team after kicking 4 goals in 5 games in the 2018 AFL Women's Under 18 Championships.

== AFL career ==
She was selected by Gold Coast as a pre list signed player in the 2019 AFL Women's draft, but did not play any games with Gold Coast, and was traded to Carlton in August 2020. She made her debut against Collingwood at Ikon Park in the opening round of the 2021 season.

== Statistics ==
Statistics are correct to the end of round 3, 2021.

Legend
G	Goals	K	Kicks	D	Disposals	T	Tackles
B	Behinds	H	Handballs	M	Marks

Season	Team	No.	Games	Totals							Averages (per game)							Votes
Season	Team	No.	Games	G	B	K	H	D	M	T	G	B	K	H	D	M	T	Votes
2020	Gold Coast	-	-	-	-	-	-	-	-	-	-	-	-	-	-	-	-	-
2021	Carlton	17	2	0	0	7	4	11	1	5	0.0	0.0	3.5	2.0	5.5	0.5	2.5	
Career			2	0	0	7	4	11	1	5	0.0	0.0	3.5	2.0	5.5	0.5	2.5	0

== Honours and achievements ==
- Initial Squad - AFL Women's Under 18 Championships member (2019)
