= Lily Postlethwaite =

Australian rules footballer (born 2001)

Personal information
- Born: 29 October 2001 (age 25); Caboolture, Queensland
- Original team: Maroochydore (QWAFL)
- Draft: No. 3, 2019 AFL Women's draft
- Debut: Round 1, 2020, Brisbane vs. Adelaide, at Hickey Park
- Height: 163 cm (5 ft 4 in)
- Position: Midfielder/Forward

Club information
- Current club: Brisbane
- Number: 6

Playing career^{1}
Years	Club	Games (Goals)
2020–	Brisbane	25 (5)
- ^{1} Playing statistics correct to the end of the 2023 season.

Career highlights
- AFLW premiership player: 2023

Lily Postlethwaite (/ˈpɒsəlweɪt/ POSS-əl-wayt; born 29 October 2001) is an Australian rules footballer playing for Brisbane in the AFL Women's competition (AFLW).

== Early life and state football ==
Postlethwaite was raised on a farm in the northern Brisbane suburb of Caboolture, Queensland.

Postlethwaite started her sporting career playing Oztag, the Australian variation of tag rugby, and started playing Australian rules football only at the age of 12. In 2014 she won the most valuable player award for Oztag's 13 Girls Division. Postlethwaite played for Moreton Bay Lions and won the under-15 division best and fairest in 2016. Postlethwaite played for Maroochydore in the AFL Queensland Women's League (QWAFL). In the 2019 season she won the QWAFL Rising Star Award. During 2019, Postlethwaite also played for the Brisbane Lions Academy team. Postlethwaite represented Queensland in the AFL Women's Under 18 Championships. In the 2018 AFL Women's Under 18 Championships, she was selected for the All-Australian team. In the 2019 AFL Women's Under 18 Championships she led the team as captain and was selected once again for the All-Australian team.

== AFLW career ==
Postlethwaite was drafted by Brisbane with the third pick in the 2019 AFL Women's draft. She made her debut in Brisbane's opening round game against Adelaide at Hickey Park on 8 February 2020.

== Personal life ==
Postlethwaite is from Caboolture in Queensland and grew up supporting Brisbane Lions. She grew up on a farm and used the horse track for some unorthodox training and conditioning while at home.
