= Mimi Hill =

Australian rules footballer (born 2002)

Personal information
- Born: 4 October 2002 (age 24)
- Original team: Oakleigh Chargers (NAB League Girls)
- Draft: No. 12, 2020 national draft
- Debut: 28 January 2021, Western Bulldogs vs. Collingwood, at Princes Park
- Height: 166 cm (5 ft 5 in)
- Position: Wing / Half-back

Club information
- Current club: Carlton
- Number: 10

Playing career^{1}
Years	Club	Games (Goals)
2021–	Carlton	54 (9)
- ^{1} Playing statistics correct to the end of the 2025 season.

Career highlights
- AFL Women's Rising Star: 2022 (S6); Carlton best and fairest: 2022 (S7)

Mimi Hill (born 4 October 2002) is an Australian rules footballer playing for Carlton in the AFL Women's (AFLW). She was drafted with the twelfth selection in the 2020 AFL Women's draft by the Carlton.

In Season 6, Hill won the Rising Star award and in Season 7 she was the Club’s Best and Fairest winner. In 2023 Mimi Hill was elected Co-Vice Captain and continues to be Vice Captain in 2025 alongside fellow midfielder and Carlton Captain Abbie McKay.

== Early life ==
Hill played junior football for the Kew Comets in the Yarra Junior Football League for around three years. Hill spent two years playing for the Old Scotch Football Club, where was named best on ground while playing for them in the Victorian Amateur Football Association for the premiership. Cited as a natural leader from a young age, Hill was appointed the captain of the Oakleigh Chargers in her bottom age year. She played 10 games in her first season at the Chargers, where she averaged 16.8 disposals, and 2 in her second, where she averaged 24.5 disposals, only playing 2 due to the impact of the COVID-19 pandemic. She represented Vic Metro in the Under 16s championships and 2019 AFL Women's Under 18 Championships. She played two games for Vic Metro in 2019, where she averaged 25 disposals a game.

Hill attended Methodist Ladies College in Kew, Victoria, where she was appointed school captain in both Year 11 and Year 12.

== AFLW career ==
Hill debuted in the opening round of the 2021 AFL Women's season, in Carlton's 6 point loss to Collingwood. On debut, she collected 12 disposals, 2 marks and a tackle. Hill injured her knee in Round 6. She signed a two-year contract with Carlton on 10 June 2021, after it was revealed the team had conducted a mass re-signing of 13 players.

== Statistics ==
Statistics are correct to the end of the 2025 season.

Legend
G	Goals	K	Kicks	D	Disposals	T	Tackles
B	Behinds	H	Handballs	M	Marks

Season	Team	No.	Games	Totals							Averages (per game)							Votes
Season	Team	No.	Games	G	B	K	H	D	M	T	G	B	K	H	D	M	T	Votes
2021	Carlton	10	6	2	0	26	48	74	8	5	0.3	0.0	4.3	8.0	12.3	1.3	0.8	0
2022	Carlton	10	6	0	1	64	65	129	16	14	0.0	0.2	10.7	10.8	21.5	2.7	2.3	2
2022	Carlton	10	10	1	1	118	114	232	21	28	0.1	0.1	11.8	11.4	23.2	2.1	2.8	5
2023	Carlton	10	10	1	3	90	128	218	18	49	0.1	0.3	9.0	12.8	21.8	1.8	4.9	1
2024	Carlton	10	10	1	0	109	121	230	14	29	0.1	0.0	10.9	12.1	23.0	1.4	2.9	1
2025	Carlton	10	12	4	3	134	142	276	25	40	0.3	0.3	11.2	11.8	23.0	2.1	3.3	9
Career			54	9	8	541	618	1159	102	165	0.2	0.1	10.0	11.4	21.5	1.9	3.1	18
