= 2022 AFL Women's Rising Star =

2022 AFL Women's Rising Star may refer to:

- 2022 AFL Women's season 6 Rising Star, for the season that took place from January to April
- 2022 AFL Women's season 7 Rising Star, for the season that took place from August to November
