= Nell Morris-Dalton =

Female Australian rules footballer

Personal information
- Full name: Nell Morris-Dalton
- Born: 5 April 2001 (age 25)
- Original team: Northern Knights (NAB League)
- Draft: No. 6, 2019 national draft
- Debut: Round 6, 2020, Western Bulldogs vs. Fremantle, at VU Whitten Oval
- Height: 176 cm (5 ft 9 in)
- Position: Forward

Club information
- Current club: Carlton

Playing career^{1}
Years	Club	Games (Goals)
2020–2022 (S7)	Western Bulldogs	20 (8)
2023–2025	Collingwood	18 (12)
Total		38 (20)
- ^{1} Playing statistics correct to the end of the 2025 season.

Nell Morris-Dalton (born 5 April 2001) is an Australian rules footballer who plays for Carlton. She played four seasons for Western Bulldogs and three seasons for Collingwood in the AFL Women's (AFLW).

== State football ==
Morris-Dalton developed her football skills in Victoria, coming through the junior ranks as a forward. She played for the Northern Knights in the NAB League Girls competition, where during the 2019 season, she kicked eight goals in nine games, helping lead the Knights through an unbeaten home-and-away campaign to win a premiership. At state level, Morris-Dalton represented Vic Metro at the 2019 AFL Women's Under-18 Championships, scoring two goals against Vic County, one goal against Western Australia and Queensland, and two more goals against Eastern Allies. Later, she joined VFL Women's club Darebin, for whom she kicked four goals in five games.

== AFLW career ==
=== Western Bulldogs ===
Morris-Dalton was drafted by the Western Bulldogs with their 6th pick of the 2019 national draft. She made her debut for the club in round 6 of the 2020 AFL Women's season against Fremantle at Whitten Oval. It was revealed that Morris-Dalton had signed a contract extension with the club on 16 June 2021, after playing 5 games for the club that season. In March 2022, she was nominated for the 2022 AFL Women's season 6 Rising Star award, following her best-on-ground performance against West Coast, collecting 12 disposals, three marks, and kicking two goals. Morris-Dalton didn't manage to establish herself at the Western Bulldogs, managing to kick only eight goals in 20 games over four seasons.

=== Collingwood ===
In March 2023, Morris-Dalton was traded to Collingwood in exchange for pick #15. During the 2023 AFL Women's season, she kicked eight goals and finished as leading goalkicker of the team, resulting in her signing a two-year contract extension in November 2023. Unfortunately, she was placed on the inactive list for the 2024 AFL Women's season due to a stress fracture in her lumbar region. Following her injury, Morris-Dalton returned to play, appearing in eight games during the 2025 AFL Women's season, and was delisted at the end of the season.

== Statistics ==
Statistics are correct to the end of the 2025 season.

Legend
G	Goals	K	Kicks	D	Disposals	T	Tackles
B	Behinds	H	Handballs	M	Marks

Season	Team	No.	Games	Totals							Averages (per game)						
Season	Team	No.	Games	G	B	K	H	D	M	T	G	B	K	H	D	M	T
2020	Western Bulldogs	25	1	0	1	5	3	8	2	5	0.0	0.0	5.0	3.0	8.0	2.0	5.0
2021	Western Bulldogs	25	5	1	1	27	8	35	13	10	0.2	0.2	5.4	1.6	7.0	2.6	2.0
2022 (S6)	Western Bulldogs	25	9	7	1	39	30	69	14	25	0.8	0.1	4.3	3.3	7.7	1.6	2.8
2022 (S7)	Western Bulldogs	25	5	0	1	22	14	36	13	7	0.0	0.2	4.4	2.8	7.2	2.6	1.4
2023	Collingwood	17	10	8	6	49	26	75	22	21	0.8	0.6	4.9	2.6	7.5	2.2	2.1
2024	Collingwood	17	0	—	—	—	—	—	—	—	—	—	—	—	—	—	—
2025	Collingwood	17	8	4	3	19	16	35	8	16	0.5	0.4	2.4	2.0	4.4	1.0	2.0
Career			38	20	13	161	97	258	72	84	0.5	0.3	4.2	2.6	6.8	1.9	2.2
