= Sophie Van De Heuvel =

Australian rules footballer

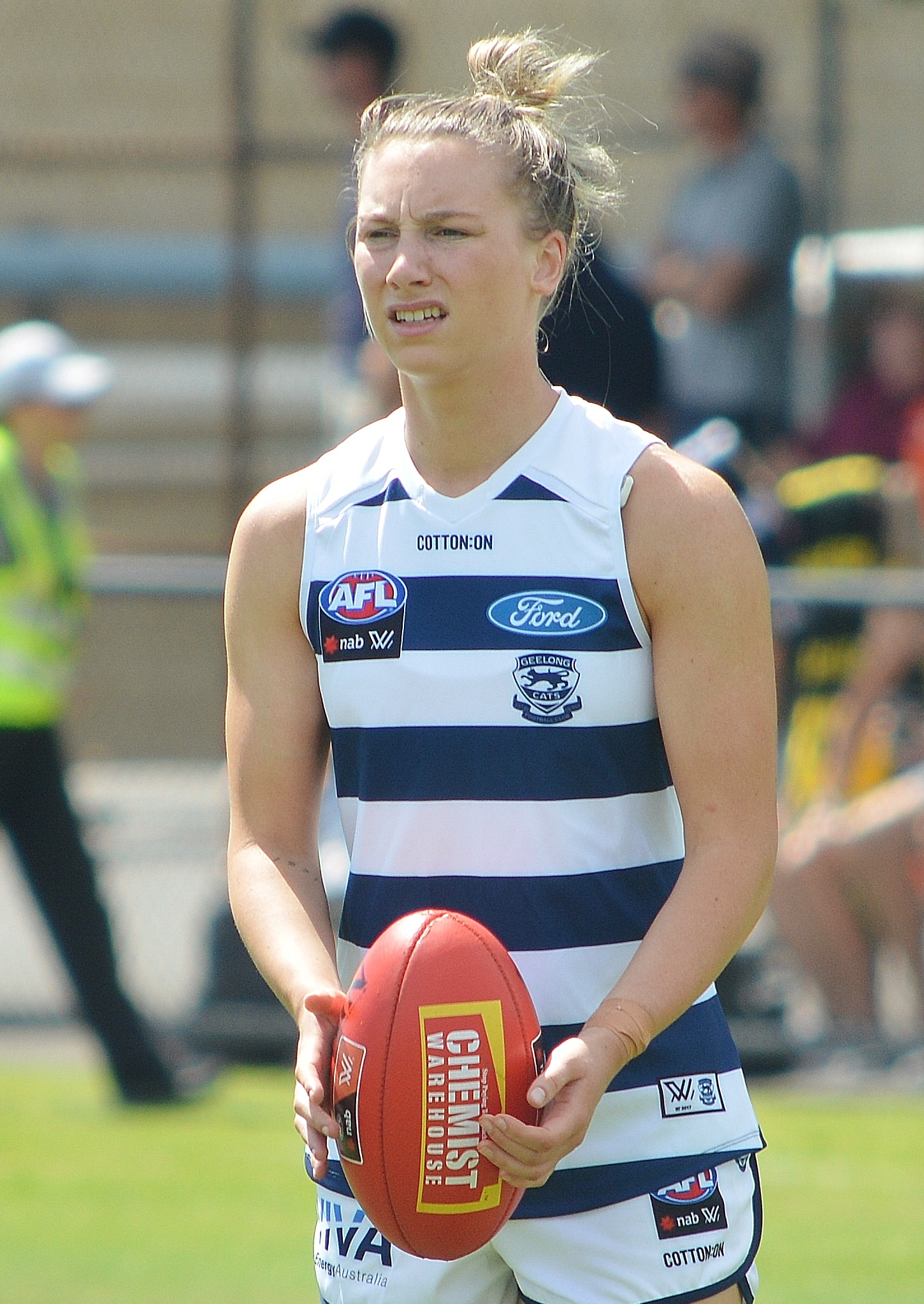
- Van De Heuvel with Geelong in February 2020

Personal information
- Born: 10 December 2000 (age 25)
- Original teams: Greater Western Victoria Rebels (TAC Cup Girls); Williamstown (VFLW)
- Draft: No. 2, 2018 national draft
- Debut: Round 1, 2019, Geelong vs. Collingwood, at GMHBA Stadium
- Height: 171 cm (5 ft 7 in)
- Position: Midfielder / forward

Club information
- Current club: Essendon
- Number: 27

Playing career^{1}
Years	Club	Games (Goals)
2019–2022	Geelong	31 (1)
S7 (2022)–	Essendon	20 (0)
Total		51 (1)
- ^{1} Playing statistics correct to the end of the 2023 season.

Sophie Van De Heuvel (born 10 December 2000) is an Australian rules footballer playing for the Essendon Football Club in the AFL Women's (AFLW). A cricketer as well as a footballer, she competed in both sports at the national level in her junior career. Van De Heuvel was the second selection in the 2018 AFL Women's draft and debuted in the opening round of the 2019 AFL Women's season.

== Early life ==
Van De Heuvel grew up in Ballarat and attended Loreto College. She came from a sporting family: her father Mark Van De Heuvel played football for Sebastopol and cricket for Golden Point, her mother Melinda Brown played netball and indoor cricket, and her brother played football and cricket. Van De Heuvel primarily focussed on football and cricket, but also played netball early in her junior career. She cited dual-sport athlete Jess Duffin as a role model she planned to emulate.

=== Cricket ===
In her junior career, Van De Heuvel was a right-arm fast bowler, described as an all-rounder. Van De Heuvel played junior cricket for Golden Point. She attended the Under-15 Girls National Championships in 2015 and was named the third-best player of the series. In 2016, Van De Heuvel began to play for Plenty Valley Cricket Club in Victoria Premier Cricket and won the competition's best first-year player award. The same year, she played for the Cricket Australia XI in the National Under 18 Championships, when she was aged 15. In the second match, Van De Heuvel scored a half century. Ahead of the 2018 AFLW draft, she played for Essendon Maribyrnong Park Ladies Club and hoped to continue her cricket in the Women's Big Bash League. She played for Victoria Country at the 2019 National Under 18 Championships and suffered a minor hamstring injury.

=== Football ===
Van De Heuvel played football through the Auskick program and began her junior career with Ballarat Football Club. She focussed on netball until she played in the under-14 boys football competition. Van De Heuvel progressed to the TAC Cup Girls, where she played for the Greater Western Victoria Rebels, tying for their best and fairest with Ella Bibby in 2017. She represented Vic Country at the 2018 AFL Women's Under 18 Championships and was named in the All-Australian side. Van De Heuvel was also named in the TAC Cup Girls team of the year and played five VFL Women's matches for Williamstown Football Club. At the AFLW draft combine, she won the left-side running vertical jump with a leap of 70 centimetres. Ahead of the 2018 AFLW draft, Van De Heuvel was predicted to be taken with one of Geelong's first selections.

== AFLW career ==
Van De Heuvel was drafted by Geelong with the second selection in the 2018 AFL Women's draft. She received the guernsey number 27, a tribute to her father's footballing career with Sebastopol wearing 27. Van De Heuvel made her debut in the opening round of the 2019 AFL Women's season against Collingwood.

In May 2022, Van De Heuvel joined expansion club Essendon.

== Personal life ==
Van De Heuvel was in a relationship with Australian influencer Sophie Cachia in 2023.

== Statistics ==
Statistics are correct to the end of the 2019 season.

Legend
G	Goals	K	Kicks	D	Disposals	T	Tackles
B	Behinds	H	Handballs	M	Marks

Season	Team	No.	Games	Totals							Averages (per game)							Votes
Season	Team	No.	Games	G	B	K	H	D	M	T	G	B	K	H	D	M	T	Votes
2019	Geelong	27	7	1	0	25	18	43	7	14	0.1	0.0	3.6	2.6	6.1	1.0	2.0	0
Career			7	1	0	25	18	43	7	14	0.1	0.0	3.6	2.6	6.1	1.0	2.0	0
