= Daisy Bateman =

Australian rules footballer

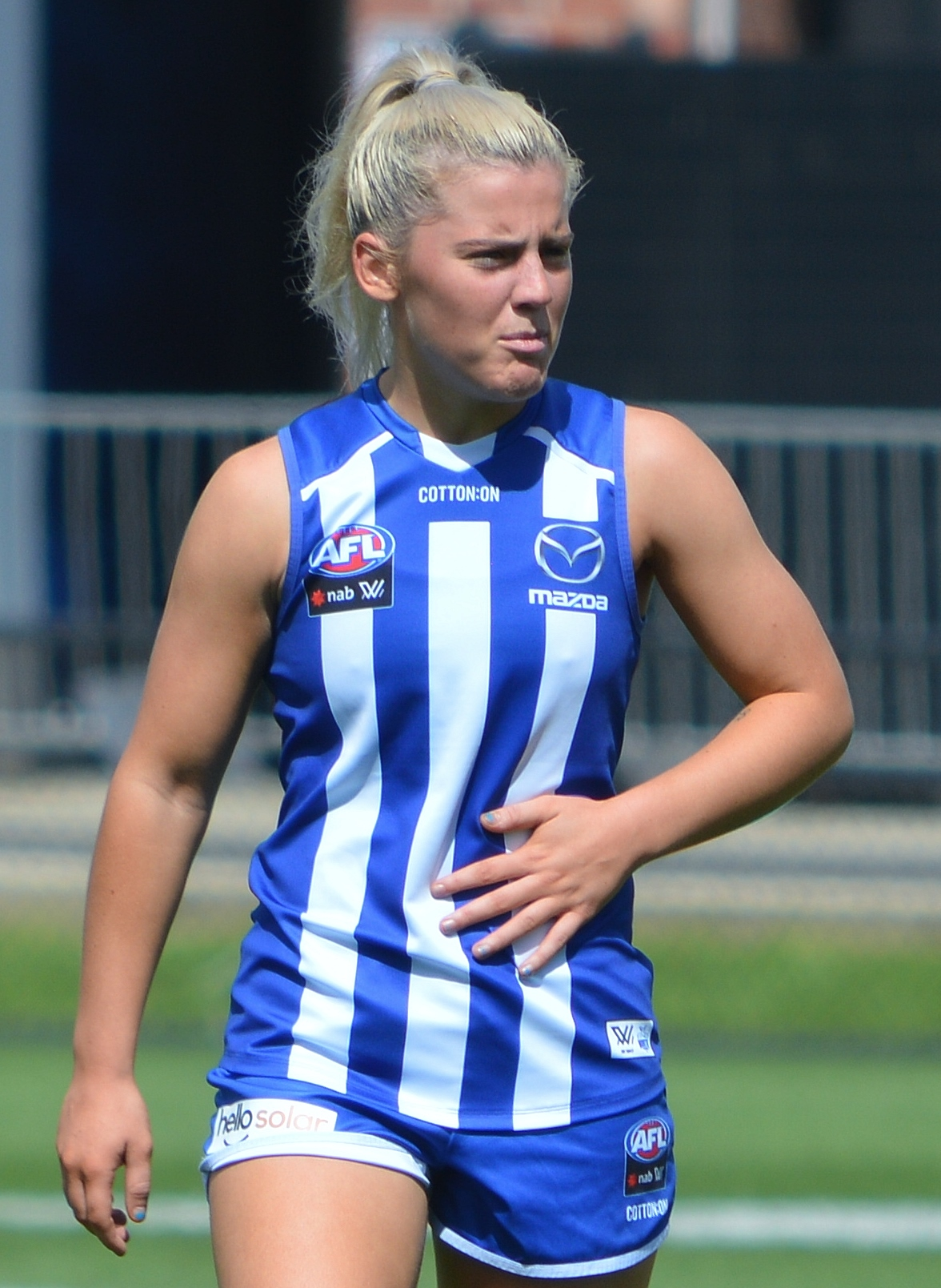
- Bateman with North Melbourne in March 2021

Personal information
- Born: 20 February 2000 (age 26)
- Original team: Oakleigh Chargers (TAC Cup)
- Draft: No. 25, 2018 national draft
- Debut: Round 1, 2019, North Melbourne vs. Carlton, at North Hobart Oval
- Height: 166 cm (5 ft 5 in)
- Position: Midfield

Playing career^{1}
Years	Club	Games (Goals)
2019–2022	North Melbourne	34 (22)
S7 (2022)–2023	Western Bulldogs	14 (3)
Total		48 (25)
- ^{1} Playing statistics correct to the end of the 2023 season.

Career highlights
- Junior: TAC Cup Girls Team of the Year: 2018; U18 All-Australian: 2018.

Daisy Bateman (born 20 February 2000) is an Australian musician, singer-songwriter and former Australian rules footballer who last played for the Western Bulldogs in the AFL Women's competition (AFLW).

She previously played for North Melbourne.

== Australian rules football career ==
=== Early career ===
As a teen, Bateman was originally a junior basketball player, but focused on Australian football during the first season of the AFL Women's competition in 2017. Prior to her draft year, Bateman played with Collingwood in the VFL Women's competition and with the Oakleigh Chargers in the TAC Cup Girls competition. She earned selection in the TAC Cup Girls Team of the Year and was named All-Australian for her performances at the 2018 AFL Women's Under 18 Championships. It was revealed she signed on with the club for one more season on 17 June 2021, tying her to the club until the end of 2022.

=== AFLW career ===
Bateman was drafted by North Melbourne with the club's first selection and the 25th pick overall in the 2018 AFL Women's draft. She made her debut in the club's inaugural match, a 36-point victory over Carlton at North Hobart Oval in the opening round of the 2019 season. Across the first three seasons with North Melbourne she played every match with the club, but was omitted before the club's round 8 match against Melbourne.

In June 2022, Bateman was traded to Western Bulldogs.

While at the Western Bulldogs, Bateman struggled with the team languishing down the bottom of the ladder. She was delisted by the Bulldogs at the end of the 2023 season.

== Music career – Daezy ==
Following the 2020 AFL Women's season Bateman taught herself to play piano and started writing songs. Bateman eventually formed the four-piece indie-pop-rock band Daezy with Jackson Raeburn, Josh Michael's,Jack bailey and Sam Gilfedder. The group started performing in February 2024. The band released their debut single "Forever" on 12 October 2024 and an EP titled See Me Standing in April 2025.

See Me Standing has been described as "emotional storytelling through sound," with the Bateman's voice described as "gritty and raspy," but also "crystalline and angelic."

== Personal life ==
She grew up in Melbourne's eastern suburbs and attended Methodist Ladies' College, Melbourne.
