= Sophie Molan =

Australian rules footballer (born 2001)

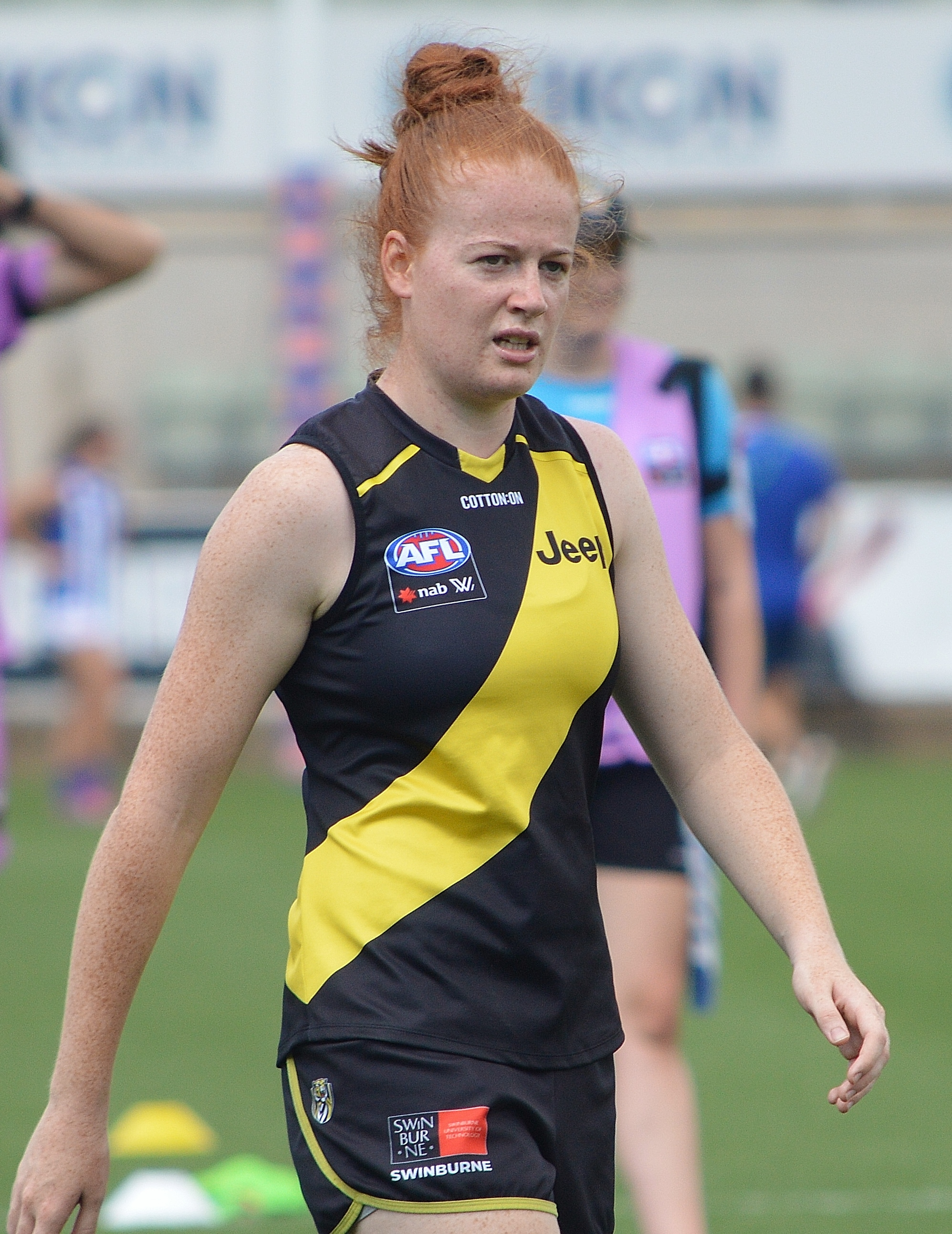
- Molan with Richmond in February 2020

Personal information
- Born: 24 March 2001 (age 25)
- Original team: GWV Rebels (NAB League Girls)
- Draft: No. 7, 2019 AFLW draft
- Debut: Round 1, 2020, Richmond vs. Carlton, at Ikon Park
- Height: 175 cm (5 ft 9 in)
- Position: Midfielder

Playing career^{1}
Years	Club	Games (Goals)
2020–2022 (S7)	Richmond	24 (1)
- ^{1} Playing statistics correct to the end of 2022 season 7.

Career highlights
- AFLW: Inaugural Richmond AFLW team: 2020; Junior: Under-18 All-Australian: 2019; NAB League Girls Team of the Year: 2019; GWV Rebels captain: 2019

Sophie Molan (born 24 March 2001) is an Australian rules footballer who played for the Richmond Football Club in the AFL Women's (AFLW) competition.

== Early life, junior and state-league football ==
Molan grew up in the Victorian country town of Ballarat. She played junior football with boys teams at the Mount Clear Football Club, before switching to the Lake Wendouree Football Club in later years. During her junior years she was also a talented basketball player, who represented the Victorian Country state team at under 16 level in 2016.

Molan attended high school at Ballarat's Loreto College where she was best on ground in a Herald Sun Shield Intermediate premiership victory in 2017.

Molan played representative football at NAB League level with the Greater Western Victoria Rebels, and captained the side in her draft year in 2019. That year, she was named to the competition's Team of the Year.

At the 2019 AFL Women's Under 18 Championships, Molan was a standout performer for the Victorian Country side, averaging 16 disposals a game and earning selection to the All-Australian side.

She made her debut at VFL Women's level that same year, playing a total of six matches with the Rebels-aligned Western Bulldogs including a losing grand final.

== AFL Women's career ==
Molan was drafted by Richmond with the club's first pick and the seventh selection overall in the 2019 AFL Women's draft.

Molan made her debut in the club's inaugural match, a round 1 home game against Carlton at Ikon Park.

In March 2023, Molan was delisted by Richmond.

== Player profile ==
Molan plays as a tall ball-winning inside midfielder and is adept at handballing clear of stoppage situations.

== Statistics ==
Legend
G	Goals	K	Kicks	D	Disposals	T	Tackles
B	Behinds	H	Handballs	M	Marks

Season	Team	No.	Games	Totals							Averages (per game)						
Season	Team	No.	Games	G	B	K	H	D	M	T	G	B	K	H	D	M	T
2020	Richmond	1	6	0	0	16	31	47	6	16	0.0	0.0	2.7	5.2	7.8	1.0	2.7
2021	Richmond	1	9	0	0	35	43	78	8	25	0.0	0.0	3.9	4.8	8.7	0.9	2.8
2022 (S6)	Richmond	1	5	1	1	15	17	32	7	13	0.2	0.2	3.0	3.4	6.4	1.4	2.6
2022 (S7)	Richmond	1	4	0	0	4	17	21	1	6	0.0	0.0	1.0	4.3	5.3	0.3	1.5
Career			24	1	1	70	108	178	22	60	0.0	0.0	2.9	4.5	7.4	0.9	2.5
