= Keeley Sherar =

Australian rules footballer

Personal information
- Full name: Keeley Sherar
- Born: 29 October 2003 (age 23)
- Original team: Eastern Ranges (NAB League Girls)
- Draft: No. 11, 2021 national draft
- Debut: Round 3, 2022 (S6), Carlton vs. Brisbane, at Metricon Stadium
- Height: 170 cm (5 ft 7 in)
- Position: Midfielder

Club information
- Current club: Carlton
- Number: 25

Playing career^{1}
Years	Club	Games (Goals)
2022 (S6)–	Carlton	50 (12)
- ^{1} Playing statistics correct to the end of the 2025 season.

Career highlights
- AFL Women's Rising Star nominee: 2022 (S6); Carlton best and fairest: 2024

Keeley Sherar is an Australian rules footballer playing for the Carlton Football Club in the AFL Women's (AFLW). Sherar was recruited by Carlton with the 11th pick in the 2021 AFL Women's draft.

== AFL Women's career ==
Sherar debuted for the Blues in the third round of 2022 AFL Women's season 6. On debut, she collected 5 disposals. The following round, she earned herself a rising star nomination after collecting 19 disposals and 4 score involvements against North Melbourne, her performance also earning her coaches votes. After suffering a broken hand, she missed the next two matches to return in round 7.

=== Statistics ===
Updated to the end of 2022 (S7).

Legend
G	Goals	K	Kicks	D	Disposals	T	Tackles
B	Behinds	H	Handballs	M	Marks

Season	Team	No.	Games	Totals							Averages (per game)							Votes
Season	Team	No.	Games	G	B	K	H	D	M	T	G	B	K	H	D	M	T	Votes
2022 (S6)	Carlton	25	6	2	1	43	24	67	12	21	0.3	0.2	7.2	4.0	11.2	2.0	3.5	0
2022 (S7)	Carlton	25	10	0	0	56	46	102	15	40	0.0	0.0	5.6	4.6	10.2	1.5	4.0	
Career			GA	2	1	99	70	169	27	61	0.1	0.1	6.2	4.4	10.6	1.7	3.8	0

== Honours and achievements ==
- AFL Women's Rising Star nominee: 2022 (S6)
