= Lily Johnson =

Australian rules footballer

Personal information
- Born: 13 April 2004 (age 22)
- Original teams: Devonport (NWFL), West Adelaide (SANFLW)
- Draft: No. 80, 2022 national draft
- Debut: 15 October 2022 vs. North Melbourne, at Alberton Oval
- Height: 167 cm (5 ft 6 in)

Playing career^{1}
Years	Club	Games (Goals)
2022B–2023	Port Adelaide	5 (2)
2024–2025	Melbourne	14 (1)
2026–	Fremantle	6 (0)
Total		25 (3)
- ^{1} Playing statistics correct to the end of the 2026 season.

Lily Johnson (born 13 April 2004) is an Australian rules footballer who plays for the Fremantle Football Club in the AFL Women's (AFLW) competition. Originally from Devonport, Tasmania, Johnson moved to play for West Adelaide in the SANFLW before being selected by Port Adelaide with pick 80 in the 2022 AFLW draft.

Johnson made her AFLW debut for Port Adelaide in 2022, playing in the club's inaugural AFLW season. She was then traded to Melbourne for the 2024 season, where she played five matches in her first year at the club. She was traded from Melbourne to Fremantle ahead of the 2026 AFLW season.

== Early life and state football ==
Johnson was raised in Tasmania and played junior football for Devonport. She represented Tasmania at under-15 level before moving to South Australia to play for West Adelaide in the SANFLW with her brother Jesse.

== AFLW career ==
=== Port Adelaide ===
Johnson was selected by Port Adelaide with the club's seventh and final selection, pick 80 overall, in the 2022 AFLW draft. She made her AFLW debut in round 8 of the 2022 season against North Melbourne at Alberton Oval during the league's Pride Round. She kicked a goal on debut and retained her place in the side for the remaining three games of the season.

Johnson played five matches for Port Adelaide across the 2022 and 2023 seasons, kicking two goals.

=== Melbourne ===
At the conclusion of the 2023 season, Johnson was traded to Melbourne as part of a huge 11-club mega trade. She made her debut for the club in round 5 of the 2024 AFLW season and played five matches during the season.

Johnson played a further nine matches for Melbourne in 2025, finishing her two-season stint at the club with 14 AFLW appearances.

=== Fremantle ===
Johnson was traded from Melbourne to Fremantle during the 2025–26 AFLW player movement period, alongside forward Eden Zanker. Her partner, Judd McVee was also traded to Fremantle's men's team over the same off-season. She made her debut for Fremantle in the opening round of the 2026 AFL Women's season.
