= 2019 AFL Women's Under-18 Championships =

AFL Women's Under-18 Championships
- 2019

Tournament information
- Sport: Australian rules football
- Dates: 31 May–12 July
- Tournament format(s): Round-robin
- Venue(s): Avalaon Airport Oval; Blacktown International Sportspark; Bond University; Karen Rolton Oval; Metricon Stadium; Peter Motley Oval; Southport; Subiaco Oval
- Teams: 8 (series 1); 6 (series 2)

Final positions
- Champions: Vic Metro (de facto)

Tournament statistics
- Matches played: 16
- MVP: Georgia Patrikios (Vic Metro)

The 2019 NAB AFL Women's Under-18 Championships was played between May and July 2019, with six teams competing in the main 'Series 2' round-robin tournament and with a further four playing in a two-match one-on-one exhibition as the competition's initial 'Series 1' tournament.

== Format ==
The competition was opened with "Series 1", a set of closed competitions between four pairs of teams representing the country's eight largest states and territories. In "Series 2", teams representing Vic Country, Vic Metro, Queensland and Western Australia were joined by Central and Eastern Allies teams representing teams of the combined regions of Northern Territory and South Australia (Central) as well as New South Wales, ACT and Tasmania (Eastern). Each team played a total of three matches in that series.

Vic Metro finished the round-robin 'Series 2' as the only team undefeated in that series, making them the de facto tournament winners. The competition's best player award was won by Vic Metro's Georgia Patrikios.

== Fixture ==
=== Series 1 ===
	South Australian vs. Northern Territory
Friday, 31 May	South Australia 13.5 (83)	def.	Northern Territory 4.1 (25)	Peter Motley Oval	Results
Sunday, 2 June	South Australia 10.11 (71)	def.	Northern Territory 0.2 (2)	Karen Rolton Oval	Results

	NSW/ACT vs. Tasmania
Friday, 31 May	NSW/ACT 11.5 (71)	def.	Tasmania 2.1 (13)	Blacktown International Sportspark	Results
Sunday, 2 June	NSW/ACT 13.6 (84)	def.	Tasmania 2.4 (16)	Blacktown International Sportspark	Results

	Western Australia vs. Queensland
Friday, 14 June	Western Australia 7.8 (50)	def.	Queensland 0.3 (3)	Subiaco Oval	Results
Sunday, 16 June	Western Australia 4.4 (28)	def.	Queensland 2.1 (13)	Subiaco Oval	Results

	Vic Country vs. Vic Metro
Saturday, 22 June	Vic Country 4.2 (26)	def. by	Vic Metro 10.10 (70)	Avalaon Airport Oval	Results

=== Series 2 ===
	Round 1
Monday, 8 July	Queensland 3.1 (19)	def. by	Vic Country 9.7 (61)	Metricon Stadium	Results
Monday, 8 July	Vic Metro 8.3 (51)	def.	Western Australia 5.4 (34)	Metricon Stadium	Results
Monday, 8 July	Eastern Allies 4.8 (32)	def. by	Central Allies 5.6 (36)	Metricon Stadium	Results

	Round 2
Wednesday, 10 July	Queensland 1.5 (11)	def. by	Vic Metro 4.5 (29)	Southport	Results
Wednesday, 10 July	Vic Country 6.6 (42)	def.	Eastern Allies 2.0 (12)	Southport	Results
Wednesday, 10 July	Western Australia 5.2 (32)	def.	Central Allies 1.4 (10)	Southport	Results

	Round 3
Friday, 12 July	Eastern Allies 0.3 (3)	def. by	Vic Metro 11.0 (75)	Bond University	Results
Friday, 12 July	Vic Country 3.7 (25)	def.	Western Australia 3.5 (23)	Bond University	Results
Friday, 12 July	Queensland 4.5 (29)	def. by	Central Allies 5.0 (30)	Bond University	Results

== All-Australian team ==
The 2019 Women's All-Australian team was selected by a panel of experts, including the AFL's Brett Munro and AFL Women's club list managers Katrina Gill (Adelaide), Wade Spilcker (Fremantle), Rhys Harwood (North Melbourne), and Ben Waller (Geelong).

2019 Under 18 Women's All-Australian team
B:	Brenna Tarrant (NSW/ACT)	Millie Brown (VC)	Kitara Whap-Farrar (Qld)
HB:	Tyanna Smith (VC)	Serene Watson (Qld)	Ellie Hampson (Qld)
C:	Molly McDonald (VC)	Lucy McEvoy (VC) (capt.)	Georgia Patrikios (VM)
HF:	Teah Charlton (SA)	Roxy Roux (WA)	Ellie McKenzie (VM)
F:	Mia King (Tas)	Olivia Barber (VC)	Gabby Newton (VM)
Foll:	Montana McKinnon (SA)	Sophie Molan (VC)	Mikayla Bowen (WA)
Int:	Mim Strom (WA)	Madison Newman (SA)	Laura McClelland (VM)
Int:	Lily Postlethwaite (Qld)		
Coach:	Not named		

== Team MVPs ==
At the conclusion of the tournament, each competing team named their best player for the tournament. The winner of these 'most valuable player' awards are as follows:

Team	Player
Central Allies	Montana McKinnon (SA)
Eastern Allies	Mia King (Tas)
Queensland	Ellie Hampson
Vic Metro	Georgia Patrikios
Vic Country	Lucy McEvoy
Western Australia	Mikayla Bowen
