= Serene Watson =

Australian rules footballer

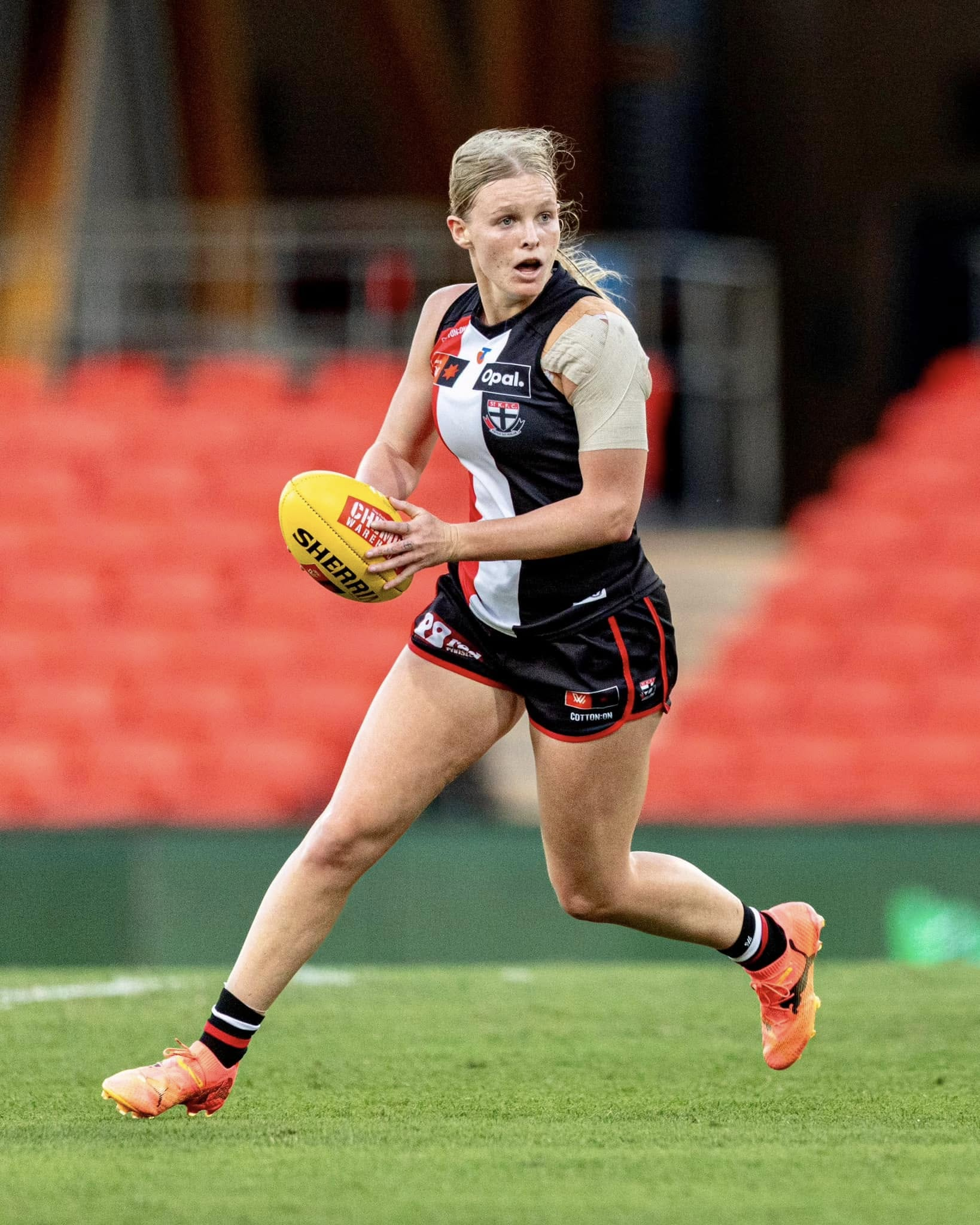

Personal information
- Full name: Serene Indigo Watson
- Born: 3 November 2001 (age 25); Sydney, New South Wales
- Original team: Bond University (QAFLW)
- Draft: No. 18, 2019 AFL Women's draft
- Height: 174 cm (5 ft 9 in)
- Position: Half-back

Club information
- Current club: St Kilda

Playing career^{1}
Years	Club	Games (Goals)
2020–S7 (2022)	Gold Coast	33 (0)
2023–	St Kilda	9 (0)
Total		42 (0)
- ^{1} Playing statistics correct to the end of the 2023 season.

Serene Indigo Watson (born 3 November 2001) is an Australian rules footballer playing for St Kilda in the AFL Women's competition (AFLW). She has previously played for the Gold Coast.

== Early life ==
Watson was born in Sydney, New South Wales and moved to the Gold Coast at eight years of age. She attended Helensvale State High School throughout her upbringing and began playing junior football with the Broadbeach Cats. She later switched to play for the Bond University and became a dual All-Australian at the under-18 level in 2018 and 2019. Watson signed with the Gold Coast Suns Academy.

== AFLW career ==
Watson became the first women's player ever drafted by the Gold Coast Suns when she was selected with the 18th pick in the 2019 AFL Women's draft. She made her AFLW debut against Greater Western Sydney in round 1 of the 2020 AFL Women's season.

At the end of 2022 season 7, Watson was traded to St Kilda as part of a five-club deal.

== Personal life ==
Early in their careers, Prespakis dated then-Carlton player Maddy Prespakis.

== Statistics ==
Statistics are correct to the end of the 2020 season.

Legend
G	Goals	K	Kicks	D	Disposals	T	Tackles
B	Behinds	H	Handballs	M	Marks

Season	Team	No.	Games	Totals							Averages (per game)							Votes
Season	Team	No.	Games	G	B	K	H	D	M	T	G	B	K	H	D	M	T	Votes
2020	Gold Coast	14	7	0	0	49	16	65	6	16	0.0	0.0	7.0	2.3	9.3	0.9	2.3	
Career			7	0	0	49	16	65	6	16	0.0	0.0	7.0	2.3	9.3	0.9	2.3	
