= Mikayla Bowen =

Australian rules footballer (born 2001)

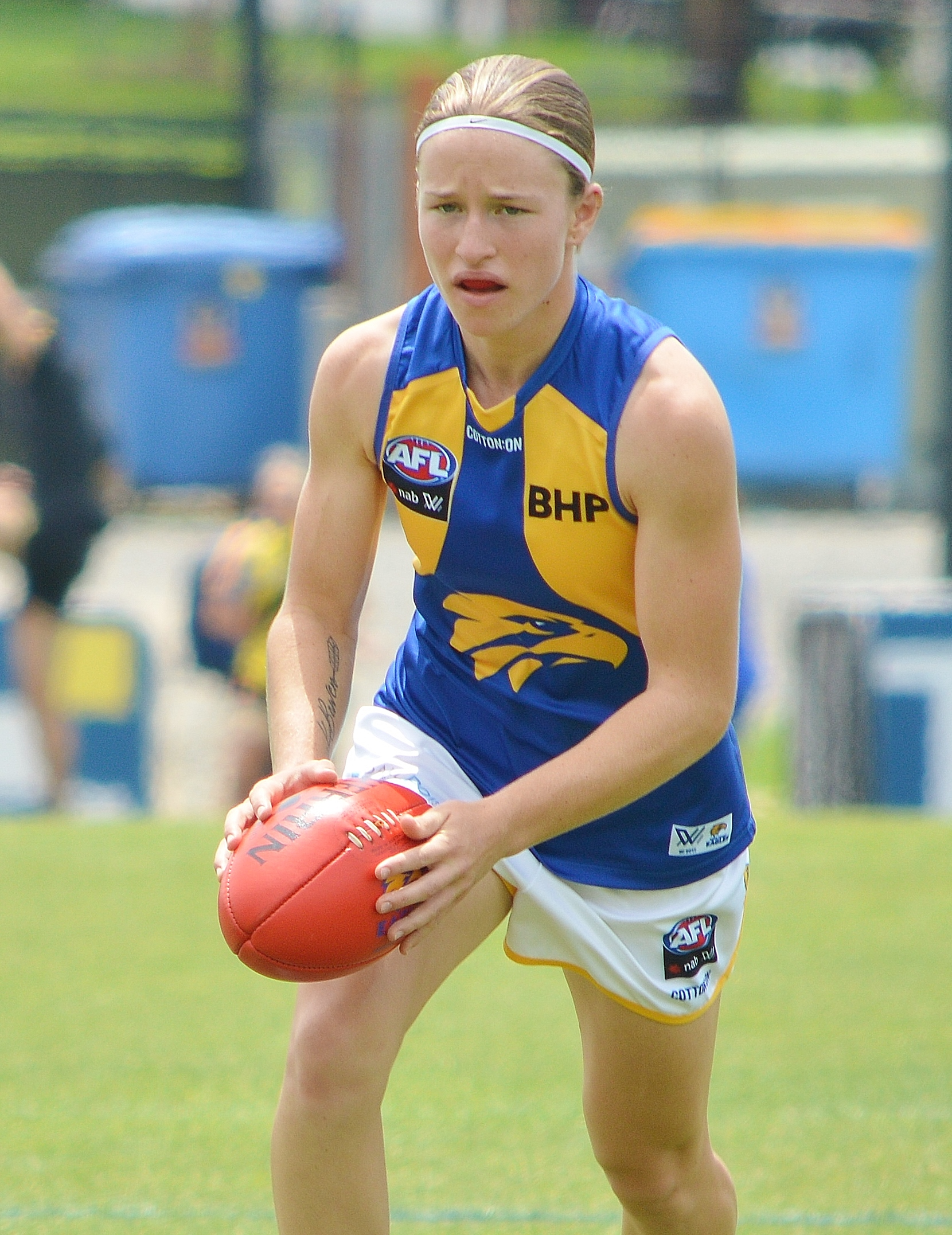
- Bowen with West Coast in 2020

Personal information
- Born: 17 April 2001 (age 25)
- Original team: Swan Districts (WAFLW)
- Draft: Expansion signing, 2019
- Debut: Round 1, 2019, West Coast vs. Collingwood, at Victoria Park
- Height: 164 cm (5 ft 5 in)
- Position: Wing
- Other occupation: diversity and inclusion co-ordinator

Club information
- Current club: Geelong
- Number: 1

Playing career^{1}
Years	Club	Games (Goals)
2020–2022 (S6)	West Coast	25 (8)
2022 (S7)–	Geelong	24 (2)
Total		49 (10)
- ^{1} Playing statistics correct to the end of the 2023 season.

Mikayla Bowen (born 17 April 2001) is an Australian rules footballer playing for Geelong in the AFL Women's (AFLW). She previously played for the West Coast Eagles. Bowen and Rosie Deegan were West Coast's first two signings prior to its debut in the 2020 AFLW season. Bowen played in the club's first match, against Collingwood.

== Junior career ==
From Darlington, Perth, Western Australia, Bowen tried athletics, basketball and soccer in her youth before settling on football around 2016, playing recreationally at her school, Helena College. She also played for Swan Districts, a WAFL Women's (WAFLW) club, in their junior side, winning a best and fairest in 2016 and captaining the team to a premiership in 2017. Bowen also represented her state at the AFL Women's Under 18 Championships from 2017 to 2019. At her final championships, she captained Western Australia. She was named in the All-Australian side's midfield and her state's best and fairest after averaging about 19 disposals, four tackles and seven clearances.

== AFLW career ==
=== West Coast ===
==== 2019–2020: Early career ====
After training in West Coast's women's academy, Bowen signed with the club in January 2019. As an expansion club entering the AFLW in 2020, West Coast were permitted to sign up to 10 players from their academy before the end of the 2019 season; Bowen and Deegan were the first announced.

Bowen debuted in the opening round of the 2020 season, as part of West Coast's inaugural team. She recorded eight disposals on debut as she was named on the wing and showed enormous pressure with ten tackles but it was not enough to get her team their first win in their first game. West Coast failed to win their first three games of the season before recording their first win against the Western Bulldogs by four points, it was also her sides only win for the 2020 AFL Women's season.

Bowen's round three match against the GWS Giants was her best game in her first season in the AFL Women's competition where she recorded 14 disposals, 3 tackles and her first goal in her career.

The West Coast Eagles failed to make finals and finished on the bottom of the conference B ladder at the conclusion of the 2020 season.

==== 2021–2022 (S6): Improvement and departure from West Coast ====
Bowen showed clear improvement in her second season in the competition recording five more goals including a career-high two goals against the Richmond Tigers in round seven and career-high disposal count in round nine against St Kilda with 22 disposals beating her previous records of 21 disposals from round five and eight.

Bowen won a 2021 AFL Women's Rising Star nomination for her role in West Coast's first win of the season, against Gold Coast by a point. She collected 21 disposals, 7 marks and a goal.

West Coast recorded just one more win for the season and again failed to make finals at the conclusion of the 2021 AFL Women's season and finished twelfth with a two win and seven loss record with a percentage of 53.

Bowen again played every match in 2022 season 6 and continued to play a key role on the wing for her side but she recorded just one win in the fourth round against St Kilda by two points.

West Coast were the wooden spoon team in the sixth season of the AFL Women's competition, as they finished last on the ladder with a record of one win and nine loss record with a percentage of just 42.9.

=== Geelong ===
==== 2022–present: New start ====
In June 2022, Bowen requested a trade away from West Coast and was traded to Geelong for pick 24. She made her club debut against the Richmond Tigers in the opening round of the seventh season of the AFL Women's competition and instantly cemented her spot as a starting winger for her new club with 16 disposals in a win.

Bowen has played every possible match in her four seasons in the AFL Women's competition.

== Statistics ==
Statistics are correct to the end of the 2023 AFL Women's season.

Legend
G	Goals	K	Kicks	D	Disposals	T	Tackles
B	Behinds	H	Handballs	M	Marks

Season	Team	No.	Games	Totals							Averages (per game)							Votes
Season	Team	No.	Games	G	B	K	H	D	M	T	G	B	K	H	D	M	T	Votes
2020	West Coast	1	6	1	1	34	28	62	5	31	0.2	0.2	5.7	4.7	10.3	0.8	5.2	0
2021	West Coast	1	9	5	1	84	65	149	35	26	0.6	0.1	9.3	7.2	16.6	3.9	2.9	5
2022 (S6)	West Coast	1	10	2	0	83	43	126	24	58	0.2	0.0	8.3	4.3	12.6	2.4	5.8	0
2022 (S7)	Geelong	1	11	0	2	83	75	158	30	26	0.0	0.2	7.5	6.8	14.4	2.7	2.4	0
2023	Geelong	1	13	2	1	92	71	163	35	56	0.2	0.1	7.1	5.5	12.5	2.7	4.3	0
Career			49	10	5	376	282	658	129	197	0.2	0.1	7.7	5.8	13.4	2.6	4.0	5

== Personal life ==
Bowen's family has strong connections to ballet and football. Her grandmother Terri Charlesworth was West Australian Ballet's first ballerina, while her mother took the same role at Les Ballets de Monte-Carlo. Bowen's uncle played for Swan Districts in the late 1980s, while her great-great-grandfather played for South Melbourne.

She has been a "diehard" supporter of West Coast since her childhood.
