= Eleri Morris =

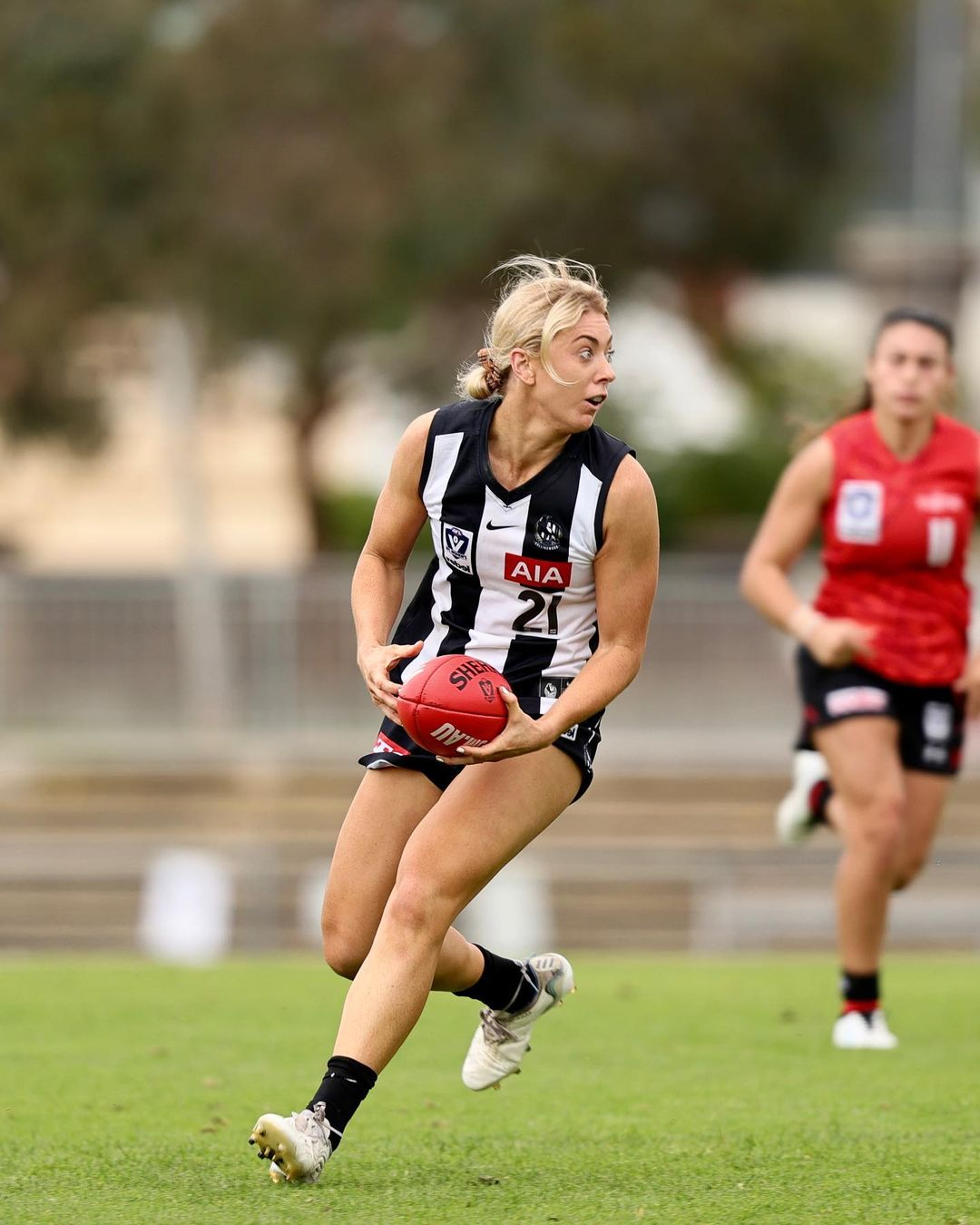

Personal information
- Born: 12 November 1996 (age 29)
- Original team: Collingwood (VFLW)
- Draft: Pick 13, 2023 AFL Women's supplementary draft
- Debut: Round 1, 2023, Collingwood vs. Melbourne, at IKON Park
- Height: 177 cm (5 ft 10 in)
- Position: Forward

Playing career^{1}
Years	Club	Games (Goals)
2023–2024	Collingwood	17 (7)
- ^{1} Playing statistics correct to the end of the 2024 season.

Eleri Morris (born 12 November 1996) is an Australian rules footballer who played for Collingwood in the AFL Women's. Morris was picked by Collingwood with pick 13 in the 2023 AFL Women's supplementary draft.

== Football career ==
Prior to joining the AFLW, Morris played her football at Wollongong Saints and Collingwood VFLW. She kicked 4 goals from her 4 games at VFL Women's level.

Morris debuted in Round 1 of the 2023 AFL Women's season. She collected six disposals. She has played every game so far this season, kicking three goals.

After two seasons at the club, Morris was delisted by Collingwood in December 2024.

== Personal life ==
Morris is a Lieutenant and Marine Engineer in the Australian Navy.

== Statistics ==
Updated to the end of the 2024 season.

Legend
G	Goals	K	Kicks	D	Disposals	T	Tackles
B	Behinds	H	Handballs	M	Marks

Season	Team	No.	Games	Totals							Averages (per game)						
Season	Team	No.	Games	G	B	K	H	D	M	T	G	B	K	H	D	M	T
2023	Collingwood	21	10	6	3	29	20	49	13	14	0.6	0.3	2.9	2.0	4.9	1.3	1.4
2024	Collingwood	21	7	1	0	25	7	32	12	7	0.1	0.0	3.6	1.0	4.6	1.7	1.0
Career			17	7	3	54	27	81	25	21	0.4	0.2	3.2	1.6	4.8	1.5	1.2
