= Katelyn Pope =

Australian cricketer (born 1996)

Personal information
- Full name: Katelyn Pope
- Born: 29 March 1996 (age 30)
- Height: 161 cm (5 ft 3 in)
- Batting: Right-handed
- Bowling: Left-arm medium fast
- Role: Bowler

Domestic team information
- Years: Team
- 2014–2019: South Australian Scorpions
- 2016–2019: Adelaide Strikers (squad no. 18)
- Source: Cricket.com.au, 19 March 2017

Katelyn Pope
- Pope in 2026

Personal information
- Original team: North Adelaide (SANFLW)
- Draft: No. 12, 2023 AFL Women's supplementary draft
- Debut: Round 2, 2021, West Coast vs. Fremantle, at Fremantle Oval
- Position: Midfielder/forward

Club information
- Current club: Port Adelaide
- Number: 44

Playing career^{1}
Years	Club	Games (Goals)
2021	West Coast	6 (1)
2023–	Port Adelaide	31 (8)
Total		37 (9)
- ^{1} Playing statistics correct to the end of the 2025 season.

Katelyn Pope (born 29 March 1996) is an Australian cricketer and Australian rules footballer. She played cricket as a left arm swing bowler for South Australian Scorpions and Adelaide Strikers and plays football for Port Adelaide.

== Cricket ==
Pope made her debut for the Scorpions in round three of the 2014–15 season against the ACT Meteors. She played a total of 11 matches that season. The following season, 2015–16, she was a member of the title winning Scorpions team in the WNCL Grand Final. In December 2015, she was recruited by Wellington to compete in the New Zealand Women's Under 21 Tournament.

Pope was added to the Strikers' squad for its WBBL|02 campaign (2016–17). She has been described by the Strikers as being renowned for her consistent line and length bowling.

She was part of the Adelaide Strikers' squad for the 2018–19 Women's Big Bash League season.

Despite sharing a surname and also having red hair, she is not related to fellow South Australian cricketer Lloyd Pope.

== Australian rules football ==
Pope switched to play Australian rules football for North Adelaide Football Club in the SANFL Women's League. In 2021, she was selected by the West Coast Eagles as an injury replacement player for Mhicca Carter. She made her debut in the AFL Women's league in the second round of the 2021 AFL Women's season in the Western Derby. In June 2021, West Coast delisted her along with seven other players.

After missing the two 2022 AFLW seasons, Pope was selected by Port Adelaide with pick 12 in the 2023 AFL Women's supplementary draft.
