= Sarah Verrier =

Australian rules footballer

Personal information
- Born: 2 August 2002 (age 24)
- Original team: Peel Thunder (WAFLW)
- Draft: No. 14, 2020 AFL Women's draft
- Debut: Round 1, 2021, Fremantle vs. Greater Western Sydney, at Fremantle Oval
- Height: 166 cm (5 ft 5 in)

Club information
- Current club: Fremantle
- Number: 5

Playing career^{1}
Years	Club	Games (Goals)
2021–	Fremantle	74 (5)
- ^{1} Playing statistics correct to the end of the 2026 season.

Career highlights
- 2021 Fremantle AFLW Best First Year Player; 2022 AFL Women's season 6 Rising Star nomination: Rd 4

Sarah Verrier (born 2 August 2002) is an Australian rules footballer playing for the Fremantle Football Club in the AFL Women's (AFLW). Verrier was drafted by Fremantle with their first selection, 14th overall, in the 2020 AFL Women's draft after playing for Peel Thunder in the WAFL Women's (WAFLW).

She made her debut in the opening round of the 2021 AFL Women's season in Fremantle's win over Greater Western Sydney, and played in every game of the season. Verrier was awarded the team's best first year player award. She moved permanently to the backline in her second season, and was awarded the weekly rising star nomination in Round 4 after an impressive performance against Collingwood.

Verrier's brothers Steven and Brendan Verrier both play for South Fremantle in the West Australian Football Club. Steven was drafted by Richmond in the 2012 rookie draft, but never played an AFL game. Her sister, Haylee was a talented junior boxer. Her girlfriend is Madizen Wilkins, a WAFL Women's footballer with Subiaco and an injury replacement player for Fremantle in 2022 AFL Women's season 7.
