= Tahleah Mulder =

Personal information
- Born: 4 December 2001 (age 24)
- Original team: South Fremantle (WAFLW)
- Draft: Pick 3, 2023 AFL Women's supplementary draft
- Height: 170 cm (5 ft 7 in)
- Position: Midfielder

Club information
- Current club: Fremantle
- Number: 26

Playing career^{1}
Years	Club	Games (Goals)
2023–2024	Fremantle	4 (0)
- ^{1} Playing statistics correct to the end of the 2023 season.

Tahleah Mulder (born 4 December 2001) is an Australian rules footballer who played for the Fremantle Football Club in the AFL Women's.

Mulder played soccer as a child. She began playing Australian rules football in 2019. Mulder began her career playing in the Perth Football League for South Fremantle and Piara Waters. After four games in WAFL Women's, she nominated for the 2023 AFL Women's supplementary draft, where she was selected by Fremantle with the third pick.

Fremantle has said Mulder has a "raw talent that as tremendous upside". She made her AFLW debut in the loss to Geelong in round 7 of the 2023 AFL Women's season.
