= Dana East =

Australian rules footballer

Personal information
- Born: 10 June 2002 (age 24)
- Original team: Swan Districts (WAFLW)
- Draft: No. 31, 2021 AFL Women's draft
- Debut: Round 1, 2022 (S6), Fremantle vs. West Coast, at Fremantle Oval
- Height: 167 cm (5 ft 6 in)
- Position: Midfielder

Club information
- Current club: Richmond
- Number: 21

Playing career^{1}
Years	Club	Games (Goals)
2022 (S6)–2025	Fremantle	49 (8)
2026–	Richmond	2 (0)
Total		51 (8)
- ^{1} Playing statistics correct to the end of round 2, 2026.

Career highlights
- 2022 AFL Women's season 6 Rising Star nomination: Rd 9

Dana East (born 10 June 2002) is an Australian rules footballer playing for the Richmond Football Club in the AFL Women's (AFLW), having previously played for Fremantle. East was drafted by Fremantle with their second selection, and 31st overall in the 2021 AFL Women's draft.

East made her debut in the opening round of 2022 AFL Women's season 6. In her second game, she was praised for her efforts early in the game, and was awarded 5 votes in the AFL Coaches Association AFLW Champion Player of the Year award. She was nominated for the 2022 AFL Women's season 6 Rising Star award after performing well in round 9, when a depleted Fremantle side due to COVID-19 Health and Safety protocols, was beaten by a record margin by Melbourne. Following the 2025 AFL Women's season, East requested a trade from Fremantle, citing greater opportunity. She was traded on the last day of the trade period to Richmond.

A former basketballer from Manjimup, her father, Heath, also played football, for East Perth in the West Australian Football League.
