= Poppy Boltz =

Australian rules footballer

Personal information
- Full name: Poppy Rainbow Boltz
- Born: 25 September 2000 (age 26); Newcastle Upon Tyne
- Original team: Southport (QAFLW)
- Draft: No. 19, 2023 AFL Women's supplementary draft
- Debut: 9 September 2023, Brisbane vs. Port Adelaide, at Alberton Oval
- Height: 178 cm (5 ft 10 in)
- Position: Midfield

Club information
- Current club: Greater Western Sydney
- Number: 21

Playing career^{1}
| Years | Club | Games (Goals) |
| 2023–2025 | Brisbane | 28 (2) |
| 2026– | Greater Western Sydney | 0 (0) |
| Total | | 28 (2) |
- ^{1} Playing statistics correct to the end of the 2025 season.

Career highlights
- AFLW premiership player: 2023

Poppy Rainbow Boltz (born 25 September 2000) is an Australian rules footballer playing for Greater Western Sydney in the AFL Women's competition (AFLW). She previously played for Brisbane, winning the 2023 AFL Women's premiership with them.

== Early life ==
Boltz was born in northern England but raised in Cairns, Queensland. Boltz played junior football for Centrals Trinity Beach and Cairns Saints in the AFL Cairns women's competition before moving to the Gold Coast to further her career with the Gold Coast Suns Academy. A midfielder, she is known for her strong physical presence, ability to win the contested ball as well as run and carry. She was playing for Southport in the AFL Queensland Women's League when she was drafted by Brisbane with the 19th pick in the 2023 supplementary draft.

== AFLW career ==
Boltz debuted on 9 September 2023 for the Lions against the Port Adelaide Football Club women's team at Alberton Oval.

On 8 December 2025, following the conclusion of the 2025 AFL Women's season in which she only played three games, Boltz was traded to Greater Western Sydney.

== Statistics ==
Legend
| G | Goals | K | Kicks | D | Disposals | T | Tackles |
| B | Behinds | H | Handballs | M | Marks |
| # | Played in that season's premiership team |

| Season | Team | No. | Games | Totals | | | | | | | Averages (per game) | | | | | | | Votes |
| Season | Team | No. | Games | G | B | K | H | D | M | T | G | B | K | H | D | M | T | Votes |
|---|---|---|---|---|---|---|---|---|---|---|---|---|---|---|---|---|---|---|
| 2023^{#} | Brisbane | 15 | 11 | 0 | 0 | 44 | 30 | 74 | 9 | 26 | 0.0 | 0.0 | 4.0 | 2.7 | 6.7 | 0.8 | 2.4 | 0 |
| 2024 | Brisbane | 15 | 14 | 0 | 0 | 70 | 48 | 118 | 30 | 35 | 0.0 | 0.0 | 5.0 | 3.4 | 8.4 | 2.1 | 2.5 | 0 |
| 2025 | Brisbane | 15 | 3 | 2 | 1 | 16 | 4 | 20 | 2 | 3 | 0.7 | 0.3 | 5.3 | 1.3 | 6.7 | 0.7 | 1.0 | 0 |
| Career | | | 28 | 2 | 1 | 130 | 82 | 212 | 41 | 64 | 0.1 | 0.0 | 4.6 | 2.9 | 7.6 | 1.5 | 2.3 | 0 |
