= Mikayla Morrison =

Australian rules footballer

Personal information
- Born: 1 March 2002 (age 24)
- Original team: Swan Districts (WAFLW)
- Draft: No. 30, 2020 AFL Women's draft
- Debut: Round 4, 2022 (S6), Fremantle vs. Western Bulldogs, at Whitten Oval
- Height: 164 cm (5 ft 5 in)
- Position: Forward

Club information
- Current club: Fremantle
- Number: 11

Playing career^{1}
Years	Club	Games (Goals)
2022 (S6)–2024	Fremantle	7 (3)
- ^{1} Playing statistics correct to the end of the 2024 season.

Career highlights
- 2022 AFL Women's season 6 Rising Star nomination: Rd 6

Mikayla Morrison (born 1 March 2002) is an Australian rules footballer who played for the Fremantle Football Club in the AFL Women's (AFLW).

Morrison was drafted by Fremantle with their second selection, and 30th overall in the 2020 AFL Women's draft. As a junior she represented WA at the National Under 18s Championships in 2019, and was selected to be in the AFL Women's National Academy.

After not playing a game in her first season, she made her debut in the 4th round of 2022 AFL Women's season 6. In her third game, and first at home at Fremantle Oval, Morrison was one of Fremantle's best players, kicking 3 goals and receiving the weekly nomination for the AFL Women's Rising Star award. However, in her next game she suffered an anterior cruciate ligament injury to her left knee that would end her season. Upon returning to training the following year, she suffered the same injury to her right knee. In October 2024, 973 days after her previous game, Morrison returned to play for Fremantle.
