= Zimmorlei Farquharson =

Australian rules footballer

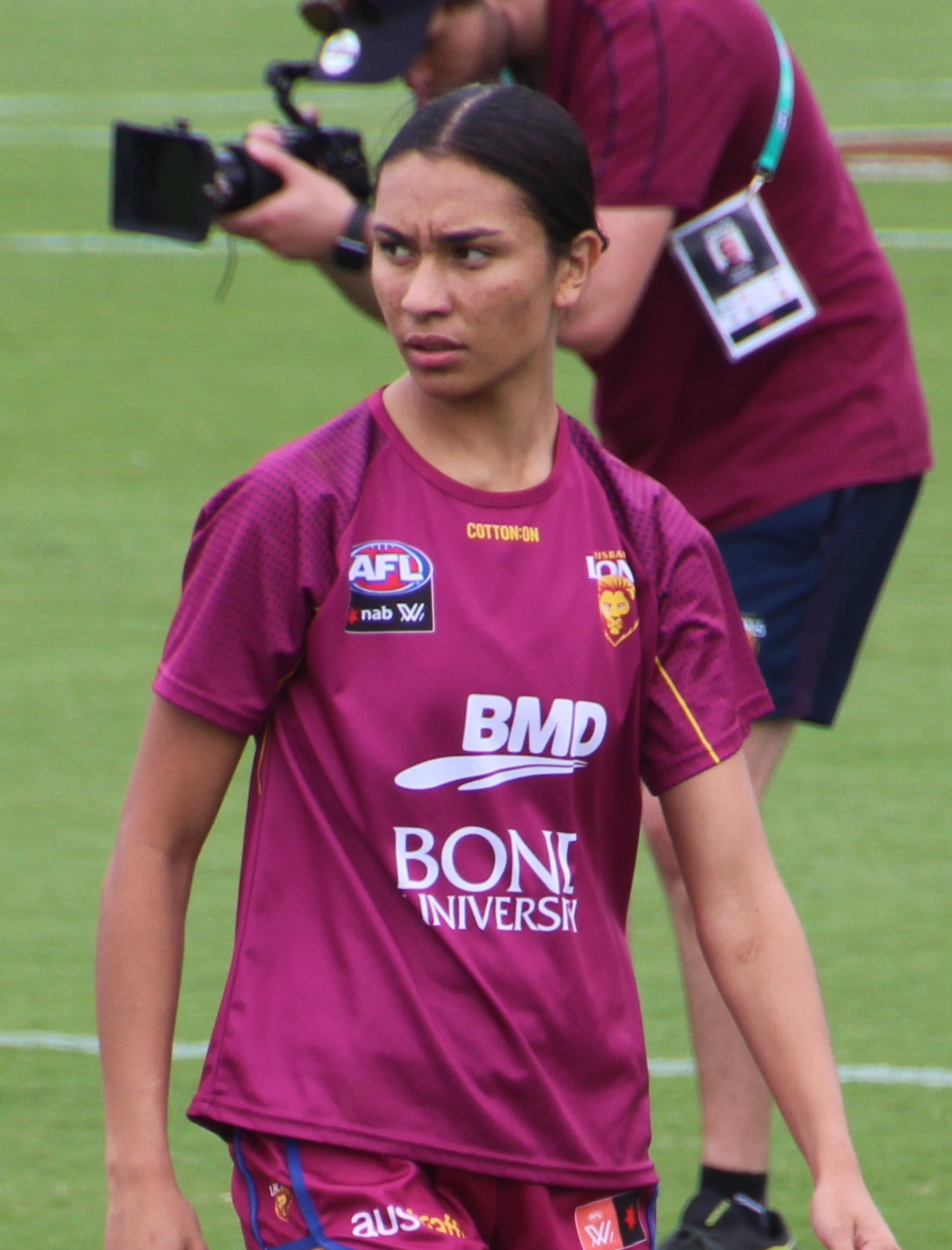
- Farquharson warming up before the 2022 season 7 Grand Final

Personal information
- Nickname: Zimmie
- Born: 27 April 2002 (age 24); Dalby, Queensland
- Original team: Yeronga South Brisbane (QAFLW)
- Draft: No. 8, 2020 AFL Women's draft
- Debut: Round 3, 2022 (S6), Brisbane vs. Carlton, at Carrara Stadium
- Height: 175 cm (5 ft 9 in)
- Position: Half-forward

Playing career^{1}
Years	Club	Games (Goals)
2021–2023	Brisbane	17 (12)
2024–2025	Western Bulldogs	2 (0)
Total		19 (12)
- ^{1} Playing statistics correct to the end of the 2025 season.

Career highlights
- AFL Women's Rising Star nominee: 2022 (S6)

Zimmorlei Farquharson (/zəˈmɔːrleɪ ˈfɑːrkwərsən/ zə-MOR-lay FAR-kwər-sən; born 27 April 2002) is an Australian rules footballer who has played for Brisbane and the Western Bulldogs in the AFL Women's (AFLW).

Farquharson was born and raised in Dalby, Queensland to a mother from Papua New Guinea and an Australian father. She attended Concordia Lutheran College throughout her upbringing.

She played for Yeronga South Brisbane in the AFL Queensland Women's League before being drafted by Brisbane with the 8th pick in the 2020 AFL Women's draft.

After spending the 2021 season on the Lions' list without making her debut, she played her first AFLW game in round 3 of 2022 season 6 in the Lions' win against Carlton at Carrara Stadium. For her debut, she received a nomination for the 2022 AFL Women's season 6 Rising Star.

She spent the 2023 season on the inactive list, citing the intensity of AFLW training demands as she began an apprenticeship outside of football. Following that season, she was traded to the Western Bulldogs in exchange for pick 41.

At the end of the 2025 AFL Women's season she was delisted by the Western Bulldogs, having played two games for the club.

== Statistics ==
Legend
G	Goals	K	Kicks	D	Disposals	T	Tackles
B	Behinds	H	Handballs	M	Marks

Season	Team	No.	Games	Totals							Averages (per game)							Votes
Season	Team	No.	Games	G	B	K	H	D	M	T	G	B	K	H	D	M	T	Votes
2021	Brisbane	22	0	—	—	—	—	—	—	—	—	—	—	—	—	—	—	0
2022 (S6)	Brisbane	22	10	7	8	44	24	68	12	25	0.7	0.8	4.4	2.4	6.8	1.2	2.5	0
2022 (S7)	Brisbane	22	7	5	3	26	10	36	10	23	0.7	0.4	3.7	1.4	5.1	1.4	3.3	0
2023	Brisbane	—	0	—	—	—	—	—	—	—	—	—	—	—	—	—	—	0
2024	Western Bulldogs	21	2	0	0	10	4	14	6	7	0.0	0.0	5.0	2.0	7.0	3.0	3.5	0
2025	Western Bulldogs	21	0	—	—	—	—	—	—	—	—	—	—	—	—	—	—	0
Career			19	12	11	80	38	118	28	55	0.6	0.6	4.2	2.0	6.2	1.5	2.9	0
