= Mia King =

Australian rules footballer

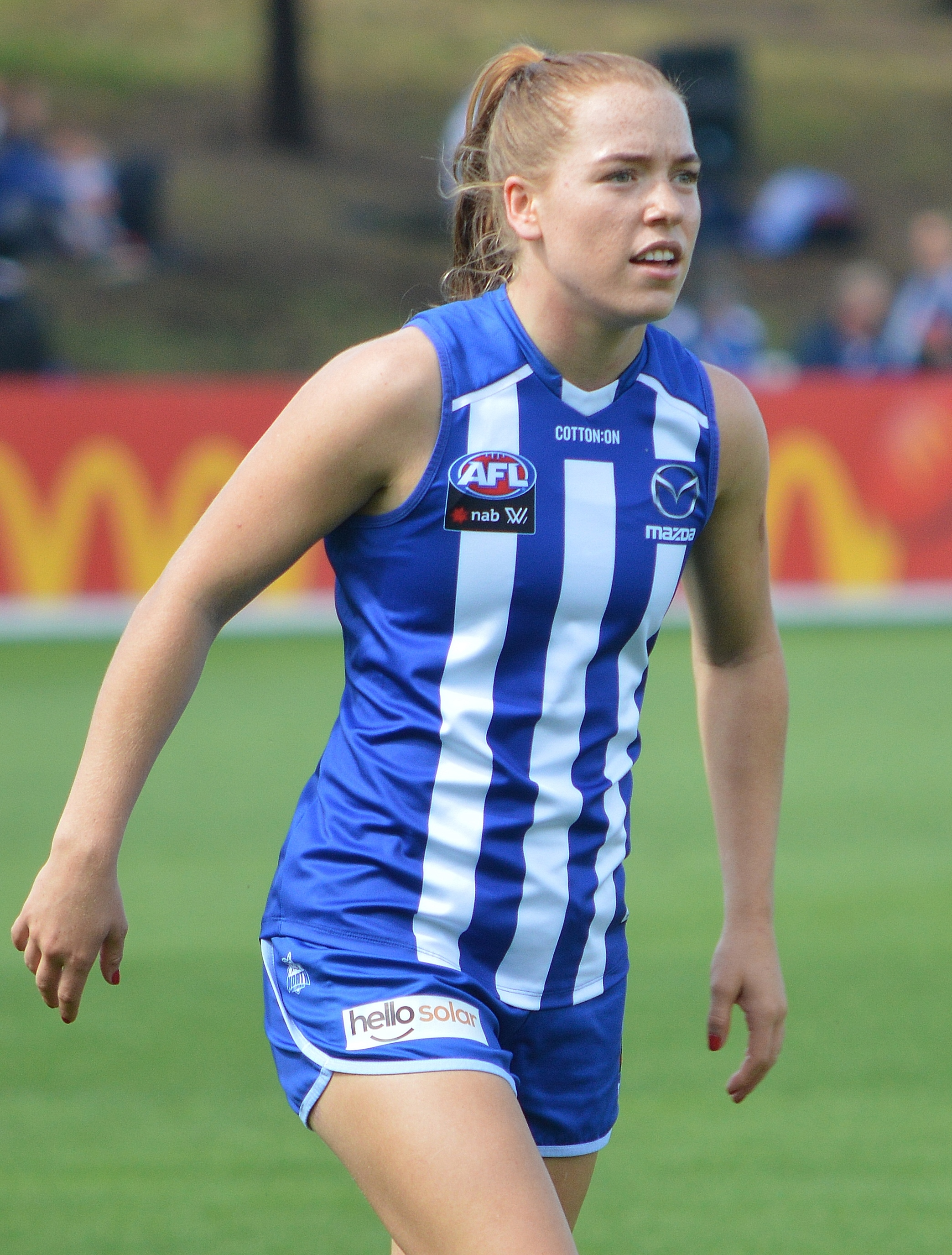
- King with North Melbourne in March 2021

Personal information
- Full name: Mia Margaret King
- Born: 6 April 2001 (age 25)
- Original team: Launceston (TWFL)
- Draft: No. 49, 2019 national draft
- Debut: Round 4, 2020, North Melbourne vs. Gold Coast, at Arden Street Oval
- Height: 166 cm (5 ft 5 in)
- Position: Midfielder

Club information
- Current club: North Melbourne
- Number: 23

Playing career^{1}
Years	Club	Games (Goals)
2020–	North Melbourne	63 (5)
- ^{1} Playing statistics correct to the end of the 2024 season.

Career highlights
- AFLW premiership player: 2024

Mia Margaret King (born 6 April 2001) is an Australian rules footballer who plays for North Melbourne in the AFL Women's (AFLW). It was revealed she signed on with the club for two more seasons on 17 June 2021, tying her to the club until the end of 2023.

== Statistics ==
Updated to the end of the 2024 season.

Legend
G	Goals	K	Kicks	D	Disposals	T	Tackles
B	Behinds	H	Handballs	M	Marks
#	Played in that season's premiership team

Season	Team	No.	Games	Totals							Averages (per game)							Votes
Season	Team	No.	Games	G	B	K	H	D	M	T	G	B	K	H	D	M	T	Votes
2020	North Melbourne	23	4	1	0	14	21	35	5	15	0.2	0.0	3.5	5.2	8.8	1.2	3.8	
2021	North Melbourne	23	9	1	1	36	52	88	15	29	0.1	0.1	4.0	5.8	9.8	1.7	3.2	
2022 (S6)	North Melbourne	23	11	3	1	68	91	159	26	68	0.3	0.1	6.2	8.3	14.5	2.4	6.2	
2022 (S7)	North Melbourne	23	13	0	4	104	86	190	27	66	0.0	0.3	8.0	6.6	14.6	2.1	5.1	
2023	North Melbourne	23	12	0	1	122	121	243	25	107	0.0	0.1	10.2	10.1	20.2	2.1	8.9	
2024^{#}	North Melbourne	23	14	0	1	124	142	266	21	130	0.0	0.1	8.9	10.1	19.0	1.5	9.3	
Career			63	5	8	468	513	981	119	415	0.1	0.1	7.4	8.1	15.6	1.9	6.6	
