= Montana McKinnon =

Australian rules footballer

Personal information
- Full name: Montana McKinnon
- Born: 14 July 2001 (age 25)
- Original team: South Adelaide (SANFLW)
- Draft: No. 14, 2019 national draft
- Debut: Round 5, 2020, Adelaide vs. North Melbourne, at North Hobart Oval
- Height: 183 cm (6 ft 0 in)
- Position: Ruck

Club information
- Current club: Richmond

Playing career^{1}
| Years | Club | Games (Goals) |
| 2020–2023 | Adelaide | 31 (1) |
| 2024– | Richmond | 0 (0) |
| Total | | 31 (1) |
- ^{1} Playing statistics correct to the end of the 2023 season.

Montana McKinnon (born 14 July 2001) is an Australian rules footballer who plays for Richmond in the AFL Women's (AFLW). She has previously played for Adelaide.
