= AFL Women's Under-18 Championships =

Australian rules football tournament

- Current season, competition or edition: 2024 AFL Women's Under 18 Championships
- Formerly: AFL Youth Girls National Championship
- Sport: Australian rules football
- First season: 2010
- Administrator: Australian Football League
- No. of teams: 10
- Country: Australia
- Most recent champion: South Australia (2023)
- Sponsor: National Australia Bank
- Related competitions: AFL Under 18 Championships
- Tournament format: Round-robin

The NAB AFL Women's Under-18 Championships are the annual national Australian rules football championships for women players aged 18 years or younger. The competition is seen as one of the main pathways towards being drafted into a team in the professional AFL Women's competition (AFLW). Originally known as the AFL Youth Girls National Championship, the competition has teams of players representing their states and territories in a round robin tournament. The tournament is currently sponsored by the National Australia Bank. The winner of the 2019 tournament was Vic Metro.

== History ==
A 2008 series between the Queensland and Victoria teams was the predecessor to a national state-based competition for young female footballers. The inaugural competition was conducted in September 2010, in Craigieburn, Victoria. Six teams competed: Western Australia, South Australia, Queensland, a combined New South Wales and Australian Capital Territory side (NSW/ACT), and two Victorian squads. These were divided into two pools—first: an AFL Victoria Development squad combined with an East section, which consisted of NSW/ACT and Queensland players; and West, made up of players from South Australia, Western Australia, and Victoria. Teams played three regular games against the sides from the opposite pool before a finals series.

Several team changes occurred in 2012 and 2013. In 2012, the Victorian team was split into Victoria Metro and Victoria Country. A combined Northern Territory–Tasmania team known as the Thunder Devils and an Indigenous Australian side called the Woomeras entered the tournament in 2014. In 2021 the Woomeras were joined by the Medleys, a multicultural under-17 representative program.

AFL Women's, a national women's league which was inaugurated in 2017, allowed the championships to become a formalised pathway competition to the national league. Consequently the name of the competition was changed to AFL Women's Under 18 Championships, having previously been known as the AFL Under 18 Youth Girls Championships. Changes were also made to tournament structure. The tournament was played over two rounds; in the first round, South Australia, Tasmania and the Northern Territory played in a separate division. The best players from the states combined to form an Allies team, which competed in the second round against the other states (the Woomeras did not compete). In 2018, a similar Eastern Allies team was established (made up of NSW/ACT and Tasmania players), bringing the total number of teams to 10.

There was no championships staged in 2020 due to the impact of the COVID-19 pandemic, which caused the 2021 tournament to have an increased age eligibility by one year (under-19).

=== Tournaments ===
Year	Division 1 Premiers	D1 B&F	Division 2 Premiers	D2 B&F	Notes	Ref.
2010	(Victoria (state)) Victoria	Katie Brennan (Queensland)	None	None		
2011	(Victoria (state)) Victoria	Ellie Blackburn (Victoria)	None	None		
2012	(Victoria (state)) Vic Metro	Caitlin Williams (South Australia)	None	None		
2013	(Victoria (state)) Vic Metro	Ellie Blackburn (Vic Metro)	None	None		
2014	Western Australia	Hayley Miller (Western Australia)	(Northern Territory) Woomeras	Danielle Ponter (Thunder Devils)		
2015	(Victoria (state)) Vic Metro	Tayla Harris (Queensland)	South Australia	Sarah Allan (South Australia)		
2016	(Victoria (state)) Vic Metro	Courtney Hodder (Western Australia)	(New South Wales) / (Australian Capital Territory) NSW/ACT	Lizzie Stokely (Tasmania)		
2016	(Victoria (state)) Vic Metro	Courtney Hodder (Western Australia)	(New South Wales) / (Australian Capital Territory) NSW/ACT	Daria Bannister (Tasmania)		
2017	(Victoria (state)) Vic Country	Maddy Prespakis (Vic Metro)	None	None		
2018	(Victoria (state)) Vic Country	Maddy Prespakis (Vic Metro)	None	None		
2018	(Victoria (state)) Vic Country	Nina Morrison (Vic Country)	None	None		
2019	(Victoria (state)) Vic Metro	Georgia Patrikios (Vic Metro)	None	None		
2020	DNP (COVID-19)	–				
2021	None (COVID-19)	None	None	None	A series of challenge matches were played, but there was no winner declared	
2022	South Australia	Shineah Goody (South Australia)	None	None		
2023	South Australia	Havana Harris (Queensland)	None	None		
2024	(Victoria (state)) Vic Metro	Sierra Grieves (Vic Metro)	None	None		
2025	(Victoria (state)) Vic Metro	Chloe Bown (Vic Metro)	None	None		

Source: List of Winners (pp. 4)

=== Division 1 Placings ===
Season	Winner	Second	Third	Fourth	Fifth	Sixth
2010	Victoria	Western Australia	Queensland	South Australia	Victoria Development	NSW/ACT
2011	Victoria	Western Australia	Queensland	South Australia	Victoria Development	NSW/ACT
2012	Victoria	Queensland	Western Australia	South Australia	Victoria Development	NSW/ACT
2013	Victoria Metro	Western Australia	Queensland	VIC Country/TAS	SA/NT	NSW/ACT

Season	Winner	Second	Third	Fourth
2014	Western Australia	Victoria Metro	Queensland	Victoria Country
2015	Victoria Metro	Queensland	Western Australia	Victoria Country
2016	Victoria Metro	Western Australia	Victoria Country	Queensland

Season	Winner	Second	Third	Fourth	Fifth	Sixth
2017	Victoria Country	Allies	Western Australia	Victoria Metro	Queensland	NSW/ACT
2018	Victoria Country	Victoria Metro	Queensland	Western Australia	Eastern Allies	Central Allies
2019	Victoria Metro	Victoria Country	Queensland	Western Australia	Eastern Allies	Central Allies
2020	Not contested due to the COVID-19 pandemic					
2021	Not contested due to the COVID-19 pandemic					
2022	South Australia	Victoria Metro	Queensland	Allies	Western Australia	Victoria Country
2023	South Australia	Queensland	Victoria Metro	Western Australia	Victoria Country	Allies
2024	Victoria Metro	South Australia	Queensland	Victoria Country	Allies	Western Australia
2025	Victoria Metro	Queensland	South Australia	Western Australia	Victoria Country	Allies
2026	South Australia	Allies	Victoria Metro	Victoria Country	Queensland	Western Australia

=== Division 2 Placings ===
Season	Winner	Second	Third	Fourth
2014	Woomeras	NSW/ACT	South Australia	Thunder Devils
2015	South Australia	NSW/ACT	Woomeras	Thunder Devils

Season	Winner	Second	Third	Fourth	Fifth
2016	NSW/ACT	Northern Territory	South Australia	Tasmania	Woomeras

Season	Winner	Second	Third
2017	South Australia	Tasmania	Northern Territory

==== Northern Academy Series (2023-present) ====
Season	Winner	Second	Third	Fourth	Fifth
2023	Gold Coast Suns	Sydney Swans	Brisbane Lions	GWS Giants	Northern Territory
2024	Gold Coast Suns	Brisbane Lions	GWS Giants	Sydney Swans	Northern Territory
2025	GWS Giants	Sydney Swans	Brisbane Lions	Northern Territory	Gold Coast Suns
2026	Brisbane Lions	Sydney Swans	Northern Territory	GWS Giants	Gold Coast Suns

== See also ==
- AFL Under-19 Championships
- AFL Women's National Championship
