= Georgia Patrikios =

Australian rules footballer

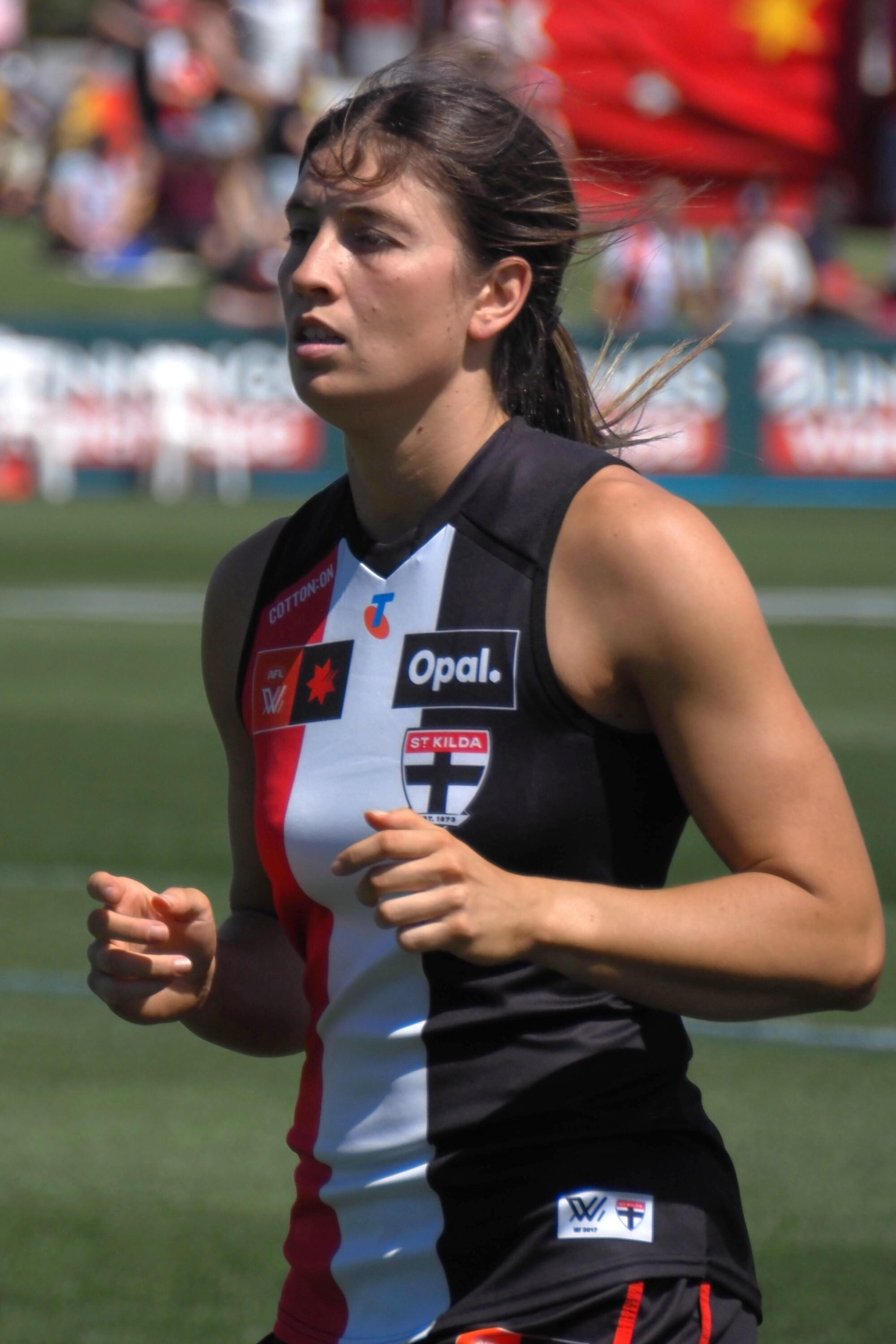
- Patrikios pre-match with St Kilda in 2025

Personal information
- Full name: Georgia Patrikios
- Born: 30 March 2001 (age 25)
- Original team: Essendon (VFLW)
- Draft: No. 5, 2019 national draft
- Debut: Round 1, 2020, St Kilda vs. Western Bulldogs, at RSEA Park
- Height: 169 cm (5 ft 7 in)
- Position: Midfielder

Club information
- Current club: St Kilda
- Number: 21

Playing career^{1}
Years	Club	Games (Goals)
2020–	St Kilda	48 (13)
- ^{1} Playing statistics correct to the end of the 2025 season.

Career highlights
- AFL Women's All-Australian team: 2021; 2× St Kilda best and fairest: 2020, 2021; AFLPA AFLW best first-year player: 2020; AFL Women's Rising Star nominee: 2020

Georgia Patrikios (born 30 March 2001) is an Australian rules footballer playing for the St Kilda Football Club in the AFL Women's (AFLW). Patrikios received a nomination for the 2020 AFL Women's Rising Star award in round 1 of the 2020 season, her debut match, and went on to be named the AFL Players Association (AFLPA) AFLW best first-year player that year. She won the inaugural two St Kilda best and fairest awards (sharing the first in a four-way tie) and was selected in the 2021 AFL Women's All-Australian team.

== Early life ==
Patrikios grew up supporting the Carlton Football Club and played for West Coburg in the Essendon District Football League (EDFL). In 2017, she was one of two ambassadors for Essendon's AFLW bid alongside Michaela Long, daughter of dual Essendon premiership player Michael.

In 2019, Patrikios was named in the All-Australian team at that year's national championships and the NAB League Girls team of the year, and was named player of the tournament in Vic Metro's undefeated campaign. She also played four games for Essendon in the VFL Women's (VFLW) that year and was named among the best players in all four games, winning best afield honours on three occasions.

== AFL Women's career ==
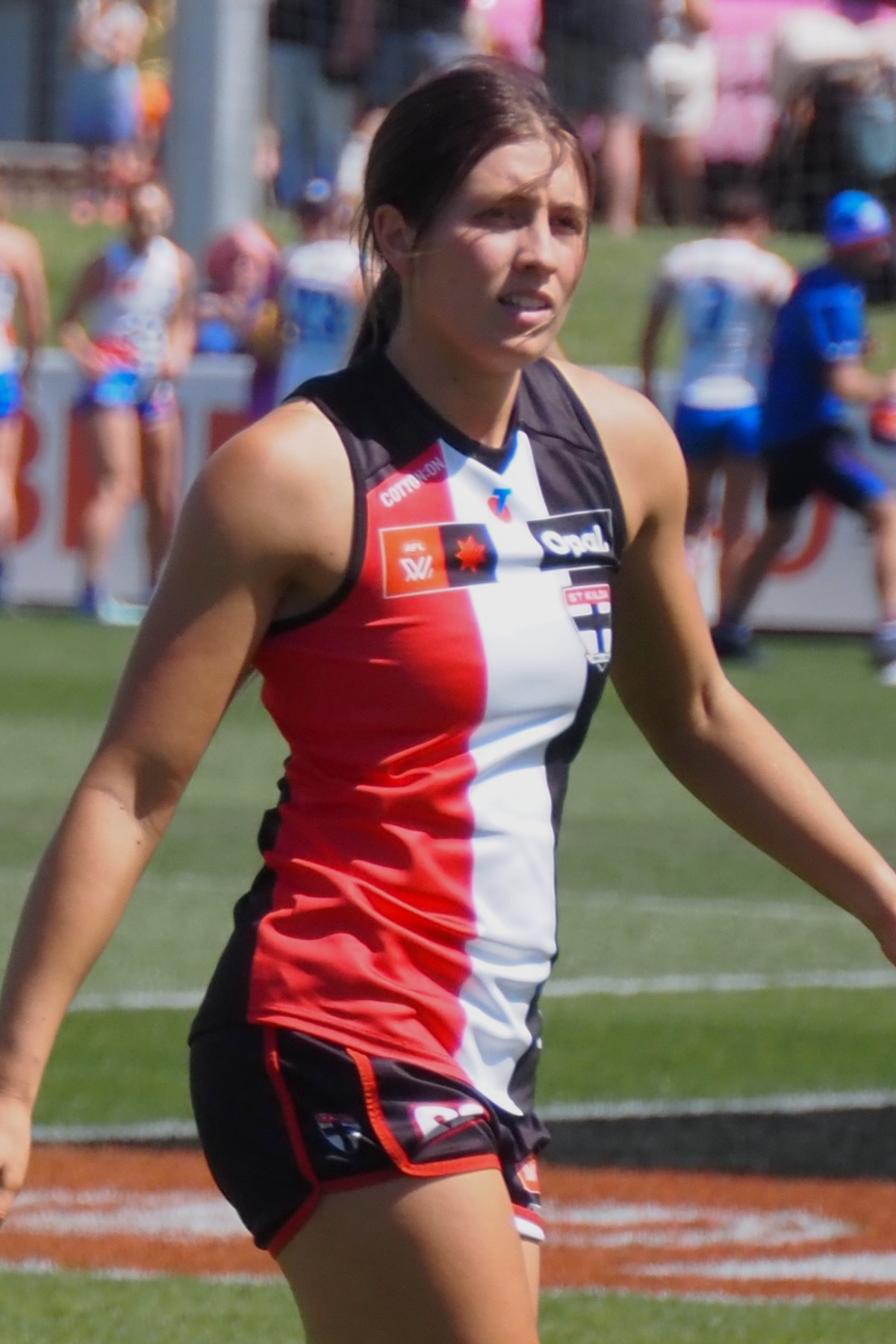
Patrikios pre-match with St Kilda in 2025

Patrikios was drafted by St Kilda with the club's first selection and the fifth pick overall in the 2019 AFL Women's draft. She made her debut against the Western Bulldogs at RSEA Park in the opening round of the 2020 season and was nominated for the 2020 AFL Women's Rising Star award for her 18-disposal performance in that match. Patrikios went on to be selected in the initial 40-woman squad for the 2020 AFL Women's All-Australian team, and was also selected in the AFL Players Association (AFLPA)'s inaugural AFL Women's 22under22 team and named the AFLPA AFLW best first-year player for that season. She was also named as one of four inaugural St Kilda best and fairest winners later that year, alongside Rosie Dillon, Caitlin Greiser and Olivia Vesely.

Leading into the 2021 season, womens.afl journalist Sarah Black named Patrikios at no. 30 on her annual list of the top 30 players in the AFLW. Patrikios was best afield for St Kilda in each of its first four matches, kicking her first career goal in round 1 and recording a career-high 27 disposals in round 2, and was selected in womens.afl's Team of the Week in rounds 1 and 2. She broke her career disposals record in consecutive weeks after recording 29 and 30 disposals in rounds 8 and 9 respectively. At the end of the season, Patrikios won her second St Kilda best and fairest award ahead of first-year midfielder Tyanna Smith. She was also named in the 2021 AFL Women's All-Australian team on the wing, her first time being named in the honorary team, and achieved selection in Champion Data's 2021 AFLW All-Star stats team, after finishing second for both average uncontested possessions and average disposals during the 2021 season with 13.3 and 23.9 a game respectively.

In October 2021, Patrikios took personal leave from the club, revealing in a statement the following month that she had not yet received a COVID-19 vaccination in line with the league's new vaccination policy and had requested more time to research and discuss her options with her family before making a decision. She was later named at no. 16 in Sarah Black's 2022 list of the top 30 players in the AFLW. Patrikios never received a vaccination and eventually missed the 2022 season; however, on 14 July, the league removed the mandate in line with changes to state and territory government guidelines, allowing her to play in season seven later in 2022, and the club confirmed the following day that she would return to training. She said the following month that she chose not to receive the vaccine because it "wasn't the right time [...] it was so forced upon, and [she] wanted to take a step back and assess it".

== Statistics ==
Updated to the end of the 2025 season.

Legend
G	Goals	K	Kicks	D	Disposals	T	Tackles
B	Behinds	H	Handballs	M	Marks
†	Led the league for the season

Season	Team	No.	Games	Totals							Averages (per game)							Votes
Season	Team	No.	Games	G	B	K	H	D	M	T	G	B	K	H	D	M	T	Votes
2020	St Kilda	21	6	0	2	65	29	94	11	21	0.0	0.3	10.8	4.8	15.7	1.8	3.5	7
2021	St Kilda	21	9	2	3	130	85	215	23	44	0.2	0.3	14.4	9.4	23.9^{†}	2.6	4.9	7
2022 (S6)	St Kilda	21	0	—	—	—	—	—	—	—	—	—	—	—	—	—	—	0
2022 (S7)	St Kilda	21	10	2	2	118	46	164	14	45	0.2	0.2	11.8	4.6	16.4	1.4	4.5	3
2023	St Kilda	21	10	3	2	107	69	176	17	38	0.3	0.2	10.7	6.9	17.6	1.7	3.8	5
2024	St Kilda	21	0	—	—	—	—	—	—	—	—	—	—	—	—	—	—	0
2025	St Kilda	21	13	6	3	159	101	260	39	56	0.5	0.2	12.2	7.8	20.0	3.0	4.3	2
Career			48	13	12	579	330	909	104	203	0.3	0.3	12.1	6.9	18.9	2.2	4.2	24

== Honours and achievements ==
- AFL Women's All-Australian team: 2021
- 2× St Kilda best and fairest: 2020, 2021
- AFLPA AFLW best first-year player: 2020
- AFL Women's Rising Star nominee: 2020
