= 2020 AFL Women's Rising Star =

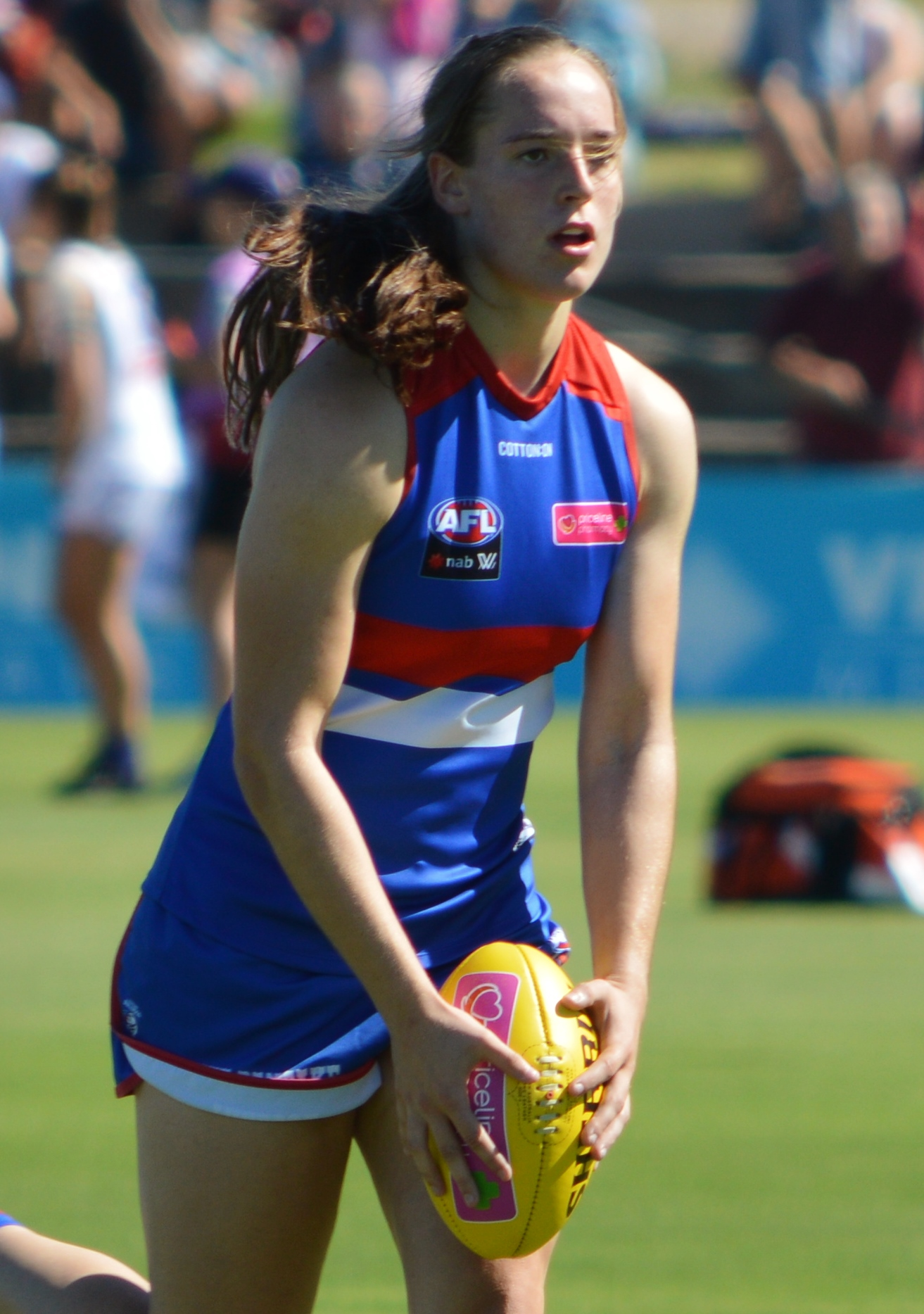
- Isabel Huntington, 2020 winner
- Sponsored by: National Australia Bank
- Country: Australia

The 2020 NAB AFL Women's Rising Star award was presented to the player adjudged the best young player during the 2020 AFL Women's season. Isabel Huntington of the Western Bulldogs won the award with 33 votes.

== Eligibility ==
Every round, two nominations will be given to standout young players who performed well during that particular round. To be eligible for nomination, players must have been under 21 years of age on 1 January 2020, not have been suspended during the season and never previously been nominated.

== Nominations ==
Table of nominees
Round	Player	Club	Ref.
1	Lucy McEvoy	Carlton	
1	Georgia Patrikios	St Kilda	
2	Roxy Roux	Fremantle	
2	Jesse Wardlaw	Brisbane	
3	Caitlin Greiser	St Kilda	
3	Kalinda Howarth	Gold Coast	
4	Grace Egan	Carlton	
4	Gabby Newton	Western Bulldogs	
5	Olivia Vesely	St Kilda	
5	Charlotte Wilson	Carlton	
6	Isabel Huntington	Western Bulldogs	
6	Tait Mackrill	Greater Western Sydney	

Table of nominations by club
Number	Club	Player	Nom.
3	Carlton	Lucy McEvoy	1
3	Carlton	Grace Egan	4
3	Carlton	Charlotte Wilson	5
3	St Kilda	Georgia Patrikios	1
3	St Kilda	Caitlin Greiser	3
3	St Kilda	Olivia Vesely	5
2	Western Bulldogs	Gabby Newton	4
2	Western Bulldogs	Isabel Huntington	6
1	Brisbane	Jesse Wardlaw	2
1	Fremantle	Roxy Roux	2
1	Gold Coast	Kalinda Howarth	3
1	Greater Western Sydney	Tait Mackrill	6

== Final voting ==
Table of votes
Placing	Player	Club	Nom.	Votes
1	Isabel Huntington	Western Bulldogs	6	33
2	Caitlin Greiser	St Kilda	3	30
3	Kalinda Howarth	Gold Coast	3	24
3	Georgia Patrikios	St Kilda	1	24
5	Jesse Wardlaw	Brisbane	2	5
6	Grace Egan	Carlton	4	2
7	Lucy McEvoy	Carlton	1	1
7	Roxy Roux	Fremantle	2	1
