= Isabel Huntington =

Australian rules footballer

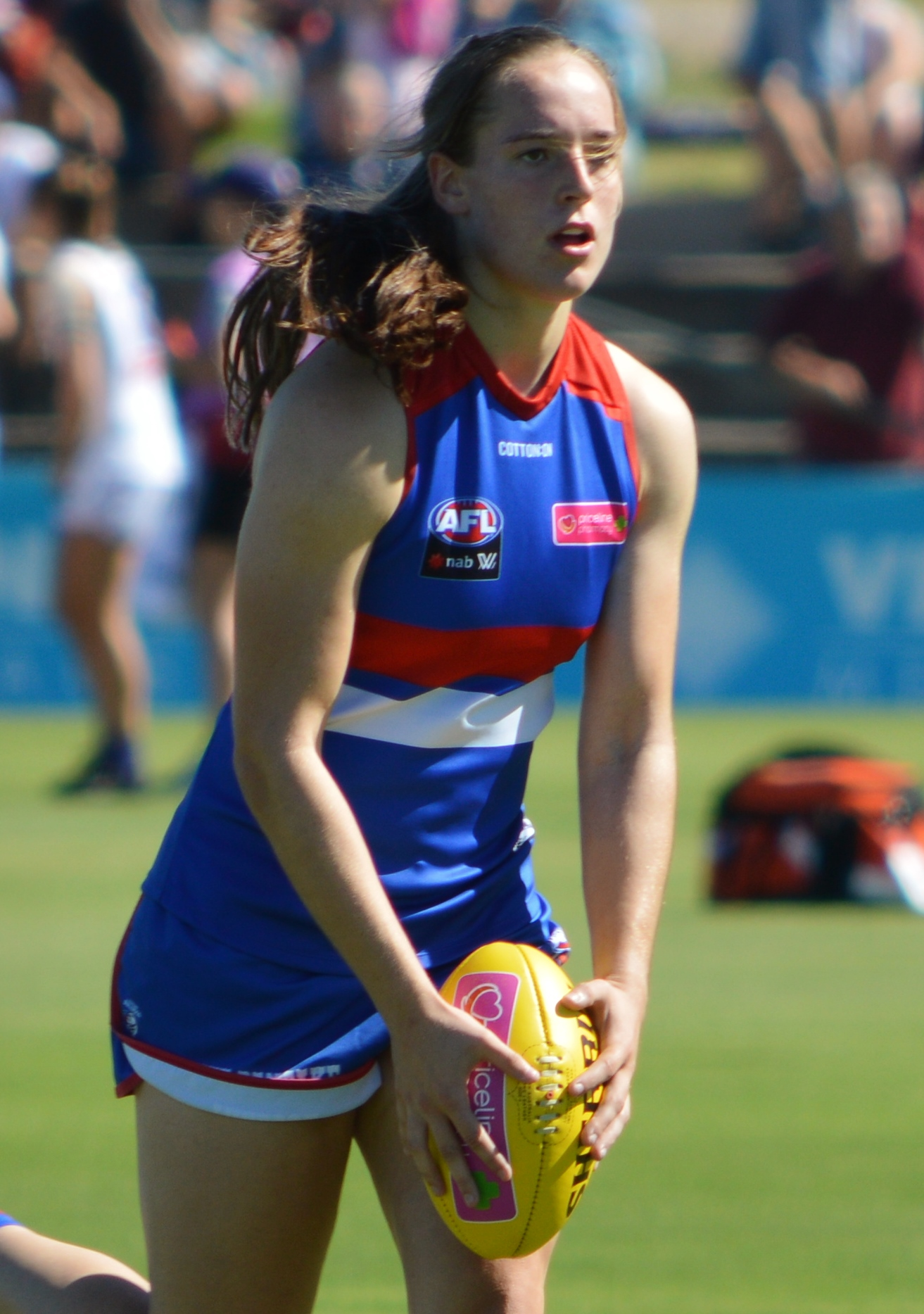
- Huntington playing for the Western Bulldogs in February 2018

Personal information
- Nickname: Izzy
- Born: 25 February 1999 (age 27)
- Original team: Melbourne Uni (VFL Women's)
- Draft: No. 1, 2017 AFL Women's draft
- Debut: Round 1, 2018, Western Bulldogs vs. Fremantle, at VU Whitten Oval
- Height: 175 cm (5 ft 9 in)
- Positions: Forward, Defender

Club information
- Current club: Greater Western Sydney
- Number: 12

Playing career^{1}
Years	Club	Games (Goals)
2018–2022 (S6)	Western Bulldogs	20 (18)
2022 (S7)–	Greater Western Sydney	35 (10)
Total		55 (28)
- ^{1} Playing statistics correct to the end of the 2023 season.

Career highlights
- 22under22 team: 2020; AFL Women's Rising Star: 2020; AFL Women's All-Australian team (2020); Western Bulldogs best and fairest: 2020; Western Bulldogs leading goalkicker: 2021

Isabel Huntington (born 25 February 1999) is an Australian rules footballer playing for Greater Western Sydney in the AFL Women's (AFLW). She was drafted to the Western Bulldogs with the first pick in the 2017 AFL Women's draft.

== Early life and junior football ==
Huntington was an exceptional junior footballer, impressing particularly at the 2016 AFL Youth Girls National Championships. In one match she kicked five goals (including four in one quarter) and recorded 30 disposals, all in a shortened match of 12-minute quarters.

Huntington endured injury plagued teenage years, suffering a broken leg in 2015 and a ruptured anterior cruciate ligament in her knee in 2016 that saw her miss the entirety of the 2017 junior and state-league football season. Despite not being able to play with the side due to the injury she trained in a limited capacity that year with Melbourne University who play in the VFL Women's competition.

Huntington completed high school at St Michael's Grammar School in St Kilda in Melbourne's south. She was school captain there in her final year in 2017 and graduated with an ATAR of 98.10 that placed her in the top two per cent of students in the country. She had aspirations to study medicine and work as a doctor.

== AFL Women's career ==
Huntington was drafted by the Western Bulldogs with the first overall selection in the 2017 AFL Women's draft.

=== 2018 season: Debut ===
She made her debut in a twenty-six point win over Fremantle at VU Whitten Oval in the opening round of the 2018 season. The following round she played a key role in the first half of the Bulldogs' win over Brisbane, including one stretch where she took consecutive contested forward-50 marks and kicked back-to-back goals in the space of a minute. Soon after though she was involved in a loose-ball chase that saw her sustain a serious knee injury and sit out the remainder of the match. Scans later confirmed she had sustained a season ending ruptured anterior cruciate ligament.

=== 2019 season: Injury ===
Huntington suffered a sprain to her reconstructed knee in mid-December 2018, the result of which kept her out of playing for the team until round 5 of the 2019 AFL Women's season.

=== 2020 season: Rising Star ===
The 2020 AFL Women's season was a successful one for Huntington, winning many accolades and rapidly improving as she switched to the Bulldogs' back line. She had her best game for the season in the 3rd round, where the Bulldogs suffered a 21 point loss to Carlton. In that game, she collected 15 disposals, 7 marks, which was her career record at that point, and 4 tackles. She received a 2020 AFL Women's Rising Star nomination in the last round of the home and away season, after collecting 15 disposals, 6 marks and 2 tackles in the Western Bulldogs' 15 point loss to Fremantle. She finished the season as the Bulldogs' leading mark taker, with a total of 24 over her 5 games that season. She also finished equal 1st in the league for contested marks and 2nd for intercept marks. She won the prestigious AFL Women's Rising Star award at the conclusion of the season, receiving a total of 34 votes, 4 ahead of second-placed Caitlin Greiser. The win made her the Bulldogs' first ever Rising Star winner. She also won her maiden All-Australian blazer, being placed on the half back line. She also won the team's best and fairest award, with a total of 44 votes, 3 ahead of second-placed Ellie Blackburn.

=== 2021 season: Forward switch ===
It was revealed that Huntington had signed a contract extension with the club on 16 June 2021, after playing every game possible for the club that season. Huntington achieved selection in Champion Data's 2021 AFLW All-Star stats team, after leading the league for average contested marks in the 2021 AFL Women's season, totalling 2.3 a game.

=== 2022 season 6: Injury and leaving Western Bulldogs ===
In the first round of 2022 AFL Women's season 6, Huntington suffered an anterior cruciate ligament injury, and at the end of the season was traded to Greater Western Sydney in exchange for two draft picks.

== Personal life ==
Huntington is a cousin of Essendon AFL player Will Setterfield. She studied a Bachelor of Science at the University of Melbourne.

== Statistics ==
Statistics are correct to the end of the 2021 season.

Legend
G	Goals	K	Kicks	D	Disposals	T	Tackles
B	Behinds	H	Handballs	M	Marks

Season	Team	No.	Games	Totals							Averages (per game)							Votes
Season	Team	No.	Games	G	B	K	H	D	M	T	G	B	K	H	D	M	T	Votes
2018	Western Bulldogs	9	2	2	0	11	3	14	8	2	1.0	0.0	5.5	1.5	7.0	4.0	1.0	0
2019	Western Bulldogs	4	3	2	1	10	6	16	7	7	0.7	0.3	3.3	2.0	5.3	2.3	2.3	0
2020	Western Bulldogs	4	5	1	1	49	16	65	24	13	0.2	0.2	9.8	3.2	13.0	4.8	2.6	0
2021	Western Bulldogs	4	9	12	9	52	27	79	40	6	1.3	1.0	5.8	3.0	8.8	4.4	0.7	2
Career			19	17	11	122	52	174	79	28	0.9	0.6	6.4	2.7	9.2	4.2	1.5	2
