= Lucy McEvoy =

Australian rules footballer

Personal information
- Born: 13 May 2001 (age 25)
- Original team: Geelong Falcons (NAB League Girls)
- Draft: No. 2, 2019 national draft
- Debut: Round 1, 2020, Carlton vs. Richmond, at Ikon Park
- Height: 170 cm (5 ft 7 in)

Club information
- Current club: Sydney

Playing career^{1}
Years	Club	Games (Goals)
2020–S7 (2022)	Carlton	33 (6)
2023–	Sydney	12 (3)
Total		45 (9)
- ^{1} Playing statistics correct to the end of the 2023 season.

Career highlights
- AFL Women's Rising Star nominee: 2020

Lucy McEvoy (born 13 May 2001) is an Australian rules footballer playing for the Sydney Swans in the AFL Women's (AFLW). McEvoy was drafted by Carlton with their first selection and second overall in the 2019 AFL Women's draft. She made her debut against Richmond at Ikon Park in the opening round of the 2020 season. She signed a 2-year contract with Carlton on 10 June 2021, after it was revealed the team had conducted a mass re-signing of 13 players. In March 2023, McEvoy joined Sydney during the priority signing period.

== Statistics ==
Statistics are correct to the end of the 2020 season.

Legend
G	Goals	K	Kicks	D	Disposals	T	Tackles
B	Behinds	H	Handballs	M	Marks

Season	Team	No.	Games	Totals							Averages (per game)							Votes
Season	Team	No.	Games	G	B	K	H	D	M	T	G	B	K	H	D	M	T	Votes
2020	Carlton	13	7	3	3	44	47	91	13	29	0.4	0.4	6.3	6.7	13.0	1.9	4.1	
Career			7	3	3	44	47	91	13	29	0.4	0.4	6.3	6.7	13.0	1.9	4.1	
