= Tait Mackrill =

Australian rules footballer (born 1999)

Personal information
- Born: 3 September 1999 (age 27)
- Original team: Morphettville Park (SFL)
- Draft: No. 9, 2017 rookie draft
- Debut: Round 3, 2019, Greater Western Sydney vs. Carlton, at Blacktown International Sportspark
- Height: 168 cm (5 ft 6 in)
- Position: Forward

Playing career^{1}
Years	Club	Games (Goals)
2018–2023	Greater Western Sydney	22 (5)
- ^{1} Playing statistics correct to the end of the 2023 season.

Career highlights
- AFL Women's Rising Star nominee: 2020

Tait Mackrill (born 3 September 1999) is an Australian rules footballer who played for Greater Western Sydney (GWS) in the AFL Women's (AFLW). She was drafted in the 2017 AFLW rookie draft before debuting in round 3 of the 2019 season.

== Early life ==
From Port Broughton, South Australia, Mackrill has a footballing background; her father played more than 200 matches for his local team. She originally played for the Broughton-Mundoora Football Club. After a move to Adelaide, she began playing for Morphettville Park and later represented Adelaide University.

She began studying psychology at university during her football career, majoring in criminology.

== AFLW career ==
Mackrill was drafted by GWS with pick 9 in the 2017 AFLW rookie draft, their second selection. She did not play a match in her first season. Over the off-season, Mackrill played in Essendon's inaugural VFL Women's side. She made her AFLW debut in round 3 of the 2019 season against Carlton, which was the subject of a 7:30 television interview.

Mackrill was delisted at the conclusion of the 2019 season. She was later redrafted by GWS with pick #95. In the sixth round of the 2020 season, Mackrill was nominated for the 2020 AFL Women's Rising Star award.

Mackrill was again delisted by GWS in November 2023.
