= St Kilda best and fairest (AFL Women's) =

- Awarded for: The best and fairest player of the St Kilda Football Club in the AFL Women's
- Country: Australia
- Presented by: St Kilda Football Club
- First award: 2020
- Currently held by: Tyanna Smith

In the AFL Women's (AFLW), the St Kilda best and fairest award is awarded to the best and fairest player at the St Kilda Football Club during the home-and-away season, equivalent to the Trevor Barker Award for the men's team. The award has been awarded annually since the club's inaugural season in the competition in 2020.

The inaugural count, held remotely due to the COVID-19 pandemic, resulted in a four-way tie.

== Recipients ==
**Bold**	Denotes current player
	Player won AFL Women's best and fairest in same season

Season	Recipient(s)	Ref.
2020	Rosie Dillon	
2020	Caitlin Greiser	
2020	**Georgia Patrikios**	
2020	**Olivia Vesely**	
2021	**Georgia Patrikios** (2)	
2022 (S6)	**Bianca Jakobsson**	
2022 (S7)	Kate Shierlaw	
2023	**Jaimee Lambert**	
2024	**Jaimee Lambert** (2)	
2025	**Tyanna Smith**	

== See also ==
- Trevor Barker Award (list of St Kilda Football Club best and fairest winners in the Australian Football League)
