= Grace Egan =

Australian rules footballer (born 2000)

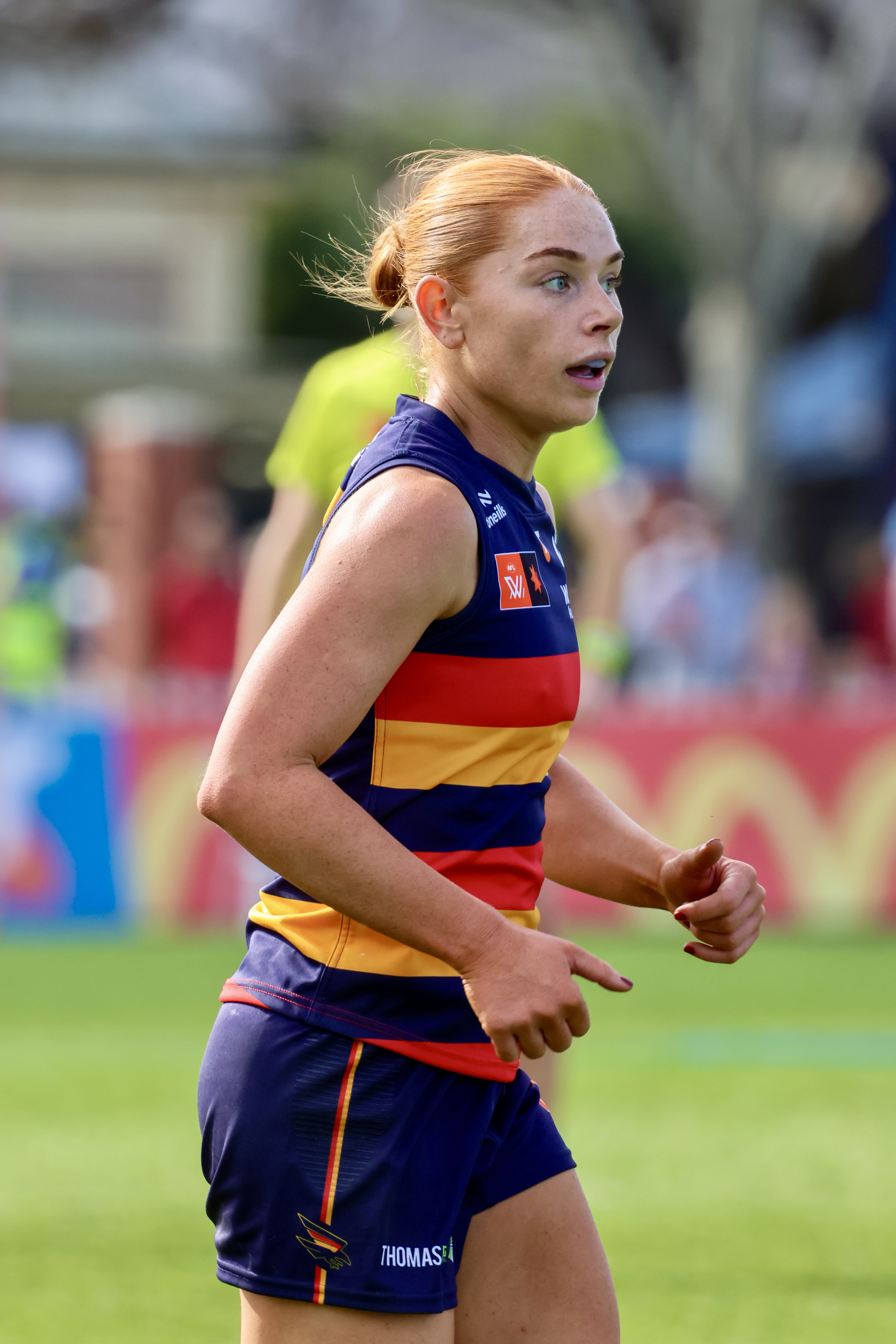
- Egan with Adelaide in 2026

Personal information
- Born: 1 June 2000 (age 26); Victoria, Australia
- Original teams: Richmond (VFLW); Murray Bushrangers (Talent League Girls); Shepparton (GVL)
- Draft: No. 13, 2019 national draft
- Debut: Round 1, 2020, Carlton vs. Richmond, at Ikon Park
- Height: 170 cm (5 ft 7 in)
- Position: Midfielder

Club information
- Current club: Adelaide
- Number: 3

Playing career^{1}
Years	Club	Games (Goals)
2020–2022 (S6)	Carlton	23 (2)
2022 (S7)–2025	Richmond	43 (4)
2026–	Adelaide	3 (3)
Total		69 (9)
- ^{1} Playing statistics correct to the end of round 3, 2026.

Career highlights
- Rising Star nominee: 2020

Grace Egan (born 1 June 2000) is an Australian rules footballer playing for Adelaide in the AFL Women's (AFLW). She has previously played for Carlton and Richmond. She was drafted from Richmond in the VFL Women's, and originally played for the Shepparton Football Club in the Goulburn Valley Football League.

Egan's sister Holly plays for Fremantle.

== AFLW career ==
=== Carlton (2020–2022) ===
After playing two years with Richmond's VFLW team, Egan was drafted by Carlton with their second selection and thirteenth overall in the 2019 AFL Women's draft. She made her debut against Richmond at Ikon Park in the opening round of the 2020 season. In round 4 of that season, Egan would be nominated for the Rising Star for her performance against Adelaide. She collected 18 possessions and six marks in Carlton's narrow victory. In her first two seasons, Egan finished fourth and sixth in Carlton's best and fairest award.

=== Richmond (2022–2025) ===
In June 2022, following 23 games across three seasons for the Blues, Egan was traded and returned to Richmond. It was a successful return for Egan, who became a pivotal member of Richmond's midfield and in 2024 was second at the club for disposals and finished sixth in their best and fairest count.

Prior to the 2025 season, Egan fell ill and was hospitalised for three weeks. Between March and August 2025, she was admirably able to recover her body in time to play the round one match against Sydney. She returned to her best form in 2025, including a 24-disposal performance against Brisbane and once again featuring in the best and fairest award, finishing fifth. However, at the conclusion of another disappointing season for the Tigers, Richmond informed Egan to explore her options at other clubs.

=== Adelaide (2026–present) ===
With interest from multiple clubs, Egan eventually secured a 2025 trade to Adelaide. Making her club debut in the round one, 2026 loss to Sydney, Egan's life as a Crow began strongly, kicking three goals in her first three matches.

== Statistics ==
Statistics are correct to the end of 2025.

Legend
G	Goals	K	Kicks	D	Disposals	T	Tackles
B	Behinds	H	Handballs	M	Marks

Season	Team	No.	Games	Totals							Averages (per game)							Votes
Season	Team	No.	Games	G	B	K	H	D	M	T	G	B	K	H	D	M	T	Votes
2020	Carlton	1	7	2	1	50	50	100	14	32	0.3	0.1	7.1	7.1	14.2	2.0	4.6	2
2021	Carlton	1	9	0	0	75	75	150	15	36	0.0	0.0	8.3	8.3	16.7	1.7	5.0	7
2022 (S6)	Carlton	1	7	0	2	57	44	101	13	23	0.0	0.3	8.1	6.3	14.4	1.9	3.3	0
2022 (S7)	Richmond	2	12	4	1	83	114	197	16	57	0.3	0.1	6.9	9.5	16.4	1.3	4.8	4
2023	Richmond	1	10	0	2	107	111	218	23	60	0.0	0.2	10.7	11.1	21.8	2.3	6.0	5
2024	Richmond	1	12	0	3	100	126	226	24	43	0.0	0.3	8.3	10.5	18.8	2.0	3.6	5
2025	Richmond	1	9	0	1	101	77	178	22	33	0.0	0.1	11.2	8.6	19.8	2.4	3.7	0
Career			66	6	10	573	597	1170	127	284	0.1	0.2	8.7	9.0	17.7	1.9	4.3	23
