= Brittany Gibson =

Australian rules footballer

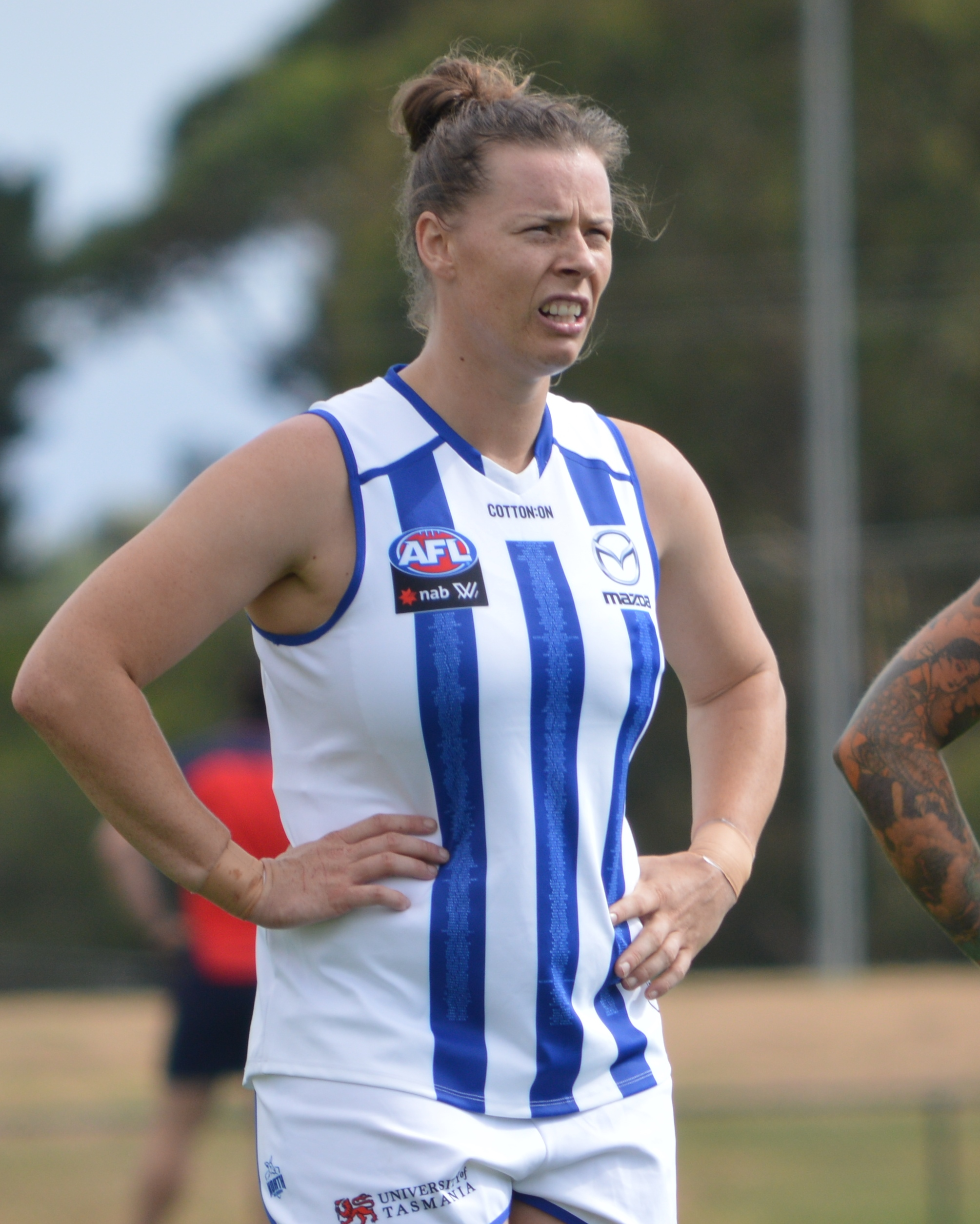
- Gibson with North Melbourne in January 2019

Personal information
- Nickname: Dozer
- Born: 18 April 1992 (age 34); Tasmania
- Original team: Burnie Dockers (TWL)
- Draft: No. 141, 2016 AFL Women's draft
- Debut: Round 1, 2017, Brisbane vs. Melbourne, at Casey Fields
- Height: 173 cm (5 ft 8 in)
- Position: Midfielder

Playing career^{1}
Years	Club	Games (Goals)
2017–2018	Brisbane	16 (5)
2019–2022 (S6)	North Melbourne	14 (3)
Total		30 (8)
- ^{1} Playing statistics correct to the end of 2022 (S6).

Brittany Gibson (born 18 April 1992) is an Australian rules footballer who played in the AFL Women's for Brisbane between 2017 and 2018 and for North Melbourne between 2019 and 2022 (S6).

== Early life ==
Gibson was born in 1992 in Tasmania. She was playing for Burnie Dockers when she was drafted.

== AFLW career ==
Gibson was recruited by Brisbane with the number 141 pick in the 2016 AFL Women's draft. She made her debut in the Lions' inaugural game against Melbourne at Casey Fields on 5 February 2017. In May 2018, Gibson signed with expansion club North Melbourne, to play with the club in the 2019 AFL Women's season. It was revealed she signed on with the club for one more season on 17 June 2021, tying her to the club until the end of 2022 AFL Women's season 6. In June 2022, Gibson was delisted by North Melbourne.

== Statistics ==
Legend
G	Goals	K	Kicks	D	Disposals	T	Tackles
B	Behinds	H	Handballs	M	Marks

Season	Team	No.	Games	Totals							Averages (per game)							Votes
Season	Team	No.	Games	G	B	K	H	D	M	T	G	B	K	H	D	M	T	Votes
2017	Brisbane	25	8	2	3	46	27	73	14	20	0.3	0.4	5.8	3.4	9.1	1.8	2.5	2
2018	Brisbane	25	8	3	2	59	31	90	17	20	0.4	0.3	7.4	3.9	11.3	2.1	2.5	0
2019	North Melbourne	18	7	1	0	50	20	70	20	19	0.1	0.0	7.1	2.9	10.0	2.9	2.7	0
2020	North Melbourne	18	7	2	3	43	15	58	15	15	0.3	0.4	6.1	2.1	8.3	2.1	2.1	0
2021	North Melbourne	18	0	—	—	—	—	—	—	—	—	—	—	—	—	—	—	—
2022 (S6)	North Melbourne	18	0	—	—	—	—	—	—	—	—	—	—	—	—	—	—	—
Career			30	8	8	198	93	291	66	74	0.3	0.3	6.6	3.1	9.7	2.2	2.5	2

== Personal life ==
Gibson lives with her wife Jaime and their son Henry.
