= Jesse Tawhiao-Wardlaw =

Australian rules footballer (born 2000)

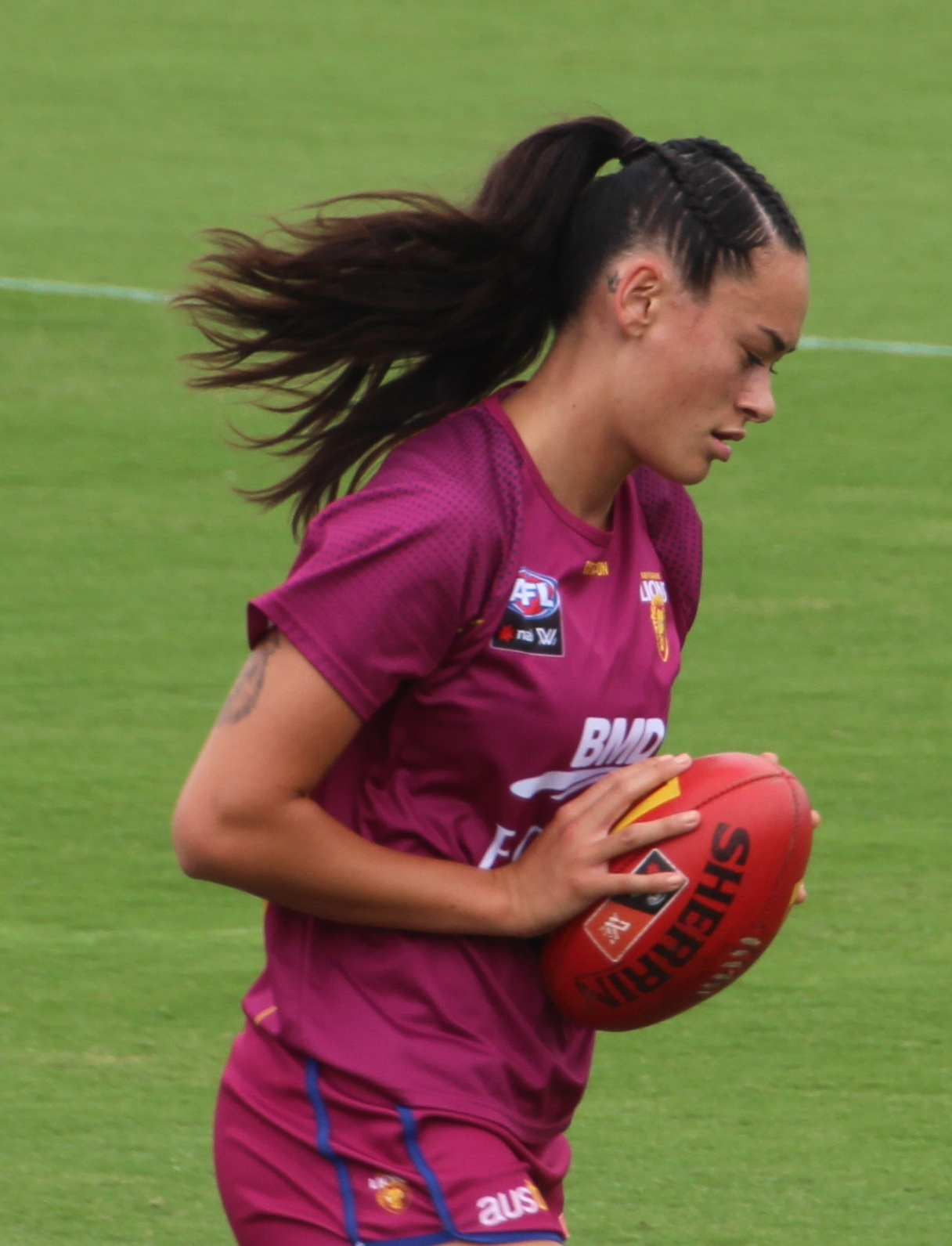
- Wardlaw warming up prior to the 2022 season 7 Grand Final

Personal information
- Full name: Jesse Tawhiao-Wardlaw
- Born: 13 January 2000 (age 26); Ashburton, New Zealand
- Original team: Coorparoo (QWAFL)
- Draft: No. 61, 2018 AFL Women's draft
- Debut: Round 1, 2019, Brisbane vs. GWS, at Moreton Bay Central Sports Complex
- Height: 185 cm (6 ft 1 in)
- Weight: 56 kg (123 lb)
- Position: Key forward / ruck

Club information
- Current club: St Kilda
- Number: 30

Playing career^{1}
Years	Club	Games (Goals)
2019–2022 (S7)	Brisbane Lions	49 (47)
2023–	St Kilda	34 (36)
Total		83 (83)
- ^{1} Playing statistics correct to the end of 2025.

Career highlights
- AFL Women's Rising Star nominee: 2020; Brisbane leading goalkicker: 2020, 2022 (S7); St Kilda leading goalkicker: 2024; AFLW premiership player: 2021; AFL Women's All-Australian team: 2022 (S7); AFL Women's leading goalkicker: 2022 (S7)

Jesse Tawhiao-Wardlaw (Note: Formerly known professionally as Jesse Wardlaw.) (born 13 January 2000) is an Australian rules footballer playing for the St Kilda Football Club in the AFL Women's (AFLW). She previously played for the Brisbane Lions from 2019 to season 7.

Tawhiao-Wardlaw was born in Ashburton, New Zealand to Māori parents, before emigrating to Australia at the age of four. She grew up participating in multiple sports, including cross country, basketball, netball and touch rugby. She attended John Paul College before later joining the Brisbane Lions' Academy program.

A key forward, Tawhiao-Wardlaw led Brisbane's goalkicking for the first time in 2020. Her breakout season as a power forward came in 2022 season 7, winning the AFL Women's leading goalkicker award with 22 goals—the highest average goal haul in the league, exceeding 2 goals a game.

== Early life ==
Jesse Tawhiao-Wardlaw was born on 13 January 2000, in Ashburton, New Zealand, to an Aucklander mother and Christchurch father. She is of dual Māori descent. She migrated to Australia with her family at the age of four.

Whilst growing up, Tawhiao-Wardlaw's father would join in kick-to-kick with a rugby league ball. At Slacks Creek State School and John Paul College, she participated in various sports, including cross country, basketball, netball and touch rugby. A talented netballer, Wardlaw was chosen in the Queensland Under 17 and Under 19 state representative sides. Her first introduction to Australian rules football was through her friends, who encouraged her to join the AFL 9s social non-contact team in the Yeronga competition; an umpire, Tayla Harris, saw significant potential in Tawhiao-Wardlaw and recommended that she play at club level. She began with Coorparoo junior women's before being part of the Brisbane South Under 17 representative team and the Queensland Under 18 side. During this time, Wardlaw was approached by the Brisbane Lions who signed her to their Academy program.

Tawhiao-Wardlaw was playing for Coorparoo in the AFL Queensland Women's League when she was drafted by Brisbane with the 61st pick of the 2018 AFLW national draft.

== AFLW career ==
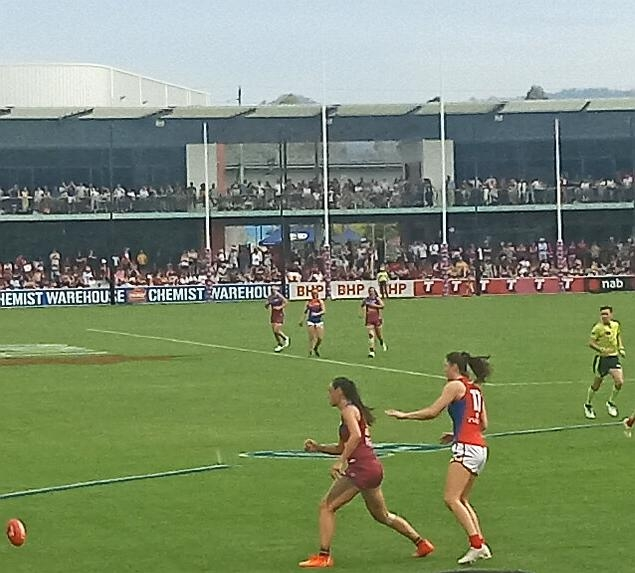
Jesse Tawhiao-Wardlaw leads Melbourne's Tahlia Gillard in the race to the ball during the Season 7 AFLW Grand Final.

On 3 February 2019, Tawhiao-Wardlaw made her debut in the Lions' round 1 game against Greater Western Sydney at Moreton Bay Central Sports Complex.

She received a nomination for the AFLW Rising Star Award in Round 2 of the 2020 AFLW season, after kicking three goals in the Lions' win over Geelong. Tawhiao-Wardlaw achieved selection in Champion Data's 2021 AFLW All-Star stats team, after coming runner-up in the league for average marks inside 50 in the 2021 AFL Women's season, totalling 2.0 a game.

On 8 March 2020, Tawhiao-Wardlaw was recognised by AFL Queensland for International Women's Day, as a cross-coder who plays multiple sports.

At the conclusion of 2022 season 7, Tawhiao-Wardlaw was traded to St Kilda as part of a five-club deal.
