= Roxy Roux =

Australian rules footballer

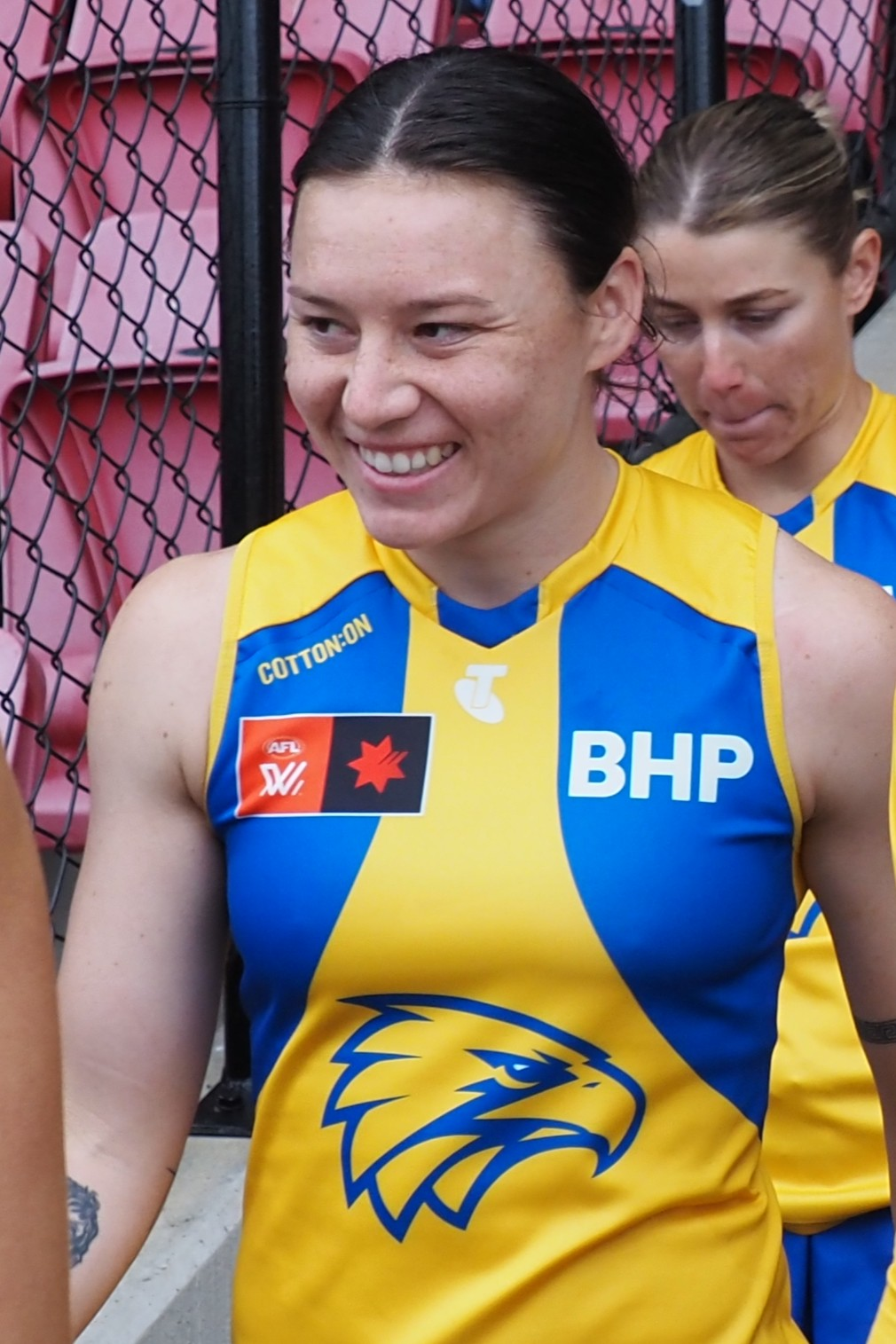
- Roux pre-match with West Coast in 2025

Personal information
- Full name: Roxanne Roux
- Born: 10 November 2001 (age 24)
- Original team: East Fremantle (WAWFL)
- Draft: No. 12, 2019 AFL Women's draft
- Debut: Round 1, 2020, Fremantle vs. Geelong, at Fremantle Oval
- Height: 170 cm (5 ft 7 in)
- Position: Forward

Club information
- Current club: West Coast
- Number: 9

Playing career^{1}
Years	Club	Games (Goals)
2020–2023	Fremantle	37 (16)
2024–2026	West Coast	22 (2)
Total		59 (18)
- ^{1} Playing statistics correct to the end of the 2026 season.

Career highlights
- AFL Women's Rising Star nominee: 2020; 22under22 team: 2020; East Fremantle WAWFL premiership player: 2018

Roxanne Roux (born 10 November 2001) is an Australian rules footballer playing for the West Coast Eagles in the AFL Women's (AFLW), having previously played for the Fremantle Football Club.

== Early life ==
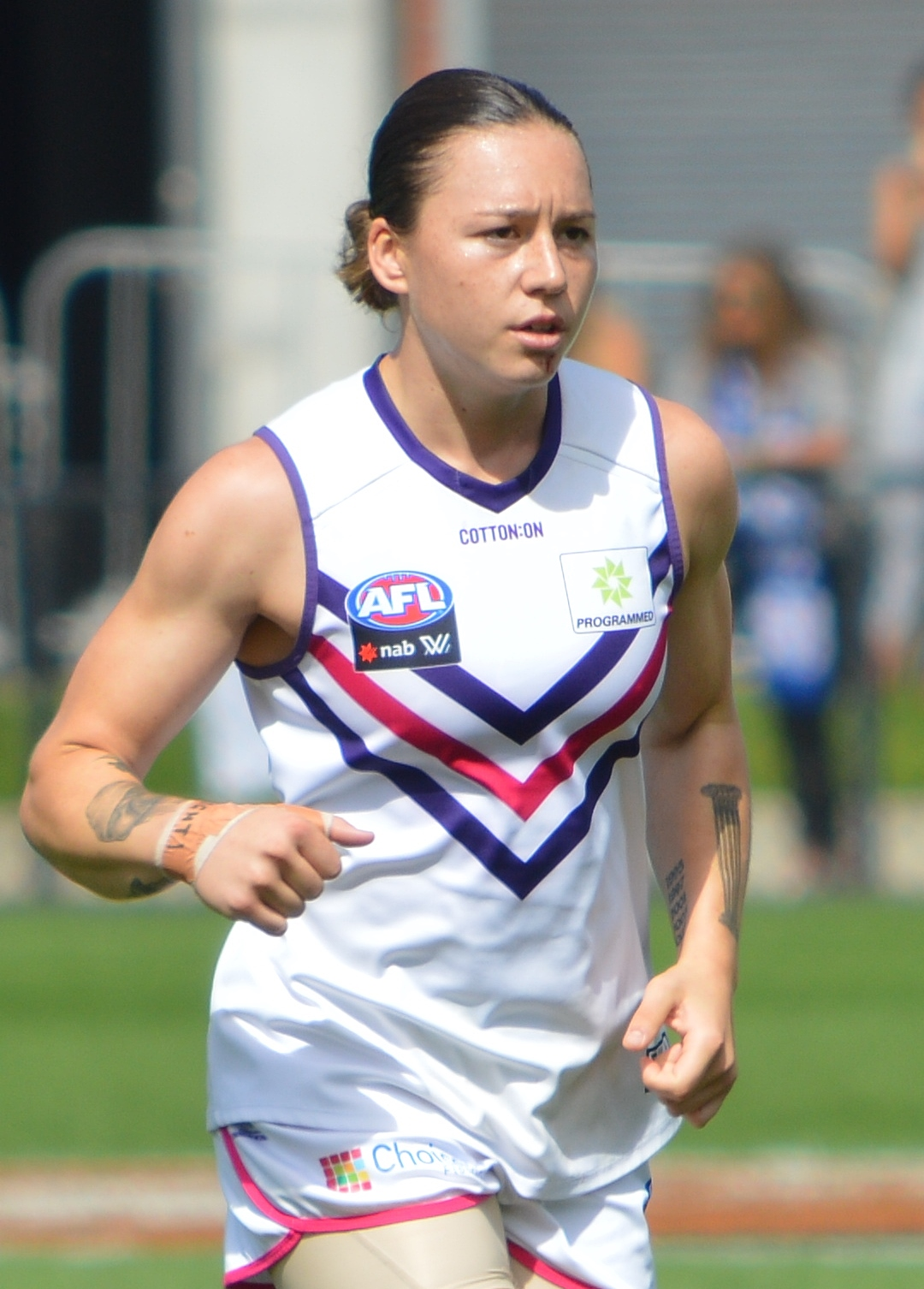
Roux playing for Fremantle in 2021

Roux lived in Dongara in the Mid West region of Western Australia until she was unable to play football in girls teams, so her family moved back to Perth and she played for East Fremantle in the West Australian Women's Football League (WAWFL).

== AFL Women's career ==
=== Fremantle (2020–2023) ===
Roux was drafted by Fremantle with their first selection, 12th overall, in the 2019 AFL Women's draft. Roux debuted against Geelong in Round 1 of 2020, kicking a goal and leaving her mark with a crunching tackle. She received both a Rising Star nomination and a Mark of the Year nomination the next week, kicking two goals in the first AFLW Western Derby.

=== West Coast (2024–2026) ===
Following the 2023 AFLW season, Roux requested a trade to cross-town rivals West Coast. She was traded on the 7th of December 2023, with the Dockers receiving Aisling McCarthy and picks also being swapped in the trade.

Roux was delisted from West Coast on 4th November 2026.
