= Tyanna Smith =

Australian rules footballer (born 2002)

Personal information
- Full name: Tyanna Smith
- Born: 29 October 2002 (age 24)
- Original team: Dandenong Stingrays (NAB League Girls)
- Draft: No. 6, 2020 national draft
- Debut: 29 January 2021, St Kilda vs. Western Bulldogs, at Moorabbin Oval
- Height: 167 cm (5 ft 6 in)
- Position: Midfielder

Club information
- Current club: St Kilda
- Number: 6

Playing career^{1}
Years	Club	Games (Goals)
2021–	St Kilda	43 (14)
- ^{1} Playing statistics correct to the end of the 2025 season.

Career highlights
- Rising Star nomination: 2021; St Kilda Best and Fairest Runner Up: 2021; St Kilda Best and Fairest Runner Up: 2023; St Kilda Best and Fairest Winner: 2025

Tyanna Smith (born 29 October 2002) is an Australian rules footballer playing for St Kilda in the AFL Women's (AFLW). She was drafted with the sixth selection in the 2020 AFL Women's draft by the St Kilda.

== Early football ==
Smith played junior football for the Beaconsfield Eagles Football Club in the under 9s division for 1 year and then started again in 2016 with the Girls U18 continuing there until end of 2019. She played for the Dandenong Stingrays in the NAB League in 2018, 2019 and 2020. In 2019, she played 7 games, kicking 7 goals and averaging 16.6 disposals. In 2020, the season was interrupted by the COVID-19 pandemic, meaning she only played the maximum 3 games that season. She was selected as an All-Australian in 2019 after the AFL Women's Under 18 Championships, where she was named on the half back flank while representing Vic Country. While playing for Vic Metro, she played 3 games and averaged 16 disposals.

== AFLW career ==
Smith debuted in the opening round of the 2021 AFL Women's season, in St Kilda's 9 point win over Western Bulldogs. On debut, she kicked her first goal, had 16 disposals, four marks and 3 tackles and was named as one of St Kilda's best. Smith received a 2021 AFL Women's Rising Star nomination in Round 4 after collecting 16 disposals, 3 marks and a game-high 13 tackles against Geelong. In St Kilda's Best and Fairest for 2021 season she finished runner up, polling a total of 49 votes which was 31 behind first placed Georgia Patrikios. She also won the Best Emerging Player Award. It was revealed Smith had signed on with the Saints for two more years on 30 June 2021, tying her to the club until the end of 2022 season 7. Cruelly, Smith suffered an Anterior cruciate ligament injury in November 2021, ruling her out of 2022 AFL Women's season 6.

== Statistics ==
Statistics are correct to the end of the 2021 season.

Legend
G	Goals	K	Kicks	D	Disposals	T	Tackles
B	Behinds	H	Handballs	M	Marks

Season	Team	No.	Games	Totals							Averages (per game)							Votes
Season	Team	No.	Games	G	B	K	H	D	M	T	G	B	K	H	D	M	T	Votes
2021	St Kilda	6	9	3	3	70	52	122	18	68	0.3	0.3	7.8	5.8	13.6	2.0	7.6	3
Career			9	3	3	70	52	122	18	68	0.3	0.3	7.8	5.8	13.6	2.0	7.6	3
