= Jaimee Lambert =

Australian rules footballer

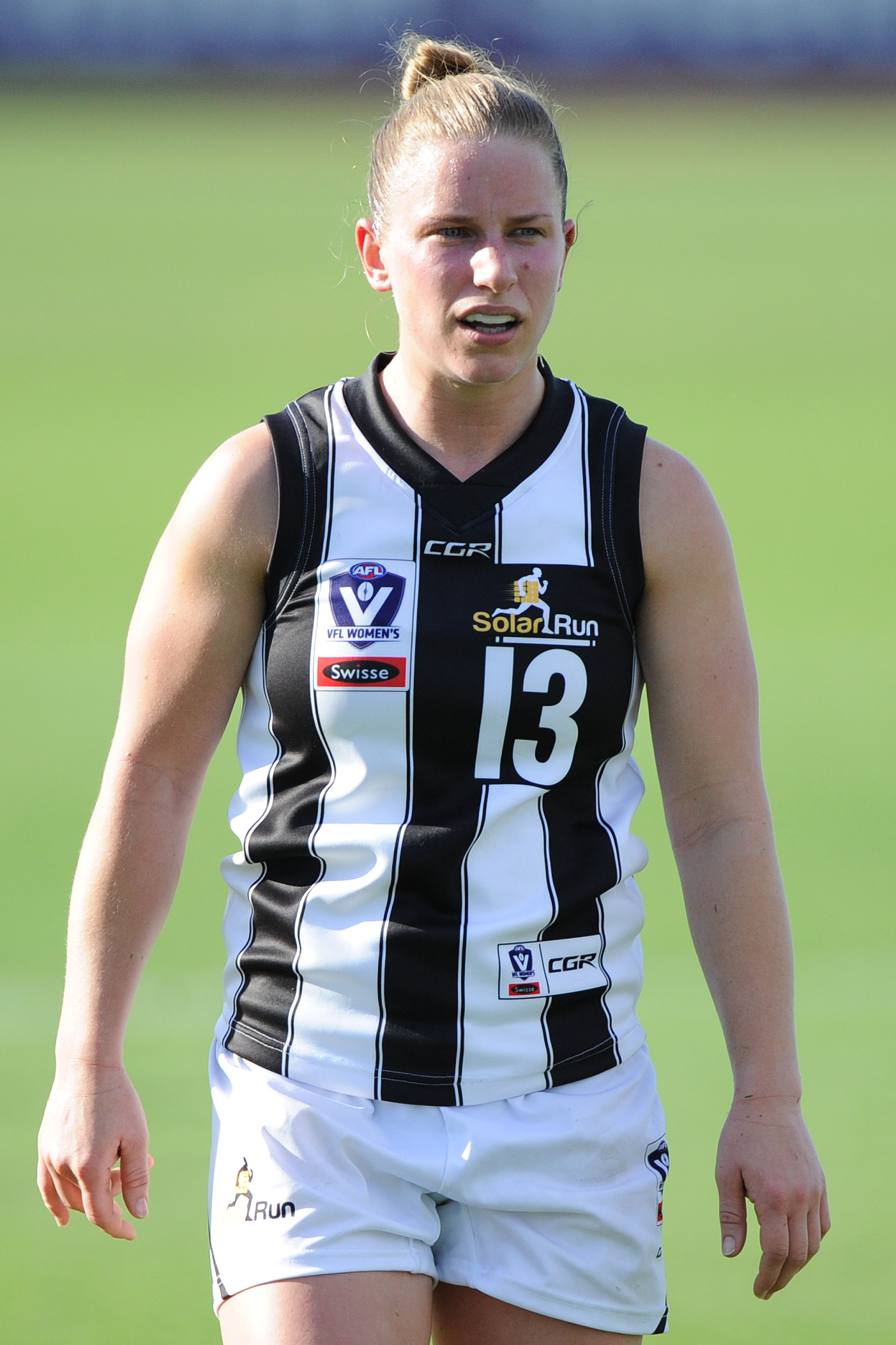
- Lambert playing for Collingwood's VFLW team in June 2018

Personal information
- Nickname: Chops
- Born: 6 November 1992 (age 33)
- Original team: Eastern Devils (VWFL)
- Draft: No. 5, 2016 AFL Women's draft
- Debut: Round 1, 2017, Western Bulldogs vs. Fremantle, at VU Whitten Oval
- Height: 162 cm (5 ft 4 in)
- Position: Midfielder

Club information
- Current club: St Kilda
- Number: 9

Playing career^{1}
Years	Club	Games (Goals)
2017	Western Bulldogs	6 (5)
2018–2022 (S7)	Collingwood	55 (17)
2023–	St Kilda	21 (8)
Total		82 (30)

Representative team honours^{2}
Years	Team	Games (Goals)
2017	Victoria	1 (1)
- ^{1} Playing statistics correct to the end of 2024.^{2} Representative statistics correct as of 2017.

Career highlights
- Susan Alberti award: 2016; Collingwood best and fairest (AFLW): 2019, 2020, 2022 (S6); St Kilda best and fairest (AFLW): 2023, 2024; Collingwood best and fairest (VFLW): 2018, 2019; AFL Women's All-Australian team: 2020, 2022 (S6)

Jaimee Lambert (born 6 November 1992) is an Australian rules footballer playing for St Kilda in the AFL Women's (AFLW). She has previously played for Western Bulldogs and Collingwood

== State league and representative football ==
Lambert has played Victorian Women's Football League (VWFL) football with the Eastern Devils from 2014 to 2016. She had previously played with Keysborough in the VWFL's south east division.

Lambert won the Susan Alberti award as the Western Bulldogs best and fairest player in the 2016 AFL exhibition series.

== AFL Women's career ==
=== Western Bulldogs ===
Lambert was drafted by the Western Bulldogs with the club's first selection and the fifth overall in the 2016 AFL Women's draft. She made her league debut in round 1, 2017, against Fremantle at VU Whitten Oval. She kicked her first AFLW goal in the match. Lambert missed the Bulldogs' round 2 match, being sidelined due to injury. She returned to the team the following week playing against Melbourne at VU Whitten Oval.

=== Collingwood ===
Lambert was traded to Collingwood in May 2017. She was packaged with the Bulldogs' first round draft selection (3rd overall) in exchange for the 1st, 4th and 12th picks in the 2017 AFL Women's draft.

Collingwood re-signed Lambert for the 2019 season during the trade period in June 2018.

Lambert is considered to have made a major impact at Collingwood due to her contributions in the disposals, tackles & goals kicked. She was awarded the club best and fairest awards in the 2019 season and the 2020 season, as well as being selected for the 2020 AFL Women's All-Australian team. She has also won the Best and Fairest awards at VFLW level in 2018 and 2019.

== Statistics ==
Statistics are correct to the end of 2024

Legend
G	Goals	K	Kicks	D	Disposals	T	Tackles
B	Behinds	H	Handballs	M	Marks

Jaimee Lambert AFLW statistics
Season	Team	No.	Games	Totals							Averages (per game)							Votes
Season	Team	No.	Games	G	B	K	H	D	M	T	G	B	K	H	D	M	T	Votes
2017	Western Bulldogs	2	6	5	2	34	15	49	6	15	0.8	0.3	5.7	2.5	8.2	1.0	2.5	0
2018	Collingwood	13	7	1	1	75	29	104	19	30	0.1	0.1	10.7	4.1	14.9	2.7	4.3	3
2019	Collingwood	13	7	3	5	75	34	109	22	37	0.4	0.7	10.7	4.9	15.6	3.1	5.3	1
2020	Collingwood	13	7	3	3	101	55	156	13	45	0.4	0.4	14.4	7.9	22.3	1.9	6.4	7
2021	Collingwood	13	11	4	3	124	91	215	25	48	0.4	0.3	11.3	8.3	19.5	2.3	4.4	4
2022 (S6)	Collingwood	13	11	4	3	131	92	223	32	66	0.4	0.3	11.9	8.4	20.3	2.9	6.0	12
2022 (S7)	Collingwood	13	12	2	5	125	71	196	23	53	0.2	0.4	10.4	5.9	16.3	1.9	4.4	7
2023	St Kilda	9	10	6	7	115	70	185	26	60	0.6	0.7	11.5	7.0	18.5	2.6	6.0	3
2024	St Kilda	9	11	2	5	127	82	209	25	80	0.2	0.5	11.6	7.5	19.0	2.3	7.3	11
Career			82	30	34	907	539	1446	181	434	0.4	0.4	11.1	6.6	17.6	2.3	5.3	48
