= Burnie Dockers Football Club Women's Team =

Tasmanian women's football team

The Burnie Dockers Football Club's Women's Team commenced playing in the newly branded Tasmanian Women's League (TWL) in 2013, transferring from the Yeomen Football Club. The Dockers competed in 3 consecutive grand finals taking out the TWL premierships in 2014 and 2016.

From 2017 the Women's Team will compete in the new Tasmania State League Women's.

== 2013 season ==
The 2013 Season saw a massive step up in the professionalism of the women's team stepping into a State League Club environment.

Inaugural Head Coach: Darren 'Spanner' Eade

Team Manager: Sophie Edwards

Runner: Kim Eade

Club Awards
| Best and Fairest - Wescombe Medal | Debra Allen (Bonde) |
| Runner up Best and Fairest | Kirby Goodson |
| Best Utility | Jaime Bradley |
| Coaches Award | Mike Shackleton |
| Most Improved | Georgia Eade |
| Best First year player | Tayla Marshall |
| Fremantle FC Community Award | Debra Allen (Bond) |

State Awards/Representatives
| Tasmanian Women's Team (National Carnival 2013) | Debra Allen (Bonde) |
| Tasmanian Women's Team (National Carnival 2013) | Jessica Whelan |
| Tasmanian Women's Team (National Carnival 2013) | Kirby Goodson |

== 2014 season ==
2014 saw Spanner return to the helm and lead the Women to their first Premiership. In a year that saw the team only lose 1 match, they were able to beat out Clarence for the Premiership

Head Coach: Darren 'Spanner' Eade

Assistant Coach: Michael Marshall

Team Manager: Kim Eade

Runner: Kim Eade

| Ladder Position | First |
| Finals Series | Premiership |

Club Awards
| Best and Fairest - Wescombe Medal | Brittany Gibson |
| Runner up Best and Fairest | Kirby Goodson |
| Most Courageous Player | Lucy Lenton |
| Coaches Award | Monique French |
| Best First year player | Emma Humphries |
| Best Youth Player | Ellyse Gamble |
| Encouragement Award | Jessica Brown |

State Awards/Representatives
| League Best and Fairest | Brittany Gibson (joint) |
| Grand Final Best of Ground | Brittany Gibson |
| U18 National Carnival | Ellyse Gamble (Vice Captain) |
| U18 National Carnival | Georgia Eade |
| U18 National Carnival | Tayla Marshall |
| U18 National Carnival | Danielle Radford |
| Senior State Team (v QLD) at Blundstone Area, Hobart | Kirby Goodson |
| Senior State Team (v QLD) at Blundstone Area, Hobart | Debra Bonde |

== 2015 season ==
2015 saw the team head back into the Grand Final, unfortunately this year they were unable to defend their 2014 Premiership

Head Coach: Darren 'Spanner' Eade

Assistant Coach: Debra Bonde

Team Manager: Kim Eade/ Jacqui French

Runner: Kim Eade

| Ladder Position | Second |
| Outcome | Runner Up |

Club Awards
| Best and Fairest - Wescombe Medal | Debra Bonde |
| Runner up Best and Fairest | Jaime Bradley |
| Most Courageous Player | Georgia Eade |
| Coaches Award | Ellyse Gamble |
| Best First year player | Savahn Overall |
| Best Youth Player | Jasmine Williams |
| Encouragement Award | Emma Humphries |
| Leading Goal kicker | Jessica Brown |

State Awards/Representatives
| Leading Goal Kicker | Jessica Brown |
| U18 National Carnival | Ellyse Gamble |
| Senior State Team (v QLD) at Burpengary, QLD | Debra Bonde (Co-Captain) |
| Senior State Team (v QLD) at Burpengary, QLD | Emma Humphries |
| Senior State Team (v QLD) at Burpengary, QLD | Meagan Kiely |
| Senior State Team (v QLD) at Burpengary, QLD | Savahn Overall |
| Senior State Team (v QLD) at Burpengary, QLD | Ellyse Gamble |

== 2016 season ==
The 2016 saw new head coach Jaime Bradley take the reins. Bradley lead the team to their second Premiership and she won the NW AFLTAS Coach of the Year Award.

Head Coach: Jaime Bradley

Director of Female Football Development: Guy ‘Chalky’ Grey

Team Manager: Jen Sweeny

Runner: Various

| Ladder Position | Second |
| Outcome | Premiership |

Club Awards
| Best and Fairest - Wescombe Medal | Brittany Gibson |
| Runner up Best and Fairest | Jaime Bradley |

State Awards/Representatives
| League Best and Fairest | Brittany Gibson |
| Grand Final Best on Ground | Ellyse Gamble |
| Leading Goal Kicker | Brittany Gibson |
| U18 National Carnival | Ellyse Gamble |
| Senior State Team (v NT) at St Kilda, VIC | Debra Bonde |
| Senior State Team (v NT) at St Kilda, VIC | Romany Ewington |
| Senior State Team (v NT) at St Kilda, VIC | Ellyse Gamble |
| Senior State Team (v NT) at St Kilda, VIC | Emma Humphries |
| Senior State Team (v NT) at St Kilda, VIC | Meagan Kiely |
| Senior State Team (v NT) at St Kilda, VIC | Savahn Overall |
| Senior State Team (v NT) at St Kilda, VIC | Jessica Whelan |

== 2017 season ==
2017 sees the start of a new generation of Burnie Dockers. Burnie is now the only State League club on the NW coast and therefore access to talent from Latrobe through to the West Coast. Starting the 2017 only sees 9 premiership players returning to the club

Head Coach – Sophie Edwards

Assistant Coach – Emma Humphries

Team Manager – Fern Messenger

Runner – various

State Awards/Representatives
| U18 National Carnival | Lauren Stevenson |
| U18 National Carnival | Sarah Skinner |
| U18 National Carnival | Zoe Knight |
| U18 National Carnival | Libby Haines |
| U18 National Carnival | Chloe Haines |
| U18 National Carnival | Shaeli Rodman |
| U18 Allies Squad | Lauren Stevenson |
| U18 Allies Squad | Libby Haines |
| U18 Allies Squad | Chloe Haines |

== AFL Women's Drafted Players ==
=== 2016 Draft ===
- Pick 57 - Emma Humphries (Melbourne)
- Pick 69 - Ellyse Gamble (Western Bulldogs)
- Pick 141 - Brittany Gibson (Brisbane Lions)
