= Tom Hunter (coach) =

Australian rules football coach (born 1991)

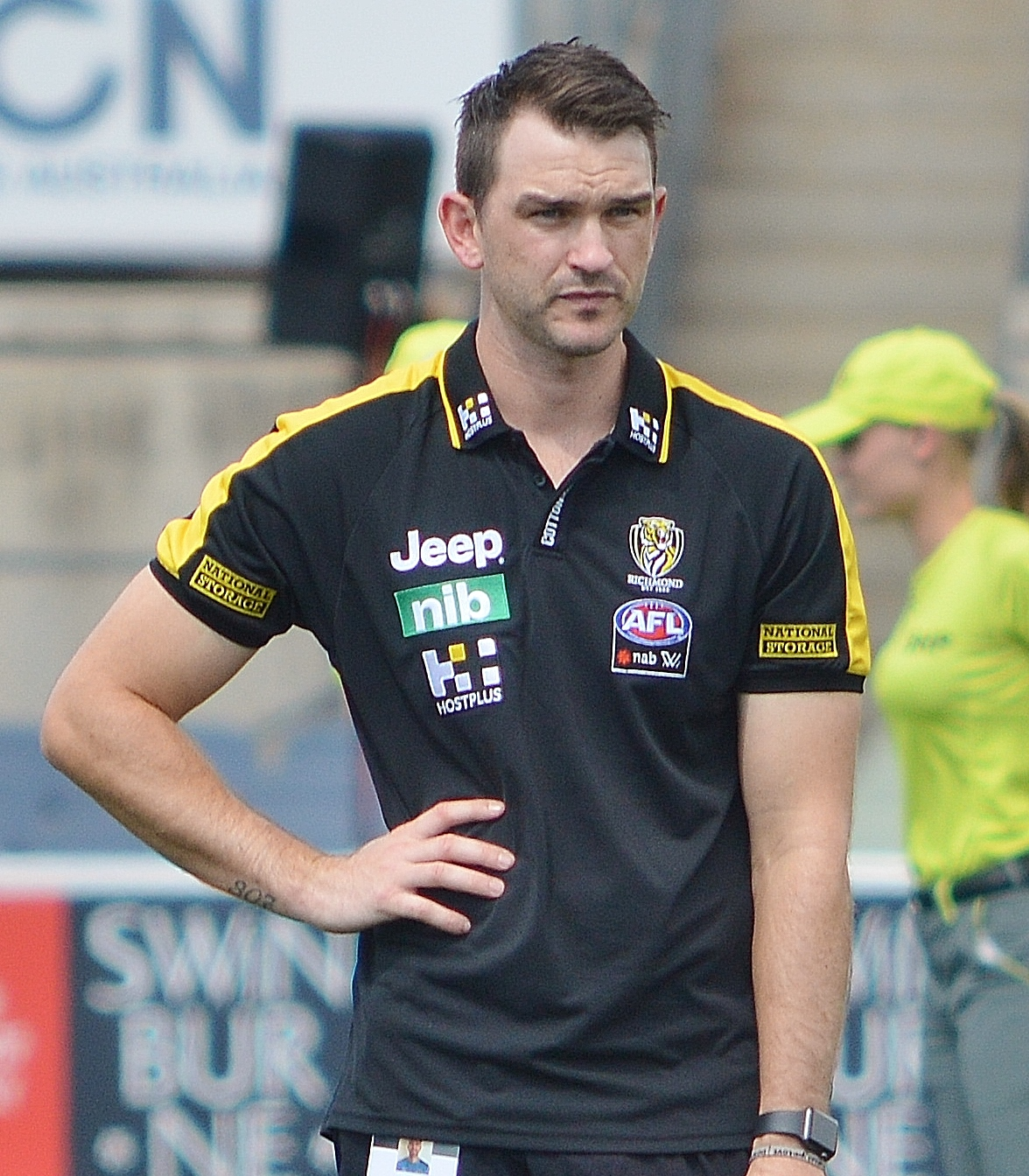
- Hunter coaching Richmond in February 2020

Personal information
- Born: 3 February 1991 (age 35)
- Original team: East Keilor
- Draft: No. 18, 2010 rookie draft
- Height: 185 cm (6 ft 1 in)
- Weight: 80 kg (176 lb)
- Position: Midfielder

Club information
- Current club: Richmond

Playing career
| Years | Club | Games (Goals) |
| 2010–2011 | Collingwood | 0 (0) |

Coaching career^{3}
| Years | Club | Games (W–L–D) |
| 2020 | Richmond (W) | 6 (0–6–0) |
- ^{3} Coaching statistics correct as of the 2020 season.

Thomas Hunter (born 3 February 1991) is an Australian rules football coach who coached Richmond in the AFL Women's competition (AFLW) in their debut season in 2020.

== Playing career ==
Hunter was rookie-listed by Collingwood from 2010 to 2011 before retiring aged 20 due to a spinal condition.

== Coaching career ==
In June 2019, Hunter was official appointed the inaugural coach of Richmond in the AFL Women's competition. In May 2020, Richmond decided not to renew Hunter's contract.
