= David Lake (coach) =

Australian rules football coach (born 1964)

Personal information
- Full name: David Lake
- Born: 18 May 1964 (age 62); Warrnambool, Victoria

Coaching career^{3}
Years	Club	Games (W–L–D)
2020–2021	Gold Coast (W)	16 (2–13–1)
- ^{3} Coaching statistics correct as of end of 2021 season.

David Lake (born 18 May 1964) is an Australian rules football coach who is a former coach of the Gold Coast Suns women's team in the AFL Women's (AFLW).

== Early life and playing career ==
Lake was born in Warrnambool, Victoria and grew up in Camperdown. When Camperdown won the 1968 Hampden league premiership David was one of the teams mascots and was pictured sitting in the front row. David would play his junior football in town and then when he was 16 made his senior debut for Camperdown Magpies in 1981.

He was talented enough to be recruited to Fitzroy's under 19 and Reserves team in 1982.

After leaving Fitzroy, Lake became a football nomad, playing for East Ringwood (1984/85/90), St Mary's in the Northern Territory and later playing at Morningside QAFL (1987-89), North Ringwood 1991, Perth and Western Suburbs SFL. His career in sales encouraged him to move around. Finally settling in Brisbane, Queensland with wife Natalie and his 5 children Rory, Josh, Sam, Jack & Eliza.

== Coaching career ==
Lake coached local Queensland State League teams Mount Gravatt 2006-2011 (Premiers 2007) and Morningside 2014-2015 (Premiers 2014). In 2015 Lake coached the Queensland State Representative team against a Victorian Metropolitan team

He successfully coached Papua New Guinea in the 2014 Australian Football International Cup to win the championship. David was again in charge of PNG for the 2017 Australian Football International Cup. The team won the title again.

=== AFLW ===
He was then appointed as an assistant coach of the newly established Brisbane Lions women's team in 2016 .

Lake was appointed the head coach of the Gold Coast Suns women's team on 5 March 2019. The club had moderate success in the 2020 seasons, winning two matches, drawing one game and losing in an elimination final. Following a winless (0-9) season in 2021, Lake resigned as the senior coach.
