= Rosie Dillon =

Australian rules footballer

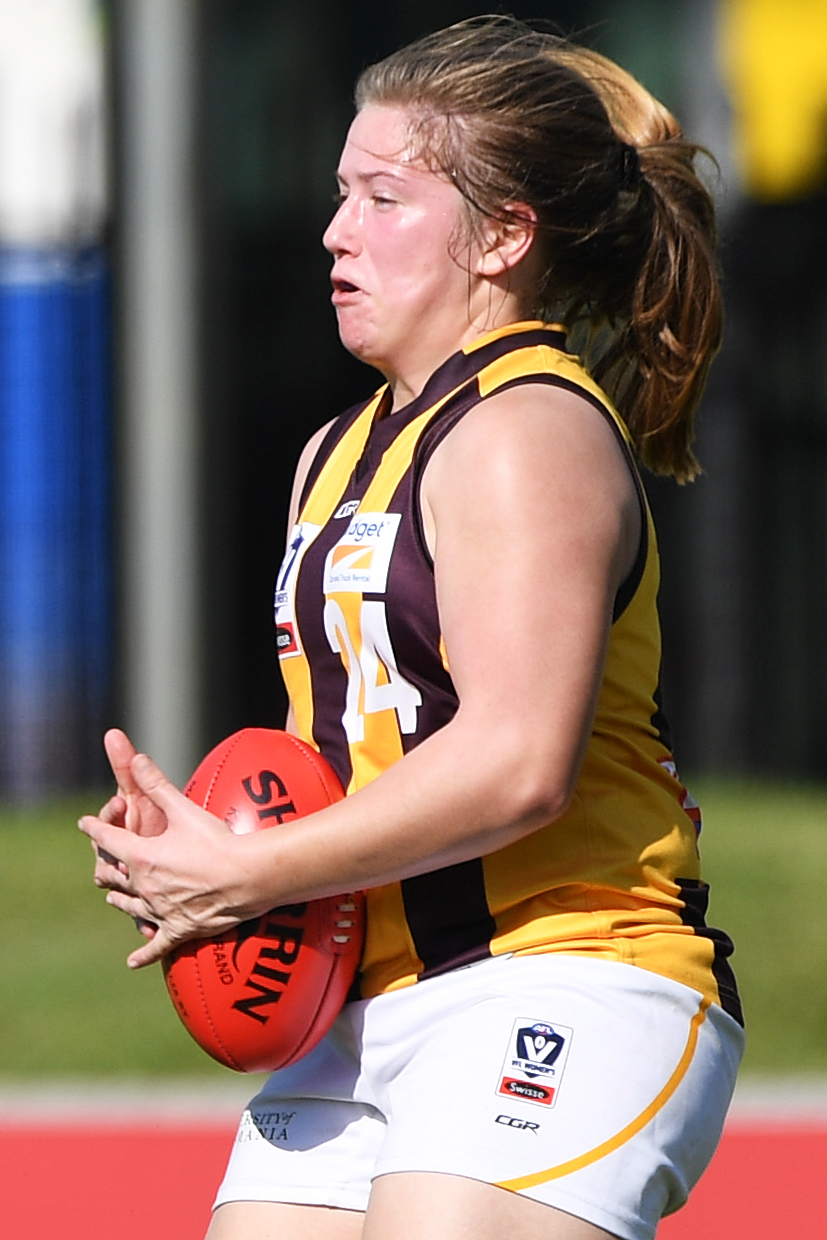
- Dillon playing for Hawthorn's VFLW team in August 2018

Personal information
- Born: 19 March 1996 (age 30)
- Original team: Hawthorn (VFLW)
- Draft: No. 24, 2019 national draft
- Debut: Round 1, 2020, St Kilda vs. Western Bulldogs, at RSEA Park
- Height: 163 cm (5 ft 4 in)
- Position: Midfielder

Club information
- Current club: St Kilda
- Number: 25

Playing career^{1}
Years	Club	Games (Goals)
2020–	St Kilda	28 (1)
- ^{1} Playing statistics correct to the end of the S7 (2022) season.

Career highlights
- St Kilda best and fairest: 2020

Rosie Dillon (born 19 March 1996) is an Australian rules footballer playing for the St Kilda Football Club in the AFL Women's (AFLW). Dillon was drafted by St Kilda with their second selection and twenty-fourth overall in the 2019 AFL Women's draft. She made her debut against the Western Bulldogs at RSEA Park in the opening round of the 2020 season.
