= Olivia Vesely =

Australian rules footballer

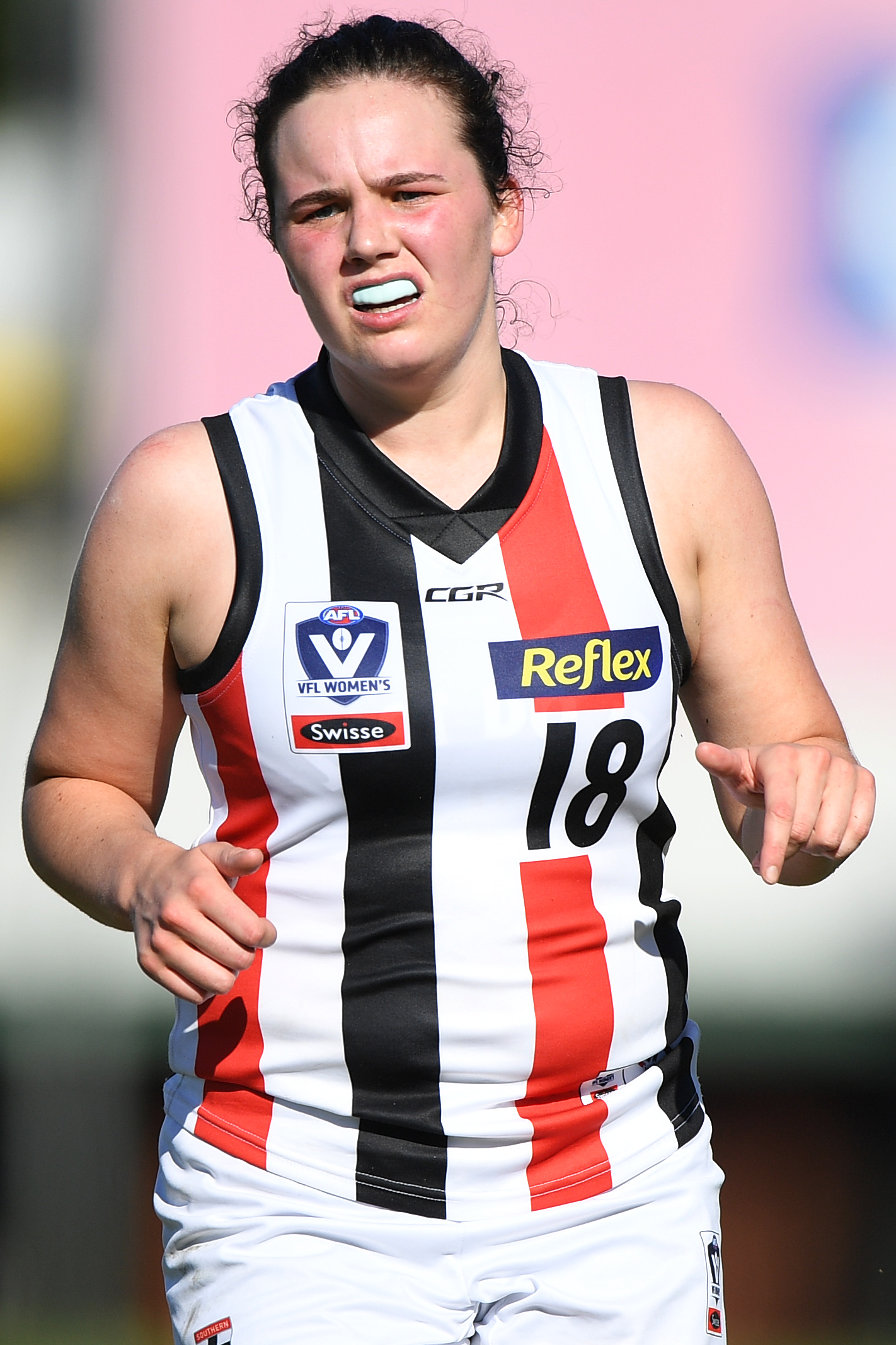

Personal information
- Born: 6 December 1999 (age 26)
- Original team: Southern Saints (VFLW)
- Debut: Round 1, 2020, St Kilda vs. Western Bulldogs, at RSEA Park
- Height: 166 cm (5 ft 5 in)
- Position: Midfielder

Club information
- Current club: St Kilda
- Number: 23

Playing career^{1}
Years	Club	Games (Goals)
2020–	St Kilda	30 (4)
- ^{1} Playing statistics correct to the end of the 2023 season.

Career highlights
- St Kilda best and fairest: 2020

Olivia Vesely (born 6 December 1999) is an Australian rules footballer playing for the St Kilda Football Club in the AFL Women's (AFLW). Vesely signed with St Kilda during the first period of the 2019 expansion club signing period in August. She made her debut against the Western Bulldogs at RSEA Park in the opening round of the 2020 season. It was revealed Vesely had signed on with the Saints for two more years on 30 June 2021, tying her to the club until the end of the 2022/2023 season.
