= Caitlin Greiser =

Australian rules footballer

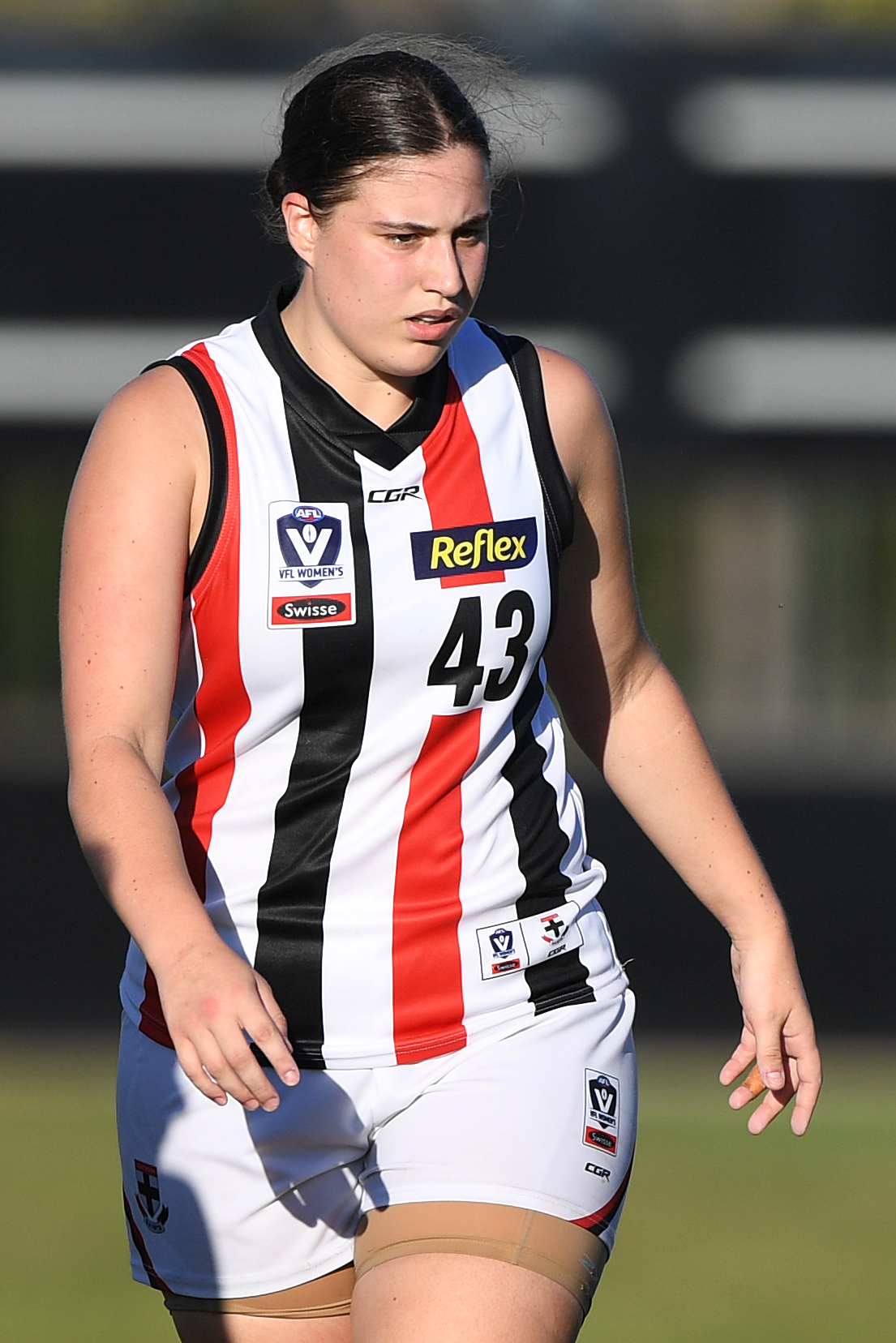
- Greiser playing for the Southern Saints in May 2019

Personal information
- Nickname: G-Train
- Born: 17 February 1999 (age 27)
- Original team: Southern Saints (VFLW)
- Draft: Pre-list signing, 2019 national draft
- Debut: Round 1, 2020, St Kilda vs. Western Bulldogs, at RSEA Park
- Height: 179 cm (5 ft 10 in)
- Position: Forward

Club information
- Current club: Richmond
- Number: 9

Playing career^{1}
| Years | Club | Games (Goals) |
| 2020–2022 (S7) | St Kilda | 34 (29) |
| 2023– | Richmond | 33 (31) |
| Total | | 67 (60) |
- ^{1} Playing statistics correct to the end of the 2025 season.

Career highlights
- AFL Women's leading goalkicker: 2020; St Kilda best and fairest: 2020; 2× St Kilda leading goalkicker: 2020, 2021

Caitlin Greiser (born 17 February 1999) is an Australian rules footballer playing for the Richmond Football Club in the AFL Women's (AFLW). Greiser signed with St Kilda during the first period of the 2019 expansion club signing period in August. She made her debut against the Western Bulldogs at RSEA Park in the opening round of the 2020 season.

Greiser earned the nickname "G-Train" (a nickname also used to describe former St Kilda footballer Fraser Gehrig) after kicking a long-range goal in the Saints' round three victory over Melbourne at Moorabbin Oval.

She was the AFLW's leading goalkicker in 2020 with 10 goals. The 2020 AFL Women's season saw Greiser obtain her first AFL Women's All-Australian team selection, named in the full forward position.

In March 2023, Greiser was traded to Richmond.

== Statistics ==
Statistics are correct to the end of the 2025 season.

Legend
| G | Goals | K | Kicks | D | Disposals | T | Tackles |
| B | Behinds | H | Handballs | M | Marks |

| Season | Team | No. | Games | Totals | | | | | | | Averages (per game) | | | | | | | Votes |
| Season | Team | No. | Games | G | B | K | H | D | M | T | G | B | K | H | D | M | T | Votes |
|---|---|---|---|---|---|---|---|---|---|---|---|---|---|---|---|---|---|---|
| 2020 | St Kilda | 17 | 6 | 10 | 5 | 56 | 2 | 58 | 16 | 8 | 1.7 | 0.8 | 9.3 | 0.3 | 9.6 | 2.7 | 1.3 | 3 |
| 2021 | St Kilda | 17 | 9 | 9 | 6 | 55 | 7 | 62 | 23 | 9 | 1.0 | 0.7 | 6.1 | 0.8 | 6.9 | 2.6 | 1.0 | 4 |
| 2022 (S6) | St Kilda | 17 | 9 | 4 | 1 | 43 | 16 | 59 | 13 | 13 | 0.4 | 0.1 | 4.8 | 1.8 | 6.4 | 1.4 | 1.4 | 0 |
| 2022 (S7) | St Kilda | 17 | 10 | 6 | 3 | 40 | 9 | 49 | 11 | 21 | 0.6 | 0.3 | 4.0 | 0.9 | 4.9 | 1.1 | 2.1 | 2 |
| 2023 | Richmond | 9 | 9 | 8 | 8 | 58 | 20 | 78 | 15 | 15 | 0.9 | 0.9 | 6.4 | 2.2 | 8.7 | 1.7 | 1.7 | 0 |
| 2024 | Richmond | 9 | 12 | 13 | 8 | 65 | 25 | 90 | 27 | 24 | 1.1 | 0.7 | 5.4 | 2.1 | 7.5 | 2.3 | 2.0 | 1 |
| 2025 | Richmond | 9 | 12 | 10 | 10 | 96 | 22 | 118 | 39 | 16 | 0.8 | 0.8 | 8.0 | 1.8 | 9.8 | 3.3 | 1.3 | 0 |
| Career | | | 67 | 60 | 41 | 413 | 101 | 514 | 144 | 106 | 0.9 | 0.6 | 6.2 | 1.5 | 7.7 | 2.1 | 1.6 | 10 |
