= 2020 AFL Women's season =

Fourth season of the AFL Women's (AFLW) competition

Overview
- Date: 7 February – 22 March 2020
- Teams: 14
- Premiers: Not awarded
- Best and fairest: Maddy Prespakis (Carlton); 15 votes
- Leading goalkicker: Caitlin Greiser (St Kilda); 10 goals

Attendance
- Matches played: 46
- Total attendance: 205,050 (4,458 per match)
- Highest: 35,185 (round 2, West Coast v Fremantle)

The 2020 AFL Women's season was the fourth season of the AFL Women's (AFLW) competition, the highest-level senior women's Australian rules football competition in Australia. The season featured 14 clubs and ran from 7 February to 22 March; it was intended to comprise an eight-round home-and-away season followed by a three-week finals series featuring the top three clubs from each conference, however the onset of the COVID-19 pandemic in March saw the season curtailed and finally abandoned without a premiership being awarded. Australian Football League (AFL) clubs Gold Coast, Richmond, St Kilda and West Coast featured for the first time in 2020.

Carlton's Maddy Prespakis won the AFL Women's best and fairest award as the league's best and fairest player, and St Kilda's Caitlin Greiser won the AFL Women's leading goalkicker award as the league's leading goalkicker.

== Background ==
=== New teams ===
Four new teams, Gold Coast, Richmond, St Kilda and West Coast, joined the competition, bringing the total number of teams to fourteen. This followed on from the inclusion of Geelong and North Melbourne in the previous season.

Expansion of AFL Women's
| Club | Entry in 2017 | | Entry in 2019/20 | | | Entry in 2022 (S7) | |
| Club | Placed bid | Granted entry | Placed bid | Granted entry | | Placed bid | Granted entry |
| Club | Placed bid | Granted entry | Placed bid | 2019 | 2020 | Placed bid | Granted entry |
|---|---|---|---|---|---|---|---|
| Adelaide | Yes | Yes | —N/a | | | | |
| Brisbane | Yes | Yes | —N/a | | | | |
| Carlton | Yes | Yes | —N/a | | | | |
| Collingwood | Yes | Yes | —N/a | | | | |
| Essendon | No | —N/a | Yes | No | No | Yes | Yes |
| Fremantle | Yes | Yes | —N/a | | | | |
| Geelong | Yes | No | Yes | Yes | —N/a | | |
| Gold Coast | No | —N/a | Yes | No | Yes | —N/a | |
| Greater Western Sydney | Yes | Yes | —N/a | | | | |
| Hawthorn | No | —N/a | Yes | No | No | Yes | Yes |
| Melbourne | Yes | Yes | —N/a | | | | |
| North Melbourne | Yes | No | Yes | Yes | —N/a | | |
| Port Adelaide | No | —N/a | No | —N/a | —N/a | Yes | Yes |
| Richmond | Yes | No | Yes | No | Yes | —N/a | |
| St Kilda | Yes | No | Yes | No | Yes | —N/a | |
| Sydney | No | —N/a | No | —N/a | —N/a | Yes | Yes |
| West Coast | Yes | No | Yes | No | Yes | —N/a | |
| Western Bulldogs | Yes | Yes | —N/a | | | | |

=== Collective bargaining agreement ===
Prior to the season commencing a collective bargaining agreement failed to pass the player's association, with only 70% agreeing, falling short of the required 75% threshold. One of the demands of the dissenters was to have a longer season, so that all the teams could play each other once. The players later voted with a vote of 98% to agree to a revised agreement, which steadily increased the number of matches to be played over three years.

=== Conference system ===
The conference system utilised in the previous season was retained for this season, though it was expanded to cater for the additional teams. Seven teams were placed in each of the two conferences, with teams playing all their intra-conference rivals once and two cross-over matches against teams from the other conference, resulting in an 8-round home and away season. The placing of the teams was determined by the AFL with competitiveness, list assessments and the previous season's results in mind.

Conference A
| Team | Stadium(s) | Capacity |
|---|---|---|
| Adelaide | Richmond Oval; Unley Oval | 16,500; 10,000 |
| North Melbourne | Arden Street Oval; UTAS Stadium; North Hobart Oval | 5,000; 21,000; 18,000 |
| Geelong | GMHBA Stadium | 36,000 |
| Greater Western Sydney | Blacktown ISP Oval; Robertson Oval; Giants Stadium | 10,000; 10,000; 24,000 |
| Brisbane | Hickey Park; Gabba | 5,000; 42,000 |
| Gold Coast | Metricon Stadium; Great Barrier Reef Arena; Fankhauser Reserve | 25,000; 10,000; 8,000 |
| Richmond | Swinburne Centre; Ikon Park; Queen Elizabeth Oval | 6,000; 21,000; 10,000 |

Conference B
| Team | Stadium(s) | Capacity |
|---|---|---|
| Fremantle | Fremantle Oval | 17,500 |
| Melbourne | Casey Fields; TIO Traeger Park | 12,000; 7,000 |
| Western Bulldogs | VU Whitten Oval | 12,000 |
| Carlton | Ikon Park; Marvel Stadium | 21,000; 56,000 |
| Collingwood | Victoria Park; Morwell Recreation Reserve; Marvel Stadium | 15,000; 12,000; 56,000 |
| St Kilda | RSEA Park | 10,000 |
| West Coast | Mineral Resources Park; Leederville Oval; Optus Stadium | 15,000; 15,000; 60,000 |

== Impact of 2019–20 coronavirus pandemic ==
The 2020 season was disrupted and then brought to an early end by the COVID-19 pandemic, which was formally declared a pandemic on 11 March 2020, prior to Round 6. The pandemic had the following effects on the season:

- All matches played from 14 March onwards were played to empty stadiums.
- The final two rounds of the home-and-away season were scratched and the finals brought forward by two weeks, being played based on ladder positions at the time.
- The finals series was expanded from six teams to eight. Under the original schedule, the top team in each conference was to advance directly to the preliminary finals while the second and third placed teams played off in semi-finals; but under the modified system, the fourth placed teams also qualified, and faced the first placed teams in semi-finals. Partway through the finals series, it was announced that no premiership will be awarded after the Victorian government announced a shutdown of all non-essential operations on 22 March 2020.

== Home-and-away season ==
The originally scheduled eight-round fixture and make-up of the conferences was released on 29 October 2019.

- All starting times are Australian Eastern Time.
- Richmond home games originally scheduled at the Swinburne Centre, the club's home ground, were later moved to Ikon Park out of concerns for crowd capacity.

=== Round 1 ===
| | Round 1 |
| Friday, 7 February (7:45 pm) | Richmond 2.2 (14) | def. by | Carlton 6.12 (48) | Ikon Park (crowd: 15,337) | Report |
| Saturday, 8 February (1:10 pm) | Greater Western Sydney 1.3 (9) | def. | Gold Coast 1.2 (8) | Blacktown ISP Oval (crowd: 1,540) | Report |
| Saturday, 8 February (3:10 pm) | Melbourne 3.4 (22) | def. | North Melbourne 3.2 (20) | Casey Fields (crowd: 3,500) | Report |
| Saturday, 8 February (5:10 pm) | Brisbane 5.4 (34) | def. | Adelaide 3.3 (21) | Hickey Park (crowd: 3,002) | Report |
| Sunday, 9 February (1:10 pm) | Collingwood 5.8 (38) | def. | West Coast 1.5 (11) | Victoria Park (crowd: 6,100) | Report |
| Sunday, 9 February (3:10 pm) | St Kilda 2.2 (14) | def. by | Western Bulldogs 6.3 (39) | RSEA Park (crowd: 8,000) | Report |
| Sunday, 9 February (5:10 pm) | Fremantle 6.8 (44) | def. | Geelong 4.4 (28) | Fremantle Oval (crowd: 5,509) | Report |
The match between Greater Western Sydney and Gold Coast, which was played in torrential rain, was the lowest scoring match in AFL history, in either the men's or women's competition, with the two teams scoring a combined score of only 2.5 (17). GWS's score of 1.3 (9) was the lowest winning score in history.

=== Round 2 ===
| | Round 2 |
| Friday, 14 February (7:40 pm) | Western Bulldogs 2.0 (12) | def. by | Melbourne 4.8 (32) | VU Whitten Oval (crowd: 3,133) | Report |
| Saturday, 15 February (3:10 pm) | North Melbourne 6.1 (37) | def. | Greater Western Sydney 2.7 (19) | UTAS Stadium (crowd: 2,102) | Report |
| Saturday, 15 February (5:10 pm) | Gold Coast 5.3 (33) | def. | Richmond 2.10 (22) | Metricon Stadium (crowd: 7,071) | Report |
| Saturday, 15 February (7:10 pm) | West Coast 2.3 (15) | def. by | Fremantle 9.6 (60) | Optus Stadium (crowd: 35,185) | Report |
| Sunday, 16 February (1:10 pm) | Geelong 3.2 (20) | def. by | Brisbane 6.3 (39) | GMHBA Stadium (crowd: 5,567) | Report |
| Sunday, 16 February (3:10 pm) | Carlton 3.6 (24) | def. by | Collingwood 6.3 (39) | Ikon Park (crowd: 7,529) | Report |
| Sunday, 16 February (5:10 pm) | Adelaide 6.4 (40) | def. | St Kilda 4.3 (27) | Richmond Oval (crowd: 6,433) | Report |

=== Round 3 ===
| | Round 3 |
| Friday, 21 February (7:10 pm) | St Kilda 3.1 (19) | def. | Melbourne 1.8 (14) | RSEA Park (crowd: 4,012) | Report |
| Saturday, 22 February (3:10 pm) | Western Bulldogs 4.6 (30) | def. by | Carlton 8.3 (51) | VU Whitten Oval (crowd: 8,259) | Report |
| Saturday, 22 February (5:10 pm) | Gold Coast 4.4 (28) | drew with | Brisbane 4.4 (28) | Metricon Stadium (crowd: 4,223) | Report |
| Saturday, 22 February (7:10 pm) | Fremantle 5.3 (33) | def. | Collingwood 4.6 (30) | Fremantle Oval (crowd: 5,636) | Report |
| Sunday, 23 February (1:10 pm) | Greater Western Sydney 6.6 (42) | def. | West Coast 2.2 (14) | Blacktown ISP Oval (crowd: 1,980) | Report |
| Sunday, 23 February (3:10 pm) | Richmond 2.8 (20) | def. by | North Melbourne 12.4 (76) | Ikon Park (crowd: 3,697) | Report |
| Sunday, 23 February (5:10 pm) | Geelong 6.2 (38) | def. by | Adelaide 8.1 (49) | GMHBA Stadium (crowd: 3,195) | Report |

=== Round 4 ===
| | Round 4 |
| Friday, 28 February (5:40 pm) | Collingwood 4.2 (26) | def. by | Melbourne 7.4 (46) | Marvel Stadium (crowd: 21,528) | Report |
| Saturday, 29 February (3:10 pm) | Richmond 7.3 (45) | def. by | Geelong 10.7 (67) | Queen Elizabeth Oval (crowd: 4,906) | Report |
| Saturday, 29 February (5:10 pm) | North Melbourne 6.11 (47) | def. | Gold Coast 5.4 (34) | Arden Street Oval (crowd: 3,280) | Report |
| Saturday, 29 February (7:10 pm) | West Coast 4.6 (30) | def. | Western Bulldogs 3.8 (26) | Leederville Oval (crowd: 2,455) | Report |
| Sunday, 1 March (1:10 pm) | Adelaide 4.4 (28) | def. by | Carlton 5.6 (36) | Richmond Oval (crowd: 7,281) | Report |
| Sunday, 1 March (3:10 pm) | St Kilda 3.5 (23) | def. by | Fremantle 3.6 (24) | RSEA Park (crowd: 3,870) | Report |
| Sunday, 1 March (5:10 pm) | Brisbane 7.9 (51) | def. | Greater Western Sydney 3.5 (23) | Hickey Park (crowd: 3,297) | Report |
The match between Collingwood and Melbourne was moved to Marvel Stadium from Victoria Park to act as a curtain-raiser for the AFL's bushfire relief State of Origin match.

=== Round 5 ===
| | Round 5 |
| Friday, 6 March (7:10 pm) | Gold Coast 2.6 (18) | def. by | Geelong 5.8 (38) | Great Barrier Reef Arena (crowd: 2,788) | Report |
| Saturday, 7 March (3:10 pm) | North Melbourne 9.9 (63) | def. | Adelaide 3.3 (21) | North Hobart Oval (crowd: 2,843) | Report |
| Saturday, 7 March (5:10 pm) | Greater Western Sydney 7.14 (56) | def. | Richmond 1.5 (11) | Robertson Oval (crowd: 3,377) | Report |
| Saturday, 7 March (7:10 pm) | Carlton 8.2 (50) | def. | St Kilda 4.5 (29) | Ikon Park (crowd: 3,871) | Report |
| Sunday, 8 March (1:10 pm) | Collingwood 8.5 (53) | def. | Western Bulldogs 3.3 (21) | Morwell Recreation Reserve (crowd: 1,992) | Report |
| Sunday, 8 March (3:10 pm) | Melbourne 10.6 (66) | def. | West Coast 1.1 (7) | Casey Fields (crowd: 1,800) | Report |
| Sunday, 8 March (5:10 pm) | Fremantle 7.8 (50) | def. | Brisbane 4.8 (32) | Fremantle Oval (crowd: 4,446) | Report |

=== Round 6 ===
| | Round 6 |
| Friday, 13 March (7:10 pm) | Geelong 3.2 (20) | def. by | North Melbourne 10.6 (66) | GMHBA Stadium (crowd: No attendance recorded) | Report |
| Saturday, 14 March (3:10 pm) | Brisbane 2.2 (14) | def. by | Collingwood 5.13 (43) | Hickey Park (crowd: 0) | Report |
| Saturday, 14 March (5:10 pm) | St Kilda 6.6 (42) | def. | Richmond 0.3 (3) | RSEA Park (crowd: 0) | Report |
| Saturday, 14 March (7:40 pm) | Melbourne 3.6 (24) | def. by | Carlton 6.4 (40) | TIO Traeger Park (crowd: 0) | Report |
| Sunday, 15 March (1:10 pm) | Western Bulldogs 8.3 (51) | def. by | Fremantle 10.6 (66) | VU Whitten Oval (crowd: 0) | Report |
| Sunday, 15 March (3:10 pm) | Adelaide 3.3 (21) | def. by | Greater Western Sydney 4.2 (26) | Richmond Oval (crowd: 0) | Report |
| Sunday, 15 March (5:10 pm) | West Coast 1.2 (8) | def. by | Gold Coast 5.3 (33) | Mineral Resources Park (crowd: 0) | Report |
Richmond's score of 0.3 (3) was, at the time, the lowest in AFL Women's history.; Round 6 matches were played without spectators, with the exception of the Friday night Geelong–North Melbourne match – which was open to be public, but did not have its attendance officially recorded.

== Ladders ==
Conference A
| Pos | Team | Pld | W | L | D | PF | PA | PP | Pts | Qualification |
|---|---|---|---|---|---|---|---|---|---|---|
| 1 | North Melbourne | 6 | 5 | 1 | 0 | 309 | 136 | 227.2 | 20 | Finals series |
| 2 | Greater Western Sydney | 6 | 4 | 2 | 0 | 175 | 142 | 123.2 | 16 | Finals series |
| 3 | Brisbane | 6 | 3 | 2 | 1 | 198 | 185 | 107.0 | 14 | Finals series |
| 4 | Gold Coast | 6 | 2 | 3 | 1 | 154 | 152 | 101.3 | 10 | Finals series |
| 5 | Geelong | 6 | 2 | 4 | 0 | 211 | 261 | 80.8 | 8 | |
| 6 | Adelaide | 6 | 2 | 4 | 0 | 180 | 224 | 80.4 | 8 | |
| 7 | Richmond | 6 | 0 | 6 | 0 | 115 | 322 | 35.7 | 0 | |

Updated to match(es) played on 7 March 2020. Source: womens.afl
Rules for classification: 1) points; 2) percentage; 3) number of points for.

Conference B
| Pos | Team | Pld | W | L | D | PF | PA | PP | Pts | Qualification |
|---|---|---|---|---|---|---|---|---|---|---|
| 1 | Fremantle | 6 | 6 | 0 | 0 | 277 | 179 | 154.7 | 24 | Finals series |
| 2 | Carlton | 6 | 5 | 1 | 0 | 249 | 164 | 151.8 | 20 | Finals series |
| 3 | Melbourne | 6 | 4 | 2 | 0 | 204 | 124 | 164.5 | 16 | Finals series |
| 4 | Collingwood | 6 | 4 | 2 | 0 | 229 | 149 | 153.7 | 16 | Finals series |
| 5 | St Kilda | 6 | 2 | 4 | 0 | 154 | 170 | 90.6 | 8 | |
| 6 | Western Bulldogs | 6 | 1 | 5 | 0 | 179 | 246 | 72.8 | 4 | |
| 7 | West Coast | 6 | 1 | 5 | 0 | 85 | 265 | 32.1 | 4 | |

Updated to match(es) played on 7 March 2020. Source: womens.afl
Rules for classification: 1) points; 2) percentage; 3) number of points for.

== Progression by round ==
- Numbers highlighted in green indicates the team finished the round inside the top 3.
- Numbers highlighted in blue indicates the team finished in first place in the conference for that round.
- Numbers highlighted in red indicates the team finished in last place in the conference for that round.

Conference A
| | Team | 1 | 2 | 3 | 4 | 5 | 6 | 7 | 8 |
|---|---|---|---|---|---|---|---|---|---|
| 1 | North Melbourne | 0_{3} | 4_{2} | 8_{2} | 12_{2} | 16_{1} | 20_{1} | x | x |
| 2 | Greater Western Sydney | 4_{2} | 4_{5} | 8_{3} | 8_{4} | 12_{3} | 16_{2} | x | x |
| 3 | Brisbane | 4_{1} | 8_{1} | 10_{1} | 14_{1} | 14_{2} | 14_{3} | x | x |
| 4 | Gold Coast | 0_{4} | 4_{3} | 6_{5} | 6_{5} | 6_{6} | 10_{4} | x | x |
| 5 | Geelong | 0_{5} | 0_{6} | 0_{6} | 4_{6} | 8_{4} | 8 | x | x |
| 6 | Adelaide | 0_{6} | 4_{4} | 8_{4} | 8_{3} | 8_{5} | 8 | x | x |
| 7 | Richmond | 0_{7} | 0_{7} | 0_{7} | 0_{7} | 0_{7} | 0_{7} | x | x |

Conference B
| | Team | 1 | 2 | 3 | 4 | 5 | 6 | 7 | 8 |
|---|---|---|---|---|---|---|---|---|---|
| 1 | Fremantle | 4_{4} | 8_{1} | 12_{1} | 16_{1} | 20_{1} | 24_{1} | x | x |
| 2 | Carlton | 4_{2} | 4_{4} | 8_{3} | 12_{3} | 16_{3} | 20_{2} | x | x |
| 3 | Melbourne | 4_{5} | 8_{3} | 8_{4} | 12_{2} | 16_{2} | 16_{3} | x | x |
| 4 | Collingwood | 4_{1} | 8_{2} | 8_{2} | 8_{4} | 12_{4} | 16_{4} | x | x |
| 5 | St Kilda | 0_{6} | 0_{6} | 4_{6} | 4_{6} | 4_{6} | 8 | x | x |
| 6 | Western Bulldogs | 4_{3} | 4_{5} | 4_{5} | 4_{5} | 4_{5} | 4 | x | x |
| 7 | West Coast | 0_{7} | 0_{7} | 0_{7} | 4_{7} | 4_{7} | 4_{7} | x | x |

== Finals series ==
Semi finals
March 21, Ikon Park
North Melbourne | 5.4 (34)
Collingwood | 5.2 (32)
March 22, Ikon Park
Carlton | 6.8 (44)
Brisbane | 2.3 (15)
March 21, Fremantle Oval
Fremantle | 12.8 (80)
Gold Coast | 1.4 (10)
March 21, Giants Stadium
Greater Western Sydney | 3.8 (26)
Melbourne | 4.5 (29)

Preliminary finals
28–29 March
North Melbourne | Cancelled
Carlton | Cancelled
28–29 March
Fremantle | Cancelled
Melbourne | Cancelled

Grand final
4–5 April
N/A | Cancelled
N/A | Cancelled

=== Semi finals ===
| | Semi finals |
| Saturday, March 21 (12:40 pm) | North Melbourne 5.4 (34) | def. | Collingwood 5.2 (32) | Ikon Park (crowd: 0) |
| Saturday, March 21 (2:40 pm) | Greater Western Sydney 3.8 (26) | def. by | Melbourne 4.5 (29) | Giants Stadium (crowd: 0) |
| Saturday, March 21 (1:40 pm) | Fremantle 12.8 (80) | def. | Gold Coast 1.4 (10) | Fremantle Oval (crowd: 0) |
| Sunday, March 22 (1:10 pm) | Carlton 6.8 (44) | def. | Brisbane 2.3 (15) | Ikon Park (crowd: 0) |

== Win–loss table ==
| + | Win | Qualified for finals |
| − | Loss | Eliminated |

| Team | 1 | 2 | 3 | 4 | 5 | 6 | 7 | 8 | SF | PF | GF | Ladder |
|---|---|---|---|---|---|---|---|---|---|---|---|---|
| Adelaide | BL; 13 | StK; 13 | Geel; 11 | Carl; 8 | NM; 42 | GWS; 5 | GCS | Rich | X | X | X | A6 |
| Brisbane Lions | Adel; 13 | Geel; 19 | GCS; 0 | GWS; 28 | Frem; 18 | Coll; 29 | Rich | NM | Carl; 29 | X | X | A3 |
| Carlton | Rich; 34 | Coll; 15 | WB; 21 | Adel; 8 | StK; 21 | Melb; 16 | WCE | Frem | BL; 29 | NM | X | B2 |
| Collingwood | WCE; 27 | Carl; 15 | Frem; 3 | Melb; 20 | WB; 32 | BL; 29 | StK | Geel | NM; 2 | X | X | B4 |
| Fremantle | Geel; 16 | WCE; 45 | Coll; 3 | StK; 1 | BL; 18 | WB; 15 | Melb | Carl | GCS; 70 | Melb | X | B1 |
| Geelong | Frem; 16 | BL; 19 | Adel; 11 | Rich; 22 | GCS; 20 | NM; 46 | GWS | Coll | X | X | X | A5 |
| Gold Coast | GWS; 1 | Rich; 11 | BL; 0 | NM; 13 | Geel; 20 | WCE; 25 | Adel | Melb | Frem; 70 | X | X | A4 |
| Greater Western Sydney | GCS; 1 | NM; 18 | WCE; 28 | BL; 28 | Rich; 45 | Adel; 5 | Geel | WB | Melb; 3 | X | X | A2 |
| Melbourne | NM; 2 | WB; 20 | StK; 5 | Coll; 20 | WCE; 59 | Carl; 16 | Frem | GCS | GWS; 3 | Frem | X | B3 |
| North Melbourne | Melb; 2 | GWS; 18 | Rich; 56 | GCS; 13 | Adel; 42 | Geel; 46 | WB | BL | Coll; 2 | Carl | X | A1 |
| Richmond | Carl; 34 | GCS; 11 | NM; 56 | Geel; 22 | GWS; 45 | StK; 39 | BL | Adel | X | X | X | A7 |
| St Kilda | WB; 25 | Adel; 13 | Melb; 5 | Frem; 1 | Carl; 21 | Rich; 39 | Coll | WCE | X | X | X | B5 |
| West Coast | Coll; 27 | Frem; 45 | GWS; 28 | WB; 4 | Melb; 59 | GCS; 25 | Carl | StK | X | X | X | B7 |
| Western Bulldogs | StK; 25 | Melb; 20 | Carl; 21 | WCE; 4 | Coll; 32 | Frem; 15 | NM | GWS | X | X | X | B6 |

== Awards ==
=== League awards ===
- The league best and fairest was awarded to Maddy Prespakis of Carlton, who polled 15 out of 18 votes.
- The leading goalkicker was awarded to Caitlin Greiser of St Kilda, who kicked ten goals during the home and away season.
- The Rising Star was awarded to Isabel Huntington of the Western Bulldogs.
- There was no Grand Final best on ground medal awarded, as the match was not played on account of the season's early termination due to the coronavirus pandemic.
- The goal of the year was awarded to Kate Hore of Melbourne.
- The mark of the year was awarded to Rebecca Privitelli of Greater Western Sydney.
- AFLW Players Association awards
  - The most valuable player was awarded to Jasmine Garner (North Melbourne).
  - The most courageous player was awarded to Kiara Bowers (Fremantle).
  - The best captain was awarded to Daisy Pearce (Melbourne).
  - The best first year player was awarded to Georgia Patrikios (St Kilda).
- The AFLW Coaches Association champion player of the year was awarded to Jasmine Garner (North Melbourne).
- Karen Paxman was named captain of the All-Australian team. Twelve of the fourteen clubs had at least one representative in the 21-woman team.
- Richmond were the lowest ranked team overall, and thus could be said to have "won" the wooden spoon, though this is a contestable claim given the use of conferences.

=== Best and fairests ===
| Club | Award name | Player | Ref. |
|---|---|---|---|
| Adelaide | Club Champion | Anne Hatchard | |
| Brisbane | Best and fairest | Emily Bates | |
| Carlton | Best and fairest | Maddy Prespakis | |
| Collingwood | Best and fairest | Jaimee Lambert | |
| Fremantle | Fairest and best | Kiara Bowers | |
| Geelong | Best and fairest | Olivia Purcell | |
| Gold Coast | Best and fairest | Jamie Stanton | |
| Greater Western Sydney | Gabrielle Trainor Medal | Alyce Parker | |
| Melbourne | Best and fairest | Shelley Scott | |
| North Melbourne | Best and fairest | Jasmine Garner | |
| Richmond | Best and fairest | Monique Conti | |
| St Kilda | Best and fairest | Rosie Dillon; Caitlin Greiser; Georgia Patrikios; Olivia Vesely | |
| Western Bulldogs | Susan Alberti Award | Isabel Huntington | |
| West Coast | Best and fairest | Dana Hooker | |

=== AFLW leading goalkicker ===
- Numbers highlighted in blue indicates the player led the season's goal kicking tally at the end of that round. The total is updated following the conclusion of the round.

| Rank | Player | Team | 1 | 2 | 3 | 4 | 5 | 6 | 7 | 8 | Total |
|---|---|---|---|---|---|---|---|---|---|---|---|
| 1 | Caitlin Greiser | St Kilda | 0_{0} | 2_{2} | 2_{4} | 1_{5} | 2_{7} | 3_{10} | x | x | 10 |
| 2 | Sabreena Duffy | Fremantle | 4_{4} | 1_{5} | 0_{5} | 0_{5} | 4_{9} | 0_{9} | x | x | 9 |
| 2 | Kalinda Howarth | Gold Coast | 0_{0} | 0_{0} | 3_{0} | 2_{1} | 0_{2} | 4_{2} | x | x | 9 |
| 4 | Kaitlyn Ashmore | North Melbourne | 1_{1} | 0_{1} | 3_{4} | 0_{4} | 4_{8} | 0_{8} | x | x | 8 |
| 4 | Jesse Wardlaw | Brisbane | 1_{1} | 3_{4} | 1_{5} | 2_{7} | 1_{8} | 0_{8} | x | x | 8 |
| 4 | Jasmine Garner | North Melbourne | 0_{0} | 2_{2} | 1_{3} | 0_{3} | 2_{5} | 3_{8} | x | x | 8 |
| 7 | Tayla Harris | Carlton | 1_{1} | 1_{2} | 1_{3} | 2_{5} | 1_{6} | 1_{7} | x | x | 7 |
| 7 | Cora Staunton | GWS | 0_{0} | 0_{0} | 1_{1} | 0_{1} | 4_{5} | 2_{7} | x | x | 7 |
| 9 | Rebecca Privitelli | GWS | 0_{0} | 0_{0} | 3_{3} | 1_{4} | 2_{6} | 0_{6} | x | x | 6 |
| 9 | Ashley Sharp | Fremantle | 0_{0} | 0_{0} | 1_{1} | 0_{1} | 2_{3} | 3_{6} | x | x | 6 |
| 9 | Daisy Bateman | North Melbourne | 1_{1} | 0_{1} | 2_{3} | 2_{5} | 0_{5} | 1_{6} | x | x | 6 |

== Coach changes ==
| Club | Outgoing coach | Manner of departure | Date of vacancy | Incoming coach | Date of appointment |
|---|---|---|---|---|---|
| West Coast | Inaugural coach | | | Luke Dwyer | 13 December 2018 |
| Gold Coast | Inaugural coach | | | David Lake | 5 March 2019 |
| St Kilda | Inaugural coach | | | Peta Searle | 17 April 2019 |
| Richmond | Inaugural coach | | | Tom Hunter | 19 June 2019 |
| Richmond | Tom Hunter | End of contract | 15 May 2020 | Ryan Ferguson | 6 November 2020 |
| North Melbourne | Scott Gowans | End of contract | 4 June 2020 | Darren Crocker | 4 June 2020 |
| West Coast | Luke Dwyer | Resigned | 25 September 2020 | Daniel Pratt | 12 January 2021 |

== Club leadership ==
| Club | Coach | Captain(s) | Vice-captain(s) | Leadership group | Ref |
|---|---|---|---|---|---|
| Adelaide | Matthew Clarke | Erin Phillips, Chelsea Randall | Courtney Cramey, Ange Foley | Sarah Allan, Jess Foley, Marijana Rajcic | |
| Brisbane | Craig Starcevich | Emma Zielke | Sharni Webb | Emily Bates, Breanna Koenen, Kate Lutkins | |
| Carlton | Daniel Harford | Kerryn Harrington, Katie Loynes | | Alison Downie, Sarah Hosking, Nicola Stevens | |
| Collingwood | Stephen Symonds | Steph Chiocci | Ash Brazill, Brianna Davey | | |
| Fremantle | Trent Cooper | Kara Antonio | | Ebony Antonio, Kiara Bowers, Hayley Miller, Gabby O'Sullivan | |
| Geelong | Paul Hood | Melissa Hickey | Meg McDonald | Renee Garing, Jordan Ivey, Aasta O'Connor | |
| Gold Coast | David Lake | Leah Kaslar, Sam Virgo | | Tiarna Ernst, Sally Riley, Jamie Stanton | |
| Greater Western Sydney | Alan McConnell | Alicia Eva | | Jessica Dal Pos, Pepa Randall, Cora Staunton, Britt Tully | |
| Melbourne | Mick Stinear | Daisy Pearce | Karen Paxman | | |
| North Melbourne | Scott Gowans | Emma Kearney | Jasmine Garner | Emma King, Brittany Gibson | |
| Richmond | Tom Hunter | Katie Brennan | Christina Bernardi | Phoebe Monahan, Lauren Tesoriero | |
| St Kilda | Peta Searle | Cat Phillips, Kate Shierlaw, Rhiannon Watt | | | |
| West Coast | Luke Dwyer | Emma Swanson | Dana Hooker | Maddy Collier, Courtney Guard, Alicia Janz | |
| Western Bulldogs | Nathan Burke | Ellie Blackburn | Brooke Lochland | Isabel Huntington, Kirsty Lamb, Hannah Scott, Lauren Spark | |

== See also ==
- 2019 AFL Women's draft
